= Judo at the 2016 Summer Olympics – Qualification =

Qualification for judo at the Games of the XXXI Olympiad

This article details the qualifying phase for judo at the 2016 Summer Olympics. The competition at these Games will comprise a total of 386 athletes coming from their respective NOCs; each has been allowed to enter a maximum of 14 (seven each for both men and women per division). Host nation Brazil has reserved a spot in each of all 14 events, while twenty are made available to NOCs through a Tripartite Commission Invitation.

The remaining judoka must undergo a qualifying process to earn a spot for the Games through the world ranking list prepared by International Judo Federation that begins on May 30, 2014, and then concludes two years later on the same date.

The top 22 men and top 14 women from the world rankings in each division must directly qualify, ensuring that the NOC is subjected to a limit of 1 judoka per division. If an NOC contains more than a single male athlete ranked in the top 22 and a single female in the top 14 of the world ranking list, the NOC can decide which of their athletes obtain the quota places. Further continental quotas (Europe 25, Africa 24, Pan America 21, Asia 20 and Oceania 10 across both sexes and all divisions) are also subjected to an overall limit to one judoka per NOC and two judoka per division from each continent.

== Summary ==
| NOC | Men | | | | | | | Women | | | | | | | Total |
| NOC | 60 kg | 66 kg | 73 kg | 81 kg | 90 kg | 100 kg | +100 kg | 48 kg | 52 kg | 57 kg | 63 kg | 70 kg | 78 kg | +78 kg | Total |
|---|---|---|---|---|---|---|---|---|---|---|---|---|---|---|---|
| Afghanistan | | | | | | X | | | | | | | | | 1 |
| Andorra | | | | | | | | | | | X | | | | 1 |
| Algeria | | X | | | X | X | X | | | | | | | X | 5 |
| American Samoa | | | X | | | | | | | | | | | | 1 |
| Angola | | | | | | | | | | | | X | | | 1 |
| Argentina | | | | X | | | | X | | | | | | | 2 |
| Armenia | X | | | | | | | | | | | | | | 1 |
| Aruba | | X | | | | | | | | | | | | | 1 |
| Australia | X | X | X | X | | | | X | | | X | | X | | 7 |
| Austria | X | | | | | | X | | | X | X | X | | | 5 |
| Azerbaijan | X | X | X | | X | X | X | | | | | | | | 6 |
| Belarus | | X | | | | | | | X | | | | | | 2 |
| Belgium | | X | X | X | | X | | X | | | | | | | 5 |
| Belize | | | | | X | | | | | | | | | | 1 |
| Benin | | | | | X | | | | | | | | | | 1 |
| Bolivia | | | | | X | | | | | | | | | | 1 |
| Bosnia and Herzegovina | | | | | | | | | | | | | | X | 1 |
| Botswana | X | | | | | | | | | | | | | | 1 |
| Brazil | X | X | X | X | X | X | X | X | X | X | X | X | X | X | 14 |
| Bulgaria | X | | | X | | | | | | | | | | | 2 |
| Burkina Faso | | | | | | | X | | | | | | | | 1 |
| Burundi | | | | | | | | | X | | | | | | 1 |
| Cameroon | | | | | | | | | | | | | X | | 1 |
| Canada | X | X | | X | | X | | | X | X | | X | | | 7 |
| Chile | | | | | X | | | | | | | | | | 1 |
| China | | X | X | | X | | | | X | | X | X | X | X | 8 |
| Colombia | | | | | | | | | | X | | X | | | 2 |
| Republic of the Congo | | | | | | | X | | | | | | | | 1 |
| Costa Rica | | | X | | | | | | | | | | | | 1 |
| Croatia | | | | | | | | | | | | X | | | 1 |
| Cuba | | | X | X | X | X | X | X | | | X | | X | X | 9 |
| Czech Republic | X | | X | | | X | | | | | | | | | 3 |
| Dominican Republic | | X | | | | | | | | | | | | | 1 |
| Democratic Republic of the Congo | | X | | | | | | | | | | | | | 1 |
| Djibouti | | X | | | | | | | | | | | | | 1 |
| Ecuador | X | | | | | | X | | | | X | | | | 3 |
| Egypt | X | | X | X | | X | X | | | | | | | | 5 |
| El Salvador | | | | X | | | | | | | | | | | 1 |
| Estonia | | | | | | X | | | | | | | | | 1 |
| Fiji | | | | X | | | | | | | | | | | 1 |
| Finland | X | | | | | | | | | | | | | | 1 |
| France | X | X | X | X | X | X | X | X | X | X | X | X | X | X | 14 |
| Gabon | | | | X | | | | | | | | | X | | 2 |
| The Gambia | | | X | | | | | | | | | | | | 1 |
| Georgia | X | X | X | X | X | X | X | | | | | X | | | 8 |
| Germany | X | X | X | X | X | X | X | | X | X | X | X | X | X | 13 |
| Ghana | | | | | | | | | | | X | | | | 1 |
| Great Britain | X | X | | | | X | | | | X | X | X | X | | 7 |
| Greece | | | | X | X | | | | | | | | | | 2 |
| Guatemala | X | | | | | | | | | | | | | | 1 |
| Guinea | | | | | | | | | | | X | | | | 1 |
| Guinea-Bissau | | | | | | | | X | | | | | | | 1 |
| Haiti | | | X | | | | | | | | | | | | 1 |
| Honduras | | | | | | | X | | | | | | | | 1 |
| Hungary | | | X | X | X | X | X | X | | X | | | X | | 8 |
| Iceland | | | | | | | X | | | | | | | | 1 |
| India | | | | | X | | | | | | | | | | 1 |
| Iran | | ~~X~~ | | X | | X | | | | | | | | | 2 |
| Iraq | | | | X | | | | | | | | | | | 1 |
| Israel | | X | X | | | | X | X | X | | X | X | | | 7 |
| Italy | X | X | | X | | | | X | X | | X | | | | 6 |
| Ivory Coast | | | | | | | | | | X | | | | | 1 |
| Japan | X | X | X | X | X | X | X | X | X | X | X | X | X | X | 14 |
| Jordan | | | | | X | | | | | | | | | | 1 |
| Kazakhstan | X | X | X | | | X | | X | | | X | | | | 6 |
| Kenya | | | | | X | | | | | | | | | | 1 |
| Kosovo | | | | | | | | | X | X | | | | | 2 |
| Kyrgyzstan | X | | | | | | X | | | | | | | | 2 |
| Laos | X | | | | | | | | | | | | | | 1 |
| Latvia | | | | | | X | X | | | | | | | | 2 |
| Lebanon | | | | X | | | | | | | | | | | 1 |
| Libya | X | | | | | | | | | | | | | | 1 |
| Lithuania | | | | | | | | | | | | | | X | 1 |
| Macedonia | | | | | | | | | | | X | | | | 1 |
| Madagascar | | | | | | | | X | | | | | | | 1 |
| Mali | | | | | | X | | | | | | | | | 1 |
| Mauritius | | | | | | | | | X | | | | | | 1 |
| Mexico | | | | | | | | X | | | | | | X | 2 |
| Moldova | | | | X | | | | | | | | | | | 1 |
| Monaco | X | | | | | | | | | | | | | | 1 |
| Mongolia | X | X | X | X | X | X | X | X | X | X | X | X | X | | 13 |
| Montenegro | | | | X | | | | | | | | | | | 1 |
| Morocco | | X | | | | | | | | | X | X | | | 3 |
| Mozambique | | | | X | | | | | | | | | | | 1 |
| Myanmar | | | | | | X | | | | | | | | | 1 |
| Nauru | | | | | X | | | | | | | | | | 1 |
| Nepal | | | | | | | | | | | X | | | | 1 |
| Netherlands | X | | X | X | X | X | X | | | X | X | X | X | X | 11 |
| New Zealand | | | | | | | | | | X | | | | | 1 |
| Niger | | | X | | | | | | | | | | | | 1 |
| North Korea | | | X | | | | | X | | | | | X | | 3 |
| Pakistan | | | | | | X | | | | | | | | | 1 |
| Palestine | X | | | | | | | | | | | | | | 1 |
| Papua New Guinea | | X | | | | | | | | | | | | | 1 |
| Peru | X | | | | | | | | | | | | | | 1 |
| Philippines | | | | X | | | | | | | | | | | 1 |
| Poland | | | | | | | X | | | X | | X | X | | 4 |
| Portugal | | X | X | | X | X | | | X | X | | | | | 6 |
| Puerto Rico | | | | | | | | | | | | X | | X | 2 |
| Qatar | | | X | | | | | | | | | | | | 1 |
| Refugee Olympic Team | | | | | X | | | | | | | X | | | 2 |
| Romania | | | | | | | X | X | X | X | | | | | 4 |
| Russia | X | X | X | X | X | X | X | X | X | | X | | | X | 11 |
| Samoa | | | | | | | X | | | | | | | | 1 |
| San Marino | | | | | | X | | | | | | | | | 1 |
| Saudi Arabia | | X | | | | | | | | | | | | | 1 |
| Senegal | | | | | | | | | | X | | | | | 1 |
| Serbia | | | | | X | | | | | | | | | | 1 |
| Seychelles | | | | | | X | | | | | | | | | 1 |
| Slovenia | | X | X | | X | | | | | | X | | X | | 5 |
| South Africa | | | | | X | | | | | | | | | | 1 |
| South Korea | X | X | X | X | X | X | X | X | | X | X | X | | X | 12 |
| Spain | X | X | | | | | | X | X | | | X | | | 5 |
| Sri Lanka | | | X | | | | | | | | | | | | 1 |
| Sudan | | | | | X | | | | | | | | | | 1 |
| Suriname | | X | | | | | | | | | | | | | 1 |
| Sweden | | | | X | X | X | | | | | X | | | | 4 |
| Switzerland | X | | | | X | | | | X | | | | | | 3 |
| Syria | | | X | | | | | | | | | | | | 1 |
| Chinese Taipei | X | | | | | | | | | X | | | | | 2 |
| Tajikistan | | | | | X | | X | | | | | | | | 2 |
| Tanzania | | | X | | | | | | | | | | | | 1 |
| Thailand | | | | | | | X | | | | | | | | 1 |
| Trinidad and Tobago | | | | | | X | | | | | | | | | 1 |
| Tunisia | | | | | | | X | | X | | | X | | X | 4 |
| Turkey | X | | | | | | | X | | | X | | | X | 4 |
| Turkmenistan | | | | | | | | | X | X | | | | | 2 |
| Ukraine | | X | | | X | X | X | X | | | | | X | X | 7 |
| United Arab Emirates | | | X | X | | X | | | | | | | | | 3 |
| United States | | | X | X | X | | | | X | X | | | X | | 6 |
| Uruguay | | | | | | X | | | | | | | | | 1 |
| Uzbekistan | X | X | X | X | X | | X | | | | | X | | | 7 |
| Vanuatu | | X | | | | | | | | | | | | | 1 |
| Venezuela | | | | | | | | | | | | X | | | 1 |
| Vietnam | | | | | | | | X | | | | | | | 1 |
| Yemen | | | X | | | | | | | | | | | | 1 |
| Zambia | | X | | | | | | | | | | | | | 1 |
| Total: 137 NOCs | 35 | 35 | 35 | 32 | 35 | 35 | 31 | 23 | 21 | 22 | 26 | 24 | 18 | 17 | 389 |

== Men's events ==
=== Extra-lightweight (60 kg) ===
| Section | Places | NOC | Qualified judoka |
|---|---|---|---|
| Host nation | 1 | Brazil | Felipe Kitadai |
| IJF World Ranking List (as of May 30, 2016) | 22 | South Korea | Kim Won-jin |
| IJF World Ranking List (as of May 30, 2016) | 22 | Azerbaijan | Orkhan Safarov |
| IJF World Ranking List (as of May 30, 2016) | 22 | Kazakhstan | Yeldos Smetov |
| IJF World Ranking List (as of May 30, 2016) | 22 | Japan | Naohisa Takato |
| IJF World Ranking List (as of May 30, 2016) | 22 | Georgia | Amiran Papinashvili |
| IJF World Ranking List (as of May 30, 2016) | 22 | Uzbekistan | Diyorbek Urozboev |
| IJF World Ranking List (as of May 30, 2016) | 22 | Russia | Beslan Mudranov |
| IJF World Ranking List (as of May 30, 2016) | 22 | Armenia | Hovhannes Davtyan |
| IJF World Ranking List (as of May 30, 2016) | 22 | France | Walide Khyar |
| IJF World Ranking List (as of May 30, 2016) | 22 | Great Britain | Ashley McKenzie |
| IJF World Ranking List (as of May 30, 2016) | 22 | Turkey | Bekir Özlü |
| IJF World Ranking List (as of May 30, 2016) | 22 | Netherlands | Jeroen Mooren |
| IJF World Ranking List (as of May 30, 2016) | 22 | Mongolia | Tsogtbaataryn Tsend-Ochir |
| IJF World Ranking List (as of May 30, 2016) | 22 | Australia | Joshua Katz |
| IJF World Ranking List (as of May 30, 2016) | 22 | Ecuador | Lenin Preciado |
| IJF World Ranking List (as of May 30, 2016) | 22 | Czech Republic | Pavel Petříkov |
| IJF World Ranking List (as of May 30, 2016) | 22 | Switzerland | Ludovic Chammartin |
| IJF World Ranking List (as of May 30, 2016) | 22 | Austria | Ludwig Paischer |
| IJF World Ranking List (as of May 30, 2016) | 22 | Spain | Francisco Garrigós |
| IJF World Ranking List (as of May 30, 2016) | 22 | Germany | Tobias Englmaier |
| IJF World Ranking List (as of May 30, 2016) | 22 | Italy | Elios Manzi |
| IJF World Ranking List (as of May 30, 2016) | 22 | Canada | Sérgio Pessoa |
| Additional places (Europe) | 2 | Bulgaria | Yanislav Gerchev |
| Additional places (Europe) | 2 | Finland | Juho Reinvall |
| Additional places (Africa) | 2 | Egypt | Ahmed Abelrahman |
| Additional places (Africa) | 2 | Libya | Mohamed El-Kawisah |
| Additional places (America) | 2 | Guatemala | José Ramos |
| Additional places (America) | 2 | Peru | Juan Postigos |
| Additional places (Asia) | 2 | Kyrgyzstan | Otar Bestaev |
| Additional places (Asia) | 2 | Chinese Taipei | Tsai Ming-yen |
| Additional places (Oceania) | 0 | — | — |
| Invitational | 4 | Botswana | Gavin Mogopa |
| Invitational | 4 | Laos | Soukphaxay Sithisane |
| Invitational | 4 | Monaco | Yann Siccardi |
| Invitational | 4 | Palestine | Simon Yacoub |
| Total | 35 | | |

=== Half-lightweight (66 kg) ===
| Section | Places | NOC | Qualified judoka |
|---|---|---|---|
| Host nation | 1 | Brazil | Charles Chibana |
| IJF World Ranking List (as of May 30, 2016) | 22 | South Korea | An Ba-ul |
| IJF World Ranking List (as of May 30, 2016) | 22 | Mongolia | Davaadorjiin Tömörkhüleg |
| IJF World Ranking List (as of May 30, 2016) | 22 | Russia | Mikhail Pulyaev |
| IJF World Ranking List (as of May 30, 2016) | 22 | Ukraine | Georgii Zantaraia |
| IJF World Ranking List (as of May 30, 2016) | 22 | Japan | Masashi Ebinuma |
| IJF World Ranking List (as of May 30, 2016) | 22 | Israel | Golan Pollack |
| IJF World Ranking List (as of May 30, 2016) | 22 | Azerbaijan | Nijat Shikhalizade |
| IJF World Ranking List (as of May 30, 2016) | 22 | Georgia | Vazha Margvelashvili |
| IJF World Ranking List (as of May 30, 2016) | 22 | Uzbekistan | Rishod Sobirov |
| IJF World Ranking List (as of May 30, 2016) | 22 | Belarus | Dzmitry Shershan |
| IJF World Ranking List (as of May 30, 2016) | 22 | Germany | Sebastian Seidl |
| IJF World Ranking List (as of May 30, 2016) | 22 | Great Britain | Colin Oates |
| IJF World Ranking List (as of May 30, 2016) | 22 | Spain | Sugoi Uriarte |
| IJF World Ranking List (as of May 30, 2016) | 22 | Kazakhstan | Zhansay Smagulov |
| IJF World Ranking List (as of May 30, 2016) | 22 | Canada | Antoine Bouchard |
| IJF World Ranking List (as of May 30, 2016) | 22 | Portugal | Sergiu Oleinic |
| IJF World Ranking List (as of May 30, 2016) | 22 | Australia | Nathan Katz |
| IJF World Ranking List (as of May 30, 2016) | 22 | France | Kilian Le Blouch |
| IJF World Ranking List (as of May 30, 2016) | 22 | China | Ma Duanbin |
| IJF World Ranking List (as of May 30, 2016) | 22 | Algeria | Houd Zourdani |
| IJF World Ranking List (as of May 30, 2016) | 22 | Italy | Fabio Basile |
| IJF World Ranking List (as of May 30, 2016) | 22 | Morocco | Imad Bassou |
| Additional places (Europe) | 2 | Slovenia | Adrian Gomboc |
| Additional places (Europe) | 2 | Belgium | Jasper Lefevere |
| Additional places (Africa) | 2 | ~~South Africa~~ | ~~Siyabulela Mabulu~~ |
| Additional places (Africa) | 2 | Zambia | Mathews Punza |
| Additional places (Africa) | 2 | Democratic Republic of the Congo | Rodrick Kuku |
| Additional places (America) | 2 | Dominican Republic | Wander Mateo |
| Additional places (America) | 2 | Aruba | Jayme Mata |
| Additional places (Asia) | ~~2~~; 1 | ~~Iran~~ | ~~Alireza Khojasteh~~ (Note: Alireza Khojasteh withdrew from the Olympics. With the withdrawal of an Iranian judoka, the International Judo Federation invited Kodo Nakano of the Philippines to participate at the 81 kg event.) |
| Additional places (Asia) | ~~2~~; 1 | Saudi Arabia | Sulaiman Hamad |
| Additional places (Oceania) | 2 | Papua New Guinea | Raymond Ovinou |
| Additional places (Oceania) | 2 | Vanuatu | Joe Mahit |
| Invitational | 2 | Djibouti | Anass Houssein |
| Invitational | 2 | Suriname | Yigal Kopinsky |
| Total | 34 | | |

=== Lightweight (73 kg) ===
| Section | Places | NOC | Qualified judoka |
|---|---|---|---|
| Host nation | 1 | Brazil | Alex Pombo |
| IJF World Ranking List (as of May 30, 2016) | 22 | South Korea | An Chang-rim |
| IJF World Ranking List (as of May 30, 2016) | 22 | Azerbaijan | Rustam Orujov |
| IJF World Ranking List (as of May 30, 2016) | 22 | Israel | Sagi Muki |
| IJF World Ranking List (as of May 30, 2016) | 22 | Georgia | Lasha Shavdatuashvili |
| IJF World Ranking List (as of May 30, 2016) | 22 | Japan | Shohei Ono |
| IJF World Ranking List (as of May 30, 2016) | 22 | Russia | Denis Iartcev |
| IJF World Ranking List (as of May 30, 2016) | 22 | Mongolia | Ganbaataryn Odbayar |
| IJF World Ranking List (as of May 30, 2016) | 22 | Uzbekistan | Mirali Sharipov |
| IJF World Ranking List (as of May 30, 2016) | 22 | Hungary | Miklós Ungvári |
| IJF World Ranking List (as of May 30, 2016) | 22 | Canada | Arthur Margelidon |
| IJF World Ranking List (as of May 30, 2016) | 22 | Germany | Igor Wandtke |
| IJF World Ranking List (as of May 30, 2016) | 22 | Belgium | Dirk van Tichelt |
| IJF World Ranking List (as of May 30, 2016) | 22 | Slovenia | Rok Drakšič |
| IJF World Ranking List (as of May 30, 2016) | 22 | North Korea | Hong Kuk-hyon |
| IJF World Ranking List (as of May 30, 2016) | 22 | Netherlands | Dex Elmont |
| IJF World Ranking List (as of May 30, 2016) | 22 | France | Pierre Duprat |
| IJF World Ranking List (as of May 30, 2016) | 22 | United Arab Emirates | Victor Scvortov |
| IJF World Ranking List (as of May 30, 2016) | 22 | Egypt | Mohamed Mohy Eldin |
| IJF World Ranking List (as of May 30, 2016) | 22 | China | Sai Yinjirigala |
| IJF World Ranking List (as of May 30, 2016) | 22 | Australia | Jake Bensted |
| IJF World Ranking List (as of May 30, 2016) | 22 | Cuba | Magdiel Estrada |
| IJF World Ranking List (as of May 30, 2016) | 22 | United States | Nicholas Delpopolo |
| Additional places (Europe) | 2 | Czech Republic | Jaromír Ježek |
| Additional places (Europe) | 2 | Portugal | Nuno Saraiva |
| Additional places (Africa) | 2 | The Gambia | Faye Njie |
| Additional places (Africa) | 2 | Niger | Ahmed Goumar |
| Additional places (America) | 2 | Costa Rica | Miguel Murillo |
| Additional places (America) | 2 | Haiti | Josue Deprez |
| Additional places (Asia) | 1 | Qatar | Morad Zemouri |
| Additional places (Oceania) | 1 | American Samoa | Benjamin Waterhouse |
| Invitational | 4 | Sri Lanka | Chamara Repiyallage |
| Invitational | 4 | Syria | Mohamad Kasem |
| Invitational | 4 | Tanzania | Andrew Thomas Mlugu |
| Invitational | 4 | Yemen | Zeyad Mater |
| Total | 35 | | |

=== Half-middleweight (81 kg) ===
| Section | Places | NOC | Qualified judoka |
|---|---|---|---|
| Host nation | 1 | Brazil | Victor Penalber |
| IJF World Ranking List (as of May 30, 2016) | 22 | Georgia | Avtandili Tchrikishvili |
| IJF World Ranking List (as of May 30, 2016) | 22 | Japan | Takanori Nagase |
| IJF World Ranking List (as of May 30, 2016) | 22 | Canada | Antoine Valois-Fortier |
| IJF World Ranking List (as of May 30, 2016) | 22 | Bulgaria | Ivaylo Ivanov |
| IJF World Ranking List (as of May 30, 2016) | 22 | United States | Travis Stevens |
| IJF World Ranking List (as of May 30, 2016) | 22 | Russia | Khasan Khalmurzaev |
| IJF World Ranking List (as of May 30, 2016) | 22 | Belgium | Joachim Bottieau |
| IJF World Ranking List (as of May 30, 2016) | 22 | Greece | Roman Moustopoulos |
| IJF World Ranking List (as of May 30, 2016) | 22 | United Arab Emirates | Sergiu Toma |
| IJF World Ranking List (as of May 30, 2016) | 22 | Egypt | Mohamed Abdelaal |
| IJF World Ranking List (as of May 30, 2016) | 22 | South Korea | Lee Seung-soo |
| IJF World Ranking List (as of May 30, 2016) | 22 | Mongolia | Uuganbaataryn Otgonbaatar |
| IJF World Ranking List (as of May 30, 2016) | 22 | Cuba | Iván Felipe Silva |
| IJF World Ranking List (as of May 30, 2016) | 22 | France | Loïc Pietri |
| IJF World Ranking List (as of May 30, 2016) | 22 | Hungary | László Csoknyai |
| IJF World Ranking List (as of May 30, 2016) | 22 | Uzbekistan | Shakhzodbek Sabirov |
| IJF World Ranking List (as of May 30, 2016) | 22 | Germany | Sven Maresch |
| IJF World Ranking List (as of May 30, 2016) | 22 | Australia | Eoin Coughlan |
| IJF World Ranking List (as of May 30, 2016) | 22 | Lebanon | Nacif Elias |
| IJF World Ranking List (as of May 30, 2016) | 22 | Sweden | Robin Pacek |
| IJF World Ranking List (as of May 30, 2016) | 22 | Netherlands | Frank de Wit |
| IJF World Ranking List (as of May 30, 2016) | 22 | Iran | Saeid Mollaei |
| Additional places (Europe) | 2 | Italy | Matteo Marconcini |
| Additional places (Europe) | 2 | Moldova | Valeriu Duminică |
| Additional places (Africa) | 2 | Mozambique | Marlon Acácio |
| Additional places (Africa) | 2 | Gabon | Paul Kibikai |
| Additional places (America) | 2 | Argentina | Emmanuel Lucenti |
| Additional places (America) | 2 | El Salvador | Juan Diego Turcios |
| Additional places (Asia) | 1 | Iraq | Hussein Al-Aameri |
| Additional places (Oceania) | 1 | Fiji | Josateki Naulu |
| Invitational | 2 | Montenegro | Srđan Mrvaljević |
| Invitational | 2 | Philippines | Kodo Nakano |
| Total | 33 | | |

=== Middleweight (90 kg) ===
| Section | Places | NOC | Qualified judoka |
|---|---|---|---|
| Host nation | 1 | Brazil | Tiago Camilo |
| IJF World Ranking List (as of May 30, 2016) | 22 | Japan | Mashu Baker |
| IJF World Ranking List (as of May 30, 2016) | 22 | South Korea | Gwak Dong-han |
| IJF World Ranking List (as of May 30, 2016) | 22 | Georgia | Varlam Liparteliani |
| IJF World Ranking List (as of May 30, 2016) | 22 | Hungary | Krisztián Tóth |
| IJF World Ranking List (as of May 30, 2016) | 22 | Sweden | Marcus Nyman |
| IJF World Ranking List (as of May 30, 2016) | 22 | Netherlands | Noël van 't End |
| IJF World Ranking List (as of May 30, 2016) | 22 | Russia | Kirill Denisov |
| IJF World Ranking List (as of May 30, 2016) | 22 | France | Alexandre Iddir |
| IJF World Ranking List (as of May 30, 2016) | 22 | Mongolia | Lkhagvasürengiin Otgonbaatar |
| IJF World Ranking List (as of May 30, 2016) | 22 | Tajikistan | Komronshokh Ustopiriyon |
| IJF World Ranking List (as of May 30, 2016) | 22 | Cuba | Asley González |
| IJF World Ranking List (as of May 30, 2016) | 22 | Serbia | Aleksandar Kukolj |
| IJF World Ranking List (as of May 30, 2016) | 22 | Greece | Ilias Iliadis |
| IJF World Ranking List (as of May 30, 2016) | 22 | Algeria | Abderahmane Benamadi |
| IJF World Ranking List (as of May 30, 2016) | 22 | Slovenia | Mihael Žgank |
| IJF World Ranking List (as of May 30, 2016) | 22 | Portugal | Célio Dias |
| IJF World Ranking List (as of May 30, 2016) | 22 | Switzerland | Ciril Grossklaus |
| IJF World Ranking List (as of May 30, 2016) | 22 | South Africa | Zack Piontek |
| IJF World Ranking List (as of May 30, 2016) | 22 | China | Cheng Xunzhao |
| IJF World Ranking List (as of May 30, 2016) | 22 | Azerbaijan | Mammadali Mehdiyev |
| IJF World Ranking List (as of May 30, 2016) | 22 | United States | Colton Brown |
| IJF World Ranking List (as of May 30, 2016) | 22 | Uzbekistan | Sherali Juraev |
| Additional places (Europe) | 2 | Germany | Marc Odenthal |
| Additional places (Europe) | 2 | Ukraine | Quedjau Nhabali |
| Additional places (Africa) | 2 | Kenya | Kiplangat Sang |
| Additional places (Africa) | 2 | Benin | Celtus Dossou Yovo |
| Additional places (America) | 2 | Chile | Thomas Briceño |
| Additional places (America) | 2 | Bolivia | Martín Michel |
| Additional places (Asia) | 2 | Jordan | Ibrahim Khalaf |
| Additional places (Asia) | 2 | India | Avtar Singh |
| Additional places (Oceania) | 1 | Nauru | Ovini Uera |
| Invitational | 3 | Refugee Olympic Team | Popole Misenga |
| Invitational | 3 | Belize | Renick James |
| Invitational | 3 | Sudan | Iszlam Monier Suliman |
| Total | 35 | | |

=== Half-heavyweight (100 kg) ===
| Section | Places | NOC | Qualified judoka |
|---|---|---|---|
| Host nation | 1 | Brazil | Rafael Buzacarini |
| IJF World Ranking List (as of May 30, 2016) | 22 | | |
| IJF World Ranking List (as of May 30, 2016) | 22 | Azerbaijan | Elmar Gasimov |
| IJF World Ranking List (as of May 30, 2016) | 22 | France | Cyrille Maret |
| IJF World Ranking List (as of May 30, 2016) | 22 | Czech Republic | Lukáš Krpálek |
| IJF World Ranking List (as of May 30, 2016) | 22 | Sweden | Martin Pacek |
| IJF World Ranking List (as of May 30, 2016) | 22 | Germany | Karl-Richard Frey |
| IJF World Ranking List (as of May 30, 2016) | 22 | Japan | Ryunosuke Haga |
| IJF World Ranking List (as of May 30, 2016) | 22 | Belgium | Toma Nikiforov |
| IJF World Ranking List (as of May 30, 2016) | 22 | Egypt | Ramadan Darwish |
| IJF World Ranking List (as of May 30, 2016) | 22 | Cuba | José Armenteros |
| IJF World Ranking List (as of May 30, 2016) | 22 | South Korea | Cho Gu-ham |
| IJF World Ranking List (as of May 30, 2016) | 22 | Netherlands | Henk Grol |
| IJF World Ranking List (as of May 30, 2016) | 22 | Georgia | Beka Gviniashvili |
| IJF World Ranking List (as of May 30, 2016) | 22 | Mongolia | Naidangiin Tüvshinbayar |
| IJF World Ranking List (as of May 30, 2016) | 22 | Algeria | Lyès Bouyacoub |
| IJF World Ranking List (as of May 30, 2016) | 22 | Canada | Kyle Reyes |
| IJF World Ranking List (as of May 30, 2016) | 22 | Russia | Tagir Khaibulaev |
| IJF World Ranking List (as of May 30, 2016) | 22 | Kazakhstan | Maxim Rakov |
| IJF World Ranking List (as of May 30, 2016) | 22 | Ukraine | Artem Bloshenko |
| IJF World Ranking List (as of May 30, 2016) | 22 | Hungary | Miklós Cirjenics |
| IJF World Ranking List (as of May 30, 2016) | 22 | Portugal | Jorge Fonseca |
| IJF World Ranking List (as of May 30, 2016) | 22 | Iran | Javad Mahjoub |
| IJF World Ranking List (as of May 30, 2016) | 22 | Latvia | Jevgeņijs Borodavko |
| Additional places (Europe) | 2 | Great Britain | Benjamin Fletcher |
| Additional places (Europe) | 2 | Estonia | Grigori Minaskin |
| Additional places (Africa) | 2 | Seychelles | Dominic Dugasse |
| Additional places (Africa) | 2 | Mali | Ayouba Traoré |
| Additional places (America) | 2 | Trinidad and Tobago | Christopher George |
| Additional places (America) | 2 | Uruguay | Pablo Aprahamian |
| Additional places (Asia) | 2 | United Arab Emirates | Ivan Remarenco |
| Additional places (Asia) | 2 | Pakistan | Shah Hussain Shah |
| Invitational | 3 | Afghanistan | Mohammad Tawfiq Bakhshi |
| Invitational | 3 | Myanmar | Yan Naing Soe |
| Invitational | 3 | ~~San Marino~~ | ~~Karim Gharbi~~ |
| Re-allocation of unused quota | 1 | Uzbekistan | Soyib Kurbonov |
| Total | 35 | | |

=== Heavyweight (+100 kg) ===
| Section | Places | NOC | Qualified judoka |
|---|---|---|---|
| Host nation | 1 | Brazil | Rafael Silva |
| IJF World Ranking List (as of May 30, 2016) | 22 | France | Teddy Riner |
| IJF World Ranking List (as of May 30, 2016) | 22 | Japan | Hisayoshi Harasawa |
| IJF World Ranking List (as of May 30, 2016) | 22 | Ukraine | Yakiv Khammo |
| IJF World Ranking List (as of May 30, 2016) | 22 | Netherlands | Roy Meyer |
| IJF World Ranking List (as of May 30, 2016) | 22 | Israel | Or Sasson |
| IJF World Ranking List (as of May 30, 2016) | 22 | Romania | Daniel Natea |
| IJF World Ranking List (as of May 30, 2016) | 22 | Hungary | Barna Bor |
| IJF World Ranking List (as of May 30, 2016) | 22 | Tunisia | Faicel Jaballah |
| IJF World Ranking List (as of May 30, 2016) | 22 | Georgia | Adam Okruashvili |
| IJF World Ranking List (as of May 30, 2016) | 22 | Russia | Renat Saidov |
| IJF World Ranking List (as of May 30, 2016) | 22 | South Korea | Kim Sung-min |
| IJF World Ranking List (as of May 30, 2016) | 22 | Germany | André Breitbarth |
| IJF World Ranking List (as of May 30, 2016) | 22 | Poland | Maciej Sarnacki |
| IJF World Ranking List (as of May 30, 2016) | 22 | Algeria | Mohamed-Amine Tayeb |
| IJF World Ranking List (as of May 30, 2016) | 22 | Uzbekistan | Abdullo Tangriev |
| IJF World Ranking List (as of May 30, 2016) | 22 | Mongolia | Temuulen Battulga |
| IJF World Ranking List (as of May 30, 2016) | 22 | Kyrgyzstan | Iurii Krakovetskii |
| IJF World Ranking List (as of May 30, 2016) | 22 | Azerbaijan | Ushangi Kokauri |
| IJF World Ranking List (as of May 30, 2016) | 22 | Egypt | Islam El Shehaby |
| IJF World Ranking List (as of May 30, 2016) | 22 | Austria | Daniel Allerstorfer |
| IJF World Ranking List (as of May 30, 2016) | 22 | Cuba | Alex García Mendoza |
| IJF World Ranking List (as of May 30, 2016) | 22 | Ecuador | Freddy Figueroa |
| Additional places (Europe) | 2 | Iceland | Thormodur Jonsson |
| Additional places (Europe) | 2 | Latvia | Artūrs Ņikiforenko |
| Additional places (Africa) | 2 | Burkina Faso | Rachid Sidibe |
| Additional places (Africa) | 2 | Republic of the Congo | Deo Gracia Ngokaba |
| Additional places (America) | 1 | Honduras | Ramón Pileta |
| Additional places (Asia) | 2 | Tajikistan | Mukhamadmurod Abdurakhmonov |
| Additional places (Asia) | 2 | Thailand | Kunathip Yea-on |
| Additional places (Oceania) | 1 | Samoa | Derek Sua |
| Invitational | 0 | — | — |
| Total | 31 | | |

== Women's events ==
=== Extra-lightweight (48 kg) ===
| Section | Places | NOC | Qualified judoka |
|---|---|---|---|
| Host nation | 1 | Brazil | Sarah Menezes |
| IJF World Ranking List (as of May 30, 2016) | 14 | Mongolia | Mönkhbatyn Urantsetseg |
| IJF World Ranking List (as of May 30, 2016) | 14 | Argentina | Paula Pareto |
| IJF World Ranking List (as of May 30, 2016) | 14 | Japan | Ami Kondo |
| IJF World Ranking List (as of May 30, 2016) | 14 | Spain | Julia Figueroa |
| IJF World Ranking List (as of May 30, 2016) | 14 | Kazakhstan | Galbadrakhyn Otgontsetseg |
| IJF World Ranking List (as of May 30, 2016) | 14 | Hungary | Éva Csernoviczki |
| IJF World Ranking List (as of May 30, 2016) | 14 | South Korea | Jeong Bo-kyeong |
| IJF World Ranking List (as of May 30, 2016) | 14 | Belgium | Charline van Snick |
| IJF World Ranking List (as of May 30, 2016) | 14 | Guinea-Bissau | Taciana Lima |
| IJF World Ranking List (as of May 30, 2016) | 14 | Romania | Monica Ungureanu |
| IJF World Ranking List (as of May 30, 2016) | 14 | Russia | Irina Dolgova |
| IJF World Ranking List (as of May 30, 2016) | 14 | Turkey | Dilara Lokmanhekim |
| IJF World Ranking List (as of May 30, 2016) | 14 | Ukraine | Maryna Cherniak |
| IJF World Ranking List (as of May 30, 2016) | 14 | Cuba | Dayaris Mestre |
| Additional places (Europe) | 2 | France | Laëtitia Payet |
| Additional places (Europe) | 2 | Israel | Shira Rishony |
| Additional places (Africa) | 1 | Madagascar | Asaramanitra Ratiarison |
| Additional places (America) | 1 | Mexico | Edna Carrillo |
| Additional places (Asia) | 2 | North Korea | Kim Sol-mi |
| Additional places (Asia) | 2 | Vietnam | Văn Ngọc Tú |
| Additional places (Oceania) | 1 | Australia | Chloe Rayner |
| Invitational | 0 | — | — |
| Re-allocation of unused quota | 1 | Italy | Valentina Moscatt |
| Total | 23 | | |

=== Half-lightweight (52 kg) ===
| Section | Places | NOC | Qualified judoka |
|---|---|---|---|
| Host nation | 1 | Brazil | Érika Miranda |
| IJF World Ranking List (as of May 30, 2016) | 14 | Romania | Andreea Chițu |
| IJF World Ranking List (as of May 30, 2016) | 14 | Kosovo | Majlinda Kelmendi |
| IJF World Ranking List (as of May 30, 2016) | 14 | Japan | Misato Nakamura |
| IJF World Ranking List (as of May 30, 2016) | 14 | China | Ma Yingnan |
| IJF World Ranking List (as of May 30, 2016) | 14 | Russia | Natalia Kuziutina |
| IJF World Ranking List (as of May 30, 2016) | 14 | Italy | Odette Giuffrida |
| IJF World Ranking List (as of May 30, 2016) | 14 | Israel | Gili Cohen |
| IJF World Ranking List (as of May 30, 2016) | 14 | France | Priscilla Gneto |
| IJF World Ranking List (as of May 30, 2016) | 14 | Germany | Mareen Kräh |
| IJF World Ranking List (as of May 30, 2016) | 14 | Turkmenistan | Gulbadam Babamuratova |
| IJF World Ranking List (as of May 30, 2016) | 14 | Portugal | Joana Ramos |
| IJF World Ranking List (as of May 30, 2016) | 14 | Mongolia | Adiyaasambuugiin Tsolmon |
| IJF World Ranking List (as of May 30, 2016) | 14 | Tunisia | Hela Ayari |
| IJF World Ranking List (as of May 30, 2016) | 14 | Switzerland | Evelyne Tschopp |
| Additional places (Europe) | 2 | Belarus | Darya Skrypnik |
| Additional places (Europe) | 2 | Spain | Laura Gómez |
| Additional places (Africa) | 1 | Mauritius | Christianne Legentil |
| Additional places (America) | 2 | Canada | Ecaterina Guica |
| Additional places (America) | 2 | United States | Angelica Delgado |
| Additional places (Asia) | 0 | — | — |
| Additional places (Oceania) | 0 | — | — |
| Invitational | 1 | Burundi | Antoinette Gasongo |
| Total | 21 | | |

=== Lightweight (57 kg) ===
| Section | Places | NOC | Qualified judoka |
|---|---|---|---|
| Host nation | 1 | Brazil | Rafaela Silva |
| IJF World Ranking List (as of May 30, 2016) | 14 | Mongolia | Dorjsürengiin Sumiyaa |
| IJF World Ranking List (as of May 30, 2016) | 14 | South Korea | Kim Jan-di |
| IJF World Ranking List (as of May 30, 2016) | 14 | United States | Marti Malloy |
| IJF World Ranking List (as of May 30, 2016) | 14 | Japan | Kaori Matsumoto |
| IJF World Ranking List (as of May 30, 2016) | 14 | France | Automne Pavia |
| IJF World Ranking List (as of May 30, 2016) | 14 | Romania | Corina Căprioriu |
| IJF World Ranking List (as of May 30, 2016) | 14 | Canada | Catherine Beauchemin-Pinard |
| IJF World Ranking List (as of May 30, 2016) | 14 | Portugal | Telma Monteiro |
| IJF World Ranking List (as of May 30, 2016) | 14 | Great Britain | Nekoda Smythe-Davis |
| IJF World Ranking List (as of May 30, 2016) | 14 | Chinese Taipei | Lien Chen-ling |
| IJF World Ranking List (as of May 30, 2016) | 14 | Hungary | Hedvig Karakas |
| IJF World Ranking List (as of May 30, 2016) | 14 | Austria | Sabrina Filzmoser |
| IJF World Ranking List (as of May 30, 2016) | 14 | Germany | Miryam Roper |
| IJF World Ranking List (as of May 30, 2016) | 14 | Kosovo | Nora Gjakova |
| Additional places (Europe) | 2 | Netherlands | Sanne Verhagen |
| Additional places (Europe) | 2 | Poland | Arleta Podolak |
| Additional places (Africa) | 2 | Senegal | Hortense Diédhiou |
| Additional places (Africa) | 2 | Ivory Coast | Zouleiha Abzetta Dabonne |
| Additional places (America) | 1 | Colombia | Yadinis Amaris |
| Additional places (Asia) | 1 | Turkmenistan | Rushana Nurjavova |
| Additional places (Oceania) | 1 | New Zealand | Darcina Manuel |
| Invitational | 0 | — | — |
| Total | 22 | | |

=== Half-middleweight (63 kg) ===
| Section | Places | NOC | Qualified judoka |
|---|---|---|---|
| Host nation | 1 | Brazil | Mariana Silva |
| IJF World Ranking List (as of May 30, 2016) | 14 | Slovenia | Tina Trstenjak |
| IJF World Ranking List (as of May 30, 2016) | 14 | France | Clarisse Agbegnenou |
| IJF World Ranking List (as of May 30, 2016) | 14 | Israel | Yarden Gerbi |
| IJF World Ranking List (as of May 30, 2016) | 14 | Germany | Martyna Trajdos |
| IJF World Ranking List (as of May 30, 2016) | 14 | Austria | Kathrin Unterwurzacher |
| IJF World Ranking List (as of May 30, 2016) | 14 | Mongolia | Tsedevsürengiin Mönkhzayaa |
| IJF World Ranking List (as of May 30, 2016) | 14 | Japan | Miku Tashiro |
| IJF World Ranking List (as of May 30, 2016) | 14 | Great Britain | Alice Schlesinger |
| IJF World Ranking List (as of May 30, 2016) | 14 | Netherlands | Anicka van Emden |
| IJF World Ranking List (as of May 30, 2016) | 14 | Italy | Edwige Gwend |
| IJF World Ranking List (as of May 30, 2016) | 14 | China | Yang Junxia |
| IJF World Ranking List (as of May 30, 2016) | 14 | Russia | Ekaterina Valkova |
| IJF World Ranking List (as of May 30, 2016) | 14 | Cuba | Maricet Espinosa |
| IJF World Ranking List (as of May 30, 2016) | 14 | Australia | Katharina Haecker |
| Additional places (Europe) | 2 | Sweden | Mia Hermansson |
| Additional places (Europe) | 2 | Turkey | Büşra Katipoğlu |
| Additional places (Africa) | 2 | Ghana | Szandra Szögedi |
| Additional places (Africa) | 2 | Morocco | Rizlen Zouak |
| Additional places (America) | 1 | Ecuador | Estefania García |
| Additional places (Asia) | 2 | South Korea | Bak Ji-yun |
| Additional places (Asia) | 2 | Kazakhstan | Marian Urdabayeva |
| Additional places (Oceania) | 0 | — | — |
| Invitational | 4 | Andorra | Laura Sallés |
| Invitational | 4 | Guinea | Mamadama Bangoura |
| Invitational | 4 | Macedonia | Katerina Nikoloska |
| Invitational | 4 | Nepal | Phupu Lhamu Khatri |
| Total | 26 | | |

=== Middleweight (70 kg) ===
| Section | Places | NOC | Qualified judoka |
|---|---|---|---|
| Host nation | 1 | Brazil | Maria Portela |
| IJF World Ranking List (as of May 30, 2016) | 14 | Netherlands | Kim Polling |
| IJF World Ranking List (as of May 30, 2016) | 14 | France | Gévrise Émane |
| IJF World Ranking List (as of May 30, 2016) | 14 | Germany | Laura Vargas Koch |
| IJF World Ranking List (as of May 30, 2016) | 14 | Colombia | Yuri Alvear |
| IJF World Ranking List (as of May 30, 2016) | 14 | Spain | María Bernabéu |
| IJF World Ranking List (as of May 30, 2016) | 14 | Austria | Bernadette Graf |
| IJF World Ranking List (as of May 30, 2016) | 14 | South Korea | Kim Seong-yeon |
| IJF World Ranking List (as of May 30, 2016) | 14 | Canada | Kelita Zupancic |
| IJF World Ranking List (as of May 30, 2016) | 14 | Israel | Linda Bolder |
| IJF World Ranking List (as of May 30, 2016) | 14 | Japan | Haruka Tachimoto |
| IJF World Ranking List (as of May 30, 2016) | 14 | Great Britain | Sally Conway |
| IJF World Ranking List (as of May 30, 2016) | 14 | Morocco | Assmaa Niang |
| IJF World Ranking List (as of May 30, 2016) | 14 | Poland | Katarzyna Kłys |
| IJF World Ranking List (as of May 30, 2016) | 14 | Mongolia | Tsend-Ayuushiin Naranjargal |
| Additional places (Europe) | 2 | Croatia | Barbara Matić |
| Additional places (Europe) | 2 | Georgia | Esther Stam |
| Additional places (Africa) | 2 | Angola | Antonia Moreira |
| Additional places (Africa) | 2 | Tunisia | Houda Miled |
| Additional places (America) | 2 | Puerto Rico | María Pérez |
| Additional places (America) | 2 | Venezuela | Elvismar Rodríguez |
| Additional places (Asia) | 2 | China | Zhou Chao |
| Additional places (Asia) | 2 | Uzbekistan | Gulnoza Matniyazova |
| Additional places (Oceania) | 0 | — | — |
| Invitational | 1 | Refugee Olympic Team | Yolande Mabika |
| Total | 24 | | |

=== Half-heavyweight (78 kg) ===
| Section | Places | NOC | Qualified judoka |
|---|---|---|---|
| Host nation | 1 | Brazil | Mayra Aguiar |
| IJF World Ranking List (as of May 30, 2016) | 14 | United States | Kayla Harrison |
| IJF World Ranking List (as of May 30, 2016) | 14 | France | Audrey Tcheumeo |
| IJF World Ranking List (as of May 30, 2016) | 14 | Netherlands | Marhinde Verkerk |
| IJF World Ranking List (as of May 30, 2016) | 14 | Germany | Luise Malzahn |
| IJF World Ranking List (as of May 30, 2016) | 14 | Slovenia | Anamari Velenšek |
| IJF World Ranking List (as of May 30, 2016) | 14 | Great Britain | Natalie Powell |
| IJF World Ranking List (as of May 30, 2016) | 14 | Japan | Mami Umeki |
| IJF World Ranking List (as of May 30, 2016) | 14 | Hungary | Abigél Joó |
| IJF World Ranking List (as of May 30, 2016) | 14 | North Korea | Sol Kyong |
| IJF World Ranking List (as of May 30, 2016) | 14 | Ukraine | Viktoriya Turks |
| IJF World Ranking List (as of May 30, 2016) | 14 | China | Zhang Zhehui |
| IJF World Ranking List (as of May 30, 2016) | 14 | Poland | Daria Pogorzelec |
| IJF World Ranking List (as of May 30, 2016) | 14 | Australia | Miranda Giambelli |
| IJF World Ranking List (as of May 30, 2016) | 14 | Gabon | Sarah Myriam Mazouz |
| Additional places (Europe) | 0 | — | — |
| Additional places (Africa) | 1 | Cameroon | Hortence Atangana |
| Additional places (America) | 1 | Cuba | Yalennis Castillo |
| Additional places (Asia) | 1 | Mongolia | Pürevjargalyn Lkhamdegd |
| Additional places (Oceania) | 0 | — | — |
| Invitational | 0 | — | — |
| Total | 18 | | |

=== Heavyweight (+78 kg) ===
| Section | Places | NOC | Qualified judoka |
|---|---|---|---|
| Host nation | 1 | Brazil | Maria Suellen Altheman |
| IJF World Ranking List (as of May 30, 2016) | 14 | China | Yu Song |
| IJF World Ranking List (as of May 30, 2016) | 14 | Cuba | Idalys Ortíz |
| IJF World Ranking List (as of May 30, 2016) | 14 | France | Émilie Andéol |
| IJF World Ranking List (as of May 30, 2016) | 14 | Japan | Kanae Yamabe |
| IJF World Ranking List (as of May 30, 2016) | 14 | Tunisia | Nihal Chikhrouhou |
| IJF World Ranking List (as of May 30, 2016) | 14 | Ukraine | Svitlana Iaromka |
| IJF World Ranking List (as of May 30, 2016) | 14 | Germany | Jasmin Külbs |
| IJF World Ranking List (as of May 30, 2016) | 14 | South Korea | Kim Min-jung |
| IJF World Ranking List (as of May 30, 2016) | 14 | Turkey | Kayra Sayit |
| IJF World Ranking List (as of May 30, 2016) | 14 | Netherlands | Tessie Savelkouls |
| IJF World Ranking List (as of May 30, 2016) | 14 | Mexico | Vanessa Zambotti |
| IJF World Ranking List (as of May 30, 2016) | 14 | Russia | Ksenia Chibisova |
| IJF World Ranking List (as of May 30, 2016) | 14 | Puerto Rico | Melissa Mojica |
| IJF World Ranking List (as of May 30, 2016) | 14 | Bosnia and Herzegovina | Larisa Cerić |
| Additional places (Europe) | 1 | Lithuania | Santa Pakenytė |
| Additional places (Africa) | 1 | Algeria | Sonia Asselah |
| Additional places (America) | 0 | — | — |
| Additional places (Asia) | 0 | — | — |
| Additional places (Oceania) | 0 | — | — |
| Invitational | | | |
| Total | 17 | | |
