= 2015 World Judo Championships – Men's 90 kg =

Judo competition

Judo Men's 90 kg at the 2015 World Judo Championships
- Venue: Alau Ice Palace
- Location: Astana, Kazakhstan
- Date: 28 August
- Competitors: 62 from 49 nations
- Total prize money: 14,000$

Medalists
gold medal	Gwak Dong-han (1st title)	South Korea
silver medal	Kirill Denisov	Russia
bronze medal	Mashu Baker	Japan
bronze medal	Varlam Liparteliani	Georgia

Competition at external databases
- Links: IJF • JudoInside

The men's 90 kg competition of the 2015 World Judo Championships was held on 28 August 2015.

== Results ==
=== Finals ===
Semi-finals
(Russia) Kirill Denisov	100
(Georgia (country)) Beka Gviniashvili	000
(Tajikistan) Komronshokh Ustopiriyon	000
(South Korea) Gwak Dong-han	001

Final
(Russia) Kirill Denisov	000
(South Korea) Gwak Dong-han	010

=== Repechage ===
Repechage		Third place
(Hungary) Krisztián Tóth	000
(Japan) Mashu Baker	001	(Japan) Mashu Baker	100
		(Tajikistan) Komronshokh Ustopiriyon	000

Repechage		Third place
(Germany) Aaron Hildebrand	000
(Georgia (country)) Varlam Liparteliani	100	(Georgia (country)) Varlam Liparteliani	100
		(Georgia (country)) Beka Gviniashvili	000

=== Pool A ===
First Round
(Lebanon) Francois Saade	000
(Slovakia) Milan Randl	100
(Czech Republic) Alexandr Jurečka	101
(Nauru) Ovini Uera	000
(Morocco) Imad Abdellaoui	000
(United States) Colton Brown	100
(Russia) Kirill Denisov	000
(Brazil) Tiago Camilo	000
(Australia) Sebastian Temesi	000
(Chile) Rafael Romo	001
(Jordan) Ibrahim Khalaf	110
(Fiji) Tevita Takayawa	000
(Israel) Li Kochman	000
(Netherlands) Guillaume Elmont	010

Second Round
(Hungary) Krisztián Tóth	101
(Slovakia) Milan Randl	000
(Czech Republic) Alexandr Jurečka	000
(United States) Colton Brown	000
(Russia) Kirill Denisov	101
(Chile) Rafael Romo	000
(Jordan) Ibrahim Khalaf	000
(Netherlands) Guillaume Elmont	100

Third Round
(Hungary) Krisztián Tóth	001
(Czech Republic) Alexandr Jurečka	000
(Russia) Kirill Denisov	100
(Netherlands) Guillaume Elmont	000

Quarterfinals
(Hungary) Krisztián Tóth	000
(Russia) Kirill Denisov	000

=== Pool B ===
First Round
(Georgia (country)) Beka Gviniashvili	100
(Ukraine) Quedjau Nhabali	000
(Poland) Patryk Ciechomski	000
(Switzerland) Domenik Wenzinger	000
(Cameroon) Dieudonné Dolassem	000
(Azerbaijan) Mammadali Mehdiyev	100
(Finland) Samuli Viitanen	000
(Serbia) Aleksandar Kukolj	101
(Japan) Mashu Baker	011
(Uzbekistan) Sherali Juraev	000
(South Africa) Zack Piontek	101
(Sweden) Joakim Dvärby	000
(Egypt) Hatem Abd el Akher	100
(Lithuania) Žilvinas Lekavičius	000
(Spain) Nikoloz Sherazadishvili	101
(Latvia) Aigars Mīlenbergs	000

Second Round
(Georgia (country)) Beka Gviniashvili	101
(Poland) Patryk Ciechomski	000
(Azerbaijan) Mammadali Mehdiyev	000
(Serbia) Aleksandar Kukolj	000
(Japan) Mashu Baker	100
(South Africa) Zack Piontek	000
(Egypt) Hatem Abd el Akher	010
(Spain) Nikoloz Sherazadishvili	000

Third Round
(Georgia (country)) Beka Gviniashvili	101
(Serbia) Aleksandar Kukolj	000
(Japan) Mashu Baker	101
(Egypt) Hatem Abd el Akher	000

Quarterfinals
(Georgia (country)) Beka Gviniashvili	001
(Japan) Mashu Baker	000

=== Pool C ===
First Round
(Italy) Walter Facente	000
(China) Cheng Xunzhao	102
(Tajikistan) Komronshokh Ustopiriyon	001
(Lithuania) Karolis Bauža	000
(Mexico) Isao Cárdenas	110
(Benin) Celtus Dossou Yovo	010
(Greece) Ilias Iliadis	100
(Switzerland) Ciril Grossklaus	000
(Mongolia) Otgonbaataryn Lkhagvasuren	100
(Sweden) Marcus Nyman	000
(Cuba) Asley González	001
(Hungary) Gábor Vér	000
(Portugal) Célio Dias	002
(Germany) Aaron Hildebrand	010

Second Round
(Netherlands) Noël van 't End	011
(China) Cheng Xunzhao	000
(Tajikistan) Komronshokh Ustopiriyon	100
(Mexico) Isao Cárdenas	000
(Greece) Ilias Iliadis	000
(Mongolia) Otgonbaataryn Lkhagvasuren	100
(Cuba) Asley González	000
(Germany) Aaron Hildebrand	000

Third Round
(Netherlands) Noël van 't End	000
(Tajikistan) Komronshokh Ustopiriyon	100
(Mongolia) Otgonbaataryn Lkhagvasuren	001
(Germany) Aaron Hildebrand	011

Quarterfinals
(Tajikistan) Komronshokh Ustopiriyon	000
(Germany) Aaron Hildebrand	000

=== Pool D ===
First Round
(Georgia (country)) Varlam Liparteliani	100
(United Arab Emirates) Mihail Marchitan	000
(United States) Jacob Larsen	100
(Algeria) Abderrahmane Benamadi	010
(France) Alexandre Iddir	101
(Finland) Jaakko Alli	000
(Australia) Diego Barreto	000
(Kazakhstan) Islam Bozbayev	100
(South Korea) Gwak Dong-han	101
(Dominican Republic) Robert Florentino	000
(Chile) Thomas Briceño	000
(Ukraine) Vadym Synyavsky	100
(Philippines) Kenji Yahata	000
(Estonia) Aleksandr Marmeljuk	100

Second Round
(Georgia (country)) Varlam Liparteliani	100
(United States) Jacob Larsen	000
(France) Alexandre Iddir	110
(Kazakhstan) Islam Bozbayev	000
(South Korea) Gwak Dong-han	110
(Ukraine) Vadym Synyavsky	000
(Spain) David Ruiz	100
(Estonia) Aleksandr Marmeljuk	000

Third Round
(Georgia (country)) Varlam Liparteliani	100
(France) Alexandre Iddir	001
(South Korea) Gwak Dong-han	002
(Spain) David Ruiz	000

Quarterfinals
(Georgia (country)) Varlam Liparteliani	000
(South Korea) Gwak Dong-han	001

== Prize money ==
The sums listed bring the total prizes awarded to 14,000$ for the individual event.

Medal	Total	Judoka	Coach
Gold	6,000$	4,800$	1,200$
Silver	4,000$	3,200$	800$
Bronze	2,000$	1,600$	400$
