= Judo at the 2015 European Games – Men's 90 kg =

Judo competition

Judo Men's 90 kg at the 2015 European Games
- Venue: Heydar Aliyev Arena
- Location: Baku, Azerbaijan
- Date: 27 June
- Competitors: 34 from 25 nations

Medalists
gold medal	Kirill Denisov (2nd title)	Russia
silver medal	Varlam Liparteliani	Georgia
bronze medal	Ilias Iliadis	Greece
bronze medal	Guillaume Elmont	Netherlands

Competition at external databases
- Links: IJF • JudoInside

The men's 90 kg judo event at the 2015 European Games in Baku was held on 27 June at the Heydar Aliyev Arena.

== Results ==
=== Finals ===
Semifinals
Krisztián Tóth (HUN)	000
Kirill Denisov (RUS)	000
Varlam Liparteliani (GEO)	110
Beka Gviniashvili (GEO)	000

Final
Kirill Denisov (RUS)	001
Varlam Liparteliani (GEO)	000

=== Repechage ===
Repechage
Aleksandar Kukolj (SRB)	000
Ilias Iliadis (GRE)	000

Third place
Ilias Iliadis (GRE)	000
Beka Gviniashvili (GEO)	000

Repechage
Mihael Žgank (SLO)	000
Guillaume Elmont (NED)	011

Third place
Guillaume Elmont (NED)	000
Krisztián Tóth (HUN)	000

=== Pool A ===
Round of 64

Round of 32
Krisztián Tóth (HUN)	000
Marcus Nyman (SWE)	000
Ramin Gurbanov (AZE)	101
Célio Dias (POR)	000
Aleksandar Kukolj (SRB)	100
Aleksandr Marmeljuk (EST)	000
Alexandr Jurečka (CZE)	000
Quedjau Nhabali (UKR)	010

Round of 16
Krisztián Tóth (HUN)	000
Ramin Gurbanov (AZE)	000
Aleksandar Kukolj (SRB)	100
Quedjau Nhabali (UKR)	000

Quarterfinals
Krisztián Tóth (HUN)	101
Aleksandar Kukolj (SRB)	000

=== Pool B ===
Round of 64
Domenik Wenzinger (SUI)	100
Frazer Chamberlain (GBR)	000

Round of 32
Ilias Iliadis (GRE)	101
David Kukovica (SLO)	000
Marc Odenthal (GER)	112
Alon Sasson (ISR)	000
Kirill Denisov (RUS)	100
Domenik Wenzinger (SUI)	000
Walter Facente (ITA)	100
Patryk Ciechomski (POL)	000

Round of 16
Ilias Iliadis (GRE)	010
Marc Odenthal (GER)	000
Kirill Denisov (RUS)	100
Walter Facente (ITA)	000

Quarterfinals
Ilias Iliadis (GRE)	000
Kirill Denisov (RUS)	000

=== Pool C ===
Round of 64
Milan Randl (SVK)	000
Karolis Bauža (LTU)	100

Round of 32
Varlam Liparteliani (GEO)	100
Gábor Vér (HUN)	000
Vadym Synyavsky (UKR)	010
Nikoloz Sherazadishvili (ESP)	010
Alexandre Iddir (FRA)	100
Karolis Bauža (LTU)	000
Mihael Žgank (SLO)	001
Joakim Dvärby (SWE)	000

Round of 16
Varlam Liparteliani (GEO)	100
Nikoloz Sherazadishvili (ESP)	001
Alexandre Iddir (FRA)	000
Mihael Žgank (SLO)	010

Quarterfinals
Varlam Liparteliani (GEO)	010
Mihael Žgank (SLO)	000

=== Pool D ===
Round of 64

Round of 32
Beka Gviniashvili (GEO)	100
Batuhan Efemgil (TUR)	000
David Klammert (CZE)	000
Dmitri Gerasimenko (SRB)	100
Kirill Voprosov (RUS)	000
Ciril Grossklaus (SUI)	010
Guillaume Elmont (NED)	010
Aigars Mīlenbergs (LAT)	000

Round of 16
Beka Gviniashvili (GEO)	100
Dmitri Gerasimenko (SRB)	000
Ciril Grossklaus (SUI)	000
Guillaume Elmont (NED)	100

Quarterfinals
Beka Gviniashvili (GEO)	100
Guillaume Elmont (NED)	000
