= 2019 World Judo Championships – Men's 90 kg =

Judo competition

Judo Men's 90 kg at the 2019 World Judo Championships
- Venue: Nippon Budokan
- Location: Tokyo, Japan
- Date: 29 August
- Competitors: 69 from 57 nations
- Total prize money: 57,000$

Medalists
gold medal	Noël van 't End (1st title)	Netherlands
silver medal	Shoichiro Mukai	Japan
bronze medal	Axel Clerget	France
bronze medal	Nemanja Majdov	Serbia

Competition at external databases
- Links: IJF • JudoInside

The Men's 90 kg competition at the 2019 World Judo Championships was held on 29 August 2019.

== Results ==
=== Finals ===
Semi-finals
(Netherlands) Noël van 't End	10
(Serbia) Nemanja Majdov	00
(Sweden) Marcus Nyman	00
(Japan) Shoichiro Mukai	10

Final
(Netherlands) Noël van 't End	01
(Japan) Shoichiro Mukai	00

=== Repechage ===
Repechage
(France) Axel Clerget	10
(Azerbaijan) Mammadali Mehdiyev	00

Third place
(France) Axel Clerget	10
(Sweden) Marcus Nyman	00

Repechage
(Hungary) Krisztián Tóth	01
(Cuba) Ivan Silva	00

Third place
(Hungary) Krisztián Tóth	00
(Serbia) Nemanja Majdov	10

=== Pool A ===
Preliminary round

	Score	
John Ferrer (Philippines)	00–10	(Democratic Republic of the Congo) Eyale Le Beau
Celtus Dossou Yovo (Benin)	00–10	(Australia) Harrison Cassar

First round
(Spain) Nikoloz Sherazadishvili	10
(Democratic Republic of the Congo) Eyale Le Beau	00
(United Kingdom) Frazer Chmaberlain	00
(France) Axel Clerget	10
(San Marino) Paolo Persoglia	00
(United States) Colton Brown	10
(Slovakia) Milan Randl	00
(Kazakhstan) Islam Bozbayev	10
(South Korea) Gwak Dong-han	10
(Turkmenistan) Tejen Tejenov	00
(Estonia) Klen Kaljulaid	10
(Peru) Yuta Galarreta	00
(Germany) Eduard Trippel	00
(Netherlands) Noël van 't End	11
(Guinea) Abdoulaye Millimono	00
(Australia) Harrison Cassar	10

Second round
(Spain) Nikoloz Sherazadishvili	00
(France) Axel Clerget	01
(United States) Colton Brown	10
(Kazakhstan) Islam Bozbayev	00
(South Korea) Gwak Dong-han	10
(Estonia) Klen Kaljulaid	00
(Netherlands) Noël van 't End	10
(Australia) Harrison Cassar	00

Third round
(France) Axel Clerget	10
(United States) Colton Brown	00
(South Korea) Gwak Dong-han	00
(Netherlands) Noël van 't End	10

Quarterfinals
(France) Axel Clerget	00
(Netherlands) Noël van 't End	01

=== Pool B ===
Preliminary round

	Score	
Jiří Petr (Czech Republic)	10–00	(Latvia) Dāvis Dūda

First round
(Azerbaijan) Mammadali Mehdiyev	10
(Czech Republic) Jiří Petr	00
(Mauritius) Rémi Feuillet	10
(Kuwait) Talal Al-Enezi	00
(Kenya) John Kirimi	00
(Turkey) Mikail Özerler	11
(China) Wang Xuewen	00
(Belarus) Yahor Varapayeu	10
(Serbia) Nemanja Majdov	01
(Egypt) Hatem Abd el Akher	00
(Austria) Johannes Pacher	11
(Jordan) Mohamed Hayari	00
Popole Misenga	00
(Italy) Matteo Marconcini	10
(Thailand) Kittipong Hantratin	00
(Israel) Li Kochman	10

Second round
(Azerbaijan) Mammadali Mehdiyev	01
(Mauritius) Rémi Feuillet	00
(Turkey) Mikail Özerler	10
(Belarus) Yahor Varapayeu	00
(Serbia) Nemanja Majdov	10
(Austria) Johannes Pacher	00
(Italy) Matteo Marconcini	01
(Israel) Li Kochman	10

Third round
(Azerbaijan) Mammadali Mehdiyev	11
(Turkey) Mikail Özerler	00
(Serbia) Nemanja Majdov	11
(Israel) Li Kochman	01

Quarterfinals
(Azerbaijan) Mammadali Mehdiyev	00
(Serbia) Nemanja Majdov	10

=== Pool C ===
Preliminary round

	Score	
Yakhyo Imamov (Uzbekistan)	01–10	(Sweden) Marcus Nyman

First round
(Hungary) Krisztián Tóth	10
(Canada) Zachary Burt	00
(Austria) Marko Bubanja	01
(Peru) Daryl Yamamoto	10
(Mongolia) Gantulga Altanbagana	00
(Italy) Nicholas Mungai	10
(Kyrgyzstan) Erlan Sherov	00
(Estonia) Mattias Kuusik	10
(Serbia) Aleksandar Kukolj	10
(Dominican Republic) Robert Florentino	00
(Egypt) Ali Hazem	00
(Sweden) Marcus Nyman	10
(Ghana) Victor Ahiavor	00
(Switzerland) Ciril Grossklaus	01
(Czech Republic) David Klammert	10
(Nauru) Iniki Uera	00

Second round
(Hungary) Krisztián Tóth	01
(Peru) Daryl Yamamoto	00
(Italy) Nicholas Mungai	00
(Estonia) Mattias Kuusik	10
(Serbia) Aleksandar Kukolj	00
(Sweden) Marcus Nyman	10
(Switzerland) Ciril Grossklaus	10
(Czech Republic) David Klammert	00

Third round
(Hungary) Krisztián Tóth	10
(Estonia) Mattias Kuusik	00
(Sweden) Marcus Nyman	10
(Switzerland) Ciril Grossklaus	00

Quarterfinals
(Hungary) Krisztián Tóth	00
(Sweden) Marcus Nyman	11

=== Pool D ===
Preliminary round

	Score	
Nantenaina Finesse (Seychelles)	00–10	(Slovakia) Peter Žilka

First round
(Cuba) Ivan Silva	10
(Finland) Aatu Laamanen	00
(Algeria) Abderrahmane Benamadi	10
(Colombia) Francisco Balanta	01
(Tajikistan) Komronshokh Ustopiriyon	00
(United Kingdom) Max Stewart	01
(Brazil) Rafael Macedo	01
(China) Bu Hebilige	00
(Georgia (country)) Beka Gviniashvili	10
(India) Ajay Mistry	00
(Netherlands) Jesper Smink	01
(Ukraine) Quedjau Nhabali	00
(Slovakia) Peter Žilka	10
(Iceland) Egill Blöndal	00
(Japan) Shoichiro Mukai	10
(Belarus) Viktar Kliavusau	00

Second round
(Cuba) Ivan Silva	10
(Algeria) Abderrahmane Benamadi	00
(United Kingdom) Max Stewart	01
(Brazil) Rafael Macedo	00
(Georgia (country)) Beka Gviniashvili	00
(Netherlands) Jesper Smink	10
(Slovakia) Peter Žilka	00
(Japan) Shoichiro Mukai	11

Third round
(Cuba) Ivan Silva	10
(United Kingdom) Max Stewart	00
(Netherlands) Jesper Smink	00
(Japan) Shoichiro Mukai	11

Quarterfinals
(Cuba) Ivan Silva	00
(Japan) Shoichiro Mukai	10

== Prize money ==
The sums listed bring the total prizes awarded to 57,000$ for the individual event.

Medal	Total	Judoka	Coach
Gold	26,000$	20,800$	5,200$
Silver	15,000$	12,000$	3,000$
Bronze	8,000$	6,400$	1,600$
