= Judo at the 2014 Asian Games – Men's 90 kg =

Judo competition

Men's 90 kg at the 2014 Asian Games
- Venue: Dowon Gymnasium
- Date: 22 September 2014
- Competitors: 19 from 19 nations

Medalists
gold medal	Yuya Yoshida	Japan
silver medal	Dilshod Choriev	Uzbekistan
bronze medal	Gwak Dong-han	South Korea
bronze medal	Lkhagvasürengiin Otgonbaatar	Mongolia

The men's 90 kilograms (Middleweight) competition at the 2014 Asian Games in Incheon was held on 22 September at the Dowon Gymnasium.

== Schedule ==
All times are Korea Standard Time (UTC+09:00)

Date	Time	Event
Monday, 22 September 2014	14:00	Elimination round of 32
Monday, 22 September 2014	14:00	Elimination round of 16
Monday, 22 September 2014	14:00	Quarterfinals
Monday, 22 September 2014	14:00	Semifinals
Monday, 22 September 2014	14:00	Final of repechage
Monday, 22 September 2014	19:00	Finals

== Results ==
=== Main bracket ===
==== Final ====
Gold medal contest
Dilshod Choriev (UZB)	000
Yuya Yoshida (JPN)	001

==== Top half ====
Elimination round of 32
Mahmoodul Haq Mohammadi (AFG)	000
Awad Naemi (QAT)	102
Horas Manurung (INA)	010
Adnan Khankan (SYR)	000

Elimination round of 16
Gwak Dong-han (KOR)	101
Awad Naemi (QAT)	000
Lkhagvasürengiin Otgonbaatar (MGL)	100
Francois Saade (LIB)	000
Dilshod Choriev (UZB)	100
Ibrahim Khalaf (JOR)	000
Timur Bolat (KAZ)	100
Horas Manurung (INA)	000

Quarterfinals
Gwak Dong-han (KOR)	000
Lkhagvasürengiin Otgonbaatar (MGL)	010
Dilshod Choriev (UZB)	100
Timur Bolat (KAZ)	000

Semifinals
Lkhagvasürengiin Otgonbaatar (MGL)	000
Dilshod Choriev (UZB)	100

==== Bottom half ====
Elimination round of 32
Shree Ram Makaju (NEP)	000
Gabriel Yang (SIN)	100

Elimination round of 16
Yuya Yoshida (JPN)	100
Naif Ammar (KSA)	000
Mohammad Jamali (IRI)	100
Oday Thwaib (PLE)	000
Komronshokh Ustopiriyon (TJK)	101
Batyr Hojamuhammedow (TKM)	000
Cheng Xunzhao (CHN)	100
Gabriel Yang (SIN)	000

Quarterfinals
Yuya Yoshida (JPN)	010
Mohammad Jamali (IRI)	000
Komronshokh Ustopiriyon (TJK)	001
Cheng Xunzhao (CHN)	000

Semifinals
Yuya Yoshida (JPN)	001
Komronshokh Ustopiriyon (TJK)	000

=== Repechage ===
Final of repechage
Gwak Dong-han (KOR)	000
Timur Bolat (KAZ)	000
Mohammad Jamali (IRI)	100
Cheng Xunzhao (CHN)	001

Bronze medal contests
Gwak Dong-han (KOR)	100
Komronshokh Ustopiriyon (TJK)	000
Mohammad Jamali (IRI)	000
Lkhagvasürengiin Otgonbaatar (MGL)	000
