= Avtar Singh (judoka) =

Indian judoka (born 1992)

Personal information
- Born: 3 April 1992 (age 34) Gurdaspur, Punjab, India
- Occupation: Judoka
- Height: 1.93 m (6 ft 4 in)

Sport
- Country: India
- Sport: Judo
- Weight class: ‍–‍90 kg

Achievements and titles
- Olympic Games: R32 (2016)
- World Champ.: R32 (2019, 2024)
- Asian Champ.: 5th (2016)
Medal record
Men's judo
Representing India
South Asian Games
Gold medal – first place	2016 Guwahati	‍–‍90 kg

Profile at external databases
- IJF: 8973
- JudoInside.com: 64816
- Updated on 24 May 2024

Avtar Singh (born 3 April 1992) is an Indian judoka who competed at the 2016 Summer Olympics held in Rio de Janeiro, Brazil.

== Personal life ==
Singh was born on 3 April 1992 in Gurdaspur, Punjab, India. Whilst growing up in Kothe Ghurala village, he spent time working on his parents farm. He works as an assistant sub inspector for the Punjab Police.

== Judo ==
He represented India at the 2014 Commonwealth Games held in Glasgow, Scotland. In the men's middleweight event, he was defeated by eventual silver medallist Matthew Purssey of Scotland in the round of 16.

Singh competed in just six events from 2015 until May 2016, with problems with the Indian Federation and with getting funding preventing him from travelling to tournaments. Before a Grand Prix event in Turkey in 2016, his parents gave him their life savings to allow him to pay for tickets to travel to Turkey, his coach, Yashpal Solanki (Arjuna Awardee) is the major support for him along with his family. At the 2016 South Asian Games held in India, Singh took part in the 90 kg division. He defeated Sanjay Maharjan of Nepal and Md Jahangir Alam of Bangladesh to reach the final where he beat Mohammad Kakar of Afghanistan inside 49 seconds to win the gold medal. At the Asian Judo Championships held in Tashkent, Uzbekistan in April 2016, he reached the semifinals before losing to Tajikistan's Komronshokh Ustopiriyon. He then defeated Saeed Moradi of Iran in the repcharge round before losing his final bout to Chinese judoka Cheng Xunzhao to place fifth overall.

His results in 2016 allowed him to improve his world ranking from below 200th up to 79th, high enough for him to secure one of the Asian continental qualification quota places for the men's 90 kg event at the 2016 Summer Olympics due to be held in Rio de Janeiro, Brazil.

Competing in his first Olympics, held at Rio in 2016, Avtar lost in the first round against Popole Misenga of the Refugee Olympic Team in the Men's 90 kg event. The opponent won the match by the smallest score Yuko.
