= Varlam Liparteliani =

Georgian judoka (born 1989)

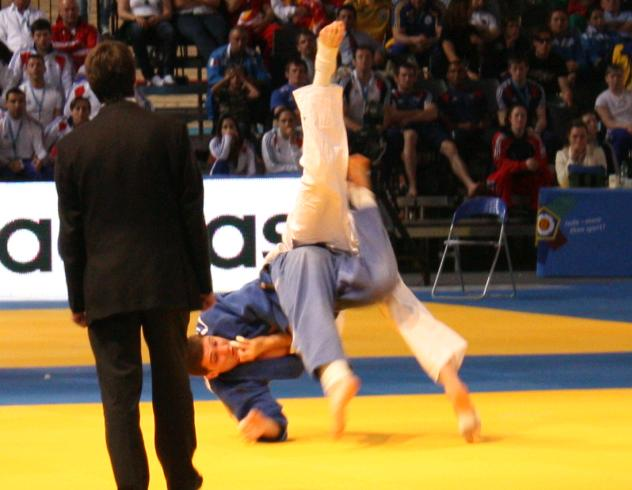
- Varlam Liparteliani (GEO) in the final of the team competition at the 2010 European Judo Championships in Vienna

Personal information
- Nationality: Georgian
- Born: 27 February 1989 (age 37) Lentekhi, Georgian SSR, Soviet Union
- Occupation: Judoka
- Height: 1.87 m (6 ft 2 in)

Sport
- Country: Georgia
- Sport: Judo
- Weight class: ‍–‍100 kg
- Rank: 3rd dan black belt
- Coached by: Giorgi Baindurashvili
- Retired: 24 March 2024

Achievements and titles
- Olympic Games: (silver) (2016)
- World Champ.: (silver) (2013, 2017, 2018)
- European Champ.: (gold) (2012, 2014, 2016)
Medal record
Men's judo
Representing Georgia
Olympic Games
Silver medal – second place	2016 Rio de Janeiro	‍–‍90 kg
World Championships
Silver medal – second place	2013 Rio de Janeiro	‍–‍90 kg
Silver medal – second place	2017 Budapest	‍–‍100 kg
Silver medal – second place	2018 Baku	‍–‍100 kg
Bronze medal – third place	2014 Chelyabinsk	‍–‍90 kg
Bronze medal – third place	2015 Astana	‍–‍90 kg
Bronze medal – third place	2021 Budapest	‍–‍100 kg
European Games
Silver medal – second place	2015 Baku	‍–‍90 kg
Silver medal – second place	2019 Minsk	‍–‍100 kg
European Championships
Gold medal – first place	2012 Chelyabinsk	‍–‍90 kg
Gold medal – first place	2014 Montpellier	‍–‍90 kg
Gold medal – first place	2016 Kazan	‍–‍90 kg
Silver medal – second place	2009 Tbilisi	‍–‍90 kg
Silver medal – second place	2010 Vienna	‍–‍90 kg
Silver medal – second place	2013 Budapest	‍–‍90 kg
Silver medal – second place	2021 Lisbon	‍–‍100 kg
Bronze medal – third place	2011 Istanbul	‍–‍90 kg
World Masters
Gold medal – first place	2017 Saint Petersburg	‍–‍100 kg
Gold medal – first place	2018 Guangzhou	‍–‍100 kg
Gold medal – first place	2021 Doha	‍–‍100 kg
Bronze medal – third place	2013 Tyumen	‍–‍90 kg
Bronze medal – third place	2019 Qingdao	‍–‍100 kg
IJF Grand Slam
Gold medal – first place	2012 Rio de Janeiro	‍–‍90 kg
Gold medal – first place	2013 Paris	‍–‍90 kg
Gold medal – first place	2015 Paris	‍–‍90 kg
Gold medal – first place	2018 Düsseldorf	‍–‍100 kg
Gold medal – first place	2019 Paris	‍–‍100 kg
Gold medal – first place	2023 Tashkent	‍–‍100 kg
Silver medal – second place	2014 Paris	‍–‍90 kg
Silver medal – second place	2020 Paris	‍–‍100 kg
Silver medal – second place	2022 Budapest	‍–‍100 kg
Silver medal – second place	2023 Ulaanbaatar	‍–‍100 kg
Bronze medal – third place	2010 Rio de Janeiro	‍–‍90 kg
Bronze medal – third place	2013 Tokyo	‍–‍90 kg
Bronze medal – third place	2016 Paris	‍–‍90 kg
Bronze medal – third place	2017 Paris	‍–‍100 kg
Bronze medal – third place	2017 Ekaterinburg	‍–‍100 kg
Bronze medal – third place	2018 Paris	‍–‍100 kg
IJF Grand Prix
Gold medal – first place	2011 Abu Dhabi	‍–‍90 kg
Gold medal – first place	2012 Düsseldorf	‍–‍90 kg
Gold medal – first place	2013 Düsseldorf	‍–‍90 kg
Gold medal – first place	2014 Havana	‍–‍90 kg
Gold medal – first place	2015 Düsseldorf	‍–‍90 kg
Silver medal – second place	2010 Rotterdam	‍–‍90 kg
Silver medal – second place	2015 Tbilisi	‍–‍90 kg
Bronze medal – third place	2010 Tunis	‍–‍90 kg
Bronze medal – third place	2017 Zagreb	‍–‍100 kg
World Juniors Championships
Gold medal – first place	2008 Bangkok	‍–‍90 kg
European Junior Championships
Gold medal – first place	2007 Prague	‍–‍90 kg
Gold medal – first place	2008 Warsaw	‍–‍90 kg
European Cadet Championships
Bronze medal – third place	2006 Miskolc	‍–‍81 kg

Profile at external databases
- IJF: 801
- JudoInside.com: 38740
- Updated on 20 February 2025

Varlam Liparteliani (Georgian: ვარლამ ლიპარტელიანი; born 27 February 1989) is a Georgian retired judoka. He has won silver at Olympic and World level.

== Career ==
Liparteliani competed at the 2012 Summer Olympics in the ‍–‍90 kg event and lost in the second round to Mark Anthony. At the European Championships, Liparteliani won gold in 2012, 2014 and 2016, silver in 2009, 2010, 2013, 2015, 2019 and 2021, and bronze in 2011.

Liparteliani was the captain of the National Judo Team for Georgia at the 2016 Summer Olympics. He was coached by Georgi Gugava.

At the 2016 Summer Olympics, Liparteliani won the silver medal. He beat Komronshokh Ustopiriyon, Ovini Uera, Lkhagvasürengiin Otgonbaatar and Gwak Dong-han before losing to Mashu Baker in the final.

Liparteliani's favourite skill is Uchi mata. He ranked No. 1 in the world as of 25 September 2018.

In 2021, Liparteliani won the gold medal in his event at the 2021 World Masters held in Doha, Qatar.

== Personal life ==
Liparteliani began judo aged 11. His inspirations were Japanese legend Kōsei Inoue and fellow Georgian judoka Zurab Zviadauri. He is married and has three sons.

Liparteliani was involved in a car accident with teammate Avtandil Tchrikishvili during a training camp in Borjomi, Georgia, right before the 2012 Olympics. The passengers in the car were heavily injured, but survived.

== Competitive record ==
Judo Record
Total	256
Wins	200
by Ippon	104
Losses	56
by Ippon	18

(as of 25 September 2018)

== Achievements ==
Year	Tournament	Place	Weight class
2014	ECCO Team Challenge	1st	Middleweight (−90 kg)

== Medals ==
2010
(bronze) Grand Prix, Tunis
(bronze) Grand Slam, Rio de Janeiro
(silver) Grand Prix, Rotterdam
2011
(gold) Grand Prix, Abu Dhabi
2012
(gold) Grand Prix, Düsseldorf
(gold) Grand Slam, Rio de Janeiro
2013
(gold) Grand Slam, Paris
(gold) Grand Prix, Düsseldorf
(gold) World Masters, Tyumen
(gold) Grand Slam, Tokyo
2014
(silver) Grand Slam, Paris
(gold) Grand Prix, Havana
2015
(gold) Grand Prix, Düsseldorf
(silver) Grand Prix, Tbilisi
(gold) Grand Slam, Paris
2016
(bronze) Grand Slam, Paris
2017
(bronze) Grand Prix, Zagreb
(bronze) Grand Slam, Paris
(bronze) Grand Prix, Ekaterinburg
(gold) World Masters, St. Petersburg
2018
(bronze) Grand Slam, Paris
(gold) Grand Slam, Düsseldorf
(gold) World Masters, Guangzhou
2019
(gold) Grand Slam, Paris
