= 2014 Judo Grand Slam Paris =

Judo competition

Judo 2014 Judo Grand Slam Paris
- Venue: Accor Arena
- Location: Paris, France
- Dates: 8–9 February 2014
- Competitors: 468 from 75 nations

Competition at external databases
- Links: IJF • EJU • JudoInside

The 2014 Judo Grand Slam Paris was held in Paris, France, from 8 to 9 February 2014.

== Medal summary ==
=== Men's events ===
Event	Gold	Silver	Bronze
Extra-lightweight (−60 kg)	Ganbatyn Boldbaatar (MGL)	Amiran Papinashvili (GEO)	Shinji Kido (JPN)
Extra-lightweight (−60 kg)	Ganbatyn Boldbaatar (MGL)	Amiran Papinashvili (GEO)	Tsai Ming-yen (TPE)
Half-lightweight (−66 kg)	Mikhail Pulyaev (RUS)	Georgii Zantaraia (UKR)	Masaaki Fukuoka (JPN)
Half-lightweight (−66 kg)	Mikhail Pulyaev (RUS)	Georgii Zantaraia (UKR)	Loïc Korval (FRA)
Lightweight (−73 kg)	Bang Gui-man (KOR)	Rok Drakšič (SLO)	Ugo Legrand (FRA)
Lightweight (−73 kg)	Bang Gui-man (KOR)	Rok Drakšič (SLO)	Victor Scvortov (UAE)
Half-middleweight (−81 kg)	Avtandili Tchrikishvili (GEO)	Loïc Pietri (FRA)	Kim Jae-bum (KOR)
Half-middleweight (−81 kg)	Avtandili Tchrikishvili (GEO)	Loïc Pietri (FRA)	Takanori Nagase (JPN)
Middleweight (−90 kg)	Lee Kyu-won (KOR)	Varlam Liparteliani (GEO)	Mashu Baker (JPN)
Middleweight (−90 kg)	Lee Kyu-won (KOR)	Varlam Liparteliani (GEO)	Marc Odenthal (GER)
Half-heavyweight (−100 kg)	Cyrille Maret (FRA)	Lukáš Krpálek (CZE)	Adlan Bisultanov (RUS)
Half-heavyweight (−100 kg)	Cyrille Maret (FRA)	Lukáš Krpálek (CZE)	Henk Grol (NED)
Heavyweight (+100 kg)	Ryu Shichinohe (JPN)	David Moura (BRA)	Faïcel Jaballah (TUN)
Heavyweight (+100 kg)	Ryu Shichinohe (JPN)	David Moura (BRA)	Renat Saidov (RUS)

=== Women's events ===
Event	Gold	Silver	Bronze
Extra-lightweight (−48 kg)	Emi Yamagishi (JPN)	Mönkhbatyn Urantsetseg (MGL)	Amandine Buchard (FRA)
Extra-lightweight (−48 kg)	Emi Yamagishi (JPN)	Mönkhbatyn Urantsetseg (MGL)	Paula Pareto (ARG)
Half-lightweight (−52 kg)	Majlinda Kelmendi (KOS)	Jaana Sundberg (FIN)	Mareen Kräh (GER)
Half-lightweight (−52 kg)	Majlinda Kelmendi (KOS)	Jaana Sundberg (FIN)	Natalia Kuziutina (RUS)
Lightweight (−57 kg)	Anzu Yamamoto (JPN)	Nae Udaka (JPN)	Automne Pavia (FRA)
Lightweight (−57 kg)	Anzu Yamamoto (JPN)	Nae Udaka (JPN)	Rafaela Silva (BRA)
Half-middleweight (−63 kg)	Clarisse Agbegnenou (FRA)	Anne-Laure Bellard (FRA)	Miku Tashiro (JPN)
Half-middleweight (−63 kg)	Clarisse Agbegnenou (FRA)	Anne-Laure Bellard (FRA)	Anicka van Emden (NED)
Middleweight (−70 kg)	Linda Bolder (NED)	Fanny Estelle Posvite (FRA)	Haruka Tachimoto (JPN)
Middleweight (−70 kg)	Linda Bolder (NED)	Fanny Estelle Posvite (FRA)	Kelita Zupancic (CAN)
Half-heavyweight (−78 kg)	Anamari Velenšek (SLO)	Madeleine Malonga (FRA)	Audrey Tcheuméo (FRA)
Half-heavyweight (−78 kg)	Anamari Velenšek (SLO)	Madeleine Malonga (FRA)	Marhinde Verkerk (NED)
Heavyweight (+78 kg)	Kanae Yamabe (JPN)	Émilie Andéol (FRA)	Idalys Ortiz (CUB)
Heavyweight (+78 kg)	Kanae Yamabe (JPN)	Émilie Andéol (FRA)	Lucija Polavder (SLO)

Source Results

=== Medal table ===
* Host nation (France)

Rank	Nation	Gold	Silver	Bronze	Total
1	Japan (JPN)	4	1	6	11
2	France (FRA)*	2	5	5	12
3	South Korea (KOR)	2	0	1	3
4	Georgia (GEO)	1	2	0	3
5	Slovenia (SLO)	1	1	1	3
6	Mongolia (MGL)	1	1	0	2
7	Netherlands (NED)	1	0	3	4
7	Russia (RUS)	1	0	3	4
9	Kosovo (KOS)	1	0	0	1
10	Brazil (BRA)	0	1	1	2
11	Czech Republic (CZE)	0	1	0	1
11	Finland (FIN)	0	1	0	1
11	Ukraine (UKR)	0	1	0	1
14	Germany (GER)	0	0	2	2
15	Argentina (ARG)	0	0	1	1
15	Canada (CAN)	0	0	1	1
15	Chinese Taipei (TPE)	0	0	1	1
15	Cuba (CUB)	0	0	1	1
15	Tunisia (TUN)	0	0	1	1
15	United Arab Emirates (UAE)	0	0	1	1
Totals (20 entries)		14	14	28	56
