= Judo at the 2018 Asian Games – Men's 90 kg =

Judo competition

Men's 90 kg at the 2018 Asian Games
- Venue: Jakarta Convention Center
- Date: 31 August 2018
- Competitors: 17 from 17 nations

Medalists
gold medal	Gwak Dong-han	South Korea
silver medal	Gantulgyn Altanbagana	Mongolia
bronze medal	Komronshokh Ustopiriyon	Tajikistan
bronze medal	Mashu Baker	Japan

The men's 90 kilograms (Middleweight) competition at the 2018 Asian Games in Jakarta was held on 31 August at the Jakarta Convention Center Assembly Hall.

== Schedule ==
All times are Western Indonesia Time (UTC+07:00)

Date	Time	Event
Friday, 31 August 2018	09:00	Elimination round of 32
Friday, 31 August 2018	09:00	Elimination round of 16
Friday, 31 August 2018	09:00	Quarterfinals
Friday, 31 August 2018	09:00	Repechage
Friday, 31 August 2018	09:00	Semifinals
Friday, 31 August 2018	16:00	Finals

== Results ==
=== Main bracket ===
==== Final ====
Gold medal contest
Gwak Dong-han (KOR)	10
Gantulgyn Altanbagana (MGL)	00

==== Top half ====
Elimination round of 32
Qaisar Khan (PAK)	00
Shen Chao-en (TPE)	01

Elimination round of 16
Gwak Dong-han (KOR)	11
Shen Chao-en (TPE)	00
Tejen Tejenow (TKM)	10
Horas Manurung (INA)	00
Islam Bozbayev (KAZ)	01
Kittipong Hantratin (THA)	00
Mashu Baker (JPN)	10
Faruch Bulekulov (KGZ)	00

Quarterfinals
Gwak Dong-han (KOR)	11
Tejen Tejenow (TKM)	00
Islam Bozbayev (KAZ)	00
Mashu Baker (JPN)	10

Semifinals
Gwak Dong-han (KOR)	10
Mashu Baker (JPN)	00

==== Bottom half ====
Elimination round of 32

Elimination round of 16
Komronshokh Ustopiriyon (TJK)	11
Shree Ram Makaju (NEP)	00
Nacif Elias (LBN)	01
Bu Hebilige (CHN)	00
Gantulgyn Altanbagana (MGL)	10
Mohammad Ismail Kakar (AFG)	00
Shakhzodbek Sabirov (UZB)	10
Sergiu Toma (UAE)	00

Quarterfinals
Komronshokh Ustopiriyon (TJK)	10
Nacif Elias (LBN)	00
Gantulgyn Altanbagana (MGL)	01
Shakhzodbek Sabirov (UZB)	00

Semifinals
Komronshokh Ustopiriyon (TJK)	01
Gantulgyn Altanbagana (MGL)	11

=== Repechage ===
Repechage
Tejen Tejenow (TKM)	00
Islam Bozbayev (KAZ)	10
Nacif Elias (LBN)	00
Shakhzodbek Sabirov (UZB)	01

Bronze medal contests
Islam Bozbayev (KAZ)	00
Komronshokh Ustopiriyon (TJK)	01
Shakhzodbek Sabirov (UZB)	00
Mashu Baker (JPN)	10
