= Iszlam Monier Suliman =

Hungarian judoka

Personal information
- Nationality: Hungarian/Sudanese
- Born: 17 December 1990 (age 35) Miskolc, Hungary

Sport
- Sport: Judo

Iszlam Monier Suliman (born 17 December 1990) is a Hungarian Sudanese judoka, born in Miskolc.

== Career ==
He competed at the 2016 Summer Olympics in Rio de Janeiro, in the men's 90 kg where he was defeated by Colton Brown in the second round.
