= Shakhzodbek Sabirov =

Uzbekistani judoka (born 1993)

Personal information
- Born: 29 May 1993 (age 33)
- Occupation: Judoka

Sport
- Country: Uzbekistan
- Sport: Judo
- Weight class: ‍–‍81 kg, ‍–‍90 kg

Achievements and titles
- Olympic Games: R16 (2016)
- World Champ.: R16 (2014)
- Asian Champ.: 5th (2017, 2018)
Medal record
Men's judo
Representing Uzbekistan
IJF Grand Slam
Gold medal – first place	2015 Paris	‍–‍81 kg
IJF Grand Prix
Bronze medal – third place	2014 Tashkent	‍–‍81 kg
Bronze medal – third place	2017 Tbilisi	‍–‍90 kg
Asian Junior Championships
Gold medal – first place	2011 Beirut	‍–‍73 kg
Bronze medal – third place	2012 Taipei	‍–‍81 kg
Bronze medal – third place	2013 Hainan	‍–‍81 kg

Profile at external databases
- IJF: 12499
- JudoInside.com: 41949
- Updated on 24 November 2022

Shakhzodbek Sabirov (born 29 May 1993) is an Uzbekistani judoka. He competed at the 2016 Summer Olympics in the men's 81 kg event, in which he was eliminated by Travis Stevens in the third round.
