= 2015 Judo Grand Slam Paris =

Judo competition

Judo 2015 Judo Grand Slam Paris
- Venue: AccorHotels Arena, Paris
- Location: Paris, France
- Dates: 17–18 October 2015
- Competitors: 435 from 84 nations

Competition at external databases
- Links: IJF • EJU • JudoInside

The 2015 Judo Grand Slam Paris was held in Paris, France, from 17 to 18 October 2015.

== Medal summary ==
=== Men's events ===
Event	Gold	Silver	Bronze
Extra-lightweight (−60 kg)	Naohisa Takato (JPN)	Vincent Limare (FRA)	Sharafuddin Lutfillaev (UZB)
Extra-lightweight (−60 kg)	Naohisa Takato (JPN)	Vincent Limare (FRA)	Dashdavaagiin Amartüvshin (MGL)
Half-lightweight (−66 kg)	Davaadorjiin Tömörkhüleg (MGL)	Georgii Zantaraia (UKR)	Dovdony Altansükh (MGL)
Half-lightweight (−66 kg)	Davaadorjiin Tömörkhüleg (MGL)	Georgii Zantaraia (UKR)	Tomofumi Takajo (JPN)
Lightweight (−73 kg)	Hiroyuki Akimoto (JPN)	Rustam Orujov (AZE)	Igor Wandtke (GER)
Lightweight (−73 kg)	Hiroyuki Akimoto (JPN)	Rustam Orujov (AZE)	Sagi Muki (ISR)
Half-middleweight (−81 kg)	Shakhzodbek Sabirov (UZB)	Sergey Ryabov (RUS)	Otgonbaataryn Uuganbaatar (MGL)
Half-middleweight (−81 kg)	Shakhzodbek Sabirov (UZB)	Sergey Ryabov (RUS)	Frank de Wit (NED)
Middleweight (−90 kg)	Varlam Liparteliani (GEO)	Alexandre Iddir (FRA)	Célio Dias (POR)
Middleweight (−90 kg)	Varlam Liparteliani (GEO)	Alexandre Iddir (FRA)	Lkhagvasürengiin Otgonbaatar (MGL)
Half-heavyweight (−100 kg)	Cyrille Maret (FRA)	Rafael Buzacarini (BRA)	Lukáš Krpálek (CZE)
Half-heavyweight (−100 kg)	Cyrille Maret (FRA)	Rafael Buzacarini (BRA)	Michael Korrel (NED)
Heavyweight (+100 kg)	Hisayoshi Harasawa (JPN)	David Moura (BRA)	Takeshi Ōjitani (JPN)
Heavyweight (+100 kg)	Hisayoshi Harasawa (JPN)	David Moura (BRA)	Roy Meyer (NED)

=== Women's events ===
Event	Gold	Silver	Bronze
Extra-lightweight (−48 kg)	Mönkhbatyn Urantsetseg (MGL)	Charline Van Snick (BEL)	Julia Figueroa (ESP)
Extra-lightweight (−48 kg)	Mönkhbatyn Urantsetseg (MGL)	Charline Van Snick (BEL)	Shira Rishony (ISR)
Half-lightweight (−52 kg)	Majlinda Kelmendi (KOS)	Evelyne Tschopp (SUI)	Ai Shishime (JPN)
Half-lightweight (−52 kg)	Majlinda Kelmendi (KOS)	Evelyne Tschopp (SUI)	Priscilla Gneto (FRA)
Lightweight (−57 kg)	Telma Monteiro (POR)	Dorjsürengiin Sumiyaa (MGL)	Nae Udaka (JPN)
Lightweight (−57 kg)	Telma Monteiro (POR)	Dorjsürengiin Sumiyaa (MGL)	Sabrina Filzmoser (AUT)
Half-middleweight (−63 kg)	Tina Trstenjak (SLO)	Juul Franssen (NED)	Martyna Trajdos (GER)
Half-middleweight (−63 kg)	Tina Trstenjak (SLO)	Juul Franssen (NED)	Yarden Gerbi (ISR)
Middleweight (−70 kg)	Haruka Tachimoto (JPN)	Laura Vargas Koch (GER)	Kim Polling (NED)
Middleweight (−70 kg)	Haruka Tachimoto (JPN)	Laura Vargas Koch (GER)	Margaux Pinot (FRA)
Half-heavyweight (−78 kg)	Audrey Tcheuméo (FRA)	Ruika Sato (JPN)	Akari Ogata (JPN)
Half-heavyweight (−78 kg)	Audrey Tcheuméo (FRA)	Ruika Sato (JPN)	Madeleine Malonga (FRA)
Heavyweight (+78 kg)	Émilie Andéol (FRA)	Franziska Konitz (GER)	Larisa Cerić (BIH)
Heavyweight (+78 kg)	Émilie Andéol (FRA)	Franziska Konitz (GER)	Iryna Kindzerska (UKR)

Source Results

=== Medal table ===
* Host nation (France)

Rank	Nation	Gold	Silver	Bronze	Total
1	Japan (JPN)	4	1	5	10
2	France (FRA)*	3	2	3	8
3	Mongolia (MGL)	2	1	4	7
4	Portugal (POR)	1	0	1	2
4	Uzbekistan (UZB)	1	0	1	2
6	Georgia (GEO)	1	0	0	1
6	Kosovo (KOS)	1	0	0	1
6	Slovenia (SLO)	1	0	0	1
9	Germany (GER)	0	2	2	4
10	Brazil (BRA)	0	2	0	2
11	Netherlands (NED)	0	1	4	5
12	Ukraine (UKR)	0	1	1	2
13	Azerbaijan (AZE)	0	1	0	1
13	Belgium (BEL)	0	1	0	1
13	Russia (RUS)	0	1	0	1
13	Switzerland (SUI)	0	1	0	1
17	Israel (ISR)	0	0	3	3
18	Austria (AUT)	0	0	1	1
18	Bosnia and Herzegovina (BIH)	0	0	1	1
18	Czech Republic (CZE)	0	0	1	1
18	Spain (ESP)	0	0	1	1
Totals (21 entries)		14	14	28	56
