= Marc Odenthal =

German judoka (born 1991)

Personal information
- Born: 25 January 1991 (age 35)
- Occupation: Judoka
- Height: 180 cm (5 ft 11 in)
- Weight: 94 kg (207 lb)

Sport
- Country: Germany
- Sport: Judo
- Weight class: ‍–‍90 kg

Achievements and titles
- Olympic Games: R32 (2016)
- World Champ.: R16 (2013)
- European Champ.: 5th (2013)
Medal record
Men's judo
Representing Germany
European Championships
| Gold medal – first place | 2018 Yekaterinburg | Mixed team |
IJF Grand Slam
| Bronze medal – third place | 2014 Paris | ‍–‍90 kg |
IJF Grand Prix
| Gold medal – first place | 2015 Tashkent | ‍–‍90 kg |
| Silver medal – second place | 2014 Samsun | ‍–‍90 kg |
| Silver medal – second place | 2018 Cancún | ‍–‍90 kg |
| Bronze medal – third place | 2013 Qingdao | ‍–‍90 kg |
European U23 Championships
| Bronze medal – third place | 2011 Tyumen | ‍–‍90 kg |
European Cadet Championships
| Silver medal – second place | 2006 Miskolc | ‍–‍73 kg |

Profile at external databases
- IJF: 3525
- JudoInside.com: 40393
- Updated on 27 November 2022

Marc Odenthal (born 25 January 1991) is a German judoka. He competed at the 2016 Summer Olympics in Rio de Janeiro, in the men's 90 kg. He was defeated by Mashu Baker of Japan in the round of 32.
