= Judo at the 2016 Summer Olympics – Men's 90 kg =

Judo competition

Men's 90 kg at the Games of the XXXI Olympiad
- Venue: Carioca Arena 2
- Date: 10 August 2016
- Competitors: 35 from 35 nations

Medalists
1st place, gold medalist(s)		Mashu Baker	Japan
2nd place, silver medalist(s)		Varlam Liparteliani	Georgia
3rd place, bronze medalist(s)		Gwak Dong-han	South Korea
3rd place, bronze medalist(s)		Cheng Xunzhao	China

The men's 90 kg competition in judo at the 2016 Summer Olympics in Rio de Janeiro was held on 10 August at the Carioca Arena 2.

The gold and silver medals were determined by a single-elimination tournament, with the winner of the final taking gold and the loser receiving silver. Judo events awarded two bronze medals. Quarterfinal losers competed in a repechage match for the right to face a semifinal loser for a bronze medal (that is, the judokas defeated in quarterfinals A and B competed against each other, with the winner of that match facing the semifinal loser from the other half of the bracket).

The medals for the competition were presented by Sari Essayah, Finland, member of the International Olympic Committee, and the gifts were presented by Obaid Al Anzi, vice president of the International Judo Federation.

== Results ==
=== Finals ===
Semi-finals
Mashu Baker (JPN)	100
Cheng Xunzhao (CHN)	000
Gwak Dong-han (KOR)	000
Varlam Liparteliani (GEO)	100

Final
Mashu Baker (JPN)	001
Varlam Liparteliani (GEO)	000

=== Repechages ===
Repechage		Bronze medal
Alexandre Iddir (FRA)	000
Marcus Nyman (SWE)	100	Gwak Dong-han (KOR)	100
		Marcus Nyman (SWE)	000

Repechage		Bronze medal
Mammadali Mehdiyev (AZE)	000
Lkhagvasürengiin Otgonbaatar (MGL)	001	Cheng Xunzhao (CHN)	001
		Lkhagvasürengiin Otgonbaatar (MGL)	000

=== Pool A ===
First round

Second round
Mashu Baker (JPN)	100
Marc Odenthal (GER)	000
Mihael Žgank (SLO)	000
Aleksandar Kukolj (SRB)	100
Alexandre Iddir (FRA)	000
Ciril Grossklaus (SUI)	000
Colton Brown (USA)	100
Iszlam Monier Suliman (SUD)	000

Third round
Mashu Baker (JPN)	100
Aleksandar Kukolj (SRB)	000
Alexandre Iddir (FRA)	010
Colton Brown (USA)	000

Quarterfinals
Mashu Baker (JPN)	100
Alexandre Iddir (FRA)	000

=== Pool B ===
First round
Sherali Juraev (UZB)	000
Abderahmane Benamadi (ALG)	000

Second round
Krisztián Tóth (HUN)	100
Kiplangat Sang (KEN)	000
Ilias Iliadis (GRE)	000
Cheng Xunzhao (CHN)	100
Marcus Nyman (SWE)	101
Sherali Juraev (UZB)	001
Celtus Dossou Yovo (BEN)	100
Célio Dias (POR)	001

Third round
Krisztián Tóth (HUN)	000
Cheng Xunzhao (CHN)	100
Marcus Nyman (SWE)	100
Celtus Dossou Yovo (BEN)	000

Quarterfinals
Cheng Xunzhao (CHN)	100
Marcus Nyman (SWE)	000

=== Pool C ===
First round
Ibrahim Khalaf (JOR)	000
Thomas Briceño (CHI)	011

Second round
Gwak Dong-han (KOR)	100
Thomas Briceño (CHI)	000
Avtar Singh (IND)	000
Popole Misenga (ROT)	001
Kirill Denisov (RUS)	000
Mammadali Mehdiyev (AZE)	100
Zack Piontek (RSA)	000
Tiago Camilo (BRA)	101

Third round
Gwak Dong-han (KOR)	100
Popole Misenga (ROT)	000
Mammadali Mehdiyev (AZE)	011
Tiago Camilo (BRA)	001

Quarterfinals
Gwak Dong-han (KOR)	100
Mammadali Mehdiyev (AZE)	000

=== Pool D ===
First round
Martín Michel (BOL)	000
Asley González (CUB)	110

Second round
Varlam Liparteliani (GEO)	100
Komronshokh Ustopiriyon (TJK)	000
Ovini Uera (NRU)	100
Renick James (BIZ)	000
Noël van 't End (NED)	000
Lkhagvasürengiin Otgonbaatar (MGL)	100
Asley González (CUB)	101
Quedjau Nhabali (UKR)	000

Third round
Varlam Liparteliani (GEO)	100
Ovini Uera (NRU)	000
Lkhagvasürengiin Otgonbaatar (MGL)	100
Asley González (CUB)	000

Quarterfinals
Varlam Liparteliani (GEO)	000
Lkhagvasürengiin Otgonbaatar (MGL)	000
