= Renick James =

Belizean judoka

Personal information
- Nationality: Belizean
- Born: 21 August 1987 (age 38)
- Height: 1.8 m (5 ft 11 in)
- Weight: 91 kg (201 lb)

Sport
- Sport: Judo

Renick James (born 21 August 1987) is a Belizean judoka.

He competed at the 2016 Summer Olympics in Rio de Janeiro, in the men's 90 kg, where he was defeated by Ovini Uera in the second round.
