= Alexandr Jurečka =

Czech judoka (1990–2015)

Personal information
- Born: 18 December 1990 Havířov, Czechoslovakia
- Died: 25 September 2015 (aged 24) Lake Garda, Italy
- Occupation: Judoka

Sport
- Country: Czech Republic
- Sport: Judo
- Weight class: ‍–‍90 kg
- Club: JC Havířov

Achievements and titles
- World Champ.: R16 (2013, 2015)
- European Champ.: R16 (2012, 2013)
Medal record
Men's judo
Representing Czech Republic
IJF Grand Slam
Bronze medal – third place	2013 Baku	‍–‍90 kg
Bronze medal – third place	2013 Moscow	‍–‍90 kg
IJF Grand Prix
Bronze medal – third place	2013 Samsun	‍–‍90 kg
Summer Universiade
Bronze medal – third place	2013 Kazan	‍–‍90 kg

Profile at external databases
- IJF: 1322
- JudoInside.com: 42028
- Updated on 27 November 2022

Alexandr Jurečka (18 December 1990 – 25 September 2015) was a judoka from the Czech Republic.

== Sports career ==
=== 2008–2012 ===
In 2012 Jurečka represented the Czech Republic at the European Judo Championships in Chelyabinsk, Russia.

=== Death ===
Jurečka died on 25 September 2015 while scuba diving with friends in Lake Garda, Italy. Divers from Trento found Jurečka's body after searching for him in 80 metres (260 ft) of water. The probable cause of Jurečka's death was a technical defect in his equipment.
