= Martín Michel (judoka) =

Bolivian judoka

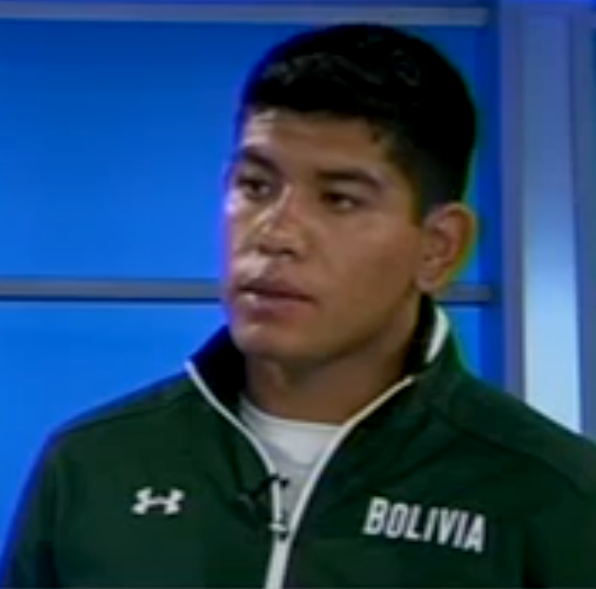
- In a 2016 interview

Personal information
- Nationality: Bolivian
- Born: 5 September 1994 (age 31)

Sport
- Sport: Judo

Martín Michel (born 5 September 1994) is a Bolivian judoka.

He competed at the 2016 Summer Olympics in Rio de Janeiro, in the men's 90 kg. He was defeated by Asley González in the first round.
