= Beka Gviniashvili =

Georgian judoka (born 1995)

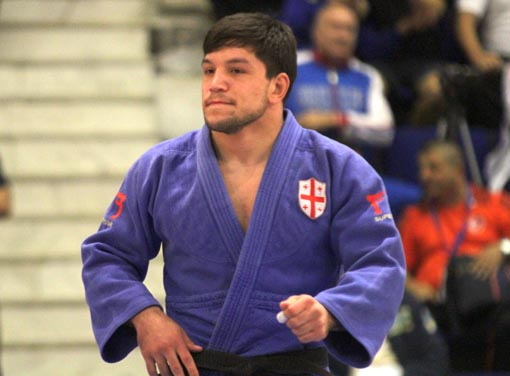

Personal information
- Born: 26 October 1995 (age 30) Georgia
- Occupation: Judoka
- Height: 1.80 m (5 ft 11 in)

Sport
- Country: Georgia
- Sport: Judo
- Weight class: ‍–‍90 kg

Achievements and titles
- Olympic Games: 7th (2016)
- World Champ.: 5th (2015)
- European Champ.: (silver) (2021)
Medal record
Men's judo
Representing Georgia
World Championships
Bronze medal – third place	2015 Astana	Men's team
European Games
Gold medal – first place	2023 Kraków	Mixed team
Silver medal – second place	2015 Baku	Men's team
European Championships
Gold medal – first place	2017 Warsaw	Men's team
Silver medal – second place	2021 Lisbon	‍–‍90 kg
Bronze medal – third place	2017 Warsaw	‍–‍90 kg
Bronze medal – third place	2020 Prague	‍–‍90 kg
World Masters
Gold medal – first place	2015 Rabat	‍–‍90 kg
Gold medal – first place	2017 Saint Petersburg	‍–‍90 kg
Silver medal – second place	2021 Doha	‍–‍90 kg
IJF Grand Slam
Gold medal – first place	2016 Baku	‍–‍100 kg
Gold medal – first place	2019 Osaka	‍–‍90 kg
Gold medal – first place	2022 Tbilisi	‍–‍90 kg
Gold medal – first place	2022 Abu Dhabi	‍–‍90 kg
Gold medal – first place	2023 Tel Aviv	‍–‍90 kg
Silver medal – second place	2017 Abu Dhabi	‍–‍90 kg
Silver medal – second place	2018 Paris	‍–‍90 kg
Silver medal – second place	2019 Ekaterinburg	‍–‍90 kg
Bronze medal – third place	2014 Baku	‍–‍90 kg
Bronze medal – third place	2020 Düsseldorf	‍–‍90 kg
Bronze medal – third place	2021 Tel Aviv	‍–‍90 kg
Bronze medal – third place	2021 Baku	‍–‍90 kg
Bronze medal – third place	2022 Budapest	‍–‍90 kg
IJF Grand Prix
Gold medal – first place	2014 Samsun	‍–‍90 kg
Gold medal – first place	2014 Ulaanbaatar	‍–‍90 kg
Gold medal – first place	2015 Tbilisi	‍–‍90 kg
Gold medal – first place	2016 Samsun	‍–‍100 kg
Gold medal – first place	2017 Düsseldorf	‍–‍90 kg
Gold medal – first place	2019 Zagreb	‍–‍90 kg
Gold medal – first place	2022 Zagreb	‍–‍90 kg
Bronze medal – third place	2014 Havana	‍–‍90 kg
Bronze medal – third place	2015 Düsseldorf	‍–‍90 kg
Bronze medal – third place	2016 Tbilisi	‍–‍100 kg
Bronze medal – third place	2019 Tbilisi	‍–‍90 kg
Bronze medal – third place	2019 Budapest	‍–‍90 kg
European U23 Championships
Gold medal – first place	2016 Tel Aviv	‍–‍90 kg
World Juniors Championships
Gold medal – first place	2013 Ljubljana	‍–‍90 kg
Gold medal – first place	2015 Abu Dhabi	‍–‍90 kg
Bronze medal – third place	2011 Cape Town	‍–‍81 kg
Bronze medal – third place	2014 Fort Lauderdale	‍–‍90 kg
European Junior Championships
Gold medal – first place	2013 Sarajevo	‍–‍90 kg
Gold medal – first place	2014 Bucharest	‍–‍90 kg
Gold medal – first place	2015 Oberwart	‍–‍90 kg
Silver medal – second place	2012 Poreč	‍–‍81 kg
World Cadets Championships
Gold medal – first place	2011 Kyiv	‍–‍81 kg
European Cadet Championships
Gold medal – first place	2011 Cottonera	‍–‍81 kg
European Youth Olympic Festival
Gold medal – first place	2011 Trabzon	‍–‍81 kg

Profile at external databases
- IJF: 8167
- JudoInside.com: 75560
- Updated on 1 July 2023

Beka Gviniashvili (born 26 October 1995) is a Georgian judoka who became European Junior Champion in 2013, 2014, and 2015 and won the World Junior Championships in 2013 in Ljubljana and in 2015 in Abu Dhabi and EYOF in 2011. He also became the U23 European Championship in 2016 in Tel Aviv. With the Georgian Juniors, he won the World and European titles. He is a promising rising judoka. He placed 5th at the 2015 World Judo Championships in Astana, Kazakhstan after losing in the bronze medal final against one of his colleagues Varlam Liparteliani. He competed at the 2016 Summer Olympics in Rio de Janeiro, in the men's ‍–‍100 kg category where he placed 7th. He took bronze at the 2017 European Judo Championships in the men's ‍–‍90 kg category.

In 2021, Gviniashvili won the silver medal in his event at the 2021 Judo World Masters held in Doha, Qatar.

On 22 May 2025, Gviniashvili received a four-year suspension.

== Mixed martial arts record ==
Professional record breakdown
3 matches	3 wins	0 losses
By knockout	1	0
By submission	1	0
By decision	1	0

Res.	Record	Opponent	Method	Event	Date	Round	Time	Location	Notes
Win	3–0	Luis Paulo Picanço	Decision (unanimous)	Rkena FC 3	May 16, 2026	3	5:00	Tbilisi, Georgia	Catchweight (192 lb) bout.
Win	2–0	Taipan Cristi	Submission (kimura)	Integra FC 23	April 4, 2026	1	0:42	Tbilisi, Georgia	
Win	1–0	Veselin Dimitrov	TKO (punches)	Integra FC 22	December 6, 2025	1	0:38	Wittlich, Germany	Middleweight debut.
