= Gwak Dong-han =

South Korean judoka (born 1992)

- Gwak in 2020

Personal information
- Native name: 곽동한
- Nationality: South Korean
- Born: 20 April 1992 (age 34) Pohang, South Korea
- Home town: Seoul, South Korea
- Education: Yongin University
- Occupation: Judoka
- Height: 182 cm (6 ft 0 in)
- Weight: 92 kg (203 lb)

Sport
- Country: South Korea
- Sport: Judo
- Weight class: –90 kg
- Rank: 4th dan black belt
- Team: South Korea National Team; High1 Resort
- Coached by: Song Dae-nam; Choi Min-ho; Kim Geon-woo

Achievements and titles
- Olympic Games: (bronze) (2016)
- World Champ.: (gold) (2015)
- Asian Champ.: (gold) (2015, 2018)
Medal record
Men's judo
Representing South Korea
Olympic Games
Bronze medal – third place	2016 Rio de Janeiro	‍–‍90 kg
World Championships
Gold medal – first place	2015 Astana	‍–‍90 kg
Bronze medal – third place	2017 Budapest	‍–‍90 kg
Asian Games
Gold medal – first place	2014 Incheon	Men's team
Gold medal – first place	2018 Jakarta	‍–‍90 kg
Bronze medal – third place	2014 Incheon	‍–‍90 kg
Asian Championships
Gold medal – first place	2015 Kuwait City	‍–‍90 kg
Silver medal – second place	2013 Bangkok	‍–‍90 kg
Bronze medal – third place	2021 Bishkek	‍–‍90 kg
World Masters
Silver medal – second place	2017 Saint Petersburg	‍–‍90 kg
IJF Grand Slam
Gold medal – first place	2014 Tokyo	‍–‍90 kg
Gold medal – first place	2019 Paris	‍–‍90 kg
Silver medal – second place	2019 Abu Dhabi	‍–‍90 kg
Bronze medal – third place	2015 Tokyo	‍–‍90 kg
Bronze medal – third place	2016 Paris	‍–‍90 kg
Bronze medal – third place	2017 Paris	‍–‍90 kg
Bronze medal – third place	2019 Osaka	‍–‍90 kg
IJF Grand Prix
Gold medal – first place	2013 Jeju	‍–‍90 kg
Gold medal – first place	2014 Jeju	‍–‍90 kg
Gold medal – first place	2015 Jeju	‍–‍90 kg
Gold medal – first place	2018 Hohhot	‍–‍90 kg
Gold medal – first place	2020 Tel Aviv	‍–‍90 kg
Summer Universiade
Gold medal – first place	2013 Kazan	‍–‍90 kg
Gold medal – first place	2015 Gwangju	‍–‍90 kg
Gold medal – first place	2017 Taipei	‍–‍90 kg
Silver medal – second place	2013 Kazan	Men's team

Profile at external databases
- IJF: 10038
- JudoInside.com: 31222
- Updated on 21 May 2023

Gwak Dong-han (Korean: 곽동한; Korean pronunciation: [kwak̚.t͈oŋ.ɦan]; born 20 April 1992) is a South Korean judoka. He won the gold medal in the 90 kg event at the 2015 World Judo Championships. He is currently ranked No. 1 in the world (as of 8 February 2016).

He was his coach's Song Dae-nam's training partner at the 2012 Summer Olympics.

== Career ==
=== 2011 World Cup Suwon ===
Gwak participated in his first senior tournament at home ground at the World Cup in Suwon. He lost in his first fight against Russia's Victor Semenov by ippon, waza-ari and yuko.

=== 2012 World Cup Ulaanbatar ===
Gwak won his first IJF circuit title at the World Cup in Ulaanbaatar. He defeated Mongolia's Bat-erdene Davaadorj in the final by ippon.

=== 2012 Grand Slam Tokyo ===
Gwak's first outing to a Grand Slam ended in his first fight. He was defeated by Japan's Yuya Yoshida by ippon in golden score. The fight lasted for over seven minutes.

=== 2012 World Cup Jeju ===
Gwak reached the final of the World Cup in Jeju, where he narrowly won by decision and yuko in the quarter-final and semi-final. He eventually lost against Japan's Kensei Ikeda by waza-ari, and settled for silver.

=== 2013 Grand Prix Dusseldorf ===
Gwak lost in his second fight to European champion Varlam Liparteliani by ippon.

=== 2013 Asian Championships ===
Gwak played ippon judo en route to the final of his first continental tournament, but lost by shido to Japan's Shohei Shimowada, settling for silver.

=== 2013 World Championships ===
Gwak participated in his first World Championships in Rio de Janeiro. He lost in his third fight to eventual world champion Asley González by ippon.

=== 2013 Grand Slam Tokyo ===
Gwak's second outing to Tokyo was again stunted in his first fight, losing to two-time world silver medalist Daiki Nishiyama.

=== 2013 Grand Prix Jeju ===
Gwak won his second IJF circuit title at the Grand Prix in Jeju, causing an upset by defeating legend Ilias Iliadis by ippon with uchi mata.

=== 2014 Grand Slam Paris ===
Gwak competed in his first Paris Grand Slam and finished fifth, losing to future rival Mashu Baker by ippon and waza-ari.

=== 2014 Asian Championships ===
Gwak lost in the quarter-final to Mongolia's Otgonbataar Lkhagvasuren by waza-ari, but won in the repechage against Kazakhstan's Timur Bolat. He won bronze after defeating Tajikistan's Komronshokh Ustopiriyon by ippon.

=== 2014 Grand Prix Jeju ===
Gwak successfully defended his title by winning against Azerbaijan's Mammadali Mehdiyev by ippon and waza-ari in the final.

=== 2014 Grand Slam Tokyo ===
Gwak won in his third outing to the Grand Slam in Tokyo, defeating three Japanese judokas consecutively. He beat Baker in the quarter-final by waza-ari and yuko, Kenta Nagasawa in the semi-final by shido, and Nishiyama in the final by yuko.

=== 2015 Grand Prix Dusseldorf ===
Gwak finished fifth in his second outing to the Grand Prix in Düsseldorf, losing to rival Nishiyama in the bronze medal contest by waza-ari.

=== 2015 European Open Warsaw ===
Gwak participated in his first European Open in Warsaw, and won the tournament by defeating all his opponents by ippon. He faced Lithuania's Karolis Bauza in the final, who was the only one to gain a score against Gwak, but was ultimately defeated.

=== 2015 Asian Championships ===
Gwak won his first continental title in Kuwait City, making it his second tournament to win all fights by ippon. He defeated long time rival Nishiyama in the final, using his signature skill seoi nage for ippon.

=== 2015 World Championships ===
Gwak had a breakthrough in his career at the World Championships in Astana. He continued playing ippon judo in his first two fights, however narrowly won by yuko until the semi-final. He defeated Russia's Kirill Denisov in the final by waza-ari, becoming one of South Korea's two world champions in the tournament.

In the team competition, Korea was up against Mongolia in the semi-final. Korea had already sealed the deal by winning the first three fights. Gwak was defeated by Otgonbataar by ippon. Otgonbataar used Gwak's main skill seoi nage against him for a consolation win. According to the IJF commentators, Gwak had no intention of fighting to his maximum to save energy for the final. Korea won 4–1 for a gold medal contest against Japan.

In the final, Gwak was against Yoshida. Japan was up by a point, making it a must-win for Gwak. He narrowly won by shido. Korea ended up settling for silver, losing 3–2.

=== 2015 Grand Prix Tashkent ===
Gwak surprisingly finished seventh at his first outing as world champion. After winning by ippon against Mihail Marchitan, he lost the quarter-final against Dmitri Gerasimenko and was defeated in the repechage by Karolis Bauza, both by ippon.

=== 2015 Grand Prix Jeju ===
Gwak won his third consecutive Grand Prix in Jeju, narrowly beating the experienced Magomed Magomedov and Iliadis by shido. He defeated France's Axel Clerget for a waza-ari and yuko, winning the gold medal.

=== 2015 Grand Slam Tokyo ===
Gwak failed to defend his title at Tokyo, but managed to win bronze. He defeated rival Nishiyama in the quarter-final by shido, however lost to Nishiyama's teammate Baker in the semi-final by ippon in golden score. He won the bronze medal by defeating Russia's Kirill Voprosov by ippon.

=== 2016 Grand Slam Paris ===
Gwak competed in his second Paris Grand Slam, and was the heavy favorite with the absence of Baker. He faced long-time rival and eventual winner Nishiyama in the quarter-final, and lost by yuko. He won the repechage against Eduardo Bettoni and won the bronze medal by defeating Ciril Grossklaus by waza-ari.

=== 2016 Grand Prix Dusseldorf ===
Gwak continued his medal-less streak in Düsseldorf when he lost to Sweden's Marcus Nyman in the semi-final by a single yuko. He was set to face fellow countryman Kim Jae-yun, however did not fight due to injury, leaving him to finish fifth place.

=== 2016 Olympic Games ===
Regardless of the rankings, I think judokas at the Olympics have the same level of skills.

— Gwak on coming into the Olympics as World Champion

"I feel a little pressure about not winning the gold medal and not showing all of my skills, but I won't forget the basics and my original goal as an athlete." – Gwak on his aim at the Olympics

"I'm using and learning his techniques.. his matches four years ago inspired me to go for the Olympic gold medal. ...I renewed my commitment to take the winner’s podium [when] I saw my senior colleagues (Kim Jae-bum and Song) win the gold.” – Gwak on his coach Song's influence and desire to defend the Olympic title for Korea

== Fighting style ==
"My forte is that I have... good shoulder throw techniques. I don't have an aggressive style. I usually focus on defense and attack the opponents in the latter part of the match."

— Gwak on his fighting style

“Since Gwak started judo from a light weight class, he is very skilled in precision techniques. ...He has transformed into a world-class athlete by gaining weight and increasing muscular strength. The tendency of Gwak to maintain composure, no matter the circumstances, has developed into one of his strengths.” – Kim Geon-woo, Gwak's coach at High1 Resort, on his calm and tactical style

== Competitive record ==
Judo Record
Total	77
Wins	62
by Ippon	24
Losses	15
by Ippon	8

(as of 19 February 2016)
