= Colton Brown =

American judoka (born 1991)

Personal information
- Born: October 8, 1991 (age 34) New Brunswick, New Jersey, U.S.
- Home town: Piscataway, New Jersey, U.S.
- Occupation: Judoka
- Height: 6 ft 0 in (183 cm)

Sport
- Country: United States
- Sport: Judo
- Weight class: ‍–‍90 kg

Achievements and titles
- Olympic Games: R16 (2016, 2020)
- World Champ.: R16 (2019)
- Pan American Champ.: (2016, 2017)
Medal record
Men's judo
Representing United States
Pan American Championships
| Silver medal – second place | 2016 Havana | ‍–‍90 kg |
| Silver medal – second place | 2017 Panama City | ‍–‍90 kg |
| Bronze medal – third place | 2018 San José | ‍–‍90 kg |
| Bronze medal – third place | 2020 Guadalajara | ‍–‍90 kg |
IJF Grand Prix
| Silver medal – second place | 2019 Montreal | ‍–‍90 kg |
| Bronze medal – third place | 2013 Miami | ‍–‍90 kg |
Pan American Junior Championships
| Gold medal – first place | 2010 Buena Vista | ‍–‍90 kg |

Profile at external databases
- IJF: 1518
- JudoInside.com: 57925
- Updated on November 29, 2022

Colton Brown (born October 8, 1991) is an American judoka.

Brown competed in the men's 90 kg event at the 2016 Summer Olympics in Rio de Janeiro. Brown stated that the Olympic selection was a "dream come true" and that "It felt as though a lifetime of work was finally paying off.". He competed at the 2020 Summer Olympics again in the men's 90 kg event, where he was the only American man in the judo competitions. He was eliminated in the round of 16 by Mihael Žgank of Turkey.

== Early career ==
Colton Brown begun his career in judo at the age of 17. His father was a judoka and Brown would go with his father to practice.
