= Lkhagvasürengiin Otgonbaatar =

Mongolian judoka (born 1993)

Lkhagvasuren Otgonbaatar
Personal information
- Native name: Лхагвасүрэнгийн Отгонбаатар
- Born: 20 January 1993 (age 33) Battsengel, Mongolia
- Occupation: Judoka
- Height: 1.82 m (6 ft 0 in)

Sport
- Country: Mongolia
- Sport: Judo
- Weight class: ‍–‍100 kg

Achievements and titles
- Olympic Games: 5th (2016)
- World Champ.: (bronze) (2018)
- Asian Champ.: (gold) (2019)
- National finals: (gold) (2016, 2018)
Medal record
Men's judo
Representing Mongolia
World Championships
Bronze medal – third place	2018 Baku	‍–‍100 kg
Bronze medal – third place	2015 Astana	Men's team
Asian Games
Bronze medal – third place	2014 Incheon	‍–‍90 kg
Bronze medal – third place	2018 Jakarta	‍–‍100 kg
Asian Championships
Gold medal – first place	2019 Fujairah	‍–‍100 kg
World Masters
Silver medal – second place	2018 Guangzhou	‍–‍100 kg
IJF Grand Slam
Gold medal – first place	2015 Abu Dhabi	‍–‍90 kg
Bronze medal – third place	2015 Paris	‍–‍90 kg
IJF Grand Prix
Gold medal – first place	2015 Ulaanbaatar	‍–‍90 kg
Gold medal – first place	2016 Ulaanbaatar	‍–‍90 kg
Bronze medal – third place	2013 Ulaanbaatar	‍–‍90 kg
Bronze medal – third place	2015 Tbilisi	‍–‍90 kg
Bronze medal – third place	2016 Düsseldorf	‍–‍90 kg
Bronze medal – third place	2018 Antalya	‍–‍100 kg
Bronze medal – third place	2019 Hohhot	‍–‍100 kg

Profile at external databases
- IJF: 9649
- JudoInside.com: 58477
- Updated on 23 May 2023

Lkhagvasürengiin Otgonbaatar (Mongolian: Лхагвасүрэнгийн Отгонбаатар; born 20 January 1993) is a Mongolian judoka. He represented his country at the 2016 Summer Olympics and participated at the 2018 World Judo Championships, winning a bronze medal. He won the gold medal at the 2019 Asian Judo Championships.
