= Celtus Dossou Yovo =

Beninese judoka

Personal information
- Born: 1 April 1986 (age 40) Cotonou, Benin
- Occupation: Judoka

Sport
- Sport: Judo
- Weight class: –90 kg

Profile at external databases
- IJF: 22303
- JudoInside.com: 97329
- Updated on 3 November 2021

Celtus Dossou Yovo (born 1 April 1986 in Cotonou) is a Beninese judoka.

He competed at the 2016 Summer Olympics in Rio de Janeiro, in the men's 90 kg, where he defeated Célio Dias in the second round but lost to Marcus Nyman in the third round.

He competed at the 2020 Summer Olympics in the men's 90kg. He lost to Russia's Mikhail Igolnikov in the second round.
