= Ovini Uera =

Nauruan judoka

Personal information
- Nationality: Nauruan
- Born: 18 January 1988 (age 38)
- Height: 1.7 m (5 ft 7 in)
- Weight: 90 kg (200 lb)

Sport
- Country: Nauru
- Sport: Judo

Ovini Uera (born 18 January 1988) is a Nauruan judoka.

== Preparation ==
Uera, who was a catering manager and worked for Nauru Airlines, had a daily routine that started with a warm up at 6am, and practiced at a gym with no walls, and had rain falling through the roof. Sled Dowabobo was his coach and physiotherapist. Uera raised funds from barbecues and door knocking. He studied YouTube videos of Varlam Liparteliani.

== Career ==
He competed at the 2016 Summer Olympics in Rio de Janeiro, in the men's 90 kg where he defeated Renick James in the second round but lost to Varlam Liparteliani in the third round. He was the flag bearer for Nauru during the closing ceremony.
