= Ibrahim Khalaf =

Jordanian judoka

Personal information
- Nationality: Jordanian
- Born: 9 July 1986 (age 39)
- Occupation: Judoka

Sport
- Sport: Judo

Profile at external databases
- JudoInside.com: 39904

Ibrahim Khalaf (born 9 July 1986) is a Jordanian judoka.

He competed at the 2016 Summer Olympics in Rio de Janeiro, in the men's 90 kg.
