= Cheng Xunzhao =

Chinese judoka (born 1991)

Personal information
- Born: 9 February 1991 (age 35) Feng County, Jiangsu
- Occupation: Judoka
- Height: 1.85 m (6 ft 1 in)

Sport
- Country: China
- Sport: Judo
- Weight class: ‍–‍90 kg
- Rank: 1st dan black belt
- Coached by: Chung Hoon; Liu Y.

Achievements and titles
- Olympic Games: (bronze) (2016)
- World Champ.: R32 (2015)
- Asian Champ.: (bronze) (2016)
Medal record
Men's judo
Representing China
Olympic Games
Bronze medal – third place	2016 Rio de Janeiro	‍–‍90 kg
Asian Championships
Bronze medal – third place	2016 Tashkent	‍–‍90 kg
IJF Grand Slam
Gold medal – first place	2017 Paris	‍–‍90 kg
IJF Grand Prix
Gold medal – first place	2012 Qingdao	‍–‍90 kg
Silver medal – second place	2015 Ulaanbaatar	‍–‍90 kg
Silver medal – second place	2016 Almaty	‍–‍90 kg

Profile at external databases
- IJF: 3940
- JudoInside.com: 61727
- Updated on 24 May 2023

Cheng Xunzhao (born 9 February 1991) is a Chinese judoka. He represented his country at the 2016 Summer Olympics.
