= Célio Dias =

Portuguese judoka (born 1993)

Personal information
- Born: 8 February 1993 (age 33)
- Occupation: Judoka

Sport
- Country: Portugal
- Sport: Judo
- Weight class: ‍–‍90 kg

Achievements and titles
- Olympic Games: R32 (2016)
- World Champ.: 7th (2013)
- European Champ.: 7th (2013)
Medal record
Men's judo
Representing Portugal
IJF Grand Slam
Bronze medal – third place	2015 Paris	‍–‍90 kg
IJF Grand Prix
Gold medal – first place	2015 Budapest	‍–‍90 kg
Bronze medal – third place	2016 Tbilisi	‍–‍90 kg
Bronze medal – third place	2016 Budapest	‍–‍90 kg

Profile at external databases
- IJF: 9394
- JudoInside.com: 56987
- Updated on 24 November 2022

Célio Dias (born 8 February 1993) is a Portuguese judoka.

Dias competed at the 2016 Summer Olympics in Rio de Janeiro, in the men's 90 kg.
