= Mashu Baker =

Japanese judoka (born 1994)

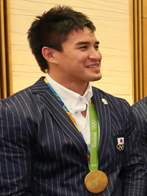

Personal information
- Native name: ベイカー 茉秋
- Nationality: Japanese
- Born: 25 September 1994 (age 31) Tokyo, Japan
- Home town: Tokyo, Japan
- Education: Tokai University
- Occupation: Judoka
- Height: 178 cm (5 ft 10 in)

Sport
- Country: Japan
- Sport: Judo
- Weight class: –90 kg
- Club: JFA Judo Club
- Team: All Japan National Team
- Coached by: Mitushi Hirokawa; Kosei Inoue

Achievements and titles
- Olympic Games: (gold) (2016)
- World Champ.: (bronze) (2015)
- Asian Champ.: (bronze) (2018)
Medal record
Men's judo
Representing Japan
Olympic Games
Gold medal – first place	2016 Rio de Janeiro	‍–‍90 kg
World Championships
Bronze medal – third place	2015 Astana	‍–‍90 kg
Asian Games
Gold medal – first place	2018 Jakarta	Mixed Team
Bronze medal – third place	2018 Jakarta	‍–‍90 kg
World Masters
Gold medal – first place	2016 Guadalajara	‍–‍90 kg
IJF Grand Slam
Gold medal – first place	2013 Tokyo	‍–‍90 kg
Gold medal – first place	2015 Baku	‍–‍90 kg
Gold medal – first place	2015 Tyumen	‍–‍90 kg
Gold medal – first place	2015 Tokyo	‍–‍90 kg
Silver medal – second place	2018 Düsseldorf	‍–‍90 kg
Bronze medal – third place	2014 Paris	‍–‍90 kg
Bronze medal – third place	2014 Tokyo	‍–‍90 kg
IJF Grand Prix
Gold medal – first place	2019 Montreal	‍–‍90 kg
Bronze medal – third place	2019 Tashkent	‍–‍90 kg

Profile at external databases
- IJF: 15143
- JudoInside.com: 13805
- Updated on 24 May 2023

Matthew Baker (ベイカー 茉秋 Beikā Mashū, Japanese surname: 小林, born 25 September 1994 in Tokyo), is a male Japanese judoka.

His father is an American. His parents divorced when he was little and was raised by his mother.

He started judo at the age of 7. His favorite technique is Ouchi Gari. In 2015, he won the bronze medal in the Middleweight (90 kg) division at the 2015 World Judo Championships. He is currently ranked No. 38 in the world (as of 2019). He won the gold medal in under 90 kg division in 2016 Rio Olympics.

== Competitive record ==
Judo record
Total	36
Wins	32
by Ippon	18
Losses	4
by Ippon	1

(as of 4 December 2015)
