= Komronshokh Ustopiriyon =

Tajikistani judoka (born 1993)

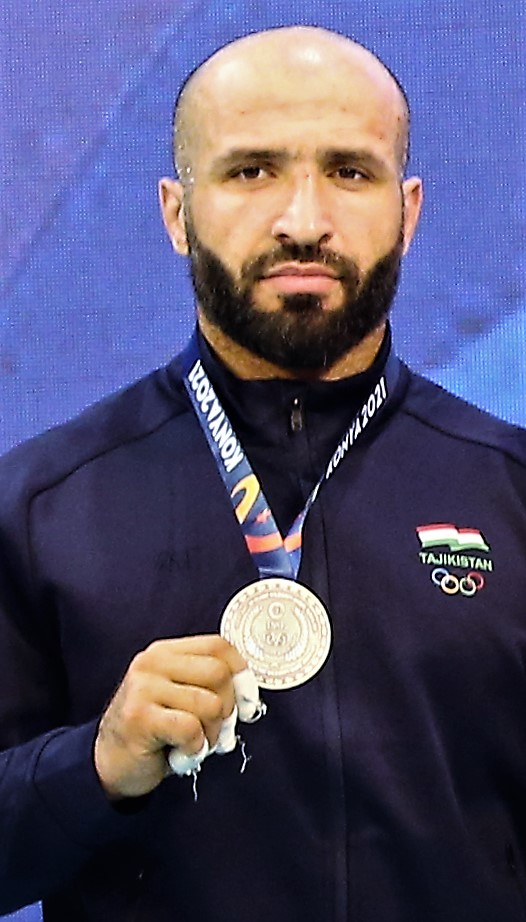

Personal information
- Nationality: Tajikistani
- Born: 7 January 1993 (age 33) Mastchoh, Tajikistan
- Occupation: Judoka
- Height: 1.82 m (6 ft 0 in)

Sport
- Country: Tajikistan
- Sport: Judo
- Weight class: –90 kg
- Club: Ustopiriyon Judo Club

Achievements and titles
- Olympic Games: R32 (2016, 2020, 2024)
- World Champ.: 5th (2015)
- Asian Champ.: (gold) (2016, 2017)
Medal record
Men's judo
Representing Tajikistan
Asian Games
Bronze medal – third place	2018 Jakarta	‍–‍90 kg
Asian Championships
Gold medal – first place	2016 Tashkent	‍–‍90 kg
Gold medal – first place	2017 Hong Kong	‍–‍90 kg
Silver medal – second place	2019 Fujairah	‍–‍90 kg
Bronze medal – third place	2015 Kuwait City	‍–‍90 kg
Bronze medal – third place	2021 Bishkek	‍–‍90 kg
IJF Grand Slam
Silver medal – second place	2021 Abu Dhabi	‍–‍90 kg
IJF Grand Prix
Gold medal – first place	2014 Astana	‍–‍90 kg
Gold medal – first place	2017 Tashkent	‍–‍90 kg
Gold medal – first place	2018 Antalya	‍–‍90 kg
Gold medal – first place	2023 Dushanbe	‍–‍90 kg
Silver medal – second place	2015 Tashkent	‍–‍90 kg
Silver medal – second place	2017 Antalya	‍–‍90 kg
Bronze medal – third place	2013 Almaty	‍–‍90 kg
Bronze medal – third place	2013 Tashkent	‍–‍90 kg
Bronze medal – third place	2019 Antalya	‍–‍90 kg
Bronze medal – third place	2022 Almada	‍–‍90 kg
Islamic Solidarity Games
Silver medal – second place	2021 Konya	‍–‍90 kg
Asian Junior Championships
Bronze medal – third place	2012 Taipei	‍–‍90 kg

Profile at external databases
- IJF: 10855
- JudoInside.com: 86569
- Updated on 31 July 2024

Komronshokh Ustopiriyon (born 7 January 1993) is a Tajikistani judoka.

Ustopiriyon competed at the 2016 Summer Olympics in Rio de Janeiro, in the men's 90 kg.
