= Judo at the 2016 Summer Olympics =

Judo Judo at the Games of the XXXI Olympiad
- Venue: Carioca Arena 2
- Location: Rio de Janeiro, Brazil
- Dates: 6–12 August 2016
- No. of events: 14
- Competitors: 386 from 138 nations

Competition at external databases
- Links: IJF • EJU • JudoInside

Judo at the 2016 Summer Olympics in Rio de Janeiro took place from 6 to 12 August at the Carioca Arena 2 inside the Barra Olympic Park in Barra da Tijuca. Around 386 judoka competed in 14 events (seven each for both men and women).

== Qualification ==
Similar to the 2012 format, qualification was based on the world ranking list prepared by International Judo Federation as of May 30, 2016. A total of 252 athletes directly qualified through the ranking with only the top 22 men or top 14 women in each division, ensuring that each National Olympic Committee was subjected to a limit of one judoka per division.

== Competition schedule ==
There were two sessions of competition on each day of the 2016 Olympic Judo program. The first session (Elimination & Quarterfinal) was conducted from 10:00 to 13:00 BRT, and the second session (repechage, semifinal, bronze medal and gold medal) was conducted from 15:30 to 18:10 BRT.

Q	Elimination & Quarterfinal	F	Repechage, Semifinal, Bronze medal & Gold medal

Event↓/Date →	Sat 6		Sun 7		Mon 8		Tue 9		Wed 10		Thu 11		Fri 12	
Men's
Men's 60 kg	Q	F												
Men's 66 kg			Q	F										
Men's 73 kg					Q	F								
Men's 81 kg							Q	F						
Men's 90 kg									Q	F				
Men's 100 kg											Q	F		
Men's +100 kg													Q	F
Women's
Women's 48 kg	Q	F												
Women's 52 kg			Q	F										
Women's 57 kg					Q	F								
Women's 63 kg							Q	F						
Women's 70 kg									Q	F				
Women's 78 kg											Q	F		
Women's +78 kg													Q	F

== Participating ==
=== Participating nations ===
- Afghanistan (1)
- Andorra (1)
- Algeria (5)
- American Samoa (1)
- Angola (1)
- Argentina (2)
- Armenia (1)
- Aruba (1)
- Australia (7)
- Austria (5)
- Azerbaijan (6)
- Belarus (2)
- Belgium (5)
- Belize (1)
- Benin (1)
- Bolivia (1)
- Bosnia and Herzegovina (1)
- Brazil (14)
- Bulgaria (2)
- Burkina Faso (1)
- Burundi (1)
- Cameroon (1)
- Canada (8)
- Chile (1)
- China (8)
- Chinese Taipei (2)
- Colombia (2)
- Republic of the Congo (1)
- Costa Rica (1)
- Croatia (1)
- Cuba (9)
- Czech Republic (3)
- Dominican Republic (1)
- Democratic Republic of the Congo (1)
- Djibouti (1)
- Ecuador (3)
- Egypt (5)
- El Salvador (1)
- Estonia (1)
- Fiji (1)
- Finland (1)
- France (14)
- Gabon (2)
- The Gambia (1)
- Georgia (8)
- Germany (13)
- Ghana (1)
- Great Britain (7)
- Greece (2)
- Guatemala (1)
- Guinea-Bissau (1)
- Haiti (1)
- Honduras (1)
- Hungary (8)
- Iceland (1)
- India (1)
- Iran (2)
- Iraq (1)
- Israel (7)
- Italy (6)
- Ivory Coast (1)
- Japan (14)
- Jordan (1)
- Kazakhstan (5)
- Kenya (1)
- Kosovo (2)
- Kyrgyzstan (2)
- Laos (1)
- Latvia (2)
- Lebanon (1)
- Libya (1)
- Lithuania (1)
- Macedonia (1)
- Madagascar (1)
- Mali (1)
- Mauritius (1)
- Mexico (2)
- Moldova (1)
- Monaco (1)
- Mongolia (13)
- Montenegro (1)
- Morocco (3)
- Mozambique (1)
- Nauru (1)
- Nepal (1)
- Netherlands (11)
- New Zealand (1)
- Niger (1)
- North Korea (3)
- Pakistan (1)
- Palestine (1)
- Papua New Guinea (1)
- Peru (1)
- Philippines (1)
- Poland (4)
- Portugal (6)
- Puerto Rico (2)
- Qatar (1)
- Refugee Olympic Team (2)
- Romania (4)
- Russia (11)
- Samoa (1)
- San Marino (1)
- Saudi Arabia (1)
- Senegal (1)
- Serbia (1)
- Seychelles (1)
- Slovenia (5)
- South Africa (1)
- South Korea (12)
- Spain (5)
- Sri Lanka (1)
- Sudan (1)
- Suriname (1)
- Sweden (4)
- Switzerland (3)
- Syria (1)
- Tajikistan (2)
- Tanzania (1)
- Thailand (1)
- Trinidad and Tobago (1)
- Tunisia (4)
- Turkey (4)
- Turkmenistan (2)
- Ukraine (7)
- United Arab Emirates (3)
- United States (6)
- Uruguay (1)
- Uzbekistan (7)
- Vanuatu (1)
- Venezuela (1)
- Vietnam (1)
- Yemen (1)
- Zambia (1)

=== Competitors ===
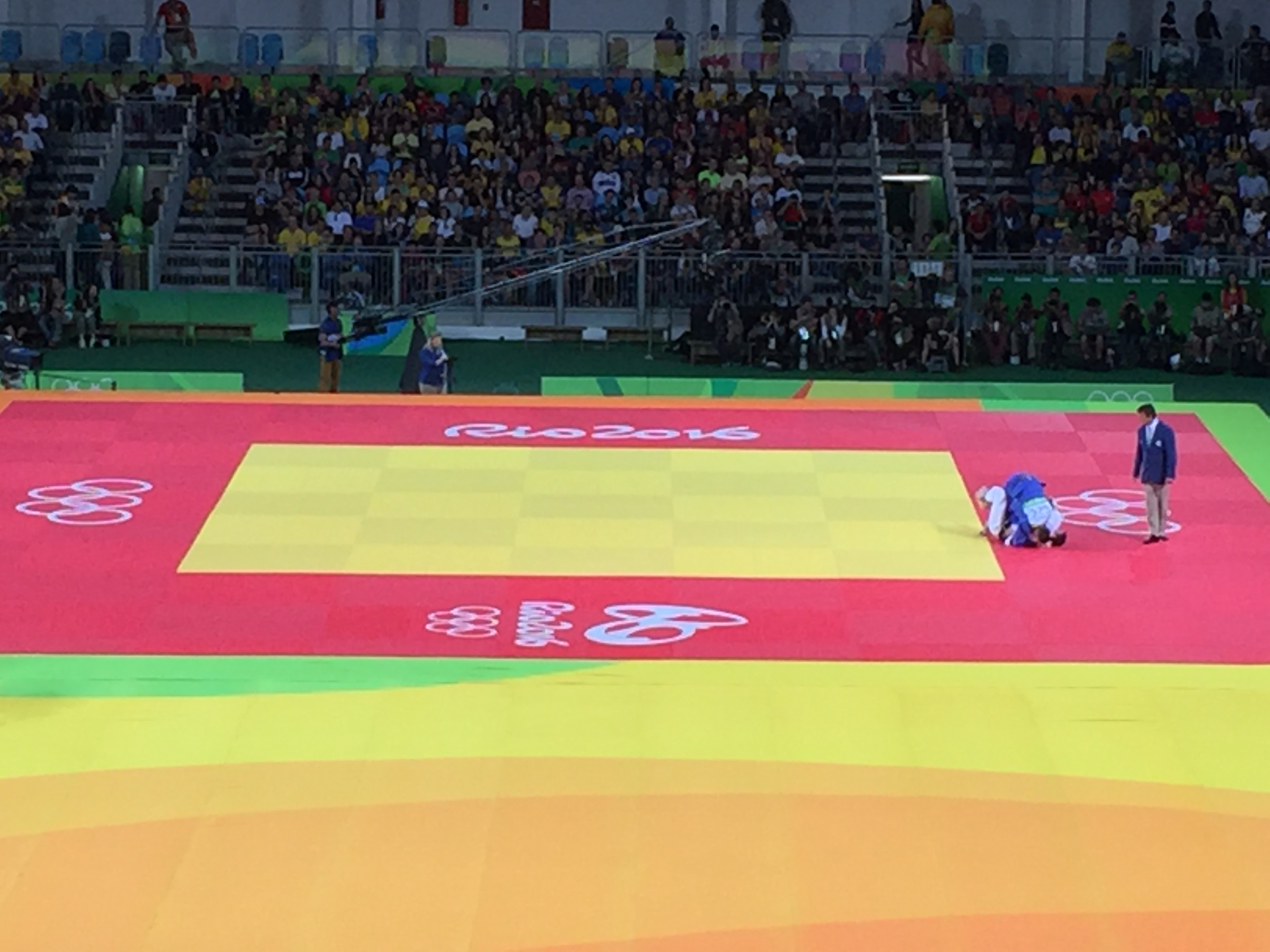
2016 Summer Olympics Judo

== Medal summary ==
=== Medal table ===
* Host nation (Brazil)

Rank	Nation	Gold	Silver	Bronze	Total
1	Japan	3	1	8	12
2	France	2	2	1	5
3	Russia	2	0	1	3
4	Italy	1	1	0	2
4	United States	1	1	0	2
6	Brazil*	1	0	2	3
7	Slovenia	1	0	1	2
8	Argentina	1	0	0	1
8	Czech Republic	1	0	0	1
8	Kosovo	1	0	0	1
11	South Korea	0	2	1	3
12	Azerbaijan	0	2	0	2
13	Georgia	0	1	1	2
13	Kazakhstan	0	1	1	2
15	Colombia	0	1	0	1
15	Cuba	0	1	0	1
15	Mongolia	0	1	0	1
18	China	0	0	2	2
18	Israel	0	0	2	2
18	Uzbekistan	0	0	2	2
21	Belgium	0	0	1	1
21	Germany	0	0	1	1
21	Great Britain	0	0	1	1
21	Netherlands	0	0	1	1
21	Portugal	0	0	1	1
21	United Arab Emirates	0	0	1	1
Totals (26 entries)		14	14	28	56

=== Men's events ===
Games	Gold	Silver	Bronze
Extra-lightweight (60 kg)	Beslan Mudranov; Russia	Yeldos Smetov; Kazakhstan	Naohisa Takato; Japan
Extra-lightweight (60 kg)	Beslan Mudranov; Russia	Yeldos Smetov; Kazakhstan	Diyorbek Urozboev; Uzbekistan
Half-lightweight (66 kg)	Fabio Basile; Italy	An Ba-ul; South Korea	Rishod Sobirov; Uzbekistan
Half-lightweight (66 kg)	Fabio Basile; Italy	An Ba-ul; South Korea	Masashi Ebinuma; Japan
Lightweight (73 kg)	Shohei Ono; Japan	Rustam Orujov; Azerbaijan	Lasha Shavdatuashvili; Georgia
Lightweight (73 kg)	Shohei Ono; Japan	Rustam Orujov; Azerbaijan	Dirk Van Tichelt; Belgium
Half-middleweight (81 kg)	Khasan Khalmurzaev; Russia	Travis Stevens; United States	Sergiu Toma; United Arab Emirates
Half-middleweight (81 kg)	Khasan Khalmurzaev; Russia	Travis Stevens; United States	Takanori Nagase; Japan
Middleweight (90 kg)	Mashu Baker; Japan	Varlam Liparteliani; Georgia	Gwak Dong-han; South Korea
Middleweight (90 kg)	Mashu Baker; Japan	Varlam Liparteliani; Georgia	Cheng Xunzhao; China
Half-heavyweight (100 kg)	Lukáš Krpálek; Czech Republic	Elmar Gasimov; Azerbaijan	Cyrille Maret; France
Half-heavyweight (100 kg)	Lukáš Krpálek; Czech Republic	Elmar Gasimov; Azerbaijan	Ryunosuke Haga; Japan
Heavyweight (+100 kg)	Teddy Riner; France	Hisayoshi Harasawa; Japan	Rafael Silva; Brazil
Heavyweight (+100 kg)	Teddy Riner; France	Hisayoshi Harasawa; Japan	Or Sasson; Israel

=== Women's events ===
Games	Gold	Silver	Bronze
Extra-lightweight (48 kg)	Paula Pareto; Argentina	Jeong Bo-kyeong; South Korea	Ami Kondo; Japan
Extra-lightweight (48 kg)	Paula Pareto; Argentina	Jeong Bo-kyeong; South Korea	Galbadrakhyn Otgontsetseg; Kazakhstan
Half-lightweight (52 kg)	Majlinda Kelmendi; Kosovo	Odette Giuffrida; Italy	Misato Nakamura; Japan
Half-lightweight (52 kg)	Majlinda Kelmendi; Kosovo	Odette Giuffrida; Italy	Natalia Kuziutina; Russia
Lightweight (57 kg)	Rafaela Silva; Brazil	Dorjsürengiin Sumiyaa; Mongolia	Telma Monteiro; Portugal
Lightweight (57 kg)	Rafaela Silva; Brazil	Dorjsürengiin Sumiyaa; Mongolia	Kaori Matsumoto; Japan
Half-middleweight (63 kg)	Tina Trstenjak; Slovenia	Clarisse Agbegnenou; France	Yarden Gerbi; Israel
Half-middleweight (63 kg)	Tina Trstenjak; Slovenia	Clarisse Agbegnenou; France	Anicka van Emden; Netherlands
Middleweight (70 kg)	Haruka Tachimoto; Japan	Yuri Alvear; Colombia	Sally Conway; Great Britain
Middleweight (70 kg)	Haruka Tachimoto; Japan	Yuri Alvear; Colombia	Laura Vargas Koch; Germany
Half-heavyweight (78 kg)	Kayla Harrison; United States	Audrey Tcheuméo; France	Mayra Aguiar; Brazil
Half-heavyweight (78 kg)	Kayla Harrison; United States	Audrey Tcheuméo; France	Anamari Velenšek; Slovenia
Heavyweight (+78 kg)	Émilie Andéol; France	Idalys Ortiz; Cuba	Kanae Yamabe; Japan
Heavyweight (+78 kg)	Émilie Andéol; France	Idalys Ortiz; Cuba	Yu Song; China

== See also ==
- Judo at the 2016 Summer Paralympics
