= List of flag bearers for the United Arab Emirates at the Olympics =

United Arab Emirates at the Olympics
- Flag of the United Arab Emirates
- IOC code: UAE
- NOC: United Arab Emirates National Olympic Committee
- Website: www.uaenoc.ae (in Arabic and English)
- Medals: Gold 1 Silver 0 Bronze 1 Total 2

Summer appearances
- 1984; 1988; 1992; 1996; 2000; 2004; 2008; 2012; 2016; 2020; 2024

This is a list of flag bearers who have represented United Arab Emirates at the Olympics.

Flag bearers carry the national flag of their country at the opening ceremony of the Olympic Games.

#	Event year	Season	Flag bearer	Sport
1	1984	Summer	Mubarak Ismail Amber	Athletics
2	1988	Summer	Sultan Khalifa	Cycling
3	1992	Summer		
4	1996	Summer	Nabil Abdul Tahlak	Shooting
5	2000	Summer	Saeed Al-Maktoum	Shooting
6	2004	Summer	Saeed Al-Maktoum	Shooting
7	2008	Summer	Maitha Al-Maktoum	Taekwondo
8	2012	Summer	Saeed Al-Maktoum	Shooting
9	2016	Summer	Nada Al-Bedwawi	Swimming
10	2020	Summer	Yousuf Al-Matrooshi	Swimming
11	2024	Summer	Omar Al Marzouqi	Equestrian
11	2024	Summer	Safia Al-Sayegh	Cycling

== See also ==
- United Arab Emirates at the Olympics
