= United Arab Emirates at the 2025 World Aquatics Championships =

- Flag of the United Arab Emirates
- World Aquatics code: UAE
- National federation: UAE Swimming Federation
- Website: uaeswimming.com

in Singapore
- Competitors: 2 in 1 sport
- Medals: Gold 0 Silver 0 Bronze 0 Total 0

World Aquatics Championships appearances
- 1994; 1998; 2001; 2003; 2005; 2007; 2009; 2011; 2013; 2015; 2017; 2019; 2022; 2023; 2024; 2025

United Arab Emirates competed at the 2025 World Aquatics Championships in Singapore from July 11 to August 3, 2025.

== Competitors ==
The following is the list of competitors in the Championships.

Sport	Men	Women	Total
Swimming	2	0	2
Total	2	0	2

== Swimming ==
United Arab Emirates entered 2 swimmers.

Men

Athlete	Event	Heat		Semi-final		Final	
Athlete	Event	Time	Rank	Time	Rank	Time	Rank
Yousuf Al-Matrooshi	50 m freestyle	23.77	64	Did not advance			
Yousuf Al-Matrooshi	100 m freestyle	50.98	54	Did not advance			
Salem Sabt	50 m butterfly	26.25	76	Did not advance			
Salem Sabt	100 m butterfly	58.10	67	Did not advance			
