= United Arab Emirates at the 1992 Summer Olympics =

- Flag of the United Arab Emirates
- IOC code: UAE
- NOC: United Arab Emirates National Olympic Committee

in Barcelona
- Competitors: 13 in 3 sports
- Medals: Gold 0 Silver 0 Bronze 0 Total 0

Summer Olympics appearances (overview)
- 1984; 1988; 1992; 1996; 2000; 2004; 2008; 2012; 2016; 2020; 2024

The United Arab Emirates competed at the 1992 Summer Olympics in Barcelona, Spain. Thirteen competitors, all men, took part in nineteen events in three sports.

== Competitors ==
The following is the list of number of competitors in the Games.

Sport	Men	Women	Total
Athletics	4	0	4
Cycling	4	0	4
Swimming	5	0	5
Total	13	0	13

== Athletics ==
Men's 400m Hurdles

- Abdulla Sabt

- Heat – 56.20 (→ did not advance)

Men's 800m

- Mohamed Salem Al-Tunaiji (Note: Mohamed Rached Salem Al-Tunaiji (Arabic: محمد راشد سالم الطنيجي; born 6 October 1969), seeded in the first 800m heat, finished 7th with a time of 1:53.91 and failed to advance. He later went on to set the Emirati national record in the 800m with a time of 1:50.70 in 1994.)

- Heat – 1:53.91 (→ did not advance)

== Cycling ==
Four cyclists represented the United Arab Emirates in 1992.

Men's road race

- Ali Al-Abed
- Mansoor Bu Osaiba
- Khalifa Bin Omair

Men's team time trial

- Ali Al-Abed
- Mansoor Bu Osaiba
- Khamis Harib
- Khalifa Bin Omair

== Swimming ==
Men

Athlete	Event	Heats		Final A/B	
Athlete	Event	Time	Rank	Time	Rank
Mohamed Bin Abid	50 metre freestyle	25.79	62	Did not advance	
Mohamed Bin Abid	100 metre freestyle	56.82	70	Did not advance	
Mohamed Bin Abid	100 metre breaststroke	1:15.12	57	Did not advance	
Mohamed Bin Abid	200 metre individual medley	2:22.95	49	Did not advance	
Ahmad Faraj	50 metre freestyle	25.91	64	Did not advance	
Ahmad Faraj	100 metre freestyle	56.05	66	Did not advance	
Ahmad Faraj	200 metre freestyle	2:07.61	53	Did not advance	
Obaid Al-Rumaithi	100 metre breaststroke	1:12.77	52	Did not advance	
Obaid Al-Rumaithi	200 metre breaststroke	2:44.61	51	Did not advance	
Abdullah Sultan	100 metre backstroke	1:08.22	52	Did not advance	
Abdullah Sultan	200 metre backstroke	DSQ	–	Did not advance	
Mohamed Khamis	100 metre butterfly	1:01.72	66	Did not advance	
Mohamed Khamis	200 metre butterfly	2:29.73	46	Did not advance	
Ahmad Faraj; Obaid Al-Rumaithi; Abdullah Sultan; Mohamed Bin Abid	4 × 100 m freestyle relay	3:51.60	18	Did not advance	
Mohamed Bin Abid; Obaid Al-Rumaithi; Abdullah Sultan; Ahmad Faraj	4 × 200 m freestyle relay	8:39.72	18	Did not advance	
Mohamed Bin Abid; Obaid Al-Rumaithi; Mohamed Khamis; Ahmad Faraj	4 × 100 m medley relay	4:21.03	23	Did not advance	
