= United Arab Emirates at the 2008 Summer Olympics =

- Flag of the United Arab Emirates
- IOC code: UAE
- NOC: United Arab Emirates National Olympic Committee
- Website: www.uaenoc.ae (in Arabic and English)

in Beijing
- Competitors: 8 in 7 sports
- Flag bearers: Maitha Al Maktoum (opening); Omar Jouma Bilal Al-Salfa (closing)
- Medals: Gold 0 Silver 0 Bronze 0 Total 0

Summer Olympics appearances (overview)
- 1984; 1988; 1992; 1996; 2000; 2004; 2008; 2012; 2016; 2020; 2024

The United Arab Emirates participated at the 2008 Summer Olympics in Beijing, China, which were held from 8 to 24 August 2008. The country's participation at the Beijing Olympics marked its seventh appearance in the Summer Olympics since its début at the 1984 Summer Olympics. The delegation sent by the United Arab Emirates National Olympic Committee consisted of eight athletes in seven sports: athletics, equestrian, judo, sailing, shooting, swimming and taekwondo. Two of the eight athletes were women, making Beijing the first time the country had sent female athletes to a Summer Olympiad, and most of their athletes qualified for the Games by using a wild card or receiving an invitation from the Tripartite Commission. The country did not win any medals at the Games; the best performance of the delegation was from sport shooter Ahmad Al-Makotum, who placed seventh in the qualification round of the men's double trap and lost a subsequent four-man shoot-out.

== Background ==
The United Arab Emirates National Olympic Committee was recognised by the International Olympic Committee (IOC) on 1 January 1980. The nation made its debut at the Olympic Games four years later at the 1984 Los Angeles Summer Olympics, and has taken part in every Summer Olympics since, making Beijing their seventh appearance in a Summer Olympiad. As of 2020, it has never participated in a Winter Olympic Games. The country has won a single medal, a gold medal in the sport of shooting. The 2008 Summer Olympics were held from 8–24 August 2008; a total of 10,942 athletes represented 204 National Olympic Committees. In April 2008, the United Arab Emirates National Olympic Committee announced its largest delegation of athletes to an Olympic Games in sixteen years, with eight for Beijing. They were sprinter Omar Jouma Bilal Al-Salfa, equestrian rider Latifah bint Ahmed Al Maktoum, judoka Saeed Rashid Al Qubaisi, sailor Adil Mohammad, shooters Ahmad Al Maktoum and Saeed Al Maktoum, short-distance swimmer Obaid Al Jasmi and taekwondo Maitha Al Maktoum. All the athletes were promised monetary awards of $272,000 if they won a gold medal, $200,000 for a silver medal and $136,000 for a bronze medal. The inclusion of Latifah and Matiha Al Maktoum marked the first time the United Arab Emirates had sent female athletes to an Olympic Games. Maitha Al Makotum was selected the flag bearer for the opening ceremony, while Al-Salfa carried it at the closing ceremony.

== Athletics ==
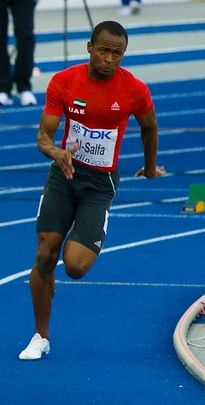
Omar Jouma Bilal Al-Salfa (pictured in 2009) was the only athletics competitor for the United Arab Emirates in Beijing.

At the age of 18, Omar Jouma Bilal Al-Salfa was the only athlete representing the United Arab Emirates in athletics competition. Beijing was his only appearance in the Olympic Games. Al-Salfa qualified for the men's 200 metres by using a wildcard as the best non qualifying athlete for his country, because his personal best time of 20.94 seconds was 0.19 seconds slower than the "B" qualifying standard for the discipline. He spent six weeks preparing for the Games at a training camp in Poland with the team's national coach Vasko Anguelov Dimov. Al-Salfa's objective was to improve his personal best and to reach the second round, saying, "I must do something good at this Olympics. If I don't, I will not be happy." On 18 August, he was placed in heat seven of the men's 200 metres. Al-Salfa finished seventh and last out of all the finishing sprinters with a time of 21 seconds. Only the top three from a heat and the eight next fastest overall from all ten heats were allowed to advance to the second round, and Al-Salfa was eliminated since he was 40th overall. (Note: Three athletes did not finish and one failed to start.)

Key

- Note–Ranks given for track events are within the athlete's heat only
- NR = National record

Men

Athlete	Event	Heat		Quarterfinal		Semifinal		Final	
Athlete	Event	Result	Rank	Result	Rank	Result	Rank	Result	Rank
Omar Jouma Bilal Al-Salfa	200 m	21.00	7	did not advance					

== Equestrian ==
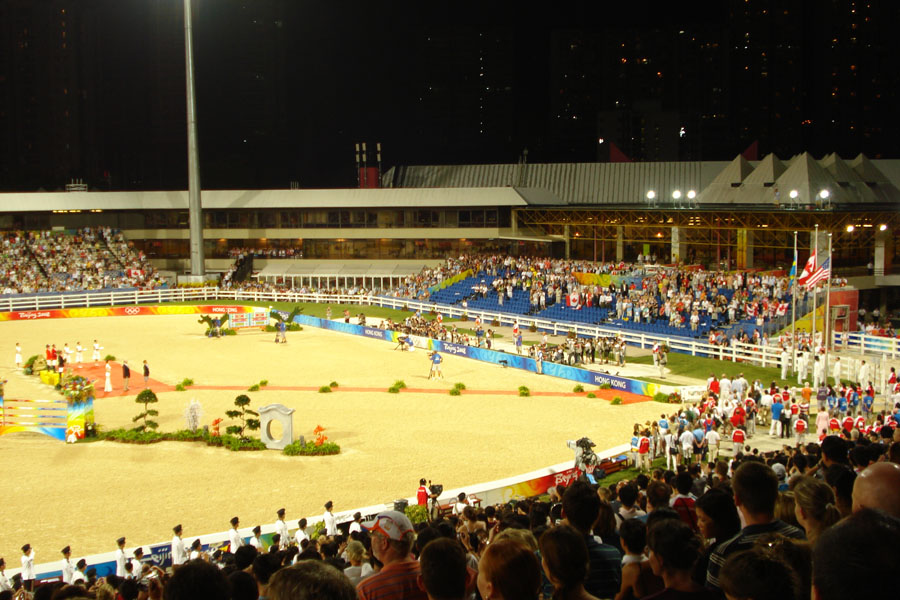
The Hong Kong Sports Institute, where Shaikha Latifah Bint Ahmad Bin Juma Al Maktoum took part in show jumping competition.

Shaikha Latifah Bint Ahmad Bin Juma Al Maktoum was 22 years old at the time of the Beijing Summer Games, and was making her only appearance in an Olympic Games. She automatically qualified for the women's individual jumping contest because her time of 47.72 seconds at the Seventh Qatar International Show Jumping Championship in March 2007 was sufficient to make the Games. Latifah Al Maktoum missed the 2007 Pan Arab Games in Cairo to focus on training for the Olympics. Before the Games, she said of her performance at the show jumping event in Qatar, "I was under tremendous pressure in the first two rounds and it is always difficult to perform under pressure. It wasn't an easy course, as we saw not many riders get through, but in the end all that matters is the qualifier for the Olympics and I have done it."

During the first part of the August 15 preliminary round, Latifah Al Maktoum and her horse Kalska De Semilly accrued eight penalty points from jump penalties and three points from time penalties, earning eleven penalty points overall. Of the 77 competitors in this first portion of the event, she tied with Saudi Arabia's Faisal Al-Shalan and Kamal Bahamdan for 61st overall. In the second round, the pair accrued twelve jumping penalty points and three for time penalties. This placed Latifah Al Maktoum 54th out of 70 finishing riders, tying Bahamdan and Bruce Goodin of New Zealand, and she was eliminated from the competition.

=== Show jumping ===
Athlete	Horse	Event	Qualification								Final					Total	
Athlete	Horse	Event	Round 1		Round 2			Round 3			Round A		Round B			Total	
Athlete	Horse	Event	Penalties	Rank	Penalties	Total	Rank	Penalties	Total	Rank	Penalties	Rank	Penalties	Total	Rank	Penalties	Rank
Latifah bint Ahmed Al Maktoum	Kalska De Semilly	Individual	11	61	15	26	54	did not advance								26	54

== Judo ==
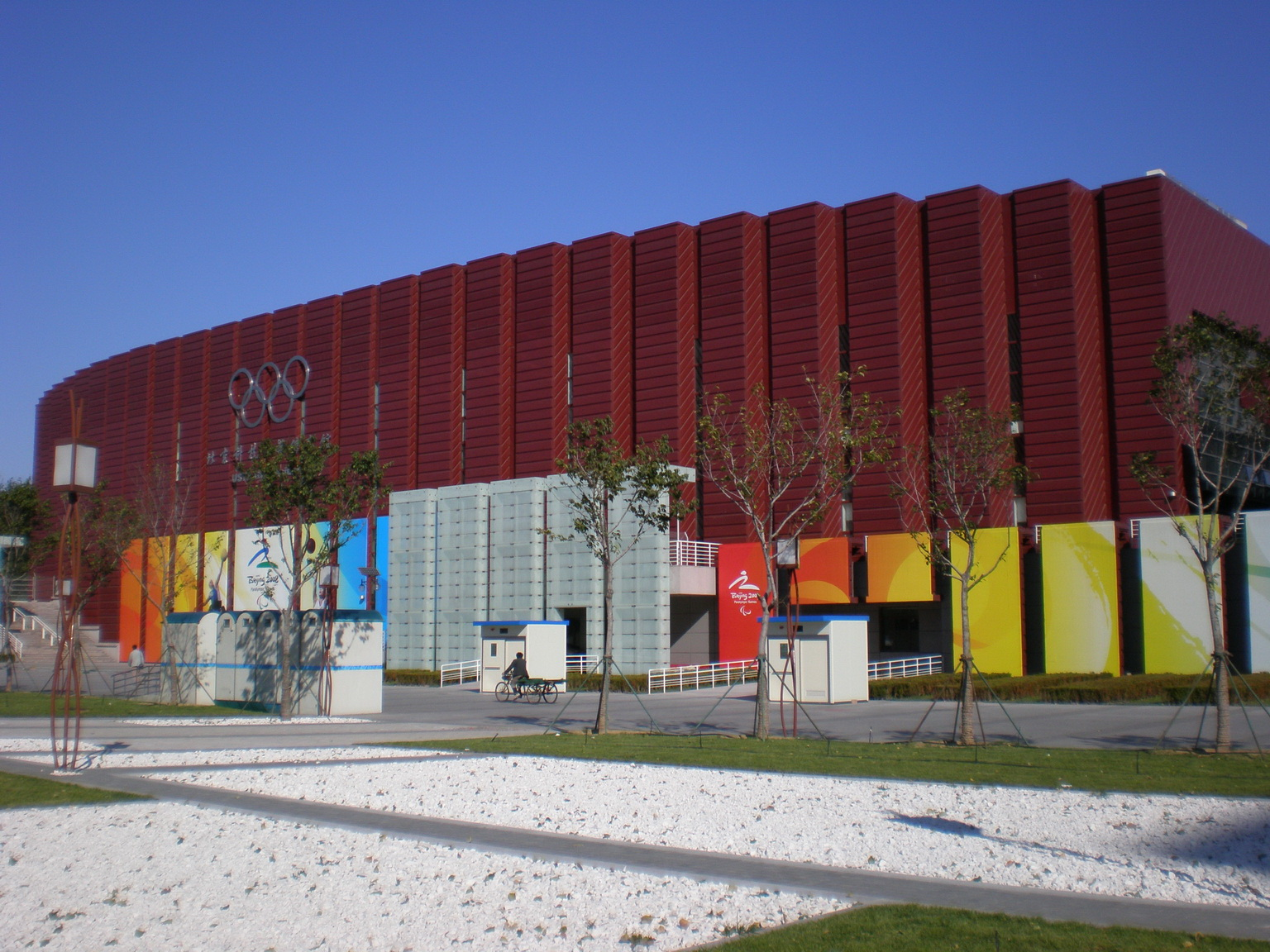
Al Qubaisi competed as a judoka at the Beijing Science and Technology University Gymnasium.

The United Arab Emirates selected Saeed Rashid Al Qubaisi as the athlete to take part in men's judo. At the time of the Beijing Summer Olympics, he was the youngest athlete to represent his country at the Beijing Games at the age of 18 and was the first Emirati judoka to compete in Olympic combat sports. Al Quabisi qualified to compete in the men's lightweight (−73kg) tournament after receiving an invitation from the Tripartite Commission to allow athletes from National Olympic Committees with small delegations to enter the Games. He trained with the Tunisian national judo team at the Abu Dhabi Combat Club and later visited training camps in Belarus and Tunisia to prepare for the Olympics. Al Qubaisi said before the Games that he hoped to win the gold medal and felt ready, "I feel proud and I will look to do my country proud. Like this I can be an example to many youngsters, that you can be an Olympian at 18." He was drawn to face Marlon August of South Africa in the Round of 32 at the Beijing Science and Technology University Gymnasium on 11 August. In the one-minute-and-27-second match, Al Qubaisi was thrown onto the mat by August, who won by an Ippon score, preventing Al Qubaisi from advancing further.

Athlete	Event	Round of 32	Round of 16	Quarterfinals	Semifinals	Repechage 1	Repechage 2	Repechage 3	Final / BM	
Athlete	Event	Opposition Result	Opposition Result	Opposition Result	Opposition Result	Opposition Result	Opposition Result	Opposition Result	Opposition Result	Rank
Saeed Rashid Al Qubaisi	Men's −73 kg	August (RSA); L 0000–1000	did not advance							

== Sailing ==
Adil Mohammad was competing in his only Olympic Games and was 18 years old at the time of the Beijing Summer Olympics. He was the first sailor from an Arab country to compete in the sport at the Olympics. Mohammad qualified to take part in the men's laser sailing category after he was granted a wild card invitation by the Tripartite Commission. He trained and competed in sailing competitions across Europe for seven months as preparation for the Games. Before the Olympics, Mohammad spoke of his pride of representing the United Arab Emirates at the Olympics and stated he felt confident about winning the gold medal in his category: "It is the dream of every athlete and sportsperson to compete in the Olympics. So it has been my dream as well. Now that I am going to Beijing, I feel proud of myself, I feel proud for my country and I hope to put the UAE on top of the world." He competed in the one-person dinghy event, where he was assessed using a score derived from his participation in nine distinct races. In the first and second races, Mohammed finished 38th; in the third, 42nd; in the fourth, 43rd (and last); in the fifth, 11th (his highest); in the sixth, 36th; in the seventh, 42nd; in the eighth, 38th; and in the ninth, 27th. A tenth race was scheduled but cancelled. Overall, he ranked 42nd out of 43 sailors, his worst result of 43rd in the fourth race did not count towards his final position, earning a collective 272 points across all nine races.

Athlete	Event	Race											Net points	Final rank
Athlete	Event	1	2	3	4	5	6	7	8	9	10	M*	Net points	Final rank
Adil Mohammad	Laser	38	38	42	~~43~~	11	36	42	38	27	CAN	EL	272	42

M = Medal race; EL = Eliminated – did not advance into the medal race; CAN = Race cancelled; Discard is crossed out and does not count for the overall result

== Shooting ==
The oldest member of the team at the age of 44, Sheikh Ahmad Al-Makotum was making his third appearance at a Summer Olympiad, having previously represented the United Arab Emirates at the 2000 Sydney Summer Olympics and the 2004 Athens Olympic Games. He won the nation's first gold medal in men's double trap at the 2004 Summer Olympics. Ahmad Al-Makotum qualified for the men's trap and double trap after winning two quota spots reserved by the International Shooting Sport Federation for athletes who met the minimum qualification scores of 112 and 118 points at the 2005 World Shotgun Championships in Lonato del Garda, Italy. He began his preparation for the Games two months beforehand, but said to The New Indian Express he was not expecting to win anything in Beijing. On 9 August he competed in the qualification round of men's trap, finishing 30th out of 35 shooters with a score of 110. He equalled the score of Lee Wung Yew of Singapore and Ireland's Derek Burnett. Ahmad Al-Makotum's tournament ended at the qualification round since he scored nine fewer points than the lowest-scoring qualifier. Three days later, he took part in the qualifying round of the men's double trap, tying for sixth with a score of 136 points. Ahmad Al-Makotum subsequently lost a four-way shoot-out to determine the sixth shooter to qualify for the final between Australia's Russell Mark, William Chetcuti of Malta and Hungary's Roland Gerebics since all four had the same score. Ultimately, he was ranked seventh.

Sheikh Saeed Al Maktoum, a cousin of Ahmad Al-Makotum, was 31 years old at the time of the Beijing Olympics. He also represented the United Arab Emirates at the 2000 Sydney Summer Games and the 2004 Athens Summer Olympics but did not medal. Saeed Al Maktoum earned automatic qualification for the men's skeet because he met the minimum qualification score of 114 points in the category at the 2007 Asian Shooting Championships in Kuwait City, where he won the bronze medal. He began training for his tournament after arriving in Beijing on 26 July. Saeed Al Maktoum said of his chances, "I have confidence in my capability, but I haven't got used to the shooting range yet. There are many ups and downs at the back (mountains). But in our country, the range is flat. We believe in God. If God gives you, nobody could take it away." On 15 August he participated in the first heat of the qualification round of the men's skeet, finishing 22nd out of 41 participants with a score of 114 points. He scored seven fewer points than the highest-scoring athlete, Vincent Hancock of the United States, and four fewer than the lowest scoring qualifier, Qu Ridong of China; his competition thus ended at the qualifying round. He would again represent the United Arab Emirates at the 2012 Summer Olympics and the 2016 Rio Olympics.

Men

Athlete	Event	Qualification		Final	
Athlete	Event	Points	Rank	Points	Rank
Ahmad Al Maktoum	Trap	110	30	did not advance	
Ahmad Al Maktoum	Double trap	136	7	did not advance	
Saeed Al Maktoum	Skeet	114	22	did not advance	

== Swimming ==
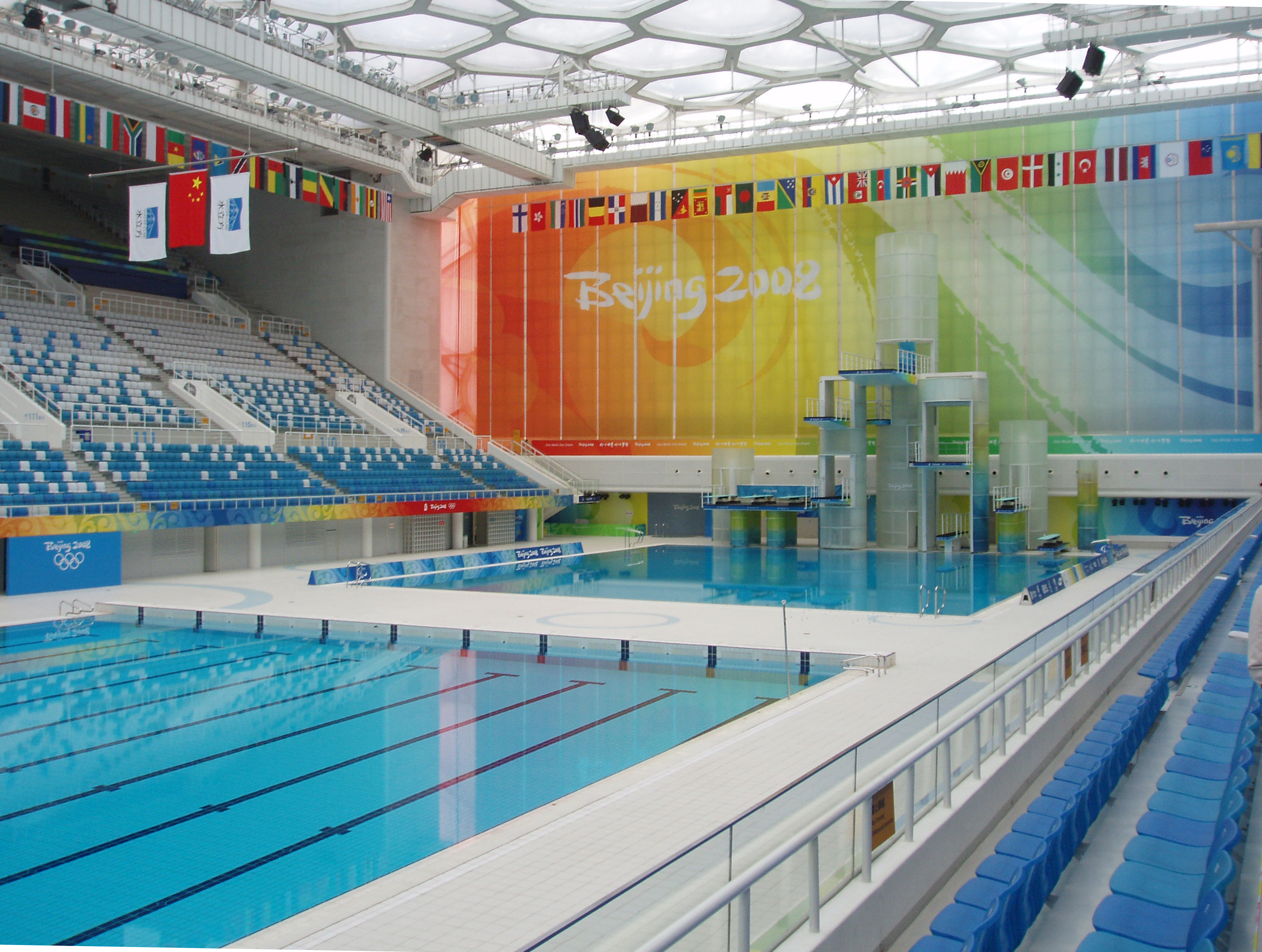
The Beijing National Aquatics Centre, where Al Jasmi took part in swimming contests.

27-year-old police officer Obaid Al Jasmi was competing in his second Olympic Games after representing the United Arab Emirates four years earlier at the 2004 Summer Olympics in Athens. Although his best time of 53.70 seconds was 2.75 seconds slower than the "B" (FINA/Olympic) qualifying time for the event, he entered the men's 100 metres freestyle after being granted a universality place issued to swimmers who did not qualify on merit from the world governing body of swimming, FINA. Al Jasmi had less than two months to prepare for the Games. He set himself the objective of improving his personal best time at the Olympics but noted the strong competition he would face. On 12 August, Al Jasmi competed in the six-swimmer heat two of the contest. He placed last with a new national-record time of 53.29 seconds. Al Jasmi ranked 61st out of 64 swimmers overall and did not advance into the semi-finals since only the top sixteen overall finishers were allowed to progress. (Note: One swimmer, Milorad Čavić, withdrew from the tournament.) After the Olympics, he spoke of his satisfaction of his performance: "I benefited greatly from my participation in the Olympic Games and succeeded in bettering my personal record and I am looking forward to taking part in the GCC Championships and I am determined to achieve good results."

Men

Athlete	Event	Heat		Semifinal		Final	
Athlete	Event	Time	Rank	Time	Rank	Time	Rank
Obaid Al Jasmi	100 m freestyle	53.29 NR	61	did not advance			

== Taekwondo ==
Sheikha Maitha Al Maktoum, a cousin of Saeed and Ahmad Al Maktoum, was 28 years old at the time of the Beijing Summer Olympics and was making her debut appearance in the Olympic Games. She was announced as a qualified competitor for the women's middleweight (−67kg) taekwondo competition after the IOC cleared her to participate following the allocation of quota places for athletes deemed to have "an extraordinary record in their sporting discipline." Maitha Al Maktoum trained at the Kyung Hee University in the South Korean capital city of Seoul to prepare for the Games. She said before the Olympics, "Everybody who is going to compete in Beijing is going there to win and I am no exception. I have to respect them all. They have all dedicated themselves to this and the only thing they want is a medal. I am the same though and I will have to match their focus if I am to succeed." Maitha Al Maktoum faced South Korea's Hwang Kyung-seon in the Round of 16 on 22 August. She lost to her opponent 5–1 in points and was defeated 4–0 in her repechage match against Sandra Šarić of Croatia, ending her chance of a bronze medal. After the tournament, Matiha Al Maktoum stated, "It's a dream and a nightmare at the same time. I couldn't wait until it was going to happen. And now I can't believe it's over. I think I performed well for what my background is and my experience."

Athlete	Event	Round of 16	Quarterfinals	Semifinals	Repechage	Bronze Medal	Final	
Athlete	Event	Opposition Result	Opposition Result	Opposition Result	Opposition Result	Opposition Result	Opposition Result	Rank
Maitha Al Maktoum	Women's −67 kg	Hwang K-S (KOR); L 1–5	did not advance		Šarić (CRO); L 0–4	did not advance		

== See also ==
- United Arab Emirates at the 2008 Summer Paralympics
