= United Arab Emirates at the 2015 World Aquatics Championships =

- Flag of the United Arab Emirates
- World Aquatics code: UAE
- National federation: UAE Swimming Federation
- Website: www.uaeswimming.com

in Kazan, Russia
- Competitors: 5 in 2 sports
- Medals: Gold 0 Silver 0 Bronze 0 Total 0

World Aquatics Championships appearances
- 1994; 1998; 2001; 2003; 2005; 2007; 2009; 2011; 2013; 2015; 2017; 2019; 2022; 2023; 2024; 2025

United Arab Emirates competed at the 2015 World Aquatics Championships in Kazan, Russia from 24 July to 9 August 2015.

== Open water swimming ==
United Arab Emirates has qualified one swimmer to compete in the open water marathon.

| Athlete | Event | Time | Rank |
|---|---|---|---|
| Abdulla Al-Balooshi | Men's 5 km | 1:09:39.3 | 47 |
| Abdulla Al-Balooshi | Men's 10 km | 2:14:43.3 | 67 |

== Swimming ==
Emirati swimmers have achieved qualifying standards in the following events (up to a maximum of 2 swimmers in each event at the A-standard entry time, and 1 at the B-standard):

Men

| Athlete | Event | Heat | | Semifinal | | Final | |
| Athlete | Event | Time | Rank | Time | Rank | Time | Rank |
|---|---|---|---|---|---|---|---|
| Mubarak Al-Besher | 100 m breaststroke | 1:09.08 | 70 | did not advance | | | |
| Yaaqoub Al-Saadi | 50 m backstroke | 28.04 | 55 | did not advance | | | |
| Yaaqoub Al-Saadi | 100 m backstroke | 1:01.04 | 60 | did not advance | | | |

Women

| Athlete | Event | Heat | | Semifinal | | Final | |
| Athlete | Event | Time | Rank | Time | Rank | Time | Rank |
|---|---|---|---|---|---|---|---|
| Nada Al-Bedwawi | 100 m backstroke | 1:35.83 | 66 | did not advance | | | |
| Alia Al-Shamsi | 100 m breaststroke | DSQ | | did not advance | | | |
