= United Arab Emirates at the 2016 Summer Olympics =

- Flag of the United Arab Emirates
- IOC code: UAE
- NOC: United Arab Emirates National Olympic Committee
- Website: olympic.ae (in Arabic)

in Rio de Janeiro
- Competitors: 13 in 6 sports
- Flag bearer: Nada Al-Bedwawi
- Medals Ranked 78th: Gold 0 Silver 0 Bronze 1 Total 1

Summer Olympics appearances (overview)
- 1984; 1988; 1992; 1996; 2000; 2004; 2008; 2012; 2016; 2020; 2024

United Arab Emirates competed at the 2016 Summer Olympics in Rio de Janeiro, from 5 to 21 August 2016. This was the nation's ninth consecutive appearance at the Summer Olympics.

The United Arab Emirates National Olympic Committee selected a team of 13 athletes, 9 men and 4 women, to compete in six different sports at the Games. The nation's full roster in Rio de Janeiro was half the size of the delegation sent to London (26 athletes), and had the largest share of female athletes in its Summer Olympic history.

The Emirati roster featured five naturalized athletes: three Moldovan-born judokas Victor Scvortov, Sergiu Toma, and Ivan Remarenco, and two Ethiopian-born runners Alia Saeed Mohammed and Betlhem Desalegn. Other notable athletes on the Emirati team included skeet shooter Saeed Al-Maktoum, who competed at his fifth consecutive Games as the most experienced member, and freestyle swimmer Nada Al-Bedwawi, who was selected by the committee, as the youngest member (aged 19), to carry the Emirati flag in the opening ceremony.

United Arab Emirates left Rio de Janeiro with its first Olympic medal since double trap shooter Ahmed Al Maktoum topped the podium in Athens 2004. It was awarded to three-time judoka Toma, who took the bronze in men's half-middleweight category (81 kg).

== Medalists ==
| Medal | Name | Sport | Event | Date |
|---|---|---|---|---|
| Bronze | Sergiu Toma | Judo | Men's 81 kg | 9 August |

== Athletics ==
Emirati athletes have so far achieved qualifying standards in the following athletics events (up to a maximum of 3 athletes in each event):

Key

- Note–Ranks given for track events are within the athlete's heat only
- Q = Qualified for the next round
- q = Qualified for the next round as a fastest loser or, in field events, by position without achieving the qualifying target
- NR = National record
- N/A = Round not applicable for the event
- Bye = Athlete not required to compete in round

Track & road events

| Athlete | Event | Heat | | Semifinal | | Final | |
| Athlete | Event | Result | Rank | Result | Rank | Result | Rank |
|---|---|---|---|---|---|---|---|
| Saud Al-Zaabi | Men's 1500 m | 4:02.35 | 13 | Did not advance | | | |
| Betlhem Desalegn | Women's 1500 m | DNS | | Did not advance | | | |
| Alia Saeed Mohammed | Women's 10000 m | —N/a | | | | 31:56.74 | 23 |

== Cycling ==
=== Road ===
United Arab Emirates has qualified one rider in the men's Olympic road race by virtue of his top two individual ranking at the 2015 Asian Championships, signifying the nation's Olympic comeback to the sport for the first time since 1996.

| Athlete | Event | Time | Rank |
|---|---|---|---|
| Yousif Mirza | Men's road race | Did not finish | |

== Judo ==
United Arab Emirates has qualified three judokas for each of the following weight classes at the Games. Moldovan-born Victor Scvortov and London 2012 Olympian Sergiu Toma were ranked among the top 22 eligible judokas for men in the IJF World Ranking List of May 30, 2016, while Ivan Remarenco at men's half-heavyweight (100 kg) earned a continental quota spot from the Asian region, as the highest-ranked Emirati judoka outside of direct qualifying position.

| Athlete | Event | Round of 64 | Round of 32 | Round of 16 | Quarterfinals | Semifinals | Repechage | Final / BM | |
| Athlete | Event | Opposition Result | Opposition Result | Opposition Result | Opposition Result | Opposition Result | Opposition Result | Opposition Result | Rank |
|---|---|---|---|---|---|---|---|---|---|
| Victor Scvortov | Men's −73 kg | Bye | Mater (YEM); W 101–000 | Ono (JPN); L 000–100 | Did not advance | | | | |
| Sergiu Toma | Men's −81 kg | Bye | Maresch (GER); W 101–000 | Penalber (BRA); W 101–001 | Nagase (JPN); W 001–000 | Khalmurzaev (RUS); L 100–000 | Bye | Marconcini (ITA); W 100–000 | 3rd place, bronze medalist(s) |
| Ivan Remarenco | Men's −100 kg | Bye | Bouyacoub (ALG); L 000–010 | Did not advance | | | | | |

== Shooting ==
Emirati shooters have achieved quota places for the following events by virtue of their best finishes at the 2014 and 2015 ISSF World Championships, the 2015 ISSF World Cup series, and Asian Championships, as long as they obtained a minimum qualifying score (MQS) as of March 31, 2016.

| Athlete | Event | Qualification | | Semifinal | | Final | |
| Athlete | Event | Points | Rank | Points | Rank | Points | Rank |
|---|---|---|---|---|---|---|---|
| Khaled Al-Kaabi | Men's double trap | 134 | 9 | Did not advance | | | |
| Saeed Al-Maktoum | Men's skeet | 118 | 17 | Did not advance | | | |
| Saif bin Futtais | Men's skeet | 114 | 29 | Did not advance | | | |

Qualification Legend: Q = Qualify for the next round; q = Qualify for the bronze medal (shotgun)

== Swimming ==
United Arab Emirates has received a Universality invitation from FINA to send two swimmers (one male and one female) to the Olympics.

| Athlete | Event | Heat | | Semifinal | | Final | |
| Athlete | Event | Time | Rank | Time | Rank | Time | Rank |
|---|---|---|---|---|---|---|---|
| Yaaqoub Al-Saadi | Men's 100 m backstroke | 59.58 | 37 | Did not advance | | | |
| Nada Al-Bedwawi | Women's 50 m freestyle | 33.42 | 78 | Did not advance | | | |

== Weightlifting ==
United Arab Emirates has received an unused quota place from IWF to send a female weightlifter to the Olympics.

| Athlete | Event | Snatch | | Clean & Jerk | | Total | Rank |
| Athlete | Event | Result | Rank | Result | Rank | Total | Rank |
|---|---|---|---|---|---|---|---|
| Ayesha Al-Balooshi | Women's −58 kg | 72 | 16 | 90 | 16 | 162 | 16 |

== See also ==
- United Arab Emirates at the 2016 Summer Paralympics
