= United Arab Emirates at the 2012 Summer Olympics =

- Flag of the United Arab Emirates
- IOC code: UAE
- NOC: United Arab Emirates National Olympic Committee
- Website: www.olympic.ae (in Arabic and English)

in London
- Competitors: 26 in 6 sports
- Flag bearer: Saeed Al Maktoum (opening ceremony)
- Medals: Gold 0 Silver 0 Bronze 0 Total 0

Summer Olympics appearances (overview)
- 1984; 1988; 1992; 1996; 2000; 2004; 2008; 2012; 2016; 2020; 2024; 2028

The United Arab Emirates participated in the 2012 Summer Olympics in London, United Kingdom, which were held from 27 July to 12 August 2012. The country's participation at the London Olympics marked its eighth appearance in the Summer Olympic Games since its début at the 1984 Summer Olympics. The delegation sent by the United Arab Emirates National Olympic Committee consisted of 26 athletes in six different sports: athletics, association football, judo, shooting, swimming and weightlifting. Two of the 26 athletes were women, which included the first Emirati Olympic weightlifter, Khadija Mohammed. The nation also made its Olympic debut in association football with its national under-23 team. None of the athletes won any medals at the Games, with the best result being a ninth-place finish for Khadija Mohammad in the women's heavyweight (–75 kg) weightlifting event.

== Background ==
The United Arab Emirates National Olympic Committee was recognised by the International Olympic Committee (IOC) on 1 January 1980. The nation debuted at the Olympics four years later at the 1984 Summer Games. The nation has taken part in every Summer Olympics since, making the 2012 Games their eighth appearance at a Summer Olympiad. They have never participated in a Winter Olympic Games. The 2012 Summer Olympics were held from 27 July to 12 August 2012; a total of 10,568 athletes represented 204 National Olympic Committees (NOC).

The United Arab Emirates named part of its Olympic team at the Dubai Aquarium on 21 June 2012. It sent 26 athletes to complete in the London Summer Olympics: 2 in track and field, 18 football players, 3 shooters, and 1 each in judo, swimming and weightlifting. This was the largest Olympic team that the nation had sent to the Olympic Games. Along with the athletes, the United Arab Emirates sent the president of its NOC, Shaikh Ahmed bin Mohammed bin Rashid Al Maktoum, various government delegates and sport executives to the Games. Shooter Saeed Al Maktoum was chosen as the flag bearer for the parade of nations during the opening ceremony, and a LOCOG Games Maker held it for the closing ceremony.

== Athletics ==
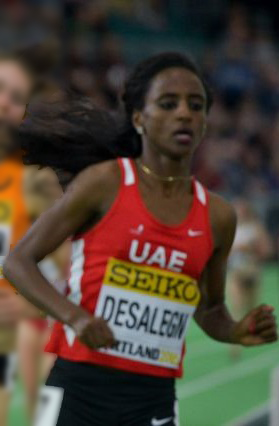
Betlhem Desalegn (pictured in 2016) was the only women to represent the United Arab Emirates in athletics.

Betlhem Desalegn was 20 years old at the time of these Games, and was making her only appearance in Olympic competition as of 2012. She qualified for the women's 1500 metres event by setting a personal best of 4 minutes, 8.87 seconds at a meet in Casablanca on 9 June 2012. Desalegn trained in Addis Ababa as preparation for the Olympics. Her coach said she could advance beyond the first round due to her light weight and fitness. On 6 August, Desalegn entered the first round of the women's 1500 metres at the Olympic Stadium, and was assigned to run in heat three. She finished the race in a time of 4 minutes, 14.07 seconds, placing 10th out of 11 finishing athletes in her heat. Since the top three in each heat plus the next fifteen fastest runners could make the semi-finals, Deslaegn was eliminated from the competition because she was 28th overall. (Note: One competitor did not start her heat, and one was unable to finish the heat stages. Seven athletes were disqualified for biological passport infringements.) She said she was disappointed with the result because of a cold slowing her.

At the age of 26, Mohamed Abbas Darwish was the only male athlete in the sport of athletics. He was making his debut at the Olympic Games in London. He used a wild card invite to enter the men's triple jump since his personal best was 5 cm (2.0 in) away from 16.85 m (55.3 ft), the "B" qualifying standard for the event. Darwish trained barefooted prior to the London Olympics. On 7 August, he took part in the qualifying round of the men's triple jump at the Olympic Stadium. On his first try, Darwish fouled, before achieving his best mark of 16.06 m (52.7 ft) on his second attempt, which put him 13th in Group B and 24th overall. (Note: One athlete did not record a mark.) Only the top 12 overall finishers were allowed to progress from the qualifying round to the final, and therefore, he was eliminated from the competition. Darwish said post-event that he did not know what happened to him because he felt nothing wrong before the competition and was unsure what had occurred to him afterwards.

Key

- Note–Ranks given for track events are within the athlete's heat only
- Bye = Athlete not required to compete in round

Men

| Athlete | Event | Qualification | | Final | |
| Athlete | Event | Distance | Position | Distance | Position |
|---|---|---|---|---|---|
| Mohammad Abbas Darwish | Triple jump | 16.06 | 24 | Did not advance | |

Women

| Athlete | Event | Heat | | Semifinal | | Final | |
| Athlete | Event | Result | Rank | Result | Rank | Result | Rank |
|---|---|---|---|---|---|---|---|
| Betlhem Desalegn | 1500 m | 4:14.07 | 10 | Did not advance | | | |

== Football ==
Ismail Matar (pictured in 2014) was the only multi-goalscorer in the men's football tournament for the United Arab Emirates.

The United Arab Emirates under-23 team qualified for the men's football tournament by leading Group B in the third preliminary round of the men's Asian qualifying rounds. It was the first time that the nation had qualified for an Olympic football competition. The 18-player squad and 4 alternate players included those from the UAE Pro League and three players aged over 23. The country was drawn to play Great Britain, Senegal and Uruguay in Group A. Its first match was against Uruguay at Old Trafford, Manchester on 26 July. Ismail Matar took the lead for the UAE with a 23rd minute goal from an Omar Abdulrahman left footed pass. Uruguay took a 2–1 win with goals from Gastón Ramírez at 42 minutes and Nicolás Lodeiro at 56 minutes with involvement from Luis Suárez both times. They faced the Great Britain side three days later at Wembley Stadium, London. Ryan Giggs headed in a Craig Bellamy cross to take the lead for the home team in the 16th minute. The UAE had tied the match at 1–1 with a goal from Rashed Eisa, but Scott Sinclair restored his team's lead from another Bellamy cross at 73 minutes. The home team took a 3–1 victory when Daniel Sturridge's shot went over UAE goalkeeper Ali Khasif. At the City of Coventry Stadium on 1 August, the UAE drew 1–1 to Senegal in its final match of the tournament, finishing fourth with one point in Group A and advancing no further.

=== Roster ===
The following is the United Arab Emirates squad in the men's football tournament of the 2012 Summer Olympics.

Coach: Mahdi Ali

| No. | Pos. | Player | Date of birth (age) | Caps | Goals | 2012 club |
|---|---|---|---|---|---|---|
| 1 | GK | Ali Khasif* | 9 June 1987 (aged 25) | | | (United Arab Emirates Football Association) Al Jazira |
| 2 | DF | Saad Surour | 19 July 1990 (aged 22) | | | (United Arab Emirates Football Association) Al Ahli |
| 3 | DF | Abdulaziz Hussain | 10 September 1990 (aged 21) | | | (United Arab Emirates Football Association) Al Shabab |
| 4 | DF | Mohamed Ahmed | 16 April 1989 (aged 23) | | | (United Arab Emirates Football Association) Al Shabab |
| 5 | MF | Amer Abdulrahman | 3 July 1989 (aged 23) | | | (United Arab Emirates Football Association) Baniyas |
| 6 | DF | Ali Alamri | 7 January 1989 (aged 23) | | | (United Arab Emirates Football Association) Al Nasr |
| 7 | MF | Ismail Al Hammadi* | 1 July 1988 (aged 24) | | | (United Arab Emirates Football Association) Al Ahli |
| 8 | DF | Hamdan Al Kamali | 2 May 1989 (aged 23) | | | (United Arab Emirates Football Association) Al Wahda |
| 9 | MF | Ahmed Ali | 28 January 1990 (aged 22) | | | (United Arab Emirates Football Association) Baniyas |
| 10 | FW | Ismail Matar* (c) | 7 April 1983 (aged 29) | | | (United Arab Emirates Football Association) Al Wahda |
| 11 | FW | Ahmed Khalil | 8 June 1991 (aged 21) | | | (United Arab Emirates Football Association) Al Ahli |
| 12 | MF | Habib Fardan | 11 November 1990 (aged 21) | | | (United Arab Emirates Football Association) Al Nasr |
| 13 | MF | Khamis Esmaeel | 16 August 1989 (aged 22) | | | (United Arab Emirates Football Association) Emirates |
| 14 | DF | Abdelaziz Sanqour | 7 May 1989 (aged 23) | | | (United Arab Emirates Football Association) Al Sharjah |
| 15 | MF | Omar Abdulrahman | 20 September 1991 (aged 20) | | | (United Arab Emirates Football Association) Al Ain |
| 16 | MF | Rashed Eisa | 24 August 1990 (aged 21) | | | (United Arab Emirates Football Association) Al Wasl |
| 17 | MF | Mohamed Fawzi | 22 February 1990 (aged 22) | | | (United Arab Emirates Football Association) Baniyas |
| 18 | GK | Khalid Eisa | 15 May 1989 (aged 23) | | | (United Arab Emirates Football Association) Al Jazira |
| 19 | FW | Ali Mabkhout (Note: Alternate player named in the squad. He played 25 minutes of the UAE's last game of the tournament.) | 10 May 1990 (aged 22) | | | (United Arab Emirates Football Association) Al Jazira |

* Over-aged player.

=== Group play ===
| Pos | Team | Pld | W | D | L | GF | GA | GD | Pts | Qualification |
|---|---|---|---|---|---|---|---|---|---|---|
| 1 | Great Britain (H) | 3 | 2 | 1 | 0 | 5 | 2 | +3 | 7 | Advance to knockout stage |
| 2 | Senegal | 3 | 1 | 2 | 0 | 4 | 2 | +2 | 5 | Advance to knockout stage |
| 3 | Uruguay | 3 | 1 | 0 | 2 | 2 | 4 | −2 | 3 | |
| 4 | United Arab Emirates | 3 | 0 | 1 | 2 | 3 | 6 | −3 | 1 | |

Source: FIFA
Rules for classification: Group stage tiebreakers
(H) Hosts
26 July 2012
17:00

| United Arab Emirates | 1–2 | Uruguay |
|---|---|---|
| Matar 23' | Report | Ramírez 42'; Lodeiro 56' |

Old Trafford, Manchester
Attendance: 51,745
Referee: Peter O'Leary (New Zealand)

29 July 2012
19:45

| Great Britain | 3–1 | United Arab Emirates |
|---|---|---|
| Giggs 16'; Sinclair 73'; Sturridge 76' | Report | Eisa 60' |

Wembley Stadium, London
Attendance: 85,137
Referee: Roberto García (Mexico)

1 August 2012
19:45

| Senegal | 1–1 | United Arab Emirates |
|---|---|---|
| Konaté 49' | Report | Matar 21' |

City of Coventry Stadium, Coventry
Attendance: 28,652
Referee: Svein Oddvar Moen (Norway)

== Judo ==
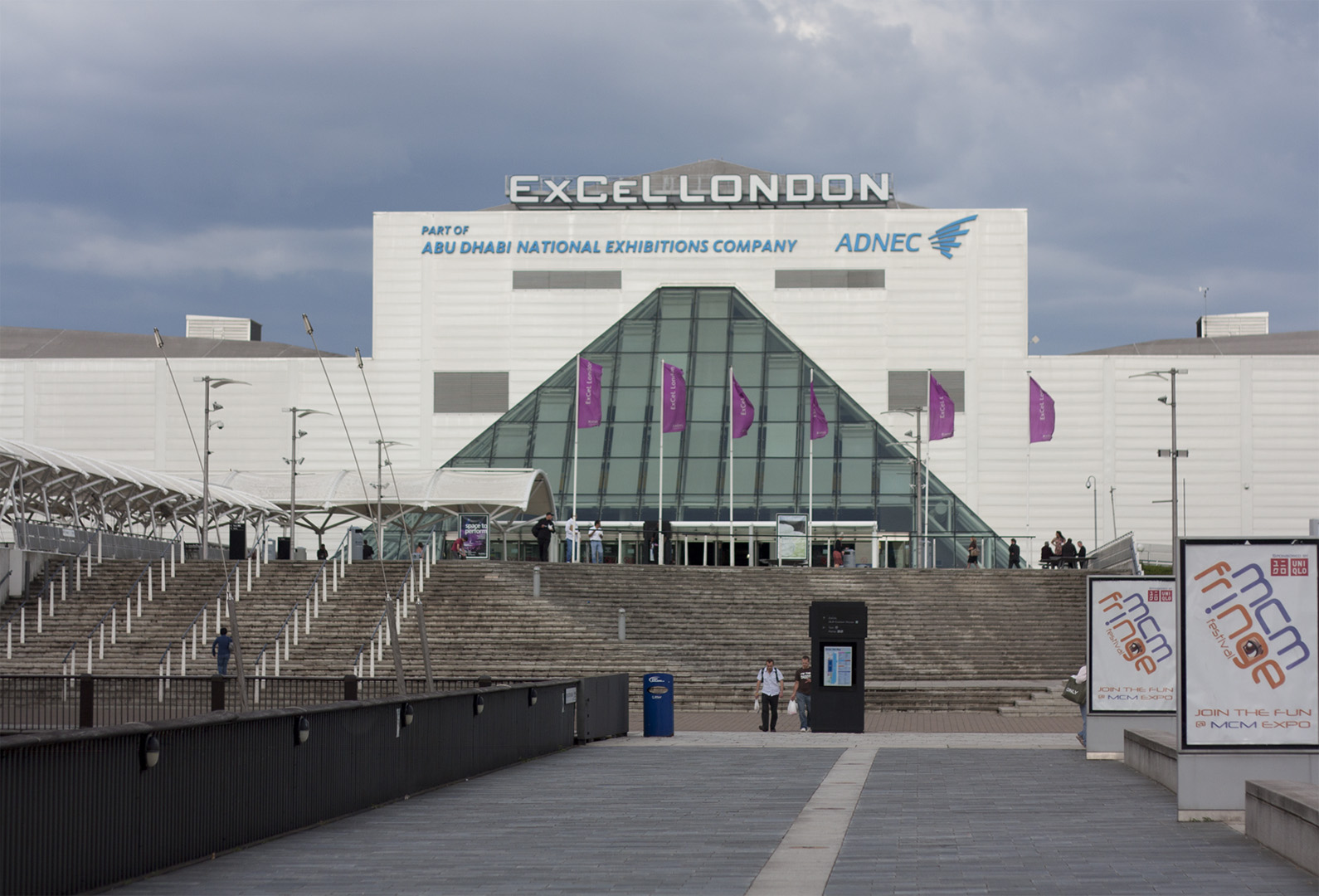
The ExCeL London, where Humaid Al-Derei took part in the judo competition

Humaid Al-Derei was 21 years old at the time of the Games. He was making his Olympic debut and was the second Emirati Olympic judoka. Al-Derei received a wild card entry to the London Summer Olympics by participating in the 2011 World Judo Championships in Paris, but this was upgraded to a direct entry through earning enough points by entering the Abu Dhabi Grand Prix over the years. He trained in Belarus, Jordan and the United Arab Emirates as preparation for the Games; he was required to wear sunglasses due to an eye disease giving him a high degree of light sensitivity. Al-Derei said his objective for the Games was to perform to the best of his ability, "I will do what I can and the rest I will leave up to God." After he received a bye for the Round of 64, he took part in the Round of 32 of the men's 66kg competition, at ExCeL London on 29 July. He faced 10th ranked judoka in the world Ahmed Awad of Egypt. Awad caused an elbow injury to Al-Derei, which restricted the latter's movement after the game commenced, and performed an ippon to win at 2 minutes, 37 seconds. Al-Derei said post-match that Awad had too tight of a grip and that his opponent was worthy of his win.

| Athlete | Event | Round of 64 | Round of 32 | Round of 16 | Quarterfinals | Semifinals | Final | Final / BM | |
| Athlete | Event | Opposition Result | Opposition Result | Opposition Result | Opposition Result | Opposition Result | Opposition Result | Opposition Result | Rank |
|---|---|---|---|---|---|---|---|---|---|
| Humaid Al-Derei | Men's −66 kg | Bye | Awad (EGY); L 0001–101 | Did not advance | | | | | |

== Shooting ==
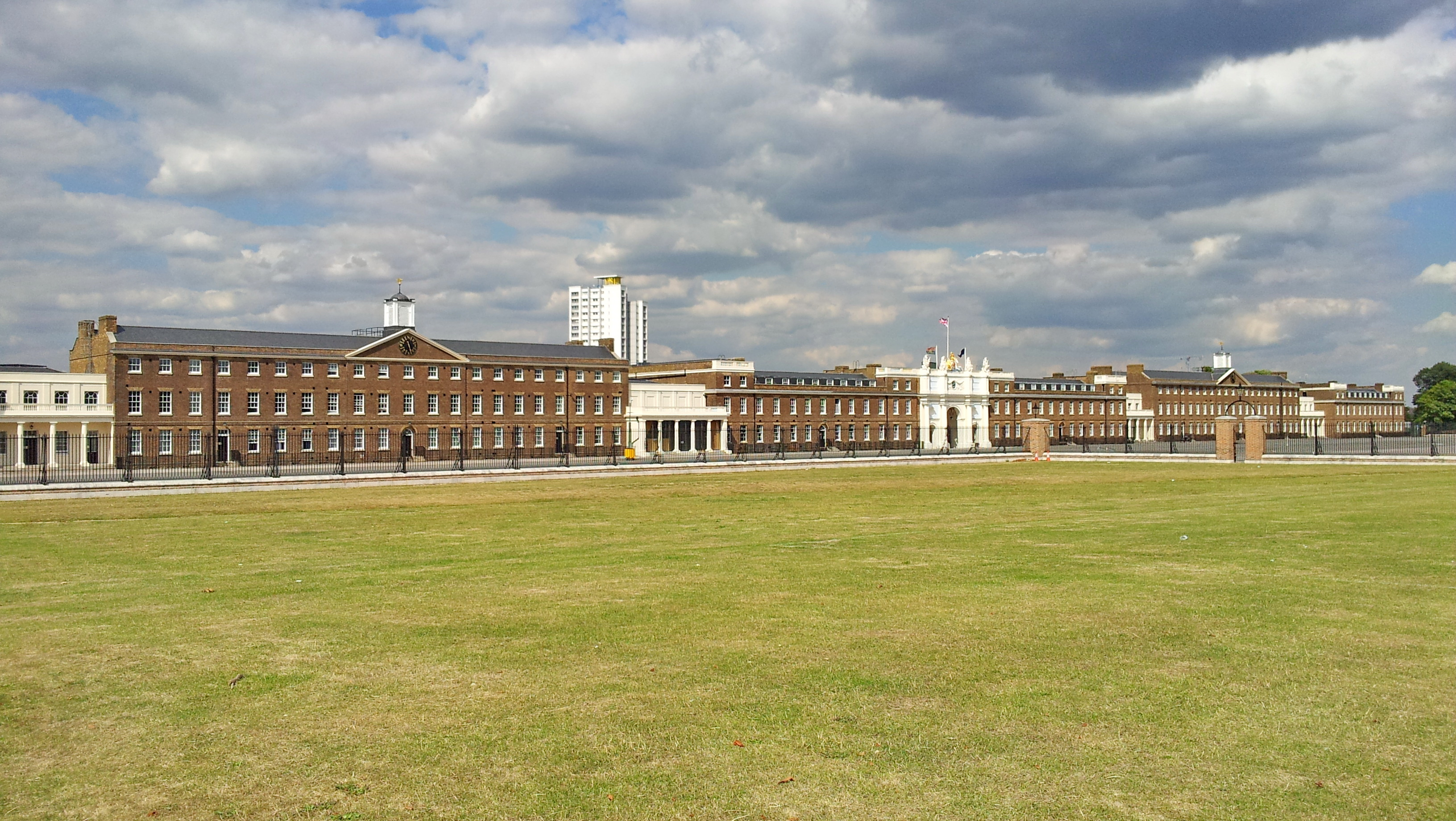
The Royal Artillery Barracks, where three Emirati shooters competed in the shooting competitions.

Aged 35 at the time of the London Olympics, Saeed Al-Maktoum was making his fourth appearance at the Olympic Games. He attained qualification for the Games after winning two bronze medals at the 2012 Asian Shooting Championships in January. Al-Maktoum trained in the United Arab Emirates and went to a camp in Italy to train for the Games. Ahmad Al Kamali, the UAE Athletics Federation president, said Al-Maktoum's experience gave him an opportunity to win. On 31 July, Al-Maktoum took part in the qualification round of the skeet tournament at the Royal Artillery Barracks. He finished 13th of the 36 participants with a score of 118 points. Al-Makotum was thus eliminated at the qualification round since he scored two points less than the two lowest scoring qualifiers. He said afterwards that some errors in the qualification round and hurrying himself on occasion led to his elimination.

Juma Al-Maktoum was 27 years old at the London Games, and was debuting in Olympic competition. He qualified for the Olympic double trap tournament after winning the gold medal in the discipline at the 2012 Asian Shooting Championships. Al-Maktoum went to a camp outside Milan to train before the Games. He said he was happy to participate at the Olympics and that he had no issues in his training. On 2 August, Al-Maktoum competed in the qualification round of the men's double trap at the Royal Artillery Barracks. He finished 13th out of 23 finishers with a score of 133 points after he scored 42, 45 and 46 points in all three rounds. (Note: One shooter, Sergio Piñero, was unable to finish.) Al-Maktoum scored four less points than the two lowest qualifiers and was not able to advance to the final.

The oldest member of the team at the age of 39, Dhaher Al-Aryani debuted at the Olympics. He qualified for the men's trap event by using a quota place from scoring enough points delegated by the International Shooting Sport Federation at the 2012 Asian Shooting Championships. Al-Aryani partook in the men's trap qualification round at the Royal Artillery Barracks between 5 and 6 August. The team's trap shooting coach Rustam Yambulatov said on 6 August that Al-Aryani would be helped if the weather was hot. Al-Aryani placed 32nd out of the 34 entrants with a two-day score total of 107. He accumulated 15 points less than the two lowest ranked qualifiers and his competition ended at the qualification round. After the Games, Al-Aryani said, "Now after finishing this competition against some of the world's best champion shooters, I have learnt so much that I feel confident for the future."

=== Men ===
| Athlete | Event | Qualification | | Final | |
| Athlete | Event | Points | Rank | Points | Rank |
|---|---|---|---|---|---|
| Dhaher Al-Aryani | Trap | 107 | 32 | Did not advance | |
| Juma Al-Maktoum | Double trap | 133 | 13 | Did not advance | |
| Saeed Al-Maktoum | Skeet | 118 | 13 | Did not advance | |

== Swimming ==
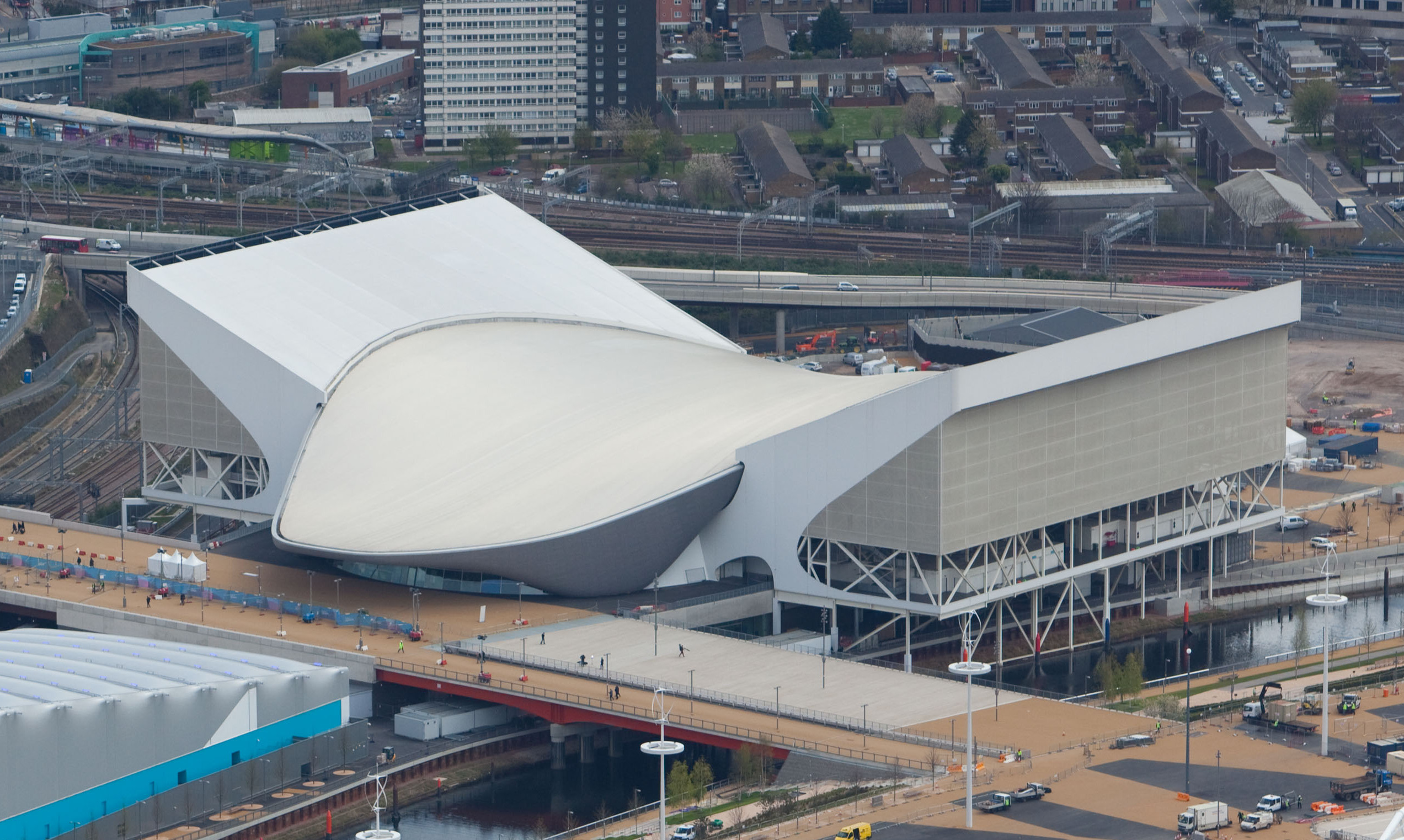
The London Aquatics Centre, where Mubrarak Al-Besher competed in the men's 100 metre breaststroke event.

Mubarak Al-Besher was aged 24 and competing in his first Olympic Games. FINA granted the nation a universality place, after Al-Besher's personal best of 1 minute, 4.60 seconds recorded at the 2011 Arab Games was 1.68 seconds slower than the FINA/Olympic Invitation qualifying standard for the men's 100 metre breaststroke. He trained in Málaga and swam the first leg of the Mare Nostrum meets as preparation for the Games. Al-Besher said he would perform to the best of his ability. He added, "My first goal is to break an Arab record and accomplish something no other Arab has done. So God willing, if I clock 1min 3sec or 1min 2sec, I will be very happy in London." On 28 July, he competed in the first heat of the contest at the London Aquatics Centre, finishing second out of four swimmers, with a time of 1 minute, 5.26 seconds. Al-Besher came 42nd out of 44 swimmers overall and failed to advance to the semi-finals since the quickest 16 competitors could enter the semi-finals. After he was eliminated, he commented on his result, "I was very nervous today because it was my first time at the Olympics but still I'm happy I got the chance to compete against the best in the world."

=== Men ===
| Athlete | Event | Heat | | Semifinal | | Final | |
| Athlete | Event | Time | Rank | Time | Rank | Time | Rank |
|---|---|---|---|---|---|---|---|
| Mubarak Al Besher | 100 m breaststroke | 1:05.26 | 42 | Did not advance | | | |

== Weightlifting ==
Khadija Mohammed participated on the United Arab Emirates's behalf in the sport of weightlifting. At age 17, she was the youngest athlete to represent the nation at the 2012 London Games, and was making her debut in the Olympics. Mohammed was chosen to be the nation's only entrant in weightlifting by the Emirates Weightlifting Federation, after it finished fifth at the 2012 Asian Weightlifting Championships. She was the first Olympic woman athlete from the UAE to earn automatic qualification, the first Gulf female Olympic weightlifter and the first head scarf or hijab wearing athlete in her Olympic sport. While she had trained prior to the Games, financial issues and postponed payment of salaries were reasons that it became worse. Mohammed said that she wanted to venture to the Olympics with the goal to create an impression for Emirati and Gulf women and inspire girls to get into weightlifting. On 3 August, she partook in the women's heavyweight (–75 kg) weightlifting competition at ExCel London. During the event's snatch phase, Mohammed was given three attempts. She successfully lifted 51 kg (112 lb) of weight before she could not lift 53 kg (117 lb). Mohammed then successfully lifted up to 62 kg (137 lb) during her three tries in the clean and jerk phase. Overall, the combination of her highest scores in snatch and clean and jerk yielded a score of 113 points. Mohammed ranked ninth in the event. (Note: Three weightlifters were disqualified for doping offences and one did not finish.) Afterwards she said, "I would never trade this feeling for anything else in the world. This was my time to do something for my country and I think I did the UAE proud. There is nothing more than this feeling and I want to go on and bring medals for my country."

| Athlete | Event | Snatch | | Clean & Jerk | | Total | Rank |
| Athlete | Event | Result | Rank | Result | Rank | Total | Rank |
|---|---|---|---|---|---|---|---|
| Khadija Mohammad | Women's −75 kg | 51 | 9 | 62 | 9 | 113 | 9 |

== See also ==
- United Arab Emirates at the 2012 Summer Paralympics
