= United Arab Emirates at the 1988 Summer Olympics =

- Flag of the United Arab Emirates
- IOC code: UAE
- NOC: United Arab Emirates National Olympic Committee

in Seoul
- Competitors: 12 in 2 sports
- Flag bearer: Sultan Khalifa
- Medals: Gold 0 Silver 0 Bronze 0 Total 0

Summer Olympics appearances (overview)
- 1984; 1988; 1992; 1996; 2000; 2004; 2008; 2012; 2016; 2020; 2024

The United Arab Emirates competed at the 1988 Summer Olympics in Seoul, South Korea. Twelve competitors, all men, took part in fifteen events in two sports.

== Competitors ==
The following is the list of number of competitors in the Games.

Sport	Men	Women	Total
Cycling	6	0	6
Swimming	6	0	6
Total	12	0	12

== Cycling ==
Six cyclists represented the United Arab Emirates in 1988.

Men's road race

- Sultan Khalifa – 4:44:37 (→ 101st place)
- Khalifa Bin Omair – did not finish (→ no ranking)
- Issa Mohamed – did not finish (→ no ranking)

Men's team time trial

- Ali Al-Abed
- Ali Hayyaz
- Sultan Khalifa
- Naji Sayed

== Swimming ==
Men's 50 m Freestyle

- Ahmad Faraj
  1. Heat – 26.60 (→ did not advance, 63rd place)
- Mubarak Farajbilal
  1. Heat – 27.60 (→ did not advance, 68th place)

Men's 100 m Freestyle

- Mohammed Binabid
  1. Heat – 58.81 (→ did not advance, 72nd place)
- Ahmad Faraj
  1. Heat – 59.10 (→ did not advance, 73rd place)

Men's 200 m Freestyle

- Mohammed Binabid
  1. Heat – 2:09.43 (→ did not advance, 61st place)
- Ahmad Faraj
  1. Heat – 2:13.21 (→ did not advance, 62nd place)

Men's 400 m Freestyle

- Bassam Alansari
  1. Heat – 4:39.36 (→ did not advance, 47th place)
- Mohammed Binabid
  1. Heat – 4:47.28 (→ did not advance, 49th place)

Men's 100 m Backstroke

- Mohamed Abdullah
  1. Heat – 1:08.91 (→ did not advance, 49th place)
- Mohammed Binabid
  1. Heat – 1:10.01 (→ did not advance, 51st place)

Men's 200 m Backstroke

- Mohamed Abdullah
  1. Heat – 2:29.64 (→ did not advance, 39th place)
- Mohammed Binabid
  1. Heat – 2:36.21 (→ did not advance, 40th place)

Men's 100 m Breaststroke

- Obaid Alrumaithi
  1. Heat – 1:17.01 (→ did not advance, 60th place)

Men's 200 m Breaststroke

- Obaid Alrumaithi
  1. Heat – 2:50.49 (→ did not advance, 52nd place)

Men's 100 m Butterfly

- Mohammed Binabid
  1. Heat – 1:06.25 (→ did not advance, 49th place)

Men's 200 m Individual Medley

- Mohammed Binabid
  1. Heat – 2:29.08 (→ did not advance, 53rd place)
- Mohamed Abdullah
  1. Heat – 2:31.44 (→ did not advance, 55th place)

Men's 4 × 100 m Freestyle Relay

- Ahmad Faraj, Mohamed Abdullah, Bassam Alansari, and Mohammed Binabid
  1. Heat – 3:58.92 (→ did not advance, 19th place)

Men's 4 × 200 m Freestyle Relay

- Ahmad Faraj, Mohamed Abdullah, Bassam Alansari, and Mohammed Binabid
  1. Heat – 9:01.03 (→ did not advance, 14th place)

Men's 4 × 100 m Medley Relay

- Mohamed Abdullah, Obaid Alrumaithi, Mohammed Binabid, and Ahmad Faraj
  1. Heat – 4:28.55 (→ did not advance, 25th place)
