= United Arab Emirates at the 2020 Summer Olympics =

- Flag of the United Arab Emirates
- IOC code: UAE
- NOC: United Arab Emirates National Olympic Committee
- Website: olympic.ae (in Arabic)

in Tokyo, Japan July 23, 2021 – August 8, 2021
- Competitors: 5 in 4 sports
- Flag bearer (opening): Yousuf Al-Matrooshi
- Flag bearer (closing): N/A
- Medals: Gold 0 Silver 0 Bronze 0 Total 0

Summer Olympics appearances (overview)
- 1984; 1988; 1992; 1996; 2000; 2004; 2008; 2012; 2016; 2020; 2024

United Arab Emirates competed at the 2020 Summer Olympics in Tokyo. Originally scheduled to take place during the summer of 2020, the Games were postponed to 23 July to 8 August 2021, due to the COVID-19 pandemic. This was the nation's tenth consecutive appearance at the Summer Olympics.

== Competitors ==
The following is a list of the number of competitors in the Games.

Sport	Men	Women	Total
Athletics	1	0	1
Judo	2	0	2
Shooting	1	0	1
Swimming	1	0	1
Total	5	0	5

== Athletics ==
United Arab Emirates received universality slots from the World Athletics to send a male track and field athlete to the Olympics.

Key

- Note–Ranks given for track events are within the athlete's heat only
- Q = Qualified for the next round
- q = Qualified for the next round as a fastest loser or, in field events, by position without achieving the qualifying target
- NR = National record
- N/A = Round not applicable for the event
- Bye = Athlete not required to compete in round

Track & road events

Athlete	Event	Heat		Quarterfinal		Semifinal		Final	
Athlete	Event	Result	Rank	Result	Rank	Result	Rank	Result	Rank
Mohammed Al-Hamadi	Men's 100 m	10.59 PB	3 Q	10.64	8	Did not advance			

== Judo ==
United Arab Emirates entered two male judoka into the Olympic tournament based on the International Judo Federation Olympics Individual Ranking.

Athlete	Event	Round of 32	Round of 16	Quarterfinals	Semifinals	Repechage	Final / BM	
Athlete	Event	Opposition Result	Opposition Result	Opposition Result	Opposition Result	Opposition Result	Opposition Result	Rank
Victor Scvortov	Men's −73 kg	Macias (SWE); L 01–10	Did not advance					
Ivan Remarenco	Men's −100 kg	El Nahas (CAN); L 00–10	Did not advance					

== Shooting ==
United Arab Emirates entered one shooter at the games, after getting the allocation quotas.

Athlete	Event	Qualification		Final	
Athlete	Event	Points	Rank	Points	Rank
Saif Bin Futtais	Men's skeet	117	24	Did not advance	

== Swimming ==
United Arab Emirates received a universality invitation from FINA to send a male top-ranked swimmer in his respective individual events to the Olympics, based on the FINA Points System of June 28, 2021.

Athlete	Event	Heat		Semifinal		Final	
Athlete	Event	Time	Rank	Time	Rank	Time	Rank
Yousuf Al-Matrooshi	Men's 100 m freestyle	51.50	50	Did not advance			
