= United Arab Emirates at the 2024 World Aquatics Championships =

- Flag of the United Arab Emirates
- FINA code: UAE
- National federation: UAE Swimming Federation
- Website: uaeswimming.com

in Doha, Qatar
- Competitors: 4 in 1 sport
- Medals: Gold 0 Silver 0 Bronze 0 Total 0

World Aquatics Championships appearances
- 1994; 1998; 2001; 2003; 2005; 2007; 2009; 2011; 2013; 2015; 2017; 2019; 2022; 2023; 2024

United Arab Emirates competed at the 2024 World Aquatics Championships in Doha, Qatar from 2 to 18 February.

== Competitors ==
The following is the list of competitors in the Championships.

Sport	Men	Women	Total
Swimming	2	2	4
Total	2	2	4

== Swimming ==
United Arab Emirates entered 4 swimmers.

Men

Athlete	Event	Heat		Semifinal		Final	
Athlete	Event	Time	Rank	Time	Rank	Time	Rank
Omar Al-Hammadi	50 metre breaststroke	31.16	47	Did not advance			
Omar Al-Hammadi	100 metre breaststroke	1:08.23	63	Did not advance			
Yousuf Al-Matrooshi	50 metre freestyle	23.44	47	Did not advance			
Yousuf Al-Matrooshi	100 metre freestyle	50.49	37	Did not advance			

Women

Athlete	Event	Heat		Semifinal		Final	
Athlete	Event	Time	Rank	Time	Rank	Time	Rank
Sara Akasha	200 metre freestyle	2:17.90	46	Did not advance			
Sara Akasha	100 metre butterfly	1:11.72	41	Did not advance			
Mira Al-Shehhi	100 metre freestyle	1:04.17	68	Did not advance			
Mira Al-Shehhi	50 metre butterfly	30.82	47	Did not advance			
