= United Arab Emirates at the 2000 Summer Olympics =

- Flag of the United Arab Emirates
- IOC code: UAE
- NOC: United Arab Emirates National Olympic Committee
- Website: www.uaenoc.ae (in Arabic and English)

in Sydney
- Competitors: 4 in 3 sports
- Flag bearer: Sheikh Saeed Al-Maktoum
- Medals: Gold 0 Silver 0 Bronze 0 Total 0

Summer Olympics appearances (overview)
- 1984; 1988; 1992; 1996; 2000; 2004; 2008; 2012; 2016; 2020; 2024

The United Arab Emirates was represented at the 2000 Summer Olympics in Sydney, New South Wales, Australia by the United Arab Emirates National Olympic Committee.

In total, four athletes – all men – represented the United Arab Emirates in three different sports including athletics, shooting and swimming.

== Competitors ==
In total, four athletes represented the United Arab Emirates at the 2000 Summer Olympics in Sydney, New South Wales, Australia across three different sports.

Sport	Men	Women	Total
Athletics	1	0	1
Shooting	2	0	2
Swimming	1	0	1
Total	4	0	4

== Athletics ==
In total, one Emirati athlete participated in the athletics events – Ali Khamis Rashid Al-Neyadi in the men's 200 m.

The heats for the men's 200 m took place on 27 September 2000. Al-Neyadi finished seventh in his heat in a time of 21.93 seconds. He did not advance to the quarter-finals.

== Shooting ==
In total, two Emirati athletes participated in the shooting events – Ahmed Al-Maktoum in the men's trap and the men's double trap and Saeed bin Maktoum bin Rashid Al Maktoum in the men's skeet.

The preliminary round for the men's trap took place on 16 September 2000. Ahmed Al-Maktoum scored 111 across the five rounds. He did not advance to the final and finished joint 18th overall.

The men's double trap took place on 20 September 2000. In the preliminary round, Ahmed Al-Maktoum scored 120 across the three rounds. He did not advance to the final and finished joint 23rd overall.

The preliminary round for the men's skeet took place on 22 September 2000. Saeed bin Maktoum bin Rashid Al Maktoum scored 122 across the five rounds. He did not advance to the final and finished joint ninth overall.

== Swimming ==
In total, one Emirati athlete participated in the swimming events – Ayoub Al-Mas in the men's 50 m freestyle.

The heats for the men's 50 m freestyle took place on 21 September 2000. Al-Mas finished fourth in his heat in a time of 24.91 seconds which was ultimately not fast enough to advance to the semi-finals.
