= United Arab Emirates at the 2023 World Aquatics Championships =

- Flag of the United Arab Emirates
- FINA code: UAE
- National federation: UAE Swimming Federation
- Website: uaeswimming.com

in Fukuoka, Japan
- Competitors: 2 in 1 sport
- Medals: Gold 0 Silver 0 Bronze 0 Total 0

World Aquatics Championships appearances
- 1994; 1998; 2001; 2003; 2005; 2007; 2009; 2011; 2013; 2015; 2017; 2019; 2022; 2023; 2024

United Arab Emirates is set to compete at the 2023 World Aquatics Championships in Fukuoka, Japan from 14 to 30 July.

== Swimming ==
United Arab Emirates entered 2 swimmers.

Men

Athlete	Event	Heat		Semifinal		Final	
Athlete	Event	Time	Rank	Time	Rank	Time	Rank
Yousuf Al-Matrooshi	100 metre freestyle	51.46	65	Did not advance			
Yousuf Al-Matrooshi	100 metre butterfly	56.05	58	Did not advance			
Salem Sabt	50 metre butterfly	25.95	67	Did not advance			
Salem Sabt	200 metre butterfly	Did not start		Did not advance			
