= United Arab Emirates at the 1996 Summer Olympics =

- Flag of the United Arab Emirates
- IOC code: UAE
- NOC: United Arab Emirates National Olympic Committee
- Website: www.uaenoc.ae (in Arabic and English)

in Atlanta
- Competitors: 4 in 4 sports
- Flag bearer: Nabil Tahlak
- Medals: Gold 0 Silver 0 Bronze 0 Total 0

Summer Olympics appearances (overview)
- 1984; 1988; 1992; 1996; 2000; 2004; 2008; 2012; 2016; 2020; 2024

The United Arab Emirates competed at the 1996 Summer Olympics in Atlanta, United States.
