= United Arab Emirates at the 2004 Summer Olympics =

- Flag of the United Arab Emirates
- IOC code: UAE
- NOC: United Arab Emirates National Olympic Committee
- Website: www.uaenoc.ae (in Arabic and English)

in Athens
- Competitors: 4 in 3 sports
- Flag bearer: Saeed Al Maktoum
- Medals Ranked 54th: Gold 1 Silver 0 Bronze 0 Total 1

Summer Olympics appearances (overview)
- 1984; 1988; 1992; 1996; 2000; 2004; 2008; 2012; 2016; 2020; 2024

The United Arab Emirates competed at the 2004 Summer Olympics in Athens, Greece, from 13 to 29 August 2004. This was the nation's sixth consecutive appearance at the Olympics.

The United Arab Emirates National Olympic Committee sent a total of four men to the Games. Skeet shooter Saeed Al Maktoum reprised his role as the nation's flag bearer for the second time in the opening ceremony.

United Arab Emirates left Athens with its first Olympic gold medal in history. It was officially awarded to Al Maktoum's brother Ahmed in men's double trap shooting.

== Medalists ==
Medal	Name	Sport	Event	Date
Gold	Ahmed Al Maktoum	Shooting	Men's double trap	August 17

== Athletics ==
Emirati athletes have so far achieved qualifying standards in the following athletics events (up to a maximum of 3 athletes in each event at the 'A' Standard, and 1 at the 'B' Standard).

Men

Athlete	Event	Heat		Semifinal		Final	
Athlete	Event	Result	Rank	Result	Rank	Result	Rank
Ali Mohammed Al-Balooshi	800 m	1:51.76	8	Did not advance			

== Shooting ==
Men

Athlete	Event	Qualification		Final	
Athlete	Event	Points	Rank	Points	Rank
Ahmed Al Maktoum	Trap	121	=4 Q	144	4
Ahmed Al Maktoum	Double trap	144 OR	1 Q	189 =OR	1st place, gold medalist(s)
Saeed Al Maktoum	Skeet	114	37	Did not advance	

== Swimming ==
Men

Athlete	Event	Heat		Semifinal		Final	
Athlete	Event	Time	Rank	Time	Rank	Time	Rank
Obaid Al Jasmi	100 m freestyle	54.17	58	Did not advance			

== See also ==
- United Arab Emirates at the 2002 Asian Games
- United Arab Emirates at the 2004 Summer Paralympics
