= United Arab Emirates at the 2022 World Aquatics Championships =

- Flag of the United Arab Emirates
- FINA code: UAE
- National federation: UAE Swimming Federation
- Website: www.uaeswimming.com

in Budapest, Hungary
- Competitors: 2 in 1 sport
- Medals: Gold 0 Silver 0 Bronze 0 Total 0

World Aquatics Championships appearances
- 1994; 1998; 2001; 2003; 2005; 2007; 2009; 2011; 2013; 2015; 2017; 2019; 2022; 2023; 2024

United Arab Emirates competed at the 2022 World Aquatics Championships in Budapest, Hungary from 17 June to 3 July.

== Swimming ==
United Arab Emirates entered two swimmers.

Men

Athlete	Event	Heat		Semifinal		Final	
Athlete	Event	Time	Rank	Time	Rank	Time	Rank
Yousuf Al-Matrooshi	100 m freestyle	51.58	59	did not advance			
Yousuf Al-Matrooshi	100 m butterfly	55.37	49	did not advance			
Salem Sabt	200 m freestyle	1:56.40	52	did not advance			
Salem Sabt	200 m butterfly	2:08.21	39	did not advance			
