= List of Emirati records in swimming =

The UAE Records in swimming are the fastest times ever swum by a swimmer from the United Arab Emirates. These records are kept by the UAE Swimming Federation.

The federation maintains records for both long course (50m) and short course (25m) competition, for males, in the following events:

- freestyle: 50, 100, 200, 400, 800 and 1500;
- backstroke: 50, 100 and 200;
- breastroke: 50, 100 and 200;
- butterfly: 50, 100 and 200;
- individual medley (or "IM"): 100 (25m only), 200 and 400;
- relays: 4×100 free, 4×200 free, and 4×100 medley

== Long course (50m) ==
=== Men ===
| Event | Time | | Name | Club | Date | Meet | Location | Ref |
|---|---|---|---|---|---|---|---|---|
| 50 m freestyle | 22.59 | | Hussein Shawky | United Arab Emirates | 21 July 2026 | Asian Age Group Championships | Samutprakan, Thailand | |
| 100 m freestyle | 50.39 | h | Yousuf Al-Matrooshi | United Arab Emirates | 30 July 2024 | Olympic Games | Paris, France | |
| 200 m freestyle | 1:49.96 | | Rohayem Tolba | Hamilton Aquatics Dubai | 2 April 2026 | Dubai International Aquatic Championships | Dubai, United Arab Emirates | |
| 400 m freestyle | 3:53.23 | | Rohayem Tolba | Hamilton Aquatics Dubai | 7 February 2026 | Dubai Open Championships | Dubai, United Arab Emirates | |
| 800 m freestyle | 8:09.03 | | Rohayem Tolba | United Arab Emirates | 21 August 2025 | World Junior Championships | Otopeni, Romania | |
| 1500 m freestyle | 15:47.42 | | Rohayem Tolba | United Arab Emirates | 30 August 2025 | Arab Championships | Casablanca, Morocco | |
| 50 m backstroke | 26.62 | | Yaaqoub Al-Saadi | United Arab Emirates | 10 October 2015 | GCC Games | Dammam, Saudi Arabia | |
| 100 m backstroke | 58.37 | | Yaaqoub Al-Saadi | United Arab Emirates | 1 September 2015 | GCC Championships | Doha, Qatar | |
| 200 m backstroke | 2:11.06 | | Rohayem Tolba | Hamilton Aquatics Dubai | 18 February 2024 | Dubai Open Championships | Dubai, United Arab Emirates | |
| 50 m breaststroke | 28.79 | | Mubarak Al-Besher | United Arab Emirates | 26 April 2014 | Dubai International Championships | Dubai, United Arab Emirates | |
| 50 m breaststroke | 28.76 | h, # | Mahmoud Osama | United Arab Emirates | 30 January 2016 | Euro Meet | Luxembourg City, Luxembourg | |
| 100 m breaststroke | 1:03.89 | h | Mahmoud Osama | United Arab Emirates | 29 January 2017 | Euro Meet | Luxembourg City, Luxembourg | |
| 200 m breaststroke | 2:26.28 | | Mubarak Al-Besher | Al Wasl | 21 October 2011 | GCC Games | Isa Town, Bahrain | |
| 50 m butterfly | 24.50 | | Hussein Shawky | United Arab Emirates | 18 July 2026 | Asian Age Group Championships | Samutprakan, Thailand | |
| 100 m butterfly | 55.02 | | Hussein Shawky | Abu Dhabi Aquatics Club | 2 April 2026 | Dubai International Aquatic Championships | Dubai, United Arab Emirates | |
| 200 m butterfly | 2:06.97 | | Salem Ghalib | United Arab Emirates | 17 May 2022 | GCC Games | Kuwait City, Kuwait | |
| 200 m individual medley | 2:10.00 | | Obaid Aljasmi | United Arab Emirates | 1 August 2021 | GCC Championships | Doha, Qatar | |
| 400 m individual medley | 4:45.29 | | Rohayem Tolba | Hamilton Aquatics Dubai | 25 June 2023 | Hamilton Aquatics Summer Sizzler | Dubai, United Arab Emirates | |
| 4×100m freestyle relay | 3:33.51 | | Hussein Shawky (52.01); Rohayem Tolba (52.84); Suhail Yaqoob Al Hanaa (55.96); Eid Almujaini (52.70) | United Arab Emirates | 22 January 2026 | GCC Championships | Abu Dhabi, United Arab Emirates | |
| 4×200m freestyle relay | 7:55.05 | | Rohayem Tolba (1:53.88); Hussein Shawky (1:55.25); Suhail Yaqoob Al Hanaa (2:06.95); Salem Sabt (1:58.97) | United Arab Emirates | 24 January 2026 | GCC Championships | Abu Dhabi, United Arab Emirates | |
| 4×100m medley relay | 3:53.22 | | Rohayem Tolba (58.65); Yousuf Al-Shamsi (1:06.20); Salem Sabt (56.83); Hussein Shawky (51.54) | United Arab Emirates | 25 January 2026 | GCC Championships | Abu Dhabi, United Arab Emirates | |

Legend: # – Record awaiting ratification by UAE Swimming Federation; WR – World record; AS – Asian record;
Records not set in finals: h – heat; sf – semifinal; r – relay 1st leg; rh – relay heat 1st leg; b – B final; † – en route to final mark; so – swim-off; tt – time trial

=== Women ===
| Event | Time | | Name | Club | Date | Meet | Location | Ref |
|---|---|---|---|---|---|---|---|---|
| 50 m freestyle | 27.37 | r | Adaora Opara | Markham Aquatic Club | 12 July 2026 | Ontario Championships | Toronto, Canada | |
| 100 m freestyle | 58.43 | tt | Adaora Opara | Markham Aquatic Club | 6 July 2026 | Canadian Trials | Montreal, Canada | |
| 200 m freestyle | 2:07.67 | | Adaora Opara | Hamilton Aquatics Dubai | 21 June 2026 | Hamilton Aquatics Summer Sizzler | Dubai, United Arab Emirates | |
| 400 m freestyle | 4:36.21 | | Adaora Opara | Hamilton Aquatics Dubai | 22 June 2025 | Hamilton Aquatics Summer Sizzler | Dubai, United Arab Emirates | |
| 800 m freestyle | 9:42.21 | | Adaora Opara | Markham Aquatic Club | 24 July 2025 | MAC Summer Invitational | Unionville, Canada | |
| 1500 m freestyle | | | | | | | | |
| 50 m backstroke | 31.67 | | Judy Mohtadi | High Performance Swimming Club | 2 April 2015 | 12th Arab Age Group Championships | Dubai, United Arab Emirates | |
| 100 m backstroke | 1:11.41 | | Adaora Opara | United Arab Emirates | 24 January 2026 | GCC Championships | Abu Dhabi, United Arab Emirates | |
| 200 m backstroke | 2:31.82 | | Adaora Opara | United Arab Emirates | 23 January 2026 | GCC Championships | Abu Dhabi, United Arab Emirates | |
| 50 m breaststroke | 35.39 | | Yara Almheiri | MY Swim Club Dubai | 7 February 2026 | Dubai Open Championships | Dubai, United Arab Emirates | |
| 100 m breaststroke | 1:17.21 | | Yara Almheiri | Fujairah Swimmung | 4 April 2026 | Dubai International Aquatic Championships | Dubai, United Arab Emirates | |
| 200 m breaststroke | 2:51.42 | | Yara Almheiri | Fujairah Swimmung | 5 April 2026 | Dubai International Aquatic Championships | Dubai, United Arab Emirates | |
| 50 m butterfly | 28.37 | | Adaora Opara | Hamilton Aquatics Dubai | 5 April 2026 | Dubai International Aquatic Championships | Dubai, United Arab Emirates | |
| 100 m butterfly | 1:03.38 | | Adaora Opara | Markham Aquatic Club | 10 July 2026 | Ontario Championships | Toronto, Canada | |
| 200 m butterfly | 2:24.10 | | Adaora Opara | Hamilton Aquatics Dubai | 4 April 2026 | Dubai International Aquatic Championships | Dubai, United Arab Emirates | |
| 200 m individual medley | 2:39.84 | | Yara Almheiri | Fujairah Swimmung | 3 April 2026 | Dubai International Aquatic Championships | Dubai, United Arab Emirates | |
| 400 m individual medley | 5:43.86 | | Yara Almheiri | MY Swim Club Dubai | 8 February 2026 | Dubai Open Championships | Dubai, United Arab Emirates | |
| 4×100 m freestyle relay | 4:22.17 | | Maha Alshehhi (1:03.40); Mira Alshehhi (1:04.62); Ayesha Almheiri (1:11.75); Adaora Opara (1:02.40) | United Arab Emirates | 22 January 2026 | GCC Championships | Abu Dhabi, United Arab Emirates | |
| 4×200 m freestyle relay | 9:38.14 | | Mira Alshehhi (2:20.90); Maha Alshehhi (2:19.79); Adaora Opara (2:19.04); Ayesha Almheiri (2:38.41) | United Arab Emirates | 24 January 2026 | GCC Championships | Abu Dhabi, United Arab Emirates | |
| 4×100 m medley relay | 5:06.99 | | Adaora Opara (1:18.25); Maha Alshehhi (1:26.70); Mira Alshehhi (1:10.39); Ayesha Almheiri (1:11.65) | United Arab Emirates | 25 January 2026 | GCC Championships | Abu Dhabi, United Arab Emirates | |

Legend: # – Record awaiting ratification by UAE Swimming Federation; WR – World record; AS – Asian record;
Records not set in finals: h – heat; sf – semifinal; r – relay 1st leg; rh – relay heat 1st leg; b – B final; † – en route to final mark; so – swim-off; tt – time trial

== Short course (25m) ==
=== Men ===
| Event | Time | | Name | Club | Date | Meet | Location | Ref |
|---|---|---|---|---|---|---|---|---|
| 50 m freestyle | 22.33 | | Hussein Shawky | Hamilton Aquatics Dubai | 6 December 2025 | Speedo Invitational Meet | Dubai, United Arab Emirates | |
| 100 m freestyle | 49.11 | | Yousuf Al-Matrooshi | United Arab Emirates | 27 October 2021 | Arab Championships | Abu Dhabi, United Arab Emirates | |
| 200 m freestyle | 1:45.78 | b | Rohayem Tolba | Hamilton Aquatics | 12 December 2025 | Swim England National Winter Championships | Sheffield, United Kingdom | |
| 400 m freestyle | 3:45.93 | h | Rohayem Tolba | Hamilton Aquatics | 11 December 2025 | Swim England National Winter Championships | Sheffield, United Kingdom | |
| 800 m freestyle | 7:58.20 | | Rohayem Tolba | Hamilton Aquatics | 14 December 2025 | Swim England National Winter Championships | Sheffield, United Kingdom | |
| 1500 m freestyle | 17:20.43 | | Majid Mohamed Al Hammadi | (United Arab Emirates) UAE | February 2009 | GCC Championships | Doha, Qatar | |
| 50 m backstroke | 26.08 | | Mohammed Al Ghaferi | (United Arab Emirates) UAE | 8 October 2011 | World Cup | Dubai, United Arab Emirates | |
| 100 m backstroke | 55.91 | h | Rohayem Tolba | Hamilton Aquatics | 13 December 2025 | Swim England National Winter Championships | Sheffield, United Kingdom | |
| 200 m backstroke | 2:02.08 | | Rohayem Tolba | Hamilton Aquatics Dubai | 20 October 2024 | Hamilton Aquatics Meet | Dubai, United Arab Emirates | |
| 50 m breaststroke | 28.37 | | Mubarak Al-Besher | UAE | 4 February 2015 | GCC Championships | Dubai, United Arab Emirates | |
| 100 m breaststroke | 1:01.66 | | Mubarak Al-Besher | UAE | 5 February 2015 | GCC Championships | Dubai, United Arab Emirates | |
| 200 m breaststroke | 2:22.33 | h | Mubarak Al Besher | (United Arab Emirates) UAE | December 17, 2010 | Short Course Worlds | Dubai, United Arab Emirates | |
| 50 m butterfly | 24.67 | | Hussein Shawky | Hamilton Aquatics Dubai | 24 November 2024 | Speedo Invitational Meet | Dubai, United Arab Emirates | |
| 100 m butterfly | 53.53 | | Yousuf Al-Matrooshi | United Arab Emirates | 24 October 2021 | Arab Championships | Abu Dhabi, United Arab Emirates | |
| 200 m butterfly | 2:03.91 | | Yousuf Al-Matrooshi | United Arab Emirates | 26 October 2021 | Arab Championships | Abu Dhabi, United Arab Emirates | |
| 100 m individual medley | 57.11 | | Obaid Ahmed Al-Gesma | (United Arab Emirates) UAE | 6 March 2011 | GCC Championships | Qatar | |
| 200 m individual medley | 2:05.70 | | Obaid Ahmed Al-Gesma | (United Arab Emirates) UAE | 20 February 2009 | GCC Championships | Doha, Qatar | |
| 400 m individual medley | 4:31.07 | | Rohayem Tolba | Hamilton Aquatics Dubai | 19 October 2024 | Hamilton Aquatics Meet | Dubai, United Arab Emirates | |
| 4x50 m freestyle relay | 1:36.48 | h | Ali Saeed Alkaabi (25.05); Obaid Ahmed Aljasmi; Mubarak Al Besher; Mohamed Jasim Shafee | UAE | 2 July 2013 | Asian Indoor and Martial Arts Games | Incheon, South Korea | |
| 4x100 m freestyle relay | 3:31.19 | | | (United Arab Emirates) UAE | February 2008 | GCC Championships | | |
| 4x200 m freestyle relay | 8:03.02 | h | Obaid Al Jasmi (1:57.74); Mubarak Al Besher (2:01.00); Ali Al Kaabi (2:00.70); Faisal Al Jasmi (2:03.58) | (United Arab Emirates) UAE | December 16, 2010 | Short Course Worlds | Dubai, United Arab Emirates | |
| 4x50 m medley relay | 1:46.11 | h | Ali Saeed Al-Kaabi (27.69); Mubarak Al-Besher; ObaidAhmed Al-Jasmi; Mohamed Jasim Shafee | UAE | 30 June 2013 | Asian Indoor and Martial Arts Games | Incheon, South Korea | |
| 4x100 m medley relay | 3:51.83 | h | Mohammed Al Ghaferi (58.04); Mubarak Al Besher (1:03.56); Bakheet Al Jasmi (57.98); Obaid Al Jasmi (52.25) | (United Arab Emirates) UAE | December 19, 2010 | Short Course Worlds | Dubai, United Arab Emirates | |

Legend: # – Record awaiting ratification by UAE Swimming Federation;
Records not set in finals: h – heat; sf – semifinal; r – relay 1st leg; rh – relay heat 1st leg; b – B final; † – en route to final mark; so – swim-off; tt – time trial
