= United Arab Emirates at the 2013 World Aquatics Championships =

- Flag of the United Arab Emirates
- FINA code: UAE
- National federation: UAE Swimming Federation
- Website: www.uaeswimming.com

in Barcelona, Spain
- Competitors: 2 in 1 sports
- Medals: Gold 0 Silver 0 Bronze 0 Total 0

World Aquatics Championships appearances
- 1994; 1998; 2001; 2003; 2005; 2007; 2009; 2011; 2013; 2015; 2017; 2019; 2022; 2023; 2024

United Arab Emirates competed at the 2013 World Aquatics Championships in Barcelona, Spain between 19 July and 4 August 2013.

== Swimming ==
Emirati swimmers achieved qualifying standards in the following events (up to a maximum of 2 swimmers in each event at the A-standard entry time, and 1 at the B-standard):

Men

Athlete	Event	Heat		Semifinal		Final	
Athlete	Event	Time	Rank	Time	Rank	Time	Rank
Mubarak Al-Besher	50 m breaststroke	29.74	58	did not advance			
Mubarak Al-Besher	100 m breaststroke	1:06.17	60	did not advance			
Yaaqoub Al-Saadi	100 m backstroke	1:02.97	49	did not advance			
Yaaqoub Al-Saadi	200 m backstroke	2:21.51	34	did not advance			
