= United Arab Emirates at the 2017 World Aquatics Championships =

- Flag of the United Arab Emirates
- FINA code: UAE
- National federation: UAE Swimming Federation
- Website: www.uaeswimming.com

in Budapest, Hungary
- Competitors: 1 in 1 sport
- Medals: Gold 0 Silver 0 Bronze 0 Total 0

World Aquatics Championships appearances
- 1994; 1998; 2001; 2003; 2005; 2007; 2009; 2011; 2013; 2015; 2017; 2019; 2022; 2023; 2024

United Arab Emirates competed at the 2017 World Aquatics Championships in Budapest, Hungary from 14 July to 30 July.

== Swimming ==
United Arab Emirates has received a Universality invitation from FINA to send a female swimmer to the World Championships.

Athlete	Event	Heat		Semifinal		Final	
Athlete	Event	Time	Rank	Time	Rank	Time	Rank
Yaaqoub Al-Saadi	Men's 100 m backstroke	DNS		Did not advance			
Yaaqoub Al-Saadi	Men's 50 m butterfly	DNS		Did not advance			
