= United Arab Emirates at the 1984 Summer Olympics =

- Flag of the United Arab Emirates
- IOC code: UAE
- NOC: United Arab Emirates National Olympic Committee

in Los Angeles
- Competitors: 7
- Flag bearer: Mubarak Ismail Amber
- Medals: Gold 0 Silver 0 Bronze 0 Total 0

Summer Olympics appearances (overview)
- 1984; 1988; 1992; 1996; 2000; 2004; 2008; 2012; 2016; 2020; 2024; 2028

The United Arab Emirates competed in the Summer Olympic Games for the first time at the 1984 Summer Olympics held in Los Angeles. Athletes participating included Rashed Jerba, Ibrahim Aziz, Helel Ali, and Shadad Mubarak. Muhammed Samy Abdulla and Khamis Ebrahem also competed.

== Background ==
The United Arab Emirates National Olympic Committee was recognised by the International Olympic Committee (IOC) on 1 January 1980. The nation debuted at the Olympics four years later at these Games. They have never participated in a Winter Olympic Games. The 1984 Summer Olympics were held from 28 July to 12 August 2012; a total of 6800 athletes represented 140 National Olympic Committees (NOC).

== Results by event ==
=== Athletics ===
Men's 400 metres

- Rashed Jerbeh
  - Heat — 48.71 (→ did not advance)

Men's 110 metres hurdles

- Mohamed Helal Ali
  - Heat — 15.75 (→ did not advance)

Men's Long Jump

- Shahad Mubarak
  - Qualification — 6.98m (→ did not advance, 23rd place)
