= United Arab Emirates at the 2024 Summer Olympics =

- Flag of the United Arab Emirates
- IOC code: UAE
- NOC: United Arab Emirates National Olympic Committee
- Website: olympic.ae (in Arabic)

in Paris, France 26 July 2024 – 11 August 2024
- Competitors: 13 (9 men and 4 women) in 5 sports
- Flag bearers: Omar Al Marzouqi & Safia Al-Sayegh
- Medals: Gold 0 Silver 0 Bronze 0 Total 0

Summer Olympics appearances (overview)
- 1984; 1988; 1992; 1996; 2000; 2004; 2008; 2012; 2016; 2020; 2024

United Arab Emirates competed at the 2024 Summer Olympics in Paris from 26 July to 11 August 2024. It was the nation's eleventh consecutive appearance at the Summer Olympics.

The United Arab Emirates failed to secure a single Olympic medal for a second time, the first being in 2020. Aram Grigorian came close to an Olympic podium in the men's 90 kg in judo, but fell short to bronze medalist Theodoros Tselidis of Greece.

== Competitors ==
The following is the list of number of competitors in the Games.

Sport	Men	Women	Total
Athletics	0	1	1
Cycling	0	1	1
Equestrian	3	0	3
Judo	5	1	6
Swimming	1	1	2
Total	9	4	13

== Athletics ==
United Arab Emirates sent one sprinter to compete at the 2024 Summer Olympics.

Key

- Note–Ranks given for track events are within the athlete's heat only
- Q = Qualified for the next round
- q = Qualified for the next round as a fastest loser or, in field events, by position without achieving the qualifying target
- NR = National record
- N/A = Round not applicable for the event
- Bye = Athlete not required to compete in round

Track events

Athlete	Event	Heat		Repechage		Semifinal		Final	
Athlete	Event	Result	Rank	Result	Rank	Result	Rank	Result	Rank
Mariam Kareem	Women's 100 m	13.26	9	Did not advance					

== Cycling ==
=== Road ===
For the first time since 2016, United Arab Emirates entered one female rider to compete in the road race events at the Olympic, through the re-allocation of unused quota places via the establishment of UCI Nation Ranking.

Athlete	Event	Time	Rank
Safia Al-Sayegh	Women's road race	DNF	

== Equestrian ==
For the first time since 2008, United Arab Emirates entered a squad of three jumping riders into the Olympic equestrian competition by securing the last of two available team spots at the International Equestrian Federation (FEI)-designated Olympic qualifier for Group F (Africa and Middle East) in Doha, Qatar.

=== Jumping ===
Athlete	Horse	Event	Qualification		Final		
Athlete	Horse	Event	Penalties	Rank	Penalties	Time	Rank
Ali Hamad Ali-Kirbi	Jarlin de Torres	Individual	16.61	61	Did not advance		
Abdullah Mohd Al-Marri	McGregor	Individual	Retired				
Omar Abdul Aziz Al-Marzooqi	Enjoy de la Mure	Individual	1.00	21 Q	8.00	83.38	19
Ali Hamad Al-Kirbi; Abdullah Mohd Al-Marri; Omar Abdul Aziz Al-Marzooqi	See above	Team	72	18	Did not advance		

Reserve is Salim Ahmed Al-Suwaidi on Foncetti VD Heffinck

== Judo ==
United Arab Emirates qualified six judokas for the following weight classes at the Games. Bayanmönkhiin Narmandakh (men's half-lightweight, 66 kg), Nugzar Tatalashvili (men's half-middleweight, 81 kg), Aram Grigorian (men's middleweight, 90 kg), Dzhafar Kostoev (men's half-heavyweight, 100 kg), Magomedomar Magomedomarov (men's heavyweight, +100 kg) and Bishreltiin Khorloodoi (women's half-lightweight, 52 kg), got qualified via quota based on IJF World Ranking List and continental quota based on Olympic point rankings.

Athlete	Event	Round of 64	Round of 32	Round of 16	Quarterfinals	Semifinals	Repechage	Final / BM	
Athlete	Event	Opposition Result	Opposition Result	Opposition Result	Opposition Result	Opposition Result	Opposition Result	Opposition Result	Rank
Bayanmönkhiin Narmandakh	Men's –66 kg	—	Ba-ul (KOR); L 00–10	Did not advance					
Nugzar Tatalashvili	Men's –81 kg	Bye	Gandía (PUR); L 00–11	Did not advance					
Aram Grigorian	Men's –90 kg	—	Bobonov (UZB); W 10–00	Nyman (SWE); W 10–00	Murao (JPN); L 00–10	—	Tselidis (GRE); L 00–10	Did not advance	
Dzhafar Kostoev	Men's –100 kg	—	Gonçalves (BRA); W 10–01	Korrel (NED); L 00–01	Did not advance				
Magomedomar Magomedomarov	Men's +100 kg	—	Mehdi Lili (ALG); W 10–00	Riner (FRA); L 00–10	Did not advance				
Bishreltiin Khorloodoi	Women's –52 kg	—	Yeqing (CHN); W 10–00	Ballhaus (GER); L 00–11	Did not advance				

== Swimming ==
United Arab Emirates sent two swimmers to compete at the 2024 Paris Olympics.

Athlete	Event	Heat		Semifinal		Final	
Athlete	Event	Time	Rank	Time	Rank	Time	Rank
Yousuf Al-Matrooshi	Men's 100 m freestyle	50.39	44	Did not advance			
Maha Al-Shehhi	Women's 200 m freestyle	2:17.17	28	Did not advance			

== See also ==
- United Arab Emirates at the 2024 Winter Youth Olympics
