= Abdullah Sultan =

Abdullah Sultan or Abdullah bin Sultan is an Arabic name, consisting of two given names, Abdullah and Sultan, in terms of patronymic name, it means Abdullah Son of Sultan and not to be confused with Abdullah Al-Sultan (below), may refer to:

- Abdulla Sultan Al Nasseri (born 1986), footballer from UAE
- Abdullah Ali Sultan (born 1963), footballer from UAE
- Abdullah Sultan (swimmer) (born 1973), swimmer for UAE
