= United Arab Emirates at the Olympics =

- Flag of the United Arab Emirates
- IOC code: UAE
- NOC: United Arab Emirates National Olympic Committee
- Website: www.uaenoc.ae (in Arabic and English)
- Medals Ranked 113th: Gold 1 Silver 0 Bronze 1 Total 2

Summer appearances
- 1984; 1988; 1992; 1996; 2000; 2004; 2008; 2012; 2016; 2020; 2024; 2028

The United Arab Emirates National Olympic Committee was formed in 1979. They were recognized by the IOC in 1980. The United Arab Emirates have competed in 11 Summer Olympic Games since its debut in 1984. The nation has participated for the first time at the Winter Olympic Games in 2026.

The United Arab Emirates won their first medal at the 2004 Summer Olympics in Greece. Sharpshooter HH Sheikh Ahmed Al-Maktoum clinched the top position in the men's double trap event.

Sergiu Toma, a Moldovan-born judoka moved to the UAE after the 2012 Olympics, winning a bronze medal in judo for the UAE at the Rio Olympics in 2016.

HH Sheikha Maitha bint Mohammed bin Rashid Al Maktoum made history at the 2008 Beijing Olympics as the first woman to carry the UAE flag. Competing in women's taekwondo (welterweight), she placed 7th.

== Medal tables ==
=== Medals by Summer Games ===
Games	Athletes	Gold	Silver	Bronze	Total	Rank
1984 Los Angeles	7	0	0	0	0	–
1988 Seoul	12	0	0	0	0	–
1992 Barcelona	13	0	0	0	0	–
1996 Atlanta	4	0	0	0	0	–
2000 Sydney	4	0	0	0	0	–
2004 Athens	4	1	0	0	1	54
2008 Beijing	8	0	0	0	0	–
2012 London	26	0	0	0	0	–
2016 Rio de Janeiro	13	0	0	1	1	78
2020 Tokyo	5	0	0	0	0	–
2024 Paris	13	0	0	0	0	–
2028 Los Angeles	future event					
2032 Brisbane	future event					
Total		1	0	1	2	113

=== Medals by Winter Games ===
Games	Athletes	Gold	Silver	Bronze	Total	Rank
2026 Milano Cortina	2	0	0	0	0	–
2030 French Alps	future event					
2034 Utah	future event					
Total		0	0	0	0	–

=== Medals by summer sport ===
Sport	Gold	Silver	Bronze	Total
Shooting	1	0	0	1
Judo	0	0	1	1
Totals (2 entries)	1	0	1	2

== List of medalists ==
Medal	Name	Games	Sport	Event
Gold	Ahmed Al Maktoum	2004 Athens	Shooting	Men's double trap
Bronze	Sergiu Toma	2016 Rio de Janeiro	Judo	Men's 81 kg

== See also ==
- List of flag bearers for United Arab Emirates at the Olympics
- United Arab Emirates at the Paralympics
