= Khadija Mohammed =

Emirati weightlifter

Khadija Mohammad (Arabic: خديجة محمد; born 19 June 1995 in Dubai, United Arab Emirates) is an Emirati weightlifter and the first female lifter from the Gulf at the Olympics. She competed at the 2012 Summer Olympics in the -75 kg event and finished in 9th place.

== Early sporting life ==
Before turning to weightlifting, Khadija initially played handball, showcasing her athletic abilities early on. Her transition to weightlifting came only about a year to a year and a half before the 2012 Olympics - a remarkably short period in which to prepare for the world's most prestigious sporting event.

Despite her limited experience, Khadija’s determination and rapid progress allowed her to qualify based on her own merit and not through a wildcard invitation, a fact that highlights the significance of her achievement.

=== Olympic Debut at London 2012 ===
At just 17 years old, Khadija represented the UAE in the 75 kg women’s weightlifting event at the London 2012 Olympics, competing against six other athletes from various countries. Although she finished last in her category, her participation marked a symbolic and inspirational moment for female athletes in the region.

Her performance in the competition was as follows:

Snatch:

First attempt: 47 kg – successful

Second attempt: 51 kg – successful

Third attempt: 53 kg – failed

Clean and Jerk:

First attempt: 53 kg – successful

Second attempt: 58 kg – successful

Third attempt: 62 kg – successful

While her total was significantly lower than the top lifters in the field—some lifting nearly 86 kg or more in individual categories—her presence alone carried immense symbolic value.

=== Qualification ===
Khadija’s qualification journey included participation in several regional and continental competitions:

- The Arab Weightlifting Championships in Morocco
- The Asian Championships held in South Korea in 2012

It was during the Asian Championship that the UAE women’s weightlifting team ranked fifth overall, with Khadija earning the highest individual score among her teammates. This achievement secured her qualification for the London Olympics.

== Symbol in Emirati Sports ==
According to officials from the UAE Weightlifting Federation, Khadija’s Olympic participation was not aimed at winning medals, but rather to gain experience and exposure to high-level competition, and to represent Emirati women on the international stage. The federation emphasized that her involvement was a step toward developing the sport among women in the UAE, where competitive weightlifting was still in its infancy.

Her Olympic appearance opened doors and inspired a new generation of Emirati female athletes, signaling a shift in the nation's sporting culture and paving the way for more inclusive participation in traditionally male-dominated sports.

== Legacy and impact ==
Though Khadija Mohammed did not win a medal in London, her participation alone was a historic milestone. She became a role model for young women across the UAE and the Arab world, demonstrating that ambition and perseverance can break barriers.

Today, her name is often cited among pioneers in Emirati sports, and her journey continues to inspire efforts to promote gender equality in athletics, especially in disciplines like weightlifting that require strength, discipline, and mental toughness.
