= Ali Hamad Al-Kirbi =

U.A.E. equestrian

Personal information
- Born: 21 June 2001 (age 25) Sharjah, United Arab Emirates

Sport
- Country: United Arab Emirates
- Sport: Equestrian
- Event: Show jumping

Ali Hamad Al-Kirbi (born 21 June 2001 in Sharjah, United Arab Emirates) is an equestrian who rides for the United Arab Emirates in show jumping.

He represented United Arab Emirates at the 2024 Paris Olympics, where he finished 18th in the team competition.
