= IWF Arab Championships =

- Location: Middle East and North Africa
- Organised by: Arabic Weightlifting Federation, IWF

The IWF Arab Championships Is an annual Olympic Weightlifting competition held in different countries each year. The championships are organized by the Arabic Weightlifting Association and includes participation of 19 countries.

== Host Countries ==
| Year | Location |
|---|---|
| 2018 | Cairo, Egypt |
| 2019 | Amman, Jordan |
| 2023 | Damascus, Syria |
