= Adil Mohammad =

Emirati sailor

Personal information
- Full name: Adil Khalid Mohammad
- Nationality: United Arab Emirates
- Born: 8 October 1988 (age 38) Dubai, United Arab Emirates
- Height: 1.67 m (5 ft 6 in)
- Weight: 75 kg (165 lb)

Sailing career
- Sport: Sailing
- Club: Emirates Sailing School
- Coached by: Omar Mohamed Bazara
- Class: Dinghy

Adil Khalid Mohammad (Arabic: عادل خالد محمد; born 8 October 1988 in Dubai) is an Emirati sailor, who specialized in the Laser class. Mohammad became the first and only Emirati sailor to represent his country at the Olympic Games, where he finished forty-second in his respective category at Beijing 2008. Mohammed trained at the Emirates Sailing School in his native Dubai, under head coach Omar Mohamed Bazara.

Mohammed qualified for his nation's Olympic sailing debut in the Laser class at the 2008 Summer Olympics in Beijing by granting a tripartite invitation from the International Sailing Federation and the International Olympic Committee. Despite producing his best performance of the Games by finishing eleventh in the fifth race, Mohammad strived his relentless effort to obtain the penultimate position in a fleet of forty-three sailors at the end of the eleven-race series with 272 net points.
