= Nabil Abdul Tahlak =

Emirati sports shooter

Personal information
- Nationality: Emirati
- Born: 10 July 1957 (age 68)

Sport
- Sport: Shooting

Nabil Abdul Tahlak (born 10 July 1957) is an Emirati shooter. He competed in the 1996 Summer Olympics. He was the flag bearer for the United Arab Emirates in the opening ceremony.
