= Obaid Al-Jasmi =

Emirati swimmer

Obaid al-jasmi
Personal information
- Full name: Obaid Ahmed Obaid Al-Jasmi
- Born: July 29, 1981 (age 44) Abu Dhabi, UAE

Sport
- Sport: Swimming

Obaid Al Jasmi, last name sometime spelled "Jasimi", (born August 9, 1981 in Abu Dhabi, United Arab Emirates) is a swimmer from the United Arab Emirates. He swam for the UAE at the 2004 and 2008 Olympics. As of March 2012, he is attempting to qualify for his third Olympics.

He has swum for the UAE at:

- Olympics: 2004 and 2008
- World Championships: 2007, 2009, 2011
- Asian Games: 2010
- Short Course Worlds: 2010

Obaid and three of his brothers all swam at the 2010 Short Course Worlds in Dubai, UAE.
