= Arabic Weightlifting Federation =

Governing body of Olympic Weightlifting in the Middle East and Northern Africa

- Sport: Olympic Weightlifting
- Jurisdiction: Middle East and North Africa
- Membership: 19
- Abbreviation: AWF
- Affiliation: International Weightlifting Federation
- President: Mohamed Yousef Al Mana
- Vice president(s): Ibrahim Harb, Mohamed Kadum, Mahmoud Kamal Mahgoub, Abdulbaset Salem Alhaddad
- Secretary: Mohamed Jaloud

The Arabic Weightlifting Federation (AWF) is the governing body of Olympic Weightlifting for 19 countries in the Middle East and North Africa. The AWF organizes the IWF Arab Championships.

== Governance ==
Position	Name	Country	Elected	Additional Responsibilities
President	Mohamed Yousef Al Mana	Qatar	2019	
General Secretary	Mohamed Jaloud	Iraq	2019	
Vice President	Ibrahim Harb	Jordan	2016	
Vice President	Mohamed Kadum	Iraq	2016	
Vice President	Mahmoud Kamal Mahgoub	Egypt	2016	
Vice President	Abdulbaset Salem Alhaddad	Libya	2016	
Executive Board Member	Aziz Brahimi	Algeria	2016	
Executive Board Member	Ali Ben Faddel	Tunisia	2016	
Executive Board Member	Mohamed El Harbi	Saudi Arabia	2016	
Executive Board Member	Said El Gabshi	Oman	2016	
Executive Board Member	Khaloud Ubeed	United Arab Emirates	2016	Women Commission Chairperson
Executive Board Member	Abdullah Al Jarmal	Yemen	2016	Assistant to the President
Executive Board Member	Ahmed Sehnaoui	Morocco	2016	Deputy General Secretary
