= Abdullah Sultan (swimmer) =

Emirati swimmer

Personal information
- Born: 14 March 1973 (age 53)

Sport
- Sport: Swimming

Abdullah Sultan (born 14 March 1973) is an Emirati swimmer. He competed in four events at the 1992 Summer Olympics.
