= Nada Al-Bedwawi =

Emirati swimmer (born 1997)

Personal information
- Full name: Nada Mohamed Abdulzaher Mohamed Al-Bedwawi
- Born: August 15, 1997 (age 28)

Sport
- Sport: Swimming

Nada Mohamed Abdulzaher Mohamed Al-Bedwawi (born August 15, 1997) is an Emirati swimmer. She competed at the 2016 Summer Olympics in the women's 50 metre freestyle event; her time of 33.42 seconds in the heats did not qualify her for the semifinals. She was the first female Olympic swimmer from the United Arab Emirates and was the country's flag bearer at the Parade of Nations.

Olympic Games
Preceded by Saeed bin Maktoum bin Rashid Al Maktoum	Flagbearer for United Arab Emirates; Rio de Janeiro 2016	Succeeded by Incumbent
