= Mohamed Bin Abid =

Emirati swimmer (born 1969)

Personal information
- Born: 4 March 1969 (age 57)

Sport
- Sport: Swimming

Mohamed Bin Abid (born 4 March 1969) is an Emirati swimmer. He competed at the 1988 Summer Olympics and the 1992 Summer Olympics.
