= Ahmad Faraj =

Emirati swimmer

Personal information
- Born: 6 March 1966 (age 60)

Sport
- Sport: Swimming

Ahmad Faraj (born 6 March 1966) is an Emirati swimmer. He competed at the 1988 Summer Olympics and the 1992 Summer Olympics.
