= Saeed bin Maktoum bin Rashid Al Maktoum =

Emirati sport shooter and royal

- Sheikh
- Born: 1 October 1976 (age 50)
- Spouse: Zeynab Javadli (m. 2015; div. 2019)
- Issue: 3
Names
- Sheikh Saeed bin Maktoum bin Rashid bin Saeed bin Maktoum bin Hasher bin Maktoum bin Butti bin Suhail Al Maktoum
- House: Al Maktoum
- Father: Maktoum bin Rashid Al Maktoum
- Mother: Alia bint Khalifa Al Maktoum
- Religion: Islam

Sheikh Saeed bin Maktoum bin Rashid Al Maktoum (Arabic: سعيد بن مكتوم بن راشد آل مكتوم; born 1 October 1976) is an Emirati royal and former sport shooter who represented the United Arab Emirates in men's skeet at five Olympic Games between 2000 and 2016. He is a member of the Al Maktoum family, the ruling family of Dubai, and is a son of Maktoum bin Rashid Al Maktoum, the former ruler of Dubai. His uncle is the current ruler of Dubai, Mohammed bin Rashid Al Maktoum.

== Sport shooting career ==
Sheikh Saeed represented the UAE at the 2000, 2004, 2008, 2012 and 2016 Olympics in skeet shooting. According to the International Shooting Sport Federation, he began competing in shooting in 1995 and has competed in trap and skeet events. Coached by Lithuanian shooter Leonas Molotokas, he also competed at the 2006 Asian Games and 2007 Pan Arab Games.

In 2006, he won the Asian Shooting Championships in skeet.

In 2010, he won the 9th Arab Shooting Championship at the Fahad Al Ahmed Complex in Kuwait.

In 2011, he won the men's skeet title at the ISSF World Cup Final in Al Ain, scoring 146 out of 150 targets. He also won gold in individual skeet at the 2011 Arab Games in Doha, Qatar.

== Other sports ==
Sheikh Saeed has been involved in horse racing as an owner. His horses included Lammtarra, who raced in Sheikh Saeed's colours before competing under the Godolphin banner.

He sponsored the 1000 Dunes Rally in 2008.

== Marriage and custody dispute ==
Sheikh Saeed bin Maktoum bin Rashid Al Maktoum married Azerbaijani former gymnast Zeynab Javadli in 2015. The couple divorced in 2019 and subsequently became involved in a custody dispute concerning their three daughters.

According to Sheikh Saeed's legal representatives, custody of the children was awarded to him in 2022 and the decision was subsequently upheld by a higher court in Dubai.

On 4 June 2026, Dubai Public Prosecution stated that Javadli had been taken into custody following a complaint filed by Sheikh Saeed alleging that she had abducted the children during a court-approved visitation session. Prosecutors stated that the matter remained under investigation and subject to ongoing legal proceedings.

Olympic Games
Preceded by Maitha Al-Maktoum	Flagbearer for United Arab Emirates; London 2012	Succeeded by Nada Al-Bedwawi
