= United Arab Emirates at the 2011 World Aquatics Championships =

Sporting event delegation

Flag of the United Arab Emirates

United Arab Emirates competed at the 2011 World Aquatics Championships in Shanghai, China between July 16 and 31, 2011.

== Swimming ==
United Arab Emirates qualified 2 swimmers.

Men

Athlete	Event	Heats		Semifinals		Final	
Athlete	Event	Time	Rank	Time	Rank	Time	Rank
Obaid Al Jasmi	Men's 200m Freestyle	1:58.49	55	did not advance			
Obaid Al Jasmi	Men's 50m Butterfly	26.20	40	did not advance			
Mubarak Al Besher	Men's 50m Breaststroke	30.02	38	did not advance			
Mubarak Al Besher	Men's 100m Breaststroke	1:06.70	69	did not advance			
