= Yousuf Al-Matrooshi =

Emirati swimmer (born 2003)

Personal information
- Born: 1 June 2003 (age 21); Dubai, United Arab Emirates

Sport
- Sport: Swimming

Yousuf Al-Matrooshi (born 1 June 2003) is an Emirati swimmer. He competed in the men's 100 metre freestyle at the 2020 Summer Olympics. He also competed at the 2024 Summer Olympics.
