= United Arab Emirates National Olympic Committee =

National Olympic Committee

- Country: United Arab Emirates
- Code: UAE
- Created: 1979; 47 years ago
- Recognized: 1980; 46 years ago
- Continental Association: OCA
- Website: www.uaenoc.ae

The United Arab Emirates National Olympic Committee (Arabic: اللجنة الأولمبية الوطنية بدولة الإمارات العربية المتحدة; IOC code: UAE) is a National Olympic Committee which represents United Arab Emirates.

The National Olympic Committee of United Arab Emirates (NOC) was named under the Ministerial Decision No. 200 of 1979 and joined the International Olympic Committee in 1980, the Arab Federation of Sports Games in 1980, the National Olympic Committees Association in 1981, the Olympic Council of Asia in 1982 and the Islamic Sports Solidarity Federation in 1985.
