= Flag of the United Arab Emirates =

United Arab Emirates (UAE)
- Use: National flag and ensign
- Proportion: 1:2
- Adopted: 2 December 1971; 54 years ago
- Design: A horizontal tricolour of green, white and black with a vertical quarter width red bar at the hoist
- Designed by: Abdulla Mohammed Al Maainah

The national flag of the United Arab Emirates (Note: Arabic: علم دولة الإمارات العربية المتحدة) contains the pan-Arab colors red, green, white, and black. It was designed in 1971 by Abdullah Mohammed Al Maainah, who was 19 years old at that time, and was adopted on 2 December 1971 after winning a nationwide flag design contest. The main theme of the flag's four colors is the sovereignty and unity of the Arab states.

Merchant ships may fly the alternative civil ensign, a red flag with the national flag in the canton. The airline Emirates uses the UAE flag as part of their livery.

All seven emirates use the federal flag interchangeably as the flag of the emirate, however, with the exception of Fujairah, all also emirates have separate flags (though some emirates share the same flag).

== Design ==
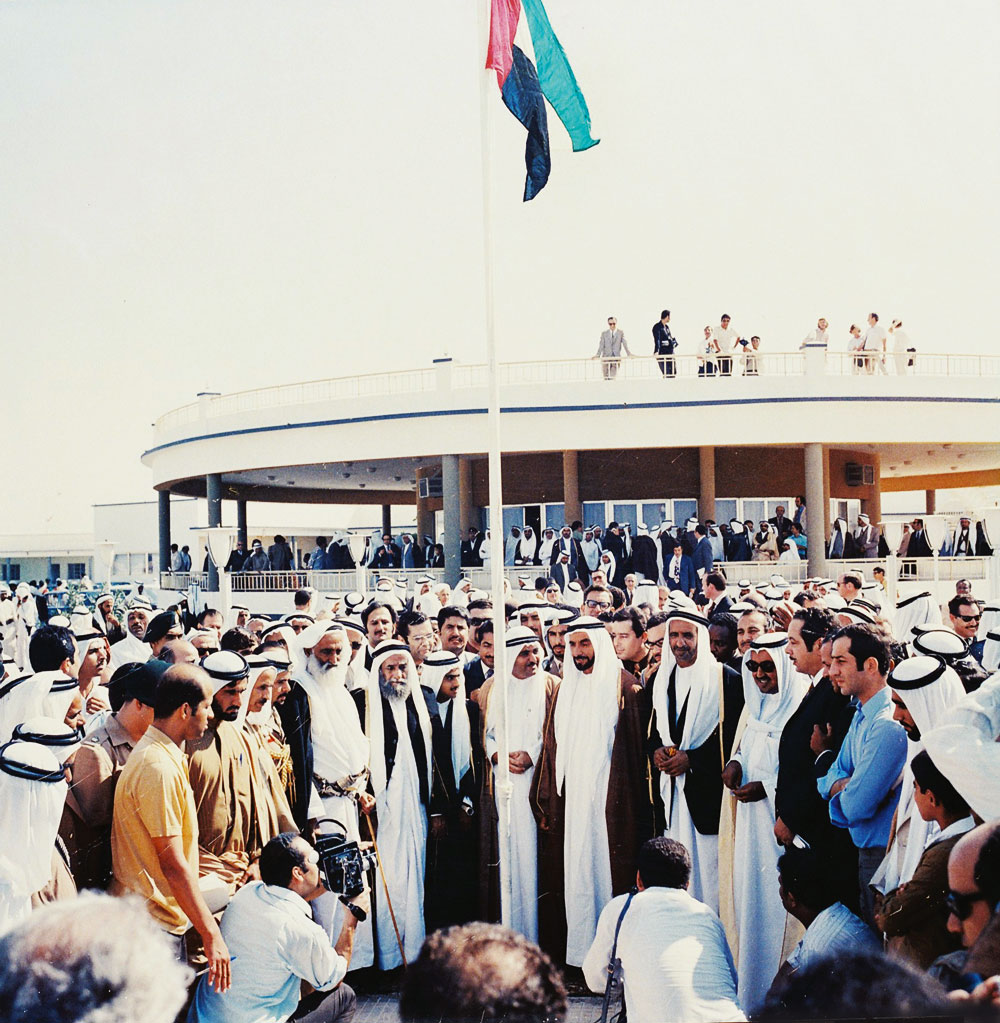
Historic photo depicting the first hoisting of the flag by the seven rulers of the emirates at Union House in Dubai on 2 December 1971.

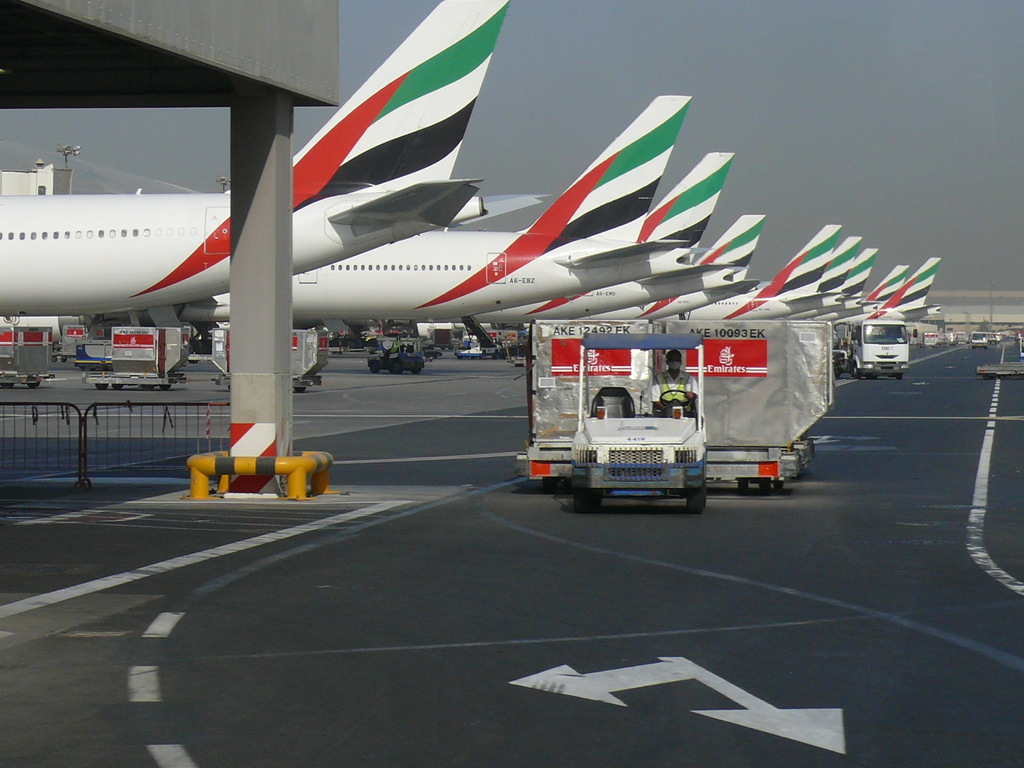
The airline Emirates includes the UAE flag in its aircraft livery.

=== Construction sheet ===
Construction sheet of the flag.

=== Colors and Symbolism ===
The red stripe represents energy and the sacrifices made by the people for their nation, the green stands for growth and prosperity, the black stands for dignity, and the white stripe represents peace and purity.

Colors		Green	White	Black	Red
Meaning		Plains of the Emirates	The Acts of the Emirates	The Battles and Dark Times of the Emirates	The Emirati Swords
Standard shades	PANTONE	PANTONE® 348C	PANTONE® White	PANTONE® BLACK	PANTONE® 186C
Standard shades	CMYK	96/2/100/12	0/0/0/0	10/10/10/100	0/100/85/6
Standard shades	RGB	0/132/61	225/225/225	0/0/0	200/16/46
Standard shades	Hexadecimal	#00843D	#E1E1E1	#000000	#C8102E

== Gallery ==
Alternative civil ensign. (Flag ratio: 1:2)

Flag of the United Arab Emirates Armed Forces

Flag of the United Arab Emirates Army

Flag of the president of the United Arab Emirates

Flag of the president of the United Arab Emirates (1973–2008)

Fin Flash of the United Arab Emirates Air Force (low visibility)

Flag of the United Arab Emirates Air Force

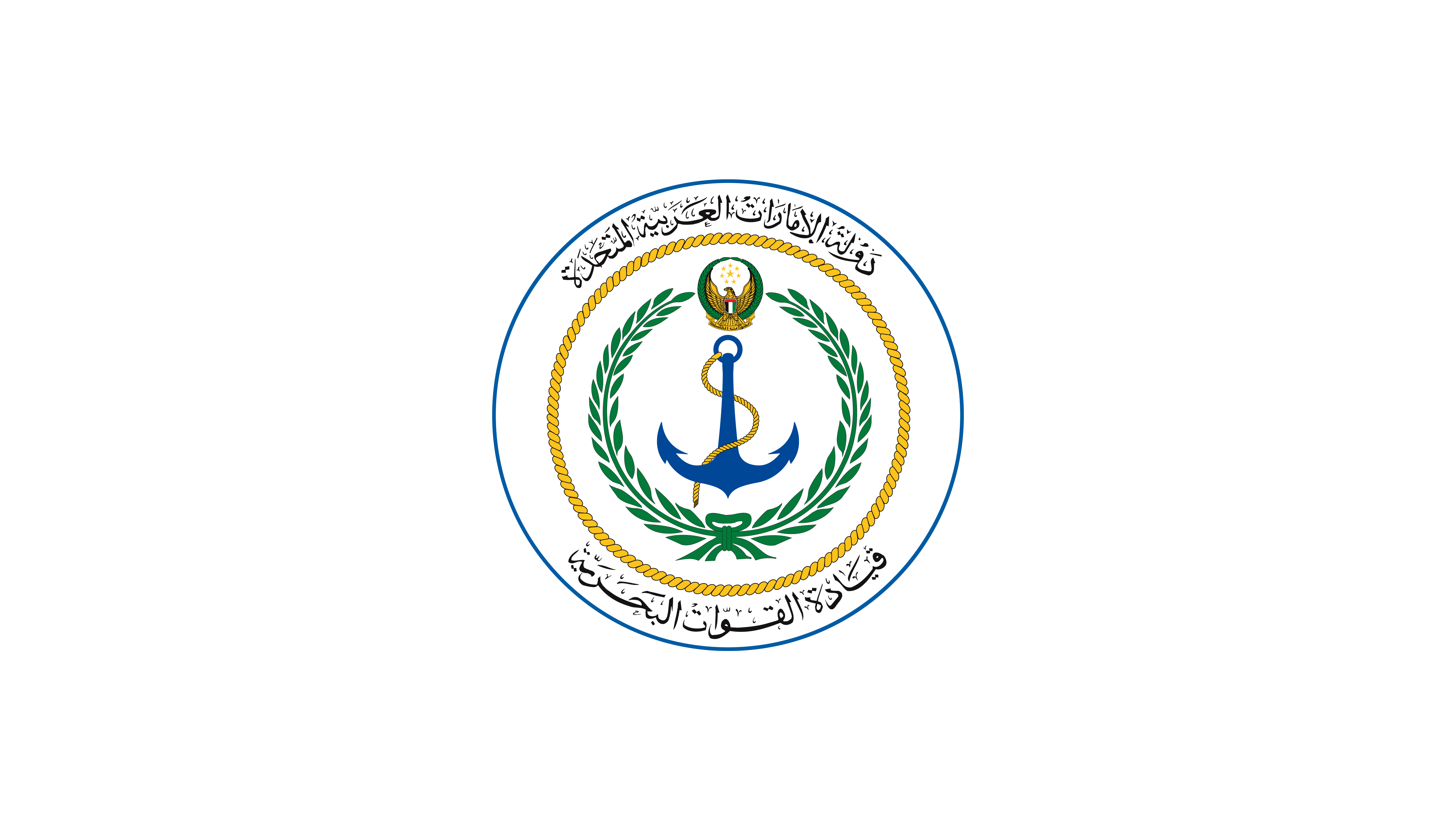
Flag of the United Arab Emirates Navy

=== Historical flags ===
Flag of the Hinawi (the Bani Yas of Abu Dhabi, Dubai, and Fujairah) and Ghafiri (Umm Al Quwain and Ajman) tribal confederations prior to 1820

Flag of the Al Qawasim (Sharjah and Ras Al Khaimah) prior to 1820

Flag of the Emirate of Kalba (1921–1952)

Flag of the Trucial States Council (1968–1971)

== Flag of each emirate ==
Each of the seven emirates within the United Arab Emirates belonged to either the Hinawi or Ghafiri tribal confederations; both had a red banner representing the Hashemite dynasty and allegiance to the Prophet Muhammad. The Qawasim, although part of the Ghafiri, had their own flag (a green, white, and red banner) to distinguish themselves as a maritime power. In 1820, after the British Empire campaign on Ras Al Khaimah, six of the seven emirates signed the General Maritime Treaty with the British Empire, which compelled them to be a British Protectorate in the region. A white segment was imposed, to be added to each emirate's flag. Fujairah at the time was not recognized as an emirate by the British and thus not made signatory of the 1820 Treaty, so it continued to use its own plain red flag.

On 6 November 1975, Sheikh Sultan bin Muhammad Al-Qasimi of Sharjah took down the British-imposed "White Pierced Red flag" for his emirate, stating:

After defeating the Al-Qawasim tribe, the British occupiers gave the Qawasim this flag to replace their own flag, which used to have three horizontal colours: green, white and red from top to bottom, with a Quranic inscription 'A victory from Allah and an imminent conquest' on the white part. The loss of our national flag occurred on Saturday 8 January 1820. So what I have done now is restore dignity to the citizens of Sharjah of today and to the citizens of Sharjah of the past, all of whom have been forced to salute the flag of the very aggressors who had removed our own flag, a flag that had symbolized the struggle of Al-Qawasim.

On 15 November 1975, Ajman, Umm Al Quwain, and Fujairah followed suit and replaced their flags with the federation flag. Soon after, the flags of the other emirates were lowered and the UAE flag was raised.

=== Abu Dhabi ===
Flag of Abu Dhabi

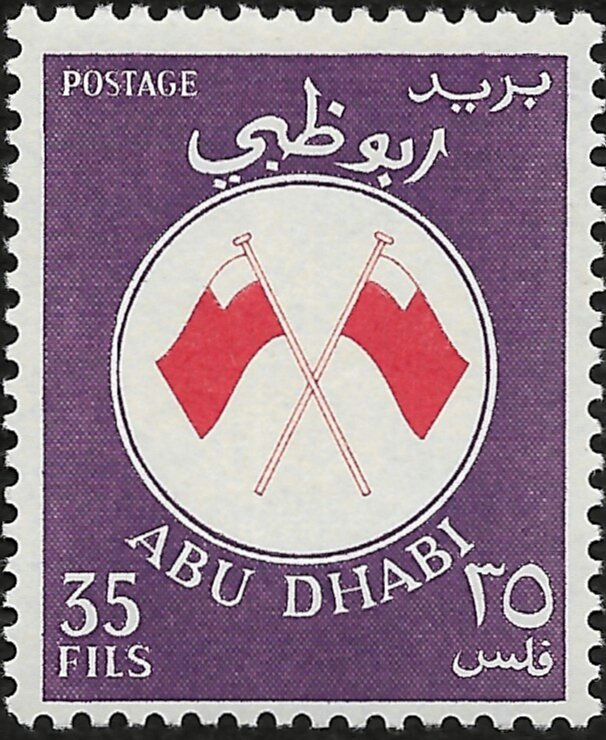
Abu Dhabi's flag on a 1967 Abu Dhabi stamp.

The flag of Abu Dhabi is a red flag with a white rectangle at the top-left corner. According to the 1820 General Maritime Treaty with the British, in times of war a full red flag would be used by the Bani Yas (Abu Dhabi and Dubai). Although per the treaty, Abu Dhabi was supposed to fly the White Pierced Red Trucial States flag, in practice it continued to fly a plain red flag. Percy Cox, the British Colonial Office administrator in the Middle East, was unsuccessful in convincing Zayed bin Khalifa Al Nahyan to adopt the Trucial States flag, which, Zayed argued, represented the Al Qawasim tribal federation. Abu Dhabi later adopted a red flag with a top left white rectangle to distinguish it from the surrounding emirates.

=== Ajman and Dubai ===
Flag of Ajman

Flag of Dubai

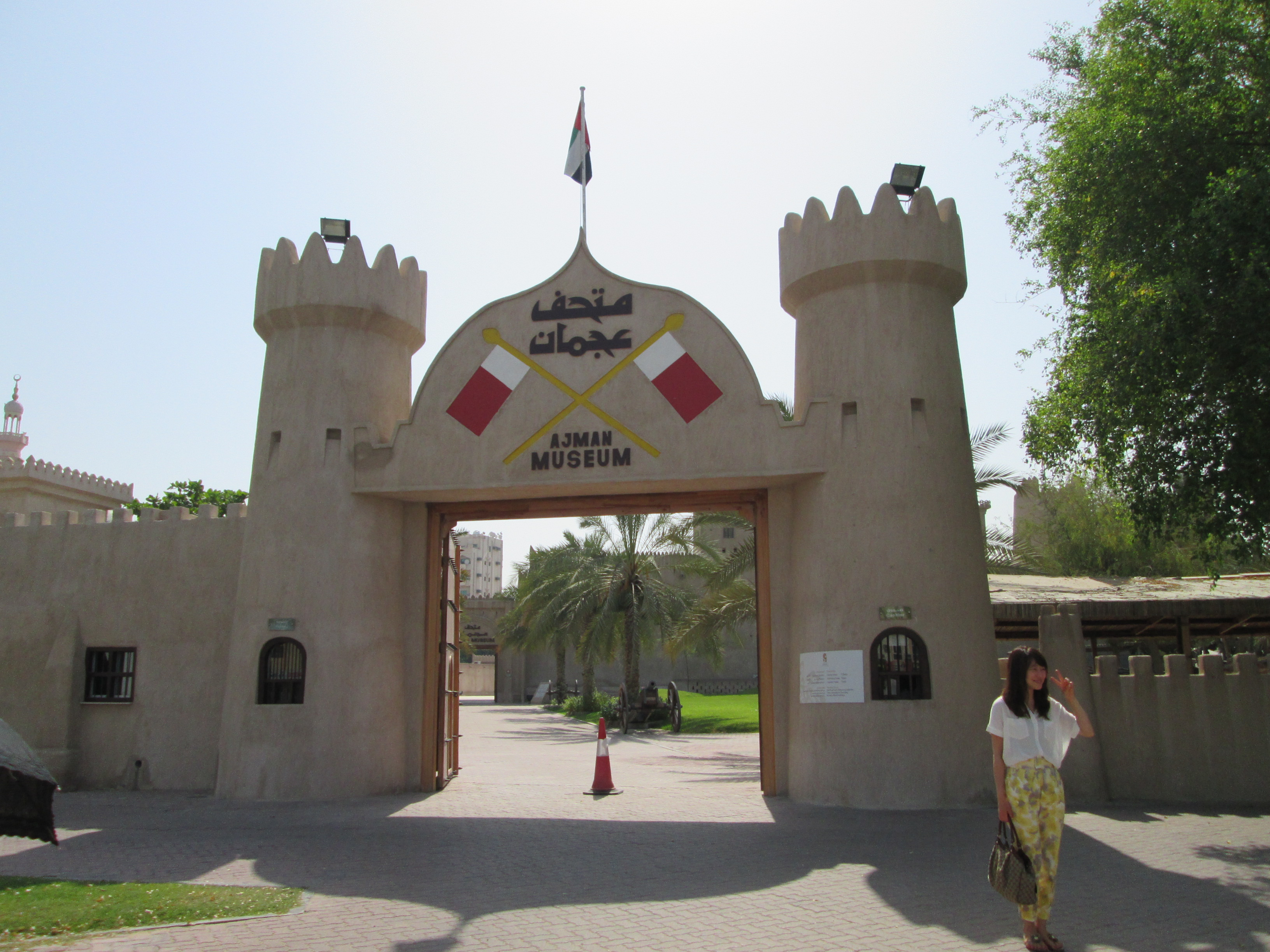
Ajman flags painted at the Ajman Museum.

The flags of Ajman and Dubai are identical, consisting of a red field with a white bar at the hoist, (i.e. closest to the flag staff). The flag is known as the White Red Halved and was adopted as an alternative to the Sharjah and Ras Al Khaimah White Pierced Red flags, to distinguish the Emirate of Dubai and Ajman from the Al Qawasim in defiance of the bonds of the 1820 General Maritime Treaty with the British. The British labelled this flag as "Trucial Coast Flag No. 1", with Abu Dhabi and Umm Al Quwain also expected to adopt it. According to the Treaty, in times of war a full red flag would be used by the Bani Yas (Abu Dhabi and Dubai) and a full white flag by Ajman.

The Shihuh of Musandam Peninsula (Ruus Al Jibal) also had a similar flag.

=== Fujairah ===
Flag of Fujairah before 1952, and 1961–1975

Flag of Fujairah 1952–1961

Before 1952, the flag of Fujairah was plain red. Fujairah did not sign the general treaty in 1820 with the British and therefore continued using its red plain flag. From 1952 to 1961, the emirate's name was added to the flag, and a red flag with white Arabic calligraphy of the emirate's name (Arabic: الفجيرة, romanized: al-Fujayra) was adopted as an ensign to distinguish it from the surrounding emirates. In 1975, the plain red flag was abolished and the national flag of the United Arab Emirates is now used for official purposes.

=== Ras Al Khaimah and Sharjah ===
Flag of Ras Al Khaimah and Sharjah (Al Qawasim) after signing the 1820 General Maritime Treaty with the British Empire

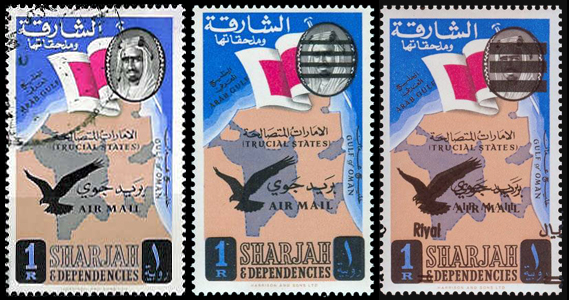
Flag of Sharjah depicted on a Sharjah stamp of 1963.

The flags of Ras Al Khaimah and Sharjah are identical as they are ruled by two branches of the same house. The flags have a large red rectangle on a white background. The flag, known as the White Pierced Red flag, was the intended flag for all the Trucial States according to the 1820 Maritime Treaty with the British. It was widely attributed to the Al Qawasim tribal federation. Percy Cox, the British Colonial Office administrator in the Middle East, was unsuccessful in convincing the rest of the emirates' Sheikhs to adopt it. The British called this "Trucial Coast Flag No. 2." According to the treaty, in times of war the original Al Qassimi flag (green, white and red flag) was to be used by the Qawasim.

=== Umm Al Quwain ===
Flag of Umm Al Quwain

The flag of Umm Al Quwain consists of a red background, a white bar at the hoist similar the flags of Ajman and Dubai, and a large white star and crescent in the center, a symbol of Islam representing allegiance to the Islamic world. The Umm Al Quwain flag was supposed to be the same White Red Halved flag as the one used by both Dubai and Ajman, but a star and crescent were added to distinguish it from the other emirates.

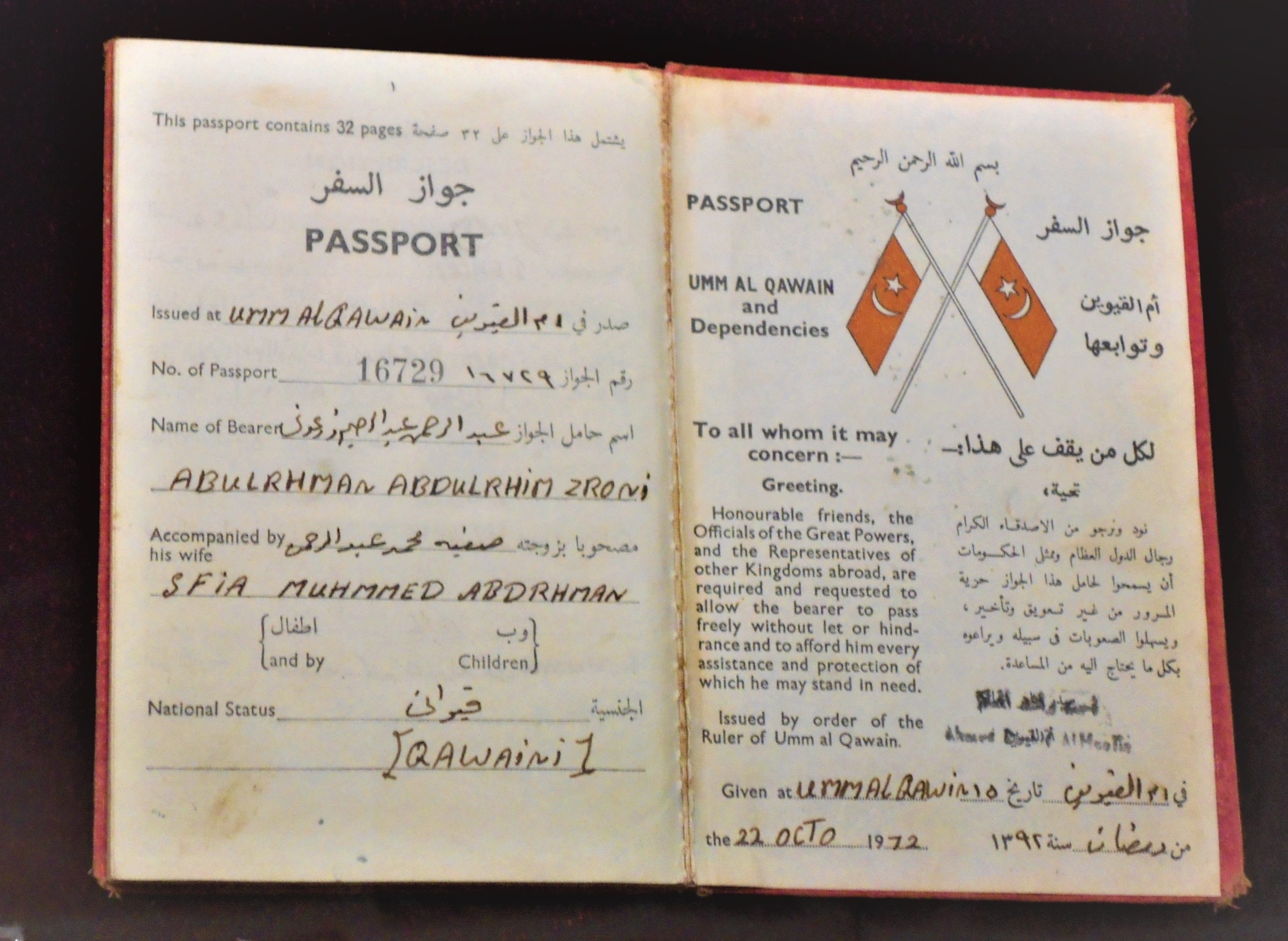
Umm Al Quwain flag on a 1972 passport

== See also ==
- Emblem of the United Arab Emirates
- Trucial States
- Pan Arab Colors
- Flag of Kuwait
- Flag of Syria
