= 2023 World Judo Championships – Men's 90 kg =

Judo competition

Judo Men's 90 kg at the 2023 World Judo Championships
- Venue: Ali Bin Hamad Al Attiya Arena
- Location: Doha, Qatar
- Date: 11 May 2023
- Competitors: 58 from 42 nations
- Total prize money: €57,000

Medalists
gold medal	Luka Maisuradze (1st title)	Georgia
silver medal	Lasha Bekauri	Georgia
bronze medal	Marcus Nyman	Sweden
bronze medal	Sanshiro Murao	Japan

Competition at external databases
- Links: IJF

The Men's 90 kg event at the 2023 World Judo Championships was held at the Ali Bin Hamad al-Attiyah Arena in Doha, Qatar on 11 May 2023.

== Results ==
=== Finals ===
Semi-finals
(Japan) Sanshiro Murao	01
(Georgia (country)) Lasha Bekauri	02
(Georgia (country)) Luka Maisuradze	01
(Italy) Christian Parlati	00

Final
(Georgia (country)) Lasha Bekauri	00
(Georgia (country)) Luka Maisuradze	01

=== Repechage ===
Repechage
(Sweden) Marcus Nyman	10
Mansur Lorsanov	00
(Netherlands) Noël van 't End	00
(Cuba) Iván Felipe Silva Morales	10

Bronze medal
(Sweden) Marcus Nyman	11
(Italy) Christian Parlati	00
(Cuba) Iván Felipe Silva Morales	00
(Japan) Sanshiro Murao	10

=== Pool A ===
First round
(United Arab Emirates) Aram Grigorian	10
(Egypt) Ali Hazem	00
(Netherlands) Jesper Smink	01
(France) Alexis Mathieu	00
(Dominican Republic) Robert Florentino	10
(South Africa) Thomas-Laszlo Breytenbach	00
(Azerbaijan) Mammadali Mehdiyev	02
(Cameroon) Kevin Budain	00
Mikhail Igolnikov	00
(Kyrgyzstan) Erlan Sherov	10
(Italy) Nicholas Mungai	02
(Israel) Li Kochman	00
(United States) John Jayne	00
(Sweden) Marcus Nyman	10

Round of 32
(Japan) Sanshiro Murao	01
(United Arab Emirates) Aram Grigorian	00
(Netherlands) Jesper Smink	00
(Dominican Republic) Robert Florentino	02
(Azerbaijan) Mammadali Mehdiyev	01
(Kyrgyzstan) Erlan Sherov	00
(Italy) Nicholas Mungai	00
(Sweden) Marcus Nyman	10

Round of 16
(Japan) Sanshiro Murao	10
(Dominican Republic) Robert Florentino	00
(Azerbaijan) Mammadali Mehdiyev	00
(Sweden) Marcus Nyman	02

Quarter-finals
(Japan) Sanshiro Murao	10
(Sweden) Marcus Nyman	00

=== Pool B ===
First round
(Spain) Tristani Mosakhlishvili	00
(Brazil) Rafael Macedo	01
(Belgium) Karel Foubert	00
Mansur Lorsanov	01
(Lebanon) Caramnob Sagaipov	00
(Canada) Louis Krieber-Gagnon	01
(Tajikistan) Komronshokh Ustopiriyon	10
(New Zealand) Noah Walliss	00
(Senegal) Abderahmane Diao	00
(Serbia) Nemanja Majdov	02
(South Korea) Han Ju-yeop	02
(Estonia) Klen-Kristofer Kaljulaid	00

Round of 32
(Hungary) Krisztián Tóth	00
(Brazil) Rafael Macedo	01
Mansur Lorsanov	01
(Canada) Louis Krieber-Gagnon	00
(Georgia (country)) Lasha Bekauri	10
(Tajikistan) Komronshokh Ustopiriyon	00
(Serbia) Nemanja Majdov	10
(South Korea) Han Ju-yeop	00

Round of 16
(Brazil) Rafael Macedo	00
Mansur Lorsanov	02
(Georgia (country)) Lasha Bekauri	01
(Serbia) Nemanja Majdov	00

Quarter-finals
Mansur Lorsanov	00
(Georgia (country)) Lasha Bekauri	02

=== Pool C ===
First round
(Hungary) Roland Gőz	10
(Mongolia) Gantulgyn Altanbagana	00
(Turkey) Mihael Žgank	01
(Mauritius) Rémi Feuillet	00
Yahor Varapayeu	01
(Argentina) Mariano Coto	00
(Netherlands) Noël van 't End	01
(Slovakia) Peter Žilka	00
(Egypt) Omar El Ramly	00
(Tajikistan) Dzhakhongir Madzhidov	01
(Belgium) Sami Chouchi	01
(Estonia) Mattias Kuusik	00
(Israel) Guy Gurevitch	00
(Peru) Yuta Galarreta	01

Round of 32
(Georgia (country)) Luka Maisuradze	02
(Hungary) Roland Gőz	00
(Turkey) Mihael Žgank	01
Yahor Varapayeu	00
(Netherlands) Noël van 't End	10
(Tajikistan) Dzhakhongir Madzhidov	00
(Belgium) Sami Chouchi	10
(Peru) Yuta Galarreta	00

Round of 16
(Georgia (country)) Luka Maisuradze	11
(Turkey) Mihael Žgank	00
(Netherlands) Noël van 't End	10
(Belgium) Sami Chouchi	00

Quarter-finals
(Georgia (country)) Luka Maisuradze	10
(Netherlands) Noël van 't End	00

=== Pool D ===
First round
(France) Maxime-Gaël Ngayap Hambou	10
(Czech Republic) David Klammert	00
(United Kingdom) Jamal Petgrave	00
(Greece) Theodoros Tselidis	01
(Azerbaijan) Murad Fatiyev	02
(Romania) Alex Creţ	00
(Serbia) Darko Brašnjović	10
(Brazil) Giovani Ferreira	00
(Kazakhstan) Didar Khamza	00
(Moldova) Dorin Gotonoaga	10
(Kyrgyzstan) Anarbek Ishenbaev	00
(Bulgaria) Ivaylo Ivanov	10

Round of 32
(Cuba) Iván Felipe Silva Morales	10
(France) Maxime-Gaël Ngayap Hambou	00
(Greece) Theodoros Tselidis	00
(Azerbaijan) Murad Fatiyev	10
(Italy) Christian Parlati	11
(Serbia) Darko Brašnjović	00
(Moldova) Dorin Gotonoaga	00
(Bulgaria) Ivaylo Ivanov	02

Round of 16
(Cuba) Iván Felipe Silva Morales	01
(Azerbaijan) Murad Fatiyev	00
(Italy) Christian Parlati	02
(Bulgaria) Ivaylo Ivanov	00

Quarter-finals
(Cuba) Iván Felipe Silva Morales	00
(Italy) Christian Parlati	02

== Prize money ==
The sums listed bring the total prizes awarded to €57,000 for the individual event.

Medal	Total	Judoka	Coach
Gold	€26,000	€20,800	€5,200
Silver	€15,000	€12,000	€3,000
Bronze	€8,000	€6,400	€1,600
