= 2018 World Judo Championships – Men's 90 kg =

Judo competition

Judo Men's 90 kg at the 2018 World Judo Championships
- Venue: National Gymnastics Arena
- Location: Baku, Azerbaijan
- Dates: 24 September
- Competitors: 75 from 58 nations
- Total prize money: 57,000€

Medalists
| gold medal | Nikoloz Sherazadishvili (1st title) | Spain |
| silver medal | Iván Felipe Silva | Cuba |
| bronze medal | Kenta Nagasawa | Japan |
| bronze medal | Axel Clerget | France |

Competition at external databases
- Links: IJF • JudoInside

The Men's 90 kg competition at the 2018 World Judo Championships was held on 24 September 2018.

== Results ==
=== Finals ===
Semi-finals
(Cuba) Iván Felipe Silva | 10
(France) Axel Clerget | 00
(Hungary) Krisztián Tóth | 00
(Spain) Nikoloz Sherazadishvili | 01

Final
(Cuba) Iván Felipe Silva | 01
(Spain) Nikoloz Sherazadishvili | 10

=== Repechage ===
Repechage
(Japan) Kenta Nagasawa | 01
(Tajikistan) Komronshokh Ustopiriyon | 00

Third place
(Japan) Kenta Nagasawa | 10
(Hungary) Krisztián Tóth | 01

Repechage
(Germany) Eduard Trippel | 10
(Cuba) Asley González | 00

Third place
(Germany) Eduard Trippel | 01
(France) Axel Clerget | 10

=== Pool A ===
Preliminary round fights

| | Score | |
|---|---|---|
| Jaakko Alli (Finland) | 01–10 | (United States) Colton Brown |
| Piotr Kuczera (Poland) | 01–00 | (Israel) Li Kochman |
| Adrián Nacimento (Spain) | 00–01 | (China) Bu Hebilige |

First round
(Serbia) Aleksandar Kukolj | 00
(Lebanon) Nacif Elias | 11
(United States) Colton Brown | 10
(Slovenia) David Kukovica | 00
(Ukraine) Quedjau Nhabali | 10
(Bangladesh) Md Abul Kalam Ajad | 00
(Cuba) Iván Felipe Silva | 10
(Gabon) Paul Kibikai | 00
(Mongolia) Gantulga Altanbagana | 01
(Poland) Piotr Kuczera | 00
(Japan) Kenta Nagasawa | 10
(Seychelles) Nantenaina Finesse | 00
(China) Bu Hebilige | 00
(Georgia (country)) Ushangi Margiani | 10
(Brazil) Rafael Macedo | 00
(Greece) Theodoros Tselidis | 01

Second round
(Lebanon) Nacif Elias | 11
(United States) Colton Brown | 00
(Ukraine) Quedjau Nhabali | 00
(Cuba) Iván Felipe Silva | 10
(Mongolia) Gantulga Altanbagana | 00
(Japan) Kenta Nagasawa | 10
(Georgia (country)) Ushangi Margiani | 01
(Greece) Theodoros Tselidis | 00

Third round
(Lebanon) Nacif Elias | 00
(Cuba) Iván Felipe Silva | 01
(Japan) Kenta Nagasawa | 10
(Georgia (country)) Ushangi Margiani | 00

Quarterfinals
(Cuba) Iván Felipe Silva | 10
(Japan) Kenta Nagasawa | 00

=== Pool B ===
Preliminary round fights

| | Score | |
|---|---|---|
| Iniki Uera (Nauru) | 00–11 | (Belarus) Yahor Varapayeu |
| Yuta Galarreta (Peru) | 10–00 | (Democratic Republic of the Congo) Eyale Le Beau |
| Jesper Smink (Netherlands) | 00–10 | (Dominican Republic) Robert Florentino |

First round
(South Korea) Gwak Dong-han | 10
(Canada) Louis Krieber | 00
(Belarus) Yahor Varapayeu | 00
(France) Axel Clerget | 10
(Russia) Khusen Khalmurzaev | 10
(Portugal) João Martinho | 00
(Kyrgyzstan) Faruch Bulekulov | 10
(United Arab Emirates) Mihail Marchitan | 00
(Tajikistan) Komronshokh Ustopiriyon | 10
(Peru) Yuta Galarreta | 00
(Switzerland) Ciril Grossklaus | 10
(Cameroon) Dieudonne Dolassem | 00
(Dominican Republic) Robert Florentino | 10
(Czech Republic) David Klammert | 00
(Slovakia) Peter Žilka | 10
(Nepal) Ravin Shrestha | 00

Second round
(South Korea) Gwak Dong-han | 00
(France) Axel Clerget | 11
(Russia) Khusen Khalmurzaev | 01
(Kyrgyzstan) Faruch Bulekulov | 00
(Tajikistan) Komronshokh Ustopiriyon | 01
(Switzerland) Ciril Grossklaus | 00
(Dominican Republic) Robert Florentino | 00
(Slovakia) Peter Žilka | 10

Third round
(France) Axel Clerget | 01
(Russia) Khusen Khalmurzaev | 00
(Tajikistan) Komronshokh Ustopiriyon | 01
(Slovakia) Peter Žilka | 00

Quarterfinals
(France) Axel Clerget | 10
(Tajikistan) Komronshokh Ustopiriyon | 00

=== Pool C ===
Preliminary round fights

| | Score | |
|---|---|---|
| Ali Hazem (Egypt) | 00–10 | (Netherlands) Noël van 't End |
| Rokas Nenartavičius (Lithuania) | 00–11 | (Czech Republic) Jiří Petr |

First round
(Georgia (country)) Beka Gviniashvili | 00
(Germany) Eduard Trippel | 10
(United States) Matthew Koch | 00
(Australia) Harrison Cassar | 10
(Portugal) Tiago Rodrigues | 10
(Nauru) Ovini Uera | 00
(Netherlands) Noël van 't End | 10
(Uzbekistan) Davlat Bobonov | 00
(Hungary) Krisztián Tóth | 10
(Kazakhstan) Islam Bozbayev | 00
(Azerbaijan) Mammadali Mehdiyev | 01
(Belarus) Viktar Kliavusau | 00
(Poland) Rafał Kozłowski | 11
(Czech Republic) Jiří Petr | 01
(Finland) Aatu Laamanen | 10
(Iraq) Shihab Al-Quraishi | 00

Second round
(Germany) Eduard Trippel | 11
(Australia) Harrison Cassar | 00
(Portugal) Tiago Rodrigues | 00
(Netherlands) Noël van 't End | 10
(Hungary) Krisztián Tóth | 01
(Azerbaijan) Mammadali Mehdiyev | 00
(Poland) Rafał Kozłowski | 01
(Finland) Aatu Laamanen | 00

Third round
(Germany) Eduard Trippel | 10
(Netherlands) Noël van 't End | 00
(Hungary) Krisztián Tóth | 10
(Poland) Rafał Kozłowski | 00

Quarterfinals
(Germany) Eduard Trippel | 00
(Hungary) Krisztián Tóth | 10

=== Pool D ===
Preliminary round fights

| | Score | |
|---|---|---|
| Egill Blöndal (Iceland) | 10–00 | (Pakistan) Qaisar Khan |
| Abdoulaye Millimono (Guinea) | 00–10 | (Turkey) Mihael Žgank |
| Zachary Burt (Canada) | 00–10 | (France) Aurelien Diesse |

First round
(Spain) Nikoloz Sherazadishvili | 10
(Iceland) Egill Blöndal | 00
(Russia) Mikhail Igolnikov | 10
(Colombia) Francisco Balanta | 00
(Ghana) Victor Ahiavor | 00
(United Kingdom) Max Stewart | 10
(Turkey) Mihael Žgank | 10
(Estonia) Klen Kaljulaid | 00
(Serbia) Nemanja Majdov | 00
(France) Aurelien Diesse | 10
(Cuba) Asley González | 01
(China) Wang Xuewen | 00
(Latvia) Dāvis Dūda | 00
(Slovakia) Milan Randl | 10
(Benin) Celtus Dossou | 00
(Italy) Nicholas Mungai | 10

Second round
(Spain) Nikoloz Sherazadishvili | 01
(Russia) Mikhail Igolnikov | 00
(United Kingdom) Max Stewart | 00
(Turkey) Mihael Žgank | 01
(France) Aurelien Diesse | 00
(Cuba) Asley González | 01
(Slovakia) Milan Randl | 00
(Italy) Nicholas Mungai | 01

Third round
(Spain) Nikoloz Sherazadishvili | 10
(Turkey) Mihael Žgank | 00
(Cuba) Asley González | 01
(Italy) Nicholas Mungai | 00

Quarterfinals
(Spain) Nikoloz Sherazadishvili | 11
(Cuba) Asley González | 00

== Prize money ==
The sums listed bring the total prizes awarded to 57,000€ for the individual event.

| Medal | Total | Judoka | Coach |
|---|---|---|---|
| Gold | 26,000€ | 20,800€ | 5,200€ |
| Silver | 15,000€ | 12,000€ | 3,000€ |
| Bronze | 8,000€ | 6,400€ | 1,600€ |
