= 2022 World Judo Championships – Men's 90 kg =

Judo competition

Judo Men's 90 kg at the 2022 World Judo Championships
- Venue: Humo Ice Dome
- Location: Tashkent, Uzbekistan
- Date: 10 October
- Competitors: 49 from 38 nations
- Total prize money: €57,000

Medalists
gold medal	Davlat Bobonov (1st title)	Uzbekistan
silver medal	Christian Parlati	Italy
bronze medal	Luka Maisuradze	Georgia
bronze medal	Lasha Bekauri	Georgia

Competition at external databases
- Links: IJF • JudoInside

The Men's 90 kg event at the 2022 World Judo Championships was held at the Humo Ice Dome arena in Tashkent, Uzbekistan on 10 October 2022.

== Results ==
=== Finals ===
Semi-finals
(Uzbekistan) Davlat Bobonov	10
(Georgia (country)) Lasha Bekauri	00
(Italy) Christian Parlati	10
(Georgia (country)) Luka Maisuradze	00

Final
(Uzbekistan) Davlat Bobonov	10
(Italy) Christian Parlati	00

=== Repechage ===
Repechage
(Bulgaria) Ivaylo Ivanov	00
(Cuba) Iván Felipe Silva Morales	10
(Brazil) Marcelo Gomes	00
(Spain) Tristani Mosakhlishvili	10

Bronze medal
(Cuba) Iván Felipe Silva Morales	00
(Georgia (country)) Luka Maisuradze	01
(Spain) Tristani Mosakhlishvili	00
(Georgia (country)) Lasha Bekauri	11

=== Pool A ===
First round
(Slovakia) Peter Žilka	w/o
(Dominican Republic) ~~Robert Florentino~~	00
(South Korea) Han Ju-yeop	01
(Hungary) Gergely Nerpel	00
(United Arab Emirates) Aram Grigorian	00
(Turkey) Mihael Žgank	10
(Portugal) Anri Egutidze	01
(United States) John Jayne	00
(Bulgaria) Ivaylo Ivanov	01
(Tajikistan) Komronshokh Ustopiriyon	00

Round of 32
(Uzbekistan) Davlat Bobonov	11
(Slovakia) Peter Žilka	01
(South Korea) Han Ju-yeop	10
(Turkey) Mihael Žgank	00
(Netherlands) Noël van 't End	10
(Portugal) Anri Egutidze	00
(Bulgaria) Ivaylo Ivanov	01
(Italy) Nicholas Mungai	00

Round of 16
(Uzbekistan) Davlat Bobonov	10
(South Korea) Han Ju-yeop	00
(Netherlands) Noël van 't End	00
(Bulgaria) Ivaylo Ivanov	10

Quarter-finals
(Uzbekistan) Davlat Bobonov	11
(Bulgaria) Ivaylo Ivanov	01

=== Pool B ===
First round
(Serbia) Nemanja Majdov	10
(Moldova) Dorin Gotonoaga	00
(Kazakhstan) Didar Khamza	00
(Czech Republic) David Klammert	01
(Australia) Harrison Cassar	00
(Japan) Kosuke Mashiyama	10
(Estonia) Klen-Kristofer Kaljulaid	10
(Kyrgyzstan) Erlan Sherov	01

Round of 32
(Cuba) Iván Felipe Silva Morales	01
(Serbia) Nemanja Majdov	00
(Mauritius) Rémi Feuillet	00
(Czech Republic) David Klammert	01
(Georgia (country)) Lasha Bekauri	10
(Japan) Kosuke Mashiyama	00
(Brazil) Rafael Macedo	10
(Estonia) Klen-Kristofer Kaljulaid	00

Round of 16
(Cuba) Iván Felipe Silva Morales	11
(Czech Republic) David Klammert	00
(Georgia (country)) Lasha Bekauri	01
(Brazil) Rafael Macedo	00

Quarter-finals
(Cuba) Iván Felipe Silva Morales	00
(Georgia (country)) Lasha Bekauri	10

=== Pool C ===
First round
(Italy) Christian Parlati	10
(United States) Alexander Knauf	00
(Serbia) Darko Brašnjović	00
(Greece) Theodoros Tselidis	10
(South Africa) Thomas-Laszlo Breytenbach	01
(Netherlands) Jesper Smink	11
(France) Alexis Mathieu	10
(Senegal) Abderahmane Diao	00

Round of 32
(Azerbaijan) Mammadali Mehdiyev	00
(Italy) Christian Parlati	10
(Greece) Theodoros Tselidis	01
(Austria) Wachid Borchashvili	00
(Germany) Eduard Trippel	10
(Netherlands) Jesper Smink	00
(France) Alexis Mathieu	00
(Brazil) Marcelo Gomes	10

Round of 16
(Italy) Christian Parlati	10
(Greece) Theodoros Tselidis	00
(Germany) Eduard Trippel	00
(Brazil) Marcelo Gomes	10

Quarter-finals
(Italy) Christian Parlati	10
(Brazil) Marcelo Gomes	01

=== Pool D ===
First round
(Romania) Alex Creţ	00
(Spain) Tristani Mosakhlishvili	10
(Ukraine) Stanislav Gunchenko	10
(Slovakia) Milan Randl	00
(Lebanon) Caramnob Sagaipov	10
(Estonia) Mattias Kuusik	00
(Mongolia) Gantulgyn Altanbagana	10
(Egypt) Ali Hazem	00

Round of 32
(Hungary) Krisztián Tóth	00
(Spain) Tristani Mosakhlishvili	10
(Tajikistan) Dzhakhongir Madzhidov	00
(Ukraine) Stanislav Gunchenko	10
(Georgia (country)) Luka Maisuradze	11
(Lebanon) Caramnob Sagaipov	00
(Kyrgyzstan) Anarbek Ishenbaev	00
(Mongolia) Gantulgyn Altanbagana	01

Round of 16
(Spain) Tristani Mosakhlishvili	10
(Ukraine) Stanislav Gunchenko	00
(Georgia (country)) Luka Maisuradze	10
(Mongolia) Gantulgyn Altanbagana	00

Quarter-finals
(Spain) Tristani Mosakhlishvili	00
(Georgia (country)) Luka Maisuradze	10
