= 2021 World Judo Championships – Men's 90 kg =

Judo competition

Judo Men's 90 kg at the 2021 World Judo Championships
- Venue: László Papp Budapest Sports Arena
- Location: Budapest, Hungary
- Date: 10 June
- Competitors: 58 from 44 nations
- Total prize money: 57,000€

Medalists
gold medal	Nikoloz Sherazadishvili (2nd title)	Spain
silver medal	Davlat Bobonov	Uzbekistan
bronze medal	Krisztián Tóth	Hungary
bronze medal	Marcus Nyman	Sweden

Competition at external databases
- Links: IJF • JudoInside

The Men's 90 kg competition at the 2021 World Judo Championships was held on 10 June 2021.

== Results ==
=== Finals ===
Semi-finals
(Spain) Nikoloz Sherazadishvili	10
(Japan) Kenta Nagasawa	00
(Hungary) Krisztián Tóth	00
(Uzbekistan) Davlat Bobonov	01

Final
(Spain) Nikoloz Sherazadishvili	10
(Uzbekistan) Davlat Bobonov	00

=== Repechage ===
Repechage
(Mongolia) Gantulgyn Altanbagana	01
(Mauritius) Rémi Feuillet	00

Third place
(Mongolia) Gantulgyn Altanbagana	00
(Hungary) Krisztián Tóth	10

Repechage
(Sweden) Marcus Nyman	10
(Kazakhstan) Islam Bozbayev	00

Third place
(Sweden) Marcus Nyman	01
(Japan) Kenta Nagasawa	00

=== Pool A ===
First round
(Kyrgyzstan) Faruch Bulekulov	10
(United States) John Jayne	00
(Democratic Republic of the Congo) Eyale Le Beau	00
(Poland) Piotr Kuczera	10
(Colombia) Francisco Balanta	00
(Estonia) Mattias Kuusik	10
(Germany) Eduard Trippel	11
(Israel) Guy Gurevitch	00
(South Korea) Mun Kyu-joon	00
(Brazil) Rafael Macedo	01
(Serbia) Boško Borenović	00
(Mongolia) Gantulgyn Altanbagana	10
(Czech Republic) David Klammert	01
(Slovakia) Peter Zilka	00

Second round
(Spain) Nikoloz Sherazadishvili	10
(Kyrgyzstan) Faruch Bulekulov	00
(Poland) Piotr Kuczera	10
(Estonia) Mattias Kuusik	00
(Germany) Eduard Trippel	00
(Brazil) Rafael Macedo	11
(Mongolia) Gantulgyn Altanbagana	01
(Czech Republic) David Klammert	00

Third round
(Spain) Nikoloz Sherazadishvili	10
(Poland) Piotr Kuczera	00
(Brazil) Rafael Macedo	00
(Mongolia) Gantulgyn Altanbagana	10

Quarterfinals
(Spain) Nikoloz Sherazadishvili	10
(Mongolia) Gantulgyn Altanbagana	00

=== Pool B ===
First round
(Tajikistan) Dzhakhongir Madzhidov	01
(Switzerland) Ciril Grossklaus	10
(Canada) Mohab Elnahas	00
(Mauritius) Rémi Feuillet	01
(Gabon) Paul Kibikai	10
(Benin) Celtus Dossou	00
(Latvia) Aleksejs Zarudņevs	00
(United Kingdom) Max Stewart	10
(Italy) Nicholas Mungai	10
(Greece) Theodoros Tselidis	00
(Hungary) Péter Sáfrány	01
(Kazakhstan) Yersultan Muzapparov	10

Second round
(Georgia (country)) Beka Gviniashvili	01
(Switzerland) Ciril Grossklaus	10
(Mauritius) Rémi Feuillet	10
(Gabon) Paul Kibikai	01
(Japan) Kenta Nagasawa	10
(United Kingdom) Max Stewart	00
(Italy) Nicholas Mungai	11
(Kazakhstan) Yersultan Muzapparov	00

Third round
(Switzerland) Ciril Grossklaus	00
(Mauritius) Rémi Feuillet	01
(Japan) Kenta Nagasawa	10
(Italy) Nicholas Mungai	00

Quarterfinals
(Mauritius) Rémi Feuillet	00
(Japan) Kenta Nagasawa	01

=== Pool C ===
First round
(Kyrgyzstan) Erlan Sherov	10
(Poland) Sebastian Ołdak	00
(United States) Colton Brown	10
(Senegal) Abderahmane Diao	00
(Algeria) Abderrahmane Benamadi	00
(South Korea) Han Ju-yeop	01
(Sweden) Marcus Nyman	10
(Liechtenstein) Raphael Schwendinger	00
(Slovenia) Narsej Lackovič	00
(Estonia) Klen Kaljulaid	10
(Slovakia) Milan Randl	00
(Peru) Yuta Galarreta	11
(Gabon) Adama Mintsa	00
(Tajikistan) Komronshokh Ustopiriyon	11

Second round
(Hungary) Krisztián Tóth	10
(Kyrgyzstan) Erlan Sherov	01
(United States) Colton Brown	00
(South Korea) Han Ju-yeop	10
(Sweden) Marcus Nyman	10
(Estonia) Klen Kaljulaid	00
(Peru) Yuta Galarreta	00
(Tajikistan) Komronshokh Ustopiriyon	10

Third round
(Hungary) Krisztián Tóth	01
(South Korea) Han Ju-yeop	00
(Sweden) Marcus Nyman	10
(Tajikistan) Komronshokh Ustopiriyon	00

Quarterfinals
(Hungary) Krisztián Tóth	01
(Sweden) Marcus Nyman	00

=== Pool D ===
First round
(Egypt) Hatem Abd el Akher	00
(Kazakhstan) Islam Bozbayev	10
(Czech Republic) Jiří Petr	10
(Ghana) Kwadjo Anani	01
(Moldova) Iurie Mocanu	00
(Japan) Sanshiro Murao	10
(Israel) Li Kochman	10
(Panama) José Ortega	00
(Netherlands) Jesper Smink	10
(San Marino) Paolo Persoglia	00

Second round
(Cuba) Iván Felipe Silva Morales	10
(Ukraine) Quedjau Nhabali	00
(Kazakhstan) Islam Bozbayev	10
(Czech Republic) Jiří Petr	00
(Uzbekistan) Davlat Bobonov	10
(Japan) Sanshiro Murao	00
(Israel) Li Kochman	10
(Netherlands) Jesper Smink	00

Third round
(Cuba) Iván Felipe Silva Morales	00
(Kazakhstan) Islam Bozbayev	01
(Uzbekistan) Davlat Bobonov	10
(Israel) Li Kochman	00

Quarterfinals
(Kazakhstan) Islam Bozbayev	00
(Uzbekistan) Davlat Bobonov	10

== Prize money ==
The sums listed bring the total prizes awarded to €57,000 for the individual event.

Medal	Total	Judoka	Coach
Gold	€26,000	€20,800	€5,200
Silver	€15,000	€12,000	€3,000
Bronze	€8,000	€6,400	€1,600
