= 2018 European Judo Championships – Men's 90 kg =

Judo competition

Judo Men's 90 kg at the 2018 European Judo Championships
- Venue: Expo Tel Aviv
- Location: Tel Aviv, Israel
- Date: 28 April

Medalists
gold medal	Mikhail Igolnikov (1st title)	Russia
silver medal	Nemanja Majdov	Serbia
bronze medal	Nikoloz Sherazadishvili	Spain
bronze medal	Theodoros Tselidis	Greece

Competition at external databases
- Links: IJF • JudoInside

The men's 90 kg competition at the 2018 European Judo Championships was held on 28 April at the Expo Tel Aviv.

== Results ==
=== Finals ===
Semi-finals
Theodoros Tselidis (GRE)	00
Nemanja Majdov (SRB)	10
Mikhail Igolnikov (RUS)	10
Nikoloz Sherazadishvili (ESP)	00

Final
Nemanja Majdov (SRB)	00
Mikhail Igolnikov (RUS)	01

=== Repechage ===
Repechage
Yahor Varapayeu (BLR)	10
Batuhan Efemgil (TUR)	01

Third place
Yahor Varapayeu (BLR)	01
Nikoloz Sherazadishvili (ESP)	10

Repechage
Beka Gviniashvili (GEO)	01
Noël van 't End (NED)	10

Third place
Noël van 't End (NED)	00
Theodoros Tselidis (GRE)	01

=== Pool A ===
First round
Yahor Varapayeu (BLR)	01
Ciril Grossklaus (SUI)	00
Georgios Kroussaniotakis (CYP)	00
Joachim Bottieau (BEL)	10

Round of 32
Aleksandar Kukolj (SRB)	00
Yahor Varapayeu (BLR)	01
Frazer Chamberlain (GBR)	00
Klen-Kristofer Kaljulaid (EST)	01
Ushangi Margiani (GEO)	01
Joachim Bottieau (BEL)	00
Theodoros Tselidis (GRE)	10
Dimitrije Vukotić (MNE)	00

Round of 16
Yahor Varapayeu (BLR)	01
Klen-Kristofer Kaljulaid (EST)	00
Ushangi Margiani (GEO)	00
Theodoros Tselidis (GRE)	01

Quarterfinals
Yahor Varapayeu (BLR)	00
Theodoros Tselidis (GRE)	10

=== Pool B ===
First round
Egill Blöndal (ISL)	00
David Klammert (CZE)	01

Round of 32
Nemanja Majdov (SRB)	01
David Klammert (CZE)	00
Domenico Di Guida (ITA)	00
Jesper Smink (NED)	10
Krisztián Tóth (HUN)	10
Piotr Kuczera (POL)	00
Ramunas Diburys (LTU)	01
Batuhan Efemgil (TUR)	10

Round of 16
Nemanja Majdov (SRB)	10
Jesper Smink (NED)	00
Krisztián Tóth (HUN)	00
Batuhan Efemgil (TUR)	10

Quarterfinals
Nemanja Majdov (SRB)	10
Batuhan Efemgil (TUR)	00

=== Pool C ===
First round
Gábor Vér (HUN)	00
Quedjau Nhabali (UKR)	10

Round of 32
Beka Gviniashvili (GEO)	11
Jamal Petgrave (GBR)	00
Rafal Kozlowski (POL)	00
Jiří Petr (CZE)	10
Axel Clerget (FRA)	00
Mikhail Igolnikov (RUS)	10
Tiago Rodrigues (POR)	00
Quedjau Nhabali (UKR)	10

Round of 16
Beka Gviniashvili (GEO)	11
Jiří Petr (CZE)	01
Mikhail Igolnikov (RUS)	10
Quedjau Nhabali (UKR)	00

Quarterfinals
Beka Gviniashvili (GEO)	00
Mikhail Igolnikov (RUS)	01

=== Pool D ===
First round
Rijad Dedeić (BIH)	00
Eduard Şerban (ROU)	10
Dāvis Dūda (LAT)	00
Noël van 't End (NED)	10

Round of 32
Nikoloz Sherazadishvili (ESP)	10
Eduard Şerban (ROU)	00
Peter Žilka (SVK)	00
Nicholas Mungai (ITA)	01
Mammadali Mehdiyev (AZE)	00
Noël van 't End (NED)	01
Falk Petersilka (GER)	10
Li Kochman (ISR)	00

Round of 16
Nikoloz Sherazadishvili (ESP)	11
Nicholas Mungai (ITA)	00
Noël van 't End (NED)	10
Falk Petersilka (GER)	00

Quarterfinals
Nikoloz Sherazadishvili (ESP)	01
Noël van 't End (NED)	00
