= Judo at the 2019 European Games – Men's 90 kg =

Judo competition

Judo Men's 90 kg at the 2019 European Games
- Venue: Čyžoŭka-Arena
- Location: Minsk, Belarus
- Date: 24 June
- Competitors: 35 from 26 nations

Medalists
| gold medal | Mikail Özerler (1st title) | Turkey |
| silver medal | Li Kochman | Israel |
| bronze medal | Mammadali Mehdiyev | Azerbaijan |
| bronze medal | Khusen Khalmurzaev | Russia |

Competition at external databases
- Links: IJF • JudoInside

The men's 90 kg judo event at the 2019 European Games in Minsk was held on 24 June at the Čyžoŭka-Arena.

== Results ==
=== Finals ===
Semifinals
Khusen Khalmurzaev (RUS) | 00
Mikail Özerler (TUR) | 10
Li Kochman (ISR) | 10
Noël van 't End (NED) | 00

Final
Mikail Özerler (TUR) | 10
Li Kochman (ISR) | 00

=== Repechage ===
Repechage
Ciril Grossklaus (SUI) | 00
Mammadali Mehdiyev (AZE) | 10

Third place
Mammadali Mehdiyev (AZE) | 10
Noël van 't End (NED) | 00

Repechage
Milan Randl (SVK) | 01
Frazer Chamberlain (GBR) | 10

Third place
Frazer Chamberlain (GBR) | 00
Khusen Khalmurzaev (RUS) | 10

=== Pool A ===
Round of 64
David Klammert (CZE) | 10
Marko Bubanja (AUT) | 01

Round of 32
Nikoloz Sherazadishvili (ESP) | 01
Quedjau Nhabali (UKR) | 00
David Klammert (CZE) | 00
Ciril Grossklaus (SUI) | 10
Beka Gviniashvili (GEO) | 11
Klen-Kristofer Kaljulaid (EST) | 00
Joachim Bottieau (BEL) | 00
Khusen Khalmurzaev (RUS) | 10

Round of 16
Nikoloz Sherazadishvili (ESP) | 00
Ciril Grossklaus (SUI) | 01
Beka Gviniashvili (GEO) | 00
Khusen Khalmurzaev (RUS) | 01

Quarterfinals
Ciril Grossklaus (SUI) | 00
Khusen Khalmurzaev (RUS) | 10

=== Pool B ===
Round of 64
Yahor Varapayeu (BLR) | 01
Peter Žilka (SVK) | 00

Round of 32
Mammadali Mehdiyev (AZE) | 10
Yahor Varapayeu (BLR) | 00
Max Stewart (GBR) | 00
Aurelien Diesse (FRA) | 01
Aleksandar Kukolj (SRB) | 10
Piotr Kuczera (POL) | 00
Jesper Smink (NED) | 00
Mikail Özerler (TUR) | 10

Round of 16
Mammadali Mehdiyev (AZE) | 01
Aurelien Diesse (FRA) | 00
Aleksandar Kukolj (SRB) | 00
Mikail Özerler (TUR) | 10

Quarterfinals
Mammadali Mehdiyev (AZE) | 00
Mikail Özerler (TUR) | 10

=== Pool C ===
Round of 64
Li Kochman (ISR) | 10
Rafał Kozłowski (POL) | 00

Round of 32
Krisztián Tóth (HUN) | 11
Aatu Laamanen (FIN) | 00
Li Kochman (ISR) | 10
Raphael Schwendinger (LIE) | 00
Eduard Trippel (GER) | 00
Milan Randl (SVK) | 01
Mattias Kuusik (EST) | 00
Nicholas Mungai (ITA) | 10

Round of 16
Krisztián Tóth (HUN) | 00
Li Kochman (ISR) | 10
Milan Randl (SVK) | 01
Nicholas Mungai (ITA) | 00

Quarterfinals
Li Kochman (ISR) | 10
Milan Randl (SVK) | 00

=== Pool D ===
Round of 64

Round of 32
Nemanja Majdov (SRB) | 10
Mert Şişmanlar (TUR) | 00
Frazer Chamberlain (GBR) | 10
Viktar Kliavusau (BLR) | 00
Noël van 't End (NED) | 10
David Kukovica (SLO) | 00
Axel Clerget (FRA) | 10
Tiago Rodrigues (POR) | 00

Round of 16
Nemanja Majdov (SRB) | 00
Frazer Chamberlain (GBR) | 11
Noël van 't End (NED) | 10
Axel Clerget (FRA) | 00

Quarterfinals
Frazer Chamberlain (GBR) | 00
Noël van 't End (NED) | 10
