= 2022 European Judo Championships – Men's 90 kg =

Judo Men's 90 kg at the 2022 European Judo Championships
- Venue: Armeets Arena
- Location: Sofia, Bulgaria
- Date: 1 May
- Competitors: 34 from 25 nations

Medalists
gold medal	Luka Maisuradze (1st title)	Georgia
silver medal	Darko Brašnjović	Serbia
bronze medal	Mammadali Mehdiyev	Azerbaijan
bronze medal	Theodoros Tselidis	Greece

Competition at external databases
- Links: IJF • JudoInside

The men's 90 kg competition at the 2022 European Judo Championships was held on 1 May at the Armeets Arena.

== Results ==
=== Finals ===
Semi-finals
Theodoros Tselidis (GRE)	01
Darko Brašnjović (SRB)	11
Krisztián Tóth (HUN)	00
Luka Maisuradze (GEO)	10

Final
Darko Brašnjović (SRB)	00
Luka Maisuradze (GEO)	10

=== Repechage ===
Repechage
Mammadali Mehdiyev (AZE)	01
Jesper Smink (NED)	00
Christian Parlati (ITA)	10
Alex Creţ (ROU)	00

Bronze medal
Mammadali Mehdiyev (AZE)	10
Krisztián Tóth (HUN)	00
Christian Parlati (ITA)	00
Theodoros Tselidis (GRE)	10

=== Pool A ===
First round

Round of 32
Mammadali Mehdiyev (AZE)	10
David Klammert (CZE)	00
Roland Gőz (HUN)	00
Gennaro Pirelli (ITA)	10
Alexis Mathieu (FRA)	11
Milan Randl (SVK)	00
Toni Miletić (BIH)	00
Theodoros Tselidis (GRE)	10

Round of 16
Mammadali Mehdiyev (AZE)	11
Gennaro Pirelli (ITA)	00
Alexis Mathieu (FRA)	00
Theodoros Tselidis (GRE)	01

Quarterfinals
Mammadali Mehdiyev (AZE)	00
Theodoros Tselidis (GRE)	10

=== Pool B ===
First round
Andrej Chakarovski (MKD)	00
Johann Lenz (GER)	11

Round of 32
Mihael Žgank (TUR)	11
Anri Egutidze (POR)	00
Dorin Gotonoaga (MDA)	00
Darko Brašnjović (SRB)	10
Jesper Smink (NED)	01
Johann Lenz (GER)	00
Mattias Kuusik (EST)	00
Artem Bubyr (UKR)	10

Round of 16
Mihael Žgank (TUR)	00
Darko Brašnjović (SRB)	01
Jesper Smink (NED)	11
Artem Bubyr (UKR)	01

Quarterfinals
Darko Brašnjović (SRB)	10
Jesper Smink (NED)	00

=== Pool C ===
First round

Round of 32
Krisztián Tóth (HUN)	10
Roy Sivan (ISR)	00
Aleksejs Zarudņevs (LAT)	10
Aristos Michael (CYP)	00
Nemanja Majdov (SRB)	00
Christian Parlati (ITA)	10
Mantas Klimašauskas (LTU)	00
Ömer Aydın (TUR)	10

Round of 16
Krisztián Tóth (HUN)	01
Aleksejs Zarudņevs (LAT)	00
Christian Parlati (ITA)	10
Ömer Aydın (TUR)	01

Quarterfinals
Krisztián Tóth (HUN)	01
Christian Parlati (ITA)	00

=== Pool D ===
First round
M.-G. Ngayap-Hambou (FRA)	01
Wachid Borchashvili (AUT)	00

Round of 32
Luka Maisuradze (GEO)	01
Klen-Kristofer Kaljulaid (EST)	00
Iurie Mocanu (MDA)	00
Peter Zilka (SVK)	10
Noël van 't End (NED)	00
M.-G. Ngayap-Hambou (FRA)	10
Ivaylo Ivanov (BUL)	00
Alex Creţ (ROU)	10

Round of 16
Luka Maisuradze (GEO)	10
Peter Zilka (SVK)	00
M.-G. Ngayap-Hambou (FRA)	00
Alex Creţ (ROU)	01

Quarterfinals
Luka Maisuradze (GEO)	01
Alex Creţ (ROU)	00
