= Judo at the 2020 Summer Olympics – Men's 90 kg =

Judo competition

Men's 90 kg at the Games of the XXXII Olympiad
- Venue: Nippon Budokan
- Date: 28 July 2021
- Competitors: 33 from 33 nations

Medalists
1st place, gold medalist(s)		Lasha Bekauri	Georgia
2nd place, silver medalist(s)		Eduard Trippel	Germany
3rd place, bronze medalist(s)		Davlat Bobonov	Uzbekistan
3rd place, bronze medalist(s)		Krisztián Tóth	Hungary

The men's 90 kg competition in judo at the 2020 Summer Olympics in Tokyo was held on 28 July 2021 at the Nippon Budokan.

== Results ==
=== Finals ===
Semi-finals
8 Mikhail Igolnikov (ROC)	00
4 Lasha Bekauri (GEO)	01
Mihael Žgank (TUR)	00
Eduard Trippel (GER)	01

Gold medal
4 Lasha Bekauri (GEO)	01
Eduard Trippel (GER)	00

=== Repechage ===
Repechage
1 Nikoloz Sherazadishvili (ESP)	00
5 Davlat Bobonov (UZB)	01

Bronze medal
5 Davlat Bobonov (UZB)	10
Mihael Žgank (TUR)	00

Repechage
2 Noël van 't End (NED)	00
3 Krisztián Tóth (HUN)	01

Bronze medal
3 Krisztián Tóth (HUN)	01
8 Mikhail Igolnikov (ROC)	00

=== Pool A ===
Round of 64
Rafael Macedo (BRA)	00
Islam Bozbayev (KAZ)	10

Round of 32
1 Nikoloz Sherazadishvili (ESP)	01
Gantulgyn Altanbagana (MGL)	00
Nantenaina Finesse (SEY)	00
Marcus Nyman (SWE)	10
8 Mikhail Igolnikov (ROC)	10
Celtus Dossou Yovo (BEN)	00
Islam Bozbayev (KAZ)	00
Mammadali Mehdiyev (AZE)	01

Round of 16
1 Nikoloz Sherazadishvili (ESP)	10
Marcus Nyman (SWE)	00
8 Mikhail Igolnikov (ROC)	01
Mammadali Mehdiyev (AZE)	00

Quarter-finals
1 Nikoloz Sherazadishvili (ESP)	00
8 Mikhail Igolnikov (ROC)	10

=== Pool B ===
Round of 64

Round of 32
4 Lasha Bekauri (GEO)	10
Piotr Kuczera (POL)	00
David Klammert (CZE)	00
Li Kochman (ISR)	10
5 Davlat Bobonov (UZB)	01
Nicholas Mungai (ITA)	00
Robert Florentino (DOM)	00
Quedjau Nhabali (UKR)	01

Round of 16
4 Lasha Bekauri (GEO)	10
Li Kochman (ISR)	01
5 Davlat Bobonov (UZB)	10
Quedjau Nhabali (UKR)	00

Quarter-finals
4 Lasha Bekauri (GEO)	10
5 Davlat Bobonov (UZB)	00

=== Pool C ===
Round of 64

Round of 32
2 Noël van 't End (NED)	10
Paolo Persoglia (SMR)	00
Axel Clerget (FRA)	10
Komronshokh Ustopiriyon (TJK)	00
7 Iván Felipe Silva Morales (CUB)	00
Mihael Žgank (TUR)	01
Colton Brown (USA)	11
Raphael Schwendinger (LIE)	00

Round of 16
2 Noël van 't End (NED)	01
Axel Clerget (FRA)	00
Mihael Žgank (TUR)	01
Colton Brown (USA)	00

Quarter-finals
2 Noël van 't End (NED)	00
Mihael Žgank (TUR)	10

=== Pool D ===
Round of 64

Round of 32
3 Krisztián Tóth (HUN)	10
Popole Misenga (EOR)	00
Rémi Feuillet (MRI)	00
Shoichiro Mukai (JPN)	10
6 Nemanja Majdov (SRB)	00
Eduard Trippel (GER)	01
Gwak Dong-han (KOR)	10
Kwadjo Anani (GHA)	00

Round of 16
3 Krisztián Tóth (HUN)	10
Shoichiro Mukai (JPN)	00
Eduard Trippel (GER)	10
Gwak Dong-han (KOR)	00

Quarter-finals
3 Krisztián Tóth (HUN)	00
Eduard Trippel (GER)	10
