= Judo at the 2018 Mediterranean Games – Men's 90 kg =

Judo competition

Men's 90 kg at the 2018 Mediterranean Games
- Venue: Cambrils Pavilion
- Date: June 28, 2018; 8 years ago
- Competitors: 14 from 14 nations

Medalists
gold medal	Nikoloz Sherazadishvili	Spain
silver medal	Nemanja Majdov	Serbia
bronze medal	Nicholas Mungai	Italy
bronze medal	Theodoros Tselidis	Greece

The men's 90 kg competition in judo at the 2018 Mediterranean Games was held on 28 June 2018 at the Cambrils Pavilion in Cambrils.

== Schedule ==
All times are Central European Summer Time (UTC+2).

Date	Time	Round
June 28, 2018	10:00	Round of 16
June 28, 2018	11:12	Quarterfinals
June 28, 2018	12:32	Semifinals
June 28, 2018	13:20	Repechage
June 28, 2018	18:04	Bronze medal
June 28, 2018	18:12	Final

== Results ==
=== Main Round ===
Round of 16
Batuhan Efemgil (TUR)	10
David Kukovica (SLO)	00
Nicholas Mungai (ITA)	01
Aurélien Diesse (FRA)	00
Oussama Snoussi (TUN)	10
Karim Nsir Marquillo (AND)	00
Nacif Elias (LBN)	10
Georgios Kroussaniotakis (CYP)	00
Abderrahmane Benamadi (ALG)	00
João Martinho (POR)	10
Theodoros Tselidis (GRE)	11
Nicolas Grinda (MON)	00

Quarterfinals
Nikoloz Sherazadishvili (ESP)	10
Batuhan Efemgil (TUR)	01
Nicholas Mungai (ITA)	10
Oussama Snoussi (TUN)	00
Nemanja Majdov (SRB)	10
Nacif Elias (LBN)	00
João Martinho (POR)	00
Theodoros Tselidis (GRE)	10

Semifinals
Nikoloz Sherazadishvili (ESP)	10
Nicholas Mungai (ITA)	01
Nemanja Majdov (SRB)	01
Theodoros Tselidis (GRE)	00

Final
Nikoloz Sherazadishvili (ESP)	11
Nemanja Majdov (SRB)	01

=== Repechage ===
Repechage 1		Repechage 2		Bronze medal
		Batuhan Efemgil (TUR)	00
Aurélien Diesse (FRA)	00	Oussama Snoussi (TUN)	10
Oussama Snoussi (TUN)	10			Oussama Snoussi (TUN)	00
				Theodoros Tselidis (GRE)	11

Repechage 1		Repechage 2		Bronze medal
		Nacif Elias (LBN)	10
Nicolas Grinda (MON)	00	João Martinho (POR)	00
João Martinho (POR)	10			Nacif Elias (LBN)	00
				Nicholas Mungai (ITA)	10
