= 2018 Judo Grand Prix Hohhot =

Judo competition

Judo 2018 Judo Grand Prix Hohhot
- Venue: Inner Mongolia Stadium
- Location: Hohhot, China
- Dates: 25–27 May 2018
- Competitors: 361 from 46 nations

Competition at external databases
- Links: IJF • EJU • JudoInside

The 2018 Judo Grand Prix Hohhot was held at the Inner Mongolia Stadium in Hohhot, China, from 25 to 27 May 2018.

== Medal summary ==
=== Men's events ===
Event	Gold	Silver	Bronze
Extra-lightweight (−60 kg)	Yeldos Smetov (KAZ)	Gusman Kyrgyzbayev (KAZ)	Dashdavaagiin Amartüvshin (MGL)
Extra-lightweight (−60 kg)	Yeldos Smetov (KAZ)	Gusman Kyrgyzbayev (KAZ)	Albert Oguzov (RUS)
Half-lightweight (−66 kg)	Joshiro Maruyama (JPN)	Mikhail Pulyaev (RUS)	An Ba-ul (KOR)
Half-lightweight (−66 kg)	Joshiro Maruyama (JPN)	Mikhail Pulyaev (RUS)	Yeldos Zhumakanov (KAZ)
Lightweight (−73 kg)	An Chang-rim (KOR)	Soichi Hashimoto (JPN)	Tsend-Ochiryn Tsogtbaatar (MGL)
Lightweight (−73 kg)	An Chang-rim (KOR)	Soichi Hashimoto (JPN)	Anthony Zingg (GER)
Half-middleweight (−81 kg)	Takeshi Sasaki (JPN)	Khasan Khalmurzaev (RUS)	Lee Seung-su (KOR)
Half-middleweight (−81 kg)	Takeshi Sasaki (JPN)	Khasan Khalmurzaev (RUS)	Alan Khubetsov (RUS)
Middleweight (−90 kg)	Gwak Dong-han (KOR)	Gantulgyn Altanbagana (MGL)	Jesper Smink (NED)
Middleweight (−90 kg)	Gwak Dong-han (KOR)	Gantulgyn Altanbagana (MGL)	Theodoros Tselidis (GRE)
Half-heavyweight (−100 kg)	Cho Gu-ham (KOR)	Kazbek Zankishiev (RUS)	Joakim Dvärby (SWE)
Half-heavyweight (−100 kg)	Cho Gu-ham (KOR)	Kazbek Zankishiev (RUS)	Daiki Nishiyama (JPN)
Heavyweight (+100 kg)	Naidangiin Tüvshinbayar (MGL)	Ölziibayaryn Düürenbayar (MGL)	Rafael Silva (BRA)
Heavyweight (+100 kg)	Naidangiin Tüvshinbayar (MGL)	Ölziibayaryn Düürenbayar (MGL)	Bekmurod Oltiboev (UZB)

=== Women's events ===
Event	Gold	Silver	Bronze
Extra-lightweight (−48 kg)	Ami Kondo (JPN)	Kang Yu-jeong (KOR)	Mönkhbatyn Urantsetseg (MGL)
Extra-lightweight (−48 kg)	Ami Kondo (JPN)	Kang Yu-jeong (KOR)	Shira Rishony (ISR)
Half-lightweight (−52 kg)	Uta Abe (JPN)	Wu Shugen (CHN)	Park Da-sol (KOR)
Half-lightweight (−52 kg)	Uta Abe (JPN)	Wu Shugen (CHN)	Ana Pérez Box (ESP)
Lightweight (−57 kg)	Christa Deguchi (CAN)	Jessica Klimkait (CAN)	Kwon You-jeong (KOR)
Lightweight (−57 kg)	Christa Deguchi (CAN)	Jessica Klimkait (CAN)	Momo Tamaoki (JPN)
Half-middleweight (−63 kg)	Aimi Nouchi (JPN)	Gili Sharir (ISR)	Catherine Beauchemin-Pinard (CAN)
Half-middleweight (−63 kg)	Aimi Nouchi (JPN)	Gili Sharir (ISR)	Boldyn Gankhaich (MGL)
Middleweight (−70 kg)	Sanne van Dijke (NED)	Kelita Zupancic (CAN)	Chizuru Arai (JPN)
Middleweight (−70 kg)	Sanne van Dijke (NED)	Kelita Zupancic (CAN)	Gemma Howell (GBR)
Half-heavyweight (−78 kg)	Ruika Sato (JPN)	Mayra Aguiar (BRA)	Sama Hawa Camara (FRA)
Half-heavyweight (−78 kg)	Ruika Sato (JPN)	Mayra Aguiar (BRA)	Samanta Soares (BRA)
Heavyweight (+78 kg)	Akira Sone (JPN)	Kim Min-jeong (KOR)	Maria Suelen Altheman (BRA)
Heavyweight (+78 kg)	Akira Sone (JPN)	Kim Min-jeong (KOR)	Wang Yan (CHN)

Source Results

=== Medal table ===
* Host nation (China)

Rank	Nation	Gold	Silver	Bronze	Total
1	Japan (JPN)	7	1	3	11
2	South Korea (KOR)	3	2	4	9
3	Mongolia (MGL)	1	2	4	7
4	Canada (CAN)	1	2	1	4
5	Kazakhstan (KAZ)	1	1	1	3
6	Netherlands (NED)	1	0	1	2
7	Russia (RUS)	0	3	2	5
8	Brazil (BRA)	0	1	3	4
9	China (CHN)*	0	1	1	2
9	Israel (ISR)	0	1	1	2
11	France (FRA)	0	0	1	1
11	Germany (GER)	0	0	1	1
11	Great Britain (GBR)	0	0	1	1
11	Greece (GRE)	0	0	1	1
11	Spain (ESP)	0	0	1	1
11	Sweden (SWE)	0	0	1	1
11	Uzbekistan (UZB)	0	0	1	1
Totals (17 entries)		14	14	28	56
