= 2021 Judo Grand Slam Antalya =

Judo competition

Judo 2021 Judo Grand Slam Antalya
- Venue: Antalya Sports Hall
- Location: Antalya, Turkey
- Dates: 1–3 April 2021
- Competitors: 432 from 91 nations

Competition at external databases
- Links: IJF • EJU • JudoInside

The 2021 Judo Grand Slam Antalya was held at the Antalya Arena in Antalya, Turkey from 1 to 3 April 2021.

== Medal summary ==
=== Men's events ===
Event	Gold	Silver	Bronze
Extra-lightweight (−60 kg)	Jorre Verstraeten (BEL)	Walide Khyar (FRA)	Romaric Bouda (FRA)
Extra-lightweight (−60 kg)	Jorre Verstraeten (BEL)	Walide Khyar (FRA)	Yang Yung-wei (TPE)
Half-lightweight (−66 kg)	Hifumi Abe (JPN)	Alberto Gaitero (ESP)	Murad Chopanov (RUS)
Half-lightweight (−66 kg)	Hifumi Abe (JPN)	Alberto Gaitero (ESP)	Nijat Shikhalizada (AZE)
Lightweight (−73 kg)	Fabio Basile (ITA)	Bayram Kandemir (TUR)	Arthur Margelidon (CAN)
Lightweight (−73 kg)	Fabio Basile (ITA)	Bayram Kandemir (TUR)	Victor Sterpu (MDA)
Half-middleweight (−81 kg)	Vedat Albayrak (TUR)	Christian Parlati (ITA)	Attila Ungvári (HUN)
Half-middleweight (−81 kg)	Vedat Albayrak (TUR)	Christian Parlati (ITA)	Murad Fatiyev (AZE)
Middleweight (−90 kg)	Marcus Nyman (SWE)	Krisztián Tóth (HUN)	Li Kochman (ISR)
Middleweight (−90 kg)	Marcus Nyman (SWE)	Krisztián Tóth (HUN)	David Klammert (CZE)
Half-heavyweight (−100 kg)	Zelym Kotsoiev (AZE)	Aaron Wolf (JPN)	Grigori Minaškin (EST)
Half-heavyweight (−100 kg)	Zelym Kotsoiev (AZE)	Aaron Wolf (JPN)	Arman Adamian (RUS)
Heavyweight (+100 kg)	Tamerlan Bashaev (RUS)	Hisayoshi Harasawa (JPN)	Lukáš Krpálek (CZE)
Heavyweight (+100 kg)	Tamerlan Bashaev (RUS)	Hisayoshi Harasawa (JPN)	Stephan Hegyi (AUT)

Source Results

=== Women's events ===
Event	Gold	Silver	Bronze
Extra-lightweight (−48 kg)	Francesca Milani (ITA)	Francesca Giorda (ITA)	Shira Rishony (ISR)
Extra-lightweight (−48 kg)	Francesca Milani (ITA)	Francesca Giorda (ITA)	Gülkader Şentürk (TUR)
Half-lightweight (−52 kg)	Diyora Keldiyorova (UZB)	Estrella López Sheriff (ESP)	Gili Cohen (ISR)
Half-lightweight (−52 kg)	Diyora Keldiyorova (UZB)	Estrella López Sheriff (ESP)	Aleksandra Kaleta (POL)
Lightweight (−57 kg)	Christa Deguchi (CAN)	Jessica Klimkait (CAN)	Julia Kowalczyk (POL)
Lightweight (−57 kg)	Christa Deguchi (CAN)	Jessica Klimkait (CAN)	Lu Tongjuan (CHN)
Half-middleweight (−63 kg)	Lucy Renshall (GBR)	Anriquelis Barrios (VEN)	Tang Jing (CHN)
Half-middleweight (−63 kg)	Lucy Renshall (GBR)	Anriquelis Barrios (VEN)	Catherine Beauchemin-Pinard (CAN)
Middleweight (−70 kg)	Kim Polling (NED)	Barbara Matić (CRO)	Elvismar Rodríguez (VEN)
Middleweight (−70 kg)	Kim Polling (NED)	Barbara Matić (CRO)	María Bernabéu (ESP)
Half-heavyweight (−78 kg)	Shori Hamada (JPN)	Beata Pacut (POL)	Antonina Shmeleva (RUS)
Half-heavyweight (−78 kg)	Shori Hamada (JPN)	Beata Pacut (POL)	Vanessa Chalá (ECU)
Heavyweight (+78 kg)	Raz Hershko (ISR)	Xu Shiyan (CHN)	Hortence Vanessa Mballa Atangana (CMR)
Heavyweight (+78 kg)	Raz Hershko (ISR)	Xu Shiyan (CHN)	Nihel Cheikh Rouhou (TUN)

Source Results

=== Medal table ===
* Host nation (Turkey)

Rank	Nation	Gold	Silver	Bronze	Total
1	Italy (ITA)	2	2	0	4
1	Japan (JPN)	2	2	0	4
3	Canada (CAN)	1	1	2	4
4	Turkey (TUR)*	1	1	1	3
5	Israel (ISR)	1	0	3	4
5	Russia (RUS)	1	0	3	4
7	Azerbaijan (AZE)	1	0	2	3
8	Belgium (BEL)	1	0	0	1
8	Great Britain (GBR)	1	0	0	1
8	Netherlands (NED)	1	0	0	1
8	Sweden (SWE)	1	0	0	1
8	Uzbekistan (UZB)	1	0	0	1
13	Spain (ESP)	0	2	1	3
14	China (CHN)	0	1	2	3
14	Poland (POL)	0	1	2	3
16	France (FRA)	0	1	1	2
16	Hungary (HUN)	0	1	1	2
16	Venezuela (VEN)	0	1	1	2
19	Croatia (CRO)	0	1	0	1
20	Czech Republic (CZE)	0	0	2	2
21	Austria (AUT)	0	0	1	1
21	Cameroon (CMR)	0	0	1	1
21	Chinese Taipei (TPE)	0	0	1	1
21	Ecuador (ECU)	0	0	1	1
21	Estonia (EST)	0	0	1	1
21	Moldova (MDA)	0	0	1	1
21	Tunisia (TUN)	0	0	1	1
Totals (27 entries)		14	14	28	56

== Event videos ==
The event will air freely on the IJF YouTube channel.

	Weight classes	Preliminaries			Final Block
Day 1	Men: -60, -66 Women: -48, -52, -57	Commentated			Commentated
Day 1	Men: -60, -66 Women: -48, -52, -57	Tatami 1	Tatami 2	Tatami 3	Commentated
Day 2	Men: -73, -81 Women: -63, -70	Commentated			Commentated
Day 2	Men: -73, -81 Women: -63, -70	Tatami 1	Tatami 2	Tatami 3	Commentated
Day 3	Men: -90, -100, +100 Women: -78, +78	Commentated			Commentated
Day 3	Men: -90, -100, +100 Women: -78, +78	Tatami 1	Tatami 2	Tatami 3	Commentated
