= Luka Maisuradze =

Georgian judoka (born 1998)

Personal information
- Born: ლუკა მაისურაძე 30 January 1998 (age 28) Khashuri, Georgia
- Occupation: Judoka
- Height: 180 cm (5 ft 11 in)

Sport
- Country: Georgia
- Sport: Judo
- Weight class: ‍–‍81 kg / ‍–‍90 kg

Achievements and titles
- World Champ.: (gold) (2023)
- European Champ.: (gold) (2022, 2026)
Medal record
Men's judo
Representing Georgia
World Championships
Gold medal – first place	2023 Doha	‍–‍90 kg
Gold medal – first place	2025 Budapest	Mixed team
Bronze medal – third place	2019 Tokyo	‍–‍81 kg
Bronze medal – third place	2022 Tashkent	‍–‍90 kg
Bronze medal – third place	2023 Doha	Mixed team
Bronze medal – third place	2025 Budapest	‍–‍90 kg
Bronze medal – third place	2026 Baku	Mixed team
European Games
Bronze medal – third place	2019 Minsk	‍–‍81 kg
European Championships
Gold medal – first place	2022 Sofia	‍–‍90 kg
Gold medal – first place	2021 Ufa	Mixed team
Gold medal – first place	2025 Podgorica	Mixed team
Gold medal – first place	2026 Tbilisi	‍–‍90 kg
Bronze medal – third place	2020 Prague	‍–‍81 kg
World Masters
Silver medal – second place	2023 Budapest	‍–‍90 kg
Bronze medal – third place	2022 Jerusalem	‍–‍90 kg
IJF Grand Slam
Gold medal – first place	2026 Tbilisi	‍–‍90 kg
Silver medal – second place	2019 Abu Dhabi	‍–‍81 kg
Silver medal – second place	2022 Antalya	‍–‍90 kg
Silver medal – second place	2023 Tbilisi	‍–‍90 kg
Silver medal – second place	2023 Tokyo	‍–‍90 kg
Silver medal – second place	2024 Tokyo	‍–‍90 kg
Silver medal – second place	2025 Paris	‍–‍90 kg
Bronze medal – third place	2019 Ekaterinburg	‍–‍81 kg
Bronze medal – third place	2021 Kazan	‍–‍90 kg
Bronze medal – third place	2021 Paris	‍–‍90 kg
Bronze medal – third place	2021 Baku	‍–‍90 kg
Bronze medal – third place	2022 Baku	‍–‍90 kg
Bronze medal – third place	2023 Paris	‍–‍90 kg
IJF Grand Prix
Gold medal – first place	2019 Antalya	‍–‍81 kg
Silver medal – second place	2021 Zagreb	‍–‍90 kg
Silver medal – second place	2025 Zagreb	‍–‍90 kg
Bronze medal – third place	2020 Tel Aviv	‍–‍81 kg
European U23 Championships
Gold medal – first place	2020 Poreč	‍–‍90 kg
World Juniors Championships
Bronze medal – third place	2018 Nassau	‍–‍81 kg
European Junior Championships
Gold medal – first place	2018 Sofia	‍–‍81 kg
Silver medal – second place	2017 Maribor	‍–‍81 kg
Silver medal – second place	2017 Maribor	Mixed team

Profile at external databases
- IJF: 20518
- JudoInside.com: 89423
- Updated on 18 April 2026

Luka Maisuradze (Georgian: ლუკა მაისურაძე, born 30 January 1998, Khashuri, Georgia) is a Georgian judoka.

He won a bronze medal at the 2019 World Judo Championships.

In 2020, he won one of the bronze medals in the men's 81 kg event at the 2020 European Judo Championships held in Prague, Czech Republic.

In March 2024 he was suspended for doping.
