= 2019 Judo Grand Prix Tel Aviv =

Judo competition

Judo 2019 Judo Grand Prix Tel Aviv
- Venue: Drive in Arena
- Location: Tel Aviv, Israel
- Dates: 24–26 January 2019
- Competitors: 379 from 53 nations

Competition at external databases
- Links: IJF • EJU • JudoInside

The 2019 Judo Grand Prix Tel Aviv was held in Tel Aviv, Israel, from 24 to 26 January.

== Medal summary ==
=== Medal table ===
* Host nation (Israel)

Rank	Nation	Gold	Silver	Bronze	Total
1	Israel (ISR)*	4	2	1	7
2	Italy (ITA)	2	3	1	6
3	France (FRA)	2	0	1	3
4	Kosovo (KOS)	1	1	0	2
5	Azerbaijan (AZE)	1	0	1	2
5	Belarus (BLR)	1	0	1	2
5	Belgium (BEL)	1	0	1	2
5	Slovenia (SLO)	1	0	1	2
9	Sweden (SWE)	1	0	0	1
10	Ukraine (UKR)	0	4	1	5
11	Russia (RUS)	0	1	5	6
12	Netherlands (NED)	0	1	3	4
13	Bulgaria (BUL)	0	1	1	2
13	Ireland (IRL)	0	1	1	2
15	Great Britain (GBR)	0	0	2	2
16	Australia (AUS)	0	0	1	1
16	Brazil (BRA)	0	0	1	1
16	Estonia (EST)	0	0	1	1
16	Hungary (HUN)	0	0	1	1
16	Portugal (POR)	0	0	1	1
16	Romania (ROM)	0	0	1	1
16	Spain (ESP)	0	0	1	1
16	Switzerland (SUI)	0	0	1	1
Totals (23 entries)		14	14	28	56

=== Men's events ===
Event	Gold	Silver	Bronze
Extra-lightweight (-60 kg)	Jorre Verstraeten (BEL)	Tornike Tsjakadoea (NED)	Albert Oguzov (RUS)
Extra-lightweight (-60 kg)	Jorre Verstraeten (BEL)	Tornike Tsjakadoea (NED)	Cédric Revol (FRA)
Half-lightweight (-66 kg)	Manuel Lombardo (ITA)	Bogdan Iadov (UKR)	Islam Khametov (RUS)
Half-lightweight (-66 kg)	Manuel Lombardo (ITA)	Bogdan Iadov (UKR)	Alberto Gaitero Martin (ESP)
Lightweight (-73 kg)	Vadzim Shoka (BLR)	Giovanni Esposito (ITA)	Tohar Butbul (ISR)
Lightweight (-73 kg)	Vadzim Shoka (BLR)	Giovanni Esposito (ITA)	Artem Khomula (UKR)
Half-middleweight (-81 kg)	Sagi Muki (ISR)	Ivaylo Ivanov (BUL)	Sami Chouchi (BEL)
Half-middleweight (-81 kg)	Sagi Muki (ISR)	Ivaylo Ivanov (BUL)	Christian Parlati (ITA)
Middleweight (-90 kg)	Axel Clerget (FRA)	Nicholas Mungai (ITA)	Jesper Smink (NED)
Middleweight (-90 kg)	Axel Clerget (FRA)	Nicholas Mungai (ITA)	Mammadali Mehdiyev (AZE)
Half-heavyweight (-100 kg)	Alexandre Iddir (FRA)	Benjamin Fletcher (IRL)	Kayhan Ozcicek-Takagi (AUS)
Half-heavyweight (-100 kg)	Alexandre Iddir (FRA)	Benjamin Fletcher (IRL)	Grigori Minaškin (EST)
Heavyweight (+100 kg)	Or Sasson (ISR)	Iakiv Khammo (UKR)	Aliaksandr Vakhaviak (BLR)
Heavyweight (+100 kg)	Or Sasson (ISR)	Iakiv Khammo (UKR)	Anton Krivobokov (RUS)

=== Women's events ===
Event	Gold	Silver	Bronze
Extra-lightweight (-48 kg)	Shira Rishony (ISR)	Maryna Cherniak (UKR)	Éva Csernoviczki (HUN)
Extra-lightweight (-48 kg)	Shira Rishony (ISR)	Maryna Cherniak (UKR)	Nathalia Brigida (BRA)
Half-lightweight (-52 kg)	Majlinda Kelmendi (KOS)	Gili Cohen (ISR)	Fabienne Kocher (SUI)
Half-lightweight (-52 kg)	Majlinda Kelmendi (KOS)	Gili Cohen (ISR)	Andreea Chițu (ROM)
Lightweight (-57 kg)	Timna Nelson-Levy (ISR)	Daria Mezhetskaia (RUS)	Nekoda Smythe-Davis (GBR)
Lightweight (-57 kg)	Timna Nelson-Levy (ISR)	Daria Mezhetskaia (RUS)	Ivelina Ilieva (BUL)
Half-middleweight (-63 kg)	Maria Centracchio (ITA)	Inbal Shemesh (ISR)	Sanne Vermeer (NED)
Half-middleweight (-63 kg)	Maria Centracchio (ITA)	Inbal Shemesh (ISR)	Valentina Kostenko (RUS)
Middleweight (-70 kg)	Anna Bernholm (SWE)	Alice Bellandi (ITA)	Megan Fletcher (IRL)
Middleweight (-70 kg)	Anna Bernholm (SWE)	Alice Bellandi (ITA)	Sanne van Dijke (NED)
Half-heavyweight (-78 kg)	Klara Apotekar (SLO)	Loriana Kuka (KOS)	Katie-Jemima Yeats-Brown (GBR)
Half-heavyweight (-78 kg)	Klara Apotekar (SLO)	Loriana Kuka (KOS)	Aleksandra Babintseva (RUS)
Heavyweight (+78 kg)	Iryna Kindzerska (AZE)	Yelyzaveta Kalanina (UKR)	Anamari Velenšek (SLO)
Heavyweight (+78 kg)	Iryna Kindzerska (AZE)	Yelyzaveta Kalanina (UKR)	Rochele Nunes (POR)
