= Lasha Bekauri =

Georgian judoka (born 2000)

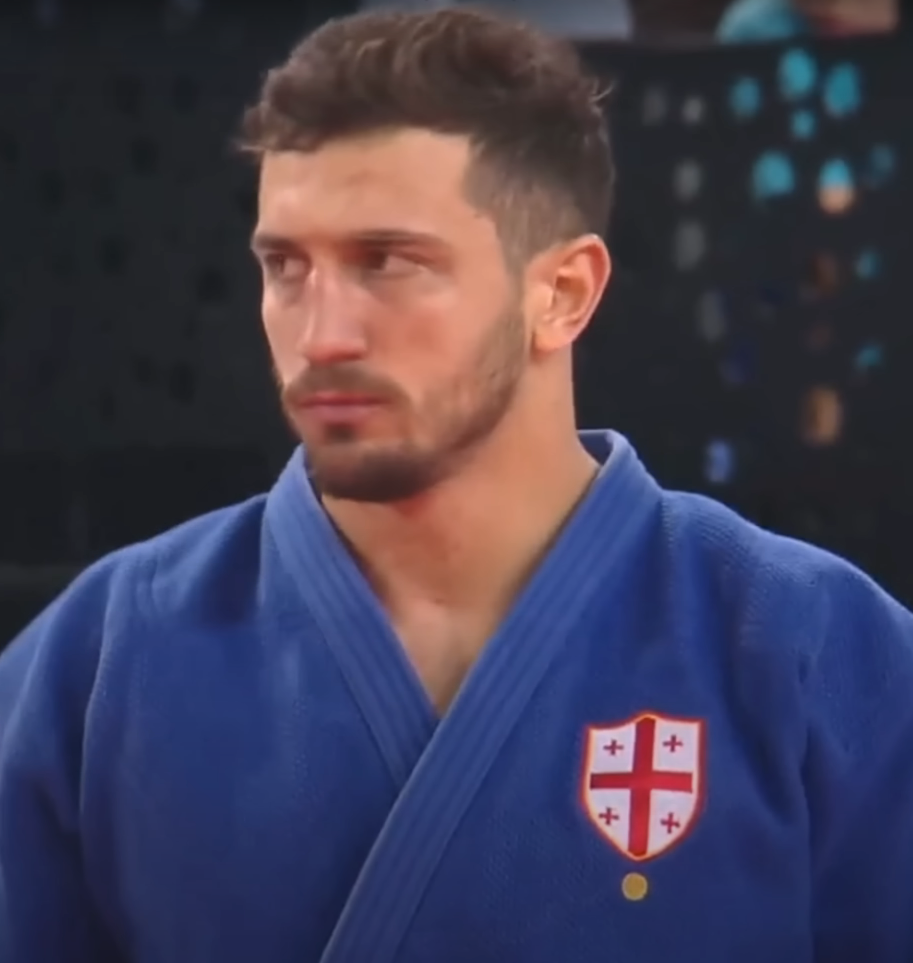
- Bekauri in 2023

Personal information
- Born: 26 July 2000 (age 26) Arkhiloskalo, Georgia
- Occupation: Judoka
- Height: 192 cm (6 ft 4 in)

Sport
- Country: Georgia
- Sport: Judo
- Weight class: ‍–‍90 kg

Achievements and titles
- Olympic Games: (gold) (2020, 2024)
- World Champ.: (silver) (2023)
- European Champ.: (gold) (2021)
- Highest world ranking: 1^{st}
Medal record
Men's judo
Representing Georgia
Olympic Games
Gold medal – first place	2020 Tokyo	‍–‍90 kg
Gold medal – first place	2024 Paris	‍–‍90 kg
World Championships
Gold medal – first place	2025 Budapest	Mixed team
Silver medal – second place	2023 Doha	‍–‍90 kg
Bronze medal – third place	2022 Tashkent	‍–‍90 kg
Bronze medal – third place	2023 Doha	Mixed team
Bronze medal – third place	2026 Baku	Mixed team
European Games
Gold medal – first place	2023 Kraków	Mixed team
European Championships
Gold medal – first place	2021 Lisbon	‍–‍90 kg
Silver medal – second place	2023 Montpellier	‍–‍90 kg
Silver medal – second place	2024 Zagreb	Mixed team
Bronze medal – third place	2024 Zagreb	‍–‍90 kg
World Masters
Gold medal – first place	2019 Qingdao	‍–‍90 kg
Gold medal – first place	2023 Budapest	‍–‍90 kg
Bronze medal – third place	2021 Doha	‍–‍90 kg
IJF Grand Slam
Gold medal – first place	2021 Tel Aviv	‍–‍90 kg
Gold medal – first place	2023 Tbilisi	‍–‍90 kg
Gold medal – first place	2024 Tbilisi	‍–‍90 kg
Gold medal – first place	2025 Abu Dhabi	‍–‍90 kg
Silver medal – second place	2026 Tashkent	‍–‍90 kg
Bronze medal – third place	2022 Tokyo	‍–‍90 kg
World Juniors Championships
Gold medal – first place	2018 Nassau	‍–‍90 kg
Gold medal – first place	2019 Marrakesh	‍–‍90 kg
Bronze medal – third place	2019 Marrakesh	Mixed team
European Junior Championships
Gold medal – first place	2019 Vantaa	‍–‍90 kg
World Cadets Championships
Gold medal – first place	2017 Santiago	‍–‍73 kg
Bronze medal – third place	2017 Santiago	Mixed team
European Cadet Championships
Gold medal – first place	2017 Kaunas	‍–‍73 kg
Summer Universiade
Silver medal – second place	2019 Naples	‍–‍90 kg

Profile at external databases
- IJF: 30263
- JudoInside.com: 103965
- Updated on 2 March 2026

Lasha Bekauri (born 26 July 2000) is a Georgian judoka. He won the gold medal in the men's 90 kg event at the 2020 Summer Olympics in Tokyo, Japan and the 2024 Summer Olympics in Paris, France. He also won the gold medal in his event at the 2019 and 2023 World Masters and the 2021 European Championships, as well as in the mixed team events at the 2023 European Games and 2025 World Championships.

== Career ==
Bekauri won the silver medal in the men's 90 kg event at the 2019 Summer Universiade held in Naples, Italy. In that same year, he won the gold medal in the men's 90 kg event at the 2019 Judo World Masters held in Qingdao, China.

Bekauri won one of the bronze medals in the men's 90 kg event at the 2021 Judo World Masters held in Doha, Qatar. A month later, he won the gold medal in his event at the 2021 Judo Grand Slam Tel Aviv held in Tel Aviv, Israel. A few months later, he also won the gold medal in his event at the 2021 European Judo Championships held in Lisbon, Portugal.

He won the gold medal in his event at 2024 Summer Olympics in Paris, France.

== Achievements ==
Year	Tournament	Place	Weight class
2021	European Championships	1st	−90 kg
2021	Olympic Games	1st	−90 kg
2022	World Championships	3rd	−90 kg
2023	World Championships	2nd	−90 kg
2023	European Championships	2nd	−90 kg
2024	European Championships	3rd	−90 kg
2024	Olympic Games	1st	−90 kg
