= Marcus Nyman =

Swedish judoka (born 1990)

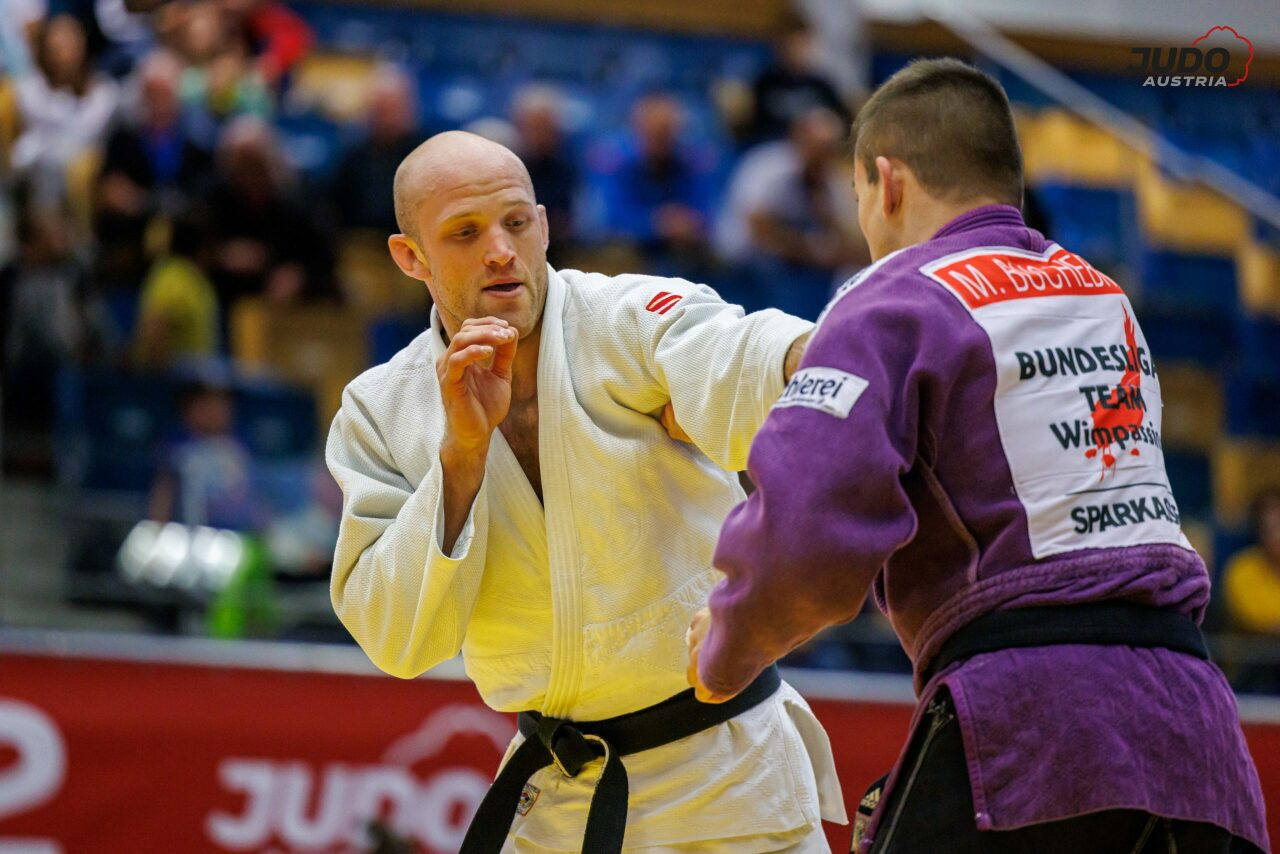
- Nyman (white) vs Mario Buchebner, 2022

Personal information
- Full name: Marcus Victor Jan Nyman
- Born: 14 August 1990 (age 35) Botkyrka, Sweden
- Occupation: Elevator mechanic
- Years active: 2010–2024
- Height: 1.89 m (6 ft 2 in)

Sport
- Country: Sweden
- Sport: Judo
- Weight class: –90 kg
- Rank: 2nd dan black belt
- League: Erste Judo Bundesliga (2010-2024)
- Club: Stockholmspolisens IF
- Team: JU Pinzgau (2010-2011); UJZ Mühlviertel (2012-2024); TSV Abensberg
- Coached by: Sally Conway
- Retired: 2024

Achievements and titles
- Olympic Games: 5th (2016)
- World Champ.: (bronze) (2021, 2023)
- European Champ.: (gold) (2010)
Medal record
Men's judo
Representing Sweden
World Championships
Bronze medal – third place	2021 Budapest	‍–‍90 kg
Bronze medal – third place	2023 Doha	‍–‍90 kg
European Championships
Gold medal – first place	2010 Vienna	‍–‍90 kg
Bronze medal – third place	2011 Istanbul	‍–‍90 kg
Bronze medal – third place	2016 Kazan	‍–‍90 kg
World Masters
Bronze medal – third place	2016 Guadalajara	‍–‍90 kg
IJF Grand Slam
Gold medal – first place	2016 Baku	‍–‍90 kg
Gold medal – first place	2016 Tyumen	‍–‍90 kg
Gold medal – first place	2021 Tbilisi	‍–‍90 kg
Gold medal – first place	2021 Antalya	‍–‍90 kg
Gold medal – first place	2022 Baku	‍–‍90 kg
Bronze medal – third place	2015 Abu Dhabi	‍–‍90 kg
IJF Grand Prix
Gold medal – first place	2011 Düsseldorf	‍–‍90 kg
Gold medal – first place	2016 Düsseldorf	‍–‍90 kg
Gold medal – first place	2019 Tashkent	‍–‍90 kg
Silver medal – second place	2011 Abu Dhabi	‍–‍90 kg
Silver medal – second place	2016 Tbilisi	‍–‍90 kg
Bronze medal – third place	2010 Qingdao	‍–‍90 kg
Bronze medal – third place	2011 Amsterdam	‍–‍90 kg
World Juniors Championships
Bronze medal – third place	2008 Bangkok	‍–‍90 kg
European Junior Championships
Gold medal – first place	2009 Yerevan	‍–‍90 kg

Profile at external databases
- IJF: 1285
- JudoInside.com: 41435
- Updated on 17 May 2023

Marcus Victor Jan Nyman (born 14 August 1990) is a Swedish retired judoka. He competed in the men's −90 kg judo event. In his olympic debut at the 2012 Summer Olympics he was eliminated after losing his first match. In the 2016 Summer Olympics he won three of five matches and finished fifth. At the 2020 Summer Olympics and the 2024 Summer Olympics, Nyman was eliminated in the second round. Nyman won the gold medal at the 2010 European Judo Championships and the bronze medal at the 2011 and 2016 Championships. He also finished third at the World Championships in 2021 and 2023.

After the 2024 Summer Olympics, Nyman ended his judo career and resumed his occupation as an elevator mechanic.
