= Mikhail Igolnikov =

Russian judoka (born 1996)

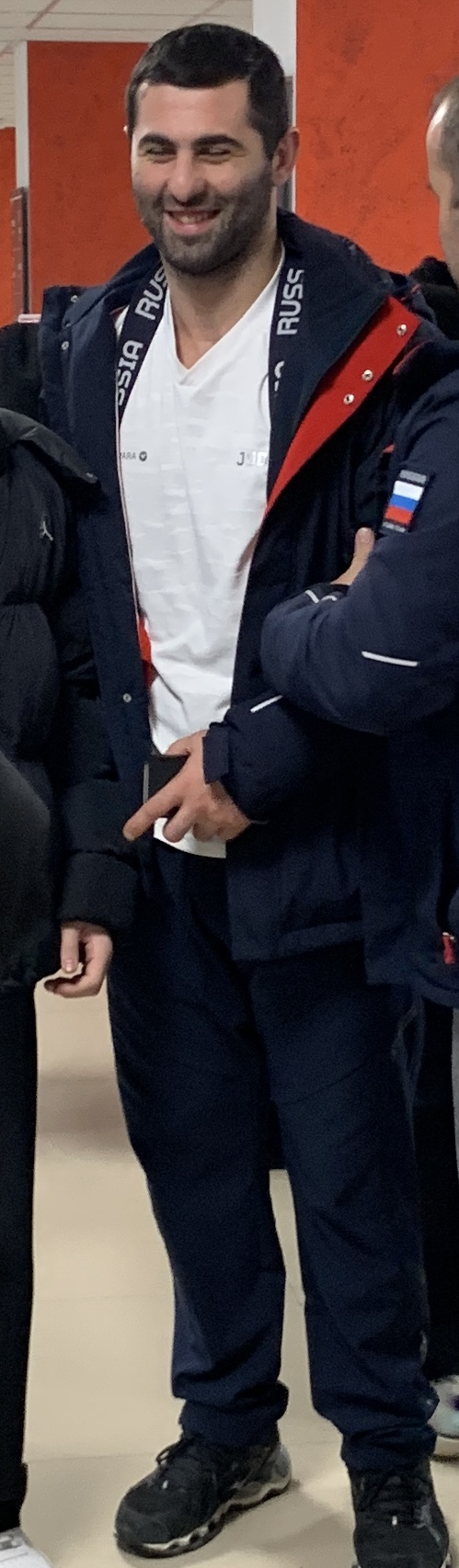

Personal information
- Native name: Михаил Сергеевич Игольников
- Full name: Mikhail Sergeevich Igolnikov
- Born: 15 October 1996 (age 29) Tuapse, Krasnodar Krai, Russian Federation
- Home town: Krasnodar, Russian Federation
- Occupation: Judoka
- Height: 175 cm (5 ft 9 in)
- Military career
- Allegiance: Russia
- Branch: Russian Armed Forces
- Rank: Lieutenant

Sport
- Country: Russia
- Sport: Judo
- Weight class: ‍–‍90 kg
- Rank: Honored Master of Sport in Judo
- Club: CSKA
- Coached by: Dzhanbolet Naguchev

Achievements and titles
- Olympic Games: 5th (2020)
- World Champ.: R32 (2018)
- European Champ.: (gold) (2018, 2020)
Medal record
Men's judo
Representing Individual Neutral Athletes
IJF Grand Slam
Gold medal – first place	2023 Ulaanbaatar	‍–‍90 kg
Gold medal – first place	2023 Baku	‍–‍90 kg
Bronze medal – third place	2023 Tokyo	‍–‍90 kg
Representing the IJF
IJF Grand Slam
Gold medal – first place	2022 Ulaanbaatar	‍–‍90 kg
Gold medal – first place	2025 Astana	‍–‍90 kg
Representing Russia
European Championships
Gold medal – first place	2018 Tel Aviv	‍–‍90 kg
Gold medal – first place	2020 Prague	‍–‍90 kg
Bronze medal – third place	2021 Lisbon	‍–‍90 kg
World Masters
Bronze medal – third place	2018 Guangzhou	‍–‍90 kg
IJF Grand Slam
Gold medal – first place	2018 Düsseldorf	‍–‍90 kg
Gold medal – first place	2018 Abu Dhabi	‍–‍90 kg
Gold medal – first place	2020 Budapest	‍–‍90 kg
Bronze medal – third place	2019 Düsseldorf	‍–‍90 kg
IJF Grand Prix
Gold medal – first place	2019 Perth	‍–‍90 kg
Silver medal – second place	2017 Tbilisi	‍–‍90 kg
European U23 Championships
Gold medal – first place	2017 Podgorica	‍–‍90 kg
World Juniors Championships
Silver medal – second place	2014 Fort Lauderdale	‍–‍81 kg
European Junior Championships
Gold medal – first place	2016 Málaga	‍–‍90 kg
Bronze medal – third place	2015 Oberwart	‍–‍90 kg
World Cadets Championships
Gold medal – first place	2011 Kyiv	‍–‍66 kg
Bronze medal – third place	2013 Miami	‍–‍81 kg
European Cadet Championships
Gold medal – first place	2011 Cottonera	‍–‍66 kg
Gold medal – first place	2012 Bar	‍–‍81 kg
Gold medal – first place	2013 Tallinn	‍–‍81 kg
Youth Olympic Games
Gold medal – first place	2014 Nanjing	‍–‍81 kg
Military World Games
Gold medal – first place	2019 Wuhan	‍–‍90 kg
Gold medal – first place	2019 Wuhan	Team

Profile at external databases
- IJF: 8217
- JudoInside.com: 65091
- Updated on 11 May 2025

Mikhail Sergeevich Igolnikov (Russian: Михаил Сергеевич Игольников; born 15 October 1996) is a Russian judoka. Igolnikov competes at the ‍–‍90 kg category, representing Russia and is a two-time European Champion; winning his first European title in 2018 and his second in 2020.

== Background ==
Igolnikov is a student in physical culture and sports at Kuban State University. Igolnikov is a Lieutenant of the Russian Armed Forces and a member of the army sports club CSKA Moscow and a gold medal winner of the World Military Games.

== Accomplishments in Judo ==
2014
(silver) U21 World Championships, Fort Lauderdale
2015
(bronze) U21 European Championships, Oberwart
2016
(gold) U21 European Championships, Málaga
2017
(silver) Grand Prix, Tbilisi
(gold) U23 European Championships, Podgorica
2018
(gold) Grand Slam, Düsseldorf
(gold) Grand Slam, Abu Dhabi
(gold) Senior European Championships, Tel Aviv
(bronze) World Masters, Guangzhou
2019
(bronze) Grand Slam, Düsseldorf
2020
(gold) Grand Slam, Budapest
(gold) Senior European Championships, Prague
