= Davlat Bobonov =

Uzbekistani judoka (born 1997)

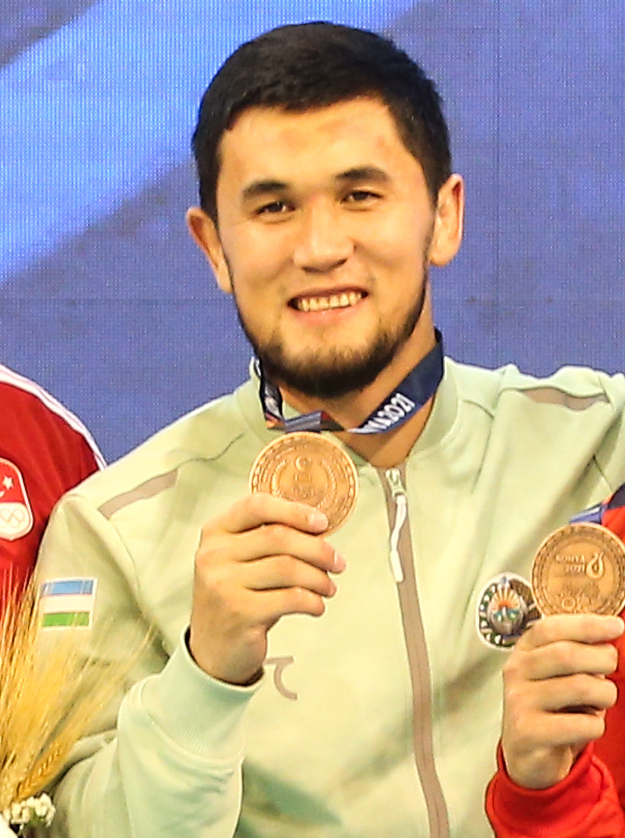
- Bobonov in 2022

Personal information
- Nationality: Uzbek
- Born: 7 June 1997 (age 29) Nurota, Uzbekistan
- Occupation: Judoka

Sport
- Country: Uzbekistan
- Sport: Judo
- Weight class: ‍–‍90 kg

Achievements and titles
- Olympic Games: (bronze) (2020)
- World Champ.: (2022)
- Asian Champ.: (gold) (2021)
Medal record
Men's judo
Representing Uzbekistan
Olympic Games
Bronze medal – third place	2020 Tokyo	‍–‍90 kg
World Championships
Gold medal – first place	2022 Tashkent	‍–‍90 kg
Silver medal – second place	2021 Budapest	‍–‍90 kg
Bronze medal – third place	2021 Budapest	Mixed team
Asian Games
Silver medal – second place	2023 Hangzhou	‍–‍90 kg
Silver medal – second place	2023 Hangzhou	Mixed team
Asian Championships
Gold medal – first place	2021 Bishkek	‍–‍90 kg
World Masters
Bronze medal – third place	2023 Budapest	‍–‍90 kg
IJF Grand Slam
Gold medal – first place	2020 Düsseldorf	‍–‍90 kg
Gold medal – first place	2023 Tashkent	‍–‍90 kg
Silver medal – second place	2019 Osaka	‍–‍90 kg
Silver medal – second place	2021 Tashkent	‍–‍90 kg
Silver medal – second place	2022 Ulaanbaatar	‍–‍90 kg
Bronze medal – third place	2021 Tbilisi	‍–‍90 kg
Bronze medal – third place	2021 Abu Dhabi	‍–‍90 kg
Bronze medal – third place	2022 Paris	‍–‍90 kg
Bronze medal – third place	2024 Tashkent	‍–‍90 kg
IJF Grand Prix
Gold medal – first place	2016 Tashkent	‍–‍81 kg
Asian Cadet Championships
Bronze medal – third place	2014 Hong Kong	‍–‍73 kg
Summer Universiade
Bronze medal – third place	2019 Naples	Open
Islamic Solidarity Games
Bronze medal – third place	2017 Baku	‍–‍81 kg
Bronze medal – third place	2017 Baku	Men's team
Bronze medal – third place	2021 Konya	‍–‍90 kg

Profile at external databases
- IJF: 25415
- JudoInside.com: 93311
- Updated on 3 March 2024

Davlat Bobonov (born 7 June 1997) is an Uzbek judoka. He won one of the bronze medals in the men's 90 kg event at the 2020 Summer Olympics in Tokyo, Japan.

He is the 2020 Judo Grand Slam Düsseldorf gold medallist in the −90 kg class.

He won one of the bronze medals in his event at the 2022 Judo Grand Slam Paris held in Paris, France.
