= Islam Bozbayev =

Kazakhstani judoka (born 1991)

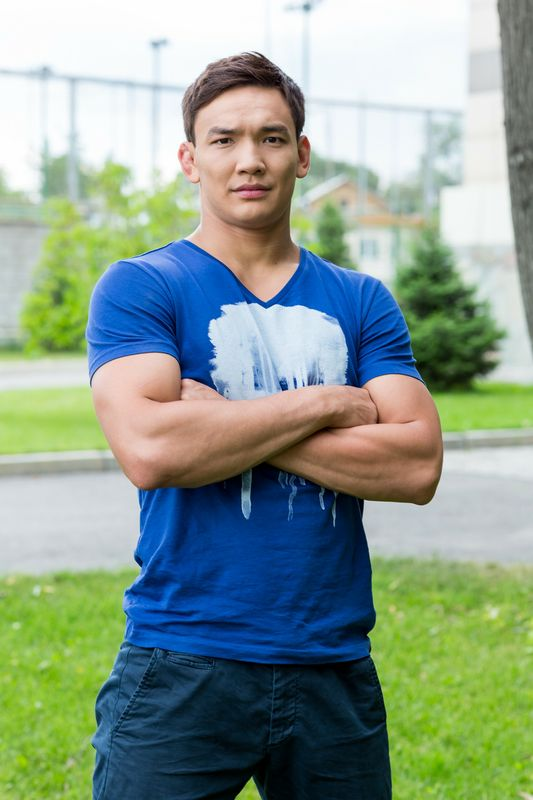

Personal information
- Nationality: Kazakhstani
- Born: 11 June 1991 (age 35) Temirtau, Kazakh SSR, Soviet Union
- Occupation: Judoka

Sport
- Country: Kazakhstan
- Sport: Judo
- Weight class: –81 kg, –90 kg, –100 kg

Achievements and titles
- Olympic Games: R16 (2012)
- World Champ.: 7th (2021)
- Asian Champ.: (silver) (2010, 2011, 2017, 2022)
Medal record
Men's judo
Representing Kazakhstan
Asian Games
Bronze medal – third place	2010 Guangzhou	‍–‍81 kg
Asian Championships
Silver medal – second place	2011 Abu Dhabi	‍–‍81 kg
Silver medal – second place	2017 Hong Kong	‍–‍90 kg
Silver medal – second place	2022 Nur‑Sultan	‍–‍100 kg
Bronze medal – third place	2013 Bangkok	‍–‍90 kg
Bronze medal – third place	2019 Fujairah	‍–‍90 kg
World Masters
Bronze medal – third place	2018 Guangzhou	‍–‍90 kg
IJF Grand Slam
Gold medal – first place	2017 Baku	‍–‍90 kg
Silver medal – second place	2019 Paris	‍–‍90 kg
Bronze medal – third place	2011 Moscow	‍–‍81 kg
Bronze medal – third place	2012 Tokyo	‍–‍90 kg
Bronze medal – third place	2023 Astana	‍–‍100 kg
IJF Grand Prix
Gold medal – first place	2013 Almaty	‍–‍90 kg
Gold medal – first place	2018 Tunis	‍–‍90 kg
Bronze medal – third place	2015 Samsun	‍–‍90 kg
Asian Junior Championships
Bronze medal – third place	2008 Sana'a	‍–‍73 kg

Profile at external databases
- IJF: 2539
- JudoInside.com: 53795
- Updated on 18 June 2023

Islam Bozbayev (born 11 June 1991 in Temirtau) is a Kazakh judoka who won the bronze medal in the men's under 81 kg class at the 2010 Asian Games. He competed in the same division at the 2012 Summer Olympics.
