= Axel Clerget =

French judoka (born 1987)

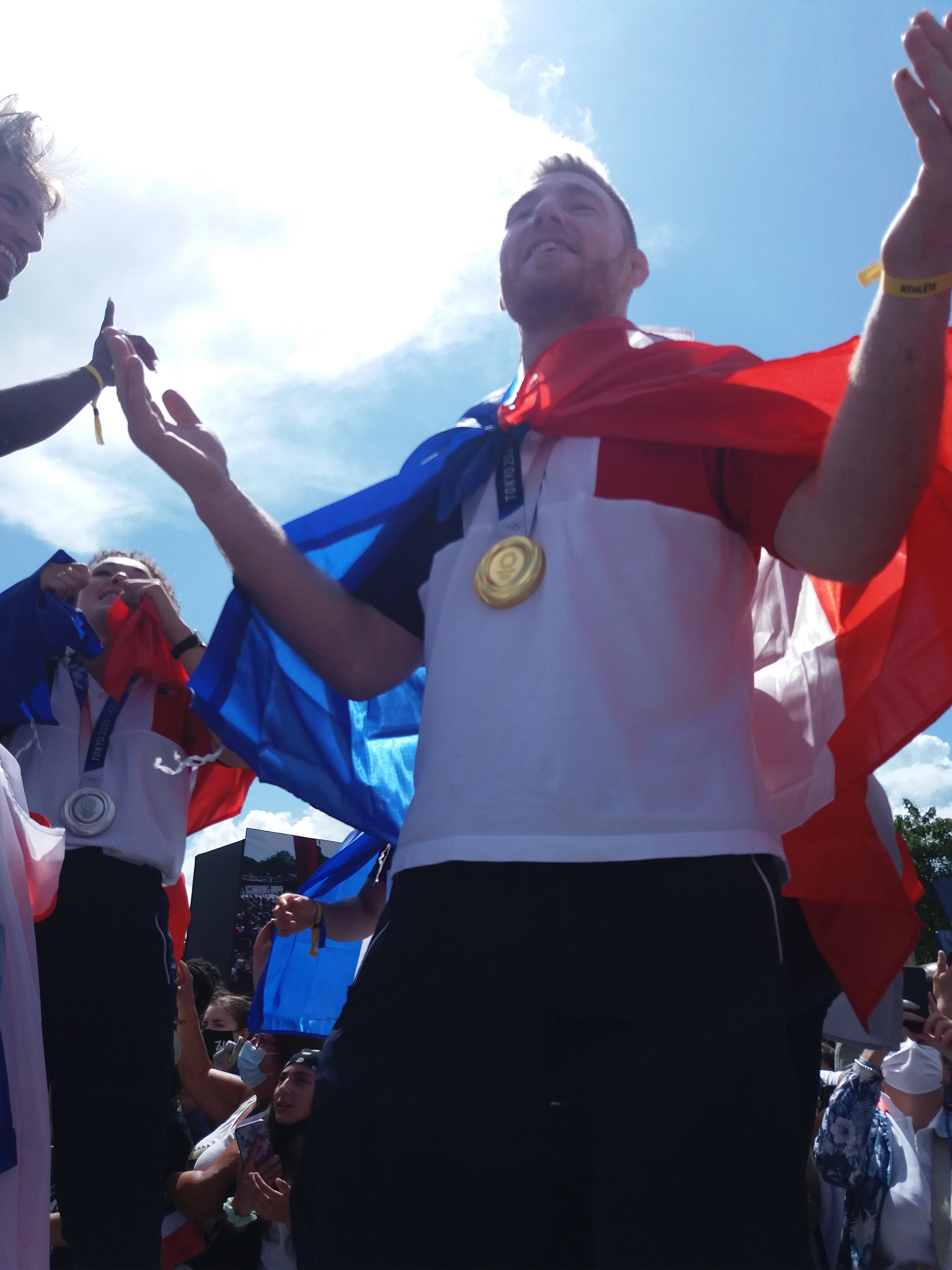
- Clerget in 2021

Personal information
- Born: 28 February 1987 (age 39) Saint-Dizier, France
- Occupation: Judoka
- Height: 1.84 m (6 ft 0 in)

Sport
- Country: France
- Sport: Judo
- Weight class: –90 kg

Achievements and titles
- Olympic Games: R16 (2020)
- World Champ.: (bronze) (2018, 2019)
- European Champ.: (silver) (2017)
Medal record
Men's judo
Representing France
Olympic Games
Gold medal – first place	2020 Tokyo	Mixed team
World Championships
Gold medal – first place	2011 Paris	Men's team
Silver medal – second place	2024 Abu Dhabi	Mixed team
Bronze medal – third place	2018 Baku	‍–‍90 kg
Bronze medal – third place	2019 Tokyo	‍–‍90 kg
European Championships
Silver medal – second place	2017 Warsaw	‍–‍90 kg
World Masters
Silver medal – second place	2010 Suwon	‍–‍81 kg
IJF Grand Slam
Silver medal – second place	2016 Abu Dhabi	‍–‍90 kg
Silver medal – second place	2016 Tokyo	‍–‍90 kg
Silver medal – second place	2017 Paris	‍–‍90 kg
Bronze medal – third place	2009 Paris	‍–‍81 kg
Bronze medal – third place	2016 Baku	‍–‍90 kg
Bronze medal – third place	2018 Paris	‍–‍90 kg
Bronze medal – third place	2020 Paris	‍–‍90 kg
Bronze medal – third place	2023 Astana	‍–‍90 kg
IJF Grand Prix
Gold medal – first place	2016 Almaty	‍–‍90 kg
Gold medal – first place	2019 Tel Aviv	‍–‍90 kg
Silver medal – second place	2015 Jeju	‍–‍90 kg
Silver medal – second place	2023 Linz	‍–‍90 kg
Bronze medal – third place	2023 Almada	‍–‍90 kg
European U23 Championships
Bronze medal – third place	2007 Salzburg	‍–‍81 kg
Bronze medal – third place	2008 Zagreb	‍–‍81 kg
World Juniors Championships
Bronze medal – third place	2006 Santo Domingo	‍–‍81 kg

Profile at external databases
- IJF: 379
- JudoInside.com: 28294
- Updated on 25 May 2024

Axel Clerget (born 28 February 1987) is a French judoka. He is the 2017 European silver medalist in the ‍–‍90 kg division.
