= Li Kochman =

Israeli judoka (born 1995)

Personal information
- Native name: לי קוכמן
- Nationality: Israeli
- Born: 18 April 1995 (age 31)
- Occupation: Judoka

Sport
- Country: Israel
- Sport: Judo
- Weight class: ‍–‍90 kg
- Rank: 2nd dan black belt
- Retired: 2024

Achievements and titles
- Olympic Games: R16 (2020)
- World Champ.: R16 (2019, 2021)
- European Champ.: (silver) (2019)
- Highest world ranking: 11^{th}
Medal record
Men's judo
Representing Israel
Olympic Games
Bronze medal – third place	2020 Tokyo	Mixed team
European Games
Silver medal – second place	2019 Minsk	‍–‍90 kg
IJF Grand Slam
Bronze medal – third place	2021 Antalya	‍–‍90 kg
IJF Grand Prix
Silver medal – second place	2016 Zagreb	‍–‍90 kg
Bronze medal – third place	2015 Budapest	‍–‍90 kg
Bronze medal – third place	2018 Tbilisi	‍–‍90 kg
Bronze medal – third place	2024 Linz	‍–‍90 kg
European U23 Championships
Bronze medal – third place	2014 Wrocław	‍–‍90 kg
European Cadet Championships
Bronze medal – third place	2011 Cottonera	‍–‍90 kg

Profile at external databases
- IJF: 8388
- JudoInside.com: 32116
- Updated on 10 March 2024

Li Kochman (or Lee, Hebrew: לי קוכמן; Born 18 April 1995) is an Israeli retired judoka. He competed in the under 90 kg weight category, and won a silver medal in the 2019 European Judo Championships.

== Judo career ==
=== 2011–19 ===
Kochman won a bronze medal at the 2011 European Cadet Championships (U-17). He also won a bronze medal at the 2014 European U23 Championships.

Kochman won bronze at the 2015 Budapest Grand Prix (‍–‍90 kg) and a silver medal at the 2016 Zagreb Grand Prix.

In 2017 Kochman won the gold medal at the European Open in Belgrade. That year he lost in the finals of the European Open in Minsk and the European Open in Bucharest.

In 2018 Kochman won a silver medal at the European Open in Sofia. That year he also won a bronze medal at the 2018 Tbilisi Grand Prix.

Kochman won a silver medal at the 2019 European Games in Minsk.

=== 2020–present ===
Kochman represented Israel at the 2020 Summer Olympics, competing at the men's 90 kg weight category. After beating Czech David Klammert in his first match, Kochman lost to the reigning European champion, Georgian Lasha Bekauri in the round of 16, ending his part of the individual contest. Bekauri went on to win the gold medal.

== Titles ==
Year	Tournament	Place	Ref.
2015	Grand Prix Budapest	3rd place, bronze medalist(s)	
2016	Grand Prix Zagreb	2nd place, silver medalist(s)	
2018	Grand Prix Tbilisi	3rd place, bronze medalist(s)	
2019	European Games	2nd place, silver medalist(s)	
2021	Grand Slam Antalya	3rd place, bronze medalist(s)	

== See also ==
- List of Jewish Olympic medalists
