= Eduard Trippel =

German judoka (born 1997)

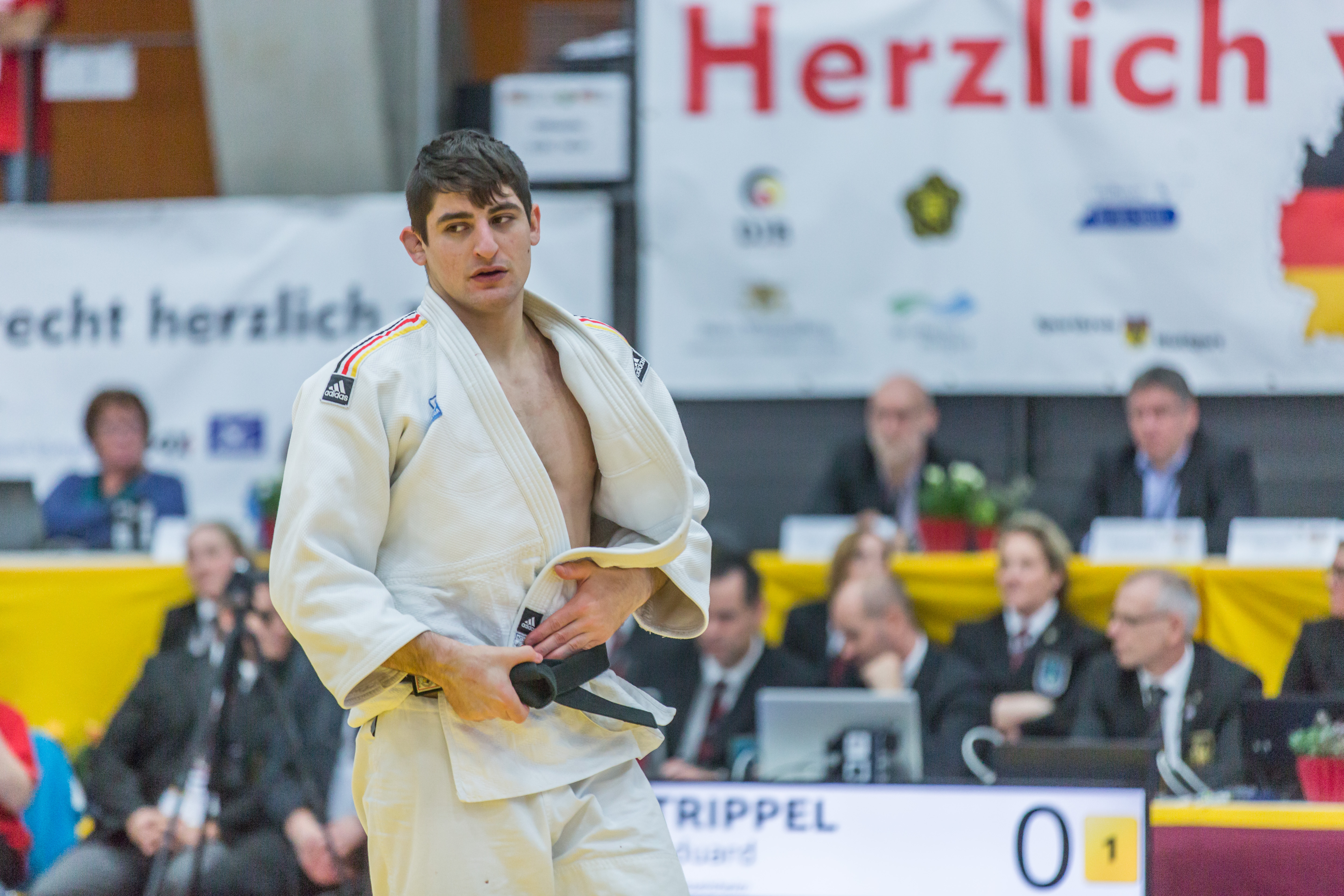
- Trippel in 2019

Personal information
- Born: 26 March 1997 (age 29) Rüsselsheim, Germany
- Occupation: Judoka
- Height: 187 cm (6 ft 2 in)

Sport
- Country: Germany
- Sport: Judo
- Weight class: ‍–‍90 kg
- Club: JC Rüsselsheim

Achievements and titles
- Olympic Games: (silver) (2020)
- World Champ.: 5th (2018)
- European Champ.: R32 (2017, 2019, 2020, 2024, 2025)
Medal record
Men's judo
Representing Germany
Olympic Games
Silver medal – second place	2020 Tokyo	‍–‍90 kg
Bronze medal – third place	2020 Tokyo	Mixed team
World Championships
Bronze medal – third place	2022 Tashkent	Mixed team
Bronze medal – third place	2025 Budapest	Mixed team
European Games
Silver medal – second place	2023 Kraków	Mixed team
World Masters
Bronze medal – third place	2021 Doha	‍–‍90 kg
IJF Grand Slam
Silver medal – second place	2021 Kazan	‍–‍90 kg
Silver medal – second place	2022 Tokyo	‍–‍90 kg
Silver medal – second place	2024 Astana	‍–‍90 kg
Bronze medal – third place	2018 Paris	‍–‍90 kg
Bronze medal – third place	2018 Osaka	‍–‍90 kg
Bronze medal – third place	2019 Abu Dhabi	‍–‍90 kg
IJF Grand Prix
Silver medal – second place	2019 Marrakesh	‍–‍90 kg
Bronze medal – third place	2018 Tashkent	‍–‍90 kg
Bronze medal – third place	2022 Zagreb	‍–‍90 kg
World Juniors Championships
Bronze medal – third place	2017 Zagreb	‍–‍90 kg
European Cadet Championships
Bronze medal – third place	2014 Athens	‍–‍81 kg

Profile at external databases
- IJF: 19907
- JudoInside.com: 84785
- Updated on 21 June 2025

Eduard Trippel (born 26 March 1997) is a German judoka. He won the silver medal in the men's 90 kg event at the 2020 Summer Olympics in Tokyo, Japan. He also won one of the bronze medals in the mixed team event. He competed at the World Judo Championships in 2018, 2019 and 2021. He is holder of the 4th Dan.

== Career ==
Trippel competed in the men's 90 kg and men's team events at the 2017 European Judo Championships held in Warsaw, Poland. In 2020, he competed in the men's 90 kg event at the European Judo Championships held in Prague, Czech Republic.

In 2021, Trippel won one of the bronze medals in his event at the Judo World Masters held in Doha, Qatar.
