= Christian Parlati =

Italian judoka (born 1998)

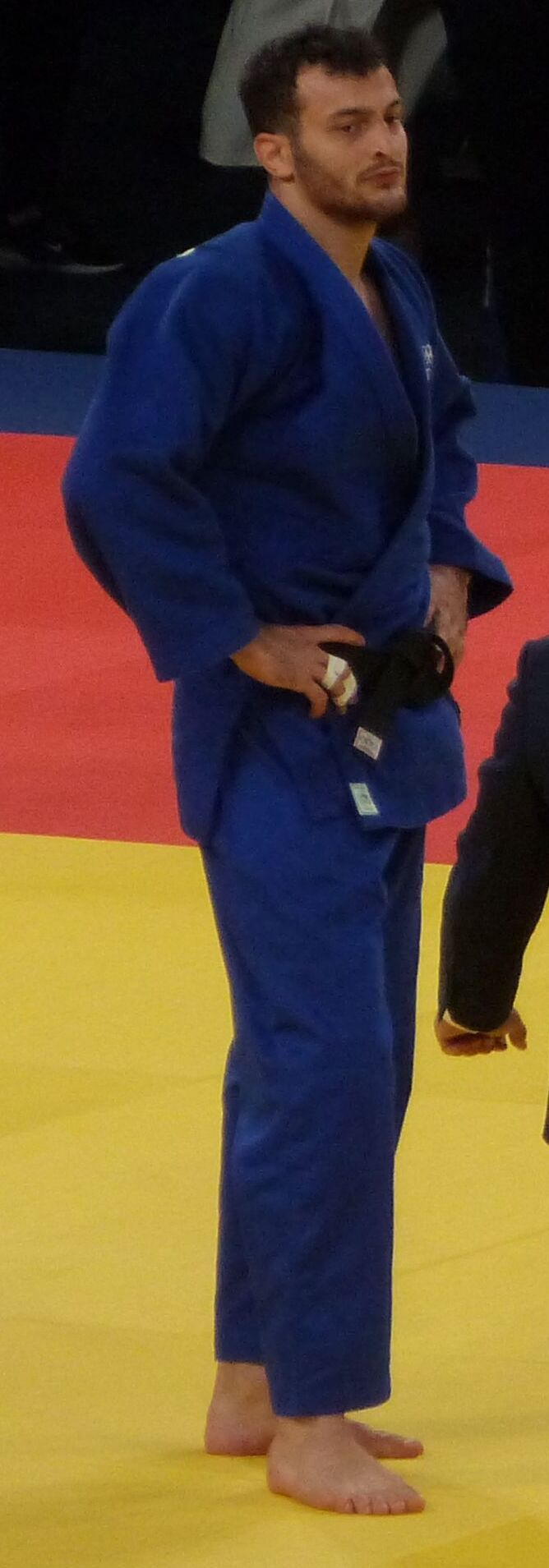

Personal information
- Born: 23 January 1998 (age 28) Naples, Italy
- Occupation: Judoka

Sport
- Country: Italy
- Sport: Judo
- Weight class: ‍–‍81 kg, ‍–‍90 kg

Achievements and titles
- Olympic Games: R16 (2020)
- World Champ.: (silver) (2022)
- European Champ.: (gold) (2025)
Medal record
Men's judo
Representing Italy
World Championships
Silver medal – second place	2022 Tashkent	‍–‍90 kg
Bronze medal – third place	2024 Abu Dhabi	Mixed team
European Games
Bronze medal – third place	2023 Kraków	Mixed team
European Championships
Gold medal – first place	2025 Podgorica	‍–‍90 kg
Silver medal – second place	2025 Podgorica	Mixed team
Bronze medal – third place	2021 Lisbon	‍–‍81 kg
IJF Grand Slam
Gold medal – first place	2021 Tashkent	‍–‍81 kg
Silver medal – second place	2021 Antalya	‍–‍81 kg
Silver medal – second place	2022 Budapest	‍–‍90 kg
Bronze medal – third place	2022 Baku	‍–‍90 kg
Bronze medal – third place	2023 Tokyo	‍–‍90 kg
Bronze medal – third place	2024 Tashkent	‍–‍90 kg
IJF Grand Prix
Gold medal – first place	2025 Guadalajara	‍–‍90 kg
Silver medal – second place	2019 Antalya	‍–‍81 kg
Silver medal – second place	2022 Almada	‍–‍90 kg
Bronze medal – third place	2019 Tel Aviv	‍–‍81 kg
World Juniors Championships
Gold medal – first place	2018 Nassau	‍–‍81 kg
Bronze medal – third place	2017 Zagreb	‍–‍81 kg
European Junior Championships
Bronze medal – third place	2017 Maribor	‍–‍81 kg
Bronze medal – third place	2018 Sofia	‍–‍81 kg
Mediterranean Games
Gold medal – first place	2026 Taranto	Mixed team
Silver medal – second place	2026 Taranto	‍–‍90 kg

Profile at external databases
- IJF: 18847
- JudoInside.com: 42195
- Updated on 1 September 2026

Christian Parlati (born 23 January 1998) is an Italian judoka. He won one of the bronze medals in the men's 81 kg event at the 2021 European Judo Championships held in Lisbon, Portugal. He also represented Italy at the 2020 Summer Olympics in Tokyo, Japan and the 2024 Summer Olympics in Paris, France.

== Achievements ==
Year	Tournament	Place	Weight class
2021	European Championships	3rd	−81 kg
2022	World Championships	2nd	−90 kg
2025	European Championships	1st	−90 kg
