= Theodoros Tselidis =

Greek judoka

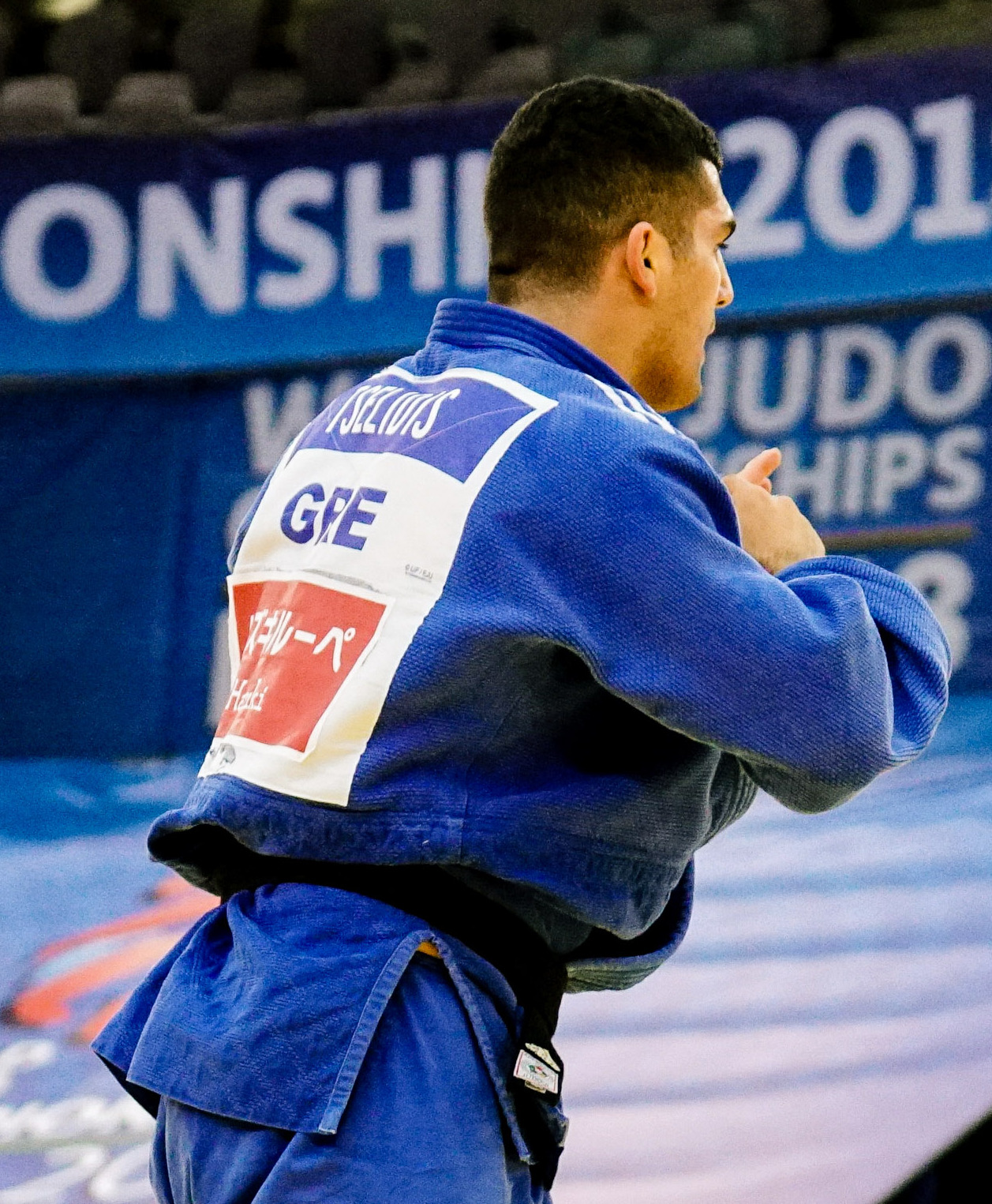
- Tselidis in 2018

Personal information
- Born: Fyodor Nikolayevich Tselidi; 5 August 1996 (age 30) Vladikavkaz, North Ossetia–Alania, Russia
- Occupation: Judoka

Sport
- Country: Greece
- Sport: Judo
- Weight class: ‍–‍90 kg
- Club: A.C. PAOK

Achievements and titles
- Olympic Games: (bronze) (2024)
- World Champ.: R16 (2022, 2024)
- European Champ.: (bronze) (2018, 2022)
Medal record
Men's judo
Representing Greece
Olympic Games
Bronze medal – third place	2024 Paris	‍–‍90 kg
European Championships
Bronze medal – third place	2018 Tel Aviv	‍–‍90 kg
Bronze medal – third place	2022 Sofia	‍–‍90 kg
IJF Grand Slam
Gold medal – first place	2024 Tashkent	‍–‍90 kg
Silver medal – second place	2026 Dushanbe	‍–‍90 kg
Bronze medal – third place	2023 Astana	‍–‍90 kg
Bronze medal – third place	2024 Tbilisi	‍–‍90 kg
Bronze medal – third place	2025 Astana	‍–‍90 kg
IJF Grand Prix
Silver medal – second place	2026 Zagreb	‍–‍90 kg
Bronze medal – third place	2018 Hohhot	‍–‍90 kg
Mediterranean Games
Silver medal – second place	2022 Oran	‍–‍90 kg
Bronze medal – third place	2018 Tarragona	‍–‍90 kg

Profile at external databases
- IJF: 42676
- JudoInside.com: 121982
- Updated on 15 November 2026

Theodoros Tselidis (Greek: Θεόδωρος Τσελίδης; born 5 August 1996; in Russia known as Fyodor Nikolayevich Tselidi; Russian: Фёдор Николаевич Целиди) is a Greek judoka. He won a bronze medal in judo while representing Greece at the 2024 Summer Olympics. He won a bronze medal for Greece at the 2018 European Championships. He also won a bronze medal at the 2018 Mediterranean Games.

== Life ==
Tselidis was born on 5 August 1996 in North Ossetia–Alania, Russia; his father was an ethnic Greek. In 2019, he graduated from North Ossetian State University with a degree in international political economy.

On 31 July 2024, Theodoros won a bronze medal at the Olympic Games in Paris in the 90 kg weight category.
