= Gantulgyn Altanbagana =

Mongolian judoka (born 1995)

Personal information
- Born: Гантулгын Алтанбагана; 21 June 1995 (age 31) Buren, Tuv, Mongolia
- Occupation: Judoka
- Height: 186 cm (6 ft 1 in)

Sport
- Country: Mongolia
- Sport: Judo
- Weight class: ‍–‍90 kg

Achievements and titles
- Olympic Games: R32 (2020)
- World Champ.: 5th (2021)
- Asian Champ.: (silver) (2018, 2024)
Medal record
Men's judo
Representing Mongolia
Asian Games
Silver medal – second place	2018 Jakarta	‍–‍90 kg
Bronze medal – third place	2023 Hangzhou	Mixed team
Asian Championships
Silver medal – second place	2024 Hong Kong	‍–‍90 kg
Bronze medal – third place	2022 Nur‑Sultan	‍–‍90 kg
IJF Grand Slam
Silver medal – second place	2020 Budapest	‍–‍90 kg
Bronze medal – third place	2018 Düsseldorf	‍–‍90 kg
Bronze medal – third place	2018 Ekaterinburg	‍–‍90 kg
Bronze medal – third place	2021 Tbilisi	‍–‍90 kg
Bronze medal – third place	2023 Tel Aviv	‍–‍90 kg
IJF Grand Prix
Gold medal – first place	2017 Antalya	‍–‍90 kg
Silver medal – second place	2016 Ulaanbaatar	‍–‍90 kg
Silver medal – second place	2016 Qingdao	‍–‍90 kg
Silver medal – second place	2018 Hohhot	‍–‍90 kg
Bronze medal – third place	2014 Qingdao	‍–‍90 kg
Bronze medal – third place	2017 Hohhot	‍–‍90 kg
Bronze medal – third place	2019 Tbilisi	‍–‍90 kg
Asian Cadet Championships
Bronze medal – third place	2010 Bangkok	‍–‍55 kg

Profile at external databases
- IJF: 8396
- JudoInside.com: 76192
- Updated on 26 April 2024

Gantulgyn Altanbagana (Mongolian: Гантулгын Алтанбагана born 21 June 1995) is a Mongolian judoka. In 2018, he won the silver medal in the men's 90 kg event at the 2018 Asian Games held in Jakarta, Indonesia.
