= Max Stewart (judoka) =

Jamaican judoka (born 1993)

Personal information
- Nationality: British
- Born: 16 July 1993 (age 32)
- Occupation: Judoka

Sport
- Country: Great Britain (until 2022); Jamaica (since 2023)
- Sport: Judo
- Weight class: ‍–‍81 kg, ‍–‍90 kg

Achievements and titles
- World Champ.: R16 (2019)
- Pan American Champ.: (2024)
Medal record
Men's judo
Representing Jamaica
Pan American Championships
Bronze medal – third place	2024 Rio de Janeiro	‍–‍81 kg
Representing Great Britain
IJF Grand Prix
Gold medal – first place	2016 Qingdao	‍–‍90 kg
Bronze medal – third place	2016 Zagreb	‍–‍90 kg
European Junior Championships
Silver medal – second place	2011 Lommel	‍–‍73 kg

Profile at external databases
- IJF: 9562, 73879
- JudoInside.com: 50309
- Updated on 29 April 2024

Max Stewart (born 16 July 1993) is a British-Jamaican judoka.

== Judo career ==
Stewart became champion of Great Britain, winning the middleweight division at the British Judo Championships in 2016. The same year he won the gold medal at the 2016 Judo Grand Prix Qingdao in the -90 kg category.

As of March 2023, Stewart competes internationally for Jamaica.
