= Nicholas Mungai =

Italian judoka (born 1993)

Personal information
- Born: 4 July 1993 (age 32) Pistoia, Italy
- Occupation: Judoka

Sport
- Country: Italy
- Sport: Judo
- Weight class: ‍–‍90 kg

Achievements and titles
- Olympic Games: R32 (2020)
- World Champ.: R16 (2018, 2021)
- European Champ.: R16 (2017, 2018, 2019, 2020, 2021)
Medal record
Men's judo
Representing Italy
World Championships
| Bronze medal – third place | 2024 Abu Dhabi | Mixed team |
European Games
| Bronze medal – third place | 2023 Kraków | Mixed team |
IJF Grand Slam
| Silver medal – second place | 2021 Tbilisi | ‍–‍90 kg |
| Bronze medal – third place | 2018 Ekaterinburg | ‍–‍90 kg |
IJF Grand Prix
| Silver medal – second place | 2019 Tel Aviv | ‍–‍90 kg |
| Bronze medal – third place | 2017 Zagreb | ‍–‍90 kg |
European U23 Championships
| Bronze medal – third place | 2015 Bratislava | ‍–‍90 kg |

Profile at external databases
- IJF: 18520
- JudoInside.com: 67414
- Updated on 25 May 2024

Nicolas Mungai (born 4 July 1993) is an Italian judoka.

Mungai is the silver medalist of the 2021 Judo Grand Slam Tbilisi and competed for Italy at the 2020 Summer Olympics.
