= Mihael Žgank =

Slovenian judoka

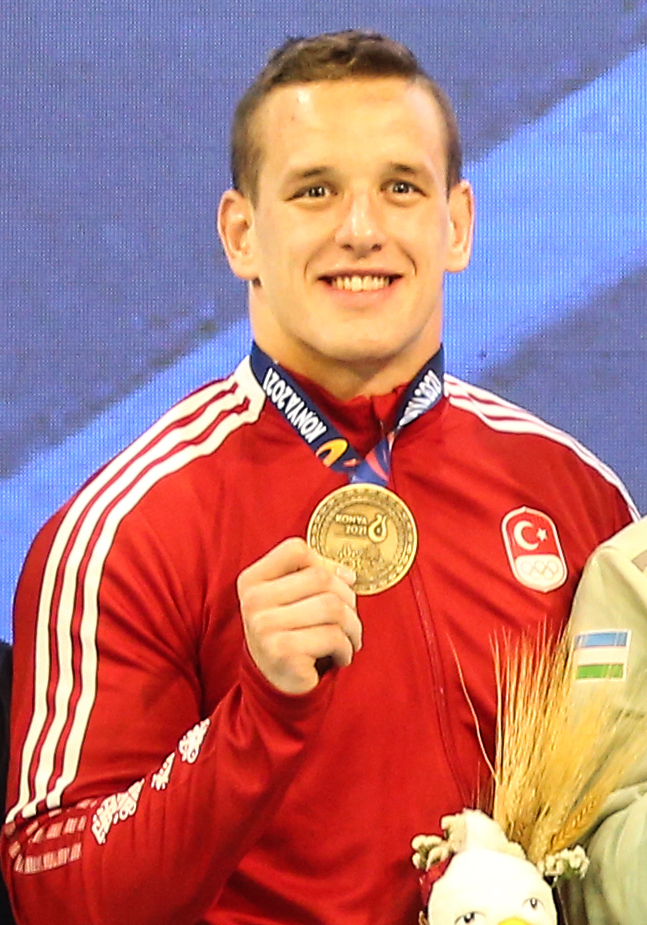

Personal information
- Native name: Mikail Özerler
- Nationality: Slovenian; Turkish
- Born: 1 February 1994 (age 32) Celje, Slovenia
- Occupation: Judoka
- Height: 1.81 m (5 ft 11 in)

Sport
- Country: Slovenia (2009–2017); Turkey (2018– )
- Sport: Judo
- Weight class: ‍–‍90 kg

Achievements and titles
- Olympic Games: 5th (2020)
- World Champ.: (silver) (2017)
- European Champ.: (gold) (2019)
Medal record
Men's judo
Representing Turkey
European Games
Gold medal – first place	2019 Minsk	‍–‍90 kg
European Championships
Bronze medal – third place	2023 Montpellier	‍–‍90 kg
World Masters
Bronze medal – third place	2019 Qingdao	‍–‍90 kg
IJF Grand Slam
Gold medal – first place	2024 Paris	‍–‍90 kg
Bronze medal – third place	2019 Brasilia	‍–‍90 kg
Bronze medal – third place	2022 Paris	‍–‍90 kg
Bronze medal – third place	2022 Tel Aviv	‍–‍90 kg
Bronze medal – third place	2023 Baku	‍–‍90 kg
Bronze medal – third place	2024 Antalya	‍–‍90 kg
IJF Grand Prix
Gold medal – first place	2019 Antalya	‍–‍90 kg
Gold medal – first place	2024 Odivelas	‍–‍90 kg
Silver medal – second place	2020 Tel Aviv	‍–‍90 kg
Silver medal – second place	2023 Zagreb	‍–‍90 kg
Bronze medal – third place	2019 Perth	‍–‍90 kg
Mediterranean Games
Gold medal – first place	2022 Oran	‍–‍90 kg
Islamic Solidarity Games
Gold medal – first place	2021 Konya	‍–‍90 kg
Silver medal – second place	2021 Konya	Men's team
Representing Slovenia
World Championships
Silver medal – second place	2017 Budapest	‍–‍90 kg
World Masters
Bronze medal – third place	2016 Guadalajara	‍–‍90 kg
IJF Grand Slam
Bronze medal – third place	2017 Paris	‍–‍90 kg
IJF Grand Prix
Silver medal – second place	2016 Budapest	‍–‍90 kg
Bronze medal – third place	2015 Tashkent	‍–‍90 kg
Bronze medal – third place	2016 Almaty	‍–‍90 kg
Bronze medal – third place	2017 Düsseldorf	‍–‍90 kg
European U23 Championships
Bronze medal – third place	2014 Wrocław	‍–‍90 kg
European Junior Championships
Bronze medal – third place	2011 Lommel	‍–‍90 kg
Bronze medal – third place	2012 Poreč	‍–‍90 kg

Profile at external databases
- IJF: 9361, 48433
- JudoInside.com: 65690
- Updated on 31 March 2024

Mihael Žgank (Turkish: Mikail Özerler; born 1 February 1994) is a Slovenian-born Turkish judoka.

== Career ==
Žgank competed for Slovenia at the 2016 Summer Olympics in Rio de Janeiro, in the men's 90 kg, where he lost to Aleksandar Kukolj of Serbia in the round of 32.

At the 2017 World Judo Championships in Budapest, Žgank won the silver medal.

Later, Žgank switched nationality from Slovenia to Turkey due to financial reasons. He participated at the 2018 World Judo Championships in Baku under his new Turkish name Mikail Özerler. He competed for Turkey at the 2020 Summer Olympics.

He won one of the bronze medals in his event at the 2022 Judo Grand Slam Paris held in Paris, France. He also won one of the bronze medals in his event at the 2022 Judo Grand Slam Tel Aviv held in Tel Aviv, Israel. Žgank competed for Turkey at the 2024 Summer Olympics.
