= Noël van 't End =

Dutch judoka (born 1991)

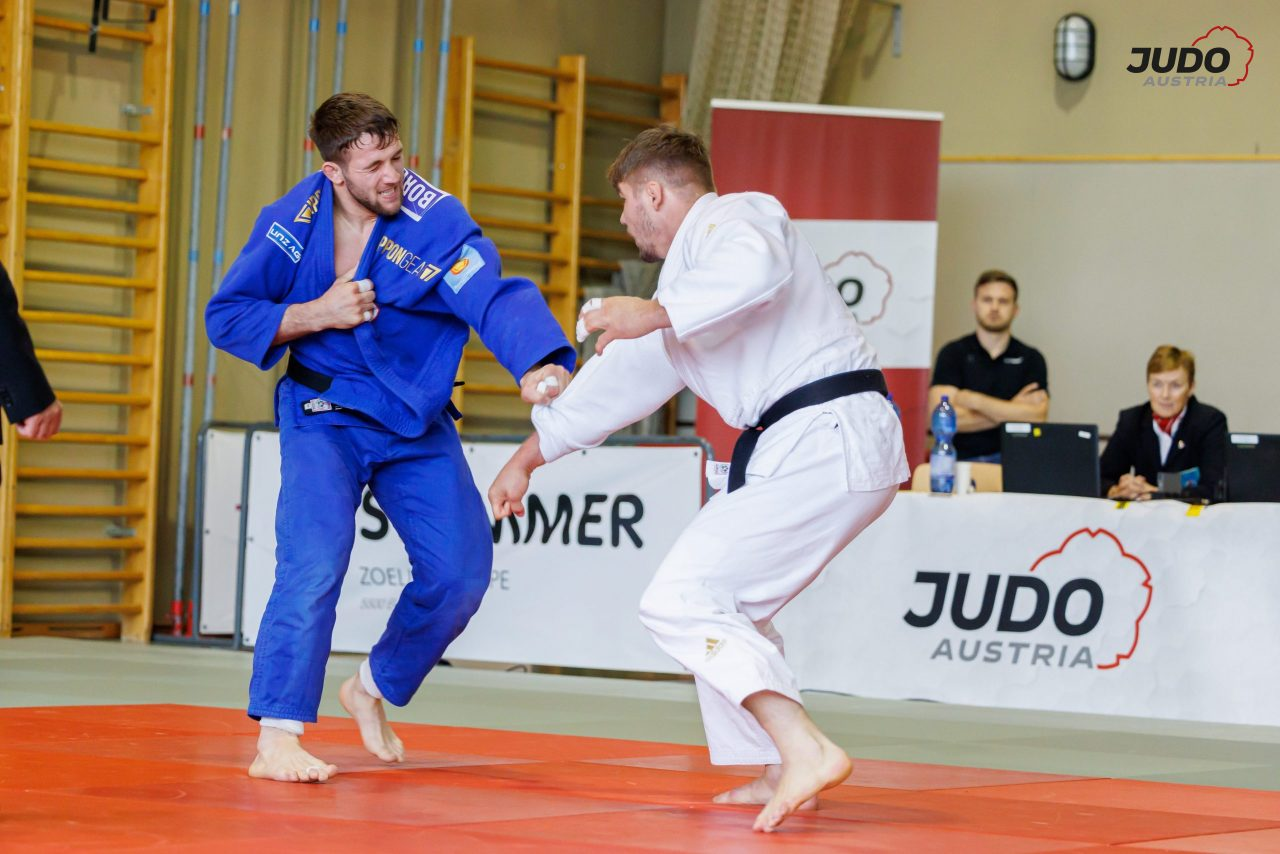
- Noël van't End (white) participates in the Austrian 1. Bundesliga 2022

Personal information
- Nationality: Dutch
- Born: 15 June 1991 (age 35) Houten, Netherlands
- Occupation: Judoka
- Height: 1.85 m (6 ft 1 in)

Sport
- Country: Netherlands
- Sport: Judo
- Weight class: ‍–‍90 kg
- Rank: 1st dan black belt
- Club: FLAM91
- Coached by: Theo Meijer

Achievements and titles
- Olympic Games: 7th (2020)
- World Champ.: (2019)
- European Champ.: 5th (2018, 2019, 2023, 2024)
Medal record
Men's judo
Representing the Netherlands
World Championships
Gold medal – first place	2019 Tokyo	‍–‍90 kg
Bronze medal – third place	2023 Doha	Mixed team
World Masters
Gold medal – first place	2021 Doha	‍–‍90 kg
Bronze medal – third place	2015 Rabat	‍–‍90 kg
IJF Grand Slam
Gold medal – first place	2019 Ekaterinburg	‍–‍90 kg
Gold medal – first place	2023 Paris	‍–‍90 kg
Gold medal – first place	2023 Antalya	‍–‍90 kg
Silver medal – second place	2014 Baku	‍–‍90 kg
Silver medal – second place	2014 Abu Dhabi	‍–‍90 kg
Silver medal – second place	2015 Baku	‍–‍90 kg
Silver medal – second place	2015 Abu Dhabi	‍–‍90 kg
Silver medal – second place	2018 Osaka	‍–‍90 kg
Bronze medal – third place	2017 Ekaterinburg	‍–‍90 kg
Bronze medal – third place	2022 Ulaanbaatar	‍–‍90 kg
IJF Grand Prix
Gold medal – first place	2014 Qingdao	‍–‍90 kg
Gold medal – first place	2015 Samsun	‍–‍90 kg
Gold medal – first place	2016 Tbilisi	‍–‍90 kg
Silver medal – second place	2013 Abu Dhabi	‍–‍90 kg
Silver medal – second place	2014 Düsseldorf	‍–‍90 kg
Bronze medal – third place	2014 Budapest	‍–‍90 kg
Bronze medal – third place	2014 Zagreb	‍–‍90 kg
Bronze medal – third place	2018 Tunis	‍–‍90 kg
Bronze medal – third place	2019 Zagreb	‍–‍90 kg
European U23 Championships
Bronze medal – third place	2012 Prague	‍–‍90 kg

Profile at external databases
- IJF: 9301
- JudoInside.com: 55592
- Updated on 27 April 2024

Noël van 't End (born 15 June 1991) is a Dutch judoka.

He competed at the 2016 Summer Olympics in Rio de Janeiro, in the men's 90 kg.

In 2021, he won the gold medal in his event at the 2021 Judo World Masters held in Doha, Qatar.

He holds a black belt.
