= Mammadali Mehdiyev =

Azerbaijani Olympic judoka

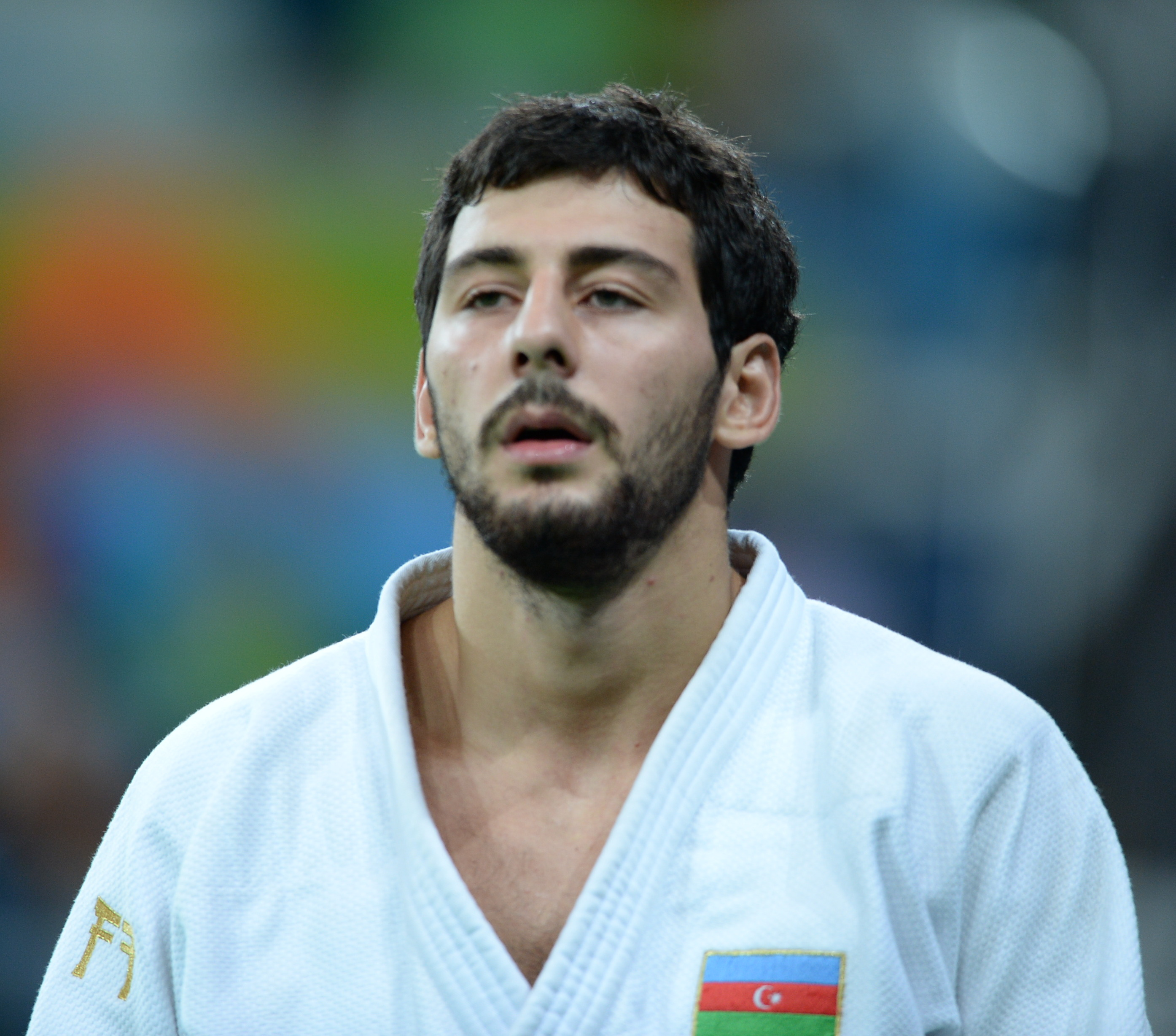
- Mehdiyev at the 2016 Olympics

Personal information
- Nationality: Azerbaijani
- Born: 9 April 1993 (age 33) Baku, Azerbaijan
- Occupation: Judoka
- Height: 1.88 m (6 ft 2 in)

Sport
- Country: Azerbaijan
- Sport: Judo
- Weight class: –90 kg
- Club: Attila-Neftchi
- Coached by: Peter Seisenbacher

Achievements and titles
- Olympic Games: 7th (2016)
- World Champ.: 7th (2017, 2019)
- European Champ.: (bronze) (2019, 2020, 2022)
Medal record
Men's judo
Representing Azerbaijan
European Games
Bronze medal – third place	2019 Minsk	‍–‍90 kg
European Championships
Bronze medal – third place	2016 Kazan	Men's team
Bronze medal – third place	2020 Prague	‍–‍90 kg
Bronze medal – third place	2022 Sofia	‍–‍90 kg
IJF Grand Slam
Gold medal – first place	2019 Düsseldorf	‍–‍90 kg
Gold medal – first place	2022 Tel Aviv	‍–‍90 kg
Silver medal – second place	2017 Baku	‍–‍90 kg
Silver medal – second place	2019 Baku	‍–‍90 kg
Silver medal – second place	2021 Baku	‍–‍90 kg
Silver medal – second place	2022 Paris	‍–‍90 kg
Bronze medal – third place	2014 Baku	‍–‍81 kg
Bronze medal – third place	2017 Abu Dhabi	‍–‍90 kg
Bronze medal – third place	2018 Abu Dhabi	‍–‍90 kg
Bronze medal – third place	2020 Budapest	‍–‍90 kg
Bronze medal – third place	2021 Tashkent	‍–‍90 kg
Bronze medal – third place	2023 Tel Aviv	‍–‍90 kg
IJF Grand Prix
Gold medal – first place	2018 Tashkent	‍–‍90 kg
Gold medal – first place	2021 Zagreb	‍–‍90 kg
Silver medal – second place	2014 Jeju	‍–‍90 kg
Silver medal – second place	2016 Samsun	‍–‍90 kg
Bronze medal – third place	2012 Baku	‍–‍81 kg
Bronze medal – third place	2016 Almaty	‍–‍90 kg
Bronze medal – third place	2018 Antalya	‍–‍90 kg
Bronze medal – third place	2018 Zagreb	‍–‍90 kg
Bronze medal – third place	2019 Tel Aviv	‍–‍90 kg
World Juniors Championships
Bronze medal – third place	2013 Ljubljana	‍–‍81 kg
European Junior Championships
Bronze medal – third place	2013 Sarajevo	‍–‍81 kg
Summer Universiade
Bronze medal – third place	2013 Kazan	‍–‍81 kg
Islamic Solidarity Games
Gold medal – first place	2017 Baku	‍–‍90 kg
Gold medal – first place	2017 Baku	Men's team

Profile at external databases
- IJF: 10699
- JudoInside.com: 84351
- Updated on 21 May 2023

Mammadali Mehdiyev (born 9 April 1993) is an Azerbaijani judoka who competed at the 2015 World Championships and 2016 Summer Olympics. He also represented his country at the Rio 2016 and Tokyo 2020 Olympic Games.

He won the silver medal in his event at the 2022 Judo Grand Slam Paris held in Paris, France. He won the gold medal in his event at the 2022 Judo Grand Slam Tel Aviv held in Tel Aviv, Israel.

In September 2026, Mamedali Mekhtiyev won the gold medal at the Veterans World Championship in the capital of Bosnia and Herzegovina, Sarajevo.
