= Peter Žilka =

Slovak judoka (born 1994)

Personal information
- Born: 21 February 1994 (age 32)
- Occupation: Judoka
- Height: 190 cm (6 ft 3 in)

Sport
- Country: Slovakia
- Sport: Judo
- Weight class: ‍–‍90 kg
- Club: MSK
- Coached by: Jozef Krnáč

Achievements and titles
- World Champ.: R16 (2018)
- European Champ.: R16 (2020, 2021, 2022, 2024)
Medal record
Men's judo
Representing Slovakia
IJF Grand Prix
Bronze medal – third place	2018 The Hague	‍–‍90 kg
Bronze medal – third place	2019 Tashkent	‍–‍90 kg

Profile at external databases
- IJF: 14531
- JudoInside.com: 80999
- Updated on 27 April 2024

Peter Žilka (born 21 February 1994) is a Slovak judoka.

Žilka is a bronze medalist from the 2018 Judo Grand Prix The Hague in the ‍–‍90 kg category.
