= Jesper Smink =

Dutch judoka (born 1997)

Personal information
- Nationality: Dutch
- Born: 15 December 1997 (age 28) Hoogland, Netherlands
- Occupation: Judoka
- Website: jespersmink.nl

Sport
- Country: Netherlands
- Sport: Judo
- Weight class: ‍–‍90 kg

Achievements and titles
- World Champ.: R16 (2019)
- European Champ.: 7th (2021, 2022)
Medal record
Men's judo
Representing the Netherlands
European Games
Bronze medal – third place	2023 Kraków	Mixed team
European Championships
Silver medal – second place	2022 Mulhouse	Mixed team
IJF Grand Slam
Silver medal – second place	2024 Abu Dhabi	‍–‍90 kg
Bronze medal – third place	2019 Düsseldorf	‍–‍90 kg
Bronze medal – third place	2022 Abu Dhabi	‍–‍90 kg
IJF Grand Prix
Gold medal – first place	2022 Almada	‍–‍90 kg
Bronze medal – third place	2017 The Hague	‍–‍90 kg
Bronze medal – third place	2018 Hohhot	‍–‍90 kg
Bronze medal – third place	2018 The Hague	‍–‍90 kg
Bronze medal – third place	2019 Tel Aviv	‍–‍90 kg
European U23 Championships
Bronze medal – third place	2016 Tel Aviv	‍–‍81 kg
European Junior Championships
Bronze medal – third place	2017 Maribor	‍–‍81 kg

Profile at external databases
- IJF: 20437
- JudoInside.com: 67256
- Updated on 14 October 2024

Jesper Smink (born 15 December 1997) is a Dutch judoka. Up to 23 April 2021, he has won 5 medals in the IJF World Tour and he has participated in 2 Senior World Championships and 4 Senior Continental Championships.

On 12 November 2022 he won a silver medal at the 2022 European Mixed Team Judo Championships as part of team Netherlands.
