= David Klammert =

Czech judoka (born 1994)

Personal information
- Born: 9 April 1994 (age 32) Kroměříž, Czech Republic
- Occupation: Judoka

Sport
- Country: Czech Republic
- Sport: Judo
- Weight class: ‍–‍90 kg

Achievements and titles
- Olympic Games: R32 (2020, 2024)
- World Champ.: R16 (2017, 2022, 2025)
- European Champ.: R16 (2025)
Medal record
Men's judo
Representing Czech Republic
IJF Grand Slam
Silver medal – second place	2024 Dushanbe	‍–‍90 kg
Bronze medal – third place	2021 Antalya	‍–‍90 kg
IJF Grand Prix
Gold medal – first place	2022 Perth	‍–‍90 kg
Bronze medal – third place	2018 Tunis	‍–‍90 kg
Bronze medal – third place	2023 Dushanbe	‍–‍90 kg
European U23 Championships
Gold medal – first place	2015 Bratislava	‍–‍90 kg

Profile at external databases
- IJF: 14448
- JudoInside.com: 62428
- Updated on 17 June 2025

David Klammert (born 9 April 1994) is a Czech judoka.

He is the bronze medallist of the 2021 Judo Grand Slam Antalya. He competed for the Czech Republic at the 2020 Summer Olympics where he was eliminated in the round of 32 by Li Kochman of Israel.
