= 2026 World Judo Championships – Men's 90 kg =

Judo competition

Judo Men's 90 kg at the 2026 World Judo Championships
- Venue: National Gymnastics Arena
- Location: Baku, Azerbaijan
- Date: 8 October 2026
- Competitors: 49 from 35 nations
- Total prize money: €57,000

Medalists
| gold medal | Sanshiro Murao (2nd title) | Japan |
| silver medal | Goki Tajima | Japan |
| bronze medal | Murad Fatiyev | Azerbaijan |
| bronze medal | Boris Rutović | Serbia |

Competition at external databases
- Links: IJF

The men's 90 kg event at the 2026 World Judo Championships was held at the National Gymnastics Arena in Baku, Azerbaijan on 8 October 2026.

== Results ==
=== Finals ===
Semi-finals
(Japan) Sanshiro Murao | 101
(France) Maxime-Gaël Ngayap Hambou | 000 (yellow card)
(Japan) Goki Tajima | 101
(Azerbaijan) Murad Fatiyev | 000

Final
(Japan) Sanshiro Murao | 110
(Japan) Goki Tajima | 000

=== Repechage ===
Repechage
(Serbia) Nemanja Majdov | 100 (yellow card)
(Uzbekistan) Nurbek Murtozoev | 000 (yellow card)
(Serbia) Boris Rutović | 102 (yellow card)
(France) Aleksa Mitrovic | 010 (yellow card)

Bronze medal
(Serbia) Nemanja Majdov | 000
(Azerbaijan) Murad Fatiyev | 001
(Serbia) Boris Rutović | 100 (yellow card)
(France) Maxime-Gaël Ngayap Hambou | 000

=== Pool A ===
First round
(Romania) Alex Creț | 000
(Kyrgyzstan) Erlan Sherov | 100
(South Korea) Song Min-ki | 000
(Georgia (country)) Lasha Bekauri | 100 (yellow card)
(Mauritius) Rémi Feuillet | 000
(United Kingdom) Lachlan Moorhead | 001 (yellow card)
(Hungary) Péter Sáfrány | 000
(Bulgaria) Ivaylo Ivanov | 020

Round of 32
(Japan) Sanshiro Murao | 101
(Kyrgyzstan) Erlan Sherov | 000
(Georgia (country)) Lasha Bekauri | 011 (yellow card)
(Senegal) Ryan Dacosta | 000 (yellow card)
(Serbia) Nemanja Majdov | 100
(United Kingdom) Lachlan Moorhead | 000
(Bulgaria) Ivaylo Ivanov | 001
(Egypt) Abdalla Abdelsamea | 000 (yellow card)

Round of 16
(Japan) Sanshiro Murao | 100
(Georgia (country)) Lasha Bekauri | 000
(Serbia) Nemanja Majdov | 100 (yellow card)
(Bulgaria) Ivaylo Ivanov | 000

Quarter-finals
(Japan) Sanshiro Murao | 010
(Serbia) Nemanja Majdov | 000

=== Pool B ===
First round
(Czech Republic) David Klammert | 000
(France) Maxime-Gaël Ngayap Hambou | 100
(Azerbaijan) Eljan Hajiyev | 110 (yellow card)
(United States) Alexander Knauf | 000
(Italy) Kenny Komi Bedel | 100 (yellow card)
(Peru) Yuta Galarreta | 000
(Israel) Roy Sivan | 010 (yellow card)
(Germany) Eduard Trippel | 012 (yellow card)

Round of 32
(Brazil) Rafael Macedo | 000
(France) Maxime-Gaël Ngayap Hambou | 100 (yellow card)
(Azerbaijan) Eljan Hajiyev | 100
(Canada) Keagan Young | 001
(Brazil) Guilherme Schimidt | 000 (yellow card)
(Italy) Kenny Komi Bedel | 100 (yellow card)
(Germany) Eduard Trippel | 000
(Uzbekistan) Nurbek Murtozoev | 100 (yellow card)

Round of 16
(France) Maxime-Gaël Ngayap Hambou | 100 (yellow card)
(Azerbaijan) Eljan Hajiyev | 000 (yellow card)
(Italy) Kenny Komi Bedel | 000
(Uzbekistan) Nurbek Murtozoev | 100

Quarter-finals
(France) Maxime-Gaël Ngayap Hambou | 100
(Uzbekistan) Nurbek Murtozoev | 000

=== Pool C ===
First round
(Russia) Egor Andoni | 000 (yellow card)
(Serbia) Boris Rutović | 002
(Kyrgyzstan) Daniiar Melisov | 100
(Spain) Aharón Santamaría | 000 (yellow card)
(United States) John Jayne | 000 (yellow card)
(Moldova) Mihail Latișev | 020
(Norway) Kornelius Eilertsen | 000
(Azerbaijan) Suleyman Shukurov | 002 (yellow card)
(Chinese Taipei) Chen Peng-yu | 000
(Hungary) Gergely Nerpel | 020

Round of 32
(Georgia (country)) Luka Maisuradze | 000 (yellow card)
(Serbia) Boris Rutović | 001 (yellow card)
(Kyrgyzstan) Daniiar Melisov | 000
(Moldova) Mihail Latișev | 020
(Japan) Goki Tajima | 001
(Azerbaijan) Suleyman Shukurov | 000
(Hungary) Gergely Nerpel | 000
(Austria) Thomas Scharfetter | 001 (yellow card)

Round of 16
(Serbia) Boris Rutović | 020 (yellow card)
(Moldova) Mihail Latișev | 001
(Japan) Goki Tajima | 001
(Austria) Thomas Scharfetter | 000 (yellow card)

Quarter-finals
(Serbia) Boris Rutović | 000
(Japan) Goki Tajima | 001 (yellow card)

=== Pool D ===
First round
(Belarus) Yahor Varapayeu | 000
(Greece) Theodoros Tselidis | 100 (yellow card)
(Slovakia) Alex Barto | 000
(Estonia) Klen-Kristofer Kaljulaid | 100
(France) Aleksa Mitrovic | 100
(Uzbekistan) Umar Bozorov | 000
(Czech Republic) Adam Kopecký | 100
(Senegal) Namory Keita | 000

Round of 32
(Azerbaijan) Murad Fatiyev | 001 (yellow card)
(Greece) Theodoros Tselidis | 000 (yellow card)
(Estonia) Klen-Kristofer Kaljulaid | 010 (yellow card)
(China) Bu Hebilige | 001
(South Korea) Kim Jong-hoon | 000
(France) Aleksa Mitrovic | 001
(Czech Republic) Adam Kopecký | 100
(Bosnia and Herzegovina) Toni Miletić | 000 (yellow card)

Round of 16
(Azerbaijan) Murad Fatiyev | 010
(Estonia) Klen-Kristofer Kaljulaid | 001
(France) Aleksa Mitrovic | 100 (yellow card)
(Czech Republic) Adam Kopecký | 001

Quarter-finals
(Azerbaijan) Murad Fatiyev | 102
(France) Aleksa Mitrovic | 000

== Prize money ==
The sums listed bring the total prizes awarded to €57,000 for the individual event.

| Medal | Total | Judoka | Coach |
|---|---|---|---|
| Gold | €26,000 | €20,800 | €5,200 |
| Silver | €15,000 | €12,000 | €3,000 |
| Bronze | €8,000 | €6,400 | €1,600 |
