= 2024 World Judo Championships – Men's 90 kg =

Judo competition

Judo Men's 90 kg at the 2024 World Judo Championships
- Venue: Mubadala Arena
- Location: Abu Dhabi, United Arab Emirates
- Date: 22 May 2024
- Competitors: 50 from 41 nations
- Total prize money: €57,000

Medalists
gold medal	Goki Tajima (1st title)	Japan
silver medal	Nemanja Majdov	Serbia
bronze medal	Erlan Sherov	Kyrgyzstan
bronze medal	Tristani Mosakhlishvili	Spain

Competition at external databases
- Links: IJF • JudoInside

The Men's 90 kg event at the 2024 World Judo Championships was held at the Mubadala Arena in Abu Dhabi, United Arab Emirates on 22 May 2024.

== Results ==
=== Finals ===
Semi-finals
(Lebanon) Caramnob Sagaipov	00
(Serbia) Nemanja Majdov	10
(Japan) Goki Tajima	10 (yellow card)
(Kyrgyzstan) Erlan Sherov	00

Final
(Serbia) Nemanja Majdov	00
(Japan) Goki Tajima	01 (yellow card)

=== Repechage ===
Repechage
(Italy) Christian Parlati	11 (yellow card)
(Cuba) Iván Felipe Silva Morales	00 (yellow card)
(Spain) Tristani Mosakhlishvili	w/o
Bye

Bronze medal
(Italy) Christian Parlati	00
(Kyrgyzstan) Erlan Sherov	10 (yellow card)
(Spain) Tristani Mosakhlishvili	01 (yellow card)
(Lebanon) Caramnob Sagaipov	00 (yellow card)

=== Pool A ===
First round
(Lebanon) Caramnob Sagaipov	11 (yellow card)
Yahor Varapayeu	00 (yellow card)
(Brazil) Marcelo Gomes	11 (yellow card)
(Israel) Li Kochman	00
(Netherlands) Noël van 't End	11 (yellow card)
(Peru) Yuta Galarreta	00 (yellow card)
(United States) John Jayne	00 (yellow card)
(Azerbaijan) Vugar Talibov	11 (yellow card)
(Bosnia and Herzegovina) Toni Miletić	00
(Tajikistan) Komronshokh Ustopiriyon	10

Round of 32
(Hungary) Krisztián Tóth	00 (yellow card)
(Lebanon) Caramnob Sagaipov	01 (yellow card)
(Brazil) Marcelo Gomes	00
(Netherlands) Noël van 't End	10
(Italy) Christian Parlati	02 (yellow card)
(Azerbaijan) Vugar Talibov	00
(Tajikistan) Komronshokh Ustopiriyon	00 (yellow card)
(South Korea) Han Ju-yeop	01

Round of 16
(Lebanon) Caramnob Sagaipov	10
(Netherlands) Noël van 't End	01
(Italy) Christian Parlati	01 (yellow card)
(South Korea) Han Ju-yeop	00

Quarter-finals
(Lebanon) Caramnob Sagaipov	10
(Italy) Christian Parlati	01

=== Pool B ===
First round
(Dominican Republic) Robert Florentino	01
(Czech Republic) David Klammert	10 (yellow card)
(Senegal) Ryan Dacosta	00
(Turkmenistan) Mämmedaly Açyldyýew	10 (yellow card)
(Argentina) Mariano Coto	01
(Georgia (country)) Giorgi Jabniashvili	00 (yellow card)
(Bulgaria) Ivaylo Ivanov	01
(Romania) Alex Creţ	00

Round of 32
(Serbia) Nemanja Majdov	10
(Czech Republic) David Klammert	00
(Turkmenistan) Mämmedaly Açyldyýew	10
(Slovakia) Peter Žilka	00
(Cuba) Iván Felipe Silva Morales	10
(Argentina) Mariano Coto	00
(Bulgaria) Ivaylo Ivanov	00
(France) Alexis Mathieu	11

Round of 16
(Serbia) Nemanja Majdov	10
(Turkmenistan) Mämmedaly Açyldyýew	00
(Cuba) Iván Felipe Silva Morales	01 (yellow card)
(France) Alexis Mathieu	00

Quarter-finals
(Serbia) Nemanja Majdov	02
(Cuba) Iván Felipe Silva Morales	00 (yellow card)

=== Pool C ===
First round
(Canada) Louis Krieber-Gagnon	00 (yellow card)
(Hungary) Péter Sáfrány	10
(Mauritius) Rémi Feuillet	00
(France) Maxime-Gaël Ngayap Hambou	11
(Germany) Eduard Trippel	00 (yellow card)
(Azerbaijan) Eljan Hajiyev	01 (yellow card)
(Japan) Goki Tajima	01
(Egypt) Ali Hazem	00 (yellow card)

Round of 32
(Uzbekistan) Davlat Bobonov	01
(Hungary) Péter Sáfrány	10
(France) Maxime-Gaël Ngayap Hambou	00 (yellow card)
(Spain) Tristani Mosakhlishvili	11
(Brazil) Rafael Macedo	10
(Azerbaijan) Eljan Hajiyev	01 (yellow card)
(Japan) Goki Tajima	01 (yellow card)
(Sweden) Marcus Nyman	00 (yellow card)

Round of 16
(Hungary) Péter Sáfrány	00 (yellow card)
(Spain) Tristani Mosakhlishvili	11
(Brazil) Rafael Macedo	00 (yellow card)
(Japan) Goki Tajima	11

Quarter-finals
(Spain) Tristani Mosakhlishvili	00 (yellow card)
(Japan) Goki Tajima	10 (yellow card)

=== Pool D ===
First round
(Estonia) Klen-Kristofer Kaljulaid	00
(Greece) Theodoros Tselidis	10
(United Kingdom) Jamal Petgrave	00
(South Korea) Gwak Dong-han	10
(Tajikistan) Muhammadjon Abdujalilzoda	00
(Serbia) Darko Brašnjović	01
(Belgium) Sami Chouchi	10 (yellow card)
(Senegal) Abderahmane Diao	00 (yellow card)
(United Arab Emirates) Aram Grigorian	10 (yellow card)
(Romania) Vlad Vişan	00

Round of 32
(Turkey) Mihael Žgank	00 (yellow card)
(Greece) Theodoros Tselidis	02
(South Korea) Gwak Dong-han	02
(Mongolia) Gantulgyn Altanbagana	00 (yellow card)
(Kyrgyzstan) Erlan Sherov	10
(Serbia) Darko Brašnjović	00
(Belgium) Sami Chouchi	10 (yellow card)
(United Arab Emirates) Aram Grigorian	00

Round of 16
(Greece) Theodoros Tselidis	10
(South Korea) Gwak Dong-han	10
(Kyrgyzstan) Erlan Sherov	10
(Belgium) Sami Chouchi	00

Quarter-finals
Bye
(Kyrgyzstan) Erlan Sherov	w/o

== Prize money ==
The sums listed bring the total prizes awarded to €57,000 for the individual event.

Medal	Total	Judoka	Coach
Gold	€26,000	€20,800	€5,200
Silver	€15,000	€12,000	€3,000
Bronze	€8,000	€6,400	€1,600
