= 2026 European Judo Championships – Men's 90 kg =

Judo competition

Judo Men's 90 kg at the 2026 European Judo Championships
- Venue: Olympic Palace
- Location: Tbilisi, Georgia
- Date: 18 April 2026
- Competitors: 38 from 23 nations

Medalists
gold medal	Luka Maisuradze (2nd title)	Georgia
silver medal	Nemanja Majdov	Serbia
bronze medal	Alex Creț	Romania
bronze medal	Maxime-Gaël Ngayap Hambou	France

Competition at external databases
- Links: IJF • JudoInside

The men's 90 kg event at the 2026 European Judo Championships was held at the Olympic Palace in Tbilisi, Georgia on 18 April 2026.

== Results ==
=== Finals ===
Semi-finals
(Georgia (country)) Lasha Bekauri	000
(Serbia) Nemanja Majdov	100 (yellow card)
(Georgia (country)) Luka Maisuradze	010
(Romania) Alex Creț	001

Final
(Serbia) Nemanja Majdov	000 (yellow card)
(Georgia (country)) Luka Maisuradze	010 (yellow card)

=== Repechage ===
Repechage
(Belarus) Yahor Varapayeu	000
(Austria) Thomas Scharfetter	100 (yellow card)
(Bulgaria) Ivaylo Ivanov	000
(France) Maxime-Gaël Ngayap Hambou	011 (yellow card)

Bronze medal
(Austria) Thomas Scharfetter	000
(Romania) Alex Creț	020
(France) Maxime-Gaël Ngayap Hambou	020
(Georgia (country)) Lasha Bekauri	000

=== Pool A ===
First round
(Estonia) Klen-Kristofer Kaljulaid	000
(Moldova) Mihail Latișev	001
(Montenegro) Stevan Nikcevic	000
(Germany) Lasse Schriever	101

Round of 32
(Georgia (country)) Lasha Bekauri	100
(Italy) Kenny Komi Bedel	000 (yellow card)
(Moldova) Mihail Latișev	002 (yellow card)
(Czech Republic) David Klammert	000 (yellow card)
(Belarus) Yahor Varapayeu	100 (yellow card)
(Romania) Vlad Vişan	000 (yellow card)
(Germany) Lasse Schriever	001 (yellow card)
(Hungary) Péter Sáfrány	000

Round of 16
(Georgia (country)) Lasha Bekauri	110
(Moldova) Mihail Latișev	001
(Belarus) Yahor Varapayeu	020
(Germany) Lasse Schriever	000

Quarter-finals
(Georgia (country)) Lasha Bekauri	100
(Belarus) Yahor Varapayeu	000

=== Pool B ===
First round
(Spain) Aarón Santamaría Rodríguez	000 (yellow card)
(Bulgaria) Mariyan Palev	001

Round of 32
(Serbia) Nemanja Majdov	100
(Bulgaria) Mariyan Palev	000
(Russia) Egor Andoni	000 (yellow card)
(France) Alexis Mathieu	010
(Greece) Theodoros Tselidis	000
(Israel) Roy Sivan	100
(Austria) Thomas Scharfetter	001 (yellow card)
(Belgium) Noah Christiaens	000

Round of 16
(Serbia) Nemanja Majdov	100 (yellow card)
(France) Alexis Mathieu	000
(Israel) Roy Sivan	000 (yellow card)
(Austria) Thomas Scharfetter	001 (yellow card)

Quarter-finals
(Serbia) Nemanja Majdov	100
(Austria) Thomas Scharfetter	000

=== Pool C ===
First round
(Belgium) Jarne Duyck	000
(Israel) Reem Fridman Zilberstein	010
(Belarus) Andrei Shymbaliou	000
(Bulgaria) Ivaylo Ivanov	001 (yellow card)

Round of 32
(Georgia (country)) Luka Maisuradze	010
(Israel) Reem Fridman Zilberstein	000 (yellow card)
(Bosnia and Herzegovina) Toni Miletić	000
(Serbia) Islam Šogenov	001
(Czech Republic) Adam Kopecký	000
(Bulgaria) Ivaylo Ivanov	100 (yellow card)
(Austria) Issa Naschcho	002
(Hungary) Gergely Nerpel	001 (yellow card)

Round of 16
(Georgia (country)) Luka Maisuradze	011 (yellow card)
(Serbia) Islam Šogenov	000 (yellow card)
(Bulgaria) Ivaylo Ivanov	011
(Austria) Issa Naschcho	000 (yellow card)

Quarter-finals
(Georgia (country)) Luka Maisuradze	100
(Bulgaria) Ivaylo Ivanov	001 (yellow card)

=== Pool D ===
First round
(Slovakia) Alex Barto	000
(Greece) Athanasios Mylonelis	010 (yellow card)

Round of 32
(Azerbaijan) Murad Fatiyev	000 (yellow card)
(Romania) Alex Creț	020
(Greece) Athanasios Mylonelis	020
(Lithuania) Augustas Šlyteris	000
(France) Maxime-Gaël Ngayap Hambou	100 (yellow card)
(Montenegro) Novo Raičević	001 (yellow card)
(Moldova) Vadim Ghimbovschi	101
(Germany) Johann Lenz	010 (yellow card)

Round of 16
(Romania) Alex Creț	101
(Greece) Athanasios Mylonelis	011
(France) Maxime-Gaël Ngayap Hambou	010
(Moldova) Vadim Ghimbovschi	000

Quarter-finals
(Romania) Alex Creț	001
(France) Maxime-Gaël Ngayap Hambou	000 (yellow card)
