= 2023 European Judo Championships – Men's 90 kg =

Judo competition

Judo Men's 90 kg at the 2023 European Judo Championships
- Venue: Sud de France Arena
- Location: Montpellier, France
- Date: 5 November 2023
- Competitors: 32 from 25 nations

Medalists
gold medal	Nemanja Majdov (1st title)	Serbia
silver medal	Lasha Bekauri	Georgia
bronze medal	Krisztián Tóth	Hungary
bronze medal	Mihael Žgank	Turkey

Competition at external databases
- Links: IJF • JudoInside

The Men's 90 kg event at the 2023 European Judo Championships was held at the Sud de France Arena in Montpellier, France on 5 November 2023.

== Results ==
=== Finals ===
Semi-finals
(Turkey) Mihael Žgank	00 (yellow card)
(Serbia) Nemanja Majdov	10
(Georgia (country)) Lasha Bekauri	01
(Netherlands) Noël van 't End	00

Final
(Serbia) Nemanja Majdov	10
(Georgia (country)) Lasha Bekauri	00 (yellow card)

=== Repechage ===
Repechage
(Romania) Alex Creţ	00
(Hungary) Krisztián Tóth	01
(France) Alexis Mathieu	00 (yellow card)
Mansur Lorsanov	01 (yellow card)

Bronze medal
(Hungary) Krisztián Tóth	10 (yellow card)
(Netherlands) Noël van 't End	00
Mansur Lorsanov	00
(Turkey) Mihael Žgank	10

=== Pool A ===
First round
(Georgia (country)) Luka Maisuradze	00 (yellow card)
(Turkey) Mihael Žgank	01 (yellow card)
(France) Axel Clerget	10
(Czech Republic) David Klammert	00
(Bulgaria) Ivaylo Ivanov	01
(Estonia) Klen-Kristofer Kaljulaid	00 (yellow card)
(United Kingdom) Stuart McWatt	00
(Romania) Alex Creţ	01

Round of 16
(Turkey) Mihael Žgank	01
(France) Axel Clerget	00 (yellow card)
(Bulgaria) Ivaylo Ivanov	00
(Romania) Alex Creţ	01

Quarter-finals
(Turkey) Mihael Žgank	02
(Romania) Alex Creţ	00 (yellow card)

=== Pool B ===
First round
(Hungary) Krisztián Tóth	10
Yahor Varapayeu	00
(Austria) Adam Borchashvilli	00 (yellow card)
(Bosnia and Herzegovina) Toni Miletić	10 (yellow card)
(Serbia) Nemanja Majdov	10
(Belgium) Karel Foubert	00
(Montenegro) Novo Raičević	01 (yellow card)
(Germany) Johann Lenz	10

Round of 16
(Hungary) Krisztián Tóth	10
(Bosnia and Herzegovina) Toni Miletić	00
(Serbia) Nemanja Majdov	01
(Germany) Johann Lenz	00

Quarter-finals
(Hungary) Krisztián Tóth	00
(Serbia) Nemanja Majdov	01

=== Pool C ===
First round
(Georgia (country)) Lasha Bekauri	02 (yellow card)
(Azerbaijan) Murad Fatiyev	00
(Moldova) Dorin Gotonoaga	00 (yellow card)
(Sweden) Marcus Nyman	02 (yellow card)
(France) Alexis Mathieu	10 (yellow card)
(Norway) Kornelius Eilertsen	01
(Belgium) Sami Chouchi	10
(United Kingdom) Jamal Petgrave	00

Round of 16
(Georgia (country)) Lasha Bekauri	10 (yellow card)
(Sweden) Marcus Nyman	00
(France) Alexis Mathieu	02
(Belgium) Sami Chouchi	00

Quarter-finals
(Georgia (country)) Lasha Bekauri	10
(France) Alexis Mathieu	00

=== Pool D ===
First round
(Italy) Christian Parlati	10
(Serbia) Darko Brašnjović	00 (yellow card)
Mansur Lorsanov	10 (yellow card)
(Greece) Theodoros Tselidis	00
(Netherlands) Noël van 't End	02
(North Macedonia) Andrej Chakarovski	00
(Spain) Daniel Nieto	00
(Austria) Thomas Scharfetter	01

Round of 16
(Italy) Christian Parlati	00
Mansur Lorsanov	01
(Netherlands) Noël van 't End	01
(Austria) Thomas Scharfetter	00

Quarter-finals
Mansur Lorsanov	00
(Netherlands) Noël van 't End	01
