= 2025 World Judo Championships – Men's 90 kg =

Judo competition

Judo Men's 90 kg at the 2025 World Judo Championships
- Venue: László Papp Budapest Sports Arena
- Location: Budapest, Hungary
- Date: 17 June 2025
- Competitors: 47 from 34 nations
- Total prize money: €57,000

Medalists
gold medal	Sanshiro Murao (1st title)	Japan
silver medal	Goki Tajima	Japan
bronze medal	Eljan Hajiyev	Azerbaijan
bronze medal	Luka Maisuradze	Georgia

Competition at external databases
- Links: IJF • JudoInside

The 2025 World Judo Championships was held at the László Papp Budapest Sports Arena in Budapest, Hungary on 17 June 2025.

== Results ==
=== Finals ===
Semi-finals
(Japan) Sanshiro Murao	100
(Georgia (country)) Luka Maisuradze	000 (yellow card)
(Japan) Goki Tajima	101
(Azerbaijan) Eljan Hajiyev	010 (yellow card)

Final
(Japan) Sanshiro Murao	100 (yellow card)
(Japan) Goki Tajima	000

=== Repechage ===
Repechage
(France) Maxime-Gaël Ngayap Hambou	000
(Estonia) Klen-Kristofer Kaljulaid	001
(Italy) Kenny Komi Bedel	001 (yellow card)
(Czech Republic) Adam Kopecký	000

Bronze medal
(Estonia) Klen-Kristofer Kaljulaid	000 (yellow card)
(Azerbaijan) Eljan Hajiyev	001 (yellow card)
(Italy) Kenny Komi Bedel	000 (yellow card)
(Georgia (country)) Luka Maisuradze	101 (yellow card)

=== Pool A ===
First round
(Uzbekistan) Shakhzodxuja Sharipov	100
(Norway) Kornelius Eilertsen	000
(Belarus) Yahor Varapayeu	100
(Austria) Thomas Scharfetter	000 (yellow card)
(United States) Oleksandr Nyzhnyk	000
(Brazil) Marcelo Gomes	001
(Turkmenistan) Mämmedaly Açyldyýew	000
(Morocco) Achraf Moutii	100

Round of 32
(Japan) Sanshiro Murao	110
(Uzbekistan) Shakhzodxuja Sharipov	000
(Belarus) Yahor Varapayeu	100 (yellow card)
(Hungary) Gergely Nerpel	000
(France) Maxime-Gaël Ngayap Hambou	001
(Brazil) Marcelo Gomes	000
(Morocco) Achraf Moutii	000
(Netherlands) Markus van Dijk	100

Round of 16
(Japan) Sanshiro Murao	100
(Belarus) Yahor Varapayeu	000
(France) Maxime-Gaël Ngayap Hambou	001
(Netherlands) Markus van Dijk	000

Quarter-finals
(Japan) Sanshiro Murao	100
(France) Maxime-Gaël Ngayap Hambou	000

=== Pool B ===
First round
(Germany) Eduard Trippel	000
(Moldova) Vadim Ghimbovschi	001
(Slovakia) Peter Žilka	000
(Bosnia and Herzegovina) Toni Miletić	100
(Finland) Artur Kanevets	000 (yellow card)
(Czech Republic) David Klammert	100 (yellow card)
(Georgia (country)) Luka Maisuradze	012 (yellow card)
(Azerbaijan) Vugar Talibov	010 (yellow card)

Round of 32
(Greece) Theodoros Tselidis	002
(Moldova) Vadim Ghimbovschi	100
(Bosnia and Herzegovina) Toni Miletić	000
(Estonia) Klen-Kristofer Kaljulaid	010 (yellow card)
(Serbia) Nemanja Majdov	000 (yellow card)
(Czech Republic) David Klammert	001
(Georgia (country)) Luka Maisuradze	001
(Italy) Christian Parlati	000

Round of 16
(Moldova) Vadim Ghimbovschi	000
(Estonia) Klen-Kristofer Kaljulaid	100
(Czech Republic) David Klammert	000 (yellow card)
(Georgia (country)) Luka Maisuradze	010 (yellow card)

Quarter-finals
(Estonia) Klen-Kristofer Kaljulaid	000 (yellow card)
(Georgia (country)) Luka Maisuradze	010 (yellow card)

=== Pool C ===
First round
(Serbia) Miljan Radulj	000
(Belarus) Aliaksandr Sidoryk	102 (yellow card)
(International Judo Federation) Mikhail Igolnikov	000
(Slovakia) Alex Barto	021 (yellow card)
(Senegal) Abderahmane Diao	000
(United Arab Emirates) Ibragimgadzhi Suleimanov	100
(Kazakhstan) Meiirlan Maxim	001
(France) Alexis Mathieu	000

Round of 32
(Georgia (country)) Lasha Bekauri	020
(Belarus) Aliaksandr Sidoryk	000
(Slovakia) Alex Barto	000 (yellow card)
(Italy) Kenny Komi Bedel	001
(Japan) Goki Tajima	011
(United Arab Emirates) Ibragimgadzhi Suleimanov	000
(Kazakhstan) Meiirlan Maxim	001
(Dominican Republic) Robert Florentino	000

Round of 16
(Georgia (country)) Lasha Bekauri	000 (yellow card)
(Italy) Kenny Komi Bedel	001
(Japan) Goki Tajima	100
(Kazakhstan) Meiirlan Maxim	000

Quarter-finals
(Italy) Kenny Komi Bedel	000
(Japan) Goki Tajima	001 (yellow card)

=== Pool D ===
First round
(Bulgaria) Ivaylo Ivanov	000 (yellow card)
(Czech Republic) Adam Kopecký	001
(Kyrgyzstan) Erlan Sherov	101
(Hungary) Péter Sáfrány	001
(Uzbekistan) Nurbek Murtozoev	100
(Mauritius) Rémi Feuillet	000

Round of 32
(Brazil) Rafael Macedo	000
(Czech Republic) Adam Kopecký	010
(Kyrgyzstan) Erlan Sherov	000
(South Korea) Kim Jong-hoon	001 (yellow card)
(Azerbaijan) Eljan Hajiyev	010
(Uzbekistan) Nurbek Murtozoev	001 (yellow card)
(Chinese Taipei) Chen Peng-yu	100
(United States) John Jayne	000

Round of 16
(Czech Republic) Adam Kopecký	001
(South Korea) Kim Jong-hoon	000 (yellow card)
(Azerbaijan) Eljan Hajiyev	100
(Chinese Taipei) Chen Peng-yu	000 (yellow card)

Quarter-finals
(Czech Republic) Adam Kopecký	000
(Azerbaijan) Eljan Hajiyev	100

== Prize money ==
The sums listed bring the total prizes awarded to €57,000 for the individual event.

Medal	Total	Judoka	Coach
Gold	€26,000	€20,800	€5,200
Silver	€15,000	€12,000	€3,000
Bronze	€8,000	€6,400	€1,600
