= 2024 European Judo Championships – Men's 90 kg =

Judo competition

Judo Men's 90 kg at the 2024 European Judo Championships
- Venue: Arena Zagreb
- Location: Zagreb, Croatia
- Date: 27 April
- Competitors: 37 from 24 nations

Medalists
gold medal	Eljan Hajiyev (1st title)	Azerbaijan
silver medal	Krisztián Tóth	Hungary
bronze medal	Lasha Bekauri	Georgia
bronze medal	Alex Creţ	Romania

Competition at external databases
- Links: IJF • JudoInside

The Men's 90 kg event at the 2024 European Judo Championships was held at the Arena Zagreb in Zagreb, Croatia on 27 April 2024.

== Results ==
=== Finals ===
Semi-finals
(Azerbaijan) Eljan Hajiyev	02
(Romania) Alex Creţ	00
(Hungary) Krisztián Tóth	10
(Azerbaijan) Murad Fatiyev	00

Final
(Azerbaijan) Eljan Hajiyev	02
(Hungary) Krisztián Tóth	00 (yellow card)

=== Repechage ===
Repechage
(Georgia (country)) Lasha Bekauri	01
(France) Loris Tassier	00
(Netherlands) Noël van 't End	02 (yellow card)
(France) Alexis Mathieu	00 (yellow card)

Bronze medal
(Georgia (country)) Lasha Bekauri	10
(Azerbaijan) Murad Fatiyev	01 (yellow card)
(Netherlands) Noël van 't End	00
(Romania) Alex Creţ	10

=== Pool A ===
First round
(Norway) Kornelius Eilertsen	00
(Croatia) Josip Bulić	10

Round of 32
(Georgia (country)) Lasha Bekauri	11
(Hungary) Roland Gőz	00
(Belgium) Sami Chouchi	01 (yellow card)
(Bosnia and Herzegovina) Toni Miletić	00
(Spain) Tristani Mosakhlishvili	01
(Moldova) Catalin Marian	00 (yellow card)
(Croatia) Josip Bulić	00
(Azerbaijan) Eljan Hajiyev	02

Round of 16
(Georgia (country)) Lasha Bekauri	02
(Belgium) Sami Chouchi	00
(Spain) Tristani Mosakhlishvili	00
(Azerbaijan) Eljan Hajiyev	10

Quarter-finals
(Georgia (country)) Lasha Bekauri	00 (yellow card)
(Azerbaijan) Eljan Hajiyev	10

=== Pool B ===
First round
(Ukraine) Yaroslav Davydchuk	02
(Israel) Guy Gurevitch	00 (yellow card)

Round of 32
(Bulgaria) Ivaylo Ivanov	00
(Slovakia) Peter Žilka	10
(Ukraine) Yaroslav Davydchuk	01
(France) Loris Tassier	10
(Serbia) Nemanja Majdov	10 (yellow card)
(Armenia) Gor Karapetyan	00
Aliaksandr Sidoryk	00
(Romania) Alex Creţ	10

Round of 16
(Slovakia) Peter Žilka	00
(France) Loris Tassier	01
(Serbia) Nemanja Majdov	00 (yellow card)
(Romania) Alex Creţ	01

Quarter-finals
(France) Loris Tassier	00
(Romania) Alex Creţ	10

=== Pool C ===
First round
(Bosnia and Herzegovina) Lazar Ždrale	01
(Israel) Li Kochman	10 (yellow card)

Round of 32
(Hungary) Krisztián Tóth	10 (yellow card)
(Israel) Li Kochman	00
(Ukraine) Nikita Yudanov	10
(Moldova) Dorin Gotonoaga	00
Mikhail Igolnikov	00
(Netherlands) Noël van 't End	01 (yellow card)
(Spain) Daniel Nieto	10
(Germany) Eduard Trippel	00

Round of 16
(Hungary) Krisztián Tóth	10
(Ukraine) Nikita Yudanov	00
(Netherlands) Noël van 't End	02
(Spain) Daniel Nieto	00

Quarter-finals
(Hungary) Krisztián Tóth	10
(Netherlands) Noël van 't End	00

=== Pool D ===
First round
(Georgia (country)) Giorgi Jabniashvili	02
(Romania) Vlad Vişan	00
(France) Alexis Mathieu	02
(Czech Republic) Radomír Musil	00

Round of 32
(Azerbaijan) Murad Fatiyev	10 (yellow card)
(United Kingdom) Jamal Petgrave	00
(Georgia (country)) Giorgi Jabniashvili	11
(Croatia) Lovre Mrković	00 (yellow card)
(Greece) Theodoros Tselidis	00
(France) Alexis Mathieu	01
(Serbia) Darko Brašnjović	00 (yellow card)
(Estonia) Klen-Kristofer Kaljulaid	01 (yellow card)

Round of 16
(Azerbaijan) Murad Fatiyev	10
(Georgia (country)) Giorgi Jabniashvili	00
(France) Alexis Mathieu	11
(Estonia) Klen-Kristofer Kaljulaid	00 (yellow card)

Quarter-finals
(Azerbaijan) Murad Fatiyev	01
(France) Alexis Mathieu	00 (yellow card)
