= 2025 European Judo Championships – Men's 90 kg =

Judo competition

Judo Men's 90 kg at the 2025 European Judo Championships
- Venue: Morača Sports Center
- Location: Podgorica, Montenegro
- Date: 25 April 2025
- Competitors: 33 from 23 nations

Medalists
gold medal	Christian Parlati (1st title)	Italy
silver medal	Maxime-Gaël Ngayap Hambou	France
bronze medal	Murad Fatiyev	Azerbaijan
bronze medal	Ivaylo Ivanov	Bulgaria

Competition at external databases
- Links: IJF • JudoInside

The men's 90 kg competition at the 2025 European Judo Championships was held at the Morača Sports Center in Podgorica, Montenegro on 25 April 2025.

== Results ==
=== Finals ===
Semi-finals
(Serbia) Nemanja Majdov	000 (yellow card)
(France) Maxime-Gaël Ngayap Hambou	100
(Azerbaijan) Murad Fatiyev	000
(Italy) Christian Parlati	100 (yellow card)

Final
(France) Maxime-Gaël Ngayap Hambou	000 (yellow card)
(Italy) Christian Parlati	101

=== Repechage ===
Repechage
(Georgia (country)) Giorgi Jabniashvili	002
(France) Alexis Mathieu	111
(Georgia (country)) Luka Maisuradze	000
(Bulgaria) Ivaylo Ivanov	100 (yellow card)

Bronze medal
(France) Alexis Mathieu	000 (yellow card)
(Azerbaijan) Murad Fatiyev	100 (yellow card)
(Bulgaria) Ivaylo Ivanov	100
(Serbia) Nemanja Majdov	000 (yellow card)

=== Pool A ===
First round

Round of 32
(Serbia) Nemanja Majdov	001 (yellow card)
(Moldova) Vadim Ghimbovschi	000
(Bosnia and Herzegovina) Božidar Vučurević	001
(Belgium) Noah Christiaens	000
(Georgia (country)) Giorgi Jabniashvili	100
(Finland) Artur Kanevets	000
(Norway) Kornelius Eilertsen	010
(International Judo Federation) Yahor Varapayeu	000 (yellow card)

Round of 16
(Serbia) Nemanja Majdov	100
(Bosnia and Herzegovina) Božidar Vučurević	000 (yellow card)
(Georgia (country)) Giorgi Jabniashvili	110
(Norway) Kornelius Eilertsen	000 (yellow card)

Quarter-finals
(Serbia) Nemanja Majdov	001
(Georgia (country)) Giorgi Jabniashvili	000

=== Pool B ===
First round
(Slovakia) Peter Žilka	000
(Italy) Kenny Komi Bedel	100

Round of 32
(France) Alexis Mathieu	011
(Croatia) Josip Bulić	000
(Italy) Kenny Komi Bedel	001
(Israel) Guy Gurevitch	000
(France) Maxime-Gaël Ngayap Hambou	001 (yellow card)
(Bulgaria) Boris Georgiev	000 (yellow card)
(Czech Republic) David Klammert	100
(Iceland) Skarphéðinn Hjaltason	000

Round of 16
(France) Alexis Mathieu	100
(Italy) Kenny Komi Bedel	000
(France) Maxime-Gaël Ngayap Hambou	011 (yellow card)
(Czech Republic) David Klammert	000

Quarter-finals
(France) Alexis Mathieu	000 (yellow card)
(France) Maxime-Gaël Ngayap Hambou	001

=== Pool C ===
First round

Round of 32
(Georgia (country)) Luka Maisuradze	020
(Moldova) Mihail Latișev	000 (yellow card)
(Netherlands) Mark van Dijk	000 (yellow card)
(Bosnia and Herzegovina) Toni Miletić	100
(Azerbaijan) Murad Fatiyev	102
(International Judo Federation) Aliaksandr Sidoryk	000
(Serbia) Islam Šogenov	100
(Republic of Ireland) Bearach Gleeson	000

Round of 16
(Georgia (country)) Luka Maisuradze	100 (yellow card)
(Bosnia and Herzegovina) Toni Miletić	000
(Azerbaijan) Murad Fatiyev	100 (yellow card)
(Serbia) Islam Šogenov	000

Quarter-finals
(Georgia (country)) Luka Maisuradze	000 (yellow card)
(Azerbaijan) Murad Fatiyev	101 (yellow card)

=== Pool D ===
First round

Round of 32
(Greece) Theodoros Tselidis	011 (yellow card)
(Germany) Eduard Trippel	001
(Bulgaria) Ivaylo Ivanov	100 (yellow card)
(Czech Republic) Adam Kopecký	000
(Estonia) Klen-Kristofer Kaljulaid	000 (yellow card)
(Italy) Christian Parlati	100
(Slovakia) Alex Barto	100 (yellow card)
(Montenegro) Novo Raičević	000

Round of 16
(Greece) Theodoros Tselidis	000
(Bulgaria) Ivaylo Ivanov	010
(Italy) Christian Parlati	100
(Slovakia) Alex Barto	000 (yellow card)

Quarter-finals
(Bulgaria) Ivaylo Ivanov	000 (yellow card)
(Italy) Christian Parlati	100
