= 2017 European Judo Championships – Men's 90 kg =

Judo competition

Judo Men's 90 kg at the 2017 European Judo Championships
- Venue: Torwar Hall
- Location: Warsaw, Poland
- Date: 22 April
- Competitors: 34 from 28 nations

Medalists
| gold medal | Aleksandar Kukolj (1st title) | Serbia |
| silver medal | Axel Clerget | France |
| bronze medal | Beka Gviniashvili | Georgia |
| bronze medal | Khusen Khalmurzaev | Russia |

Competition at external databases
- Links: IJF • JudoInside

The men's 90 kg competition at the 2017 European Judo Championships in Warsaw was held on 22 April at the Torwar Hall.

== Results ==
=== Finals ===
Semi-finals
Axel Clerget (FRA) | 100
Khusen Khalmurzaev (RUS) | 000
Aleksandar Kukolj (SRB) | 010
Mammadali Mehdiyev (AZE) | 000

Final
Axel Clerget (FRA) | 000
Aleksandar Kukolj (SRB) | 110

=== Repechages ===
| Repechage | | Bronze medal |
| Nemanja Majdov (SRB) | 000 |
| Beka Gviniashvili (GEO) | 110 | Beka Gviniashvili (GEO) | 110 |
| | | Mammadali Mehdiyev (AZE) | 000 |

| Repechage | | Bronze medal |
| Klen-Kristofer Kaljulaid (EST) | 000 |
| Yahor Varapayeu (BLR) | 020 | Yahor Varapayeu (BLR) | 000 |
| | | Khusen Khalmurzaev (RUS) | 010 |

=== Pool A ===
First round
Ghenadie Pretivatii (MDA) | 000
Julius Sonerud (SWE) | 010

Second round
Axel Clerget (FRA) | 010
Gábor Vér (HUN) | 000
Mattias Kuusik (EST) | 010
Julius Sonerud (SWE) | 000
Noël van 't End (NED) | 030
Samuli Viitanen (FIN) | 000
Nemanja Majdov (SRB) | 100
Tobias Meier (SUI) | 000

Third round
Axel Clerget (FRA) | 100
Mattias Kuusik (EST) | 000
Noël van 't End (NED) | 000
Nemanja Majdov (SRB) | 100

Quarterfinals
Axel Clerget (FRA) | 020
Nemanja Majdov (SRB) | 000

=== Pool B ===
First round

Second round
Khusen Khalmurzaev (RUS) | 020
Nikoloz Sherazadishvili (ESP) | 010
Piotr Kuczera (POL) | 010
Peter Žilka (SVK) | 000
Beka Gviniashvili (GEO) | 110
Quedjau Nhabali (UKR) | 000
Cristian Bodîrlău (ROU) | 000
Nicholas Mungai (ITA) | 010

Third round
Khusen Khalmurzaev (RUS) | 010
Piotr Kuczera (POL) | 000
Beka Gviniashvili (GEO) | 110
Nicholas Mungai (ITA) | 000

Quarterfinals
Khusen Khalmurzaev (RUS) | 010
Beka Gviniashvili (GEO) | 000

=== Pool C ===
First round
Aigars Mīlenbergs (LAT) | 000
Ciril Grossklaus (SUI) | 100

Second round
Aleksandar Kukolj (SRB) | 100
Ciril Grossklaus (SUI) | 000
Rokas Nenartavičius (LTU) | 010
Eduard Trippel (GER) | 000
Max Stewart (GBR) | 010
Batuhan Efemgil (TUR) | 000
Klen-Kristofer Kaljulaid (EST) | 110
Patryk Ciechomski (POL) | 000

Third round
Aleksandar Kukolj (SRB) | 110
Rokas Nenartavičius (LTU) | 000
Max Stewart (GBR) | 000
Klen-Kristofer Kaljulaid (EST) | 010

Quarterfinals
Aleksandar Kukolj (SRB) | 110
Klen-Kristofer Kaljulaid (EST) | 000

=== Pool D ===
First round

Second round
Mihael Žgank (SLO) | 000
Yahor Varapayeu (BLR) | 110
Johannes Pacher (AUT) | 010
David Klammert (CZE) | 100
Mammadali Mehdiyev (AZE) | 100
Ion Dumbrava (MDA) | 000
Tiago Rodrigues (POR) | 000
Marko Bubanja (MNE) | 110

Third round
Yahor Varapayeu (BLR) | 100
David Klammert (CZE) | 000
Mammadali Mehdiyev (AZE) | 010
Marko Bubanja (MNE) | 000

Quarterfinals
Yahor Varapayeu (BLR) | 000
Mammadali Mehdiyev (AZE) | 100
