= Kyrgyzstan at the 2022 Asian Games =

- IOC code: KGZ
- NOC: National Olympic Committee of the Republic of Kyrgyzstan
- Website: olympic.kg

in Hangzhou, China 23 September 2023 – 8 October 2023
- Competitors: 181 in 25 sports
- Flag bearer: Erkin Adylbek Uulu
- Medals Ranked 18th: Gold 4 Silver 2 Bronze 9 Total 15

Asian Games appearances (overview)
- 1994; 1998; 2002; 2006; 2010; 2014; 2018; 2022; 2026

Kyrgyzstan participated at the 2022 Asian Games in Hangzhou, China. The event was originally scheduled from 10 to 25 September 2022. However, due to COVID-19 pandemic cases rising in China the event was postponed and rescheduled to September–October 2023.

== Medalists ==
The following Kyrgyzstan competitors won medals at the Games.

Medal	Name	Sport	Event	Date
Gold	Erlan Sherov	Judo	Men's –90 kg	26 Sep
Bronze	Avazbek Amanbekov	Wushu	Men's sanda 56 kg	27 Sep
Bronze	Temirlan Amankulov	Wushu	Men's sanda 70 kg	27 Sep

Medals by sport
Sport	1st place, gold medalist(s)	2nd place, silver medalist(s)	3rd place, bronze medalist(s)	Total
Judo	1	0	0	1
Wushu	0	0	2	2

Medals by day
Day	Date	1st place, gold medalist(s)	2nd place, silver medalist(s)	3rd place, bronze medalist(s)	Total
1	24 September	0	0	0	0
2	25 September	0	0	0	0
3	26 September	1	0	0	1
4	27 September	0	0	2	2

== Boxing ==
Men

Kyrgyzstan will send seven experienced male boxers to the Asian Games which starts in Hangzhou, China on September 23. The team includes medalists from the World Boxing Championships and the ASBC Asian Elite Boxing Championships.

Mr. Daniyar Tologon Uulu, Mr. Ulan Sagynbayev and Mr. Akyikat Abayev selected the boxers to the first Qualifier and the management is expecting to earn spots for the Paris 2024 Olympic Games. The Kyrgyz national team competed in several preparation events this year including the Men's Elite World Boxing Championships, the Bocskai Memorial tournament, the Belgrade winner tournament and the Shopokov Memorial tournament.

Athlete	Event	Round of 32	Round of 16	Quarter-finals	Semi-finals	Final	Rank
Athlete	Event	Opposition Result	Opposition Result	Opposition Result	Opposition Result	Opposition Result	Rank
Nurzhigit Dyushebayev	–51 kg	Huthaifa Eshish (JOR); W 5-0	Abdul Jabar (AFG); W 5-0	Tomoya Tsuboi (JPN); L 0-5	Did not advance		
Munarbek Seyitbek Uulu	–57 kg	Bye	Carlo Paalam (PHI); L 1-4	Did not advance			
Askat Kultayev	–63.5 kg	Al-Hawsaw (KSA); W KO	Shiva Thapa (IND); W 5-0	Al-Sarray (IRQ); L 2-3	Did not advance		
Nuradin Rustambek Uulu	–71 kg	Kan Chia-wei (TPE); L 1-4	Did not advance				
Omurbek Bekzhigit Uulu	–80 kg	Bye	Lakshya Chahar (IND); W 4-1	Tanglatihan (CHN); L 1-4	Did not advance		
Erkin Adylbek Uulu	–92kg	—	Bye	Davlat Boltaev (TJK); L 0-4	Did not advance		

== Judo ==
The National Judo Federation of the Kyrgyz Republic entered 11 judo practitioners (7 men's and 4 women's) to compete at the Games.

Key:

- 1st number — Ippon
- 2nd number — Waza-ari
- s — Shido

Men

Athlete	Event	Round of 32	Round of 16	Quarter-finals	Semi-finals	Repechage	Final / BM	Rank
Athlete	Event	Opposition Result	Opposition Result	Opposition Result	Opposition Result	Opposition Result	Opposition Result	Rank
Khanbolot Yrysbekov	–60 kg	Sitthisane (LAO); W 10–00s1	Yang (TPE); L 00–10	Did not advance				
Kubanychbek Aibek Uulu	–66 kg	Bye	Cheng (TPE); W 10–00	An (KOR); L 00s2–01s2	Did not advance	Bayanmönkhiin (UAE); L 00–01s1	Did not advance	
Chyngyzkhan Sagynaliev	–73 kg	Bye	Repiyallage (SRI); W 10–00s1	Hashimoto (JPN); L 00s1–10	Did not advance	Shamshayev (KAZ); L 00–10s1	Did not advance	
Asad Masabirov	–81 kg	Bye	Sun (CHN); W 01–00	Makhmadbekov (TJK); L 00–10s1	Did not advance	Gerbekov (BRN); L 00–01s1	Did not advance	
Erlan Sherov	–90 kg	Bye	Buhebilige (CHN); W 01s1–00	Caramnob (LBN); W 10–00s3	Aram (UAE); W 10s1–00s2	—	Bobonov (UZB); W 01s2–00s2	1st place, gold medalist(s)
Vladimir Zoloev	–100 kg	Bye	Wolf (JPN); L 00–10	Did not advance				
Syimyk Zhaparov	+100 kg	—	Magomedomarov (UAE); L 00s2–10s1	Did not advance				

Women

Athlete	Event	Round of 16	Quarter-finals	Semi-finals	Repechage	Final / BM	Rank
Athlete	Event	Opposition Result	Opposition Result	Opposition Result	Opposition Result	Opposition Result	Rank
Zhanar Zholdosheva	–57 kg	Lien (TPE); L 00–10	Did not advance				
Adina Kochkonbaeva	–63 kg	Dashkinova (TKM); W 10s1–00s3	Isokova (UZB); L 00s1–10s1	Did not advance	Odinaeva (TJK); W 11–00s2	Kim (KOR); L 00s1–10s1	4
Azhar Isaeva	–70 kg	Feng (CHN); L 00s1–10s1	Did not advance				
Shakhida Narmukhamedova	–78 kg	Hsu Wang (TPE); L 00s2–01s1	Did not advance				

== Kurash ==
Men

Athlete	Event	Round of 16	Quarter-finals	Semi-finals	Final	
Athlete	Event	Opposition Score	Opposition Score	Opposition Score	Opposition Score	Rank
Rustam Turusbekov	–81 kg	Bye	Huang (TPE); L 101	Did not advance		
Zhamalbek Asylbek Uulu	–90 kg	Nazarov (TJK); L 001	Did not advance			
Bekbolot Toktogonov	+90 kg	Bye	Tejenov (TKM); L 0−3	Did not advance		

Women

Athlete	Event	Round of 32	Round of 16	Quarter-finals	Semi-finals	Final	
Athlete	Event	Opposition Score	Opposition Score	Opposition Score	Opposition Score	Opposition Score	Rank
Meerim Momunova	–70 kg	—	Yu (CHN); L 0−10	Did not advance			
Dinara Kamchybekova	–70 kg	—	Tsou (TPE); L 0−3	Did not advance			
Ulanai Salieva	–87 kg	—	Bye	Bagheri (IRI); L 010	Did not advance		

== Taekwondo ==
Kyorugi

Athlete	Event	Round of 32	Round of 16	Quarter-finals	Semi-finals	Final	
Athlete	Event	Opposition Score	Opposition Score	Opposition Score	Opposition Score	Opposition Score	Rank
Aidin Altybaev	Men's −58 kg	Sainbileg (MGL); W 2–0	Khan (PAK); W 2–1	Hajimousaeinafouti (IRI); L 0–2	Did not advance		
Eldar Kurmanaliev	Men's −68 kg	Fazylov (TJK); W 2–0	Rezaei (IRI); L 0–2	Did not advance			

== Wushu ==
Sanda

Athlete	Event	Round of 16	Quarter-finals	Semi-finals	Final	
Athlete	Event	Opposition Score	Opposition Score	Opposition Score	Opposition Score	Rank
Avazbek Amanbekov	Men's –56 kg	Chunaro (NEP); W 2–0	Huanak (THA); W 2–0	Mandal (PHI); L 0–2	Did not advance	3rd place, bronze medalist(s)
Askat Omurzakov	Men's –60 kg	Tharu (NEP); W PD	Panahi (IRI); L 0–2	Did not advance		
Bakytbek Koldosh Uulu	Men's –65 kg	Phetmala (LAO); W PD	Marbun (INA); L PD	Did not advance		
Temirlan Amankulov	Men's –75 kg	Bye	Narangerel (MGL); W KO	Cai (MAC); L KO	Did not advance	3rd place, bronze medalist(s)
