= Judo at the 2022 Asian Games – Men's 90 kg =

Judo competition

Judo Men's 90 kg at the 2022 Asian Games
- Venue: Xiaoshan Linpu Gymnasium
- Location: Hangzhou, China
- Date: 26 September 2023

Medalists
gold medal	Erlan Sherov	Kyrgyzstan
silver medal	Davlat Bobonov	Uzbekistan
bronze medal	Aram Grigorian	United Arab Emirates
bronze medal	Caramnob Sagaipov	Lebanon

Competition at external databases
- Links: IJF • JudoInside

The men's 90 kilograms (middleweight) competition in Judo at the 2022 Asian Games in Hangzhou was held on 26 September 2023 at the Xiaoshan Linpu Gymnasium.

In the final, Erlan Sherov from Kyrgyzstan won the gold medal.

== Schedule ==
All times are China Standard Time (UTC+08:00)

Date	Time	Event
Tuesday, 26 September 2023	10:00	Elimination round of 16
Tuesday, 26 September 2023	10:00	Quarterfinals
Tuesday, 26 September 2023	10:00	Repechage
Tuesday, 26 September 2023	10:00	Semifinals
Tuesday, 26 September 2023	16:00	Finals

== Results ==
=== Main bracket ===
==== Final ====
Gold medal contest
Davlat Bobonov (UZB)	00
Erlan Sherov (KGZ)	01

==== Top half ====
Round of 32
Goki Tajima (JPN)	10 (yellow card)
Mämmedaly Açyldyýew (TKM)	00
Fares Badawi (PLE)	00
Ghasem Baghcheghi (IRI)	10

Round of 16
Davlat Bobonov (UZB)	10
Sulim Maraev (BHR)	00
Han Ju-yeop (KOR)	11
Goki Tajima (JPN)	01
Didar Khamza (KAZ)	10
Ghasem Baghcheghi (IRI)	00
Gantulgyn Altanbagana (MGL)	10
Faisal Jabar Khil (AFG)	00

Quarter-finals
Davlat Bobonov (UZB)	10
Han Ju-yeop (KOR)	00
Didar Khamza (KAZ)	00
Gantulgyn Altanbagana (MGL)	10

Semi-finals
Davlat Bobonov (UZB)	10 (yellow card)
Gantulgyn Altanbagana (MGL)	00 (yellow card)

==== Bottom half ====
Round of 32
~~Mohamed Rebahi (QAT)~~
Lê Anh Tài (VIE)	w/o

Round of 16
Erlan Sherov (KGZ)	01 (yellow card)
Buhebilige (CHN)	00
Caramnob Sagaipov (LBN)	10
Wei Puyang (THA)	00
Komronshokh Ustopiriyon (TJK)	10 (yellow card)
Chang Wei-cheng (TPE)	00
Aram Grigorian (UAE)	10
Lê Anh Tài (VIE)	00

Quarter-finals
Erlan Sherov (KGZ)	10
Caramnob Sagaipov (LBN)	00
Komronshokh Ustopiriyon (TJK)	01
Aram Grigorian (UAE)	11 (yellow card)

Semi-finals
Erlan Sherov (KGZ)	10 (yellow card)
Aram Grigorian (UAE)	00

=== Repechage ===
Repechage
Han Ju-yeop (KOR)	10 (yellow card)
Didar Khamza (KAZ)	00
Caramnob Sagaipov (LBN)	w/o
Komronshokh Ustopiriyon (TJK)

Bronze medal contests
Han Ju-yeop (KOR)	00
Aram Grigorian (UAE)	10 (yellow card)
Caramnob Sagaipov (LBN)	10 (yellow card)
Gantulgyn Altanbagana (MGL)	00 (yellow card)
