= Boris Rutović =

Serbian judoka (born 2006)

Personal information
- Born: 22 June 2006 (age 20)
- Occupation: Judoka

Sport
- Country: Serbia
- Sport: Judo
- Weight class: ‍–‍90 kg
- Club: Radnički Beograd

Achievements and titles
- World Champ.: (bronze) (2026)
Medal record
Men's judo
Representing Serbia
World Championships
Bronze medal – third place	2026 Baku	‍–‍90 kg
IJF Grand Slam
Gold medal – first place	2026 Astana	‍–‍90 kg
Silver medal – second place	2026 Budapest	‍–‍90 kg
Bronze medal – third place	2026 Ulaanbaatar	‍–‍90 kg
World Cadets Championships
Gold medal – first place	2023 Zagreb	‍–‍81 kg
European Cadet Championships
Gold medal – first place	2023 Odivelas	‍–‍81 kg

Profile at external databases
- IJF: 68106
- JudoInside.com: 152079
- Updated on 10 October 2026

Boris Rutović (Serbian: Борис Рутовић, born 22 June 2006) is a Serbian judoka.

== Career ==
In June 2023, Rutović competed at the 2023 European Cadet Judo Championships and won a gold medal in the –81 kg category. In August 2023, he competed at the 2023 World Judo Cadets Championships and won a gold medal in the –81 kg category.

In May 2026, he competed at the 2026 Judo Grand Slam Astana and won his first career Judo Grand Slam gold medal in the –90 kg category. During the final he defeated Brazil's Guilherme Schimidt. In September 2026, he competed at the 2026 Judo Grand Slam Budapest and won a silver medal in the –90 kg category. The next month he competed at the 2026 World Judo Championships and won a bronze medal in the –90 kg category, defeating France's Maxime-Gaël Ngayap Hambou.
