= 2020 European Judo Championships – Men's 90 kg =

Judo competition

Judo Men's 90 kg at the 2020 European Judo Championships
- Venue: O2 Arena
- Location: Prague, Czech Republic
- Date: 21 November
- Competitors: 30 from 22 nations

Medalists
gold medal	Mikhail Igolnikov (2nd title)	Russia
silver medal	Nemanja Majdov	Serbia
bronze medal	Beka Gviniashvili	Georgia
bronze medal	Mammadali Mehdiyev	Azerbaijan

Competition at external databases
- Links: IJF • JudoInside

The men's 90 kg competition at the 2020 European Judo Championships was held on 21 November at the O2 Arena.

== Results ==
=== Final ===
Semi-finals
Mikhail Igolnikov (RUS)	10
Mammadali Mehdiyev (AZE)	00
Beka Gviniashvili (GEO)	00
Nemanja Majdov (SRB)	01

Final
Mikhail Igolnikov (RUS)	10
Nemanja Majdov (SRB)	00

=== Repechage ===
Repechage
Nikoloz Sherazadishvili (ESP)	10
Krisztián Tóth (HUN)	00

Third place
Nikoloz Sherazadishvili (ESP)	00
Beka Gviniashvili (GEO)	10

Repechage
Noël van 't End (NED)	01
Mikail Özerler (TUR)	10

Third place
Mikail Özerler (TUR)	00
Mammadali Mehdiyev (AZE)	10

=== Pool A ===
Round of 32
Axel Clerget (FRA)	10
David Klammert (CZE)	00
Mikhail Igolnikov (RUS)	10
Theodoros Tselidis (GRE)	00
Milan Randl (SVK)	00
Klen-Kristofer Kaljulaid (EST)	10

Round of 16
Nikoloz Sherazadishvili (ESP)	10
Axel Clerget (FRA)	00
Mikhail Igolnikov (RUS)	10
Klen-Kristofer Kaljulaid (EST)	00

Quarterfinals
Nikoloz Sherazadishvili (ESP)	00
Mikhail Igolnikov (RUS)	10

=== Pool B ===
Round of 32
Mammadali Mehdiyev (AZE)	01
Jesper Smink (NED)	00
Nicholas Mungai (ITA)	10
Eduard Trippel (GER)	00
Krisztián Tóth (HUN)	11
Itay Golan (ISR)	00
Marko Bubanja (AUT)	00
Piotr Kuczera (POL)	10

Round of 16
Mammadali Mehdiyev (AZE)	01
Nicholas Mungai (ITA)	00
Krisztián Tóth (HUN)	10
Piotr Kuczera (POL)	00

Quarterfinals
Mammadali Mehdiyev (AZE)	01
Krisztián Tóth (HUN)	00

=== Pool C ===
Round of 32
Jiří Petr (CZE)	10
Quedjau Nhabali (UKR)	01
Beka Gviniashvili (GEO)	10
Egill Blöndal (ISL)	00
Tomasz Szczepaniak (POL)	01
Alex Creţ (ROU)	00

Round of 16
Noël van 't End (NED)	11
Jiří Petr (CZE)	00
Beka Gviniashvili (GEO)	10
Tomasz Szczepaniak (POL)	00

Quarterfinals
Noël van 't End (NED)	00
Beka Gviniashvili (GEO)	10

=== Pool D ===
Round of 32
Nemanja Majdov (SRB)	10
Li Kochman (ISR)	00
Roland Gőz (HUN)	00
Peter Žilka (SVK)	01
Mikail Özerler (TUR)	01
Falk Petersilka (GER)	00
Mattias Kuusik (EST)	00
Ciril Grossklaus (SUI)	01

Round of 16
Nemanja Majdov (SRB)	10
Peter Žilka (SVK)	00
Mikail Özerler (TUR)	10
Ciril Grossklaus (SUI)	00

Quarterfinals
Nemanja Majdov (SRB)	10
Mikail Özerler (TUR)	00
