= 2023 World Judo Cadets Championships =

Judo competition

Judo 2023 World Judo Cadets Championships
- Venue: Arena Zagreb
- Location: Zagreb, Croatia
- Dates: 23–27 August 2023
- Competitors: 576 from 64 nations
- Total prize money: €100,000

Champions
- Mixed team: France (2nd title)

Competition at external databases
- Links: IJF • JudoInside

The 2023 World Judo Cadets Championships was held at the Arena Zagreb in Zagreb, Croatia, from 23 to 27 August 2023, with the mixed teams event taking place on the competition's last day.

== Schedule ==
All times are local (UTC+2).

| | Date | Weight classes | | Preliminaries | Final Block |
| | Date | Men | Women | Preliminaries | Final Block |
|---|---|---|---|---|---|
| Day 1 | 23 August | –50, –55 | –40, –44 | 10:30 | 16:00 |
| Day 2 | 24 August | –60, –66 | –48, –52 | 8:30 | 16:00 |
| Day 3 | 25 August | –73, –81 | –57, –63 | 9:00 | 16:00 |
| Day 4 | 26 August | –90, +90 | –70, +70 | 10:30 | 16:00 |
| Day 5 | 27 August | Mixed teams | | 10:00 | 16:00 |

== Medal summary ==
=== Medal table ===
* Host nation (Croatia)

| Rank | Nation | Gold | Silver | Bronze | Total |
|---|---|---|---|---|---|
| 1 | Azerbaijan (AZE) | 2 | 4 | 3 | 9 |
| 2 | Japan (JPN) | 2 | 1 | 1 | 4 |
| 3 | Serbia (SRB) | 2 | 0 | 0 | 2 |
| 4 | Italy (ITA) | 1 | 2 | 2 | 5 |
| 5 | France (FRA) | 1 | 2 | 1 | 4 |
| 6 | Kazakhstan (KAZ) | 1 | 1 | 3 | 5 |
| 7 | Turkey (TUR) | 1 | 1 | 1 | 3 |
| 8 | Brazil (BRA) | 1 | 1 | 0 | 2 |
| 8 | Ukraine (UKR) | 1 | 1 | 0 | 2 |
| 10 | Israel (ISR) | 1 | 0 | 1 | 2 |
| 10 | Poland (POL) | 1 | 0 | 1 | 2 |
| 10 | Spain (ESP) | 1 | 0 | 1 | 2 |
| 13 | Slovakia (SVK) | 1 | 0 | 0 | 1 |
| 13 | South Korea (KOR) | 1 | 0 | 0 | 1 |
| 15 | Georgia (GEO) | 0 | 2 | 4 | 6 |
| 16 | Chinese Taipei (TPE) | 0 | 1 | 0 | 1 |
| 16 | Mongolia (MGL) | 0 | 1 | 0 | 1 |
| 18 | Uzbekistan (UZB) | 0 | 0 | 6 | 6 |
| 19 | Lithuania (LTU) | 0 | 0 | 2 | 2 |
| 20 | Austria (AUT) | 0 | 0 | 1 | 1 |
| 20 | Germany (GER) | 0 | 0 | 1 | 1 |
| 20 | India (IND) | 0 | 0 | 1 | 1 |
| 20 | Netherlands (NED) | 0 | 0 | 1 | 1 |
| 20 | Portugal (POR) | 0 | 0 | 1 | 1 |
| 20 | Sweden (SWE) | 0 | 0 | 1 | 1 |
| 20 | Tajikistan (TJK) | 0 | 0 | 1 | 1 |
| 20 | Turkmenistan (TKM) | 0 | 0 | 1 | 1 |
| Totals (27 entries) | | 17 | 17 | 34 | 68 |

=== Men's events ===
| Event | Gold | Silver | Bronze |
|---|---|---|---|
| −50 kg | Nihad Mamishov (AZE) | Mahammad Mamishov (AZE) | Francesco Crociani (ITA) |
| −50 kg | Nihad Mamishov (AZE) | Mahammad Mamishov (AZE) | Shota Bachoshvili (GEO) |
| −55 kg | Nurlan Isataev (KAZ) | Merabi Samadashvili (GEO) | Oralbek Baizak (KAZ) |
| −55 kg | Nurlan Isataev (KAZ) | Merabi Samadashvili (GEO) | Mirkhalig Iskandarov (AZE) |
| −60 kg | Izhak Ashpiz (ISR) | Mahammad Musayev (AZE) | Simas Polikevičius (LTU) |
| −60 kg | Izhak Ashpiz (ISR) | Mahammad Musayev (AZE) | Yosin Bobokalonov (TJK) |
| −66 kg | Szymon Szulik (POL) | Abil Yusubov (AZE) | Giorgi Givishvili (GEO) |
| −66 kg | Szymon Szulik (POL) | Abil Yusubov (AZE) | Inoyat Telmanov (UZB) |
| −73 kg | Lucio Tavoletta (ITA) | Tsotne Bakhtadze (GEO) | Azamat Ablakulov (UZB) |
| −73 kg | Lucio Tavoletta (ITA) | Tsotne Bakhtadze (GEO) | Suleyman Shukurov (AZE) |
| −81 kg | Boris Rutović (SRB) | Alessandro Bruno D'Urbano (ITA) | Giorgi Bendeliani (GEO) |
| −81 kg | Boris Rutović (SRB) | Alessandro Bruno D'Urbano (ITA) | Dosbol Balgabay (KAZ) |
| −90 kg | Nikita Yudanov (UKR) | Cristiano Mincinesi (ITA) | Berikbol Zhumanbekov (KAZ) |
| −90 kg | Nikita Yudanov (UKR) | Cristiano Mincinesi (ITA) | Hakimjon Makhkamov (UZB) |
| +90 kg | İbrahim Tataroğlu (TUR) | Mathéo Akiana Mongo (FRA) | Shotiko Gochiashvili (GEO) |
| +90 kg | İbrahim Tataroğlu (TUR) | Mathéo Akiana Mongo (FRA) | Ramazan Ahmadov (AZE) |

=== Women's events ===
| Event | Gold | Silver | Bronze |
|---|---|---|---|
| −40 kg | Patrícia Tománková (SVK) | Sabina Yuldashbekova (KAZ) | Dilara Kandymova (TKM) |
| −40 kg | Patrícia Tománková (SVK) | Sabina Yuldashbekova (KAZ) | Nina Auer (AUT) |
| −44 kg | Clarice Ribeiro (BRA) | Togtbaataryn Otgonjargal (MGL) | Laziza Haydarova (UZB) |
| −44 kg | Clarice Ribeiro (BRA) | Togtbaataryn Otgonjargal (MGL) | Oliviya Devi Huidrom (IND) |
| −48 kg | Aitana Diaz Hernandez (ESP) | Marharyta Miroshnichenko (UKR) | Tara Babulfath (SWE) |
| −48 kg | Aitana Diaz Hernandez (ESP) | Marharyta Miroshnichenko (UKR) | Elena Storione (ITA) |
| −52 kg | Khadizha Gadashova (AZE) | Alyssia Poulange (FRA) | Adriana Saez Hevia (ESP) |
| −52 kg | Khadizha Gadashova (AZE) | Alyssia Poulange (FRA) | Maya Toszegi (GER) |
| −57 kg | Riko Honda (JPN) | Lin Yu-han (TPE) | Hili Zakroisky (ISR) |
| −57 kg | Riko Honda (JPN) | Lin Yu-han (TPE) | Maria Silveira (POR) |
| −63 kg | Yuri Shimizu (JPN) | Sophia Câmara (BRA) | Nigina Saparboeva (UZB) |
| −63 kg | Yuri Shimizu (JPN) | Sophia Câmara (BRA) | Varvara Kuchar (LTU) |
| −70 kg | Aleksandra Andrić (SRB) | Tuana Gülenay (TUR) | Xanne van Lijf (NED) |
| −70 kg | Aleksandra Andrić (SRB) | Tuana Gülenay (TUR) | Mushtariybegim Afsalova (UZB) |
| +70 kg | Lee Hyeon-ji (KOR) | Tomoka Inoue (JPN) | Zuzanna Banaszewska (POL) |
| +70 kg | Lee Hyeon-ji (KOR) | Tomoka Inoue (JPN) | Célia Cancan (FRA) |

Source results:

=== Mixed ===
| Event | Gold | Silver | Bronze |
|---|---|---|---|
| Mixed team | France | Azerbaijan | Turkey |
| Mixed team | France | Azerbaijan | Japan |

Source results:

== Prize money ==
The sums written are per medalist, bringing the total prizes awarded to €80,000 for the individual contests and €20,000 for the team competition. (retrieved from:)

| Medal | Individual | | | Mixed team | | |
| Medal | Total | Judoka | Coach | Total | Judoka | Coach |
| Gold | €2,300 | €1,840 | €460 | €8,000 | €6,400 | €1,600 |
| Silver | €1,300 | €1,040 | €260 | €5,600 | €4,480 | €1,120 |
| Bronze | €700 | €560 | €140 | €3,200 | €2,560 | €640 |
