= Khusen Khalmurzaev =

Russian judoka (born 1993)

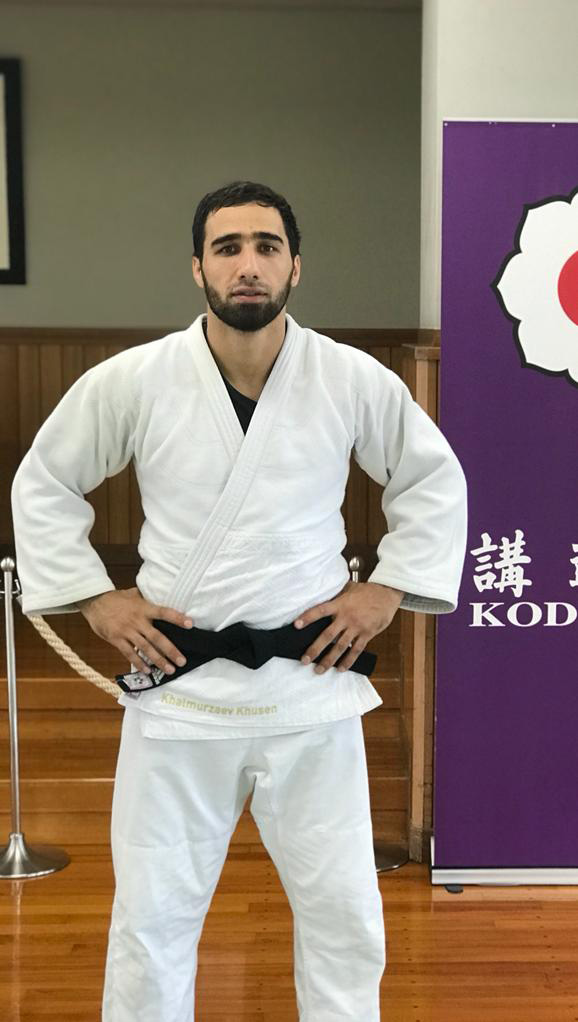

Personal information
- Nationality: Russian
- Born: 9 October 1993 (age 32) Nazran, Ingushetia, Russia
- Occupation: Judoka

Sport
- Country: Russia
- Sport: Judo
- Weight class: ‍–‍90 kg

Achievements and titles
- World Champ.: R16 (2017, 2018)
- European Champ.: (bronze) (2017, 2019)
Medal record
Men's judo
Representing Russia
World Championships
Bronze medal – third place	2018 Baku	Mixed team
Bronze medal – third place	2019 Tokyo	Mixed team
European Games
Gold medal – first place	2019 Minsk	Mixed team
Bronze medal – third place	2019 Minsk	‍–‍90 kg
European Championships
Silver medal – second place	2017 Warsaw	Men's team
Bronze medal – third place	2017 Warsaw	‍–‍90 kg
Bronze medal – third place	2018 Yekaterinburg	Mixed team
World Masters
Silver medal – second place	2016 Guadalajara	‍–‍90 kg
IJF Grand Slam
Silver medal – second place	2016 Tyumen	‍–‍90 kg
Silver medal – second place	2021 Paris	‍–‍90 kg
Bronze medal – third place	2015 Tyumen	‍–‍90 kg
IJF Grand Prix
Gold medal – first place	2016 Samsun	‍–‍90 kg
Gold medal – first place	2017 Hohhot	‍–‍90 kg
Gold medal – first place	2018 Agadir	‍–‍90 kg
Silver medal – second place	2017 Düsseldorf	‍–‍90 kg
Silver medal – second place	2019 Tashkent	‍–‍90 kg
Bronze medal – third place	2013 Almaty	‍–‍90 kg
Bronze medal – third place	2014 Budapest	‍–‍90 kg
Bronze medal – third place	2021 Zagreb	‍–‍90 kg
World Juniors Championships
Silver medal – second place	2011 Cape Town	‍–‍90 kg
European Junior Championships
Gold medal – first place	2011 Lommel	‍–‍90 kg
Gold medal – first place	2012 Poreč	‍–‍90 kg
Summer Universiade
Silver medal – second place	2015 Gwangju	‍–‍90 kg

Profile at external databases
- IJF: 9800
- JudoInside.com: 67750
- Updated on 10 November 2022

Khusen Magometovich Khalmurzaev (Russian: Хусейн Магометович Халмурзаев; born 9 October 1993) is a Russian judoka. He is the 2017 European bronze medalist in the 90 kg division. He is the twin brother of judoka Khasan.
