= Sanshiro Murao =

Japanese judoka (born 2000)

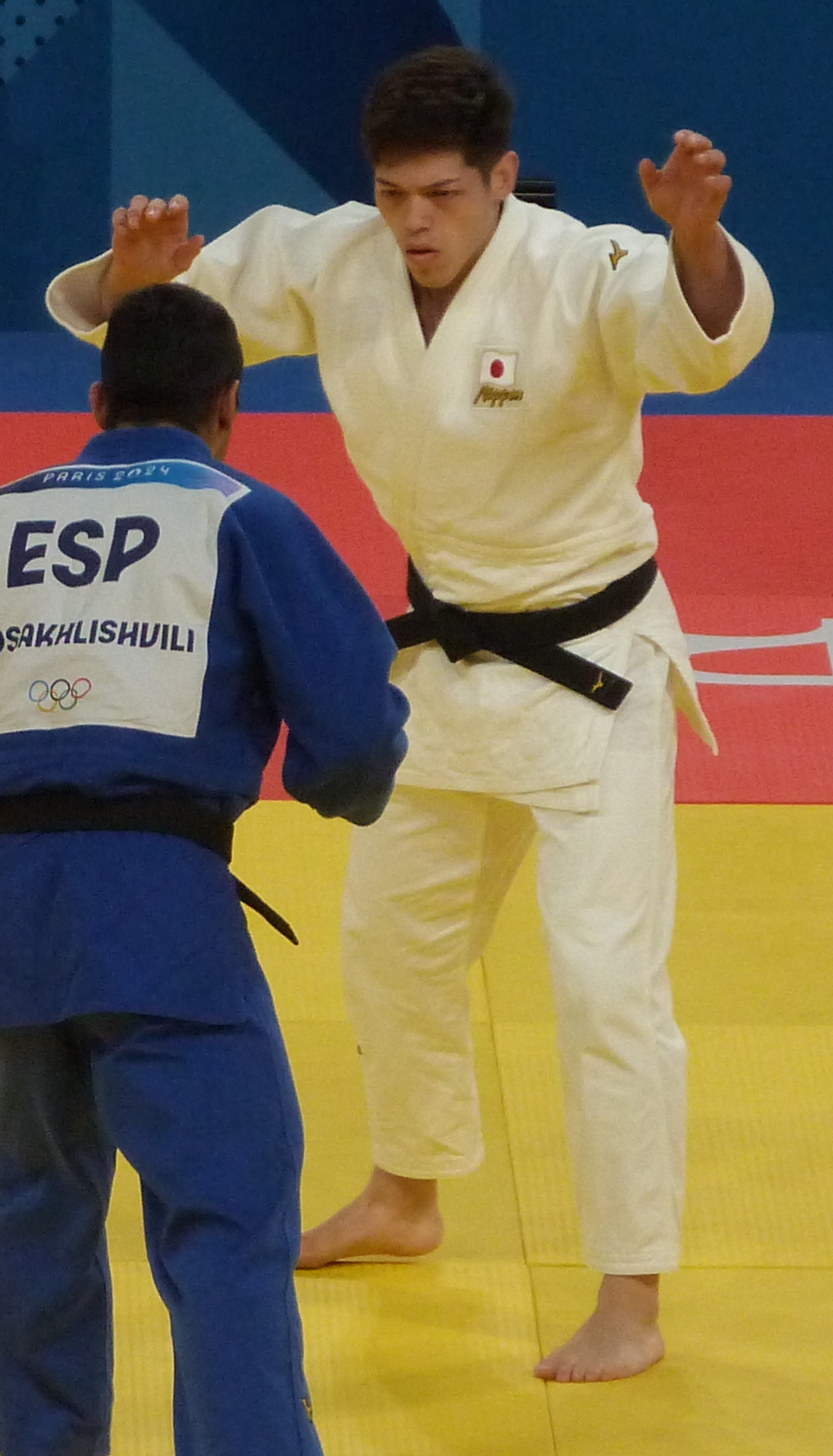
- Murao in 2024

Personal information
- Born: 28 August 2000 (age 26) New York City, New York, U.S.
- Occupation: Judoka

Sport
- Country: Japan
- Sport: Judo
- Weight class: ‍–‍90 kg

Achievements and titles
- Olympic Games: (silver) (2024)
- World Champ.: (gold) (2025, 2026)
- Asian Champ.: (gold) (2022, 2024)
- Highest world ranking: 1^{st}
Medal record
Men's judo
Representing Japan
Olympic Games
| Silver medal – second place | 2024 Paris | ‍–‍90 kg |
| Silver medal – second place | 2024 Paris | Mixed team |
World Championships
| Gold medal – first place | 2019 Tokyo | Mixed team |
| Gold medal – first place | 2023 Doha | Mixed team |
| Gold medal – first place | 2025 Budapest | ‍–‍90 kg |
| Gold medal – first place | 2026 Baku | ‍–‍90 kg |
| Gold medal – first place | 2026 Baku | Mixed team |
| Bronze medal – third place | 2023 Doha | ‍–‍90 kg |
| Bronze medal – third place | 2025 Budapest | Mixed team |
Asian Championships
| Gold medal – first place | 2022 Nur‑Sultan | ‍–‍90 kg |
| Gold medal – first place | 2024 Hong Kong | ‍–‍90 kg |
World Masters
| Gold medal – first place | 2022 Jerusalem | ‍–‍90 kg |
IJF Grand Slam
| Gold medal – first place | 2021 Kazan | ‍–‍90 kg |
| Gold medal – first place | 2022 Paris | ‍–‍90 kg |
| Gold medal – first place | 2022 Budapest | ‍–‍90 kg |
| Gold medal – first place | 2023 Tokyo | ‍–‍90 kg |
| Gold medal – first place | 2024 Antalya | ‍–‍90 kg |
| Gold medal – first place | 2024 Tokyo | ‍–‍90 kg |
| Gold medal – first place | 2025 Baku | ‍–‍90 kg |
| Gold medal – first place | 2025 Tokyo | ‍–‍90 kg |
| Gold medal – first place | 2026 Ulaanbaatar | ‍–‍90 kg |
| Silver medal – second place | 2019 Düsseldorf | ‍–‍90 kg |
| Silver medal – second place | 2023 Tashkent | ‍–‍90 kg |
| Bronze medal – third place | 2018 Osaka | ‍–‍90 kg |
| Bronze medal – third place | 2022 Tokyo | ‍–‍90 kg |
IJF Grand Prix
| Silver medal – second place | 2019 Zagreb | ‍–‍90 kg |
World Juniors Championships
| Silver medal – second place | 2018 Nassau | ‍–‍90 kg |

Profile at external databases
- IJF: 44249
- JudoInside.com: 115352
- Updated on 11 October 2026

Sanshiro Murao (村尾 三四郎, Murao Sanshirō; born 28 August 2000) is a Japanese judoka. He is a two-time world champion in his weight category, having won consecutive gold medals at the World Judo Championships in 2025 and 2026, as well as a three-time world champion with the Japanese team.

Murao has also won two silver medals at the 2024 Summer Olympics; one, individually, in his weight category, and the other with the Japanese team in the judo mixed team event.

== Early life ==
Murao was born in New York City in 2000 to a Japanese father, Hidetoshi Murao, and an American mother, Deborah Grow. The couple's youngest child, he has two older siblings, Mashu and Maya. The family would soon move to Japan, where he was raised, notably joining a judo club at the age of 5. He attended Tokai University.

== Judo Style ==
Murao is a left-handed judoka. He utilizes a heavy ashi-waza style, often scoring with o soto gari, uchimata, ashi guruma, and de ashi barai.

== Career ==
Murao won a medal at the 2019 World Judo Championships. He is a two-time world champion, winning in Budapest and Baku in succeeding years.
