= 2023 European Cadet Judo Championships =

Judo competition

Judo 2023 European Cadet Judo Championships
- Venue: Sports complex Multiusos de Odivelas
- Location: Odivelas, Portugal
- Dates: 22–25 June 2023
- Competitors: 404 from 40 nations

Champions
- Mixed team: Azerbaijan (1st title)

Competition at external databases
- Links: IJF • JudoInside

The 2023 European Cadet Judo Championships was held at the Sports complex Multiusos in Odivelas, Portugal, from 22 to 25 June 2023, with the mixed team competition taking place on the competition's last day.

== Medal table ==
* Host nation (Portugal)

Rank	Nation	Gold	Silver	Bronze	Total
1	Azerbaijan (AZE)	7	0	3	10
2	France (FRA)	2	2	6	10
3	Turkey (TUR)	2	1	4	7
4	Serbia (SRB)	1	1	3	5
5	Italy (ITA)	1	1	1	3
5	Ukraine (UKR)	1	1	1	3
7	Portugal (POR)*	1	1	0	2
8	Spain (ESP)	1	0	2	3
9	Slovakia (SVK)	1	0	0	1
10	Germany (GER)	0	2	1	3
11	Hungary (HUN)	0	2	0	2
12	Israel (ISR)	0	1	2	3
13	Croatia (CRO)	0	1	1	2
13	Netherlands (NED)	0	1	1	2
15	Austria (AUT)	0	1	0	1
15	Bulgaria (BUL)	0	1	0	1
15	Lithuania (LTU)	0	1	0	1
18	Georgia (GEO)	0	0	4	4
19	Belgium (BEL)	0	0	1	1
19	Czech Republic (CZE)	0	0	1	1
19	Estonia (EST)	0	0	1	1
19	Finland (FIN)	0	0	1	1
19	Slovenia (SLO)	0	0	1	1
Totals (23 entries)		17	17	34	68

== Medal summary ==
=== Men's events ===
Event	Gold	Silver	Bronze
−50 kg	Mahammad Mamishov; Azerbaijan	Bence Galó; Hungary	Ahmad Rustamov; Azerbaijan
−50 kg	Mahammad Mamishov; Azerbaijan	Bence Galó; Hungary	Ben Tamary; Israel
−55 kg	Mirkhalig Iskandarov; Azerbaijan	Marko Jorgić; Serbia	Gal Blažič; Slovenia
−55 kg	Mirkhalig Iskandarov; Azerbaijan	Marko Jorgić; Serbia	Amsar Dzhamaldinov; Belgium
−60 kg	Mahammad Musayev; Azerbaijan	Sebestyén Kollár; Hungary	Maxence Adriano; France
−60 kg	Mahammad Musayev; Azerbaijan	Sebestyén Kollár; Hungary	Izhak Ashpiz; Israel
−66 kg	Abil Yusubov; Azerbaijan	Rodrigo Janeiro; Portugal	Giorgi Givishvili; Georgia
−66 kg	Abil Yusubov; Azerbaijan	Rodrigo Janeiro; Portugal	Mehdi Jafarov; Azerbaijan
−73 kg	Lucio Tavoletta; Italy	Stanislav Sahir; Ukraine	Bogdan Veličković; Serbia
−73 kg	Lucio Tavoletta; Italy	Stanislav Sahir; Ukraine	Desir Zoba Casi; France
−81 kg	Boris Rutović; Serbia	Emil Valchev; Bulgaria	Dušan Grahovac; Serbia
−81 kg	Boris Rutović; Serbia	Emil Valchev; Bulgaria	Konstantin Distel; Germany
−90 kg	Nikita Yudanov; Ukraine	Cristiano Mincinesi; Italy	Fatih Dursun; Turkey
−90 kg	Nikita Yudanov; Ukraine	Cristiano Mincinesi; Italy	Luka Tevdoradze; Georgia
+90 kg	Ramazan Ahmadov; Azerbaijan	İbrahim Tataroğlu; Turkey	Shotiko Gochiashvili; Georgia
+90 kg	Ramazan Ahmadov; Azerbaijan	İbrahim Tataroğlu; Turkey	Mathéo Akiana Mongo; France

=== Women's events ===
Event	Gold	Silver	Bronze
−40 kg	Patrícia Tománková; Slovakia	Nina Auer; Austria	Megan Warners; Netherlands
−40 kg	Patrícia Tománková; Slovakia	Nina Auer; Austria	Rahime Erçin; Turkey
−44 kg	Marta Beorlegui Oses; Spain	Ronja Klein; Germany	Begümnaz Doğruyol; Turkey
−44 kg	Marta Beorlegui Oses; Spain	Ronja Klein; Germany	Rachele Moruzzi; Italy
−48 kg	Vusala Hajiyeva; Azerbaijan	Libi Becker; Israel	Aitana Diaz Hernandez; Spain
−48 kg	Vusala Hajiyeva; Azerbaijan	Libi Becker; Israel	Claudia Pla Belmonte; Spain
−52 kg	Alyssia Poulange; France	Ciska Adema; Netherlands	Alicia Marques; France
−52 kg	Alyssia Poulange; France	Ciska Adema; Netherlands	Khadizha Gadashova; Azerbaijan
−57 kg	Maria Silveira; Portugal	Odalis Santiago-Santana; Germany	Riina Myllyla; Finland
−57 kg	Maria Silveira; Portugal	Odalis Santiago-Santana; Germany	Ielena Nicolas; France
−63 kg	Sinem Oruç; Turkey	Jana Cvjetko; Croatia	Nika Markulin; Croatia
−63 kg	Sinem Oruç; Turkey	Jana Cvjetko; Croatia	Jelena Nišavić; Serbia
−70 kg	Tuana Gülenay; Turkey	Marta Navickaite; Lithuania	Anais Nebout; France
−70 kg	Tuana Gülenay; Turkey	Marta Navickaite; Lithuania	Anna Oliinyk-Korniiko; Ukraine
+70 kg	Léonie Minkada-Caquineau; France	Célia Cancan; France	Marie Žofie Košnarová; Czech Republic
+70 kg	Léonie Minkada-Caquineau; France	Célia Cancan; France	Emma-Melis Aktas; Estonia

Source results:

=== Mixed ===
Event	Gold	Silver	Bronze
Mixed team	Azerbaijan	France	Turkey
Mixed team	Azerbaijan	France	Georgia

Source results:
