= Tuana Gülenay =

Turkish judoka (born 2007)

Personal information
- Born: 14 July 2007 (age 19) Çubuk, Ankara, Turkey
- Occupation: Judoka

Sport
- Country: Turkey
- Sport: Judo
- Weight class: ‍–‍78 kg
- Rank: 1st dan black belt

Achievements and titles
- European Champ.: R16 (2026)
Medal record
Women's judo
Representing Turkey
IJF Grand Prix
Bronze medal – third place	2026 Qingdao	‍–‍78 kg
European Junior Championships
Silver medal – second place	2026 Podgorica	‍–‍78 kg
World Cadets Championships
Silver medal – second place	2023 Zagreb	‍–‍70 kg
European Cadet Championships
Gold medal – first place	2023 Odivelas	‍–‍70 kg
Mediterranean Games
Gold medal – first place	2026 Taranto	‍–‍78 kg
Bronze medal – third place	2026 Taranto	Mixed team

Profile at external databases
- IJF: 67034
- JudoInside.com: 153378
- Updated on 7 September 2026

Tuana Gülenay (born 14 July 2007) is a Turkish female judoka competing in the half-heavyweight (‍–‍78 kg) division.

== Sport career ==
Gülenay wears the Dan 1 of the black belt, and is a member of İstanbul BB.

She won the gold medal in the −70 kg event at the 2023 European Cadet Championships in Odivelas, Portugal, another gold medal at the Teplice Cadet European Cup 2023 in the Czech Republic, and the silver medal at the 2023 World Cadets Championships in Zagreb, Croatia. The gold medal in the mixed Team event at the 2023 European Youth Summer Olympic Festival in Maribor, Slovenia, went to Turkey team, she was a part of.

She was not able to advance from the round of 16 in the group stage at the 2026 European Championships in Tbilisi, Georgia. At the 2026 Grand Prix Qingdao in China, she took a bronze medal. She captured the gold medals at the Sarajevo Senior European Cup 2026 in Bosnia and Herzegovina, and at the 2026 Mediterranean Games in Taranto, Italy.

== Personal life ==
Born on 14 July 2007, Gülenay is a native of Çubuk in Ankara Province, Turkey.

She is a student in the Department of Coaching Education at the Faculty of Sports Sciences, in Zonguldak Bülent Ecevit University.
