= Tristani Mosakhlishvili =

Georgian-Spanish judoka (born 1997)

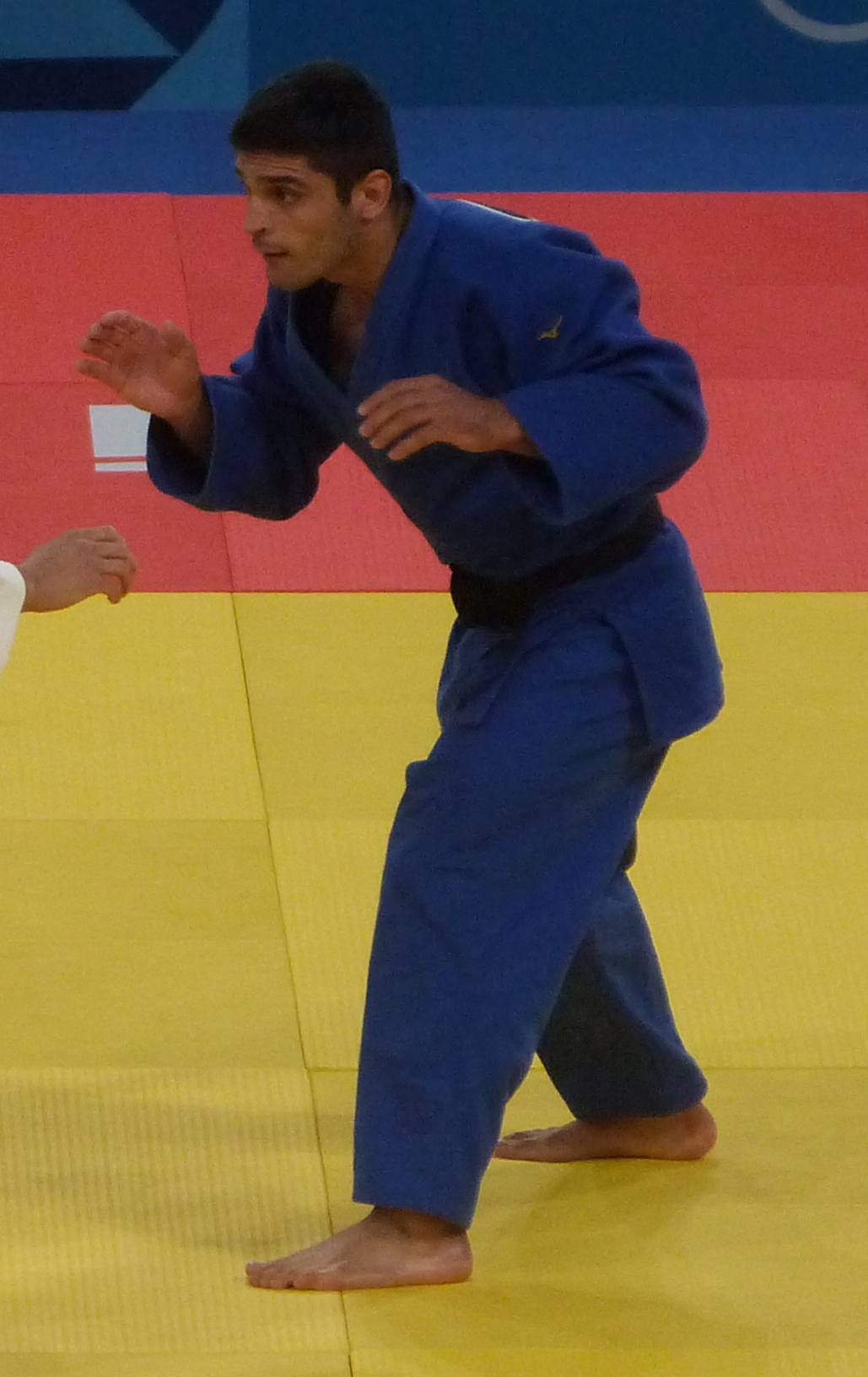

Personal information
- Native name: ტრისტან მოსახლიშვილი
- Born: 31 December 1997 (age 28) Telavi, Georgia
- Occupation: Judoka

Sport
- Country: Spain
- Sport: Judo
- Weight class: ‍–‍81 kg, ‍–‍90 kg

Achievements and titles
- Olympic Games: 5th (2024)
- World Champ.: (bronze) (2024)
- European Champ.: R16 (2024)
Medal record
Men's judo
Representing Spain
World Championships
Bronze medal – third place	2024 Abu Dhabi	‍–‍90 kg
IJF Grand Slam
Gold medal – first place	2023 Astana	‍–‍90 kg
Silver medal – second place	2023 Abu Dhabi	‍–‍90 kg
IJF Grand Prix
Silver medal – second place	2024 Linz	‍–‍90 kg
Mediterranean Games
Bronze medal – third place	2022 Oran	‍–‍90 kg

Profile at external databases
- IJF: 67918
- JudoInside.com: 36726
- Updated on 31 July 2024

Tristani Mosakhlishvili (Georgian: ტრისტან მოსახლიშვილი; born 31 December 1997) is a judoka. He is a bronze medalist from the 2024 World Championships and the 2022 Mediterranean Games. Born in Georgia, he competes for Spain at an international level.

== Career ==
In 2017, at the Georgian Judo Championships, Mosakhlishvili finished in fifth place in the 81 kg (179 lb) category. In 2020, he won a bronze medal at the Spanish Championship, also in the 81 kg (179 lb) category, and in 2021 he won the Spanish Championship in the 90 kg (200 lb) category, in which he competes to this day. At the beginning of July 2022, at the Mediterranean Games in Oran, he defeated the Italian Gennaro Pirelli in the one of two the bronze medal matches. In October 2022, at the World Championships in Tashkent, Mosakhlishvili lost in the quarterfinals to Georgian Luka Maisuradze, and in the bronze medal match he lost to another Georgian, Lasha Bekauri.

In the spring of 2024, at the pre-Olympic World Championships, which took place in the United Arab Emirates, Tristan won a bronze medal. In one of the third place matches, he defeated his opponent from Lebanon, Caramnob Sagaipov.
