= Aram Grigorian =

Russian judoka (born 1998)

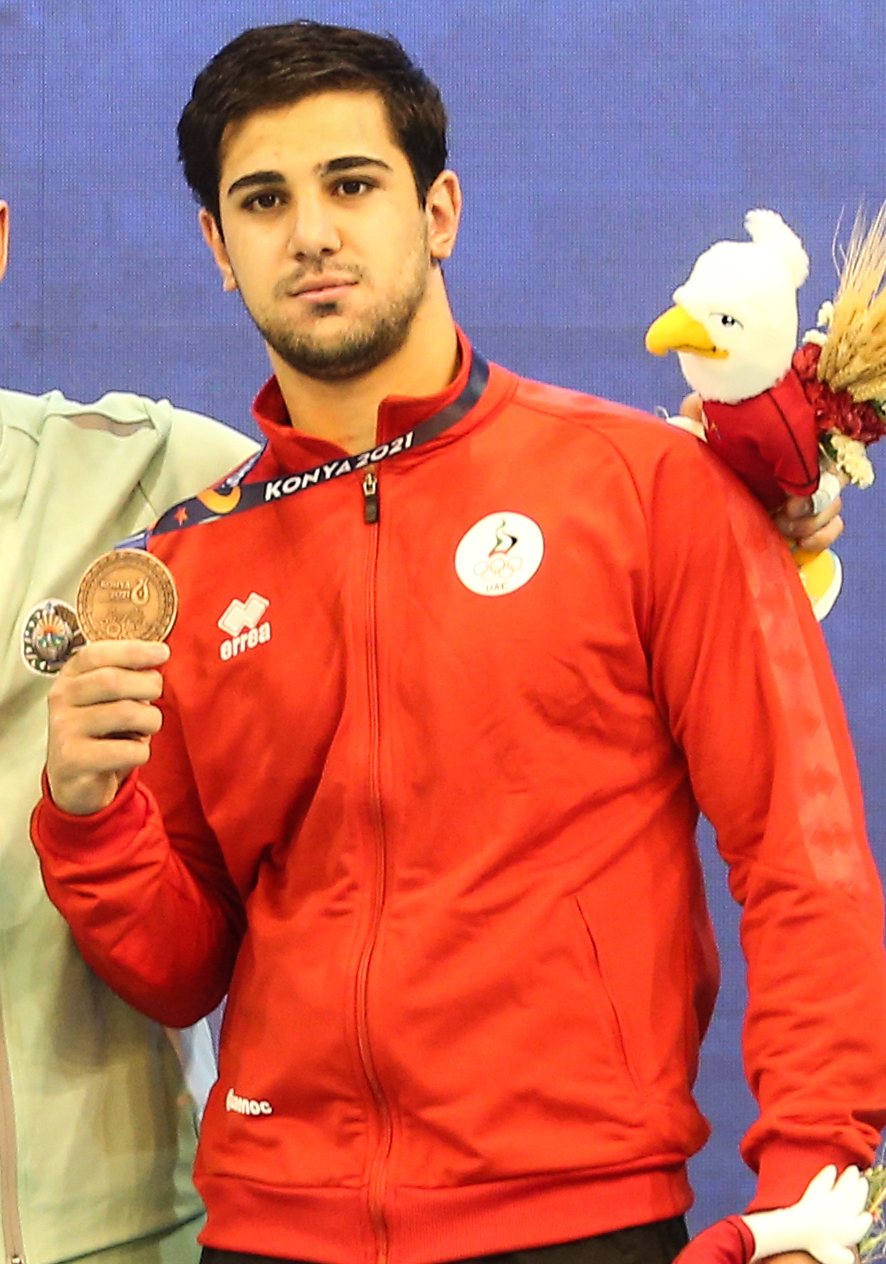
- Grigorian with the UAE team at the 2021 Islamic Solidarity Games

Personal information
- Native name: Арам Саркисович Григорян
- Full name: Aram Sarkisovich Grigorian
- Born: 9 June 1998 (age 28) Fryazino, Moscow Oblast, Russia
- Occupation: Judoka
- Height: 180 cm (5 ft 11 in)

Sport
- Country: Russia (until 2022); United Arab Emirates (since 2022)
- Sport: Judo
- Weight class: ‍–‍90 kg
- Rank: 1st dan black belt

Achievements and titles
- Olympic Games: 7th (2024)
- World Champ.: R32 (2023, 2024)
- Asian Champ.: (bronze) (2023)
Medal record
Men's judo
Representing United Arab Emirates
Asian Games
Bronze medal – third place	2023 Hangzhou	‍–‍90 kg
Islamic Solidarity Games
Bronze medal – third place	2021 Konya	‍–‍90 kg
Representing Russia
European Junior Championships
Bronze medal – third place	2017 Maribor	Men's team
World Cadets Championships
Silver medal – second place	2015 Sarajevo	Men's team
European Cadet Championships
Bronze medal – third place	2015 Sofia	Men's team
Men's sambo
Representing Russia
World Championships
Gold medal – first place	2019 Seoul	‍–‍82 kg
World Cup
Silver medal – second place	2021 Moscow	‍–‍88 kg
European Cup
Gold medal – first place	2019 Karlovy Vary	‍–‍90 kg

Profile at external databases
- IJF: 22173, 66893
- JudoInside.com: 63409, 46337
- Updated on 10 March 2025

Aram Sarkisovich Grigorian (Russian: Арам Саркисович Григорян, born 9 June 1998) is a Russian-Emirati judoka and sambo competitor of Armenian origin. 2019 world sambo champion. 2021 Islamic Solidarity Games and 2022 Asian Games bronze medalist. Honoured master of sport in sambo.

== Background ==
Aram was born in Fryazino that based near Moscow. He started sambo and judo at the age of five in «Sambo-70» club. His first coaches were 3 time sambo world champion Viktor Astakhov, world cup winner Dmitrii Kletskov, Soviet championships bronze medalist Rudolf Babayan and Vladimir Taktashev.

== Career ==
=== Sambo ===
Girogrian has many achievements in sambo on national and international circuit. As a cadet athlete, he has a bronze medal at the European championships in Tallinn, Estonia. In 2 years later, he won Russian in Kstovo and world championships in Limassol, Cyprus. In 2016, he won Russian junior championships and as the Russian national champion he competed at the world championships Bucharest, Romania. In the semi-finals, he was eliminated by Georgia's Luka Maisuradze, but went on to wrestle back and win a bronze medal against Kanatbek Uulu Anarbek from Kyrgyzstan. In February 2018, he won Russian championships. In October 2018, he earned his first world gold medal at the world championships in Tbilisi, Georgia. In the final match, he over Zhasur Sodikov of Uzbekistan. During the 2019, he won the U23 Russian championships, senior Russian nationals, senior European cup and senior world championships in Seoul, South Korea. In 2020, he won the second gold medal at the U23 Russian championships and senior Russian championships bronze medal. A year later he again won a bronze medal at the senior national championships.

=== Judo ===
On 5 March, 2022, he competed at the European cup held in Prague, Czechia, where he took one of the bronze medals at 90 kg. That same year, he went on to place 3rd at the Asian Games in Hangzhou, China.

== Achievements ==
Sambo

- 2012 Cadet European championships — 3rd.
- 2014 Cadet Russian championships — 1st.
- 2014 Cadet World championships — 1st.
- 2016, 2018 U20 Russian championships — 1st.
- 2016 U20 World championships — 3rd.
- 2018 U20 World championships — 1st.
- 2019, 2020 U23 Russian championships — 1st.
- 2019 Russian national championships — 1st.
- 2019 European cup — 1st.
- 2019 World championships — 1st.
- 2020, 2021 Russian national championships — 3rd.

Judo

- 2022 European cup — 3rd.
- 2022 Asian Games — 3rd.
