= John Jayne =

British-American judoka (born 1997)

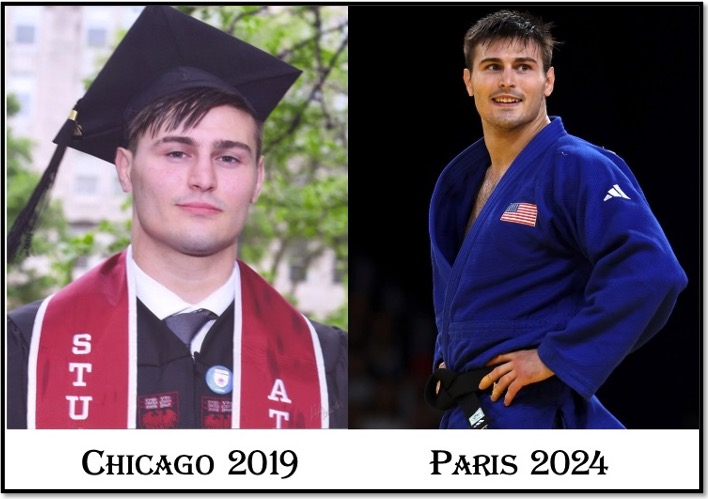

Personal information
- Nationality: American; British; Bulgarian
- Born: 4 March 1997 (age 29) London, England
- Education: University of Chicago (BA); King's College London (MSc)
- Occupation: Judoka

Sport
- Country: United States; Great Britain (until 2013)
- Sport: Judo
- Weight class: ‍–‍90 kg
- Rank: 5th dan black belt

Achievements and titles
- Olympic Games: R16 (2024)
- World Champ.: R32 (2025)
- Pan American Champ.: (silver) (2024, 2026)
Medal record
Men's judo
Representing United States
Pan American Championships
| Silver medal – second place | 2024 Rio de Janeiro | ‍–‍90 kg |
| Silver medal – second place | 2026 Panama City | ‍–‍90 kg |
| Bronze medal – third place | 2022 Lima | ‍–‍90 kg |
| Bronze medal – third place | 2023 Calgary | ‍–‍90 kg |
| Bronze medal – third place | 2025 Santiago | ‍–‍90 kg |
Pan American Junior Championships
| Gold medal – first place | 2017 Cancún | ‍–‍100 kg |

Profile at external databases
- IJF: 15253
- JudoInside.com: 54837
- Updated on 23 April 2026

John Jayne (/ˈdʒeɪn/ JAYN; born 4 March 1997) is a judoka. A triple national born and raised in England, he has represented both Great Britain and the United States. Most recently, he competed for the latter at the 2024 Summer Olympics.

== Early life and education ==
Jayne was born and raised in London to an American father and a Bulgarian mother. He took his first judo class at the Budokwai in Chelsea at age 3 and went on to train at Moberly Stars Judo in Queen's Park. Growing up in London representing the Moberly Stars Judo Club he set an all time British record by winning the British Judo Association National Age Banded Championships ten times.

| Year | Event | Weight | Result | Location | Source |
|---|---|---|---|---|---|
| 2007 | BJA National Age-Banded Championships — A Band | −34 kg | Gold | Sheffield, England (iceSheffield) | Moberly JC – Jayne titles list • Tonbridge JC note (Sheffield 2007) |
| 2008 | BJA National Age-Banded Championships — A Band | −38 kg | Gold | Sheffield, England (iceSheffield) | Moberly JC – Jayne titles list • Battlehill JC note (Sheffield 2008) |
| 2009 | British Championships — Pre-Cadet (Age-Band B) | −46 kg | Gold | Sheffield, England (iceSheffield) | Moberly JC – Jayne titles list • British Championships 2009 results |
| 2010 | British Championships — Pre-Cadet (Age-Band B) | −55 kg | Gold | Sheffield, England (iceSheffield) | Moberly JC – Jayne titles list • British Championships 2010 results |
| 2011 | British Championships — Cadet (Age-Band C) | −73 kg | Gold | Sheffield, England (iceSheffield) | Moberly JC – Jayne titles list • British Championships 2011 results |
| 2012 | British Championships — Cadet (Age-Band C) | −90 kg | Gold | Sheffield, England (iceSheffield) | Moberly JC – Jayne titles list • Event information (2012) |
| 2013 (Jan) | British Championships — Cadet (Age-Band C) | −90 kg | Gold | Sheffield, England (EIS Sheffield) | Moberly JC news (Jan 2013) • Event hub (EIS Sheffield) |
| 2013 (Dec) | British Championships — Cadet (Age-Band C) | +90 kg | Gold | Sheffield, England (EIS Sheffield) | BJA report – cadets • Event weekend in Sheffield |
| 2013 (Dec) | British Championships — Junior (Age-Band D) | −100 kg | Gold | Sheffield, England (EIS Sheffield) | BJA report – juniors • BJA news follow-up |
| 2014 (Dec) | British Championships — Junior (Age-Band D) | −100 kg | Gold | Sheffield, England (EIS Sheffield) | BJA results post • Event information (2014) |

He represented Great Britain until 2013. In 2013 he was Cadet National Champion in three countries – USA, Great Britain and Bulgaria; and, representing the United States, was 2013 World/Open European Sambo Champion – Cadets at +84 kg in Riga, Latvia. Also in 2013 he was a Bronze Medalist at the EYOF (European Youth Olympics Festival) at -90 kg in Utrecht, Netherlands. In addition, in 2014, Jayne placed 7th at USAW Junior Greco Nationals. In 2017 he was U21 Pan American Champion in Cancun and Senior US National Champion in Salt Lake City, both at -100 kg. He received the USJA 2017 Male Athlete of the Year Award.

Jayne competed in Sambo events, representing the United States, between 2013 and 2016. In 2013 he won the World/Open European Cadet Sambo Championship. In 2016 he won the senior USA Sambo National Championship in Joliet, Illinois, and he won Bronze at the Senior 2016 Sambo World Cup “Kharlampiev Memorial” in Moscow, Russia, both at -90 kg.

| Year | Event | Weight | Result | Location | Source |
|---|---|---|---|---|---|
| 2013 (Sep 13–16) | World/Open European SAMBO Championship — Cadets | +84 kg | Gold | Riga, Latvia | |
| 2016 (Mar 26) | World SAMBO Cup “Kharlampiev Memorial” | −90 kg | Bronze | Moscow, Russia | |
| 2016 (May 28) | USA SAMBO Championship (US Open) — Joliet | −90 kg | Gold | Joliet, Illinois, USA | |

Jayne competed in judo events in the United States between 2007 and 2017. At the 45th USJF Junior National Judo Championships in Chicago, Illinois, in July 2008, he was awarded the “Outstanding Male Competitor Prize”. At the 2017 USA Junior Olympic National and International Championships on 16–18 June 2017, in Spokane, Washington, Jayne won all matches by ippon in under a minute and was awarded the “Male Best Technique Award” over the two days.

| Year | Event | Division / Weight | Result | City & State |
|---|---|---|---|---|
| 2007 (Jul 14–15) | 44th USJF Junior National Judo Championships | Boys Intermediate 1 −34 kg | Gold | Ypsilanti, Michigan (EMU Convocation Center) |
| 2008 (Jul 5–6) | 45th USJF Junior National Judo Championships | Boys Intermediate 2 −38 kg | Gold | Chicago, Illinois |
| 2013 (Mar 23–24) | USA Judo National Youth & Scholastic Championships | Cadet +90 kg | Gold | Doral, Florida |
| 2013 (Nov 24) | USA Judo President’s Cup | −100 kg | Gold | Dallas, Texas |
| 2017 (Apr 29) | USA Judo Senior National Championships | −100 kg | Gold | Salt Lake City, Utah |
| 2017 (Jun 16–18) | USA Judo Junior Olympic National and International Championships | −100 kg | Gold | Spokane, Washington |

Jayne was also active in the British Wrestling Association from 2009 to 2014.

| Year | Event | Weight | Result | Location | Source |
|---|---|---|---|---|---|
| 2009 | Christolutte International (US Créteil) | — | Gold | Créteil, France | Tournament info • Club record |
| 2010 | English Junior Championships | 50 kg | Gold | Stockton-on-Tees, England (Thornaby Pavilion) | Results |
| 2010 | British Junior Championships | 56 kg | Gold | Bolton, England (Bolton Arena) | Results |
| 2011 | British Junior Championships | 73 kg | Gold | Croydon, England (Whitgift School) | Results |
| 2012 | 22nd Nègrepelisse International Tournament | — | Gold | Nègrepelisse, France | BWA report |
| 2014 | English Junior Championships | 96 kg | Gold | Twickenham, England (St Mary's University) | Results |

Jayne completed his GCSE and A Levels at the Mander Portman Woodward school in London. He went on to graduate from the University of Chicago with a BA in Mathematics in 2019 and from King's College London with an MSc in Mathematics in 2022. While at the University of Chicago, Jayne did collegiate wrestling, before switching his focus back to judo upon graduation.

== Career ==
He was a bronze medallist in the 90 kg category at the 2022 Pan American-Oceania Judo Championships in Lima, Peru.

He was a bronze medalist in the 90 kg category at the 2023 Pan American-Oceania Judo Championships in Calgary, Canada.

He was a silver medalist in the 90 kg category at the 2024 Pan American-Oceania Judo Championships in Rio de Janeiro, Brazil. He was subsequently selected for the 2024 Paris Olympics to compete in the men's 90 kg.

In the Paris Olympics, he defeated former vice world champion Christian Parlati in the preliminary round before being knocked out by Han Ju-yeop in the Round of 16.

He was a bronze medalist in the 90 kg category at the 2025 Pan American-Oceania Judo Championships in Santiago, Chile.

He was a silver medalist in the 90 kg category at the 2026 Pan American Judo Championships in Panama City, Panama.
