= Han Ju-yeop =

South Korean judoka (born 1999)

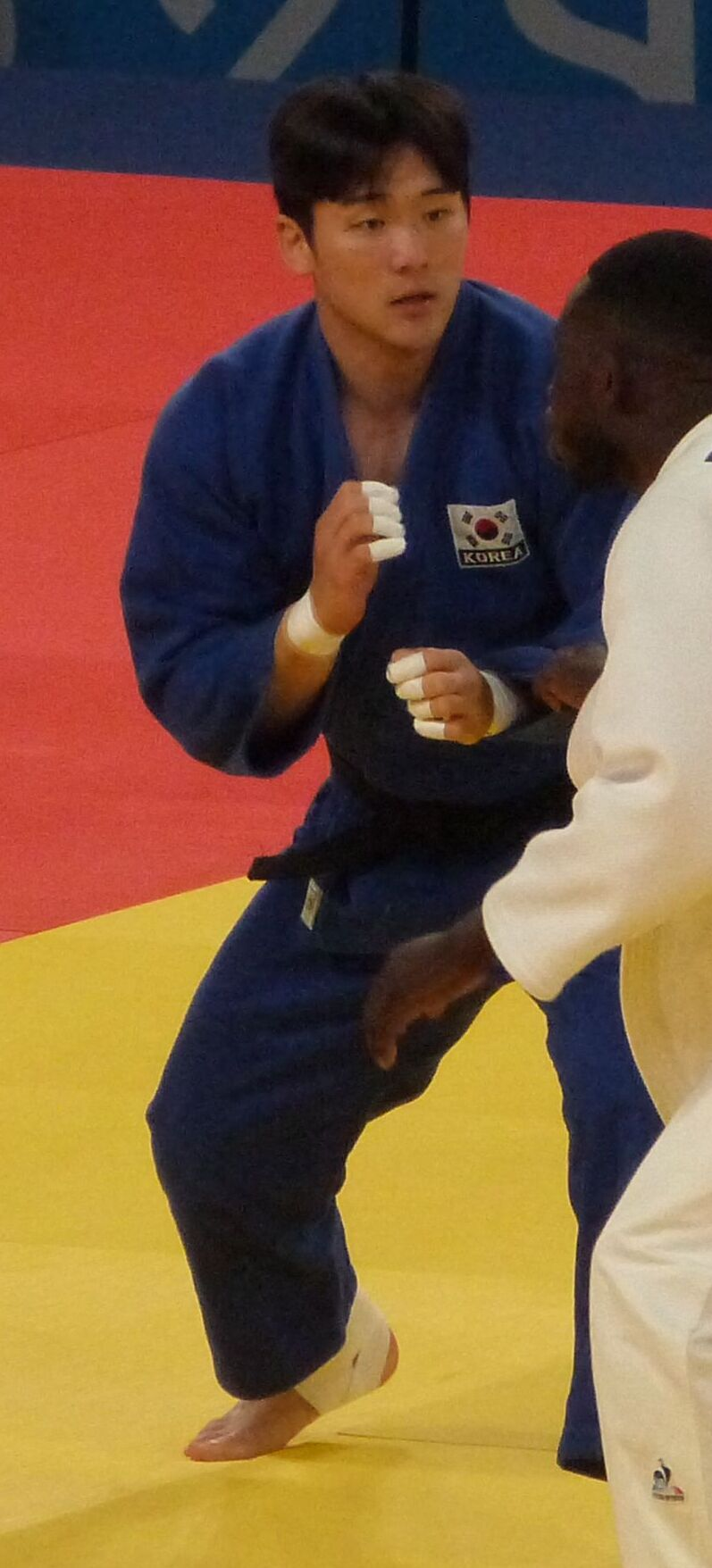

Personal information
- Native name: 한주엽
- Born: 21 April 1999 (age 27)
- Occupation: Judoka

Sport
- Country: South Korea
- Sport: Judo
- Weight class: ‍–‍90 kg

Achievements and titles
- Olympic Games: 7th (2024)
- World Champ.: R16 (2021, 2022, 2024)
- Asian Champ.: (bronze) (2024)
Medal record
Men's judo
Representing South Korea
Olympic Games
Bronze medal – third place	2024 Paris	Mixed team
Asian Games
Bronze medal – third place	2026 Aichi‑Nagoya	‍–‍100 kg
Asian Championships
Bronze medal – third place	2024 Hong Kong	‍–‍90 kg
IJF Grand Slam
Bronze medal – third place	2024 Tbilisi	‍–‍90 kg
Bronze medal – third place	2024 Dushanbe	‍–‍90 kg
Bronze medal – third place	2026 Tashkent	‍–‍100 kg
Asian Junior Championships
Bronze medal – third place	2018 Beirut	‍–‍90 kg
Asian Cadet Championships
Gold medal – first place	2016 Kochi	‍–‍81 kg
World University Games
Silver medal – second place	2021 Chengdu	‍–‍90 kg
Bronze medal – third place	2021 Chengdu	Men's Team

Profile at external databases
- IJF: 34570
- JudoInside.com: 107669
- Updated on 2 October 2026

Han Ju-yeop (born 21 April 1999) is a South Korean judoka. He won a bronze medal at the 2024 Asian Judo Championships and competed at the 2024 Summer Olympics.

== Career ==
He won silver at the delayed 2021 Summer World University Games in Chengdu in 2022. He contested a bronze medal match at the 2022 Asian Games but was defeated by Aram Grigorian.

He won a bronze medal at the 2024 Judo Grand Slam Tbilisi in March 2024. He won bronze in the 90 kg category at the 2024 Asian Championships in Hong Kong in April 2024. He won bronze at the 2024 Judo Grand Slam Dushanbe in Tajikistan in May 2024.

He was selected for the 2024 Summer Olympics in the Men's 90 kg.
