= Eljan Hajiyev =

Azerbaijani judoka (born 2002)

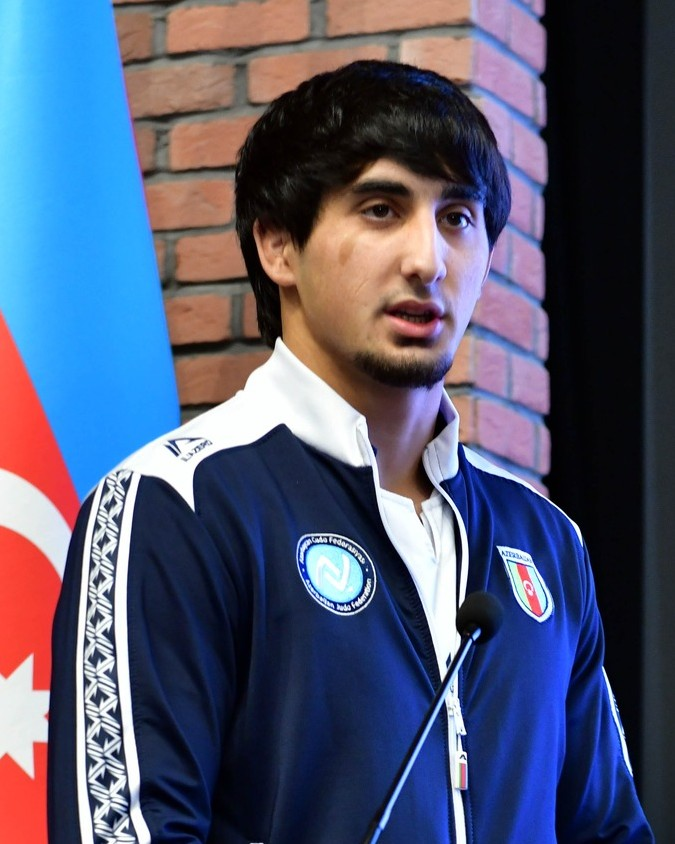

Personal information
- Born: 29 April 2002 (age 24)
- Occupation: Judoka

Sport
- Country: Azerbaijan
- Sport: Judo
- Weight class: ‍–‍90 kg

Achievements and titles
- Olympic Games: R16 (2024)
- World Champ.: (bronze) (2025)
- European Champ.: (gold) (2024)
- Highest world ranking: 2^{nd}
Medal record
Men's judo
Representing Azerbaijan
World Championships
Bronze medal – third place	2025 Budapest	‍–‍90 kg
European Championships
Gold medal – first place	2024 Zagreb	‍–‍90 kg
IJF Grand Slam
Gold medal – first place	2025 Dushanbe	‍–‍90 kg
Silver medal – second place	2024 Paris	‍–‍90 kg
Silver medal – second place	2024 Tbilisi	‍–‍90 kg
Bronze medal – third place	2021 Baku	‍–‍81 kg
Bronze medal – third place	2022 Tbilisi	‍–‍81 kg
Bronze medal – third place	2024 Astana	‍–‍90 kg
IJF Grand Prix
Silver medal – second place	2023 Almada	‍–‍81 kg
Bronze medal – third place	2023 Dushanbe	‍–‍90 kg
Bronze medal – third place	2024 Odivelas	‍–‍90 kg
World University Games
Silver medal – second place	2025 Essen	‍–‍90 kg
World Juniors Championships
Bronze medal – third place	2021 Olbia	‍–‍81 kg
Bronze medal – third place	2022 Guayaquil	‍–‍81 kg
European Junior Championships
Gold medal – first place	2022 Prague	‍–‍81 kg

Profile at external databases
- IJF: 51107
- JudoInside.com: 128695
- Updated on 29 July 2025

Eljan Hajiyev (born 29 April 2002) is an Azerbaijani judoka. He won gold at the 2024 European Championships in Zagreb and was a bronze medalist at the 2025 World Championships in Budapest. He competed at the 2024 Summer Olympics.

== Early life ==
He took up judo when he was ten years-old.

== Career ==
Hajiyev won a bronze medal at the 2021 and 2022 World Juniors Championships. He won gold at the 2022 European Junior Championships in Prague in the 81 kg category.

Hajiyev won a bronze medal at 2024 Odivelas Grand Prix in January 2024 in the 90 kg division. He won a silver medal at the 2024 Paris Grand Slam in the 90 kg category. He won a silver medal at the 2024 Tbilisi Grand Slam in March 2024.

Hajiyev won gold at the 2024 European Championships in Zagreb in April 2024, defeating Olympic Games champion Lasha Bekauri. He won bronze at 2024 Astana Grand Slam in May 2024. He competed at the 2024 World Championships in Abu Dhabi. He was selected for the 2024 Paris Olympics.

After the Olympics Hajiyev had shoulder and knee surgery and missed many months of training. After his return, he won at the 2025 Dushanbe Grand Slam in May 2025, defeating compatriot Vugar Talibov in the final. He won a bronze medal in the 90 kg category at the 2025 World Championships in Budapest, Hungary, defeating Estonian Klen-Kristofer Kaljulaid in the bronze medal match having lost against Goki Tajima in the semi-final. In July, he won the silver medal in the 90 kg category at the 2025 World University Games in Essen, Germany.

As of April 1, 2026, with a score of 370 points, holds fifth place in the ranking of Azerbaijani athletes according to the Ministry of Youth and Sports.
