= Murad Fatiyev =

Azerbaijani judoka (born 1999)

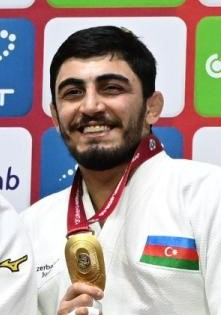

Personal information
- Born: 2 April 1999 (age 27) Sumgait, Azerbaijan
- Occupation: Judoka

Sport
- Country: Azerbaijan
- Sport: Judo
- Weight class: ‍–‍81 kg, ‍–‍90 kg

Achievements and titles
- Olympic Games: R16 (2020)
- World Champ.: (bronze) (2026)
- European Champ.: (bronze) (2025)
Medal record
Men's judo
Representing Azerbaijan
World Championships
Bronze medal – third place	2026 Baku	‍–‍90 kg
European Championships
Bronze medal – third place	2025 Podgorica	‍–‍90 kg
IJF Grand Slam
Gold medal – first place	2024 Baku	‍–‍90 kg
Gold medal – first place	2026 Tashkent	‍–‍90 kg
Silver medal – second place	2023 Paris	‍–‍90 kg
Bronze medal – third place	2021 Tbilisi	‍–‍81 kg
Bronze medal – third place	2021 Antalya	‍–‍81 kg
Bronze medal – third place	2021 Kazan	‍–‍81 kg
Bronze medal – third place	2024 Abu Dhabi	‍–‍90 kg
Bronze medal – third place	2026 Ulaanbaatar	‍–‍90 kg
IJF Grand Prix
Gold medal – first place	2023 Perth	‍–‍90 kg
Silver medal – second place	2025 Lima	‍–‍90 kg
Bronze medal – third place	2019 Perth	‍–‍81 kg
Bronze medal – third place	2025 Guadalajara	‍–‍90 kg
Bronze medal – third place	2026 Qingdao	‍–‍90 kg
European Junior Championships
Silver medal – second place	2017 Maribor	‍–‍73 kg
Bronze medal – third place	2018 Sofia	‍–‍81 kg

Profile at external databases
- IJF: 20741
- JudoInside.com: 96617
- Updated on 8 October 2026

Murad Fatiyev (born 2 April 1999) is an Azerbaijani judoka.

He is the bronze medallist at the 2021 Judo Grand Slam Tbilisi and is scheduled to represent Azerbaijan at the 2020 Summer Olympics.

On October 8, 2026, at the World Judo Championships in Baku, he defeated Theodoros Tselidis of Greece in the round of 16, defeated Estonian Klen-Kristofer Kaljulaid in the round of 8, defeated Alexa Mitrovic of France in the quarterfinals, lost in the semifinals to Japanese judoka Goki Tajima, and in the bronze medal match he defeated Serbian athlete Nemanja Majdov and won the bronze medal.
