= Maxime-Gaël Ngayap Hambou =

French judoka (born 2001)

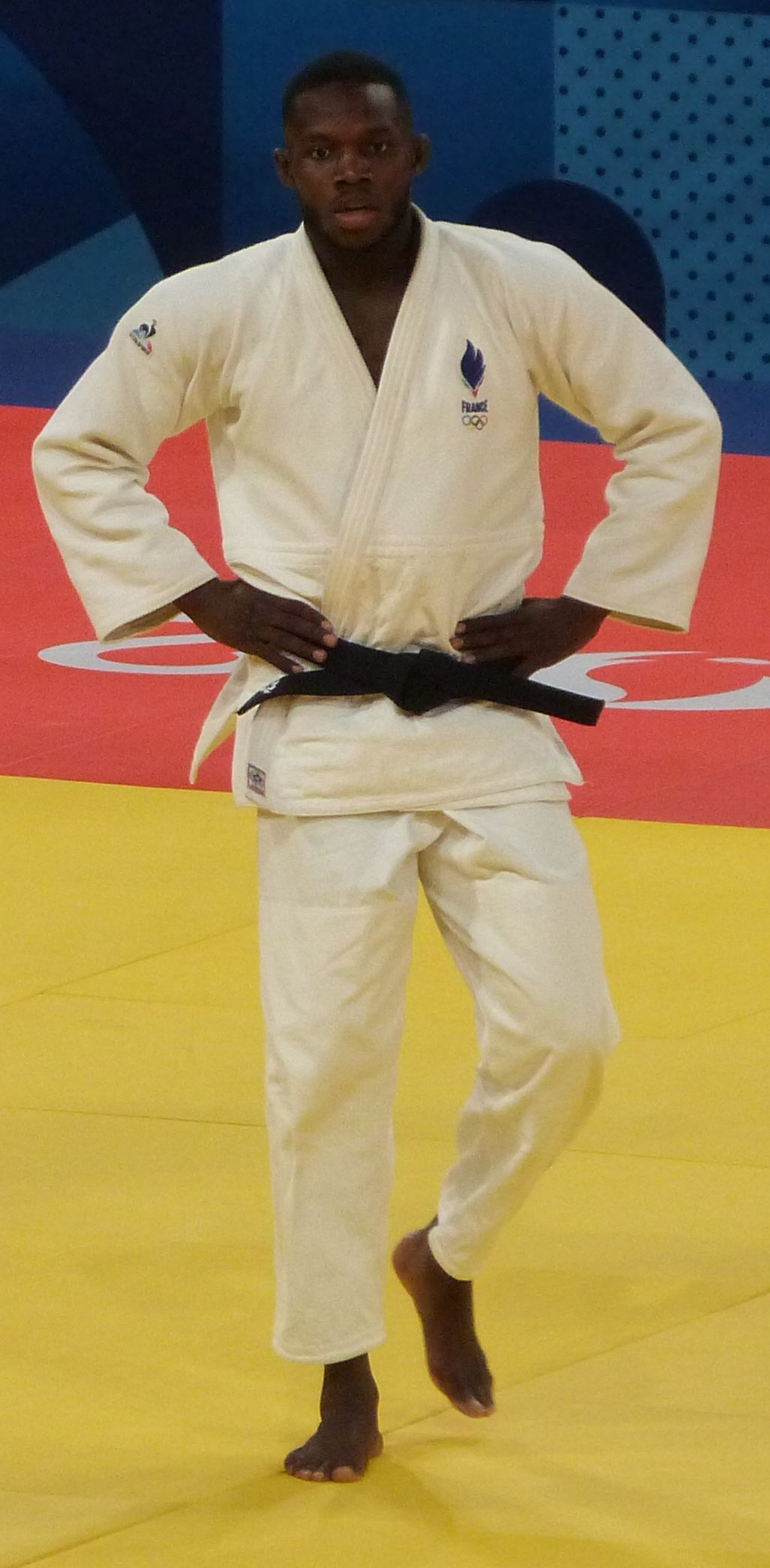
- Ngayap Hambou in 2024

Personal information
- Born: 22 June 2001 (age 25) Clichy-la-Garenne, Paris, France
- Occupation: Judoka

Sport
- Country: France
- Sport: Judo
- Weight class: ‍–‍90 kg

Achievements and titles
- Olympic Games: (bronze) (2024)
- World Champ.: 5th (2026)
- European Champ.: (silver) (2025)
Medal record
Men's judo
Representing France
Olympic Games
Gold medal – first place	2024 Paris	Mixed team
Bronze medal – third place	2024 Paris	‍–‍90 kg
World Championships
Silver medal – second place	2023 Doha	Mixed team
Silver medal – second place	2024 Abu Dhabi	Mixed team
European Championships
Silver medal – second place	2025 Podgorica	‍–‍90 kg
Bronze medal – third place	2026 Tbilisi	‍–‍90 kg
IJF Grand Slam
Silver medal – second place	2023 Astana	‍–‍90 kg
Bronze medal – third place	2022 Tbilisi	‍–‍90 kg
Bronze medal – third place	2024 Paris	‍–‍90 kg
IJF Grand Prix
Bronze medal – third place	2026 Linz	‍–‍90 kg
World Juniors Championships
Bronze medal – third place	2021 Olbia	‍–‍90 kg

Profile at external databases
- IJF: 39040
- JudoInside.com: 114239
- Updated on 8 October 2026

Maxime-Gaël Ngayap Hambou (born 22 June 2001) is a French judoka. He won a bronze medal in the men's 90 kg event at the Paris 2024 Summer Olympics as well as the gold medal in the Mixed team event as a member of the French team.

== Biography ==
Ngayap Hambou took part in the 2021 World Juniors Championships, winning a bronze medal in the 90 kg event.

At the 2023 World Championships, Ngayap Hambou won a silver medal with his team in the mixed team event after losing to Japan in the finals.

Ngayap Hambou won a silver medal at the 2023 Astana Grand Slam as well as bronze medals at the 2022 Tbilisi Grand Slam and the 2024 Paris Grand Slam.

== Honours ==
=== National honours ===
- 2024: Chevalier de la Légion d'honneur by the French government.
