= Erlan Sherov =

Kyrgyz judoka (born 1998)

Personal information
- Born: 19 June 1998 (age 28) Bishkek, Kyrgyzstan
- Occupation: Judoka

Sport
- Country: Kyrgyzstan
- Sport: Judo
- Weight class: ‍–‍90 kg

Achievements and titles
- Olympic Games: R16 (2024)
- World Champ.: (bronze) (2024)
- Asian Champ.: (gold) (2023)
Medal record
Men's judo
Representing Kyrgyzstan
World Championships
Bronze medal – third place	2024 Abu Dhabi	‍–‍90 kg
Asian Games
Gold medal – first place	2023 Hangzhou	‍–‍90 kg
Silver medal – second place	2026 Aichi‑Nagoya	‍–‍90 kg
Asian Championships
Silver medal – second place	2022 Nur‑Sultan	‍–‍90 kg
Bronze medal – third place	2024 Hong Kong	‍–‍90 kg
IJF Grand Slam
Silver medal – second place	2023 Ulaanbaatar	‍–‍90 kg
Bronze medal – third place	2024 Paris	‍–‍90 kg
Asian Junior Championships
Gold medal – first place	2018 Beirut	‍–‍81 kg
Bronze medal – third place	2017 Bishkek	‍–‍81 kg
Asian Cadet Championships
Silver medal – second place	2015 Bangkok	‍–‍81 kg

Profile at external databases
- IJF: 22257
- JudoInside.com: 98226
- Updated on 2 October 2026

Erlan Sherov (born 19 June 1998) is a judoka from Kyrgyzstan. He was a bronze medalist at the 2024 World Judo Championships.

== Career ==
Sherov won a silver medal in the 90 kg category at the 2022 Asian Championships in Nur-Sultan, Kazakhstan in August 2022.

Sherov reached the final of the 90 kg category at the 2022 Asian Games in September 2023 where he won gold with a victory against Uzbekistan's Davlat Bobonov. In doing so, he became the first judoka in the history of the Kyrgyz Republic to claim gold at the Asian Games.

Sherov won bronze in the 90 kg category at the 2024 Asian Championships in Hong Kong in April 2024.

Sherov won bronze in the 90 kg at the 2024 World Championships in Abu Dhabi in May 2024. He became the first senior Kyrgyzstan male to win a medal at the Championships, and he achieved this despite competing at the event with a rib injury. That month he rose to fourth place in the Olympic rankings for the event. He was subsequently selected for the 2024 Summer Olympics.
