= Yahor Varapayeu =

Belarusian judoka (born 1996)

Personal information
- Born: 13 December 1996 (age 29)
- Occupation: Judoka

Sport
- Country: Belarus
- Sport: Judo
- Weight class: ‍–‍90 kg

Achievements and titles
- World Champ.: R16 (2025)
- European Champ.: 5th (2017, 2018)
Medal record
Men's judo
Representing Individual Neutral Athletes
IJF Grand Slam
Gold medal – first place	2024 Astana	‍–‍90 kg
Representing Belarus
IJF Grand Slam
Silver medal – second place	2018 Ekaterinburg	‍–‍90 kg
IJF Grand Prix
Gold medal – first place	2026 Qingdao	‍–‍90 kg
Bronze medal – third place	2017 Tashkent	‍–‍90 kg
European U23 Championships
Silver medal – second place	2016 Tel Aviv	‍–‍90 kg
Silver medal – second place	2017 Podgorica	‍–‍90 kg

Profile at external databases
- IJF: 13091
- JudoInside.com: 84498
- Updated on 28 June 2026

Yahor Varapayeu (born 13 December 1996) is a Belarusian judoka.

Varapayeu is the silver medalist of the 2018 Judo Grand Slam Ekaterinburg in the ‍–‍90 kg category.
