= Judo at the 2024 Summer Olympics – Men's 90 kg =

Judo Men's 90 kg at the Games of the XXXIII Olympiad
- Venue: Grand Palais Éphémère
- Location: Paris, France
- Date: 31 July 2024
- Competitors: 29 from 29 nations
- Website: Official website

Medalists
gold medal	Lasha Bekauri (2nd title)	Georgia
silver medal	Sanshiro Murao	Japan
bronze medal	Maxime-Gaël Ngayap Hambou	France
bronze medal	Theodoros Tselidis	Greece

Competition at external databases
- Links: IJF • JudoInside

The men's 90 kg (middleweight) competition in judo at the 2024 Summer Olympics was held on 31 July 2024 at the Grand Palais Éphémère in Paris, France. The event was contested by 29 competitors from 29 nations. Lasha Bekauri of Georgia won the gold medal after defeating Sanshiro Murao of Japan in the final. Theodoros Tselidis of Greece and Maxime-Gaël Ngayap Hambou of France won the bronze medals.

== Background ==
Judo was introduced as an Olympic sport at the 1964 Summer Olympics in Tokyo, Japan. After not being included in the 1968 Summer Olympics, it returned for the 1972 edition, and has been part of the Summer Olympic programme ever since. The men's 90 kg category was one of seven weight categories in the men's judo event at the 2024 Summer Olympics.

Georgia's Lasha Bekauri was the defending Olympic champion, having won the gold medal in the same event at the 2020 Summer Olympics in Tokyo. Germany's Eduard Trippel won the silver medal, while Uzbekistan's Davlat Bobonov and Hungary's Krisztián Tóth won the bronze medals. All the medalists from the previous edition returned to compete in the 2024 edition.

During the time of the competition, Bekauri was ranked first in the men's 90 kg category in the International Judo Federation's world rankings. He was followed by Nemanja Majdov and Japan's Sanshiro Murao, who was ranked third. Bekauri had won the silver medal at the 2023 World Judo Championships in Doha, which was won by his compatriot Luka Maisuradze. Sweden's Marcus Nyman and Murao won the two bronze medals at the competition. Maisuradze did not compete in the Games as he was suspended for doping. Beakuri had also won a bronze medal at the 2022 World Judo Championships, and three gold medals at the junior categories at the World Judo Championships. Murao had previously won the 2022 Judo World Masters in Jerusalem apart from his bronze medal at the 2023 World Championships.

Azerbaijan's Eljan Hajiyev won the gold medal in the men's 90 kg category at the 2024 European Judo Championships in Zagreb. Tóth won the silver medal while Bekauri and Romania's Alex Creț won the bronze medals in the same event. Other notable competitors included Greece's Theodoros Tselidis, who had won the gold medal at the 2024 Tashkent Grand Slam in March 2024 and the bronze medal at the 2024 Tbilisi Grand Slam later that month, and France's Maxime-Gaël Ngayap Hambou, who had finished third at the 2024 Paris Grand Slam in February 2024.

== Format ==
The individual judo competition was competed as a single-elimination tournament. The competitors were divided into two halves with the winner of each match advancing to the next match. The winners of the semifinals of the two halves competed against each other for the gold and silver medals. Each judoka who loses to one of the two finalists moves into the repechage rounds, which is used to determine the bronze medals. The losers of the semifinals compete against the remaining repechage opponent from their half of the bracket in the bronze medal bout. The outcome of each match is determined by the score with points given to various techniques such as ippon, waza-ari, and yuko, and penalties.

== Schedule ==
The men's 90 kg judo event was held on 31 July 2024 at the Grand Palais Éphémère in Paris, France.

All times are Central European Summer Time (UTC+02:00)

Date	Time	Event
Wednesday, 31 July 2024	10:00	Round 1
Wednesday, 31 July 2024	10:00	Elimination round of 16
Wednesday, 31 July 2024	10:00	Quarterfinals
Wednesday, 31 July 2024	14:00	Repechage
Wednesday, 31 July 2024	14:00	Semifinals
Wednesday, 31 July 2024	14:00	Bronze medal matches
Wednesday, 31 July 2024	14:00	Final

== Summary ==
The competition featured 29 judoka representing 29 nations.

Bekauri defeated Bulgaria's Ivaylo Ivanov in the round of 16 by a waza-ari, and South Korea's Han Ju-yeop in the quarterfinals by an ippon. In the semifinals against Spain's Tristani Mosakhlishvili, the match went into golden score period as neither judoka scored a point. However, Bekauri won the match as Mosakhlishvili eventually received a third shido penalty for passivity, resulting in hansoku-make. Muraow, who was the other finalist, defeated Estonia's Klen-Kristofer Kaljulaid in the round of 16 by an ippon and the United Arab Emirates' Aram Grigorian in the quarterfinals by hansoku-make. In the semifinals, he defeated Ngayap Hambou by an ippon after he executed a throw down.

In the final, Murao initially took the lead by scoring a waza-ari. Bekauri subsequently scored two scoring moves, both were awarded as waza-ari, resulting in an ippon and a victory. Bekauri won the gold medal, to retain his Olympic title and Murao won the silver medal. Durin the final, a video review of Bekauri's decisive second waza-ari was requested by Murao's team as Murao had attempted an attack shortly before the Georgian's winning move and they sought a similar scoring decision. However, the request was not upheld and Bekauri was declared the winner.

In the first bronze-medal contest, Ngayap Hambou faced Brazil's Rafael Macedo. Both judoka received two shido penalties during the contest. However, during a later move on the ground, Macedo attempted to hold down Ngayap Hambou while applying a shime-waza technique, but caught the Frenchman's head, which was not permitted. Hence, Macedo received his third penalty for the infringement, resulting in hansoku-make and the match was awarded to Ngayap Hambou. In the other bronze-medal contest, Tselidis faced Mosakhlishvili. Tselidis scored a waza-ari with a variation of seoi-otoshi to win the contest and the bronze medal.

== Results ==
=== Finals ===
Semi-finals
Lasha Bekauri (GEO)	10
Tristani Mosakhlishvili (ESP)	00
Maxime-Gaël Ngayap Hambou (FRA)	00 (yellow card)
Sanshiro Murao (JPN)	11

Final
Lasha Bekauri (GEO)	10 (yellow card)
Sanshiro Murao (JPN)	01

=== Repechage ===
Repechage
Han Ju-yeop (KOR)	00 (yellow card)
Rafael Macedo (BRA)	11 (yellow card)
Theodoros Tselidis (GRE)	10
Aram Grigorian (UAE)	00

Bronze medal
Rafael Macedo (BRA)	00
Maxime-Gaël Ngayap Hambou (FRA)	10
Theodoros Tselidis (GRE)	01 (yellow card)
Tristani Mosakhlishvili (ESP)	00 (yellow card)

=== Pool A ===
First round
Ivaylo Ivanov (BUL)	01
Caramnob Sagaipov (LBN)	00 (yellow card)
Christian Parlati (ITA)	00 (yellow card)
John Jayne (USA)	10
Han Ju-yeop (KOR)	10 (yellow card)
Carmel Kone (BUR)	00

Round of 16
Lasha Bekauri (GEO)	01 (yellow card)
Ivaylo Ivanov (BUL)	00 (yellow card)
John Jayne (USA)	00
Han Ju-yeop (KOR)	01 (yellow card)

Quarter-finals
Lasha Bekauri (GEO)	10
Han Ju-yeop (KOR)	00 (yellow card)

=== Pool B ===
First round
Erlan Sherov (KGZ)	10 (yellow card)
Iván Felipe Silva Morales (CUB)	00
Tristani Mosakhlishvili (ESP)	01 (yellow card)
Komronshokh Ustopiriyon (TJK)	00
Krisztián Tóth (HUN)	00
Alex Creț (ROU)	10 (yellow card)
Noël van 't End (NED)	00
Rafael Macedo (BRA)	10 (yellow card)

Round of 16
Erlan Sherov (KGZ)	00 (yellow card)
Tristani Mosakhlishvili (ESP)	10 (yellow card)
Alex Creț (ROU)	00 (yellow card)
Rafael Macedo (BRA)	10

Quarter-finals
Tristani Mosakhlishvili (ESP)	01
Rafael Macedo (BRA)	00 (yellow card)

=== Pool C ===
First round
Robert Florentino (DOM)	00 (yellow card)
Theodoros Tselidis (GRE)	10
Mihael Žgank (TUR)	00
Eljan Hajiyev (AZE)	01
David Klammert (CZE)	00
Maxime-Gaël Ngayap Hambou (FRA)	10

Round of 16
Nemanja Majdov (SRB)	00
Theodoros Tselidis (GRE)	10 (yellow card)
Eljan Hajiyev (AZE)	00 (yellow card)
Maxime-Gaël Ngayap Hambou (FRA)	10

Quarter-finals
Theodoros Tselidis (GRE)	00 (yellow card)
Maxime-Gaël Ngayap Hambou (FRA)	01 (yellow card)

=== Pool D ===
First round
Rémi Feuillet (MRI)	00
Klen-Kristofer Kaljulaid (EST)	10
Davlat Bobonov (UZB)	00
Aram Grigorian (UAE)	10 (yellow card)
Eduard Trippel (GER)	00
Marcus Nyman (SWE)	01

Round of 16
Sanshiro Murao (JPN)	10
Klen-Kristofer Kaljulaid (EST)	00
Aram Grigorian (UAE)	10
Marcus Nyman (SWE)	00

Quarter-finals
Sanshiro Murao (JPN)	10
Aram Grigorian (UAE)	00
