= Nemanja Majdov =

Serbian judoka (born 1996)

Personal information
- Born: 10 August 1996 (age 30) Istočno Sarajevo, Bosnia and Herzegovina
- Home town: Istočno Sarajevo, Bosnia and Herzegovina
- Occupation: Judoka
- Height: 183 cm (6 ft 0 in)
- Website: https://nemanjamajdov.com

Sport
- Country: Serbia
- Sport: Judo
- Weight class: ‍–‍90 kg
- Club: Judo Club Red Star Belgrade
- Coached by: Ljubiša Majdov

Achievements and titles
- Olympic Games: R16 (2024)
- World Champ.: (gold) (2017)
- European Champ.: (gold) (2023)
Medal record
Men's judo
Representing Serbia
World Championships
Gold medal – first place	2017 Budapest	‍–‍90 kg
Silver medal – second place	2024 Abu Dhabi	‍–‍90 kg
Bronze medal – third place	2019 Tokyo	‍–‍90 kg
European Championships
Gold medal – first place	2023 Montpellier	‍–‍90 kg
Silver medal – second place	2018 Tel Aviv	‍–‍90 kg
Silver medal – second place	2020 Prague	‍–‍90 kg
Silver medal – second place	2026 Tbilisi	‍–‍90 kg
Bronze medal – third place	2024 Zagreb	Mixed team
World Masters
Bronze medal – third place	2019 Qingdao	‍–‍90 kg
IJF Grand Slam
Gold medal – first place	2019 Baku	‍–‍90 kg
Gold medal – first place	2023 Abu Dhabi	‍–‍90 kg
Silver medal – second place	2022 Tel Aviv	‍–‍90 kg
Silver medal – second place	2022 Baku	‍–‍90 kg
Silver medal – second place	2026 Tbilisi	‍–‍90 kg
Bronze medal – third place	2016 Abu Dhabi	‍–‍90 kg
Bronze medal – third place	2019 Brasilia	‍–‍90 kg
Bronze medal – third place	2021 Kazan	‍–‍90 kg
Bronze medal – third place	2022 Abu Dhabi	‍–‍90 kg
Bronze medal – third place	2025 Abu Dhabi	‍–‍90 kg
Bronze medal – third place	2026 Lausanne	‍–‍90 kg
IJF Grand Prix
Gold medal – first place	2019 Marrakesh	‍–‍90 kg
Silver medal – second place	2018 Antalya	‍–‍90 kg
Silver medal – second place	2019 Hohhot	‍–‍90 kg
Bronze medal – third place	2017 Cancún	‍–‍90 kg
Bronze medal – third place	2018 Zagreb	‍–‍90 kg
European U23 Championships
Bronze medal – third place	2016 Tel Aviv	‍–‍90 kg
European Junior Championships
Gold medal – first place	2014 Bucharest	‍–‍81 kg
Gold medal – first place	2016 Málaga	‍–‍81 kg
European Cadet Championships
Silver medal – second place	2013 Tallinn	‍–‍73 kg
Youth Olympic Games
Silver medal – second place	2014 Nanjing	Mixed team
Mediterranean Games
Silver medal – second place	2018 Tarragona	‍–‍90 kg

Profile at external databases
- IJF: 16206
- JudoInside.com: 74943
- Updated on 31 August 2026

Nemanja Majdov (Serbian Cyrillic: Немања Мајдов; born 10 August 1996) is a Serbian judoka.

== Biography ==
He was born in Istočno Sarajevo, Bosnia and Herzegovina. He is coached by his father Ljubiša and his older brother Stefan, who are also judokas.

Majdov won a gold medal at the 2017 World Championships in Budapest. At the 2018 European Championships in Tel Aviv, he won his first senior European medal, a silver at the ‍–‍90 kg category. At the 2019 World Championships, he won a bronze medal.

He won the silver medal in his event at the 2022 Tel Aviv Grand Slam held in Tel Aviv, Israel.

Majdov appeared on the Together We Can Do Everything ballot list for the 2022 Serbian general election, as an independent candidate.

In 2013, he won his first European Championship title.

Before the 2024 Olympic Games, he won silver at the World Championships in Abu Dhabi. On 31 August 2024 Nemanja Maidov was suspended from competitions for five months by the International Judo Federation for not bowing after the match finished as well as taking off his judogi and belt while on the tatami mat in the 2024 Summer Olympics after losing his match against Theodoros Tselidis. The cross sign although featured in the Disciplinary Commission's case, when ruling was considered "relatively discreet" and was performed in the mixed zone.

== Honours ==
- Young Athlete of The Year by the Serbian Olympic Committee: 2014
