= 2010 World Judo Championships – Women's 78 kg =

Judo competition

Judo Women's 78 kg at the 2010 World Judo Championships
- Venue: Yoyogi National Gymnasium
- Location: Tokyo, Japan
- Date: 9 September 2010
- Competitors: 32 from 22 nations

Medalists
| gold medal | Kayla Harrison (1st title) | United States |
| silver medal | Mayra Aguiar | Brazil |
| bronze medal | Akari Ogata | Japan |
| bronze medal | Yang Xiuli | China |

Competition at external databases
- Links: IJF • JudoInside

The Women's 78 kg competition at the 2010 World Judo Championships was held at 9 September at the Yoyogi National Gymnasium in Tokyo, Japan. Thirty-two competitors contested for the medals, being split in four pools where the winner advanced to the medal round.

== Pool A ==
| Quarterfinals | | Semifinals | | Final |
| (France) Céline Lebrun | 003 |
| (Netherlands) Marhinde Verkerk | 000 | (France) Céline Lebrun | 101 |
| (Australia) Stephanie Grant | 000 | (Belgium) Catherine Jacques | 001 |
| (Belgium) Catherine Jacques | 110 | | | (France) Céline Lebrun | 000 |
| (United States) Kayla Harrison | 003 | | | (United States) Kayla Harrison | 001 |
| (Germany) Luise Malzahn | 000 | (United States) Kayla Harrison | 100 |
| (Slovenia) Ana Velensek | 100 | (Slovenia) Ana Velensek | 000 |
| (United Kingdom) Scarlett Woolcock | 000 |

== Pool B ==
| Quarterfinals | | Semifinals | | Final |
| (Japan) Akari Ogata | 101 |
| (China) Zhang Zhehui | 000 | (Japan) Akari Ogata | 100 |
| (Philippines) Ruth Dugaduga | 000 | (Canada) Catherine Roberge | 000 |
| (Canada) Catherine Roberge | 100 | | | (Japan) Akari Ogata | 000 |
| (Ukraine) Maryna Pryshchepa | 101 | | | (Ukraine) Maryna Pryshchepa | 020 |
| (Russia) Flora Mkhitaryan | 000 | (Ukraine) Maryna Pryshchepa | 100 |
| (South Korea) Park Jong-Won | 101 | (South Korea) Park Jong-Won | 000 |
| (Haiti) Nadjeda Gena | 000 |

== Pool C ==
| Quarterfinals | | Semifinals | | Final |
| (Germany) Heide Wollert | 102 |
| (France) Audrey Tcheumeo | 010 | (Germany) Heide Wollert | 001 |
| (Mongolia) Lkhamdegd Purevjargal | 000 | (Hungary) Abigel Joo | 000 |
| (Hungary) Abigel Joo | 100 | | | (Germany) Heide Wollert | 021 |
| (Japan) Tomomi Okamura | 001 | | | (Russia) Vera Moskalyuk | 010 |
| (Russia) Vera Moskalyuk | 100 | (Russia) Vera Moskalyuk | 110 |
| (Ukraine) Anastasiia Matrosova | 101 | (Ukraine) Anastasiia Matrosova | 000 |
| (United Kingdom) Gemma Gibbons | 000 |

== Pool D ==
| Quarterfinals | | Semifinals | | Final |
| (China) Yang Xiuli | 101 |
| (Canada) Amy Cotton | 000 | (China) Yang Xiuli | 020 |
| (Poland) Daria Pogorzelec | 001 | (Portugal) Yahima Ramirez | 000 |
| (Portugal) Yahima Ramirez | 011 | | | (China) Yang Xiuli | 000 |
| (South Korea) Jeong Gyeong-Mi | 001 | | | (Brazil) Mayra Aguiar | 100 |
| (Brazil) Mayra Aguiar | 002 | (Brazil) Mayra Aguiar | 100 |
| (Cuba) Yalennis Castillo | 101 | (Cuba) Yalennis Castillo | 000 |
| (United States) Suzanne Rizek | 000 |

== Repechage ==
| Repechage | | Third place |
| (France) Celine Lebrun | 001 |
| (Japan) Akari Ogata | 100 | (Japan) Akari Ogata | 110 |
| | | (Germany) Heide Wollert | 000 |

| Repechage | | Third place |
| (Russia) Vera Moskalyuk | 000 |
| (China) Yang Xiuli | 020 | (China) Yang Xiuli | 100 |
| | | (Ukraine) Maryna Pryshchepa | 000 |

== Finals ==
Semi-finals
(United States) Kayla Harrison | 102
(Ukraine) Maryna Pryshchepa | 000
(Germany) Heide Wollert | 000
(Brazil) Mayra Aguiar | 100

Final
(United States) Kayla Harrison | 001
(Brazil) Mayra Aguiar | 000
