= 2011 World Judo Championships – Women's 78 kg =

Judo competition

Judo Women's 78 kg at the 2011 World Judo Championships
- Venue: Accor Arena
- Location: Paris, France
- Date: 26 August 2011
- Competitors: 40 from 31 nations

Medalists
gold medal	Audrey Tcheuméo (1st title)	France
silver medal	Akari Ogata	Japan
bronze medal	Kayla Harrison	United States
bronze medal	Mayra Aguiar	Brazil

Competition at external databases
- Links: IJF • JudoInside

The women's 78 kg competition of the 2011 World Judo Championships was held on August 26. it was won by the French athlete Audrey Tcheuméo.

== Medalists ==
Gold	Silver	Bronze
Audrey Tcheuméo (FRA)	Akari Ogata (JPN)	Kayla Harrison (USA); Mayra Aguiar (BRA)

== Results ==
=== Pool A ===
First Round
(Japan) Akari Ogata	110
(Cuba) Kaliema Antomarchi	000
(China) Zhang Meiling	100
(Kazakhstan) Zamzagul Faizollanova	000

Quarterfinals
(Japan) Akari Ogata	100
(Haiti) Nadjeda Gena	000
(Canada) Amy Cotton	110
(Venezuela) Keivi Pinto	000
(Netherlands) Marhinde Verkerk	111
(Kyrgyzstan) Dinara Kakharova	000
(Ukraine) Maryna Pryshchepa	100
(China) Zhang Meiling	000

Semifinals
(Japan) Akari Ogata	001
(Canada) Amy Cotton	000
(Netherlands) Marhinde Verkerk	110
(Ukraine) Maryna Pryshchepa	000

Final
(Japan) Akari Ogata	100
(Netherlands) Marhinde Verkerk	000

=== Pool B ===
First Round
(Germany) Luise Malzahn	001
(Poland) Daria Pogorzelec	000
(Hungary) Abigel Joo	102
(Italy) Assunta Galeone	010

Quarterfinals
(Brazil) Mayra Aguiar	101
(Cameroon) Vanessa Atangana	000
(Gabon) Audrey Adjani	000
(Germany) Luise Malzahn	101
(Hungary) Abigel Joo	112
(Fiji) Sisilia Nasiga	000
(Russia) Vera Moskalyuk	001
(Belgium) Catherine Jacques	000

Semifinals
(Brazil) Mayra Aguiar	101
(Germany) Luise Malzahn	000
(Hungary) Abigel Joo	110
(Russia) Vera Moskalyuk	001

Final
(Brazil) Mayra Aguiar	100
(Hungary) Abigel Joo	000

=== Pool C ===
First Round
(Ukraine) Anastasiia Matrosova	000
(Mongolia) Pürevjargalyn Lkhamdegd	100
(Cuba) Yalennis Castillo	101
(Spain) Raquel Prieto	000

Quarterfinals
(United States) Kayla Harrison	001
(Canada) Catherine Roberge	000
(Russia) Anastasiya Dmitrieva	000
(Mongolia) Pürevjargalyn Lkhamdegd	010
(France) Lucie Louette	001
(Cuba) Yalennis Castillo	001
(Japan) Hitomi Ikeda	101
(Colombia) Anny Cortes	000

Semifinals
(United States) Kayla Harrison	101
(Mongolia) Pürevjargalyn Lkhamdegd	000
(France) Lucie Louette	001
(Japan) Hitomi Ikeda	010

Final
(United States) Kayla Harrison	010
(Japan) Hitomi Ikeda	000

=== Pool D ===
First Round
(Lithuania) Giedre Sileikaite	000
(Kazakhstan) Galiya Ulmentayeva	001
(Slovenia) Anamari Velensek	101
(India) Jina Devi Chongtham	000

Quarterfinals
(France) Audrey Tcheuméo	001
(South Korea) Jeong Gyeong-Mi	000
(Kazakhstan) Galiya Ulmentayeva	000
(China) Zhang Zhehui	100
(Germany) Heide Wollert	001
(Senegal) Georgette Sagna	000
(Slovenia) Anamari Velensek	001
(Portugal) Yahima Ramirez	000

Semifinals
(France) Audrey Tcheuméo	011
(China) Zhang Zhehui	000
(Germany) Heide Wollert	010
(Slovenia) Anamari Velensek	000

Final
(France) Audrey Tcheuméo	100
(Germany) Heide Wollert	000

=== Repechage ===
Repechage		Third place
(Netherlands) Marhinde Verkerk	001
(Hungary) Abigel Joo	000	(Netherlands) Marhinde Verkerk	000
		(United States) Kayla Harrison	001

Repechage		Third place
(Japan) Hitomi Ikeda	000
(Germany) Heide Wollert	100	(Germany) Heide Wollert	000
		(Brazil) Mayra Aguiar	100

=== Finals ===
Semi-finals
(Japan) Akari Ogata	100
(Brazil) Mayra Aguiar	000
(United States) Kayla Harrison	000
(France) Audrey Tcheuméo	001

Final
(Japan) Akari Ogata	000
(France) Audrey Tcheuméo	100
