= Jerôme Mvondo =

Cameroonian journalist and politician (1936–2022)

Director-General of Sodecao
- In office 2006–2018

Director-General of the Société de presse et d'éditions du Cameroun
- In office 1999–2002
- Preceded by: Paul Celestin Ndembiyembe Bakoume
- Succeeded by: Marie-Claire Nnana

Personal details
- Born: 1936
- Died: 15 December 2022 (aged 85–86)
- Occupation: Journalist

Jerôme Mvondo (1936 – 15 December 2022) was a Cameroonian journalist and politician.

== Biography ==
Mvondo was originally from Bikok in the Centre Region of Cameroon. In 1999, he became director-general of the Société de presse et d'éditions du Cameroun, the group which published the Cameroon Tribune. In 2002, he was replaced by Marie-Claire Nnana.

Jerôme Mvondo died on 15 December 2022.
