= Kayla Harrison =

American Olympic judoka and mixed martial artist (born 1990)

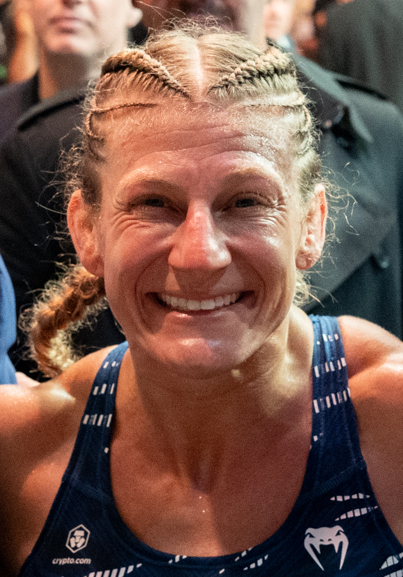
- Harrison in 2025
- Born: Kayla Jean Harrison; July 2, 1990 (age 36); Middletown, Ohio, U.S.
- Height: 5 ft 8 in (173 cm)
- Weight: 135 lb (61 kg; 9 st 9 lb)
- Division: Bantamweight (2024–present); Featherweight (2020, 2023); Lightweight (2018–2022); 78 kg (Judo)
- Reach: 66 in (168 cm)
- Style: Judo
- Fighting out of: Coconut Creek, Florida, U.S.
- Team: American Top Team (2018–present)
- Trainer: Jimmy Pedro
- Rank: 6th dan black belt in Judo under Jimmy Pedro
- Years active: 2003–2016 (Judo); 2018–present (MMA)

Mixed martial arts record
- Total: 21
- Wins: 20
- By knockout: 6
- By submission: 9
- By decision: 5
- Losses: 1
- By decision: 1

Other information
- Children: 2
- Notable clubs: NYAC; USA Judo National Team FORCE
- Website: kaylaharrison.com
- Mixed martial arts record from Sherdog
- Judo career
- Rank: 6th dan black belt

Judo achievements and titles
- Olympic Games: (gold) (2012, 2016)
- World Champ.: (gold) (2010)
- Pan American Champ.: (gold) (2011, 2016)
- Highest world ranking: 1
Medal record
Women's judo
Representing United States
Olympic Games
Gold medal – first place	2012 London	‍–‍78 kg
Gold medal – first place	2016 Rio de Janeiro	‍–‍78 kg
World Championships
Gold medal – first place	2010 Tokyo	‍–‍78 kg
Bronze medal – third place	2011 Paris	‍–‍78 kg
Bronze medal – third place	2014 Chelyabinsk	‍–‍78 kg
Pan American Games
Gold medal – first place	2011 Guadalajara	‍–‍78 kg
Gold medal – first place	2015 Toronto	‍–‍78 kg
Pan American Championships
Gold medal – first place	2011 Guadalajara	‍–‍78 kg
Gold medal – first place	2016 Havana	‍–‍78 kg
Silver medal – second place	2015 Edmonton	‍–‍78 kg
Bronze medal – third place	2010 San Salvador	‍–‍78 kg
Bronze medal – third place	2013 San José	‍–‍70 kg
World Masters
Gold medal – first place	2015 Rabat	‍–‍78 kg
Gold medal – first place	2016 Guadalajara	‍–‍78 kg
IJF Grand Slam
Gold medal – first place	2012 Rio de Janeiro	‍–‍78 kg
Gold medal – first place	2014 Tokyo	‍–‍78 kg
Gold medal – first place	2015 Tokyo	‍–‍78 kg
Silver medal – second place	2011 Rio de Janeiro	‍–‍78 kg
Silver medal – second place	2011 Tokyo	‍–‍78 kg
Silver medal – second place	2012 Paris	‍–‍78 kg
Silver medal – second place	2014 Tyumen	‍–‍78 kg
Silver medal – second place	2016 Paris	‍–‍78 kg
Bronze medal – third place	2015 Baku	‍–‍78 kg
IJF Grand Prix
Gold medal – first place	2010 Abu Dhabi	‍–‍78 kg
Gold medal – first place	2011 Qingdao	‍–‍78 kg
Gold medal – first place	2012 Düsseldorf	‍–‍78 kg
Gold medal – first place	2014 Havana	‍–‍78 kg
Gold medal – first place	2015 Düsseldorf	‍–‍78 kg
Gold medal – first place	2015 Tbilisi	‍–‍78 kg
Gold medal – first place	2015 Budapest	‍–‍78 kg
Gold medal – first place	2016 Budapest	‍–‍78 kg
Silver medal – second place	2015 Jeju	‍–‍78 kg
Bronze medal – third place	2010 Düsseldorf	‍–‍78 kg
Bronze medal – third place	2010 Rotterdam	‍–‍78 kg
Bronze medal – third place	2014 Jeju	‍–‍78 kg
Bronze medal – third place	2015 Qingdao	‍–‍78 kg
Bronze medal – third place	2016 Havana	‍–‍78 kg
World Juniors Championships
Gold medal – first place	2008 Bangkok	‍–‍78 kg
Silver medal – second place	2009 Paris	‍–‍78 kg

Profile at external judo databases
- IJF: 54
- JudoInside.com: 34028

Kayla Jean Harrison (born July 2, 1990) is an American professional mixed martial artist and former judoka. She currently competes in the women's Bantamweight division of the Ultimate Fighting Championship (UFC), where she is the current UFC Women's Bantamweight Champion. She is the first female fighter (Note: The first fighter to achieve the feat was Henry Cejudo, who was a gold medalist at the 2008 Beijing Olympics and years later was UFC Flyweight Champion and UFC Bantamweight Champion.) to win an Olympic gold medal and a UFC championship. She is also a former two-time Professional Fighters League lightweight champion. As of November 17, 2026, she is #1 in the UFC women's pound-for-pound rankings. Harrison is considered the greatest American judoka of all time and one of the greatest female mixed martial artists in history.

In judo, Harrison won the women’s 78 kg gold medal in the 2010 World Judo Championships and gold medals at the 2012 and 2016 Summer Olympics. She remains the only American judoka to have won a gold medal in Judo at the Summer Olympics and one of a rare few to have won a gold medal in the World Judo Championships. In 2016, she was promoted to Rokudan (6th-degree black belt) by the United States Judo Association, becoming the youngest ever to achieve the rank.

After making her MMA debut in 2018, Harrison won the PFL Lightweight World Tournament in 2019 and successfully repeated as champion in 2021. She signed with the UFC in January 2024, defeating former champion Holly Holm in her promotional debut. In June 2025, she captured the UFC Bantamweight Championship via second-round kimura submission of Julianna Peña before successfully defending it against former two-division champion Amanda Nunes via fourth-round rear-naked choke submission at UFC 334.

Harrison was inducted into the Martial Arts History Museum Hall of Fame in 2012, the United States Judo Federation Hall of Fame in 2015, and the International Sports Hall of Fame in March 2023.

== Early life ==
Harrison was born on July 2, 1990, in Middletown, Ohio, to Kenny Harrison and Jeannie Yazell. She took up judo at the age of six, having been introduced to the sport by her mother, who was a black belt. Harrison graduated from Middletown High School (Ohio).

She began training under coach Daniel Doyle, and won two national championships by the age of 15. During that period, Doyle was sexually abusing Harrison, who reported it to another judoka, who in turn told Harrison's mother. She subsequently reported this to the police. Doyle was convicted and sentenced to a ten-year prison term. A month after the abuse was revealed, she moved away from her home in Ohio to Boston to train with Jimmy Pedro and his father. Harrison later wrote a book titled Fighting Back and founded the Fearless Foundation, an organization dedicated to empowering survivors of abuse to "find their mastery."

== Career ==
=== Judo ===
Harrison changed weight classes in 2008, from the ‍–‍63 kg division to the ‍–‍78 kg division. She could not compete in the 2008 Summer Olympics as the United States had not qualified in that division. She won the 2008 Junior World Championship that year, and the following year placed second, becoming the first American to compete in two Junior World Championships finals.

Harrison won the gold medal in the ‍–‍78 kg category at the 2010 World Championships, the first American to do so since 1999 (when her coach, Jimmy Pedro, did so in Birmingham, United Kingdom). At the 2011 World Championships in Paris, she placed third taking the bronze medal. Harrison had lost to the eventual winner, Audrey Tcheuméo of France, in her semi-final.

Harrison celebrates at 2016 Summer Olympics, where she won her second Olympic gold medal in judo

Prior to the 2012 Summer Olympics in London, Harrison was injured during training, having torn a medial collateral ligament. On August 2, 2012, she won the Olympic title in the ‍–‍78 kg category, defeating Gemma Gibbons of Britain by two yukos, to become the first American to win an Olympic gold medal in judo. She earned a second Olympic gold medal in the same weight class in 2016 in Rio, defeating Audrey Tcheuméo of France.

In 2015, Harrison was elected to the United States Judo Federation Hall Of Fame and on August 31, 2016, following her second Olympic gold medal, the United States Judo Association promoted Harrison to rokudan (6th Degree Black Belt) making her the youngest person in the US to ever be awarded this rank.

=== Mixed martial arts ===
Harrison, a former training partner of fellow judoka Ronda Rousey, announced in October 2016 that she had signed with World Series of Fighting. While she would initially work as a commentator she also indicated she was contracted to fight, in the women's 145 pounds (66 kg) division.

==== PFL season 2018 ====
Harrison made her MMA debut at PFL 2 on June 21, 2018, against Brittney Elkin in the Women's Lightweight division. She won via submission due to an armbar in the first round.

For her second professional fight, Harrison faced Jozette Cotton at PFL 6 on August 16, 2018. She won the fight via TKO in the third round.

Harrison was on the main card for PFL 11 in 2018 and defeated Moriel Charneski via first-round TKO; after her victory, it appeared that she was not completely content with her own performance.

==== PFL season 2019 ====
Harrison was expected to headline the first event of PFL's second season against Svetlana Khautova on May 9, 2019. Khautova withdrew from the bout and was replaced by Larissa Pacheco. Harrison won the fight by unanimous decision.

Harrison faced Morgan Frier in the co-main event of PFL 4 on July 11, 2019. She won the fight by key lock submission in the first round. Subsequently, Harrison signed a new long-term contract extension with the PFL.

After becoming second in the preliminary round standing, Harrison secured a position at the playoffs. She was originally scheduled to face number 3 ranked Genah Fabian at PFL 7 on October 11, 2019, but Fabian was forced to pull out of the bout. Fabian was replaced by number 5 Bobbi Jo Dalziel. Harrison would win the fight by an armbar in the first round.

Harrison faced Larissa Pacheco in rematch for the Women's Lightweight final at PFL 10 on December 31, 2019. After dominating every round with her superior grappling, Harrison won the fight by unanimous decision to win the 2019 Women's Lightweight Championship.

==== PFL season 2020 ====
Harrison was expected to compete in the season 2020 of PFL, but the complete season was cancelled due to the COVID-19 pandemic.

==== Other promotions ====
With the 2020 PFL season cancelled, Harrison was handed a contract exemption to sign with the Invicta FC and made her debut in the Featherweight division against Courtney King at Invicta FC 43 on November 20, 2020. She won the fight via TKO in the second round.

Harrison was then expected to compete for Titan FC. She was scheduled to face Jozette Cotton in a rematch on December 17, 2020, at Titan FC 66. The day before the fight, Cotton was hospitalized due to a bad weight cut and the bout was cancelled.

==== PFL season 2021 ====
Kayla faced Mariana Morais on May 6, 2021, at PFL 3 for the start of the 2021 season. She won the bout via TKO in the first round.

Kayla faced Cindy Dandois on June 25, 2021, at PFL 6. She won the bout in the first round via an arm bar submission.

Kayla faced Genah Fabian in the Semifinals of the Women's Lightweight tournament on August 19, 2021, at PFL 8. She won the bout in the first round via TKO by way of ground and pound.

Kayla faced Taylor Guardado in the Finals of the Women's Lightweight tournament on October 27, 2021, at PFL 10. She won the bout via armbar in the second round.

==== PFL season 2022 ====
Being one of the most sought-after free agents in the sport, Harrison ended up signing a contract with Bellator MMA in March 2022. However, PFL exercised their matching right, and Harrison re-signed – a deal set to be terminated in December 2023 – with them.

Harrison faced Marina Mokhnatkina on May 6, 2022, at PFL 3. She won the bout via unanimous decision.

Harrison was scheduled to face Julia Budd on July 1, 2022, at PFL 6. However, a week before the event, Budd pulled out due to injury and was replaced by Kaitlin Young. Harrison won the bout, with the referee stoppage at the 2:35 mark of the first round.

Harrison faced Martina Jindrová in the Semifinals off the Women's Lightweight tournament on August 20, 2022, at PFL 9. She won the bout in the first round via arm-triangle choke.

Harrison faced Larissa Pacheco for a third time in the finals of the Women's Lightweight tournament on November 25, 2022, at PFL 10. In an upset, she lost the fight via unanimous decision.

==== PFL season 2023 ====
After a year hiatus, Harrison was scheduled to face Julia Budd at PFL 10 on November 24, 2023. However, Budd was removed from the fight that she "refused to fulfill her contractual obligation" and was replaced by Aspen Ladd at a catchweight of 150 pounds. Harrison won the fight by unanimous decision.

=== Ultimate Fighting Championship ===
On January 23, 2024, Dana White announced that the UFC had signed Harrison and that she would make her promotional debut, as well as her bantamweight debut, against former UFC Women's Bantamweight Champion Holly Holm on April 13, 2024, at UFC 300. Harrison won the fight against Holm by a rear-naked choke submission in the second round.

Harrison faced Ketlen Vieira on October 5, 2024 at UFC 307. She won the fight by unanimous decision.

==== UFC Bantamweight Champion ====
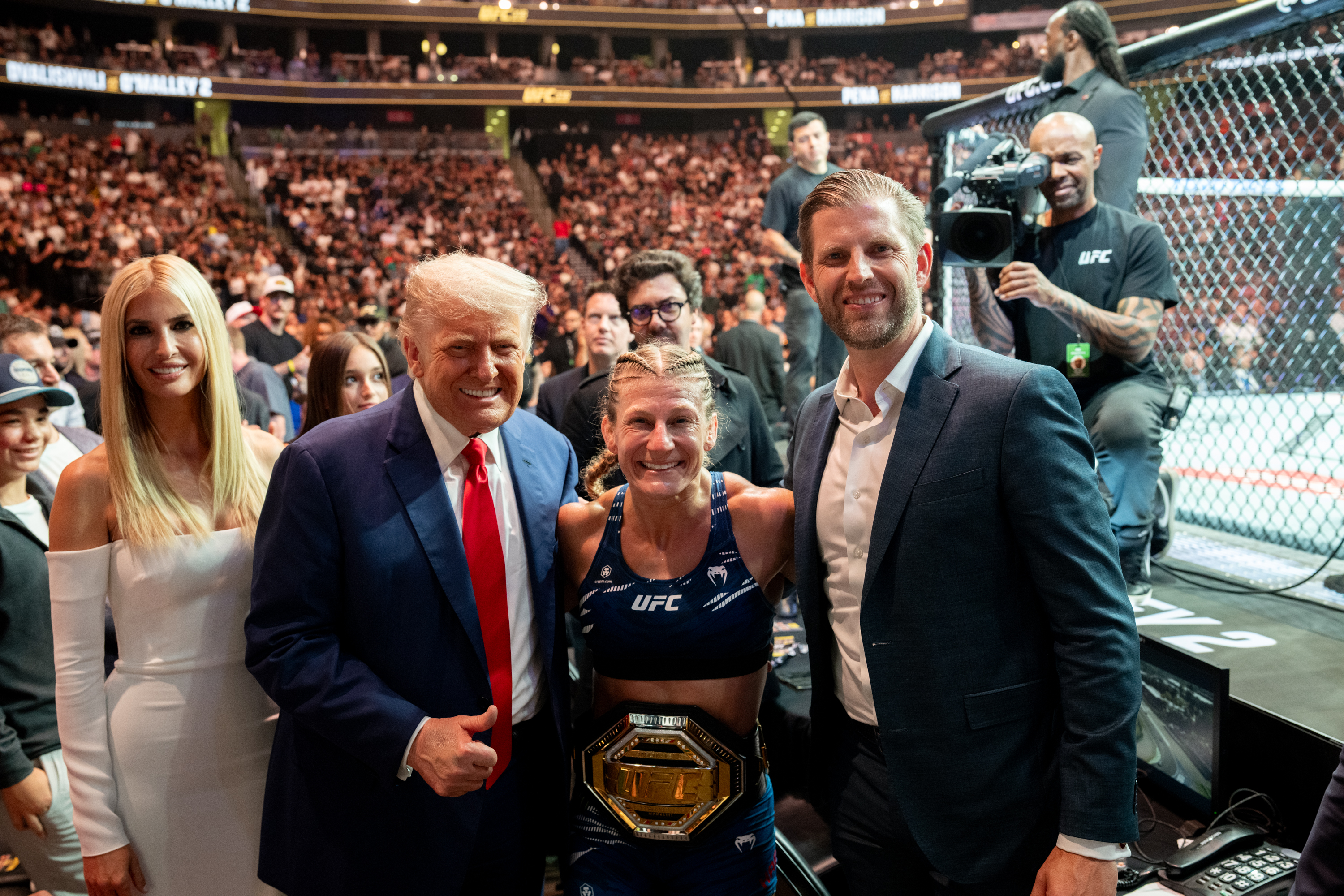
Harrison (middle) with President Donald Trump following her Championship victory at UFC 316

Harrison competed for the UFC Women's Bantamweight Championship against two-time champion (also The Ultimate Fighter 18 Tournament Winner) Julianna Peña on June 7, 2025 at UFC 316. She won the championship via kimura at the end of the second round. This fight earned her a Performance of the Night award. Immediately following the victory, Amanda Nunes entered the octagon to face-off with Harrison.

Harrison was scheduled to defend her title against former two-time champion Amanda Nunes on January 24, 2026 at UFC 324. However, Harrison withdrew from the bout after being diagnosed with herniated discs in her neck, which required surgery. The bout was reportedly linked to September 19, 2026 at UFC 331 but was once again postponed. The bout ended up taking place on November 14, 2026 at UFC 334. Harrison won the fight via a rear-naked choke submission in the fourth round. This fight earned her a $100,000 Performance of the Night award.

== Training ==
=== Judo ===
Coached by Jimmy Pedro, Harrison maintained a rigorous training regimen, practicing judo daily while working with a strength and conditioning coach three to five days per week. She also incorporated sprinting and interval training three to five times a week, alongside Olympic-style weightlifting and circuit training. Her training priorities varied depending on her competition schedule, with an emphasis on building strength during periods away from competition before shifting her focus to conditioning and achieving peak physical fitness in preparation for tournaments.

=== Mixed martial arts ===
Training at American Top Team in Coconut Creek, Florida, Harrison typically trains three times a day, five days a week, with an additional strength training session on Saturdays. Her strength training regimen includes exercises such as power cleans, front squats, and push jerks, alongside circuit-based workouts featuring rope climbs, sled pushes, and medicine ball exercises. Her training also incorporates grappling, sparring, and various drills.

=== Weight cutting ===
Having previously competed at 78 kilograms (172 lb) in judo as recently as 2016 and at 155 lb in the Professional Fighters League (PFL) in 2022, Harrison was required to cut down to 135 lb to compete in the Ultimate Fighting Championship (UFC). In preparation for her UFC bouts, she begins a strict diet and training regimen 15 weeks before the event. Starting 14 weeks out, she walks six miles daily, increasing to eight miles on Sundays, while also cycling for two hours or swimming for 90 minutes in addition to her two regular daily training sessions. Six weeks before each bout, she begins incorporating hour-long sauna sessions three times per week.

== Television appearances ==
In 2016, Harrison appeared alongside her grandmother as a contestant on the second episode of the seventh season of the HGTV series Flea Market Flip, competing against two-time Olympic figure skating medalist Nancy Kerrigan and her son. The following year, Harrison appeared on the truTV series Impractical Jokers in the season six episode "The Party Crasher", participating in James "Murr" Murray's punishment. Murray was tasked with repeatedly attempting to grapple Harrison at a party, with Harrison ultimately throwing him into a swimming pool. Harrison returned to the series in 2018, appearing as a special guest judge in "The Joker Games".

== Personal life ==
Harrison's biological father died by suicide in 2014, when she was 23 years old. Her mother, Jeannie Yazell, remarried Bob Nichols, who helped raise the two children of Harrison's sister Aura, whose struggles with drug addiction left her unable to care for them. After Jeannie suffered a stroke in 2019, Harrison decided to take on the responsibility of raising her niece Kyla and nephew Emery, eventually acquiring full custody following Bob's sudden death on May 19, 2020. She legally adopted both children in 2021.

== Championships and accomplishments ==
=== Hall of Fame ===
- Martial Arts History Museum Hall of Fame – Class of 2012
- New York Athletic Club Hall of Fame – Class of 2013
- Middletown High School Athletic Hall of Fame – Class of 2013
- United States Judo Federation Hall of Fame – Class of 2015
- Ohio Judo Hall of Fame – Class of 2020
- International Sports Hall of Fame – Class of 2023

=== Other ===
- Women's Sports Foundation
  - 2012 Wilma Rudolph Courage Award
- Glamour Women of the Year Awards
  - 2012 The "Unstoppables" Award

=== Judo ===
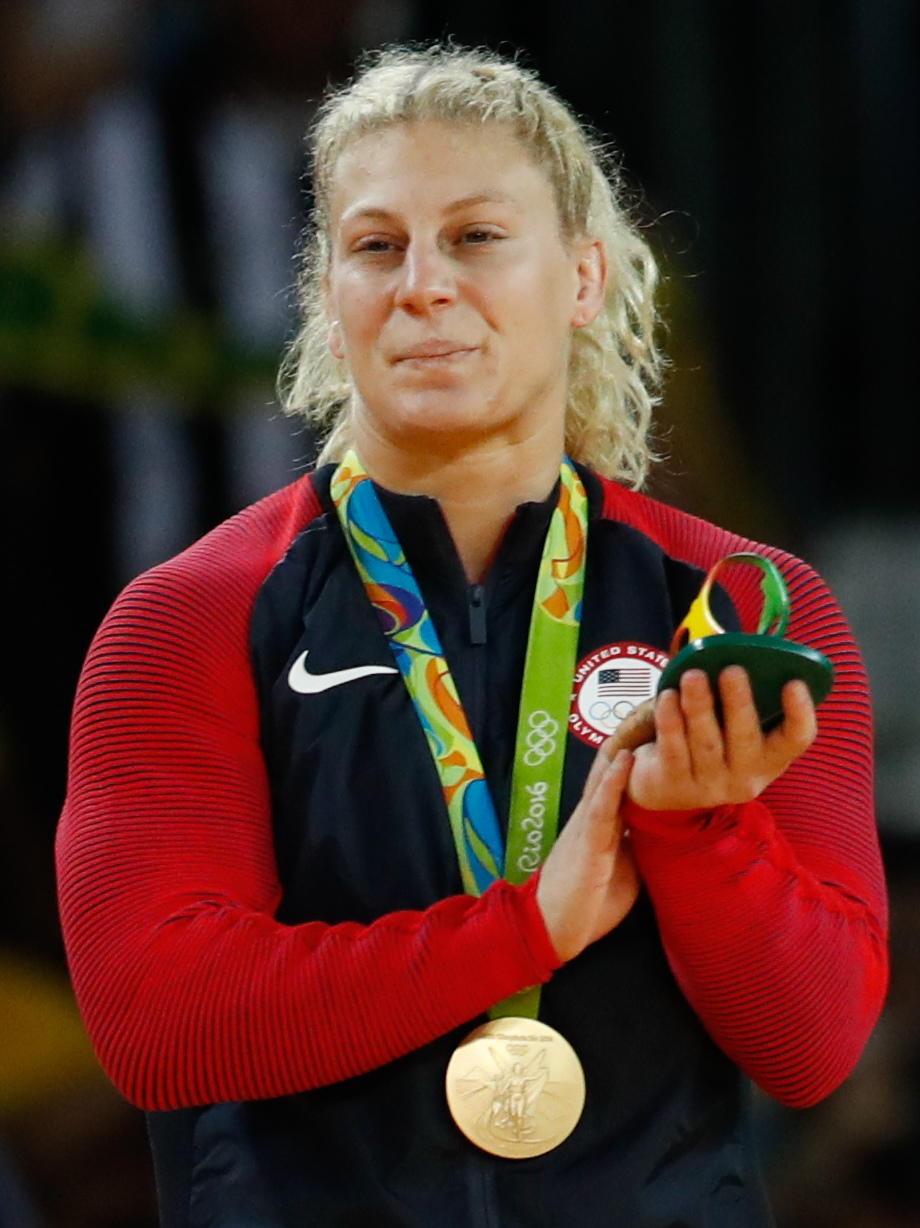
Harrison with her second Olympic gold medal after winning the women's 78 kg judo event at the 2016 Summer Olympics

- U.S. Olympic Committee
  - 2012 O.C. Tanner Inspiration Award
- Olympic Games
  - (gold) 2012 London
  - (gold) 2016 Rio de Janeiro
- U.S. Olympic Trials
  - (gold) 2008 Las Vegas
- World Championships
  - (gold) 2010 Tokyo
  - (bronze) 2011 Paris
  - (bronze) 2014 Chelyabinsk
- Pan American Games
  - (gold) 2011 Guadalajara
  - (gold) 2015 Toronto
- Pan American Championships
  - (bronze) 2010 San Salvador
  - (gold) 2011 Guadalajara
  - (bronze) 2013 San José
  - (silver) 2015 Edmonton
  - (gold) 2016 Havana
- World Masters
  - (gold) 2015 Rabat
  - (gold) 2016 Guadalajara
- IJF Grand Slam
  - (silver) 2011 Rio de Janeiro
  - (silver) 2011 Tokyo
  - (silver) 2012 Paris
  - (gold) 2012 Rio de Janeiro
  - (silver) 2014 Tyumen
  - (gold) 2014 Tokyo
  - (bronze) 2015 Baku
  - (gold) 2015 Tokyo
  - (silver) 2016 Paris
- IJF Grand Prix
  - (bronze) 2010 Düsseldorf
  - (bronze) 2010 Rotterdam
  - (gold) 2010 Abu Dhabi
  - (gold) 2011 Qingdao
  - (gold) 2012 Düsseldorf
  - (gold) 2014 Havana
  - (bronze) 2014 Jeju
  - (gold) 2015 Düsseldorf
  - (gold) 2015 Tbilisi
  - (gold) 2015 Budapest
  - (bronze) 2015 Qingdao
  - (silver) 2015 Jeju
  - (bronze) 2016 Havana
  - (gold) 2016 Budapest
- World Cup
  - (bronze) 2009 Belo Horizonte
  - (bronze) 2010 Warsaw
  - (gold) 2010 Belo Horizonte
  - (gold) 2010 Isla de Margarita
  - (gold) 2010 San Salvador
  - (gold) 2010 Miami
  - (silver) 2010 Tashkent
  - (gold) 2010 Birmingham
  - (gold) 2011 Miami
  - (silver) 2011 Puerto La Cruz
  - (gold) 2012 Budapest
  - (gold) 2012 Miami
- Pan American Open
  - (silver) 2013 Montevideo
  - (gold) 2013 Buenos Aires
  - (silver) 2014 San Salvador
  - (gold) 2014 Miami
- European Cup
  - (gold) 2012 Prague
- World Juniors Championships
  - (gold) 2008 Bangkok
  - (silver) 2009 Paris
- U.S. Open
  - (bronze) 2005 Fort Lauderdale
  - (silver) 2006 Miami (70 kg)
  - (gold) 2006 Miami (Openweight)
  - (gold) 2007 Duluth
  - (gold) 2008 Colorado Springs (78 kg)
  - (gold) 2008 Colorado Springs (Openweight)
  - (gold) 2009 San Jose
  - (gold) 2010 Miami
- Dallas Invitational Open
  - (gold) 2003 Dallas
- Liberty Bell Judo Classic
  - (bronze) 2005 Philadelphia
- Pedro's Judo Challenge
  - (gold) 2007 Wakefield
- Puerto Rico Open
  - (gold) 2007 Puerto Rico
- USA Fall Classic
  - (gold) 2007 Coral Springs
  - (gold) 2008 Spokane
- Rendez-Vous Canada
  - (bronze) 2007 Montreal
- Kracup Korea Open
  - (silver) 2008 Jeju
- U.S. National Championships
  - (bronze) 2005 Virginia Beach
  - (gold) 2006 Houston
  - (silver) 2007 Miami
  - (gold) 2008 Virginia Beach
  - (gold) 2009 San Diego (78 kg)
  - (gold) 2009 San Diego (Openweight)
  - (gold) 2010 Myrtle Beach
  - (gold) 2011 Orlando
  - (gold) 2013 Orlando
  - (gold) 2016 Dallas
- U.S. Junior National Championships
  - USJA Juvenile C Championships
    - (gold) 2004 Rosemont
    - (gold) 2005 Toledo
  - USJA Winter Championships
    - (gold) 2007 Ontario
  - USJA IJF Junior Championships
    - (gold) 2007 Indianapolis
  - USJF IJF Junior Championships
    - (gold) 2007 Ypsilanti
  - U.S. U20 Championships
    - (gold) 2009 Lake Buena Vista
- U.S. National Junior Olympics
  - (gold) 2005 Gwinnett County
  - (gold) 2008 Kissimmee
- Belgian Ladies U20 Open
  - (gold) 2007 Arlon
- Junior U.S. Open
  - (bronze) 2003 Boca Raton
  - (bronze) 2004 Fort Lauderdale
  - (gold) 2005 Fort Lauderdale
  - (gold) 2006 Fort Lauderdale (70 kg)
  - (gold) 2006 Fort Lauderdale (Openweight)
- British Junior Open
  - (bronze) 2004 London
  - (bronze) 2005 London
- Ohio Judo
  - 2003 Outstanding Junior
- Black Belt magazine
  - 2012 Special Achievement Award
  - 2017 Woman of the Year

=== Mixed martial arts ===
- Professional Fighters League
  - 2019 PFL Women's Lightweight Championship
    - First female to win a PFL title
  - 2021 PFL Women's Lightweight Championship
    - First female two-time PFL champion
- Ultimate Fighting Championship
  - UFC Women's Bantamweight Championship (One time, Current)
    - One successful title defense
  - Performance of the Night (Two times) vs. Julianna Peña and Amanda Nunes
  - Tied (Ronda Rousey) for second most submissions in UFC Women's Bantamweight division history (3) (behind Beatriz Mesquita)
  - Holds wins over three former UFC champions — vs. Holly Holm, Julianna Peña and Amanda Nunes
  - UFC Honors Awards
    - 2024: Fan's Choice Submission of the Year Nominee vs. Holly Holm & Fan's Choice Debut of the Year Nominee vs. Holly Holm
    - 2025: Fan's Choice Submission of the Year Nominee vs. Julianna Peña
  - UFC.com Awards
    - 2024: Best Newcomer of the 1HY, Ranked #3 Submission of the Year vs. Holly Holm & Ranked #2 Newcomer of the Year
    - 2025: Ranked #3 Submission of the Year vs. Julianna Peña
- Sports Illustrated
  - 2025 Top 50 Most Influential Figures in Sports
- World MMA Awards
  - 2020 Nomination – Female Fighter of the Year
  - 2024 Nomination – Female Fighter of the Year
  - July 1, 2024 – December 31, 2025 World MMA Female Fighter of the Year
- ESPY Awards
  - 2022 Nomination – Best MMA Fighter ESPY Award
  - 2025 Nomination – Best MMA Fighter ESPY Award
- ESPN
  - 2024 Female Fighter of the Year
  - 2025 Female Fighter of the Mid-Year
- BodySlam.net
  - 2024 Female Fighter of the Year
- Good Guy / Bad Guy
  - 2024 Female Fighter of the Year
- The Score
  - 2024 Female Fighter of the Half-Year
  - 2025 Female Fighter of the Half-Year
- MMA Sucka
  - 2022 Female Fighter of the Mid-Year
- Fight Matrix
  - 2018 Female Rookie of the Year
  - 2024 Female Fighter of the Year
- MMA Fighting
  - 2022 Second Team MMA All-Star
  - 2024 Second Team MMA All-Star
  - 2025 #5 Ranked Submission of the Year vs. Julianna Peña at UFC 316
- MMA Junkie
  - July 2019 Submission of the Month vs. Morgan Frier at PFL 4 (2019)
- Uncrowned
  - 2025 #2 Ranked Women's Fighter of the Year

== Mixed martial arts record ==
Professional record breakdown
21 matches	20 wins	1 loss
By knockout	6	0
By submission	9	0
By decision	5	1

Res.	Record	Opponent	Method	Event	Date	Round	Time	Location	Notes
Win	20–1	Amanda Nunes	Submission (rear-naked choke)	UFC 334	November 14, 2026	4	1:29	New York City, New York, United States	Defended the UFC Women's Bantamweight Championship. Performance of the Night.
Win	19–1	Julianna Peña	Submission (kimura)	UFC 316	June 7, 2025	2	4:55	Newark, New Jersey, United States	Won the UFC Women's Bantamweight Championship. Peña was deducted one point in round 1 due to illegal upkicks. Performance of the Night.
Win	18–1	Ketlen Vieira	Decision (unanimous)	UFC 307	October 5, 2024	3	5:00	Salt Lake City, Utah, United States	
Win	17–1	Holly Holm	Submission (rear-naked choke)	UFC 300	April 13, 2024	2	1:47	Las Vegas, Nevada, United States	Bantamweight debut.
Win	16–1	Aspen Ladd	Decision (unanimous)	PFL 10 (2023)	November 24, 2023	3	5:00	Washington, D.C., United States	Catchweight (150 lb) bout.
Loss	15–1	Larissa Pacheco	Decision (unanimous)	PFL 10 (2022)	November 25, 2022	5	5:00	New York City, New York, United States	2022 PFL Women's Lightweight Tournament Final.
Win	15–0	Martina Jindrová	Submission (arm-triangle choke)	PFL 9 (2022)	August 20, 2022	1	3:17	London, England	2022 PFL Women's Lightweight Tournament Semifinal.
Win	14–0	Kaitlin Young	TKO (punches)	PFL 6 (2022)	July 1, 2022	1	2:35	Atlanta, Georgia, United States	
Win	13–0	Marina Mokhnatkina	Decision (unanimous)	PFL 3 (2022)	May 6, 2022	3	5:00	Arlington, Texas, United States	
Win	12–0	Taylor Guardado	Submission (armbar)	PFL 10 (2021)	October 27, 2021	2	4:00	Hollywood, Florida, United States	Won the 2021 PFL Women's Lightweight Tournament.
Win	11–0	Genah Fabian	TKO (punches)	PFL 8 (2021)	August 19, 2021	1	4:01	Hollywood, Florida, United States	2021 PFL Women's Lightweight Tournament Semifinal.
Win	10–0	Cindy Dandois	Submission (armbar)	PFL 6 (2021)	June 25, 2021	1	4:44	Atlantic City, New Jersey, United States	
Win	9–0	Mariana Morais	TKO (punches)	PFL 3 (2021)	May 6, 2021	1	1:23	Atlantic City, New Jersey, United States	Return to Lightweight.
Win	8–0	Courtney King	TKO (punches)	Invicta FC 43	November 20, 2020	2	4:48	Kansas City, Kansas, United States	Featherweight debut.
Win	7–0	Larissa Pacheco	Decision (unanimous)	PFL 10 (2019)	December 31, 2019	5	5:00	New York City, New York, United States	Won the 2019 PFL Women's Lightweight Tournament.
Win	6–0	Bobbi Jo Dalziel	Submission (armbar)	PFL 7 (2019)	October 11, 2019	1	3:32	Las Vegas, Nevada, United States	2019 PFL Women's Lightweight Tournament Semifinal.
Win	5–0	Morgan Frier	Submission (keylock)	PFL 4 (2019)	July 11, 2019	1	3:35	Atlantic City, New Jersey, United States	
Win	4–0	Larissa Pacheco	Decision (unanimous)	PFL 1 (2019)	May 9, 2019	3	5:00	Uniondale, New York, United States	
Win	3–0	Moriel Charneski	TKO (punches)	PFL 11 (2018)	December 31, 2018	1	3:39	New York City, New York, United States	
Win	2–0	Jozette Cotton	TKO (punches)	PFL 6 (2018)	August 16, 2018	3	1:24	Atlantic City, New Jersey, United States	
Win	1–0	Brittney Elkin	Submission (armbar)	PFL 2 (2018)	June 21, 2018	1	3:18	Chicago, Illinois, United States	Lightweight debut.

== Judo record ==
Total tournament record: 208 wins and 50 losses.

Result	Rec.	Opponent	Score	Event	Division	Date	Location
Win	45–7	(France) Audrey Tcheuméo	100–000	2016 Olympic Games	‍–‍78 kg	August 11, 2016	(Brazil) Rio de Janeiro
Win	44–7	(Slovenia) Anamari Velenšek	100–000	2016 Olympic Games	‍–‍78 kg	August 11, 2016	(Brazil) Rio de Janeiro
Win	43–7	(Hungary) Abigél Joó	100–000	2016 Olympic Games	‍–‍78 kg	August 11, 2016	(Brazil) Rio de Janeiro
Win	42–7	(China) Zhang Zhehui	100–000	2016 Olympic Games	‍–‍78 kg	August 11, 2016	(Brazil) Rio de Janeiro
Win	41–7	(Brazil) Mayra Aguiar	100–000	2016 Pan American Championships	‍–‍78 kg	April 24, 2016	(Cuba) Havana
Win	40–7	(Canada) Catherine Roberge	100–000	2016 Pan American Championships	‍–‍78 kg	April 24, 2016	(Cuba) Havana
Win	39–7	(Venezuela) Andrymar Alfonzo	100–000	2016 Pan American Championships	‍–‍78 kg	April 24, 2016	(Cuba) Havana
Loss	38–7	(South Korea) Yoon Hyun-ji	000–010	2015 World Championships	‍–‍78 kg	August 28, 2015	(Kazakhstan) Astana
Win	38–6	(Guatemala) Mirla Nolberto	100–000	2015 World Championships	‍–‍78 kg	August 28, 2015	(Kazakhstan) Astana
Win	37–6	(Brazil) Mayra Aguiar	100–000s1	2015 Pan American Games	‍–‍78 kg	July 14, 2015	(Canada) Toronto
Win	36–6	(Canada) Catherine Roberge	100–000s3	2015 Pan American Games	‍–‍78 kg	July 14, 2015	(Canada) Toronto
Win	35–6	(Guatemala) Mirla Nolberto	100–000	2015 Pan American Games	‍–‍78 kg	July 14, 2015	(Canada) Toronto
Loss	34–6	(Brazil) Mayra Aguiar	000–000	2015 Pan American Championships	‍–‍78 kg	April 24, 2015	(Canada) Edmonton
Win	34–5	(Canada) Catherine Roberge	100–000	2015 Pan American Championships	‍–‍78 kg	April 24, 2015	(Canada) Edmonton
Win	33–5	(Mexico) Miriam Gonzalez	101–000	2015 Pan American Championships	‍–‍78 kg	April 24, 2015	(Canada) Edmonton
Win	32–5	(Portugal) Yahima Ramirez	000–000	2014 World Championships	‍–‍78 kg	August 29, 2014	(Russia) Chelyabinsk
Loss	31–5	(Brazil) Mayra Aguiar	001–011	2014 World Championships	‍–‍78 kg	August 29, 2014	(Russia) Chelyabinsk
Win	31–4	(Slovenia) Anamari Velenšek	100–000	2014 World Championships	‍–‍78 kg	August 29, 2014	(Russia) Chelyabinsk
Win	30–4	(Chinese Taipei) Wang Szu-chu	101–000	2014 World Championships	‍–‍78 kg	August 29, 2014	(Russia) Chelyabinsk
Win	29–4	(Canada) Catherine Roberge	000–000	2014 World Championships	‍–‍78 kg	August 29, 2014	(Russia) Chelyabinsk
Win	28–4	(Ecuador) Vanessa Chalá	N/A	2013 Pan American Championships	‍–‍70 kg	April 19, 2013	(Costa Rica) San José
Win	27–4	(Canada) Alix Renaud-Roy	N/A	2013 Pan American Championships	‍–‍70 kg	April 19, 2013	(Costa Rica) San José
Win	26–4	(Guatemala) Jenifer Ortiz	N/A	2013 Pan American Championships	‍–‍70 kg	April 19, 2013	(Costa Rica) San José
Loss	25–4	(Colombia) Yuri Alvear	N/A	2013 Pan American Championships	‍–‍70 kg	April 19, 2013	(Costa Rica) San José
Win	25–3	(Venezuela) Elvismar Rodríguez	N/A	2013 Pan American Championships	‍–‍70 kg	April 19, 2013	(Costa Rica) San José
Win	24–3	(United Kingdom) Gemma Gibbons	0020–0000	2012 Olympic Games	‍–‍78 kg	August 2, 2012	(United Kingdom) London
Win	23–3	(Brazil) Mayra Aguiar	1010–0000	2012 Olympic Games	‍–‍78 kg	August 2, 2012	(United Kingdom) London
Win	22–3	(Hungary) Abigél Joó	1010–0100	2012 Olympic Games	‍–‍78 kg	August 2, 2012	(United Kingdom) London
Win	21–3	(Russia) Vera Moskalyuk	1000–0000	2012 Olympic Games	‍–‍78 kg	August 2, 2012	(United Kingdom) London
Win	20–3	(Canada) Catherine Roberge	011–001	2011 Pan American Games	‍–‍78 kg	October 27, 2011	(Mexico) Guadalajara
Win	19–3	(Cuba) Yalennis Castillo	002–001	2011 Pan American Games	‍–‍78 kg	October 27, 2011	(Mexico) Guadalajara
Win	18–3	(Brazil) Mayra Aguiar	001–000	2011 Pan American Games	‍–‍78 kg	October 27, 2011	(Mexico) Guadalajara
Win	17–3	(Netherlands) Marhinde Verkerk	001–000	2011 World Championships	‍–‍78 kg	August 26, 2011	(France) Paris
Loss	16–3	(France) Audrey Tcheuméo	000–001	2011 World Championships	‍–‍78 kg	August 26, 2011	(France) Paris
Win	16–2	(Japan) Hitomi Ikeda	010–000	2011 World Championships	‍–‍78 kg	August 26, 2011	(France) Paris
Win	15–2	(Mongolia) Pürevjargalyn Lkhamdegd	101–000	2011 World Championships	‍–‍78 kg	August 26, 2011	(France) Paris
Win	14–2	(Canada) Catherine Roberge	001–000	2011 World Championships	‍–‍78 kg	August 26, 2011	(France) Paris
Win	13–2	(Brazil) Mayra Aguiar	000–000	2011 Pan American Championships	‍–‍78 kg	April 1, 2011	(Mexico) Guadalajara
Win	12–2	(Cuba) Yalennis Castillo	000–000	2011 Pan American Championships	‍–‍78 kg	April 1, 2011	(Mexico) Guadalajara
Win	11–2	(Haiti) Nadjeda Gena	102–000	2011 Pan American Championships	‍–‍78 kg	April 1, 2011	(Mexico) Guadalajara
Win	10–2	(Colombia) Anny Cortés	102–000	2011 Pan American Championships	‍–‍78 kg	April 1, 2011	(Mexico) Guadalajara
Win	9–2	(Brazil) Mayra Aguiar	001–000	2010 World Championships	‍–‍78 kg	September 9, 2010	(Japan) Tokyo
Win	8–2	(Ukraine) Maryna Pryshchepa	102–000	2010 World Championships	‍–‍78 kg	September 9, 2010	(Japan) Tokyo
Win	7–2	(France) Céline Lebrun	000–001	2010 World Championships	‍–‍78 kg	September 9, 2010	(Japan) Tokyo
Win	6–2	(Slovenia) Anamari Velenšek	100–000	2010 World Championships	‍–‍78 kg	September 9, 2010	(Japan) Tokyo
Win	5–2	(Germany) Luise Malzahn	003–000	2010 World Championships	‍–‍78 kg	September 9, 2010	(Japan) Tokyo
Win	4–2	(Guatemala) Mirla Nolberto	100–000	2010 Pan American Championships	‍–‍78 kg	April 9, 2010	(El Salvador) San Salvador
Win	3–2	(Venezuela) Keivi Pinto	110–000	2010 Pan American Championships	‍–‍78 kg	April 9, 2010	(El Salvador) San Salvador
Loss	2–2	(Brazil) Mayra Aguiar	000–100	2010 Pan American Championships	‍–‍78 kg	April 9, 2010	(El Salvador) San Salvador
Win	2–1	(Argentina) Lorena Briceño	100–000	2010 Pan American Championships	‍–‍78 kg	April 9, 2010	(El Salvador) San Salvador
Loss	1–1	(Canada) Amy Cotton	000–001	2009 World Championships	‍–‍78 kg	August 26, 2009	(Netherlands) Rotterdam
Win	1–0	(United Kingdom) Samantha Lowe	000–000	2009 World Championships	‍–‍78 kg	August 26, 2009	(Netherlands) Rotterdam

== See also ==
- List of current UFC fighters
- List of female mixed martial artists
- List of multi-sport athletes
- List of multi-sport champions
- List of Olympic medalists in judo
- List of Professional Fighters League champions
- List of UFC champions
- List of world champions in judo

Achievements
New championship	1st PFL Lightweight World Tournament Champion; December 31, 2019	Incumbent
Preceded by Kayla Harrison	2nd PFL Lightweight World Tournament Champion; October 27, 2021	Succeeded by Larissa Pacheco
Preceded by Julianna Peña	9th UFC Women's Bantamweight Champion; June 7, 2025 – present	Incumbent
Awards
Preceded by Zhang Weili	World MMA Female Fighter of the Year; July 1, 2024 – December 31, 2025	Incumbent
