= 2016 European Judo Championships – Women's 78 kg =

Judo Women's 78 kg at the 2016 European Judo Championships
- Venue: TatNeft Arena
- Location: Kazan, Russia
- Date: 23 April
- Competitors: 18 from 12 nations

Medalists
gold medal	Audrey Tcheuméo (3rd title)	France
silver medal	Guusje Steenhuis	Netherlands
bronze medal	Natalie Powell	Great Britain
bronze medal	Luise Malzahn	Germany

Competition at external databases
- Links: IJF • JudoInside

The women's 78 kg competition at the 2016 European Judo Championships was held on 23 April at the TatNeft Arena, in Kazan, the capital city of Tatarstan, Russia.

== Results ==
=== Finals ===
Final
Audrey Tcheuméo (FRA)	10
Guusje Steenhuis (NED)	00

=== Repechage ===
Repechage
Gemma Gibbons (GBR)	01
Marhinde Verkerk (NED)	00

Third place
Gemma Gibbons (GBR)	00
Natalie Powell (GBR)	10

Repechage
Abigél Joó (HUN)	00
Anamari Velenšek (SLO)	10

Third place
Anamari Velenšek (SLO)	00
Luise Malzahn (GER)	01

=== Top half ===
First round
Evelin Salánki (HUN)	00
Antonina Shmeleva (RUS)	01

Round of 16
Audrey Tcheuméo (FRA)	10
Brigita Matić (CRO)	00
Gemma Gibbons (GBR)
Viktoriya Turks (UKR)
Marhinde Verkerk (NED)	10
Antonina Shmeleva (RUS)	00
Luise Malzahn (GER)	00
Laia Talarn (ESP)	00

Quarterfinals
Audrey Tcheuméo (FRA)	10
Gemma Gibbons (GBR)	00
Marhinde Verkerk (NED)	00
Luise Malzahn (GER)	00

Semifinals
Audrey Tcheuméo (FRA)	00
Luise Malzahn (GER)	00

=== Bottom half ===
First round
Anastasiya Turchyn (UKR)	00
Daria Pogorzelec (POL)	10

Round of 16
Guusje Steenhuis (NED)	11
Daria Pogorzelec (POL)	00
Abigél Joó (HUN)	10
Yahima Ramirez (POR)	00
Anamari Velenšek (SLO)	10
Marta Tort (ESP)	00
Natalie Powell (GBR)	10
Ivana Maranić (CRO)	00

Quarterfinals
Guusje Steenhuis (NED)	11
Abigél Joó (HUN)	00
Anamari Velenšek (SLO)	00
Natalie Powell (GBR)	01

Semifinals
Guusje Steenhuis (NED)	01
Natalie Powell (GBR)	00
