= Mayra Aguiar =

Brazilian judoka (born 1991)

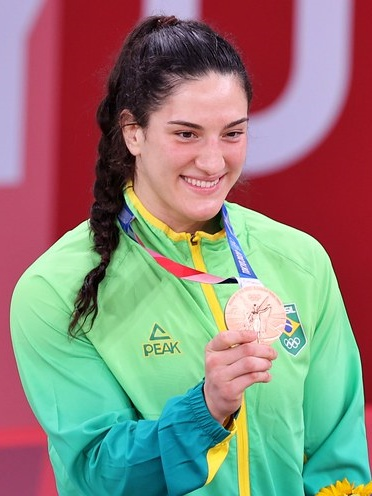
- Aguiar at the 2020 Summer Olympics

Personal information
- Full name: Mayra Aguiar da Silva
- Born: 3 August 1991 (age 35) Porto Alegre, Rio Grande do Sul, Brazil
- Occupation: Judoka
- Height: 1.78 m (5 ft 10 in)
- Website: www.mayraaguiar.com.br

Sport
- Country: Brazil
- Sport: Judo
- Weight class: ‍–‍78 kg
- Club: Sogipa; Brazilian Judo Confederation
- Coached by: Antônio Carlos Pereira "Kiko"
- Retired: 26 December 2024

Achievements and titles
- Olympic Games: (bronze) (2012, 2016, 2020)
- World Champ.: (gold) (2014, 2017, 2022)
- Pan American Champ.: (gold) (2008, 2010, 2012, 2013, 2015, 2019, 2022, 2023)
Medal record
Women's judo
Representing Brazil
Olympic Games
Bronze medal – third place	2012 London	‍–‍78 kg
Bronze medal – third place	2016 Rio de Janeiro	‍–‍78 kg
Bronze medal – third place	2020 Tokyo	‍–‍78 kg
World Championships
Gold medal – first place	2014 Chelyabinsk	‍–‍78 kg
Gold medal – first place	2017 Budapest	‍–‍78 kg
Gold medal – first place	2022 Tashkent	‍–‍78 kg
Silver medal – second place	2010 Tokyo	‍–‍78 kg
Silver medal – second place	2013 Rio de Janeiro	Women's team
Bronze medal – third place	2011 Paris	‍–‍78 kg
Bronze medal – third place	2013 Rio de Janeiro	‍–‍78 kg
Bronze medal – third place	2019 Tokyo	‍–‍78 kg
Pan American Games
Gold medal – first place	2019 Lima	‍–‍78 kg
Silver medal – second place	2007 Rio de Janeiro	‍–‍70 kg
Silver medal – second place	2015 Toronto	‍–‍78 kg
Bronze medal – third place	2011 Guadalajara	‍–‍78 kg
Pan American Championships
Gold medal – first place	2008 Miami	‍–‍70 kg
Gold medal – first place	2010 San Salvador	‍–‍78 kg
Gold medal – first place	2012 Montreal	‍–‍78 kg
Gold medal – first place	2013 San José	‍–‍78 kg
Gold medal – first place	2015 Edmonton	‍–‍78 kg
Gold medal – first place	2019 Lima	‍–‍78 kg
Gold medal – first place	2022 Lima	‍–‍78 kg
Gold medal – first place	2023 Calgary	‍–‍78 kg
Silver medal – second place	2007 Montreal	‍–‍70 kg
Silver medal – second place	2011 Guadalajara	‍–‍78 kg
Silver medal – second place	2016 Havana	‍–‍78 kg
World Masters
Gold medal – first place	2012 Almaty	‍–‍78 kg
Gold medal – first place	2013 Tyumen	‍–‍78 kg
Silver medal – second place	2016 Guadalajara	‍–‍78 kg
Bronze medal – third place	2022 Jerusalem	‍–‍78 kg
IJF Grand Slam
Gold medal – first place	2011 Rio de Janeiro	‍–‍78 kg
Gold medal – first place	2012 Paris	‍–‍78 kg
Gold medal – first place	2014 Tyumen	‍–‍78 kg
Gold medal – first place	2016 Paris	‍–‍78 kg
Gold medal – first place	2019 Düsseldorf	‍–‍78 kg
Gold medal – first place	2023 Tokyo	‍–‍78 kg
Silver medal – second place	2013 Moscow	‍–‍78 kg
Silver medal – second place	2015 Abu Dhabi	‍–‍78 kg
Silver medal – second place	2018 Düsseldorf	‍–‍78 kg
Silver medal – second place	2019 Ekaterinburg	‍–‍78 kg
Silver medal – second place	2020 Düsseldorf	‍–‍78 kg
Silver medal – second place	2022 Tbilisi	‍–‍78 kg
Bronze medal – third place	2010 Rio de Janeiro	‍–‍78 kg
Bronze medal – third place	2011 Paris	‍–‍78 kg
Bronze medal – third place	2011 Moscow	‍–‍78 kg
Bronze medal – third place	2011 Tokyo	‍–‍78 kg
Bronze medal – third place	2017 Abu Dhabi	‍–‍78 kg
Bronze medal – third place	2018 Ekaterinburg	‍–‍78 kg
Bronze medal – third place	2022 Budapest	‍–‍78 kg
Bronze medal – third place	2023 Baku	‍–‍78 kg
IJF Grand Prix
Gold medal – first place	2017 Cancún	‍–‍78 kg
Gold medal – first place	2019 Budapest	‍–‍78 kg
Silver medal – second place	2018 Hohhot	‍–‍78 kg
Silver medal – second place	2018 Cancún	‍–‍78 kg
Bronze medal – third place	2016 Tbilisi	‍–‍78 kg
Bronze medal – third place	2022 Zagreb	‍–‍78 kg
World Juniors Championships
Gold medal – first place	2010 Agadir	‍–‍78 kg
Silver medal – second place	2008 Bangkok	‍–‍70 kg
Bronze medal – third place	2006 Santo Domingo	‍–‍70 kg
Bronze medal – third place	2009 Paris	‍–‍78 kg

Profile at external databases
- IJF: 1039
- JudoInside.com: 43348
- Updated on 3 December 2023

Mayra Aguiar da Silva (born 3 August 1991) is a Brazilian retired judoka. She was a bronze medallist in three consecutive Olympics, 2012, 2016 and 2020. She is also three-time world champion (2014, 2017 & 2022). She is the first Brazilian woman to win three Olympic medals in an individual sport, being the best female judoka in the history of Brazil.

Aguiar was born in Porto Alegre and began judo training when she was young.

Aguiar trains under Kiko (Antônio Carlos Pereira) in a group with João Derly in SOGIPA. Derly and Camilo are also her sporting idols.

== Career ==
=== 2006–2008 ===
At 15 years old, she won a bronze at the 2006 World Judo Juniors Championships.

At the 2007 Pan American Judo Championships, she won a silver medal.

When she was still 15 years old, she competed at 2007 Pan American Games in Rio de Janeiro and won a silver medal, losing in the final to future UFC champion Ronda Rousey.

At the 2008 Pan American Judo Championships held in Miami, she became champion of this competition for the first time, obtaining the gold medal.

==== 2008 Summer Olympics ====
In 2008, Aguiar competed at Olympic Games in Beijing but lost her only match with Spanish judoka Leire Iglesias.

==== After the 2008 Summer Olympics ====
At the 2008 World Judo Juniors Championships, she won a silver medal.

In December 2008, Aguiar suffered a serious injury to her right knee. She was unable to perform any judo training for almost ten months, coming back only in September 2009.

=== 2009–2012 ===
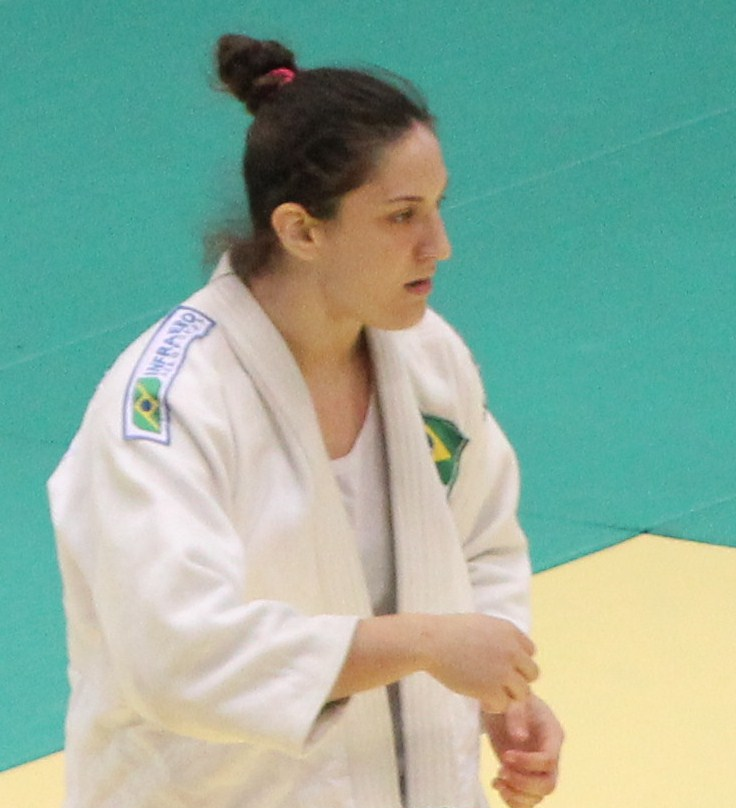
Aguiar in 2010.

After spending ten months away from the mat due to knee surgery, in October 2009, Aguiar won the bronze medal in the 78 kg category at the 2009 World Judo Juniors Championships in Paris.

In 2010, after the injury, Aguiar changed category from middleweight to half-heavyweight and won a gold medal at 2010 Pan American Championships in El Salvador. At the 2010 Judo Grand Slam Rio de Janeiro (Grand Slam is the tournament that gives the most points in the judo ranking after the Olympic Games, the World Championships and the World Masters), she defeated the French number 1 in the ‍–‍78 kg category, Celine Lebrun, and reached the bronze medal. In September of that same year, she participated at the 2010 World Championships and lost the final to Kayla Harrison from the United States, receiving the silver medal. By winning gold at the 2010 World Judo Juniors Championships in Agadir, Mayra became the athlete with the most medals in the competition of all time.

At the 2011 Judo Grand Slam Paris, Aguiar won a bronze medal. At the 2011 Pan American Judo Championships she won a silver medal. At the 2011 Judo Grand Slam Moscow, Aguiar won a bronze medal. She won gold at the 2011 Judo Grand Slam Rio de Janeiro defeating Kayla Harrison. At the 2011 World Judo Championships, Aguiar won the bronze medal. She was only defeated in the semifinals by world No. 1, Japanese Akari Ogata. At the age of 20, at the 2011 Pan American Games, she faced, in her second fight, the American Kayla Harrison, the main candidate for gold, losing but later obtaining the bronze medal in the competition. She ended the year by obtaining a bronze medal in the 2011 Judo Grand Slam Tokyo.

At the beginning of 2012, she won her first title in World Masters (the second most important competition on the judo circuit after the World Championships). At the age of 20, she won the gold medal at the 2012 Judo World Masters held in Almaty. After winning the 2012 Judo Grand Slam Paris, she took first place in the world rankings in the under-78 kg category. It was the first time that a Brazilian woman topped the ranking created by the IJF in 2009. She became three-time champion of the Pan American Judo Championship, at the 2012 Pan American Judo Championships in Montreal.

==== 2012 Summer Olympics ====
In 2012, Aguiar won a bronze medal at the 2012 Summer Olympics, winning three matches by ippon. Her only defeat was again to Harrison, who won the semifinal on the way to a gold medal.

=== 2013–2016 ===
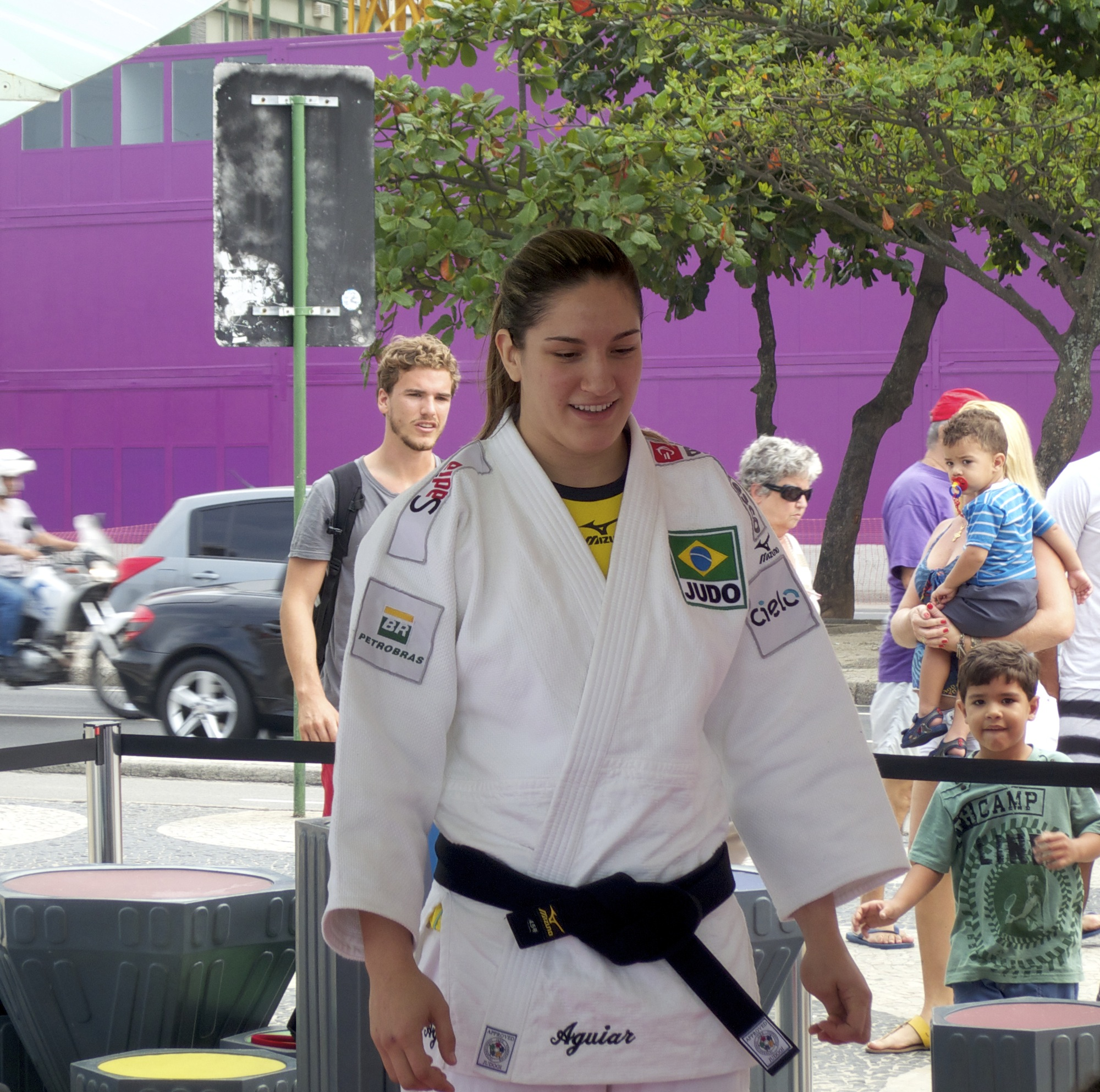
Aguiar in 2013.

Mayra won gold again at the 2013 Pan American Judo Championships, becoming four-time champion. In 2013, Aguiar obtained another Masters gold by winning the 2013 Judo World Masters in Tyumen. With this, she was once again number 1 in the world rankings. At the 2013 Judo Grand Slam Moscow, she won a silver medal. At the 2013 World Judo Championships, held in Rio de Janeiro, she obtained a bronze in her ‍–‍78 kg category and a silver with the Brazilian women's team.

After the 2013 World Championships, she only returned to competition in July 2014, at the 2014 Judo Grand Slam Tyumen, where she won four matches and secured the gold medal, defeating her rival Kayla Harrison. Aguiar became world champion for the first time in 2014, defeating the French Audrey Tcheuméo in the final.

Aguiar didn't fight for 8 months after winning the world title, until she entered the 2015 Pan American Judo Championships and became five-time champion of the tournament. At the 2015 Pan American Games, she won a silver medal. In November, she also won the silver medal at the 2015 Judo Grand Slam Abu Dhabi.

In February 2016, Aguiar won the gold medal at the 2016 Judo Grand Slam Paris, becoming two-time champion of this tournament and defeating the American Kayla Harrison, her biggest rival in the category, by ippon in the final. It was the second time she won the French Grand Slam defeating Harrison. At this point, she had the advantage in retrospect against Harrison (eight victories in 15 clashes). At the 2016 Pan American Judo Championships in Havana, in a new final Aguiar x Harrison, the American tied the match between the two, leaving Aguiar with the silver. In the final of the ‍–‍78 kg category of the 2016 Judo World Masters, the 17th duel between Aguiar and Harrison took place, where the American applied an armbar (juji-gatame) in the final minute, winning the fight. Aguiar won the silver medal, her third Masters medal.

==== 2016 Summer Olympics ====
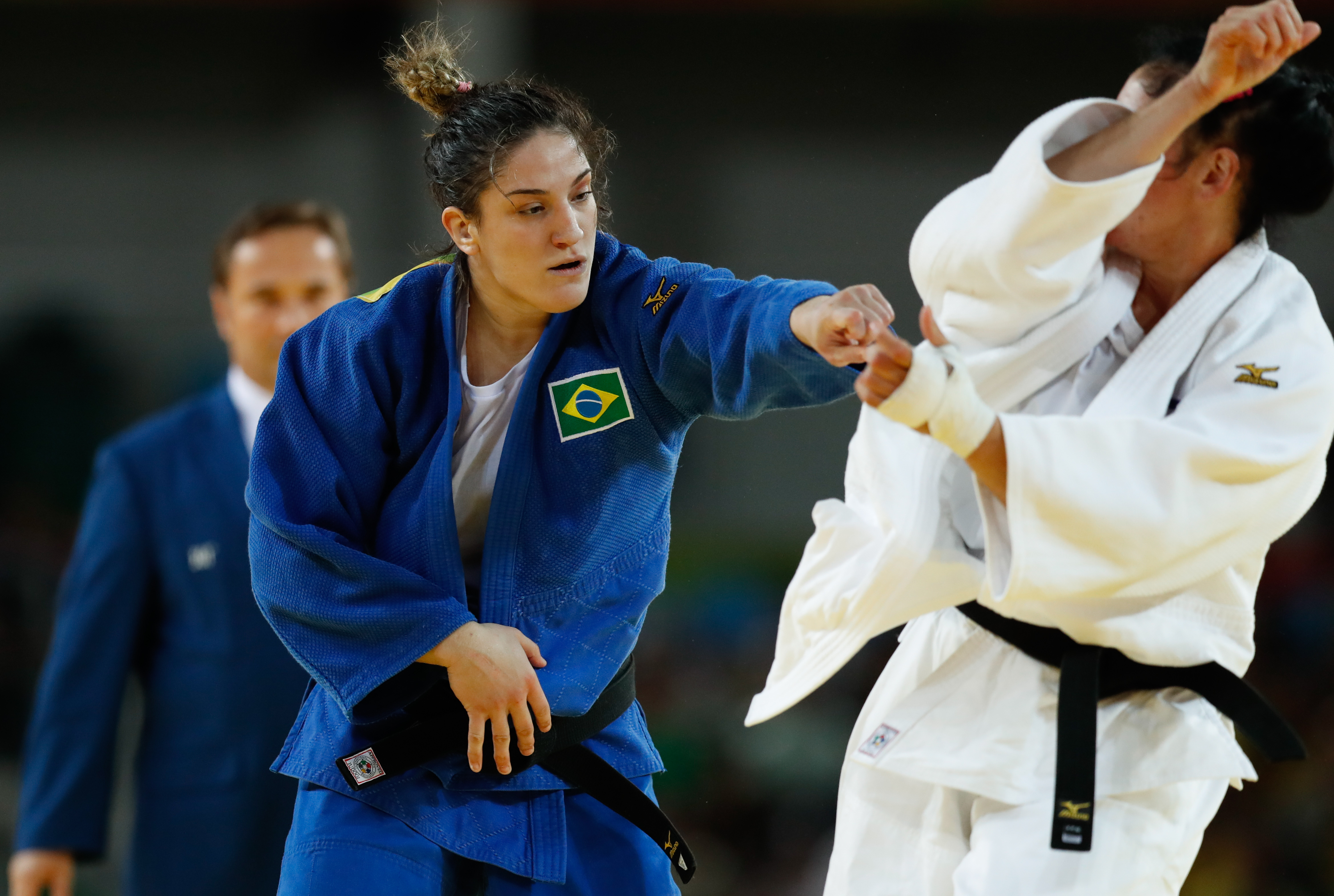
Aguiar in the bronze medal match at the 2016 Summer Olympics.

With Brazil hosting the 2016 Summer Olympics and Aguiar's recent triumphs, she was the favorite to win the gold. A difficult semi-final against Tcheuméo, where Aguiar was kept scoreless and was defeated on penalties, sent her again to the bronze match, which Aguiar won, giving her a second Olympic medal.

=== 2017–2021 ===
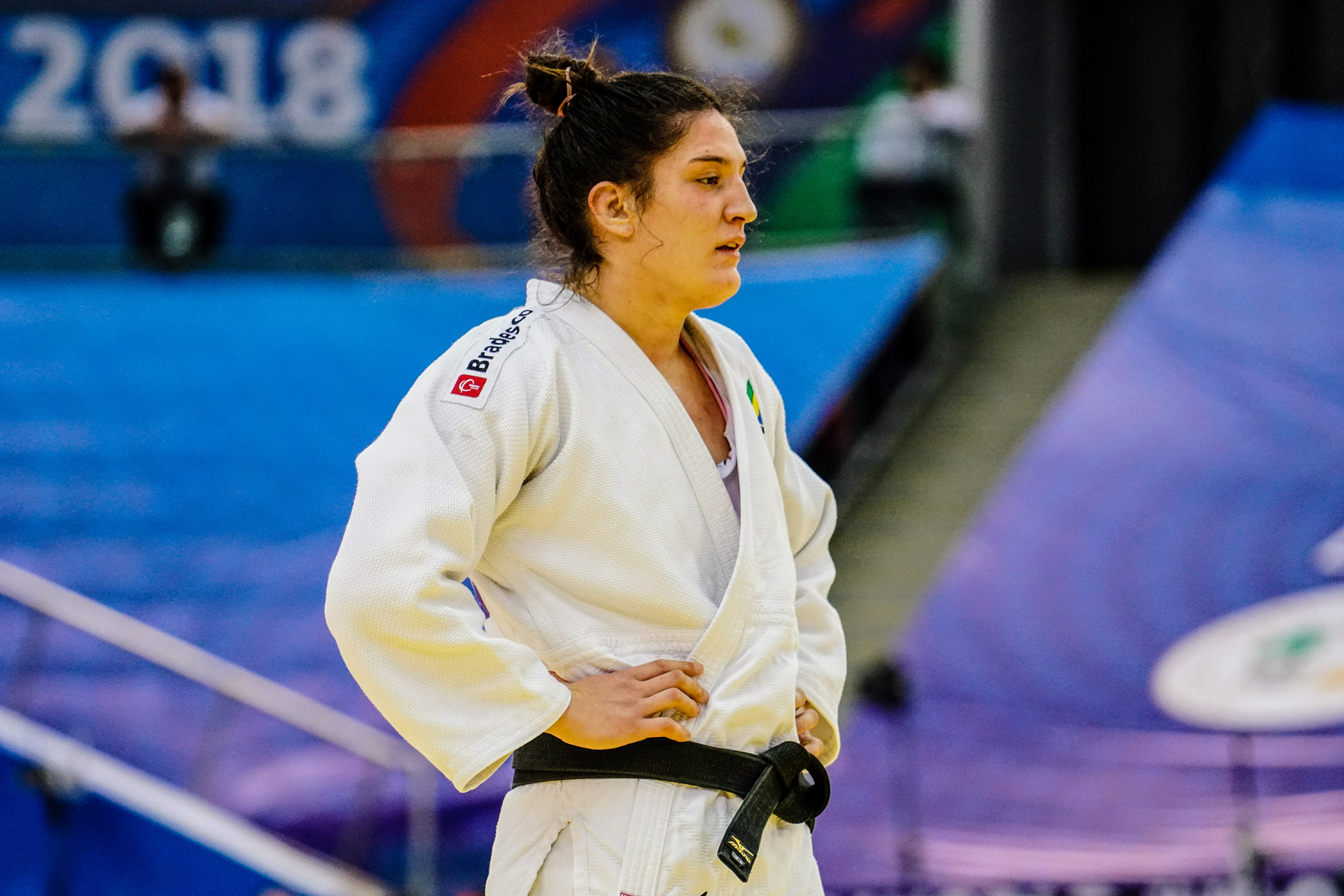
Aguiar at the 2018 World Judo Championships.

After the 2016 Olympic Games, Mayra took a period of time to rest and focus on training. She returned in June 2017, winning the 2017 Judo Grand Prix Cancún in Mexico. In her second competition of the year, the 2017 World Judo Championships, she defeated two Japanese in a row to become two-time world champion. This year, she also won bronze in the 2017 Judo Grand Slam Abu Dhabi.

In March 2018, she had reached the podium in the two competitions she had competed in that year: in February, she took silver at the 2018 Judo Grand Slam Düsseldorf, and in March, she took bronze at the 2018 Judo Grand Slam Ekaterinburg, occupying second place in the world rankings at that time. When she won silver in the 2018 Judo Grand Prix Hohhot, she was already the leader of the world rankings again. In 2018 she even won silver in the 2018 Judo Grand Prix Cancún.

In 2019, Aguiar won gold at the 2019 Judo Grand Slam Düsseldorf and silver at the 2019 Judo Grand Slam Ekaterinburg. At the 2019 Pan American Judo Championships, she became six-time champion of the tournament. She was champion of the 2019 Judo Grand Prix Budapest in July. When she was leader of the world rankings in the ‍–‍78 kg category, Aguiar, aged 28, won her first gold medal at the Pan American Games, at the 2019 Pan American Games, in Lima, Peru. And at the 2019 Judo World Championships, Aguiar won the bronze medal, the Brazilian's sixth medal at the world championships. With this, Aguiar isolates herself as the greatest Brazilian female medalist in the history of the world championships.

In early 2020, Aguiar won a silver medal at the 2020 Judo Grand Slam Düsseldorf.

==== 2020 Summer Olympics ====
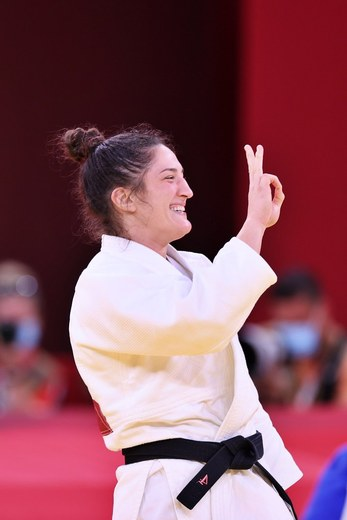
Aguiar celebrating her third Olympic bronze medal, won at the Tokyo 2020 Olympic Games.

In 2021, Aguiar won one of the bronze medals in the women's 78 kg event at the 2020 Summer Olympics in Tokyo, Japan.

=== 2022–2024 ===
After the return of world sports competitions, Mayra achieved great results in 2022. In April, at 2022 Pan American-Oceania Judo Championships, she became seven-time champion of the tournament. She obtained the silver of the 2022 Judo Grand Slam Tbilisi in June, the bronze of the 2022 Judo Grand Slam Budapest and the bronze of the 2022 Judo Grand Prix Zagreb, in July. In October 2022, she made history by becoming the first Brazilian three-time judo world champion, at the 2022 World Judo Championships. In the quarter-finals, she defeated German Alina Boehm, current European champion. In the semifinals, she defeated Hamada Shori, the current Olympic champion, by ippon. The gold was won against Chinese Zhenzhao Ma. And, at the end of the year, when she was 2nd in the world rankings in her category, she won a bronze in the 2022 Judo World Masters in Jerusalem, thus returning to the lead in the world rankings.

After the 2022 Masters, Aguiar was away from competition for nine months, to rest and treat minor injuries. She returned in September 2023, at the Pan American Judo Championship. At the 2023 Pan American-Oceania Judo Championships, held in Calgary, Canada, she became eight-time champion of the competition. Still in September, she was a bronze medalist at the 2023 Judo Grand Slam Baku, and in December, she secured an unprecedented gold for Brazilian judo by winning the 2023 Judo Grand Slam Tokyo. The only Brazilian champion in Japan until then was Sergio Pessoa, who won the Jigoro Kano Cup in 1986, in a different format than the current one.

Becoming the first judoka in five Olympics, Aguiar lost right away at the 2024 Summer Olympics to then world leader Alice Bellandi. After the fight, she revealed in an interview to have struggled with pain, insomnia and an eating disorder, and even took part in no competitions in 2024 hoping to be in her best shape at the Olympics. Skipping the mixed team tournament due to a bad physical condition, her absence from the listed judoka made Aguiar not get a bronze medal. Aguiar would announce her retirement by the end of the year.

== Achievements ==
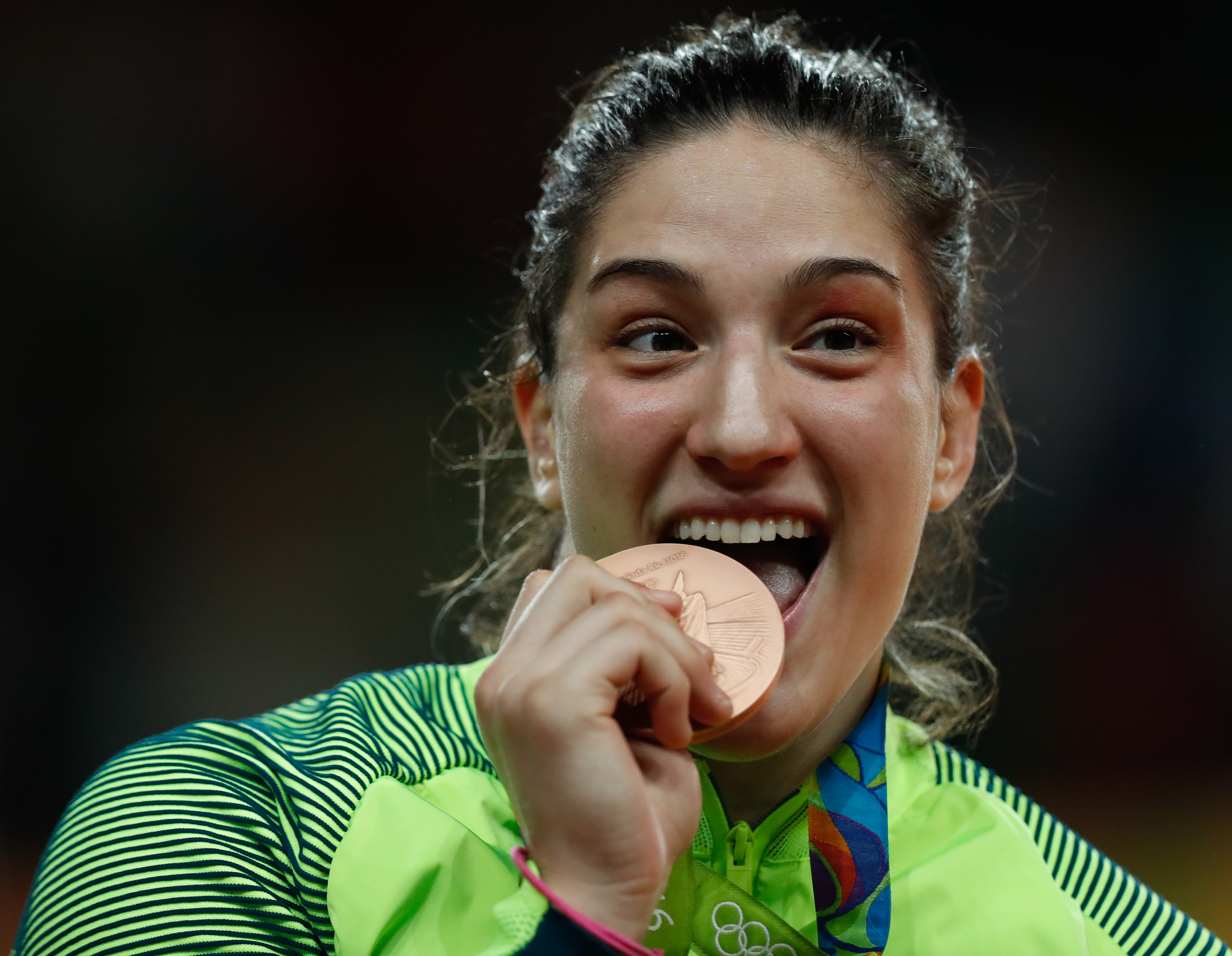
Aguiar with her bronze medal obtained at the 2016 Olympic Games in Rio de Janeiro.

Year	Tournament	Place	Weight class
2007	Pan American Games	2nd	Middleweight (−70 kg)
2008	Olympic Games	20th	Middleweight (−70 kg)
2010	Pan American Championships	1st	Half-Heavyweight (−78 kg)
2010	World Championships	2nd	Half-Heavyweight (−78 kg)
2011	Pan American Championships	2nd	Half-Heavyweight (−78 kg)
2012	Olympic Games	3rd	Half-Heavyweight (−78 kg)
2016	Olympic Games	3rd	Half-Heavyweight (−78 kg)
2017	World Championships	1st	Half-Heavyweight (−78 kg)
2019	Pan American Championships	1st	Half-Heavyweight (−78 kg)
2019	World Championships	3rd	Half-Heavyweight (−78 kg)
2019	Pan American Games	1st	Half-Heavyweight (−78 kg)
2021	Olympic Games	3rd	Half-Heavyweight (−78 kg)
2022	World Championships	1st	Half-Heavyweight (−78 kg)

Awards
Preceded by Rafaela Silva	Brazilian Sportswomen of the Year; 2017	Succeeded by Ana Marcela Cunha
