= Judo at the 2014 Commonwealth Games – Women's 78 kg =

Judo Judo – Women's 78 kg at the 2014 Commonwealth Games
- Venue: Scottish Exhibition and Conference Centre
- Date: 26 July 2014
- Competitors: 7 from 7 nations

Medalists
gold medal	Natalie Powell	Wales
silver medal	Gemma Gibbons	England
bronze medal	Ana Laura Portuondo Isasi	Canada
bronze medal	Hortense Mballa Atanga	Cameroon

The women's 78 kg Judo competitions at the 2014 Commonwealth Games in Glasgow, Scotland was held on 26 July at the Scottish Exhibition and Conference Centre. Judo will return to the program, after last being competed back in 2002.

== Results ==
=== Preliminaries ===
Quarterfinals		Semifinals		Gold medal match
		N Powell (WAL)	1100
AL Portuondo (CAN)	1000	AL Portuondo (CAN)	0001
JD Chongtham (IND)	0001			N Powell (WAL)	0011
G Gibbons (ENG)	1010			G Gibbons (ENG)	0002
B Rose (SEY)	0000	G Gibbons (ENG)	1000
H Mballa Atanga (CMR)	1010	H Mballa Atanga (CMR)	0000
A Muragu (KEN)	0001

=== Repechages ===
Repechage		Bronze medal
		B Rose (SEY)	000
B Rose (SEY)	100	AL Portuondo (CAN)	100
A Muragu (KEN)	000

Bronze medal
JD Chongtham (IND)	000
H Mballa Atanga (CMR)	101
