= Judo at the 2015 Pan American Games – Women's 78 kg =

Women's 78 kg at the 2015 Pan American Games
- Venue: Mississauga Sports Centre
- Dates: July 14
- Competitors: 10 from 10 nations

Medalists
Gold medal	Kayla Harrison	United States
Silver medal	Mayra Aguiar	Brazil
Bronze medal	Yalennis Castillo	Cuba
Bronze medal	Catherine Roberge	Canada

The women's 78 kg competition of the judo events at the 2015 Pan American Games in Toronto, Canada, was held on July 14 at the Mississauga Sports Centre near Toronto.

== Schedule ==
All times are Central Standard Time (UTC-6).

Date	Time	Round
July 14, 2015	15:00	Preliminary bout
July 14, 2015	15:28	Quarterfinals
July 14, 2015	15:35	Repechage
July 14, 2015	16:52	Semifinals
July 14, 2015	20:00	Bronze medal matches
July 14, 2015	20:14	Final

== Results ==
Legend

- 1st number = Ippon
- 2nd number = Waza-ari
- 3rd number = Yuko

=== Bracket ===
Preliminaries
Andrymar Alfonzo (VEN)	000S3
Diana Chalá (ECU)	000S2
Jacqueline Usnayo (CHI)	100
Luisa Bonilla (COL)	000

Quarter Finals
Kayla Harrison (USA)	100
Mirla Nolberto (GUA)	000
Catherine Roberge (CAN)	000
Diana Chalá (ECU)	000S2
Mayra Aguiar (BRA)	100
Liliana Cardenas (MEX)	000
Yalennis Castillo (CUB)	011
Jacqueline Usnayo (CHI)	000S2

Semi Finals
Kayla Harrison (USA)	000
Catherine Roberge (CAN)	000S3
Mayra Aguiar (BRA)	000
Yalennis Castillo (CUB)	000S2

Final
Kayla Harrison (USA)	100
Mayra Aguiar (BRA)	000S1

=== Repechage round ===
Two bronze medals were awarded.

Repechage		Bronze medal
Mirla Nolberto (GUA)	000S1
Diana Chalá (ECU)	000	Diana Chalá (ECU)	000
		Yalennis Castillo (CUB)	101

Repechage		Bronze medal
Liliana Cardenas (MEX)	000S2
Jacqueline Usnayo (CHI)	000S1	Jacqueline Usnayo (CHI)	000S1
		Catherine Roberge (CAN)	001S1
