= Audrey Koumba =

Gabonese judoka (born 1989)

Personal information
- Born: 8 April 1989 (age 36)
- Occupation: Judoka

Sport
- Sport: Judo

Profile at external databases
- IJF: 4181, 4182, 4183
- JudoInside.com: 42754

Adjane Audrey Koumba (born 8 April 1989 in Libreville) is a Gabonese judoka. She competed at the 2012 Summer Olympics in the -78 kg event and was eliminated in her second match by Abigél Joó of Hungary.
