= Anastasiya Dmitrieva =

Russian judoka (born 1987)

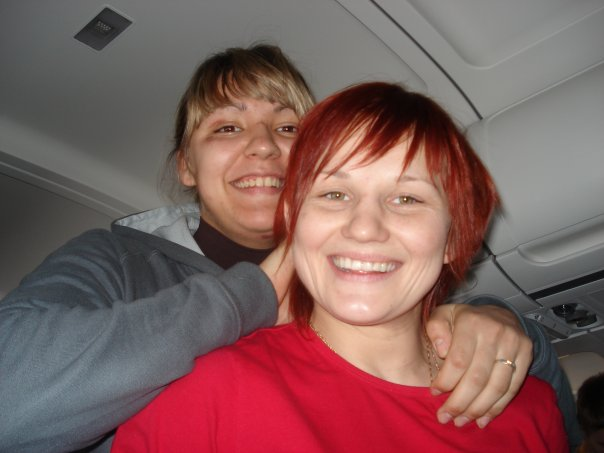

Personal information
- Born: 12 March 1987 (age 39)
- Occupation: Judoka

Sport
- Country: Russia
- Sport: Judo
- Weight class: ‍–‍78 kg

Achievements and titles
- World Champ.: R32 (2011, 2015)
- European Champ.: 7th (2014)
Medal record
Women's judo
Representing Russia
IJF Grand Slam
Bronze medal – third place	2014 Baku	‍–‍78 kg
Bronze medal – third place	2016 Tyumen	‍–‍78 kg
IJF Grand Prix
Gold medal – first place	2013 Almaty	‍–‍78 kg
Gold medal – first place	2017 Antalya	‍–‍78 kg
Silver medal – second place	2013 Samsun	‍–‍78 kg
Silver medal – second place	2013 Qingdao	‍–‍78 kg
Bronze medal – third place	2013 Miami	‍–‍78 kg
Bronze medal – third place	2013 Abu Dhabi	‍–‍78 kg
Bronze medal – third place	2016 Qingdao	‍–‍78 kg
Bronze medal – third place	2017 Tashkent	‍–‍78 kg
Bronze medal – third place	2018 Agadir	‍–‍78 kg
Summer Universiade
Bronze medal – third place	2013 Kazan	Women's team

Profile at external databases
- IJF: 2763
- JudoInside.com: 42682
- Updated on 25 November 2022

Anastasiya Dmitrieva (born 12 March 1987) is a Russian judoka.

Dmitrieva is the gold medalist of the 2017 Judo Grand Prix Antalya in the ‍–‍78 kg category.
