= 2016 Judo World Masters =

Judo competition

Judo 2016 Judo World Masters
- Venue: Lopez Mateo Sports Centre, Guadalajara
- Location: Guadalajara, Mexico
- Dates: 27–29 May 2016
- Competitors: 233 from 51 nations

Competition at external databases
- Links: IJF • EJU • JudoInside

The 2016 Judo World Masters was held in Guadalajara, Mexico, from 27 to 29 May 2016.

== Medal summary ==
=== Medal table ===
Rank	Nation	Gold	Silver	Bronze	Total
1	Japan (JPN)	5	0	2	7
2	Azerbaijan (AZE)	2	0	2	4
3	United States (USA)	2	0	0	2
4	Mongolia (MGL)	1	2	1	4
5	Netherlands (NED)	1	1	3	5
6	South Korea (KOR)	1	0	3	4
7	Cuba (CUB)	1	0	0	1
7	Romania (ROU)	1	0	0	1
9	France (FRA)	0	3	1	4
10	Russia (RUS)	0	2	1	3
11	Brazil (BRA)	0	2	0	2
12	China (CHN)	0	1	1	2
12	Israel (ISR)	0	1	1	2
14	Austria (AUT)	0	1	0	1
14	Belgium (BEL)	0	1	0	1
16	Sweden (SWE)	0	0	2	2
17	Bosnia and Herzegovina (BIH)	0	0	1	1
17	Colombia (COL)	0	0	1	1
17	Czech Republic (CZE)	0	0	1	1
17	Egypt (EGY)	0	0	1	1
17	Great Britain (GBR)	0	0	1	1
17	Greece (GRE)	0	0	1	1
17	Hungary (HUN)	0	0	1	1
17	Italy (ITA)	0	0	1	1
17	Slovenia (SLO)	0	0	1	1
17	Spain (ESP)	0	0	1	1
17	Ukraine (UKR)	0	0	1	1
Totals (27 entries)		14	14	28	56

=== Men's events ===
Event	Gold	Silver	Bronze
Extra-lightweight (-60 kg)	Orkhan Safarov; Azerbaijan	Vincent Limare; France	Kim Won-jin; South Korea
Extra-lightweight (-60 kg)	Orkhan Safarov; Azerbaijan	Vincent Limare; France	Dashdavaagiin Amartüvshin; Mongolia
Half-lightweight (-66 kg)	An Baul; South Korea	Davaadorjiin Tömörkhüleg; Mongolia	Golan Pollack; Israel
Half-lightweight (-66 kg)	An Baul; South Korea	Davaadorjiin Tömörkhüleg; Mongolia	Nijat Shikhalizada; Azerbaijan
Lightweight (-73 kg)	Soichi Hashimoto; Japan	Odbayar Ganbaatar; Mongolia	Rustam Orujov; Azerbaijan
Lightweight (-73 kg)	Soichi Hashimoto; Japan	Odbayar Ganbaatar; Mongolia	Denis Iartcev; Russia
Half-middleweight (-81 kg)	Travis Stevens; United States	Joachim Bottieau; Belgium	Roman Moustopoulos; Greece
Half-middleweight (-81 kg)	Travis Stevens; United States	Joachim Bottieau; Belgium	Mohamed Abdelaal; Egypt
Middleweight (-90 kg)	Mashu Baker; Japan	Khusen Khalmurzaev; Russia	Mihael Žgank; Slovenia
Middleweight (-90 kg)	Mashu Baker; Japan	Khusen Khalmurzaev; Russia	Marcus Nyman; Sweden
Half-heavyweight (-100 kg)	Elmar Gasimov; Azerbaijan	Cyrille Maret; France	Lukáš Krpálek; Czech Republic
Half-heavyweight (-100 kg)	Elmar Gasimov; Azerbaijan	Cyrille Maret; France	Martin Pacek; Sweden
Heavyweight (+100 kg)	Daniel Natea; Romania	Or Sasson; Israel	Hisayoshi Harasawa; Japan
Heavyweight (+100 kg)	Daniel Natea; Romania	Or Sasson; Israel	Roy Meyer; Netherlands

=== Women's events ===
Event	Gold	Silver	Bronze
Extra-lightweight (-48 kg)	Ami Kondo; Japan	Sarah Menezes; Brazil	Julia Figueroa; Spain
Extra-lightweight (-48 kg)	Ami Kondo; Japan	Sarah Menezes; Brazil	Maryna Cherniak; Ukraine
Half-lightweight (-52 kg)	Misato Nakamura; Japan	Natalia Kuziutina; Russia	Annabelle Euranie; France
Half-lightweight (-52 kg)	Misato Nakamura; Japan	Natalia Kuziutina; Russia	Odette Giuffrida; Italy
Lightweight (-57 kg)	Sumiya Dorjsuren; Mongolia	Helene Receveaux; France	Hedvig Karakas; Hungary
Lightweight (-57 kg)	Sumiya Dorjsuren; Mongolia	Helene Receveaux; France	Kim Jan-di; South Korea
Half-middleweight (-63 kg)	Miku Tashiro; Japan	Juul Franssen; Netherlands	Yang Junxia; China
Half-middleweight (-63 kg)	Miku Tashiro; Japan	Juul Franssen; Netherlands	Anicka van Emden; Netherlands
Middleweight (-70 kg)	Kim Polling; Netherlands	Bernadette Graf; Austria	Yuri Alvear; Colombia
Middleweight (-70 kg)	Kim Polling; Netherlands	Bernadette Graf; Austria	Kim Seong-yeon; South Korea
Half-heavyweight (-78 kg)	Kayla Harrison; United States	Mayra Aguiar; Brazil	Guusje Steenhuis; Netherlands
Half-heavyweight (-78 kg)	Kayla Harrison; United States	Mayra Aguiar; Brazil	Natalie Powell; Great Britain
Heavyweight (+78 kg)	Idalys Ortiz; Cuba	Ma Sisi; China	Kanae Yamabe; Japan
Heavyweight (+78 kg)	Idalys Ortiz; Cuba	Ma Sisi; China	Larisa Cerić; Bosnia and Herzegovina
