= Judo at the 2012 Summer Olympics – Women's 78 kg =

Women's judo 78 kg category at the Games of the XXX Olympiad
- Venue: ExCeL Exhibition Centre
- Date: 2 August 2012
- Competitors: 21 from 21 nations

Medalists
1st place, gold medalist(s)		Kayla Harrison	United States
2nd place, silver medalist(s)		Gemma Gibbons	Great Britain
3rd place, bronze medalist(s)		Audrey Tcheuméo	France
3rd place, bronze medalist(s)		Mayra Aguiar	Brazil

The women's 78 kg category in judo at the 2012 Olympic Games in London took place between 28 July and 2 August at the ExCeL Exhibition Centre.

The gold and silver medals were determined by a single-elimination tournament, with the winner of the final taking gold and the loser receiving silver. Judo events awarded two bronze medals. Quarter-final losers competed in a repechage match for the right to face a semi-final loser for a bronze medal (that is, the judokas defeated in quarter-finals 'A' and 'B' competed against each other, with the winner of that match facing the semi-final loser from the other half of the bracket).

Kayla Harrison, representing the United States, won the gold medal, defeating Great Britain's Gemma Gibbons in the final; Gibbons was awarded the silver medal.

== Results ==
The event took place on 2 August 2012, with the following results:

=== Finals ===
Semi-finals
Mayra Aguiar (BRA)	0000
Kayla Harrison (USA)	1010
Gemma Gibbons (GBR)	1000
Audrey Tcheuméo (FRA)	0000

Final
Kayla Harrison (USA)	0020
Gemma Gibbons (GBR)	0000

=== Repechages ===
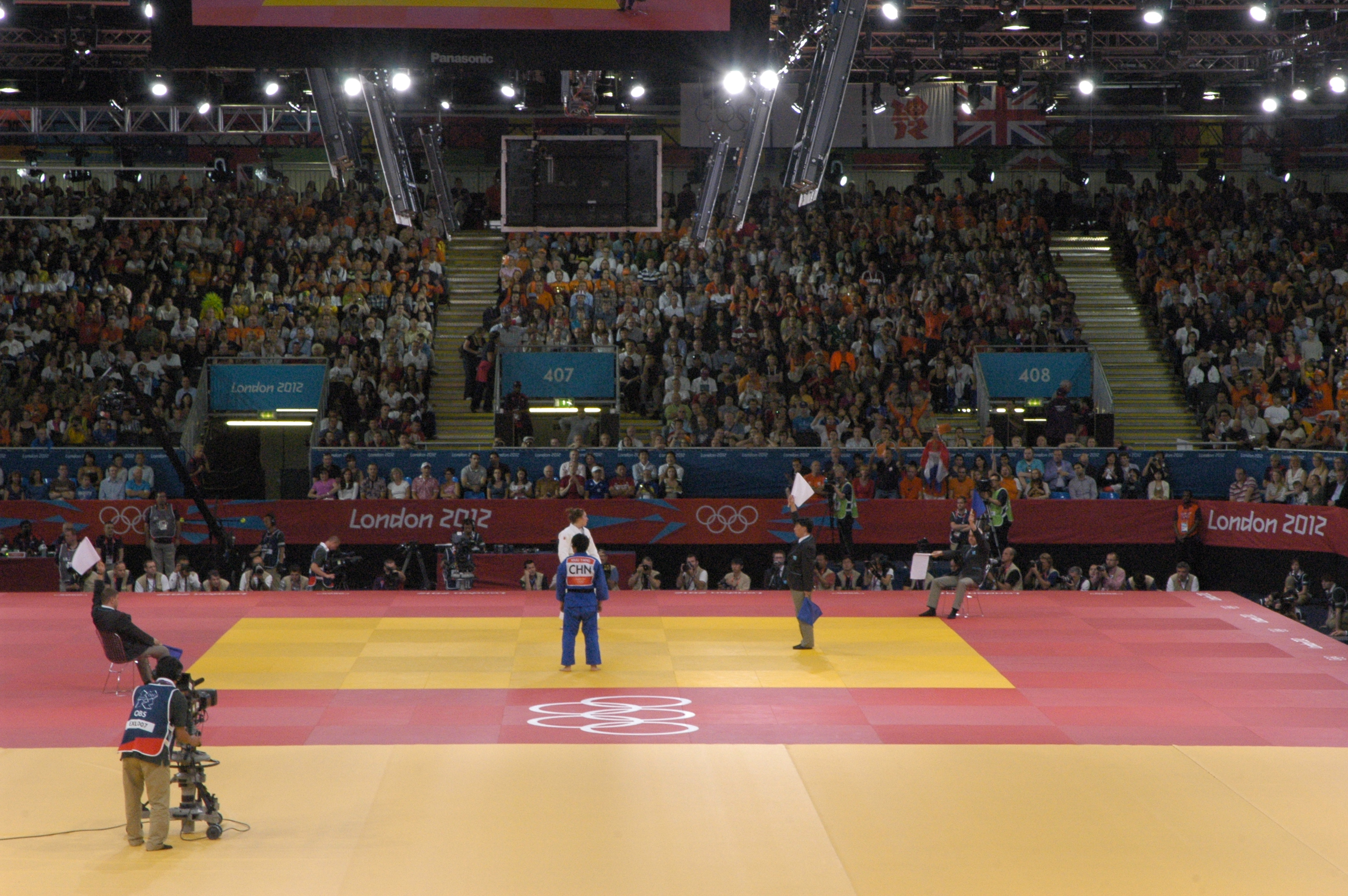
Marhinde Verkerk (NED) vs Yang Xiuli (CHN)

Repechage		Bronze medal
Daria Pogorzelec (POL)	0022
Abigél Joó (HUN)	1012	Abigél Joó (HUN)	0001
		Audrey Tcheuméo (FRA)	1000

Repechage		Bronze medal
Marhinde Verkerk (NED)	0000
Yang Xiuli (CHN)	0000	Marhinde Verkerk (NED)	0000
		Mayra Aguiar (BRA)	1000

=== Pool A ===
First round
A Velenšek (SLO)	0000
D Pogorzelec (POL)	0010

Second round
M Aguiar (BRA)	0200
H Mareghni (TUN)	0003
H Wollert (GER)	0000
D Pogorzelec (POL)	0200

Quarter-finals
M Aguiar (BRA)	0200
D Pogorzelec (POL)	0000

=== Pool B ===
First round
O Ntahonvukiye (BDI)	0000
A Koumba (GAB)	0200

Second round
K Harrison (USA)	1000
V Moskalyuk (RUS)	0000
A Joó (HUN)	1000
A Koumba (GAB)	0000

Quarter-finals
K Harrison (USA)	1010
A Joó (HUN)	0100

=== Pool C ===
First round
A Ogata (JPN)	0010
G-M Jeong (KOR)	0002
G Gibbons (GBR)	1000
Y Ramirez (POR)	0000

Second round
A Ogata (JPN)	0020
M Verkerk (NED)	0110
P Lkhamdegd (MGL)	0010
G Gibbons (GBR)	0021

Quarter-finals
M Verkerk (NED)	0000
G Gibbons (GBR)	0100

=== Pool D ===
First round
A Tcheuméo (FRA)	0010
A Cotton (CAN)	0001

Second round
A Tcheuméo (FRA)	1000
M Pryshchepa (UKR)	0000
X Yang (CHN)	1000
AA Aung (MYA)	0000

Quarter-finals
A Tcheuméo (FRA)	0101
X Yang (CHN)	0001
