= Ana Laura Portuondo Isasi =

Canadian judoka (born 1996)

Personal information
- National team: Canada
- Born: 9 March 1996 (age 30) Matanzas, Cuba
- Occupation: Judoka

Sport
- Country: Canada
- Sport: Judo
- Weight class: ‍–‍78 kg, +78 kg

Achievements and titles
- Olympic Games: R32 (2024)
- World Champ.: R16 (2017)
- Pan American Champ.: (2024)
Medal record
Women's judo
Representing Canada
Pan American Championships
Silver medal – second place	2024 Rio de Janeiro	+78 kg
Bronze medal – third place	2014 Guayaquil	‍–‍78 kg
Commonwealth Games
Bronze medal – third place	2014 Glasgow	78 kg
World Juniors Championships
Bronze medal – third place	2014 Fort Lauderdale	‍–‍78 kg

Profile at external databases
- IJF: 7731
- JudoInside.com: 79737
- Updated on 2 August 2024

Ana Laura Portuondo Isasi (Note: In this Spanish name, the first or paternal surname is Portuondo and the second or maternal family name is Isasi.) (born 9 March 1996) is a Canadian judoka. She competed at the 2024 Summer Olympics in Women's +78 kg.

She studied at Université de Montréal and Polytechnique Montréal.

She competed at the 2013 Jeux de la Francophonie, 2014 World Judo Juniors Championships, 2014 Commonwealth Games, and 2024 World Judo Championships. She left judo in 2017, because of a concussion, and a failed drug test. She won a bronze medal at the 2014 Pan American Judo Championships, and silver medal at the 2024 Pan American-Oceania Judo Championships .

== See also ==
- Judo in Quebec
- Judo in Canada
- List of Canadian judoka
