= 2011 Judo Grand Slam Tokyo =

Judo competition

Judo 2011 Judo Grand Slam Tokyo
- Location: Tokyo, Japan
- Dates: 9–11 December 2011
- Competitors: 398 from 62 nations

Competition at external databases
- Links: IJF • EJU • JudoInside

The 2011 Judo Grand Slam Tokyo was held in Tokyo, Japan from 9 to 11 December 2011.

== Medal summary ==
=== Men's events ===
Event	Gold	Silver	Bronze
Extra-lightweight (−60 kg)	Hirofumi Yamamoto (JPN)	Ryō Kawabata (JPN)	Hiroaki Hiraoka (JPN)
Extra-lightweight (−60 kg)	Hirofumi Yamamoto (JPN)	Ryō Kawabata (JPN)	Naohisa Takato (JPN)
Half-lightweight (−66 kg)	Tomofumi Takajo (JPN)	Musa Mogushkov (RUS)	Masashi Ebinuma (JPN)
Half-lightweight (−66 kg)	Tomofumi Takajo (JPN)	Musa Mogushkov (RUS)	Khashbaataryn Tsagaanbaatar (MGL)
Lightweight (−73 kg)	Hiroyuki Akimoto (JPN)	Mansur Isaev (RUS)	Riki Nakaya (JPN)
Lightweight (−73 kg)	Hiroyuki Akimoto (JPN)	Mansur Isaev (RUS)	Dirk Van Tichelt (BEL)
Half-middleweight (−81 kg)	Tomohiro Kawakami (JPN)	Leandro Guilheiro (BRA)	Sven Maresch (GER)
Half-middleweight (−81 kg)	Tomohiro Kawakami (JPN)	Leandro Guilheiro (BRA)	Keita Nagashima (JPN)
Middleweight (−90 kg)	Masashi Nishiyama (JPN)	Asley González (CUB)	Kirill Voprosov (RUS)
Middleweight (−90 kg)	Masashi Nishiyama (JPN)	Asley González (CUB)	Lee Kyu-won (KOR)
Half-heavyweight (−100 kg)	Sergei Samoilovich (RUS)	Hwang Hee-tae (KOR)	Takamasa Anai (JPN)
Half-heavyweight (−100 kg)	Sergei Samoilovich (RUS)	Hwang Hee-tae (KOR)	Irakli Tsirekidze (GEO)
Heavyweight (+100 kg)	Alexander Mikhaylin (RUS)	Cho Gu-ham (KOR)	Rafael Silva (BRA)
Heavyweight (+100 kg)	Alexander Mikhaylin (RUS)	Cho Gu-ham (KOR)	Abdullo Tangriev (UZB)

=== Women's events ===
Event	Gold	Silver	Bronze
Extra-lightweight (−48 kg)	Haruna Asami (JPN)	Tomoko Fukumi (JPN)	Jeong Bo-kyeong (KOR)
Extra-lightweight (−48 kg)	Haruna Asami (JPN)	Tomoko Fukumi (JPN)	Charline Van Snick (BEL)
Half-lightweight (−52 kg)	Takumi Miyakawa (JPN)	Priscilla Gneto (FRA)	Yanet Bermoy (CUB)
Half-lightweight (−52 kg)	Takumi Miyakawa (JPN)	Priscilla Gneto (FRA)	Yuki Hashimoto (JPN)
Lightweight (−57 kg)	Kaori Matsumoto (JPN)	Aiko Sato (JPN)	Anzu Yamamoto (JPN)
Lightweight (−57 kg)	Kaori Matsumoto (JPN)	Aiko Sato (JPN)	Rafaela Silva (BRA)
Half-middleweight (−63 kg)	Urška Žolnir (SLO)	Yoshie Ueno (JPN)	Miki Tanaka (JPN)
Half-middleweight (−63 kg)	Urška Žolnir (SLO)	Yoshie Ueno (JPN)	Elisabeth Willeboordse (NED)
Middleweight (−70 kg)	Tomoe Ueno (JPN)	Cecilia Blanco (ESP)	Katarzyna Kłys (POL)
Middleweight (−70 kg)	Tomoe Ueno (JPN)	Cecilia Blanco (ESP)	Haruka Tachimoto (JPN)
Half-heavyweight (−78 kg)	Akari Ogata (JPN)	Kayla Harrison (USA)	Mayra Aguiar (BRA)
Half-heavyweight (−78 kg)	Akari Ogata (JPN)	Kayla Harrison (USA)	Heide Wollert (GER)
Heavyweight (+78 kg)	Mika Sugimoto (JPN)	Megumi Tachimoto (JPN)	Kim Na-young (KOR)
Heavyweight (+78 kg)	Mika Sugimoto (JPN)	Megumi Tachimoto (JPN)	Lucija Polavder (SLO)

Source Results

=== Medal table ===
* Host nation (Japan)

Rank	Nation	Gold	Silver	Bronze	Total
1	Japan (JPN)*	11	5	10	26
2	Russia (RUS)	2	2	1	5
3	Slovenia (SLO)	1	0	1	2
4	South Korea (KOR)	0	2	3	5
5	Brazil (BRA)	0	1	3	4
6	Cuba (CUB)	0	1	1	2
7	France (FRA)	0	1	0	1
7	Spain (ESP)	0	1	0	1
7	United States (USA)	0	1	0	1
10	Belgium (BEL)	0	0	2	2
10	Germany (GER)	0	0	2	2
12	Georgia (GEO)	0	0	1	1
12	Mongolia (MGL)	0	0	1	1
12	Netherlands (NED)	0	0	1	1
12	Poland (POL)	0	0	1	1
12	Uzbekistan (UZB)	0	0	1	1
Totals (16 entries)		14	14	28	56
