= 2013 Judo Grand Slam Moscow =

Judo competition

Judo 2013 Judo Grand Slam Moscow
- Location: Moscow, Russia
- Dates: 20–21 July 2013
- Competitors: 295 from 40 nations

Competition at external databases
- Links: IJF • JudoInside

The 2013 Judo Grand Slam Moscow was held in Moscow, Russia, from 20 to 21 July 2013.

== Medal summary ==
=== Men's events ===
Event	Gold	Silver	Bronze
Extra-lightweight (−60 kg)	Amiran Papinashvili (GEO)	Felipe Kitadai (BRA)	Hovhannes Davtyan (ARM)
Extra-lightweight (−60 kg)	Amiran Papinashvili (GEO)	Felipe Kitadai (BRA)	Ilgar Mushkiyev (AZE)
Half-lightweight (−66 kg)	Charles Chibana (BRA)	Colin Oates (GBR)	Mirzohid Farmonov (UZB)
Half-lightweight (−66 kg)	Charles Chibana (BRA)	Colin Oates (GBR)	Luiz Revite (BRA)
Lightweight (−73 kg)	Dirk Van Tichelt (BEL)	Denis Iartsev (RUS)	Navruz Jurakobilov (UZB)
Lightweight (−73 kg)	Dirk Van Tichelt (BEL)	Denis Iartsev (RUS)	Zebeda Rekhviashvili (GEO)
Half-middleweight (−81 kg)	Sven Maresch (GER)	Vitalii Dudchyk (UKR)	Stanislav Semenov (RUS)
Half-middleweight (−81 kg)	Sven Maresch (GER)	Vitalii Dudchyk (UKR)	Ivan Vorobev (RUS)
Middleweight (−90 kg)	Grigorii Sulemin (RUS)	Erkin Doniyorov (UZB)	Alexandr Jurečka (CZE)
Middleweight (−90 kg)	Grigorii Sulemin (RUS)	Erkin Doniyorov (UZB)	Hirotaka Kato (JPN)
Half-heavyweight (−100 kg)	Javad Mahjoub (IRI)	Ramziddin Sayidov (UZB)	Luciano Corrêa (BRA)
Half-heavyweight (−100 kg)	Javad Mahjoub (IRI)	Ramziddin Sayidov (UZB)	Dimitri Peters (GER)
Heavyweight (+100 kg)	Robert Zimmermann (GER)	Andreas Tölzer (GER)	Faïcel Jaballah (TUN)
Heavyweight (+100 kg)	Robert Zimmermann (GER)	Andreas Tölzer (GER)	Iurii Krakovetskii (KGZ)

=== Women's events ===
Event	Gold	Silver	Bronze
Extra-lightweight (−48 kg)	Sarah Menezes (BRA)	Otgontsetseg Galbadrakh (MGL)	Lusine Avakyan (RUS)
Extra-lightweight (−48 kg)	Sarah Menezes (BRA)	Otgontsetseg Galbadrakh (MGL)	Monica Ungureanu (ROU)
Half-lightweight (−52 kg)	Jaana Sundberg (FIN)	Érika Miranda (BRA)	Gili Cohen (ISR)
Half-lightweight (−52 kg)	Jaana Sundberg (FIN)	Érika Miranda (BRA)	Roni Schwartz (ISR)
Lightweight (−57 kg)	Miryam Roper (GER)	Ketleyn Quadros (BRA)	Sabrina Filzmoser (AUT)
Lightweight (−57 kg)	Miryam Roper (GER)	Ketleyn Quadros (BRA)	Rafaela Silva (BRA)
Half-middleweight (−63 kg)	Yarden Gerbi (ISR)	Anicka van Emden (NED)	Baldorjyn Möngönchimeg (MGL)
Half-middleweight (−63 kg)	Yarden Gerbi (ISR)	Anicka van Emden (NED)	Martyna Trajdos (GER)
Middleweight (−70 kg)	Bernadette Graf (AUT)	Chizuru Arai (JPN)	Linda Bolder (NED)
Middleweight (−70 kg)	Bernadette Graf (AUT)	Chizuru Arai (JPN)	Laura Vargas Koch (GER)
Half-heavyweight (−78 kg)	Abigél Joó (HUN)	Mayra Aguiar (BRA)	Gemma Gibbons (GBR)
Half-heavyweight (−78 kg)	Abigél Joó (HUN)	Mayra Aguiar (BRA)	Marhinde Verkerk (NED)
Heavyweight (+78 kg)	Maria Suelen Altheman (BRA)	Kanae Yamabe (JPN)	Sarah Adlington (GBR)
Heavyweight (+78 kg)	Maria Suelen Altheman (BRA)	Kanae Yamabe (JPN)	Jasmin Grabowski (GER)

Source Results

=== Medal table ===
* Host nation (Russia)

Rank	Nation	Gold	Silver	Bronze	Total
1	Brazil (BRA)	3	4	3	10
2	Germany (GER)	3	1	4	8
3	Russia (RUS)*	1	1	3	5
4	Israel (ISR)	1	0	2	3
5	Austria (AUT)	1	0	1	2
5	Georgia (GEO)	1	0	1	2
7	Belgium (BEL)	1	0	0	1
7	Finland (FIN)	1	0	0	1
7	Hungary (HUN)	1	0	0	1
7	Iran (IRI)	1	0	0	1
11	Uzbekistan (UZB)	0	2	2	4
12	Japan (JPN)	0	2	1	3
13	Great Britain (GBR)	0	1	2	3
13	Netherlands (NED)	0	1	2	3
15	Mongolia (MGL)	0	1	1	2
16	Ukraine (UKR)	0	1	0	1
17	Armenia (ARM)	0	0	1	1
17	Azerbaijan (AZE)	0	0	1	1
17	Czech Republic (CZE)	0	0	1	1
17	Kyrgyzstan (KGZ)	0	0	1	1
17	Romania (ROU)	0	0	1	1
17	Tunisia (TUN)	0	0	1	1
Totals (22 entries)		14	14	28	56
