= Gemma Gibbons =

British judoka (born 1987)

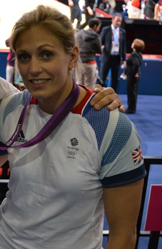

Personal information
- Full name: Gemma Jeanette Gibbons
- Born: 6 January 1987 (age 39) Greenwich, London, England
- Home town: Edinburgh, Scotland
- Occupation: Judoka
- Height: 1.73 m (5 ft 8 in)

Sport
- Country: Great Britain
- Sport: Judo
- Weight class: –78 kg
- Club: Metro Judo Club; British Judo Performance Institute; UEL Sports

Achievements and titles
- Olympic Games: (silver) (2012)
- World Champ.: 7th (2015)
- European Champ.: 5th (2016)
- Commonwealth Games: (silver) (2014)
Medal record
Women's judo
Representing Great Britain
Olympic Games
Silver medal – second place	2012 London	‍–‍78 kg
IJF Grand Slam
Bronze medal – third place	2013 Moscow	‍–‍78 kg
Bronze medal – third place	2015 Tokyo	‍–‍78 kg
IJF Grand Prix
Gold medal – first place	2013 Düsseldorf	‍–‍78 kg
Gold medal – first place	2015 Ulaanbaatar	‍–‍78 kg
Bronze medal – third place	2013 Rijeka	‍–‍78 kg
Bronze medal – third place	2015 Tashkent	‍–‍78 kg
Bronze medal – third place	2015 Qingdao	‍–‍78 kg
Bronze medal – third place	2015 Jeju	‍–‍78 kg
European U23 Championships
Bronze medal – third place	2009 Antalya	‍–‍70 kg
Summer Universiade
Bronze medal – third place	2009 Belgrade	‍–‍70 kg
Representing England
Commonwealth Games
Silver medal – second place	2014 Glasgow	‍–‍78 kg

Profile at external databases
- IJF: 1920
- JudoInside.com: 22729
- Updated on 28 May 2023

Gemma Jeanette Gibbons (born 6 January 1987) is a British judoka. Competing in the women's ‍–‍70 kg category, she has represented England and Great Britain at Junior, U-23, 'B' and Senior level.

== Early and personal life ==
Born in Charlton, London, Gibbons began practising Judo at six years of age with the Metro Judo Club in Blackheath, London. She attended Westwood College (now Harris Academy Falconwood). Gibbons represented Greenwich in judo at the London Youth Games. She is also the 2013 patron for London Youth Games and was inducted into the London Youth Games Hall of Fame in 2012.

Gemma studied at the London Leisure College, the sports, leisure and travel department of Greenwich Community College, between 2004 and 2006 on 'BTEC National Award' and 'BTEC National Certificate in Sports and Exercise Science' courses. Starting her degree in Sports Performance at the University of Bath, Gibbons continued to practice Judo, winning a Full Blues award in 2007 from the university.

In June 2013 she married Scottish judoka Euan Burton at The Caves in Edinburgh. The couple also now reside in the city. She subsequently put her studies for a physical education teaching degree on hold, to concentrate on working towards competing at the 2016 Summer Olympics in Rio de Janeiro.

Natalie Powell was selected ahead of Gibbons to represent GB at the 2016 Summer Olympics.

== Career ==
Gibbons started training with the Metro Judo Club, and after training with UELSports at the University of East London, is now a member of the British Judo Performance Institute.

Gibbons won the BBC Radio London Young Sports Woman of the Year Award 2006. Shortly after graduating, she won bronze in the under-70 kg class at the 2009 World University Games.

Kate Howey, Performance Development Squad Coach for 2012 stated that Gibbons "is one of our best medal hopes for judo" in the 2012 London Olympic and Paralympic Games. In 2012 and ranked 42nd in the world at the time, at the 2012 London Olympics Gibbons won the silver medal, losing to Kayla Harrison in the -78 kg event. Television coverage of the Olympics showed footage of a teary-eyed Gibbons looking upwards and mouthing "I love you mum" after winning her semifinal match, thus guaranteeing a medal. Gibbons had lost her mother to leukaemia years earlier. The moment became an iconic image of the Games, featuring by the media in several compilations and montages connected with the event.

== Achievements ==
Year	Date	Tournament	Place	Weight class
2003		British National Junior Age Championships	1st	
2004		Junior European Championships	5th	
2004		Junior A (Austria)	3rd	
2004		Junior A Germany	3rd	
2004		Junior A Russia	3rd	
2004		Senior British Closed	2nd	
2004		Junior British Open	1st	
2004		National (British) U-18	1st	
2005		Junior British Closed	1st	
2005		Junior British Open	1st	
2005		Arlon Junior B	1st	
2005		Junior A Germany	3rd	
2005		Junior A Poland	3rd	
2005		Junior A France	3rd	
2005		U-23 European Championships	7th	
2005		Junior European Championships	5th	
2005		Matsumae Cup	2nd	
2006		Elite Performance Junior Trials	1st	
2006		World University Games	5th	
2006		German Super World Cup	5th	
2007		Slovenian 'B' Tournament	3rd	
2007		Turkish 'B' Tournament	2nd	
2007		World University Games	7th	
2007		Tallinn World Cup	7th	
2008		GB World Cup	3rd	
2008		U-23 European Championships	5th	
2009		English Senior Open	2nd	
2009		Tre Torri International	3rd	
2009		World University Games	3rd	
2009		Swedish Open	2nd	
2009		U-23 European Championships	3rd	
2010		Sofia World Cup	5th	
2010		British Open	7th	
2010		Orenburg European Cup	1st	
2012		Games of the XXX Olympiad, London	2nd	
2012		British National Judo Championships	1st	

== See also ==
- Judo in the United Kingdom
