= Diana Chalá =

Ecuadorian judoka (born 1982)

Personal information
- Full name: Diana Chalá Zamora
- Born: May 20, 1982 (age 44)
- Occupation: Judoka

Sport
- Sport: Judo
Medal record
Women's judo
Representing Ecuador
Pan American Games
Bronze medal – third place	2003 Santo Domingo	Middleweight
South American Games
Silver medal – second place	2002 Rio de Janeiro	Middleweight
Silver medal – second place	2006 Buenos Aires	Middleweight

Profile at external databases
- JudoInside.com: 16059

Diana Chalá Zamora (born May 20, 1982) is a female judoka from Ecuador, who won the bronze medal in the women's middleweight division (– 70 kg) at the 2003 Pan American Games in Santo Domingo, alongside Dulce Piña of the Dominican Republic.
