= Vera Moskalyuk =

Russian judoka (born 1981)

Personal information
- Born: 10 November 1981 (age 44)
- Occupation: Judoka

Sport
- Country: Russia
- Sport: Judo
- Weight class: –78 kg

Achievements and titles
- Olympic Games: 9th (2004)
- World Champ.: 7th (2010)
- European Champ.: (gold) (2006)
Medal record
Women's judo
Representing Russia
European Championships
Gold medal – first place	2006 Tampere	–78 kg
Silver medal – second place	2007 Belgrade	–78 kg
Silver medal – second place	2008 Lisbon	–78 kg
IJF Grand Slam
Bronze medal – third place	2012 Moscow	–78 kg
IJF Grand Prix
Gold medal – first place	2009 Tunis	–78 kg

Profile at external databases
- IJF: 371
- JudoInside.com: 11878
- Updated on 16 November 2022

Vera Sergeyevna Moskalyuk (Russian: Вера Сергеевна Москалюк; born 10 November 1981 in Zhytomyr, Ukraine) is a Ukrainian-born Russian judoka. She competed in three consecutive Summer Olympics. In 2004 in Athens in the -78 kg event she was eliminated in her first match by Liu Xia. In Beijing in 2008 she competed again at -78 kg and lost her first match to Esther San Miguel. Finally in London in 2012, still in the -78 kg event she was defeated by Kayla Harrison.

Moskalyuk has won a gold medal (2006) and two silver medals (2007, 2008) at the European Judo Championships.
