= Natalie Powell =

Welsh judoka (born 1990)

Personal information
- Full name: Natalie Anne Powell
- Nationality: British (Welsh)
- Born: 16 October 1990 (age 35) Merthyr Tydfil, Wales
- Occupation: Judoka

Sport
- Sport: Judo
- Weight class: ‍–‍78 kg
- Retired: September 2024

Achievements and titles
- Olympic Games: 7th (2016)
- World Champ.: (bronze) (2017)
- European Champ.: (bronze) (2016, 2017, 2018)
- Commonwealth Games: (gold) (2014)
Medal record
Women's judo
Representing Great Britain
World Championships
Bronze medal – third place	2017 Budapest	‍–‍78 kg
European Championships
Bronze medal – third place	2016 Kazan	‍–‍78 kg
Bronze medal – third place	2017 Warsaw	‍–‍78 kg
Bronze medal – third place	2018 Tel Aviv	‍–‍78 kg
World Masters
Silver medal – second place	2015 Rabat	‍–‍78 kg
Bronze medal – third place	2016 Guadalajara	‍–‍78 kg
Bronze medal – third place	2018 Guangzhou	‍–‍78 kg
IJF Grand Slam
Gold medal – first place	2017 Abu Dhabi	‍–‍78 kg
Silver medal – second place	2017 Ekaterinburg	‍–‍78 kg
Silver medal – second place	2018 Abu Dhabi	‍–‍78 kg
Silver medal – second place	2019 Brasilia	‍–‍78 kg
Silver medal – second place	2022 Abu Dhabi	‍–‍78 kg
Bronze medal – third place	2016 Paris	‍–‍78 kg
Bronze medal – third place	2018 Düsseldorf	‍–‍78 kg
Bronze medal – third place	2021 Abu Dhabi	‍–‍78 kg
Bronze medal – third place	2022 Tbilisi	‍–‍78 kg
IJF Grand Prix
Gold medal – first place	2014 Astana	‍–‍78 kg
Gold medal – first place	2015 Tashkent	‍–‍78 kg
Gold medal – first place	2020 Tel Aviv	‍–‍78 kg
Gold medal – first place	2022 Zagreb	‍–‍78 kg
Silver medal – second place	2012 Abu Dhabi	‍–‍78 kg
Silver medal – second place	2013 Abu Dhabi	‍–‍78 kg
Silver medal – second place	2014 Samsun	‍–‍78 kg
Silver medal – second place	2015 Samsun	‍–‍78 kg
Silver medal – second place	2017 Cancún	‍–‍78 kg
Bronze medal – third place	2013 Samsun	‍–‍78 kg
Bronze medal – third place	2013 Miami	‍–‍78 kg
Bronze medal – third place	2013 Rijeka	‍–‍78 kg
Bronze medal – third place	2014 Düsseldorf	‍–‍78 kg
Bronze medal – third place	2014 Budapest	‍–‍78 kg
Bronze medal – third place	2014 Zagreb	‍–‍78 kg
Bronze medal – third place	2014 Tashkent	‍–‍78 kg
Bronze medal – third place	2016 Tbilisi	‍–‍78 kg
Bronze medal – third place	2018 Antalya	‍–‍78 kg
Bronze medal – third place	2018 Budapest	‍–‍78 kg
Bronze medal – third place	2019 Budapest	‍–‍78 kg
Bronze medal – third place	2019 Tashkent	‍–‍78 kg
Representing Wales
Commonwealth Games
Gold medal – first place	2014 Glasgow	‍–‍78 kg
Silver medal – second place	2022 Birmingham	‍–‍78 kg

Profile at external databases
- IJF: 10332
- JudoInside.com: 48367
- Updated on 4 November 2024

Natalie Anne Powell (born 16 October 1990) is a Welsh retired judoka. She competed for Wales in the women's 78 kg event at the 2014 Commonwealth Games where she won a gold medal.

== Judo career ==
Powell is a four times champion of Great Britain, winning the half-heavyweight division at the British Judo Championships in 2012, 2013, 2014 and 2016.

In 2017, she became the first female British judoka to be ranked number one in the world, which she accomplished by winning a gold medal at the Abu Dhabi judo Grand Slam 2017. Earlier that year she won a bronze medal at the European Championships. In May 2019, Powell was selected to compete at the 2019 European Games in Minsk, Belarus.

In 2021, she competed in the women's 78 kg event at the 2020 Summer Olympics in Tokyo, Japan.

== Personal life ==
Natalie is openly lesbian.
