= Bikok =

Coordinates: 3.6420°N 11.5319°E

- Commune and town
- Interactive map of Bikok
- Country: Cameroon
- Time zone: UTC+1 (WAT)

Bikok is a town and commune in Cameroon.

== See also ==
- Communes of Cameroon
