= Marie-Claire Nnana =

- Occupations: Journalist, Director General

Marie-Claire Nnana is a Cameroonian journalist, and the Director General of the Sopécam (Société de presse et d'éditions du Cameroun).

== Early life and education ==
Nnana graduated as a journalist from the École supérieure de journalisme de Lille.

== Career ==
In 2002, Nnana was appointed as the Director General of the Sopécam.

Nnana writes editorials for the newspaper Cameroon Tribune.

When the diskette containing the next day's edition of the private newspaper Mutations, titled "L'après-Biya," was seized by the gendarmerie in the workshops of Sopécam on the night of April 13, 2003, she stated: "We have an obligation to protect our interests."

Nnana has been accused by some journalists of promoting tribalism in her editorials.

== Bibliography ==
- Loi N° 99/016 du 22 décembre 1999 portant statut général des établissements publics et des entreprises du secteur public et parapublic (PDF).
