= Akari Ogata =

Japanese judoka (born 1990)

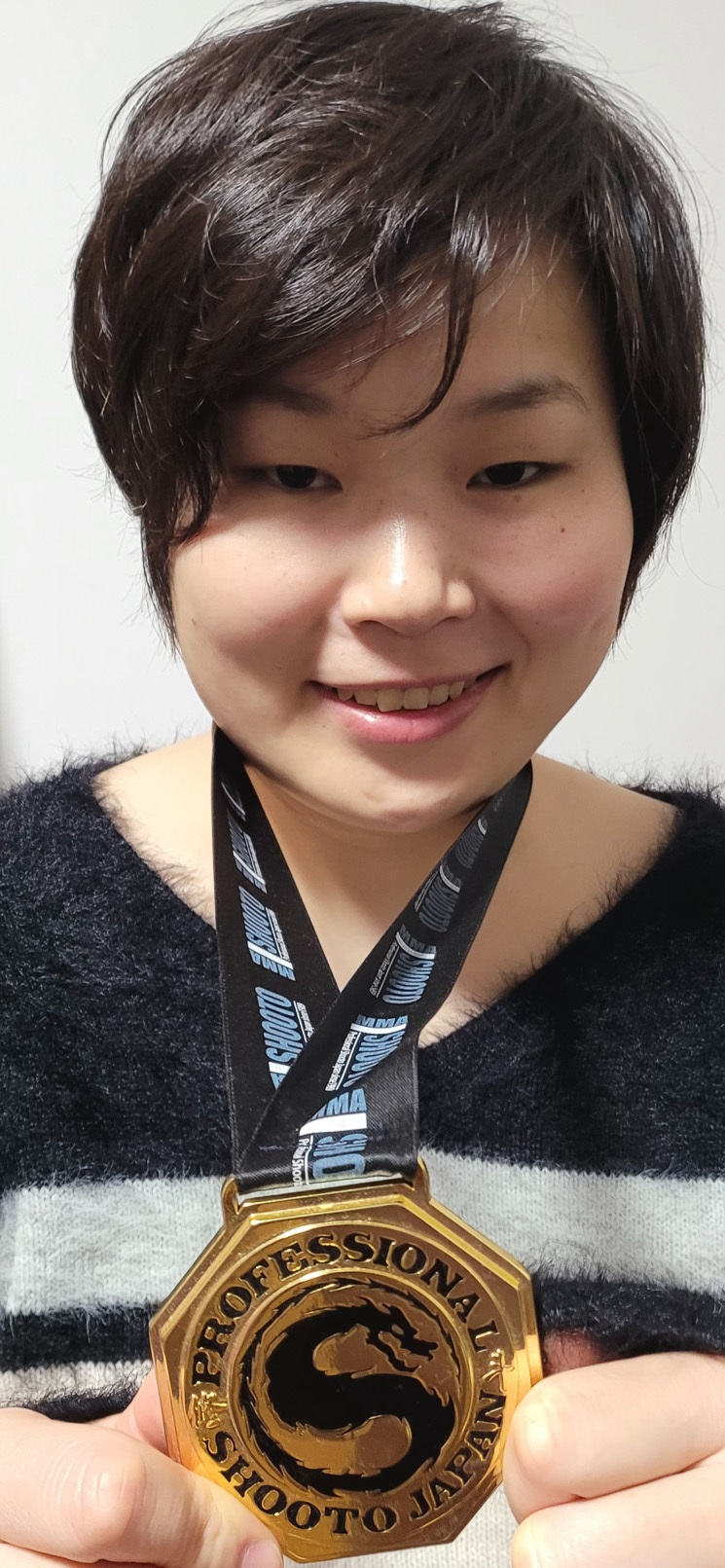
- Akari Ogata with her first Shooto medal

Personal information
- Born: 24 September 1990 (age 35)
- Occupation: Judoka

Sport
- Country: Japan
- Sport: Judo
- Weight class: ‍–‍78 kg

Achievements and titles
- Olympic Games: R16 (2012)
- World Champ.: (silver) (2011)
- Asian Champ.: (silver) (2010)
Medal record
Women's judo
Representing Japan
World Championships
Silver medal – second place	2011 Paris	‍–‍78 kg
Bronze medal – third place	2010 Tokyo	‍–‍78 kg
Asian Games
Silver medal – second place	2010 Guangzhou	‍–‍78 kg
World Masters
Bronze medal – third place	2011 Baku	‍–‍78 kg
Bronze medal – third place	2012 Almaty	‍–‍78 kg
IJF Grand Slam
Gold medal – first place	2009 Tokyo	‍–‍78 kg
Gold medal – first place	2010 Paris	‍–‍78 kg
Gold medal – first place	2011 Moscow	‍–‍78 kg
Gold medal – first place	2011 Tokyo	‍–‍78 kg
Silver medal – second place	2010 Rio de Janeiro	‍–‍78 kg
Silver medal – second place	2012 Tokyo	‍–‍78 kg
Silver medal – second place	2013 Paris	‍–‍78 kg
Silver medal – second place	2015 Baku	‍–‍78 kg
Bronze medal – third place	2010 Tokyo	‍–‍78 kg
Bronze medal – third place	2012 Paris	‍–‍78 kg
Bronze medal – third place	2015 Paris	‍–‍78 kg
IJF Grand Prix
Gold medal – first place	2010 Rotterdam	‍–‍78 kg
Bronze medal – third place	2015 Ulaanbaatar	‍–‍78 kg
World Juniors Championships
Gold medal – first place	2009 Paris	‍–‍78 kg

Profile at external databases
- IJF: 1352
- JudoInside.com: 49293
- Updated on 17 July 2023

Akari Ogata (緒方 亜香里, Ogata Akari; born 24 September 1990) is a Japanese judoka.

Ogata started taking part in karate at the age of 7 and she became national junior karate champion when she was 10, but at age 13, she quit karate and started to practice judo.

Ogata won a bronze medal in the half-heavyweight (78 kg) division at the 2010 World Judo Championships, and silver a year later. She has also won silver at the 2010 Asian Games. Ogata had previously won the 2009 World Juniors Championships in that weight division.

Ogata's favorite techniques are uchimata, ōuchi gari and sankaku-jime.

She started her MMA career in 2022 with a fight in the Japanese MMA league Shooto, during which time she fought once and won by referee stoppage. After that she competed in a Shooto Colors grappling event and won by Kimura armlock. As of early 2024 she has been competing in ONE Championship. Her standing in ONE Championship is 1 win by TKO.

Ogata works as a Judo therapist.

== Mixed martial arts record ==
Professional record breakdown
1 match	1 win	0 losses
By knockout	1	0

Res.	Record	Opponent	Method	Event	Date	Round	Time	Location	Notes
Win	1–0	Khozhiniso Komoldinova	TKO (punches)	ONE Friday Fights 57	March 29, 2024	3	1:16	Bangkok, Thailand	Catchweight (163 lb) bout.
