= Jina Devi Chongtham =

Indian judoka

Jina Devi Chongtham (born 3 February 1987) is an Indian judoka. She competed in the half-heavyweight (78 kg) class at the 2014 Commonwealth Games in Glasgow.
