= Heide Wollert =

German judoka (born 1982)

Personal information
- Born: 16 May 1982 (age 44)
- Occupation: Judoka

Sport
- Country: Germany
- Sport: Judo
- Weight class: ‍–‍70 kg, ‍–‍78 kg

Achievements and titles
- Olympic Games: 7th (2008)
- World Champ.: (bronze) (2009)
- European Champ.: (gold) (2008)
Medal record
Women's judo
Representing Germany
World Championships
Bronze medal – third place	2009 Rotterdam	‍–‍78 kg
European Championships
Gold medal – first place	2008 Lisbon	‍–‍78 kg
Silver medal – second place	2003 Düsseldorf	‍–‍70 kg
Silver medal – second place	2006 Tampere	‍–‍70 kg
Bronze medal – third place	2009 Tbilisi	‍–‍78 kg
IJF Grand Slam
Bronze medal – third place	2009 Rio de Janeiro	‍–‍78 kg
Bronze medal – third place	2009 Tokyo	‍–‍78 kg
Bronze medal – third place	2011 Tokyo	‍–‍78 kg
Bronze medal – third place	2014 Baku	‍–‍70 kg
IJF Grand Prix
Gold medal – first place	2010 Düsseldorf	‍–‍78 kg
Silver medal – second place	2010 Tunis	‍–‍78 kg
Silver medal – second place	2011 Düsseldorf	‍–‍78 kg
Silver medal – second place	2011 Amsterdam	‍–‍78 kg
Bronze medal – third place	2012 Düsseldorf	‍–‍78 kg

Profile at external databases
- IJF: 603
- JudoInside.com: 9074
- Updated on 5 September 2023

Heide Wollert (born 16 May 1982 in Halle, Saxony-Anhalt) is a German judoka. She competes in the ‍–‍78 kg weight-class. She competed at the 2008 Summer Olympics, finishing in 7th. At the 2012 Olympics, she was knocked out in the second round.
