= Abigél Joó =

Hungarian judoka (born 1990)

Personal information
- Nationality: Hungarian
- Born: 6 August 1990 (age 35) Budapest, Hungary
- Occupation: Judoka

Sport
- Country: Hungary
- Sport: Judo
- Weight class: –70 kg / –78 kg

Achievements and titles
- Olympic Games: 5th (2012)
- World Champ.: 7th (2011)
- European Champ.: (gold) (2010, 2012)
Medal record
Women's judo
Representing Hungary
European Championships
Gold medal – first place	2010 Vienna	–78 kg
Gold medal – first place	2012 Chelyabinsk	–78 kg
Bronze medal – third place	2009 Miskolc	Women's team
Bronze medal – third place	2013 Budapest	–78 kg
Bronze medal – third place	2014 Montpellier	–78 kg
Bronze medal – third place	2017 Warsaw	–78 kg
World Masters
Silver medal – second place	2013 Tyumen	–78 kg
Bronze medal – third place	2011 Baku	–78 kg
IJF Grand Slam
Gold medal – first place	2013 Baku	–78 kg
Gold medal – first place	2013 Moscow	–78 kg
Silver medal – second place	2011 Moscow	–78 kg
Bronze medal – third place	2010 Moscow	–78 kg
Bronze medal – third place	2011 Paris	–78 kg
Bronze medal – third place	2014 Abu Dhabi	–78 kg
Bronze medal – third place	2015 Abu Dhabi	–78 kg
Bronze medal – third place	2017 Baku	–78 kg
Bronze medal – third place	2017 Ekaterinburg	–78 kg
IJF Grand Prix
Gold medal – first place	2011 Baku	–78 kg
Gold medal – first place	2011 Abu Dhabi	–78 kg
Gold medal – first place	2016 Havana	–78 kg
Gold medal – first place	2016 Zagreb	–78 kg
Gold medal – first place	2016 Tashkent	–78 kg
Silver medal – second place	2014 Zagreb	–78 kg
Bronze medal – third place	2014 Budapest	–78 kg
Bronze medal – third place	2014 Ulaanbaatar	–78 kg
Bronze medal – third place	2015 Düsseldorf	–78 kg
Bronze medal – third place	2015 Zagreb	–78 kg
Bronze medal – third place	2016 Budapest	–78 kg
European U23 Championships
Gold medal – first place	2009 Antalya	–70 kg
Gold medal – first place	2010 Sarajevo	–78 kg
Gold medal – first place	2011 Tyumen	–78 kg
Gold medal – first place	2012 Prague	–78 kg
Bronze medal – third place	2007 Salzburg	–63 kg
World Juniors Championships
Bronze medal – third place	2008 Bangkok	–70 kg
Bronze medal – third place	2009 Paris	–70 kg
European Junior Championships
Gold medal – first place	2008 Warsaw	–70 kg
Gold medal – first place	2009 Yerevan	–70 kg
Bronze medal – third place	2007 Prague	–63 kg
European Cadet Championships
Bronze medal – third place	2006 Miskolc	–63 kg
Summer Universiade
Gold medal – first place	2013 Kazan	–78 kg

Profile at external databases
- IJF: 1086
- JudoInside.com: 38707
- Updated on 11 November 2022

Abigél Joó (born 6 August 1990 in Budapest, Hungary) is a Hungarian judoka.

Joó won the 2010 European Championships in the -78 kg event, and regained her title in 2012. Since then, she has won three bronze medals in 2013, 2014 and 2017. As a junior, she had won bronze medals at the world junior championships in 2008 and 2009, in the 70 kg division. At European level, she won the European junior title at -70 kg in 2008 and 2009, having won the bronze medal in 2007 in the -63 kg division. She also won four European under-23 titles.

She competed at the 2012 Summer Olympics in the -78 kg event. She beat Audrey Koumba in her first match, before losing to Kayla Harrison. As Harrison reached the final, Joó was entered into the repechage. In the repechage, she beat Daria Pogorzelec before losing her bronze medal match to Audrey Tcheuméo. During her match against Harrison, Joó tore knee ligaments, restricting her performance.

Joó competed in the same division at the 2016 Summer Olympics. She won her first match against Pürevjargalyn Lkhamdegd, then beat Mami Umeki before losing to Harrison in quarterfinals. Because Harrison again reached the final, Joó was entered into the repechage, where she lost her first repechage match to Yalennis Castillo.

In 2017, she married shortly after the European championships and is now sometimes under the name of Abigél Erdelyi-Joo. In 2017, she also won her ninth Hungarian national title.
