= Catherine Roberge =

Canadian judoka (born 1982)

Personal information
- Nationality: Canada
- Born: 8 February 1982 (age 44) Charlesbourg, Quebec
- Occupation: Judoka

Sport
- Country: Canada
- Sport: Judo
- Weight class: –70 kg, –78 kg

Achievements and titles
- Olympic Games: 9th (2004)
- World Champ.: 5th (2013)
- Pan American Champ.: (2013, 2014)
- Commonwealth Games: (silver) (2002)
Medal record
Women's judo
Representing Canada
Pan American Games
| Silver medal – second place | 2011 Guadalajara | –78 kg |
| Bronze medal – third place | 2007 Rio de Janeiro | –70 kg |
| Bronze medal – third place | 2015 Toronto | –78 kg |
Pan American Championships
| Silver medal – second place | 2013 San José | –78 kg |
| Silver medal – second place | 2014 Guayaquil | –78 kg |
| Bronze medal – third place | 2005 Caguas | –70 kg |
| Bronze medal – third place | 2006 Buenos Aires | –70 kg |
| Bronze medal – third place | 2008 Miami | –70 kg |
| Bronze medal – third place | 2010 San Salvador | –78 kg |
IJF Grand Slam
| Bronze medal – third place | 2013 Paris | –78 kg |
| Bronze medal – third place | 2013 Baku | –78 kg |
IJF Grand Prix
| Gold medal – first place | 2012 Abu Dhabi | –78 kg |
| Bronze medal – third place | 2009 Tunis | –78 kg |
| Bronze medal – third place | 2014 Ulaanbaatar | –78 kg |
Pan American Junior Championships
| Gold medal – first place | 2001 Acapulco | –70 kg |
Summer Universiade
| Silver medal – second place | 2003 Jeju | –70 kg |
| Bronze medal – third place | 2007 Bangkok | –70 kg |
Commonwealth Games
| Silver medal – second place | 2002 Manchester | –70 kg |

Profile at external databases
- IJF: 2219
- JudoInside.com: 858
- Updated on 27 November 2022

Catherine Roberge (born 8 February 1982, in Charlesbourg, Quebec) is a judoka from Canada.

== See also ==
- Judo in Quebec
- Judo in Canada
- List of Canadian judoka
