= 2018 World Judo Championships – Women's 78 kg =

Judo Women's 78 kg at the 2018 World Judo Championships
- Venue: National Gymnastics Arena
- Location: Baku, Azerbaijan
- Dates: 25 September
- Competitors: 35 from 29 nations
- Total prize money: 57,000€

Medalists
gold medal	Shori Hamada (1st title)	Japan
silver medal	Guusje Steenhuis	Netherlands
bronze medal	Marhinde Verkerk	Netherlands
bronze medal	Aleksandra Babintseva	Russia

Competition at external databases
- Links: IJF • JudoInside

The Women's 78 kg competition at the 2018 World Judo Championships was held on 25 September 2018.

== Results ==
=== Finals ===
Semi-finals
(Netherlands) Guusje Steenhuis	10
(China) Ma Zhenzhao	00
(Japan) Shori Hamada	10
(Netherlands) Marhinde Verkerk	00

Final
(Netherlands) Guusje Steenhuis	00
(Japan) Shori Hamada	10

=== Repechage ===
Repechage
(United Kingdom) Katie Jemima Yeats-Brown	10
(France) Madeleine Malonga	00

Third place
(United Kingdom) Katie Jemima Yeats-Brown	00
(Netherlands) Marhinde Verkerk	10

Repechage
(Slovenia) Klara Apotekar	00
(Russia) Aleksandra Babintseva	01

Third place
(Russia) Aleksandra Babintseva	10
(China) Ma Zhenzhao	01

=== Pool A ===
First round
(Ecuador) Vanessa Chala	10
(Portugal) Yahima Ramirez	00

Second round
(Netherlands) Guusje Steenhuis	01
(South Korea) Lee Jeong-yun	00
(Ecuador) Vanessa Chala	00
(Hungary) Evelin Salánki	10
(Cuba) Kaliema Antomarchi	00
(United Kingdom) Katie Jemima Yeats-Brown	10
(Poland) Paula Kułaga	01
(Australia) Melanie Wallis	00

Third round
(Netherlands) Guusje Steenhuis	11
(Hungary) Evelin Salánki	00
(United Kingdom) Katie Jemima Yeats-Brown	11
(Poland) Paula Kułaga	00

Quarterfinals
(Netherlands) Guusje Steenhuis	10
(United Kingdom) Katie Jemima Yeats-Brown	00

=== Pool B ===
First round
(Germany) Anna-Maria Wagner	10
(Belgium) Sophie Berger	00

Second round
(France) Madeleine Malonga	10
(Germany) Anna-Maria Wagner	00
(Guinea) Mamadama Sylla	00
(Kazakhstan) Zarina Raifova	10
(Brazil) Mayra Aguiar	10
(South Africa) Unelle Snyman	00
(China) Ma Zhenzhao	10
(Costa Rica) Diana Brenes	00

Third round
(France) Madeleine Malonga	10
(Kazakhstan) Zarina Raifova	00
(Brazil) Mayra Aguiar	00
(China) Ma Zhenzhao	01

Quarterfinals
(France) Madeleine Malonga	00
(China) Ma Zhenzhao	10

=== Pool C ===
First round
(Poland) Beata Pacut	10
(Uzbekistan) Nodira Yuldasheva	00

Second round
(United Kingdom) Natalie Powell	10
(Gabon) Sarah Myriam Mazouz	00
(Kosovo) Loriana Kuka	00
(Slovenia) Klara Apotekar	10
(Japan) Shori Hamada	10
(Venezuela) Karen León	00
(Austria) Bernadette Graf	01
(Poland) Beata Pacut	00

Third round
(United Kingdom) Natalie Powell	01
(Slovenia) Klara Apotekar	10
(Japan) Shori Hamada	10
(Austria) Bernadette Graf	01

Quarterfinals
(Slovenia) Klara Apotekar	00
(Japan) Shori Hamada	10

=== Pool D ===
First round
(France) Audrey Tcheuméo	10
(Senegal) Bigue Ndiaye	00
(Czech Republic) Alice Matějčková	00
(Russia) Aleksandra Babintseva	10
(Netherlands) Marhinde Verkerk	01
(Germany) Luise Malzahn	00
(Portugal) Patricia Sampaio	10
(Cameroon) Audrey Njepang	00

Second round
(France) Audrey Tcheuméo	01
(Russia) Aleksandra Babintseva	11
(Netherlands) Marhinde Verkerk	10
(Portugal) Patricia Sampaio	00

Quarterfinals
(Russia) Aleksandra Babintseva	00
(Netherlands) Marhinde Verkerk	11

== Prize money ==
The sums listed bring the total prizes awarded to 57,000€ for the individual event.

Medal	Total	Judoka	Coach
Gold	26,000€	20,800€	5,200€
Silver	15,000€	12,000€	3,000€
Bronze	8,000€	6,400€	1,600€
