= Judo at the 2019 European Games – Women's 78 kg =

Judo competition

Judo Women's 78 kg at the 2019 European Games
- Venue: Čyžoŭka-Arena
- Location: Minsk, Belarus
- Date: 24 June
- Competitors: 18 from 13 nations

Medalists
gold medal	Klara Apotekar (1st title)	Slovenia
silver medal	Guusje Steenhuis	Netherlands
bronze medal	Loriana Kuka	Kosovo
bronze medal	Madeleine Malonga	France

Competition at external databases
- Links: IJF • JudoInside

The women's 78 kg judo event at the 2019 European Games in Minsk was held on 24 June at the Čyžoŭka-Arena.

== Results ==
=== Final ===
Final
Guusje Steenhuis (NED)	00
Klara Apotekar (SLO)	01

=== Repechage ===
Repechage
Loriana Kuka (KOS)	01
Anna-Maria Wagner (GER)	00

Third place
Loriana Kuka (KOS)	10
Luise Malzahn (GER)	01

Repechage
Natalie Powell (GBR)	00
Madeleine Malonga (FRA)	10

Third place
Madeleine Malonga (FRA)	10
Marhinde Verkerk (NED)	00

=== Top half ===
Round of 32
Patricia Sampaio (POR)	01
Aleksandra Babintseva (RUS)	11

Round of 16
Guusje Steenhuis (NED)	WO
~~Anastasiya Turchyn (UKR)~~
Loriana Kuka (KOS)	01
Katie Jemima Yeats-Brown (GBR)	00
Anna-Maria Wagner (GER)	10
Karla Prodan (CRO)	00
Marhinde Verkerk (NED)	11
Aleksandra Babintseva (RUS)	01

Quarterfinals
Guusje Steenhuis (NED)	11
Loriana Kuka (KOS)	00
Anna-Maria Wagner (GER)	00
Marhinde Verkerk (NED)	10

Semifinals
Guusje Steenhuis (NED)	10
Marhinde Verkerk (NED)	00

=== Bottom half ===
Round of 32
Antonina Shmeleva (RUS)	10
Evelin Salánki (HUN)	01
Yahima Ramirez (POR)	01
Alexandra Mazilu (ROU)	10

Round of 16
Natalie Powell (GBR)	10
Antonina Shmeleva (RUS)	00
Klara Apotekar (SLO)	10
Bernadette Graf (AUT)	00
Madeleine Malonga (FRA)	10
Alexandra Mazilu (ROU)	00
Luise Malzahn (GER)	10
Beata Pacut (POL)	00

Quarterfinals
Natalie Powell (GBR)	00
Klara Apotekar (SLO)	11
Madeleine Malonga (FRA)	00
Luise Malzahn (GER)	10

Semifinals
Klara Apotekar (SLO)	01
Luise Malzahn (GER)	00
