= 2022 World Judo Championships – Women's 78 kg =

Judo competition

Judo Women's 78 kg at the 2022 World Judo Championships
- Venue: Humo Ice Dome
- Location: Tashkent, Uzbekistan
- Date: 11 October
- Competitors: 33 from 28 nations
- Total prize money: €57,000

Medalists
gold medal	Mayra Aguiar (3rd title)	Brazil
silver medal	Ma Zhenzhao	China
bronze medal	Yelyzaveta Lytvynenko	Ukraine
bronze medal	Beata Pacut-Kloczko	Poland

Competition at external databases
- Links: IJF • JudoInside

The Women's 78 kg event at the 2022 World Judo Championships was held at the Humo Ice Dome arena in Tashkent, Uzbekistan on 11 October 2022.

== Results ==
=== Finals ===
Semi-finals
(Germany) Alina Böhm	00
(Brazil) Mayra Aguiar	01
(China) Ma Zhenzhao	01
(Ukraine) Yelyzaveta Lytvynenko	00

Final
(Brazil) Mayra Aguiar	01
(China) Ma Zhenzhao	00

=== Repechage ===
Repechage
(Germany) Anna-Maria Wagner	00
(Japan) Shori Hamada	10
(Poland) Beata Pacut-Kloczko	01
(Italy) Giorgia Stangherlin	00

Bronze medal
(Japan) Shori Hamada	00
(Ukraine) Yelyzaveta Lytvynenko	10
(Poland) Beata Pacut-Kloczko	10
(Germany) Alina Böhm	00

=== Pool A ===
First round

Round of 32
(Germany) Anna-Maria Wagner	10
(Netherlands) Natascha Ausma	00
(Italy) Alice Bellandi	10
(Kyrgyzstan) Shakhida Narmukhamedova	00
(Germany) Alina Böhm	10
(Cuba) Kaliema Antomarchi	00
(Slovenia) Patricija Brolih	01
(Mongolia) Batbayaryn Erdenet-Od	00

Round of 16
(Germany) Anna-Maria Wagner	10
(Italy) Alice Bellandi	00
(Germany) Alina Böhm	10
(Slovenia) Patricija Brolih	00

Quarter-finals
(Germany) Anna-Maria Wagner	00
(Germany) Alina Böhm	10

=== Pool B ===
First round

Round of 32
(Japan) Shori Hamada	10
(South Korea) Lee Jeong-yun	00
(United Kingdom) Natalie Powell	10
(Morocco) Hafsa Yatim	00
(Brazil) Mayra Aguiar	10
(Croatia) Petrunjela Pavić	00
(Chinese Taipei) Shih Liu Li-ling	00
(Kazakhstan) Aruna Jangeldina	10

Round of 16
(Japan) Shori Hamada	10
(United Kingdom) Natalie Powell	00
(Brazil) Mayra Aguiar	10
(Kazakhstan) Aruna Jangeldina	00

Quarter-finals
(Japan) Shori Hamada	00
(Brazil) Mayra Aguiar	10

=== Pool C ===
First round
(Cyprus) Zanet Michaelidou	10
(Cameroon) Ayuk Otay Arrey Sophina	00

Round of 32
(France) Madeleine Malonga	00
(South Korea) Yoon Hyun-ji	10
(United Kingdom) Emma Reid	00
(China) Ma Zhenzhao	01
(Poland) Beata Pacut-Kloczko	01
(Uzbekistan) Iriskhon Kurbanbaeva	00
(New Zealand) Moira de Villiers	10
(Cyprus) Zanet Michaelidou	00

Round of 16
(South Korea) Yoon Hyun-ji	00
(China) Ma Zhenzhao	11
(Poland) Beata Pacut-Kloczko	10
(New Zealand) Moira de Villiers	00

Quarter-finals
(China) Ma Zhenzhao	11
(Poland) Beata Pacut-Kloczko	00

=== Pool D ===
First round

Round of 32
(Israel) Inbar Lanir	00
(Kosovo) Loriana Kuka	01
(Lithuania) Miglė Dudėnaitė	00
(Ukraine) Yelyzaveta Lytvynenko	10
(Netherlands) Guusje Steenhuis	10
(Montenegro) Jovana Peković	00
(Belgium) Sophie Berger	00
(Italy) Giorgia Stangherlin	10

Round of 16
(Kosovo) Loriana Kuka	00
(Ukraine) Yelyzaveta Lytvynenko	10
(Netherlands) Guusje Steenhuis	00
(Italy) Giorgia Stangherlin	11

Quarter-finals
(Ukraine) Yelyzaveta Lytvynenko	10
(Italy) Giorgia Stangherlin	00
