= 2019 World Judo Championships – Women's 78 kg =

Judo competition

Judo Women's 78 kg at the 2019 World Judo Championships
- Venue: Nippon Budokan
- Location: Tokyo, Japan
- Date: 30 August
- Competitors: 40 from 32 nations
- Total prize money: 57,000$

Medalists
gold medal	Madeleine Malonga (1st title)	France
silver medal	Shori Hamada	Japan
bronze medal	Loriana Kuka	Kosovo
bronze medal	Mayra Aguiar	Brazil

Competition at external databases
- Links: IJF • JudoInside

The Women's 78 kg competition at the 2019 World Judo Championships was held on 30 August 2019.

== Results ==
=== Finals ===
Semi-finals
(Brazil) Mayra Aguiar	00
(France) Madeleine Malonga	10
(Slovenia) Klara Apotekar	00
(Japan) Shori Hamada	10

Final
(France) Madeleine Malonga	11
(Japan) Shori Hamada	00

=== Repechage ===
Repechage
(Kosovo) Loriana Kuka	10
(United Kingdom) Natalie Powell	00

Third place
(Kosovo) Loriana Kuka	11
(Slovenia) Klara Apotekar	00

Repechage
(China) Ma Zhenzhao	00
(Portugal) Patrícia Sampaio	10

Third place
(Portugal) Patrícia Sampaio	00
(Brazil) Mayra Aguiar	10

=== Pool A ===
First round
(Gabon) Sarah Myriam Mazouz	10
(Guinea) Mamadama Sylla	00

Second round
(Brazil) Mayra Aguiar	10
(Portugal) Yahim Ramirez	00
(Germany) Luise Malzahn	00
(Kosovo) Loriana Kuka	01
(Argentina) Lucía Cantero	01
(Venezuela) Karen León	00

Third round
(Brazil) Mayra Aguiar	10
(Gabon) Sarah Myriam Mazouz	00
(Kosovo) Loriana Kuka	10
(Argentina) Lucía Cantero	00

Quarterfinals
(Brazil) Mayra Aguiar	10
(Kosovo) Loriana Kuka	00

=== Pool B ===
First round
(South Korea) Lee Jeong-yun	10
(Russia) Antonina Shmeleva	01
(Costa Rica) Diana Brenes	01
(South Africa) Unelle Snyman	00

Second round
(France) Madeleine Malonga	10
(South Korea) Lee Jeong-yun	00
(Algeria) Kaouthar Ouallal	00
(Ecuador) Vanessa Chala	10
(United Kingdom) Natalie Powell	10
(Costa Rica) Diana Brenes	00
(Cuba) Kaliema Antomarchi	10
(China) Chen Fei	00

Third round
(France) Madeleine Malonga	10
(Ecuador) Vanessa Chala	00
(United Kingdom) Natalie Powell	01
(Cuba) Kaliema Antomarchi	00

Quarterfinals
(France) Madeleine Malonga	10
(United Kingdom) Natalie Powell	00

=== Pool C ===
First round
(China) Ma Zhenzhao	10
(Croatia) Karla Prodan	00
(Slovenia) Klara Apotekar	10
(Democratic Republic of the Congo) Marie Branser	00

Second round
(Netherlands) Guusje Steenhuis	00
(China) Ma Zhenzhao	01
(Thailand) Ikumi Oeda	00
(Austria) Bernadette Graf	10
(Germany) Anna-Maria Wagner	00
(Slovenia) Klara Apotekar	01
(Mongolia) Otgon Munkhtsetseg	01
(South Korea) Yoon Hyun-ji	10

Third round
(China) Ma Zhenzhao	10
(Austria) Bernadette Graf	00
(Slovenia) Klara Apotekar	10
(South Korea) Yoon Hyun-ji	01

Quarterfinals
(China) Ma Zhenzhao	00
(Slovenia) Klara Apotekar	10

=== Pool D ===
First round
(Mexico) Liliana Cardenas	10
(Poland) Beata Pacut	00
(Chinese Taipei) Hsu Wang Shu-huei	00
(Portugal) Patrícia Sampaio	10

Second round
(Japan) Shori Hamada	10
(Mexico) Liliana Cardenas	00
(Belgium) Sophie Berger	10
(Russia) Aleksandra Babintseva	00
(Netherlands) Marhinde Verkerk	01
(United States) Nefeli Papadakis	00
(Portugal) Patrícia Sampaio	10
(Montenegro) Jovana Peković	01

Third round
(Japan) Shori Hamada	10
(Belgium) Sophie Berger	00
(Netherlands) Marhinde Verkerk	00
(Portugal) Patrícia Sampaio	10

Quarterfinals
(Japan) Shori Hamada	10
(Portugal) Patrícia Sampaio	00

== Prize money ==
The sums listed bring the total prizes awarded to $57,000 for the individual event.

Medal	Total	Judoka	Coach
Gold	$26,000	$20,800	$5,200
Silver	$15,000	$12,000	$3,000
Bronze	$8,000	$6,400	$1,600
