= 2020 European Judo Championships – Women's 78 kg =

Judo competition

Judo Women's 78 kg at the 2020 European Judo Championships
- Venue: O2 Arena
- Location: Prague, Czech Republic
- Date: 21 November
- Competitors: 16 from 13 nations

Medalists
| gold medal | Madeleine Malonga (2nd title) | France |
| silver medal | Luise Malzahn | Germany |
| bronze medal | Karla Prodan | Croatia |
| bronze medal | Loriana Kuka | Kosovo |

Competition at external databases
- Links: IJF • JudoInside

The women's 78 kg competition at the 2020 European Judo Championships was held on 21 November at the O2 Arena.

== Results ==
=== Repechage ===
Repechage
Beata Pacut (POL) | 01
Aleksandra Babintseva (RUS) | 00

Third place
Beata Pacut (POL) | 00
Karla Prodan (CRO) | 01

Repechage
Giorgia Stangherlin (ITA) | 10
Antonina Shmeleva (RUS) | 00

Third place
Giorgia Stangherlin (ITA) | 00
Loriana Kuka (KOS) | 10

=== Main bracket ===
Round of 16
Madeleine Malonga (FRA) | 10
Sophie Berger (BEL) | 00
Beata Pacut (POL) | 01
Patricija Brolih (SLO) | 00
Loriana Kuka (KOS) | 10
Yahima Ramirez (POR) | 00
Aleksandra Babintseva (RUS) | 10
Natascha Ausma (NED) | 01
Anna-Maria Wagner (GER) | 00
Giorgia Stangherlin (ITA) | 10
Marhinde Verkerk (NED) | 00
Karla Prodan (CRO) | 01
Luise Malzahn (GER) | 01
Anastasiya Turchyn (UKR) | 00
Antonina Shmeleva (RUS) | 10
Alice Matějková (CZE) | 00

Quarterfinals
Madeleine Malonga (FRA) | 11
Beata Pacut (POL) | 00
Loriana Kuka (KOS) | 11
Aleksandra Babintseva (RUS) | 00
Giorgia Stangherlin (ITA) | 00
Karla Prodan (CRO) | 01
Luise Malzahn (GER) | 10
Antonina Shmeleva (RUS) | 00

Semifinals
Madeleine Malonga (FRA) | 10
Loriana Kuka (KOS) | 00
Karla Prodan (CRO) | 00
Luise Malzahn (GER) | 01

Final
Madeleine Malonga (FRA) | 10
Luise Malzahn (GER) | 00
