= 2018 European Judo Championships – Women's 78 kg =

Judo competition

Judo Women's 78 kg at the 2018 European Judo Championships
- Venue: Expo Tel Aviv
- Location: Tel Aviv, Israel
- Date: 28 April

Medalists
gold medal	Madeleine Malonga (1st title)	France
silver medal	Audrey Tcheuméo	France
bronze medal	Anna-Maria Wagner	Germany
bronze medal	Natalie Powell	Great Britain

Competition at external databases
- Links: IJF • JudoInside

The women's 78 kg competition at the 2018 European Judo Championships was held on 28 April at the Expo Tel Aviv.

== Results ==
=== Final ===
Final
Madeleine Malonga (FRA)	10
Audrey Tcheuméo (FRA)	01

=== Repechage ===
Repechage
Anna-Maria Wagner (GER)	10
Patrícia Sampaio (POR)	00

Third place
Anna-Maria Wagner (GER)	01
Karen Stevenson (NED)	00

Repechage
Loriana Kuka (KOS)	00
Yahima Ramirez (POR)	10

Third place
Yahima Ramirez (POR)	00
Natalie Powell (GBR)	10

=== Top half ===
Quarter-finals
Natalie Powell (GBR)	10
Evelin Salánki (HUN)	00
Anna-Maria Wagner (GER)	10
Linda Politi (ITA)	00
Anastasiya Turchyn (UKR)	00
Patrícia Sampaio (POR)	01
Madeleine Malonga (FRA)	10
Aleksandra Babintseva (RUS)	00

Quarterfinals
Natalie Powell (GBR)	10
Anna-Maria Wagner (GER)	01
Patrícia Sampaio (POR)	00
Madeleine Malonga (FRA)	10

Semifinals
Natalie Powell (GBR)	00
Madeleine Malonga (FRA)	10

=== Bottom half ===
Quarter-finals
Audrey Tcheuméo (FRA)	10
Yarden Mayersohn (ISR)	00
Klara Apotekar (SLO)	00
Loriana Kuka (KOS)	01
Karen Stevenson (NED)	10
Sophie Berger (BEL)	00
Anastasiya Dmitrieva (RUS)	00
Yahima Ramirez (POR)	10

Quarterfinals
Audrey Tcheuméo (FRA)	10
Loriana Kuka (KOS)	00
Karen Stevenson (NED)	01
Yahima Ramirez (POR)	00

Semifinals
Audrey Tcheuméo (FRA)	11
Karen Stevenson (NED)	00
