= 2024 World Judo Championships – Women's 78 kg =

Judo competition

Judo Women's 78 kg at the 2024 World Judo Championships
- Venue: Mubadala Arena
- Location: Abu Dhabi, United Arab Emirates
- Date: 22 May 2024
- Competitors: 41 from 34 nations
- Total prize money: €57,000

Medalists
gold medal	Anna-Maria Wagner (2nd title)	Germany
silver medal	Alice Bellandi	Italy
bronze medal	Madeleine Malonga	France
bronze medal	Emma Reid	Great Britain

Competition at external databases
- Links: IJF • JudoInside

The Women's 78 kg event at the 2024 World Judo Championships was held at the Mubadala Arena in Abu Dhabi, United Arab Emirates on 22 May 2024.

== Results ==
=== Finals ===
Semi-finals
(Germany) Anna-Maria Wagner	02
(United Kingdom) Emma Reid	00 (yellow card)
(Italy) Alice Bellandi	10
(France) Madeleine Malonga	00

Final
(Germany) Anna-Maria Wagner	10 (yellow card)
(Italy) Alice Bellandi	00

=== Repechage ===
Repechage
(South Korea) Lee Jeong-yun	02
(Poland) Beata Pacut-Kloczko	00
(France) Audrey Tcheuméo	10 (yellow card)
(Uzbekistan) Iriskhon Kurbanbaeva	00

Bronze medal
(South Korea) Lee Jeong-yun	01
(France) Madeleine Malonga	10 (yellow card)
(France) Audrey Tcheuméo	01
(United Kingdom) Emma Reid	10

=== Pool A ===
First round
(Montenegro) Jovana Peković	10
(Belgium) Vicky Verschaere	00
(South Korea) Lee Jeong-yun	10
Darya Kantsavaya	00 (yellow card)

Round of 32
(Germany) Anna-Maria Wagner	10
(Burundi) Ange Ciella Niragira	00
(Montenegro) Jovana Peković	00 (yellow card)
(Japan) Shori Hamada	10 (yellow card)
(Ukraine) Yelyzaveta Lytvynenko	01 (yellow card)
(Cameroon) Georgika Wesly Djengue Moune	00
(South Korea) Lee Jeong-yun	02 (yellow card)
(Serbia) Milica Cvijić	00

Round of 16
(Germany) Anna-Maria Wagner	10
(Japan) Shori Hamada	00
(Ukraine) Yelyzaveta Lytvynenko	00
(South Korea) Lee Jeong-yun	10

Quarter-finals
(Germany) Anna-Maria Wagner	10
(South Korea) Lee Jeong-yun	00

=== Pool B ===
First round
(Dominican Republic) Eiraima Silvestre	10
(Croatia) Petrunjela Pavić	00
(Kazakhstan) Aruna Jangeldina	00 (yellow card)
(United Kingdom) Emma Reid	10

Round of 32
(Germany) Alina Böhm	10
(Dominican Republic) Eiraima Silvestre	00
Nadezhda Tatarchenko	00 (yellow card)
(Poland) Beata Pacut-Kloczko	10 (yellow card)
(Netherlands) Guusje Steenhuis	10 (yellow card)
(Guinea) Marie Branser	00
(United Kingdom) Emma Reid	10
(Thailand) Ikumi Oeda	00

Round of 16
(Germany) Alina Böhm	00
(Poland) Beata Pacut-Kloczko	01
(Netherlands) Guusje Steenhuis	00 (yellow card)
(United Kingdom) Emma Reid	01 (yellow card)

Quarter-finals
(Poland) Beata Pacut-Kloczko	00
(United Kingdom) Emma Reid	02

=== Pool C ===
First round
(Ecuador) Vanessa Chalá	02
(Lithuania) Miglė Julija Dudėnaitė	00
(Mongolia) Otgonbayaryn Khüslen	10
(Gabon) Karene Agono Wora	00

Round of 32
(Italy) Alice Bellandi	10
(Ecuador) Vanessa Chalá	00 (yellow card)
(Chinese Taipei) Hsu Wang Shu-huei	00 (yellow card)
(Portugal) Patrícia Sampaio	10
(France) Audrey Tcheuméo	11 (yellow card)
(Peru) Camila Figueroa	00
(Mongolia) Otgonbayaryn Khüslen	00
(South Korea) Yoon Hyun-ji	10 (yellow card)

Round of 16
(Italy) Alice Bellandi	01
(Portugal) Patrícia Sampaio	00
(France) Audrey Tcheuméo	01
(South Korea) Yoon Hyun-ji	00

Quarter-finals
(Italy) Alice Bellandi	11
(France) Audrey Tcheuméo	00

=== Pool D ===
First round
Aleksandra Babintseva	00
(Ukraine) Yuliia Kurchenko	11
(Uzbekistan) Iriskhon Kurbanbaeva	01
(Colombia) Brenda Olaya	00 (yellow card)
(Kenya) Zeddy Cherotich	00
(Cyprus) Zanet Michaelidou	02

Round of 32
(China) Ma Zhenzhao	00
(Ukraine) Yuliia Kurchenko	01
(Uzbekistan) Iriskhon Kurbanbaeva	10 (yellow card)
(Morocco) Hafsa Yatim	00
(France) Madeleine Malonga	11
(Slovenia) Metka Lobnik	00
(Cyprus) Zanet Michaelidou	00
(Croatia) Karla Prodan	10

Round of 16
(Ukraine) Yuliia Kurchenko	00
(Uzbekistan) Iriskhon Kurbanbaeva	10
(France) Madeleine Malonga	01 (yellow card)
(Croatia) Karla Prodan	00

Quarter-finals
(Uzbekistan) Iriskhon Kurbanbaeva	00
(France) Madeleine Malonga	10

== Prize money ==
The sums listed bring the total prizes awarded to €57,000 for the individual event.

Medal	Total	Judoka	Coach
Gold	€26,000	€20,800	€5,200
Silver	€15,000	€12,000	€3,000
Bronze	€8,000	€6,400	€1,600
