= 2017 European Judo Championships – Women's 78 kg =

Judo competition

Judo Women's 78 kg at the 2017 European Judo Championships
- Venue: Torwar Hall
- Location: Warsaw, Poland
- Date: April 22, 2017
- Competitors: 16 from 13 nations

Medalists
gold medal	Audrey Tcheumeo (4th title)	France
silver medal	Guusje Steenhuis	Netherlands
bronze medal	Abigél Joó	Hungary
bronze medal	Natalie Powell	Great Britain

Competition at external databases
- Links: IJF • JudoInside

The women's 78 kg competition at the 2017 European Judo Championships in Warsaw was held on 22 April at the Torwar Hall.

== Results ==
=== Finals ===
Semi-finals
Guusje Steenhuis (NED)	100
Natalie Powell (GBR)	000
Audrey Tcheumeo (FRA)	010
Abigél Joó (HUN)	000

Final
Guusje Steenhuis (NED)	010
Audrey Tcheumeo (FRA)	110

=== Repechages ===
Repechage		Bronze medal
Evelin Salanki (HUN)	000
Klara Apotekar (SLO)	100	Klara Apotekar (SLO)	000
		Abigél Joó (HUN)	100

Repechage		Bronze medal
Karen Stevenson (NED)	010
Anastasiya Turchyn (UKR)	000	Karen Stevenson (NED)	000
		Natalie Powell (GBR)	100

=== Pool A ===
First Round		Quarterfinals
Guusje Steenhuis (NED)	120
Antonina Shmeleva (RUS)	000	Guusje Steenhuis (NED)	110
Assunta Galeone (ITA)	000	Evelin Salanki (HUN)	000
Evelin Salanki (HUN)	100

=== Pool B ===
First Round		Quarterfinals
Natalie Powell (GBR)	100
Beata Pacut (POL)	000	Natalie Powell (GBR)	020
Klara Apotekar (SLO)	100	Klara Apotekar (SLO)	000
Yahima Ramirez (POR)	000

=== Pool C ===
First Round		Quarterfinals
Audrey Tcheumeo (FRA)	100
Anna-Maria Wagner (GER)	000	Audrey Tcheumeo (FRA)	110
Karen Stevenson (NED)	110	Karen Stevenson (NED)	000
Miglė Dudėnaitė (LTU)	000

=== Pool D ===
First Round		Quarterfinals
Abigél Joó (HUN)	100
Valeria Ferrari (ITA)	000	Abigél Joó (HUN)	110
Anastasiya Turchyn (UKR)	010	Anastasiya Turchyn (UKR)	000
Yarden Mayersohn (ISR)	000
