= 2021 World Judo Championships – Women's 78 kg =

Judo competition

Judo Women's 78 kg at the 2021 World Judo Championships
- Venue: László Papp Budapest Sports Arena
- Location: Budapest, Hungary
- Date: 11 June
- Competitors: 31 from 28 nations
- Total prize money: 57,000€

Medalists
gold medal	Anna-Maria Wagner (1st title)	Germany
silver medal	Madeleine Malonga	France
bronze medal	Mami Umeki	Japan
bronze medal	Guusje Steenhuis	Netherlands

Competition at external databases
- Links: IJF • JudoInside

The Women's 78 kg competition at the 2021 World Judo Championships was held on 11 June 2021.

== Results ==
=== Finals ===
Semi-finals
(France) Madeleine Malonga	10
(Netherlands) Guusje Steenhuis	00
(Germany) Anna-Maria Wagner	01
(Japan) Mami Umeki	00

Final
(France) Madeleine Malonga	00
(Germany) Anna-Maria Wagner	01

=== Repechage ===
Repechage
(Ukraine) Anastasiya Turchyn	10
(Israel) Inbar Lanir	00

Third place
(Ukraine) Anastasiya Turchyn	00
(Japan) Mami Umeki	10

Repechage
(Netherlands) Marhinde Verkerk	01
(Germany) Luise Malzahn	00

Third place
(Netherlands) Marhinde Verkerk	00
(Netherlands) Guusje Steenhuis	01

=== Pool A ===
First round
(Croatia) Karla Prodan	10
(Ecuador) Vanessa Chalá	00
(Poland) Beata Pacut	10
(United States) Nefeli Papadakis	00
Niurguiana Nikiforova	00
(Ukraine) Anastasiya Turchyn	10

Second round
(France) Madeleine Malonga	01
(Croatia) Karla Prodan	00
(Poland) Beata Pacut	00
(Ukraine) Anastasiya Turchyn	01

Quarterfinals
(France) Madeleine Malonga	10
(Ukraine) Anastasiya Turchyn	00

=== Pool B ===
First round
(Netherlands) Guusje Steenhuis	10
(Algeria) Kaouthar Ouallal	00
(Democratic Republic of the Congo) Marie Branser	00
(Slovenia) Patricija Brolih	01
(Cuba) Kaliema Antomarchi	01
(Israel) Inbar Lanir	10
(Austria) Bernadette Graf	10
(Bosnia and Herzegovina) Barbara Čikić	00

Second round
(Netherlands) Guusje Steenhuis	10
(Slovenia) Patricija Brolih	00
(Israel) Inbar Lanir	10
(Austria) Bernadette Graf	00

Quarterfinals
(Netherlands) Guusje Steenhuis	10
(Israel) Inbar Lanir	00

=== Pool C ===
First round
(Germany) Anna-Maria Wagner	10
(Mongolia) Batbayaryn Erdenet-Od	00
Antonina Shmeleva	10
(Uzbekistan) Iriskhon Kurbanbaeva	00
(Brazil) Mayra Aguiar	01
(Belgium) Sophie Berger	00
(Netherlands) Marhinde Verkerk	10
(Czech Republic) Alice Matějčková	00

Second round
(Germany) Anna-Maria Wagner	10
Antonina Shmeleva	00
(Brazil) Mayra Aguiar	00
(Netherlands) Marhinde Verkerk	10

Quarterfinals
(Germany) Anna-Maria Wagner	01
(Netherlands) Marhinde Verkerk	00

=== Pool D ===
First round
(Japan) Mami Umeki	10
(Italy) Giorgia Stangherlin	00
(Gabon) Sarah Myriam Mazouz	10
(Thailand) Ikumi Oeda	00
(Germany) Luise Malzahn	10
(Argentina) Lucía Cantero	00
(Montenegro) Jovana Peković	00
(Venezuela) Karen León	10

Second round
(Japan) Mami Umeki	10
(Gabon) Sarah Myriam Mazouz	00
(Germany) Luise Malzahn	10
(Venezuela) Karen León	01

Quarterfinals
(Japan) Mami Umeki	10
(Germany) Luise Malzahn	01

== Prize money ==
The sums listed bring the total prizes awarded to 57,000€ for the individual event.

Medal	Total	Judoka	Coach
Gold	26,000€	20,800€	5,200€
Silver	15,000€	12,000€	3,000€
Bronze	8,000€	6,400€	1,600€
