= Judo at the 2015 European Games – Women's 78 kg =

Judo competition

Judo Women's 78 kg at the 2015 European Games
- Venue: Heydar Aliyev Arena
- Location: Baku, Azerbaijan
- Date: 27 June
- Competitors: 20 from 15 nations

Medalists
gold medal	Marhinde Verkerk (1st title)	Netherlands
silver medal	Luise Malzahn	Germany
bronze medal	Anamari Velenšek	Slovenia
bronze medal	Guusje Steenhuis	Netherlands

Competition at external databases
- Links: IJF • JudoInside

The women's 78 kg judo event at the 2015 European Games in Baku was held on 27 June at the Heydar Aliyev Arena.

== Results ==
=== Final ===
Final
Marhinde Verkerk (NED)	010
Luise Malzahn (GER)	000

=== Repechage ===
Repechage
Abigél Joó (HUN)	000
Natalie Powell (GBR)	100

Third place
Natalie Powell (GBR)	000
Anamari Velenšek (SLO)	100

Repechage
Victoriia Turks (UKR)	000
Guusje Steenhuis (NED)	100

Third place
Guusje Steenhuis (NED)	010
Audrey Tcheuméo (FRA)	000

=== Top half ===
Round of 32
Gunel Hasanli (AZE)	000
Assunta Galeone (ITA)	100
Klara Apotekar (SLO)	000
Anastasiya Dmitrieva (RUS)	100

Round of 16
Audrey Tcheuméo (FRA)	100
Assunta Galeone (ITA)	000
Abigél Joó (HUN)	100
Laia Talarn (ESP)	000
Marhinde Verkerk (NED)	110
Ivana Maranić (CRO)	000
Natalie Powell (GBR)	011
Anastasiya Dmitrieva (RUS)	000

Quarterfinals
Audrey Tcheuméo (FRA)	011
Abigél Joó (HUN)	000
Marhinde Verkerk (NED)	101
Natalie Powell (GBR)	000

Semifinals
Audrey Tcheuméo (FRA)	000
Marhinde Verkerk (NED)	010

=== Bottom half ===
Round of 32
Madeleine Malonga (FRA)	001
Gemma Gibbons (GBR)	010
Daria Pogorzelec (POL)	000
Yahima Ramirez (POR)	000

Round of 16
Anamari Velenšek (SLO)	111
Marta Tort (ESP)	000
Victoriia Turks (UKR)	100
Gemma Gibbons (GBR)	000
Luise Malzahn (GER)	001
Daria Pogorzelec (POL)	001
Guusje Steenhuis (NED)	101
Sofie De Saedelaere (BEL)	000

Quarterfinals
Anamari Velenšek (SLO)	000
Victoriia Turks (UKR)	000
Luise Malzahn (GER)	100
Guusje Steenhuis (NED)	000

Semifinals
Anamari Velenšek (SLO)	000
Luise Malzahn (GER)	010
