= Jovana Peković =

Montenegrin judoka (born 1998)

Personal information
- Born: 16 January 1998 (age 28) Nikšić, Montenegro, FR Yugoslavia
- Occupation: Judoka

Sport
- Country: Montenegro
- Sport: Judo
- Weight class: ‍–‍78 kg

Achievements and titles
- Olympic Games: R32 (2020)
- World Champ.: R32 (2017, 2019, 2021, 2022, 2023, 2024)
- European Champ.: R16 (2016, 2017, 2018, 2021, 2022, 2024, 2025)
Medal record
Women's judo
Representing Montenegro
European U23 Championships
Gold medal – first place	2019 Izhevsk	‍–‍78 kg
World Cadets Championships
Bronze medal – third place	2015 Sarajevo	‍–‍70 kg

Profile at external databases
- IJF: 18702
- JudoInside.com: 67245
- Updated on 26 April 2025

Jovana Peković (Montenegrin: Јована Пековић, born 16 January 1998) is a Montenegrin judoka. She qualified to represent Montenegro at the 2020 Summer Olympics in Tokyo 2021, competing in women's –78 kg category. She has contested a number of International Judo Federation (IJF) events and won medals at European U-23 and World Cadet championships.

== Early life ==
Peković was born on 16 January 1998 in Nikšić, Montenegro, Federal Republic of Yugoslavia.

== Career ==
Peković took part in the 2015 World Judo Cadets Championships in Sarajevo, Bosnia and Herzegovina in the women's –70 kg category. After receiving a bye in the first round, she defeated Bruna Silva of Brazil in the second round and Nefeli Papadakis of the United States in the quarter-finals. However, she lost to eventual gold medalist Karla Prodan of Croatia in the semi-finals. In the repechage, Peković defeated Suzuka Takaku of Japan to win bronze.

In 2019, she contested the 2019 European U23 Judo Championships in Izhevsk, Russia in the women's –78 kg category. In the first round, she defeated Shelley Ludford of Great Britain and then defeated Sophie Berger of Belgium in the quarter-finals. She won her semi-final against Inbar Lanir of Israel before defeating Teresa Zenker of Germany in the final to win the gold medal.

Peković qualified to represent Montenegro at the delayed 2020 Summer Olympics in Tokyo, Japan. The judo evens took place at the Nippon Budokan in Chiyoda, Tokyo and Peković competed in the women's –78 kg category. In the first round, she lost by waza-ari to Karla Prodan of Croatia.
