= 2019 Judo Grand Prix Marrakesh =

Judo competition

Judo 2019 Judo Grand Prix Marrakesh
- Venue: Complexe Sportif Mohammed V
- Location: Marrakesh, Morocco
- Dates: 8–10 March 2019
- Competitors: 440 from 67 nations

Competition at external databases
- Links: IJF • JudoInside

The 2019 Judo Grand Prix Marrakesh was held in Marrakesh, Morocco, from 8 to 10 March 2019.

== Medal summary ==
=== Men's events ===
Event	Gold	Silver	Bronze
Extra-lightweight (−60 kg)	Sharafuddin Lutfillaev (UZB)	Artem Lesiuk (UKR)	Amiran Papinashvili (GEO)
Extra-lightweight (−60 kg)	Sharafuddin Lutfillaev (UZB)	Artem Lesiuk (UKR)	Yanislav Gerchev (BUL)
Half-lightweight (−66 kg)	Sardor Nurillaev (UZB)	Mohamed Abdelmawgoud (EGY)	Yerlan Serikzhanov (KAZ)
Half-lightweight (−66 kg)	Sardor Nurillaev (UZB)	Mohamed Abdelmawgoud (EGY)	Sebastian Seidl (GER)
Lightweight (−73 kg)	Denis Iartsev (RUS)	Lasha Shavdatuashvili (GEO)	Khikmatillokh Turaev (UZB)
Lightweight (−73 kg)	Denis Iartsev (RUS)	Lasha Shavdatuashvili (GEO)	Antoine Bouchard (CAN)
Half-middleweight (−81 kg)	Ivaylo Ivanov (BUL)	Vedat Albayrak (TUR)	Alexios Ntanatsidis (GRE)
Half-middleweight (−81 kg)	Ivaylo Ivanov (BUL)	Vedat Albayrak (TUR)	Damian Szwarnowiecki (POL)
Middleweight (−90 kg)	Nemanja Majdov (SRB)	Eduard Trippel (GER)	Quedjau Nhabali (UKR)
Middleweight (−90 kg)	Nemanja Majdov (SRB)	Eduard Trippel (GER)	Robert Florentino (DOM)
Half-heavyweight (−100 kg)	Benjamin Fletcher (IRL)	Toma Nikiforov (BEL)	Mukhammadkarim Khurramov (UZB)
Half-heavyweight (−100 kg)	Benjamin Fletcher (IRL)	Toma Nikiforov (BEL)	Kayhan Ozcicek-Takagi (AUS)
Heavyweight (+100 kg)	Sven Heinle (GER)	Yerassyl Kazhibayev (KAZ)	Andrii Koleśnyk (UKR)
Heavyweight (+100 kg)	Sven Heinle (GER)	Yerassyl Kazhibayev (KAZ)	Temur Rakhimov (TJK)

=== Women's events ===
Event	Gold	Silver	Bronze
Extra-lightweight (−48 kg)	Julia Figueroa (ESP)	Monica Ungureanu (ROU)	Mélanie Clément (FRA)
Extra-lightweight (−48 kg)	Julia Figueroa (ESP)	Monica Ungureanu (ROU)	Katharina Menz (GER)
Half-lightweight (−52 kg)	Amandine Buchard (FRA)	Ana Pérez Box (ESP)	Gefen Primo (ISR)
Half-lightweight (−52 kg)	Amandine Buchard (FRA)	Ana Pérez Box (ESP)	Estrella López Sheriff (ESP)
Lightweight (−57 kg)	Lien Chen-ling (TPE)	Anna Kuczera (POL)	Timna Nelson-Levy (ISR)
Lightweight (−57 kg)	Lien Chen-ling (TPE)	Anna Kuczera (POL)	Hedvig Karakas (HUN)
Half-middleweight (−63 kg)	Andreja Leški (SLO)	Katharina Haecker (AUS)	Lubjana Piovesana (GBR)
Half-middleweight (−63 kg)	Andreja Leški (SLO)	Katharina Haecker (AUS)	Geke van den Berg (NED)
Middleweight (−70 kg)	Margaux Pinot (FRA)	Megan Fletcher (IRL)	Laura Vargas Koch (GER)
Middleweight (−70 kg)	Margaux Pinot (FRA)	Megan Fletcher (IRL)	Elisavet Teltsidou (GRE)
Half-heavyweight (−78 kg)	Anna-Maria Wagner (GER)	Loriana Kuka (KOS)	Luise Malzahn (GER)
Half-heavyweight (−78 kg)	Anna-Maria Wagner (GER)	Loriana Kuka (KOS)	Patrícia Sampaio (POR)
Heavyweight (+78 kg)	Kayra Sayit (TUR)	Tessie Savelkouls (NED)	Nihel Cheikh Rouhou (TUN)
Heavyweight (+78 kg)	Kayra Sayit (TUR)	Tessie Savelkouls (NED)	Hortence Vanessa Mballa Atangana (CMR)

=== Medal table ===
* Host nation (Morocco)

Rank	Nation	Gold	Silver	Bronze	Total
1	Germany (GER)	2	1	4	7
2	Uzbekistan (UZB)	2	0	2	4
3	France (FRA)	2	0	1	3
4	Spain (ESP)	1	1	1	3
5	Ireland (IRL)	1	1	0	2
5	Turkey (TUR)	1	1	0	2
7	Bulgaria (BUL)	1	0	1	2
8	Chinese Taipei (TPE)	1	0	0	1
8	Russia (RUS)	1	0	0	1
8	Serbia (SRB)	1	0	0	1
8	Slovenia (SLO)	1	0	0	1
12	Ukraine (UKR)	0	1	2	3
13	Australia (AUS)	0	1	1	2
13	Georgia (GEO)	0	1	1	2
13	Kazakhstan (KAZ)	0	1	1	2
13	Netherlands (NED)	0	1	1	2
13	Poland (POL)	0	1	1	2
18	Belgium (BEL)	0	1	0	1
18	Egypt (EGY)	0	1	0	1
18	Kosovo (KOS)	0	1	0	1
18	Romania (ROU)	0	1	0	1
22	Greece (GRE)	0	0	2	2
22	Israel (ISR)	0	0	2	2
24	Cameroon (CMR)	0	0	1	1
24	Canada (CAN)	0	0	1	1
24	Dominican Republic (DOM)	0	0	1	1
24	Great Britain (GBR)	0	0	1	1
24	Hungary (HUN)	0	0	1	1
24	Portugal (POR)	0	0	1	1
24	Tajikistan (TJK)	0	0	1	1
24	Tunisia (TUN)	0	0	1	1
Totals (31 entries)		14	14	28	56
