= 2014 World Sambo Championships =

Sambo competitions

The 2014 World Sambo Championships was held in Narita, Japan from 20 to 24 November 2014. The tournament included competition in both Sambo, and Combat Sambo.

== Medal overview ==
=== Combat Sambo Events ===
Event	Gold	Silver	Bronze
Half-flyweight (52 kg)	Almas Suleimenov (KAZ)	Amyr Bakrasov (RUS)	Muhatmetali Ergeshev (KGZ)
Half-flyweight (52 kg)	Almas Suleimenov (KAZ)	Amyr Bakrasov (RUS)	Sergei Chornyi (UKR)
Flyweight (57 kg)	Andrey Budazhapov (RUS)	Marko Kosev (BUL)	Oleg Udod (UKR)
Flyweight (57 kg)	Andrey Budazhapov (RUS)	Marko Kosev (BUL)	Kazbet Supygaliev (KAZ)
Half-lightweight (62 kg)	Igor Severin (UKR)	Veselin Ivanov (BUL)	Karimberdi Dovletov (TJK)
Half-lightweight (62 kg)	Igor Severin (UKR)	Veselin Ivanov (BUL)	Damlanpurev Baasankhuu (MGL)
Lightweight (68 kg)	Arman Ospanov (KAZ)	Niyazmyrat Shakhmudranov (TKM)	Ayubhon Kamalov (UZB)
Lightweight (68 kg)	Arman Ospanov (KAZ)	Niyazmyrat Shakhmudranov (TKM)	Msallmi Sayfallah (TUN)
Welterweight (74 kg)	Mavrik Nasibyan (ARM)	Tihomir Blagovestov (BUL)	
Welterweight (74 kg)	Mavrik Nasibyan (ARM)	Tihomir Blagovestov (BUL)	Furkat Ruziev (UZB)
Half-middleweight (82 kg)	Dmitry Samoylov (RUS)	Siarhei Filomenka (BLR)	Sanjar Nematov (UZB)
Half-middleweight (82 kg)	Dmitry Samoylov (RUS)	Siarhei Filomenka (BLR)	Oleksandr Turovyski (UKR)
Middleweight (90 kg)	Sultan Aliev (RUS)	Sebastian Libebe (FRA)	Janybek Amatov (KGZ)
Middleweight (90 kg)	Sultan Aliev (RUS)	Sebastian Libebe (FRA)	Sardor Shovrikov (UZB)
Half-heavyweight (100 kg)	Vadim Nemkov (RUS)	Genko Ivanov (BUL)	Islomjon Azimov (UZB)
Half-heavyweight (100 kg)	Vadim Nemkov (RUS)	Genko Ivanov (BUL)	Yevhenii Kikish (UKR)
Heavyweight (+100 kg)	Kirill Sidelnikov (RUS)	Martin Marinkov (BUL)	Makrem Saanouni (TUN)
Heavyweight (+100 kg)	Kirill Sidelnikov (RUS)	Martin Marinkov (BUL)	Ruslan Aushev (KAZ)

=== Men's Sambo Events ===
Event	Gold	Silver	Bronze
Half-flyweight (52 kg)	Gennady Chirgadze (GEO)	Agashif Samadov (AZE)	Vassily Karaulov (RUS)
Half-flyweight (52 kg)	Gennady Chirgadze (GEO)	Agashif Samadov (AZE)	Shavkat Juraev (UZB)
Flyweight (57 kg)	Vakhtangi Chidrashvili (GEO)	Aimergen Atkunov (RUS)	Akmaliddin Karimov (TJK)
Flyweight (57 kg)	Vakhtangi Chidrashvili (GEO)	Aimergen Atkunov (RUS)	Masanori Araki (JPN)
Half-lightweight (62 kg)	Boris Borisov (BUL)	Khushqadam Khusravov (TJK)	Yesset Kuranov (KAZ)
Half-lightweight (62 kg)	Boris Borisov (BUL)	Khushqadam Khusravov (TJK)	Davlatzhon Hamroev (UZB)
Lightweight (68 kg)	Davaadorjiin Tömörkhüleg (MGL)	Levan Nakhurtrishvili (GEO)	Martin Ivanov (BUL)
Lightweight (68 kg)	Davaadorjiin Tömörkhüleg (MGL)	Levan Nakhurtrishvili (GEO)	Emil Hasanov (AZE)
Low-middleweight (74 kg)	Amil Gasimov (AZE)	Ilya Lebedev (RUS)	Desarion Berulava (GEO)
Low-middleweight (74 kg)	Amil Gasimov (AZE)	Ilya Lebedev (RUS)	Alkey Assylbek (KAZ)
Half-middleweight (82 kg)	Vladimir Prikazchikov (RUS)	Ivalyo Ivanov (BUL)	Nico Katsia (GEO)
Half-middleweight (82 kg)	Vladimir Prikazchikov (RUS)	Ivalyo Ivanov (BUL)	Ashtot Danielyan (ARM)
Middleweight (90 kg)	Alsim Chernoskulov (RUS)	Lkhagvasürengiin Otgonbaatar (MGL)	Davit Karbelashvili (GEO)
Middleweight (90 kg)	Alsim Chernoskulov (RUS)	Lkhagvasürengiin Otgonbaatar (MGL)	Andrei Kazusenok (BLR)
Half-heavyweight (100 kg)	Dmitry Eliseev (RUS)	Ariunerdene Batbayar (MGL)	Viktors Resko (LAT)
Half-heavyweight (100 kg)	Dmitry Eliseev (RUS)	Ariunerdene Batbayar (MGL)	Davit Loriashvili (GEO)
Heavyweight (+100 kg)	Artem Osipenko (RUS)	Batmunkh Perenlii (MGL)	Yedil Ussenov (KAZ)
Heavyweight (+100 kg)	Artem Osipenko (RUS)	Batmunkh Perenlii (MGL)	Yury Rybak (BLR)

=== Women's events ===
Event	Gold	Silver	Bronze
Extra-lightweight (48 kg)	Mariya Molchanova (RUS)	Leila Abbasova (BLR)	Yerjanik Karapetyan (ARM)
Extra-lightweight (48 kg)	Mariya Molchanova (RUS)	Leila Abbasova (BLR)	Maria Guedez (VEN)
Half-lightweight (52 kg)	Gauhar Turmakhanova (KAZ)	Anna Kharitonova (RUS)	Mariya Ostapiuk (UKR)
Half-lightweight (52 kg)	Gauhar Turmakhanova (KAZ)	Anna Kharitonova (RUS)	Miharu Kuroki (JPN)
Lightweight (56 kg)	Dorjsürengiin Sumiya (MGL)	Tatyana Zhenchenko (RUS)	Kalina Stefanova (BUL)
Lightweight (56 kg)	Dorjsürengiin Sumiya (MGL)	Tatyana Zhenchenko (RUS)	Daneila Hondiu (ROU)
Welterweight (60 kg)	Miwa Fujimura (JPN)	Katsiyaryna Prakapenka (BLR)	Olena Sayko (UKR)
Welterweight (60 kg)	Miwa Fujimura (JPN)	Katsiyaryna Prakapenka (BLR)	Ana Repida (MDA)
Half-middleweight (64 kg)	Alice Schlesinger (ISR)	Olga Medvedeva (RUS)	Battugs Tumen-Od (MGL)
Half-middleweight (64 kg)	Alice Schlesinger (ISR)	Olga Medvedeva (RUS)	Natalia Budneanu (ROU)
Middleweight (68 kg)	Luiza Gainutdinova (UKR)	Dildash Kuryshbayeva (KAZ)	Yuri Enokidani (JPN)
Middleweight (68 kg)	Luiza Gainutdinova (UKR)	Dildash Kuryshbayeva (KAZ)	Johanna Ylinen (FIN)
Super-middleweight (72 kg)	Irina Alekseeva (RUS)	Nino Odzelashvili (GEO)	Tsend-Ayush Naranjargal (MGL)
Super-middleweight (72 kg)	Irina Alekseeva (RUS)	Nino Odzelashvili (GEO)	Tetyana Savenko (UKR)
Half-heavyweight (80 kg)	Shori Hamada (JPN)	Mariya Oryashkova (BUL)	Sviatlana Tsimashenka (BLR)
Half-heavyweight (80 kg)	Shori Hamada (JPN)	Mariya Oryashkova (BUL)	Natalya Smal (UKR)
Heavyweight (+80 kg)	Anna Balashova (RUS)	Haruka Murase (JPN)	Nina Kutro-Kelly (USA)
Heavyweight (+80 kg)	Anna Balashova (RUS)	Haruka Murase (JPN)	Svetlana Yaromko (UKR)

=== Medal table ===
Rank	Nation	Gold	Silver	Bronze	Total
1	Russia	12	6	1	19
2	Kazakhstan	3	1	6	10
3	Georgia	2	2	4	8
4	Japan	2	1	3	6
5	Ukraine	2	0	9	11
6	Bulgaria	1	6	3	10
7	Mongolia	1	3	3	7
8	Tajikistan	1	1	2	4
9	Azerbaijan	1	1	1	3
10	Armenia	1	0	2	3
11	Israel	1	0	0	1
12	Belarus	0	4	2	6
13	France	0	1	0	1
13	Turkmenistan	0	1	0	1
15	Uzbekistan	0	0	7	7
16	Romania	0	0	2	2
16	Tunisia	0	0	2	2
18	Finland	0	0	1	1
18	Latvia	0	0	1	1
18	Moldova	0	0	1	1
18	United States	0	0	1	1
18	Venezuela	0	0	1	1
Totals (22 entries)		27	27	52	106
