= Karen León =

Venezuelan judoka (born 1997)

Personal information
- Born: 30 November 1997 (age 28)
- Occupation: Judoka

Sport
- Country: Venezuela
- Sport: Judo
- Weight class: ‍–‍78 kg, +78 kg

Achievements and titles
- Olympic Games: R32 (2020)
- World Champ.: R16 (2021, 2026)
- Pan American Champ.: (gold) (2026)
Medal record
Women's judo
Representing Venezuela
Pan American Championships
Gold medal – first place	2026 Panama City	+78 kg
Silver medal – second place	2018 San José	‍–‍78 kg
Silver medal – second place	2022 Lima	‍–‍78 kg
Bronze medal – third place	2020 Guadalajara	‍–‍78 kg
Bronze medal – third place	2021 Guadalajara	‍–‍78 kg
IJF Grand Slam
Bronze medal – third place	2021 Baku	‍–‍78 kg
IJF Grand Prix
Bronze medal – third place	2017 Cancún	‍–‍78 kg
Bronze medal – third place	2025 Guadalajara	+78 kg
Pan American Junior Championships
Gold medal – first place	2017 Cancún	‍–‍78 kg
South American Games
Bronze medal – third place	2018 Cochabamba	‍–‍78 kg
Central American and Caribbean Games
Silver medal – second place	2014 Veracruz	‍–‍78 kg
Silver medal – second place	2018 Barranquilla	‍–‍78 kg
Silver medal – second place	2018 Barranquilla	Women's team
Bronze medal – third place	2014 Veracruz	Women's team

Profile at external databases
- IJF: 16065
- JudoInside.com: 84090
- Updated on 10 October 2026

Karen León (born 30 November 1997) is a Venezuelan judoka. She won one of the bronze medals in the women's 78 kg event at the 2020 Pan American Judo Championships held in Guadalajara, Mexico.

In 2019, she competed in the women's 78 kg event at the Pan American Games held in Lima, Peru. In that same year, she also competed in the women's 78 kg event at the 2019 World Judo Championships held in Tokyo, Japan.

In 2021, she competed in the women's 78 kg event at the Judo World Masters held in Doha, Qatar. In June 2021, she competed in the women's 78 kg event at the World Judo Championships held in Budapest, Hungary.

In July 2021, she walked alongside flagbearer Antonio Díaz during the 2020 Summer Olympics Parade of Nations. She competed in the women's 78 kg event at the 2020 Summer Olympics in Tokyo, Japan.
