= 2021 Judo Grand Slam Kazan =

Judo competition

Judo 2021 Judo Grand Slam Kazan
- Venue: Tatneft Arena
- Location: Kazan, Russia
- Dates: 5–7 May 2021
- Competitors: 407 from 79 nations

Competition at external databases
- Links: IJF • EJU • JudoInside

The 2021 Judo Grand Slam Kazan was held at the TatNeft Arena in Kazan, Russia from 5 to 7 May 2021.

== Medal summary ==
=== Men's events ===
Event	Gold	Silver	Bronze
Extra-lightweight (−60 kg)	Lukhumi Chkhvimiani (GEO)	Robert Mshvidobadze (RUS)	Dauren Syukenov (KAZ)
Extra-lightweight (−60 kg)	Lukhumi Chkhvimiani (GEO)	Robert Mshvidobadze (RUS)	Ramazan Abdulaev (RUS)
Half-lightweight (−66 kg)	Murad Chopanov (RUS)	Dzmitry Minkou (BLR)	Yakub Shamilov (RUS)
Half-lightweight (−66 kg)	Murad Chopanov (RUS)	Dzmitry Minkou (BLR)	Yeset Kuanov (KAZ)
Lightweight (−73 kg)	Makhmadbek Makhmadbekov (RUS)	Ayub Khazhaliev (RUS)	Nugzar Tatalashvili (GEO)
Lightweight (−73 kg)	Makhmadbek Makhmadbekov (RUS)	Ayub Khazhaliev (RUS)	Victor Scvortov (UAE)
Half-middleweight (−81 kg)	Attila Ungvári (HUN)	Alan Khubetsov (RUS)	Lee Sung-ho (KOR)
Half-middleweight (−81 kg)	Attila Ungvári (HUN)	Alan Khubetsov (RUS)	Murad Fatiyev (AZE)
Middleweight (−90 kg)	Sanshiro Murao (JPN)	Eduard Trippel (GER)	Nemanja Majdov (SRB)
Middleweight (−90 kg)	Sanshiro Murao (JPN)	Eduard Trippel (GER)	Luka Maisuradze (GEO)
Half-heavyweight (−100 kg)	Simeon Catharina (NED)	Arman Adamian (RUS)	Cho Gu-ham (KOR)
Half-heavyweight (−100 kg)	Simeon Catharina (NED)	Arman Adamian (RUS)	Niyaz Bilalov (RUS)
Heavyweight (+100 kg)	Tamerlan Bashaev (RUS)	Rafael Silva (BRA)	Johannes Frey (GER)
Heavyweight (+100 kg)	Tamerlan Bashaev (RUS)	Rafael Silva (BRA)	David Moura (BRA)

=== Women's events ===
Event	Gold	Silver	Bronze
Extra-lightweight (−48 kg)	Funa Tonaki (JPN)	Irina Dolgova (RUS)	Francesca Milani (ITA)
Extra-lightweight (−48 kg)	Funa Tonaki (JPN)	Irina Dolgova (RUS)	Irena Khubulova (RUS)
Half-lightweight (−52 kg)	Uta Abe (JPN)	Astride Gneto (FRA)	Ana Pérez Box (ESP)
Half-lightweight (−52 kg)	Uta Abe (JPN)	Astride Gneto (FRA)	Evelyne Tschopp (SUI)
Lightweight (−57 kg)	Hélène Receveaux (FRA)	Daria Kurbonmamadova (RUS)	Marica Perišić (SRB)
Lightweight (−57 kg)	Hélène Receveaux (FRA)	Daria Kurbonmamadova (RUS)	Theresa Stoll (GER)
Half-middleweight (−63 kg)	Agata Ozdoba-Błach (POL)	Ketleyn Quadros (BRA)	Sanne Vermeer (NED)
Half-middleweight (−63 kg)	Agata Ozdoba-Błach (POL)	Ketleyn Quadros (BRA)	Ekaterina Valkova (RUS)
Middleweight (−70 kg)	Madina Taimazova (RUS)	Giovanna Scoccimarro (GER)	Chizuru Arai (JPN)
Middleweight (−70 kg)	Madina Taimazova (RUS)	Giovanna Scoccimarro (GER)	Anna Bernholm (SWE)
Half-heavyweight (−78 kg)	Anna-Maria Wagner (GER)	Natascha Ausma (NED)	Anastasiya Turchyn (UKR)
Half-heavyweight (−78 kg)	Anna-Maria Wagner (GER)	Natascha Ausma (NED)	Luise Malzahn (GER)
Heavyweight (+78 kg)	Romane Dicko (FRA)	Maryna Slutskaya (BLR)	Beatriz Souza (BRA)
Heavyweight (+78 kg)	Romane Dicko (FRA)	Maryna Slutskaya (BLR)	Maria Suelen Altheman (BRA)

Source Results

=== Medal table ===
* Host nation (Russia)

Rank	Nation	Gold	Silver	Bronze	Total
1	Russia (RUS)*	4	6	5	15
2	Japan (JPN)	3	0	1	4
3	France (FRA)	2	1	0	3
4	Germany (GER)	1	2	3	6
5	Netherlands (NED)	1	1	1	3
6	Georgia (GEO)	1	0	2	3
7	Hungary (HUN)	1	0	0	1
7	Poland (POL)	1	0	0	1
9	Brazil (BRA)	0	2	3	5
10	Belarus (BLR)	0	2	0	2
11	Kazakhstan (KAZ)	0	0	2	2
11	Serbia (SRB)	0	0	2	2
11	South Korea (KOR)	0	0	2	2
14	Azerbaijan (AZE)	0	0	1	1
14	Italy (ITA)	0	0	1	1
14	Spain (ESP)	0	0	1	1
14	Sweden (SWE)	0	0	1	1
14	Switzerland (SUI)	0	0	1	1
14	Ukraine (UKR)	0	0	1	1
14	United Arab Emirates (UAE)	0	0	1	1
Totals (20 entries)		14	14	28	56

== Event videos ==
The event was aired freely on the IJF YouTube channel.

	Weight classes	Preliminaries			Final Block
Day 1	Men: -60, -66 Women: -48, -52, -57	Commentated: English, Russian			Finals
Day 1	Men: -60, -66 Women: -48, -52, -57	Tatami 1	Tatami 2	Tatami 3	Finals
Day 2	Men: -73, -81 Women: -63, -70	Commentated: English, Russian			Finals
Day 2	Men: -73, -81 Women: -63, -70	Tatami 1	Tatami 2	Tatami 3	Finals
Day 3	Men: -90, -100, +100 Women: -78, +78	Commentated: English, Russian			Finals
Day 3	Men: -90, -100, +100 Women: -78, +78	Tatami 1	Tatami 2	Tatami 3	Finals
