= 2019 Judo Grand Prix Antalya =

Judo competition

Judo 2019 Judo Grand Prix Antalya
- Location: Antalya, Turkey
- Dates: 5–7 April 2019
- Competitors: 479 from 75 nations

Competition at external databases
- Links: IJF • EJU • JudoInside

The 2019 Judo Grand Prix Antalya was held in Antalya, Turkey, from 5 to 7 April 2019.

== Medal summary ==
=== Men's events ===
Event	Gold	Silver	Bronze
Extra-lightweight (−60 kg)	Yeldos Smetov (KAZ)	Kemran Nurillaev (UZB)	Ashley McKenzie (GBR)
Extra-lightweight (−60 kg)	Yeldos Smetov (KAZ)	Kemran Nurillaev (UZB)	Mihraç Akkuş (TUR)
Half-lightweight (−66 kg)	Denis Vieru (MDA)	Mikhail Pulyaev (RUS)	Bagrati Niniashvili (GEO)
Half-lightweight (−66 kg)	Denis Vieru (MDA)	Mikhail Pulyaev (RUS)	Alberto Gaitero (ESP)
Lightweight (−73 kg)	An Chang-rim (KOR)	Rustam Orujov (AZE)	Guillaume Chaine (FRA)
Lightweight (−73 kg)	An Chang-rim (KOR)	Rustam Orujov (AZE)	Georgios Azoidis (GRE)
Half-middleweight (−81 kg)	Luka Maisuradze (GEO)	Christian Parlati (ITA)	Khasan Khalmurzaev (RUS)
Half-middleweight (−81 kg)	Luka Maisuradze (GEO)	Christian Parlati (ITA)	Antoine Valois-Fortier (CAN)
Middleweight (−90 kg)	Mihael Žgank (TUR)	Giorgi Papunashvili (GEO)	Komronshokh Ustopiriyon (TJK)
Middleweight (−90 kg)	Mihael Žgank (TUR)	Giorgi Papunashvili (GEO)	Avtandili Tchrikishvili (GEO)
Half-heavyweight (−100 kg)	Alexandre Iddir (FRA)	Rafael Buzacarini (BRA)	Elmar Gasimov (AZE)
Half-heavyweight (−100 kg)	Alexandre Iddir (FRA)	Rafael Buzacarini (BRA)	Toma Nikiforov (BEL)
Heavyweight (+100 kg)	Roy Meyer (NED)	Levani Matiashvili (GEO)	Lukáš Krpálek (CZE)
Heavyweight (+100 kg)	Roy Meyer (NED)	Levani Matiashvili (GEO)	Vlăduț Simionescu (ROU)

=== Women's events ===
Event	Gold	Silver	Bronze
Extra-lightweight (−48 kg)	Distria Krasniqi (KOS)	Otgontsetseg Galbadrakh (KAZ)	Milica Nikolić (SRB)
Extra-lightweight (−48 kg)	Distria Krasniqi (KOS)	Otgontsetseg Galbadrakh (KAZ)	Kang Yu-jeong (KOR)
Half-lightweight (−52 kg)	Andreea Chițu (ROU)	Mönkhbatyn Urantsetseg (MGL)	Larissa Pimenta (BRA)
Half-lightweight (−52 kg)	Andreea Chițu (ROU)	Mönkhbatyn Urantsetseg (MGL)	Gultaj Mammadaliyeva (AZE)
Lightweight (−57 kg)	Julia Kowalczyk (POL)	Kaja Kajzer (SLO)	Wen Zhang (CHN)
Lightweight (−57 kg)	Julia Kowalczyk (POL)	Kaja Kajzer (SLO)	Mariia Skora (UKR)
Half-middleweight (−63 kg)	Maylín del Toro Carvajal (CUB)	Tang Jing (CHN)	Alice Schlesinger (GBR)
Half-middleweight (−63 kg)	Maylín del Toro Carvajal (CUB)	Tang Jing (CHN)	Amy Livesey (GBR)
Middleweight (−70 kg)	Elisavet Teltsidou (GRE)	Maria Portela (BRA)	Miriam Butkereit (GER)
Middleweight (−70 kg)	Elisavet Teltsidou (GRE)	Maria Portela (BRA)	Elvismar Rodríguez (VEN)
Half-heavyweight (−78 kg)	Anna-Maria Wagner (GER)	Kaliema Antomarchi (CUB)	Luise Malzahn (GER)
Half-heavyweight (−78 kg)	Anna-Maria Wagner (GER)	Kaliema Antomarchi (CUB)	Anastasiya Turchyn (UKR)
Heavyweight (+78 kg)	Iryna Kindzerska (AZE)	Beatriz Souza (BRA)	Kayra Sayit (TUR)
Heavyweight (+78 kg)	Iryna Kindzerska (AZE)	Beatriz Souza (BRA)	Jasmin Grabowski (GER)

Source Results

=== Medal table ===
* Host nation (Turkey)

Rank	Nation	Gold	Silver	Bronze	Total
1	Georgia (GEO)	1	2	2	5
2	Azerbaijan (AZE)	1	1	2	4
3	Cuba (CUB)	1	1	0	2
3	Kazakhstan (KAZ)	1	1	0	2
5	Germany (GER)	1	0	3	4
6	Turkey (TUR)*	1	0	2	3
7	France (FRA)	1	0	1	2
7	Greece (GRE)	1	0	1	2
7	Romania (ROU)	1	0	1	2
7	South Korea (KOR)	1	0	1	2
11	Kosovo (KOS)	1	0	0	1
11	Moldova (MDA)	1	0	0	1
11	Netherlands (NED)	1	0	0	1
11	Poland (POL)	1	0	0	1
15	Brazil (BRA)	0	3	1	4
16	China (CHN)	0	1	1	2
16	Russia (RUS)	0	1	1	2
18	Italy (ITA)	0	1	0	1
18	Mongolia (MGL)	0	1	0	1
18	Slovenia (SLO)	0	1	0	1
18	Uzbekistan (UZB)	0	1	0	1
22	Great Britain (GBR)	0	0	3	3
23	Ukraine (UKR)	0	0	2	2
24	Belgium (BEL)	0	0	1	1
24	Canada (CAN)	0	0	1	1
24	Czech Republic (CZE)	0	0	1	1
24	Serbia (SRB)	0	0	1	1
24	Spain (ESP)	0	0	1	1
24	Tajikistan (TJK)	0	0	1	1
24	Venezuela (VEN)	0	0	1	1
Totals (30 entries)		14	14	28	56
