= Shori Hamada =

Japanese judoka (born 1990)

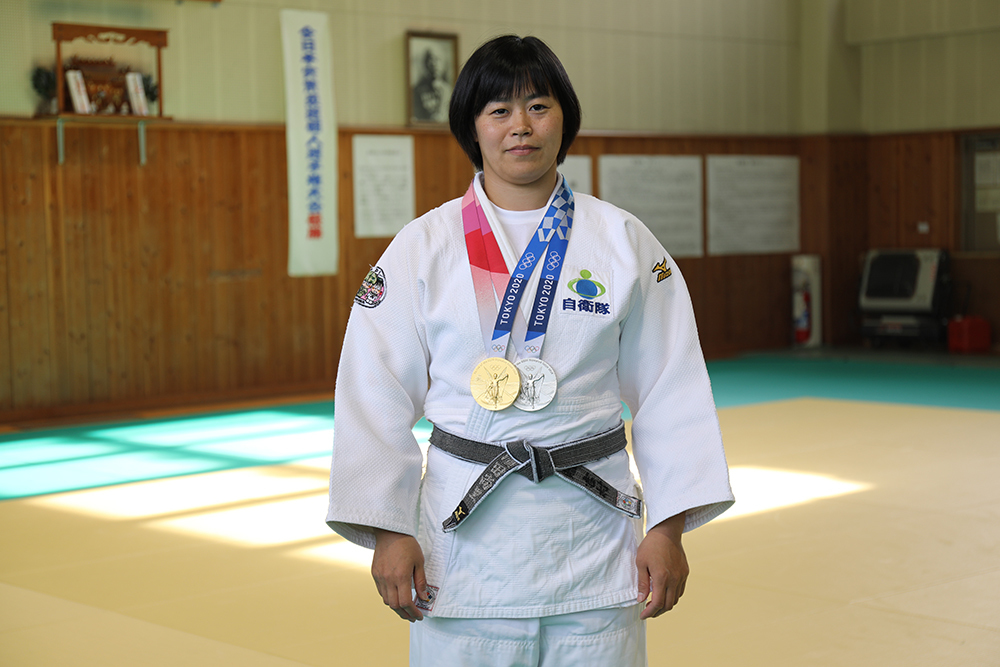
- Hamada in 2021

Personal information
- Nationality: Japanese
- Born: 25 September 1990 (age 35) Kirishima-Shi, Kagoshima-ken, Japan
- Occupation: Judoka
- Height: 1.67 m (5 ft 6 in)

Sport
- Country: Japan
- Sport: Judo
- Weight class: –78 kg

Achievements and titles
- Olympic Games: (gold) (2020)
- World Champ.: (2018)
- Asian Champ.: (gold) (2017)
Medal record
Women's judo
Representing Japan
Olympic Games
Gold medal – first place	2020 Tokyo	‍–‍78 kg
Silver medal – second place	2020 Tokyo	Mixed team
World Championships
Gold medal – first place	2018 Baku	‍–‍78 kg
Silver medal – second place	2019 Tokyo	‍–‍78 kg
Asian Championships
Gold medal – first place	2017 Hong Kong	‍–‍78 kg
World Masters
Silver medal – second place	2021 Doha	‍–‍78 kg
Bronze medal – third place	2018 Guangzhou	‍–‍78 kg
IJF Grand Slam
Gold medal – first place	2017 Tokyo	‍–‍78 kg
Gold medal – first place	2020 Düsseldorf	‍–‍78 kg
Gold medal – first place	2021 Antalya	‍–‍78 kg
Silver medal – second place	2019 Osaka	‍–‍78 kg
Silver medal – second place	2022 Tokyo	‍–‍78 kg
Silver medal – second place	2023 Antalya	‍–‍78 kg
Bronze medal – third place	2014 Tokyo	‍–‍78 kg
Bronze medal – third place	2015 Tyumen	‍–‍78 kg
Bronze medal – third place	2018 Paris	‍–‍78 kg
Bronze medal – third place	2018 Osaka	‍–‍78 kg
Bronze medal – third place	2019 Baku	‍–‍78 kg
Bronze medal – third place	2022 Budapest	‍–‍78 kg
IJF Grand Prix
Gold medal – first place	2015 Qingdao	‍–‍78 kg
Gold medal – first place	2017 Zagreb	‍–‍78 kg
Gold medal – first place	2019 Montreal	‍–‍78 kg
Women's sambo
World Championships
Gold medal – first place	2014 Narita	‍–‍80 kg

Profile at external databases
- IJF: 17473
- JudoInside.com: 79927
- Updated on 23 May 2023

Shori Hamada (濵田 尚里, Hamada Shōri; born 25 September 1990) is a Japanese medal-winning Olympic judoka and army officer. In 2018 She won the gold medal in the 2018 World Judo Championships. In 2021 she won the gold medal in the women's 78 kg event, and silver in the mixed team event, at the 2020 Summer Olympics held in Tokyo, Japan.

== Career ==
Hamada was born in Kagoshima prefecture and started Judo at the age of ten. When she was in Kagoshima Minami High School, she was taught newaza (ground grappling techniques) rigorously by her school judo coach, which made her win the second place in the -78 kg category of the All Japan High School Championships. Also during this period, she repeatedly studied videos of Katsuhiko Kashiwazaki and absorbed his newaza techniques. After the high school she played at Yamanashi Gakuin University, where she started Sambo, a Russian combat sport, alongside Judo to expand her range of newaza skills, and won the gold medal at 2014 World Sambo Championships. After the university she joined the Japan Self-Defense Forces where she brushed up her transition skills between tachiwaza (standing/throwing techniques) and newaza. With her highly skilled newaza, she won the gold medal at the 2018 World Judo Championships, and the silver medal in the 2019 World Judo Championships. She won the gold medal in 2020 Judo Grand Slam Düsseldorf and was officially nominated by the All Japan Judo Federation for the -78 kg category representative of the Tokyo Olympic Games.

In the Olympic Games held at Tokyo in 2021, she won the gold medal in the -78 kg category, defeating Beata Pacut (Poland), Aleksandra Babintseva (Russia), Anna-Maria Wagner (Germany), and Madeleine Malonga (France), all with Ippon by newaza. Also she got the silver medal as a registered member of the mixed team category though she had no opportunity to fight in the category.

As of July 2021, her rank in the Ground Self-Defense Force of Japan is captain. She is often referred to as the "Newaza no Jouou (Queen of Newaza)" or "Newaza-shi (Newaza Master)" in Japanese media.

== Judo style ==
Hamada's judo is characterized by her overwhelming newaza skills. Most of her recorded wins were with Ippon by newaza. Although she has some powerful standing techniques such as Uchi mata and Ouchi gari, she mostly uses them as a transition to a ground fight, and once on the ground, she attacks from any direction (under, over, or side of the opponent) with her masterly newaza techniques such as Hikikomi gaeshi and Ude garami (Kimura Lock) gaeshi, which, with a high probability, leads to osaekomi or tapping out by arm-joint lock. She also favors using various shimewaza (choking techniques) to finish her fights. In Japan her relentless newaza attack is often compared to an ant-lion larvae attacking ants.
