= 2019 Judo Grand Slam Baku =

Judo competition

Judo 2019 Judo Grand Slam Baku
- Venue: Heydar Aliyev Sports and Exhibition Complex
- Location: Baku, Azerbaijan
- Dates: 10–12 May 2019
- Competitors: 431 from 57 nations

Competition at external databases
- Links: IJF • EJU • JudoInside

The 2019 Judo Grand Slam Baku was held in Baku, Azerbaijan from 10 to 12 May 2019.

== Medal summary ==
=== Men's events ===
Event	Gold	Silver	Bronze
Extra-lightweight (−60 kg)	Felipe Kitadai (BRA)	Temur Nozadze (GEO)	Yago Abuladze (RUS)
Extra-lightweight (−60 kg)	Felipe Kitadai (BRA)	Temur Nozadze (GEO)	Dashdavaagiin Amartüvshin (MGL)
Half-lightweight (−66 kg)	Denis Vieru (MDA)	Nijat Shikhalizada (AZE)	Yondonperenlein Baskhüü (MGL)
Half-lightweight (−66 kg)	Denis Vieru (MDA)	Nijat Shikhalizada (AZE)	Bogdan Iadov (UKR)
Lightweight (−73 kg)	Hidayat Heydarov (AZE)	Tohar Butbul (ISR)	Rustam Orujov (AZE)
Lightweight (−73 kg)	Hidayat Heydarov (AZE)	Tohar Butbul (ISR)	Telman Valiyev (AZE)
Half-middleweight (−81 kg)	Sagi Muki (ISR)	Ivaylo Ivanov (BUL)	Tato Grigalashvili (GEO)
Half-middleweight (−81 kg)	Sagi Muki (ISR)	Ivaylo Ivanov (BUL)	Matthias Casse (BEL)
Middleweight (−90 kg)	Nemanja Majdov (SRB)	Mammadali Mehdiyev (AZE)	Krisztián Tóth (HUN)
Middleweight (−90 kg)	Nemanja Majdov (SRB)	Mammadali Mehdiyev (AZE)	Nikoloz Sherazadishvili (ESP)
Half-heavyweight (−100 kg)	Michael Korrel (NED)	Kazbek Zankishiev (RUS)	Zelym Kotsoiev (AZE)
Half-heavyweight (−100 kg)	Michael Korrel (NED)	Kazbek Zankishiev (RUS)	Benjamin Fletcher (IRL)
Heavyweight (+100 kg)	Gela Zaalishvili (GEO)	Ruslan Shakhbazov (RUS)	Anton Krivobokov (RUS)
Heavyweight (+100 kg)	Gela Zaalishvili (GEO)	Ruslan Shakhbazov (RUS)	Vlăduț Simionescu (ROU)

Source Results

=== Women's events ===
Event	Gold	Silver	Bronze
Extra-lightweight (−48 kg)	Laura Martínez (ESP)	Julia Figueroa (ESP)	Catarina Costa (POR)
Extra-lightweight (−48 kg)	Laura Martínez (ESP)	Julia Figueroa (ESP)	Milica Nikolić (SRB)
Half-lightweight (−52 kg)	Amandine Buchard (FRA)	Ai Shishime (JPN)	Larissa Pimenta (BRA)
Half-lightweight (−52 kg)	Amandine Buchard (FRA)	Ai Shishime (JPN)	Gefen Primo (ISR)
Lightweight (−57 kg)	Rafaela Silva (BRA)	Tsukasa Yoshida (JPN)	Hedvig Karakas (HUN)
Lightweight (−57 kg)	Rafaela Silva (BRA)	Tsukasa Yoshida (JPN)	Hélène Receveaux (FRA)
Half-middleweight (−63 kg)	Miku Tashiro (JPN)	Tina Trstenjak (SLO)	Martyna Trajdos (GER)
Half-middleweight (−63 kg)	Miku Tashiro (JPN)	Tina Trstenjak (SLO)	Juul Franssen (NED)
Middleweight (−70 kg)	Chizuru Arai (JPN)	Anna Bernholm (SWE)	Gemma Howell (GBR)
Middleweight (−70 kg)	Chizuru Arai (JPN)	Anna Bernholm (SWE)	María Bernabéu (ESP)
Half-heavyweight (−78 kg)	Luise Malzahn (GER)	Anna-Maria Wagner (GER)	Shori Hamada (JPN)
Half-heavyweight (−78 kg)	Luise Malzahn (GER)	Anna-Maria Wagner (GER)	Madeleine Malonga (FRA)
Heavyweight (+78 kg)	Yelyzaveta Kalanina (UKR)	Larisa Cerić (BIH)	Iryna Kindzerska (AZE)
Heavyweight (+78 kg)	Yelyzaveta Kalanina (UKR)	Larisa Cerić (BIH)	Anamari Velenšek (SLO)

Source Results

=== Medal table ===
* Host nation (Azerbaijan)

Rank	Nation	Gold	Silver	Bronze	Total
1	Japan (JPN)	2	2	1	5
2	Brazil (BRA)	2	0	1	3
3	Azerbaijan (AZE)*	1	2	4	7
4	Spain (ESP)	1	1	2	4
5	Georgia (GEO)	1	1	1	3
5	Germany (GER)	1	1	1	3
5	Israel (ISR)	1	1	1	3
8	France (FRA)	1	0	2	3
9	Netherlands (NED)	1	0	1	2
9	Serbia (SRB)	1	0	1	2
9	Ukraine (UKR)	1	0	1	2
12	Moldova (MDA)	1	0	0	1
13	Russia (RUS)	0	2	2	4
14	Slovenia (SLO)	0	1	1	2
15	Bosnia and Herzegovina (BIH)	0	1	0	1
15	Bulgaria (BUL)	0	1	0	1
15	Sweden (SWE)	0	1	0	1
18	Hungary (HUN)	0	0	2	2
18	Mongolia (MGL)	0	0	2	2
20	Belgium (BEL)	0	0	1	1
20	Great Britain (GBR)	0	0	1	1
20	Ireland (IRL)	0	0	1	1
20	Portugal (POR)	0	0	1	1
20	Romania (ROU)	0	0	1	1
Totals (24 entries)		14	14	28	56
