= Beata Pacut =

Polish judoka (born 1995)

Personal information
- Born: 13 December 1995 (age 30)
- Occupation: Judoka

Sport
- Country: Poland
- Sport: Judo
- Weight class: ‍–‍78 kg

Achievements and titles
- Olympic Games: R16 (2020, 2024)
- World Champ.: (bronze) (2022)
- European Champ.: (gold) (2021)
Medal record
Women's judo
Representing Poland
World Championships
Bronze medal – third place	2022 Tashkent	‍–‍78 kg
European Championships
Gold medal – first place	2021 Lisbon	‍–‍78 kg
IJF Grand Slam
Gold medal – first place	2022 Tel Aviv	‍–‍78 kg
Silver medal – second place	2021 Antalya	‍–‍78 kg
Bronze medal – third place	2018 Abu Dhabi	‍–‍78 kg
Bronze medal – third place	2024 Dushanbe	‍–‍78 kg
IJF Grand Prix
Silver medal – second place	2017 Tashkent	‍–‍78 kg
Bronze medal – third place	2018 Tbilisi	‍–‍78 kg
Bronze medal – third place	2018 Tashkent	‍–‍78 kg
Bronze medal – third place	2019 Perth	‍–‍78 kg
European U23 Championships
Bronze medal – third place	2015 Bratislava	+78 kg
Bronze medal – third place	2017 Podgorica	‍–‍78 kg
World Juniors Championships
Bronze medal – third place	2014 Fort Lauderdale	‍–‍78 kg
European Junior Championships
Silver medal – second place	2014 Bucharest	‍–‍78 kg
Military World Games
Bronze medal – third place	2019 Wuhan	‍–‍78 kg

Profile at external databases
- IJF: 8006
- JudoInside.com: 71799
- Updated on 3 August 2024

Beata Pacut-Kłoczko (born 13 December 1995) is a Polish judoka. She is a bronze medalist at the 2022 World Judo Championships and a gold medalist at the 2021 European Judo Championships. She represented Poland at the 2020 Summer Olympics in Tokyo, Japan and the 2024 Summer Olympics in Paris, France.

She competed at the World Judo Championships in 2017, 2018, 2019, 2021, 2023 and 2024.

== Career ==
Pacut competed in the women's 78 kg and women's team events at the 2017 European Judo Championships held in Warsaw, Poland.

In 2019, Pacut won one of the bronze medals in the women's 78 kg event at the Military World Games held in Wuhan, China. In 2020, she lost her bronze medal match against Karla Prodan of Croatia in the women's 78 kg event at the European Judo Championships held in Prague, Czech Republic.

In 2021, Pacut competed in the women's 78 kg event at the Judo World Masters held in Doha, Qatar. A few months later, she won the gold medal in her event at the 2021 European Judo Championships held in Lisbon, Portugal. In June 2021, she competed in the women's 78 kg event at the World Judo Championships held in Budapest, Hungary.

Pacut represented Poland at the 2020 Summer Olympics in Tokyo, Japan. She competed in the women's 78 kg event where she was eliminated in her second match by Shori Hamada of Japan.

In 2022, Pacut lost her bronze medal match in her event at the Judo Grand Prix Almada held in Almada, Portugal. She won the gold medal in her event at the 2022 Judo Grand Slam Tel Aviv held in Tel Aviv, Israel.

== Achievements ==
Year	Tournament	Place	Weight class
2021	European Championships	1st	−78 kg
2022	World Championships	3rd	−78 kg
