= Sarah Myriam Mazouz =

Gabonese judoka (born 1987)

Sarah Mazouz
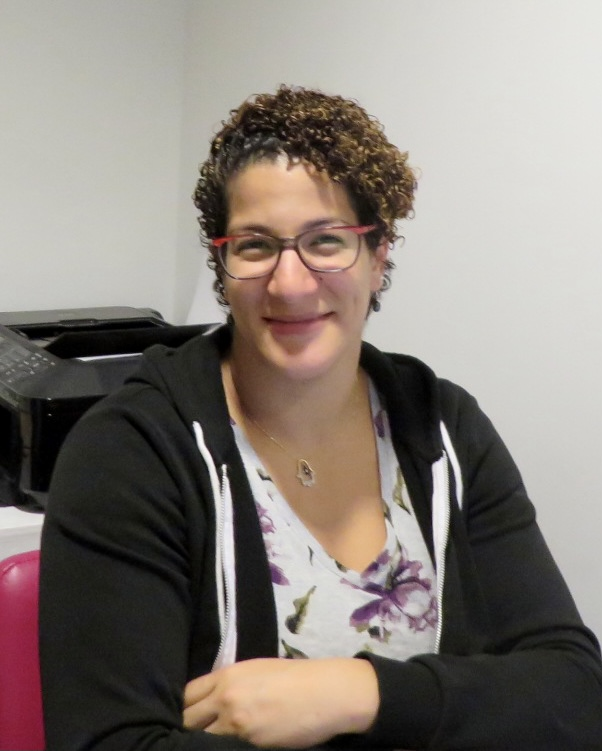
- Mazouz in 2017

Personal information
- Full name: Sarah Myriam Mazouz
- Born: 29 April 1987 (age 39) Franceville, Gabon
- Occupation: Judoka

Sport
- Country: Canada (2012 – March 2014); Gabon (April 2014 – present)
- Sport: Judo
- Weight class: ‍–‍78 kg

Achievements and titles
- Olympic Games: R16 (2016)
- World Champ.: R16 (2015, 2019, 2021)
- African Champ.: (silver) (2014, 2015, 2020)
Medal record
Women's judo
Representing Gabon
African Games
Gold medal – first place	2019 Rabat	‍–‍78 kg
African Championships
Silver medal – second place	2014 Port Louis	‍–‍78 kg
Silver medal – second place	2015 Libreville	‍–‍78 kg
Silver medal – second place	2020 Antananarivo	‍–‍78 kg
Bronze medal – third place	2016 Tunis	‍–‍78 kg
Bronze medal – third place	2019 Cape Town	‍–‍78 kg
IJF Grand Prix
Silver medal – second place	2015 Ulaanbaatar	‍–‍78 kg

Profile at external databases
- IJF: 16357, 10678
- JudoInside.com: 69230
- Updated on 16 December 2022

Sarah Myriam Mazouz (born 29 April 1987), also known as Sarah-Myriam Mazouz, is a Gabonese judoka. She competed in Judo at the 2016 Summer Olympics in the women's 78 kg event, in which she was eliminated in the second round by Natalie Powell.

In 2019, Mazouz won one of the bronze medals in the women's 78 kg event at the 2019 African Judo Championships held in Cape Town, South Africa. She also won the gold medal in the women's 78 kg event at the 2019 African Games.

Mazouz competed in the women's 78 kg event at the 2020 Summer Olympics, losing out to Beata Pacut of Poland.

In 2025, Mazouz competed in the third season of Survivor Québec.
