= 2018 Judo Grand Prix Tashkent =

Judo competition

Judo 2018 Judo Grand Prix Tashkent
- Venue: Uzbekistan Tennis Courts
- Location: Tashkent, Uzbekistan
- Dates: 9–11 November 2018
- Competitors: 347 from 47 nations

Competition at external databases
- Links: IJF • EJU • JudoInside

The 2018 Judo Grand Prix Tashkent was held in Tashkent, Uzbekistan, from 9 to 11 November 2018.

== Medal summary ==
=== Medal table ===
* Host nation (Uzbekistan)

Rank	Nation	Gold	Silver	Bronze	Total
1	Kosovo (KOS)	3	1	0	4
2	Azerbaijan (AZE)	3	0	1	4
3	Mongolia (MGL)	2	1	0	3
4	Germany (GER)	1	3	5	9
5	Uzbekistan (UZB)*	1	3	1	5
6	Austria (AUT)	1	1	1	3
7	Russia (RUS)	1	0	2	3
7	Slovenia (SLO)	1	0	2	3
9	Kazakhstan (KAZ)	1	0	1	2
10	Hungary (HUN)	0	2	1	3
11	France (FRA)	0	1	0	1
11	Italy (ITA)	0	1	0	1
11	Switzerland (SUI)	0	1	0	1
14	Kyrgyzstan (KGZ)	0	0	2	2
14	Poland (POL)	0	0	2	2
16	Belarus (BLR)	0	0	1	1
16	Chinese Taipei (TPE)	0	0	1	1
16	Egypt (EGY)	0	0	1	1
16	Greece (GRE)	0	0	1	1
16	Portugal (POR)	0	0	1	1
16	Serbia (SRB)	0	0	1	1
16	Spain (ESP)	0	0	1	1
16	Ukraine (UKR)	0	0	1	1
16	United Arab Emirates (UAE)	0	0	1	1
16	Venezuela (VEN)	0	0	1	1
Totals (25 entries)		14	14	28	56

=== Men's events ===
Event	Gold	Silver	Bronze
Extra-lightweight (−60 kg)	Ganbatyn Boldbaatar (MGL)	Diyorbek Urozboev (UZB)	Moritz Plafky (GER)
Extra-lightweight (−60 kg)	Ganbatyn Boldbaatar (MGL)	Diyorbek Urozboev (UZB)	Yang Yung-wei (TPE)
Half-lightweight (−66 kg)	Adrian Gomboc (SLO)	Sardor Nurillaev (UZB)	Shakhram Akhadov (UZB)
Half-lightweight (−66 kg)	Adrian Gomboc (SLO)	Sardor Nurillaev (UZB)	Nijat Shikhalizada (AZE)
Lightweight (−73 kg)	Khikmatillokh Turaev (UZB)	Igor Wandtke (GER)	Victor Scvortov (UAE)
Lightweight (−73 kg)	Khikmatillokh Turaev (UZB)	Igor Wandtke (GER)	Oleg Babgoev (RUS)
Half-middleweight (−81 kg)	Didar Khamza (KAZ)	Nyamsürengiin Dagvasüren (MGL)	Vladimir Zoloev (KGZ)
Half-middleweight (−81 kg)	Didar Khamza (KAZ)	Nyamsürengiin Dagvasüren (MGL)	Alexios Ntanatsidis (GRE)
Middleweight (−90 kg)	Mammadali Mehdiyev (AZE)	Krisztián Tóth (HUN)	Eduard Trippel (GER)
Middleweight (−90 kg)	Mammadali Mehdiyev (AZE)	Krisztián Tóth (HUN)	Ivan Vorobev (RUS)
Half-heavyweight (−100 kg)	Elmar Gasimov (AZE)	Alexandre Iddir (FRA)	Ramadan Darwish (EGY)
Half-heavyweight (−100 kg)	Elmar Gasimov (AZE)	Alexandre Iddir (FRA)	Karl-Richard Frey (GER)
Heavyweight (+100 kg)	Soslan Bostanov (RUS)	Bekmurod Oltiboev (UZB)	Iurii Krakovetskii (KGZ)
Heavyweight (+100 kg)	Soslan Bostanov (RUS)	Bekmurod Oltiboev (UZB)	Yerassyl Kazhibayev (KAZ)

=== Women's events ===
Event	Gold	Silver	Bronze
Extra-lightweight (−48 kg)	Distria Krasniqi (KOS)	Éva Csernoviczki (HUN)	Milica Nikolić (SRB)
Extra-lightweight (−48 kg)	Distria Krasniqi (KOS)	Éva Csernoviczki (HUN)	Joana Diogo (POR)
Half-lightweight (−52 kg)	Majlinda Kelmendi (KOS)	Evelyne Tschopp (SUI)	Agata Perenc (POL)
Half-lightweight (−52 kg)	Majlinda Kelmendi (KOS)	Evelyne Tschopp (SUI)	Ana Pérez Box (ESP)
Lightweight (−57 kg)	Theresa Stoll (GER)	Nora Gjakova (KOS)	Kaja Kajzer (SLO)
Lightweight (−57 kg)	Theresa Stoll (GER)	Nora Gjakova (KOS)	Amelie Stoll (GER)
Half-middleweight (−63 kg)	Baldorjyn Möngönchimeg (MGL)	Maria Centracchio (ITA)	Andreja Leški (SLO)
Half-middleweight (−63 kg)	Baldorjyn Möngönchimeg (MGL)	Maria Centracchio (ITA)	Kathrin Unterwurzacher (AUT)
Middleweight (−70 kg)	Michaela Polleres (AUT)	Giovanna Scoccimarro (GER)	Elvismar Rodríguez (VEN)
Middleweight (−70 kg)	Michaela Polleres (AUT)	Giovanna Scoccimarro (GER)	Szabina Gercsák (HUN)
Half-heavyweight (−78 kg)	Loriana Kuka (KOS)	Bernadette Graf (AUT)	Beata Pacut (POL)
Half-heavyweight (−78 kg)	Loriana Kuka (KOS)	Bernadette Graf (AUT)	Luise Malzahn (GER)
Heavyweight (+78 kg)	Iryna Kindzerska (AZE)	Carolin Weiß (GER)	Maryna Slutskaya (BLR)
Heavyweight (+78 kg)	Iryna Kindzerska (AZE)	Carolin Weiß (GER)	Yelyzaveta Kalanina (UKR)

Source Results
