= Judo at the 2020 Summer Olympics – Women's 78 kg =

Judo competition

Women's 78 kg at the Games of the XXXII Olympiad
- Venue: Nippon Budokan
- Date: 29 July 2021
- Competitors: 24 from 24 nations

Medalists
1st place, gold medalist(s)		Shori Hamada	Japan
2nd place, silver medalist(s)		Madeleine Malonga	France
3rd place, bronze medalist(s)		Anna-Maria Wagner	Germany
3rd place, bronze medalist(s)		Mayra Aguiar	Brazil

The women's 78 kg competition in judo at the 2020 Summer Olympics in Tokyo was held on 29 July 2021 at the Nippon Budokan.

== Results ==
=== Finals ===
Semi-finals
1 Madeleine Malonga (FRA)	10
Yoon Hyun-ji (KOR)	00
2 Shori Hamada (JPN)	10
3 Anna-Maria Wagner (GER)	00

Gold medal
1 Madeleine Malonga (FRA)	00
2 Shori Hamada (JPN)	10

=== Repechage ===
Repechage
8 Kaliema Antomarchi (CUB)	10
4 Guusje Steenhuis (NED)	00

Bronze medal
3 Anna-Maria Wagner (GER)	01
8 Kaliema Antomarchi (CUB)	00

Repechage
Aleksandra Babintseva (ROC)	00
6 Mayra Aguiar (BRA)	10

Bronze medal
Yoon Hyun-ji (KOR)	00
6 Mayra Aguiar (BRA)	10

=== Pool A ===
Round of 32
Ma Zhenzhao (CHN)	00
Bernadette Graf (AUT)	10
Karla Prodan (CRO)	01
Jovana Peković (MNE)	00

Round of 16
1 Madeleine Malonga (FRA)	11
Bernadette Graf (AUT)	00
8 Kaliema Antomarchi (CUB)	01
Karla Prodan (CRO)	00

Quarter-finals
1 Madeleine Malonga (FRA)	11
8 Kaliema Antomarchi (CUB)	01

=== Pool B ===
Round of 32
Anastasiya Turchyn (UKR)	10
Vanessa Chalá (ECU)	00
Nefeli Papadakis (USA)	00
Yoon Hyun-ji (KOR)	10

Round of 16
4 Guusje Steenhuis (NED)	01
Anastasiya Turchyn (UKR)	00
5 Natalie Powell (GBR)	00
Yoon Hyun-ji (KOR)	11

Quarter-finals
4 Guusje Steenhuis (NED)	00
Yoon Hyun-ji (KOR)	10

=== Pool C ===
Round of 32
Beata Pacut (POL)	10
Sarah-Myriam Mazouz (GAB)	00
Marie Branser (COD)	01
Aleksandra Babintseva (ROC)	10

Round of 16
2 Shori Hamada (JPN)	10
Beata Pacut (POL)	00
7 Loriana Kuka (KOS)	00
Aleksandra Babintseva (ROC)	01

Quarter-finals
2 Shori Hamada (JPN)	11
Aleksandra Babintseva (ROC)	00

=== Pool D ===
Round of 32
Karen León (VEN)	00
Patricia Sampaio (POR)	10
Otgony Mönkhtsetseg (MGL)	00
Inbar Lanir (ISR)	10

Round of 16
3 Anna-Maria Wagner (GER)	10
Patricia Sampaio (POR)	00
6 Mayra Aguiar (BRA)	10
Inbar Lanir (ISR)	00

Quarter-finals
3 Anna-Maria Wagner (GER)	01
6 Mayra Aguiar (BRA)	00
