= Karla Prodan =

Croatian judoka (born 1998)

Personal information
- Born: 29 August 1998 (age 27) Split, Croatia
- Occupation: Judoka
- Height: 178 cm (5 ft 10 in)

Sport
- Country: Croatia
- Sport: Judo
- Weight class: ‍–‍78 kg

Achievements and titles
- Olympic Games: R16 (2020)
- World Champ.: R16 (2021, 2024)
- European Champ.: (bronze) (2020)
Medal record
Women's judo
Representing Croatia
European Championships
Bronze medal – third place	2020 Prague	‍–‍78 kg
IJF Grand Slam
Silver medal – second place	2021 Tashkent	‍–‍78 kg
Bronze medal – third place	2021 Tel Aviv	‍–‍78 kg
Bronze medal – third place	2021 Baku	‍–‍78 kg
IJF Grand Prix
Silver medal – second place	2024 Zagreb	‍–‍78 kg
Bronze medal – third place	2019 Zagreb	‍–‍78 kg
Bronze medal – third place	2019 Tashkent	‍–‍78 kg
Bronze medal – third place	2019 Perth	‍–‍78 kg
Bronze medal – third place	2024 Linz	‍–‍78 kg
European U23 Championships
Silver medal – second place	2020 Poreč	‍–‍78 kg
World Juniors Championships
Silver medal – second place	2018 Nassau	‍–‍78 kg
European Junior Championships
Bronze medal – third place	2018 Sofia	‍–‍78 kg
World Cadets Championships
Gold medal – first place	2015 Sarajevo	‍–‍70 kg
European Cadet Championships
Bronze medal – third place	2015 Sofia	‍–‍70 kg

Profile at external databases
- IJF: 19097
- JudoInside.com: 84691
- Updated on 16 September 2024

Karla Prodan (born 29 August 1998) is a Croatian judoka. She won one of the bronze medals in the women's 78 kg event at the 2020 European Judo Championships held in Prague, Czech Republic. She competed in the women's 78 kg event at the 2020 Summer Olympics in Tokyo, Japan.

== Career ==
In 2019, Prodan competed in the women's 78 kg event at the World Judo Championships held in Tokyo, Japan where she was eliminated in her first match by Ma Zhenzhao of China. Prodan won gold medal in her event at the 2015 World Cadet Judo Championship in Sarajevo, Bosnia and Hercegovina as well as silver medal at the 2018 World Junior Judo Championship in Nassau, Bahamas. She also holds two bronze medals in European Championship in cadets and juniors.She also won silver medal at the 2020 European U23 Championships in Porec, Croatia.

In January 2021, Prodan was named female athlete of the year by the Croatian Olympic Committee. In the same month, she competed in the women's 78 kg event at the 2021 Judo World Masters held in Doha, Qatar. In February, Prodan won the bronze medal at 2021 Judo Grand Slam Tel Aviv in Tel Aviv, Israel. In March, she won the silver medal in her event at the 2021 Judo Grand Slam Tashkent held in Tashkent, Uzbekistan. In June, Prodan was eliminated in her second match in the women's 78 kg event at the 2021 World Judo Championships held in Budapest, Hungary.

== Achievements ==
Year	Tournament	Place	Weight class
2020	European Championships	3rd	−78 kg
