= Anna-Maria Wagner =

German judoka (born 1996)

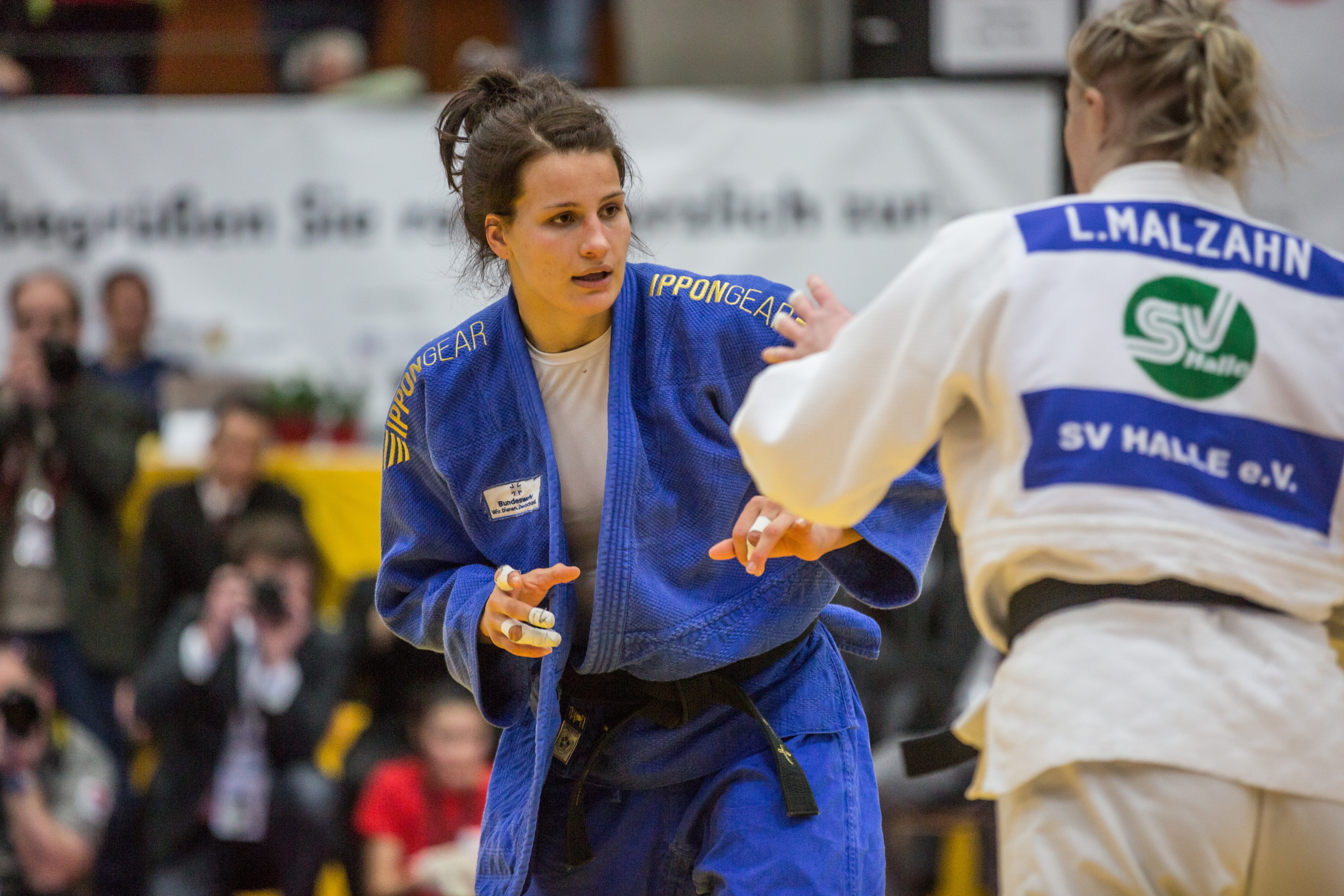
- Wagner at the German Championships 2019

Personal information
- Born: 17 May 1996 (age 30) Ravensburg, Germany
- Occupation: Judoka
- Height: 182 cm (6 ft 0 in)

Sport
- Country: Germany
- Sport: Judo
- Weight class: ‍–‍78 kg
- Rank: 4th dan black belt

Achievements and titles
- Olympic Games: (bronze) (2020)
- World Champ.: (2021, 2024)
- European Champ.: (silver) (2024)
- Highest world ranking: 1^{st}
Medal record
Women's judo
Representing Germany
Olympic Games
Bronze medal – third place	2020 Tokyo	‍–‍78 kg
Bronze medal – third place	2020 Tokyo	Mixed team
World Championships
Gold medal – first place	2021 Budapest	‍–‍78 kg
Gold medal – first place	2024 Abu Dhabi	‍–‍78 kg
Bronze medal – third place	2022 Tashkent	Mixed team
European Championships
Silver medal – second place	2024 Zagreb	‍–‍78 kg
Bronze medal – third place	2018 Tel Aviv	‍–‍78 kg
World Masters
Bronze medal – third place	2019 Qingdao	‍–‍78 kg
IJF Grand Slam
Gold medal – first place	2021 Tel Aviv	‍–‍78 kg
Gold medal – first place	2021 Kazan	‍–‍78 kg
Gold medal – first place	2022 Antalya	‍–‍78 kg
Gold medal – first place	2022 Tbilisi	‍–‍78 kg
Gold medal – first place	2023 Tbilisi	‍–‍78 kg
Gold medal – first place	2023 Baku	‍–‍78 kg
Gold medal – first place	2024 Paris	‍–‍78 kg
Gold medal – first place	2024 Dushanbe	‍–‍78 kg
Silver medal – second place	2016 Abu Dhabi	‍–‍78 kg
Silver medal – second place	2019 Düsseldorf	‍–‍78 kg
Silver medal – second place	2019 Baku	‍–‍78 kg
Bronze medal – third place	2017 Ekaterinburg	‍–‍78 kg
Bronze medal – third place	2018 Ekaterinburg	‍–‍78 kg
Bronze medal – third place	2019 Brasilia	‍–‍78 kg
Bronze medal – third place	2020 Düsseldorf	‍–‍78 kg
Bronze medal – third place	2023 Abu Dhabi	‍–‍78 kg
Bronze medal – third place	2024 Tashkent	‍–‍78 kg
Bronze medal – third place	2024 Antalya	‍–‍78 kg
IJF Grand Prix
Gold medal – first place	2019 Marrakesh	‍–‍78 kg
Gold medal – first place	2019 Antalya	‍–‍78 kg
Gold medal – first place	2023 Linz	‍–‍78 kg
Silver medal – second place	2019 Hohhot	‍–‍78 kg
Silver medal – second place	2023 Dushanbe	‍–‍78 kg
Bronze medal – third place	2018 Zagreb	‍–‍78 kg
Bronze medal – third place	2023 Zagreb	‍–‍78 kg
European U23 Championships
Gold medal – first place	2017 Podgorica	‍–‍78 kg
World Juniors Championships
Bronze medal – third place	2015 Abu Dhabi	‍–‍78 kg
European Junior Championships
Gold medal – first place	2016 Málaga	‍–‍78 kg

Profile at external databases
- IJF: 17189
- JudoInside.com: 74326
- Updated on 22 May 2024

Anna-Maria Wagner (born 17 May 1996) is a German judoka. She won the gold medal in the women's 78 kg event at the 2021 World Judo Championships held in Budapest, Hungary. She also won one of the bronze medals in both the women's 78 kg and mixed team events at the 2020 Summer Olympics held in Tokyo, Japan.

In 2018, Wagner won one of the bronze medals in her event at the European Judo Championships held in Tel Aviv, Israel. She also competed at the World Judo Championships in 2017, 2018 and 2019.

In 2021, Wagner competed in the women's 78 kg event at the Judo World Masters held in Doha, Qatar. A month later, she won the gold medal in her event at the 2021 Judo Grand Slam Tel Aviv held in Tel Aviv, Israel. On 23 July 2024, Wagner was chosen as the flag bearer, together with basketball player Dennis Schröder at Paris 2024.

Wagner won the gold medal in her event at the 2022 Judo Grand Slam Antalya held in Antalya, Turkey.

== Career ==
Anna-Maria Wagner started practicing judo in the 2nd grade. After her first class, she signed up with a club immediately. Wagner won the Judo World Championship defeating the number one ranked competitor from France, Madeleine Malonga, to capture the gold medal.

Upon winning the World Championship, Anna-Maria Wagner punched her ticket to The Olympic Games in Tokyo.

Olympic Games
Preceded by Laura Ludwig; Patrick Hausding	Flagbearer for Germany; París 2024; With: Dennis Schröder	Succeeded by Incumbent
