= Ma Zhenzhao =

Chinese judoka (born 1997)

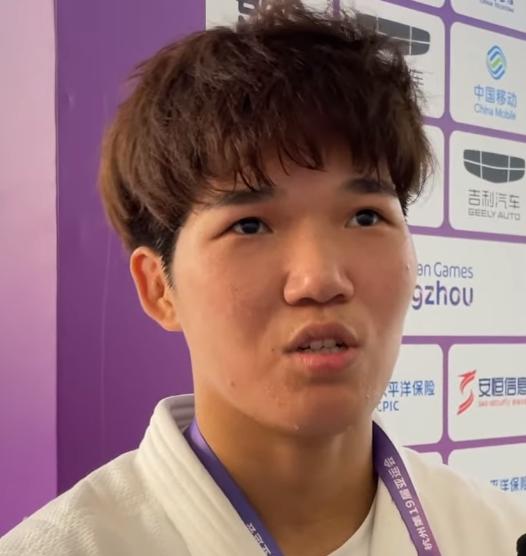
- Ma in 2023

Personal information
- Native name: 马振昭
- Born: 5 November 1997 (age 28) Binzhou, Shandong, China
- Occupation: Judoka

Sport
- Country: China
- Sport: Judo
- Weight class: ‍–‍78 kg

Achievements and titles
- Olympic Games: (bronze) (2024)
- World Champ.: (silver) (2022)
- Asian Champ.: (gold) (2023)
Medal record
Women's judo
Representing China
Olympic Games
| Bronze medal – third place | 2024 Paris | ‍–‍78 kg |
World Championships
| Silver medal – second place | 2022 Tashkent | ‍–‍78 kg |
Asian Games
| Gold medal – first place | 2023 Hangzhou | ‍–‍78 kg |
| Bronze medal – third place | 2018 Jakarta | ‍–‍78 kg |
| Bronze medal – third place | 2023 Hangzhou | Mixed team |
Asian Championships
| Silver medal – second place | 2017 Hong Kong | ‍–‍78 kg |
| Silver medal – second place | 2019 Fujairah | ‍–‍78 kg |
| Silver medal – second place | 2021 Bishkek | ‍–‍78 kg |
| Bronze medal – third place | 2022 Nur‑Sultan | ‍–‍78 kg |
IJF Grand Slam
| Gold medal – first place | 2022 Abu Dhabi | ‍–‍78 kg |
| Gold medal – first place | 2024 Astana | ‍–‍78 kg |
| Gold medal – first place | 2025 Tashkent | ‍–‍78 kg |
| Bronze medal – third place | 2018 Abu Dhabi | ‍–‍78 kg |
| Bronze medal – third place | 2021 Tbilisi | ‍–‍78 kg |
| Bronze medal – third place | 2023 Tashkent | ‍–‍78 kg |
| Bronze medal – third place | 2024 Antalya | ‍–‍78 kg |
IJF Grand Prix
| Bronze medal – third place | 2016 Qingdao | ‍–‍78 kg |
| Bronze medal – third place | 2019 Hohhot | ‍–‍78 kg |

Profile at external databases
- IJF: 39826
- JudoInside.com: 109656
- Updated on 2 March 2025

Ma Zhenzhao (Chinese: 马振昭; pinyin: Mǎ Zhènzhāo, born 5 November 1997) is a Chinese judoka.

== Career ==
Ma won one of the bronze medals in the women's 78 kg event at the 2018 Asian Games held in Jakarta, Indonesia. At the 2019 Asian-Pacific Judo Championships held in Fujairah, United Arab Emirates, she won the silver medal in the women's 78 kg event.

In 2019, Ma competed in the women's 78 kg event at the World Judo Championships held in Tokyo, Japan.

In 2021, Ma competed in the women's 78 kg event at the 2020 Summer Olympics in Tokyo, Japan. She was eliminated in her first match by Bernadette Graf of Austria.

In 2023, she lost her bronze medal match in the women's 78 kg event at the World Judo Championships held in Doha, Qatar.
