= Loriana Kuka =

Kosovo judoka (born 1997)

Personal information
- Nationality: Kosovan
- Born: 5 April 1997 (age 29)
- Occupation: Judoka

Sport
- Country: Kosovo
- Sport: Judo
- Weight class: –70 kg, –78 kg

Achievements and titles
- Olympic Games: R16 (2020, 2024)
- World Champ.: (bronze) (2019)
- European Champ.: (bronze) (2019, 2020)
Medal record
Women's judo
Representing Kosovo
World Championships
Bronze medal – third place	2019 Tokyo	‍–‍78 kg
European Games
Bronze medal – third place	2019 Minsk	‍–‍78 kg
European Championships
Bronze medal – third place	2020 Prague	‍–‍78 kg
World Masters
Bronze medal – third place	2021 Doha	‍–‍78 kg
IJF Grand Slam
Bronze medal – third place	2020 Budapest	‍–‍78 kg
Bronze medal – third place	2022 Abu Dhabi	‍–‍78 kg
Bronze medal – third place	2022 Baku	‍–‍78 kg
IJF Grand Prix
Gold medal – first place	2018 Antalya	‍–‍78 kg
Gold medal – first place	2018 Tashkent	‍–‍78 kg
Gold medal – first place	2019 Tbilisi	‍–‍78 kg
Silver medal – second place	2019 Tel Aviv	‍–‍78 kg
Silver medal – second place	2019 Marrakesh	‍–‍78 kg
Bronze medal – third place	2023 Almada	‍–‍78 kg
Bronze medal – third place	2023 Dushanbe	‍–‍70 kg
European U23 Championships
Gold medal – first place	2018 Győr	‍–‍78 kg
Mediterranean Games
Gold medal – first place	2022 Oran	‍–‍78 kg
Silver medal – second place	2018 Tarragona	‍–‍78 kg

Profile at external databases
- IJF: 36151
- JudoInside.com: 87072
- Updated on 3 August 2024

Loriana Kuka (born 5 April 1997) is a Kosovan judoka. She won Judo Grand Prix in Tbilisi (2019), Tashkent (2018) and Antalya (2018). She represented Kosovo at the 2019 European Games in Minsk and won the bronze medal in ‍–‍78 kg. She won the bronze medal in the 2019 World Championships in Tokyo

In 2021, she won one of the bronze medals in her event at the 2021 Judo World Masters held in Doha, Qatar. She competed in the women's 78 kg event at the 2020 Summer Olympics in Tokyo, Japan.

She won the gold medal in the women's 78 kg event at the 2022 Mediterranean Games held in Oran, Algeria.

== Medals record ==
2018
(gold) Grand Prix − 78 kg, Antalya
(gold) Grand Prix − 78 kg, Tashkent
(silver) Mediterranean Games − 78 kg, Tarragona

2019
(silver) Grand Prix − 78 kg, Tel Aviv
(silver) Grand Prix − 78 kg, Marrakesh
(gold) Grand Prix − 78 kg, Tbilisi
(bronze) European Games − 78 kg, Minsk
(bronze) World Championships− 78 kg, Tokyo
