= Antonina Shmeleva =

Russian judoka (born 1994)

Personal information
- Nationality: Russian
- Born: 25 July 1994 (age 31)
- Occupation: Judoka

Sport
- Country: Russia
- Sport: Judo
- Weight class: –78 kg

Achievements and titles
- World Champ.: R16 (2021)
- European Champ.: 7th (2020)
Medal record
Women's judo
Representing Russia
IJF Grand Slam
| Bronze medal – third place | 2021 Antalya | –78 kg |
IJF Grand Prix
| Gold medal – first place | 2018 The Hague | –78 kg |
| Silver medal – second place | 2019 Tashkent | –78 kg |
| Bronze medal – third place | 2016 Zagreb | –78 kg |
European U23 Championships
| Silver medal – second place | 2016 Tel Aviv | –78 kg |

Profile at external databases
- IJF: 14919
- JudoInside.com: 81056
- Updated on 21 November 2022

Antonina Shmeleva (born 25 July 1994) is a Russian judoka.

She is the gold medallist of the 2018 Judo Grand Prix The Hague in the -78 kg category.
