= Yoon Hyun-ji =

South Korean judoka (born 1994)

Personal information
- Nickname: Yoon Tiger
- Born: 14 February 1994 (age 32) Cheorwon, South Korea
- Occupation: Judoka

Korean name
- Hangul: 윤현지
- RR: Yun Hyeonji
- MR: Yun Hyŏnji

Sport
- Country: South Korea
- Sport: Judo
- Weight class: ‍–‍78 kg

Achievements and titles
- Olympic Games: 5th (2020)
- World Champ.: 7th (2015)
- Asian Champ.: (gold) (2021)
Medal record
Women's judo
Representing South Korea
Olympic Games
Bronze medal – third place	2024 Paris	Mixed team
Asian Games
Bronze medal – third place	2023 Hangzhou	‍–‍78 kg
Asian Championships
Gold medal – first place	2021 Bishkek	‍–‍78 kg
Silver medal – second place	2024 Hong Kong	‍–‍78 kg
Bronze medal – third place	2015 Kuwait City	‍–‍78 kg
Bronze medal – third place	2019 Fujairah	‍–‍78 kg
IJF Grand Slam
Bronze medal – third place	2012 Tokyo	‍–‍78 kg
Bronze medal – third place	2023 Tokyo	‍–‍78 kg
IJF Grand Prix
Gold medal – first place	2022 Almada	‍–‍78 kg
Bronze medal – third place	2020 Tel Aviv	‍–‍78 kg
World Juniors Championships
Silver medal – second place	2011 Cape Town	‍–‍78 kg
Asian Junior Championships
Silver medal – second place	2012 Taipei	‍–‍78 kg

Profile at external databases
- IJF: 9717
- JudoInside.com: 58524
- Updated on 26 April 2024

Yoon Hyun-ji (born 14 February 1994) is a South Korean judoka. In 2021, she competed in the women's 78 kg event at the 2020 Summer Olympics in Tokyo, Japan.

Yoon is the gold medalist of the 2021 Asian-Pacific Judo Championships in the ‍–‍78 kg category.

In 2022, Yoon won the gold medal in her event at the Judo Grand Prix Almada held in Almada, Portugal.
