= Anastasiya Turchyn =

Ukrainian judoka (born 1995)

Personal information
- Nationality: Ukrainian
- Born: 3 January 1995 (age 31)
- Occupation: Judoka

Sport
- Country: Ukraine
- Sport: Judo
- Weight class: –78 kg

Achievements and titles
- Olympic Games: R16 (2020)
- World Champ.: 5th (2021)
- European Champ.: 7th (2017, 2022)
Medal record
Women's judo
Representing Ukraine
IJF Grand Slam
Bronze medal – third place	2016 Abu Dhabi	–78 kg
Bronze medal – third place	2021 Kazan	–78 kg
IJF Grand Prix
Gold medal – first place	2017 Tbilisi	–78 kg
Gold medal – first place	2017 Tashkent	–78 kg
Silver medal – second place	2018 Agadir	–78 kg
Silver medal – second place	2018 Tbilisi	–78 kg
Silver medal – second place	2018 Antalya	–78 kg
Bronze medal – third place	2019 Antalya	–78 kg
European U23 Championships
Gold medal – first place	2013 Samokov	–78 kg
Gold medal – first place	2016 Tel Aviv	–78 kg
Silver medal – second place	2017 Podgorica	–78 kg
Bronze medal – third place	2014 Wrocław	–78 kg
European Junior Championships
Gold medal – first place	2014 Bucharest	–78 kg
Bronze medal – third place	2013 Sarajevo	–78 kg
World Cadets Championships
Bronze medal – third place	2011 Kyiv	+70 kg
European Cadet Championships
Gold medal – first place	2011 Cottonera	+70 kg

Profile at external databases
- IJF: 8427
- JudoInside.com: 66010
- Updated on 21 November 2022

Anastasiya Turchyn (Анастасія Турчин; born 3 January 1995) is a Ukrainian judoka. She is the bronze medalist of the 2021 Judo Grand Slam Kazan in the -78 kg category. She competed in the women's 78 kg event at the 2020 Summer Olympics in Tokyo, Japan. Anastasiya was born in Rivne to Brazilian and Ukrainian parents.
