= Luise Malzahn =

German judoka (born 1990)

Personal information
- Nationality: German
- Born: 9 January 1990 (age 36) Halle, East Germany
- Occupation: Judoka
- Website: www.malzahnjudo.de

Sport
- Country: Germany
- Sport: Judo
- Weight class: –78 kg
- Retired: October 2022

Achievements and titles
- Olympic Games: 5th (2016)
- World Champ.: (bronze) (2015)
- European Champ.: (silver) (2015, 2020)
Medal record
Women's judo
Representing Germany
World Championships
Bronze medal – third place	2015 Astana	‍–‍78 kg
European Games
Silver medal – second place	2015 Baku	‍–‍78 kg
European Championships
Silver medal – second place	2020 Prague	‍–‍78 kg
Bronze medal – third place	2011 Istanbul	‍–‍78 kg
Bronze medal – third place	2016 Kazan	‍–‍78 kg
World Masters
Bronze medal – third place	2015 Rabat	‍–‍78 kg
IJF Grand Slam
Gold medal – first place	2014 Abu Dhabi	‍–‍78 kg
Gold medal – first place	2019 Baku	‍–‍78 kg
Gold medal – first place	2021 Baku	‍–‍78 kg
Silver medal – second place	2013 Baku	‍–‍78 kg
Silver medal – second place	2018 Ekaterinburg	‍–‍78 kg
Silver medal – second place	2019 Paris	‍–‍78 kg
Silver medal – second place	2019 Abu Dhabi	‍–‍78 kg
Bronze medal – third place	2012 Moscow	‍–‍78 kg
Bronze medal – third place	2015 Tyumen	‍–‍78 kg
Bronze medal – third place	2016 Paris	‍–‍78 kg
Bronze medal – third place	2016 Baku	‍–‍78 kg
Bronze medal – third place	2021 Kazan	‍–‍78 kg
Bronze medal – third place	2021 Paris	‍–‍78 kg
IJF Grand Prix
Gold medal – first place	2013 Samsun	‍–‍78 kg
Gold medal – first place	2014 Düsseldorf	‍–‍78 kg
Gold medal – first place	2014 Samsun	‍–‍78 kg
Silver medal – second place	2011 Baku	‍–‍78 kg
Silver medal – second place	2013 Miami	‍–‍78 kg
Silver medal – second place	2014 Ulaanbaatar	‍–‍78 kg
Silver medal – second place	2014 Astana	‍–‍78 kg
Silver medal – second place	2014 Jeju	‍–‍78 kg
Silver medal – second place	2016 Havana	‍–‍78 kg
Silver medal – second place	2016 Düsseldorf	‍–‍78 kg
Silver medal – second place	2019 Perth	‍–‍78 kg
Bronze medal – third place	2009 Qingdao	‍–‍78 kg
Bronze medal – third place	2011 Amsterdam	‍–‍78 kg
Bronze medal – third place	2014 Havana	‍–‍78 kg
Bronze medal – third place	2014 Tashkent	‍–‍78 kg
Bronze medal – third place	2015 Samsun	‍–‍78 kg
Bronze medal – third place	2015 Budapest	‍–‍78 kg
Bronze medal – third place	2017 Zagreb	‍–‍78 kg
Bronze medal – third place	2017 The Hague	‍–‍78 kg
Bronze medal – third place	2018 Tashkent	‍–‍78 kg
Bronze medal – third place	2019 Marrakesh	‍–‍78 kg
Bronze medal – third place	2019 Antalya	‍–‍78 kg
World Juniors Championships
Bronze medal – third place	2009 Paris	‍–‍78 kg
European Cadet Championships
Gold medal – first place	2006 Miskolc	+70 kg

Profile at external databases
- IJF: 1237
- JudoInside.com: 32193
- Updated on 3 July 2023

Luise Malzahn (born 9 January 1990) is a German retired judoka. She competed at the 2016 Summer Olympics in Rio de Janeiro, in the women's 78 kg. She finished in 5th place after losing to Anamari Velenšek of Slovenia in the bronze medal match.
