= 2021 Judo World Masters =

Judo competition

Judo 2021 Judo World Masters
- Venue: Lusail Sports Arena, Doha
- Location: Doha, Qatar
- Dates: 11–13 January 2021
- Competitors: 398 from 69 nations
- Total prize money: 200,000€

Competition at external databases
- Links: IJF • EJU • JudoInside

The 2021 Judo World Masters was held in Doha, Qatar, from 11 to 13 January 2021.

== Medal summary ==
=== Medal table ===
Rank	Nation	Gold	Silver	Bronze	Total
1	France (FRA)	5	1	1	7
2	South Korea (KOR)	3	0	0	3
3	Japan (JPN)	2	5	0	7
4	Georgia (GEO)	2	1	2	5
5	Netherlands (NED)	1	1	5	7
6	Kosovo (KOS)	1	0	3	4
7	Russia (RUS)	0	2	3	5
8	Azerbaijan (AZE)	0	2	0	2
9	Israel (ISR)	0	1	2	3
10	Chinese Taipei (TPE)	0	1	0	1
11	Germany (GER)	0	0	3	3
12	Ukraine (UKR)	0	0	2	2
13	Bulgaria (BUL)	0	0	1	1
13	Canada (CAN)	0	0	1	1
13	Mongolia (MGL)	0	0	1	1
13	Slovenia (SLO)	0	0	1	1
13	Tunisia (TUN)	0	0	1	1
13	Turkey (TUR)	0	0	1	1
13	Uzbekistan (UZB)	0	0	1	1
Totals (19 entries)		14	14	28	56

=== Men's events ===
Event	Gold	Silver	Bronze
Extra-lightweight (-60 kg)	(South Korea) Kim Won-jin	(Chinese Taipei) Yang Yung-wei	(Netherlands) Tornike Tsjakadoea
Extra-lightweight (-60 kg)	(South Korea) Kim Won-jin	(Chinese Taipei) Yang Yung-wei	(Russia) Albert Oguzov
Half-lightweight (-66 kg)	(South Korea) An Baul	(Israel) Baruch Shmailov	(Russia) Aram Grigoryan
Half-lightweight (-66 kg)	(South Korea) An Baul	(Israel) Baruch Shmailov	(Georgia (country)) Vazha Margvelashvili
Lightweight (-73 kg)	(South Korea) An Chang-rim	(Japan) Soichi Hashimoto	(Germany) Igor Wandtke
Lightweight (-73 kg)	(South Korea) An Chang-rim	(Japan) Soichi Hashimoto	(Uzbekistan) Khikmatillokh Turaev
Half-middleweight (-81 kg)	(Georgia (country)) Tato Grigalashvili	(Netherlands) Frank de Wit	(Bulgaria) Ivaylo Ivanov
Half-middleweight (-81 kg)	(Georgia (country)) Tato Grigalashvili	(Netherlands) Frank de Wit	(Israel) Sagi Muki
Middleweight (-90 kg)	(Netherlands) Noël van 't End	(Georgia (country)) Beka Gviniashvili	(Germany) Eduard Trippel
Middleweight (-90 kg)	(Netherlands) Noël van 't End	(Georgia (country)) Beka Gviniashvili	(Georgia (country)) Lasha Bekauri
Half-heavyweight (-100 kg)	(Georgia (country)) Varlam Liparteliani	(Azerbaijan) Zelym Kotsoiev	(Russia) Arman Adamian
Half-heavyweight (-100 kg)	(Georgia (country)) Varlam Liparteliani	(Azerbaijan) Zelym Kotsoiev	(Israel) Peter Paltchik
Heavyweight (+100 kg)	(France) Teddy Riner	(Russia) Inal Tasoev	(Netherlands) Henk Grol
Heavyweight (+100 kg)	(France) Teddy Riner	(Russia) Inal Tasoev	(Ukraine) Iakiv Khammo

=== Women's events ===
Event	Gold	Silver	Bronze
Extra-lightweight (-48 kg)	(Kosovo) Distria Krasniqi	(Japan) Funa Tonaki	(Ukraine) Daria Bilodid
Extra-lightweight (-48 kg)	(Kosovo) Distria Krasniqi	(Japan) Funa Tonaki	(Mongolia) Mönkhbatyn Urantsetseg
Half-lightweight (-52 kg)	(France) Amandine Buchard	(Japan) Ai Shishime	(France) Astride Gneto
Half-lightweight (-52 kg)	(France) Amandine Buchard	(Japan) Ai Shishime	(Kosovo) Majlinda Kelmendi
Lightweight (-57 kg)	(Japan) Tsukasa Yoshida	(France) Sarah-Léonie Cysique	(Kosovo) Nora Gjakova
Lightweight (-57 kg)	(Japan) Tsukasa Yoshida	(France) Sarah-Léonie Cysique	(Canada) Jessica Klimkait
Half-middleweight (-63 kg)	(France) Clarisse Agbegnenou	(Japan) Nami Nabekura	(Netherlands) Sanne Vermeer
Half-middleweight (-63 kg)	(France) Clarisse Agbegnenou	(Japan) Nami Nabekura	(Slovenia) Andreja Leški
Middleweight (-70 kg)	(Japan) Yoko Ono	(Russia) Madina Taimazova	(Netherlands) Kim Polling
Middleweight (-70 kg)	(Japan) Yoko Ono	(Russia) Madina Taimazova	(Germany) Giovanna Scoccimarro
Half-heavyweight (-78 kg)	(France) Madeleine Malonga	(Japan) Shori Hamada	(Netherlands) Guusje Steenhuis
Half-heavyweight (-78 kg)	(France) Madeleine Malonga	(Japan) Shori Hamada	(Kosovo) Loriana Kuka
Heavyweight (+78 kg)	(France) Romane Dicko	(Azerbaijan) Iryna Kindzerska	(Tunisia) Nihel Cheikh Rouhou
Heavyweight (+78 kg)	(France) Romane Dicko	(Azerbaijan) Iryna Kindzerska	(Turkey) Kayra Sayit

=== Prize money ===
The sums written are per medalist, and with the two additional best male and female judoka of 2,000€ each, bring the total prizes awarded to 200,000€. (retrieved from:)

Medal	Total	Judoka	Coach
Gold	6,000€	4,800€	1,200€
Silver	4,000€	3,200€	800€
Bronze	2,000€	1,600€	400€
