= Marhinde Verkerk =

Dutch judoka (born 1985)

Personal information
- Nationality: Dutch
- Born: 21 November 1985 (age 40) Rotterdam, Netherlands
- Occupation: Judoka
- Height: 1.72 m (5 ft 8 in)

Sport
- Country: Netherlands
- Sport: Judo
- Weight class: ‍–‍78 kg

Achievements and titles
- Olympic Games: 5th (2012)
- World Champ.: (2009)
- European Champ.: (gold) (2015)
Medal record
Women's judo
Representing the Netherlands
World Championships
Gold medal – first place	2009 Rotterdam	‍–‍78 kg
Silver medal – second place	2013 Rio de Janeiro	‍–‍78 kg
Bronze medal – third place	2015 Astana	‍–‍78 kg
Bronze medal – third place	2018 Baku	‍–‍78 kg
European Games
Gold medal – first place	2015 Baku	‍–‍78 kg
European Championships
Silver medal – second place	2010 Vienna	‍–‍78 kg
Silver medal – second place	2014 Montpellier	‍–‍78 kg
Bronze medal – third place	2013 Budapest	‍–‍78 kg
World Masters
Gold medal – first place	2017 Saint Petersburg	‍–‍78 kg
IJF Grand Slam
Gold medal – first place	2013 Tokyo	‍–‍78 kg
Gold medal – first place	2015 Abu Dhabi	‍–‍78 kg
Silver medal – second place	2009 Paris	‍–‍78 kg
Silver medal – second place	2016 Baku	‍–‍78 kg
Silver medal – second place	2017 Baku	‍–‍78 kg
Silver medal – second place	2017 Abu Dhabi	‍–‍78 kg
Bronze medal – third place	2013 Moscow	‍–‍78 kg
Bronze medal – third place	2014 Paris	‍–‍78 kg
Bronze medal – third place	2021 Tel Aviv	‍–‍78 kg
IJF Grand Prix
Gold medal – first place	2014 Budapest	‍–‍78 kg
Gold medal – first place	2016 Tbilisi	‍–‍78 kg
Silver medal – second place	2011 Abu Dhabi	‍–‍78 kg
Silver medal – second place	2017 The Hague	‍–‍78 kg
Bronze medal – third place	2010 Qingdao	‍–‍78 kg
Bronze medal – third place	2011 Düsseldorf	‍–‍78 kg
Bronze medal – third place	2011 Baku	‍–‍78 kg
Bronze medal – third place	2012 Düsseldorf	‍–‍78 kg
Bronze medal – third place	2013 Düsseldorf	‍–‍78 kg
Bronze medal – third place	2015 Budapest	‍–‍78 kg
Bronze medal – third place	2019 Zagreb	‍–‍78 kg
European U23 Championships
Gold medal – first place	2006 Moscow	‍–‍78 kg
Bronze medal – third place	2005 Kyiv	‍–‍78 kg
European Junior Championships
Bronze medal – third place	2004 Sofia	‍–‍78 kg

Profile at external databases
- IJF: 288
- JudoInside.com: 15499
- Updated on 23 May 2023

Marhinde Verkerk (born 21 November 1985) is a Dutch retired judoka.

== Career ==
Verkerk won the World Judo Championships Women's −78 kg in 2009, in her hometown of Rotterdam. In 2013, she won silver at the World Championships in Rio de Janeiro, Brazil, and then in 2015, she won the bronze medal.

She competed at the 2012 Summer Olympics in the -78 kg event. She lost to Gemma Gibbons in the quarter-finals and then to Mayra Aguiar in her bronze medal match.

After winning silver, bronze and again silver at the European Championships in 2010, 2013 and 2014, respectively, Verkerk finally won European gold in 2015. As the European Championships were held during the 2015 European Games, this also meant she won the inaugural gold medal in the women's −78 kg division at these championships.
