= Kaliema Antomarchi =

Cuban judoka (born 1988)

Personal information
- Full name: Kaliema Antomarchi Ortega
- Born: 25 April 1988 (age 38) Santiago de Cuba, Cuba
- Occupation: Judoka

Sport
- Country: Cuba
- Sport: Judo
- Weight class: –78 kg

Achievements and titles
- Olympic Games: 5th (2020)
- World Champ.: (bronze) (2017)
- Pan American Champ.: (2009, 2018)
Medal record
Women's judo
Representing Cuba
World Championships
Bronze medal – third place	2017 Budapest	‍–‍78 kg
Pan American Games
Silver medal – second place	2019 Lima	‍–‍78 kg
Pan American Championships
Gold medal – first place	2009 Buenos Aires	‍–‍78 kg
Gold medal – first place	2018 San José	‍–‍78 kg
Silver medal – second place	2017 Panama City	‍–‍78 kg
Silver medal – second place	2019 Lima	‍–‍78 kg
Silver medal – second place	2021 Guadalajara	‍–‍78 kg
Bronze medal – third place	2015 Edmonton	‍–‍78 kg
Bronze medal – third place	2016 Havana	‍–‍78 kg
IJF Grand Slam
Gold medal – first place	2019 Brasilia	‍–‍78 kg
Bronze medal – third place	2018 Osaka	‍–‍78 kg
Bronze medal – third place	2020 Paris	‍–‍78 kg
IJF Grand Prix
Silver medal – second place	2019 Tbilisi	‍–‍78 kg
Silver medal – second place	2019 Antalya	‍–‍78 kg
Bronze medal – third place	2017 Cancún	‍–‍78 kg
Bronze medal – third place	2018 Cancún	‍–‍78 kg
Bronze medal – third place	2019 Hohhot	‍–‍78 kg
Bronze medal – third place	2019 Budapest	‍–‍78 kg
Summer Universiade
Bronze medal – third place	2009 Belgrade	‍–‍78 kg

Profile at external databases
- IJF: 4106
- JudoInside.com: 44436
- Updated on 27 June 2023

Kaliema Antomarchi Ortega (born 25 April 1988) is a Cuban judoka.

Antomarchi won a bronze medal at the 2017 World Judo Championships in Budapest.

Antomarchi represented Cuba at the 2020 Summer Olympics. She competed in the women's 78 kg event.
