= Klara Apotekar =

Slovenian judoka (born 1997)

Personal information
- Born: 2 August 1997 (age 28)
- Occupation: Judoka

Sport
- Country: Slovenia
- Sport: Judo
- Weight class: –78 kg

Achievements and titles
- World Champ.: 5th (2019)
- European Champ.: (gold) (2019)
Medal record
Women's judo
Representing Slovenia
European Games
| Gold medal – first place | 2019 Minsk | ‍–‍78 kg |
IJF Grand Slam
| Gold medal – first place | 2019 Abu Dhabi | ‍–‍78 kg |
| Silver medal – second place | 2016 Tyumen | ‍–‍78 kg |
| Bronze medal – third place | 2018 Düsseldorf | ‍–‍78 kg |
| Bronze medal – third place | 2019 Düsseldorf | ‍–‍78 kg |
IJF Grand Prix
| Gold medal – first place | 2019 Tel Aviv | ‍–‍78 kg |
| Silver medal – second place | 2018 Zagreb | ‍–‍78 kg |
| Bronze medal – third place | 2017 Düsseldorf | ‍–‍78 kg |
| Bronze medal – third place | 2018 Tunis | ‍–‍78 kg |
European U23 Championships
| Gold medal – first place | 2015 Bratislava | ‍–‍78 kg |
| Silver medal – second place | 2014 Wrocław | ‍–‍78 kg |
World Juniors Championships
| Silver medal – second place | 2015 Abu Dhabi | ‍–‍78 kg |
European Junior Championships
| Gold medal – first place | 2017 Maribor | ‍–‍78 kg |
Military World Games
| Gold medal – first place | 2019 Wuhan | ‍–‍78 kg |

Profile at external databases
- IJF: 14770
- JudoInside.com: 73741
- Updated on 21 May 2023

Klara Apotekar (born 2 August 1997) is a Slovenian judoka. She won the gold medal in the women's 78 kg event at the 2019 European Judo Championships which were held as part of the 2019 European Games in Minsk, Belarus.

Apotekar also won the gold medal in the women's 78 kg event at the 2019 Military World Games held in Wuhan, China.
