= Aleksandra Babintseva =

Russian judoka (born 1993)

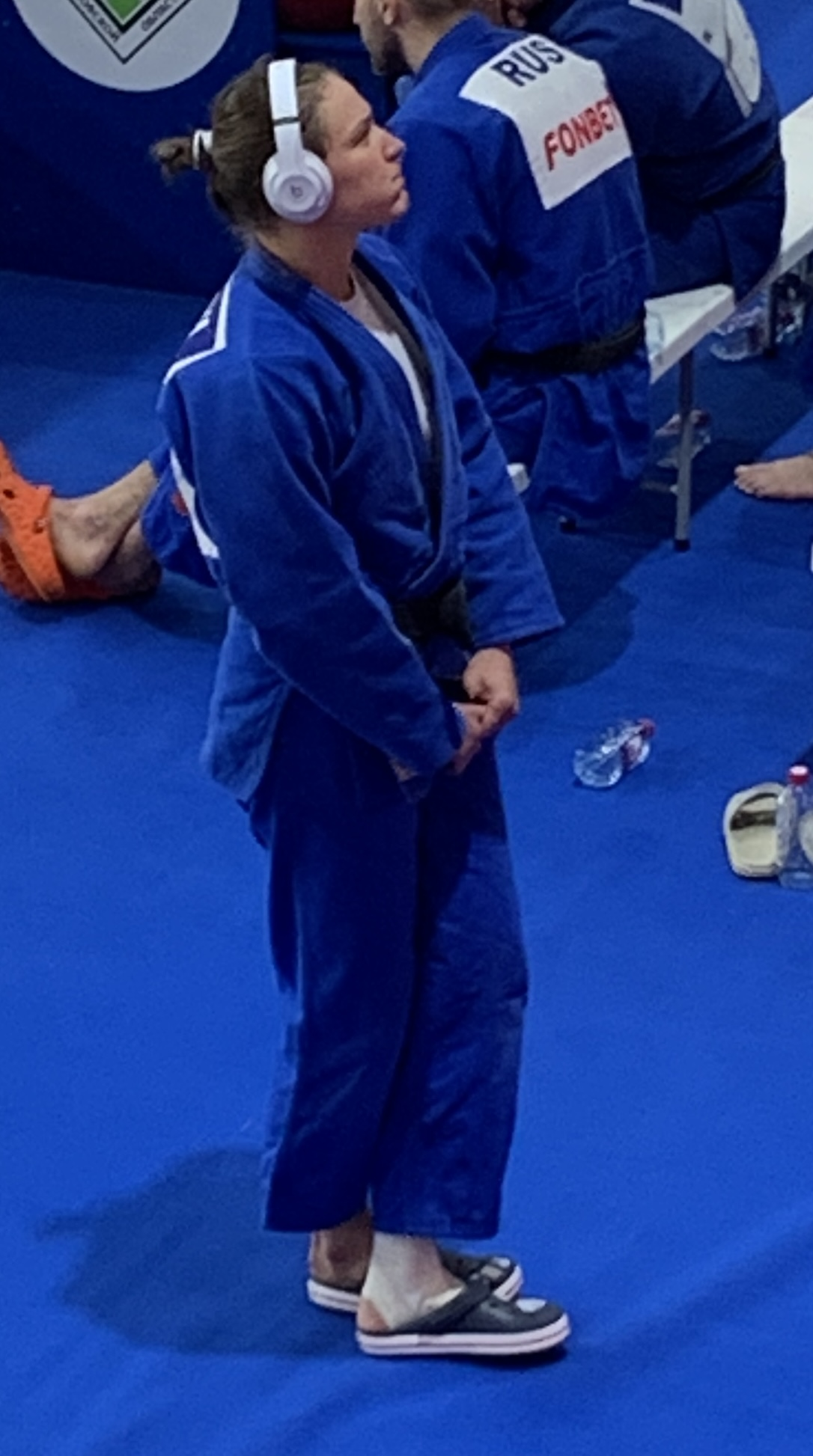

Personal information
- Full name: Aleksandra Ivanovna Babintseva
- Born: 4 February 1993 (age 33) Kirov, Russia
- Occupation: Judoka
- Military career
- Allegiance: Russia
- Branch: Russian Armed Forces
- Rank: Lieutenant

Sport
- Country: Russia
- Sport: Judo
- Weight class: ‍–‍78 kg

Achievements and titles
- Olympic Games: 7th (2020)
- World Champ.: (bronze) (2018)
- European Champ.: 5th (2026)
Medal record
Women's judo
Representing the IJF
IJF Grand Slam
Bronze medal – third place	2025 Ulaanbaatar	‍–‍78 kg
Representing Individual Neutral Athletes
IJF Grand Prix
Bronze medal – third place	2023 Dushanbe	‍–‍78 kg
Representing Russia
World Championships
Bronze medal – third place	2018 Baku	‍–‍78 kg
European Games
Gold medal – first place	2019 Minsk	Mixed team
IJF Grand Slam
Gold medal – first place	2021 Paris	‍–‍78 kg
Bronze medal – third place	2016 Tyumen	‍–‍78 kg
Bronze medal – third place	2026 Tashkent	‍–‍78 kg
IJF Grand Prix
Silver medal – second place	2019 Montreal	‍–‍78 kg
Bronze medal – third place	2019 Tel Aviv	‍–‍78 kg
European U23 Championships
Silver medal – second place	2014 Wrocław	+78 kg
Bronze medal – third place	2012 Prague	+78 kg
European Junior Championships
Gold medal – first place	2012 Poreč	+78 kg
Bronze medal – third place	2011 Lommel	+78 kg
Summer Universiade
Bronze medal – third place	2013 Kazan	Women's team
Bronze medal – third place	2015 Gwangju	Open
Bronze medal – third place	2015 Gwangju	Women's team
Bronze medal – third place	2017 Taipei	‍–‍78 kg
Bronze medal – third place	2017 Taipei	Women's team

Profile at external databases
- IJF: 9806
- JudoInside.com: 64981
- Updated on 19 April 2026

Aleksandra Ivanovna Babintseva (Russian: Александра Ивановна Бабинцева; born 4 February 1993) is a Russian judoka.

Babintseva participated at the 2018 World Judo Championships, winning a medal in the ‍–‍78 kg event.

Babintseva is a lieutenant of the Russian Armed Forces. She is a member of the army sports club CSKA Moscow and a medal winner from the Military World Games.
