= Madeleine Malonga =

French judoka (born 1993)

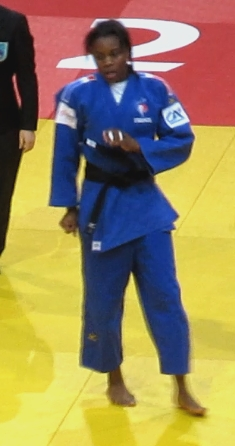
- Malonga in 2018

Personal information
- Born: 25 December 1993 (age 32) Soisy-sous-Montmorency, France
- Occupation: Judoka
- Height: 1.82 m (6 ft 0 in)

Sport
- Country: France
- Sport: Judo
- Weight class: ‍–‍78 kg

Achievements and titles
- Olympic Games: (silver) (2020)
- World Champ.: (2019)
- European Champ.: (gold) (2018, 2020)
Medal record
Women's judo
Representing France
Olympic Games
Gold medal – first place	2020 Tokyo	Mixed team
Gold medal – first place	2024 Paris	Mixed team
Silver medal – second place	2020 Tokyo	‍–‍78 kg
World Championships
Gold medal – first place	2019 Tokyo	‍–‍78 kg
Silver medal – second place	2021 Budapest	‍–‍78 kg
Bronze medal – third place	2024 Abu Dhabi	‍–‍78 kg
European Games
Gold medal – first place	2015 Baku	Women's team
Bronze medal – third place	2019 Minsk	‍–‍78 kg
European Championships
Gold medal – first place	2018 Tel Aviv	‍–‍78 kg
Gold medal – first place	2020 Prague	‍–‍78 kg
Bronze medal – third place	2022 Sofia	‍–‍78 kg
World Masters
Gold medal – first place	2021 Doha	‍–‍78 kg
Silver medal – second place	2017 Saint Petersburg	‍–‍78 kg
Silver medal – second place	2023 Budapest	‍–‍78 kg
IJF Grand Slam
Gold medal – first place	2014 Baku	‍–‍78 kg
Gold medal – first place	2019 Paris	‍–‍78 kg
Gold medal – first place	2020 Paris	‍–‍78 kg
Gold medal – first place	2024 Antalya	‍–‍78 kg
Silver medal – second place	2014 Paris	‍–‍78 kg
Silver medal – second place	2023 Tel Aviv	‍–‍78 kg
Bronze medal – third place	2015 Paris	‍–‍78 kg
Bronze medal – third place	2018 Paris	‍–‍78 kg
Bronze medal – third place	2019 Baku	‍–‍78 kg
Bronze medal – third place	2019 Abu Dhabi	‍–‍78 kg
Bronze medal – third place	2022 Paris	‍–‍78 kg
Bronze medal – third place	2023 Astana	‍–‍78 kg
Bronze medal – third place	2024 Paris	‍–‍78 kg
IJF Grand Prix
Gold medal – first place	2015 Samsun	‍–‍78 kg
Gold medal – first place	2016 Samsun	‍–‍78 kg
Gold medal – first place	2018 Zagreb	‍–‍78 kg
Silver medal – second place	2015 Tashkent	‍–‍78 kg
Silver medal – second place	2017 Düsseldorf	‍–‍78 kg
Silver medal – second place	2023 Linz	‍–‍78 kg
Bronze medal – third place	2017 Tbilisi	‍–‍78 kg
Bronze medal – third place	2018 Tbilisi	‍–‍78 kg
World Juniors Championships
Bronze medal – third place	2013 Ljubljana	‍–‍78 kg
European Junior Championships
Gold medal – first place	2013 Sarajevo	‍–‍78 kg
Bronze medal – third place	2011 Lommel	‍–‍78 kg
Bronze medal – third place	2012 Poreč	‍–‍78 kg
European Cadet Championships
Bronze medal – third place	2009 Koper	+70 kg
Summer Universiade
Silver medal – second place	2013 Kazan	‍–‍78 kg
Bronze medal – third place	2013 Kazan	Women's team

Profile at external databases
- IJF: 3788
- JudoInside.com: 54259
- Updated on 5 August 2024

Madeleine Malonga (born 25 December 1993) is a French judoka. She won the silver medal in the women's 78 kg event, and gold medal at mixed team event, at the 2020 Summer Olympics held in Tokyo, Japan.

== Career ==
She won a gold medal at the 2019 World Judo Championships.

In 2021, she won the gold medal in her event at the 2021 Judo World Masters held in Doha, Qatar.

She represented France at the 2020 Summer Olympics.

She won one of the bronze medals in her event at the 2022 Judo Grand Slam Paris held in Paris, France.

== Personal life ==
Born in France, Malonga is of Congolese descent.
