= Yahima Ramirez =

Portuguese judoka

Personal information
- Full name: Yahima Menéndez Ramirez
- Nationality: Portuguese
- Born: 10 October 1979 (age 46) Havana, Cuba
- Occupation: Judoka
- Height: 176 cm (5 ft 9 in)

Sport
- Country: Cuba, Portugal
- Sport: Judo
- Weight class: –78 kg

Achievements and titles
- Olympic Games: R32 (2012)
- World Champ.: 5th (2014)
- Regional finals: (gold) (1994); (bronze) (2008)
Medal record
Women's judo
Representing Cuba
Pan American Championships
Gold medal – first place	1994 Santiago	–72 kg
Representing Portugal
European Championships
Bronze medal – third place	2008 Lisbon	–78 kg
IJF Grand Slam
Bronze medal – third place	2009 Moscow	–78 kg
IJF Grand Prix
Bronze medal – third place	2017 Zagreb	–78 kg

Profile at external databases
- IJF: 181
- JudoInside.com: 46431
- Updated on 16 November 2022

Yahima Menéndez Ramirez (Note: This name uses Portuguese naming customs: the first or maternal family name is Menéndez and the second or paternal family name is Ramirez.) (born 10 October 1979, in Havana) is a Cuban-born Portuguese judoka, which competes in the women's –78 kg category. She won the gold medal at the 2009 Lusophony Games and a bronze at the 2008 European Judo Championships, both held in Lisbon. Ramirez won more than 10 medals and victories in the World Cups in Lisbon, 2009 and Taipei, 2015. She received one bronze medal at the European Open in Lisbon in 2018, and another at the European Cup in Malaga in 2019.

Ramirez competed for Portugal at the 2012 Summer Olympics in the women's 78 kg event.

== Sources ==
- "Yahima Ramirez". Comité Olímpico de Portugal (in Portuguese). Archived from the original on 7 August 2020. "Nome Completo: Yahima Menendez Ramirez"
- "Yahima Ramirez". JudoInside. Archived from the original on 26 September 2020.
- Evans, Hilary; Gjerde, Arild; Heijmans, Jeroen; Mallon, Bill; et al. "Yahima Ramirez". Olympics at Sports-Reference.com. Sports Reference LLC. Archived from the original on 3 December 2016. "Full name: Yahima Menéndez Ramirez"
- "Yahima Ramirez". London 2012 Olympics. Archived from the original on 18 July 2012.
