= 2023 European Judo Championships – Women's 78 kg =

Judo competition

Judo Women's 78 kg at the 2023 European Judo Championships
- Venue: Sud de France Arena
- Location: Montpellier, France
- Date: 5 November 2023
- Competitors: 20 from 15 nations

Medalists
gold medal	Alina Böhm (2nd title)	Germany
silver medal	Alice Bellandi	Italy
bronze medal	Patrícia Sampaio	Portugal
bronze medal	Inbar Lanir	Israel

Competition at external databases
- Links: IJF • JudoInside

The women's 78 kg event at the 2023 European Judo Championships was held at the Sud de France Arena in Montpellier, France on 5 November 2023.

== Results ==
=== Finals ===
Semi-finals
(Italy) Alice Bellandi	01
(Germany) Anna-Maria Wagner	00
(Germany) Alina Böhm	10 (yellow card)
(Netherlands) Guusje Steenhuis	00

Final
(Italy) Alice Bellandi	00 (yellow card)
(Germany) Alina Böhm	01

=== Repechage ===
Repechage
(Portugal) Patrícia Sampaio	01
(Ukraine) Yelyzaveta Lytvynenko	00
(Israel) Inbar Lanir	10
(France) Audrey Tcheuméo	00 (yellow card)

Bronze medal
(Portugal) Patrícia Sampaio	11
(Netherlands) Guusje Steenhuis	00 (yellow card)
(Israel) Inbar Lanir	10 (yellow card)
(Germany) Anna-Maria Wagner	00

=== Pool A ===
First round
(Montenegro) Jovana Peković	00 (yellow card)
(Netherlands) Lieke Derks	01

Round of 16
(Italy) Alice Bellandi	02
(Netherlands) Lieke Derks	00 (yellow card)
(Portugal) Patrícia Sampaio	10
Darya Kantsavaya	00

Quarter-finals
(Italy) Alice Bellandi	01 (yellow card)
(Portugal) Patrícia Sampaio	00

=== Pool B ===
First round
(Croatia) Karla Prodan	00
(Ukraine) Yelyzaveta Lytvynenko	01

Round of 16
(Germany) Anna-Maria Wagner	02
(United Kingdom) Emma Reid	00 (yellow card)
(France) Madeleine Malonga	00
(Ukraine) Yelyzaveta Lytvynenko	01

Quarter-finals
(Germany) Anna-Maria Wagner	10 (yellow card)
(Ukraine) Yelyzaveta Lytvynenko	00 (yellow card)

=== Pool C ===
First round
(Croatia) Petrunjela Pavić	01
(Lithuania) Miglė Julija Dudėnaitė	00

Round of 16
(Israel) Inbar Lanir	10
(Croatia) Petrunjela Pavić	00
(Germany) Alina Böhm	10
(Belgium) Vicky Verschaere	00 (yellow card)

Quarter-finals
(Israel) Inbar Lanir	00
(Germany) Alina Böhm	10 (yellow card)

=== Pool D ===
First round
(Poland) Beata Pacut-Kloczko	10
(Ukraine) Yuliia Kurchenko	00

Round of 16
(France) Audrey Tcheuméo	10
(Slovenia) Metka Lobnik	00
(Netherlands) Guusje Steenhuis	01
(Poland) Beata Pacut-Kloczko	00

Quarter-finals
(France) Audrey Tcheuméo	00
(Netherlands) Guusje Steenhuis	01
