= 2023 World Judo Championships – Women's 78 kg =

Judo competition

Judo Women's 78 kg at the 2023 World Judo Championships
- Venue: Ali Bin Hamad Al Attiya Arena
- Location: Doha, Qatar
- Date: 12 May 2023
- Competitors: 37 from 30 nations
- Total prize money: €57,000

Medalists
gold medal	Inbar Lanir (1st title)	Israel
silver medal	Audrey Tcheuméo	France
bronze medal	Guusje Steenhuis	Netherlands
bronze medal	Alice Bellandi	Italy

Competition at external databases
- Links: IJF • JudoInside

The Women's 78 kg event at the 2023 World Judo Championships was held at the Ali Bin Hamad al-Attiyah Arena in Doha, Qatar on 12 May 2023.

== Results ==
=== Finals ===
Semi-finals
(Italy) Alice Bellandi	01 (yellow card)
(Israel) Inbar Lanir	10 (yellow card)
(France) Audrey Tcheuméo	01 (yellow card)
(Netherlands) Guusje Steenhuis	00 (yellow card)

Final
(Israel) Inbar Lanir	10
(France) Audrey Tcheuméo	00

=== Repechage ===
Repechage
(South Korea) Lee Jeong-yun	00
(China) Ma Zhenzhao	10
(Japan) Shori Hamada	10
(Germany) Alina Böhm	00

Bronze medal
(China) Ma Zhenzhao	00
(Netherlands) Guusje Steenhuis	10 (yellow card)
(Japan) Shori Hamada	00
(Italy) Alice Bellandi	10

=== Pool A ===
First round
(Morocco) Hafsa Yatim	00 (yellow card)
(South Korea) Lee Jeong-yun	11 (yellow card)

Round of 32
(Italy) Alice Bellandi	02
(Peru) Camila Figueroa	00
(Cameroon) Georgika Wesly Djengue Moune	00
(Netherlands) Natascha Ausma	01 (yellow card)
(Portugal) Patrícia Sampaio	10
(United Kingdom) Emma Reid	00 (yellow card)
(South Korea) Lee Jeong-yun	10
(United States) Nicole Stout	00

Round of 16
(Italy) Alice Bellandi	10 (yellow card)
(Netherlands) Natascha Ausma	00
(Portugal) Patrícia Sampaio	00
(South Korea) Lee Jeong-yun	10 (yellow card)

Quarter-finals
(Italy) Alice Bellandi	10 (yellow card)
(South Korea) Lee Jeong-yun	00

=== Pool B ===
First round
(Uzbekistan) Iriskhon Kurbanbaeva	00 (yellow card)
(Poland) Beata Pacut-Kloczko	10

Round of 32
(Israel) Inbar Lanir	02 (yellow card)
(Poland) Beata Pacut-Kloczko	00 (yellow card)
(Chinese Taipei) Hsu Wang Shu-huei	00 (yellow card)
(Slovenia) Patricija Brolih	02
(China) Ma Zhenzhao	10 (yellow card)
(Lithuania) Miglė Dudėnaitė	00
Aleksandra Babintseva	00
(Germany) Anna Monta Olek	10

Round of 16
(Israel) Inbar Lanir	02
(Slovenia) Patricija Brolih	00
(China) Ma Zhenzhao	02 (yellow card)
(Germany) Anna Monta Olek	00

Quarter-finals
(Israel) Inbar Lanir	02
(China) Ma Zhenzhao	00 (yellow card)

=== Pool C ===
First round
Darya Kantsavaya	11 (yellow card)
(Kosovo) Loriana Kuka	00 (yellow card)
(United Kingdom) Natalie Powell	00
(Italy) Giorgia Stangherlin	10

Round of 32
(France) Audrey Tcheuméo	10 (yellow card)
(Colombia) Brenda Olaya	00
Darya Kantsavaya	01 (yellow card)
(Montenegro) Jovana Peković	00
(Japan) Shori Hamada	10
(Latvia) Una Dolgiļeviča	00
(Italy) Giorgia Stangherlin	10
(Ecuador) Vanessa Chalá	00

Round of 16
(France) Audrey Tcheuméo	10
Darya Kantsavaya	00
(Japan) Shori Hamada	10
(Italy) Giorgia Stangherlin	00

Quarter-finals
(France) Audrey Tcheuméo	02
(Japan) Shori Hamada	00

=== Pool D ===
First round
(Guinea) Marie Branser	02
(Cyprus) Zanet Michaelidou	00 (yellow card)

Round of 32
(Netherlands) Guusje Steenhuis	11
(Mongolia) Otgonbayaryn Khüslen	00
(Guinea) Marie Branser	00
(New Zealand) Moira de Villiers	01 (yellow card)
(Germany) Alina Böhm	10
(South Korea) Yoon Hyun-ji	01
(Kazakhstan) Aruna Jangeldina	00
(Slovenia) Metka Lobnik	02

Round of 16
(Netherlands) Guusje Steenhuis	10
(New Zealand) Moira de Villiers	00
(Germany) Alina Böhm	01 (yellow card)
(Slovenia) Metka Lobnik	00

Quarter-finals
(Netherlands) Guusje Steenhuis	02
(Germany) Alina Böhm	00

== Prize money ==
The sums listed bring the total prizes awarded to €57,000 for the individual event.

Medal	Total	Judoka	Coach
Gold	€26,000	€20,800	€5,200
Silver	€15,000	€12,000	€3,000
Bronze	€8,000	€6,400	€1,600
