= 2025 World Judo Championships – Women's 78 kg =

Judo competition

Judo Women's 78 kg at the 2025 World Judo Championships
- Venue: László Papp Budapest Sports Arena
- Location: Budapest, Hungary
- Date: 18 June 2025
- Competitors: 33 from 27 nations
- Total prize money: €57,000

Medalists
gold medal	Alice Bellandi (1st title)	Italy
silver medal	Anna Monta Olek	Germany
bronze medal	Kurena Ikeda	Japan
bronze medal	Patrícia Sampaio	Portugal

Competition at external databases
- Links: IJF • JudoInside

The 2025 World Judo Championships was held at the László Papp Budapest Sports Arena in Budapest, Hungary on 18 June 2025.

== Results ==
=== Finals ===
Semi-finals
(Portugal) Patrícia Sampaio	000
(Germany) Anna Monta Olek	001
(Italy) Alice Bellandi	023
(Slovenia) Metka Lobnik	000 (yellow card)

Final
(Germany) Anna Monta Olek	000
(Italy) Alice Bellandi	001

=== Repechage ===
Repechage
(Brazil) Karol Gimenes	000 (yellow card)
(Japan) Kurena Ikeda	001 (yellow card)
(China) Ma Zhenzhao	100
(Brazil) Beatriz Freitas	000

Bronze medal
(Japan) Kurena Ikeda	100
(Slovenia) Metka Lobnik	000
(China) Ma Zhenzhao	000
(Portugal) Patrícia Sampaio	100

=== Pool A ===
First round

Round of 32
(Portugal) Patrícia Sampaio	001
(Croatia) Petrunjela Pavić	000 (yellow card)
(Chinese Taipei) Hsu Wang Shu-huei	000
(South Korea) Kim Min-ju	100
(Colombia) Brenda Olaya	000
(France) Fanny Estelle Posvite	100
(Poland) Beata Pacut-Kloczko	000
(Brazil) Karol Gimenes	001 (yellow card)

Round of 16
(Portugal) Patrícia Sampaio	002
(South Korea) Kim Min-ju	000 (yellow card)
(France) Fanny Estelle Posvite	001
(Brazil) Karol Gimenes	002

Quarter-finals
(Portugal) Patrícia Sampaio	002
(Brazil) Karol Gimenes	001 (yellow card)

=== Pool B ===
First round
(China) Peng Yuxiao	000
(Japan) Kurena Ikeda	100

Round of 32
(Germany) Anna Monta Olek	010
(Netherlands) Guusje Steenhuis	000 (yellow card)
(Cuba) Lianet Cardona	001
(Uzbekistan) Marjona Kuchimova	000
(Germany) Alina Böhm	000 (yellow card)
(Japan) Kurena Ikeda	001 (yellow card)
(Guinea) Marie Branser	100 (yellow card)
(Lithuania) Miglė Julija Dudėnaitė	000 (yellow card)

Round of 16
(Germany) Anna Monta Olek	011
(Cuba) Lianet Cardona	000 (yellow card)
(Japan) Kurena Ikeda	001
(Guinea) Marie Branser	000

Quarter-finals
(Germany) Anna Monta Olek	010
(Japan) Kurena Ikeda	000 (yellow card)

=== Pool C ===
First round

Round of 32
(Italy) Alice Bellandi	100
(Kenya) Zeddy Cherotich	000
(Hungary) Nikolett Sági	101 (yellow card)
(Chinese Taipei) Wang Chieh-hsi	000
(China) Ma Zhenzhao	011 (yellow card)
(Netherlands) Lieke Derks	001 (yellow card)
(Peru) Camila Figueroa	000 (yellow card)
(Tunisia) Arij Akkab	100

Round of 16
(Italy) Alice Bellandi	100
(Hungary) Nikolett Sági	000 (yellow card)
(China) Ma Zhenzhao	100
(Tunisia) Arij Akkab	000

Quarter-finals
(Italy) Alice Bellandi	010
(China) Ma Zhenzhao	001 (yellow card)

=== Pool D ===
First round

Round of 32
~~(Israel) Inbar Lanir~~
(Cuba) Lisrialis González	w/o
(Australia) Maria Swan	000 (yellow card)
(Slovenia) Metka Lobnik	001 (yellow card)
(United Kingdom) Emma Reid	100 (yellow card)
(Cyprus) Zanet Michaelidou	000
(Brazil) Beatriz Freitas	102
(India) Ishroop Narang	000

Round of 16
(Cuba) Lisrialis González	000 (yellow card)
(Slovenia) Metka Lobnik	021
(United Kingdom) Emma Reid	001
(Brazil) Beatriz Freitas	010 (yellow card)

Quarter-finals
(Slovenia) Metka Lobnik	001
(Brazil) Beatriz Freitas	000

== Prize money ==
The sums listed bring the total prizes awarded to €57,000 for the individual event.

Medal	Total	Judoka	Coach
Gold	€26,000	€20,800	€5,200
Silver	€15,000	€12,000	€3,000
Bronze	€8,000	€6,400	€1,600
