= 2024 European Judo Championships – Women's 78 kg =

Judo competition

Judo Women's 78 kg at the 2024 European Judo Championships
- Venue: Arena Zagreb
- Location: Zagreb, Croatia
- Date: 27 April
- Competitors: 21 from 17 nations

Medalists
gold medal	Audrey Tcheuméo (5th title)	France
silver medal	Anna-Maria Wagner	Germany
bronze medal	Alina Böhm	Germany
bronze medal	Inbar Lanir	Israel

Competition at external databases
- Links: IJF • JudoInside

The women's 78 kg competition at the 2024 European Judo Championships was held on 27 April at the Arena Zagreb.

== Results ==
=== Finals ===
Semi-finals
Inbar Lanir (ISR)	00 (yellow card)
Audrey Tcheuméo (FRA)	10
Anna-Maria Wagner (GER)	10 (yellow card)
Yelyzaveta Lytvynenko (UKR)	00

Final
Audrey Tcheuméo (FRA)	10
Anna-Maria Wagner (GER)	00 (yellow card)

=== Repechage ===
Repechage
Yuliia Kurchenko (UKR)	00 (yellow card)
Alina Böhm (GER)	10
Patrícia Sampaio (POR)	01 (yellow card)
Guusje Steenhuis (NED)	00

Bronze medal
Alina Böhm (GER)	01
Yelyzaveta Lytvynenko (UKR)	00
Patrícia Sampaio (POR)	00
Inbar Lanir (ISR)	10

=== Pool A ===
First round
Miglė Julija Dudėnaitė (LTU)	00 (yellow card)
Metka Lobnik (SLO)	10

Round of 16
Inbar Lanir (ISR)	10 (yellow card)
Metka Lobnik (SLO)	00 (yellow card)
Yuliia Kurchenko (UKR)	10
Zanet Michaelidou (CYP)	00

Quarter-finals
Inbar Lanir (ISR)	10
Yuliia Kurchenko (UKR)	00

=== Pool B ===
First round
Emma Reid (GBR)	02
Petrunjela Pavić (CRO)	00
Nadezhda Tatarchenko (AIN)	10
Milica Cvijić (SRB)	00

Round of 16
Alina Böhm (GER)	10
Emma Reid (GBR)	00
Audrey Tcheuméo (FRA)	10
Nadezhda Tatarchenko (AIN)	00

Quarter-finals
Alina Böhm (GER)	00 (yellow card)
Audrey Tcheuméo (FRA)	01 (yellow card)

=== Pool C ===
First round
Vicky Verschaere (BEL)	00
Darya Kantsavaya (AIN)	10 (yellow card)

Round of 16
Anna-Maria Wagner (GER)	10
Darya Kantsavaya (AIN)	00
Patrícia Sampaio (POR)	01
Loriana Kuka (KOS)	00 (yellow card)

Quarter-finals
Anna-Maria Wagner (GER)	01 (yellow card)
Patrícia Sampaio (POR)	00 (yellow card)

=== Pool D ===
First round
Giorgia Stangherlin (ITA)	00
Karla Prodan (CRO)	10 (yellow card)

Round of 16
Guusje Steenhuis (NED)	01
Karla Prodan (CRO)	00
Yelyzaveta Lytvynenko (UKR)	10 (yellow card)
Jovana Peković (MNE)	00 (yellow card)

Quarter-finals
Guusje Steenhuis (NED)	00 (yellow card)
Yelyzaveta Lytvynenko (UKR)	01 (yellow card)
