= 2021 European Judo Championships – Women's 78 kg =

Judo Women's 78 kg at the 2021 European Judo Championships
- Venue: Altice Arena
- Location: Lisbon, Portugal
- Date: 18 April
- Competitors: 17 from 14 nations

Medalists
| gold medal | Beata Pacut (1st title) | Poland |
| silver medal | Guusje Steenhuis | Netherlands |
| bronze medal | Fanny Posvite | France |
| bronze medal | Bernadette Graf | Austria |

Competition at external databases
- Links: IJF • JudoInside

The women's 78 kg competition at the 2021 European Judo Championships was held on 18 April at the Altice Arena.

== Results ==
=== Final ===
| Final |
| Beata Pacut (POL) | 10 |
| Guusje Steenhuis (NED) | 00 |

=== Repechage ===
Repechage
Fanny Posvite (FRA) | 10
Patrícia Sampaio (POR) | 00

Third place
Fanny Posvite (FRA) | 10
Loriana Kuka (KOS) | 00

Repechage
Bernadette Graf (AUT) | 10
Marhinde Verkerk (NED) | 00

Third place
Bernadette Graf (AUT) | 10
Audrey Tcheuméo (FRA) | 00

=== Top half ===
Round of 32

Round of 16
Fanny Posvite (FRA) | 10
Antonina Shmeleva (RUS) | 00
Beata Pacut (POL) | 10
Inbar Lanir (ISR) | 00
Audrey Tcheuméo (FRA) | 10
Patricija Brolih (SLO) | 00
Patrícia Sampaio (POR) | 10
Sophie Berger (BEL) | 00

Quarterfinals
Fanny Posvite (FRA) | 00
Beata Pacut (POL) | 10
Audrey Tcheuméo (FRA) | 10
Patrícia Sampaio (POR) | 00

Semifinals
Beata Pacut (POL) | 10
Audrey Tcheuméo (FRA) | 00

=== Bottom half ===
Round of 32
Teresa Zenker (GER) | 01
Giorgia Stangherlin (ITA) | 10

Round of 16
Loriana Kuka (KOS) | 10
Anastasiya Turchyn (UKR) | 00
Bernadette Graf (AUT) | 10
Jovana Peković (MNE) | 00
Guusje Steenhuis (NED) | 01
Aleksandra Babintseva (RUS) | 00
Marhinde Verkerk (NED) | 10
Giorgia Stangherlin (ITA) | 00

Quarterfinals
Loriana Kuka (KOS) | 10
Bernadette Graf (AUT) | 00
Guusje Steenhuis (NED) | 10
Marhinde Verkerk (NED) | 00

Semifinals
Loriana Kuka (KOS) | 00
Guusje Steenhuis (NED) | 10
