= 2025 European Judo Championships – Women's 78 kg =

Judo competition

Judo Women's 78 kg at the 2025 European Judo Championships
- Venue: Morača Sports Center
- Location: Podgorica, Montenegro
- Date: 26 April 2025
- Competitors: 17 from 13 nations

Medalists
gold medal	Patrícia Sampaio (1st title)	Portugal
silver medal	Anna Monta Olek	Germany
bronze medal	Yuliia Kurchenko	Ukraine
bronze medal	Fanny Estelle Posvite	France

Competition at external databases
- Links: IJF • JudoInside

The women's 78 kg competition at the 2025 European Judo Championships was held at the Morača Sports Center in Podgorica, Montenegro on 26 April 2025.

== Results ==
=== Finals ===
Semi-finals
(Portugal) Patrícia Sampaio	100
(France) Audrey Tcheuméo	000
(Germany) Anna Monta Olek	100 (yellow card)
(United Kingdom) Emma Reid	000 (yellow card)

Final
(Portugal) Patrícia Sampaio	100
(Germany) Anna Monta Olek	000

=== Repechage ===
Repechage
(International Judo Federation) Slaviana Rylkevich	000
(Ukraine) Yuliia Kurchenko	112
(France) Fanny Estelle Posvite	110 (yellow card)
(Slovenia) Metka Lobnik	000

Bronze medal
(Ukraine) Yuliia Kurchenko	100 (yellow card)
(United Kingdom) Emma Reid	000
(France) Fanny Estelle Posvite	100
(France) Audrey Tcheuméo	000 (yellow card)

=== Pool A ===
First round

Round of 16
(Portugal) Patrícia Sampaio	100
(Finland) Emma Krapu	000
(Netherlands) Lieke Derks	002
(International Judo Federation) Slaviana Rylkevich	010

Quarter-finals
(Portugal) Patrícia Sampaio	100
(International Judo Federation) Slaviana Rylkevich	000

=== Pool B ===
First round

Round of 16
(France) Audrey Tcheuméo	010
(Germany) Julie Hölterhoff	000 (yellow card)
(Ukraine) Yuliia Kurchenko	020
(Croatia) Petrunjela Pavić	000

Quarter-finals
(France) Audrey Tcheuméo	100
(Ukraine) Yuliia Kurchenko	000

=== Pool C ===
First round

Round of 16
(Germany) Anna Monta Olek	100
(Montenegro) Jovana Peković	000
(France) Fanny Estelle Posvite	021
(International Judo Federation) Kristina Konovalova	000

Quarter-finals
(Germany) Anna Monta Olek	100
(France) Fanny Estelle Posvite	000

=== Pool D ===
First round
(International Judo Federation) Darya Kantsavaya	000
(Lithuania) Miglė Julija Dudėnaitė	100 (yellow card)

Round of 16
(United Kingdom) Emma Reid	010
(Lithuania) Miglė Julija Dudėnaitė	001
(Slovenia) Metka Lobnik	100
(Cyprus) Zanet Michaelidou	000 (yellow card)

Quarter-finals
(United Kingdom) Emma Reid	001 (yellow card)
(Slovenia) Metka Lobnik	000 (yellow card)
