= 2022 European Judo Championships – Women's 78 kg =

Judo Women's 78 kg at the 2022 European Judo Championships
- Venue: Armeets Arena
- Location: Sofia, Bulgaria
- Date: 1 May
- Competitors: 18 from 13 nations

Medalists
gold medal	Alina Böhm (1st title)	Germany
silver medal	Guusje Steenhuis	Netherlands
bronze medal	Madeleine Malonga	France
bronze medal	Alice Bellandi	Italy

Competition at external databases
- Links: IJF • JudoInside

The women's 78 kg competition at the 2022 European Judo Championships was held on 1 May at the Armeets Arena.

== Results ==
=== Finals ===
Semi-finals
Alice Bellandi (ITA)	00
Alina Böhm (GER)	10
Patrícia Sampaio (POR)	00
Guusje Steenhuis (NED)	11

Final
Alina Böhm (GER)	01
Guusje Steenhuis (NED)	00

=== Repechage ===
Repechage
Madeleine Malonga (FRA)	10
Natalie Powell (GBR)	01
Luise Malzahn (GER)	10
Anastasiya Turchyn (UKR)	01

Bronze medal
Madeleine Malonga (FRA)	10
Patrícia Sampaio (POR)	00
Luise Malzahn (GER)	00
Alice Bellandi (ITA)	10

=== Pool A ===
First round

Round of 16
Madeleine Malonga (FRA)	10
Yelyzaveta Lytvynenko (UKR)	00
Natascha Ausma (NED)	00
Alice Bellandi (ITA)	01

Quarterfinals
Madeleine Malonga (FRA)	00
Alice Bellandi (ITA)	10

=== Pool B ===
First round
Lucía Pérez Gómez (ESP)	00
Alina Böhm (GER)	10

Round of 16
Beata Pacut (POL)	00
Natalie Powell (GBR)	01
Inbar Lanir (ISR)	00
Alina Böhm (GER)	10

Quarterfinals
Natalie Powell (GBR)	00
Alina Böhm (GER)	01

=== Pool C ===
First round
Miglė Dudėnaitė (LTU)	00
Giorgia Stangherlin (ITA)	10

Round of 16
Luise Malzahn (GER)	10
Giorgia Stangherlin (ITA)	00
Emma Reid (GBR)	00
Patrícia Sampaio (POR)	01

Quarterfinals
Luise Malzahn (GER)	00
Patrícia Sampaio (POR)	01

=== Pool D ===
First round

Round of 16
Guusje Steenhuis (NED)	11
Jovana Peković (MNE)	00
Anastasiya Turchyn (UKR)	10
Petrunjela Pavić (CRO)	01

Quarterfinals
Guusje Steenhuis (NED)	10
Anastasiya Turchyn (UKR)	00
