= 2026 European Judo Championships – Women's 78 kg =

Judo competition

Judo Women's 78 kg at the 2026 European Judo Championships
- Venue: Olympic Palace
- Location: Tbilisi, Georgia
- Date: 19 April 2026
- Competitors: 19 from 17 nations

Medalists
gold medal	Alice Bellandi (1st title)	Italy
silver medal	Emma Reid	Great Britain
bronze medal	Metka Lobnik	Slovenia
bronze medal	Kaïla Issoufi	France

Competition at external databases
- Links: IJF • JudoInside

The women's 78 kg event at the 2026 European Judo Championships was held at the Olympic Palace in Tbilisi, Georgia on 19 April 2026.

== Results ==
=== Finals ===
Semi-finals
(Italy) Alice Bellandi	001
(France) Kaïla Issoufi	000 (yellow card)
(United Kingdom) Emma Reid	100
(Slovenia) Metka Lobnik	000

Final
(Italy) Alice Bellandi	010
(United Kingdom) Emma Reid	000

=== Repechage ===
Repechage
(Russia) Aleksandra Babintseva	w/o
(Israel) Inbar Lanir
(Lithuania) Miglė Julija Dudėnaitė	000
(Germany) Julie Hölterhoff	020

Bronze medal
(Russia) Aleksandra Babintseva	000
(Slovenia) Metka Lobnik	101
(Germany) Julie Hölterhoff	001
(France) Kaïla Issoufi	002 (yellow card)

=== Pool A ===
First round
(Serbia) Milica Žabić	000 (yellow card)
(United Kingdom) Shelley Ludford	110

Round of 16
(Italy) Alice Bellandi	020
(United Kingdom) Shelley Ludford	000
(Russia) Aleksandra Babintseva	100
(Romania) Maidelines Gorguet-Veranes	001

Quarter-finals
(Italy) Alice Bellandi	002
(Russia) Aleksandra Babintseva	000 (yellow card)

=== Pool B ===
First round
(Germany) Mathilda Sophie Niemeyer	101
(Belgium) Vicky Verschaere	001

Round of 16
(France) Kaïla Issoufi	101
(Belarus) Slaviana Rylkevich	000
(Israel) Inbar Lanir	110
(Germany) Mathilda Sophie Niemeyer	000

Quarter-finals
(France) Kaïla Issoufi	100
(Israel) Inbar Lanir	000

=== Pool C ===
First round
(Finland) Emma Krapu	000
(Croatia) Petrunjela Pavić	001 (yellow card)

Round of 16
(United Kingdom) Emma Reid	110
(Ukraine) Anna Kazakova	000
(Lithuania) Miglė Julija Dudėnaitė	100
(Croatia) Petrunjela Pavić	000

Quarter-finals
(United Kingdom) Emma Reid	100
(Lithuania) Miglė Julija Dudėnaitė	000 (yellow card)

=== Pool D ===
First round

Round of 16
(Slovenia) Metka Lobnik	100
(Czech Republic) Marie Košnarová	000
(Germany) Julie Hölterhoff	002 (yellow card)
(Turkey) Tuana Gülenay	001 (yellow card)

Quarter-finals
(Slovenia) Metka Lobnik	100
(Germany) Julie Hölterhoff	000
