= 2015 European Cadet Judo Championships =

Judo competition

Judo 2015 European Cadet Judo Championships
- Venue: Arena 8888 Sofia
- Location: Sofia, Bulgaria
- Dates: 3–5 July 2015
- Competitors: 469 from 41 nations

Champions
- Men's team: Georgia (1st title)
- Women's team: Russia (1st title)

Competition at external databases
- Links: IJF • JudoInside

The 2015 European Cadet Judo Championships is an edition of the European Cadet Judo Championships, organised by the International Judo Federation. It was held in Sofia, Bulgaria from 3 to 5 July 2015. The final day of competition featured the inaugural European cadet team championships events. The men's event was won by Team Georgia. Team Russia won the women's event.

== Medal summary ==
=== Medal table ===
* Host nation (Bulgaria)

| Rank | Nation | Gold | Silver | Bronze | Total |
|---|---|---|---|---|---|
| 1 | Russia (RUS) | 4 | 4 | 2 | 10 |
| 2 | Georgia (GEO) | 2 | 3 | 5 | 10 |
| 3 | Azerbaijan (AZE) | 2 | 0 | 1 | 3 |
| 4 | Germany (GER) | 1 | 1 | 1 | 3 |
| 4 | Ukraine (UKR) | 1 | 1 | 1 | 3 |
| 6 | Israel (ISR) | 1 | 1 | 0 | 2 |
| 7 | Italy (ITA) | 1 | 0 | 5 | 6 |
| 8 | Bulgaria (BUL)* | 1 | 0 | 1 | 2 |
| 9 | Finland (FIN) | 1 | 0 | 0 | 1 |
| 9 | Slovenia (SLO) | 1 | 0 | 0 | 1 |
| 9 | Turkey (TUR) | 1 | 0 | 0 | 1 |
| 12 | Austria (AUT) | 0 | 2 | 0 | 2 |
| 13 | France (FRA) | 0 | 1 | 2 | 3 |
| 13 | Serbia (SRB) | 0 | 1 | 2 | 3 |
| 15 | Romania (ROU) | 0 | 1 | 1 | 2 |
| 16 | Poland (POL) | 0 | 1 | 0 | 1 |
| 17 | Croatia (CRO) | 0 | 0 | 2 | 2 |
| 17 | Greece (GRE) | 0 | 0 | 2 | 2 |
| 17 | Hungary (HUN) | 0 | 0 | 2 | 2 |
| 17 | Netherlands (NED) | 0 | 0 | 2 | 2 |
| 21 | Belgium (BEL) | 0 | 0 | 1 | 1 |
| 21 | Cyprus (CYP) | 0 | 0 | 1 | 1 |
| 21 | Switzerland (SUI) | 0 | 0 | 1 | 1 |
| Totals (23 entries) | | 16 | 16 | 32 | 64 |

=== Men's events ===
| Event | Gold | Silver | Bronze |
|---|---|---|---|
| −50 kg | Rustam Zabolotnyi (RUS) | Giorgi Niazashvili (GEO) | Vlad Luncan (ROU) |
| −50 kg | Rustam Zabolotnyi (RUS) | Giorgi Niazashvili (GEO) | Biagio D'Angelo (ITA) |
| −55 kg | Denislav Ivanov (BUL) | Alon Aharon (ISR) | Luca Carlino (ITA) |
| −55 kg | Denislav Ivanov (BUL) | Alon Aharon (ISR) | Khamzat Akhmarov (RUS) |
| −60 kg | Manuel Lombardo (ITA) | Akhmed Bogatyrev (RUS) | Ismayil Ibrahimov (AZE) |
| −60 kg | Manuel Lombardo (ITA) | Akhmed Bogatyrev (RUS) | Robinzon Beglarashvili (GEO) |
| −66 kg | Bilal Çiloğlu (TUR) | Mathias Czizsek (AUT) | Giovanni Esposito (ITA) |
| −66 kg | Bilal Çiloğlu (TUR) | Mathias Czizsek (AUT) | Bagrati Niniashvili (GEO) |
| −73 kg | Lasha Dudashvili (GEO) | Maciej Krogulski (POL) | Aleksandr Cherkai (UKR) |
| −73 kg | Lasha Dudashvili (GEO) | Maciej Krogulski (POL) | Vasileios Balampanashvili (GRE) |
| −81 kg | Pavel Berlin (RUS) | Goga Kevkhishvili (GEO) | Ivan Stefanov (BUL) |
| −81 kg | Pavel Berlin (RUS) | Goga Kevkhishvili (GEO) | Apor Toth (HUN) |
| −90 kg | Zelym Kotsoiev (AZE) | Zauri Kenchadze (GEO) | Simeon Catharina (NED) |
| −90 kg | Zelym Kotsoiev (AZE) | Zauri Kenchadze (GEO) | Onise Saneblidze (GEO) |
| +90 kg | Inal Tasoev (RUS) | Kemal Kaitov (RUS) | Gela Zaalishvili (GEO) |
| +90 kg | Inal Tasoev (RUS) | Kemal Kaitov (RUS) | Dimitrios Tsoumitas (GRE) |
| Team | Georgia | Netherlands | France |
| Team | Georgia | Netherlands | Russia |

=== Women's events ===
| Event | Gold | Silver | Bronze |
|---|---|---|---|
| −40 kg | Shahana Hajiyeva (AZE) | Lidia Marin (ROU) | Vasiliki Kourri (CYP) |
| −40 kg | Shahana Hajiyeva (AZE) | Lidia Marin (ROU) | Lena Grulich (GER) |
| −44 kg | Daria Bilodid (UKR) | Iuliia Ogarkova (RUS) | Loïs Petit (BEL) |
| −44 kg | Daria Bilodid (UKR) | Iuliia Ogarkova (RUS) | Michela Fiorini (ITA) |
| −48 kg | Maruša Štangar (SLO) | Nadežda Petrović (SRB) | Anais Mosdier (FRA) |
| −48 kg | Maruša Štangar (SLO) | Nadežda Petrović (SRB) | Jorien Visser (NED) |
| −52 kg | Mzia Beboshvili (GEO) | Lisa Dengg (AUT) | Tihea Topolovec (CRO) |
| −52 kg | Mzia Beboshvili (GEO) | Lisa Dengg (AUT) | Margarita Shrainer (RUS) |
| −57 kg | Emilia Kanerva (FIN) | Mariia Gryzlova (RUS) | Lise Keller (SUI) |
| −57 kg | Emilia Kanerva (FIN) | Mariia Gryzlova (RUS) | Mariam Tchanturia (GEO) |
| −63 kg | Anastasia Kolyadenkova (RUS) | Hanna Kukharuk (UKR) | Jovana Obradovic (SRB) |
| −63 kg | Anastasia Kolyadenkova (RUS) | Hanna Kukharuk (UKR) | Anja Obradović (SRB) |
| −70 kg | Alina Böhm (GER) | Dorine N Tcham Po (FRA) | Alice Bellandi (ITA) |
| −70 kg | Alina Böhm (GER) | Dorine N Tcham Po (FRA) | Karla Prodan (CRO) |
| +70 kg | Raz Hershko (ISR) | Maxime Brausewetter (GER) | Fanni Toth (HUN) |
| +70 kg | Raz Hershko (ISR) | Maxime Brausewetter (GER) | Sarah Ponty (FRA) |
| Team | Russia | Croatia | France |
| Team | Russia | Croatia | Serbia |

Source Results
