= 2022 Judo Grand Slam Baku =

Judo Competition

Judo 2022 Judo Grand Slam Baku
- Venue: Heydar Aliyev Sports and Exhibition Complex
- Location: Baku, Azerbaijan
- Dates: 4–6 November 2022
- Competitors: 366 from 61 nations
- Total prize money: €154,000

Competition at external databases
- Links: IJF • EJU • JudoInside

The 2022 Judo Grand Slam Baku was held at the Heydar Aliyev Sport Arena in Baku, Azerbaijan, from 4 to 6 November 2022 as part of the IJF World Tour and during the 2024 Summer Olympics qualification period.

== Medal summary ==
=== Men's events ===
| Event | Gold | Silver | Bronze |
|---|---|---|---|
| Extra-lightweight (−60 kg) | Balabay Aghayev (AZE) | Dilshot Khalmatov (UKR) | Karamat Huseynov (AZE) |
| Extra-lightweight (−60 kg) | Balabay Aghayev (AZE) | Dilshot Khalmatov (UKR) | Byambajavyn Tsogt-Ochir (MGL) |
| Half-lightweight (−66 kg) | Denis Vieru (MDA) | Mulorajab Khalifaev (TJK) | Orkhan Safarov (AZE) |
| Half-lightweight (−66 kg) | Denis Vieru (MDA) | Mulorajab Khalifaev (TJK) | David García Torné (ESP) |
| Lightweight (−73 kg) | Hidayat Heydarov (AZE) | Arthur Margelidon (CAN) | Lasha Shavdatuashvili (GEO) |
| Lightweight (−73 kg) | Hidayat Heydarov (AZE) | Arthur Margelidon (CAN) | Abdul Malik Umayev (BEL) |
| Half-middleweight (−81 kg) | Saeid Mollaei (AZE) | Matthias Casse (BEL) | Attila Ungvári (HUN) |
| Half-middleweight (−81 kg) | Saeid Mollaei (AZE) | Matthias Casse (BEL) | Askerbii Gerbekov (BHR) |
| Middleweight (−90 kg) | Marcus Nyman (SWE) | Nemanja Majdov (SRB) | Luka Maisuradze (GEO) |
| Middleweight (−90 kg) | Marcus Nyman (SWE) | Nemanja Majdov (SRB) | Christian Parlati (ITA) |
| Half-heavyweight (−100 kg) | Zelym Kotsoiev (AZE) | Aleksandar Kukolj (SRB) | Dario Kurbjeweit Garcia (GER) |
| Half-heavyweight (−100 kg) | Zelym Kotsoiev (AZE) | Aleksandar Kukolj (SRB) | Gennaro Pirelli (ITA) |
| Heavyweight (+100 kg) | Temur Rakhimov (TJK) | Alisher Yusupov (UZB) | Richárd Sipőcz (HUN) |
| Heavyweight (+100 kg) | Temur Rakhimov (TJK) | Alisher Yusupov (UZB) | Shokhrukhkhon Bakhtiyorov (UZB) |

=== Women's events ===
| Event | Gold | Silver | Bronze |
|---|---|---|---|
| Extra-lightweight (−48 kg) | Shirine Boukli (FRA) | Francesca Milani (ITA) | Maruša Štangar (SLO) |
| Extra-lightweight (−48 kg) | Shirine Boukli (FRA) | Francesca Milani (ITA) | Milica Nikolić (SRB) |
| Half-lightweight (−52 kg) | Diyora Keldiyorova (UZB) | Lkhagvasürengiin Sosorbaram (MGL) | Sita Kadamboeva (UZB) |
| Half-lightweight (−52 kg) | Diyora Keldiyorova (UZB) | Lkhagvasürengiin Sosorbaram (MGL) | Odette Giuffrida (ITA) |
| Lightweight (−57 kg) | Christa Deguchi (CAN) | Telma Monteiro (POR) | Ivelina Ilieva (BUL) |
| Lightweight (−57 kg) | Christa Deguchi (CAN) | Telma Monteiro (POR) | Nora Gjakova (KOS) |
| Half-middleweight (−63 kg) | Inbal Shemesh (ISR) | Geke van den Berg (NED) | Utana Terada (JPN) |
| Half-middleweight (−63 kg) | Inbal Shemesh (ISR) | Geke van den Berg (NED) | Andreja Leški (SLO) |
| Middleweight (−70 kg) | Sanne van Dijke (NED) | Gabriella Willems (BEL) | Elvismar Rodríguez (VEN) |
| Middleweight (−70 kg) | Sanne van Dijke (NED) | Gabriella Willems (BEL) | Michaela Polleres (AUT) |
| Half-heavyweight (−78 kg) | Alice Bellandi (ITA) | Natascha Ausma (NED) | Loriana Kuka (KOS) |
| Half-heavyweight (−78 kg) | Alice Bellandi (ITA) | Natascha Ausma (NED) | Guusje Steenhuis (NED) |
| Heavyweight (+78 kg) | Milica Žabić (SRB) | Rochele Nunes (POR) | Kamila Berlikash (KAZ) |
| Heavyweight (+78 kg) | Milica Žabić (SRB) | Rochele Nunes (POR) | Hilal Öztürk (TUR) |

Source Results

=== Medal table ===
* Host nation (Azerbaijan)

| Rank | Nation | Gold | Silver | Bronze | Total |
|---|---|---|---|---|---|
| 1 | Azerbaijan (AZE)* | 4 | 0 | 2 | 6 |
| 2 | Netherlands (NED) | 1 | 2 | 1 | 4 |
| 2 | Serbia (SRB) | 1 | 2 | 1 | 4 |
| 4 | Italy (ITA) | 1 | 1 | 3 | 5 |
| 5 | Uzbekistan (UZB) | 1 | 1 | 2 | 4 |
| 6 | Canada (CAN) | 1 | 1 | 0 | 2 |
| 6 | Tajikistan (TJK) | 1 | 1 | 0 | 2 |
| 8 | France (FRA) | 1 | 0 | 0 | 1 |
| 8 | Israel (ISR) | 1 | 0 | 0 | 1 |
| 8 | Moldova (MDA) | 1 | 0 | 0 | 1 |
| 8 | Sweden (SWE) | 1 | 0 | 0 | 1 |
| 12 | Belgium (BEL) | 0 | 2 | 1 | 3 |
| 13 | Portugal (POR) | 0 | 2 | 0 | 2 |
| 14 | Mongolia (MGL) | 0 | 1 | 1 | 2 |
| 15 | Ukraine (UKR) | 0 | 1 | 0 | 1 |
| 16 | Georgia (GEO) | 0 | 0 | 2 | 2 |
| 16 | Hungary (HUN) | 0 | 0 | 2 | 2 |
| 16 | Kosovo (KOS) | 0 | 0 | 2 | 2 |
| 16 | Slovenia (SLO) | 0 | 0 | 2 | 2 |
| 20 | Austria (AUT) | 0 | 0 | 1 | 1 |
| 20 | Bahrain (BHR) | 0 | 0 | 1 | 1 |
| 20 | Bulgaria (BUL) | 0 | 0 | 1 | 1 |
| 20 | Germany (GER) | 0 | 0 | 1 | 1 |
| 20 | Japan (JPN) | 0 | 0 | 1 | 1 |
| 20 | Kazakhstan (KAZ) | 0 | 0 | 1 | 1 |
| 20 | Spain (ESP) | 0 | 0 | 1 | 1 |
| 20 | Turkey (TUR) | 0 | 0 | 1 | 1 |
| 20 | Venezuela (VEN) | 0 | 0 | 1 | 1 |
| Totals (28 entries) | | 14 | 14 | 28 | 56 |

== Prize money ==
The sums written are per medalist, bringing the total prizes awarded to €154,000. (retrieved from:)

| Medal | Total | Judoka | Coach |
|---|---|---|---|
| Gold | €5,000 | €4,000 | €1,000 |
| Silver | €3,000 | €2,400 | €600 |
| Bronze | €1,500 | €1,200 | €300 |
