= Jaba Papinashvili =

Georgian judoka (born 1998)

Personal information
- Nationality: Georgian
- Born: 27 April 1998 (age 28)
- Occupation: Judoka

Sport
- Country: Georgia
- Sport: Judo
- Weight class: –60 kg

Achievements and titles
- European Champ.: R16 (2022)
Medal record
Men's judo
Representing Georgia
IJF Grand Slam
Gold medal – first place	2021 Baku	–60 kg
Bronze medal – third place	2022 Paris	–60 kg
IJF Grand Prix
Silver medal – second place	2018 Antalya	–60 kg
Bronze medal – third place	2019 Tbilisi	–60 kg
European U23 Championships
Bronze medal – third place	2019 Izhevsk	–60 kg
Bronze medal – third place	2020 Poreč	–60 kg
European U23 Championships
Silver medal – second place	2018 Győr	–60 kg
World Juniors Championships
Gold medal – first place	2017 Zagreb	–55 kg
Bronze medal – third place	2018 Nassau	–60 kg
European Junior Championships
Bronze medal – third place	2018 Sofia	–60 kg

Profile at external databases
- IJF: 20533
- JudoInside.com: 96708
- Updated on 20 November 2022

Jaba Papinashvili (born 18 April 1998) is a Georgian judoka.

He is the gold medallist of the 2021 Judo Grand Slam Baku in the -60 kg category. He won one of the bronze medals in his event at the 2022 Judo Grand Slam Paris held in Paris, France.
