= Judo at the 2024 Summer Olympics – Women's 78 kg =

Judo Women's 78 kg at the Games of the XXXIII Olympiad
- Venue: Grand Palais Éphémère
- Location: Paris, France
- Date: 1 August 2024
- Competitors: 22 from 22 nations
- Website: Official website

Medalists
| gold medal | Alice Bellandi (1st title) | Italy |
| silver medal | Inbar Lanir | Israel |
| bronze medal | Ma Zhenzhao | China |
| bronze medal | Patrícia Sampaio | Portugal |

Competition at external databases
- Links: IJF • JudoInside

The Women's 78 kg event in Judo at the 2024 Summer Olympics was held at the Grand Palais Éphémère in Paris, France on 1 August 2024.

== Summary ==
This is the ninth appearance of the women's half heavyweight category.

Shori Hamada was not chosen by the IOC, Madeleine Malonga lost to Patrícia Sampaio, one of the bronze medalists, Anna-Maria Wagner lost to potentially silver medalist Inbar Lanir, later, Wagner lost to Ma Zhenzhao in the bronze medal match, Mayra Aguiar lost to eventual champion Alice Bellandi.

== Results ==
=== Finals ===
Semi-finals
Alice Bellandi (ITA) | 01 (yellow card)
Patrícia Sampaio (POR) | 00 (yellow card)
Anna-Maria Wagner (GER) | 00
Inbar Lanir (ISR) | 10 (yellow card)

Final
Alice Bellandi (ITA) | 11 (yellow card)
Inbar Lanir (ISR) | 00

=== Repechage ===
Repechage
Yelyzaveta Lytvynenko (UKR) | 00
Ma Zhenzhao (CHN) | 10
Rika Takayama (JPN) | 10
Guusje Steenhuis (NED) | 00

Bronze medal
Ma Zhenzhao (CHN) | 01
Anna-Maria Wagner (GER) | 00 (yellow card)
Rika Takayama (JPN) | 00 (yellow card)
Patrícia Sampaio (POR) | 10 (yellow card)

=== Pool A ===
First round
Metka Lobnik (SLO) | 00 (yellow card)
Loriana Kuka (KOS) | 10 (yellow card)

Round of 16
Alice Bellandi (ITA) | 01
Mayra Aguiar (BRA) | 00
Yelyzaveta Lytvynenko (UKR) | 01
Loriana Kuka (KOS) | 00

Quarter-finals
Alice Bellandi (ITA) | 10 (yellow card)
Yelyzaveta Lytvynenko (UKR) | 00

=== Pool B ===
First round
Yoon Hyun-ji (KOR) | 10 (yellow card)
Emma Reid (GBR) | 00
Zeddy Cherotich (KEN) | 00
Patrícia Sampaio (POR) | 10

Round of 16
Ma Zhenzhao (CHN) | 10 (yellow card)
Yoon Hyun-ji (KOR) | 01
Madeleine Malonga (FRA) | 00
Patrícia Sampaio (POR) | 11

Quarter-finals
Ma Zhenzhao (CHN) | 00
Patrícia Sampaio (POR) | 10

=== Pool C ===
First round
Marie Branser (GUI) | 10
Moira de Villiers (NZL) | 00

Round of 16
Anna-Maria Wagner (GER) | 11
Marie Branser (GUI) | 00
Rika Takayama (JPN) | 10
Iriskhon Kurbanbaeva (UZB) | 00

Quarter-finals
Anna-Maria Wagner (GER) | 10 (yellow card)
Rika Takayama (JPN) | 00

=== Pool D ===
First round
Vanessa Chalá (ECU) | 00
Otgonbayaryn Khüslen (MGL) | 01
Beata Pacut-Kloczko (POL) | 10
Ange Ciella Niragira (BDI) | 00

Round of 16
Inbar Lanir (ISR) | 10
Otgonbayaryn Khüslen (MGL) | 00
Guusje Steenhuis (NED) | 01 (yellow card)
Beata Pacut-Kloczko (POL) | 00

Quarter-finals
Inbar Lanir (ISR) | 10
Guusje Steenhuis (NED) | 00
