= 2017 World Judo Juniors Championships =

Judo competition

Judo 2017 World Judo Juniors Championships
- Venue: Dom Sportova
- Location: Zagreb, Croatia
- Dates: 18–21 October 2017
- Competitors: 590 from 83 nations

Champions
- Mixed team: Japan (1st title)

Competition at external databases
- Links: IJF • JudoInside

The 2017 World Judo Juniors Championships was an edition of the World Judo Juniors Championships, organised by the International Judo Federation. It was held in Zagreb, Croatia from 18–21 October 2017. The final day of competition featured a mixed team event, won by team Japan.

== Medal summary ==
=== Medal table ===
* Host nation (Croatia)

Rank	Nation	Gold	Silver	Bronze	Total
1	Japan (JPN)	8	2	5	15
2	Azerbaijan (AZE)	2	2	1	5
3	Russia (RUS)	1	2	2	5
4	Germany (GER)	1	1	2	4
5	Netherlands (NED)	1	1	0	2
6	Belgium (BEL)	1	0	3	4
7	Georgia (GEO)	1	0	2	3
8	Brazil (BRA)	1	0	1	2
9	Kazakhstan (KAZ)	0	1	2	3
9	Mongolia (MGL)	0	1	2	3
11	Austria (AUT)	0	1	1	2
12	Bosnia and Herzegovina (BIH)	0	1	0	1
12	Dominican Republic (DOM)	0	1	0	1
12	Spain (ESP)	0	1	0	1
12	Turkey (TUR)	0	1	0	1
12	Uzbekistan (UZB)	0	1	0	1
17	Cuba (CUB)	0	0	2	2
17	Slovenia (SLO)	0	0	2	2
17	Tajikistan (TJK)	0	0	2	2
20	France (FRA)	0	0	1	1
20	Great Britain (GBR)	0	0	1	1
20	Italy (ITA)	0	0	1	1
20	Portugal (POR)	0	0	1	1
20	Romania (ROU)	0	0	1	1
Totals (24 entries)		16	16	32	64

=== Men's events ===
Event	Gold	Silver	Bronze
–55 kg	Jaba Papinashvili (GEO)	Natig Gurbanli (AZE)	Bauyrzhan Narbayev (KAZ)
–55 kg	Jaba Papinashvili (GEO)	Natig Gurbanli (AZE)	Lkhagvajamtsyn Önöbold (MGL)
–60 kg	Taigo Sugimoto (JPN)	Karamat Huseynov (AZE)	Amarbold Jagvaraldorj (MGL)
–60 kg	Taigo Sugimoto (JPN)	Karamat Huseynov (AZE)	Genki Koga (JPN)
–66 kg	Daniel Cargnin (BRA)	Artyom Shturbabin (UZB)	Somon Makhmadbekov (TJK)
–66 kg	Daniel Cargnin (BRA)	Artyom Shturbabin (UZB)	Bagrati Niniashvili (GEO)
–73 kg	Hidayat Heydarov (AZE)	Bilal Çiloğlu (TUR)	Didar Khamza (KAZ)
–73 kg	Hidayat Heydarov (AZE)	Bilal Çiloğlu (TUR)	Tato Grigalashvili (GEO)
–81 kg	Matthias Casse (BEL)	Turpal Tepkaev (RUS)	Christian Parlati (ITA)
–81 kg	Matthias Casse (BEL)	Turpal Tepkaev (RUS)	Tim Gramkow (GER)
–90 kg	Goki Tajima (JPN)	Robert Florentino (DOM)	Eduard Trippel (GER)
–90 kg	Goki Tajima (JPN)	Robert Florentino (DOM)	Koshi Nagai (JPN)
–100 kg	Zelym Kotsoiev (AZE)	Arman Adamian (RUS)	Takaya Yamaguchi (JPN)
–100 kg	Zelym Kotsoiev (AZE)	Arman Adamian (RUS)	Temur Rakhimov (TJK)
+100 kg	Inal Tasoev (RUS)	Stephan Hegyi (AUT)	Daigo Kagawa (JPN)
+100 kg	Inal Tasoev (RUS)	Stephan Hegyi (AUT)	Enej Marinič (SLO)

=== Women's events ===
Event	Gold	Silver	Bronze
–44 kg	Nina Kuboi (JPN)	Abiba Abuzhakynova (KAZ)	Loïs Petit (BEL)
–44 kg	Nina Kuboi (JPN)	Abiba Abuzhakynova (KAZ)	Kristina Bulgakova (RUS)
–48 kg	Amber Gersjes (NED)	Laura Martinez Abelenda (ESP)	Maruša Štangar (SLO)
–48 kg	Amber Gersjes (NED)	Laura Martinez Abelenda (ESP)	Melissa Hurtado Munoz (CUB)
–52 kg	Uta Abe (JPN)	Chishima Maeda (JPN)	Nazakat Azizova (AZE)
–52 kg	Uta Abe (JPN)	Chishima Maeda (JPN)	Cleonia Riciu (ROU)
–57 kg	Haruka Funakubo (JPN)	Lkhagvatogoogiin Enkhriilen (MGL)	Mina Libeer (BEL)
–57 kg	Haruka Funakubo (JPN)	Lkhagvatogoogiin Enkhriilen (MGL)	Kim Ji-su (KOR)
–63 kg	Honoka Araki (JPN)	Sanne Vermeer (NED)	Clémence Eme (FRA)
–63 kg	Honoka Araki (JPN)	Sanne Vermeer (NED)	Lubjana Piovesana (GBR)
–70 kg	Giovanna Scoccimarro (GER)	Aleksandra Samardzic (BIH)	Michaela Polleres (AUT)
–70 kg	Giovanna Scoccimarro (GER)	Aleksandra Samardzic (BIH)	Gabriella Willems (BEL)
–78 kg	Shiyu Umezu (JPN)	Teresa Zenker (GER)	Marina Bukreeva (RUS)
–78 kg	Shiyu Umezu (JPN)	Teresa Zenker (GER)	Patrícia Sampaio (POR)
+78 kg	Akira Sone (JPN)	Hikaru Kodama (JPN)	Elianis Aguilar (CUB)
+78 kg	Akira Sone (JPN)	Hikaru Kodama (JPN)	Beatriz Souza (BRA)

Source Results

=== Mixed ===
Event	Gold	Silver	Bronze
Mixed team	Japan	Netherlands	Germany
Mixed team	Japan	Netherlands	Russia

Source Results
