= 2019 Judo Grand Prix Tbilisi =

Judo competition

Judo 2019 Judo Grand Prix Tbilisi
- Venue: New Sports Palace
- Location: Tbilisi, Georgia
- Dates: 29–31 March 2019
- Competitors: 370 from 52 nations

Competition at external databases
- Links: IJF • EJU • JudoInside

The 2019 Judo Grand Prix Tbilisi were held in Tbilisi, Georgia, from 29 to 31 March 2019.

== Medal summary ==
=== Men's events ===
| Event | Gold | Silver | Bronze |
|---|---|---|---|
| Extra-lightweight (−60 kg) | Lukhumi Chkhvimiani (GEO) | Walide Khyar (FRA) | Sharafuddin Lutfillaev (UZB) |
| Extra-lightweight (−60 kg) | Lukhumi Chkhvimiani (GEO) | Walide Khyar (FRA) | Jaba Papinashvili (GEO) |
| Half-lightweight (−66 kg) | Tal Flicker (ISR) | Giorgi Tutashvili (GEO) | Bagrati Niniashvili (GEO) |
| Half-lightweight (−66 kg) | Tal Flicker (ISR) | Giorgi Tutashvili (GEO) | Daniel Perez Roman (ESP) |
| Lightweight (−73 kg) | Guillaume Chaine (FRA) | Magdiel Estrada (CUB) | Denis Iartsev (RUS) |
| Lightweight (−73 kg) | Guillaume Chaine (FRA) | Magdiel Estrada (CUB) | Valeri Iashvili (GEO) |
| Half-middleweight (−81 kg) | Frank de Wit (NED) | Timo Cavelius (GER) | Antoine Valois-Fortier (CAN) |
| Half-middleweight (−81 kg) | Frank de Wit (NED) | Timo Cavelius (GER) | Tato Grigalashvili (GEO) |
| Middleweight (−90 kg) | Iván Felipe Silva Morales (CUB) | Giorgi Papunashvili (GEO) | Gantulgyn Altanbagana (MGL) |
| Middleweight (−90 kg) | Iván Felipe Silva Morales (CUB) | Giorgi Papunashvili (GEO) | Beka Gviniashvili (GEO) |
| Half-heavyweight (−100 kg) | Kazbek Zankishiev (RUS) | Rafael Buzacarini (BRA) | Michael Korrel (NED) |
| Half-heavyweight (−100 kg) | Kazbek Zankishiev (RUS) | Rafael Buzacarini (BRA) | Mukhammadkarim Khurramov (UZB) |
| Heavyweight (+100 kg) | Levani Matiashvili (GEO) | Aliaksandr Vakhaviak (BLR) | Roy Meyer (NED) |
| Heavyweight (+100 kg) | Levani Matiashvili (GEO) | Aliaksandr Vakhaviak (BLR) | Onise Bughadze (GEO) |

=== Women's events ===
| Event | Gold | Silver | Bronze |
|---|---|---|---|
| Extra-lightweight (−48 kg) | Mélanie Clément (FRA) | Daria Bilodid (UKR) | Mönkhbatyn Urantsetseg (MGL) |
| Extra-lightweight (−48 kg) | Mélanie Clément (FRA) | Daria Bilodid (UKR) | Nathalia Brigida (BRA) |
| Half-lightweight (−52 kg) | Odette Giuffrida (ITA) | Gili Cohen (ISR) | Astride Gneto (FRA) |
| Half-lightweight (−52 kg) | Odette Giuffrida (ITA) | Gili Cohen (ISR) | Larissa Pimenta (BRA) |
| Lightweight (−57 kg) | Nora Gjakova (KOS) | Rafaela Silva (BRA) | Hélène Receveaux (FRA) |
| Lightweight (−57 kg) | Nora Gjakova (KOS) | Rafaela Silva (BRA) | Sanne Verhagen (NED) |
| Half-middleweight (−63 kg) | Sanne Vermeer (NED) | Geke van den Berg (NED) | Martyna Trajdos (GER) |
| Half-middleweight (−63 kg) | Sanne Vermeer (NED) | Geke van den Berg (NED) | Maylín del Toro Carvajal (CUB) |
| Middleweight (−70 kg) | Bárbara Timo (POR) | Laura Vargas Koch (GER) | María Pérez (PUR) |
| Middleweight (−70 kg) | Bárbara Timo (POR) | Laura Vargas Koch (GER) | Alice Bellandi (ITA) |
| Half-heavyweight (−78 kg) | Loriana Kuka (KOS) | Kaliema Antomarchi (CUB) | Patrícia Sampaio (POR) |
| Half-heavyweight (−78 kg) | Loriana Kuka (KOS) | Kaliema Antomarchi (CUB) | Fanny Estelle Posvite (FRA) |
| Heavyweight (+78 kg) | Julia Tolofua (FRA) | Beatriz Souza (BRA) | Maryna Slutskaya (BLR) |
| Heavyweight (+78 kg) | Julia Tolofua (FRA) | Beatriz Souza (BRA) | Rochele Nunes (POR) |

Source Results

=== Medal table ===
* Host nation (Georgia)

| Rank | Nation | Gold | Silver | Bronze | Total |
|---|---|---|---|---|---|
| 1 | France (FRA) | 3 | 1 | 3 | 7 |
| 2 | Georgia (GEO)* | 2 | 2 | 6 | 10 |
| 3 | Netherlands (NED) | 2 | 1 | 3 | 6 |
| 4 | Kosovo (KOS) | 2 | 0 | 0 | 2 |
| 5 | Cuba (CUB) | 1 | 2 | 1 | 4 |
| 6 | Israel (ISR) | 1 | 1 | 0 | 2 |
| 7 | Portugal (POR) | 1 | 0 | 2 | 3 |
| 8 | Italy (ITA) | 1 | 0 | 1 | 2 |
| 8 | Russia (RUS) | 1 | 0 | 1 | 2 |
| 10 | Brazil (BRA) | 0 | 3 | 2 | 5 |
| 11 | Germany (GER) | 0 | 2 | 1 | 3 |
| 12 | Belarus (BLR) | 0 | 1 | 1 | 2 |
| 13 | Ukraine (UKR) | 0 | 1 | 0 | 1 |
| 14 | Mongolia (MGL) | 0 | 0 | 2 | 2 |
| 14 | Uzbekistan (UZB) | 0 | 0 | 2 | 2 |
| 16 | Canada (CAN) | 0 | 0 | 1 | 1 |
| 16 | Puerto Rico (PUR) | 0 | 0 | 1 | 1 |
| 16 | Spain (ESP) | 0 | 0 | 1 | 1 |
| Totals (18 entries) | | 14 | 14 | 28 | 56 |
