= 2018 European Junior Judo Championships =

Judo competition

Judo 2018 European Junior Judo Championships
- Venue: Asics Arena
- Location: Sofia, Bulgaria
- Dates: 13–16 September 2018
- Competitors: 404 from 42 nations

Champions
- Mixed team: Russia (1st title)

Competition at external databases
- Links: IJF • EJU • JudoInside

The 2018 European Junior Judo Championships is an edition of the European Junior Judo Championships, organised by the European Judo Union.It was held in Sofia, Bulgaria from 13 to 16 September 2018. The final day of competition featured a mixed team event, won by team Russia.

== Medal summary ==
=== Medal table ===
* Host nation (Bulgaria)

| Rank | Nation | Gold | Silver | Bronze | Total |
|---|---|---|---|---|---|
| 1 | Georgia (GEO) | 3 | 2 | 4 | 9 |
| 2 | Italy (ITA) | 2 | 0 | 3 | 5 |
| 3 | France (FRA) | 2 | 0 | 2 | 4 |
| 4 | Ukraine (UKR) | 2 | 0 | 0 | 2 |
| 5 | Germany (GER) | 1 | 4 | 2 | 7 |
| 6 | Russia (RUS) | 1 | 2 | 2 | 5 |
| 7 | Azerbaijan (AZE) | 1 | 1 | 4 | 6 |
| 8 | Portugal (POR) | 1 | 1 | 0 | 2 |
| 9 | Hungary (HUN) | 1 | 0 | 2 | 3 |
| 10 | Slovenia (SLO) | 1 | 0 | 1 | 2 |
| 11 | Belgium (BEL) | 1 | 0 | 0 | 1 |
| 12 | Turkey (TUR) | 0 | 2 | 4 | 6 |
| 13 | Croatia (CRO) | 0 | 1 | 1 | 2 |
| 13 | Poland (POL) | 0 | 1 | 1 | 2 |
| 15 | Kosovo (KOS) | 0 | 1 | 0 | 1 |
| 15 | Netherlands (NED) | 0 | 1 | 0 | 1 |
| 17 | Spain (ESP) | 0 | 0 | 3 | 3 |
| 18 | Serbia (SRB) | 0 | 0 | 2 | 2 |
| 19 | Austria (AUT) | 0 | 0 | 1 | 1 |
| Totals (19 entries) | | 16 | 16 | 32 | 64 |

=== Men's events ===
| Event | Gold | Silver | Bronze |
|---|---|---|---|
| −55 kg | Dilshot Khalmatov (UKR) | Rovshan Aliyev (AZE) | Balabay Aghayev (AZE) |
| −55 kg | Dilshot Khalmatov (UKR) | Rovshan Aliyev (AZE) | Oguzhan Ozisik (TUR) |
| −60 kg | Tofig Mammadov (AZE) | Konstantin Simeonidis (RUS) | Mihraç Akkuş (TUR) |
| −60 kg | Tofig Mammadov (AZE) | Konstantin Simeonidis (RUS) | Jaba Papinashvili (GEO) |
| −66 kg | Manuel Lombardo (ITA) | Murad Chopanov (RUS) | Wachid Borchashvili (AUT) |
| −66 kg | Manuel Lombardo (ITA) | Murad Chopanov (RUS) | Bagrati Niniashvili (GEO) |
| −73 kg | Hievorh Manukian (UKR) | João Fernando (POR) | Giovanni Esposito (ITA) |
| −73 kg | Hievorh Manukian (UKR) | João Fernando (POR) | Cezary Tchorzewski (POL) |
| −81 kg | Luka Maisuradze (GEO) | Tato Grigalashvili (GEO) | Christian Parlati (ITA) |
| −81 kg | Luka Maisuradze (GEO) | Tato Grigalashvili (GEO) | Murad Fatiyev (AZE) |
| −90 kg | Falk Petersilka (GER) | Mert Şişmanlar (TUR) | Apor Toth (HUN) |
| −90 kg | Falk Petersilka (GER) | Mert Şişmanlar (TUR) | Mansur Lorsanov (RUS) |
| −100 kg | Onise Saneblidze (GEO) | Shpati Zekaj (KOS) | Daniel Zorn (GER) |
| −100 kg | Onise Saneblidze (GEO) | Shpati Zekaj (KOS) | Adil Karimli (AZE) |
| +100 kg | Gela Zaalishvili (GEO) | Erik Abramov (GER) | Enej Marinič (SLO) |
| +100 kg | Gela Zaalishvili (GEO) | Erik Abramov (GER) | David Babayan (RUS) |

=== Women's events ===
| Event | Gold | Silver | Bronze |
|---|---|---|---|
| −44 kg | Loïs Petit (BEL) | Ana Viktorija Puljiz (CRO) | Shafag Hamidova (AZE) |
| −44 kg | Loïs Petit (BEL) | Ana Viktorija Puljiz (CRO) | Gamze Sayma (TUR) |
| −48 kg | Ekaterina Dolgikh (RUS) | Tuğçe Beder (TUR) | Laura Martinez Abelenda (ESP) |
| −48 kg | Ekaterina Dolgikh (RUS) | Tuğçe Beder (TUR) | Mireia Lapuerta Comas (ESP) |
| −52 kg | Faïza Mokdar (FRA) | Annika Würfel (GER) | Nina Estefania Esteo Linne (ESP) |
| −52 kg | Faïza Mokdar (FRA) | Annika Würfel (GER) | Coraline Marcus Tabellion (FRA) |
| −57 kg | Sarah-Léonie Cysique (FRA) | Eteri Liparteliani (GEO) | Maryline Louis Sidney (FRA) |
| −57 kg | Sarah-Léonie Cysique (FRA) | Eteri Liparteliani (GEO) | Marica Perišić (SRB) |
| −63 kg | Lia Ludvik (SLO) | Angelika Szymańska (POL) | Nadia Simeoli (ITA) |
| −63 kg | Lia Ludvik (SLO) | Angelika Szymańska (POL) | Anja Obradović (SRB) |
| −70 kg | Alice Bellandi (ITA) | Margit de Voogd (NED) | Mariam Tchanturia (GEO) |
| −70 kg | Alice Bellandi (ITA) | Margit de Voogd (NED) | Marlene Galandi (GER) |
| −78 kg | Patrícia Sampaio (POR) | Christina Faber (GER) | Karla Prodan (CRO) |
| −78 kg | Patrícia Sampaio (POR) | Christina Faber (GER) | Fanni Toth (HUN) |
| +78 kg | Mercedesz Szigetvári (HUN) | Renee Lucht (GER) | Sophio Somkhishvili (GEO) |
| +78 kg | Mercedesz Szigetvári (HUN) | Renee Lucht (GER) | Kubranur Esir (TUR) |

Source Results

=== Mixed ===
| Event | Gold | Silver | Bronze |
|---|---|---|---|
| Mixed team | Russia | France | Germany |
| Mixed team | Russia | France | Netherlands |

Source Results
