= 2023 Judo Grand Slam Antalya =

Judo competition

Judo 2023 Judo Grand Slam Antalya
- Venue: Antalya Sports Hall
- Location: Antalya, Turkey
- Dates: 31 March – 2 April 2023
- Competitors: 600 from 83 nations
- Total prize money: €154,000

Competition at external databases
- Links: IJF • EJU • JudoInside

The 2023 Judo Grand Slam Antalya was held at the Antalya Sports Hall in Antalya, Turkey from 31 March to 2 April 2023 as part of the IJF World Tour and during the 2024 Summer Olympics qualification period.

== Medal summary ==
=== Men's events ===
Event	Gold	Silver	Bronze
Extra-lightweight (−60 kg)	Luka Mkheidze (FRA)	Dilshot Khalmatov (UKR)	Jorre Verstraeten (BEL)
Extra-lightweight (−60 kg)	Luka Mkheidze (FRA)	Dilshot Khalmatov (UKR)	Nurkanat Serikbayev (KAZ)
Half-lightweight (−66 kg)	Maxime Gobert (FRA)	Battogtokhyn Erkhembayar (MGL)	David García Torné (ESP)
Half-lightweight (−66 kg)	Maxime Gobert (FRA)	Battogtokhyn Erkhembayar (MGL)	Willian Lima (BRA)
Lightweight (−73 kg)	Manuel Lombardo (ITA)	Tsend-Ochiryn Tsogtbaatar (MGL)	Vladyslav Kazimirov (UKR)
Lightweight (−73 kg)	Manuel Lombardo (ITA)	Tsend-Ochiryn Tsogtbaatar (MGL)	Hidayat Heydarov (AZE)
Half-middleweight (−81 kg)	Matthias Casse (BEL)	Saeid Mollaei (AZE)	François Gauthier-Drapeau (CAN)
Half-middleweight (−81 kg)	Matthias Casse (BEL)	Saeid Mollaei (AZE)	Alpha Oumar Djalo (FRA)
Middleweight (−90 kg)	Noël van 't End (NED)	Alex Creţ (ROU)	Artem Bubyr (UKR)
Middleweight (−90 kg)	Noël van 't End (NED)	Alex Creţ (ROU)	Ivaylo Ivanov (BUL)
Half-heavyweight (−100 kg)	Aaron Fara (AUT)	Daniel Eich (SUI)	Bojan Došen (SRB)
Half-heavyweight (−100 kg)	Aaron Fara (AUT)	Daniel Eich (SUI)	Kyle Reyes (CAN)
Heavyweight (+100 kg)	Jelle Snippe (NED)	Roy Meyer (NED)	Song Woo-hyeok (KOR)
Heavyweight (+100 kg)	Jelle Snippe (NED)	Roy Meyer (NED)	İbrahim Tataroğlu (TUR)

=== Women's events ===
Event	Gold	Silver	Bronze
Extra-lightweight (−48 kg)	Blandine Pont (FRA)	Shira Rishony (ISR)	Bavuudorjiin Baasankhüü (MGL)
Extra-lightweight (−48 kg)	Blandine Pont (FRA)	Shira Rishony (ISR)	Ganbaataryn Narantsetseg (MGL)
Half-lightweight (−52 kg)	Amandine Buchard (FRA)	Chelsie Giles (GBR)	Réka Pupp (HUN)
Half-lightweight (−52 kg)	Amandine Buchard (FRA)	Chelsie Giles (GBR)	Sita Kadamboeva (UZB)
Lightweight (−57 kg)	Rafaela Silva (BRA)	Christa Deguchi (CAN)	Kaja Kajzer (SLO)
Lightweight (−57 kg)	Rafaela Silva (BRA)	Christa Deguchi (CAN)	Jéssica Lima (BRA)
Half-middleweight (−63 kg)	Ketleyn Quadros (BRA)	Inbal Shemesh (ISR)	Katharina Haecker (AUS)
Half-middleweight (−63 kg)	Ketleyn Quadros (BRA)	Inbal Shemesh (ISR)	Catherine Beauchemin-Pinard (CAN)
Middleweight (−70 kg)	Saki Niizoe (JPN)	Barbara Matić (CRO)	Maya Goshen (ISR)
Middleweight (−70 kg)	Saki Niizoe (JPN)	Barbara Matić (CRO)	Ai Tsunoda (ESP)
Half-heavyweight (−78 kg)	Audrey Tcheuméo (FRA)	Shori Hamada (JPN)	Alina Böhm (GER)
Half-heavyweight (−78 kg)	Audrey Tcheuméo (FRA)	Shori Hamada (JPN)	Patrícia Sampaio (POR)
Heavyweight (+78 kg)	Kayra Sayit (TUR)	Milica Žabić (SRB)	Romane Dicko (FRA)
Heavyweight (+78 kg)	Kayra Sayit (TUR)	Milica Žabić (SRB)	Hilal Öztürk (TUR)

Source results:

=== Medal table ===
* Host nation (Turkey)

Rank	Nation	Gold	Silver	Bronze	Total
1	France (FRA)	5	0	2	7
2	Netherlands (NED)	2	1	0	3
3	Brazil (BRA)	2	0	2	4
4	Japan (JPN)	1	1	0	2
5	Turkey (TUR)*	1	0	2	3
6	Belgium (BEL)	1	0	1	2
7	Austria (AUT)	1	0	0	1
7	Italy (ITA)	1	0	0	1
9	Mongolia (MGL)	0	2	2	4
10	Israel (ISR)	0	2	1	3
11	Canada (CAN)	0	1	3	4
12	Ukraine (UKR)	0	1	2	3
13	Azerbaijan (AZE)	0	1	1	2
13	Serbia (SRB)	0	1	1	2
15	Croatia (CRO)	0	1	0	1
15	Great Britain (GBR)	0	1	0	1
15	Romania (ROU)	0	1	0	1
15	Switzerland (SUI)	0	1	0	1
19	Spain (ESP)	0	0	2	2
20	Australia (AUS)	0	0	1	1
20	Bulgaria (BUL)	0	0	1	1
20	Germany (GER)	0	0	1	1
20	Hungary (HUN)	0	0	1	1
20	Kazakhstan (KAZ)	0	0	1	1
20	Portugal (POR)	0	0	1	1
20	Slovenia (SLO)	0	0	1	1
20	South Korea (KOR)	0	0	1	1
20	Uzbekistan (UZB)	0	0	1	1
Totals (28 entries)		14	14	28	56

== Prize money ==
The sums written are per medalist, bringing the total prizes awarded to €154,000. (retrieved from:)

Medal	Total	Judoka	Coach
Gold	€5,000	€4,000	€1,000
Silver	€3,000	€2,400	€600
Bronze	€1,500	€1,200	€300
