= 2019 European U23 Judo Championships =

Judo 2019 European U23 Judo Championships
- Venue: Izhstal Sport Palace
- Location: Izhevsk, Russia
- Dates: 1–3 November 2019
- Competitors: 235 from 33 nations

Competition at external databases
- Links: IJF • JudoInside

The 2019 European U23 Judo Championships were the edition of the European U23 Judo Championships, organised by the European Judo Union. It was held in Izhevsk, Russia from 1–3 November 2019.

== Medal overview ==
=== Men ===
Event	Gold	Silver	Bronze
Extra-lightweight (−60 kg)	Ramazan Abdulaev (RUS)	Ayub Bliev (RUS)	Temur Nozadze (GEO)
Extra-lightweight (−60 kg)	Ramazan Abdulaev (RUS)	Ayub Bliev (RUS)	Jaba Papinashvili (GEO)
Half-lightweight (−66 kg)	Murad Chopanov (RUS)	Nurlan Osmanov (AZE)	David García Torné (ESP)
Half-lightweight (−66 kg)	Murad Chopanov (RUS)	Nurlan Osmanov (AZE)	Mattia Miceli (ITA)
Lightweight (−73 kg)	Rashid Mammadaliyev (AZE)	Ayub Khazhaliev (RUS)	Schamil Dzavbatyrov (GER)
Lightweight (−73 kg)	Rashid Mammadaliyev (AZE)	Ayub Khazhaliev (RUS)	Wachid Borchashvili (AUT)
Half-middleweight (−81 kg)	Turpal Tepkaev (RUS)	Paweł Drzymał (POL)	Benedek Tóth (HUN)
Half-middleweight (−81 kg)	Turpal Tepkaev (RUS)	Paweł Drzymał (POL)	Muhammet Koç (TUR)
Middleweight (−90 kg)	Roland Gőz (HUN)	Falk Petersilka (GER)	Iurii Bozha (RUS)
Middleweight (−90 kg)	Roland Gőz (HUN)	Falk Petersilka (GER)	Roman Dontsov (RUS)
Half-heavyweight (−100 kg)	Daniel Mukete (BLR)	Onise Saneblidze (GEO)	Jelle Snippe (NED)
Half-heavyweight (−100 kg)	Daniel Mukete (BLR)	Onise Saneblidze (GEO)	Kacper Szczurowski (POL)
Heavyweight (+100 kg)	Richárd Sipőcz (HUN)	Jur Spijkers (NED)	Martti Puumalainen (FIN)
Heavyweight (+100 kg)	Richárd Sipőcz (HUN)	Jur Spijkers (NED)	Yahor Kukharenka (BLR)

=== Women ===
Event	Gold	Silver	Bronze
Extra-lightweight (−48 kg)	Daria Pichkaleva (RUS)	Mireia Lapuerta Comas (ESP)	Tuğçe Beder (TUR)
Extra-lightweight (−48 kg)	Daria Pichkaleva (RUS)	Mireia Lapuerta Comas (ESP)	Andrea Stojadinov (SRB)
Half-lightweight (−52 kg)	Amber Ryheul (BEL)	Nina Estefania Esteo Linne (ESP)	Yasmin Javadian (GBR)
Half-lightweight (−52 kg)	Amber Ryheul (BEL)	Nina Estefania Esteo Linne (ESP)	Annika Würfel (GER)
Lightweight (−57 kg)	Eteri Liparteliani (GEO)	Danna Nagucheva (RUS)	Wilsa Gomes (POR)
Lightweight (−57 kg)	Eteri Liparteliani (GEO)	Danna Nagucheva (RUS)	Tihea Topolovec (CRO)
Half-middleweight (−63 kg)	Szofi Özbas (HUN)	Anja Obradović (SRB)	Minel Akdeniz (TUR)
Half-middleweight (−63 kg)	Szofi Özbas (HUN)	Anja Obradović (SRB)	Anastasia Kolyadenkova (RUS)
Middleweight (−70 kg)	Mariam Tchanturia (GEO)	Hilde Jager (NED)	Margit de Voogd (NED)
Middleweight (−70 kg)	Mariam Tchanturia (GEO)	Hilde Jager (NED)	Alina Böhm (GER)
Half-heavyweight (−78 kg)	Jovana Peković (MNE)	Teresa Zenker (GER)	Sophie Berger (BEL)
Half-heavyweight (−78 kg)	Jovana Peković (MNE)	Teresa Zenker (GER)	Inbar Lanir (ISR)
Heavyweight (+78 kg)	Samira Bouizgarne (GER)	Renee Lucht (GER)	Zrinka Miocic (CRO)
Heavyweight (+78 kg)	Samira Bouizgarne (GER)	Renee Lucht (GER)	Mercedesz Szigetvári (HUN)

=== Medal table ===
* Host nation (Russia)

Rank	Nation	Gold	Silver	Bronze	Total
1	Russia (RUS)*	4	3	3	10
2	Hungary (HUN)	3	0	2	5
3	Georgia (GEO)	2	1	2	5
4	Germany (GER)	1	3	3	7
5	Azerbaijan (AZE)	1	1	0	2
6	Belarus (BLR)	1	0	1	2
6	Belgium (BEL)	1	0	1	2
8	Montenegro (MNE)	1	0	0	1
9	Netherlands (NED)	0	2	2	4
10	Spain (ESP)	0	2	1	3
11	Poland (POL)	0	1	1	2
11	Serbia (SRB)	0	1	1	2
13	Turkey (TUR)	0	0	3	3
14	Croatia (CRO)	0	0	2	2
15	Austria (AUT)	0	0	1	1
15	Finland (FIN)	0	0	1	1
15	Great Britain (GBR)	0	0	1	1
15	Israel (ISR)	0	0	1	1
15	Italy (ITA)	0	0	1	1
15	Portugal (POR)	0	0	1	1
Totals (20 entries)		14	14	28	56

== Participating nations ==
There was a total of 235 participants from 33 nations.

- Armenia (3)
- Austria (3)
- Azerbaijan (9)
- Belarus (11)
- Belgium (4)
- Bosnia and Herzegovina (3)
- Bulgaria (8)
- Croatia (12)
- Cyprus (3)
- Czech Republic (4)
- Denmark (1)
- Finland (6)
- Georgia (12)
- Germany (16)
- Great Britain (3)
- Greece (1)
- Hungary (13)
- Israel (12)
- Italy (16)
- Latvia (1)
- Moldova (5)
- Montenegro (2)
- Netherlands (9)
- Poland (10)
- Portugal (6)
- Romania (7)
- Russia (18)
- Serbia (4)
- Slovakia (3)
- Slovenia (3)
- Spain (12)
- Switzerland (5)
- Turkey (10)
