= Natascha Ausma =

Dutch judoka (born 1996)

Personal information
- Nationality: Dutch
- Born: 17 July 1996 (age 29) Lippenhuizen, Netherlands
- Occupation: Judoka

Sport
- Country: Netherlands
- Sport: Judo
- Weight class: ‍–‍78 kg

Achievements and titles
- World Champ.: R16 (2023)
- European Champ.: R16 (2017, 2020, 2022)
Medal record
Women's judo
Representing the Netherlands
IJF Grand Slam
Gold medal – first place	2021 Tbilisi	‍–‍78 kg
Silver medal – second place	2021 Kazan	‍–‍78 kg
Silver medal – second place	2022 Baku	‍–‍78 kg
Bronze medal – third place	2020 Budapest	‍–‍78 kg
Bronze medal – third place	2022 Antalya	‍–‍78 kg
Bronze medal – third place	2022 Tokyo	‍–‍78 kg
IJF Grand Prix
Bronze medal – third place	2017 Tbilisi	‍–‍70 kg
Bronze medal – third place	2017 Hohhot	‍–‍70 kg
Bronze medal – third place	2022 Zagreb	‍–‍78 kg
World Juniors Championships
Bronze medal – third place	2015 Abu Dhabi	‍–‍70 kg
European Junior Championships
Bronze medal – third place	2016 Málaga	‍–‍70 kg

Profile at external databases
- IJF: 18016
- JudoInside.com: 63546
- Updated on 12 May 2023

Natascha Ausma (born 17 July 1996) is a Dutch judoka.

Ausma is the gold medalist of the 2021 Judo Grand Slam Tbilisi in the ‍–‍78 kg category.
