= 2022 Judo Grand Slam Tel Aviv =

Judo competition

Judo 2022 Judo Grand Slam Tel Aviv
- Venue: Drive in Arena
- Location: Tel Aviv, Israel
- Dates: 17–19 February 2022
- Competitors: 298 from 34 nations
- Total prize money: 154,000€

Competition at external databases
- Links: IJF • EJU • JudoInside

The 2022 Judo Grand Slam Tel Aviv was held in Tel Aviv, Israel, from 17 to 19 February 2022.

== Event videos ==
The event aired freely on the IJF YouTube channel.

	Weight classes	Preliminaries			Final Block
Day 1	Men: -60, -66 Women: -48, -52, -57	Commentated			Commentated
Day 1	Men: -60, -66 Women: -48, -52, -57	Tatami 1	Tatami 2	Tatami 3	Commentated
Day 2	Men: -73, -81 Women: -63, -70	Commentated			Commentated
Day 2	Men: -73, -81 Women: -63, -70	Tatami 1	Tatami 2	Tatami 3	Commentated
Day 3	Men: -90, -100, +100 Women: -78, +78	Commentated			Commentated
Day 3	Men: -90, -100, +100 Women: -78, +78	Tatami 1	Tatami 2	Tatami 3	Commentated

== Medal summary ==
=== Medal table ===
* Host nation (Israel)

Rank	Nation	Gold	Silver	Bronze	Total
1	France (FRA)	4	0	4	8
2	Azerbaijan (AZE)	2	1	1	4
3	Georgia (GEO)	2	1	0	3
3	Japan (JPN)	2	1	0	3
5	Israel (ISR)*	1	0	4	5
6	Belgium (BEL)	1	0	1	2
6	Ukraine (UKR)	1	0	1	2
8	Poland (POL)	1	0	0	1
9	Brazil (BRA)	0	2	0	2
9	Netherlands (NED)	0	2	0	2
11	Italy (ITA)	0	1	2	3
11	Kazakhstan (KAZ)	0	1	2	3
13	Great Britain (GBR)	0	1	1	2
13	Turkey (TUR)	0	1	1	2
15	Germany (GER)	0	1	0	1
15	Serbia (SRB)	0	1	0	1
15	Uzbekistan (UZB)	0	1	0	1
18	Mongolia (MGL)	0	0	3	3
19	Hungary (HUN)	0	0	2	2
20	Austria (AUT)	0	0	1	1
20	Canada (CAN)	0	0	1	1
20	Cuba (CUB)	0	0	1	1
20	Portugal (POR)	0	0	1	1
20	Spain (ESP)	0	0	1	1
20	Tajikistan (TJK)	0	0	1	1
Totals (25 entries)		14	14	28	56

=== Men's events ===
Event	Gold	Silver	Bronze
Extra-lightweight (−60 kg)	Artem Lesiuk (UKR)	Bauyrzhan Narbayev (KAZ)	Byambajavyn Tsogt-Ochir (MGL)
Extra-lightweight (−60 kg)	Artem Lesiuk (UKR)	Bauyrzhan Narbayev (KAZ)	Magzhan Shamshadin (KAZ)
Half-lightweight (−66 kg)	Baruch Shmailov (ISR)	Yashar Najafov (AZE)	Bogdan Iadov (UKR)
Half-lightweight (−66 kg)	Baruch Shmailov (ISR)	Yashar Najafov (AZE)	Ganboldyn Kherlen (MGL)
Lightweight (−73 kg)	Hidayat Heydarov (AZE)	Obidkhon Nomonov (UZB)	Zhansay Smagulov (KAZ)
Lightweight (−73 kg)	Hidayat Heydarov (AZE)	Obidkhon Nomonov (UZB)	Tohar Butbul (ISR)
Half-middleweight (−81 kg)	Matthias Casse (BEL)	Vedat Albayrak (TUR)	Sami Chouchi (BEL)
Half-middleweight (−81 kg)	Matthias Casse (BEL)	Vedat Albayrak (TUR)	François Gauthier-Drapeau (CAN)
Middleweight (−90 kg)	Mammadali Mehdiyev (AZE)	Nemanja Majdov (SRB)	Iván Felipe Silva Morales (CUB)
Middleweight (−90 kg)	Mammadali Mehdiyev (AZE)	Nemanja Majdov (SRB)	Mihael Žgank (TUR)
Half-heavyweight (−100 kg)	Ilia Sulamanidze (GEO)	Michael Korrel (NED)	Zelym Kotsoiev (AZE)
Half-heavyweight (−100 kg)	Ilia Sulamanidze (GEO)	Michael Korrel (NED)	Peter Paltchik (ISR)
Heavyweight (+100 kg)	Guram Tushishvili (GEO)	Rafael Silva (BRA)	Temur Rakhimov (TJK)
Heavyweight (+100 kg)	Guram Tushishvili (GEO)	Rafael Silva (BRA)	Stephan Hegyi (AUT)

=== Women's events ===
Event	Gold	Silver	Bronze
Extra-lightweight (−48 kg)	Shirine Boukli (FRA)	Francesca Milani (ITA)	Julia Figueroa (ESP)
Extra-lightweight (−48 kg)	Shirine Boukli (FRA)	Francesca Milani (ITA)	Bavuudorjiin Baasankhüü (MGL)
Half-lightweight (−52 kg)	Astride Gneto (FRA)	Ryūko Takeda (JPN)	Odette Giuffrida (ITA)
Half-lightweight (−52 kg)	Astride Gneto (FRA)	Ryūko Takeda (JPN)	Réka Pupp (HUN)
Lightweight (−57 kg)	Priscilla Gneto (FRA)	Eteri Liparteliani (GEO)	Faïza Mokdar (FRA)
Lightweight (−57 kg)	Priscilla Gneto (FRA)	Eteri Liparteliani (GEO)	Timna Nelson-Levy (ISR)
Half-middleweight (−63 kg)	Megumi Horikawa (JPN)	Gemma Howell (GBR)	Szofi Özbas (HUN)
Half-middleweight (−63 kg)	Megumi Horikawa (JPN)	Gemma Howell (GBR)	Manon Deketer (FRA)
Middleweight (−70 kg)	Shiho Tanaka (JPN)	Sanne van Dijke (NED)	Marie-Ève Gahié (FRA)
Middleweight (−70 kg)	Shiho Tanaka (JPN)	Sanne van Dijke (NED)	Kelly Petersen Pollard (GBR)
Half-heavyweight (−78 kg)	Beata Pacut (POL)	Alina Böhm (GER)	Patrícia Sampaio (POR)
Half-heavyweight (−78 kg)	Beata Pacut (POL)	Alina Böhm (GER)	Alice Bellandi (ITA)
Heavyweight (+78 kg)	Romane Dicko (FRA)	Beatriz Souza (BRA)	Raz Hershko (ISR)
Heavyweight (+78 kg)	Romane Dicko (FRA)	Beatriz Souza (BRA)	Julia Tolofua (FRA)

== Prize money ==
The sums written are per medalist, bringing the total prizes awarded to 154,000€. (retrieved from:)

Medal	Total	Judoka	Coach
Gold	5,000€	4,000€	1,000€
Silver	3,000€	2,400€	600€
Bronze	1,500€	1,200€	300€
