= Anja Obradović =

Serbian judoka (born 2000)

Personal information
- Nationality: Serbian
- Born: 24 January 2000 (age 26) Belgrade, Serbia, FR Yugoslavia
- Occupation: Judoka

Sport
- Country: Serbia
- Sport: Judo
- Weight class: ‍–‍63 kg
- Club: OJK "Proleter" Zrenjanin

Achievements and titles
- Olympic Games: R32 (2020)
- World Champ.: (bronze) (2021)
- European Champ.: R16 (2019, 2021, 2023)
Medal record
Women's judo
Representing Serbia
World Championships
Bronze medal – third place	2021 Budapest	‍–‍63 kg
European U23 Championships
Silver medal – second place	2019 Izhevsk	‍–‍63 kg
World Juniors Championships
Silver medal – second place	2019 Marrakesh	‍–‍63 kg
Bronze medal – third place	2018 Nassau	‍–‍63 kg
European Junior Championships
Bronze medal – third place	2016 Málaga	‍–‍63 kg
Bronze medal – third place	2018 Sofia	‍–‍63 kg
Bronze medal – third place	2020 Poreč	‍–‍63 kg
World Cadets Championships
Bronze medal – third place	2015 Sarajevo	‍–‍63 kg
European Cadet Championships
Gold medal – first place	2016 Vantaa	‍–‍63 kg
Gold medal – first place	2017 Kaunas	‍–‍63 kg
Bronze medal – third place	2015 Sofia	‍–‍63 kg
European Youth Olympic Festival
Silver medal – second place	2017 Győr	‍–‍63 kg
Bronze medal – third place	2017 Győr	Women's team
World Military Championships
Silver medal – second place	2018 Rio de Janeiro	‍–‍63 kg

Profile at external databases
- IJF: 19483
- JudoInside.com: 95240
- Updated on 23 May 2023

Anja Obradović (Serbian Cyrillic: Ања Обрадовић; born 24 January 2000) is a Serbian judoka. She won a bronze medal at the 2021 World Championships in Budapest. She also competed at the 2020 Summer Olympics in the women's 63 kg event and was eliminated in the first round.

During her junior career, Obradović won a silver medal at the World Juniors Championships in Marrakesh 2019 and a bronze in Nassau 2018.

Obradović's older sister Jovana Bunčić is also a judoka.

== Achievements ==
Year	Tournament	Place	Weight class
2021	World Championships	3rd	−63 kg
2020	European Junior Championships	3rd	−63 kg
2019	European U-23 Championships	2nd	−63 kg
2019	World Junior Championships	2nd	−63 kg
2018	World Military Championships	2nd	−63 kg
2018	World Junior Championships	3rd	−63 kg
2018	European Junior Championships	3rd	−63 kg
2017	European Cadet Championships	1st	−63 kg
2017	European Youth Olympic Festival	2nd	−63 kg
2016	European Junior Championships	3rd	−63 kg
2016	European Cadet Championships	1st	−63 kg
2015	World Cadet Championships	3rd	−63 kg
2015	European Cadet Championships	3rd	−63 kg
