= 2021 Judo Grand Slam Baku =

Judo competition

Judo 2021 Judo Grand Slam Baku
- Venue: Heydar Aliyev Sports and Exhibition Complex
- Location: Baku, Azerbaijan
- Dates: 5–7 November 2021
- Competitors: 195 from 29 nations
- Total prize money: 154,000€

Competition at external databases
- Links: IJF • EJU • JudoInside

The 2021 Judo Grand Slam Baku was held at the Heydar Aliyev Sports and Concert Complex in Baku, Azerbaijan from 5 to 7 November 2021.

== Event videos ==
The event will air freely on the IJF YouTube channel.

	Weight classes	Preliminaries			Final Block
Day 1	Men: -60, -66 Women: -48, -52, -57	Commentated			Commentated
Day 1	Men: -60, -66 Women: -48, -52, -57	Tatami 1	Tatami 2	Tatami 3	Commentated
Day 2	Men: -73, -81 Women: -63, -70	Commentated			Commentated
Day 2	Men: -73, -81 Women: -63, -70	Tatami 1	Tatami 2	Tatami 3	Commentated
Day 3	Men: -90, -100, +100 Women: -78, +78	Commentated			Commentated
Day 3	Men: -90, -100, +100 Women: -78, +78	Tatami 1	Tatami 2	Tatami 3	Commentated

== Medal summary ==
=== Men's events ===
Event	Gold	Silver	Bronze
Extra-lightweight (−60 kg)	Jaba Papinashvili (GEO)	Albert Oguzov (RUS)	Rovshan Aliyev (AZE)
Extra-lightweight (−60 kg)	Jaba Papinashvili (GEO)	Albert Oguzov (RUS)	Hayato Kondo (JPN)
Half-lightweight (−66 kg)	Orkhan Safarov (AZE)	Denis Vieru (MDA)	Yevhen Honcharko (UKR)
Half-lightweight (−66 kg)	Orkhan Safarov (AZE)	Denis Vieru (MDA)	Ryoma Tanaka (JPN)
Lightweight (−73 kg)	Makhmadbek Makhmadbekov (RUS)	Ken Oyoshi (JPN)	Tsend-Ochiryn Tsogtbaatar (MGL)
Lightweight (−73 kg)	Makhmadbek Makhmadbekov (RUS)	Ken Oyoshi (JPN)	Hidayat Heydarov (AZE)
Half-middleweight (−81 kg)	Vedat Albayrak (TUR)	Dominik Družeta (CRO)	François Gauthier-Drapeau (CAN)
Half-middleweight (−81 kg)	Vedat Albayrak (TUR)	Dominik Družeta (CRO)	Eljan Hajiyev (AZE)
Middleweight (−90 kg)	Kosuke Mashiyama (JPN)	Mammadali Mehdiyev (AZE)	Beka Gviniashvili (GEO)
Middleweight (−90 kg)	Kosuke Mashiyama (JPN)	Mammadali Mehdiyev (AZE)	Luka Maisuradze (GEO)
Half-heavyweight (−100 kg)	Niyaz Bilalov (RUS)	Shady El Nahas (CAN)	Onise Saneblidze (GEO)
Half-heavyweight (−100 kg)	Niyaz Bilalov (RUS)	Shady El Nahas (CAN)	Kentaro Iida (JPN)
Heavyweight (+100 kg)	Tatsuru Saito (JPN)	Temur Rakhimov (TJK)	Odkhüügiin Tsetsentsengel (MGL)
Heavyweight (+100 kg)	Tatsuru Saito (JPN)	Temur Rakhimov (TJK)	Ushangi Kokauri (AZE)

=== Women's events ===
Event	Gold	Silver	Bronze
Extra-lightweight (−48 kg)	Rina Tatsukawa (JPN)	Katharina Tanzer (AUT)	Shira Rishony (ISR)
Extra-lightweight (−48 kg)	Rina Tatsukawa (JPN)	Katharina Tanzer (AUT)	Daria Pichkaleva (RUS)
Half-lightweight (−52 kg)	Réka Pupp (HUN)	Chelsie Giles (GBR)	Bishreltiin Khorloodoi (MGL)
Half-lightweight (−52 kg)	Réka Pupp (HUN)	Chelsie Giles (GBR)	Anastasia Polikarpova (RUS)
Lightweight (−57 kg)	Momo Tamaoki (JPN)	Mönkhtsedeviin Ichinkhorloo (AZE)	Mina Libeer (BEL)
Lightweight (−57 kg)	Momo Tamaoki (JPN)	Mönkhtsedeviin Ichinkhorloo (AZE)	Pauline Starke (GER)
Half-middleweight (−63 kg)	Lucy Renshall (GBR)	Boldyn Gankhaich (MGL)	Anriquelis Barrios (VEN)
Half-middleweight (−63 kg)	Lucy Renshall (GBR)	Boldyn Gankhaich (MGL)	Megumi Horikawa (JPN)
Middleweight (−70 kg)	Utana Terada (JPN)	Lara Cvjetko (CRO)	Miriam Butkereit (GER)
Middleweight (−70 kg)	Utana Terada (JPN)	Lara Cvjetko (CRO)	Kelly Petersen Pollard (GBR)
Half-heavyweight (−78 kg)	Luise Malzahn (GER)	Inbar Lanir (ISR)	Karla Prodan (CRO)
Half-heavyweight (−78 kg)	Luise Malzahn (GER)	Inbar Lanir (ISR)	Karen León (VEN)
Heavyweight (+78 kg)	Renée Lucht (GER)	Amarsaikhany Adiyaasüren (MGL)	Ivana Maranić (CRO)
Heavyweight (+78 kg)	Renée Lucht (GER)	Amarsaikhany Adiyaasüren (MGL)	Raz Hershko (ISR)

Source Results

=== Medal table ===
* Host nation (Azerbaijan)

Rank	Nation	Gold	Silver	Bronze	Total
1	Japan (JPN)	5	1	4	10
2	Russia (RUS)	2	1	2	5
3	Germany (GER)	2	0	2	4
4	Azerbaijan (AZE)*	1	2	4	7
5	Great Britain (GBR)	1	1	1	3
6	Georgia (GEO)	1	0	3	4
7	Hungary (HUN)	1	0	0	1
7	Turkey (TUR)	1	0	0	1
9	Mongolia (MGL)	0	2	3	5
10	Croatia (CRO)	0	2	2	4
11	Israel (ISR)	0	1	2	3
12	Canada (CAN)	0	1	1	2
13	Austria (AUT)	0	1	0	1
13	Moldova (MDA)	0	1	0	1
13	Tajikistan (TJK)	0	1	0	1
16	Venezuela (VEN)	0	0	2	2
17	Belgium (BEL)	0	0	1	1
17	Ukraine (UKR)	0	0	1	1
Totals (18 entries)		14	14	28	56

== Prize money ==
The sums written are per medalist, bringing the total prizes awarded to €154,000. (retrieved from:)

Medal	Total	Judoka	Coach
Gold	€5,000	€4,000	€1,000
Silver	€3,000	€2,400	€600
Bronze	€1,500	€1,200	€300
