= 2023 European Judo Championships – Women's 63 kg =

Judo competition

Judo Women's 63 kg at the 2023 European Judo Championships
- Venue: Sud de France Arena
- Location: Montpellier, France
- Date: 4 November
- Competitors: 28 from 21 nations

Medalists
gold medal	Andreja Leški (1st title)	Slovenia
silver medal	Gili Sharir	Israel
bronze medal	Angelika Szymańska	Poland
bronze medal	Laura Fazliu	Kosovo

Competition at external databases
- Links: IJF • JudoInside

The women's 63 kg competition at the 2023 European Judo Championships was held on 4 November at the Sud de France Arena.

== Results ==
=== Finals ===
Semi-finals
Laura Fazliu (KOS)	00 (yellow card)
Andreja Leški (SLO)	10 (yellow card)
Gili Sharir (ISR)	10 (yellow card)
Angelika Szymańska (POL)	00

Final
Andreja Leški (SLO)	01 (yellow card)
Gili Sharir (ISR)	00 (yellow card)

=== Repechage ===
Repechage
Clarisse Agbegnenou (FRA)	00
Szofi Özbas (HUN)	01
Joanne van Lieshout (NED)	00
Bárbara Timo (POR)	01

Bronze medal
Szofi Özbas (HUN)	00
Angelika Szymańska (POL)	10 (yellow card)
Bárbara Timo (POR)	00 (yellow card)
Laura Fazliu (KOS)	10

=== Pool A ===
First round
Yuliia Hrebenozhko (UKR)	01
Savita Russo (ITA)	00 (yellow card)
Clarisse Agbegnenou (FRA)	10
Katarina Krišto (CRO)	00
Lubjana Piovesana (AUT)	00
Emilia Kanerva (FIN)	01

Round of 16
Laura Fazliu (KOS)	10
Yuliia Hrebenozhko (UKR)	00
Clarisse Agbegnenou (FRA)	10
Emilia Kanerva (FIN)	00

Quarter-finals
Laura Fazliu (KOS)	01 (yellow card)
Clarisse Agbegnenou (FRA)	00 (yellow card)

=== Pool B ===
First round
Renata Zachová (CZE)	00
Anja Obradović (SRB)	10 (yellow card)
Andreja Leški (SLO)	10
Cristina Cabaña (ESP)	00 (yellow card)
Amanda Zuaznabar-Torres (ROU)	00
Kamila Badurova (AIN)	10 (yellow card)

Round of 16
Szofi Özbas (HUN)	10
Anja Obradović (SRB)	00 (yellow card)
Andreja Leški (SLO)	10
Kamila Badurova (AIN)	00

Quarter-finals
Szofi Özbas (HUN)	00
Andreja Leški (SLO)	02 (yellow card)

=== Pool C ===
First round
Sarai Padilla (ESP)	10
Helene Christensen (DEN)	00
Joanne van Lieshout (NED)	01 (yellow card)
Jovana Bunčić (SRB)	00
Minel Akdeniz (TUR)	00 (yellow card)
Iva Oberan (CRO)	10

Round of 16
Gili Sharir (ISR)	01 (yellow card)
Sarai Padilla (ESP)	00
Joanne van Lieshout (NED)	02
Iva Oberan (CRO)	00

Quarter-finals
Gili Sharir (ISR)	10
Joanne van Lieshout (NED)	00

=== Pool D ===
First round
Magdalena Krssakova (AUT)	00
Florentina Ivănescu (ROU)	10
Bárbara Timo (POR)	10
Věra Zemanová (CZE)	00
Eter Askilashvili (GEO)	00
Flavia Favorini (ITA)	10

Round of 16
Angelika Szymańska (POL)	10
Florentina Ivănescu (ROU)	00
Bárbara Timo (POR)	01
Flavia Favorini (ITA)	00 (yellow card)

Quarter-finals
Angelika Szymańska (POL)	10
Bárbara Timo (POR)	00
