= Onise Saneblidze =

Georgian judoka (born 1998)

Personal information
- Nationality: Georgian
- Born: 22 October 1998 (age 27)
- Occupation: Judoka

Sport
- Country: Georgia
- Sport: Judo
- Weight class: –100 kg
Medal record
Men's judo
Representing Georgia
IJF Grand Slam
Gold medal – first place	2022 Tbilisi	–100 kg
Bronze medal – third place	2021 Paris	–100 kg
Bronze medal – third place	2021 Baku	–100 kg
IJF Grand Prix
Bronze medal – third place	2018 Tbilisi	–100 kg
European U23 Championships
Silver medal – second place	2019 Izhevsk	–100 kg
Bronze medal – third place	2018 Győr	–100 kg
Bronze medal – third place	2020 Poreč	–100 kg
World Juniors Championships
Bronze medal – third place	2018 Nassau	–100 kg
European Junior Championships
Gold medal – first place	2018 Sofia	–100 kg
World Cadets Championships
Bronze medal – third place	2015 Sarajevo	–90 kg
European Cadet Championships
Bronze medal – third place	2015 Sofia	–90 kg

Profile at external databases
- IJF: 20477
- JudoInside.com: 48595
- Updated on 5 June 2022

Onise Saneblidze (born 22 October 1998) is a Georgian judoka. He is the bronze medallist in the -100 kg at the 2021 Judo Grand Slam Paris
