= 2013 European Judo Championships – Women's team =

Judo competition

Judo Women's team at the 2013 European Judo Championships
- Venue: László Papp Budapest Sports Arena
- Location: Budapest, Hungary
- Date: 28 April
- Nations: 9

Medalists
gold medal	Netherlands (2nd title)
silver medal	France
bronze medal	Germany
bronze medal	Russia

Competition at external databases
- Links: EJU • JudoInside

The women's team competition at the 2013 European Judo Championships was held on 28 April at the László Papp Budapest Sports Arena in Budapest, Hungary.

== Results ==
Round of 16
Ukraine	2
Slovenia	3

Quarter-finals
Russia	3
Austria	2
Netherlands	5
Hungary	0
France	5
Croatia	0
Germany	3
Slovenia	2

Semi-finals
Russia	1
Netherlands	4
France	3
Germany	2

Final
Netherlands	4
France	1

=== Repechage ===
Repechage
Austria	3
Hungary	2

Third place
Austria	0
Germany	5

Repechage
Croatia	1
Slovenia	4

Third place
Slovenia	2
Russia	3
