= Inbar Lanir =

Israeli judoka (born 2000)

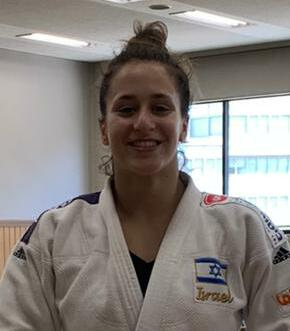
- Lanir in 2021

Personal information
- Native name: ענבר לניר
- Born: 3 April 2000 (age 26) Yokneam Illit, Israel
- Occupation: Judoka
- Website: inbarlanir.com

Sport
- Country: Israel
- Sport: Judo
- Weight class: ‍–‍78 kg
- Rank: 5th dan black belt

Achievements and titles
- Olympic Games: (silver) (2024)
- World Champ.: (gold) (2023)
- European Champ.: (bronze) (2023, 2024)
- Highest world ranking: 1^{st}
Medal record
Women's judo
Representing Israel
Olympic Games
Silver medal – second place	2024 Paris	‍–‍78 kg
Bronze medal – third place	2020 Tokyo	Mixed team
World Championships
Gold medal – first place	2023 Doha	‍–‍78 kg
Bronze medal – third place	2022 Tashkent	Mixed team
European Championships
Bronze medal – third place	2023 Montpellier	‍–‍78 kg
Bronze medal – third place	2024 Zagreb	‍–‍78 kg
World Masters
Gold medal – first place	2023 Budapest	‍–‍78 kg
IJF Grand Slam
Gold medal – first place	2023 Ulaanbaatar	‍–‍78 kg
Silver medal – second place	2021 Baku	‍–‍78 kg
Silver medal – second place	2022 Ulaanbaatar	‍–‍78 kg
Silver medal – second place	2022 Budapest	‍–‍78 kg
Silver medal – second place	2023 Tokyo	‍–‍78 kg
Silver medal – second place	2025 Paris	‍–‍78 kg
Bronze medal – third place	2021 Tashkent	‍–‍78 kg
Bronze medal – third place	2021 Tbilisi	‍–‍78 kg
Bronze medal – third place	2021 Paris	‍–‍78 kg
Bronze medal – third place	2021 Abu Dhabi	‍–‍78 kg
Bronze medal – third place	2023 Tbilisi	‍–‍78 kg
Bronze medal – third place	2025 Tashkent	‍–‍78 kg
IJF Grand Prix
Silver medal – second place	2022 Zagreb	‍–‍78 kg
Bronze medal – third place	2022 Almada	‍–‍78 kg
European U23 Championships
Gold medal – first place	2020 Poreč	‍–‍78 kg
Bronze medal – third place	2019 Izhevsk	‍–‍78 kg
European Junior Championships
Bronze medal – third place	2020 Poreč	‍–‍78 kg

Profile at external databases
- IJF: 20209
- JudoInside.com: 95372
- Updated on 4 May 2025

Inbar Lanir (Hebrew: ענבר לניר; born 3 April 2000) is an Israeli Olympic silver medalist judoka and 2023 world champion. She competes in the under 78 kg weight category. She also won a bronze medal in the mixed team event at the 2020 Olympic Games. In addition to winning the 2023 world championship, she won gold medals at the 2023 World Masters and the 2023 Ulaanbaatar Grand Slam. Lanir competed for Israel at the 2024 Summer Olympics, and won the silver medal in the women's 78 kg, while she also represented Israel in the mixed team event, in which Team Israel came in ninth. As of November 2024, Lanir is the top ranked Israeli judoka.

== Early and personal life ==
Lanir was born in Yokneam Illit in northern Israel and later moved with her family to Yehud, Israel, and is Jewish. Her mother Michal is an architect and former judoka, while her father Ronen is a project manager. In her early years, Lanir practiced ballet and floor artistic gymnastics prior to her judo training. She feels that ballet helped her in judo a great deal, as it trained her in movement. Lanir received the status of outstanding athlete from the Israel Defense Forces and served as an HR NCO. At 18 years of age Lanir moved to the Wingate Institute where she trained ever since.

== Judo career ==
=== 2016–18; Israeli U21 Champion ===
Lanir won the silver medal in the 2016 European Cup Cadets in Antalya, Turkey, and a bronze medal in 2016 European Cup Cadets in Zagreb, Croatia. She won the gold medal in the 2016 Israeli U21 Championships in Ra'anana.

Lanir won bronze medals in the 2017 European Cup U21 in Athens, Greece, and in the 2017 European Cup Cadets in Ploiesti, Romania. She won the silver medal in the 2017 Israeli Championship in Ra'anana.

Lanir won the silver medal in the 2018 Israeli Championship in Tel Aviv.

=== 2019–21; European U23 Champion ===
Lanir won bronze medals in the 2019 European U21 Championships in Vantaa, Finland, and the 2019 European U23 Championships in Izhevsk, Russia. She won the gold medal in the 2019 Israeli Championship in Tel Aviv.

Lanir won the 2020 European U23 Championships in Poreč, Croatia, and won the bronze medal in the 2020 European Junior Championships, in Poreč. She won the gold medal in the 2020 Israeli U21 Championships in Ra'anana.

In the 2021 World Championships in Budapest, Hungary, Lanir placed 7th after winning her first two matches, losing in the quarterfinal and the repechage. That same year Lanir won a silver medal at the 2021 Baku Grand Slam, and bronze medals in the 2021 Paris Grand Slam, the 2021 Abu Dhabi Grand Slam, the 2021 Tashkent Grand Slam, and the 2021 Tbilisi Grand Slam. She won the gold medal in the 2021 Israeli Championship in Ra'annana.

=== 2020 Tokyo Olympics (in 2021); bronze medal ===
Lanir represented Israel at the 2020 Summer Olympics, competing at the women's 78 kg weight category. In her first match, she beat Mongolian Otgony Mönkhtsetseg with an 18 seconds ippon. In the round of 16, she lost to the Brazilian former two-time world champion, Mayra Aguiar, ending her part in the individual competition. She won a bronze medal in the Olympic mixed team event.

=== 2022–present; World Champion ===
In 2022, Lanir won silver medals at each of the 2022 Ulaanbaatar Grand Slam in Mongolia, 2022 Budapest Grand Slam, and 2022 Zagreb Grand Prix. She also won a bronze medal in her event at the 2022 Almada Grand Prix in Portugal.

Lanir won the 2023 World Championship in Doha, Qatar. She said: "I am happy to dedicate the medal to the residents of the south [of Israel], who are going through a difficult time, to the soldiers of the Israel Defense Forces and to the entire State of Israel. It was so important for me to do something good in such complex and difficult days."

Lanir also won the 2023 World Masters in Budapest, and the 2023 Ulaanbaatar Grand Slam. Following that, Lanir was chosen by the European Judo Union as that year's European Athlete of the Year. She won a bronze medal at the 2023 European Championships in Montpellier, France, a silver medal at the 2023 Tokyo Grand Slam, and a bronze medal at the 2023 Tbilisi Grand Slam. She won the gold medal in the 2023 Israeli Championship.

Lanir won a bronze medal at the 2024 European Championships in Zagreb.

=== 2024 Paris Olympics; Silver medal ===
Lanir won the silver medal in the women's 78 kg representing Israel at the 2024 Summer Olympics. She beat Mongolia's Otgonbayaryn Khüslen in the round of 16, the Netherlands’ Guusje Steenhuis in the round of 16, and Germany's world champion Anna-Maria Wagner in the semifinal match, before losing to Italy's Alice Bellandi in the gold medal match. She also represented Israel in the mixed team event, in which Team Israel came in ninth.

=== 2025 ===
Lanir won a silver medal at the 2025 Paris Grand Slam. She lost in the final match to Patrícia Sampaio from Portugal.

== Honors ==
Lanir and Paralympic taekwondo champion Asaf Yasur jointly shared the honor of lighting the 2026 Maccabiah Games flame as the final torchbearers, officially opening the event.

== Titles ==
Year	Tournament	Place	Ref.
2021	Grand Slam Tashkent	3rd place, bronze medalist(s)	
2021	Grand Slam Tbilisi	3rd place, bronze medalist(s)	
2021	Grand Slam Paris	3rd place, bronze medalist(s)	
2021	Grand Slam Baku	2nd place, silver medalist(s)	
2021	Grand Slam Abu Dhabi	3rd place, bronze medalist(s)	
2022	Grand Prix Almada	3rd place, bronze medalist(s)	
2022	Grand Slam Ulaanbaatar	2nd place, silver medalist(s)	
2022	Grand Slam Budapest	2nd place, silver medalist(s)	
2022	Grand Prix Zagreb	2nd place, silver medalist(s)	
2023	Grand Slam Tbilisi	3rd place, bronze medalist(s)	
2023	World Championships	1st place, gold medalist(s)	
2023	Grand Slam Ulaanbaatar	1st place, gold medalist(s)	
2023	World Masters	1st place, gold medalist(s)	
2023	European Championships	3rd place, bronze medalist(s)	
2023	Grand Slam Tokyo	2nd place, silver medalist(s)	
2024	European Championships	3rd place, bronze medalist(s)	
2024	Olympic Games	2nd place, silver medalist(s)	
2025	Grand Slam Paris	2nd place, silver medalist(s)	
2025	Grand Slam Tashkent	3rd place, bronze medalist(s)	

== See also ==
- List of select Jewish judokas
- List of Jewish Olympic medalists
- List of world champions in judo
