= 2015 World Judo Cadets Championships =

Judo competition

Judo 2015 World Judo Cadets Championships
- Venue: Zetra Olympic Hall
- Location: Sarajevo, Bosnia and Herzegovina
- Dates: 5–9 August 2015
- Competitors: 481 from 59 nations

Champions
- Men's team: Japan (1st title)
- Women's team: Japan (1st title)

Competition at external databases
- Links: IJF • EJU • JudoInside

The 2015 World Judo Cadets Championships is an edition of the World Judo Cadets Championships, organised by the International Judo Federation. It was held in Sarajevo, Bosnia and Herzegovina from 5 to 9 August 2015. The final day of competition featured men's and women's team events, both won by team Japan.

== Medal summary ==
=== Medal table ===
* Host nation (Bosnia and Herzegovina)

Rank	Nation	Gold	Silver	Bronze	Total
1	Japan (JPN)	4	1	2	7
2	Russia (RUS)	2	1	6	9
3	Netherlands (NED)	2	1	0	3
4	Italy (ITA)	1	2	0	3
5	Germany (GER)	1	1	1	3
6	Croatia (CRO)	1	1	0	2
7	Ukraine (UKR)	1	0	2	3
7	Uzbekistan (UZB)	1	0	2	3
9	Bulgaria (BUL)	1	0	0	1
9	Greece (GRE)	1	0	0	1
9	Kazakhstan (KAZ)	1	0	0	1
12	Brazil (BRA)	0	2	2	4
13	Azerbaijan (AZE)	0	2	0	2
14	Georgia (GEO)	0	1	3	4
15	Mongolia (MGL)	0	1	1	2
16	Finland (FIN)	0	1	0	1
16	Hungary (HUN)	0	1	0	1
16	Latvia (LAT)	0	1	0	1
19	Turkey (TUR)	0	0	3	3
20	Austria (AUT)	0	0	1	1
20	Belarus (BLR)	0	0	1	1
20	Bosnia and Herzegovina (BIH)*	0	0	1	1
20	France (FRA)	0	0	1	1
20	Montenegro (MNE)	0	0	1	1
20	Poland (POL)	0	0	1	1
20	Romania (ROU)	0	0	1	1
20	Serbia (SRB)	0	0	1	1
20	Tajikistan (TJK)	0	0	1	1
20	Tunisia (TUN)	0	0	1	1
Totals (29 entries)		16	16	32	64

=== Men's events ===
Event	Gold	Silver	Bronze
−50 kg	Aibolat Ystybay (KAZ)	Biagio D'Angelo (ITA)	Bayanmönkhiin Narmandakh (MGL)
−50 kg	Aibolat Ystybay (KAZ)	Biagio D'Angelo (ITA)	Kazbek Naguchev (RUS)
−55 kg	Denislav Ivanov (BUL)	Tofig Mammadov (AZE)	Khamzat Akhmarov (RUS)
−55 kg	Denislav Ivanov (BUL)	Tofig Mammadov (AZE)	Vano Khubashvili (GEO)
−60 kg	Genki Koga (JPN)	Michael Marcelino (BRA)	Akhmed Bogatyrev (RUS)
−60 kg	Genki Koga (JPN)	Michael Marcelino (BRA)	Robinzon Beglarashvili (GEO)
−66 kg	Giovanni Esposito (ITA)	Bagrati Niniashvili (GEO)	Hideyuki Ishigooka (JPN)
−66 kg	Giovanni Esposito (ITA)	Bagrati Niniashvili (GEO)	Ugur Sarikaya (TUR)
−73 kg	Vasili Balampanasvili (GRE)	Nikita Duinovs (LAT)	Jasur Sodikov (UZB)
−73 kg	Vasili Balampanasvili (GRE)	Nikita Duinovs (LAT)	Aleksandr Cherkai (UKR)
−81 kg	Falk Petersilka (GER)	Igor Morishigue (BRA)	Toni Miletić (BIH)
−81 kg	Falk Petersilka (GER)	Igor Morishigue (BRA)	Sherkhon Turaboev (UZB)
−90 kg	Simeon Catharina (NED)	Zelym Kotsoiev (AZE)	Anton Sachylovich (BLR)
−90 kg	Simeon Catharina (NED)	Zelym Kotsoiev (AZE)	Onise Saneblidze (GEO)
+90 kg	Kemal Kaitov (RUS)	Inal Tasoev (RUS)	Stephan Hegyi (AUT)
+90 kg	Kemal Kaitov (RUS)	Inal Tasoev (RUS)	Khurshed Madzhidov (TJK)
Team	Japan	Russia	Uzbekistan
Team	Japan	Russia	Georgia

=== Women's events ===
Event	Gold	Silver	Bronze
−40 kg	Olga Borisova (RUS)	Oidovchimed Baasansuren (MGL)	Lidia Marin (ROU)
−40 kg	Olga Borisova (RUS)	Oidovchimed Baasansuren (MGL)	Oumaima Bedioui (TUN)
−44 kg	Daria Bilodid (UKR)	Sofia Petitto (ITA)	Riko Igarashi (JPN)
−44 kg	Daria Bilodid (UKR)	Sofia Petitto (ITA)	Jessica Silva (BRA)
−48 kg	Diyora Keldiyorova (UZB)	Jorien Visser (NED)	Anais Mosdier (FRA)
−48 kg	Diyora Keldiyorova (UZB)	Jorien Visser (NED)	Tuğçe Beder (TUR)
−52 kg	Kana Tomizawa (JPN)	Tihea Topolovec (CRO)	Margarita Shrainer (RUS)
−52 kg	Kana Tomizawa (JPN)	Tihea Topolovec (CRO)	Irem Korkmaz (TUR)
−57 kg	Ryūko Takeda (JPN)	Emilia Kanerva (FIN)	Anna Dabrowska (POL)
−57 kg	Ryūko Takeda (JPN)	Emilia Kanerva (FIN)	Hannah Deliu (GER)
−63 kg	Sanne Vermeer (NED)	Chie Sasaki (JPN)	Hanna Kukharuk (UKR)
−63 kg	Sanne Vermeer (NED)	Chie Sasaki (JPN)	Anja Obradović (SRB)
−70 kg	Karla Prodan (CRO)	Alina Böhm (GER)	Jovana Peković (MNE)
−70 kg	Karla Prodan (CRO)	Alina Böhm (GER)	Madina Taimazova (RUS)
+70 kg	Akira Sone (JPN)	Fanni Toth (HUN)	Evgeniia Kondrashova (RUS)
+70 kg	Akira Sone (JPN)	Fanni Toth (HUN)	Beatriz Souza (BRA)
Team	Japan	Croatia	France
Team	Japan	Croatia	Russia

Source Results
