= Alice Bellandi =

Italian judoka (born 1998)

Personal information
- Born: 28 November 1998 (age 27) Brescia, Italy
- Occupation: Judoka

Sport
- Country: Italy
- Sport: Judo
- Weight class: ‍–‍70 kg, ‍–‍78 kg

Achievements and titles
- Olympic Games: (gold) (2024)
- World Champ.: (gold) (2025)
- European Champ.: (gold) (2026)
- Highest world ranking: 1^{st}
Medal record
Women's judo
Representing Italy
Olympic Games
Gold medal – first place	2024 Paris	‍–‍78 kg
World Championships
Gold medal – first place	2025 Budapest	‍–‍78 kg
Silver medal – second place	2024 Abu Dhabi	‍–‍78 kg
Bronze medal – third place	2023 Doha	‍–‍78 kg
European Championships
Gold medal – first place	2026 Tbilisi	‍–‍78 kg
Silver medal – second place	2023 Montpellier	‍–‍78 kg
Bronze medal – third place	2022 Sofia	‍–‍78 kg
World Masters
Gold medal – first place	2022 Jerusalem	‍–‍78 kg
IJF Grand Slam
Gold medal – first place	2022 Budapest	‍–‍78 kg
Gold medal – first place	2022 Baku	‍–‍78 kg
Gold medal – first place	2023 Tel Aviv	‍–‍78 kg
Gold medal – first place	2023 Abu Dhabi	‍–‍78 kg
Gold medal – first place	2026 Paris	‍–‍78 kg
Silver medal – second place	2023 Tbilisi	‍–‍78 kg
Silver medal – second place	2023 Baku	‍–‍78 kg
Silver medal – second place	2024 Paris	‍–‍78 kg
Silver medal – second place	2025 Abu Dhabi	‍–‍78 kg
Bronze medal – third place	2022 Tel Aviv	‍–‍78 kg
Bronze medal – third place	2024 Tashkent	‍–‍78 kg
IJF Grand Prix
Silver medal – second place	2019 Tel Aviv	‍–‍70 kg
Silver medal – second place	2022 Almada	‍–‍78 kg
Bronze medal – third place	2019 Tbilisi	‍–‍70 kg
World Juniors Championships
Gold medal – first place	2018 Nassau	‍–‍70 kg
European Junior Championships
Gold medal – first place	2018 Sofia	‍–‍70 kg
Bronze medal – third place	2017 Maribor	‍–‍70 kg
European Cadet Championships
Bronze medal – third place	2015 Sofia	‍–‍70 kg

Profile at external databases
- IJF: 18524
- JudoInside.com: 25518
- Updated on 19 April 2026

Alice Bellandi (born 28 November 1998) is an Italian judoka. In 2021, she competed in the women's 70 kg event at the 2020 Summer Olympics in Tokyo, Japan. In the 2024 Summer Olympics, now on the women's 78 kg category, she won the gold medal. She won gold in her event at the 2025 World Judo Championships held in Budapest, Hungary.

== Career ==
Alice Bellandi fought in the weight class up to 70 kilograms until 2021. In 2015 she won bronze medals at the 2015 European Cadet Championships and seventh at the 2015 World Cadet Championships. In 2017 she won a bronze medal at the 2017 European Junior Championships, and in 2018 she won the gold medal in the 2018 European Junior Championships and 2018 World Juniors Championship.

In 2019, Bellandi Bellandi is the silver medalist of the 2019 Judo Grand Prix Tel Aviv. It was also eliminated in the round of 16 at the European Championships held as part of the European Games in Minsk against the French Marie-Ève Gahié.

The following year she reached the semi-finals at the European Championships in Prague and then lost to the French Margaux Pinot. In the fight for bronze she lost to the Russian Madina Taimasowa. At the 2021 Olympic Games in Tokyo, she reached the quarterfinals with two wins. After defeats against the Dutch Sanne van Dijke and the Croatian Barbara Matić, Bellandi finished in seventh place.

=== 2022 ===
In 2022 Bellandi moved up to the weight class up to 78 kilograms. In January she won the silver medal in her event at the Judo Grand Prix Almada held in Almada, Portugal. In February she lost to the German Alina Böhm in the semi-finals at the 2022 Judo Grand Slam Tel Aviv and ultimately took bronze. Two months later she lost again to Alina Böhm in the semi-finals of the European Championships in Sofia. In the fight for bronze she defeated the second German Luise Malzahn. At the 2022 World Championships, Bellandi was eliminated in the round of 16 against the German Anna-Maria Wagner. Bellandi won the Grand Slam tournaments in Budapest and Baku in 2022. In the same year he also won the World Masters in Jerusalem.

=== 2023 ===
At the 2023 World Championships in Doha, she lost to Israeli Inbar Lanir in the semi-finals. With a victory over the Japanese Shori Hamada, Bellandi won a bronze medal. At the 2023 European Championships in Montpellier, Bellandi reached the final and then lost to Alina Böhm. Bellandi also won the Grand Slam tournaments in Tel Aviv and Abu Dhabi in 2023.

=== 2024: Olympic gold medal ===
Six months later, Bellandi also reached the final at the 2024 World Championships in Abu Dhabi. Again she met a German, this time she lost to Anna-Maria Wagner. At the Olympic Games in Paris, Bellandi defeated the Portuguese Patrícia Sampaio in the semifinals and the Israeli Inbar Lanir in the final.

=== 2025: World title ===
In 2025 Bellandi won gold at the 2025 World Championship defeated the German Anna Monta Olek in the final.

== Personal life ==
Bellandi is engaged to Brazilian-born South African judoka Jasmine Martin.

== Medals ==
=== Olympics ===
- (gold) Gold Medal at the 2024 Summer Olympics in Paris.

=== World Championships ===
- (gold) Gold Medal at the 2025 World Championships in Budapest.
- (silver) Silver Medal at the 2024 World Championships in Abu Dhabi.
- (bronze) Bronze Medal at the 2023 World Championships in Doha.

=== European Championships ===
- (silver) Silver Medal at the 2023 European Championships in Montpellier.
- (bronze) Bronze Medal at the 2022 European Championships in Sofia.
