= Alina Böhm =

German judoka (born 1998)

Personal information
- Born: 14 June 1998 (age 28)
- Occupation: Judoka

Sport
- Country: Germany
- Sport: Judo
- Weight class: ‍–‍78 kg

Achievements and titles
- World Champ.: 5th (2022)
- European Champ.: (gold) (2022, 2023)
Medal record
Women's judo
Representing Germany
World Championships
| Bronze medal – third place | 2022 Tashkent | Mixed team |
| Bronze medal – third place | 2025 Budapest | Mixed team |
European Championships
| Gold medal – first place | 2022 Sofia | ‍–‍78 kg |
| Gold medal – first place | 2023 Montpellier | ‍–‍78 kg |
| Bronze medal – third place | 2024 Zagreb | ‍–‍78 kg |
IJF Grand Slam
| Silver medal – second place | 2021 Abu Dhabi | ‍–‍78 kg |
| Silver medal – second place | 2022 Tel Aviv | ‍–‍78 kg |
| Silver medal – second place | 2024 Antalya | ‍–‍78 kg |
| Silver medal – second place | 2024 Dushanbe | ‍–‍78 kg |
| Silver medal – second place | 2025 Baku | ‍–‍78 kg |
| Silver medal – second place | 2025 Tashkent | ‍–‍78 kg |
| Silver medal – second place | 2026 Tbilisi | ‍–‍78 kg |
| Silver medal – second place | 2026 Astana | ‍–‍78 kg |
| Bronze medal – third place | 2022 Ulaanbaatar | ‍–‍78 kg |
| Bronze medal – third place | 2023 Antalya | ‍–‍78 kg |
| Bronze medal – third place | 2023 Abu Dhabi | ‍–‍78 kg |
| Bronze medal – third place | 2024 Tbilisi | ‍–‍78 kg |
| Bronze medal – third place | 2025 Dushanbe | ‍–‍78 kg |
| Bronze medal – third place | 2026 Ulaanbaatar | ‍–‍78 kg |
IJF Grand Prix
| Bronze medal – third place | 2023 Zagreb | ‍–‍78 kg |
| Bronze medal – third place | 2023 Perth | ‍–‍78 kg |
European U23 Championships
| Bronze medal – third place | 2019 Izhevsk | ‍–‍70 kg |
World Cadets Championships
| Silver medal – second place | 2015 Sarajevo | ‍–‍70 kg |
European Cadet Championships
| Gold medal – first place | 2015 Sofia | ‍–‍70 kg |

Profile at external databases
- IJF: 19596
- JudoInside.com: 51529
- Updated on 21 June 2026

Alina Böhm (born 14 June 1998) is a German judoka. She won the 2022 European Judo Championships in the ‍–‍78 kg category and was a part of the German team who won bronze in the mixed team event at the 2022 World Judo Championships.

Böhm posed nude in the German edition of Playboy in July 2025.
