= Audrey Tcheuméo =

French judoka (born 1990)

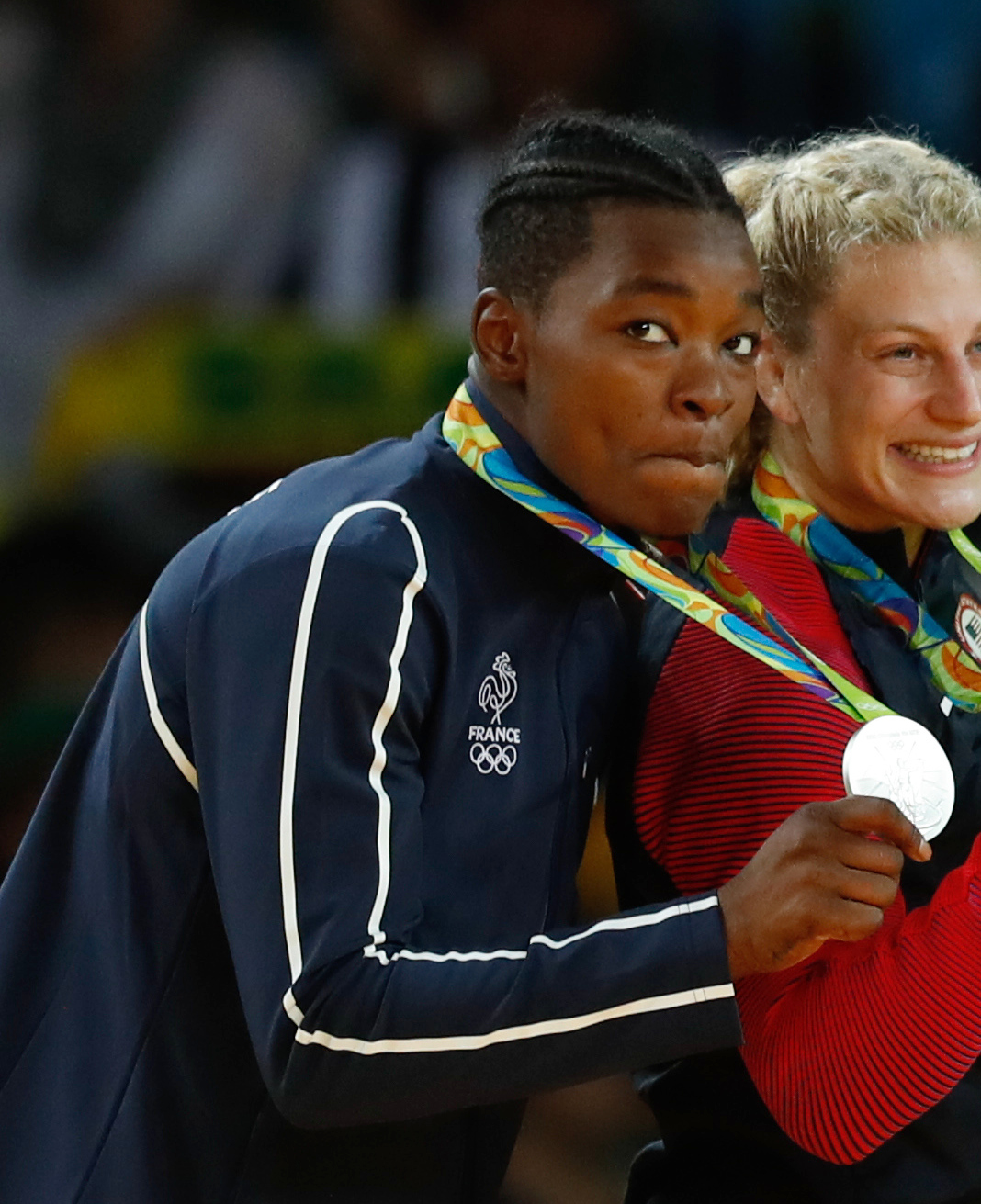

Personal information
- Born: 20 April 1990 (age 36) Bondy, France
- Occupation: Judoka
- Height: 1.77 m (5 ft 10 in)

Sport
- Country: France
- Sport: Judo
- Weight class: ‍–‍78 kg

Achievements and titles
- Olympic Games: (silver) (2016)
- World Champ.: (gold) (2011)
- European Champ.: (gold) (2011, 2014, 2016, 2017, 2024)
Medal record
Women's judo
Representing France
Olympic Games
Silver medal – second place	2016 Rio de Janeiro	‍–‍78 kg
Bronze medal – third place	2012 London	‍–‍78 kg
World Championships
Gold medal – first place	2011 Paris	‍–‍78 kg
Gold medal – first place	2014 Chelyabinsk	Women's team
Silver medal – second place	2014 Chelyabinsk	‍–‍78 kg
Silver medal – second place	2018 Baku	Mixed team
Silver medal – second place	2023 Doha	‍–‍78 kg
Bronze medal – third place	2013 Rio de Janeiro	‍–‍78 kg
European Championships
Gold medal – first place	2011 Istanbul	‍–‍78 kg
Gold medal – first place	2014 Montpellier	‍–‍78 kg
Gold medal – first place	2014 Montpellier	Women's team
Gold medal – first place	2016 Kazan	‍–‍78 kg
Gold medal – first place	2017 Warsaw	‍–‍78 kg
Gold medal – first place	2024 Zagreb	‍–‍78 kg
Silver medal – second place	2012 Chelyabinsk	‍–‍78 kg
Silver medal – second place	2013 Budapest	Women's team
Silver medal – second place	2018 Tel Aviv	‍–‍78 kg
World Masters
Silver medal – second place	2019 Qingdao	‍–‍78 kg
Silver medal – second place	2022 Jerusalem	‍–‍78 kg
Bronze medal – third place	2013 Tyumen	‍–‍78 kg
Bronze medal – third place	2015 Rabat	‍–‍78 kg
IJF Grand Slam
Gold medal – first place	2010 Tokyo	‍–‍78 kg
Gold medal – first place	2011 Paris	‍–‍78 kg
Gold medal – first place	2015 Paris	‍–‍78 kg
Gold medal – first place	2017 Paris	‍–‍78 kg
Gold medal – first place	2018 Paris	‍–‍78 kg
Gold medal – first place	2020 Budapest	‍–‍78 kg
Gold medal – first place	2022 Paris	‍–‍78 kg
Gold medal – first place	2023 Paris	‍–‍78 kg
Gold medal – first place	2023 Antalya	‍–‍78 kg
Gold medal – first place	2026 Tbilisi	‍–‍78 kg
Silver medal – second place	2010 Moscow	‍–‍78 kg
Silver medal – second place	2026 Ulaanbaatar	‍–‍78 kg
Bronze medal – third place	2010 Rio de Janeiro	‍–‍78 kg
Bronze medal – third place	2011 Rio de Janeiro	‍–‍78 kg
Bronze medal – third place	2012 Paris	‍–‍78 kg
Bronze medal – third place	2014 Paris	‍–‍78 kg
Bronze medal – third place	2017 Tokyo	‍–‍78 kg
Bronze medal – third place	2019 Brasilia	‍–‍78 kg
Bronze medal – third place	2022 Antalya	‍–‍78 kg
Bronze medal – third place	2025 Paris	‍–‍78 kg
IJF Grand Prix
Gold medal – first place	2010 Tunis	‍–‍78 kg
Gold medal – first place	2013 Miami	‍–‍78 kg
Gold medal – first place	2013 Abu Dhabi	‍–‍78 kg
Gold medal – first place	2014 Jeju	‍–‍78 kg
Gold medal – first place	2015 Jeju	‍–‍78 kg
Gold medal – first place	2016 Düsseldorf	‍–‍78 kg
Gold medal – first place	2018 Tbilisi	‍–‍78 kg
Gold medal – first place	2025 Qingdao	‍–‍78 kg
Silver medal – second place	2010 Rotterdam	‍–‍78 kg
Silver medal – second place	2014 Havana	‍–‍78 kg
Silver medal – second place	2015 Tbilisi	‍–‍78 kg
Silver medal – second place	2015 Qingdao	‍–‍78 kg
Silver medal – second place	2016 Samsun	‍–‍78 kg
Bronze medal – third place	2010 Abu Dhabi	‍–‍78 kg
Bronze medal – third place	2014 Düsseldorf	‍–‍78 kg
Bronze medal – third place	2018 Zagreb	‍–‍78 kg
European U23 Championships
Gold medal – first place	2009 Antalya	‍–‍78 kg
World Juniors Championships
Silver medal – second place	2008 Bangkok	‍–‍78 kg
European Junior Championships
Gold medal – first place	2008 Warsaw	‍–‍78 kg
Gold medal – first place	2009 Yerevan	‍–‍78 kg

Profile at external databases
- IJF: 1526
- JudoInside.com: 45804
- Updated on 21 June 2026

Audrey Tcheuméo (born 20 April 1990) is a French judoka. She won respectively bronze and silver medals in the women's −78 kg events at the 2012 and the 2016 Summer Olympics. She has also won medals at the World Judo Championships and European Judo Championships.

She won the gold medal in her event at the 2022 Judo Grand Slam Paris held in Paris, France.

She is of Cameroonian heritage.
