= Guusje Steenhuis =

Dutch judoka (born 1992)

Personal information
- Nationality: Dutch
- Born: 27 October 1992 (age 33) Grave, Netherlands
- Occupation: Judoka

Sport
- Country: Netherlands
- Sport: Judo
- Weight class: ‍–‍78 kg

Achievements and titles
- Olympic Games: 7th (2020, 2024)
- World Champ.: (silver) (2018)
- European Champ.: (silver) (2016, 2017, 2019, 2021, 2022)
Medal record
Women's judo
Representing the Netherlands
World Championships
Silver medal – second place	2018 Baku	‍–‍78 kg
Bronze medal – third place	2021 Budapest	‍–‍78 kg
Bronze medal – third place	2023 Doha	‍–‍78 kg
Bronze medal – third place	2023 Doha	Mixed team
European Games
Silver medal – second place	2019 Minsk	‍–‍78 kg
Bronze medal – third place	2015 Baku	‍–‍78 kg
European Championships
Silver medal – second place	2016 Kazan	‍–‍78 kg
Silver medal – second place	2017 Warsaw	‍–‍78 kg
Silver medal – second place	2021 Lisbon	‍–‍78 kg
Silver medal – second place	2022 Sofia	‍–‍78 kg
World Masters
Bronze medal – third place	2016 Guadalajara	‍–‍78 kg
Bronze medal – third place	2017 Saint Petersburg	‍–‍78 kg
Bronze medal – third place	2021 Doha	‍–‍78 kg
Bronze medal – third place	2022 Jerusalem	‍–‍78 kg
IJF Grand Slam
Gold medal – first place	2015 Baku	‍–‍78 kg
Gold medal – first place	2015 Tyumen	‍–‍78 kg
Gold medal – first place	2016 Baku	‍–‍78 kg
Gold medal – first place	2016 Abu Dhabi	‍–‍78 kg
Gold medal – first place	2017 Baku	‍–‍78 kg
Gold medal – first place	2018 Abu Dhabi	‍–‍78 kg
Gold medal – first place	2024 Baku	‍–‍78 kg
Silver medal – second place	2015 Tokyo	‍–‍78 kg
Silver medal – second place	2017 Tokyo	‍–‍78 kg
Silver medal – second place	2018 Paris	‍–‍78 kg
Silver medal – second place	2022 Antalya	‍–‍78 kg
Silver medal – second place	2024 Tbilisi	‍–‍78 kg
Bronze medal – third place	2014 Baku	‍–‍78 kg
Bronze medal – third place	2015 Abu Dhabi	‍–‍78 kg
Bronze medal – third place	2017 Paris	‍–‍78 kg
Bronze medal – third place	2017 Abu Dhabi	‍–‍78 kg
Bronze medal – third place	2019 Abu Dhabi	‍–‍78 kg
Bronze medal – third place	2022 Baku	‍–‍78 kg
Bronze medal – third place	2023 Paris	‍–‍78 kg
Bronze medal – third place	2024 Paris	‍–‍78 kg
IJF Grand Prix
Gold medal – first place	2017 The Hague	‍–‍78 kg
Silver medal – second place	2014 Qingdao	‍–‍78 kg
Silver medal – second place	2016 Tbilisi	‍–‍78 kg
Silver medal – second place	2016 Zagreb	‍–‍78 kg
Bronze medal – third place	2016 Düsseldorf	‍–‍78 kg
Bronze medal – third place	2018 Budapest	‍–‍78 kg
European U23 Championships
Bronze medal – third place	2013 Samokov	‍–‍78 kg
World Juniors Championships
Bronze medal – third place	2011 Cape Town	‍–‍78 kg
European Junior Championships
Gold medal – first place	2011 Lommel	‍–‍78 kg
Silver medal – second place	2010 Samokov	‍–‍78 kg

Profile at external databases
- IJF: 3389
- JudoInside.com: 44268
- Updated on 3 August 2024

Guusje Steenhuis (born 27 October 1992) is a Dutch judoka. She won the bronze medal in the 78 kg event at the 2015 European Games in Baku. She is the four-time silver medalist of European Judo Championships in the 78 kg division. She competed in the women's 78 kg event at the 2020 Summer Olympics in Tokyo, Japan.

She won the silver medal in the women's 78 kg event at the 2019 European Judo Championships which were held as part of the 2019 European Games in Minsk, Belarus.

In 2021, she won one of the bronze medals in her event at the 2021 Judo World Masters held in Doha, Qatar. A few months later, she won the silver medal in her event at the 2021 European Judo Championships held in Lisbon, Portugal.

She is openly lesbian.
