= Metka Lobnik =

Personal information
- Born: 9 April 2001 (age 25)
- Occupation: Judoka

Sport
- Country: Slovenia
- Sport: Judo
- Weight class: ‍–‍78 kg
- Club: Apolon Maribor Hoče
- Coached by: Gregor Brod, Mitja Jenuš

Achievements and titles
- Olympic Games: R32 (2024)
- World Champ.: 5th (2025)
- European Champ.: (bronze) (2026)
Medal record
Women's judo
Representing Slovenia
European Championships
Bronze medal – third place	2026 Tbilisi	‍–‍78 kg
IJF Grand Slam
Gold medal – first place	2025 Tbilisi	‍–‍78 kg
Bronze medal – third place	2026 Budapest	‍–‍78 kg
IJF Grand Prix
Gold medal – first place	2025 Lima	‍–‍78 kg
Silver medal – second place	2024 Odivelas	‍–‍78 kg
Bronze medal – third place	2025 Linz	‍–‍78 kg
Bronze medal – third place	2025 Guadalajara	‍–‍78 kg
Bronze medal – third place	2026 Linz	‍–‍78 kg
Bronze medal – third place	2026 Qingdao	‍–‍78 kg
European U23 Championships
Bronze medal – third place	2020 Poreč	‍–‍78 kg
European Junior Championships
Gold medal – first place	2020 Poreč	‍–‍78 kg
European Cadet Championships
Bronze medal – third place	2018 Sarajevo	‍–‍70 kg
Youth Olympic Games
Bronze medal – third place	2018 Buenos Aires	‍–‍78 kg
Mediterranean Games
Silver medal – second place	2026 Taranto	‍–‍78 kg
Bronze medal – third place	2026 Taranto	Mixed team

Profile at external databases
- IJF: 36876
- JudoInside.com: 111062
- Updated on 4 November 2026

Metka Lobnik (born 9 April 2001) is a Slovenian judoka. She won bronze medal in the women's 78 kg event at the 2026 European Championships held in Tbilisi, Georgia. She won silver medal at the 2026 Mediterranean Games in Taranto, Italy.

Metka made her Olympic debut in 2024, when she competed in the women's 78 kg event at the 2024 Summer Olympic Games in Paris, France, but lost in the first round of competition.

== Achievements ==
Year	Tournament	Place	Weight class
2026	European Championships	3rd	−78 kg
