= Patrícia Sampaio =

Portuguese judoka (born 1999)

Personal information
- Full name: Patrícia Fernandes Sampaio
- Born: 30 June 1999 (age 27) Tomar, Portugal
- Occupation: Judoka
- Height: 1.70 m (5 ft 7 in)

Sport
- Country: Portugal
- Sport: Judo
- Weight class: ‍–‍70 kg, ‍–‍78 kg
- Rank: 3rd dan black belt

Achievements and titles
- Olympic Games: (bronze) (2024)
- World Champ.: (bronze) (2025)
- European Champ.: (gold) (2025)
- Highest world ranking: 1^{st}
Medal record
Women's judo
Representing Portugal
Olympic Games
Bronze medal – third place	2024 Paris	‍–‍78 kg
World Championships
Bronze medal – third place	2025 Budapest	‍–‍78 kg
European Games
Silver medal – second place	2019 Minsk	Mixed team
European Championships
Gold medal – first place	2025 Podgorica	‍–‍78 kg
Bronze medal – third place	2023 Montpellier	‍–‍78 kg
IJF Grand Slam
Gold medal – first place	2025 Paris	‍–‍78 kg
Gold medal – first place	2025 Ulaanbaatar	‍–‍78 kg
Silver medal – second place	2023 Astana	‍–‍78 kg
Silver medal – second place	2025 Tokyo	‍–‍78 kg
Silver medal – second place	2026 Abu Dhabi	‍–‍78 kg
Bronze medal – third place	2022 Tel Aviv	‍–‍78 kg
Bronze medal – third place	2023 Tel Aviv	‍–‍78 kg
Bronze medal – third place	2023 Tashkent	‍–‍78 kg
Bronze medal – third place	2023 Antalya	‍–‍78 kg
Bronze medal – third place	2023 Ulaanbaatar	‍–‍78 kg
Bronze medal – third place	2024 Tokyo	‍–‍78 kg
Bronze medal – third place	2025 Tbilisi	‍–‍78 kg
Bronze medal – third place	2026 Lausanne	‍–‍78 kg
IJF Grand Prix
Gold medal – first place	2019 Perth	‍–‍78 kg
Gold medal – first place	2023 Almada	‍–‍78 kg
Bronze medal – third place	2019 Marrakesh	‍–‍78 kg
Bronze medal – third place	2019 Tbilisi	‍–‍78 kg
Bronze medal – third place	2020 Tel Aviv	‍–‍78 kg
European U23 Championships
Gold medal – first place	2021 Budapest	‍–‍78 kg
World Juniors Championships
Bronze medal – third place	2017 Zagreb	‍–‍78 kg
Bronze medal – third place	2018 Nassau	‍–‍78 kg
Bronze medal – third place	2019 Marrakesh	‍–‍78 kg
European Junior Championships
Gold medal – first place	2018 Sofia	‍–‍78 kg
Gold medal – first place	2019 Vantaa	‍–‍78 kg
European Cadet Championships
Silver medal – second place	2016 Vantaa	‍–‍70 kg

Profile at external databases
- IJF: 21235
- JudoInside.com: 95017
- Updated on 1 November 2026

Patrícia Fernandes Sampaio (born 30 June 1999) is a Portuguese judoka. In 2021, she competed in the women's 78 kg event at the 2020 Summer Olympics in Tokyo, Japan, where she reached the Round of 16. In 2024, in the Paris Olympics, she won the bronze medal.

Sampaio is the gold medalist of the 2019 Oceania Open Perth in the ‍–‍78 kg category.

Sampaio won one of the bronze medals in her event at the 2022 Tel Aviv Grand Slam held in Tel Aviv, Israel.

On 1 August 2024 Sampaio won a bronze medal in the ‍–‍78 kg category at the Paris Olympics. Sampaio had been eliminated in the semi-finals by the ranking leader in the category, Italy's Alice Bellandi—who would end up taking the gold in the competition. In the battle for the bronze, Patrícia defeated Japan's Rika Takayama with two waza-aris: the first at 1:10 (Osoto gaeshi) and the second, which would end up sealing her victory, at 3:05 (Seoi otoshi). This was the first medal for Portugal at the 2024 Summer Olympics.
