= Emma Reid (judoka) =

British judoka (born 1995)

Personal information
- Nationality: British (English)
- Born: 24 May 1995 (age 31)
- Education: Coventry University
- Occupation: Judoka

Sport
- Sport: Judo
- Weight class: ‍–‍78 kg

Achievements and titles
- Olympic Games: R32 (2024)
- World Champ.: (bronze) (2024)
- European Champ.: (silver) (2026)
- Commonwealth Games: (gold) (2022, 2026)
Medal record
Women's judo
Representing Great Britain
World Championships
Bronze medal – third place	2024 Abu Dhabi	‍–‍78 kg
European Championships
Silver medal – second place	2026 Tbilisi	‍–‍78 kg
IJF Grand Slam
Gold medal – first place	2021 Abu Dhabi	‍–‍78 kg
Gold medal – first place	2025 Dushanbe	‍–‍78 kg
Bronze medal – third place	2024 Dushanbe	‍–‍78 kg
Bronze medal – third place	2024 Astana	‍–‍78 kg
Bronze medal – third place	2026 Abu Dhabi	‍–‍78 kg
IJF Grand Prix
Silver medal – second place	2025 Linz	‍–‍78 kg
Bronze medal – third place	2021 Zagreb	‍–‍78 kg
Bronze medal – third place	2023 Almada	‍–‍78 kg
Bronze medal – third place	2025 Qingdao	‍–‍78 kg
Bronze medal – third place	2026 Zagreb	‍–‍78 kg
Representing England
Commonwealth Games
Gold medal – first place	2022 Birmingham	‍–‍78 kg
Gold medal – first place	2026 Glasgow	‍–‍78 kg

Profile at external databases
- IJF: 20993
- JudoInside.com: 69319
- Updated on 15 November 2026

Emma Reid (born 24 May 1995) is a British judoka, who competed at the 2024 Summer Olympics and won Commonwealth Games gold in 2022 and 2026.

== Biography ==
Reid studied Event management at Coventry University and won her first two British half-heavyweight titles at the British Judo Championships in 2015 and 2021.

Reid is the gold medalist of the 2021 Abu Dhabi Grand Slam in the ‍–‍78 kg category. and in 2023, Reid won the ‍–‍78 kg title for the third time at the British Judo Championships. She followed this up by retaining her title for a fourth success in 2024.

In 2024, Reid won her first World Medal after securing Bronze at the Abu Dhabi World Championships. This marked the end of the Olympic Qualification window.

Reid made her Olympic debut at the 2024 Olympic Games in Paris, exiting the competition in the round of 32.

In September 2025, Reid won a bronze medal on the IJF World Tour at the 2025 Qingdao Grand Prix.

In December 2025, Reid won the British half-heavyweight title at the British Judo Championships for the fifth time.

At the 2026 Commonwealth Games, she won the gold medal in ‍–‍78 kg division, defeating Australia's Maria Swan in the final.
