= Refugee Olympic Team =

Refugee Olympic Team at the Olympics
- Athletes compete under the Olympic flag.
- IOC code: EOR
- Medals Ranked 151st: Gold 0 Silver 0 Bronze 1 Total 1

Summer appearances
- 2016; 2020; 2024

The Refugee Olympic Team is a group made up of independent Olympic participants who are refugees. In March 2016, International Olympic Committee (IOC) President Thomas Bach announced the creation of the Refugee Olympic Athletes Team, as a symbol of hope for all refugees in the world in order to raise global awareness of the scale of the migrant crisis in Europe. In September 2017, the IOC established the Olympic Refuge Foundation to support refugees over the long term.

The Olympic flag and the Olympic Hymn are used as team symbols. The participating athletes marched in the opening ceremony of the 2016 Summer Olympics, with the team entering the stadium as the penultimate delegation, just before the host country. At the 2020 and 2024 Summer Olympics, the team entered the stadium second after Greece.

At the 2016 Summer Olympics, the team used the IOC country code ROT. At the 2020 Summer Olympics, it was changed to EOR (an abbreviation of the French Équipe olympique des réfugiés). As of 2026, no Refugee Olympic athletes had participated in the Winter Olympic Games, nor Youth Olympic Games (regardless of Summer or Winter).

The team was awarded the 2022 Princess of Asturias Award for Sport for giving athletes the opportunity in conflict zones and places where human rights are violated, preventing them from performing their sporting and personal activities.

Cindy Ngamba, a refugee from Cameroon, became the first person to win an Olympic medal for the Refugee Olympic Team, winning a bronze medal in the women's 75kg boxing event at the 2024 Summer Olympics. Kimia Alizadeh, who represented the Refugee Olympic Team at the 2020 Summer Olympics, won bronze at the 2022 European Taekwondo Championships while representing the Refugee Team, after previously winning bronze for Iran at the 2016 Summer Olympics, and before winning bronze for Bulgaria at the 2024 Summer Olympics.

== Medal tables ==
=== Medals by Summer Games ===
Games	Athletes	Gold	Silver	Bronze	Total	Rank
(Brazil) 2016 Rio de Janeiro	10	0	0	0	0	–
(Japan) 2020 Tokyo	29	0	0	0	0	–
(France) 2024 Paris	37	0	0	1	1	84
(United States) 2028 Los Angeles	future event					
(Australia) 2032 Brisbane	future event					
Total		0	0	1	1	151

=== Medals by sport ===
Sport	Gold	Silver	Bronze	Total
Boxing	0	0	1	1
Totals (1 entries)	0	0	1	1

== List of medalists ==
Medal	Name	Games	Sport	Event
Bronze	Cindy Ngamba	2024 Paris	Boxing	Women's middleweight

== Participations ==
This category was created in March 2016. The selection criteria include the sporting level, the official refugee status verified by the United Nations, the personal situation, and the background of each athlete.

=== 2016 Summer Olympics ===
Athlete	Country of origin	Host NOC	Sport	Event
James Chiengjiek	South Sudan	Kenya	Athletics	400 m
Yiech Biel	South Sudan	Kenya	Athletics	800 m
Paulo Lokoro	South Sudan	Kenya	Athletics	1500 m
Yonas Kinde	Ethiopia	Luxembourg	Athletics	Marathon
Popole Misenga	Democratic Republic of Congo	Brazil	Judo	90 kg
Rami Anis	Syria	Belgium	Swimming	100 m butterfly
Rose Lokonyen	South Sudan	Kenya	Athletics	800 m
Anjelina Lohalith	South Sudan	Kenya	Athletics	1500 m
Yolande Mabika	Democratic Republic of Congo	Brazil	Judo	70 kg
Yusra Mardini	Syria	Germany	Swimming	100 m butterfly

=== 2020 Summer Olympics ===
At its meeting in Buenos Aires in October 2018, the International Olympic Committee decided to establish the Refugee Olympic Team (EOR) for the 2020 Summer Olympics. This decision built on the legacy of the Refugee Olympic Team in 2016 and was part of the IOC's commitment to play its part in addressing the global refugee crisis and in carrying the message of solidarity and hope to millions of refugee athletes around the world.

The IOC Session tasked Olympic Solidarity with establishing the conditions of participation and defining the team identification and selection process. These elements were carried out in close collaboration with the National Olympic Committees (NOCs), the International Sports Federations, the Tokyo 2020 Organizing Committee, and the United Nations Refugee Agency (UNHCR). On 20 June 2019, the IOC released the list of Refugee Athlete Scholarship holders who wished to join the IOC Refugee Olympic Team, Tokyo 2020. This announcement was made on World Athlete Day, celebrated every year on 20 June.

The 56 Refugee Athlete Scholarship holders include the 10 athletes who were part of the first Refugee Olympic Team in 2016, new individual athletes, and a group of athletes preparing at the Tegla Loroupe Refugee Training Center in Kenya. All were assisted by Olympic Solidarity as part of its support program for refugee athletes. The IOC Refugee Olympic Team at the 2020 Tokyo Games consisted of 29 athletes—19 men and 10 women—hailing from 11 nations: Afghanistan, Cameroon, Congo, Eritrea, Ethiopia, Iraq, Iran, South Sudan, Sudan, Syria, and Venezuela. These athletes competed across 12 sports: athletics, badminton, boxing, cycling, canoeing, judo, karate, shooting, swimming, taekwondo, weightlifting, and wrestling.

Swimmer Yusra Mardini, who competed in the 2016 Rio Games as part of the first-ever Refugee Olympic Team, and marathon runner Tachlowini Gabriyesos were selected as flag bearers for the IOC Refugee Olympic Team at the 2020 Tokyo Games.

Athlete	Country of origin	Host NOC	Sport	Event
Alaa Maso	Syria	Germany	Swimming	50 m freestyle
Yusra Mardini	Syria	Germany	Swimming	100 m butterfly
Dorian Keletela	Congo	Portugal	Athletics	100 m
Rose Lokonyen	South Sudan	Kenya	Athletics	800 m
James Chiengjiek	South Sudan	Kenya	Athletics	800 m
Anjelina Lohalith	South Sudan	Kenya	Athletics	1500 m
Paulo Amotun Lokoro	South Sudan	Kenya	Athletics	1500 m
Jamal Abdelmaji Eisa Mohammed	Sudan	Israel	Athletics	5000 m
Tachlowini Gabriyesos	Eritrea	Israel	Athletics	Marathon
Aram Mahmoud	Syria	Netherlands	Badminton	Men's singles
Wessam Salamana	Syria	Germany	Boxing	63 kg
Eldric Sella	Venezuela	Trinidad and Tobago	Boxing	75 kg
Saeid Fazloula	Iran	Germany	Canoeing	K-1 1000 m
Masomah Ali Zada	Afghanistan	France	Cycling	Time Trial
Ahmad Wais	Syria	Switzerland	Cycling	Time Trial
Sanda Aldass	Syria	Netherlands	Judo	Mixed team
Ahmad Alikaj	Syria	Germany	Judo	Mixed team
Muna Dahouk	Syria	Netherlands	Judo	Mixed team
Javad Mahjoub	Iran	Canada	Judo	Mixed team
Popole Misenga	DR Congo	Brazil	Judo	Mixed team
Nigara Shaheen	Afghanistan	Russia	Judo	Mixed team
Wael Shueb	Syria	Germany	Karate	Kata
Hamoon Derafshipour	Iran	Canada	Karate	Kumite
Luna Solomon	Eritrea	Switzerland	Shooting	10 m air rifle
Dina Pouryounes	Iran	Netherlands	Taekwondo	49 kg
Kimia Alizadeh	Iran	Germany	Taekwondo	57 kg
Abdullah Sediqi	Afghanistan	Belgium	Taekwondo	68 kg
Cyrille Fagat Tchatchet II	Cameroon	Great Britain	Weightlifting	96 kg
Aker Al-Obaidi	Iraq	Austria	Wrestling	67 kg

=== 2024 Summer Olympics ===
Athlete	Country of origin	Host NOC	Sport	Event
Dorian Keletela	Republic of the Congo	France	Athletics	Men's 100 m
Musa Suliman	Sudan	Switzerland	Athletics	Men's 800 m
Dominic Lokinyomo Lobalu	South Sudan	Switzerland	Athletics	Men's 5000 m
Jamal Abdelmaji Eisa Mohammed	Sudan	Israel	Athletics	Men's 10,000 m
Tachlowini Gabriyesos	Eritrea	Israel	Athletics	Men's marathon
Mohammad Amin Alsalami	Syria	Germany	Athletics	Men's long jump
Perina Lokure Nakang	South Sudan	Kenya	Athletics	Women's 800 m
Farida Abaroge	Ethiopia	France	Athletics	Women's 1500 m
Dorsa Yavarivafa	Iran	Great Britain	Badminton	Women's singles
Omid Ahmadisafa	Iran	Germany	Boxing	Men's flyweight (51 kg)
Cindy Ngamba	Cameroon	Great Britain	Boxing	Women's middleweight (75 kg)
Manizha Talash	Afghanistan	Spain	Breaking	B-Girls
Amir Rezanejad	Iran	Germany	Canoeing	Men's slalom C-1
Fernando Jorge	Cuba	United States	Canoeing	Men's sprint C-1 1000 m
Saeid Fazloula	Iran	Germany	Canoeing	Men's sprint K-1 1000 m
Saman Soltani	Iran	Austria	Canoeing	Women's sprint K-1 500 m
Amir Ansari	Afghanistan	Great Britain	Cycling	Men's road time trial
Eyeru Tesfoam Gebru	Ethiopia	France	Cycling	Women's road race
Mohammad Rashnonezhad	Iran	Netherlands	Judo	Men's −60 kg, Mixed team
Arab Sibghatullah	Afghanistan	Germany	Judo	Men's −81 kg, Mixed team
Adnan Khankan	Syria	Germany	Judo	Men's −100 kg, Mixed team
Muna Dahouk	Syria	Netherlands	Judo	Women's −57 kg, Mixed team
Nigara Shaheen	Afghanistan	Canada	Judo	Women's −63 kg, Mixed team
Mahboubeh Barbari Zharfi	Iran	Germany	Judo	Women's +78 kg, Mixed team
Edilio Centeno Nieves	Venezuela	Mexico	Shooting	Men's 10 m air pistol
Luna Solomon	Eritrea	Switzerland	Shooting	Women's 10 m air rifle
Alaa Maso	Syria	Germany	Swimming	Men's 50 m freestyle
Yusuf Marwan	Yemen	Egypt	Swimming	Men's 100 m butterfly
Matin Balsini	Iran	Great Britain	Swimming	Men's 200 m butterfly
Hadi Tiranvalipour	Iran	Italy	Taekwondo	Men's −58 kg
Yahya Al Ghotany	Syria	Jordan	Taekwondo	Men's −68 kg
Farzad Mansouri	Afghanistan	Great Britain	Taekwondo	Men's −80 kg
Kasra Mehdipournejad	Iran	Germany	Taekwondo	Men's +80 kg
Dina Pouryounes	Iran	Netherlands	Taekwondo	Women's −49 kg
Ramiro Mora Romero	Cuba	Great Britain	Weightlifting	Men's −102 kg
Yekta Jamali	Iran	Germany	Weightlifting	Women's −81 kg
Iman Mahdavi	Iran	Italy	Wrestling	Men's freestyle −74 kg
Jamal Valizadeh	Iran	France	Wrestling	Men's Greco-Roman −60 kg

== See also ==
- EOC Refugee Team at the European Games
- Refugee Paralympic Team
