= 2016 European Judo Championships – Women's 70 kg =

Judo Women's 70 kg at the 2016 European Judo Championships
- Venue: TatNeft Arena
- Location: Kazan, Russia
- Date: 22 April
- Competitors: 23 from 20 nations

Medalists
gold medal	Gévrise Émane (3rd title)	France
silver medal	Esther Stam	Georgia
bronze medal	Fanny Estelle Posvite	France
bronze medal	Szabina Gercsák	Hungary

Competition at external databases
- Links: IJF • JudoInside

The women's 70 kg competition at the 2016 European Judo Championships was held on 22 April at the TatNeft Arena, in Kazan, Russia. Competitors in this weight class must weigh in at less than 70 kilograms (150 lb).

== Results ==
=== Finals ===
Semi-finals
Kim Polling (NED)	00
Gévrise Émane (FRA)	00
Esther Stam (GEO)	00
Fanny Estelle Posvite (FRA)	00

Final
Gévrise Émane (FRA)	10
Esther Stam (GEO)	00

=== Repechage ===
Repechage
María Bernabéu (ESP)	00
Sally Conway (GBR)	00

Third place
Sally Conway (GBR)	00
Fanny Estelle Posvite (FRA)	01

Repechage
Szabina Gercsák (HUN)	10
Bernadette Graf (AUT)	00

Third place
Szabina Gercsák (HUN)	10
Kim Polling (NED)	00

=== Pool A ===
First round
Iljana Marzok (GER)	11
Irina Gazieva (RUS)	00
Elisavet Teltsidou (GRE)	10
Juliane Robra (SUI)	00

Round of 16
Kim Polling (NED)	10
Iljana Marzok (GER)	00
María Bernabéu (ESP)	10
Elisavet Teltsidou (GRE)	00

Quarterfinals
Kim Polling (NED)	01
María Bernabéu (ESP)	00

=== Pool B ===
First round
Lola Mansour (BEL)	00
Aleksandra Samardžić (BIH)	00
Jovana Peković (MNE)	00
Lynn Mossong (LUX)	00

Round of 16
Gévrise Émane (FRA)	10
Aleksandra Samardžić (BIH)	00
Sally Conway (GBR)	10
Jovana Peković (MNE)	00

Quarterfinals
Gévrise Émane (FRA)	10
Sally Conway (GBR)	00

=== Pool C ===
First round
Esther Stam (GEO)	10
Roxane Taeymans (BEL)	00
Emilie Sook (DEN)	00
Szabina Gercsák (HUN)	10

Round of 16
Laura Vargas Koch (GER)	00
Esther Stam (GEO)	10
Katarzyna Kłys (POL)	00
Szabina Gercsák (HUN)	00

Quarterfinals
Esther Stam (GEO)	00
Szabina Gercsák (HUN)	00

=== Pool D ===
First round
Lior Wildikan (ISR)	00
Lyudmyla Drozdova (UKR)	00

Round of 16
Bernadette Graf (AUT)	01
Lior Wildikan (ISR)	00
Fanny Estelle Posvite (FRA)	10
Anka Pogačnik (SLO)	00

Quarterfinals
Bernadette Graf (AUT)	00
Fanny Estelle Posvite (FRA)	01
