= 2015 World Judo Championships – Women's 70 kg =

Judo competition

Judo Women's 70 kg at the 2015 World Judo Championships
- Venue: Alau Ice Palace
- Location: Astana, Kazakhstan
- Date: 28 August
- Competitors: 44 from 35 nations
- Total prize money: 14,000$

Medalists
gold medal	Gévrise Émane (2nd title)	France
silver medal	María Bernabéu	Spain
bronze medal	Yuri Alvear	Colombia
bronze medal	Fanny Posvite	France

Competition at external databases
- Links: IJF • JudoInside

The women's 70 kg competition of the 2015 World Judo Championships was held on 28 August 2015.

== Results ==
=== Finals ===
Semi-finals
(Spain) María Bernabéu	000
(Austria) Bernadette Graf	000
(France) Gévrise Émane	000
(Japan) Chizuru Arai	000

Final
(Spain) María Bernabéu	000
(France) Gévrise Émane	100

=== Repechage ===
Repechage		Third place
(Netherlands) Kim Polling	000
(France) Fanny Posvite	100	(France) Fanny Posvite	100
		(Japan) Chizuru Arai	000

Repechage		Third place
(Colombia) Yuri Alvear	100
(Israel) Lior Wildikan	002	(Colombia) Yuri Alvear	010
		(Austria) Bernadette Graf	001

=== Pool A ===
First Round
(Poland) Katarzyna Kłys	000
(Hungary) Anett Breitenbach	000
(Israel) Linda Bolder	000
(Spain) María Bernabéu	100
(Australia) Aoife Coughlan	000
(Brazil) Maria Portela	100

Second Round
(Netherlands) Kim Polling	001
(Croatia) Barbara Matić	000
(Poland) Katarzyna Kłys	100
(Kazakhstan) Dilbar Umiraliyeva	000
(Germany) Szaundra Diedrich	000
(Spain) María Bernabéu	100
(Mexico) Andrea Poo	000
(Brazil) Maria Portela	101

Third Round
(Netherlands) Kim Polling	010
(Poland) Katarzyna Kłys	000
(Spain) María Bernabéu	100
(Brazil) Maria Portela	000

Quarterfinals
(Netherlands) Kim Polling	000
(Spain) María Bernabéu	010

=== Pool B ===
First Round
(France) Fanny Posvite	010
(Bosnia and Herzegovina) Aleksandra Samardžić	000
(Angola) Antónia Moreira	100
(Belgium) Lola Mansour	000
(Cuba) Onix Cortés	001
(China) Chen Fei	000

Second Round
(Canada) Kelita Zupancic	000
(France) Fanny Posvite	001
(Switzerland) Juliane Robra	000
(South Korea) Kim Seong-yeon	111
(Austria) Bernadette Graf	000
(Angola) Antónia Moreira	000
(Cuba) Onix Cortés	000
(Russia) Irina Gazieva	100

Third Round
(France) Fanny Posvite	100
(South Korea) Kim Seong-yeon	000
(Austria) Bernadette Graf	010
(Russia) Irina Gazieva	000

Quarterfinals
(France) Fanny Posvite	000
(Austria) Bernadette Graf	000

=== Pool C ===
First Round
(United States) Kathleen Sell	000
(Tunisia) Houda Miled	102
(Hungary) Szabina Gercsák	000
(Uzbekistan) Gulnoza Matniyazova	002
(Netherlands) Sanne van Dijke	110
(Kyrgyzstan) Aizhan Kadyrbekova	000

Second Round
(Colombia) Yuri Alvear	110
(Tunisia) Houda Miled	000
(Uzbekistan) Gulnoza Matniyazova	010
(New Zealand) Moira de Villiers	000
(France) Gévrise Émane	001
(Netherlands) Sanne van Dijke	000
(Luxembourg) Lynn Mossong	000
(Canada) Alix Renaud-Roy	010

Third Round
(Colombia) Yuri Alvear	000
(Uzbekistan) Gulnoza Matniyazova	000
(France) Gévrise Émane	100
(Canada) Alix Renaud-Roy	000

Quarterfinals
(Colombia) Yuri Alvear	000
(France) Gévrise Émane	002

=== Pool D ===
First Round
(Kazakhstan) Zhanar Kashkyn	000
(Ecuador) Vanessa Chala	000
(Israel) Lior Wildikan	101
(Puerto Rico) María Pérez	000
(Morocco) Assmaa Niang	100
(Belgium) Roxane Taeymans	000

Second Round
(Germany) Laura Vargas Koch	000
(Ecuador) Vanessa Chala	100
(Israel) Lior Wildikan	100
(China) Zhou Chao	001
(United Kingdom) Sally Conway	000
(Japan) Chizuru Arai	001
(Georgia (country)) Esther Stam	000
(Morocco) Assmaa Niang	000

Third Round
(Ecuador) Vanessa Chala	000
(Israel) Lior Wildikan	110
(Japan) Chizuru Arai	100
(Georgia (country)) Esther Stam	000

Quarterfinals
(Israel) Lior Wildikan	000
(Japan) Chizuru Arai	100

== Prize money ==
The sums listed bring the total prizes awarded to $14,000 for the individual event.

Medal	Total	Judoka	Coach
Gold	$6,000	$4,800	$1,200
Silver	$4,000	$3,200	$800
Bronze	$2,000	$1,600	$400
