= Judo at the 2015 European Games – Women's 70 kg =

Judo competition

Judo Women's 70 kg at the 2015 European Games
- Venue: Heydar Aliyev Arena
- Location: Baku, Azerbaijan
- Date: 26 June
- Competitors: 29 from 21 nations

Medalists
gold medal	Kim Polling (3rd title)	Netherlands
silver medal	Laura Vargas Koch	Germany
bronze medal	Bernadette Graf	Austria
bronze medal	Szaundra Diedrich	Germany

Competition at external databases
- Links: IJF • JudoInside

The women's 70 kg judo event at the 2015 European Games in Baku was held on 26 June at the Heydar Aliyev Arena.

== Results ==
=== Final ===
Final
Kim Polling (NED)	100
Laura Vargas Koch (GER)	000

=== Repechage ===
Repechage
Szabina Gercsák (HUN)	100
Sally Conway (GBR)	000

Third place
Szabina Gercsák (HUN)	000
Bernadette Graf (AUT)	000

Repechage
Juliane Robra (SUI)	000
Katarzyna Kłys (POL)	011

Third place
Katarzyna Kłys (POL)	000
Szaundra Diedrich (GER)	100

=== Top half ===
Round of 32
Valida Mirzazada (AZE)	000
Roxane Taeymans (BEL)	101
Linda Bolder (ISR)	000
Szabina Gercsák (HUN)	011
Alena Eiglová (CZE)	000
María Bernabéu (ESP)	100
Sally Conway (GBR)	100
Aleksandra Samardžić (BIH)	000
Esther Stam (GEO)	000
Giulia Cantoni (ITA)	000
Gévrise Émane (FRA)	100
Irina Gazieva (RUS)	000
Lynn Mossong (LUX)	000
Szaundra Diedrich (GER)	000

Round of 16
Kim Polling (NED)	100
Roxane Taeymans (BEL)	000
Szabina Gercsák (HUN)	000
María Bernabéu (ESP)	000
Sally Conway (GBR)	101
Esther Stam (GEO)	001
Gévrise Émane (FRA)	011
Szaundra Diedrich (GER)	100

Quarterfinals
Kim Polling (NED)	100
Szabina Gercsák (HUN)	000
Sally Conway (GBR)	000
Szaundra Diedrich (GER)	100

Semifinals
Kim Polling (NED)	110
Szaundra Diedrich (GER)	000

=== Bottom half ===
Round of 32
Şükran Bakacak (TUR)	000
Lior Wildikan (ISR)	001
Barbara Matić (CRO)	100
Nargiz Ibrahimova (AZE)	000
Juliane Robra (SUI)	011
Anka Pogačnik (SLO)	000
Anett Breitenbach (HUN)	100
Marie-Ève Gahié (FRA)	001
Katarzyna Kłys (POL)	002
Megan Fletcher (GBR)	000
Lola Mansour (BEL)	101
Nino Odzelashvili (GEO)	000

Round of 16
Laura Vargas Koch (GER)	100
Lior Wildikan (ISR)	000
Barbara Matić (CRO)	000
Juliane Robra (SUI)	110
Bernadette Graf (AUT)	001
Anett Breitenbach (HUN)	000
Katarzyna Kłys (POL)	101
Lola Mansour (BEL)	000

Quarterfinals
Laura Vargas Koch (GER)	011
Juliane Robra (SUI)	000
Bernadette Graf (AUT)	100
Katarzyna Kłys (POL)	000

Semifinals
Laura Vargas Koch (GER)	112
Bernadette Graf (AUT)	000
