= Yolande Mabika =

Congolese udoka

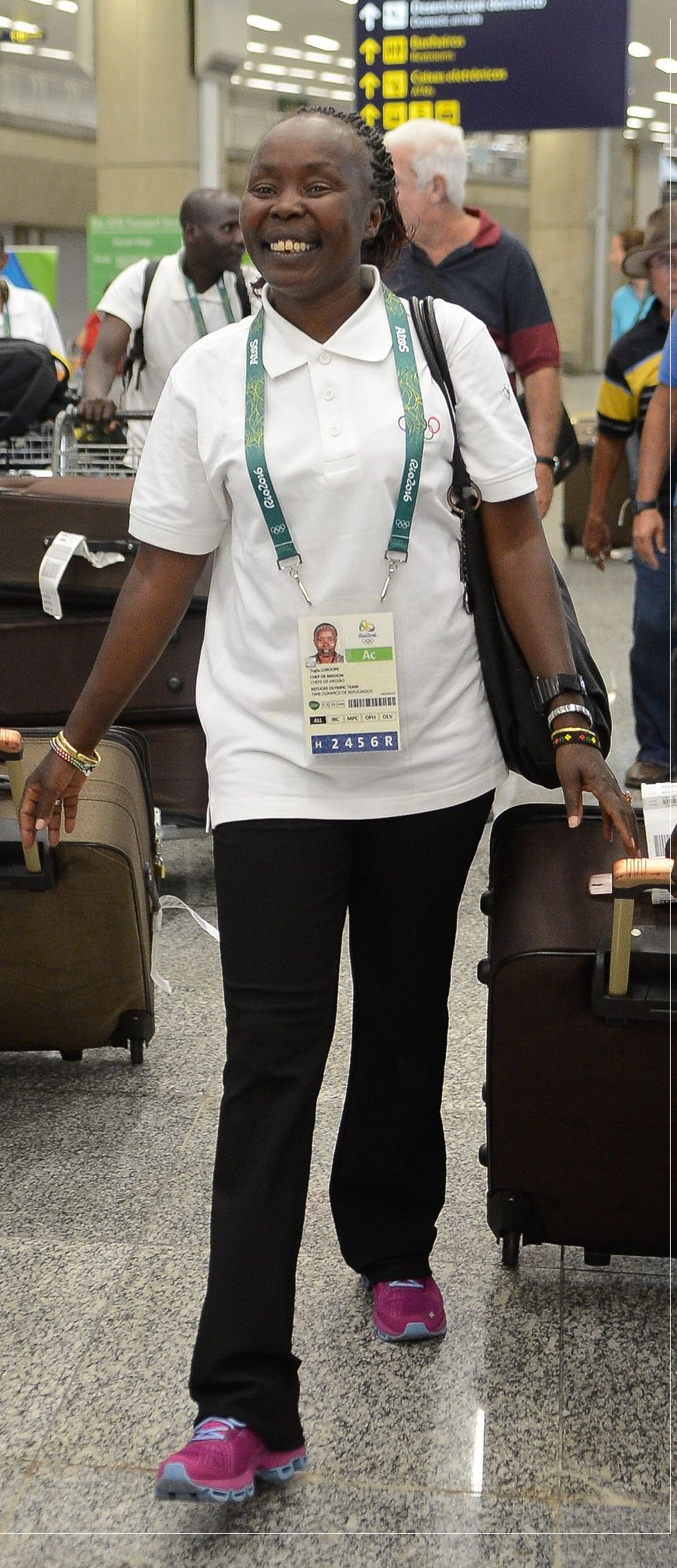

Personal information
- Born: 8 September 1987 (age 38) Bukavu, Zaire
- Occupation: Judoka

Sport
- Country: Refugee Olympic Team
- Sport: Judo

Profile at external databases
- JudoInside.com: 106566

Yolande Bukasa Mabika (born 8 September 1987) is a Congolese-born Brazilian judoka who was selected by the International Olympic Committee (IOC) to compete for the Refugee Olympic Team at the 2016 Summer Olympics in Rio de Janeiro, Brazil. She competed in the women's 70 kg event, losing her first round match against Israeli Linda Bolder.

== Personal life ==
Mabika was born on 8 September 1987. She is from the Bukavu area of the Democratic Republic of the Congo, an area severely affected by the Second Congo War. During the conflict she was separated from her parents and was taken to a children's home in the capital Kinshasa. There she took up judo, a sport the Congolese government advocated for orphans to take as an ideal way to seek some structure.

She sought political asylum in Brazil after travelling there to compete in the 2013 World Judo Championships along with fellow judoka Popole Misenga. The coaches confiscated their money and passports and left them confined in their hotel rooms. After two days barely eating, Mabika escaped the team hotel and went looking for help on the streets. Two days of wandering later, she found a community of Congolese immigrants in the Brás de Pina neighborhood, and the next day went to the hotel to get Misenga. The pair claimed that their judo coaches deprived them of food and locked them in cages when they did not perform well. The United Nations High Commissioner for Refugees (UNHCR) officially granted Mabika refugee status in September 2014. She lives in various homes in a favela of the Cordovil neighborhood.

== Judo ==
In 2013, she qualified for the World Judo Championships held in Brazil. However, she never competed in the competition, leaving to find help, eventually seeking asylum and remaining in the country. In Brazil she started training at the Instituto Reação, a judo school founded by Olympic bronze medallist Flávio Canto and now trains under coach Geraldo Bernardes in Rio de Janeiro. Before joining Reação in 2015, Mabika even slept on the street, and worked as a sweeper and at a textile mill. She received support and funding from the IOC's Olympic Solidarity programme.

On 3 June 2016 the IOC announced that Mabika would be part of a team of ten athletes selected to compete as part of the first ever Refugee Olympic Team at the 2016 Summer Olympics in Rio de Janeiro, Brazil.

She competed in the women's 70 kg event. She lost her first round match against Israeli Linda Bolder on August 10, subjected to a choke hold just over a minute into the bout.
