= Yiech Biel =

South Sudanese middle-distance runner (born 1995)

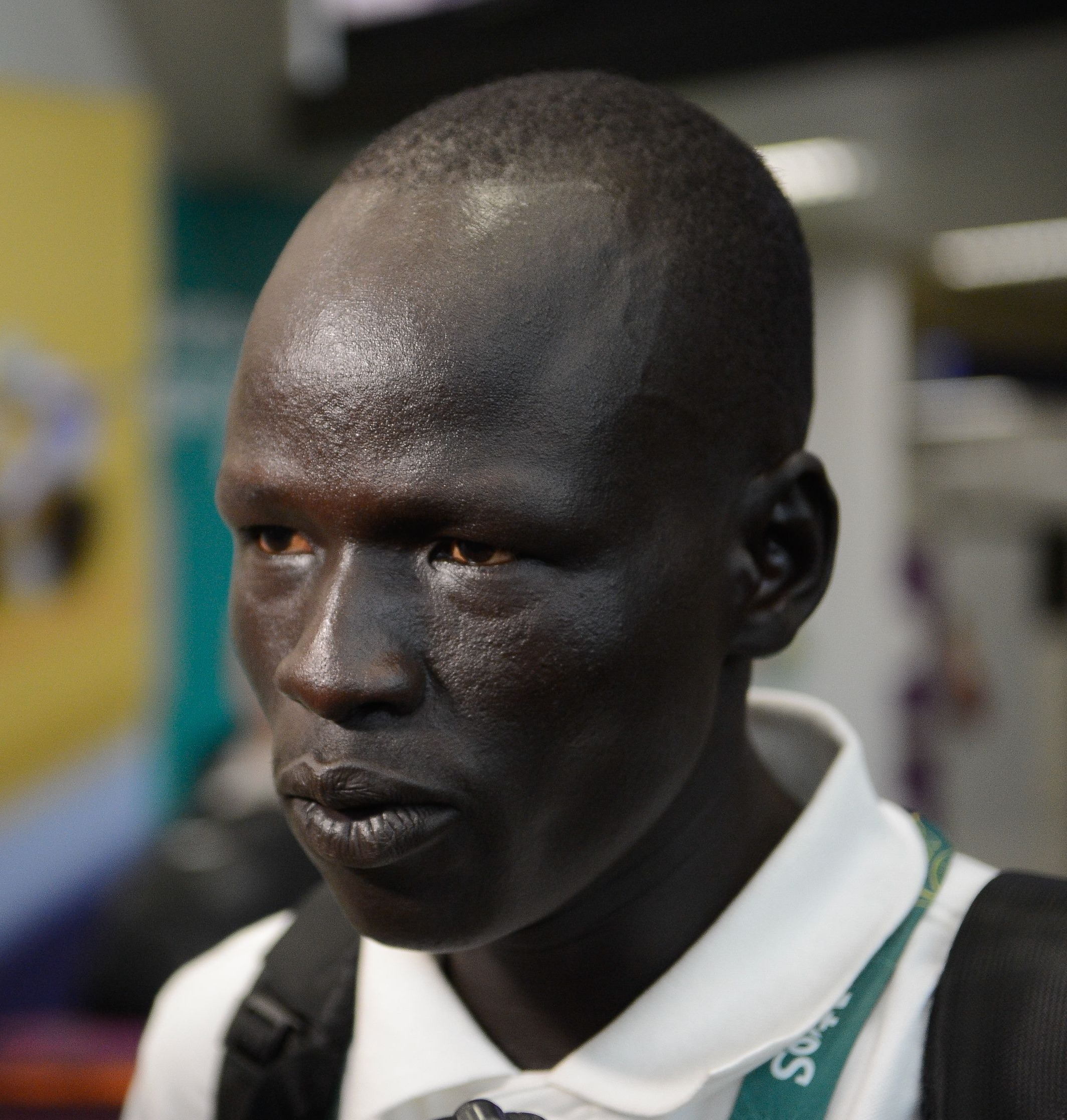
- Biel at the 2016 Olympics

Personal information
- Nationality: South Sudanese
- Born: 1995 (age 30–31) Nasir, Sudan (now South Sudan)
- Education: Iowa Central Community College Drake University
- Height: 178 cm (5 ft 10 in)
- Weight: 62 kg (137 lb)

Sport
- Sport: Athletics
- Event: 800 1600 5k 10k
- Club: Tegla Loroupe Foundation ICCC XC AND TRACK‘20
- Coached by: Tegla Loroupe

Achievements and titles
- Personal best: 1:54.67 (2016)

Yiech Pur Biel (born 1995, credited as January 1) is a track and field athlete and UNHCR goodwill ambassador originally from Nasir, South Sudan, but now living and training in the United States. He was selected by the International Olympic Committee (IOC) to compete for the Refugee Olympic Team in the 800 m event at the 2016 Summer Olympics. He placed last in his heat.

In 2005 he fled from his home town of Nasir in Sudan to escape a civil war. After living in the Kakuma Refugee Camp for 10 years, he started running competitively in 2015. The Kakuma refugee camp is one of the largest refugee camps in the world with over 179,000 people. According to Biel there were no facilities, he even didn't have shoes and not a gym. Also the weather does not favour training because from morning until evening it is sunny and hot. In 2015 he was selected to join the Tegla Loroupe Foundation, that holds athletic trials in Kakuma. There he trained under Tegla Loroupe in Nairobi, along with four other middle-distance runners from South Sudan selected for the Olympic refugee team within a joint initiative by the International Olympic Committee (IOC) and the United Nations Refugee Agency (UNHCR).

Since competing at Rio, Pur has travelled to 26 countries as an athlete and advocate for refugees, speaking at events in New York and Paris and returning to Kakuma to deliver a TEDx speech. He joined the Olympic Refuge Foundation as a board member upon its founding in 2017. On behalf of the 2016 Refugee Olympic Team, Pur and fellow Refugee Olympian Yusra Mardini received the International Crisis Group's Stephen J. Solarz Award. In August 2020, Pur was selected to be a Goodwill Ambassador for UNHCR. At the delayed 2020 Summer Olympics in Tokyo, Pur served as manager of the Refugee Olympic Team. In February 2022 he was elected to serve an eight-year term as a member of the International Olympic Committee, becoming the first UNHCR-recognised refugee to be elected to the body.

== Competitions ==
Year	Competition	Venue	Position	Event	Notes
Representing Refugee Athletes
2016	Summer Olympics	Rio de Janeiro, Brazil	8th (h)	800 m	1:54.67
2017	Asian Indoor and Martial Arts Games	Ashgabat, Turkmenistan	5th (s)	800 m	1:56.53
2018	African Championships	Asaba, Nigeria	31st (h)	800 m	1:53.20
