= Tachlowini Gabriyesos =

Eritrean long-distance runner (born 1998)

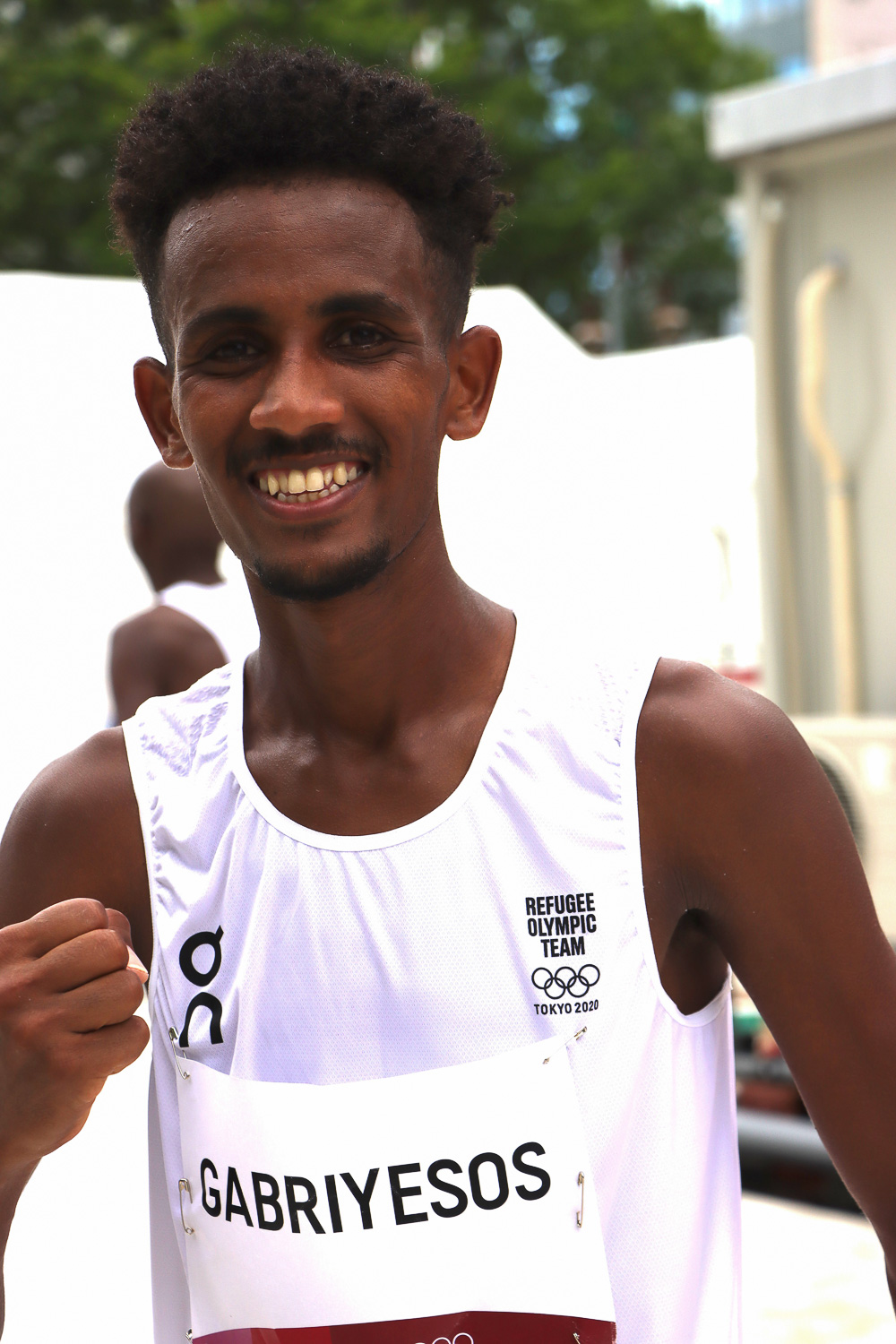
- Tachlowini Gabriyesos after the Tokyo 2020 Olympic Games marathon in Sapporo

Personal information
- Full name: Tachlowini Melake Gabriyesos
- Nickname: Louie
- National team: ART; Refugee Olympic Team
- Born: 1998 (age 27–28) Eritrea
- Education: Hadassah Neurim

Sport
- Sport: Athletics
- Events: Marathon, long-distance
- Club: Hapoel Emek Hefer
- Coached by: Alemayu Faloro

Achievements and titles
- Personal bests: Marathon: 2:09.00 (Sevilla 2023); Half marathon: 1:02:21 (2020); 10,000m: 28:47.67 (Tel Aviv 2020)

Tachlowini Melake Gabriyesos (born 1998) is an Eritrean-born long-distance runner. He lives and trains in Tel Aviv, Israel, where he runs with the Emek Hefer club and is supported by an International Olympic Committee (IOC) Refugee Athlete Scholarship. He has competed over 3000 metres, 5000 metres, 10,000 metres, the half marathon, and the marathon. He finished in 16th place at the 2020 Olympics.

== Early life and background ==
Tachlowini Melake Gabriyesos is the second of seven children. He and a friend fled Eritrea in 2010, at just 12 years of age, to escape escalating violence. Tachlowini said: "a lot of people at the time were leaving Eritrea, and we were just thinking together that we wanted to go to another place, where we could live like human beings and have opportunity". Soldiers began barging into houses in search of people to fight in the army, leading to Tachlowini's evacuation. Alongside childhood friends, Tachlowini travelled to Ethiopia via walking, arriving alongside numerous groups of migrating Eritreans.

In Ethiopia, Tachlowini telephoned an aunt of his who had also sought refuge. She invited him to her location in Israel and gave him instructions to turn back toward Sudan. In advance of this, Tachlowini had brought the family member to Israel by paying Bedouin traffickers to bring her on a ferry to the Israeli border. Similarly, Tachlowini went from Sudan to Egypt with the same human traffickers, carried on a small truck alongside 20 to 30 people. Afterwards, they crossed the Sinai Desert into Israel. Tachlowini witnessed the traffickers abuse, exploit, and commit unspeakable acts of violence against other refugees fearing expulsion or murder.

=== Settling in Israel ===
Upon his arrival, Israel officials classified Tachlowini as an asylum seeker and sent him to a detention facility intended for holding unaccompanied minors. At the Holot centre, Tachlowini was processed and medically checked. He was entered into the Hadassah Neurim Youth Village, a boarding school north of Tel Aviv and safe haven for at-risk youth alongside children from destitute backgrounds. Immigrants from Ethiopia and the former Soviet Union comprise over half of the student population. The school offered a running programme that he participated in, leading him to his current coach Alemayu Faloro.

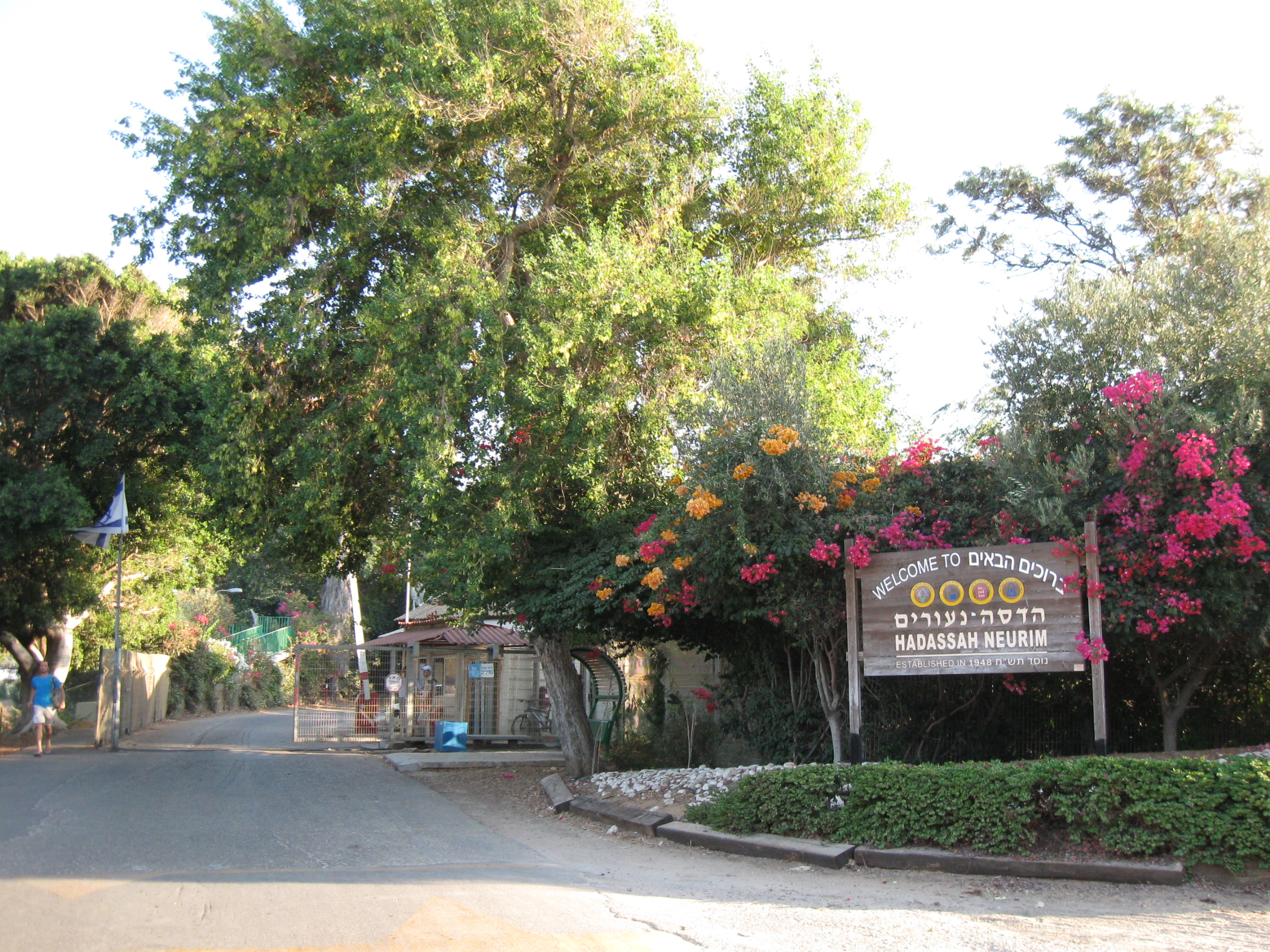
Tachlowini studied at the Hadassah Neurim Youth Village in Israel

Tachlowini completed school at Hadassah Neurim, where many of the kids nicknamed him Louie, and is now allowed to legally reside in Israel at the Youth Village with his adoptive family. He and his aunt speak every month or so, however, he still has little communication with his parents back in Eritrea. Internet availability between Israel and his parents' village creates difficulty to communicate frequently, therefore, they only talk every four or five months.

== Career ==
=== 2019: World Championships ===
Tachlowini was selected as one of six athletes to compete for the Athlete Refugee Team (ART) at the 2019 World Championships in Doha, Qatar, where he ran in the 5000m. Prior to the event, while he was traveling, he was delayed for 27 hours at the airport in Turkey due to problems with his visa. He finished 34th in the trial heats, leading to speculation delay issues impacted Tachlowini's performance.

=== 2020 ===
In October 2020, he was selected to represent the Refugee Team in the World Athletics Half-Marathon Championships in Gdynia, Poland. However, visa issues intervened again, and he could not travel. Two months afterward, he ran a half-marathon personal best of 1:02:21 at Gan HaShlosha National Park in Israel.

=== 2021: Olympics ===
On 14 March 2021, Tachlowini ran the Olympic marathon qualifying time of less than 2:11:30. He did so in 2:10:55 at Hula Lake Park in Israel and became the first refugee athlete to clock a qualifying standard for the Olympics. It was only the second time he ever competed over that distance.

He was subsequently selected as one of 29 athletes across 12 disciplines to represent the Refugee Olympic Team (ROT) at the 2020 Olympics in Tokyo, Japan. Additionally, he was awarded the honour of being the flag bearer for the team during the opening ceremony of the Games.

== Competitions ==
Year	Competition	Venue	Position	Event	Notes
Representing the Athlete Refugee Team (World Athletics and European Athletics competitions) and Refugee Olympic Team (at the 2020 Olympic Games)
2019	World Championships	Doha, Qatar	34th (h)	5000 m	14:28.11
2021	European 10,000m Cup	Birmingham, Great Britain	48th	10.000 m	30:29.91
2021	Olympic Games	Sapporo, Japan	16th	Marathon	2:14:02
2021	European Cross Country Championships	Dublin, Ireland	49th	10km XC	32:19
2022	European 10,000m Cup	Pacé, France	52nd	10.000 m	30:36.01
2022	European Championships	Munich, Germany	—	Marathon	DNF
2022	European Cross Country Championships	Turin, Italy	51st	9,572 m XC	31:38
2024	Olympic Games	Paris, France	42nd	Marathon	2:12:47

Olympic Games
Preceded by Rose Lokonyen	Flagbearer for Refugee Olympic Team (with Yusra Mardini); Tokyo 2020	Succeeded by Incumbent
