= Popole Misenga =

Congolese judoka (born 1992)

Personal information
- Born: 25 February 1992 (age 34) Bukavu, Zaire
- Occupation: Judoka

Sport
- Country: Refugee Olympic Team
- Sport: Judo
- Weight class: –90 kg

Profile at external databases
- IJF: 10527
- JudoInside.com: 70106
- Updated on 3 November 2021

Popole Misenga (born 25 February 1992) is a judoka originally from the Democratic Republic of the Congo, who was selected by the International Olympic Committee (IOC) to compete for the Refugee Olympic Team at the 2016 Summer Olympics in Rio de Janeiro, Brazil.

== Personal life ==
Misenga was born on 25 February 1992. He is from the Bukavu area of the Democratic Republic of the Congo, an area severely affected by the Second Congo War. After his mother was murdered when he was nine years old, he fled to a nearby rainforest and wandered for a week, before being rescued and taken to a home in Kinshasa.

He sought political asylum in Brazil after travelling there to compete in the 2013 World Judo Championships along with fellow judoka Yolande Mabika. The pair claimed that their coaches confined them in their hotel room while leaving with their money, passports and meal tickets. After two days barely eating, Mabika escaped, and Misenga waited more days only for the staff to arrive on the day of the competition, smelling of alcohol. The following day, Mabika returned to the hotel and convinced Misenga to desert, and both were taken by an Angolan to the African immigrant-heavy neighborhood of Brás de Pina. They also stated that back in Congo, their judo coaches deprived them of food and locked them in cages when they did not perform well. The United Nations High Commissioner for Refugees (UNHCR) officially granted Misenga refugee status in September 2014.

He is now married to a Brazilian woman, with whom he has two children.

== Judo ==
Misenga first took up judo at a centre for displaced children in Kinshasa. In 2010 he won a bronze medal at the African under-20 Judo Championships.

At the 2013 World Judo Championships held in Brazil he was eliminated in the first round of his competition after losing to Islam Bozbayev of Kazakhstan. Following this tournament he sought asylum in Brazil and remained in the country. In Brazil he started training at the Instituto Reação, a judo school founded by Olympic bronze medallist Flávio Canto, and now trains under coach Geraldo Bernardes in Rio de Janeiro. Before being taken by Reação, Misenga had odd jobs at truck crews. He received support and funding from the IOC's Olympic Solidarity programme.

On 3 June 2016 the IOC announced that Misenga would be part of a team of ten athletes selected to compete as part of a Refugee Olympic Team at the 2016 Summer Olympics in Rio de Janeiro, Brazil. In the men's 90 kg event, Misenga won his first bout against Avtar Singh of India, but lost against South Korea's Gwak Dong-han.

Misenga has continued to practice judo, taking part in events such as the 2019 World Judo Championships and a second Olympic appearance as part of the Refugee Olympic Team in the 2020 Summer Olympics in Tokyo, Japan. He has however noted that his amount of competitions is limited by how travel visas are denied to refugees.
