= Refugee Olympic Team at the 2016 Summer Olympics =

- Individuals competed under the Olympic Flag
- IOC code: EOR (ROT used at these Games)

in Rio de Janeiro
- Competitors: 10 in 3 sports
- Flag bearers: Rose Lokonyen (opening); Popole Misenga (closing)
- Medals: Gold 0 Silver 0 Bronze 0 Total 0

Summer Olympics appearances (overview)
- 2016; 2020; 2024; 2028

The Refugee Olympic Team competed at the 2016 Summer Olympics in Rio de Janeiro, Brazil, from 5 to 21 August 2016, as independent Olympic participants.

In March 2016, the International Olympic Committee (IOC) President Thomas Bach declared that the IOC would choose five to ten refugees to compete at the 2016 Summer Olympics, in the context of the "worldwide refugee crisis", of which the European migrant crisis is a prominent part. Additionally, as part of an effort "to show solidarity with the world's refugees", the United Nations Refugee Agency selected Ibrahim Al-Hussein, a Syrian refugee residing in Athens, Greece, to carry the Olympic flame through the Eleonas refugee and migrant camp in the city as part of the 2016 torch relay.

Initially, the team was named "Team of Refugee Olympic Athletes", with the IOC country code ROA, but in June 2016 this was changed to Refugee Olympic Team with the country code ROT.

The athletes officially competed under the Olympic Flag. The Refugee Nation flag was also used in an unofficial capacity to represent the team.

== Team selection and funding ==
The IOC identified 43 potential candidates for inclusion in the team with the final selection to take into account sporting ability, personal circumstances, and United Nations-verified refugee status. In order to pay for athlete training, a fund of US$2 million was created by the IOC. National Olympic Committees (NOCs) were then asked to identify any displaced athletes in their countries who might be able to reach Olympic standard.

An initial three athletes were identified as potential competitors for Rio; Yusra Mardini, a 17-year-old Syrian swimmer, who crossed from Turkey into Greece in an inflatable boat (swimming after its motor had stopped) before crossing Europe by train through mainland Greece, the Balkans, Hungary and Austria to eventually reach Germany where she now lives and trains; Raheleh Asemani, an Iranian taekwondo athlete training in Belgium; and judoka Popole Misenga, originally from the Democratic Republic of Congo but now living in Brazil. Mardini and Asemani have received IOC Olympic Solidarity scholarships. Asemani was later granted Belgian citizenship and applied to compete instead for the Belgian team, with International Olympic Committee (IOC) President Thomas Bach saying that such permission was expected to be granted.

Additional candidates were identified: among refugees of the Syrian Civil War, cyclists Ahmad Badreddin Wais and Nazir Jaser and triathlete Mohamad Masoo; and in Kakuma refugee camp in Kenya, where a support program run by former marathon world record holder Tegla Loroupe identified 23 athletes.

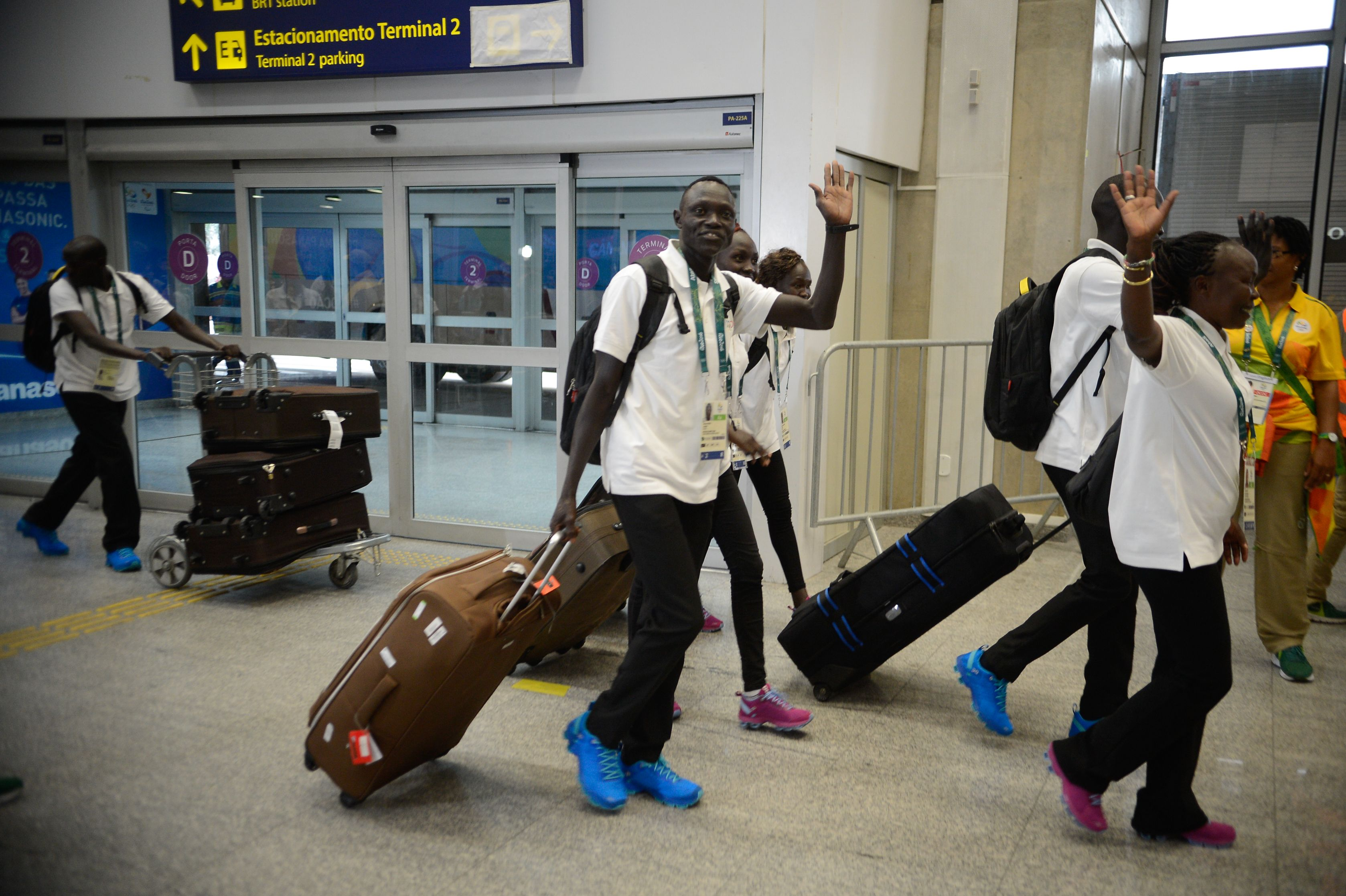
Refugee Olympic team arriving in Rio de Janeiro

On 3 June 2016, the IOC announced a team of ten athletes would compete as part of the refugee team at the Games. The team was led by Loroupe, who acted as a "peace ambassador". Rose Lokonyen was selected as the flag bearer for the opening ceremony, and judoka Popole Misenga was chosen to carry the flag for the closing ceremony.

Athlete	Country of origin	Host NOC	Sport	Event
James Chiengjiek	South Sudan	Kenya	Athletics	400 m
Yiech Biel	South Sudan	Kenya	Athletics	800 m
Paulo Lokoro	South Sudan	Kenya	Athletics	1500 m
Yonas Kinde	Ethiopia	Luxembourg	Athletics	Marathon
Popole Misenga	Democratic Republic of Congo	Brazil	Judo	90 kg
Rami Anis	Syria	Belgium	Swimming	100 m butterfly
Rose Lokonyen	South Sudan	Kenya	Athletics	800 m
Anjelina Lohalith	South Sudan	Kenya	Athletics	1500 m
Yolande Mabika	Democratic Republic of Congo	Brazil	Judo	70 kg
Yusra Mardini	Syria	Germany	Swimming	100 m freestyle

== Athletics ==
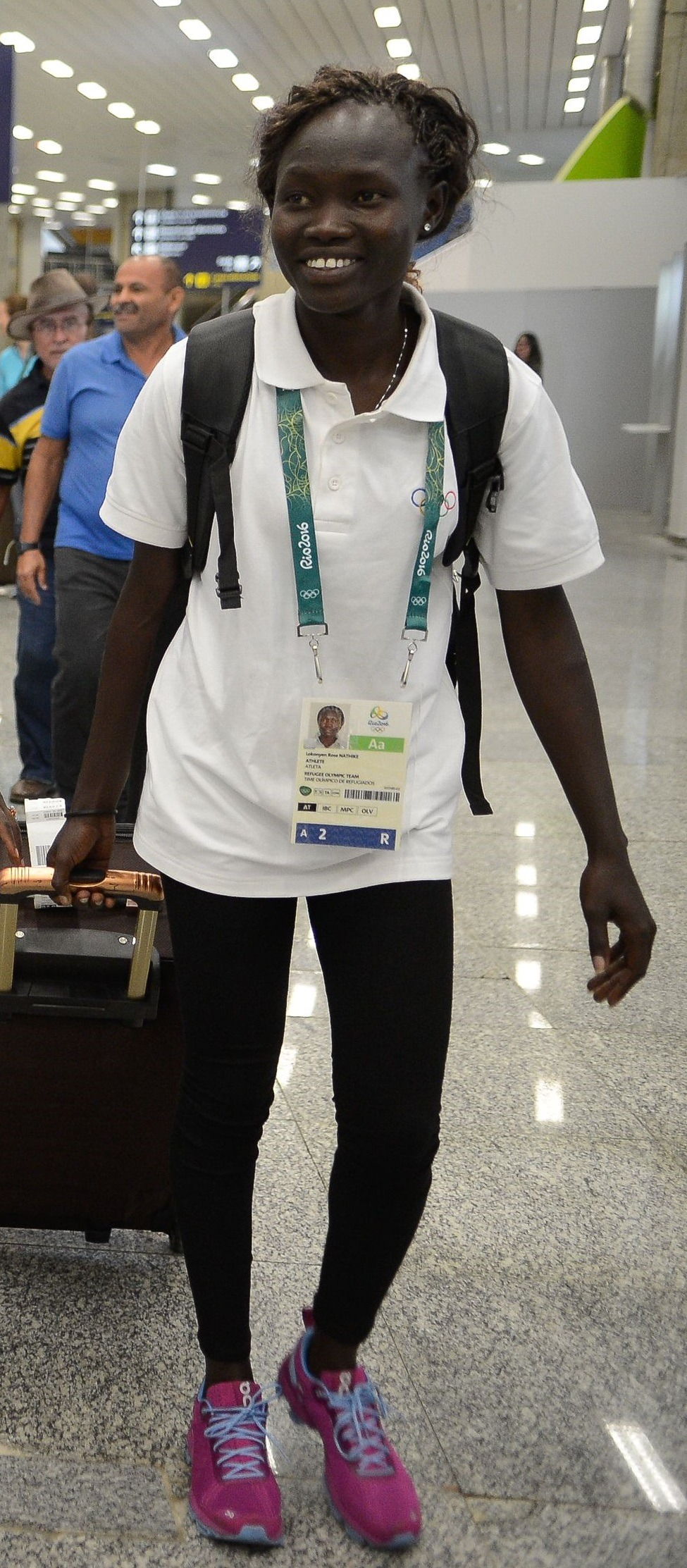
Rose Lokonyen arriving in Rio de Janeiro for the Olympic Games

Four men and two women competed in the Games in the athletics competitions. Yonas Kinde is originally from Ethiopia and was 36 years old at the time of these Olympics, and competed in the men's Marathon. On 21 August, he finished the Marathon in 2 hours, 24 minutes and 8 seconds which put him in 90th place out of 140 classified finishers. James Chiengjiek, originally from South Sudan was 24 years old at the time. He took part in the 400 meters, Assigned to the fourth heat, he finished in a time of 52.89 seconds, which was eighth in the heat. Only the top three from each heat, plus the next three fastest overall, were allowed to progress, meaning he was eliminated. Yiech Biel, also originally from South Sudan, was 21 at the time of the Olympics. Biel's race was the 800 m meters, where he finished eighth in his heat with a time of 1 minute and 54.67 seconds, insufficient to qualify for the next round.

Rose Lokonyen, also from South Sudan, was 21 years of age at the time of the Rio Olympics. She raced in the 800 meters and was seventh in her heat with a time of 2 minutes and 16.64 seconds. In this race, the top two from each heat, as well as the next eight fastest overall qualified to move on, but Lokonyen's time was not fast enough to do so. Anjelina Lohalith was 23 at the time of these Olympics and was also originally from South Sudan. She ran in the women's 1500 meters race, and finished 14th and last in her heat with a time of 4 minutes and 47.38 seconds, eliminating her from the competition. Paulo Lokoro ran the men's 1500 meters; he was 24 years old and originally from South Sudan. He finished 11th in his heat with a time of 4 minutes and 3.96 seconds, out of 12 classified finishers of his heat. This was not sufficient to advance him to the semi-finals.

Key

- Note–Ranks given for track events are within the athlete's heat only
- N/A = Round not applicable for the event

Track & road events

Athlete	Event	Heat		Semifinal		Final	
Athlete	Event	Result	Rank	Result	Rank	Result	Rank
James Chiengjiek	Men's 400 m	52.89	8	Did not advance			
Yiech Biel	Men's 800 m	1:54.67	8	Did not advance			
Paulo Lokoro	Men's 1500 m	4:03.96	11	Did not advance			
Yonas Kinde	Men's marathon	—N/a				2:24:08	90
Rose Lokonyen	Women's 800 m	2:16.64	7	Did not advance			
Anjelina Lohalith	Women's 1500 m	4:47.38	14	Did not advance			

== Judo ==
Two judokas were selected as part of the team, one male and one female. Both Popole Misenga and Yolande Mabika are originally from the Democratic Republic of Congo but have been training in Brazil. Misenga was 24 years old at the time of these Olympics. He competed in the men's middleweight competition, held on 10 August, and received a bye through the first round. In the second round, he beat Avtar Singh of India, and in the third round lost to eventual bronze medalist Gwak Dong-han of South Korea. Misenga was officially recorded as finishing in a tie for ninth place. Mabika was 28 years old at the time of the Rio Olympics. On 10 August, she lost in the first round of the women's −70 kg to Linda Bolder of Israel. She is recorded as finishing a joint 17th place.

Athlete	Event	Round of 64	Round of 32	Round of 16	Quarterfinals	Semifinals	Repechage	Final / BM	
Athlete	Event	Opposition Result	Opposition Result	Opposition Result	Opposition Result	Opposition Result	Opposition Result	Opposition Result	Rank
Popole Misenga	Men's −90 kg	Bye	Singh (IND); W 001–000	Gwak D-h (KOR); L 000–100	Did not advance				
Yolande Mabika	Women's −70 kg	—N/a	Bolder (ISR); L 000–110	Did not advance					

== Swimming ==
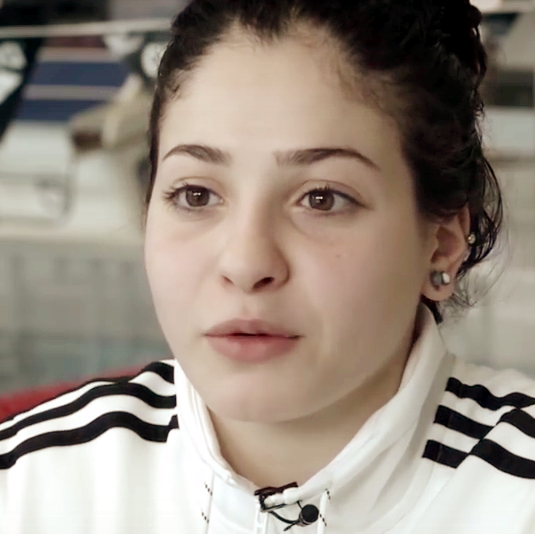
Yusra Mardini was one of two swimmers for the Refugee Team in Rio.

Two swimmers were selected for the team, one male and one female; Rami Anis, originally from Syria, and since then living in Belgium and Yusra Mardini, also originally from Syria, and living in Germany at the time. An assistant coach, Khamis Agear, is also from Syria. Anis was 25 years old at the time of the Rio Olympics. On 9 August, he took part in the men's 100 meters freestyle's first round, from where the top 16 swimmers proceeded to the semifinals. His time was 54.25 seconds, 6th of 8 swimmers in his heat and 56th of 59 overall competitors, so he was eliminated in the first round. On 11 August he competed in the men's 100 meters butterfly. In the first round, he swam a time of 56.23 seconds, last in his heat. As the top 16 could proceed to the semifinals, and he was ranked 40th overall, he was unable to advance.

Mardini was 18 years old at the time of the 2016 Olympics. On 6 August, she swam in the first round of the women's 100 meters butterfly and won her heat in a time of 1 minute and 9.21 seconds. However, only the top 16 overall were to advance to the semifinals, and her overall ranking was 40th. Next for her was the women's 100 meters freestyle on 10 August. She was 7th in her heat with a time of 1 minute and 4.66 seconds, and, as usual, the top 16 overall fastest times made the semifinals. Her overall placement with that time was 45th, so she was eliminated. Mardini and her sister Sara inspired the Netflix film The Swimmers.

Athlete	Event	Heat		Semifinal		Final	
Athlete	Event	Time	Rank	Time	Rank	Time	Rank
Rami Anis	Men's 100 m butterfly	56.23	40	Did not advance			
Rami Anis	Men's 100 m freestyle	54.25	56	Did not advance			
Yusra Mardini	Women's 100 m freestyle	1:04.66	45	Did not advance			
Yusra Mardini	Women's 100 m butterfly	1:09.21	41	Did not advance			

Qualifiers for the latter rounds of all events were decided on a time-only basis, therefore ranks shown are overall results versus competitors in all heats.

== See also ==
- Independent Paralympic Athletes at the 2016 Summer Paralympics
- IOC Refugee Olympic Team at the 2020 Summer Olympics
