= Szaundra Diedrich =

German judoka (born 1993)

Personal information
- Born: 18 May 1993 (age 33)
- Occupation: Judoka

Sport
- Country: Germany
- Sport: Judo
- Weight class: ‍–‍70 kg

Achievements and titles
- World Champ.: R32 (2015)
- European Champ.: (bronze) (2015)
Medal record
Women's judo
Representing Germany
European Games
| Silver medal – second place | 2015 Baku | Women's team |
| Bronze medal – third place | 2015 Baku | ‍–‍70 kg |
IJF Grand Slam
| Bronze medal – third place | 2015 Tyumen | ‍–‍70 kg |
| Bronze medal – third place | 2018 Düsseldorf | ‍–‍70 kg |
IJF Grand Prix
| Gold medal – first place | 2015 Tbilisi | ‍–‍70 kg |
| Silver medal – second place | 2015 Düsseldorf | ‍–‍70 kg |
| Silver medal – second place | 2015 Budapest | ‍–‍70 kg |
| Bronze medal – third place | 2014 Astana | ‍–‍70 kg |
| Bronze medal – third place | 2018 Agadir | ‍–‍70 kg |
World Juniors Championships
| Bronze medal – third place | 2013 Ljubljana | ‍–‍70 kg |
European Junior Championships
| Bronze medal – third place | 2012 Poreč | ‍–‍70 kg |

Profile at external databases
- IJF: 3647
- JudoInside.com: 56674
- Updated on 14 November 2022

Szaundra Diedrich (born 18 May 1993) is a German judoka.

Diedrich is the gold medalist from the 2015 Judo Grand Prix Tbilisi in the ‍–‍70 kg category.
