= Fanny Estelle Posvite =

French judoka (born 1992)

Personal information
- Nationality: French
- Born: 27 May 1992 (age 34)
- Occupation: Judoka

Sport
- Country: France
- Sport: Judo
- Weight class: ‍–‍70 kg, ‍–‍78 kg

Achievements and titles
- World Champ.: (bronze) (2015)
- European Champ.: (bronze) (2016, 2021, 2025)
Medal record
Women's judo
Representing France
World Championships
Bronze medal – third place	2015 Astana	‍–‍70 kg
European Championships
Bronze medal – third place	2016 Kazan	‍–‍70 kg
Bronze medal – third place	2021 Lisbon	‍–‍78 kg
Bronze medal – third place	2025 Podgorica	‍–‍78 kg
World Masters
Gold medal – first place	2019 Qingdao	‍–‍78 kg
Bronze medal – third place	2015 Rabat	‍–‍70 kg
Bronze medal – third place	2023 Budapest	‍–‍78 kg
IJF Grand Slam
Silver medal – second place	2014 Paris	‍–‍70 kg
Silver medal – second place	2020 Paris	‍–‍78 kg
Silver medal – second place	2020 Budapest	‍–‍78 kg
Silver medal – second place	2021 Tel Aviv	‍–‍78 kg
Silver medal – second place	2023 Abu Dhabi	‍–‍78 kg
Silver medal – second place	2024 Tashkent	‍–‍78 kg
Bronze medal – third place	2019 Osaka	‍–‍78 kg
Bronze medal – third place	2020 Düsseldorf	‍–‍78 kg
Bronze medal – third place	2023 Astana	‍–‍78 kg
Bronze medal – third place	2025 Paris	‍–‍78 kg
Bronze medal – third place	2025 Tbilisi	‍–‍78 kg
Bronze medal – third place	2026 Budapest	‍–‍78 kg
IJF Grand Prix
Gold medal – first place	2019 Hohhot	‍–‍78 kg
Silver medal – second place	2013 Rijeka	‍–‍70 kg
Silver medal – second place	2016 Tbilisi	‍–‍70 kg
Silver medal – second place	2016 Samsun	‍–‍70 kg
Silver medal – second place	2017 Zagreb	‍–‍70 kg
Silver medal – second place	2019 Zagreb	‍–‍78 kg
Silver medal – second place	2026 Lima	‍–‍78 kg
Bronze medal – third place	2012 Abu Dhabi	‍–‍70 kg
Bronze medal – third place	2013 Samsun	‍–‍70 kg
Bronze medal – third place	2014 Budapest	‍–‍70 kg
Bronze medal – third place	2015 Zagreb	‍–‍70 kg
Bronze medal – third place	2019 Tbilisi	‍–‍78 kg
World University Games
Bronze medal – third place	2013 Kazan	‍–‍70 kg
Bronze medal – third place	2013 Kazan	Women's team

Profile at external databases
- IJF: 4537
- JudoInside.com: 51699
- Updated on 13 September 2026

Fanny Estelle Posvite (born 27 May 1992) is a French judoka.

Posvite won a bronze medal at the 2015 World Judo Championships in Astana.
