= Rose Lokonyen =

South Sudanese-born track and field athlete

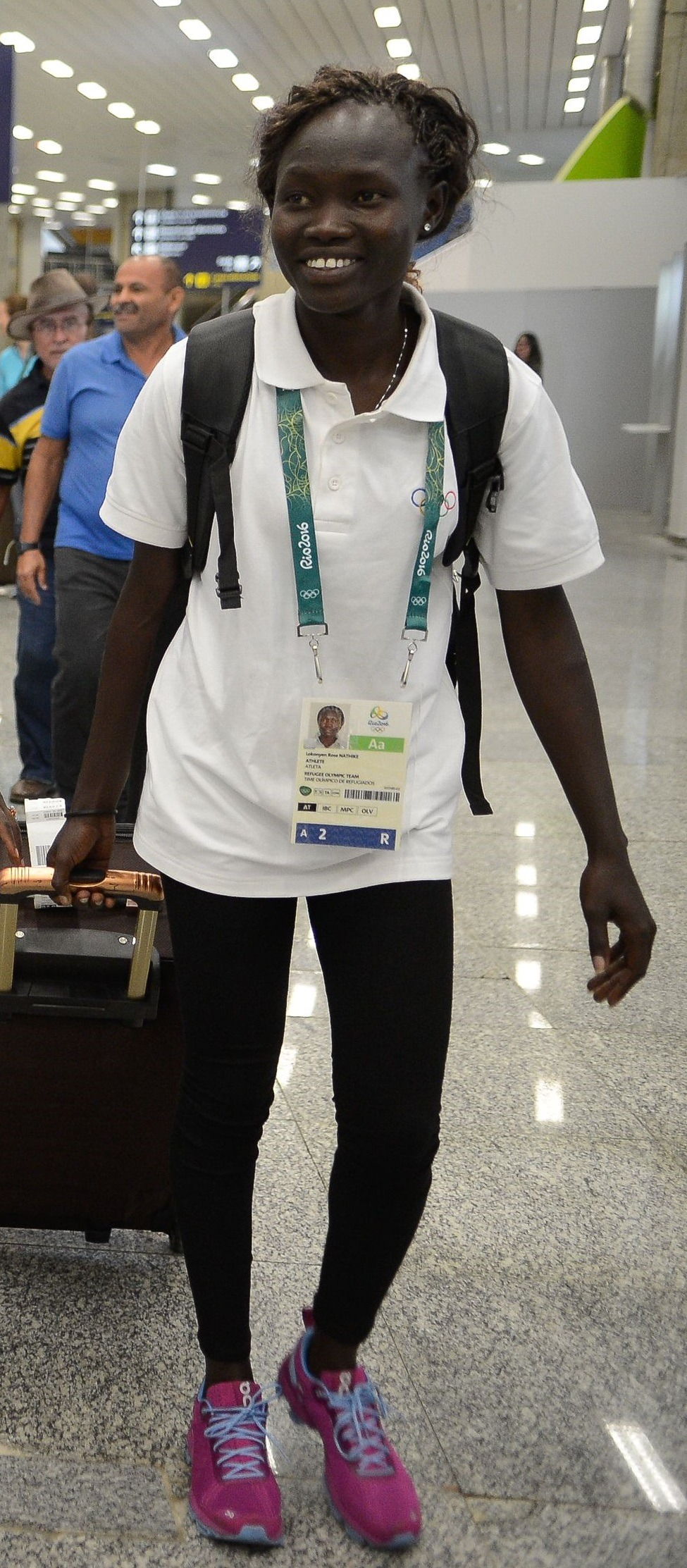
- Lokonyen arriving in Rio de Janeiro for the 2016 Summer Olympics

Personal information
- National team: Refugee Olympic Team
- Born: 24 February 1995 (age 31) near Chukudum, Sudan (now South Sudan)
- Height: 1.57 m (5 ft 2 in)
- Weight: 50 kg (110 lb)

Sport
- Country: South Sudan
- Event: 800 meters
- Coached by: Tegla Loroupe
- Updated on 16 August 2016

Rose Nathike Lokonyen (born 24 February 1995) is a track and field athlete from South Sudan, who has later lived and trained in Kenya.

== Early life ==
Lokonyen was born in South Sudan. Her father is a soldier and she has four younger siblings. When she was 10, Lokonyen and her family fled on foot from soldiers in their village of Chukudum. The family then crowded into the back of a truck and made their way to Kakuma refugee camp in northwest Kenya. Her parents left Kakuma in 2008 but left Lokonyen and her siblings at the refugee camp. When she reached high school, while still living in the refugee camp, Lokonyen began running as a pastime.

== Career ==
The International Olympic Committee and Tegla Loroupe Foundation held races inside refugee camps as tryouts for possible participation in the 2016 Summer Olympics. Lokonyen first tried out, while running barefoot, at the 5,000 meter distance and won her race, allowing her to advance to Ngong. She continued to train alongside other Olympic hopeful refugees in Ngong before being notified via a livestream from Geneva, Switzerland that she had been chosen to compete. She was coached by John Anzrah.

She was selected by the International Olympic Committee (IOC) to compete for the Refugee Olympic Team in the women's 800 m at the 2016 Summer Olympics in Rio de Janeiro, Brazil. The Refugee Olympic Team was the first in Olympic history. Lokonyen was one of five athletes on the refugee team born in South Sudan and was the team's flag bearer at the opening ceremony. Nathinke finished seventh in her first round heat with a time of 2:16.64. She did not advance. She also competed in the 2020 Tokyo olympics.

She trains with Tegla Loroupe, a Kenyan world record holding long-distance runner.

== Competitions ==
Year	Competition	Venue	Position	Event	Notes
Representing Refugee Athletes
2016	Summer Olympics	Rio de Janeiro, Brazil	7th (h)	800 m	2:16.64
2017	World Championships	London, United Kingdom	8th (h)	800 m	2:20.06
2019	IAAF World Relays	Yokohama, Japan	7th	Mixed 2×2×400 m relay	4:08.80
2019	World Championships	Doha, Qatar	7th (h)	800 m	2:13.39
2021	Summer Olympics	Tokyo, Japan	8th (h)	800 m	2:11.87

Olympic Games
Preceded by First	Flagbearer for Refugee Olympic Team; Rio de Janeiro 2016	Succeeded by Yusra Mardini & Tachlowini Gabriyesos
