= Velserbroek =

- Town
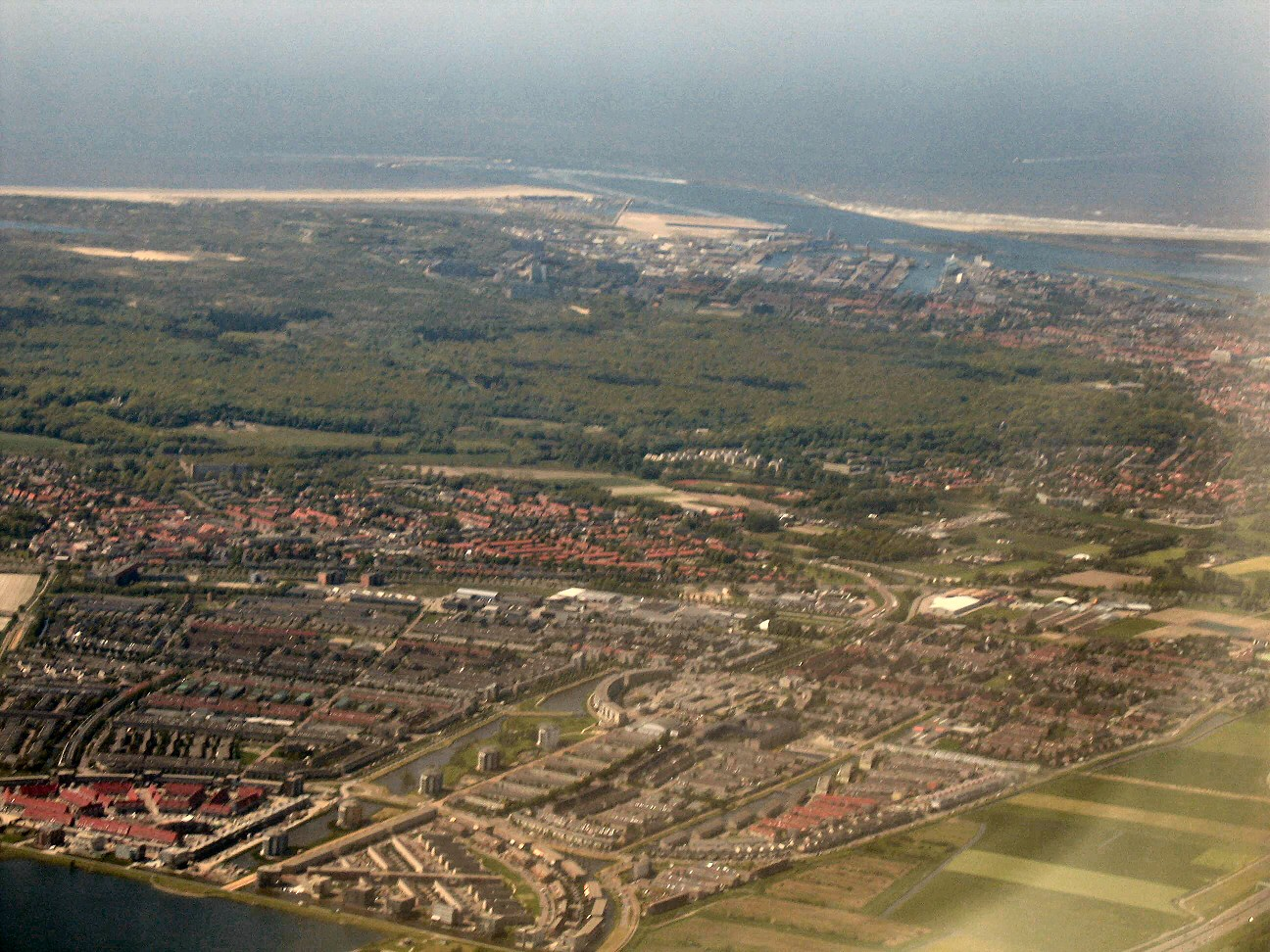
- Aerial view of Velserbroek

- Location in the Netherlands Location in the province of North Holland in the Netherlands
- Coordinates: 52°26′6″N 4°39′26″E
- Country: Netherlands
- Province: North Holland
- Municipality: Velsen

Area
  - Total: 3.95 km^{2} (1.53 sq mi)
- Elevation: 2.2 m (7.2 ft)

Population (2021)
  - Total: 15,185
  - Density: 3,840/km^{2} (9,960/sq mi)
- Time zone: UTC+1 (CET)
  - Summer (DST): UTC+2 (CEST)
- Postal code: 1991
- Dialing code: 023

Velserbroek is a town in the Dutch province of North Holland. It is a part of the municipality of Velsen.

Velserbroek is planned town for the Velsen region and was developed from 1985 onwards.

== Notable residents ==
- Linda Bolder (born 1988), Israeli-Dutch Olympic judoka
