= Yusra Mardini =

Syrian competition swimmer (born 1998)

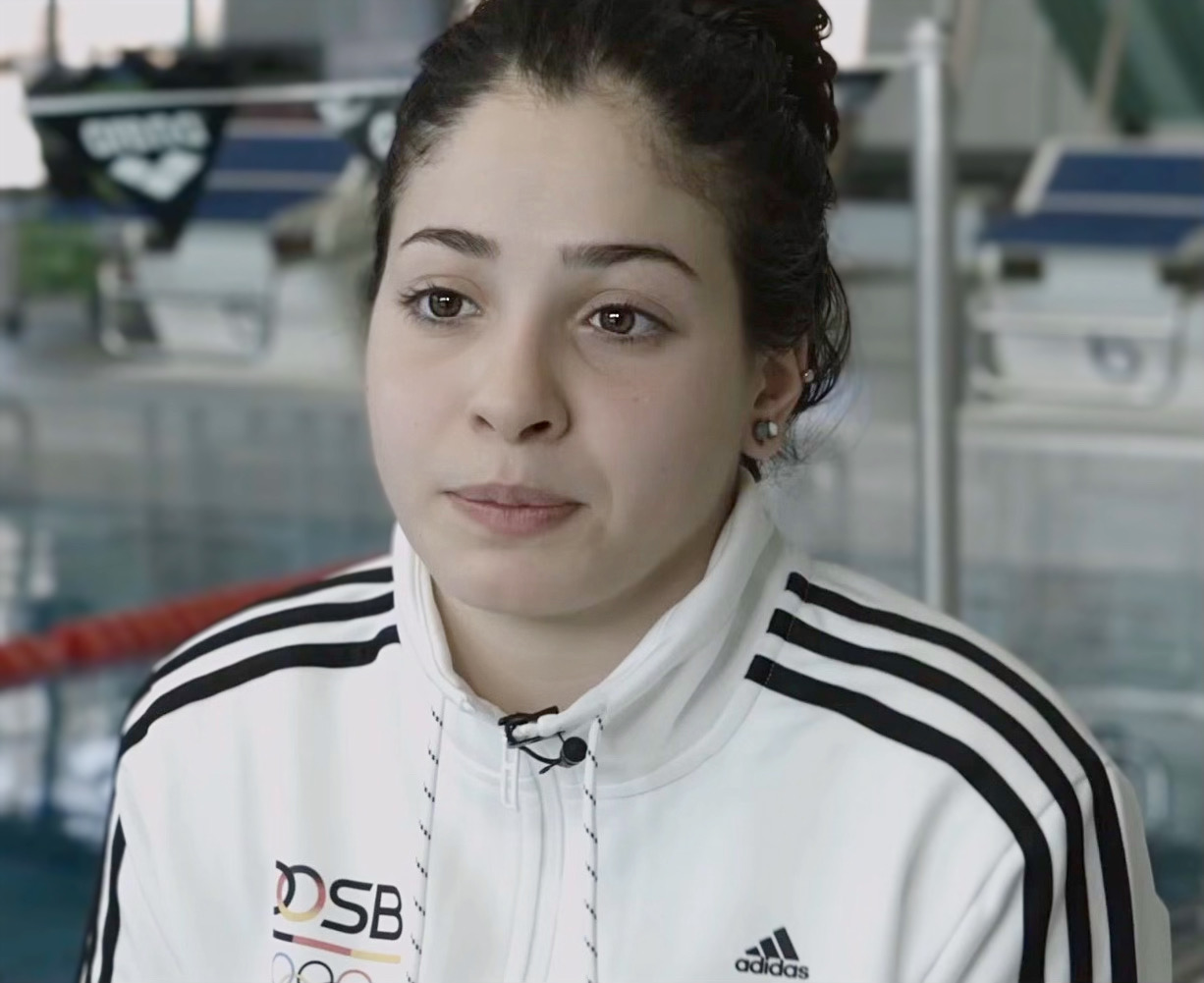
- Yusra Mardini in 2016

Personal information
- Native name: يسرى مارديني
- Born: Yusra Mardini; 5 March 1998 (age 28) Darayya, Damascus, Syria
- Occupation: competition swimmer
- Years active: 2012–2022
- Height: 1.68 m (5 ft 6 in)

Sport
- Country: Syria
- Sport: Freestyle swimming, Butterfly stroke
- Coached by: Sven Spannekrebs and Radwan Obeidat

Achievements and titles
- Olympic finals: member of Refugee Olympic Team 2016 and 2020

Yusra Mardini (Arabic: يسرى مارديني; born 5 March 1998) is a Syrian former competition swimmer and refugee of the Syrian civil war. She was a member of the first ever Refugee Olympic Athletes Team (ROT) that competed under the Olympic flag at the 2016 Summer Olympics in Rio de Janeiro. On 27 April 2017, Mardini was appointed a UNHCR Goodwill Ambassador. She also competed in the 2020 Summer Olympics in Tokyo with the Refugee Olympic Team (EOR). She was named one of the 100 most influential people in the world by Time magazine in 2023, alongside her sister, Sarah.

== Early life ==
Mardini was born to a Sunni Syrian family. Her parents were Ezzat Mardini (also referred to as Mohamed Ezzat Mardini) and Mervat Mardini. Growing up in Damascus, Syria, Mardini trained in swimming with the support of the Syrian Olympic Committee. In 2012, she represented Syria in the 2012 FINA World Swimming Championships (25 m) 200 metre individual medley, 200 metre freestyle and 400 metre freestyle events.

Mardini's house was destroyed in the Syrian Civil War. Mardini and her sister Sarah decided to flee Syria in August 2015. They reached Lebanon, and then Turkey, where they arranged to be smuggled into Greece by boat with 18 other migrants, though the boat was meant to be used by no more than 6 or 7 people. After the motor stopped working and the dinghy began to take on water in the Aegean Sea, Yusra, Sarah, and two other people who were able to swim jumped into the water and pushed and pulled the boat through the water for over 3 hours until the group reached the island of Lesbos. They then traveled on foot through Europe to Germany, where they settled in Berlin in September 2015. Her parents and younger sister, Shahed, also fled Syria and live in Germany.

== Swimming career ==
On arrival in Germany, Mardini continued her training with her coach Sven Spannekrebs from Wasserfreunde Spandau 04 in Berlin, in hopes of qualifying for the Olympics. She attempted to qualify in the 200 metres freestyle swimming event, and in June 2016, Mardini was one of ten athletes selected for the newly formed Refugee Olympic Team. Mardini competed in the 100 metres freestyle and the 100 metres butterfly at the 2016 Summer Olympics in Rio. She won a 100m butterfly heat against four other swimmers, with a time of 1:09.21 and a rank of 41st among 45 entrants, but did not qualify for the semi-finals.

International Olympic Committee (IOC) President Thomas Bach said of the refugee athletes, "We help them to make their dream of sporting excellence come true, even when they have to flee war and violence."

Mardini also competed at the 2020 Summer Olympic Games in Tokyo. She carried the flag of the IOC Refugee Olympic Team in the athletes’ parade of the opening ceremony. In the women's 100m butterfly, she swam a time of 1:06.78 in the heats, and was eliminated from the next rounds for which only the top 16 women qualified.

"After the Olympics, I realised that it’s not just my story anymore. I realised that my responsibility is to raise awareness and bring hope to millions of refugees around the world and speak for all of those who do not have a voice".

— Yusra Mardini,

After her decision to end her swimming career, Mardini moved to Los Angeles in 2022 to study film and television production at the University of Southern California. In early 2025, Yusra returned to Syria after about 10 years in exile. She visited her old training pool near Damascus and reflected on her journey from refugee to Olympian.

== Other activities ==
In May 2017, Mardini became the youngest-ever Goodwill Ambassador for the United Nations High Commissioner for Refugees (UNHCR). Since then, she has met and encouraged refugees, for example, in Zaatari camp, Jordan, in Kenya and following the 2023 earthquakes in Turkey and Syria. She has spoken at numerous high-level advocacy meetings, including Google Zeitgeist, the World Economic Forum, United Nations Climate Change Conference, and the Global Women's Forum, as well as in schools. At the 2024 Olympic Games in Paris, Mardini was hired by Eurosport and Discovery TV channels to report on the Refugee Olympic Team.

On 20 June 2023, on UN World Refugee Day, she officially started the Yusra Mardini Foundation to support sports and education for refugee communities. The Foundation is based both in the US and Germany, consisting of a small team that has been working with refugees before.

In October 2017, Mardini joined a team of international athletes to represent the Under Armour sports brand. Presenting international fashion brands, she was pictured in January 2023 on the cover of Harper's Bazaar Arabia and modelling at Milan Fashion Week in September of the same year. During the 2025 Milan Fashion Week, she appeared wearing creations by Max Mara, Prada and Hugo Boss.

== In popular culture ==
Mardini's story is told in the short story collection Good Night Stories for Rebel Girls, by Elena Favilli and Francesca Cavallo. The story is illustrated by JM Cooper, and when the story was released as a podcast episode (in March 2018) it was narrated by American journalist and long-distance swimmer Diana Nyad.

On 3 May 2018, her autobiography Butterfly: From Refugee to Olympian - My Story of Rescue, Hope, and Triumph was published.

Irish musician Declan O'Rourke penned the song "Olympian" to recall Yusra's story. It was released in 2021.

In November 2022, a biographical film, inspired by Mardini's life and titled The Swimmers, was theatrically released and distributed on Netflix later the same month. The film stars Manal Issa, Nathalie Issa, and Ahmed Malek.

Olympic Games
Preceded by Rose Lokonyen	Flagbearer for Refugee Olympic Team (with Tachlowini Gabriyesos); Tokyo 2020	Succeeded by Yahya Al Ghotany e Cindy Ngamba
