= Lior Wildikan =

Israeli judoka (born 1989)

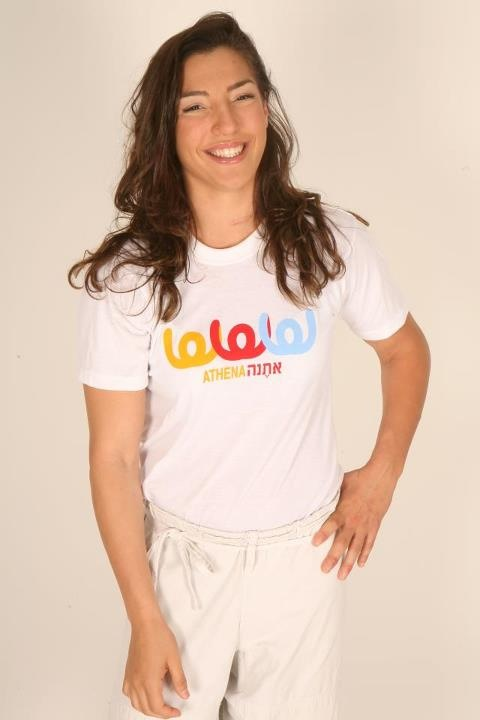

Personal information
- Native name: ליאור וילדיקן
- Born: 21 July 1989 (age 36)
- Occupation: Judoka

Sport
- Country: Israel
- Sport: Judo
- Weight class: ‍–‍70 kg

Achievements and titles
- World Champ.: 7th (2015)
- European Champ.: R16 (2013, 2014, 2015, 2016)
Medal record
Women's judo
Representing Israel
IJF Grand Prix
Silver medal – second place	2013 Almaty	‍–‍70 kg
Bronze medal – third place	2013 Tashkent	‍–‍70 kg
Bronze medal – third place	2014 Tbilisi	‍–‍70 kg
Bronze medal – third place	2014 Jeju	‍–‍70 kg

Profile at external databases
- IJF: 2440
- JudoInside.com: 39470
- Updated on 3 February 2022

Lior Wildikan (Hebrew: ליאור וילדיקן; born 21 July 1989) is an Israeli judoka.

Wildikan won the silver medal at the 2013 Almaty Grand Prix and placed 7th at the 2015 World Championships.
