= Judo at the 2016 Summer Olympics – Women's 70 kg =

Women's 70 kg at the Games of the XXXI Olympiad
- Venue: Carioca Arena 2
- Date: 10 August 2016
- Competitors: 24 from 24 nations

Medalists
1st place, gold medalist(s)		Haruka Tachimoto	Japan
2nd place, silver medalist(s)		Yuri Alvear	Colombia
3rd place, bronze medalist(s)		Sally Conway	Great Britain
3rd place, bronze medalist(s)		Laura Vargas Koch	Germany

The women's 70 kg competition in judo at the 2016 Summer Olympics in Rio de Janeiro was held on 10 August at the Carioca Arena 2.

The gold and silver medals were determined by a single-elimination tournament, with the winner of the final taking gold and the loser receiving silver. Judo events awarded two bronze medals. Quarterfinal losers competed in a repechage match for the right to face a semifinal loser for a bronze medal (that is, the judokas defeated in quarterfinals A and B competed against each other, with the winner of that match facing the semifinal loser from the other half of the bracket).

The medals were presented by Sari Essayah, IOC member from Finland, and the gifts were presented by Lassana Paleinfo, vice president of the International Judo Federation.

== Results ==
=== Finals ===
Semi-finals
Haruka Tachimoto (JPN)	010
Laura Vargas Koch (GER)	000
Yuri Alvear (COL)	010
Sally Conway (GBR)	000

Final
Haruka Tachimoto (JPN)	100
Yuri Alvear (COL)	000

=== Repechages ===
Repechage		Bronze medal
Kelita Zupancic (CAN)	001
Bernadette Graf (AUT)	010	Bernadette Graf (AUT)	000
		Sally Conway (GBR)	001

Repechage		Bronze medal
María Bernabéu (ESP)	000
Linda Bolder (ISR)	000	María Bernabéu (ESP)	000
		Laura Vargas Koch (GER)	010

=== Pool A ===
First round
Zhou Chao (CHN)	000
Haruka Tachimoto (JPN)	100
Esther Stam (GEO)	011
Tsend-Ayuushiin Naranjargal (MGL)	000

Second round
Kim Polling (NED)	001
Haruka Tachimoto (JPN)	002
Kelita Zupancic (CAN)	000
Esther Stam (GEO)	000

Quarterfinals
Haruka Tachimoto (JPN)	010
Kelita Zupancic (CAN)	000

=== Pool B ===
First round
Assmaa Niang (MAR)	000
Maria Portela (BRA)	001
Elvismar Rodríguez (VEN)	000
Antónia Moreira (ANG)	100

Second round
Bernadette Graf (AUT)	000
Maria Portela (BRA)	000
Laura Vargas Koch (GER)	000
Antónia Moreira (ANG)	000

Quarterfinals
Bernadette Graf (AUT)	000
Laura Vargas Koch (GER)	100

=== Pool C ===
First round
Barbara Matić (CRO)	000
María Pérez (PUR)	011
Gulnoza Matniyazova (UZB)	000
Katarzyna Kłys (POL)	000

Second round
Yuri Alvear (COL)	000
María Pérez (PUR)	000
María Bernabéu (ESP)	000
Katarzyna Kłys (POL)	000

Quarterfinals
Yuri Alvear (COL)	100
María Bernabéu (ESP)	000

=== Pool D ===
First round
Sally Conway (GBR)	100
Houda Miled (TUN)	000
Yolande Mabika (ROT)	000
Linda Bolder (ISR)	110

Second round
Gévrise Émane (FRA)	001
Sally Conway (GBR)	100
Kim Seong-yeon (KOR)	000
Linda Bolder (ISR)	010

Quarterfinals
Sally Conway (GBR)	100
Linda Bolder (ISR)	000
