= Swimming at the 2016 Summer Olympics – Women's 100 metre butterfly =

Women's 100 metre butterfly at the Games of the XXXI Olympiad
- Venue: Olympic Aquatics Stadium
- Dates: 6 August 2016 (heats & semifinals); 7 August 2016 (final)
- Competitors: 45 from 35 nations
- Winning time: 55.48 WR

Medalists
1st place, gold medalist(s)		Sarah Sjöström	Sweden
2nd place, silver medalist(s)		Penny Oleksiak	Canada
3rd place, bronze medalist(s)		Dana Vollmer	United States

The women's 100 metre butterfly event at the 2016 Summer Olympics took place on 6–7 August at the Olympic Aquatics Stadium.

== Summary ==
Swedish swimmer Sarah Sjöström overturned her own existing world record to become the country's first Olympic champion in the pool since Lars Frölander topped the podium on the male counterpart of this event in 2000. She maintained an enormous lead from the start to capture her first Olympic gold medal with a 55.48, shaving 0.16 seconds off from her own world record. Canada's 16-year-old Penny Oleksiak came from third at the initial length to smash a new junior World and Canadian record for the silver in 56.46, touching out U.S. swimmer and reigning Olympic titleholder Dana Vollmer, who claimed the bronze in 56.63, by just 0.17 of a second.

Chinese teammates Chen Xinyi (56.72) and London 2012 runner-up Lu Ying (56.76) picked up the fourth and fifth spots respectively, separated by 0.04-second margin. Meanwhile, teenager Rikako Ikee cracked a 57-second barrier with a Japanese record and a sixth-place finish in 56.86. Australia's Emma McKeon (57.05) and Denmark's four-time Olympian Jeanette Ottesen (57.17) rounded out the championship field. In December 2016, Chen Xinyi was disqualified after failing a drugs test.

Earlier in the semifinals, Sjöström established a new Olympic record time of 55.84 to take the top seed for a historic finale, slicing 0.14 seconds off from the standard held by Vollmer at the previous Games.

The medals for the competition were presented by Gunilla Lindberg, Sweden, IOC member, and the gifts were presented by Mr. Pipat Paniangvait, Honorary Treasurer of the FINA.

== Records ==
Prior to this competition, the existing world and Olympic records were as follows:

World record	Sarah Sjöström (SWE)	55.64	Kazan, Russia	3 August 2015
Olympic record	Dana Vollmer (USA)	55.98	London, United Kingdom	29 July 2012

The following records were established during the competition:

Date	Event	Name	Nationality	Time	Record
6 August	Semifinal 2	Sarah Sjöström	Sweden	55.84	OR
7 August	Final	Sarah Sjöström	Sweden	55.48	WR

== Competition format ==
The competition consisted of three rounds: heats, semifinals, and a final. The swimmers with the best 16 times in the heats advanced to the semifinals. The swimmers with the best 8 times in the semifinals advanced to the final. Swim-offs were used as necessary to break ties for advancement to the next round.

== Results ==
=== Heats ===
Rank	Heat	Lane	Name	Nationality	Time	Notes
1	6	4	Sarah Sjöström	Sweden	56.26	Q
2	4	5	Dana Vollmer	United States	56.56	Q
3	6	3	Penny Oleksiak	Canada	56.73	Q, WJ, NR
4	5	4	Kelsi Dahlia	United States	56.97	Q
5	6	6	Lu Ying	China	57.08	Q
6	6	5	Jeanette Ottesen	Denmark	57.15	Q
7	4	4	Chen Xinyi	China	57.17	Q
8	6	2	Rikako Ikee	Japan	57.27	Q, NR
9	5	5	Emma McKeon	Australia	57.33	Q
10	4	6	Liliána Szilágyi	Hungary	57.70	Q
11	5	2	An Se-hyeon	South Korea	57.80	Q
12	4	7	Farida Osman	Egypt	57.83	Q, AF
13	4	8	Kimberly Buys	Belgium	57.91	Q
14	3	5	Daynara de Paula	Brazil	57.92	Q
15	3	3	Natsumi Hoshi	Japan	58.15	Q
15	5	7	Daiene Dias	Brazil	58.15	Q
17	4	3	Madeline Groves	Australia	58.17	
18	4	1	Anna Ntountounaki	Greece	58.27	
18	5	3	Noemie Thomas	Canada	58.27	
20	6	7	Svetlana Chimrova	Russia	58.41	
21	5	6	Ilaria Bianchi	Italy	58.48	
22	4	2	Alexandra Wenk	Germany	58.49	
23	6	8	Kristel Vourna	Greece	58.89	
24	5	8	Marie Wattel	France	58.90	
25	3	6	Béryl Gastaldello	France	58.93	
26	6	1	Nataliya Lovtsova	Russia	59.19	
27	2	4	Amit Ivry	Israel	59.42	
28	3	7	Lucie Svěcená	Czech Republic	59.45	
28	3	8	Danielle Villars	Switzerland	59.45	
30	3	4	Katarína Listopadová	Slovakia	59.57	
31	3	1	Judit Ignacio	Spain	59.61	
32	5	1	Louise Hansson	Sweden	59.73	
33	3	2	Helena Gasson	New Zealand	59.82	
34	2	3	Darya Stepanyuk	Ukraine	1:00.81	
35	2	5	Quah Ting Wen	Singapore	1:00.88	
36	2	2	Amina Kajtaz	Bosnia and Herzegovina	1:01.67	
37	2	6	Marie Laura Meza	Costa Rica	1:02.01	
38	2	7	Sotiria Neofytou	Cyprus	1:02.91	
39	2	1	Jannah Sonnenschein	Mozambique	1:04.21	
40	2	8	Dalia Tórrez Zamora	Nicaragua	1:05.81	
41	1	4	Yusra Mardini	Refugee Olympic Team	1:09.21	
42	1	5	Oreoluwa Cherebin	Grenada	1:10.40	
43	1	6	Nooran Ba Matraf	Yemen	1:11.16	
44	1	3	Johanna Umurungi	Rwanda	1:11.92	
45	1	2	Nada Arkaji	Qatar	1:18.86	

=== Semifinals ===
==== Semifinal 1 ====
Rank	Lane	Name	Nationality	Time	Notes
1	6	Rikako Ikee	Japan	57.05	Q, NR
2	4	Dana Vollmer	United States	57.06	Q
3	3	Jeanette Ottesen	Denmark	57.47	Q
4	5	Kelsi Dahlia	United States	57.54	
5	7	Farida Osman	Egypt	58.26	
6	2	Liliána Szilágyi	Hungary	58.31	
7	8	Daiene Dias	Brazil	58.52	
8	1	Daynara de Paula	Brazil	58.65	

==== Semifinal 2 ====
Rank	Lane	Name	Nationality	Time	Notes
1	4	Sarah Sjöström	Sweden	55.84	Q, OR
2	2	Emma McKeon	Australia	56.81	Q
3	5	Penny Oleksiak	Canada	57.10	Q
4	3	Lu Ying	China	57.15	Q
5	6	Chen Xinyi	China	57.51	Q
6	7	An Se-hyeon	South Korea	57.95	
7	8	Natsumi Hoshi	Japan	58.03	
8	1	Kimberly Buys	Belgium	58.63	

=== Final ===
Rank	Lane	Name	Nationality	Time	Notes
1st place, gold medalist(s)	4	Sarah Sjöström	Sweden	55.48	WR
2nd place, silver medalist(s)	2	Penny Oleksiak	Canada	56.46	WJ, NR
3rd place, bronze medalist(s)	6	Dana Vollmer	United States	56.63	
4	7	Lu Ying	China	56.76	
5	3	Rikako Ikee	Japan	56.86	NR
6	5	Emma McKeon	Australia	57.05	
7	1	Jeanette Ottesen	Denmark	57.17	
^{[a]}	8	Chen Xinyi	China	~~56.72~~	DSQ

^{Chen} - On 10 December 2016, FINA confirmed that Chen, who had originally placed 4th, tested positive for unlawful substances at the Games. Her results were voided, and she was given a two year ban from competing.
