= Bernadette Graf =

Austrian judoka (born 1992)

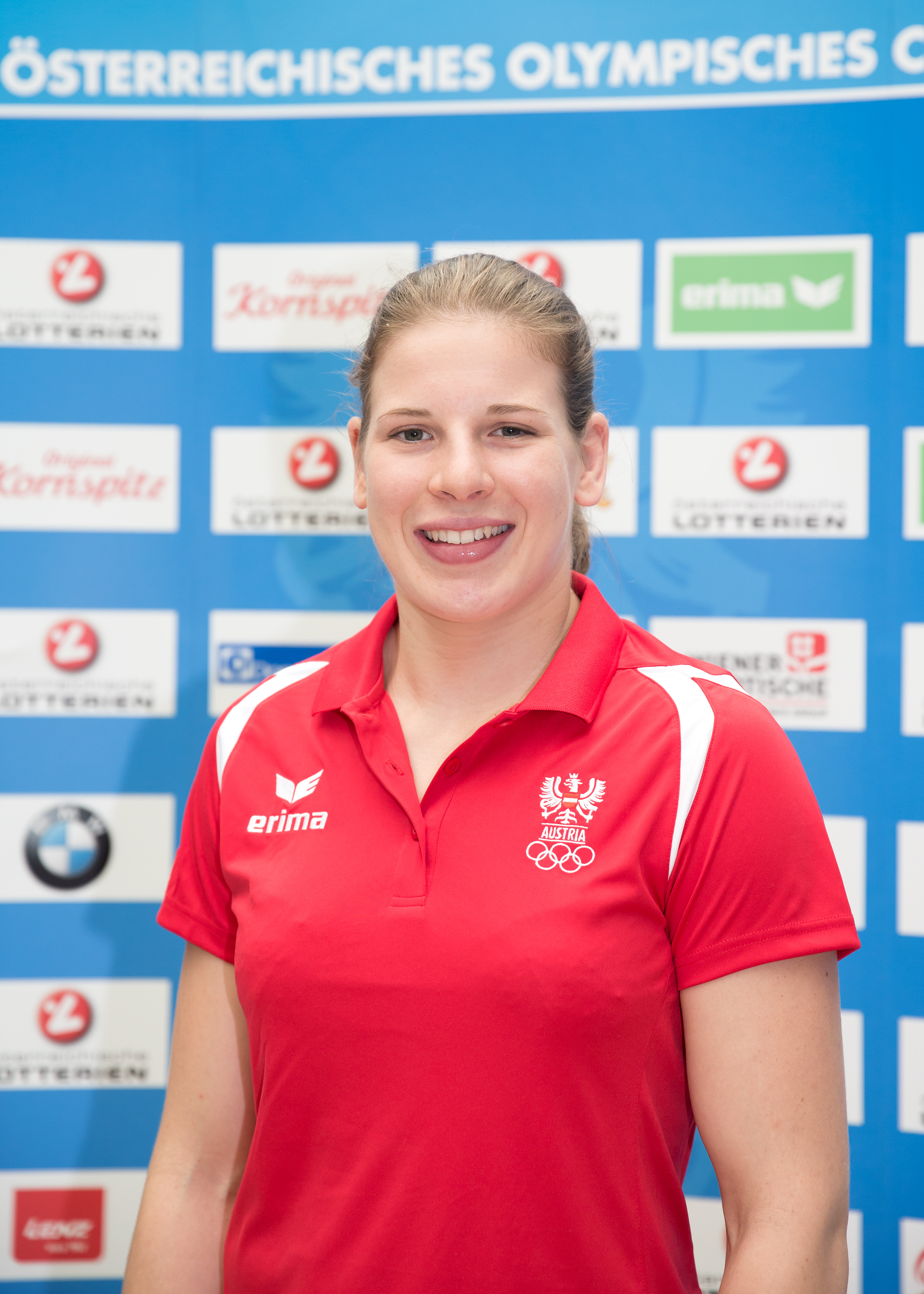
- Graf in 2016

Personal information
- Nationality: Austrian
- Born: 25 June 1992 (age 34)
- Occupation: Judoka
- Years active: 2013–2023
- Height: 1.75 m (5 ft 9 in)

Sport
- Country: Austria
- Sport: Judo
- Weight class: –70 kg, –78 kg
- Rank: 3rd dan black belt

Achievements and titles
- Olympic Games: 5th (2016)
- World Champ.: 5th (2015)
- European Champ.: (bronze) (2013, 2014, 2015, 2021)
Medal record
Women's judo
Representing Austria
European Games
Bronze medal – third place	2015 Baku	‍–‍70 kg
European Championships
Bronze medal – third place	2013 Budapest	‍–‍70 kg
Bronze medal – third place	2014 Montpellier	‍–‍70 kg
Bronze medal – third place	2021 Lisbon	‍–‍78 kg
World Masters
Silver medal – second place	2016 Guadalajara	‍–‍70 kg
IJF Grand Slam
Gold medal – first place	2013 Moscow	‍–‍70 kg
Silver medal – second place	2014 Abu Dhabi	‍–‍70 kg
Silver medal – second place	2022 Antalya	‍–‍70 kg
Bronze medal – third place	2015 Baku	‍–‍70 kg
Bronze medal – third place	2019 Düsseldorf	‍–‍78 kg
Bronze medal – third place	2019 Ekaterinburg	‍–‍78 kg
IJF Grand Prix
Gold medal – first place	2014 Astana	‍–‍70 kg
Gold medal – first place	2015 Ulaanbaatar	‍–‍70 kg
Gold medal – first place	2016 Düsseldorf	‍–‍70 kg
Gold medal – first place	2017 Hohhot	‍–‍78 kg
Gold medal – first place	2019 Tashkent	‍–‍78 kg
Silver medal – second place	2012 Abu Dhabi	‍–‍70 kg
Silver medal – second place	2014 Havana	‍–‍70 kg
Silver medal – second place	2014 Tashkent	‍–‍70 kg
Silver medal – second place	2018 Tashkent	‍–‍78 kg
Silver medal – second place	2020 Tel Aviv	‍–‍78 kg
Bronze medal – third place	2013 Samsun	‍–‍70 kg
Bronze medal – third place	2014 Qingdao	‍–‍70 kg
World Juniors Championships
Gold medal – first place	2011 Cape Town	‍–‍70 kg
European Junior Championships
Gold medal – first place	2011 Lommel	‍–‍70 kg
Bronze medal – third place	2009 Yerevan	‍–‍70 kg
European Cadet Championships
Bronze medal – third place	2008 Sarajevo	‍–‍70 kg

Profile at external databases
- IJF: 1681
- JudoInside.com: 49842
- Updated on 21 May 2023

Bernadette Graf (born 25 June 1992) is an Austrian judoka. Graf represented Austria at the 2016 and 2020 Summer Olympics.

In May 2023, Graf completed basic training with the Austrian police together with Sabrina Filzmoser and on May 17, 2023, Graf announced the end of her career on Instagram.
