= Rami Anis =

Syrian swimmer (born 1991)

Personal information
- Born: March 18, 1991 (age 35) Aleppo, Syria
- Height: 1.78 m (5 ft 10 in)
- Weight: 78 kg (172 lb)

Sport
- Country: (International Olympic Committee) Refugee Olympic Team
- Sport: Swimming

Rami Anis (born March 18, 1991) is a Syrian swimmer, who now resides in Belgium. He was one of 10 competitors representing the Refugee Olympic Team (ROT) under the Olympic flag, at the 2016 Summer Olympics in Rio de Janeiro. As war took hold of his home town Aleppo, Anis fled to Turkey then, by dinghy to Greece and on to Belgium.

== Biography ==
As bombings and kidnappings in Aleppo became more frequent in 2011, Anis had to leave the city. His family sent him to stay with his older brother in Istanbul, Turkey. In Istanbul he trained at Galatasaray Sports Club. In search of a chance to prove himself, Anis left Turkey aboard an inflatable dinghy and made his way across to the Greek island of Samos. Eventually he reached Belgium where he was granted asylum in December 2015. Today he trains at the Royal Ghent Swimming Club and is coached by Carine Verbauwen.
