= Olympic Refuge Foundation =

- Abbreviation: ORF
- Formation: September 2017
- Founders: International Olympic Committee
- Headquarters: Lausanne, Switzerland
- Region served: Worldwide
- Website: https://olympics.com/en/olympic-refuge-foundation/

The Olympic Refuge Foundation (ORF), is a non-governmental organization founded in September 2017 by the International Olympic Committee (IOC) and based in Lausanne, Switzerland. The primary stated goals of the foundation are to support the protection, development and thriving of displaced young people through sport, worldwide.

In March 2016, the IOC President Thomas Bach announced the creation of the Refugee Olympic Team, as "a symbol of hope for all refugees in the world" to "make the world better aware of the magnitude of this crisis". The Refugee Olympic Team competed for the first time at the 2016 Summer Olympics, under the Olympic Flag. In September 2017 the IOC launched the Olympic Refuge Foundation to continue the support to refugees in the long-term. The Foundation aims to provide access to safe sport for one million young people affected by displacement by 2024.

On 25 May 2022, the Olympic Refuge Foundation and the IOC Refugee Olympic Team were awarded with the 2022 Princess of Asturias Award for Sports.
