= Yonas Kinde =

Ethiopian long-distance runner

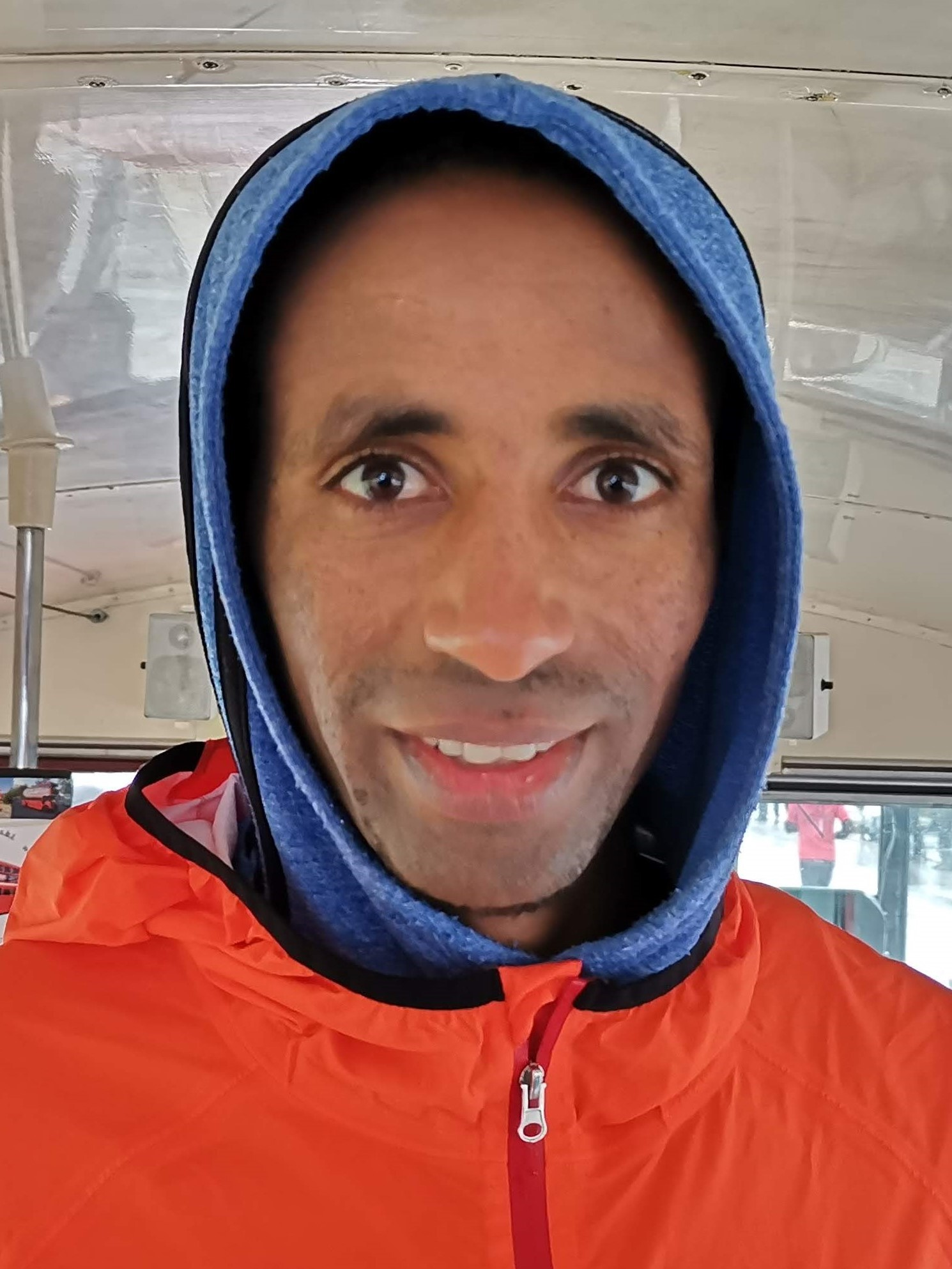
- Yonas Kinde

Personal information
- Nationality: Luxembourgish
- Born: 7 May 1980 (age 46) Gondar, Ethiopia
- Height: 73
- Weight: 60

Sport
- Sport: marathon, half marathon, 10km
- Club: Ciltic Diekrich

Achievements and titles
- Personal best: 2:17:12

Yonas Kinde (born 7 May 1980) is a track and field athlete originally from Ethiopia, but now living and training in Luxembourg. He was selected by the International Olympic Committee (IOC) to compete for the Refugee Olympic Team (ROT) at the 2016 Summer Olympics in Rio de Janeiro, Brazil. He is coached by Yves Göldi. Yonas ran his fastest marathon with a time of 2 hours 17 minutes.

== Personal life ==
Yonas is originally from Ethiopia. He has been living in Luxembourg since 2012 and obtained Luxembourgish nationality in 2020. Yonas speaks French, English, Luxembourgish, and Amharic; he works as a massage therapist.

== Athletics career ==
Yonas began running in Ethiopia as a teenager mainly in cross-country, 10,000m and half marathons, eventually moving up to the full marathon. During his relatively short running career in Europe, coached by Yves Göldi, he won several titles in Luxembourg, France and Germany. In Frankfurt, Germany he ran his personal best in 2015 in 2 hours and 17 minutes.

Due to his refugee status, Yonas could not compete at international competitions, despite being fast enough to have qualified. On 3 July 2016, the IOC announced that Yonas would be part of a team of ten athletes selected to compete as a Refugee Olympic Athletes team at the 2016 Summer Olympics in Rio de Janeiro, Brazil. He competed in the men's marathon.

== Competitions ==
Year	Competition	Venue	Position	Event	Notes
Representing Refugee Athletes
2016	Summer Olympics	Rio de Janeiro, Brazil	90th	Marathon	2:24:08

== Personal bests ==
- 1500 m – 3:56.56 in Kirchberg (LUX) on 18.02.2014
- 3000 m – 8:38.10 in Kirchberg (LUX) on 30.01.2016
- 5000 m – 14:32.69 in Schifflange (LUX) on 04.08.2013
- 8 km Road – 23:05 in Trier (GER) on 31.12.2013
- 10 km Road – 30:01 in Langsur (GER) on 09.11.2013
- Half marathon – 1:03:22 in Remich (LUX) on 28.09.2014
- Marathon – 2:17:31 in Frankfurt (GER) on 25.10.2015
- marathon-2:17:12 in Frankfurt (GER) on 31.10.2022

Half marathon 1:04:33 Ing Route du Vin (LUX) 25.09.2022
