= James Chiengjiek =

South Sudanese sprinter

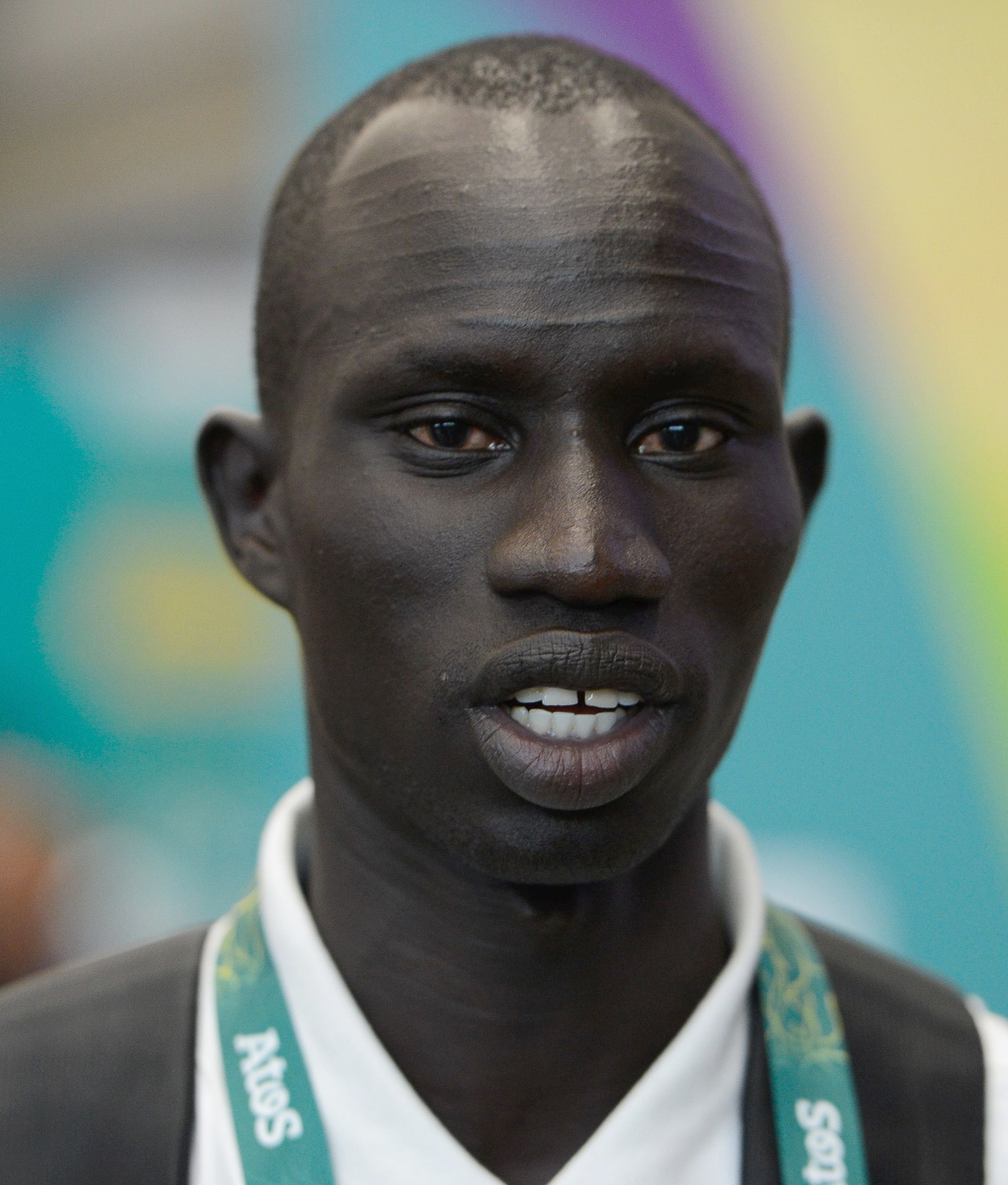
- Chiengjiek at the 2016 Olympics

Personal information
- Born: March 2, 1992 (age 34) Bentiu, Sudan (now South Sudan)
- Height: 1.79 m (5 ft 10 in)
- Weight: 59 kg (130 lb)

Sport
- Country: Refugee Olympic Team
- Sport: Track and field
- Event: 400 metres
- Club: Tegla Loroupe Foundation
- Coached by: Tegla Loroupe

Achievements and titles
- Personal best: 52.89 (2016)

James Nyang Chiengjiek (born March 2, 1992) is a runner originally from South Sudan, but now living and training in Kenya. He was selected by the International Olympic Committee (IOC) to compete for the Refugee Olympic Team (ROT) at the 2016 Summer Olympics. He placed last in his 400 m heat. He also qualified for the 2020 Tokyo Olympics ROT, and placed last in his 800 m heat after tripping due to a fellow competitor's involuntary touch.

== Personal life ==
Chiengjiek is originally from Bentiu, South Sudan. In 1999 his father, who was a soldier, was killed during the Second Sudanese Civil War. At the age of 13 Chiengjiek left South Sudan and escaped to Kenya as a refugee to avoid being recruited by rebels as a child soldier. In 2002 he ended up at the Kakuma refugee camp. The United Nations High Commissioner for Refugees (UNHCR) officially granted him refugee status in December 2014.

== Athletics career ==
He began running whilst attending school in Kenya; joining a group of older children from a town in the highlands known for its long-distance runners who were training for events. He often had to train without shoes, which resulted in his frequent injuries.

In 2013 he was selected to join a group of athletes in the Tegla Loroupe Peace Foundation, a support program for refugees from the Kakuma camp run by former marathon world record holder Tegla Loroupe. These athletes were identified by the IOC as having the potential to compete at the 2016 Summer Olympics.

On 3 June 2016 the IOC announced that Chiengjiek would be part of a team of ten athletes selected to compete for the Refugee Olympic Team at the 2016 Summer Olympics in Rio de Janeiro, Brazil.

Chiengjiek qualified for the IOC Refugee Olympic Team at the 2020 Summer Olympics in Tokyo and competed in the 800 m, placing last after being touched and falling.

== Competitions ==
Year	Competition	Venue	Position	Event	Notes
Representing Refugee Athletes
2016	Olympic Games	Rio de Janeiro, Brazil	50th (h)	400 m	52.89
2018	African Championships	Asaba, Nigeria	34th (h)	800 m	1:58.69
2019	World Relays	Yokohama, Japan	7th	Mixed 2×2×400 m relay	4:08.80
2021	Olympic Games	Tokyo, Japan	47th (h)	800 m	2:02.04
