= List of flag bearers for independent Olympians at the Olympics =

Independent Olympians at the Olympics
- IOC code: IOP, IOA, OAR, AIN
- Medals: Gold 0 Silver 0 Bronze 0 Total 0

Summer appearances
- Independent Olympic participants (1992); Individual Olympic athletes (2000); Independent Olympic athletes (2012); Independent Olympic athletes (2016)

Winter appearances
- Independent Olympic Participants (2014)

This is a list of flag bearers who have competed as individual Olympic athletes at the Olympics.

Flag bearers carry the Olympic Flag at the opening ceremony of the Olympic Games.

== List ==
Event year	Season	Flag bearer	Sport	Nationality (Note: The athlete's nationality is listed at the time of the competition.)	Notes
1992	Summer	none	—N/a		Athletes from Independent Olympic Participants at the 1992 Summer Olympics did not attend the parade of nations, but still competed at the Games.
2000	Summer	Victor Ramos	Boxing	East Timor	
2012	Summer	Brooklyn Kerlin (from LOCOG)	—N/a	United Kingdom not a competitor	
2014	Winter	Volunteer from SOCOG	—N/a	?	
2016	Summer	Rose Nathike Lokonyen	Distance running	South Sudan	Refugee Olympian Team; (United Nations) UNHCR identified refugees selected by the (International Olympic Committee) IOC. The flag bearer from South Sudan was certified by the (Kenya) Kenyan NOC.
2016	Summer	Volunteer from COJOPR	—N/a	?	Independent Olympian team; IOC allowed competitors separate from their nationalities. The Kuwaiti NOC was barred from participatnig in 2016. This left athletes to compete independently, along with other independents. The (Kuwait) Kuwaiti flag bearer Fehaid al-Deehani did not carry the Olympic Flag.
2018	Winter	Volunteer from POCOG	—N/a	?	
2020	Summer	Alia Issa		Syria	
2020	Summer	Volunteer from TOCOG			Refugee Olympian Team
2024	Summer	Yahya Al Ghotany	Taekwondo	Syria	
2024	Summer	Cindy Ngamba	Boxing	Cameroon	
2026	Winter	Cindy Ngamba	Boxing	Cameroon	

== See also ==
- Independent Olympians at the Olympic Games
