= Esther Stam =

Georgian judoka (born 1987)

Personal information
- Nationality: Georgian
- Born: 11 March 1987 (age 39) Zutphen, the Netherlands
- Occupation: Judoka

Sport
- Country: Georgia
- Sport: Judo
- Weight class: –63 kg, –70 kg

Achievements and titles
- Olympic Games: R16 (2016)
- World Champ.: R16 (2015)
- European Champ.: (silver) (2016)
Medal record
Women's judo
Representing Georgia
European Championships
Silver medal – second place	2016 Kazan	–70 kg
IJF Grand Prix
Silver medal – second place	2015 Tashkent	–70 kg
Silver medal – second place	2014 Astana	–70 kg
Bronze medal – third place	2014 Ulaanbaatar	–70 kg
Representing Netherlands
IJF Grand Prix
Bronze medal – third place	2011 Baku	–63 kg
European U23 Championships
Gold medal – first place	2007 Salzburg	–63 kg
European Cadet Championships
Gold medal – first place	2002 Győr	–63 kg
Gold medal – first place	2003 Baku	–63 kg
Summer Universiade
Gold medal – first place	2011 Shenzhen	–63 kg

Profile at external databases
- IJF: 16095, 3447
- JudoInside.com: 12155
- Updated on 17 February 2022

Esther Stam (born 11 March 1987) is a Georgian judoka.

== Life and career ==
Stam was born in Zutphen in the Netherlands on 11 March 1987.

She competed at the 2016 Summer Olympics in Rio de Janeiro, in the women's 70 kg.
