= Roxane Taeymans =

Belgian judoka (born 1991)

Personal information
- Born: 15 May 1991 (age 35)
- Occupation: Judoka

Sport
- Country: Belgium
- Sport: Judo
- Weight class: ‍–‍70 kg

Achievements and titles
- World Champ.: R16 (2017)
- European Champ.: R16 (2015)
Medal record
Women's judo
Representing Belgium
IJF Grand Prix
Silver medal – second place	2018 Tunis	‍–‍70 kg
Bronze medal – third place	2019 Perth	‍–‍70 kg
European U23 Championships
Gold medal – first place	2013 Samokov	‍–‍70 kg

Profile at external databases
- IJF: 3565
- JudoInside.com: 40489
- Updated on 5 December 2022

Roxane Taeymans (born 15 May 1991) is a Belgian former judoka.

Taeymans is the silver medalist from the 2018 Judo Grand Prix Tunis in the ‍–‍70 kg category.
