= Instituto Reação =

Non-governmental organization

Instituto Reação is a Brazilian non-governmental organization founded in 2003 by judo Olympic medalist Flávio Canto that promotes human development and social inclusion through sports and education, especially judo. Instituto Reação works in the favelas in Rio de Janeiro including Rocinha, Pequena Cruzada, Cidade de Deus and Tubiacanga. The Institute serves about 1,000 children and young people between 4 and 25 years old, and has played a prominent role in competitions, including having helped train the current Olympic and world junior judo champion, Rafaela Silva Lopes.

Instituto Reação was the first NGO to receive funding from UFC, the world's largest MMA event company.
