= Brás de Pina =

- Neighborhood
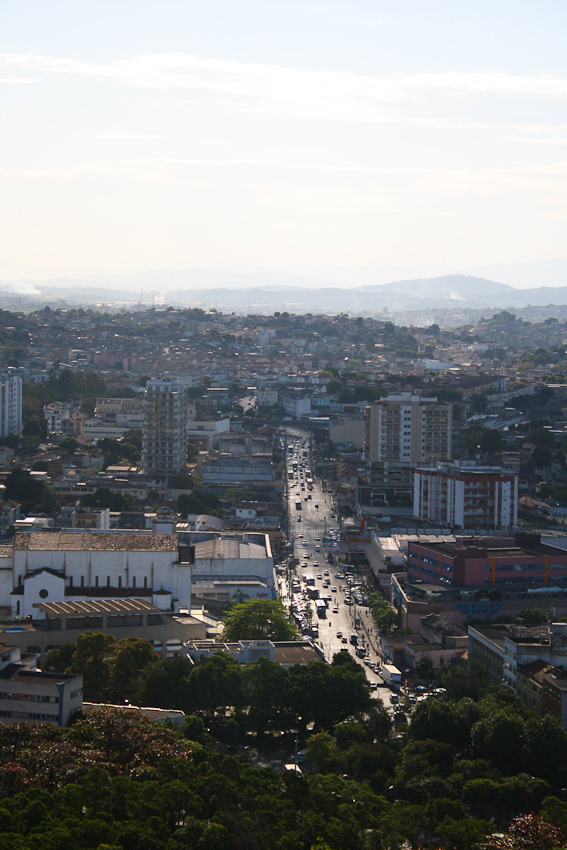

- Location in Rio de Janeiro Brás de Pina (Brazil)
- Coordinates: 22°49′45″S 43°17′56″W
- Country: Brazil
- State: Rio de Janeiro (RJ)
- Municipality/City: Rio de Janeiro
- Zone: North Zone

Population (2010)
  - Total: 59,222

Brás de Pina is a neighborhood in the North Zone of Rio de Janeiro, Brazil.
