= Laura Vargas Koch =

German judoka (born 1990)

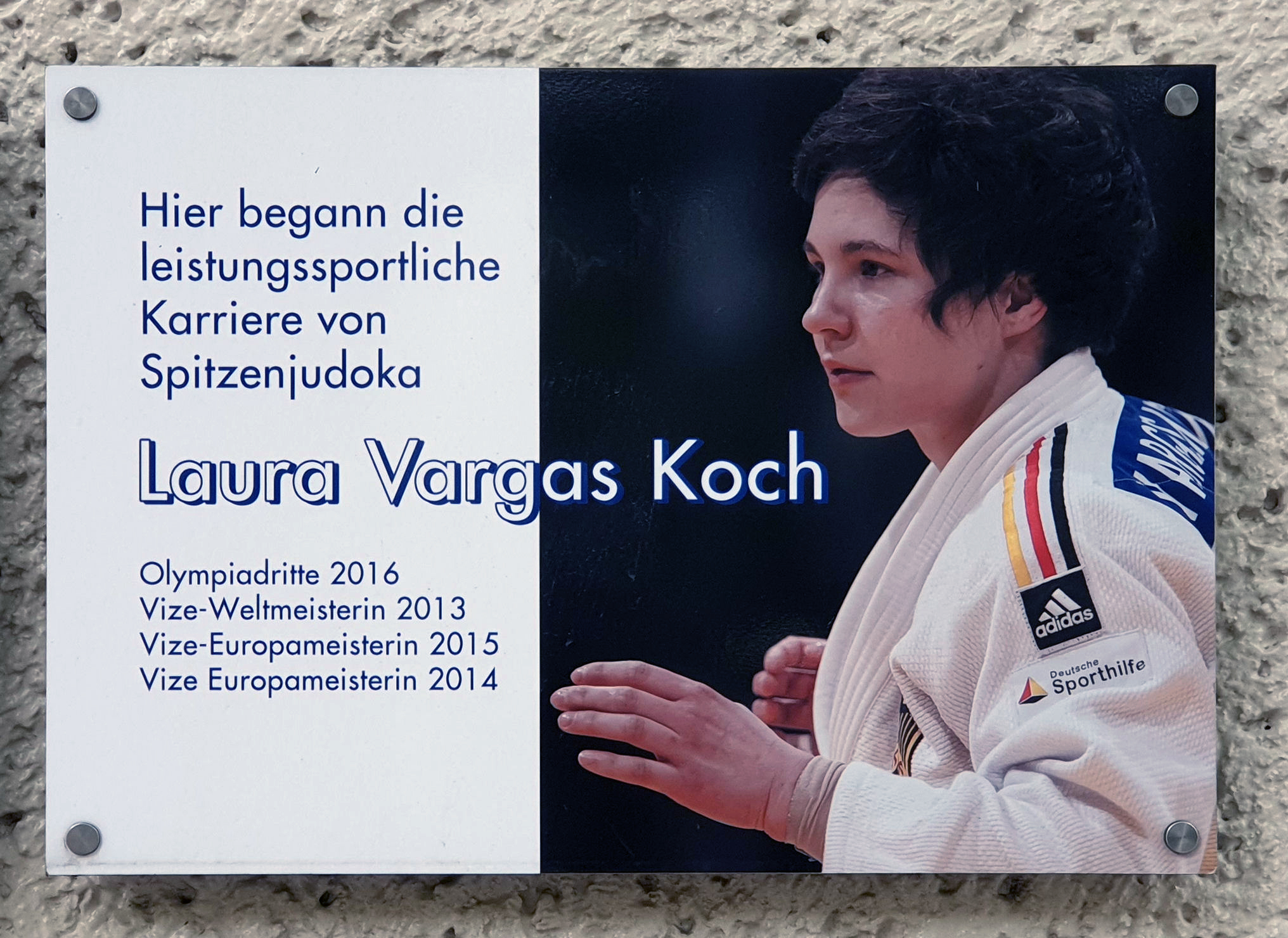

Personal information
- Nationality: German
- Born: 29 June 1990 (age 36)
- Occupation: Judoka
- Website: sites.google.com/view/lvargaskoch

Sport
- Country: Germany
- Sport: Judo
- Weight class: –70 kg

Achievements and titles
- Olympic Games: (bronze) (2016)
- World Champ.: (silver) (2013)
- European Champ.: (silver) (2014, 2015)
Medal record
Women's judo
Representing Germany
Olympic Games
Bronze medal – third place	2016 Rio de Janeiro	‍–‍70 kg
World Championships
Silver medal – second place	2013 Rio de Janeiro	‍–‍70 kg
Bronze medal – third place	2014 Chelyabinsk	Women's team
European Games
Silver medal – second place	2015 Baku	‍–‍70 kg
Silver medal – second place	2015 Baku	Women's team
European Championships
Gold medal – first place	2018 Yekaterinburg	Mixed team
Silver medal – second place	2014 Montpellier	‍–‍70 kg
Bronze medal – third place	2013 Budapest	‍–‍70 kg
Bronze medal – third place	2013 Budapest	Women's team
IJF Grand Slam
Gold medal – first place	2014 Abu Dhabi	‍–‍70 kg
Gold medal – first place	2015 Abu Dhabi	‍–‍70 kg
Silver medal – second place	2013 Baku	‍–‍70 kg
Silver medal – second place	2015 Paris	‍–‍70 kg
Bronze medal – third place	2013 Paris	‍–‍70 kg
Bronze medal – third place	2013 Moscow	‍–‍70 kg
Bronze medal – third place	2014 Tokyo	‍–‍70 kg
IJF Grand Prix
Gold medal – first place	2013 Rijeka	‍–‍70 kg
Gold medal – first place	2014 Samsun	‍–‍70 kg
Gold medal – first place	2014 Havana	‍–‍70 kg
Gold medal – first place	2014 Tashkent	‍–‍70 kg
Silver medal – second place	2013 Düsseldorf	‍–‍70 kg
Silver medal – second place	2014 Jeju	‍–‍70 kg
Silver medal – second place	2016 Budapest	‍–‍70 kg
Silver medal – second place	2019 Tbilisi	‍–‍70 kg
Bronze medal – third place	2012 Qingdao	‍–‍70 kg
Bronze medal – third place	2014 Astana	‍–‍70 kg
Bronze medal – third place	2015 Budapest	‍–‍70 kg
Bronze medal – third place	2015 Jeju	‍–‍70 kg
Bronze medal – third place	2016 Düsseldorf	‍–‍70 kg
Bronze medal – third place	2017 The Hague	‍–‍70 kg
Bronze medal – third place	2019 Marrakesh	‍–‍70 kg
European U23 Championships
Gold medal – first place	2011 Tyumen	‍–‍70 kg
Silver medal – second place	2010 Sarajevo	‍–‍70 kg
Summer Universiade
Silver medal – second place	2011 Shenzhen	‍–‍70 kg

Profile at external databases
- IJF: 2394
- JudoInside.com: 42565
- Updated on 24 May 2023

Laura Vargas Koch (born 29 June 1990) is a German former judoka and Olympic medalist and computer scientist and applied mathematician. She is University Professor at RWTH Aachen University where she heads the chair of algorithmic game theory and discrete mathematics.

== Judo competition ==
Vargas Koch competed at the 2016 Summer Olympics in Rio de Janeiro in the women's 70 kg division. She won a bronze medal by defeating María Bernabéu of Spain in the bronze medal match. She retired in 2020 after a knee injury.

== Academic career ==
She completed a Ph.D. in 2020 at RWTH Aachen University with the dissertation Competitive variants of discrete and continuous flows over time supervised by Britta Peis. Her research concerns algorithmic game theory applied to problems including traffic flow and network routing. She took a professorship at the University of Bonn after postdoctoral research with Rico Zenklusen at ETH Zurich and with José Correa at the Center for Mathematical Modeling of the University of Chile, before returning to RWTH Aachen as a professor.
