= Linda Bolder =

Dutch judoka

Personal information
- Born: July 3, 1988 (age 38) Velserbroek, Netherlands
- Occupation: Judoka

Sport
- Country: Netherlands (2009–14); Israel (2015–17)
- Sport: Judo
- Weight class: ‍–‍70 kg
- Coached by: Ben Rietdijk and Shany Hershko

Achievements and titles
- Olympic Games: 7th (2016)
- World Champ.: R32 (2011, 2013)
- European Champ.: (silver) (2013)
Medal record
Women's judo
Representing the Netherlands
European Championships
Silver medal – second place	2013 Budapest	‍–‍70 kg
World Masters
Bronze medal – third place	2013 Tyumen	‍–‍70 kg
IJF Grand Slam
Gold medal – first place	2012 Tokyo	‍–‍70 kg
Gold medal – first place	2014 Paris	‍–‍70 kg
Bronze medal – third place	2013 Moscow	‍–‍70 kg
IJF Grand Prix
Gold medal – first place	2010 Qingdao	‍–‍70 kg
Bronze medal – third place	2010 Rotterdam	‍–‍70 kg
Bronze medal – third place	2011 Baku	‍–‍70 kg
Bronze medal – third place	2011 Abu Dhabi	‍–‍70 kg
European U23 Championships
Gold medal – first place	2008 Zagreb	‍–‍70 kg
Silver medal – second place	2009 Antalya	‍–‍70 kg
European Junior Championships
Gold medal – first place	2007 Prague	‍–‍70 kg
Bronze medal – third place	2006 Tallinn	‍–‍70 kg
European Cadet Championships
Gold medal – first place	2004 Rotterdam	‍–‍63 kg
Representing Israel
IJF Grand Slam
Silver medal – second place	2015 Tyumen	‍–‍70 kg
Bronze medal – third place	2015 Tokyo	‍–‍70 kg
IJF Grand Prix
Gold medal – first place	2015 Samsun	‍–‍70 kg
Gold medal – first place	2015 Zagreb	‍–‍70 kg
Gold medal – first place	2016 Havana	‍–‍70 kg
Bronze medal – third place	2015 Tbilisi	‍–‍70 kg

Profile at external databases
- IJF: 18897, 1878
- JudoInside.com: 27146
- Updated on 14 November 2022

Linda Bolder (Hebrew: לינדה בולדר; born 3 July 1988 in Velserbroek, Netherlands) is a Dutch-born Israeli Olympic judoka.

A three-time European age-group judo champion as a junior, two-time Dutch senior women's champion, and silver medalist in the 2013 European Championships, she emigrated to Israel with her Jewish husband in January 2015. Bolder represented Israel at the 2016 Summer Olympics in the women's under-70kg competition, making it to the quarter-finals.

== Judo career ==
Bolder started taking judo classes at the age of four.

=== For the Netherlands (2004–14) ===
In 2004, Bolder won both the Under-17 Dutch Championship and the Under-20 Dutch Championship in the ‍–‍63 kg weight class. She repeated as Under-20 Dutch Champion in 2006 and 2007, but in the ‍–‍70 kg weight class. In 2009 and 2012 she won the senior Dutch Championship in the ‍–‍70 kg weight class.

Bolder won the 2004 European Cadet Championships, the 2007 European Junior Championships and the 2008 European U23 Championships.

In 2005 Bolder won the Kent International Crystal Palace in the ‍–‍70 kg weight class, in 2010 she won the IJF World Cup Cairo and the 2010 Qingdao Grand Prix in the ‍–‍70 kg weight class, and in 2012 she won the World Cup Rome and the 2012 Tokyo Grand Slam in the ‍–‍70 kg weight class and the Swiss Judo Open Geneve in the ‍–‍78 kg weight class.

Bolder won the silver medal in the 2013 European Championships, representing the Netherlands.

Bolder won the 2014 Paris Grand Slam in the ‍–‍70 kg weight class. In February Bolder was injured at the 2014 Düsseldorf Grand Prix in Germany, and had knee ligament reconstruction surgery that kept her from competing for the remainder of the year.

=== For Israel (2015–present) ===
On 1 January 2015 Bolder made aliyah by moving to Israel with her Dutch Jewish husband, a businessman, and started to represent the Israeli National Team that year. She trained with the Israeli team at the Wingate Institute in Netanya, Israel. Her coaches were Ben Rietdijk and Shany Hershko.

Bolder won the 2015 Samsun Grand Prix and the 2015 Zagreb Grand Prix, and in the following January Bolder won the 2016 Havana Grand Prix, in the ‍–‍70 kg weight class.

==== Olympics ====
Bolder represented Israel at the 2016 Summer Olympics, as the 9th seed in the women's under-70kg competition. She won her first round match against Congolese-born Brazilian Yolande Mabika on 10 August, with a choke hold just over a minute into the bout, and won her second-round match against Korean Kim Seong-yeon. In the quarter-finals, she was defeated by Sally Conway of the United Kingdom. She competed for a chance at the bronze medal in the repechage match, but lost to Spain's María Bernabéu.

== Medals ==
Year	Tournament	Place	Rep.	Ref.
2010	Grand Prix Rotterdam	3rd place, bronze medalist(s)	NED	
2010	Grand Prix Qingdao	1st place, gold medalist(s)	NED	
2011	Grand Prix Baku	3rd place, bronze medalist(s)	NED	
2011	Grand Prix Abu Dhabi	3rd place, bronze medalist(s)	NED	
2012	Grand Slam Tokyo	1st place, gold medalist(s)	NED	
2013	European Championships	2nd place, silver medalist(s)	NED	
2013	World Masters	3rd place, bronze medalist(s)	NED	
2013	Grand Slam Moscow	3rd place, bronze medalist(s)	NED	
2014	Grand Slam Paris	1st place, gold medalist(s)	NED	
2015	Grand Prix Tbilisi	3rd place, bronze medalist(s)	ISR	
2015	Grand Prix Samsun	1st place, gold medalist(s)	ISR	
2015	Grand Prix Zagreb	1st place, gold medalist(s)	ISR	
2015	Grand Slam Tyumen	2nd place, silver medalist(s)	ISR	
2015	Grand Slam Tokyo	3rd place, bronze medalist(s)	ISR	
2016	Grand Prix Havana	1st place, gold medalist(s)	ISR	
