= 2013 World Judo Championships – Women's 63 kg =

Judo competition

Judo Women's 63 kg at the 2013 World Judo Championships
- Venue: Ginásio do Maracanãzinho
- Location: Rio de Janeiro, Brazil
- Date: 29 August 2013
- Competitors: 47 from 38 nations

Medalists
gold medal	Yarden Gerbi (1st title)	Israel
silver medal	Clarisse Agbegnenou	France
bronze medal	Gévrise Émane	France
bronze medal	Anicka van Emden	Netherlands

Competition at external databases
- Links: IJF • JudoInside

The women's 63 kg competition of the 2013 World Judo Championships was held on August 29.

== Medalists ==
Gold	Silver	Bronze
(Israel) Yarden Gerbi	(France) Clarisse Agbegnenou	(France) Gévrise Émane (Netherlands) Anicka van Emden

== Results ==
=== Finals ===
Semi-finals
(Israel) Yarden Gerbi	100
(Japan) Kana Abe	000
(France) Clarisse Agbegnenou	100
(France) Gévrise Émane	000

Final
(Israel) Yarden Gerbi	101
(France) Clarisse Agbegnenou	000

=== Repechage ===
Repechage
(Slovenia) Tina Trstenjak	101
(Japan) Miki Tanaka	000

Third place
(Slovenia) Tina Trstenjak	000
(France) Gévrise Émane	100

Repechage
(Germany) Martyna Trajdos	000
(Netherlands) Anicka van Emden	011

Third place
(Netherlands) Anicka van Emden	010
(Japan) Kana Abe	000

=== Pool A ===
First Round
(Australia) Karen da Silva	000
(El Salvador) Karla Catota Quijano	100
(Italy) Valentina Giorgis	100
(China) Shi Cuijuan	000
(Colombia) Diana Velasco	000
(Austria) Kathrin Unterwurzacher	100
(Nepal) Sunita Magar	000
(Ukraine) Svitlana Chepurina	100

Round of 32
(Israel) Yarden Gerbi	100
(El Salvador) Karla Catota Quijano	000
(Italy) Valentina Giorgis	001
(Mongolia) Tsend-Ayuushiin Tserennadmid	000
(Slovenia) Tina Trstenjak	010
(Austria) Kathrin Unterwurzacher	000
(South Korea) Joung Da-Woon	000
(Ukraine) Svitlana Chepurina	100

Round of 16
(Israel) Yarden Gerbi	101
(Italy) Valentina Giorgis	000
(Slovenia) Tina Trstenjak	000
(Ukraine) Svitlana Chepurina	000

Quarterfinals
(Israel) Yarden Gerbi	100
(Slovenia) Tina Trstenjak	000

=== Pool B ===
First Round
(Sweden) Mia Hermansson	001
(Poland) Halima Mohamed-Seghir	000
(Canada) Catherine Beauchemin-Pinard	000
(Spain) Isabel Puche	010
(Cuba) Maricet Espinosa	100
(Croatia) Marijana Miskovic	000
(Cameroon) Paule Sitcheping	101
(Guinea) Mamadama Bangoura	001

Round of 32
(Japan) Kana Abe	100
(Sweden) Mia Hermansson	000
(Burkina Faso) Séverine Nébié	000
(Spain) Isabel Puche	101
(Japan) Miki Tanaka	100
(Cuba) Maricet Espinosa	000
(Cameroon) Paule Sitcheping	000
(Ecuador) Estefania Garcia	000

Round of 16
(Japan) Kana Abe	100
(Spain) Isabel Puche	000
(Japan) Miki Tanaka	100
(Ecuador) Estefania Garcia	000

Quarterfinals
(Japan) Kana Abe	011
(Japan) Miki Tanaka	001

=== Pool C ===
First Round
(Morocco) Rizlen Zouak	101
(North Macedonia) Katerina Nikoloska	000
(Turkey) Bahar Buker	100
(Algeria) Sonia Miziouallaoua	000
(Russia) Marta Labazina	100
(Venezuela) Wisneybi Machado	000
(Mongolia) Baldorjiin Mungunchimeg	010
(China) Qi Jingjing	001

Round of 32
(France) Clarisse Agbegnenou	101
(Morocco) Rizlen Zouak	000
(Turkey) Bahar Buker	000
(Portugal) Ana Cachola	010
(Germany) Martyna Trajdos	100
(Russia) Marta Labazina	000
(North Korea) Kim Su-Gyong	101
(Mongolia) Baldorjiin Mungunchimeg	000

Round of 16
(France) Clarisse Agbegnenou	100
(Portugal) Ana Cachola	000
(Germany) Martyna Trajdos	000
(North Korea) Kim Su-Gyong	000

Quarterfinals
(France) Clarisse Agbegnenou	101
(Germany) Martyna Trajdos	000

=== Pool D ===
First Round
(Brazil) Katherine Campos	100
(Guatemala) Yennifer Dominguez	000
(Sweden) Anna Bernholm	100
(Argentina) Mariana López	000
(United States) Hannah Martin	101
(Cameroon) Helene Dombeu	000

Round of 32
(Netherlands) Anicka van Emden	000
(Brazil) Katherine Campos	000
(Italy) Edwige Gwend	000
(Austria) Hilde Drexler	000
(France) Gévrise Émane	001
(Sweden) Anna Bernholm	001
(Colombia) Brigitte Carabalí	000
(United States) Hannah Martin	101

Round of 16
(Netherlands) Anicka van Emden	000
(Italy) Edwige Gwend	000
(France) Gévrise Émane	000
(United States) Hannah Martin	000

Quarterfinals
(Netherlands) Anicka van Emden	000
(France) Gévrise Émane	000
