= 2017 European Judo Championships – Women's 63 kg =

Judo competition

Judo Women's 63 kg at the 2017 European Judo Championships
- Venue: Torwar Hall
- Location: Warsaw, Poland
- Date: April 21, 2017
- Competitors: 22 from 13 nations

Medalists
gold medal	Tina Trstenjak (2nd title)	Slovenia
silver medal	Margaux Pinot	France
bronze medal	Alice Schlesinger	Great Britain
bronze medal	Kathrin Unterwurzacher	Austria

Competition at external databases
- Links: IJF • JudoInside

The women's 63 kg competition at the 2017 European Judo Championships in Warsaw were held on 21 April at the Torwar Hall.

== Results ==
=== Finals ===
Semi-finals
Tina Trstenjak (SLO)	100
Martyna Trajdos (GER)	000
Clarisse Agbegnenou (FRA)	000
Margaux Pinot (FRA)	100

Final
Tina Trstenjak (SLO)	000
Margaux Pinot (FRA)	000

=== Repechages ===
Repechage		Bronze medal
Edwige Gwend (ITA)	000
Alice Schlesinger (GBR)	010	Alice Schlesinger (GBR)	100
		Clarisse Agbegnenou (FRA)	000

Repechage		Bronze medal
Ekaterina Valkova (RUS)	000
Kathrin Unterwurzacher (AUT)	100	Kathrin Unterwurzacher (AUT)	010
		Martyna Trajdos (GER)	000

=== Pool A ===
First round		Second round		Quarterfinals
		Tina Trstenjak (SLO)	110
Maja Blagojevic (CRO)	000	Daria Davydova (RUS)	000
Daria Davydova (RUS)	010			Tina Trstenjak (SLO)	010
				Edwige Gwend (ITA)	000
		Edwige Gwend (ITA)	000
		Isabel Puche (ESP)	000

=== Pool B ===
First round
Karolina Tałach (POL)	100
Sanne Vermeer (NED)	000
Magdalena Krssakova (AUT)	020
Rotem Shor (ISR)	000

Second round
Alice Schlesinger (GBR)	110
Karolina Tałach (POL)	000
Martyna Trajdos (GER)	020
Magdalena Krssakova (AUT)	000

Quarterfinals
Alice Schlesinger (GBR)	010
Martyna Trajdos (GER)	020

=== Pool C ===
First round
Daniela Kazanoi (BLR)	000
Amy Livesey (GBR)	010
Marijana Miskovic Hasanbegovic (CRO)	000
Ekaterina Valkova (RUS)	030

Second round
Clarisse Agbegnenou (FRA)	100
Amy Livesey (GBR)	000
Andreja Leški (SLO)	000
Ekaterina Valkova (RUS)	010

Quarterfinals
Clarisse Agbegnenou (FRA)	020
Ekaterina Valkova (RUS)	000

=== Pool D ===
First round
Nadja Bazynski (GER)	110
Cristina Cabaña Perez (ESP)	000

Second round
Kathrin Unterwurzacher (AUT)	110
Agata Ozdoba (POL)	000
Margaux Pinot (FRA)	110
Nadja Bazynski (GER)	000

Quarterfinals
Kathrin Unterwurzacher (AUT)	000
Margaux Pinot (FRA)	110
