= Judo at the 2015 European Games – Women's 63 kg =

Judo competition

Judo Women's 63 kg at the 2015 European Games
- Venue: Heydar Aliyev Arena
- Location: Baku, Azerbaijan
- Date: 26 June
- Competitors: 26 from 19 nations

Medalists
gold medal	Martyna Trajdos (1st title)	Germany
silver medal	Tina Trstenjak	Slovenia
bronze medal	Yarden Gerbi	Israel
bronze medal	Clarisse Agbegnenou	France

Competition at external databases
- Links: IJF • JudoInside

The women's 63 kg judo event at the 2015 European Games in Baku was held on 26 June at the Heydar Aliyev Arena.

== Results ==
=== Final ===
Final
Martyna Trajdos (GER)	010
Tina Trstenjak (SLO)	000

=== Repechage ===
Repechage
Ana Cachola (POR)	003
Kathrin Unterwurzacher (AUT)	000

Third place
Ana Cachola (POR)	000
Yarden Gerbi (ISR)	001

Repechage
Mia Hermansson (SWE)	000
Juul Franssen (NED)	100

Third place
Juul Franssen (NED)	000
Clarisse Agbegnenou (FRA)	011

=== Top half ===
Round of 32
Katerina Nikoloska (MKD)	001
Khanim Huseynova (AZE)	102
Marta Labazina (RUS)	000
Ana Cachola (POR)	100
Alice Schlesinger (GBR)	001
Anna Bernholm (SWE)	000
Laura Sallés (AND)	000
Nina Milošević (SLO)	001
Rotem Shor (ISR)	000
Marijana Mišković (CRO)	001

Round of 16
Clarisse Agbegnenou (FRA)	100
Khanim Huseynova (AZE)	000
Ana Cachola (POR)	001
Alice Schlesinger (GBR)	000
Kathrin Unterwurzacher (AUT)	001
Nina Milošević (SLO)	000
Martyna Trajdos (GER)	100
Marijana Mišković (CRO)	000

Quarterfinals
Clarisse Agbegnenou (FRA)	101
Ana Cachola (POR)	000
Kathrin Unterwurzacher (AUT)	000
Martyna Trajdos (GER)	101

Semifinals
Clarisse Agbegnenou (FRA)	000
Martyna Trajdos (GER)	000

=== Bottom half ===
Round of 32
Agata Ozdoba (POL)	100
Nuriyya Akhundova (AZE)	000
Hilde Drexler (AUT)	000
Gemma Howell (GBR)	000
Marcon Bezzina (MLT)	000
Mia Hermansson (SWE)	100
Isabel Puche (ESP)	000
Andreja Đaković (CRO)	000
Franciska Szabó (HUN)	000
Juul Franssen (NED)	000

Round of 16
Yarden Gerbi (ISR)	000
Agata Ozdoba (POL)	000
Gemma Howell (GBR)	000
Mia Hermansson (SWE)	010
Tina Trstenjak (SLO)	001
Andreja Đaković (CRO)	000
Edwige Gwend (ITA)	000
Juul Franssen (NED)	101

Quarterfinals
Yarden Gerbi (ISR)	001
Mia Hermansson (SWE)	000
Tina Trstenjak (SLO)	001
Juul Franssen (NED)	001

Semifinals
Yarden Gerbi (ISR)	000
Tina Trstenjak (SLO)	100
