= 2013 World Judo Championships – Women's team =

Judo competition

Judo Women's team at the 2013 World Judo Championships
- Venue: Ginásio do Maracanãzinho
- Location: Rio de Janeiro, Brazil
- Date: 1 September
- Competitors: 112 from 15 nations

Medalists
gold medal	Japan (4th title)
silver medal	Brazil
bronze medal	Cuba
bronze medal	France

Competition at external databases
- Links: IJF • JudoInside

The women's team competition of the 2013 World Judo Championships was held on 1 September.

== Medalists ==
Gold	Silver	Bronze
Japan; Yuki Hashimoto; Anzu Yamamoto; Kana Abe; Haruka Tachimoto; Megumi Tachimoto; Miki Tanaka	Brazil; Érika Miranda; Rafaela Silva; Katherine Campos; Maria Portela; Mayra Aguiar; Maria Suelen Altheman; Mariana Silva	Cuba; Maria Celia Laborde; Yanet Bermoy; Maricet Espinosa; Onix Cortés Aldama; Idalys Ortiz; France; Laëtitia Payet; Automne Pavia; Hélène Receveaux; Clarisse Agbegnenou; Gévrise Émane; Lucie Louette; Emilie Andeol
