= 2018 European Judo Championships – Women's 63 kg =

Judo competition

Judo Women's 63 kg at the 2018 European Judo Championships
- Venue: Expo Tel Aviv
- Location: Tel Aviv, Israel
- Date: 27 April

Medalists
gold medal	Clarisse Agbegnenou (3rd title)	France
silver medal	Tina Trstenjak	Slovenia
bronze medal	Lucy Renshall	Great Britain
bronze medal	Martyna Trajdos	Germany

Competition at external databases
- Links: IJF • JudoInside

The women's 63 kg competition at the 2018 European Judo Championships was held on 27 April at the Expo Tel Aviv.

== Results ==
=== Finals ===
Semi-finals
Clarisse Agbegnenou (FRA)	10
Martyna Trajdos (GER)	00
Tina Trstenjak (SLO)	11
Alice Schlesinger (GBR)	01

Final
Clarisse Agbegnenou (FRA)	10
Tina Trstenjak (SLO)	01

=== Repechage ===
Repechage
Lucy Renshall (GBR)	01
Tina Zeltner (AUT)	00

Third place
Lucy Renshall (GBR)	10
Alice Schlesinger (GBR)	00

Repechage
Ekaterina Valkova (RUS)	10
Gili Sharir (ISR)	00

Third place
Ekaterina Valkova (RUS)	00
Martyna Trajdos (GER)	10

=== Pool A ===
First round
Büşra Katipoğlu (TUR)	00
Daria Davydova (RUS)	01

Round of 16
Clarisse Agbegnenou (FRA)	10
Lærke Olsen (DEN)	00
Lucy Renshall (GBR)	10
Daria Davydova (RUS)	00

Quarterfinals
Clarisse Agbegnenou (FRA)	01
Lucy Renshall (GBR)	00

=== Pool B ===
First round
Agata Ozdoba-Błach (POL)	00
Sanne Vermeer (NED)	01
Tina Zeltner (AUT)	10
Yuliia Hrebenozhko (UKR)	00

Round of 16
Martyna Trajdos (GER)	10
Sanne Vermeer (NED)	00
Andreja Leški (SLO)	00
Tina Zeltner (AUT)	10

Quarterfinals
Martyna Trajdos (GER)	10
Tina Zeltner (AUT)	00

=== Pool C ===
First round
Ekaterina Valkova (RUS)	10
Isabel Puche (ESP)	00

Round of 16
Tina Trstenjak (SLO)	10
Karolina Tałach (POL)	00
Edwige Gwend (ITA)	00
Ekaterina Valkova (RUS)	10

Quarterfinals
Tina Trstenjak (SLO)	01
Ekaterina Valkova (RUS)	00

=== Pool D ===
First round
Alice Schlesinger (GBR)	11
Stefania Adelina Dobre (ROU)	00
Gili Sharir (ISR)	11
Mia Hermansson (SWE)	00

Round of 16
Juul Franssen (NED)	00
Alice Schlesinger (GBR)	10
Magdalena Krssakova (AUT)	00
Gili Sharir (ISR)	10

Quarterfinals
Alice Schlesinger (GBR)	10
Gili Sharir (ISR)	00
