= 2016 European Judo Championships – Women's 63 kg =

Judo competition

Judo Women's 63 kg at the 2016 European Judo Championships
- Venue: TatNeft Arena
- Location: Kazan, Russia
- Date: 22 April
- Competitors: 28 from 19 nations

Medalists
gold medal	Tina Trstenjak (1st title)	Slovenia
silver medal	Kathrin Unterwurzacher	Austria
bronze medal	Anicka van Emden	Netherlands
bronze medal	Ekaterina Valkova	Russia

Competition at external databases
- Links: IJF • JudoInside

The women's 63 kg competition at the 2016 European Judo Championships was held on 22 April at the TatNeft Arena, in Kazan, the largest city and capital of Tatarstan, Russia.

== Results ==
=== Finals ===
Semi-finals
Tina Trstenjak (SLO)	01
Edwige Gwend (ITA)	00
Kathrin Unterwurzacher (AUT)	01
Yarden Gerbi (ISR)	00

Final
Tina Trstenjak (SLO)	10
Kathrin Unterwurzacher (AUT)	00

=== Repechage ===
Repechage
Juul Franssen (NED)	00
Anicka van Emden (NED)	00

Third place
Anicka van Emden (NED)	00
Yarden Gerbi (ISR)	00

Repechage
Ekaterina Valkova (RUS)	10
Isabel Puche (ESP)	00

Third place
Ekaterina Valkova (RUS)	00
Edwige Gwend (ITA)	00

=== Pool A ===
First round
Franciska Szabó (HUN)	10
Cristina Cabaña (ESP)	00
Juul Franssen (NED)	10
Marijana Mišković Hasanbegović (CRO)	00
Büşra Katipoğlu (TUR)	00
Pari Surakatova (RUS)	00

Round of 16
Tina Trstenjak (SLO)	10
Franciska Szabó (HUN)	00
Juul Franssen (NED)	10
Büşra Katipoğlu (TUR)	00

Quarterfinals
Tina Trstenjak (SLO)	01
Juul Franssen (NED)	00

=== Pool B ===
First round
Amy Livesey (GBR)	00
Hilde Drexler (AUT)	00
Edwige Gwend (ITA)	00
Agata Ozdoba-Błach (POL)	00
Laura Sallés (AND)	00
Mia Hermansson (SWE)	10

Round of 16
Anicka van Emden (NED)	10
Amy Livesey (GBR)	00
Edwige Gwend (ITA)	10
Mia Hermansson (SWE)	00

Quarterfinals
Anicka van Emden (NED)	00
Edwige Gwend (ITA)	00

=== Pool C ===
First round
Karolina Tałach (POL)	00
Daniela Kazanoi (BLR)	01
Ekaterina Valkova (RUS)	10
Ana Cachola (POR)	00
Sarah Loko (BEL)	10
Andreja Đaković (CRO)	00

Round of 16
Kathrin Unterwurzacher (AUT)	11
Daniela Kazanoi (BLR)	00
Ekaterina Valkova (RUS)	10
Sarah Loko (BEL)	00

Quarterfinals
Kathrin Unterwurzacher (AUT)	10
Ekaterina Valkova (RUS)	00

=== Pool D ===
First round
Anna Bernholm (SWE)	01
Stefania Adelina Dobre (ROU)	10
Alice Schlesinger (GBR)	00
Nina Milošević (SLO)	00
Isabel Puche (ESP)	00
Ivana Komlóšiová (SVK)	00

Round of 16
Yarden Gerbi (ISR)	00
Stefania Adelina Dobre (ROU)	00
Alice Schlesinger (GBR)	00
Isabel Puche (ESP)	00

Quarterfinals
Yarden Gerbi (ISR)	00
Isabel Puche (ESP)	00
