= 2014 World Judo Championships – Women's 63 kg =

Judo competition

Judo Women's 63 kg at the 2014 World Judo Championships
- Venue: Traktor Ice Arena
- Location: Chelyabinsk, Russia
- Date: 28 August 2014
- Competitors: 41 from 34 nations
- Total prize money: 14,000$

Medalists
gold medal	Clarisse Agbegnenou (1st title)	France
silver medal	Yarden Gerbi	Israel
bronze medal	Miku Tashiro	Japan
bronze medal	Tina Trstenjak	Slovenia

Competition at external databases
- Links: IJF • JudoInside

The women's 63 kg competition of the 2014 World Judo Championships was held on 28 August.

== Medalists ==
Gold	Silver	Bronze
Clarisse Agbegnenou (FRA)	Yarden Gerbi (ISR)	Miku Tashiro (JPN); Tina Trstenjak (SLO)

== Results ==
=== Finals ===
Semi-finals
(France) Clarisse Agbegnenou	100
(France) Anne-Laure Bellard	000
(Israel) Yarden Gerbi	100
(Japan) Miku Tashiro	010

Final
(France) Clarisse Agbegnenou	101
(Israel) Yarden Gerbi	000

=== Repechage ===
Repechage		Third place
(Italy) Edwige Gwend	001
(Austria) Kathrin Unterwurzacher	000	(Italy) Edwige Gwend	000
		(Japan) Miku Tashiro	100

Repechage		Third place
(Slovenia) Tina Trstenjak	100
(Germany) Martyna Trajdos	000	(Slovenia) Tina Trstenjak	010
		(France) Anne-Laure Bellard	000

=== Pool A ===
First Round
(Sweden) Anna Bernholm	100
(Ecuador) Estefania Garcìa	010
(Tunisia) Meriem Bjaoui	000
(Morocco) Rizlen Zouak	101

Quarterfinals
(France) Clarisse Agbegnenou	001
(Sweden) Anna Bernholm	000
(China) Zhang Wen	011
(Turkmenistan) Gulnar Hayitbayeva	001
(Italy) Edwige Gwend	100
(Morocco) Rizlen Zouak	000
(Mongolia) Tsend-Ayush Tserennadmid	100
(Kyrgyzstan) Bubusaira Abdilmanap Kyzy	000

Semifinals
(France) Clarisse Agbegnenou	002
(China) Zhang Wen	000
(Italy) Edwige Gwend	000
(Mongolia) Tsend-Ayush Tserennadmid	000

Final
(France) Clarisse Agbegnenou	001
(Italy) Edwige Gwend	000

=== Pool B ===
First Round
(Cameroon) Helene Wezeu	001
(Mexico) Andrea Gutiérrez	001
(Spain) Isabel Puche	100
(United States) Leilani Akiyama	000
(Brazil) Mariana Silva	100
(Andorra) Laura Salles	000

Quarterfinals
(Austria) Kathrin Unterwurzacher	100
(Venezuela) Wisneybi Machado	000
(Algeria) Souad Belakhal	001
(Mexico) Andrea Gutiérrez	001
(France) Anne-Laure Bellard	101
(Spain) Isabel Puche	000
(Poland) Agata Ozdoba	000
(Brazil) Mariana Silva	010

Semifinals
(Austria) Kathrin Unterwurzacher	010
(Mexico) Andrea Gutiérrez	000
(France) Anne-Laure Bellard	101
(Brazil) Mariana Silva	000

Final
(Austria) Kathrin Unterwurzacher	001
(France) Anne-Laure Bellard	010

=== Pool C ===
First Round
(El Salvador) Karla Catota	000
(Cuba) Maylín del Toro	100
(Russia) Marta Labazina	000
(Mongolia) Mungunchimeg Baldorj	000

Quarterfinals
(Israel) Yarden Gerbi	110
(Portugal) Ana Cachola	000
(Belarus) Daniela Kazanoi	000
(Cuba) Maylín del Toro	001
(Slovenia) Tina Trstenjak	000
(United States) Hannah Martin	000
(Sweden) Mia Hermansson	011
(Mongolia) Mungunchimeg Baldorj	000

Semifinals
(Israel) Yarden Gerbi	100
(Cuba) Maylín del Toro	000
(Slovenia) Tina Trstenjak	100
(Sweden) Mia Hermansson	000

Final
(Israel) Yarden Gerbi	100
(Slovenia) Tina Trstenjak	000

=== Pool D ===
First Round
(Japan) Miku Tashiro	100
(Algeria) Imene Agouar	000
(Austria) Hilde Drexler	000
(Ghana) Szandra Szogedi	000

Quarterfinals
(Netherlands) Anicka van Emden	100
(Turkmenistan) Zuhra Madraimova	000
(Japan) Miku Tashiro	100
(South Korea) Bak Ji-yun	000
(Germany) Martyna Trajdos	000
(North Korea) Kim Su-gyong	000
(Kazakhstan) Zamzagul Faizollanova	000
(Austria) Hilde Drexler	000

Semifinals
(Netherlands) Anicka van Emden	000
(Japan) Miku Tashiro	100
(Germany) Martyna Trajdos	000
(Austria) Hilde Drexler	000

Final
(Japan) Miku Tashiro	100
(Germany) Martyna Trajdos	000

== Prize money ==
The sums listed bring the total prizes awarded to 14,000$ for the individual event.

Medal	Total	Judoka	Coach
Gold	6,000$	4,800$	1,200$
Silver	4,000$	3,200$	800$
Bronze	2,000$	1,600$	400$
