= Judo at the 2015 European Games – Women's team =

Judo Women's team at the 2015 European Games
- Venue: Heydar Aliyev Arena
- Location: Baku, Azerbaijan
- Date: 28 June
- Nations: 7

Medalists
gold medal	Clarisse Agbegnenou; Émilie Andéol; Laetitia Blot; Gévrise Émane; Annabelle Euranie; Marie-Ève Gahié; Madeleine Malonga; Automne Pavia	France
silver medal	Szaundra Diedrich; Franziska Konitz; Mareen Kräh; Luise Malzahn; Miryam Roper; Martyna Trajdos; Laura Vargas Koch; Viola Wächter	Germany
bronze medal	Giulia Cantoni; Assunta Galeone; Odette Giuffrida; Edwige Gwend; Elisa Marchio; Valentina Moscatt; Giulia Quintavalle	Italy
bronze medal	Klara Apotekar; Vlora Beđeti; Nina Milošević; Petra Nareks; Anka Pogačnik; Tina Trstenjak; Anamari Velenšek; Kristina Vršič	Slovenia

Champions
- Women's team: France (20th title)

Competition at external databases
- Links: JudoInside

The women's team judo event at the 2015 European Games in Baku was held on 28 June at the Heydar Aliyev Arena.

== Results ==
Quarterfinals
Slovenia	3
Italy	2
Germany	3
Hungary	2
Poland	2
Russia	3

Semifinals
France	5
Slovenia	0
Germany	3
Russia	2

Final
France	4
Germany	1

Repechage

Repechage

Third place
Italy	3
Russia	2

Repechage
Hungary	3
Poland	2

Third place
Hungary	2
Slovenia	3
