= Andrea Gutiérrez =

Andrea Gutiérrez may refer to:

- Andrea Gutiérrez (judoka), competitor in the 2014 World Judo Championships – Women's 63 kg
- Andrea Gutierrez; see List of Person of Interest episodes
