= Amy Livesey =

British judoka (born 1993)

Personal information
- Nationality: British (English)
- Born: 31 December 1993 (age 32)
- Occupation: Judoka

Sport
- Country: Great Britain
- Sport: Judo
- Weight class: –63 kg

Achievements and titles
- World Champ.: 7th (2017)
- European Champ.: R16 (2016, 2017)
Medal record
Women's judo
Representing Great Britain
IJF Grand Slam
Bronze medal – third place	2017 Ekaterinburg	–63 kg
Bronze medal – third place	2019 Brasilia	–63 kg
Bronze medal – third place	2021 Tashkent	–63 kg
IJF Grand Prix
Silver medal – second place	2017 Cancún	–63 kg
Silver medal – second place	2019 Montreal	–63 kg
Bronze medal – third place	2016 Budapest	–63 kg
Bronze medal – third place	2018 Cancún	–63 kg
Bronze medal – third place	2018 The Hague	–63 kg
Bronze medal – third place	2019 Antalya	–63 kg
European U23 Championships
Gold medal – first place	2015 Bratislava	–63 kg

Profile at external databases
- IJF: 9559
- JudoInside.com: 51695
- Updated on 21 November 2022

Amy Livesey (born 31 December 1993) is a British judoka.

== Judo career ==
She is the bronze medallist of the 2017 Judo Grand Slam Ekaterinburg in the -63 kg category. She became champion of Great Britain, winning the half-middleweight division at the British Judo Championships in 2018.

== Personal history ==
Amy Livesey has a sister named Bekky Livesey, who has won British championships at half-middleweight and a brother Owen Livesey, who is a three-times British champion at half-middleweight.
