= Lucy Renshall =

British judoka (born 1995)

Personal information
- Nationality: British (English)
- Born: 11 December 1995 (age 30) St Helens, England
- Occupation: Judoka

Sport
- Sport: Judo
- Weight class: ‍–‍63 kg

Achievements and titles
- Olympic Games: R16 (2024)
- World Champ.: 7th (2022)
- European Champ.: (bronze) (2018)
Medal record
Women's judo
Representing Great Britain
European Championships
Bronze medal – third place	2018 Tel Aviv	‍–‍63 kg
IJF Grand Slam
Gold medal – first place	2021 Antalya	‍–‍63 kg
Gold medal – first place	2021 Baku	‍–‍63 kg
Gold medal – first place	2021 Abu Dhabi	‍–‍63 kg
Gold medal – first place	2022 Antalya	‍–‍63 kg
Gold medal – first place	2022 Abu Dhabi	‍–‍63 kg
Gold medal – first place	2023 Tbilisi	‍–‍63 kg
Silver medal – second place	2017 Abu Dhabi	‍–‍63 kg
Silver medal – second place	2019 Ekaterinburg	‍–‍63 kg
Silver medal – second place	2021 Paris	‍–‍63 kg
Bronze medal – third place	2023 Tel Aviv	‍–‍63 kg
Bronze medal – third place	2024 Paris	‍–‍63 kg
IJF Grand Prix
Gold medal – first place	2023 Zagreb	‍–‍63 kg
Gold medal – first place	2024 Odivelas	‍–‍63 kg
Silver medal – second place	2016 Qingdao	‍–‍63 kg
Bronze medal – third place	2017 Zagreb	‍–‍63 kg
Bronze medal – third place	2018 Tbilisi	‍–‍63 kg
Bronze medal – third place	2019 Tashkent	‍–‍63 kg
Bronze medal – third place	2025 Zagreb	‍–‍63 kg
European U23 Championships
Gold medal – first place	2016 Tel Aviv	‍–‍63 kg
World Juniors Championships
Bronze medal – third place	2015 Abu Dhabi	‍–‍63 kg
European Junior Championships
Gold medal – first place	2015 Oberwart	‍–‍63 kg
European Cadet Championships
Silver medal – second place	2011 Cottonera	‍–‍52 kg

Profile at external databases
- IJF: 7847
- JudoInside.com: 66145
- Updated on 17 November 2025

Lucy Renshall (born 11 December 1995) is a British judoka, who competed at the 2020 Summer Olympics held in Tokyo, Japan.

== Early life and education ==
Renshall is from Eccleston, St Helens. At age 8, she joined SKK Judo Club in Earlestown. She later trained at the British Judo Centre in Walsall and studied at the University of Wolverhampton.

== Judo career ==
Renshall won her first four British half-middleweight titles at the British Judo Championships in 2015, 2016, 2017 and 2021.

In 2020, Renshall was selected to represent Great Britain at the 2020 Summer Olympics in Tokyo, where she competed in the women's 63 kg category.

Renshall is the 2021 Judo Grand Slam Antalya champion in the ‍–‍63 kg class. She also won the gold medal in her event at the 2021 Judo Grand Slam Baku held in Baku, Azerbaijan. She repeated this at the 2021 Judo Grand Slam Abu Dhabi held in Abu Dhabi, United Arab Emirates.

At the 2024 Summer Olympics in Paris, Renshall defeated Australian judoka Katharina Haecker via golden score in the first round but lost her next contest by the same method to Lubjana Piovesana, who until three years earlier had been her Great Britain teammate before switching to represent Austria.

In December 2024, Renshall won her fifth British half-middleweight title at the British Judo Championships.
