= Yarden Gerbi =

Israeli judoka (born 1989)

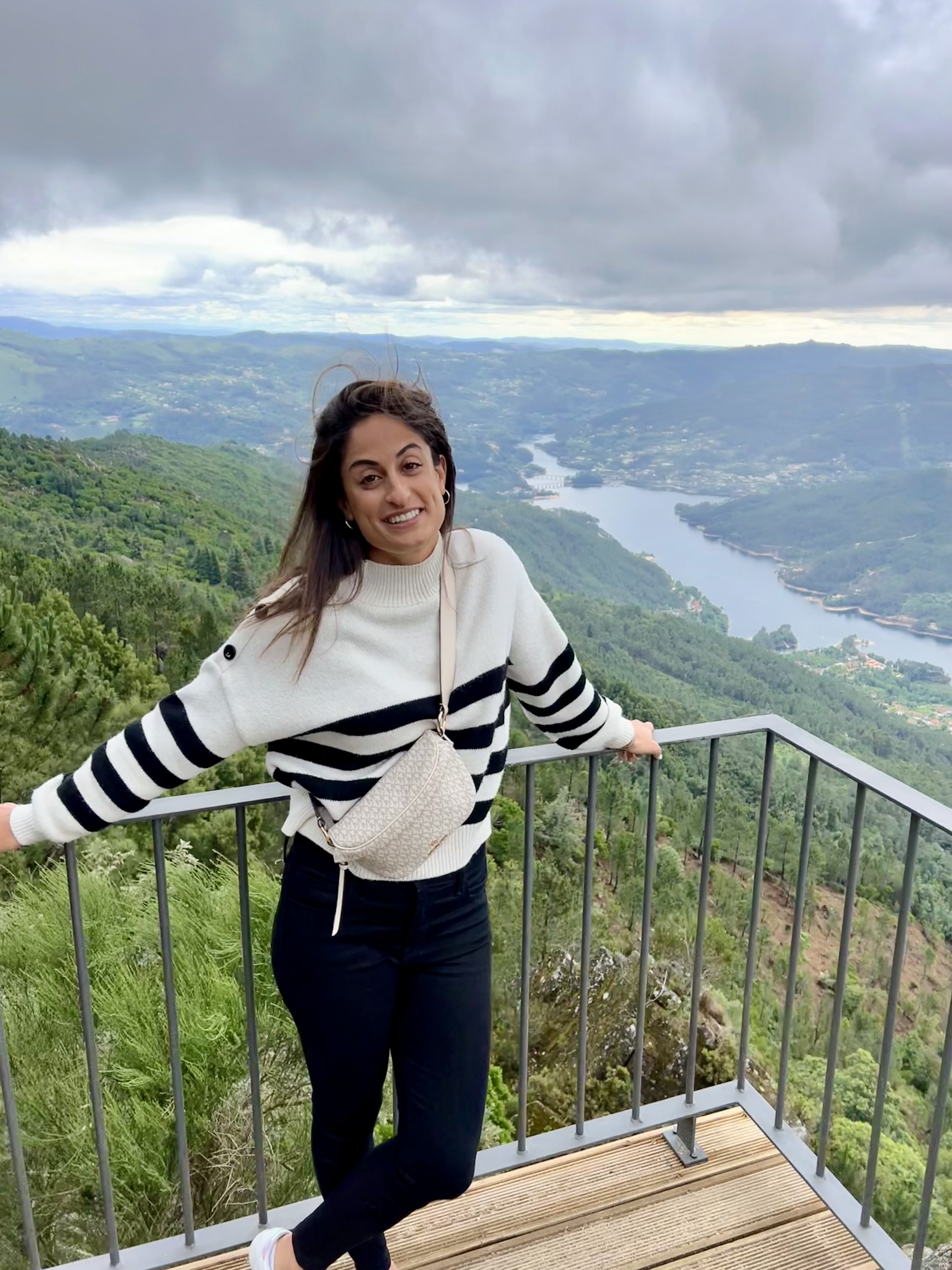
- Gerbi in 2022

Personal information
- Native name: ירדן ג'רבי
- Born: 8 July 1989 (age 37) Kfar Saba, Israel
- Occupation: Judoka
- Height: 1.69 m (5 ft 7 in)

Sport
- Country: Israel
- Sport: Judo
- Weight class: ‍–‍63 kg
- Rank: 6th dan black belt
- Club: Meitav Netanya
- Coached by: Shany Hershko

Achievements and titles
- Olympic Games: (bronze) (2016)
- World Champ.: (gold) (2013)
- European Champ.: (silver) (2012)
- Highest world ranking: 1 (2013)
Medal record
Women's judo
Representing Israel
Olympic Games
Bronze medal – third place	2016 Rio de Janeiro	‍–‍63 kg
World Championships
Gold medal – first place	2013 Rio de Janeiro	‍–‍63 kg
Silver medal – second place	2014 Chelyabinsk	‍–‍63 kg
European Games
Bronze medal – third place	2015 Baku	‍–‍63 kg
European Championships
Silver medal – second place	2012 Chelyabinsk	‍–‍63 kg
Bronze medal – third place	2013 Budapest	‍–‍63 kg
World Masters
Silver medal – second place	2013 Tyumen	‍–‍63 kg
Bronze medal – third place	2011 Baku	‍–‍63 kg
IJF Grand Slam
Gold medal – first place	2013 Baku	‍–‍63 kg
Gold medal – first place	2013 Moscow	‍–‍63 kg
Bronze medal – third place	2011 Moscow	‍–‍63 kg
Bronze medal – third place	2015 Tyumen	‍–‍63 kg
Bronze medal – third place	2015 Paris	‍–‍63 kg
Bronze medal – third place	2015 Abu Dhabi	‍–‍63 kg
IJF Grand Prix
Gold medal – first place	2014 Astana	‍–‍63 kg
Gold medal – first place	2014 Tashkent	‍–‍63 kg
Gold medal – first place	2014 Qingdao	‍–‍63 kg
Gold medal – first place	2016 Havana	‍–‍63 kg
Silver medal – second place	2010 Qingdao	‍–‍63 kg
Silver medal – second place	2013 Samsun	‍–‍63 kg
Silver medal – second place	2014 Düsseldorf	‍–‍63 kg
Silver medal – second place	2014 Tbilisi	‍–‍63 kg
Bronze medal – third place	2009 Qingdao	‍–‍63 kg
Bronze medal – third place	2012 Düsseldorf	‍–‍63 kg
Bronze medal – third place	2013 Düsseldorf	‍–‍63 kg
Bronze medal – third place	2015 Zagreb	‍–‍63 kg
European Junior Championships
Bronze medal – third place	2008 Warsaw	‍–‍63 kg
Maccabiah Games
Silver medal – second place	2009 Tel Aviv	‍–‍63 kg

Profile at external databases
- IJF: 1880
- JudoInside.com: 33724
- Updated on 17 May 2023

Yarden Gerbi (or Jerbi, Hebrew: ירדן ג'רבי; born 8 July 1989) is an Israeli former judoka world champion. She won an Olympic bronze medal competing for Israel at the 2016 Summer Olympics, in women's 63 kg judo.

Gerbi won the gold medal at the 2013 World Judo Championships in the ‍–‍63 kg category. She won the Israeli championship five times by the age of 24, and was a silver medalist in the 2009 Maccabiah Games.

== Personal life ==
Gerbi was born in Kfar Saba, Israel, to a family of Tunisian Jewish descent from Djerba. She was raised and also currently resides in Netanya, Israel. Her nicknames are Jordan, Gerb, and Denush. She attended the Open University of Israel, studying Economics and Management.

On 27 September 2022, Gerbi came out as gay and revealed her then-ongoing relationship with photographer Dana Lavi, daughter of Israeli actor Amos Lavi. They split up the following year.

In the summer of 2023 Gerbi began a relationship with Adi Imbar. The couple announced their engagement in April 2024.

== Judo career ==
=== Early career ===
Gerbi, who began practicing judo at age 6, trains with club Meditav Netanya. Shany Hershko, former coach of the Israeli women's national judo team, has been her trainer since childhood.

In 2007, Gerbi won the Israel Championships.

In 2008, Gerbi won the Israel Championships, the Under-23 Israel Championships, and took third in the 2008 European Junior Championships.

In 2009, Gerbi won the Israel Championships and the Belo Horizonte World Cup, placed second in the 2009 Maccabiah Games and took third place in the 2009 Qingdao Grand Prix.

Gerbi came in second in the 2010 Qingdao Grand Prix. That year she also finished second in the Baku and Birmingham World Cups, third in the Warsaw World Cup and came in 7th place at the 2010 World Championships. In 2011, she won the Israeli Championships, came in second in the San Salvador and Miami World Cups, third in the 2011 Moscow Grand Slam and the 2011 World Masters in Baku, and fifth in the 2011 European Championships. Gerbi was eliminated in the third round of the 2011 World Championships and did not qualify to represent Israel at the 2012 Summer Olympics.

In 2012, Gerbi won the Tashkent World Cup and the Israel Championships, took second in the 2012 European Championships in Russia, and took third in the 2012 Düsseldorf Grand Prix.

In 2013, prior to the World Championships, Gerbi won the 2013 Baku Grand Slam and the 2013 Moscow Grand Slam, took second in the 2013 Samsun Grand Prix, third in the 2013 Düsseldorf Grand Prix and at the 2013 European Championships. She achieved a world ranking of No. 1 in May 2013.

=== 2013 World Champion ===
In August 2013, at the age of 24, she won the gold medal at the 2013 World Championships in Rio de Janeiro in the category ‍–‍63 kg, defeating each of her five opponents unconditionally. She defeated No. 2-ranked Clarisse Agbegnenou of France, the European champion, in the final by dislocating her shoulder and rendering her unconscious with a chokehold in 43 seconds. She recorded an ippon in each of her five fights on the way to the championship. Commenting on the reaction from Israelis to her championship, she said: "I received three marriage proposals."

Gerbi became the first Israeli to win a gold medal at the Judo World Championships. Israelis Yael Arad (1991 – bronze, 1993 – silver), Oren Smadja (1995 – silver), and Ariel Ze'evi (2001 – silver) had each previously won a silver medal in the championships, and Alice Schlesinger had most recently won a bronze medal in 2009; also Olympic medals, which is Gerbi's next goal, have been won by Arad (Barcelona 1992 – silver), Smadja (Barcelona 1992 – bronze), and Ze'evi (Athens 2004 – bronze).

Gerbi was voted Israeli Sports Personality of the Year in 2013 by the readers of The Jerusalem Post.

=== 2014–15 ===
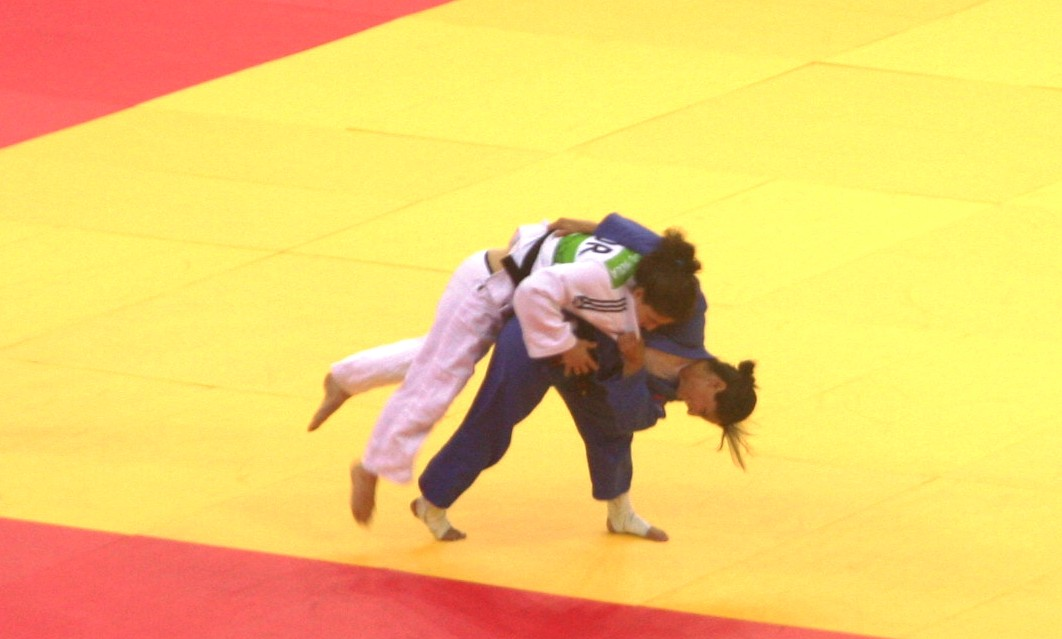
Gerbi (in blue) with Cachola from Portugal at the bronze final of the 2015 European Games (Baku)

At the 2014 World Championships in the Russian city of Chelyabinsk, Gerbi won the silver medal after losing by an ippon to Frenchwoman Clarice Agbegnenou in the final of the ‍–‍63 kg category.

In December 2014, Gerbi was named Israeli Sportswoman of the Year.

In 2015, Gerbi won a bronze medal at the 2015 European Games.

On 17 October, Gerbi won a bronze medal in the 2015 Paris Grand Slam after defeating Miho Minei from Japan. Two weeks later on 31 October 2015, she won bronze again, this time in the 2015 Abu Dhabi Grand Slam, after defeating Juul Franssen from the Netherlands.

=== Rio Olympics and retirement ===
On 9 August 2016, Gerbi won a bronze medal for her native Israel at the 2016 Summer Olympics in Rio de Janeiro, Brazil (shared with Anicka van Emden). Prior to her win, she was ranked among the top 14 eligible female judokas in her category as of 30 May 2016. After losing to hometown Brazilian Mariana Silva in the quarter-finals, Gerbi won her next two repechage fights to win the bronze medal.

Gerbi took part in the torch lighting ceremony at the 2017 Maccabiah Games on 6 July 2017. On 2 October of that year, Gerbi announced her retirement from judo.

== Medals ==
Year	Tournament	Place	Ref.
2009	Grand Prix Qingdao	3rd place, bronze medalist(s)	
2010	Grand Prix Qingdao	2nd place, silver medalist(s)	
2011	World Masters	3rd place, bronze medalist(s)	
2011	Grand Slam Moscow	3rd place, bronze medalist(s)	
2012	Grand Prix Düsseldorf	3rd place, bronze medalist(s)	
2012	European Championships	2nd place, silver medalist(s)	
2013	Grand Prix Düsseldorf	3rd place, bronze medalist(s)	
2013	Grand Prix Samsun	2nd place, silver medalist(s)	
2013	European Championships	3rd place, bronze medalist(s)	
2013	Grand Slam Baku	1st place, gold medalist(s)	
2013	World Masters	2nd place, silver medalist(s)	
2013	Grand Slam Moscow	1st place, gold medalist(s)	
2013	World Championships	1st place, gold medalist(s)	
2014	Grand Prix Düsseldorf	2nd place, silver medalist(s)	
2014	Grand Prix Tbilisi	2nd place, silver medalist(s)	
2014	World Championships	2nd place, silver medalist(s)	
2014	Grand Prix Astana	1st place, gold medalist(s)	
2014	Grand Prix Tashkent	1st place, gold medalist(s)	
2014	Grand Prix Qingdao	1st place, gold medalist(s)	
2015	Grand Prix Zagreb	3rd place, bronze medalist(s)	
2015	European Games	3rd place, bronze medalist(s)	
2015	Grand Slam Tyumen	3rd place, bronze medalist(s)	
2015	Grand Slam Paris	3rd place, bronze medalist(s)	
2015	Grand Slam Abu Dhabi	3rd place, bronze medalist(s)	
2016	Grand Prix Havana	1st place, gold medalist(s)	
2016	Summer Olympics	3rd place, bronze medalist(s)	

== Media appearances ==
In 2020, Gerbi competed in the third VIP season of Israel's Survivor and finished in third place.

In 2021, Gerbi began hosting the Ninja Israel show on Channel 12.

In 2024, Gerbi competed in the 10th season of Israel's Rokdim Im Kokhavim ('Dancing with the Stars'), where she was eliminated 13th (out of 21 couples), in the second round of the live show stage.

== See also ==
- List of select Jewish judokas
- Sport in Israel
