= 2013 Judo Grand Prix Düsseldorf =

Judo competition 2013

Judo 2013 Judo Grand Prix Düsseldorf
- Location: Düsseldorf, Germany
- Dates: 23–24 February 2013
- Competitors: 357 from 45 nations

Competition at external databases
- Links: IJF • EJU • JudoInside

The 2013 Judo Grand Prix Düsseldorf was held in Düsseldorf, Germany from 23 to 24 February 2013.

== Medal summary ==
=== Men's events ===
Event	Gold	Silver	Bronze
Extra-lightweight (−60 kg)	Ganbatyn Boldbaatar (MGL)	Diego Dos Santos (BRA)	Aram Grigoryan (RUS)
Extra-lightweight (−60 kg)	Ganbatyn Boldbaatar (MGL)	Diego Dos Santos (BRA)	Amiran Papinashvili (GEO)
Half-lightweight (−66 kg)	Masashi Ebinuma (JPN)	Masaaki Fukuoka (JPN)	Shalva Kardava (GEO)
Half-lightweight (−66 kg)	Masashi Ebinuma (JPN)	Masaaki Fukuoka (JPN)	Golan Pollack (ISR)
Lightweight (−73 kg)	Pierre Duprat (FRA)	Dex Elmont (NED)	Wang Ki-chun (KOR)
Lightweight (−73 kg)	Pierre Duprat (FRA)	Dex Elmont (NED)	Rok Drakšič (SLO)
Half-middleweight (−81 kg)	Avtandili Tchrikishvili (GEO)	Levan Tsiklauri (GEO)	Kim Jae-bum (KOR)
Half-middleweight (−81 kg)	Avtandili Tchrikishvili (GEO)	Levan Tsiklauri (GEO)	Antoine Valois-Fortier (CAN)
Middleweight (−90 kg)	Varlam Liparteliani (GEO)	Tiago Camilo (BRA)	Zviad Gogotchuri (GEO)
Middleweight (−90 kg)	Varlam Liparteliani (GEO)	Tiago Camilo (BRA)	Ilias Iliadis (GRE)
Half-heavyweight (−100 kg)	Cyrille Maret (FRA)	Takashi Ono (JPN)	Kim Kyeong-tae (KOR)
Half-heavyweight (−100 kg)	Cyrille Maret (FRA)	Takashi Ono (JPN)	Martin Pacek (SWE)
Heavyweight (+100 kg)	Masaru Momose (JPN)	Adam Okruashvili (GEO)	David Moura (BRA)
Heavyweight (+100 kg)	Masaru Momose (JPN)	Adam Okruashvili (GEO)	Magomed Nazhmudinov (RUS)

=== Women's events ===
Event	Gold	Silver	Bronze
Extra-lightweight (−48 kg)	Riho Okamoto (JPN)	Jeong Bo-kyeong (KOR)	Hela Ayari (TUN)
Extra-lightweight (−48 kg)	Riho Okamoto (JPN)	Jeong Bo-kyeong (KOR)	Emi Yamagishi (JPN)
Half-lightweight (−52 kg)	Majlinda Kelmendi (KOS)	Andreea Chițu (ROU)	Mareen Kräh (GER)
Half-lightweight (−52 kg)	Majlinda Kelmendi (KOS)	Andreea Chițu (ROU)	Nodoka Tanimoto (JPN)
Lightweight (−57 kg)	Automne Pavia (FRA)	Nozomi Hirai (JPN)	Megumi Ishikawa (JPN)
Lightweight (−57 kg)	Automne Pavia (FRA)	Nozomi Hirai (JPN)	Kim Jan-di (KOR)
Half-middleweight (−63 kg)	Clarisse Agbegnenou (FRA)	Kana Abe (JPN)	Yarden Gerbi (ISR)
Half-middleweight (−63 kg)	Clarisse Agbegnenou (FRA)	Kana Abe (JPN)	Anicka van Emden (NED)
Middleweight (−70 kg)	Kim Polling (NED)	Laura Vargas Koch (GER)	Kim Seong-yeon (KOR)
Middleweight (−70 kg)	Kim Polling (NED)	Laura Vargas Koch (GER)	Juliane Robra (SUI)
Half-heavyweight (−78 kg)	Gemma Gibbons (GBR)	Ruika Sato (JPN)	Marhinde Verkerk (NED)
Half-heavyweight (−78 kg)	Gemma Gibbons (GBR)	Ruika Sato (JPN)	Lucie Louette (FRA)
Heavyweight (+78 kg)	Maria Suelen Altheman (BRA)	Émilie Andéol (FRA)	Kanae Yamabe (JPN)
Heavyweight (+78 kg)	Maria Suelen Altheman (BRA)	Émilie Andéol (FRA)	Franziska Konitz (GER)

Source Results

=== Medal table ===
* Host nation (Germany)

Rank	Nation	Gold	Silver	Bronze	Total
1	France (FRA)	4	1	1	6
2	Japan (JPN)	3	5	4	12
3	Georgia (GEO)	2	2	3	7
4	Brazil (BRA)	1	2	1	4
5	Netherlands (NED)	1	1	2	4
6	Great Britain (GBR)	1	0	0	1
6	Kosovo (KOS)	1	0	0	1
6	Mongolia (MGL)	1	0	0	1
9	South Korea (KOR)	0	1	5	6
10	Germany (GER)*	0	1	2	3
11	Romania (ROU)	0	1	0	1
12	Israel (ISR)	0	0	2	2
12	Russia (RUS)	0	0	2	2
14	Canada (CAN)	0	0	1	1
14	Greece (GRE)	0	0	1	1
14	Slovenia (SLO)	0	0	1	1
14	Sweden (SWE)	0	0	1	1
14	Switzerland (SUI)	0	0	1	1
14	Tunisia (TUN)	0	0	1	1
Totals (19 entries)		14	14	28	56
