= 2013 World Judo Championships =

Judo competition

Judo 2013 World Judo Championships
- Venue: Ginásio do Maracanãzinho
- Location: Rio de Janeiro, Brazil
- Dates: 26 August – 1 September
- Competitors: 673 from 123 nations

Champions
- Men's team: Georgia (3rd title)
- Women's team: Japan (4th title)

Competition at external databases
- Links: IJF • EJU • JudoInside

The 2013 World Judo Championships were held at the Ginásio do Maracanãzinho in Rio de Janeiro, Brazil from 26 August to 1 September.

== Schedule ==
All times are local (UTC−3).

Event date	Starting time	Event details
26 August	10:00	Men −60 kg
26 August	10:00	Women −48 kg
27 August	10:00	Men −66 kg
27 August	10:00	Women −52 kg
28 August	10:00	Men −73 kg
28 August	10:00	Women −57 kg
29 August	10:00	Men −81 kg
29 August	10:00	Women −63 kg
30 August	09:00	Men −90 kg
30 August	09:00	Women −70 kg
30 August	09:00	Women −78 kg
31 August	09:00	Men −100 kg
31 August	09:00	Men +100 kg
31 August	09:00	Women +78 kg
1 September	09:00	Men team
1 September	09:00	Women team

== Medal summary ==
=== Medal table ===
* Host nation (Brazil)

Rank	Nation	Gold	Silver	Bronze	Total
1	Japan	4	1	4	9
2	France	2	2	4	8
3	Cuba	2	0	1	3
4	Brazil*	1	4	2	7
5	Georgia	1	2	0	3
6	Mongolia	1	1	0	2
7	Azerbaijan	1	0	1	2
8	Colombia	1	0	0	1
8	Israel	1	0	0	1
8	Kosovo	1	0	0	1
8	North Korea	1	0	0	1
12	Netherlands	0	2	3	5
13	Germany	0	1	5	6
14	Russia	0	1	2	3
15	Kazakhstan	0	1	0	1
15	United States	0	1	0	1
17	South Korea	0	0	3	3
18	Belgium	0	0	2	2
19	Czech Republic	0	0	1	1
19	Greece	0	0	1	1
19	Slovenia	0	0	1	1
19	Tunisia	0	0	1	1
19	Ukraine	0	0	1	1
Totals (23 entries)		16	16	32	64

=== Men's events ===
Event	Gold	Silver	Bronze
Extra-lightweight (60 kg)	Naohisa Takato; Japan	Dashdavaagiin Amartüvshin; Mongolia	Kim Won-Jin; South Korea
Extra-lightweight (60 kg)	Naohisa Takato; Japan	Dashdavaagiin Amartüvshin; Mongolia	Orkhan Safarov; Azerbaijan
Half-lightweight (66 kg)	Masashi Ebinuma; Japan	Azamat Mukanov; Kazakhstan	Masaaki Fukuoka; Japan
Half-lightweight (66 kg)	Masashi Ebinuma; Japan	Azamat Mukanov; Kazakhstan	Georgii Zantaraia; Ukraine
Lightweight (73 kg)	Shohei Ono; Japan	Ugo Legrand; France	Dirk Van Tichelt; Belgium
Lightweight (73 kg)	Shohei Ono; Japan	Ugo Legrand; France	Dex Elmont; Netherlands
Half-middleweight (81 kg)	Loïc Pietri; France	Avtandil Tchrikishvili; Georgia	Ivan Vorobev; Russia
Half-middleweight (81 kg)	Loïc Pietri; France	Avtandil Tchrikishvili; Georgia	Alain Schmitt; France
Middleweight (90 kg)	Asley González; Cuba	Varlam Liparteliani; Georgia	Ilias Iliadis; Greece
Middleweight (90 kg)	Asley González; Cuba	Varlam Liparteliani; Georgia	Kirill Denisov; Russia
Half-heavyweight (100 kg)	Elkhan Mammadov; Azerbaijan	Henk Grol; Netherlands	Lukáš Krpálek; Czech Republic
Half-heavyweight (100 kg)	Elkhan Mammadov; Azerbaijan	Henk Grol; Netherlands	Dimitri Peters; Germany
Heavyweight (+100 kg)	Teddy Riner; France	Rafael Silva; Brazil	Faicel Jaballah; Tunisia
Heavyweight (+100 kg)	Teddy Riner; France	Rafael Silva; Brazil	Andreas Tölzer; Germany
Team	Georgia; Lasha Shavdatuashvili; Amiran Papinashvili; Zebeda Rekhviashvili; Avtandil Tchrikishvili; Varlam Liparteliani; Adam Okruashvili	Russia; Alim Gadanov; Denis Yartsev; Murat Kodzokov; Sirazhudin Magomedov; Ivan Nifontov; Kirill Denisov; Yuri Panasenkov; Alexander Mikhaylin; Renat Saidov	Japan; Masaaki Fukuoka; Shohei Ono; Keita Nagashima; Masashi Nishiyama; Ryu Shichinohe
Team	Georgia; Lasha Shavdatuashvili; Amiran Papinashvili; Zebeda Rekhviashvili; Avtandil Tchrikishvili; Varlam Liparteliani; Adam Okruashvili	Russia; Alim Gadanov; Denis Yartsev; Murat Kodzokov; Sirazhudin Magomedov; Ivan Nifontov; Kirill Denisov; Yuri Panasenkov; Alexander Mikhaylin; Renat Saidov	Germany; Sebastian Seidl; Tobias Englmaier; Igor Wandtke; Sven Maresch; Marc Odenthal; Dimitri Peters

=== Women's events ===
Event	Gold	Silver	Bronze
Extra-lightweight (48 kg)	Mönkhbatyn Urantsetseg; Mongolia	Haruna Asami; Japan	Charline Van Snick; Belgium
Extra-lightweight (48 kg)	Mönkhbatyn Urantsetseg; Mongolia	Haruna Asami; Japan	Sarah Menezes; Brazil
Half-lightweight (52 kg)	Majlinda Kelmendi; Kosovo	Érika Miranda; Brazil	Mareen Kräh; Germany
Half-lightweight (52 kg)	Majlinda Kelmendi; Kosovo	Érika Miranda; Brazil	Yuki Hashimoto; Japan
Lightweight (57 kg)	Rafaela Silva; Brazil	Marti Malloy; United States	Vlora Bedeti; Slovenia
Lightweight (57 kg)	Rafaela Silva; Brazil	Marti Malloy; United States	Miryam Roper; Germany
Half-middleweight (63 kg)	Yarden Gerbi; Israel	Clarisse Agbegnenou; France	Gévrise Émane; France
Half-middleweight (63 kg)	Yarden Gerbi; Israel	Clarisse Agbegnenou; France	Anicka van Emden; Netherlands
Middleweight (70 kg)	Yuri Alvear; Colombia	Laura Vargas Koch; Germany	Kim Polling; Netherlands
Middleweight (70 kg)	Yuri Alvear; Colombia	Laura Vargas Koch; Germany	Kim Seong-Yeon; South Korea
Half-heavyweight (78 kg)	Sol Kyong; North Korea	Marhinde Verkerk; Netherlands	Mayra Aguiar; Brazil
Half-heavyweight (78 kg)	Sol Kyong; North Korea	Marhinde Verkerk; Netherlands	Audrey Tcheuméo; France
Heavyweight (+78 kg)	Idalys Ortiz; Cuba	Maria Suelen Altheman; Brazil	Megumi Tachimoto; Japan
Heavyweight (+78 kg)	Idalys Ortiz; Cuba	Maria Suelen Altheman; Brazil	Lee Jung-Eun; South Korea
Team	Japan; Yuki Hashimoto; Anzu Yamamoto; Kana Abe; Haruka Tachimoto; Megumi Tachimoto	Brazil; Érika Miranda; Rafaela Silva; Katherine Campos; Maria Portela; Mayra Aguiar; Maria Suelen Altheman; Mariana Silva	Cuba; Maria Celia Laborde; Yanet Bermoy; Maricet Espinosa; Onix Cortés Aldama; Idalys Ortiz
Team	Japan; Yuki Hashimoto; Anzu Yamamoto; Kana Abe; Haruka Tachimoto; Megumi Tachimoto	Brazil; Érika Miranda; Rafaela Silva; Katherine Campos; Maria Portela; Mayra Aguiar; Maria Suelen Altheman; Mariana Silva	France; Laëtitia Payet; Automne Pavia; Hélène Receveaux; Clarisse Agbegnenou; Gévrise Émane; Lucie Louette; Emilie Andeol
