= Judo at the 2016 Summer Olympics – Women's 63 kg =

Women's 63 kg at the Games of the XXXI Olympiad
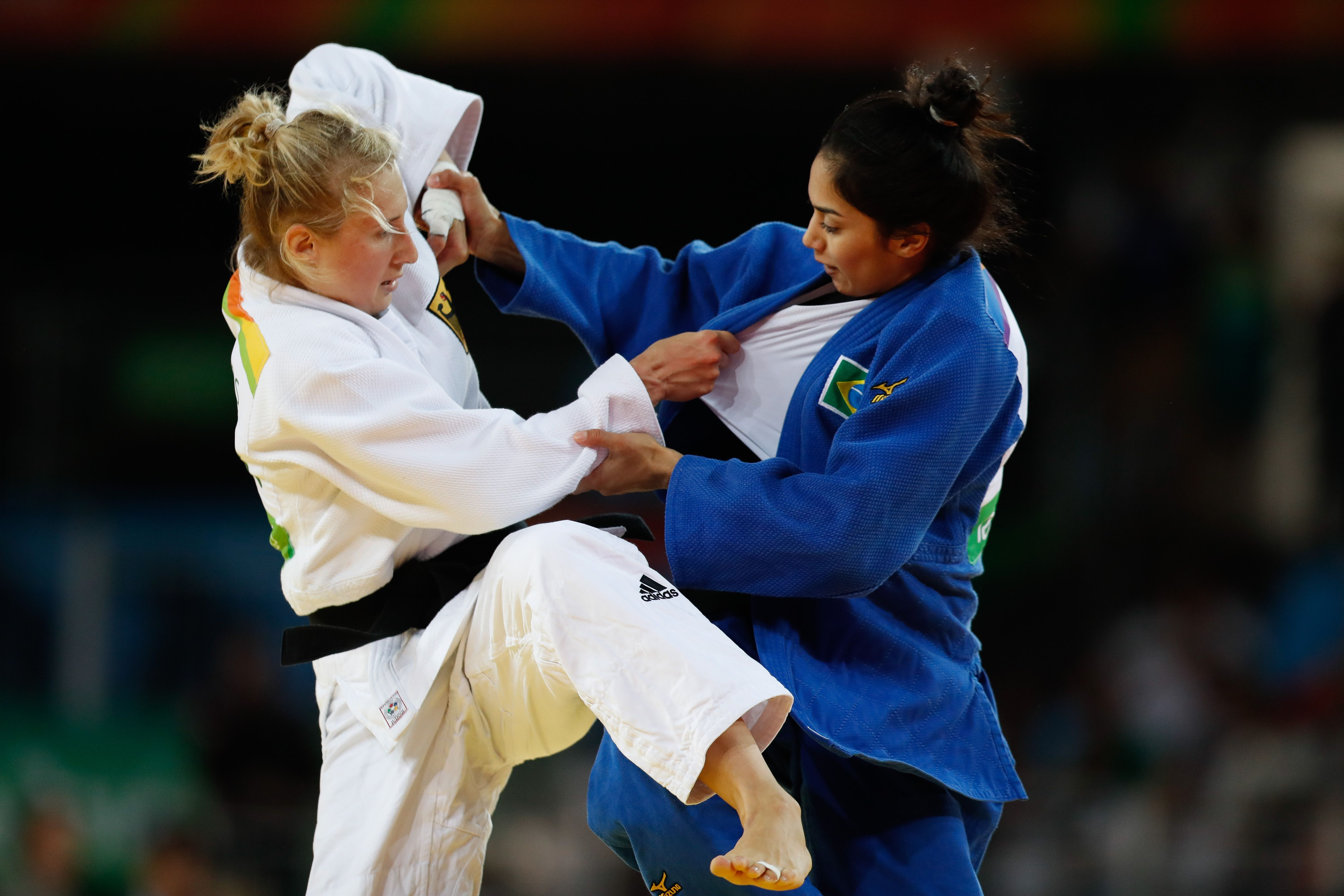
- Brazil's Mariana Silva faces Germany's Martyna Trajdos, during Pool B's second round.
- Venue: Carioca Arena 2
- Date: 9 August 2016
- Competitors: 26 from 26 nations

Medalists
| 1st place, gold medalist(s) | | Tina Trstenjak | Slovenia |
| 2nd place, silver medalist(s) | | Clarisse Agbegnenou | France |
| 3rd place, bronze medalist(s) | | Yarden Gerbi | Israel |
| 3rd place, bronze medalist(s) | | Anicka van Emden | Netherlands |

The women's 63 kg competition in judo at the 2016 Summer Olympics in Rio de Janeiro was held on 9 August at the Carioca Arena 2.

The gold and silver medals were determined by a single-elimination tournament, with the winner of the final taking gold and the loser receiving silver. Judo events awarded two bronze medals. Quarterfinal losers competed in a repechage match for the right to face a semifinal loser for a bronze medal (that is, the judokas defeated in quarterfinals A and B competed against each other, with the winner of that match facing the semifinal loser from the other half of the bracket).

The medals were presented by Alex Gilady, IOC member from Israel, and the gifts were presented by Mr. Habib Sissoko, member of the International Judo Federation Executive Committee.

== Results ==
=== Finals ===
Semi-finals
Tina Trstenjak (SLO) | 101
Mariana Silva (BRA) | 000
Clarisse Agbegnenou (FRA) | 000
Miku Tashiro (JPN) | 000

Final
Tina Trstenjak (SLO) | 101
Clarisse Agbegnenou (FRA) | 000

=== Repechages ===
| Repechage | | Bronze medal |
| Yang Junxia (CHN) | 000 |
| Yarden Gerbi (ISR) | 010 | Yarden Gerbi (ISR) | 011 |
| | | Miku Tashiro (JPN) | 000 |

| Repechage | | Bronze medal |
| Anicka van Emden (NED) | 001 |
| Kathrin Unterwurzacher (AUT) | 000 | Anicka van Emden (NED) | 001 |
| | | Mariana Silva (BRA) | 000 |

=== Pool A ===
| First round | | Second round | | Quarterfinals |
| | | Tina Trstenjak (SLO) | 001 |
| Edwige Gwend (ITA) | 101 | Edwige Gwend (ITA) | 000 |
| Mia Hermansson (SWE) | 000 | | | Tina Trstenjak (SLO) | 101 |
| Tsedevsürengiin Mönkhzayaa (MGL) | 101 | | | Yang Junxia (CHN) | 000 |
| Rizlen Zouak (MAR) | 000 | Tsedevsürengiin Mönkhzayaa (MGL) | 001 |
| Marian Urdabayeva (KAZ) | 000 | Yang Junxia (CHN) | 100 |
| Yang Junxia (CHN) | 100 |

=== Pool B ===
First round
Phupu Lhamu Khatri (NEP) | 000
Maricet Espinosa (CUB) | 011
Szandra Szögedi (GHA) | 000
Mariana Silva (BRA) | 100

Second round
Yarden Gerbi (ISR) | 100
Maricet Espinosa (CUB) | 001
Martyna Trajdos (GER) | 000
Mariana Silva (BRA) | 001

Quarterfinals
Yarden Gerbi (ISR) | 000
Mariana Silva (BRA) | 001

=== Pool C ===
| First round | | Second round | | Quarterfinals |
| | | Clarisse Agbegnenou (FRA) | 102 |
| Büşra Katipoğlu (TUR) | 001 | Büşra Katipoğlu (TUR) | 000 |
| Katerina Nikoloska (MKD) | 000 | | | Clarisse Agbegnenou (FRA) | 101 |
| Anicka van Emden (NED) | 001 | | | Anicka van Emden (NED) | 000 |
| Ekaterina Valkova (RUS) | 000 | Anicka van Emden (NED) | 001 |
| Alice Schlesinger (GBR) | 100 | Alice Schlesinger (GBR) | 000 |
| Bak Ji-yun (KOR) | 000 |

=== Pool D ===
First round
Katharina Haecker (AUS) | 100
Laura Sallés (AND) | 000
Mamadama Bangoura (GUI) | 000
Estefania García (ECU) | 100

Second round
Miku Tashiro (JPN) | 111
Katharina Haecker (AUS) | 000
Kathrin Unterwurzacher (AUT) | 010
Estefania García (ECU) | 000

Quarterfinals
Miku Tashiro (JPN) | 001
Kathrin Unterwurzacher (AUT) | 000
