= Kana Abe =

Japanese judoka (born 1988)

Personal information
- Born: 25 April 1988 (age 38)
- Occupation: Judoka

Sport
- Country: Japan
- Sport: Judo
- Weight class: ‍–‍63 kg

Achievements and titles
- World Champ.: 5th (2013)
- Asian Champ.: (gold) (2014)
Medal record
Women's judo
Representing Japan
World Championships
Gold medal – first place	2013 Rio de Janeiro	Women's team
Asian Games
Gold medal – first place	2014 Incheon	Women's team
Bronze medal – third place	2014 Incheon	‍–‍63 kg
World Masters
Gold medal – first place	2013 Tyumen	‍–‍63 kg
IJF Grand Slam
Gold medal – first place	2011 Rio de Janeiro	‍–‍63 kg
Gold medal – first place	2013 Tokyo	‍–‍63 kg
Gold medal – first place	2014 Tyumen	‍–‍63 kg
Silver medal – second place	2012 Tokyo	‍–‍63 kg
Bronze medal – third place	2013 Paris	‍–‍63 kg
IJF Grand Prix
Silver medal – second place	2013 Düsseldorf	‍–‍63 kg
Bronze medal – third place	2014 Düsseldorf	‍–‍63 kg
Asian Junior Championships
Gold medal – first place	2006 Jeju	‍–‍70 kg

Profile at external databases
- IJF: 2492
- JudoInside.com: 42977
- Updated on 20 November 2022

Kana Abe (阿部 香菜, Abe Kana; born 25 April 1988) is a Japanese judoka.

At the 2013 World Judo Championships in Rio de Janeiro, Abe competed in the women's 63 kg category where she reached the semifinal and finished fifth. She was also part of the Japanese team that won gold in the women's team competition.

Abe married Asian and World Champion judoka Masashi Ebinuma in 2014.
