= 2015 Judo Grand Slam Tokyo =

Judo competition

Judo 2015 Judo Grand Slam Tokyo
- Venue: Tokyo Metropolitan Gymnasium, Tokyo
- Location: Tokyo, Japan
- Dates: 4–6 December 2015
- Competitors: 471 from 92 nations

Competition at external databases
- Links: IJF • EJU • JudoInside

The 2015 Judo Grand Slam was held in Tokyo, Japan, from 4 to 6 December 2015.

== Medal summary ==
=== Men's events ===
Event	Gold	Silver	Bronze
Extra-lightweight (−60 kg)	Naohisa Takato (JPN)	Beslan Mudranov (RUS)	Toru Shishime (JPN)
Extra-lightweight (−60 kg)	Naohisa Takato (JPN)	Beslan Mudranov (RUS)	Kim Won-jin (KOR)
Half-lightweight (−66 kg)	Tomofumi Takajo (JPN)	Masashi Ebinuma (JPN)	Kengo Takaichi (JPN)
Half-lightweight (−66 kg)	Tomofumi Takajo (JPN)	Masashi Ebinuma (JPN)	Davaadorjiin Tömörkhüleg (MGL)
Lightweight (−73 kg)	Hiroyuki Akimoto (JPN)	An Chang-rim (KOR)	Musa Mogushkov (RUS)
Lightweight (−73 kg)	Hiroyuki Akimoto (JPN)	An Chang-rim (KOR)	Nugzar Tatalashvili (GEO)
Half-middleweight (−81 kg)	Avtandili Tchrikishvili (GEO)	Lee Seung-su (KOR)	Takanori Nagase (JPN)
Half-middleweight (−81 kg)	Avtandili Tchrikishvili (GEO)	Lee Seung-su (KOR)	Wang Ki-chun (KOR)
Middleweight (−90 kg)	Mashu Baker (JPN)	Asley González (CUB)	Gwak Dong-han (KOR)
Middleweight (−90 kg)	Mashu Baker (JPN)	Asley González (CUB)	Daiki Nishiyama (JPN)
Half-heavyweight (−100 kg)	Ryunosuke Haga (JPN)	Cho Gu-ham (KOR)	Elmar Gasimov (AZE)
Half-heavyweight (−100 kg)	Ryunosuke Haga (JPN)	Cho Gu-ham (KOR)	Cyrille Maret (FRA)
Heavyweight (+100 kg)	Hisayoshi Harasawa (JPN)	Ryu Shichinohe (JPN)	Stanislav Bondarenko (UKR)
Heavyweight (+100 kg)	Hisayoshi Harasawa (JPN)	Ryu Shichinohe (JPN)	Daiki Kamikawa (JPN)

=== Women's events ===
Event	Gold	Silver	Bronze
Extra-lightweight (−48 kg)	Ami Kondo (JPN)	Haruna Asami (JPN)	Nataliya Kondratyeva (RUS)
Extra-lightweight (−48 kg)	Ami Kondo (JPN)	Haruna Asami (JPN)	Sarah Menezes (BRA)
Half-lightweight (−52 kg)	Misato Nakamura (JPN)	Ai Shishime (JPN)	Annabelle Euranie (FRA)
Half-lightweight (−52 kg)	Misato Nakamura (JPN)	Ai Shishime (JPN)	Yuki Hashimoto (JPN)
Lightweight (−57 kg)	Tsukasa Yoshida (JPN)	Hélène Receveaux (FRA)	Hedvig Karakas (HUN)
Lightweight (−57 kg)	Tsukasa Yoshida (JPN)	Hélène Receveaux (FRA)	Dorjsürengiin Sumiyaa (MGL)
Half-middleweight (−63 kg)	Martyna Trajdos (GER)	Tina Trstenjak (SLO)	Miku Tashiro (JPN)
Half-middleweight (−63 kg)	Martyna Trajdos (GER)	Tina Trstenjak (SLO)	Ekaterina Valkova (RUS)
Middleweight (−70 kg)	Chizuru Arai (JPN)	Yoko Ono (JPN)	Linda Bolder (ISR)
Middleweight (−70 kg)	Chizuru Arai (JPN)	Yoko Ono (JPN)	Maria Portela (BRA)
Half-heavyweight (−78 kg)	Kayla Harrison (USA)	Guusje Steenhuis (NED)	Gemma Gibbons (GBR)
Half-heavyweight (−78 kg)	Kayla Harrison (USA)	Guusje Steenhuis (NED)	Anamari Velenšek (SLO)
Heavyweight (+78 kg)	Nami Inamori (JPN)	Idalys Ortiz (CUB)	Émilie Andéol (FRA)
Heavyweight (+78 kg)	Nami Inamori (JPN)	Idalys Ortiz (CUB)	Iryna Kindzerska (UKR)

Source Results

=== Medal table ===
* Host nation (Japan)

Rank	Nation	Gold	Silver	Bronze	Total
1	Japan (JPN)*	11	5	7	23
2	Georgia (GEO)	1	0	1	2
3	Germany (GER)	1	0	0	1
3	United States (USA)	1	0	0	1
5	South Korea (KOR)	0	3	3	6
6	Cuba (CUB)	0	2	0	2
7	France (FRA)	0	1	3	4
7	Russia (RUS)	0	1	3	4
9	Slovenia (SLO)	0	1	1	2
10	Netherlands (NED)	0	1	0	1
11	Brazil (BRA)	0	0	2	2
11	Mongolia (MGL)	0	0	2	2
11	Ukraine (UKR)	0	0	2	2
14	Azerbaijan (AZE)	0	0	1	1
14	Great Britain (GBR)	0	0	1	1
14	Hungary (HUN)	0	0	1	1
14	Israel (ISR)	0	0	1	1
Totals (17 entries)		14	14	28	56
