= Clarisse Agbegnenou =

French judoka (born 1992)

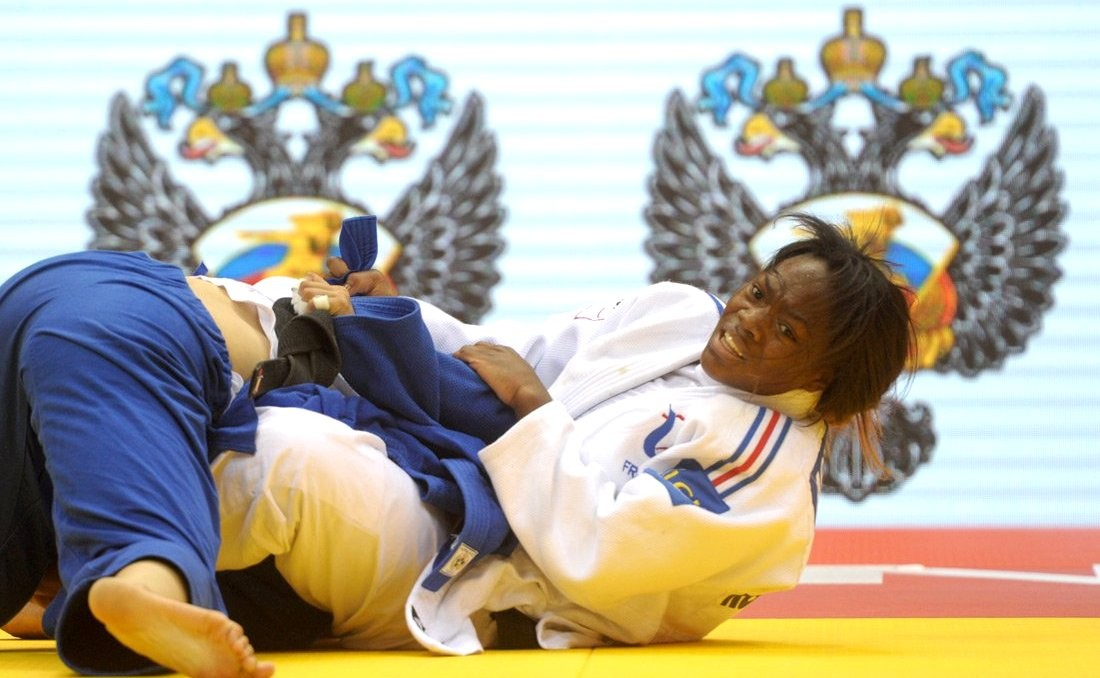
- Agbegnenou at the 2014 World Championships

Personal information
- Full name: Clarisse Bogdanna Agbegnenou
- Born: 25 October 1992 (age 34) Rennes, France
- Occupation: Judoka
- Height: 164 cm (5 ft 5 in)

Sport
- Country: France
- Sport: Judo
- Weight class: ‍–‍63 kg
- Club: Judo Club Escales of Argenteuil
- Coached by: Ahcène Goudjil (club); Larbi Benboudaoud (national)

Achievements and titles
- Olympic Games: (gold) (2020)
- World Champ.: (gold) (2014, 2017, 2018, 2019, 2021, 2023)
- European Champ.: (gold) (2013, 2014, 2018, 2019, 2020)
- Highest world ranking: 1^{st}
Medal record
Women's judo
Representing France
International judo competitions
Event	1st	2nd	3rd
Olympic Games	3	1	1
World Championships	6	2	1
European Championships	5	0	2
Total	14	3	4
Olympic Games
Gold medal – first place	2020 Tokyo	‍–‍63 kg
Gold medal – first place	2020 Tokyo	Mixed team
Gold medal – first place	2024 Paris	Mixed team
Silver medal – second place	2016 Rio de Janeiro	‍–‍63 kg
Bronze medal – third place	2024 Paris	‍–‍63 kg
World Championships
Gold medal – first place	2011 Paris	Women's team
Gold medal – first place	2014 Chelyabinsk	‍–‍63 kg
Gold medal – first place	2014 Chelyabinsk	Women's team
Gold medal – first place	2017 Budapest	‍–‍63 kg
Gold medal – first place	2018 Baku	‍–‍63 kg
Gold medal – first place	2019 Tokyo	‍–‍63 kg
Gold medal – first place	2021 Budapest	‍–‍63 kg
Gold medal – first place	2023 Doha	‍–‍63 kg
Silver medal – second place	2013 Rio de Janeiro	‍–‍63 kg
Silver medal – second place	2015 Astana	‍–‍63 kg
Silver medal – second place	2018 Baku	Mixed team
Bronze medal – third place	2013 Rio de Janeiro	Women's team
Bronze medal – third place	2017 Budapest	Mixed team
Bronze medal – third place	2024 Abu Dhabi	‍–‍63 kg
European Games
Gold medal – first place	2019 Minsk	‍–‍63 kg
Gold medal – first place	2015 Baku	Women's team
Bronze medal – third place	2015 Baku	‍–‍63 kg
European Championships
Gold medal – first place	2013 Budapest	‍–‍63 kg
Gold medal – first place	2014 Montpellier	‍–‍63 kg
Gold medal – first place	2014 Montpellier	Women's team
Gold medal – first place	2018 Tel Aviv	‍–‍63 kg
Gold medal – first place	2020 Prague	‍–‍63 kg
Silver medal – second place	2012 Chelyabinsk	Women's team
Silver medal – second place	2013 Budapest	Women's team
Silver medal – second place	2025 Podgorica	‍–‍63 kg
Bronze medal – third place	2012 Chelyabinsk	‍–‍63 kg
World Masters
Gold medal – first place	2018 Guangzhou	‍–‍63 kg
Gold medal – first place	2021 Doha	‍–‍63 kg
Silver medal – second place	2019 Qingdao	‍–‍63 kg
Bronze medal – third place	2017 Saint Petersburg	‍–‍63 kg
Bronze medal – third place	2023 Budapest	‍–‍63 kg
IJF Grand Slam
Gold medal – first place	2010 Tokyo	‍–‍63 kg
Gold medal – first place	2013 Paris	‍–‍63 kg
Gold medal – first place	2014 Paris	‍–‍63 kg
Gold medal – first place	2015 Abu Dhabi	‍–‍63 kg
Gold medal – first place	2016 Paris	‍–‍63 kg
Gold medal – first place	2018 Paris	‍–‍63 kg
Gold medal – first place	2019 Paris	‍–‍63 kg
Gold medal – first place	2020 Paris	‍–‍63 kg
Gold medal – first place	2024 Paris	‍–‍63 kg
Gold medal – first place	2024 Tashkent	‍–‍63 kg
Silver medal – second place	2017 Paris	‍–‍63 kg
Bronze medal – third place	2011 Paris	‍–‍63 kg
Bronze medal – third place	2025 Tbilisi	‍–‍63 kg
Bronze medal – third place	2026 Lausanne	‍–‍63 kg
IJF Grand Prix
Gold medal – first place	2011 Abu Dhabi	‍–‍63 kg
Gold medal – first place	2013 Düsseldorf	‍–‍63 kg
Gold medal – first place	2013 Miami	‍–‍63 kg
Gold medal – first place	2014 Havana	‍–‍63 kg
Gold medal – first place	2014 Jeju	‍–‍63 kg
Gold medal – first place	2015 Jeju	‍–‍63 kg
Gold medal – first place	2017 Düsseldorf	‍–‍63 kg
Gold medal – first place	2018 Tbilisi	‍–‍63 kg
Silver medal – second place	2010 Abu Dhabi	‍–‍63 kg
Silver medal – second place	2012 Düsseldorf	‍–‍63 kg
Silver medal – second place	2013 Abu Dhabi	‍–‍63 kg
Silver medal – second place	2015 Zagreb	‍–‍63 kg
World Juniors Championships
Bronze medal – third place	2011 Cape Town	‍–‍63 kg
European Cadet Championships
Gold medal – first place	2008 Sarajevo	‍–‍57 kg

Profile at external databases
- IJF: 2317
- JudoInside.com: 49973
- Updated on 1 September 2026

Clarisse Bogdanna Agbegnenou (born 25 October 1992) is a French judoka. Competing in the −63 kg weight division she won the European title in 2013, the world title in 2014, an Olympic silver medal at the Rio 2016 Games, an Olympic gold medal at the Tokyo 2020 Games, and the bronze medal at the 2024 Games in Paris, in her home country.

== Early life ==
Agbegnenou was born to Togolese parents; she holds a dual citizenship and maintains strong ties to both countries.

She graduated from HEC Paris.

== Sporting career ==
A member of Arts Martiaux d'Asnières, she was European junior champion and French vice-champion in the under 57 kg category in 2008, then French junior champion in the under 63 kg category in 2009, before entering INSEP. She joined the Judo Club Escales Argenteuil that same year, at the age of 16 and a half, and worked with the club's founding president, high-level coach Ahcène Goudjil.

In 2013, she won her first international gold medal, beating Russia's Marta Labazina at the European Judo Championships. In 2014, she defeated Israel's Yarden Gerbi by ippon to become world champion in under 63 kg.

Following a brawl involving her (and other judoka, who were acquitted) for violence committed at the INSEP against Anne-Fatoumata M'Bairo on 12 April 2013, she was sentenced by the Federation to a one-year suspended competition ban (three months for Priscilla Gneto, Madeleine Malonga, Fanny Posvite and Linsay Tsang Sam Moi), then in July 2014 by the courts to 70 hours of community service and a fine of 2,780 euros.

She became Olympic vice-champion, winning the silver medal in the under 63 kg category at the 2016 Olympic Games in Rio de Janeiro, losing in the final to Slovenia's Tina Trstenjak. After the Games, she joined the Red Star Club (RSC) de Champigny-sur-Marne.

A few months later, on 1 September 2017, she was crowned world champion in the under 63 kg category in Budapest, defeating Slovenia's Tina Trstenjak, who had beaten her in the final of the Olympic Games a year earlier.

=== 2018 ===
At the 2018 European Judo Championships in Tel Aviv, she wins the European under 63 kg crown against Slovenia's Tina Trstenjak, beating the latter by waza-ari after seven minutes of combat.

On 23 September 2018, at the World Championships in Baku, she defeated Japan's Miku Tashiro by ippon on the Golden Score to become world champion under 63 kg for the third time. At the World Judo Masters in Canton, she defeats Japan's Nami Nabekura in the final, remaining unbeaten throughout the 2018 season. In December, she is voted L'Équipe 2018 Champion of Champions along with Kevin Mayer.

=== 2019 : Fourth European title and fourth world title ===
Nippon Budokan where Clarisse Agbégnénou earned her fourth world title and her two Olympic titles at the Tokyo 2020 Olympic Games. On 6 June 2019 she was named flag-bearer for the French delegation at the 2019 European Games in Minsk.

In the judo competitions, she won a fourth continental title, defeating Britain's Alice Schlesinger in the final. On 28 August 2019 Clarisse Agbégnénou became world champion for the fourth time at the Nippon Budokan, Tokyo's legendary martial arts and concert hall, beating Japan's Miku Tashiro by a golden score after a particularly remarkable eleven-minute bout.

She thus became the most successful French judoka in history, ahead of Lucie Décosse, Gévrise Émane and Brigitte Deydier, who each have three world titles, and remains unbeaten since December 2017.

At the end of December, she again won L'Équipe's Champion of Champions trophy, alongside Julian Alaphilippe.

=== 2020: Fifth European title ===
The only title she lacks in 2020 is Olympic gold, which should have been at stake again on the tatami of the same Nippon Budokan in 2020 (but these Olympic Games were postponed due to the Covid-19 Pandemic).

She won a fifth European title at the 2020 European Judo Championships in Prague.

=== 2021: Fifth world title and two Olympic gold medals ===
She won a fifth world title on 9 June 2021, at the 2021 World Judo Championships in Budapest, where she won all five of her bouts by ippon (for the fourth consecutive time), triumphing in the final over Slovenia's Andreja Leški.

On 5 July 2021 she was named flag-bearer for the French delegation to the 2020 Summer Olympics by the CNOSF, along with gymnast Samir Aït Saïd.

On 27 July 2021, four days after leading her delegation in the opening ceremony, she took her revenge in the final against Slovenia's Tina Trstenjak, who had beaten her at the Rio Games. After 37 seconds in the Golden score, and thanks to a sweep that gave her Waza-ari, she won the gold medal at the Tokyo 2020 32 Olympic Games. Four days later, she won mixed team gold with Romane Dicko, Axel Clerget, Sarah-Léonie Cysique, Guillaume Chaine and Teddy Riner, after beating the Japanese team 4-1 in the final.

== Medals ==
=== Olympics ===
- (gold) Gold Medal at the 2020 Summer Olympics in Tokyo
- (silver) Silver Medal at the 2016 Summer Olympics in Rio de Janeiro
- (bronze) Bronze Medal at the 2024 Summer Olympics in Paris

=== World Championships ===
- (gold) Gold Medal at the 2023 World Championships in Doha.
- (gold) Gold Medal at the 2021 World Championships in Budapest.
- (gold) Gold Medal at the 2019 World Championships in Tokyo.
- (gold) Gold Medal at the 2018 World Championships in Baku.
- (gold) Gold Medal at the 2017 World Championships in Budapest.
- (gold) Gold Medal at the 2014 World Championships in Chelyabinsk.
- (silver) Silver Medal at the 2013 World Championships in Rio de Janeiro.
- (silver) Silver Medal at the 2015 World Championships in Astana.
- (gold) Team Gold Medal at the 2011 World Championships in Paris.
- (bronze) Bronze Medal at the 2011 Junior World Championships.

=== European Championships ===
- (gold) Gold Medal at the 2020 European Championships in Prague.
- (gold) Gold Medal at the 2019 European Championships in Minsk.
- (gold) Gold Medal at the 2018 European Championships in Tel Aviv.
- (gold) 2008 European Cadet Champion
- (bronze) Bronze Medal at the 2012 European Championships in Chelyabinsk.
- (silver) Team Silver Medal at the 2012 European Championships in Chelyabinsk.
- (gold) Gold Medal at the 2013 European Championships in Budapest.

=== National French Championships ===
- (gold) Gold Medal at the 2012 National French Championships.
- (gold) Gold Medal at the 2010 National French Championships.
- (gold) Gold Medal at the 2009 National French Championships.

=== Miscellaneous ===
- (gold) Gold Medal at the 2020 Paris Grand Slam.
- (gold) Gold Medal at the 2019 Paris Grand Slam.
- (gold) Gold Medal at the 2018 Guangzhou World Masters.
- (gold) Gold Medal at the 2018 Paris Grand Slam.
- (gold) Gold Medal at the 2016 Paris Grand Slam.
- (gold) Gold Medal at the 2014 Paris Grand Slam.
- (gold) Gold Medal at the 2013 Paris Grand Slam.
- (gold) Gold Medal at the 2010 Tokyo Grand Slam.
- (gold) Gold Medal at the 2011 Abu Dhabi Grand Prix.
- (silver) Silver Medal at the 2019 Qingdao World Masters.
- (silver) Silver Medal at the 2012 Düsseldorf Grand Prix.
- (silver) Silver Medal at the 2010 Abu Dhabi Grand Prix.

Awards and achievements
Preceded by Tessa Worley	French Sportswoman of the Year; 2018, 2019	Succeeded by Pauline Ferrand-Prévot
Preceded by Pauline Ferrand-Prévot	French Sportswoman of the Year; 2021	Succeeded by Caroline Garcia
Olympic Games
Preceded by Teddy Riner	Flagbearer for France (with Samir Aït Saïd); Tokyo 2020	Succeeded by Mélina Robert-Michon; Florent Manaudou
