= 2008 European Junior Judo Championships =

Judo competition

Judo 2008 European Junior Judo Championships
- Location: Warsaw, Poland
- Dates: 12–14 September 2008

Competition at external databases
- Links: EJU • JudoInside

The 2008 European Junior Judo Championships is an edition of the European Junior Judo Championships, organised by the European Judo Union.It was held in Warsaw, Poland from 12 to 14 September 2008.

== Medal summary ==
=== Medal table ===
* Host nation (Poland)

Rank	Nation	Gold	Silver	Bronze	Total
1	France (FRA)	3	2	1	6
2	Poland (POL)*	3	0	2	5
3	Netherlands (NED)	2	1	3	6
4	Russia (RUS)	2	1	2	5
5	Hungary (HUN)	1	4	1	6
6	Ukraine (UKR)	1	2	3	6
7	Georgia (GEO)	1	0	1	2
8	Czech Republic (CZE)	1	0	0	1
8	Slovenia (SLO)	1	0	0	1
8	Spain (ESP)	1	0	0	1
11	Germany (GER)	0	1	3	4
12	Italy (ITA)	0	1	1	2
12	Switzerland (SUI)	0	1	1	2
12	Turkey (TUR)	0	1	1	2
15	Armenia (ARM)	0	1	0	1
15	Belarus (BLR)	0	1	0	1
17	Azerbaijan (AZE)	0	0	3	3
17	Great Britain (GBR)	0	0	3	3
19	Belgium (BEL)	0	0	2	2
20	Croatia (CRO)	0	0	1	1
20	Estonia (EST)	0	0	1	1
20	Greece (GRE)	0	0	1	1
20	Israel (ISR)	0	0	1	1
20	Romania (ROU)	0	0	1	1
Totals (24 entries)		16	16	32	64

=== Men's events ===
Event	Gold	Silver	Bronze
−55 kg	Ervand Mgdsyan (RUS)	Valentin Rota (SUI)	Giorgi Brolashvili (GEO)
−55 kg	Ervand Mgdsyan (RUS)	Valentin Rota (SUI)	Elsever Sadigzade (AZE)
−60 kg	Pierre Duprat (FRA)	Dzheykhun Eiyubov (RUS)	Robert Kopiske (GER)
−60 kg	Pierre Duprat (FRA)	Dzheykhun Eiyubov (RUS)	Tibor Májer (HUN)
−66 kg	Ugo Legrand (FRA)	Bence Zámbori (HUN)	René Schneider (GER)
−66 kg	Ugo Legrand (FRA)	Bence Zámbori (HUN)	Sarkhan Ahmadov (AZE)
−73 kg	Piotr Kurkiewicz (POL)	Artyom Baghdasaryan (ARM)	Joachim Bottieau (BEL)
−73 kg	Piotr Kurkiewicz (POL)	Artyom Baghdasaryan (ARM)	Benji Nortan (NED)
−81 kg	Artem Vasylenko (UKR)	Faruch Bulekulov (GER)	Ramin Gurbanov (AZE)
−81 kg	Artem Vasylenko (UKR)	Faruch Bulekulov (GER)	Georgi Ladogin (EST)
−90 kg	Varlam Liparteliani (GEO)	Pablo Tomasetti (ITA)	Marvin De la Croes (NED)
−90 kg	Varlam Liparteliani (GEO)	Pablo Tomasetti (ITA)	Dmitry Saveliev (RUS)
−100 kg	Lukáš Krpálek (CZE)	Marvin Huisman (NED)	Rafal Filek (POL)
−100 kg	Lukáš Krpálek (CZE)	Marvin Huisman (NED)	Filip Ivanow (RUS)
+100 kg	Sergei Prokin (RUS)	Mykhaylo Blinov (UKR)	Michail Alexiadis (GRE)
+100 kg	Sergei Prokin (RUS)	Mykhaylo Blinov (UKR)	André Breitbarth (GER)

=== Women's events ===
Event	Gold	Silver	Bronze
−44 kg	Kristina Vrsic (SLO)	Lilla Erdelyi (HUN)	Esma Dademir (TUR)
−44 kg	Kristina Vrsic (SLO)	Lilla Erdelyi (HUN)	Violeta Dumitru (ROU)
−48 kg	Ewa Konieczny (POL)	Derya Cıbır (TUR)	Kelly Edwards (GBR)
−48 kg	Ewa Konieczny (POL)	Derya Cıbır (TUR)	Charline Van Snick (BEL)
−52 kg	Marta Kuban (POL)	Lola Benarroche (FRA)	Maureen Groefsema (NED)
−52 kg	Marta Kuban (POL)	Lola Benarroche (FRA)	Shushana Hevondian (UKR)
−57 kg	Juul Franssen (NED)	Hedvig Karakas (HUN)	Gemma Howell (GBR)
−57 kg	Juul Franssen (NED)	Hedvig Karakas (HUN)	Lyudmyla Marchenko (UKR)
−63 kg	Antoinette Hennink (NED)	Eszter Gáspár (HUN)	Yarden Gerbi (ISR)
−63 kg	Antoinette Hennink (NED)	Eszter Gáspár (HUN)	Edwige Gwend (ITA)
−70 kg	Abigél Joó (HUN)	Jessy Florentin (FRA)	Marija Cosic Zgalin (CRO)
−70 kg	Abigél Joó (HUN)	Jessy Florentin (FRA)	Luiza Gainutdinova (UKR)
−78 kg	Audrey Tcheuméo (FRA)	Ivanna Makukha (UKR)	Nadia Campestrin (SUI)
−78 kg	Audrey Tcheuméo (FRA)	Ivanna Makukha (UKR)	Katarzyna Furmanek (POL)
+78 kg	Sara Alvarez Folgueira (ESP)	Maryna Slutskaya (BLR)	Ashley Fleming (GBR)
+78 kg	Sara Alvarez Folgueira (ESP)	Maryna Slutskaya (BLR)	Aurore Quintin (FRA)

Source Results
