= 2011 World Judo Championships – Women's team =

Judo competition

Judo Women's team at the 2011 World Judo Championships
- Venue: Accor Arena
- Location: Paris, France
- Date: 28 August

Medalists
gold medal	France (2nd title)
silver medal	Japan
bronze medal	Germany
bronze medal	Cuba

Competition at external databases
- Links: EJU • JudoInside

The women's team competition of the 2011 World Judo Championships was held on August 28 at Palais Omnisports de Paris-Bercy in Paris. Each team consists of five competitors, one each from the –52, –57, –63, –70 and +70 kg categories.

== Medalists ==
Gold	Silver	Bronze
France	Japan	Germany; Cuba

== Results ==
First Round
Germany	4
Australia	1
Tunisia	0
China	5
Brazil	1
France	4
Algeria	3
Colombia	2
Japan	5
United Kingdom	0
Spain	1
Cuba	4
Turkey	1
Russia	4
South Korea	3
Mongolia	2

Quarterfinals
Germany	2
China	3
France	5
Algeria	0
Japan	3
Cuba	2
Russia	2
South Korea	3

Semifinals
France	4
China	1
Japan	5
South Korea	0

Final
France	4
Japan	1

=== Repechage ===
Repechage		Third place
Germany	4
Algeria	1	Germany	3
		South Korea	2

Repechage		Third place
Cuba	4
Russia	1	Cuba	3
		China	2
