= Hannah Martin (judoka) =

American judoka (born 1988)

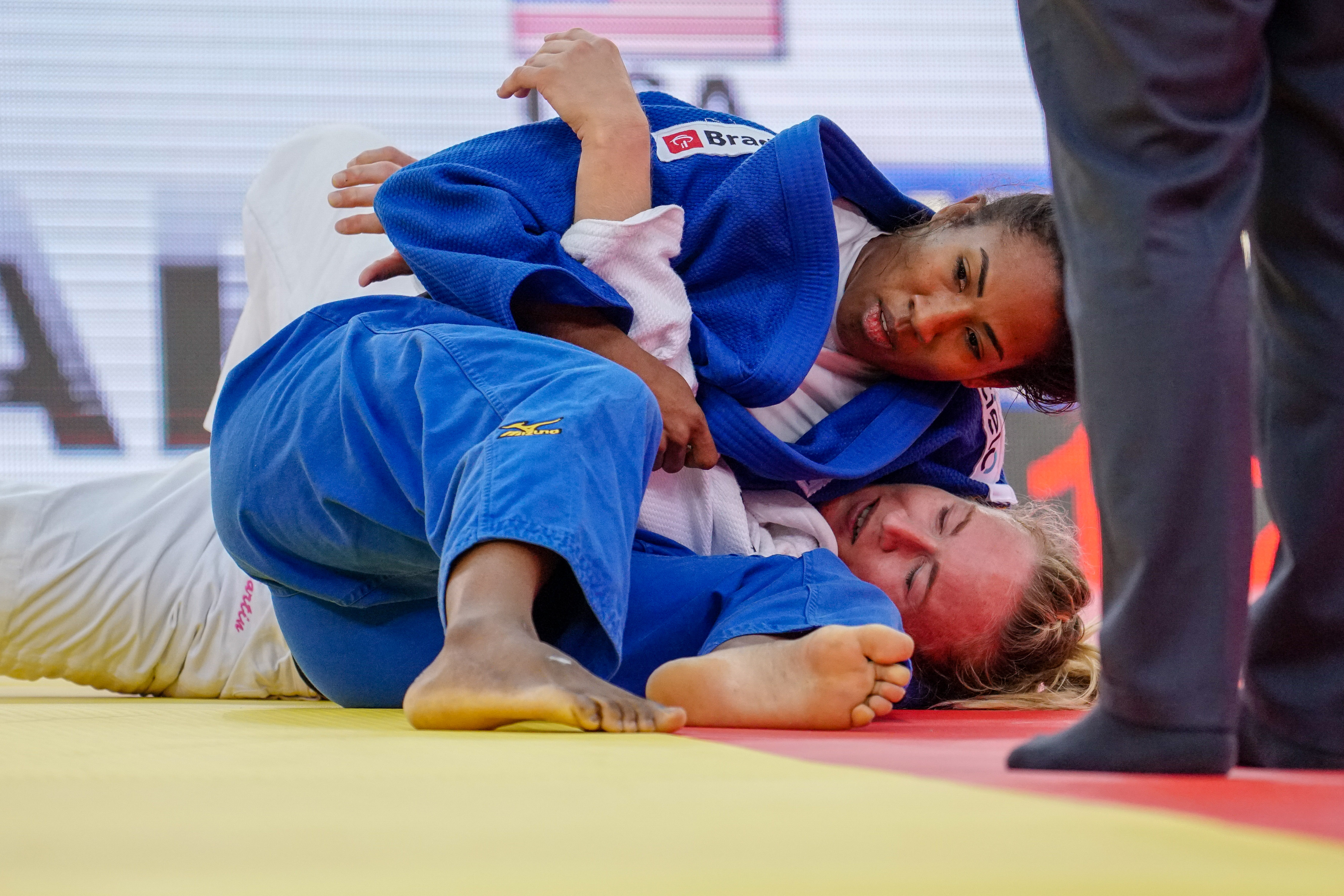

Personal information
- Nationality: American
- Born: June 27, 1988 (age 38)
- Occupation: Judoka

Sport
- Country: United States
- Sport: Judo
- Weight class: ‍–‍63 kg

Achievements and titles
- World Champ.: R16 (2013)
- Pan American Champ.: (2013, 2017, 2019, 2023)
Medal record
Women's judo
Representing United States
Pan American Games
Bronze medal – third place	2019 Lima	‍–‍63 kg
Pan American Championships
Bronze medal – third place	2013 San José	‍–‍63 kg
Bronze medal – third place	2017 Panama City	‍–‍63 kg
Bronze medal – third place	2019 Lima	‍–‍63 kg
Bronze medal – third place	2023 Calgary	‍–‍63 kg
IJF Grand Prix
Silver medal – second place	2013 Tashkent	‍–‍63 kg
Silver medal – second place	2017 Tashkent	‍–‍63 kg
Bronze medal – third place	2013 Ulaanbaatar	‍–‍63 kg
Bronze medal – third place	2013 Abu Dhabi	‍–‍63 kg

Profile at external databases
- IJF: 2226
- JudoInside.com: 34458
- Updated on 18 September 2023

Hannah Martin (born June 27, 1988) is an American judoka.

Martin is the silver medalist of the 2017 Judo Grand Prix Tashkent in the ‍–‍63 kg category.
