= 2010 European Judo Championships – Women's team =

Judo competition

Judo Women's team at the 2010 European Judo Championships
- Venue: Ferry-Dusika-Hallenstadion
- Location: Vienna, Austria
- Date: 25 April
- Nations: 9

Medalists
gold medal	Italy (1st title)
silver medal	Poland
bronze medal	France
bronze medal	Ukraine

Competition at external databases
- Links: EJU • JudoInside

The women's team competition at the 2010 European Judo Championships was held on 25 April at the Ferry-Dusika-Hallenstadion in Austria, Austria.

== Results ==
Round of 16
Poland	3
Austria	2

Quarter-finals
Russia	1
Spain	4
Italy	5
Great Britain	0
France	4
Portugal	1
Poland	3
Ukraine	2

Semi-finals
Spain	2
Italy	3
France	2
Poland	3

Final
Italy	4
Poland	1

=== Repechage ===
Repechage
Russia	2
Great Britain	3

Third place
Great Britain	1
France	4

Repechage
Portugal	2
Ukraine	3

Third place
Ukraine	3
Spain	2
