= Mamadama Bangoura =

Guinean judoka

Personal information
- Born: 10 November 1993 (age 32)
- Occupation: Judoka

Sport
- Sport: Judo

Profile at external databases
- IJF: 7060
- JudoInside.com: 76572

Mamadama Bangoura (born November 10, 1993) is a Guinean judoka.

== Career ==
She competed at the 2016 Summer Olympics in the women's 63 kg event, in which she was eliminated by Estefania García in the first round. She was the flag bearer for Guinea at the Parade of Nations.

Mamadama Bangoura did not return to Guinea after the 2016 Summer Olympics in Brazil, having disappeared after leaving a message saying she wanted to "try her luck" abroad. She was one of two Guinean athletes disappearing shortly before the scheduled return of their country's contingent. The other was Amadou Camara, who competed in swimming events.
