= Tina Trstenjak =

Slovenian judoka (born 1990)

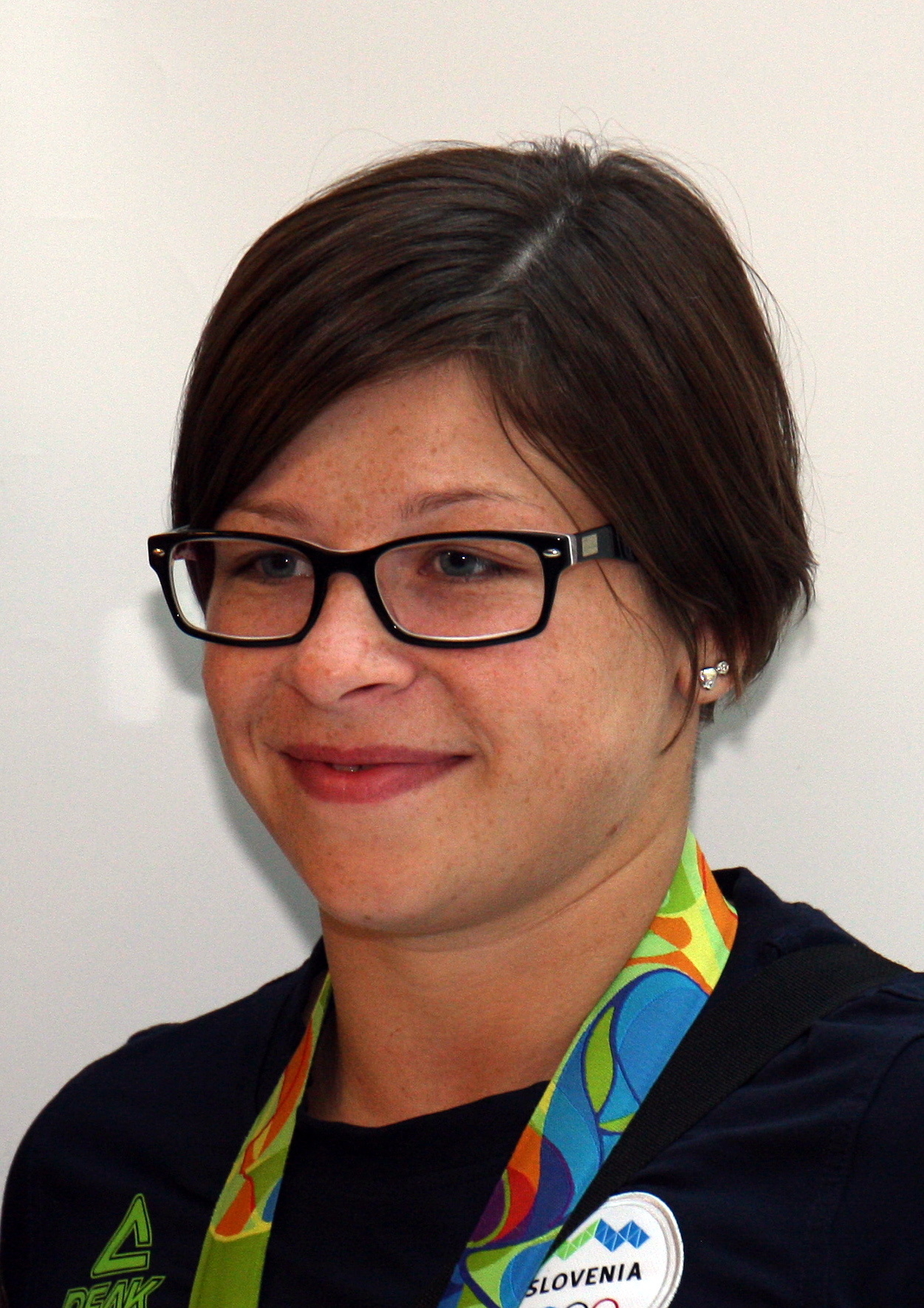
- Trstenjak in 2016

Personal information
- Nationality: Slovenian
- Born: 24 August 1990 (age 35) Celje, Republic of Slovenia, SFR Yugoslavia
- Occupation: Judoka
- Height: 1.61 m (5 ft 3 in)

Sport
- Country: Slovenia
- Sport: Judo
- Weight class: –63 kg
- Rank: 6th dan black belt
- Club: Judo klub Z’ dežele Sankaku Celje
- Coached by: Marjan Fabjan, Urška Žolnir
- Retired: 31 December 2022
Medal record
Women's judo
Representing Slovenia
International judo competitions
| Event | 1st | 2nd | 3rd |
|---|---|---|---|
| Olympic Games | 1 | 1 | 0 |
| World Championships | 1 | 1 | 2 |
| European Championships | 3 | 3 | 2 |
| Total | 5 | 5 | 4 |
Olympic Games
| Gold medal – first place | 2016 Rio de Janeiro | ‍–‍63 kg |
| Silver medal – second place | 2020 Tokyo | ‍–‍63 kg |
World Championships
| Gold medal – first place | 2015 Astana | ‍–‍63 kg |
| Silver medal – second place | 2017 Budapest | ‍–‍63 kg |
| Bronze medal – third place | 2014 Chelyabinsk | ‍–‍63 kg |
| Bronze medal – third place | 2018 Baku | ‍–‍63 kg |
European Games
| Silver medal – second place | 2015 Baku | ‍–‍63 kg |
European Championships
| Gold medal – first place | 2016 Kazan | ‍–‍63 kg |
| Gold medal – first place | 2017 Warsaw | ‍–‍63 kg |
| Gold medal – first place | 2021 Lisbon | ‍–‍63 kg |
| Silver medal – second place | 2014 Montpellier | ‍–‍63 kg |
| Silver medal – second place | 2018 Tel Aviv | ‍–‍63 kg |
| Bronze medal – third place | 2013 Budapest | ‍–‍63 kg |
| Bronze medal – third place | 2014 Montpellier | Women's team |
World Masters
| Bronze medal – third place | 2018 Guangzhou | ‍–‍63 kg |
IJF Grand Slam
| Gold medal – first place | 2014 Abu Dhabi | ‍–‍63 kg |
| Gold medal – first place | 2014 Tokyo | ‍–‍63 kg |
| Gold medal – first place | 2015 Paris | ‍–‍63 kg |
| Gold medal – first place | 2017 Paris | ‍–‍63 kg |
| Gold medal – first place | 2019 Abu Dhabi | ‍–‍63 kg |
| Gold medal – first place | 2020 Budapest | ‍–‍63 kg |
| Gold medal – first place | 2021 Tel Aviv | ‍–‍63 kg |
| Silver medal – second place | 2013 Baku | ‍–‍63 kg |
| Silver medal – second place | 2015 Tokyo | ‍–‍63 kg |
| Silver medal – second place | 2019 Paris | ‍–‍63 kg |
| Silver medal – second place | 2019 Baku | ‍–‍63 kg |
| Silver medal – second place | 2020 Düsseldorf | ‍–‍63 kg |
| Bronze medal – third place | 2016 Tokyo | ‍–‍63 kg |
| Bronze medal – third place | 2017 Tokyo | ‍–‍63 kg |
| Bronze medal – third place | 2018 Paris | ‍–‍63 kg |
| Bronze medal – third place | 2018 Abu Dhabi | ‍–‍63 kg |
| Bronze medal – third place | 2020 Paris | ‍–‍63 kg |
IJF Grand Prix
| Gold medal – first place | 2014 Zagreb | ‍–‍63 kg |
| Gold medal – first place | 2015 Tbilisi | ‍–‍63 kg |
| Gold medal – first place | 2015 Zagreb | ‍–‍63 kg |
| Gold medal – first place | 2015 Budapest | ‍–‍63 kg |
| Gold medal – first place | 2016 Düsseldorf | ‍–‍63 kg |
| Gold medal – first place | 2018 Tunis | ‍–‍63 kg |
| Gold medal – first place | 2019 Zagreb | ‍–‍63 kg |
| Silver medal – second place | 2016 Budapest | ‍–‍63 kg |
| Silver medal – second place | 2018 Zagreb | ‍–‍63 kg |
| Bronze medal – third place | 2012 Qingdao | ‍–‍63 kg |
| Bronze medal – third place | 2017 Düsseldorf | ‍–‍63 kg |
European U23 Championships
| Bronze medal – third place | 2012 Prague | ‍–‍63 kg |
World Juniors Championships
| Bronze medal – third place | 2008 Bangkok | ‍–‍57 kg |
| Bronze medal – third place | 2009 Paris | ‍–‍57 kg |

Profile at external databases
- IJF: 1336
- JudoInside.com: 38341
- Updated on 23 May 2023

Tina Trstenjak (born 24 August 1990) is a Slovenian retired judoka who won gold in the women's 63 kg at the 2016 Summer Olympics in Rio de Janeiro, Brazil. She also won the silver medal in women's 63 kg, at the 2020 Summer Olympics in Tokyo, Japan.

== Medals ==
=== World championships ===
- (bronze) Bronze medal at the 2018 World Championships in Baku.
- (silver) Silver medal at the 2017 World Championships in Budapest.
- (gold) Gold medal at the 2015 World Championships in Astana.
- (bronze) Bronze medal at the 2014 World Championships in Chelyabinsk.
- (bronze) Bronze medal at the 2009 Junior World Championships in Paris.
- (bronze) Bronze medal at the 2008 Junior World Championships in Bangkok.

=== European championships ===
- (gold) Gold medal at the 2021 European Championships in Lisbon.
- (silver) Silver medal at the 2018 European Championships in Tel Aviv.
- (gold) Gold medal at the 2017 European Championships in Warsaw.
- (gold) Gold medal at the 2016 European Championships in Kazan.
- (silver) Silver medal at the 2015 European Championships in Baku.
- (silver) Silver medal at the 2014 European Championships in Montpellier.
- (bronze) Team Bronze medal at the 2014 European Championships in Montpellier.
- (bronze) Bronze medal at the 2013 European Championships in Budapest.

=== National Slovenian Championships ===
- Gold medal at the 2020 National Slovenian Championships.
- Silver medal at the 2019 National Slovenian Championships.
- Gold medal at the 2018 National Slovenian Championships.
- Gold medal at the 2017 National Slovenian Championships.
- Gold medal at the 2015 National Slovenian Championships.
- Gold medal at the 2014 National Slovenian Championships.
- Gold medal at the 2013 National Slovenian Championships.
- Silver medal at the 2012 National Slovenian Championships.
- Silver medal at the 2011 National Slovenian Championships.
- Gold medal at the 2010 National Slovenian Championships.
- Gold medal at the 2009 National Slovenian Championships.
- Silver medal at the 2007 National Slovenian Championships.
- Gold medal at the 2006 National Slovenian Championships.

=== Miscellaneous ===
- Gold medal at the 2020 Budapest Grand Slam.
- Silver medal at the 2020 Düsseldorf Grand Slam.
- Bronze medal at the 2020 Paris Grand Slam.
- Gold medal at the 2019 Abu Dhabi Grand Slam.
- Silver medal at the 2019 Paris Grand Slam.
- Bronze medal at the 2018 Abu Dhabi Grand Slam.
- Bronze medal at the 2018 Paris Grand Slam.
- Gold medal at the 2017 Paris Grand Slam.
- Gold medal at the 2015 Paris Grand Slam.
- Bronze medal at the 2017 Tokyo Grand Slam.
- Bronze medal at the 2016 Tokyo Grand Slam.
- Silver medal at the 2015 Tokyo Grand Slam.
- Gold medal at the 2014 Tokyo Grand Slam.
