= Kathrin Unterwurzacher =

Austrian judoka (born 1992)

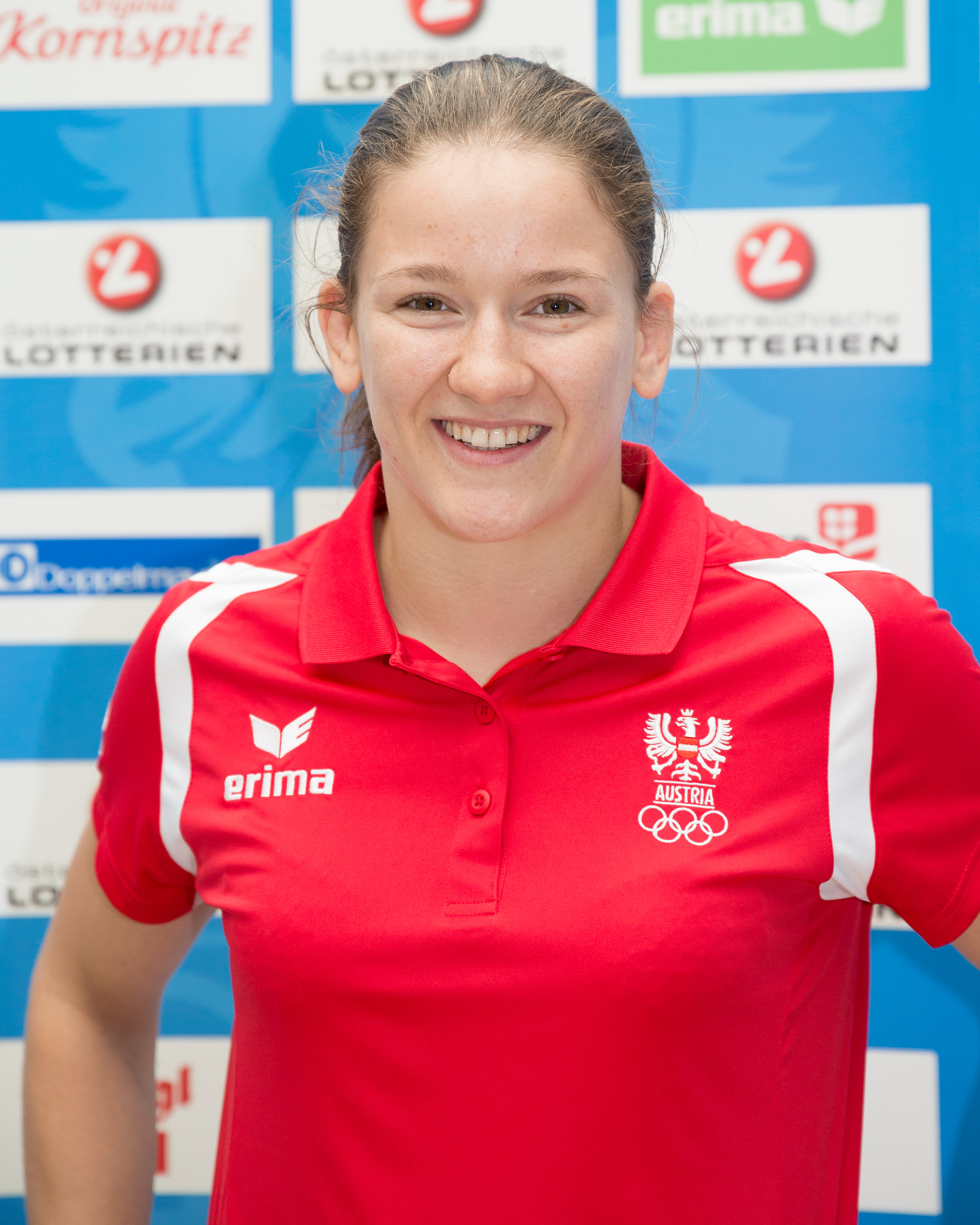
- Unterwurzacher in 2016

Personal information
- Born: 5 June 1992 (age 34)
- Occupation: Judoka

Sport
- Country: Austria
- Sport: Judo
- Weight class: ‍–‍63 kg

Achievements and titles
- Olympic Games: 7th (2016)
- World Champ.: 7th (2014, 2018)
- European Champ.: (silver) (2016)
Medal record
Women's judo
Representing Austria
European Championships
Silver medal – second place	2016 Kazan	‍–‍63 kg
Bronze medal – third place	2017 Warsaw	‍–‍63 kg
World Masters
Silver medal – second place	2015 Rabat	‍–‍63 kg
IJF Grand Slam
Gold medal – first place	2015 Baku	‍–‍63 kg
Gold medal – first place	2016 Tokyo	‍–‍63 kg
Silver medal – second place	2014 Baku	‍–‍63 kg
Silver medal – second place	2016 Abu Dhabi	‍–‍63 kg
Bronze medal – third place	2017 Abu Dhabi	‍–‍63 kg
IJF Grand Prix
Gold medal – first place	2012 Abu Dhabi	‍–‍63 kg
Gold medal – first place	2013 Abu Dhabi	‍–‍63 kg
Gold medal – first place	2014 Samsun	‍–‍63 kg
Gold medal – first place	2016 Tbilisi	‍–‍63 kg
Gold medal – first place	2017 Antalya	‍–‍63 kg
Gold medal – first place	2017 Tashkent	‍–‍63 kg
Gold medal – first place	2019 Tashkent	‍–‍63 kg
Gold medal – first place	2019 Perth	‍–‍63 kg
Silver medal – second place	2014 Tashkent	‍–‍63 kg
Silver medal – second place	2014 Qingdao	‍–‍63 kg
Silver medal – second place	2017 Hohhot	‍–‍63 kg
Bronze medal – third place	2013 Samsun	‍–‍63 kg
Bronze medal – third place	2014 Astana	‍–‍63 kg
Bronze medal – third place	2015 Ulaanbaatar	‍–‍63 kg
Bronze medal – third place	2016 Samsun	‍–‍63 kg
Bronze medal – third place	2017 Tbilisi	‍–‍63 kg
Bronze medal – third place	2018 Tashkent	‍–‍63 kg
European U23 Championships
Gold medal – first place	2011 Tyumen	‍–‍63 kg
Gold medal – first place	2013 Samokov	‍–‍63 kg
Silver medal – second place	2012 Prague	‍–‍63 kg
World Juniors Championships
Bronze medal – third place	2010 Agadir	‍–‍63 kg
European Cadet Championships
Gold medal – first place	2008 Sarajevo	‍–‍63 kg
Summer Universiade
Bronze medal – third place	2013 Kazan	‍–‍63 kg

Profile at external databases
- IJF: 1684
- JudoInside.com: 49510
- Updated on 11 November 2022

Kathrin Unterwurzacher (born 5 June 1992) is an Austrian judoka. She competed at the 2016 Summer Olympics in the women's 63 kg event, in which she was eliminated in the repechage by Anicka van Emden of the Netherlands.
