= Maricet Espinosa =

Cuban judoka (1990–2024)

Personal information
- Full name: Maricet Espinosa González
- Nickname: La Mole
- Born: 2 January 1990 Havana, Cuba
- Died: 21 January 2024 (aged 34)
- Occupation: Judoka

Sport
- Country: Cuba
- Sport: Judo
- Weight class: ‍–‍63 kg

Achievements and titles
- Olympic Games: R16 (2016)
- World Champ.: 5th (2011)
- Pan American Champ.: (2013, 2014)
Medal record
Women's judo
Representing Cuba
Pan American Championships
Gold medal – first place	2013 San José	‍–‍63 kg
Gold medal – first place	2014 Guayaquil	‍–‍63 kg
Silver medal – second place	2016 Havana	‍–‍63 kg
IJF Grand Slam
Bronze medal – third place	2011 Rio de Janeiro	‍–‍63 kg
Bronze medal – third place	2012 Tokyo	‍–‍63 kg
Bronze medal – third place	2016 Baku	‍–‍63 kg
IJF Grand Prix
Silver medal – second place	2016 Havana	‍–‍63 kg
Bronze medal – third place	2013 Miami	‍–‍63 kg
Bronze medal – third place	2014 Havana	‍–‍63 kg
Bronze medal – third place	2015 Qingdao	‍–‍63 kg

Profile at external databases
- IJF: 5293
- JudoInside.com: 49483
- Updated on 23 January 2024

Maricet Espinosa González (2 January 1990 – 21 January 2024) was a Cuban judoka. She competed at the 2016 Summer Olympics in the women's 63 kg event, in which she was eliminated in the second round by Yarden Gerbi.

Espinosa died from a heart attack on 21 January 2024, at the age of 34.
