= Katerina Nikoloska =

Macedonian judoka (born 1990)

Personal information
- Nationality: Macedonian
- Born: 30 December 1990 (age 35)

Sport
- Sport: Judo

Katerina Nikoloska (born 30 December 1990) is an Macedonia judoka.

The first Olympic judoka to represent Macedonia, she competed at the 2016 Summer Olympics in Rio de Janeiro, in the women's 63 kg, where she was eliminated by Büşra Katipoğlu in the first round.
