= Anicka van Emden =

Dutch judoka (born 1986)

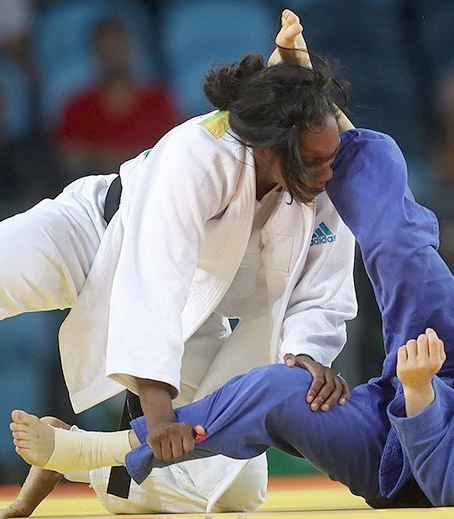
- Van Emden at the 2016 Olympics

Personal information
- Born: 10 December 1986 (age 39)
- Occupation: Judoka
- Height: 169 cm (5 ft 7 in)

Sport
- Country: Netherlands
- Sport: Judo
- Weight class: ‍–‍63 kg
- Club: Budokan Rotterdam
- Coached by: Mark van der Ham

Achievements and titles
- Olympic Games: (bronze) (2016)
- World Champ.: (bronze) (2011, 2013)
- European Champ.: (silver) (2011)
Medal record
Women's judo
Representing the Netherlands
Olympic Games
Bronze medal – third place	2016 Rio de Janeiro	‍–‍63 kg
World Championships
Bronze medal – third place	2011 Paris	‍–‍63 kg
Bronze medal – third place	2013 Rio de Janeiro	‍–‍63 kg
European Championships
Silver medal – second place	2011 Istanbul	‍–‍63 kg
Bronze medal – third place	2014 Montpellier	‍–‍63 kg
Bronze medal – third place	2016 Kazan	‍–‍63 kg
World Masters
Bronze medal – third place	2012 Almaty	‍–‍63 kg
Bronze medal – third place	2013 Tyumen	‍–‍63 kg
Bronze medal – third place	2016 Guadalajara	‍–‍63 kg
IJF Grand Slam
Silver medal – second place	2009 Rio de Janeiro	‍–‍63 kg
Silver medal – second place	2010 Paris	‍–‍63 kg
Silver medal – second place	2010 Moscow	‍–‍63 kg
Silver medal – second place	2013 Paris	‍–‍63 kg
Silver medal – second place	2013 Moscow	‍–‍63 kg
Silver medal – second place	2014 Abu Dhabi	‍–‍63 kg
Bronze medal – third place	2009 Moscow	‍–‍63 kg
Bronze medal – third place	2014 Paris	‍–‍63 kg
Bronze medal – third place	2014 Baku	‍–‍63 kg
Bronze medal – third place	2014 Tokyo	‍–‍63 kg
Bronze medal – third place	2015 Baku	‍–‍63 kg
Bronze medal – third place	2015 Abu Dhabi	‍–‍63 kg
Bronze medal – third place	2016 Paris	‍–‍63 kg
IJF Grand Prix
Gold medal – first place	2011 Amsterdam	‍–‍63 kg
Gold medal – first place	2015 Samsun	‍–‍63 kg
Silver medal – second place	2010 Düsseldorf	‍–‍63 kg
Bronze medal – third place	2009 Qingdao	‍–‍63 kg
Bronze medal – third place	2010 Tunis	‍–‍63 kg
Bronze medal – third place	2010 Rotterdam	‍–‍63 kg
Bronze medal – third place	2011 Baku	‍–‍63 kg
Bronze medal – third place	2011 Qingdao	‍–‍63 kg
Bronze medal – third place	2013 Düsseldorf	‍–‍63 kg
Bronze medal – third place	2013 Abu Dhabi	‍–‍63 kg
Bronze medal – third place	2014 Düsseldorf	‍–‍63 kg
Bronze medal – third place	2014 Budapest	‍–‍63 kg
Bronze medal – third place	2014 Qingdao	‍–‍63 kg
European U23 Championships
Gold medal – first place	2008 Zagreb	‍–‍63 kg
World Juniors Championships
Silver medal – second place	2004 Budapest	‍–‍57 kg
European Junior Championships
Silver medal – second place	2005 Zagreb	‍–‍63 kg
Bronze medal – third place	2004 Sofia	‍–‍57 kg
European Cadet Championships
Silver medal – second place	2002 Győr	‍–‍57 kg

Profile at external databases
- IJF: 1841
- JudoInside.com: 12154
- Updated on 24 May 2023

Anicka van Emden (born 10 December 1986) is a Dutch retired judoka who won a bronze medal at the 2016 Summer Olympics in Rio de Janeiro (shared with Yarden Gerbi). She also won bronze medals at the 2011 and 2013 World Judo Championships.

Since 2007, van Emden works 16 hours a week as a radio diagnostic technician at the Haaglanden Medical Centre in The Hague.
