= 2014 European Judo Championships – Women's team =

Judo competition

Judo Women's team at the 2014 European Judo Championships
- Venue: Sud de France Arena
- Location: Montpellier, France
- Date: 27 April
- Nations: 9

Medalists
gold medal	France (19th title)
silver medal	Germany
bronze medal	Poland
bronze medal	Slovenia

Competition at external databases
- Links: EJU • JudoInside

The women's team competition at the 2014 European Judo Championships was held on 27 April at the Sud de France Arena in Montpellier, France.

== Results ==
Round of 16
Poland	4
Spain	1

Quarter-finals
France	5
Poland	0
Slovenia	5
Bosnia and Herzegovina	0
Germany	5
Hungary	0
Russia	4
United Kingdom	1

Semi-finals
France	3
Slovenia	2
Germany	5
Russia	0

Final
France	3
Germany	2

=== Repechage ===
Repechage
Poland	4
Bosnia and Herzegovina	1

Third place
Poland	3
Russia	2

Repechage
Hungary	2
United Kingdom	3

Third place
United Kingdom	0
Slovenia	5
