= Ekaterina Valkova =

Russian judoka (born 1991)

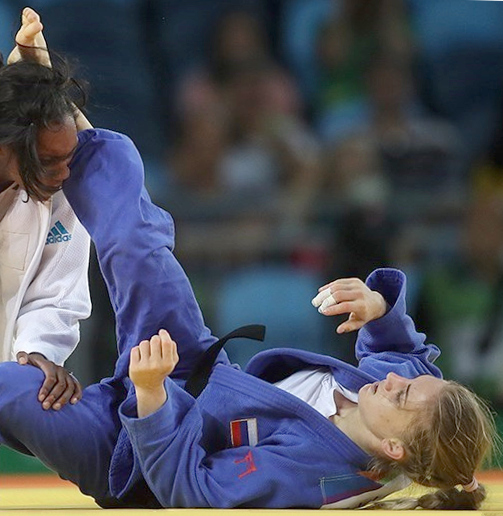
- Valkova at the 2016 Olympics

Personal information
- Born: 17 May 1991 (age 35) Labinsk, Russia
- Occupation: Judoka
- Height: 167 cm (5 ft 6 in)

Sport
- Country: Russia
- Sport: Judo
- Weight class: –63 kg
- Club: Dynamo
- Coached by: Igor Valkov (father)

Achievements and titles
- Olympic Games: R32 (2016)
- World Champ.: R16 (2018)
- European Champ.: (bronze) (2016)
Medal record
Women's judo
Representing Russia
European Championships
Bronze medal – third place	2013 Budapest	Women's team
Bronze medal – third place	2016 Kazan	–63 kg
IJF Grand Slam
Silver medal – second place	2014 Tyumen	–63 kg
Silver medal – second place	2017 Ekaterinburg	–63 kg
Bronze medal – third place	2012 Moscow	–57 kg
Bronze medal – third place	2015 Tokyo	–63 kg
Bronze medal – third place	2021 Kazan	–63 kg
IJF Grand Prix
Bronze medal – third place	2016 Havana	–63 kg
Bronze medal – third place	2016 Düsseldorf	–63 kg
Bronze medal – third place	2017 Tashkent	–63 kg
European Junior Championships
Bronze medal – third place	2010 Samokov	–63 kg
European Cadet Championships
Gold medal – first place	2007 Valletta	–57 kg

Profile at external databases
- IJF: 3820
- JudoInside.com: 43215
- Updated on 11 November 2022

Ekaterina Igorevna Valkova (Russian: Екатерина Игоревна Валькова, born 17 May 1991) is a Russian judoka who competes in the 63 kg division. In 2016, she won a bronze medal at the European championships, but was eliminated in the first round at the Rio Olympics.
