= Martyna Trajdos =

German judoka (born 1989)

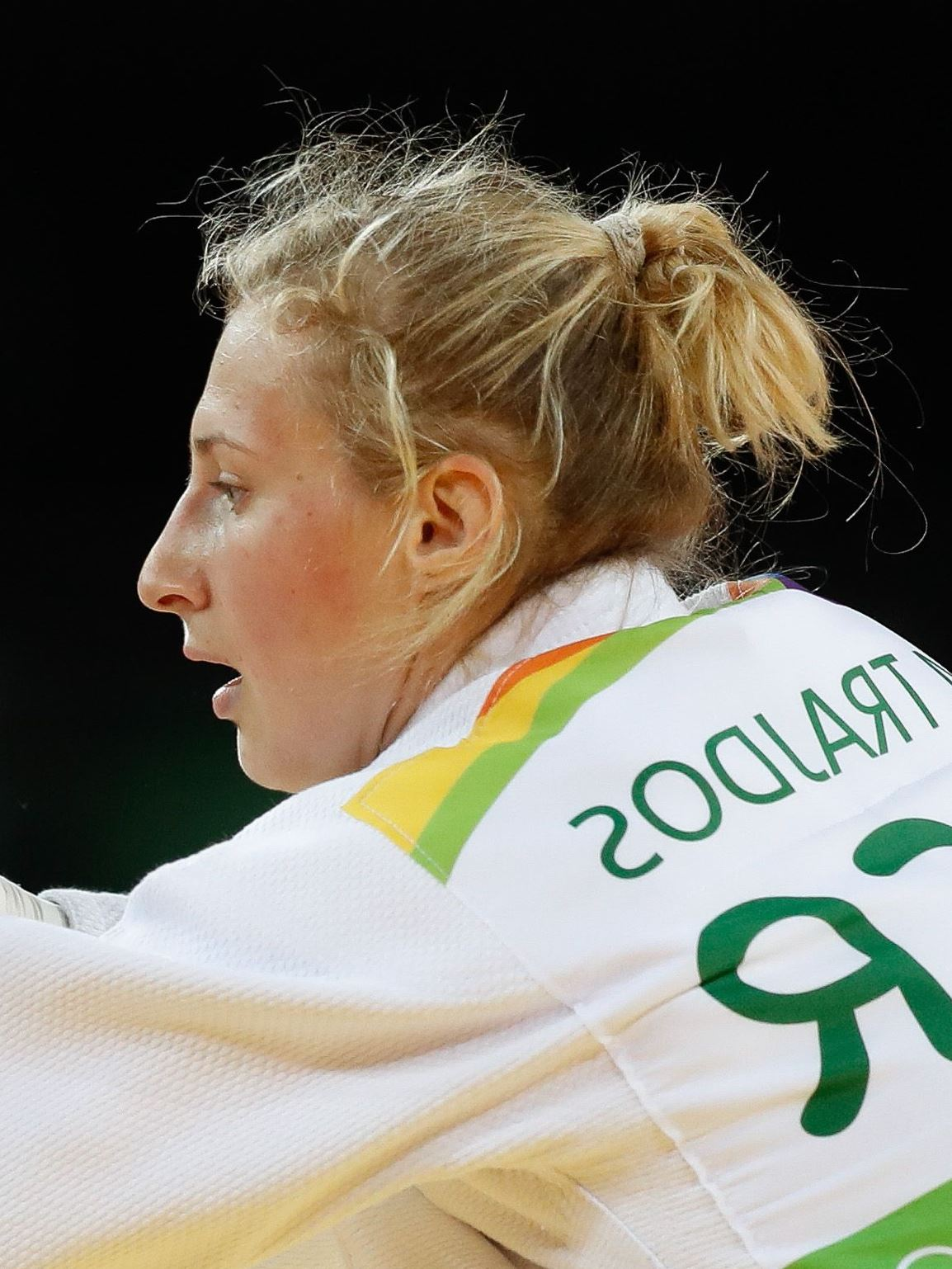
- Trajdos in 2016

Personal information
- Nationality: German
- Born: 5 April 1989 Bełchatów, Poland
- Occupation: Judoka
- Height: 1.71 m (5 ft 7 in)
- Weight: 66 kg (146 lb)

Sport
- Country: Germany
- Sport: Judo
- Weight class: –63 kg

Achievements and titles
- Olympic Games: R16 (2016)
- World Champ.: (bronze) (2019)
- European Champ.: (gold) (2015)
Medal record
Women's judo
Representing Germany
Olympic Games
Bronze medal – third place	2020 Tokyo	Mixed team
World Championships
Bronze medal – third place	2019 Tokyo	‍–‍63 kg
European Games
Gold medal – first place	2015 Baku	‍–‍63 kg
Silver medal – second place	2015 Baku	Women's team
European Championships
Bronze medal – third place	2018 Tel Aviv	‍–‍63 kg
Bronze medal – third place	2020 Prague	‍–‍63 kg
World Masters
Bronze medal – third place	2015 Rabat	‍–‍63 kg
IJF Grand Slam
Gold medal – first place	2015 Tokyo	‍–‍63 kg
Gold medal – first place	2017 Ekaterinburg	‍–‍63 kg
Silver medal – second place	2012 Moscow	‍–‍63 kg
Silver medal – second place	2015 Baku	‍–‍63 kg
Silver medal – second place	2015 Abu Dhabi	‍–‍63 kg
Bronze medal – third place	2013 Baku	‍–‍63 kg
Bronze medal – third place	2013 Moscow	‍–‍63 kg
Bronze medal – third place	2014 Abu Dhabi	‍–‍63 kg
Bronze medal – third place	2015 Paris	‍–‍63 kg
Bronze medal – third place	2016 Paris	‍–‍63 kg
Bronze medal – third place	2018 Paris	‍–‍63 kg
Bronze medal – third place	2019 Baku	‍–‍63 kg
IJF Grand Prix
Gold medal – first place	2013 Qingdao	‍–‍63 kg
Gold medal – first place	2019 Hohhot	‍–‍63 kg
Silver medal – second place	2012 Qingdao	‍–‍63 kg
Silver medal – second place	2014 Budapest	‍–‍63 kg
Silver medal – second place	2017 Düsseldorf	‍–‍63 kg
Silver medal – second place	2018 Budapest	‍–‍63 kg
Bronze medal – third place	2014 Samsun	‍–‍63 kg
Bronze medal – third place	2014 Havana	‍–‍63 kg
Bronze medal – third place	2014 Ulaanbaatar	‍–‍63 kg
Bronze medal – third place	2014 Tashkent	‍–‍63 kg
Bronze medal – third place	2015 Düsseldorf	‍–‍63 kg
Bronze medal – third place	2015 Tbilisi	‍–‍63 kg
Bronze medal – third place	2019 Tbilisi	‍–‍63 kg
Bronze medal – third place	2020 Tel Aviv	‍–‍63 kg
European U23 Championships
Bronze medal – third place	2010 Sarajevo	‍–‍63 kg
Bronze medal – third place	2011 Tyumen	‍–‍63 kg

Profile at external databases
- IJF: 2393
- JudoInside.com: 45653
- Updated on 21 May 2023

Martyna Trajdos (born 5 April 1989) is a German judoka competing in the women's 63 kg division. She won gold at the 2015 European Judo Championships in Baku. She competed at the 2016 Summer Olympics in Rio de Janeiro in the women's 63 kg division. She was defeated by Mariana Silva of Brazil in the second round. In 2020, she won one of the bronze medals in the women's 63 kg event at the 2020 European Judo Championships held in Prague, Czech Republic.

She also competed in the women's 63 kg event at the 2020 Summer Olympics held in Tokyo, Japan.
