= Mia Hermansson =

Swedish judoka (born 1992)

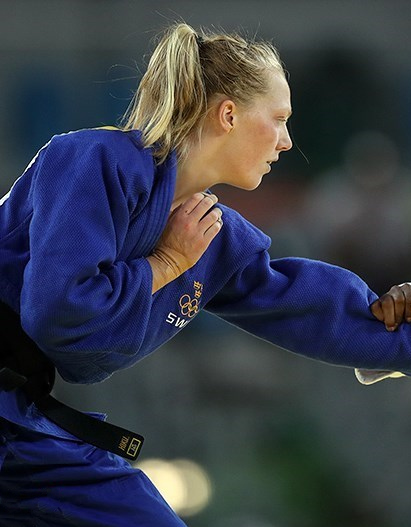
- Hermansson at the 2016 Olympics

Personal information
- Born: 12 December 1992 (age 33)
- Occupation: Judoka
- Height: 175 cm (5 ft 9 in)

Sport
- Country: Sweden
- Sport: Judo
- Weight class: ‍–‍63 kg
- Club: Stockholm Polisen Judo
- Coached by: Robert Eriksson

Achievements and titles
- Olympic Games: R32 (2016)
- World Champ.: R16 (2014)
- European Champ.: 7th (2015)
Medal record
Women's judo
Representing Sweden
IJF Grand Slam
Bronze medal – third place	2016 Tyumen	‍–‍63 kg
IJF Grand Prix
Silver medal – second place	2014 Zagreb	‍–‍63 kg
Bronze medal – third place	2015 Budapest	‍–‍63 kg
Bronze medal – third place	2016 Havana	‍–‍63 kg
Bronze medal – third place	2016 Almaty	‍–‍63 kg
Bronze medal – third place	2017 Zagreb	‍–‍63 kg

Profile at external databases
- IJF: 3509
- JudoInside.com: 47661
- Updated on 25 November 2022

Mia Hermansson (born 12 December 1992) is a Swedish former judoka. She competed at the 2016 Summer Olympics in the 63 kg division, and was eliminated in the first round by Edwige Gwend.
