= Mariana Silva =

Brazilian judoka (born 1990)

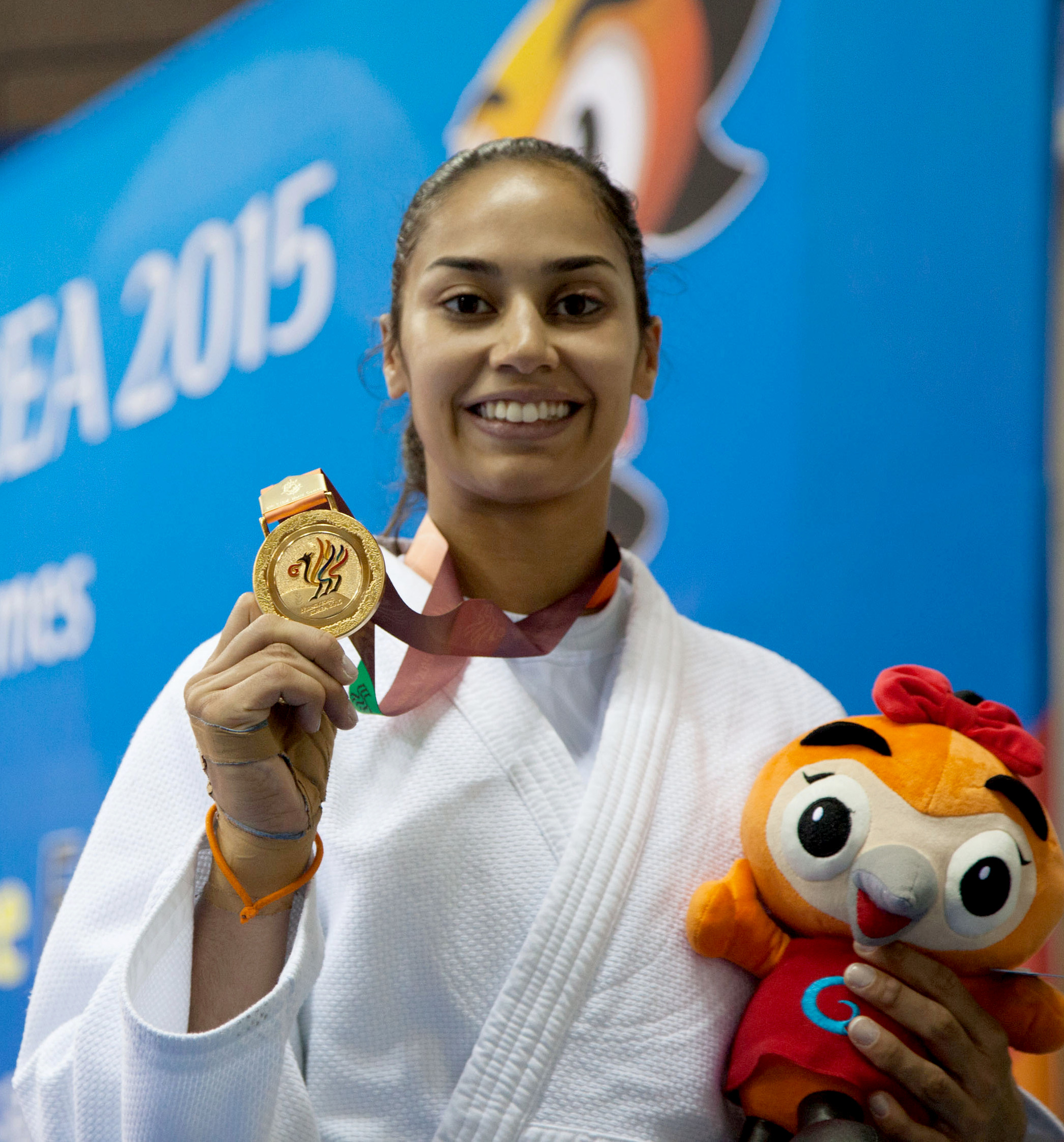
- Silva at the 2015 Military World Games

Personal information
- Full name: Mariana dos Santos Silva
- Born: 22 February 1990 (age 36) Peruíbe, Brazil
- Occupation: Judoka
- Height: 173 cm (5 ft 8 in)

Sport
- Country: Brazil
- Sport: Judo
- Weight class: ‍–‍63 kg
- Club: Minas Tênis Clube
- Coached by: Floriano Almeida

Achievements and titles
- Olympic Games: 5th (2016)
- World Champ.: R16 (2014)
- Pan American Champ.: (2016)
Medal record
Women's judo
Representing Brazil
Pan American Games
Bronze medal – third place	2015 Toronto	‍–‍63 kg
Pan American Championships
Gold medal – first place	2016 Havana	‍–‍63 kg
Silver medal – second place	2011 Guadalajara	‍–‍63 kg
Silver medal – second place	2015 Edmonton	‍–‍63 kg
Bronze medal – third place	2010 San Salvador	‍–‍63 kg
Bronze medal – third place	2012 Montreal	‍–‍63 kg
IJF Grand Slam
Bronze medal – third place	2010 Rio de Janeiro	‍–‍63 kg
Bronze medal – third place	2016 Abu Dhabi	‍–‍63 kg
Bronze medal – third place	2017 Ekaterinburg	‍–‍63 kg
IJF Grand Prix
Silver medal – second place	2013 Almaty	‍–‍63 kg
Silver medal – second place	2016 Samsun	‍–‍63 kg
World Juniors Championships
Bronze medal – third place	2009 Paris	‍–‍63 kg
Military World Games
Gold medal – first place	2015 Mungyeong	‍–‍63 kg
Gold medal – first place	2015 Mungyeong	Team

Profile at external databases
- IJF: 1038
- JudoInside.com: 20910
- Updated on 25 November 2022

Mariana dos Santos Silva (born 22 February 1990) is a judoka from Brazil who competes in the women's half-middleweight (‍–‍63 kg). She won a bronze at the 2015 Pan American Games. That year, she also won gold at the World Military Games. In 2016, she won the Pan American Judo Championships, having won silver in 2011 and 2015, and bronze medals in 2010 and 2012. Previously, she won a bronze medal in the 2009 World Junior Championships. She has appeared at two Olympics for Brazil (2012 and 2016).
