= Edwige Gwend =

Italian judoka (born 1990)

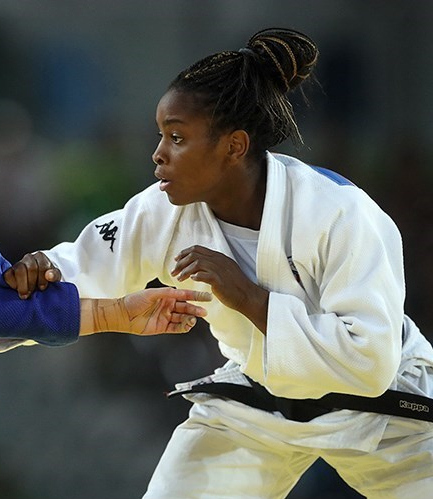
- Gwend at the 2016 Olympics

Personal information
- Born: 11 March 1990 (age 36) Edéa, Cameroon
- Occupation: Judoka
- Height: 163 cm (5 ft 4 in)

Sport
- Country: Italy
- Sport: Judo
- Weight class: –63 kg
- Club: Fiamme Gialle
- Coached by: Massimo Sulli

Achievements and titles
- Olympic Games: R16 (2012, 2016)
- World Champ.: 5th (2014)
- European Champ.: (silver) (2010)
Medal record
Women's judo
Representing Italy
European Games
Bronze medal – third place	2015 Baku	Women's team
European Championships
Gold medal – first place	2010 Vienna	Women's team
Silver medal – second place	2010 Vienna	–63 kg
IJF Grand Slam
Gold medal – first place	2017 Abu Dhabi	–63 kg
Silver medal – second place	2014 Tokyo	–63 kg
Bronze medal – third place	2014 Baku	–63 kg
Bronze medal – third place	2018 Ekaterinburg	–63 kg
IJF Grand Prix
Gold medal – first place	2014 Tbilisi	–63 kg
Gold medal – first place	2015 Tashkent	–63 kg
Silver medal – second place	2015 Jeju	–63 kg
Silver medal – second place	2017 Tbilisi	–63 kg
Bronze medal – third place	2014 Astana	–63 kg
Bronze medal – third place	2015 Tbilisi	–63 kg
Bronze medal – third place	2015 Zagreb	–63 kg
Bronze medal – third place	2016 Tbilisi	–63 kg
Bronze medal – third place	2017 Hohhot	–63 kg
European U23 Championships
Gold medal – first place	2010 Sarajevo	–63 kg
European Junior Championships
Gold medal – first place	2009 Yerevan	–63 kg
Bronze medal – third place	2008 Warsaw	–63 kg
Mediterranean Games
Gold medal – first place	2018 Tarragona	–63 kg

Profile at external databases
- IJF: 1452
- JudoInside.com: 40856
- Updated on 15 November 2022

Edwige Gwend (born 11 March 1990) is a Cameroonean-born Italian judoka who competes in the 63 kg division. She won an individual silver medal at the 2010 European Championships, and was eliminated in the second round at the 2012 and 2016 Olympics.

Gwend emigrated from Cameroon to Italy when she was three years old. In November 2015 she was named Athlete of the Month by the city of Parma.
