= 2019 World Judo Championships – Women's 63 kg =

Judo competition

Judo Women's 63 kg at the 2019 World Judo Championships
- Venue: Nippon Budokan
- Location: Tokyo, Japan
- Date: 28 August
- Competitors: 46 from 35 nations
- Total prize money: 57,000$

Medalists
gold medal	Clarisse Agbegnenou (4th title)	France
silver medal	Miku Tashiro	Japan
bronze medal	Martyna Trajdos	Germany
bronze medal	Juul Franssen	Netherlands

Competition at external databases
- Links: IJF • JudoInside

The Women's 63 kg competition at the 2019 World Judo Championships was held on 28 August 2019.

== Results ==
=== Finals ===
Semi-finals
(France) Clarisse Agbegnenou	01
(Netherlands) Juul Franssen	00
(Slovenia) Tina Trstenjak	00
(Japan) Miku Tashiro	10

Final
(France) Clarisse Agbegnenou	01
(Japan) Miku Tashiro	00

=== Repechage ===
Repechage
(Chinese Taipei) Liao Yu-jung	00
(Germany) Martyna Trajdos	11

Third place
(Germany) Martyna Trajdos	w/o
~~(Slovenia) Tina Trstenjak~~

Repechage
(Mongolia) Boldyn Gankhaich	00
(Netherlands) Sanne Vermeer	10

Third place
(Netherlands) Sanne Vermeer	00
(Netherlands) Juul Franssen	01

=== Pool A ===
First round
(United Kingdom) Alice Schlesinger	10
(Algeria) Amina Belkadi	00
(Israel) Gili Sharir	10
(Mongolia) Baldorjyn Möngönchimeg	00
(Chinese Taipei) Liao Yu-jung	10
(United States) Alisha Galles	00

Second round
(France) Clarisse Agbegnenou	10
(United Kingdom) Alice Schlesinger	00
(Mexico) Prisca Awiti	11
(Kazakhstan) Iolanta Berdybekova	00
(Cuba) Maylín del Toro	00
(Israel) Gili Sharir	10
(Australia) Maeve Coughlan	00
(Chinese Taipei) Liao Yu-jung	10

Third round
(France) Clarisse Agbegnenou	11
(Mexico) Prisca Awiti	00
(Israel) Gili Sharir	00
(Chinese Taipei) Liao Yu-jung	10

Quarterfinals
(France) Clarisse Agbegnenou	10
(Chinese Taipei) Liao Yu-jung	00

=== Pool B ===
First round
(Senegal) Anna Faye	00
(Brazil) Ketleyn Quadros	10
(China) Tang Jing	10
(Poland) Karolina Tałach-Gast	00
(Macau) Tang Lai Man	00
(Madagascar) Damiella Nomenjanahary	10
(Italy) Edwige Gwend	10
(Finland) Emilia Kanerva	00

Second round
(Netherlands) Juul Franssen	10
(Brazil) Ketleyn Quadros	00
(Austria) Kathrin Unterwurzacher	00
(China) Tang Jing	10
(Germany) Martyna Trajdos	10
(Madagascar) Damiella Nomenjanahary	00
(Russia) Daria Davydova	00
(Italy) Edwige Gwend	10

Third round
(Netherlands) Juul Franssen	01
(China) Tang Jing	00
(Germany) Martyna Trajdos	10
(Italy) Edwige Gwend	00

Quarterfinals
(Netherlands) Juul Franssen	01
(Germany) Martyna Trajdos	00

=== Pool C ===
First round
(Cape Verde) Sandrine Billiet	00
(United Kingdom) Lucy Renshall	10
(Brazil) Alexia Castilhos	00
(Mongolia) Boldyn Gankhaich	10
(Israel) Inbal Shemesh	00
(Italy) Maria Centracchio	11

Second round
(Slovenia) Tina Trstenjak	11
(Spain) Cristina Cabaña	00
(Cameroon) Helene Wezeu	00
(United Kingdom) Lucy Renshall	11
(Canada) Catherine Beauchemin-Pinard	00
(Mongolia) Boldyn Gankhaich	10
(United States) Hannah Martin	00
(Italy) Maria Centracchio	01

Third round
(Slovenia) Tina Trstenjak	01
(United Kingdom) Lucy Renshall	00
(Mongolia) Boldyn Gankhaich	01
(Italy) Maria Centracchio	00

Quarterfinals
(Slovenia) Tina Trstenjak	10
(Mongolia) Boldyn Gankhaich	00

=== Pool D ===
First round
(China) Yang Junxia	10
(South Korea) Han Hee-ju	00
(Morocco) Sofia Belattar	00
(Venezuela) Anriquelis Barrios	10
(Australia) Katharina Haecker	01
(Poland) Agata Ozdoba-Błach	00
(Austria) Magdalena Krssakova	01
(Ecuador) Estefania García	00

Second round
(Japan) Miku Tashiro	10
(China) Yang Junxia	00
(Denmark) Lærke Olsen	00
(Venezuela) Anriquelis Barrios	10
(Netherlands) Sanne Vermeer	10
(Australia) Katharina Haecker	00
(Austria) Magdalena Krssakova	00
(Philippines) Kiyomi Watanabe	01

Third round
(Japan) Miku Tashiro	10
(Venezuela) Anriquelis Barrios	00
(Netherlands) Sanne Vermeer	10
(Philippines) Kiyomi Watanabe	00

Quarterfinals
(Japan) Miku Tashiro	10
(Netherlands) Sanne Vermeer	00

== Prize money ==
The sums listed bring the total prizes awarded to 57,000$ for the individual event.

Medal	Total	Judoka	Coach
Gold	26,000$	20,800$	5,200$
Silver	15,000$	12,000$	3,000$
Bronze	8,000$	6,400$	1,600$
