= 2018 World Judo Championships – Women's 63 kg =

Judo Women's 63 kg at the 2018 World Judo Championships
- Venue: National Gymnastics Arena
- Location: Baku, Azerbaijan
- Dates: 23 September
- Competitors: 44 from 34 nations
- Total prize money: 57,000€

Medalists
gold medal	Clarisse Agbegnenou (3rd title)	France
silver medal	Miku Tashiro	Japan
bronze medal	Tina Trstenjak	Slovenia
bronze medal	Juul Franssen	Netherlands

Competition at external databases
- Links: IJF • JudoInside

The Women's 63 kg competition at the 2018 World Judo Championships was held on 23 September 2018.

== Results ==
=== Finals ===
Semi-finals
(France) Clarisse Agbegnenou	10
(Germany) Martyna Trajdos	00
(Slovenia) Tina Trstenjak	00
(Japan) Miku Tashiro	01

Final
(France) Clarisse Agbegnenou	10
(Japan) Miku Tashiro	00

=== Repechage ===
Repechage
(Australia) Katharina Haecker	00
(Cuba) Maylín del Toro	01

Third place
(Cuba) Maylín del Toro	00
(Slovenia) Tina Trstenjak	10

Repechage
(Austria) Kathrin Unterwurzacher	00
(Netherlands) Juul Franssen	01

Third place
(Netherlands) Juul Franssen	01
(Germany) Martyna Trajdos	00

=== Pool A ===
First round
(China) Yang Junxia	00
(Mongolia) Bold Gankhaich	10
(Finland) Emilia Kanerva	00
(Turkey) Büşra Katipoğlu	10
(Netherlands) Sanne Vermeer	11
(Canada) Catherine Beauchemin-Pinard	00

Second round
(France) Clarisse Agbegnenou	10
(Mongolia) Bold Gankhaich	00
(Turkey) Büşra Katipoğlu	01
(Denmark) Laerke Olsen	00
(Australia) Katharina Haecker	01
(Netherlands) Sanne Vermeer	00
(Poland) Karolina Tałach	00
(Ecuador) Estefania García	01

Third round
(France) Clarisse Agbegnenou	10
(Turkey) Büşra Katipoğlu	00
(Australia) Katharina Haecker	10
(Ecuador) Estefania García	01

Quarterfinals
(France) Clarisse Agbegnenou	11
(Australia) Katharina Haecker	00

=== Pool B ===
First round
(United States) Hannah Martin	00
(Brazil) Ketleyn Quadros	10
(Austria) Magdalena Krssakova	00
(United Kingdom) Alice Schlesinger	10
(Mexico) Prisca Awiti	00
(Russia) Daria Davydova	10

Second round
(Slovenia) Andreja Leški	01
(Brazil) Ketleyn Quadros	00
(Cameroon) Helene Wezeu	00
(Cuba) Maylín del Toro	11
(Germany) Martyna Trajdos	01
(United Kingdom) Alice Schlesinger	00
(Nepal) Phupu Lhamu Khatri	00
(Russia) Daria Davydova	10

Third round
(Slovenia) Andreja Leški	00
(Cuba) Maylín del Toro	01
(Germany) Martyna Trajdos	11
(Russia) Daria Davydova	01

Quarterfinals
(Cuba) Maylín del Toro	00
(Germany) Martyna Trajdos	10

=== Pool C ===
First round
(United Kingdom) Amy Livesey	11
(Tunisia) Meriem Bjaoui	00
(South Korea) Kim Ji-jeong	00
(Philippines) Kiyomi Watanabe	10
(Morocco) Sofia Belattar	00
(Poland) Agata Ozdoba	10

Second round
(Slovenia) Tina Trstenjak	01
(United Kingdom) Amy Livesey	00
(Philippines) Kiyomi Watanabe	00
(Spain) Isabel Puche	10
(Austria) Kathrin Unterwurzacher	10
(Poland) Agata Ozdoba	00
(Israel) Gili Sharir	10
(United States) Alisha Galles	00

Third round
(Slovenia) Tina Trstenjak	10
(Spain) Isabel Puche	00
(Austria) Kathrin Unterwurzacher	10
(Israel) Gili Sharir	00

Quarterfinals
(Slovenia) Tina Trstenjak	11
(Austria) Kathrin Unterwurzacher	00

=== Pool D ===
First round
(Madagascar) Damiella Nomenjanahary	00
(Canada) Stéfanie Tremblay	10
(Italy) Edwige Gwend	00
(Mongolia) Baldorjyn Möngönchimeg	01
(Russia) Ekaterina Valkova	10
(Germany) Nadja Bazynski	00

Second round
(Japan) Miku Tashiro	10
(Lebanon) Silva Suellen	00
(Romania) Stefania Adelina Dobre	00
(Canada) Stéfanie Tremblay	10
(Netherlands) Juul Franssen	10
(Mongolia) Baldorjyn Möngönchimeg	00
(Russia) Ekaterina Valkova	11
(Kazakhstan) Akniyet Turdan	00

Third round
(Japan) Miku Tashiro	11
(Canada) Stéfanie Tremblay	00
(Netherlands) Juul Franssen	01
(Russia) Ekaterina Valkova	00

Quarterfinals
(Japan) Miku Tashiro	10
(Netherlands) Juul Franssen	00

== Prize money ==
The sums listed bring the total prizes awarded to 57,000€ for the individual event.

Medal	Total	Judoka	Coach
Gold	26,000€	20,800€	5,200€
Silver	15,000€	12,000€	3,000€
Bronze	8,000€	6,400€	1,600€
