= Judo at the 2019 European Games – Women's 63 kg =

Judo competition

Judo Women's 63 kg at the 2019 European Games
- Venue: Čyžoŭka-Arena
- Location: Minsk, Belarus
- Date: 23 June
- Competitors: 25 from 18 nations

Medalists
gold medal	Clarisse Agbegnenou (4th title)	France
silver medal	Alice Schlesinger	Great Britain
bronze medal	Maria Centracchio	Italy
bronze medal	Sanne Vermeer	Netherlands

Competition at external databases
- Links: IJF • JudoInside

The women's 63 kg judo event at the 2019 European Games in Minsk was held on 23 June at the Čyžoŭka-Arena.

== Results ==
=== Final ===
Final
Clarisse Agbegnenou (FRA)	11
Alice Schlesinger (GBR)	00

=== Repechage ===
Repechage
Karolina Tałach (POL)	10
Daria Davydova (RUS)	00

Third place
Karolina Tałach (POL)	00
Maria Centracchio (ITA)	10

Repechage
Agata Ozdoba-Błach (POL)	00
Martyna Trajdos (GER)	10

Third place
Martyna Trajdos (GER)	00
Sanne Vermeer (NED)	01

=== Top half ===
Round of 32
Kathrin Unterwurzacher (AUT)	00
Inbal Shemesh (ISR)	01
Lucy Renshall (GBR)	00
Karolina Tałach (POL)	10
Lia Ludvik (SLO)	10
Cristina Cabaña (ESP)	00
Edwige Gwend (ITA)	10
Lærke Olsen (DEN)	00
Anja Obradović (SRB)	10
Szofi Özbas (HUN)	00

Round of 16
Clarisse Agbegnenou (FRA)	10
Inbal Shemesh (ISR)	00
Karolina Tałach (POL)	10
Lia Ludvik (SLO)	00
Sanne Vermeer (NED)	01
Edwige Gwend (ITA)	00
Daria Davydova (RUS)	10
Anja Obradović (SRB)	00

Quarterfinals
Clarisse Agbegnenou (FRA)	10
Karolina Tałach (POL)	00
Sanne Vermeer (NED)	10
Daria Davydova (RUS)	00

Semifinals
Clarisse Agbegnenou (FRA)	10
Sanne Vermeer (NED)	00

=== Bottom half ===
Round of 32
Isabel Puche (ESP)	00
Maria Centracchio (ITA)	01
Gili Sharir (ISR)	10
Emilia Kanerva (FIN)	00
Stefania Adelina Dobre (ROU)	10
Nuriyya Akhundova (AZE)	00
Alice Schlesinger (GBR)	10
Yuliia Hrebenozhko (UKR)	00

Round of 16
Juul Franssen (NED)	00
Maria Centracchio (ITA)	10
Agata Ozdoba-Błach (POL)	10
Gili Sharir (ISR)	00
Martyna Trajdos (GER)	10
Stefania Adelina Dobre (ROU)	00
Magdalena Krssakova (AUT)	00
Alice Schlesinger (GBR)	10

Quarterfinals
Maria Centracchio (ITA)	10
Agata Ozdoba-Błach (POL)	00
Martyna Trajdos (GER)	01
Alice Schlesinger (GBR)	10

Semifinals
Maria Centracchio (ITA)	00
Alice Schlesinger (GBR)	10
