= 2021 World Judo Championships – Women's 63 kg =

Judo competition

Judo Women's 63 kg at the 2021 World Judo Championships
- Venue: László Papp Budapest Sports Arena
- Location: Budapest, Hungary
- Date: 9 June
- Competitors: 43 from 35 nations
- Total prize money: 57,000€

Medalists
gold medal	Clarisse Agbegnenou (5th title)	France
silver medal	Andreja Leški	Slovenia
bronze medal	Anja Obradović	Serbia
bronze medal	Sanne Vermeer	Netherlands

Competition at external databases
- Links: IJF • JudoInside

The Women's 63 kg competition at the 2021 World Judo Championships was held on 9 June 2021.

== Results ==
=== Finals ===
Semi-finals
(France) Clarisse Agbegnenou	10
(Netherlands) Sanne Vermeer	00
(Venezuela) Anriquelis Barrios	00
(Slovenia) Andreja Leški	01

Final
(France) Clarisse Agbegnenou	10
(Slovenia) Andreja Leški	00

=== Repechage ===
Repechage
(Cuba) Maylín del Toro Carvajal	00
(Serbia) Anja Obradović	10

Third place
(Serbia) Anja Obradović	01
(Venezuela) Anriquelis Barrios	00

Repechage
(Hungary) Szofi Özbas	00
(Brazil) Ketleyn Quadros	10

Third place
(Brazil) Ketleyn Quadros	01
(Netherlands) Sanne Vermeer	10

=== Pool A ===
First round
(Madagascar) Aina Rasoanaivo	00
(Uzbekistan) Farangiz Khojieva	10
(Hungary) Brigitta Varga	01
(Romania) Florentina Ivănescu	10
(United Kingdom) Amy Livesey	00
(Brazil) Alexia Castilhos	10

Second round
(France) Clarisse Agbegnenou	10
(Denmark) Lærke Olsen	00
(South Korea) Han Hee-ju	10
(Uzbekistan) Farangiz Khojieva	00
(Cuba) Maylín del Toro Carvajal	01
(Romania) Florentina Ivănescu	00
(Philippines) Kiyomi Watanabe	00
(Brazil) Alexia Castilhos	01

Third round
(France) Clarisse Agbegnenou	10
(South Korea) Han Hee-ju	00
(Cuba) Maylín del Toro Carvajal	10
(Brazil) Alexia Castilhos	00

Quarterfinals
(France) Clarisse Agbegnenou	10
(Cuba) Maylín del Toro Carvajal	00

=== Pool B ===
First round
(Spain) Cristina Cabaña	10
(United States) Sara Golden	01
(Serbia) Anja Obradović	10
(Italy) Maria Centracchio	00
(Morocco) Sarah Harachi	00
(Australia) Katharina Haecker	10

Second round
(Netherlands) Sanne Vermeer	10
(Poland) Angelika Szymańska	01
(Israel) Gili Sharir	00
(Spain) Cristina Cabaña	10
(Germany) Martyna Trajdos	00
(Serbia) Anja Obradović	10
(Cameroon) Hélène Wezeu Dombeu	00
(Australia) Katharina Haecker	10

Third round
(Netherlands) Sanne Vermeer	10
(Spain) Cristina Cabaña	00
(Serbia) Anja Obradović	11
(Australia) Katharina Haecker	00

Quarterfinals
(Netherlands) Sanne Vermeer	11
(Serbia) Anja Obradović	00

=== Pool C ===
First round
(Venezuela) Anriquelis Barrios	10
Ekaterina Valkova	01
(Mexico) Prisca Awiti	11
(Kenya) Shagilah Ramadhan	00
Muna Dahouk	00
(Mongolia) Gankhaich Bold	10

Second round
(Japan) Nami Nabekura	00
(Venezuela) Anriquelis Barrios	10
(Ecuador) Estefania García	00
(Mexico) Prisca Awiti	01
(Netherlands) Juul Franssen	00
(Hungary) Szofi Özbas	01
(South Korea) Cho Mok-hee	00
(Mongolia) Gankhaich Bold	10

Third round
(Venezuela) Anriquelis Barrios	10
(Mexico) Prisca Awiti	00
(Hungary) Szofi Özbas	10
(Mongolia) Gankhaich Bold	00

Quarterfinals
(Venezuela) Anriquelis Barrios	01
(Hungary) Szofi Özbas	00

=== Pool D ===
First round
(Cape Verde) Sandrine Billiet	10
(Madagascar) Damiella Nomenjanahary	00
(Austria) Magdalena Krssakova	10
(Algeria) Amina Belkadi	00

Second round
(Slovenia) Andreja Leški	10
(Cape Verde) Sandrine Billiet	00
(United Kingdom) Lucy Renshall	10
(Spain) Isabel Puche	00
(Brazil) Ketleyn Quadros	10
(Kosovo) Laura Fazliu	00
(United States) Alisha Galles	10
(Austria) Magdalena Krssakova	00

Third round
(Slovenia) Andreja Leški	10
(United Kingdom) Lucy Renshall	00
(Brazil) Ketleyn Quadros	10
(United States) Alisha Galles	00

Quarterfinals
(Slovenia) Andreja Leški	10
(Brazil) Ketleyn Quadros	00

== Prize money ==
The sums listed bring the total prizes awarded to 57,000€ for the individual event.

Medal	Total	Judoka	Coach
Gold	26,000€	20,800€	5,200€
Silver	15,000€	12,000€	3,000€
Bronze	8,000€	6,400€	1,600€
