= Büşra Katipoğlu =

Turkish judoka (born 1992)

Personal information
- Full name: Büşra Kâtipoğlu Üreten
- Born: 17 January 1992 (age 34) Istanbul, Turkey
- Occupation: Judoka
- Height: 169 cm (5 ft 7 in)

Sport
- Country: Turkey
- Sport: Judo
- Weight class: ‍–‍63 kg
- Club: Istanbul BB SK

Achievements and titles
- Olympic Games: R16 (2016)
- World Champ.: R16 (2011, 2018)
- European Champ.: R16 (2012, 2016)
Medal record
Women's judo
Representing Turkey
IJF Grand Slam
Bronze medal – third place	2016 Baku	‍–‍63 kg
Bronze medal – third place	2017 Baku	‍–‍63 kg
IJF Grand Prix
Silver medal – second place	2015 Qingdao	‍–‍63 kg
Bronze medal – third place	2015 Tashkent	‍–‍63 kg
Bronze medal – third place	2018 Antalya	‍–‍63 kg
World Team Championships
Bronze medal – third place	2010 Antalya	Women's team
European Championships
Bronze medal – third place	2011 Istanbul	Women's team
Bronze medal – third place	2012 Chelyabinsk	Women's team
European Junior Championships
Bronze medal – third place	2009 Yerevan	‍–‍63 kg
Bronze medal – third place	2011 Lommel	‍–‍63 kg
Mediterranean Games
Bronze medal – third place	2018 Tarragona	‍–‍63 kg
Islamic Solidarity Games
Gold medal – first place	2017 Baku	‍–‍63 kg
Gold medal – first place	2017 Baku	Women's team

Profile at external databases
- IJF: 1314
- JudoInside.com: 47042
- Updated on 5 January 2025

Büşra Kâtipoğlu Üreten (born 17 January 1992) is a Turkish judoka competing in the ‍–‍63 kg division. She is a member of İstanbul Büyükşehir Belediyesi S.K. She is a student of Bülent Ecevit University in Zonguldak. She qualified for the 2016 Olympics in the women's judo under 63 kg division.

Kâtipoğlu won the bronze medal at the 2015 Tashkent Grand Prix in Uzbekistan. At the 2015 Qingdao Grand Prix in China she became silver medalist. In 2016, she took the bronze medal at the 2016 Grand Slam Baku in Azerbaijan.
