= 2013 World Judo Championships – Women's 57 kg =

Judo competition

Judo Women's 57 kg at the 2013 World Judo Championships
- Venue: Ginásio do Maracanãzinho
- Location: Rio de Janeiro, Brazil
- Date: 28 August 2013
- Competitors: 50 from 40 nations

Medalists
gold medal	Rafaela Silva (1st title)	Brazil
silver medal	Marti Malloy	United States
bronze medal	Vlora Bedeti	Slovenia
bronze medal	Miryam Roper	Germany

Competition at external databases
- Links: IJF • JudoInside

The women's 57 kg competition of the 2013 World Judo Championships was held on August 28.

== Medalists ==
Gold	Silver	Bronze
Rafaela Silva (BRA)	Marti Malloy (USA)	Vlora Bedeti (SVN); Miryam Roper (GER)

== Results ==
=== Pool A ===
First Round
(Senegal) Hortense Diédhiou	100
(Ghana) Szandra Szögedi	000
(Haiti) Bettyna Chery	000
(Russia) Tatiana Kazenyuk	100
(Germany) Johanna Müller	000
(Colombia) Yadinis Amarís	102
(China) Liu Dongyin	000
(Austria) Tina Zeltner	001

Quarterfinals
(France) Automne Pavia	100
(Senegal) Hortense Diédhiou	000
(Russia) Tatiana Kazenyuk	100
(The Bahamas) Cynthia Rahming	000
(Japan) Anzu Yamamoto	101
(Colombia) Yadinis Amarís	001
(Cuba) Anailys Dorvigny	010
(Austria) Tina Zeltner	000

Semifinals
(France) Automne Pavia	102
(Russia) Tatiana Kazenyuk	000
(Japan) Anzu Yamamoto	100
(Cuba) Anailys Dorvigny	000

Final
(France) Automne Pavia	000
(Japan) Anzu Yamamoto	000

=== Pool B ===
First Round
(Hungary) Katinka Szabo	000
(United States) Hana Carmichael	001
(Ecuador) Diana Villavicencio	000
(Romania) Loredana Ohâi	000
(Spain) Jaione Equisoain	000
(Canada) Stéfanie Tremblay	100
(Kosovo) Nora Gjakova	101
(Argentina) Melissa Rodríguez	000
(Netherlands) Carla Grol	110
(New Zealand) Adel Van Der Walt	000

Quarterfinals
(Brazil) Rafaela Silva	002
(United States) Hana Carmichael	000
(Romania) Loredana Ohâi	001
(Canada) Stéfanie Tremblay	000
(Portugal) Telma Monteiro	000
(Kosovo) Nora Gjakova	010
(Netherlands) Carla Grol	100
(South Korea) Jan-Di Kim	000

Semifinals
(Brazil) Rafaela Silva	010
(Romania) Loredana Ohâi	001
(Kosovo) Nora Gjakova	110
(Netherlands) Carla Grol	000

Final
(Brazil) Rafaela Silva	100
(Kosovo) Nora Gjakova	000

=== Pool C ===
First Round
(Chinese Taipei) Lien Chen-ling	000
(Ukraine) Shushana Hevondian	000
(Canada) Joliane Melançon	000
(Slovenia) Vlora Bedeti	000
(Netherlands) Juul Franssen	100
(Afghanistan) Fahima Rezayee	000
(Finland) Satu Lehikoinen	000
(Israel) Camila Minakawa	100

Quarterfinals
(Mongolia) Dorjsürengiin Sumiya	000
(Chinese Taipei) Lien Chen-ling	000
(Honduras) Cergia David	000
(Slovenia) Vlora Bedeti	100
(Austria) Sabrina Filzmozer	000
(Netherlands) Juul Franssen	000
(Israel) Camila Minakawa	000
(Russia) Irina Zabludina	000

Semifinals
(Mongolia) Dorjsürengiin Sumiya	000
(Slovenia) Vlora Bedeti	000
(Netherlands) Juul Franssen	000
(Israel) Camila Minakawa	001

Final
(Slovenia) Vlora Bedeti	100
(Israel) Camila Minakawa	010

=== Pool D ===
First Round
(Angola) Bruna Silva De Freitas	000
(China) Li Xiandong	100
(Azerbaijan) Kifayat Gasimova	100
(Paraguay) Andrea Fleitas	000
(Bulgaria) Ivelina Ilieva	000
(Romania) Corina Căprioriu	000
(United Kingdom) Nekoda Smythe Davis	010
(Hungary) Hedvig Karakas	100
(Venezuela) Anriquelis Barrios	000
(United States) Marti Malloy	100

Quarterfinals
(Germany) Miryam Roper	011
(China) Li Xiandong	000
(Azerbaijan) Kifayat Gasimova	100
(Bulgaria) Ivelina Ilieva	000
(Brazil) Ketleyn Quadros	001
(Hungary) Hedvig Karakas	000
(United States) Marti Malloy	001
(Serbia) Jovana Rogić	000

Semifinals
(Germany) Miryam Roper	111
(Azerbaijan) Kifayat Gasimova	000
(Brazil) Ketleyn Quadros	000
(United States) Marti Malloy	002

Final
(Germany) Miryam Roper	000
(United States) Marti Malloy	100

=== Finals ===
Semi-finals
(France) Automne Pavia	000
(Brazil) Rafaela Silva	010
(Slovenia) Vlora Bedeti	000
(United States) Marti Malloy	011

Final
(Brazil) Rafaela Silva	100
(United States) Marti Malloy	000

=== Repechage ===
Repechage		Third place
(Japan) Anzu Yamamoto	000
(Kosovo) Nora Gjakova	000	(Japan) Anzu Yamamoto	000
		(Slovenia) Vlora Bedeti	000

Repechage		Third place
(Israel) Camila Minakawa	000
(Germany) Miryam Roper	101	(Germany) Miryam Roper	100
		(France) Automne Pavia	000
