= 2020 European Judo Championships – Women's 63 kg =

Judo competition

Judo Women's 63 kg at the 2020 European Judo Championships
- Venue: O2 Arena
- Location: Prague, Czech Republic
- Date: 20 November
- Competitors: 18 from 12 nations

Medalists
gold medal	Clarisse Agbegnenou (5th title)	France
silver medal	Magdalena Krssakova	Austria
bronze medal	Martyna Trajdos	Germany
bronze medal	Juul Franssen	Netherlands

Competition at external databases
- Links: IJF • JudoInside

The women's 63 kg competition at the 2020 European Judo Championships was held on 20 November at the O2 Arena.

== Results ==
=== Final ===
Final
Clarisse Agbegnenou (FRA)	10
Magdalena Krssakova (AUT)	00

=== Repechage ===
Repechage
Angelika Szymańska (POL)	10
Daria Davydova (RUS)	00

Third place
Angelika Szymańska (POL)	00
Martyna Trajdos (GER)	01

Repechage
Tina Trstenjak (SLO)	00
Andreja Leški (SLO)	10

Third place
Andreja Leški (SLO)	00
Juul Franssen (NED)	10

=== Top half ===
Round of 32
Renata Zachová (CZE)	00
Lærke Olsen (DEN)	01

Round of 16
Clarisse Agbegnenou (FRA)	10
Stefania Adelina Dobre (ROU)	00
Maria Centracchio (ITA)	00
Angelika Szymańska (POL)	01
Juul Franssen (NED)	01
Cristina Cabaña (ESP)	00
Daria Davydova (RUS)	10
Lærke Olsen (DEN)	00

Quarterfinals
Clarisse Agbegnenou (FRA)	10
Angelika Szymańska (POL)	00
Juul Franssen (NED)	10
Daria Davydova (RUS)	00

Semifinals
Clarisse Agbegnenou (FRA)	10
Juul Franssen (NED)	00

=== Bottom half ===
Round of 32
Geke van den Berg (NED)	10
Agata Ozdoba-Błach (POL)	00

Round of 16
Tina Trstenjak (SLO)	10
Florentina Ivănescu (ROU)	00
Magdalena Krssakova (AUT)	01
Isabel Puche (ESP)	00
Martyna Trajdos (GER)	01
Edwige Gwend (ITA)	00
Andreja Leški (SLO)	01
Geke van den Berg (NED)	00

Quarterfinals
Tina Trstenjak (SLO)	00
Magdalena Krssakova (AUT)	01
Martyna Trajdos (GER)	10
Andreja Leški (SLO)	00

Semifinals
Magdalena Krssakova (AUT)	10
Martyna Trajdos (GER)	00
