= 2017 World Judo Championships – Women's 63 kg =

Judo Women's 63 kg at the 2017 World Judo Championships
- Venue: László Papp Budapest Sports Arena
- Location: Budapest, Hungary
- Dates: 31 August
- Competitors: 47 from 37 nations
- Total prize money: 57,000$

Medalists
gold medal	Clarisse Agbegnenou (2nd title)	France
silver medal	Tina Trstenjak	Slovenia
bronze medal	Agata Ozdoba	Poland
bronze medal	Mungunchimeg Baldorj	Mongolia

Competition at external databases
- Links: IJF • JudoInside

The Women's 63 kg competition at the 2017 World Judo Championships was held on 31 August 2017.

== Results ==
=== Finals ===
Semi-finals
(Slovenia) Tina Trstenjak	10
(China) Yang Junxia	00
(Poland) Agata Ozdoba	00
(France) Clarisse Agbegnenou	00

Final
(Slovenia) Tina Trstenjak	00
(France) Clarisse Agbegnenou	10

=== Repechage ===
Repechage
(United Kingdom) Amy Livesey	00
(Germany) Martyna Trajdos	10

Third place
(Germany) Martyna Trajdos	00
(Poland) Agata Ozdoba	01

Repechage
(Brazil) Ketleyn Quadros	00
(Mongolia) Mungunchimeg Baldorj	10

Third place
(Mongolia) Mungunchimeg Baldorj	10
(China) Yang Junxia	00

=== Pool A ===
First round
(Spain) Cristina Cabaña	10
(Zambia) Rachel Musuku	00
(Belarus) Daniela Kazanoi	00
(Austria) Magdalena Krssakova	01
(Kazakhstan) Dilbar Umiraliyeva	00
(Poland) Karolina Tałach	11
(Kyrgyzstan) Meerim Momunova	00
(Mongolia) Bold Gankhaich	10

Second round
(Slovenia) Tina Trstenjak	02
(Spain) Cristina Cabaña	00
(Austria) Magdalena Krssakova	10
(Chinese Taipei) Chen Yun-ting	00
(United Kingdom) Amy Livesey	10
(Poland) Karolina Tałach	00
(South Korea) Han Hee-ju	00
(Mongolia) Bold Gankhaich	10

Third round
(Slovenia) Tina Trstenjak	01
(Austria) Magdalena Krssakova	00
(United Kingdom) Amy Livesey	01
(Mongolia) Bold Gankhaich	00

Quarterfinals
(Slovenia) Tina Trstenjak	01
(United Kingdom) Amy Livesey	00

=== Pool B ===
First round
(Azerbaijan) Dursadaf Karimova	00
(Venezuela) Anriquelis Barrios	11
(China) Yang Junxia	10
(Cuba) Maylín del Toro	00
(Cameroon) Helene Wezeu	00
(North Korea) Kim Hye-sun	01

Second round
(Germany) Martyna Trajdos	11
(Venezuela) Anriquelis Barrios	00
(United States) Hannah Martin	00
(Russia) Daria Davydova	02
(United Kingdom) Alice Schlesinger	00
(China) Yang Junxia	10
(Morocco) Sofia Belattar	00
(North Korea) Kim Hye-sun	01

Third round
(Germany) Martyna Trajdos	01
(Russia) Daria Davydova	00
(China) Yang Junxia	10
(North Korea) Kim Hye-sun	00

Quarterfinals
(Germany) Martyna Trajdos	01
(China) Yang Junxia	11

=== Pool C ===
First round
(Ecuador) Estefania García	00
(Brazil) Ketleyn Quadros	01
(United States) Leilani Akiyama	11
(Madagascar) Damiella Nomenjanahary	00
(Italy) Edwige Gwend	10
(Greece) Ioulietta Boukouvala	00
(Poland) Agata Ozdoba	00
(Romania) Stefania Adelina Dobre	00

Second round
(Austria) Kathrin Unterwurzacher	01
(Brazil) Ketleyn Quadros	02
(Philippines) Kiyomi Watanabe	11
(United States) Leilani Akiyama	00
(Australia) Katharina Haecker	00
(Italy) Edwige Gwend	01
(Poland) Agata Ozdoba	10
(Sweden) Mia Hermansson	00

Third round
(Brazil) Ketleyn Quadros	02
(Philippines) Kiyomi Watanabe	01
(Italy) Edwige Gwend	00
(Poland) Agata Ozdoba	10

Quarterfinals
(Brazil) Ketleyn Quadros	00
(Poland) Agata Ozdoba	01

=== Pool D ===
First round
(Israel) Inbal Shemesh	10
(Russia) Ekaterina Valkova	00
(Kazakhstan) Marian Urdabayeva	01
(Nepal) Phupu Khatri	00
(Canada) Stéfanie Tremblay	00
(Slovenia) Andreja Leški	01
(India) Sunibala Huidrom	00
(Mongolia) Mungunchimeg Baldorj	11

Second round
(France) Clarisse Agbegnenou	10
(Israel) Inbal Shemesh	00
(Kazakhstan) Marian Urdabayeva	01
(Spain) Isabel Puche	10
(France) Margaux Pinot	01
(Slovenia) Andreja Leški	00
(Finland) Emilia Kanerva	00
(Mongolia) Mungunchimeg Baldorj	11

Third round
(France) Clarisse Agbegnenou	01
(Spain) Isabel Puche	00
(France) Margaux Pinot	00
(Mongolia) Mungunchimeg Baldorj	01

Quarterfinals
(France) Clarisse Agbegnenou	10
(Mongolia) Mungunchimeg Baldorj	00

== Prize money ==
The sums listed bring the total prizes awarded to 57,000$ for the individual event.

Medal	Total	Judoka	Coach
Gold	26,000$	20,800$	5,200$
Silver	15,000$	12,000$	3,000$
Bronze	8,000$	6,400$	1,600$
