= Miki Tanaka =

Japanese judoka (born 1987)

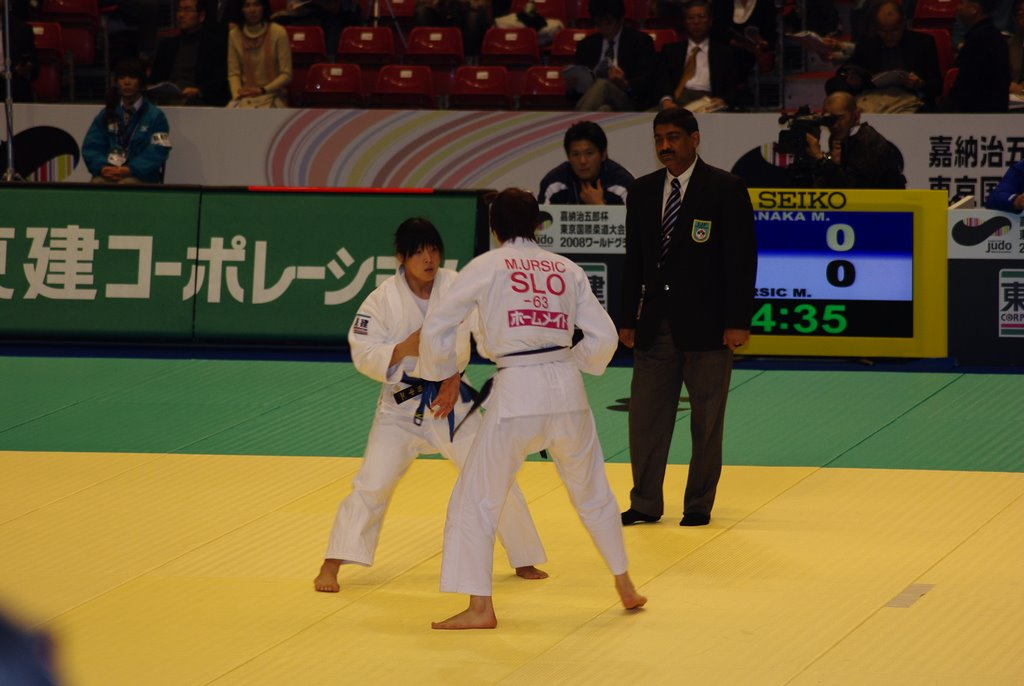

Personal information
- Native name: 田中 美衣
- Nationality: Japanese
- Born: 20 October 1987 (age 38) Nagahama, Shiga, Japan
- Occupation: Judo coach

Sport
- Country: Japan
- Sport: Judo
- Weight class: ‍–‍63 kg
- Rank: Black belt
- Now coaching: Israel national judo team

Achievements and titles
- World Champ.: (silver) (2010)
- Asian Champ.: (bronze) (2013)
Medal record
Women's judo
Representing Japan
World Championships
Gold medal – first place	2013 Rio de Janeiro	Women's team
Silver medal – second place	2010 Tokyo	‍–‍63 kg
Bronze medal – third place	2010 Antalya	Women's team
Asian Championships
Bronze medal – third place	2013 Bangkok	‍–‍63 kg
East Asian Games
Gold medal – first place	2009 Hong Kong	‍–‍63 kg
World Masters
Silver medal – second place	2012 Almaty	‍–‍63 kg
Bronze medal – third place	2010 Suwon	‍–‍63 kg
IJF Grand Slam
Gold medal – first place	2012 Paris	‍–‍63 kg
Bronze medal – third place	2008 Tokyo	‍–‍63 kg
Bronze medal – third place	2011 Tokyo	‍–‍63 kg
Bronze medal – third place	2013 Paris	‍–‍63 kg
Bronze medal – third place	2013 Tokyo	‍–‍63 kg
IJF Grand Prix
Gold medal – first place	2009 Qingdao	‍–‍63 kg
Gold medal – first place	2012 Qingdao	‍–‍63 kg
Silver medal – second place	2009 Tunis	‍–‍63 kg
Silver medal – second place	2013 Miami	‍–‍63 kg
Summer Universiade
Gold medal – first place	2011 Shenzhen	Women's team
Silver medal – second place	2009 Belgrade	‍–‍63 kg
Silver medal – second place	2011 Shenzhen	‍–‍63 kg

Profile at external databases
- IJF: 1795
- JudoInside.com: 54543
- Updated on 25 July 2023

Miki Tanaka (田中 美衣, Tanaka Miki; born 20 October 1987 in Nagahama, Shiga) is a Japanese judoka. She won the silver medal in the half-middleweight (63 kg) division at the 2010 World Judo Championships. Tanaka was a coach with the company judo team Ryotokuji, and as of January 2017 is part of the coaching staff of the Israeli women's national team.
