= Anzu Yamamoto =

Japanese judoka (born 1994)

Personal information
- Born: 18 June 1994 (age 32) Yokohama, Kanagawa, Japan
- Occupation: Judoka

Sport
- Country: Japan
- Sport: Judo
- Weight class: ‍–‍57 kg, –63 kg

Achievements and titles
- World Champ.: 5th (2013)
- Asian Champ.: (gold) (2012, 2014)
Medal record
Women's judo
Representing Japan
World Championships
Gold medal – first place	2013 Rio de Janeiro	Women's team
Gold medal – first place	2015 Astana	Women's team
Asian Games
Gold medal – first place	2014 Incheon	‍–‍57 kg
Gold medal – first place	2014 Incheon	Women's team
Asian Championships
Gold medal – first place	2012 Tashkent	‍–‍57 kg
Bronze medal – third place	2016 Tashkent	‍–‍57 kg
IJF Grand Slam
Gold medal – first place	2012 Tokyo	‍–‍57 kg
Gold medal – first place	2014 Paris	‍–‍57 kg
Silver medal – second place	2010 Tokyo	‍–‍52 kg
Silver medal – second place	2013 Paris	‍–‍57 kg
Silver medal – second place	2017 Tokyo	‍–‍57 kg
Bronze medal – third place	2011 Tokyo	‍–‍57 kg
Bronze medal – third place	2013 Tokyo	‍–‍57 kg
IJF Grand Prix
Silver medal – second place	2012 Düsseldorf	‍–‍57 kg
Bronze medal – third place	2015 Qingdao	‍–‍57 kg
Bronze medal – third place	2016 Qingdao	‍–‍57 kg
World Juniors Championships
Gold medal – first place	2010 Agadir	‍–‍52 kg
Gold medal – first place	2011 Cape Town	‍–‍57 kg
Summer Universiade
Bronze medal – third place	2015 Gwangju	‍–‍57 kg

Profile at external databases
- IJF: 3633
- JudoInside.com: 64594
- Updated on 26 November 2022

Anzu Yamamoto (山本 杏, Yamamoto Anzu; born 18 June 1994, Yokohama, Kanagawa, Japan) is a Japanese judoka.

Yamamoto competed at the 2013 World Judo Championships in Rio de Janeiro, where she placed fifth in the ‍–‍57 kg class.

Yamamoto was part of the Japanese women's team that won gold medals in the world championship team competitions in 2013 and 2015.
