= Hiroki Tachiyama =

Japanese judoka

Personal information
- Born: 24 November 1985 (age 40)
- Occupation: Judoka

Sport
- Country: Japan
- Sport: Judo
- Weight class: +100 kg, Open

Achievements and titles
- World Champ.: (bronze) (2010)
- Asian Champ.: (silver) (2009)
Medal record
Men's judo
Representing Japan
World Championships
Gold medal – first place	2010 Antalya	Men's team
Bronze medal – third place	2010 Tokyo	Open
Asian Championships
Silver medal – second place	2009 Taipei	Open
Bronze medal – third place	2008 Jeju	Open
IJF Grand Slam
Silver medal – second place	2009 Rio de Janeiro	+100 kg
Bronze medal – third place	2008 Tokyo	+100 kg
IJF Grand Prix
Gold medal – first place	2010 Rotterdam	+100 kg
Silver medal – second place	2009 Qingdao	+100 kg

Profile at external databases
- IJF: 1778
- JudoInside.com: 32499
- Updated on 25 July 2023

Hiroki Tachiyama (立山 広喜, Tachiyama Hiroki; born 24 November 1985 in Tamana District, Kumamoto) is a Japanese judoka. He won a bronze medal in the Openweight division at the 2010 World Judo Championships. A very strong judoka, he stands 1.93 cm and weighs 150 kg.
