= Karolina Tałach =

Polish judoka (born 1992)

Personal information
- Full name: Karolina Tałach-Gast
- Born: 3 September 1992 (age 33)
- Occupation: Judoka

Sport
- Country: Poland
- Sport: Judo
- Weight class: ‍–‍63 kg

Achievements and titles
- World Champ.: R32 (2017, 2018)
- European Champ.: 5th (2019)
Medal record
Women's judo
Representing Poland
IJF Grand Prix
Gold medal – first place	2016 Zagreb	‍–‍63 kg
Silver medal – second place	2018 Tbilisi	‍–‍63 kg
European U23 Championships
Bronze medal – third place	2013 Samokov	‍–‍70 kg
Summer Universiade
Silver medal – second place	2013 Kazan	Women's team

Profile at external databases
- IJF: 3887
- JudoInside.com: 61308
- Updated on 1 December 2022

Karolina Tałach (born 3 September 1992) is a Polish judoka.

Tałach is the gold medalist of the 2016 Judo Grand Prix Zagreb in the ‍–‍63 kg category.
