= 2006 European Cadet Judo Championships =

Judo competition

Judo 2006 European Cadet Judo Championships
- Location: Miskolc, Hungary
- Dates: 23–25 June 2006

Competition at external databases
- Links: JudoInside

The 2006 European Cadet Judo Championships is an edition of the European Cadet Judo Championships, organised by the International Judo Federation. It was held in Miskolc, Hungary from 23 to 25 June 2006.

== Medal summary ==
=== Medal table ===
* Host nation (Hungary)

Rank	Nation	Gold	Silver	Bronze	Total
1	Russia (RUS)	7	2	4	13
2	Hungary (HUN)*	3	2	1	6
3	Netherlands (NED)	2	0	1	3
4	Germany (GER)	1	2	6	9
5	Azerbaijan (AZE)	1	2	0	3
6	Italy (ITA)	1	1	0	2
7	Turkey (TUR)	1	0	4	5
8	Ukraine (UKR)	0	1	2	3
9	Croatia (CRO)	0	1	1	2
9	Great Britain (GBR)	0	1	1	2
11	Armenia (ARM)	0	1	0	1
11	Austria (AUT)	0	1	0	1
11	Czech Republic (CZE)	0	1	0	1
11	France (FRA)	0	1	0	1
15	Georgia (GEO)	0	0	4	4
16	Greece (GRE)	0	0	2	2
16	Israel (ISR)	0	0	2	2
18	Belgium (BEL)	0	0	1	1
18	Denmark (DEN)	0	0	1	1
18	Latvia (LAT)	0	0	1	1
18	Moldova (MDA)	0	0	1	1
Totals (21 entries)		16	16	32	64

=== Men's events ===
Event	Gold	Silver	Bronze
−50 kg	Sarkhan Ahmadov (AZE)	Ervand Mgdsyan (RUS)	Suren Mkrtchyan (UKR)
−50 kg	Sarkhan Ahmadov (AZE)	Ervand Mgdsyan (RUS)	Dimokritos Manousaridis (GRE)
−55 kg	Dmitry Sheremetiev (RUS)	Erik Gevorgyan (ARM)	Paata Merebashvili (GEO)
−55 kg	Dmitry Sheremetiev (RUS)	Erik Gevorgyan (ARM)	Vitalii Popovych (UKR)
−60 kg	Yunus Sastim (TUR)	Orkhan Dunyamaliyev (AZE)	Omar Akhmedov (RUS)
−60 kg	Yunus Sastim (TUR)	Orkhan Dunyamaliyev (AZE)	Kenneth Van Gansbeke (BEL)
−66 kg	Timur Bedoev (RUS)	Andrea Regis (ITA)	Vadim Guschin (ISR)
−66 kg	Timur Bedoev (RUS)	Andrea Regis (ITA)	Vadim Bocan (MDA)
−73 kg	Fedor Kirpichenkov (RUS)	Marc Odenthal (GER)	Sahin Tursak (TUR)
−73 kg	Fedor Kirpichenkov (RUS)	Marc Odenthal (GER)	Aigars Milenbergs (LAT)
−81 kg	Alan Khugaev (RUS)	Ramin Gurbanov (AZE)	Varlam Liparteliani (GEO)
−81 kg	Alan Khugaev (RUS)	Ramin Gurbanov (AZE)	Nicholas Gerlach (GER)
−90 kg	Pablo Tomasetti (ITA)	Lukáš Krpálek (CZE)	Sandro Tevdorashvili (GEO)
−90 kg	Pablo Tomasetti (ITA)	Lukáš Krpálek (CZE)	Sergey Kesaev (RUS)
+90 kg	Magomed Nazhmudinov (RUS)	André Breitbarth (GER)	Michalis Alexanidis (GRE)
+90 kg	Magomed Nazhmudinov (RUS)	André Breitbarth (GER)	Levan Mukeria (GEO)

=== Women's events ===
Event	Gold	Silver	Bronze
−40 kg	Natalia Mikhailova (RUS)	Lilla Erdelyi (HUN)	Svea Schwaebe (GER)
−40 kg	Natalia Mikhailova (RUS)	Lilla Erdelyi (HUN)	Gamze Aytekin (TUR)
−44 kg	Barbara Maros (HUN)	Lauriane Jamet (FRA)	Derya Cıbır (TUR)
−44 kg	Barbara Maros (HUN)	Lauriane Jamet (FRA)	Lusine Avakyan (RUS)
−48 kg	Linsey Verhagen (NED)	Lisa Schoenstein (AUT)	Kay Kraus (GER)
−48 kg	Linsey Verhagen (NED)	Lisa Schoenstein (AUT)	Shahar Levy (ISR)
−52 kg	Hedvig Karakas (HUN)	Andrea Bekic (CRO)	Maureen Groefsema (NED)
−52 kg	Hedvig Karakas (HUN)	Andrea Bekic (CRO)	Johanna Müller (GER)
−57 kg	Juul Franssen (NED)	Dóra Hegedus (HUN)	Cansu Dibekoglu (TUR)
−57 kg	Juul Franssen (NED)	Dóra Hegedus (HUN)	Alexandra Sebald (GER)
−63 kg	Irina Sordiya (RUS)	Olena Petrechenko (UKR)	Abigél Joó (HUN)
−63 kg	Irina Sordiya (RUS)	Olena Petrechenko (UKR)	Tine Moellerskov (DEN)
−70 kg	Zsuzsa Dávid (HUN)	Scarlett Woolcock (GBR)	Tia Berger (GER)
−70 kg	Zsuzsa Dávid (HUN)	Scarlett Woolcock (GBR)	Olga Pochkina (RUS)
+70 kg	Luise Malzahn (GER)	Regina Kapaeva (RUS)	Ivana Maranić (CRO)
+70 kg	Luise Malzahn (GER)	Regina Kapaeva (RUS)	Rebecca Telfer (GBR)

Source Results
