= Han Hee-ju =

South Korean judoka (born 1997)

Personal information
- Born: 2 September 1997 (age 28)
- Occupation: Judoka

Sport
- Country: South Korea
- Sport: Judo
- Weight class: ‍–‍63 kg, ‍–‍70 kg

Achievements and titles
- Olympic Games: R32 (2020)
- World Champ.: R16 (2021)
- Asian Champ.: (gold) (2021)
Medal record
Women's judo
Representing South Korea
Asian Games
Bronze medal – third place	2018 Jakarta	‍–‍63 kg
Asian Championships
Gold medal – first place	2021 Bishkek	‍–‍63 kg
IJF Grand Prix
Bronze medal – third place	2015 Ulaanbaatar	‍–‍63 kg
Asian Junior Championships
Gold medal – first place	2017 Bishkek	‍–‍63 kg
Asian Cadet Championships
Gold medal – first place	2013 Hainan	‍–‍63 kg
Gold medal – first place	2014 Hong Kong	‍–‍63 kg
Summer Universiade
Bronze medal – third place	2019 Naples	Women's team
Bronze medal – third place	2021 Chengdu	Women's team

Profile at external databases
- IJF: 11642
- JudoInside.com: 63019
- Updated on 16 December 2022

Han Hee-ju (Korean: 한희주, born 2 September 1997) is a South Korean judoka. She competed at the World Judo Championships in 2017 and in 2019 and on both occasions she was eliminated in her first match. At the 2021 World Championships Han reached the third round.

In 2018, Han won one of the bronze medals in the women's 63 kg event at the 2018 Asian Games held in Jakarta, Indonesia. In 2019, Han won one of the bronze medals in the women's team event at the 2019 Summer Universiade held in Naples, Italy. Han participated in the 2020 Summer Olympics in Tokyo, Japan.
