= Judo at the 2020 Summer Olympics – Women's 63 kg =

Judo competition

Women's 63 kg at the Games of the XXXII Olympiad
- Venue: Nippon Budokan
- Date: 27 July 2021
- Competitors: 31 from 31 nations

Medalists
1st place, gold medalist(s)		Clarisse Agbegnenou	France
2nd place, silver medalist(s)		Tina Trstenjak	Slovenia
3rd place, bronze medalist(s)		Maria Centracchio	Italy
3rd place, bronze medalist(s)		Catherine Beauchemin-Pinard	Canada

The women's 63 kg competition in judo at the 2020 Summer Olympics in Tokyo was held on 27 July 2021 at the Nippon Budokan.

== Results ==
=== Finals ===
Semi-finals
1 Clarisse Agbegnenou (FRA)	01
4 Catherine Beauchemin-Pinard (CAN)	00
2 Tina Trstenjak (SLO)	10
Maria Centracchio (ITA)	00

Gold medal
1 Clarisse Agbegnenou (FRA)	01
2 Tina Trstenjak (SLO)	00

=== Repechage ===
Repechage
8 Juul Franssen (NED)	10
5 Ketleyn Quadros (BRA)	00

Bronze medal
Maria Centracchio (ITA)	10
8 Juul Franssen (NED)	00

Repechage
Anriquelis Barrios (VEN)	01
Agata Ozdoba-Błach (POL)	00

Bronze medal
4 Catherine Beauchemin-Pinard (CAN)	01
Anriquelis Barrios (VEN)	00

=== Pool A ===
Round of 32
Farangiz Khojieva (UZB)	00
Sandrine Billiet (CPV)	10
8 Juul Franssen (NED)	10
Anja Obradović (SRB)	00
Katharina Haecker (AUS)	10
Gili Sharir (ISR)	00

Round of 16
1 Clarisse Agbegnenou (FRA)	10
Sandrine Billiet (CPV)	00
8 Juul Franssen (NED)	10
Katharina Haecker (AUS)	00

Quarter-finals
1 Clarisse Agbegnenou (FRA)	01
8 Juul Franssen (NED)	00

=== Pool B ===
Round of 32
4 Catherine Beauchemin-Pinard (CAN)	10
Lærke Olsen (DEN)	00
Magdalena Krssakova (AUT)	10
Yang Junxia (CHN)	00
5 Ketleyn Quadros (BRA)	W/O (Note: Cergia David did not pass the official weigh-in and did not take part in the competition.)
~~Cergia David (HON)~~
Prisca Awiti Alcaraz (MEX)	00
Gankhaich Bold (MGL)	10

Round of 16
4 Catherine Beauchemin-Pinard (CAN)	10
Magdalena Krssakova (AUT)	00
5 Ketleyn Quadros (BRA)	10
Gankhaich Bold (MGL)	00

Quarter-finals
4 Catherine Beauchemin-Pinard (CAN)	10
5 Ketleyn Quadros (BRA)	00

=== Pool C ===
Round of 32
2 Tina Trstenjak (SLO)	01
Han Hee-ju (KOR)	00
Cristina Cabaña Perez (ESP)	10
Kiyomi Watanabe (PHI)	00
7 Maylín del Toro Carvajal (CUB)	10
Muna Dahouk (EOR)	00
Anriquelis Barrios (VEN)	10
Daria Davydova (ROC)	00

Round of 16
2 Tina Trstenjak (SLO)	10
Cristina Cabaña Perez (ESP)	00
7 Maylín del Toro Carvajal (CUB)	00
Anriquelis Barrios (VEN)	10

Quarter-finals
2 Tina Trstenjak (SLO)	10
Anriquelis Barrios (VEN)	01

=== Pool D ===
Round of 32
3 Miku Tashiro (JPN)	01
Lucy Renshall (GBR)	00
Agata Ozdoba-Błach (POL)	10
Estefania Garcia (ECU)	00
6 Martyna Trajdos (GER)	00
Szofi Özbas (HUN)	01
Maria Centracchio (ITA)	10
Damiella Nomenjanahary (MAD)	00

Round of 16
3 Miku Tashiro (JPN)	00
Agata Ozdoba-Błach (POL)	10
Szofi Özbas (HUN)	00
Maria Centracchio (ITA)	11

Quarter-finals
Agata Ozdoba-Błach (POL)	00
Maria Centracchio (ITA)	10
