= Meriem Bjaoui =

Tunisian judoka (born 1996)

Personal information
- Born: 29 October 1996 (age 29)
- Occupation: Judoka

Sport
- Country: Tunisia
- Sport: Judo
- Weight class: –63 kg

Achievements and titles
- World Champ.: R63 (2014, 2018)
- African Champ.: (gold) (2016, 2018)
Medal record
Women's judo
Representing Tunisia
African Games
Bronze medal – third place	2015 Brazzaville	–63 kg
Bronze medal – third place	2019 Rabat	–63 kg
African Championships
Gold medal – first place	2016 Tunis	–63 kg
Gold medal – first place	2018 Tunis	–63 kg
Silver medal – second place	2017 Antananarivo	–63 kg
Bronze medal – third place	2021 Dakar	–63 kg
Bronze medal – third place	2022 Oran	–63 kg
African Junior Championships
Gold medal – first place	2015 Sharm El Sheikh	–63 kg
Gold medal – first place	2016 Casablanca	–63 kg
Bronze medal – third place	2014 Tunis	–57 kg
Mediterranean Games
Silver medal – second place	2018 Tarragona	–63 kg
Islamic Solidarity Games
Bronze medal – third place	2017 Baku	–63 kg

Profile at external databases
- IJF: 11141
- JudoInside.com: 90496
- Updated on 29 May 2022

Meriem Bjaoui is a Tunisian judoka. She is a two-time bronze medalist in the women's 63 kg event at the 2015 and 2019 African Games. She won the silver medal in the women's 63 kg event at the 2018 Mediterranean Games held in Tarragona, Spain.

She has also won medals at several editions of the African Judo Championships.

She won one of the bronze medals in the women's 63 kg event at the 2019 African Games held in Rabat, Morocco. At the 2021 African Judo Championships held in Dakar, Senegal, she won one of the bronze medals in her event.
