= Judo at the 2018 Asian Games – Women's 63 kg =

Judo competition

Women's 63 kg at the 2018 Asian Games
- Venue: Jakarta Convention Center
- Date: 30 August 2018
- Competitors: 14 from 14 nations

Medalists
gold medal	Nami Nabekura	Japan
silver medal	Kiyomi Watanabe	Philippines
bronze medal	Han Hee-ju	South Korea
bronze medal	Tang Jing	China

The women's 63 kilograms (Half middleweight) competition at the 2018 Asian Games in Jakarta was held on 30 August at the Jakarta Convention Center Assembly Hall.

Nami Nabekura of Japan won the gold medal.

== Schedule ==
All times are Western Indonesia Time (UTC+07:00)

Date	Time	Event
Thursday, 30 August 2018	09:00	Elimination round of 16
Thursday, 30 August 2018	09:00	Quarterfinals
Thursday, 30 August 2018	09:00	Repechage
Thursday, 30 August 2018	09:00	Semifinals
Thursday, 30 August 2018	16:00	Finals

== Results ==
=== Main bracket ===
Elimination round of 16
Phupu Lhamu Khatri (NEP)	00
Ardelia Yuli Fradivtha (INA)	01
Tang Jing (CHN)	01
Ri Pok-hyang (PRK)	00
Han Hee-ju (KOR)	10
Suellen Silva (LBN)	00
Iolanta Berdybekova (KAZ)	00
Orapin Senatham (THA)	10
Boldyn Gankhaich (MGL)	10
Nguyễn Ngọc Diễm Phương (VIE)	00
Chen Yun-ting (TPE)	11
Tang Lai Man (MAC)	00

Quarterfinals
Nami Nabekura (JPN)	10
Ardelia Yuli Fradivtha (INA)	00
Tang Jing (CHN)	10
Han Hee-ju (KOR)	00
Kiyomi Watanabe (PHI)	10
Orapin Senatham (THA)	00
Boldyn Gankhaich (MGL)	01
Chen Yun-ting (TPE)	00

Semifinals
Nami Nabekura (JPN)	10
Tang Jing (CHN)	00
Kiyomi Watanabe (PHI)	01
Boldyn Gankhaich (MGL)	00

Gold medal contest
Nami Nabekura (JPN)	10
Kiyomi Watanabe (PHI)	00

=== Repechage ===
Repechage
Ardelia Yuli Fradivtha (INA)	00
Han Hee-ju (KOR)	10
Orapin Senatham (THA)	00
Chen Yun-ting (TPE)	10

Bronze medal contests
Han Hee-ju (KOR)	01
Boldyn Gankhaich (MGL)	00
Chen Yun-ting (TPE)	00
Tang Jing (CHN)	10
