= 2021 African Judo Championships – Women's 63 kg =

Judo competition

Judo Women's 63 kg at the 2021 African Judo Championships
- Venue: Dakar Arena
- Location: Dakar, Senegal
- Date: 21 May 2021
- Competitors: 11 from 9 nations

Medalists
gold medal	Sarah Harachi	Morocco
silver medal	Sandrine Billiet	Cape Verde
bronze medal	Amina Belkadi	Algeria
bronze medal	Meriem Bjaoui	Tunisia

Competition at external databases
- Links: IJF • JudoInside

The women's 63 kg competition in at the 2021 African Judo Championships was held on 21 May at the Dakar Arena in Dakar, Senegal.

== Results ==
=== Main Round ===
Round of 16
Abdallah Salma (EGY)	00
Sarah Harachi (MAR)	11
Meriem Bjaoui (TUN)	10
Kadessa Tounkara (SEN)	00
Sandrine Billiet (CPV)	10
Aina Laura Rasoanaivo Razafy (MAD)	01

Quarterfinals
Amina Belkadi (ALG)	00
Sarah Harachi (MAR)	10
Damiella Nomenjanahary (MAD)	00
Enku Ekuta (NGR)	10
Hélène Wezeu Dombeu (CMR)	01
Meriem Bjaoui (TUN)	00
Sofia Belattar (MAR)	00
Sandrine Billiet (CPV)	10

Semifinals
Sarah Harachi (MAR)	11
Enku Ekuta (NGR)	00
Hélène Wezeu Dombeu (CMR)	00
Sandrine Billiet (CPV)	01

Final
Sarah Harachi (MAR)	10
Sandrine Billiet (CPV)	00

=== Repechage ===
Repechage		Bronze medal
Amina Belkadi (ALG)	10
Damiella Nomenjanahary (MAD)	00	Amina Belkadi (ALG)	10
		Hélène Wezeu Dombeu (CMR)	00

Repechage		Bronze medal
Meriem Bjaoui (TUN)	10
Sofia Belattar (MAR)	00	Meriem Bjaoui (TUN)	01
		Enku Ekuta (NGR)	00
