= Sanne Vermeer =

Dutch judoka (born 1998)

Personal information
- Nationality: Dutch
- Born: 25 March 1998 (age 28) Leeuwarden, Netherlands
- Occupation: Judoka

Sport
- Country: Netherlands
- Sport: Judo
- Weight class: –63 kg

Achievements and titles
- World Champ.: (bronze) (2021)
- European Champ.: (bronze) (2019, 2021)
Medal record
Women's judo
Representing the Netherlands
World Championships
| Bronze medal – third place | 2021 Budapest | ‍–‍63 kg |
European Games
| Bronze medal – third place | 2019 Minsk | ‍–‍63 kg |
European Championships
| Bronze medal – third place | 2021 Lisbon | ‍–‍63 kg |
World Masters
| Bronze medal – third place | 2021 Doha | ‍–‍63 kg |
IJF Grand Slam
| Silver medal – second place | 2021 Abu Dhabi | ‍–‍63 kg |
| Bronze medal – third place | 2021 Tel Aviv | ‍–‍63 kg |
| Bronze medal – third place | 2021 Kazan | ‍–‍63 kg |
| Bronze medal – third place | 2022 Paris | ‍–‍63 kg |
IJF Grand Prix
| Gold medal – first place | 2019 Tbilisi | ‍–‍63 kg |
| Gold medal – first place | 2024 Zagreb | ‍–‍70 kg |
| Bronze medal – third place | 2017 The Hague | ‍–‍63 kg |
| Bronze medal – third place | 2019 Tel Aviv | ‍–‍63 kg |
| Bronze medal – third place | 2019 Zagreb | ‍–‍63 kg |
World Juniors Championships
| Gold medal – first place | 2018 Nassau | ‍–‍63 kg |
| Silver medal – second place | 2017 Zagreb | ‍–‍63 kg |
European Junior Championships
| Gold medal – first place | 2016 Málaga | ‍–‍63 kg |
| Gold medal – first place | 2017 Maribor | ‍–‍63 kg |
World Cadets Championships
| Gold medal – first place | 2015 Sarajevo | ‍–‍63 kg |

Profile at external databases
- IJF: 19301
- JudoInside.com: 67266
- Updated on 17 September 2024

Sanne Vermeer (born 25 March 1998) is a Dutch judoka. She is a bronze medalist in the women's 63 kg event at the 2021 World Judo Championships and the 2021 European Judo Championships. In 2019, she also won one of the bronze medals in her event at the European Games held in Minsk, Belarus.

== Career ==
Vermeer won the gold medal in the women's 63 kg event at the 2015 World Judo Cadets Championships held in Sarajevo, Bosnia and Herzegovina. She also won the gold medal in her event at the 2016 European Junior Judo Championships held in Málaga, Spain and the 2017 European Junior Judo Championships held in Maribor, Slovenia. At the 2017 World Judo Juniors Championships in Zagreb, Croatia, she won the silver medal in her event.

Vermeer competed in the women's 63 kg and women's team events at the 2017 European Judo Championships held in Warsaw, Poland. In the same year, she won one of the bronze medals in the women's 63 kg event at the Judo Grand Prix The Hague held in The Hague, Netherlands.

In 2018, Vermeer won the gold medal in her event at the World Judo Juniors Championships held in Nassau, The Bahamas. A few days later, she was eliminated in her second match in the women's 63 kg event at the World Judo Championships held in Baku, Azerbaijan. A year later, Vermeer lost her bronze medal match in the women's 63 kg event at the 2019 World Judo Championships held in Tokyo, Japan.

In January 2021, Vermeer won one of the bronze medals in her event at the Judo World Masters held in Doha, Qatar. A few months later, she won one of the bronze medals in the women's 63 kg event at the 2021 European Judo Championships held in Lisbon, Portugal. Vermeer was not selected as one of the judoka to represent the Netherlands at the 2020 Summer Olympics in Tokyo, Japan which turned her year's focus to the 2021 World Judo Championships in Budapest, Hungary. She reached the semi-finals in the women's 63 kg event where she lost against the eventual gold medalist Clarisse Agbegnenou of France. Vermeer then secured the bronze medal by defeating Ketleyn Quadros of Brazil. At the 2021 Judo Grand Slam Abu Dhabi held in Abu Dhabi, United Arab Emirates, she won the silver medal in her event.

Vermeer won one of the bronze medals in her event at the 2022 Judo Grand Slam Paris held in Paris, France.
