= Judo at the 2018 Mediterranean Games – Women's 63 kg =

Judo competitions

Women's 63 kg at the 2018 Mediterranean Games
- Venue: Cambrils Pavilion
- Date: 28 June
- Competitors: 10 from 10 nations

Medalists
gold medal	Edwige Gwend	Italy
silver medal	Meriem Bjaoui	Tunisia
bronze medal	Manon Deketer	France
bronze medal	Büşra Katipoğlu	Turkey

The women's 63 kg competition in judo at the 2018 Mediterranean Games was held on 28 June at the Cambrils Pavilion in Cambrils.

== Schedule ==
All times are Central European Summer Time (UTC+2).

Date	Time	Round
June 28, 2018	10:56	Round of 16
June 28, 2018	12:08	Quarterfinals
June 28, 2018	13:12	Semifinals
June 28, 2018	14:24	Repechage
June 28, 2018	17:16	Bronze medal
June 28, 2018	17:24	Final

== Results ==
=== Main Round ===
Round of 16
Andjela Samardžić (BIH)	00
Manon Deketer (FRA)	10
Jovana Obradović (SRB)	10
Laura Fazliu (KOS)	00

Quarterfinals
Edwige Gwend (ITA)	10
Manon Deketer (FRA)	00
Büşra Katipoğlu (TUR)	01
Isabel Puche (ESP)	00
Sofia Belattar (MAR)	01
Jovana Obradović (SRB)	10
Meriem Bjaoui (TUN)	01
Amina Belkadi (ALG)	00

Semifinals
Edwige Gwend (ITA)	01
Büşra Katipoğlu (TUR)	00
Jovana Obradović (SRB)	00
Meriem Bjaoui (TUN)	11

Final
Edwige Gwend (ITA)	10
Meriem Bjaoui (TUN)	00

=== Repechage ===
Repechage 1	Repechage 2		Bronze medal
	Manon Deketer (FRA)	01
	Isabel Puche (ESP)	00
			Manon Deketer (FRA)	11
			Jovana Obradović (SRB)	00

Repechage 1		Repechage 2		Bronze medal
Laura Fazliu (KOS)	10
Sofia Belattar (MAR)	00	Laura Fazliu (KOS)	10
		Amina Belkadi (ALG)	00
				Laura Fazliu (KOS)	00
				Büşra Katipoğlu (TUR)	10
