= Johanna Müller =

German judoka (born 1991)

Personal information
- Born: 9 January 1990 (age 36)
- Occupation: Judoka
- Website: www.johanna-mueller-judo.de

Sport
- Country: Germany
- Sport: Judo
- Weight class: ‍–‍57 kg

Achievements and titles
- World Champ.: R64 (2013)
Medal record
Women's judo
Representing Germany
IJF Grand Slam
Bronze medal – third place	2016 Abu Dhabi	‍–‍57 kg
IJF Grand Prix
Silver medal – second place	2013 Samsun	‍–‍57 kg
Bronze medal – third place	2015 Zagreb	‍–‍57 kg
European Cadet Championships
Bronze medal – third place	2006 Miskolc	‍–‍52 kg

Profile at external databases
- IJF: 1236
- JudoInside.com: 39040
- Updated on 25 November 2022

Johanna Müller (born 9 January 1991) is a German judoka.

Müller is a bronze medalist from the 2016 Judo Grand Slam Abu Dhabi in the ‍–‍57 kg category.
