= Camila Minakawa =

Brazilian-Israeli judoka (born 1990)

Personal information
- Born: 3 July 1990 (age 35)
- Occupation: Judoka

Sport
- Country: Brazil (until 2013); Israel (since 2013)
- Sport: Judo
- Weight class: ‍–‍57 kg, ‍–‍63 kg

Achievements and titles
- World Champ.: 7th (2013)
- European Champ.: R16 (2015)
Medal record
Women's judo
Representing Israel
IJF Grand Prix
Silver medal – second place	2013 Almaty	‍–‍57 kg
Silver medal – second place	2014 Tashkent	‍–‍57 kg
Representing Brazil
IJF Grand Slam
Bronze medal – third place	2012 Rio de Janeiro	‍–‍57 kg
World Juniors Championships
Bronze medal – third place	2008 Bangkok	‍–‍63 kg

Profile at external databases
- IJF: 2466
- JudoInside.com: 49873
- Updated on 20 November 2024

Camila Minakawa (born 3 July 1990) is a Brazilian-Israeli judoka.

Minakawa, who was born in Brazil to a Jewish mother, made aliyah in 2013 and started representing Israel.

Minakawa won silver medals at the 2013 Almaty Grand Prix and the 2014 Tashkent Grand Prix.
