= 2009 European Junior Judo Championships =

Judo competition

Judo 2009 European Junior Judo Championships
- Location: Yerevan, Armenia
- Dates: 11–13 September 2009

Competition at external databases
- Links: EJU • JudoInside

The 2009 European Junior Judo Championships is an edition of the European Junior Judo Championships, organised by the European Judo Union.It was held in Yerevan, Armenia from 11 to 13 September 2009.

== Medal summary ==
=== Medal table ===
* Host nation (Armenia)

Rank	Nation	Gold	Silver	Bronze	Total
1	Ukraine (UKR)	2	2	3	7
2	France (FRA)	2	1	3	6
3	Hungary (HUN)	2	1	1	4
4	Russia (RUS)	2	0	3	5
5	Belgium (BEL)	2	0	0	2
6	Azerbaijan (AZE)	1	1	3	5
6	Italy (ITA)	1	1	3	5
8	Armenia (ARM)*	1	0	2	3
8	Georgia (GEO)	1	0	2	3
10	Albania (ALB)	1	0	0	1
10	Sweden (SWE)	1	0	0	1
12	Estonia (EST)	0	2	0	2
13	Netherlands (NED)	0	1	3	4
14	Romania (ROU)	0	1	2	3
14	Turkey (TUR)	0	1	2	3
16	Czech Republic (CZE)	0	1	0	1
16	Greece (GRE)	0	1	0	1
16	Latvia (LAT)	0	1	0	1
16	Slovenia (SLO)	0	1	0	1
16	Spain (ESP)	0	1	0	1
21	Austria (AUT)	0	0	2	2
21	Poland (POL)	0	0	2	2
23	Belarus (BLR)	0	0	1	1
Totals (23 entries)		16	16	32	64

=== Men's events ===
Event	Gold	Silver	Bronze
−55 kg	Viktor Achkinazi (RUS)	Ilgar Mushkiyev (AZE)	Gevorg Khachatrian (UKR)
−55 kg	Viktor Achkinazi (RUS)	Ilgar Mushkiyev (AZE)	David Mkrtchyan (ARM)
−60 kg	Paata Merebashvili (GEO)	Florent Urani (FRA)	Rasim Asadullayev (AZE)
−60 kg	Paata Merebashvili (GEO)	Florent Urani (FRA)	Tigran Varosyan (ARM)
−66 kg	Artem Bulyga (UKR)	Enrico Parlati (ITA)	Mathias Boucher (FRA)
−66 kg	Artem Bulyga (UKR)	Enrico Parlati (ITA)	Fagan Eminoglu (AZE)
−73 kg	Artyom Baghdasaryan (ARM)	David Tsokouris (GRE)	Andrea Regis (ITA)
−73 kg	Artyom Baghdasaryan (ARM)	David Tsokouris (GRE)	Nugzar Tatalashvili (GEO)
−81 kg	Loïc Pietri (FRA)	Aigars Milenbergs (LAT)	Ramin Gurbanov (AZE)
−81 kg	Loïc Pietri (FRA)	Aigars Milenbergs (LAT)	Avtandili Tchrikishvili (GEO)
−90 kg	Marcus Nyman (SWE)	Grigori Minaškin (EST)	Quedjau Nhabali (UKR)
−90 kg	Marcus Nyman (SWE)	Grigori Minaškin (EST)	Pablo Tomasetti (ITA)
−100 kg	Elmar Gasimov (AZE)	Lukáš Krpálek (CZE)	Dmytro Luchyn (UKR)
−100 kg	Elmar Gasimov (AZE)	Lukáš Krpálek (CZE)	Tomasz Domanski (POL)
+100 kg	Sergey Kesaev (RUS)	Juhan Mettis (EST)	Domenico Di Guida (ITA)
+100 kg	Sergey Kesaev (RUS)	Juhan Mettis (EST)	Vlăduț Simionescu (ROU)

=== Women's events ===
Event	Gold	Silver	Bronze
−44 kg	Anne-Sophie Jura (BEL)	Diana Kovacs (ROU)	Lilla Erdelyi (HUN)
−44 kg	Anne-Sophie Jura (BEL)	Diana Kovacs (ROU)	Ebru Sahin (TUR)
−48 kg	Charline Van Snick (BEL)	Derya Cıbır (TUR)	Ioana Matei (ROU)
−48 kg	Charline Van Snick (BEL)	Derya Cıbır (TUR)	Louise Raynaud (FRA)
−52 kg	Majlinda Kelmendi (ALB)	Barbara Maros (HUN)	Alessia Staraverava (BLR)
−52 kg	Majlinda Kelmendi (ALB)	Barbara Maros (HUN)	Tina Zeltner (AUT)
−57 kg	Hedvig Karakas (HUN)	Lyudmyla Marchenko (UKR)	Juul Franssen (NED)
−57 kg	Hedvig Karakas (HUN)	Lyudmyla Marchenko (UKR)	Pari Surakatova (RUS)
−63 kg	Edwige Gwend (ITA)	Nina Milošević (SLO)	Caroline Peschaud (FRA)
−63 kg	Edwige Gwend (ITA)	Nina Milošević (SLO)	Büşra Katipoğlu (TUR)
−70 kg	Abigél Joó (HUN)	Kim Polling (NED)	Bernadette Graf (AUT)
−70 kg	Abigél Joó (HUN)	Kim Polling (NED)	Daria Davydova (RUS)
−78 kg	Audrey Tcheuméo (FRA)	Ivanna Makukha (UKR)	Martine Demkes (NED)
−78 kg	Audrey Tcheuméo (FRA)	Ivanna Makukha (UKR)	Regina Kapaeva (RUS)
+78 kg	Iryna Kindzerska (UKR)	Sara Alvarez Folgueira (ESP)	Janine Penders (NED)
+78 kg	Iryna Kindzerska (UKR)	Sara Alvarez Folgueira (ESP)	Joanna Jaworska (POL)

Source Results
