= Judo at the 2019 Pan American Games – Women's 63 kg =

Women's 63 kg at the 2019 Pan American Games
- Venue: Polideportivo 3
- Dates: August 10
- Competitors: 10 from 10 nations

Medalists
Gold medal	Maylín del Toro	Cuba
Silver medal	Anriquelis Barrios	Venezuela
Bronze medal	Aléxia Castilhos	Brazil
Bronze medal	Hannah Martin	United States

The women's 63 kg competition of the judo events at the 2019 Pan American Games in Lima, Peru, was held on August 10 at the Polideportivo 3.

== Results ==
All times are local (UTC−5)

=== Bracket ===
Round of 16
Madeline Choconta (COL)	01S2
Ariana Cornejo (PER)	00S2
Agustina De Lucía (ARG)	10
Cergia David (HON)	00S3

Quarter Finals
Maylín del Toro (CUB)	10
Madeline Choconta (COL)	00
Estefania García (ECU)	00S2
Prisca Awiti (MEX)	01S1
Anriquelis Barrios (VEN)	01
Agustina De Lucía (ARG)	00S2
Aléxia Castilhos (BRA)	01S2
Hannah Martin (USA)	00S2

Semi Finals
Maylín del Toro (CUB)	01S1
Prisca Awiti (MEX)	00S2
Anriquelis Barrios (VEN)	10
Aléxia Castilhos (BRA)	00

Final
Maylín del Toro (CUB)	01S2
Anriquelis Barrios (VEN)	00S1

=== Repechage round ===
Two bronze medals were awarded.

Repechage		Bronze medal
Madeline Choconta (COL)	00S3
Estefania García (ECU)	10S2	Estefania García (ECU)	00S1
		Aléxia Castilhos (BRA)	01S1

Repechage		Bronze medal
Agustina De Lucía (ARG)	00S3
Hannah Martin (USA)	10S1	Hannah Martin (USA)	10
		Prisca Awiti (MEX)	00
