= 2009 Judo Grand Prix Qingdao =

Judo competition

Judo 2009 Judo Grand Prix Qingdao
- Location: Qingdao, China
- Dates: 28–29 November 2009
- Competitors: 158 from 17 nations

Competition at external databases
- Links: IJF • JudoInside

The 2009 Judo Grand Prix Qingdao was held in Qingdao, China from 28 to 29 November 2009.

== Medal summary ==
=== Men's events ===
| Event | Gold | Silver | Bronze |
|---|---|---|---|
| Extra-lightweight (−60 kg) | He Yunlong (CHN) | Jeroen Mooren (NED) | Kim Dong-yong (KOR) |
| Extra-lightweight (−60 kg) | He Yunlong (CHN) | Jeroen Mooren (NED) | Song Kang-ho (PRK) |
| Half-lightweight (−66 kg) | Sanjaasürengiin Miyaaragchaa (MGL) | Liu Renwang (CHN) | Hong Chol-jun (PRK) |
| Half-lightweight (−66 kg) | Sanjaasürengiin Miyaaragchaa (MGL) | Liu Renwang (CHN) | Sasha Mehmedovic (CAN) |
| Lightweight (−73 kg) | Bang Gui-man (KOR) | Dirk Van Tichelt (BEL) | Pak Chol-min (PRK) |
| Lightweight (−73 kg) | Bang Gui-man (KOR) | Dirk Van Tichelt (BEL) | Kiyoshi Uematsu (ESP) |
| Half-middleweight (−81 kg) | Ha Ji-soo (KOR) | Hatem Abd el Akher (EGY) | Mohamed Darwish (EGY) |
| Half-middleweight (−81 kg) | Ha Ji-soo (KOR) | Hatem Abd el Akher (EGY) | Emmanuel Lucenti (ARG) |
| Middleweight (−90 kg) | Hesham Mesbah (EGY) | David Alarza (ESP) | Batbayar Sainjargal (MGL) |
| Middleweight (−90 kg) | Hesham Mesbah (EGY) | David Alarza (ESP) | Cheng Xunzhao (CHN) |
| Half-heavyweight (−100 kg) | Ramadan Darwish (EGY) | Danny Meeuwsen (NED) | Cheon Choi (KOR) |
| Half-heavyweight (−100 kg) | Ramadan Darwish (EGY) | Danny Meeuwsen (NED) | Yuan Jinling (CHN) |
| Heavyweight (+100 kg) | Keiji Suzuki (JPN) | Hiroki Tachiyama (JPN) | Islam El Shehaby (EGY) |
| Heavyweight (+100 kg) | Keiji Suzuki (JPN) | Hiroki Tachiyama (JPN) | Grim Vuijsters (NED) |

=== Women's events ===
| Event | Gold | Silver | Bronze |
|---|---|---|---|
| Extra-lightweight (−48 kg) | Shoko Ibe (JPN) | Shin Seung-min (KOR) | Kim Young-ran (KOR) |
| Extra-lightweight (−48 kg) | Shoko Ibe (JPN) | Shin Seung-min (KOR) | Laëtitia Payet (FRA) |
| Half-lightweight (−52 kg) | He Hongmei (CHN) | Ana Carrascosa (ESP) | Kitty Bravik (NED) |
| Half-lightweight (−52 kg) | He Hongmei (CHN) | Ana Carrascosa (ESP) | Melanie Lierka (GER) |
| Lightweight (−57 kg) | Sarah Loko (FRA) | Hitomi Tokuhisa (JPN) | Weiwei Chen (CHN) |
| Lightweight (−57 kg) | Sarah Loko (FRA) | Hitomi Tokuhisa (JPN) | Zhu Guirong (CHN) |
| Half-middleweight (−63 kg) | Miki Tanaka (JPN) | Gévrise Émane (FRA) | Yarden Gerbi (ISR) |
| Half-middleweight (−63 kg) | Miki Tanaka (JPN) | Gévrise Émane (FRA) | Anicka van Emden (NED) |
| Middleweight (−70 kg) | Asuka Oka (JPN) | Mylène Chollet (FRA) | Juliane Robra (SUI) |
| Middleweight (−70 kg) | Asuka Oka (JPN) | Mylène Chollet (FRA) | Yao Yuting (CHN) |
| Half-heavyweight (−78 kg) | Yang Xiuli (CHN) | Lucie Louette (FRA) | Luise Malzahn (GER) |
| Half-heavyweight (−78 kg) | Yang Xiuli (CHN) | Lucie Louette (FRA) | Raquel Prieto (ESP) |
| Heavyweight (+78 kg) | Qin Qian (CHN) | Yu Song (CHN) | Lulu Luan (CHN) |
| Heavyweight (+78 kg) | Qin Qian (CHN) | Yu Song (CHN) | Xiaowei Wu (CHN) |

Source Results

=== Medal table ===
* Host nation (China)

| Rank | Nation | Gold | Silver | Bronze | Total |
|---|---|---|---|---|---|
| 1 | China (CHN)* | 4 | 2 | 7 | 13 |
| 2 | Japan (JPN) | 4 | 2 | 0 | 6 |
| 3 | South Korea (KOR) | 2 | 1 | 3 | 6 |
| 4 | Egypt (EGY) | 2 | 1 | 2 | 5 |
| 5 | France (FRA) | 1 | 3 | 1 | 5 |
| 6 | Mongolia (MGL) | 1 | 0 | 1 | 2 |
| 7 | Netherlands (NED) | 0 | 2 | 3 | 5 |
| 8 | Spain (ESP) | 0 | 2 | 2 | 4 |
| 9 | Belgium (BEL) | 0 | 1 | 0 | 1 |
| 10 | North Korea (PRK) | 0 | 0 | 3 | 3 |
| 11 | Germany (GER) | 0 | 0 | 2 | 2 |
| 12 | Argentina (ARG) | 0 | 0 | 1 | 1 |
| 12 | Canada (CAN) | 0 | 0 | 1 | 1 |
| 12 | Israel (ISR) | 0 | 0 | 1 | 1 |
| 12 | Switzerland (SUI) | 0 | 0 | 1 | 1 |
| Totals (15 entries) | | 14 | 14 | 28 | 56 |
