= Judo at the 2010 South American Games – Women's team =

The Women's Team event at the 2010 South American Games was held on March 22.

== Medalists ==
Gold	Silver	Bronze	
Steffany Garatejo; Yuri Alvear; Yadinya Rocha; Yulieth Sánchez; Luz Álvarez; Diana Velasco; Anny Cortez; Colombia	Steffani Lupetti; Daniela Polzin; Priscila Silva; Catiere Toledo; Ketleyn Quadros; Laisa Santana; Andressa Fernandes; Glaucia Lima; Brazil	Diana Johanna Rivera; Ibith Farez; Joselin Guiracocha; Vanessa Minda; Diana Belen Morales; Diana Zamora; Carmen Quilumba; Ecuador	Keivi Pinto; Luciana Castillo; Yelitza Morillo; Anriquelis Barrios; María Elena Rojas; Ysis Barreto; Wisneybi Machado; Giovanna Blanco; Venezuela

== Results ==
=== Round robin ===
Class	Athlete	Contest			Points		
Class	Athlete	Pld	W	L	W	L	Diff
1st place, gold medalist(s)	Colombia	3	3	0	15	3	+12
2nd place, silver medalist(s)	Brazil	3	2	1	12	9	+3
3rd place, bronze medalist(s)	Ecuador	3	1	2	6	13	-7
3rd place, bronze medalist(s)	Venezuela	3	0	3	5	13	-8

=== Contests ===
1	Colombia	45	—	10	Ecuador
2	Colombia	60	—	5	Brazil
3	Colombia	40	—	10	Venezuela
4	Brazil	47	—	20	Venezuela
5	Ecuador	30	—	20	Venezuela
6	Ecuador	10	—	52	Brazil
