= 2010 World Team Judo Championships – Men's team =

Judo competition

Judo Men's team at the 2010 World Team Judo Championships
- Location: Antalya, Turkey
- Dates: 31 October 2010

Medalists
gold medal	Japan (4th title)
silver medal	Brazil
bronze medal	Russia
bronze medal	South Korea

Competition at external databases
- Links: EJU • JudoInside

The men's team competition at the 2010 World Team Judo Championships was held on 31 October in Antalya, Turkey.

== Results ==
Quarter-finals
Japan	3
Russia	2
Georgia	2
South Korea	3
France	1
Brazil	4
Mongolia	2
Turkey	3

Semi-finals
Japan	3
South Korea	2
Brazil	5
Turkey	0

Final
Japan	4
Brazil	1

=== Repechage ===
Repechage
Russia	4
Georgia	1

Third place
Russia	3
Turkey	2

Repechage
France	3
Mongolia	2

Third place
France	1
South Korea	4
