= Sandrine Billiet =

Belgian-Cape Verdean judoka (born 1990)

Sandrine Billiet OLY
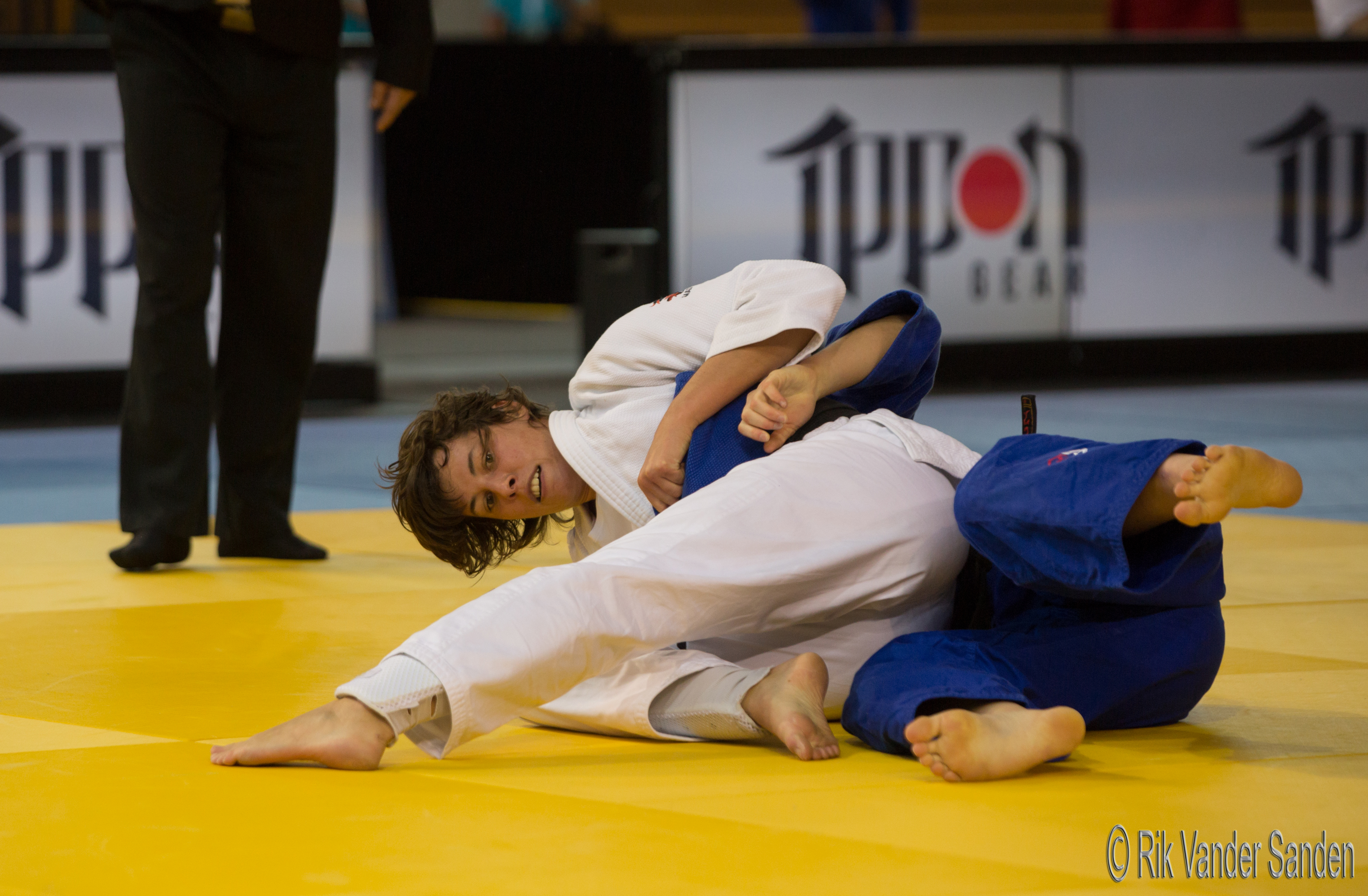
- Luxembourg 2019

Personal information
- Born: 16 February 1990 (age 36) Bruges, Belgium
- Occupation: Judoka

Sport
- Country: Belgium (until 2018); Cape Verde (since 2019)
- Sport: Judo
- Weight class: ‍–‍63 kg

Achievements and titles
- Olympic Games: R16 (2020)
- World Champ.: R32 (2021, 2024)
- African Champ.: (silver) (2021)
Medal record
Women's judo
Representing Cape Verde
African Championships
Silver medal – second place	2021 Dakar	‍–‍63 kg
Bronze medal – third place	2024 Cairo	‍–‍63 kg

Profile at external databases
- IJF: 56188, 17369
- JudoInside.com: 55619
- Updated on 21 May 2024

2014 - Belgian Black Belts (Road to Rio 2016)

Celje 2013 - Judo

Sandrine Billiet (born 16 February 1990) is a Belgian-Cape Verdean judoka who competes in the women's 63 kg class.

== Career ==
=== Belgium ===
Billiet competed for Belgium at the 2014 European Judo Championships and 2017 Judo Grand Prix.

=== Cape Verde ===
Since 2019, Billiet has represented Cape Verde. She participated at 2019 World Judo Championships,

At the 2021 African Judo Championships held in Dakar, Senegal, she won the silver medal in the women's 63 kg event. She competed at the 2020 Summer Olympics held in Tokyo, Japan.
