= 2010 World Team Judo Championships =

Judo competition

2010 Judo World Team Judo Championships
- Location: Antalya, Turkey
- Dates: 30–31 October

Champions
- Men's team: Japan (4th title)
- Women's team: Netherlands (1st title)

Competition at external databases
- Links: EJU • JudoInside

The 2010 World Team Judo Championships were held in Antalya, Turkey from 30 to 31 October 2010.

== Medal summary ==
Event	Gold	Silver	Bronze
Men's team	Japan; Musashi Ogura; Masahiko Otsuka; Masahiro Takamatsu; Masashi Nishiyama; Hiroki Tachiyama; Masashi Kodera; Ryo Saito; Kazushi Nishioka	Brazil; Alex Wilian Pombo; Bruno Mendonça; Flávio Canto; Rodrigo Luna; Rafael Silva; David Moura	South Korea; Jo Jun-Ho; Bang Gwi-Man; Hong Seok-Ung; Gwon Yeong-U; Kim Seong-Min
Men's team	Japan; Musashi Ogura; Masahiko Otsuka; Masahiro Takamatsu; Masashi Nishiyama; Hiroki Tachiyama; Masashi Kodera; Ryo Saito; Kazushi Nishioka	Brazil; Alex Wilian Pombo; Bruno Mendonça; Flávio Canto; Rodrigo Luna; Rafael Silva; David Moura	Russia; Mikhail Pulyayev; Murat Kodzokov; Murat Khabachirov; Kirill Voprosov; Dmitry Sterkhov; Ulan Gurtuev; Arsen Pshmakhov; Viktor Semenov; Aslan Kambiyev
Women's team	Netherlands; Kitty Bravik; Juul Franssen; Elisabeth Willeboordse; Linda Bolder; Carola Uilenhoed; Anicka van Emden; Marhinde Verkerk	Germany; Susi Zimmermann; Miryam Roper; Claudia Malzahn; Iljana Marzok; Heide Wollert	Japan; Yuka Nishida; Chie Iwata; Miki Tanaka; Mina Watanabe; Aya Ishiyama; Nae Udaka; Ikumi Tanimoto; Asuka Oka; Mai Tateyama
Women's team	Netherlands; Kitty Bravik; Juul Franssen; Elisabeth Willeboordse; Linda Bolder; Carola Uilenhoed; Anicka van Emden; Marhinde Verkerk	Germany; Susi Zimmermann; Miryam Roper; Claudia Malzahn; Iljana Marzok; Heide Wollert	Turkey; Aynur Samat; Tugba Zehir; Büşra Katipoğlu; Seyda Bayram; Belkıs Kaya; Seda Karadağ; Gülşah Kocatürk
