= 2010 World Team Judo Championships – Women's team =

Judo competition

Judo Women's team at the 2010 World Team Judo Championships
- Location: Antalya, Turkey
- Dates: 30 October 2010

Medalists
gold medal	Netherlands (1st title)
silver medal	Germany
bronze medal	Japan
bronze medal	Turkey

Competition at external databases
- Links: EJU • JudoInside

The women's team competition at the 2010 World Team Judo Championships was held on 31 October in Antalya, Turkey.

== Results ==
Quarter-finals
Brazil	2
France	3
Germany	3
China	2
Japan	3
Turkey	2
Netherlands	5
Mongolia	0

Semi-finals
France	2
Germany	3
Japan	2
Netherlands	3

Final
Germany	2
Netherlands	3

=== Repechage ===
Repechage
Brazil	4
China	1

Third place
Brazil	0
Japan	5

Repechage
Turkey	5
Mongolia	0

Third place
Turkey	3
France	2
