= Tina Reiter =

Austrian judoka (born 1992)

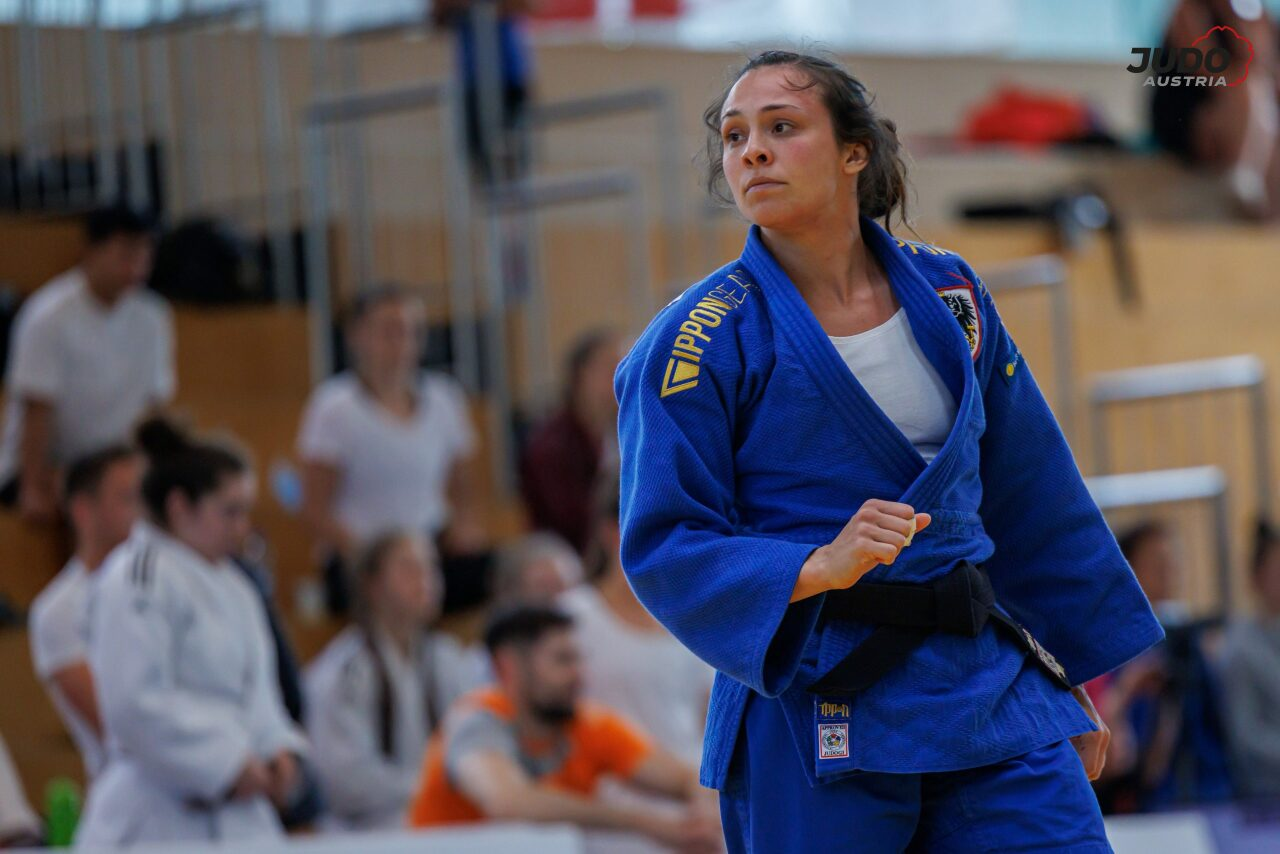
- Reiter in blue

Personal information
- Born: Tina Zeltner; 23 December 1992 (age 33) Neunkirchen
- Occupation: Judoka
- Employer: Austrian Armed Forces
- Height: 160 cm (5 ft 3 in)
- Spouse: Georg Reiter

Sport
- Country: Austria
- Sport: Judo
- Weight class: ‍–‍57 kg, ‍–‍63 kg
- Rank: 2nd dan black belt
- League: Frauen Judo Bundesliga
- Club: JC Wimpassing; UJZ Mühlviertel (since 2023)
- Coached by: Adolf Zeltner

Achievements and titles
- World Champ.: R16 (2014)
- European Champ.: 7th (2018)
Medal record
Women's judo
Representing Austria
IJF Grand Prix
Silver medal – second place	2012 Abu Dhabi	‍–‍57 kg
Bronze medal – third place	2013 Samsun	‍–‍57 kg
Bronze medal – third place	2014 Ulaanbaatar	‍–‍57 kg
Bronze medal – third place	2015 Zagreb	‍–‍57 kg
World Juniors Championships
Bronze medal – third place	2011 Cape Town	‍–‍57 kg
European Junior Championships
Silver medal – second place	2010 Samokov	‍–‍52 kg
Bronze medal – third place	2009 Yerevan	‍–‍52 kg
European Cadet Championships
Bronze medal – third place	2008 Sarajevo	‍–‍57 kg

Profile at external databases
- IJF: 1683
- JudoInside.com: 45836
- Updated on 11 August 2024

Tina Reiter (née Zeltner born 23 December 1992 in Neunkirchen) is an Austrian judoka. She holds the nidan.

== Judo career ==
Tina Zeltner graduated from the Bundesgymnasium Zehnergasse. She fights for the JC Wimpassing. She won the silver medal at the World Cup in Tallinn in 2012. Zeltner was a member of the Army Performance Sports Center's squad from 2012.

She left the Heeressportzentrum in 2016.

== Club championships ==
Together with the UJZ Mühlviertel team, she fought in the women's judo league in 2023. In the first round, on June 4, 2023, she was able to win three of her four fights early.

== Achievements ==
Zeltner achieved the following successes in the 57 kg weight class:

- 1st place 2012 World Cup San Salvador
- 1st place Austrian national champion 2009, 2010, 2017
- 2nd place 2012 Judo Grand Prix Abu Dhabi
- 2nd place 2012 PJC World Cup Tallinn
- 2nd place 2012 PJC World Cup Miami
- 2nd place 2012 PJC World Cup Bucharest
- 2nd place 2010 European Junior Judo Championships (Samokow)
- 3rd place 2015 Judo Grand Prix Zagreb
- 3rd place 2014 Judo Grand Prix Ulaanbaatar
- 3rd place 2013 Judo Grand Prix Samsun
- 3rd place 2011 World Judo Juniors Championships (Cape Town)
- 3rd place 2009 European Junior Judo Championships (Yerevan)

== Personal life ==
Zeltner is in a relationship with Georg. They have two children together. They married in 2023.

She taught at the Prambachkirchen elementary school.
