= Alexia Castilhos =

Brazilian judoka (born 1995)

Aléxia Castilhos
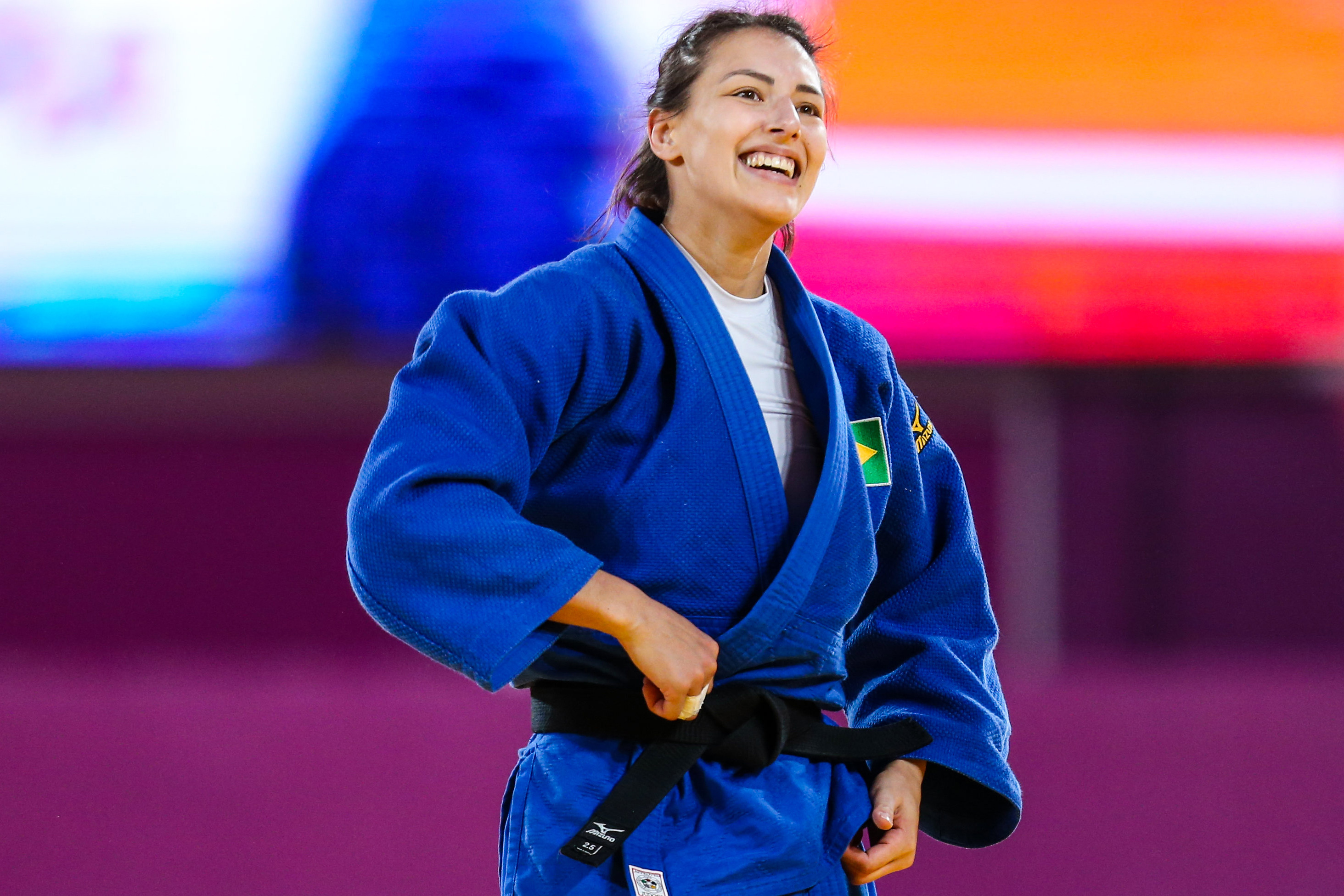
- Castilhos in 2019

Personal information
- Full name: Aléxia Taís Willrich Castilhos
- Born: 13 February 1995 (age 31) Porto Alegre, Brazil
- Occupation: Judoka
- Height: 171 cm (5 ft 7 in)

Sport
- Country: Brazil
- Sport: Judo
- Weight class: ‍–‍63 kg

Achievements and titles
- World Champ.: R16 (2021)
- Pan American Champ.: (2018)
Medal record
Women's judo
Representing Brazil
Pan American Games
Silver medal – second place	2023 Santiago	Mixed team
Bronze medal – third place	2019 Lima	‍–‍63 kg
Pan American Championships
Bronze medal – third place	2018 San José	‍–‍63 kg
IJF Grand Slam
Silver medal – second place	2019 Brasilia	‍–‍63 kg
IJF Grand Prix
Bronze medal – third place	2018 Antalya	‍–‍63 kg
Bronze medal – third place	2018 Zagreb	‍–‍63 kg
Bronze medal – third place	2018 Cancún	‍–‍63 kg
Bronze medal – third place	2019 Montreal	‍–‍63 kg

Profile at external databases
- IJF: 7935
- JudoInside.com: 75352
- Updated on 21 November 2022

Aléxia Taís Willrich Castilhos (born 13 February 1995 in Porto Alegre) is a Brazilian judoka.

She is the silver medallist of the 2019 Judo Grand Slam Brasilia in the -63 kg category.
