= Nami Nabekura =

Japanese judoka (born 1997)

Personal information
- Born: 11 April 1997 (age 29) Himeji, Hyogo, Japan
- Occupation: Judoka

Sport
- Country: Japan
- Sport: Judo
- Weight class: ‍–‍63 kg

Achievements and titles
- World Champ.: R32 (2021)
- Asian Champ.: (gold) (2017, 2018)
Medal record
Women's judo
Representing Japan
Asian Games
Gold medal – first place	2018 Jakarta	‍–‍63 kg
Asian Championships
Gold medal – first place	2017 Hong Kong	‍–‍63 kg
Silver medal – second place	2022 Nur‑Sultan	‍–‍63 kg
World Masters
Gold medal – first place	2019 Qingdao	‍–‍63 kg
Silver medal – second place	2017 Saint Petersburg	‍–‍63 kg
Silver medal – second place	2018 Guangzhou	‍–‍63 kg
Silver medal – second place	2021 Doha	‍–‍63 kg
IJF Grand Slam
Gold medal – first place	2022 Paris	‍–‍63 kg
Gold medal – first place	2022 Ulaanbaatar	‍–‍63 kg
Gold medal – first place	2023 Ulaanbaatar	‍–‍63 kg
Silver medal – second place	2017 Tokyo	‍–‍63 kg
Silver medal – second place	2018 Osaka	‍–‍63 kg
Silver medal – second place	2020 Paris	‍–‍63 kg
Silver medal – second place	2023 Paris	‍–‍63 kg
Bronze medal – third place	2019 Paris	‍–‍63 kg
Bronze medal – third place	2019 Osaka	‍–‍63 kg
Bronze medal – third place	2022 Tokyo	‍–‍63 kg
Bronze medal – third place	2024 Tashkent	‍–‍63 kg
IJF Grand Prix
Gold medal – first place	2016 Budapest	‍–‍63 kg
Gold medal – first place	2016 Qingdao	‍–‍63 kg
Gold medal – first place	2017 Zagreb	‍–‍63 kg
Gold medal – first place	2018 Zagreb	‍–‍63 kg
Silver medal – second place	2019 Zagreb	‍–‍63 kg
Bronze medal – third place	2017 Düsseldorf	‍–‍63 kg
World Juniors Championships
Gold medal – first place	2015 Abu Dhabi	‍–‍63 kg
Silver medal – second place	2014 Fort Lauderdale	‍–‍63 kg

Profile at external databases
- IJF: 17392
- JudoInside.com: 74041
- Updated on 3 March 2024

Nami Nabekura (鍋倉 那美, Nabekura Nami; born 11 April 1997) is a Japanese judoka. Nabekura's favorite technique is Uchimata.

== Judo career ==
Nabekura started practicing judo at the age of 5, following her two brothers. She often beat Hifumi Abe when they were in elementary school. Abe says that experience "made him what he is". In April 2010, Nabekura began studying at Taisei Junior High School. In August 2012, she won the National Junior High School Championships. In April 2013, she graduated from middle school and went on to Taisei High School. In March 2014, she won the National High School Championships. In August 2015, she won the Inter-High School Championships. In October 2015, Nabekura won the World Judo Championships Juniors both individual(–63 kg weight class) and team event. In 2016, Nabekura became a member of the Judo club at the Mitsui Sumitomo Insurance Group. In May 2017, she won the Asian Judo Championships. In December 2017, she finished second at the Grand Slam Tokyo and the World Masters. In August 2018, she won the Asian Games.

In 2021, she won the silver medal in her event at the 2021 Judo World Masters held in Doha, Qatar.

She won the gold medal in her event at the 2022 Judo Grand Slam Paris held in Paris, France.
