= Kiyomi Watanabe =

Filipino judoka (born 1996)

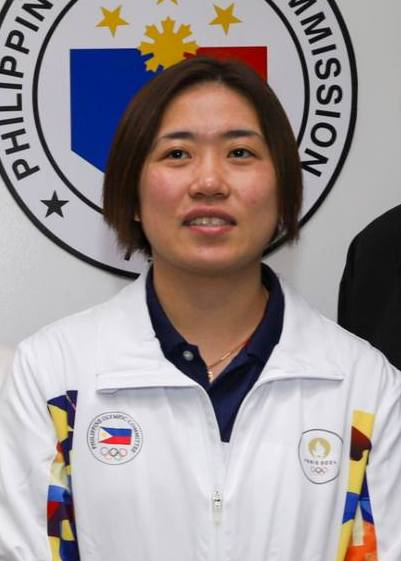
- Watanabe in 2024

Personal information
- Native name: 渡辺 聖未
- Full name: Kiyomi Sarausad Watanabe
- Born: August 25, 1996 (age 30) Cebu City, Philippines
- Occupation: Judoka
- Height: 170 cm (5 ft 7 in)

Sport
- Country: Philippines
- Sport: Judo
- Weight class: ‍–‍63 kg
- University team: Waseda University
- Club: ADVICS co
- Coached by: Yuta Yazaki
- Now coaching: Yes

Achievements and titles
- Olympic Games: R32 (2020, 2024)
- World Champ.: R16 (2017, 2019)
- Asian Champ.: (silver) (2018)
Medal record
Women's judo
Representing Philippines
Asian Games
Silver medal – second place	2018 Jakarta	‍–‍63 kg
Southeast Asian Games
Gold medal – first place	2013 Naypyidaw	‍–‍63 kg
Gold medal – first place	2015 Singapore	‍–‍63 kg
Gold medal – first place	2017 Kuala Lumpur	‍–‍63 kg
Gold medal – first place	2019 Philippines	‍–‍63 kg
Bronze medal – third place	2011 Jakarta-Palembang	‍–‍70 kg
IJF Grand Slam
Bronze medal – third place	2017 Paris	‍–‍63 kg
Bronze medal – third place	2018 Düsseldorf	‍–‍63 kg
Asian Junior Championships
Gold medal – first place	2014 Hong Kong	‍–‍63 kg
Asian Cadet Championships
Bronze medal – third place	2013 Hainan	‍–‍63 kg

Profile at external databases
- IJF: 10625
- JudoInside.com: 86453
- Updated on 30 July 2024

Kiyomi Watanabe (渡辺 聖未, Watanabe Kiyomi; born August 25, 1996) is a Filipino judoka who has represented the Philippines in international competitions including the 2020 Summer Olympics and the 2024 Summer Olympics.

== Early life and education ==
She was born on August 25, 1996, in Cebu City to a Filipino mother from Mandaue and a Japanese father from Yamanashi Prefecture. She spent some part of her childhood in Cebu City and studied at St. Paul Learning Center. She moved to Japan when she was eight years old.

Watanabe entered Waseda University to obtain a degree in sports science. She was a second year student by February 2016.

== Career ==
=== Philippines ===
She first competed for the Philippines at the 2011 Southeast Asian Games in Jakarta, Indonesia.

She won a gold medal for the Philippines at the 2013 Southeast Asian Games in the women's 63 kg event. She also won a bronze at the 2013 Asian Youth Judo Championship in Hainan, China.

As of December 2013, she ranks fourth in her weight division in Japan. Her mother, Irene Sarausad has assured that her daughter will continue in representing the Philippines.

Watanabe won the Philippines' first gold medal at the Asian Youth Judo Championship during the tournaments 2014 edition held in December 13–14 in Hong Kong.

In order to qualify in the 2016 Summer Olympics, Watanabe competed in the Paris Grand Slam in February 2016 and will compete at the Asian Judo Senior's Championship held in Uzbekistan on April of the same year. Watanabe ended as one of the top 16 judokas at the tournament held in Paris.

On February 12, 2017, at the Grand Slam Paris, Watanabe won a bronze medal after defeating Lucy Renshall of the United Kingdom in the under 63 kilogram event. The medal was the first for the Philippines in the IJF World Judo Tour. She later settled for silver after losing to Austrian Kathrin Unterwurzacher in the final of the same category at the 2017 European Women's Open Tournament in Austria. Watanabe breached the top 25 of the Judo world rankings which was released by the International Judo Federation in the same month. She was ranked 23.

The Philippines' first silver medal at the 2018 Asian Games was from Watanabe who lost to Nami Nabekura of Japan in the women's -63 kg final.

Watanabe qualified for the 2020 Summer Olympics in Tokyo, Japan via a continental quota. In preparation for the games, she has trained with her coach in the Yamanashi Prefecture and also sparred with male judokas at Waseda University. Competing in the Women's −63 kg, Watanabe failed to progress beyond the Round of 32 since she was eliminated via an ippon by Cristina Cabaña of Spain.

=== Tournaments in Japan ===
Watanabe won a silver at the 2014 All Japan High School Judo Championship. She later won gold medals at the All Japan College University Championship and All Japan Teams Championship in 2015.

Olympic Games
Preceded by Asa Miller	Flagbearer for Philippines (with Eumir Marcial); Tokyo 2020	Succeeded by Asa Miller
