= Daria Davydova =

Russian judoka (born 1991)

Personal information
- Native name: Дарья Григорьевна Давыдова
- Born: 21 March 1991 (age 35) Naberezhnye Chelny, Tatar ASSR, RSFSR, USSR (now Russia)
- Occupation: Judoka

Sport
- Country: Russia
- Sport: Judo
- Weight class: ‍–‍63 kg

Achievements and titles
- Olympic Games: R32 (2020)
- World Champ.: R16 (2017, 2018)
- European Champ.: (silver) (2021)
Medal record
Women's judo
Representing Russia
European Games
Gold medal – first place	2019 Minsk	Mixed team
European Championships
Gold medal – first place	2012 Chelyabinsk	Women's team
Silver medal – second place	2016 Kazan	Women's team
Silver medal – second place	2021 Lisbon	‍–‍63 kg
IJF Grand Slam
Gold medal – first place	2019 Ekaterinburg	‍–‍63 kg
Silver medal – second place	2016 Tyumen	‍–‍63 kg
Silver medal – second place	2019 Düsseldorf	‍–‍63 kg
Bronze medal – third place	2020 Budapest	‍–‍63 kg
Bronze medal – third place	2021 Tbilisi	‍–‍63 kg
IJF Grand Prix
Gold medal – first place	2016 Tashkent	‍–‍63 kg
European U23 Championships
Bronze medal – third place	2011 Tyumen	‍–‍70 kg
World Juniors Championships
Bronze medal – third place	2009 Paris	‍–‍70 kg
European Junior Championships
Silver medal – second place	2010 Samokov	‍–‍70 kg
Bronze medal – third place	2009 Yerevan	‍–‍70 kg
European Cadet Championships
Gold medal – first place	2007 Valletta	‍–‍63 kg
Military World Games
Bronze medal – third place	2019 Wuhan	‍–‍63 kg

Profile at external databases
- IJF: 1388
- JudoInside.com: 46394
- Updated on 10 November 2022

Daria Grigorievna Davydova (Russian: Дарья Григорьевна Давыдова; born 21 March 1991) is a Russian judoka. She won the silver medal in the women's 63 kg event at the 2021 European Judo Championships held in Lisbon, Portugal.

In 2019, Davydova won one of the bronze medals in the women's 63 kg event at the Military World Games held in Wuhan, China.

In 2021, Davydova competed in the women's 63 kg event at the 2020 Summer Olympics held in Tokyo, Japan where she was eliminated in her first match by Anriquelis Barrios of Venezuela.
