= 2015 World Judo Championships – Women's team =

Judo Women's team at the 2015 World Judo Championships
- Venue: Alau Ice Palace
- Location: Astana, Kazakhstan
- Date: 30 August
- Competitors: 75 from 15 nations
- Total prize money: 50,000$

Medalists
| gold medal | Japan (5th title) |
| silver medal | Poland |
| bronze medal | Germany |
| bronze medal | Russia |

Competition at external databases
- Links: JudoInside

The women's team competition of the 2015 World Judo Championships was held on 30 August.

Each team consisted of five judokas from the –48, 57, 63, 70 and +70 kg categories

== Results ==
First Round
Russia | 4
Australia | 1
Germany | 4
Mexico | 1
Poland | 5
Algeria | 0
Japan | 5
Brazil | 0
Cuba | 2
China | 3
Mongolia | 5
Kazakhstan | 0
South Korea | 4
Tunisia | 1

Quarterfinals
France | 2
Russia | 3
Germany | 2
Poland | 3
Japan | 5
China | 0
Mongolia | 3
South Korea | 2

Semifinals
Russia | 0
Poland | 5
Japan | 5
Mongolia | 0

Final
Poland | 0
Japan | 5

=== Repechage ===
| Repechage | | Third place |
| France | 2 |
| Germany | 3 | Germany | 3 |
| | | Mongolia | 2 |

| Repechage | | Third place |
| China | 1 |
| South Korea | 4 | South Korea | 2 |
| | | Russia | 3 |

== Prize money ==
The sums listed bring the total prizes awarded to 50,000$ for the individual event.

| Medal | Total | Judoka | Coach |
|---|---|---|---|
| Gold | 25,000$ | 20,000$ | 5,000$ |
| Silver | 15,000$ | 12,000$ | 3,000$ |
| Bronze | 5,000$ | 4,000$ | 1,000$ |
