= 2011 European Judo Championships – Women's team =

Judo competition

Judo Women's team at the 2011 European Judo Championships
- Venue: Abdi İpekçi Arena
- Location: Istanbul, Turkey
- Date: 24 April
- Nations: 8

Medalists
gold medal	France (18th title)
silver medal	Germany
bronze medal	Turkey
bronze medal	Ukraine

Competition at external databases
- Links: EJU • JudoInside

The women's team competition at the 2011 European Judo Championships was held on 24 April at the Abdi İpekçi Arena in Istanbul, Turkey.

== Results ==
Quarter-finals
Poland	1
Spain	4
Germany	3
Russia	2
Ukraine	1
Turkey	4
France	4
Great Britain	1

Semi-finals
Spain	1
Germany	4
Turkey	1
France	4

Final
Germany	2
France	3

=== Repechage ===
Repechage
Poland	1
Russia	4

Third place
Russia	2
Turkey	3

Repechage
Ukraine	3
Great Britain	2

Third place
Ukraine	3
Spain	2
