= Maria Centracchio =

Italian judoka (born 1994)

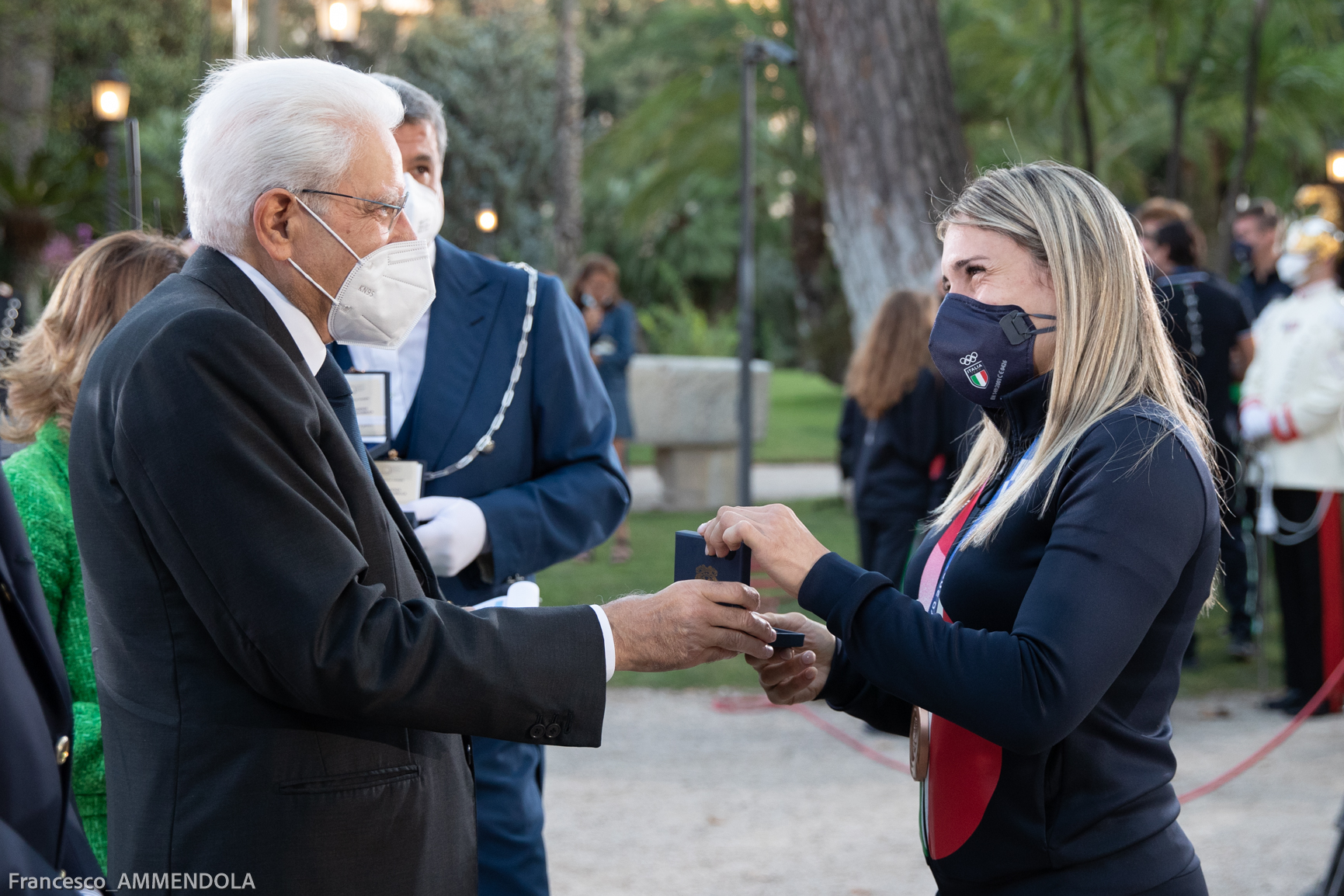
- Centracchio awarded by the Italian President Sergio Mattarella at Quirinale Palace in 2021.

Personal information
- Nationality: Italian
- Born: 28 September 1994 (age 31) Castel di Sangro, Italy
- Occupation: Judoka

Sport
- Country: Italy
- Sport: Judo
- Weight class: –63 kg
- Club: G.S. Fiamme Oro

Achievements and titles
- Olympic Games: (bronze) (2020)
- World Champ.: R16 (2019)
- European Champ.: (bronze) (2019)
Medal record
Women's judo
Representing Italy
Olympic Games
Bronze medal – third place	2020 Tokyo	‍–‍63 kg
European Games
Bronze medal – third place	2019 Minsk	‍–‍63 kg
IJF Grand Prix
Gold medal – first place	2019 Tel Aviv	‍–‍63 kg
Silver medal – second place	2018 Tashkent	‍–‍63 kg
European U23 Championships
Bronze medal – third place	2014 Wrocław	‍–‍57 kg
European Junior Championships
Silver medal – second place	2014 Bucharest	‍–‍57 kg

Profile at external databases
- IJF: 14730
- JudoInside.com: 55411
- Updated on 21 May 2023

Maria Centracchio (born 28 September 1994) is an Italian judoka, bronze medallist in the Women's 63 kg at the 2020 Summer Olympics in Tokyo and gold medallist of the 2019 Judo Grand Prix Tel Aviv in the 63 kg category.

== See also ==
- Italy at the 2020 Summer Olympics
