= Baldorjyn Möngönchimeg =

Mongolian judoka (born 1994)

Personal information
- Born: 11 June 1994 (age 32)
- Occupation: Judoka

Sport
- Country: Mongolia
- Sport: Judo
- Weight class: ‍–‍63 kg

Achievements and titles
- World Champ.: (bronze) (2017)
- Asian Champ.: (silver) (2017)
Medal record
Women's judo
Representing Mongolia
World Championships
Silver medal – second place	2014 Chelyabinsk	Women's team
Bronze medal – third place	2017 Budapest	‍–‍63 kg
Asian Championships
Silver medal – second place	2017 Hong Kong	‍–‍63 kg
IJF Grand Slam
Bronze medal – third place	2013 Moscow	‍–‍63 kg
IJF Grand Prix
Gold medal – first place	2016 Ulaanbaatar	‍–‍63 kg
Gold medal – first place	2018 Tashkent	‍–‍63 kg
Bronze medal – third place	2012 Abu Dhabi	‍–‍63 kg
Bronze medal – third place	2013 Ulaanbaatar	‍–‍63 kg
World Juniors Championships
Bronze medal – third place	2013 Ljubljana	‍–‍63 kg

Profile at external databases
- IJF: 9185
- JudoInside.com: 58486
- Updated on 27 June 2023

Baldorjyn Möngönchimeg (Mongolian: Балдоржын Мөнгөнчимэг; born 11 June 1994) is a Mongolian judoka.

Baldorjyn won a bronze medal at the 2017 World Judo Championships in Budapest.
