= Katharina Haecker (judoka) =

Australian judoka (born 1992)

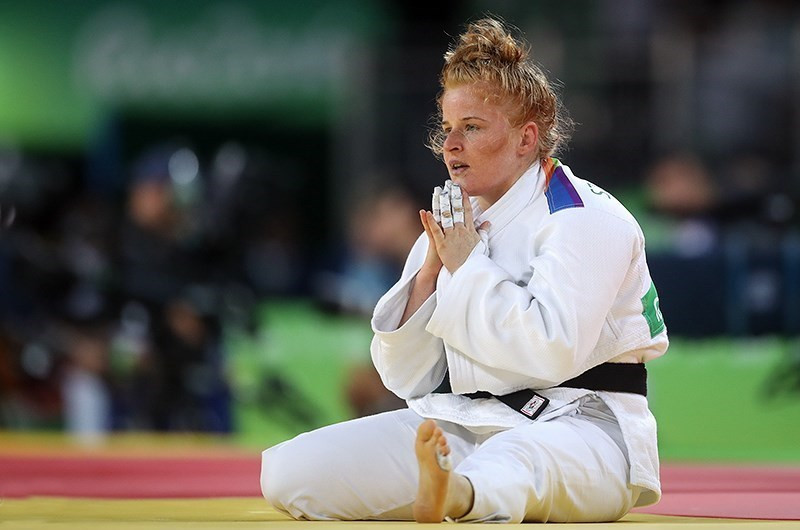

Personal information
- Born: 31 July 1992 (age 34) Hamburg, Germany
- Occupation: Judoka

Sport
- Country: Australia
- Sport: Judo
- Weight class: ‍–‍63 kg
- Retired: 1 August 2025

Achievements and titles
- Olympic Games: R16 (2016, 2020)
- World Champ.: 7th (2018, 2024)
- Regional finals: (gold) (2014, 2015, 2016, 2017, 2018); (silver) (2021); (gold) (2022, 2023, 2024)
- Commonwealth Games: (bronze) (2022)
Medal record
Women's judo
Representing Australia
Pan American-Oceania Championships
Gold medal – first place	2022 Lima	‍–‍63 kg
Gold medal – first place	2023 Calgary	‍–‍63 kg
Gold medal – first place	2024 Rio de Janeiro	‍–‍63 kg
Asian-Pacific Championships
Silver medal – second place	2021 Bishkek	‍–‍63 kg
Bronze medal – third place	2019 Fujairah	‍–‍63 kg
Oceania Championships
Gold medal – first place	2014 Auckland	‍–‍63 kg
Gold medal – first place	2015 Nouvelle	‍–‍63 kg
Gold medal – first place	2016 Canberra	‍–‍63 kg
Gold medal – first place	2017 Nukuʻalofa	‍–‍63 kg
Gold medal – first place	2018 Nouméa	‍–‍63 kg
IJF Grand Slam
Silver medal – second place	2023 Astana	‍–‍63 kg
Bronze medal – third place	2018 Abu Dhabi	‍–‍63 kg
Bronze medal – third place	2023 Tbilisi	‍–‍63 kg
Bronze medal – third place	2023 Antalya	‍–‍63 kg
Bronze medal – third place	2023 Baku	‍–‍63 kg
IJF Grand Prix
Gold medal – first place	2020 Tel Aviv	‍–‍63 kg
Gold medal – first place	2022 Perth	‍–‍63 kg
Silver medal – second place	2018 Agadir	‍–‍63 kg
Silver medal – second place	2019 Marrakesh	‍–‍63 kg
Silver medal – second place	2023 Perth	‍–‍63 kg
Silver medal – second place	2024 Odivelas	‍–‍63 kg
Bronze medal – third place	2016 Budapest	‍–‍63 kg
Bronze medal – third place	2017 Antalya	‍–‍63 kg
Bronze medal – third place	2018 Tunis	‍–‍63 kg
Bronze medal – third place	2024 Linz	‍–‍63 kg
Commonwealth Games
Bronze medal – third place	2022 Birmingham	‍–‍63 kg

Profile at external databases
- IJF: 15877
- JudoInside.com: 90056
- Updated on 21 May 2024

Katharina Haecker (born 31 July 1992) is an Australian retired judoka. She competed at the 2016 Summer Olympics in the women's 63 kg event, in which she was eliminated in the second round by Miku Tashiro.

Haecker competed in the women's 63 kg event at the 2020 Summer Olympics held in Tokyo, Japan. She won her first bout against Gili Sharir of Israel but then lost to Juul Franssen of Netherlands and did not advance to the quarterfinals.
