= 2012 European Judo Championships – Women's team =

Judo competition

Judo Women's team at the 2012 European Judo Championships
- Venue: Traktor Ice Arena
- Location: Chelyabinsk, Russia
- Date: 29 April
- Nations: 6

Medalists
| gold medal | Russia (3rd title) |
| silver medal | France |
| bronze medal | Germany |
| bronze medal | Turkey |

Competition at external databases
- Links: EJU • JudoInside

The women's team competition at the 2012 European Judo Championships was held on 29 April at the Traktor Ice Arena in Chelyabinsk, Russia.

== Results ==
Quarter-finals
Ukraine | 3
Great Britain | 2
Turkey | 0
Russia | 5

Semi-finals
Ukraine | 0
France | 5
Russia | 3
Germany | 2

Final
France | 2
Russia | 3

=== Repechage ===
| Third place |
| Great Britain | 1 |
| Germany | 4 |

| Third place |
| Turkey | 4 |
| Ukraine | 1 |
