= Magdalena Krssakova =

Austrian judoka (born 1994)

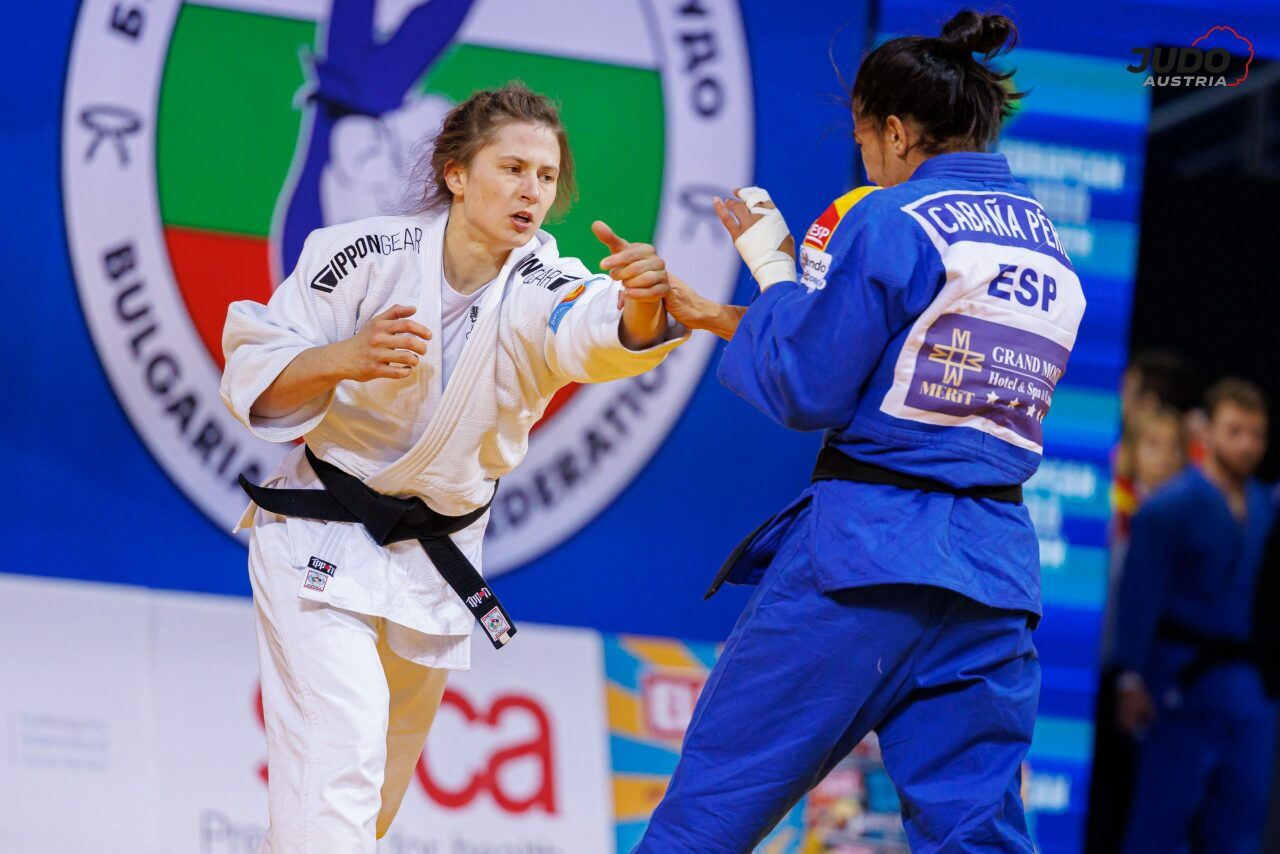
- Magdalena Krssakova (white) vs Cristina Cabaña (blue)

Personal information
- Nickname: Magda
- Born: 3 March 1994 (age 32)
- Occupation: Judoka
- Height: 169 cm (5 ft 7 in)

Sport
- Country: Austria
- Sport: Judo
- Weight class: –63 kg
- Rank: 2nd dan black belt
- Club: JC Sirvana

Achievements and titles
- Olympic Games: R16 (2020)
- World Champ.: R16 (2017)
- European Champ.: (silver) (2020)
Medal record
Women's judo
Representing Austria
European Games
Bronze medal – third place	2019 Minsk	Mixed team
European Championships
Silver medal – second place	2020 Prague	‍–‍63 kg
IJF Grand Slam
Bronze medal – third place	2021 Tel Aviv	‍–‍63 kg
Bronze medal – third place	2022 Antalya	‍–‍63 kg
IJF Grand Prix
Gold medal – first place	2017 Tbilisi	‍–‍63 kg
Gold medal – first place	2018 Antalya	‍–‍63 kg
Gold medal – first place	2018 Cancún	‍–‍63 kg
Silver medal – second place	2019 Perth	‍–‍63 kg
Bronze medal – third place	2016 Zagreb	‍–‍63 kg
Bronze medal – third place	2017 Hohhot	‍–‍63 kg
Bronze medal – third place	2018 Tunis	‍–‍63 kg
Bronze medal – third place	2023 Dushanbe	‍–‍63 kg
European Junior Championships
Bronze medal – third place	2013 Sarajevo	‍–‍63 kg
European Cadet Championships
Bronze medal – third place	2010 Teplice	‍–‍63 kg

Profile at external databases
- IJF: 4821
- JudoInside.com: 57496
- Updated on 4 June 2023

Magdalena Krssakova (born 3 March 1994) is an Austrian judoka. She won the silver medal in the women's 63 kg event at the 2020 European Judo Championships held in Prague, Czech Republic.

== Judo career ==
Krssakova attended the Ella Lingens Gymnasiums in Vienna.

In 2017, she competed in the women's 63 kg event at the European Judo Championships held in Warsaw, Poland. In that same year, she also competed in the women's 63 kg event at the 2017 World Judo Championships held in Budapest, Hungary.

In 2019, Krssakova represented Austria at the European Games held in Minsk, Belarus. She won one of the bronze medals in the mixed team event.

In January 2021, she competed in the women's 63 kg event at the Judo World Masters held in Doha, Qatar. In June 2021, she competed in the women's 63 kg event at the World Judo Championships held in Budapest, Hungary.

Krssakova competed in the 2020 Summer Olympics in Tokyo, in the women's 63 kg event, and was eliminated in the round of 16.

She won one of the bronze medals in her event at the 2022 Judo Grand Slam Antalya held in Antalya, Turkey.

== Achievements ==
Year	Tournament	Place	Weight class
2019	European Games	3rd	Mixed team
2020	European Championships	2nd	−63 kg

== Awards ==
- Sportswoman of the Year 2018 (German: Sportlerin des Jahres 2018)
