= Anriquelis Barrios =

Venezuelan judoka (born 1993)

Personal information
- Born: 20 August 1993 (age 32)
- Occupation: Judoka

Sport
- Country: Venezuela
- Sport: Judo
- Weight class: ‍–‍63 kg

Achievements and titles
- Olympic Games: 5th (2020)
- World Champ.: 5th (2021)
- Pan American Champ.: (silver) (2020)
Medal record
Women's judo
Representing Venezuela
Pan American Games
Silver medal – second place	2019 Lima	‍–‍63 kg
Pan American Championships
Silver medal – second place	2020 Guadalajara	‍–‍63 kg
Bronze medal – third place	2017 Panama City	‍–‍63 kg
Bronze medal – third place	2018 San José	‍–‍63 kg
Bronze medal – third place	2026 Panama City	‍–‍63 kg
IJF Grand Slam
Silver medal – second place	2020 Budapest	‍–‍63 kg
Silver medal – second place	2021 Antalya	‍–‍63 kg
Bronze medal – third place	2021 Tashkent	‍–‍63 kg
Bronze medal – third place	2021 Baku	‍–‍63 kg
Bronze medal – third place	2022 Budapest	‍–‍63 kg
IJF Grand Prix
Silver medal – second place	2019 Tashkent	‍–‍63 kg
Silver medal – second place	2022 Zagreb	‍–‍63 kg
Bronze medal – third place	2017 Cancún	‍–‍63 kg
Bronze medal – third place	2026 Lima	‍–‍63 kg
Central American and Caribbean Games
Gold medal – first place	2018 Barranquilla	‍–‍63 kg
Gold medal – first place	2026 Santo Domingo	‍–‍63 kg
Silver medal – second place	2018 Barranquilla	Women's team
Bronze medal – third place	2014 Veracruz	‍–‍57 kg
Bronze medal – third place	2014 Veracruz	Women's team
South American Games
Bronze medal – third place	2010 Medellín	Women's team
South American Junior Championships
Bronze medal – third place	2013 Buenos Aires	‍–‍57 kg

Profile at external databases
- IJF: 6754
- JudoInside.com: 69534
- Updated on 16 August 2026

Anriquelis Barrios (born 20 August 1993) is a Venezuelan judoka. She is a gold medalist in the women's 63 kg event at the Central American and Caribbean Games. She is also a silver medalist in her event at the 2019 Pan American Games and the 2020 Pan American Judo Championships.

== Career ==
At the 2019 Pan American Games held in Lima, Peru, Barrios won the silver medal in the women's 63 kg event. In that same year, she also competed in the women's 63 kg event at the 2019 World Judo Championships held in Tokyo, Japan.

In 2020, Barrios won the silver medal in her event at the Judo Grand Slam Hungary held in Budapest, Hungary. A month later, she won the silver medal in the women's 63 kg event at the 2020 Pan American Judo Championships held in Guadalajara, Mexico.

In January 2021, Barrios competed in the women's 63 kg event at the Judo World Masters held in Doha, Qatar. A few months later, she won the silver medal in her event at the 2021 Judo Grand Slam Antalya held in Antalya, Turkey. In June 2021, she lost her bronze medal match in the women's 63 kg event at the 2021 World Judo Championships held in Budapest, Hungary. In July 2021, she lost her bronze medal match in the women's 63 kg event at the 2020 Summer Olympics held in Tokyo, Japan.

== Achievements ==
Year	Tournament	Place	Weight class
2017	Pan American Judo Championships	3rd	−63 kg
2018	Pan American Judo Championships	3rd	−63 kg
2019	Pan American Games	2nd	−63 kg
2020	Pan American Judo Championships	2nd	−63 kg
