= Agata Ozdoba-Błach =

Polish judoka (born 1988)

Personal information
- Born: 25 February 1988 (age 38)
- Occupation: Judoka

Sport
- Country: Poland
- Sport: Judo
- Weight class: ‍–‍63 kg

Achievements and titles
- Olympic Games: 7th (2020)
- World Champ.: (bronze) (2017)
- European Champ.: (bronze) (2014)
Medal record
Women's judo
Representing Poland
World Championships
Bronze medal – third place	2017 Budapest	‍–‍63 kg
European Championships
Bronze medal – third place	2014 Montpellier	‍–‍63 kg
IJF Grand Slam
Gold medal – first place	2021 Kazan	‍–‍63 kg
Bronze medal – third place	2014 Abu Dhabi	‍–‍63 kg
Bronze medal – third place	2017 Abu Dhabi	‍–‍63 kg
IJF Grand Prix
Bronze medal – third place	2018 Budapest	‍–‍63 kg
Summer Universiade
Bronze medal – third place	2011 Shenzhen	Women's team

Profile at external databases
- IJF: 1981
- JudoInside.com: 30185
- Updated on 27 June 2023

Agata Ozdoba-Błach (born 25 February 1988) is a Polish judoka. She competed at the 2020 Summer Olympics, in Women's Judo 63 kg.

Ozdoba-Błach won a bronze medal at the 2017 World Judo Championships in Budapest.
