= Juul Franssen =

Dutch judoka (born 1990)

Personal information
- Nationality: Dutch
- Born: 18 January 1990 (age 36) Venlo, Netherlands
- Occupation: Judoka

Sport
- Country: Netherlands
- Sport: Judo
- Weight class: –63 kg

Achievements and titles
- Olympic Games: 5th (2020)
- World Champ.: (bronze) (2018, 2019)
- European Champ.: (bronze) (2020)
Medal record
Women's judo
Representing the Netherlands
World Championships
Bronze medal – third place	2018 Baku	‍–‍63 kg
Bronze medal – third place	2019 Tokyo	‍–‍63 kg
European Championships
Bronze medal – third place	2020 Prague	‍–‍63 kg
World Masters
Silver medal – second place	2016 Guadalajara	‍–‍63 kg
Bronze medal – third place	2017 Saint Petersburg	‍–‍63 kg
IJF Grand Slam
Gold medal – first place	2016 Abu Dhabi	‍–‍63 kg
Gold medal – first place	2018 Abu Dhabi	‍–‍63 kg
Silver medal – second place	2015 Paris	‍–‍63 kg
Silver medal – second place	2018 Ekaterinburg	‍–‍63 kg
Bronze medal – third place	2019 Baku	‍–‍63 kg
IJF Grand Prix
Gold medal – first place	2017 The Hague	‍–‍63 kg
Silver medal – second place	2011 Abu Dhabi	‍–‍57 kg
Bronze medal – third place	2015 Samsun	‍–‍63 kg
Bronze medal – third place	2016 Almaty	‍–‍63 kg
European U23 Championships
Gold medal – first place	2012 Prague	‍–‍57 kg
World Juniors Championships
Silver medal – second place	2009 Paris	‍–‍57 kg
European Junior Championships
Gold medal – first place	2008 Warsaw	‍–‍57 kg
Bronze medal – third place	2009 Yerevan	‍–‍57 kg
European Cadet Championships
Gold medal – first place	2006 Miskolc	‍–‍57 kg
Silver medal – second place	2005 Salzburg	‍–‍57 kg

Profile at external databases
- IJF: 1100
- JudoInside.com: 27137
- Updated on 23 May 2023

Juul Franssen (born 18 January 1990) is a Dutch judoka.

She participated at the 2018 World Judo Championships, winning a bronze medal.

In 2020, she won one of the bronze medals in the women's 63 kg event at the 2020 European Judo Championships held in Prague, Czech Republic.
