= 2015 World Judo Championships – Women's 57 kg =

Judo competition

Judo Women's 57 kg at the 2015 World Judo Championships
- Venue: Alau Ice Palace
- Location: Astana, Kazakhstan
- Date: 26 August
- Competitors: 55 from 44 nations
- Total prize money: 14,000$

Medalists
gold medal	Kaori Matsumoto (2nd title)	Japan
silver medal	Corina Căprioriu	Romania
bronze medal	Automne Pavia	France
bronze medal	Dorjsürengiin Sumiyaa	Mongolia

Competition at external databases
- Links: IJF • JudoInside

The women's 57 kg competition of the 2015 World Judo Championships was held on 26 August 2015.

== Results ==
=== Finals ===
Semi-finals
(Romania) Corina Căprioriu	010
(Canada) Catherine Beauchemin-Pinard	000
(France) Automne Pavia	000
(Japan) Kaori Matsumoto	000

Final
(Romania) Corina Căprioriu	000
(Japan) Kaori Matsumoto	010

=== Repechage ===
Repechage		Third place
(Hungary) Hedvig Karakas	000
(United States) Marti Malloy	010	(United States) Marti Malloy	000
		(France) Automne Pavia	000

Repechage		Third place
(Portugal) Telma Monteiro	000
(Mongolia) Dorjsürengiin Sumiyaa	100	(Mongolia) Dorjsürengiin Sumiyaa	000
		(Canada) Catherine Beauchemin-Pinard	000

=== Pool A ===
First Round
(Turkmenistan) Zuhra Madraimova	000
(Spain) Concepción Bellorín	000
(The Bahamas) Cynthia Rahming	000
(Luxembourg) Manon Durbach	101
(Philippines) Rena Furukawa	000
(Mongolia) Altaiin Batzul	100
(Mexico) Karla Tapia	000
(Serbia) Jovana Rogić	100
(Kyrgyzstan) Asel Musabekova	010
(Colombia) Yadinis Amarís	100
(Hungary) Hedvig Karakas	000
(Italy) Giulia Quintavalle	000

Second Round
(Romania) Corina Căprioriu	100
(Spain) Concepción Bellorín	000
(Luxembourg) Manon Durbach	011
(Mongolia) Altaiin Batzul	000
(Austria) Sabrina Filzmoser	000
(Serbia) Jovana Rogić	000
(Colombia) Yadinis Amarís	000
(Hungary) Hedvig Karakas	000

Third Round
(Romania) Corina Căprioriu	100
(Luxembourg) Manon Durbach	000
(Austria) Sabrina Filzmoser	000
(Hungary) Hedvig Karakas	000

Quarterfinals
(Romania) Corina Căprioriu	100
(Hungary) Hedvig Karakas	001

=== Pool B ===
First Round
(France) Hélène Receveaux	000
(Canada) Catherine Beauchemin-Pinard	110
(Cuba) Aliuska Ojeda	000
(Netherlands) Sanne Verhagen	100
(North Korea) Ri Hyo-sun	101
(Senegal) Hortense Diédhiou	000
(Venezuela) Anriquelis Barrios	000
(Tunisia) Nesria Jlassi	001
(Switzerland) Emilie Amaron	000
(South Korea) Kim Jan-di	100

Second Round
(Brazil) Rafaela Silva	000
(Canada) Catherine Beauchemin-Pinard	100
(Germany) Viola Wächter	000
(Netherlands) Sanne Verhagen	000
(United States) Marti Malloy	000
(North Korea) Ri Hyo-sun	000
(Tunisia) Nesria Jlassi	000
(South Korea) Kim Jan-di	112

Third Round
(Canada) Catherine Beauchemin-Pinard	102
(Germany) Viola Wächter	001
(United States) Marti Malloy	011
(South Korea) Kim Jan-di	000

Quarterfinals
(Canada) Catherine Beauchemin-Pinard	010
(United States) Marti Malloy	000

=== Pool C ===
First Round
(Algeria) Ratiba Tariket	000
(Turkmenistan) Rushana Nurjavova	100
(Hong Kong) Leung Po Sum	000
(Romania) Loredana Ohâi	100
(Poland) Arleta Podolak	001
(Puerto Rico) Jeanette Rodriguez	000
(United States) Hana Carmichael	001
(Israel) Camila Minakawa	000
(Bulgaria) Ivelina Ilieva	000
(United Kingdom) Nekoda Smythe-Davis	100
(Ukraine) Shushana Hevondian	001
(Switzerland) Fabienne Kocher	000

Second Round
(Portugal) Telma Monteiro	011
(Turkmenistan) Rushana Nurjavova	000
(Romania) Loredana Ohâi	002
(Poland) Arleta Podolak	001
(France) Automne Pavia	101
(United States) Hana Carmichael	000
(United Kingdom) Nekoda Smythe-Davis	100
(Ukraine) Shushana Hevondian	000

Third Round
(Portugal) Telma Monteiro	001
(Romania) Loredana Ohâi	000
(France) Automne Pavia	100
(United Kingdom) Nekoda Smythe-Davis	000

Quarterfinals
(Portugal) Telma Monteiro	000
(France) Automne Pavia	001

=== Pool D ===
First Round
(Madagascar) Brenda Andriatiana	000
(China) Liu Yang	100
(Senegal) Léa Buet	000
(Austria) Tina Zeltner	000
(New Zealand) Darcina Manuel	000
(Kosovo) Nora Gjakova	100
(Russia) Irina Zabludina	000
(Spain) Jaione Equísoain	000
(Japan) Kaori Matsumoto	100
(North Korea) Choe Hyon-a	000
(Slovenia) Vlora Bedeti	000
(Chinese Taipei) Lien Chen-ling	100

Second Round
(Mongolia) Dorjsürengiin Sumiyaa	000
(China) Liu Yang	000
(Austria) Tina Zeltner	000
(Kosovo) Nora Gjakova	000
(Germany) Miryam Roper	000
(Russia) Irina Zabludina	001
(Japan) Kaori Matsumoto	100
(Chinese Taipei) Lien Chen-ling	000

Third Round
(Mongolia) Dorjsürengiin Sumiyaa	001
(Kosovo) Nora Gjakova	000
(Russia) Irina Zabludina	000
(Japan) Kaori Matsumoto	100

Quarterfinals
(Mongolia) Dorjsürengiin Sumiyaa	000
(Japan) Kaori Matsumoto	001

== Prize money ==
The sums listed bring the total prizes awarded to $14,000 for the individual event.

Medal	Total	Judoka	Coach
Gold	$6,000	$4,800	$1,200
Silver	$4,000	$3,200	$800
Bronze	$2,000	$1,600	$400
