= 2011 World Judo Championships – Women's 57 kg =

Judo competition

Judo Women's 57 kg at the 2011 World Judo Championships
- Venue: Accor Arena
- Location: Paris, France
- Date: 24 August 2011
- Competitors: 65 from 51 nations

Medalists
gold medal	Aiko Sato (1st title)	Japan
silver medal	Rafaela Silva	Brazil
bronze medal	Corina Căprioriu	Romania
bronze medal	Kaori Matsumoto	Japan

Competition at external databases
- Links: IJF • JudoInside

The women's 57 kg competition of the 2011 World Judo Championships was held on August 24.

== Medalists ==
Gold	Silver	Bronze
Aiko Sato (JPN)	Rafaela Silva (BRA)	Corina Căprioriu (ROU); Kaori Matsumoto (JPN)

== Results ==
=== Pool A ===
First round fights

	Score	
Alina Ten (Kazakhstan)	000–100	(South Korea) Park Hyo-Ju

Second Round
(Japan) Kaori Matsumoto	011
(Brazil) Ketleyn Quadros	000
(Turkmenistan) Violetta Shumilova	000
(Senegal) Hortance Diedhiou	100
(Ukraine) Anna Nikitina	000
(China) Wang Hui	101
(Germany) Marlen Hein	010
(United States) Hana Carmichael	000
(France) Morgane Ribout	000
(United Kingdom) Gemma Howell	101
(Turkey) Tuğba Zehir	000
(Hungary) Hedvig Karakas	100
(Estonia) Julia Bezko	000
(Spain) Isabel Fernández	001
(Malta) Joanna Camilleri	000
(South Korea) Park Hyo-Ju	101

Quarterfinals
(Japan) Kaori Matsumoto	100
(Senegal) Hortance Diedhiou	000
(China) Wang Hui	000
(Germany) Marlen Hein	010
(United Kingdom) Gemma Howell	100
(Hungary) Hedvig Karakas	000
(Spain) Isabel Fernández	100
(South Korea) Park Hyo-Ju	000

Semifinals
(Japan) Kaori Matsumoto	100
(Germany) Marlen Hein	000
(United Kingdom) Gemma Howell	001
(Spain) Isabel Fernández	010

Final
(Japan) Kaori Matsumoto	100
(Spain) Isabel Fernández	000

=== Pool B ===
First Round
(Japan) Aiko Sato	100
(Vietnam) Nhu Van Ho Thi	000
(Haiti) Ange Mercie Jean Baptiste	001
(Azerbaijan) Kifayat Gasimova	120
(Cuba) Yurisleidy Lupetey Cobas	002
(Mexico) Ana León	000
(Colombia) Yadinis Amarís	110
(Serbia) Jovana Rogić	001
(Romania) Corina Căprioriu	101
(Chinese Taipei) Lien Chen-ling	000
(Ghana) Szandra Szogedi	100
(Guam) Kaiulani Cruz	000
(Bulgaria) Ivelina Ilieva	000
(Canada) Joliane Melançon	100
(Mongolia) Battugs Tumen-Od	000
(Russia) Ekaterina Melnikova	002

Quarterfinals
(Japan) Aiko Sato	100
(Azerbaijan) Kifayat Gasimova	011
(Cuba) Yurisleidy Lupetey Cobas	003
(Colombia) Yadinis Amarís	000
(Romania) Corina Căprioriu	100
(Ghana) Szandra Szogedi	000
(Canada) Joliane Melançon	100
(Russia) Ekaterina Melnikova	001

Semifinals
(Japan) Aiko Sato	002
(Cuba) Yurisleidy Lupetey Cobas	000
(Romania) Corina Căprioriu	100
(Canada) Joliane Melançon	001

Final
(Japan) Aiko Sato	102
(Romania) Corina Căprioriu	000

=== Pool C ===
First Round
(Portugal) Telma Monteiro	001
(Germany) Miryam Roper	100
(Nigeria) Justina Agatahi	000
(Ecuador) Diana Villavicencio	101
(Macau) Cheang Ka Mei	000
(South Korea) Kim Jan-Di	100
(Turkmenistan) Zuhra Madraimova	000
(Kazakhstan) Lenariya Mingazova	101
(Brazil) Rafaela Silva	010
(Italy) Giulia Quintavalle	000
(Spain) Concepción Bellorín	101
(Australia) Carli Renzi	000
(Morocco) Fatima Zahra Ait Ali	101
(India) Angom Anita Chanu	000
(Greece) Ioulietta Boukouvala	100
(Armenia) Zhanna Stankevich	000

Quarterfinals
(Germany) Miryam Roper	100
(Ecuador) Diana Villavicencio	000
(South Korea) Kim Jan-Di	010
(Kazakhstan) Lenariya Mingazova	100
(Brazil) Rafaela Silva	100
(Spain) Concepción Bellorín	000
(Morocco) Fatima Zahra Ait Ali	000
(Greece) Ioulietta Boukouvala	100

Semifinals
(Germany) Miryam Roper	100
(Kazakhstan) Lenariya Mingazova	000
(Brazil) Rafaela Silva	100
(Greece) Ioulietta Boukouvala	001

Final
(Germany) Miryam Roper	000
(Brazil) Rafaela Silva	100

=== Pool D ===
First Round
(Austria) Sabrina Filzmoser	100
(Ethiopia) Konjit Gulecha Aydiko	000
(Bulgaria) Elena Grigorova	110
(Nepal) Phupu Khatri	000
(Uzbekistan) Shoira Masharipova	000
(China) Zhu Guirong	101
(Kyrgyzstan) Elena Isakova	000
(United States) Marti Malloy	110
(France) Automne Pavia	101
(Venezuela) Flor Velasquez	000
(Colombia) Maria Arango	010
(Algeria) Ratiba Tariket	001
(North Korea) Rim Yun-Hui	101
(Mongolia) Sumiya Dorjsuren	000
(Kosovo) Nora Gjakova	000
(Russia) Irina Zabludina	100

Quarterfinals
(Austria) Sabrina Filzmoser	100
(Bulgaria) Elena Grigorova	000
(China) Zhu Guirong	000
(United States) Marti Malloy	010
(France) Automne Pavia	111
(Colombia) Maria Arango	000
(North Korea) Rim Yun-Hui	000
(Russia) Irina Zabludina	100

Semifinals
(Austria) Sabrina Filzmoser	000
(United States) Marti Malloy	001
(France) Automne Pavia	000
(Russia) Irina Zabludina	100

Final
(United States) Marti Malloy	010
(Russia) Irina Zabludina	000

=== Repechage ===
Repechage		Third place
(Spain) Isabel Fernández	000
(Romania) Corina Căprioriu	100	(Romania) Corina Căprioriu	100
		(United States) Marti Malloy	000

Repechage		Third place
(Germany) Miryam Roper	100
(Russia) Irina Zabludina	001	(Germany) Miryam Roper	000
		(Japan) Kaori Matsumoto	100

=== Finals ===
Semi-finals
(Japan) Kaori Matsumoto	001
(Japan) Aiko Sato	100
(Brazil) Rafaela Silva	100
(United States) Marti Malloy	000

Final
(Japan) Aiko Sato	100
(Brazil) Rafaela Silva	000
