= 2014 World Judo Championships – Women's 57 kg =

Judo competition

Judo Women's 57 kg at the 2014 World Judo Championships
- Venue: Traktor Ice Arena
- Location: Chelyabinsk, Russia
- Date: 27 August 2014
- Competitors: 42 from 35 nations
- Total prize money: 14,000$

Medalists
gold medal	Nae Udaka (1st title)	Japan
silver medal	Telma Monteiro	Portugal
bronze medal	Sanne Verhagen	Netherlands
bronze medal	Automne Pavia	France

Competition at external databases
- Links: IJF • JudoInside

The women's 57 kg competition of the 2014 World Judo Championships was held on 27 August.

== Medalists ==
Gold	Silver	Bronze
Nae Udaka (JPN)	Telma Monteiro (POR)	Sanne Verhagen (NED); Automne Pavia (FRA)

== Results ==
=== Finals ===
Semi-finals
(Japan) Nae Udaka	001
(France) Automne Pavia	000
(Mongolia) Dorjsürengiin Sumiyaa	000
(Portugal) Telma Monteiro	100

Final
(Japan) Nae Udaka	100
(Portugal) Telma Monteiro	000

=== Repechage ===
Repechage		Third place
(Netherlands) Sanne Verhagen	010
(Austria) Sabrina Filzmoser	000	(Netherlands) Sanne Verhagen	001
		(Mongolia) Dorjsürengiin Sumiyaa	000

Repechage		Third place
(Brazil) Rafaela Silva	010
(Switzerland) Fabienne Kocher	000	(Brazil) Rafaela Silva	001
		(France) Automne Pavia	001

=== Pool A ===
First Round
(Ivory Coast) Zouleiha Dabonne	000
(Cuba) Aliuska Ojeda	101
(Senegal) Hortense Diédhiou	000
(Bulgaria) Ivelina Ilieva	100

Quarterfinals
(Germany) Miryam Roper	000
(Cuba) Aliuska Ojeda	100
(Colombia) Yadinis Amarís	000
(Japan) Nae Udaka	000
(Canada) Catherine Beauchemin-Pinard	000
(Bulgaria) Ivelina Ilieva	010
(Ukraine) Shushana Hevondian	000
(Netherlands) Sanne Verhagen	100

Semifinals
(Cuba) Aliuska Ojeda	000
(Japan) Nae Udaka	000
(Bulgaria) Ivelina Ilieva	000
(Netherlands) Sanne Verhagen	100

Final
(Japan) Nae Udaka	100
(Netherlands) Sanne Verhagen	000

=== Pool B ===
First Round
(Venezuela) Anriquelis Barrios	000
(China) Liu Yang	110
(Russia) Irina Zabludina	000
(Poland) Arleta Podolak	000
(Azerbaijan) Kifayat Gasimova	100
(United States) Hana Carmichael	000

Quarterfinals
(France) Automne Pavia	010
(China) Liu Yang	000
(Switzerland) Emilie Amaron	000
(Poland) Arleta Podolak	011
(Austria) Sabrina Filzmoser	010
(Azerbaijan) Kifayat Gasimova	002
(Romania) Loredana Ohâi	000
Nora Gjakova	000

Semifinals
(France) Automne Pavia	101
(Poland) Arleta Podolak	010
(Austria) Sabrina Filzmoser	001
(Romania) Loredana Ohâi	000

Final
(France) Automne Pavia	110
(Austria) Sabrina Filzmoser	000

=== Pool C ===
First Round
(Slovenia) Vlora Bedeti	100
(Canada) Stéfanie Tremblay	000
(South Korea) Cha Yumi	000
(Israel) Camila Minakawa	000

Quarterfinals
(Brazil) Rafaela Silva	101
(Slovenia) Vlora Bedeti	000
(Serbia) Jovana Rogić	000
(Austria) Tina Zeltner	000
(Mongolia) Dorjsürengiin Sumiyaa	101
(Israel) Camila Minakawa	000
(Turkmenistan) Rushana Nurjovova	000
(Hungary) Hedvig Karakas	100

Semifinals
(Brazil) Rafaela Silva	001
(Austria) Tina Zeltner	000
(Mongolia) Dorjsürengiin Sumiyaa	010
(Hungary) Hedvig Karakas	000

Final
(Brazil) Rafaela Silva	010
(Mongolia) Dorjsürengiin Sumiyaa	010

=== Pool D ===
First Round
(Japan) Kaori Matsumoto	000
(North Korea) Ri Hyo-sun	000
(Kazakhstan) Sevara Nishanbayeva	100
(Algeria) Ratiba Tariget	000
(Romania) Corina Căprioriu	000
(Chinese Taipei) Lien Chen-ling	100

Quarterfinals
(United States) Marti Malloy	100
(Japan) Kaori Matsumoto	000
(Kazakhstan) Sevara Nishanbayeva	000
(Portugal) Telma Monteiro	100
(Brazil) Ketleyn Quadros	000
(Chinese Taipei) Lien Chen-ling	000
(Switzerland) Fabienne Kocher	102
(Kyrgyzstan) Elmira Akishova	000

Semifinals
(United States) Marti Malloy	000
(Portugal) Telma Monteiro	001
(Chinese Taipei) Lien Chen-ling	000
(Switzerland) Fabienne Kocher	000

Final
(Portugal) Telma Monteiro	110
(Switzerland) Fabienne Kocher	000

== Prize money ==
The sums listed bring the total prizes awarded to $14,000 for the individual event.

Medal	Total	Judoka	Coach
Gold	$6,000	$4,800	$1,200
Silver	$4,000	$3,200	$800
Bronze	$2,000	$1,600	$400
