= Judo at the 2016 Summer Olympics – Women's 57 kg =

Women's 57 kg at the Games of the XXXI Olympiad
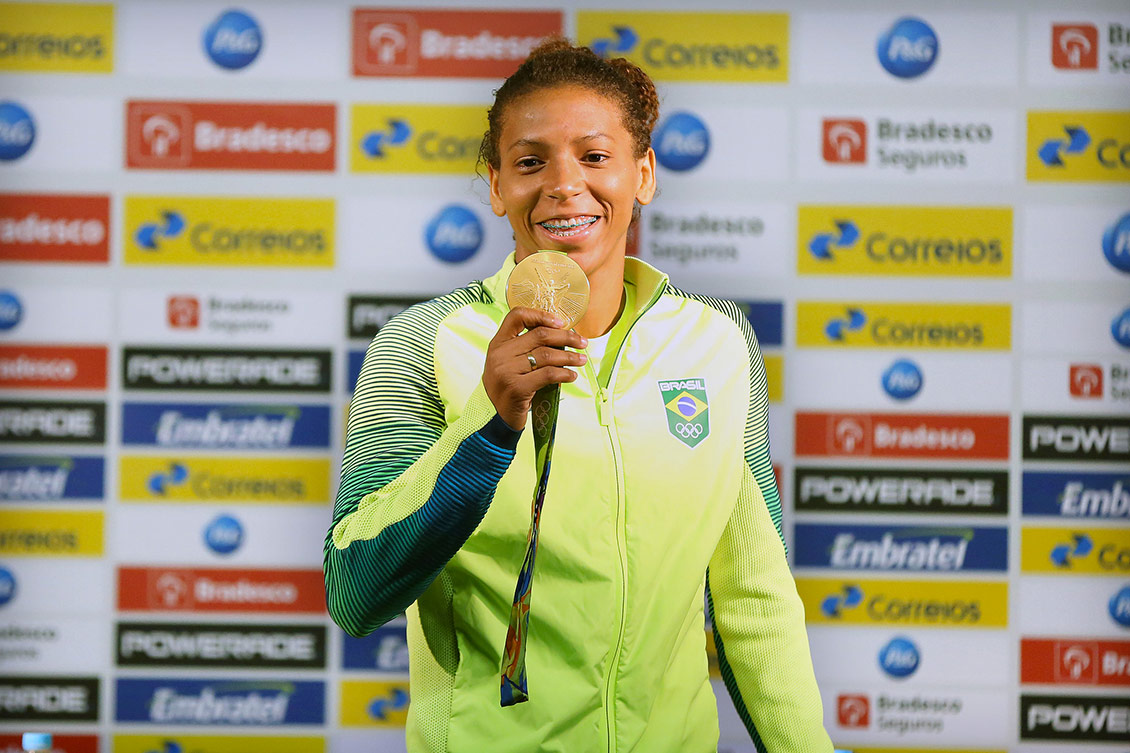
- Gold medalist Rafaela Silva
- Venue: Carioca Arena 2
- Date: 8 August 2016
- Competitors: 23 from 23 nations

Medalists
1st place, gold medalist(s)		Rafaela Silva	Brazil
2nd place, silver medalist(s)		Sumiya Dorjsuren	Mongolia
3rd place, bronze medalist(s)		Telma Monteiro	Portugal
3rd place, bronze medalist(s)		Kaori Matsumoto	Japan

The women's 57 kg competition in judo at the 2016 Summer Olympics in Rio de Janeiro was held on 8 August at the Carioca Arena 2.

The gold and silver medals were determined by a single-elimination tournament, with the winner of the final taking gold and the loser receiving silver. Judo events awarded two bronze medals. Quarterfinal losers competed in a repechage match for the right to face a semifinal loser for a bronze medal (that is, the judokas defeated in quarterfinals A and B competed against each other, with the winner of that match facing the semifinal loser from the other half of the bracket).

The medals for the competition were presented by Yumilka Ruiz, Cuba, member of the International Olympic Committee and the gifts were presented by Sergey Soloveychik, vice president of the International Judo Federation.

== Results ==
=== Finals ===
Semi-finals
Dorjsürengiin Sumiyaa (MGL)	100
Kaori Matsumoto (JPN)	000
Rafaela Silva (BRA)	010
Corina Căprioriu (ROU)	000

Final
Dorjsürengiin Sumiyaa (MGL)	000
Rafaela Silva (BRA)	010

=== Repechages ===
Repechage		Bronze medal
Telma Monteiro (POR)	100
Automne Pavia (FRA)	000	Telma Monteiro (POR)	001
		Corina Căprioriu (ROU)	000

Repechage		Bronze medal
Hedvig Karakas (HUN)	000
Lien Chen-ling (TPE)	001	Lien Chen-ling (TPE)	000
		Kaori Matsumoto (JPN)	001

=== Pool A ===
First round
Sanne Verhagen (NED)	100
Hortense Diédhiou (SEN)	000
Darcina Manuel (NZL)	001
Irina Zabludina (RUS)	000

Second round
Dorjsürengiin Sumiyaa (MGL)	000
Sanne Verhagen (NED)	000
Telma Monteiro (POR)	002
Darcina Manuel (NZL)	000

Quarterfinals
Dorjsürengiin Sumiyaa (MGL)	000
Telma Monteiro (POR)	000

=== Pool B ===
First round
Nekoda Smythe-Davis (GBR)	011
Sabrina Filzmoser (AUT)	000

Second round
Kaori Matsumoto (JPN)	101
Zouleiha Abzetta Dabonne (CIV)	000
Automne Pavia (FRA)	001
Nekoda Smythe-Davis (GBR)	000

Quarterfinals
Kaori Matsumoto (JPN)	010
Automne Pavia (FRA)	000

=== Pool C ===
First round
Miryam Roper (GER)	000
Rafaela Silva (BRA)	100
Hedvig Karakas (HUN)	101
Rushana Nurjavova (TKM)	000

Second round
Kim Jan-di (KOR)	000
Rafaela Silva (BRA)	010
Catherine Beauchemin-Pinard (CAN)	000
Hedvig Karakas (HUN)	000

Quarterfinals
Rafaela Silva (BRA)	010
Hedvig Karakas (HUN)	000

=== Pool D ===
First round
Arleta Podolak (POL)	000
Lien Chen-ling (TPE)	100
Yadinis Amarís (COL)	000
Nora Gjakova (KOS)	100

Second round
Marti Malloy (USA)	000
Lien Chen-ling (TPE)	000
Corina Căprioriu (ROU)	002
Nora Gjakova (KOS)	000

Quarterfinals
Lien Chen-ling (TPE)	000
Corina Căprioriu (ROU)	100
