= Judo at the 2015 European Games – Women's 57 kg =

Judo competition

Judo Women's 57 kg at the 2015 European Games
- Venue: Heydar Aliyev Arena
- Location: Baku, Azerbaijan
- Date: 25 June
- Competitors: 26 from 20 nations

Medalists
gold medal	Telma Monteiro (3rd title)	Portugal
silver medal	Hedvig Karakas	Hungary
bronze medal	Nora Gjakova	Kosovo
bronze medal	Miryam Roper	Germany

Competition at external databases
- Links: IJF • JudoInside

The women's 57 kg judo event at the 2015 European Games in Baku was held on 25 June at the Heydar Aliyev Arena.

== Results ==
=== Final ===
Final
Telma Monteiro (POR)	110
Hedvig Karakas (HUN)	000

=== Repechage ===
Repechage
Sanne Verhagen (NED)	100
Sabrina Filzmoser (AUT)	000

Third place
Sanne Verhagen (NED)	000
Nora Gjakova (KOS)	010

Repechage
Corina Căprioriu (ROU)	000
Miryam Roper (GER)	000

Third place
Miryam Roper (GER)	100
Automne Pavia (FRA)	000

=== Top half ===
Round of 32
Kifayat Gasimova (AZE)	000
Jovana Rogić (SRB)	000
Sanne Verhagen (NED)	110
Concepción Bellorín (ESP)	000
Larissa Csatari (SUI)	000
Loredana Ohâi (ROU)	001
Irina Zabludina (RUS)	011
Nekoda Smythe-Davis (GBR)	000
Arleta Podolak (POL)	000
Viola Wächter (GER)	100

Round of 16
Telma Monteiro (POR)	000
Jovana Rogić (SRB)	000
Sanne Verhagen (NED)	000
Loredana Ohâi (ROU)	000
Automne Pavia (FRA)	100
Irina Zabludina (RUS)	000
Sabrina Filzmoser (AUT)	100
Viola Wächter (GER)	001

Quarterfinals
Telma Monteiro (POR)	000
Sanne Verhagen (NED)	000
Automne Pavia (FRA)	110
Sabrina Filzmoser (AUT)	000

Semifinals
Telma Monteiro (POR)	011
Automne Pavia (FRA)	000

=== Bottom half ===
Round of 32
Giulia Quintavalle (ITA)	000
Vlora Beđeti (SLO)	000
Laetitia Blot (FRA)	000
Nora Gjakova (KOS)	110
Camila Minakawa (ISR)	100
Tanja Božović (MNE)	000
Ivelina Ilieva (BUL)	100
Jaione Equisoain (ESP)	000
Emilie Amaron (SUI)	000
Tina Zeltner (AUT)	110

Round of 16
Corina Căprioriu (ROU)	000
Giulia Quintavalle (ITA)	000
Nora Gjakova (KOS)	001
Camila Minakawa (ISR)	000
Miryam Roper (GER)	100
Ivelina Ilieva (BUL)	000
Hedvig Karakas (HUN)	100
Tina Zeltner (AUT)	000

Quarterfinals
Corina Căprioriu (ROU)	000
Nora Gjakova (KOS)	000
Miryam Roper (GER)	000
Hedvig Karakas (HUN)	100

Semifinals
Nora Gjakova (KOS)	000
Hedvig Karakas (HUN)	000
