= Portugal at the 2016 Summer Olympics =

- IOC code: POR
- NOC: Olympic Committee of Portugal
- Website: www.comiteolimpicoportugal.pt (in Portuguese)

in Rio de Janeiro
- Competitors: 92 in 16 sports
- Flag bearers: João Rodrigues (opening); Telma Monteiro (closing)
- Medals Ranked 78th: Gold 0 Silver 0 Bronze 1 Total 1

Summer Olympics appearances (overview)
- 1912; 1920; 1924; 1928; 1932; 1936; 1948; 1952; 1956; 1960; 1964; 1968; 1972; 1976; 1980; 1984; 1988; 1992; 1996; 2000; 2004; 2008; 2012; 2016; 2020; 2024; 2028

Portugal competed at the 2016 Summer Olympics in Rio de Janeiro, Brazil, from 5 to 21 August 2016. Portuguese athletes had appeared in every edition of the Summer Olympic Games since the nation's debut in 1912.

The Olympic Committee of Portugal fielded a team of 92 athletes, 62 men and 30 women, across 16 sports at the Games. It was the nation's second-largest ever delegation sent to the Olympics, falling short of the record for the most athletes (107) achieved in Atlanta 1996 by nearly 20 percent. Men's football was the only team-based sport in which Portugal had representatives at these Games, returning to the Olympic scene after being absent from the previous two editions. Portugal also marked its Olympic debut in golf (new to the 2016 Games), as well as its return to taekwondo after 8 years, and slalom canoeing and tennis after 16 years.

The Portuguese roster featured 31 returning Olympians, including three past medalists: triple jumper and Beijing 2008 champion Nelson Évora and sprint canoeing duo Fernando Pimenta and Emanuel Silva, who brought home the nation's only medal, a silver, at London 2012. Windsurfer and multiple-time European champion João Rodrigues, who was selected as the nation's flag bearer in the opening ceremony, set a historic milestone as the first Portuguese athlete to participate in his seventh and final Olympics. Pistol shooter João Costa, the oldest of the team (aged 52), and Laser sailor Gustavo Lima joined the list of the nation's athletes who attended their fifth Games. Other notable competitors on the Portuguese roster included world-ranked judoka and four-time Olympian Telma Monteiro, road cycling pro Rui Costa, European Games taekwondo champion Rui Bragança, and sprinter Lorène Bazolo, who ran for her native Congo in London four years earlier.

Portugal left Rio de Janeiro with only a bronze medal won by Monteiro in the women's 57 kg, saving its pride from the humiliation of returning empty-handed for the first time since Barcelona 1992. Several Portuguese athletes advanced further to the finals of their respective sporting events, but came closest to the nation's medal haul, including Évora (sixth, men's triple jump), Pimenta (fifth, men's K-1 1000 m), Silva and his new partner João Ribeiro (fourth, men's K-2 1000 m), and João José Pereira, who finished fifth in the men's triathlon.

== Medalists ==
Medal	Name	Sport	Event	Date
Bronze	Telma Monteiro	Judo	Women's 57 kg	8 August

== Competitors ==
The following is the list of number of competitors participating in the Games. Note that reserves in fencing, field hockey, football, and handball are not counted as athletes:

Sport	Men	Women	Total
Athletics	8	16	24
Badminton	1	1	2
Canoeing	6	2	8
Cycling	6	0	6
Equestrian	0	1	1
Football	18	0	18
Golf	2	0	2
Gymnastics	1	2	3
Judo	4	2	6
Sailing	4	1	5
Shooting	1	0	1
Swimming	2	3	5
Table tennis	3	2	5
Taekwondo	1	0	1
Tennis	2	0	2
Triathlon	3	0	3
Total	62	30	92

== Athletics ==
Portuguese athletes achieved qualifying standards in several events (maximum of three athletes per event). On 31 May 2016, the Portuguese Athletics Federation (FPA) named the first batch of track and road athletes, all competing in both marathon and race walking, to the Olympic roster, with João Vieira remarkably going to his fourth Games. The final roster of 25 athletes (9 men and 16 women) was officially announced on 12 July 2016. Eight days later, the Portuguese federation announced that Yazaldes Nascimento would be unable to participate in the men's 100 metres due to injury, which had already left him out of the delegation for the 2016 European Athletics Championships.

Key

- Note–Ranks given for track events are within the athlete's heat only
- Q = Qualified for the next round
- q = Qualified for the next round as a fastest loser or, in field events, by position without achieving the qualifying target
- NR = National record
- N/A = Round not applicable for the event
- Bye = Athlete not required to compete in round

Track & road events
Men

Athlete	Event	Final	
Athlete	Event	Result	Rank
João Vieira	20 km walk	1:23:03	31
João Vieira	50 km walk	DNF	
Sérgio Vieira	20 km walk	1:27:39	53
Miguel Carvalho	50 km walk	4:08:16	36
Pedro Isidro	50 km walk	4:03:42	32
Ricardo Ribas	Marathon	2:38:29	134
Rui Pedro Silva	Marathon	2:30:52	123

Women

Athlete	Event	Heat		Quarterfinal		Semifinal		Final	
Athlete	Event	Result	Rank	Result	Rank	Result	Rank	Result	Rank
Lorène Bazolo	100 m	Bye		11.43	4	Did not advance			
Lorène Bazolo	200 m	23.01	4	—N/a		Did not advance			
Cátia Azevedo	400 m	52.38	4	—N/a		Did not advance			
Marta Pen	1500 m	4:18.53	12	—N/a		Did not advance			
Carla Salomé Rocha	10000 m	—N/a						32:06.05	26
Vera Barbosa	400 m hurdles	57.28	6	—N/a		Did not advance			
Jéssica Augusto	Marathon	—N/a						DNF	
Ana Dulce Félix	Marathon	—N/a						2:30:39	16
Sara Moreira	Marathon	—N/a						Did not finish	
Ana Cabecinha	20 km walk	—N/a						1:29:23	6
Daniela Cardoso	20 km walk	—N/a						1:36:13	37
Inês Henriques	20 km walk	—N/a						1:31:28	12

Field events
Men

Athlete	Event	Qualification		Final	
Athlete	Event	Distance	Rank	Distance	Rank
Nelson Évora	Triple jump	16.99	4 Q	17.03	6
Tsanko Arnaudov	Shot put	18.88	29	Did not advance	

Women

Athlete	Event	Qualification		Final	
Athlete	Event	Distance	Rank	Distance	Rank
Susana Costa	Triple jump	14.12	11 q	14.12	9
Patrícia Mamona	Triple jump	14.18	9 q	14.65 NR	6
Marta Onofre	Pole vault	4.30	=24	Did not advance	
Maria Leonor Tavares	Pole vault	4.15	=29	Did not advance	
Irina Rodrigues	Discus throw	Withdrew due to injury			

== Badminton ==
Portugal has qualified two badminton players for each of the following events into the Olympic tournament. London 2012 Olympians Pedro Martins and Telma Santos picked up one of the spare athlete berths each from host nation Brazil and from the Tripartite Commission as the next highest-ranked eligible players in their respective singles events based on the BWF World Rankings as of 5 May 2016.

Athlete	Event	Group Stage				Elimination	Quarterfinal	Semifinal	Final / BM	
Athlete	Event	Opposition Score	Opposition Score	Opposition Score	Rank	Opposition Score	Opposition Score	Opposition Score	Opposition Score	Rank
Pedro Martins	Men's singles	Ng K L (HKG); L (17–21, 18–21)	Giuffre (CAN); L (21–14, 22–24, 6–21)	—N/a	3	Did not advance				
Telma Santos	Women's singles	Li Xr (CHN); L (12–21, 7–21)	Wang (USA); L (21–18, 10–21, 12–21)	L Tan (BEL); L (16–21, 18–21)	4	Did not advance				

== Canoeing ==
=== Slalom ===
Portugal has qualified one boat in the men's slalom C-1 for the Games, as the International Canoe Federation accepted the nation's request to claim a spare berth freed by Great Britain. The slot was awarded to José Carvalho, who finished among the top 20 canoeists at the 2015 World Championships.

Athlete	Event	Preliminary						Semifinal		Final	
Athlete	Event	Run 1	Rank	Run 2	Rank	Best	Rank	Time	Rank	Time	Rank
José Carvalho	Men's C-1	111.01	17	99.18	8	99.18	11 Q	101.04	9 Q	105.74	9

=== Sprint ===
Portuguese canoeists initially qualified four boats for the Games through the 2015 ICF Canoe Sprint World Championships. Meanwhile, one additional boat was awarded in the women's K-1 200 m by virtue of a top-two national finish at the 2016 European Qualification Regatta in Duisburg, Germany.

Men

Athlete	Event	Heats		Semifinals		Final	
Athlete	Event	Time	Rank	Time	Rank	Time	Rank
Hélder Silva	C-1 200 m	40.578	3 Q	41.162	5 FB	40.388	13
Fernando Pimenta	K-1 1000 m	3:33.140	1 Q	3:33.420	2 FA	3:35.349	5
Emanuel Silva; João Ribeiro	K-2 1000 m	3:26.284	4 Q	3:18.099	1 FA	3:12.889	4
David Fernandes; Fernando Pimenta; João Ribeiro; Emanuel Silva	K-4 1000 m	3:01.498	4 Q	2:58.233	2 FA	3:07.482	6

Women

Athlete	Event	Heats		Semifinals		Final	
Athlete	Event	Time	Rank	Time	Rank	Time	Rank
Francisca Laia	K-1 200 m	41.368	2 Q	41.573	5 FB	42.695	16
Teresa Portela	K-1 500 m	1:56.439	3 Q	1:58.360	4 FB	1:58.058	11

Qualification Legend: FA = Qualify to final (medal); FB = Qualify to final B (non-medal)

== Cycling ==
=== Road ===
Portuguese riders qualified for a maximum of four quota places in the men's Olympic road race by virtue of their top 15 final national ranking in the 2015 UCI World Tour. On 4 July 2016, the Portuguese Cycling Federation announced the selection of former Olympians André Cardoso, Rui Costa and Nelson Oliveira, and of 2016 national road race champion José Mendes, who would take part in his first Olympics.

Athlete	Event	Time	Rank
André Cardoso	Men's road race	6:22:23	36
Rui Costa	Men's road race	6:12:34	10
José Mendes	Men's road race	6:30:05	53
Nelson Oliveira	Men's road race	Did not finish	
Nelson Oliveira	Men's time trial	1:14:15.27	7

=== Mountain biking ===
Portuguese mountain bikers qualified for two men's quota places into the Olympic cross-country race, as a result of the nation's eleventh place in the UCI Olympic Ranking List of 25 May 2016. On 9 June 2016, the Portuguese Cycling Federation announced it had selected Tiago Ferreira and London 2012 Olympian David Rosa as the nation's representatives in this event.

Athlete	Event	Time	Rank
Tiago Ferreira	Men's cross-country	LAP (5 laps)	39
David Rosa	Men's cross-country	LAP (2 laps)	44

== Equestrian ==
Portugal has entered one jumping rider into the Olympic equestrian competition by virtue of a top national finish from South Western Europe in the individual FEI Olympic Rankings.

=== Jumping ===
Athlete	Horse	Event	Qualification								Final					Total	
Athlete	Horse	Event	Round 1		Round 2			Round 3			Round A		Round B			Total	
Athlete	Horse	Event	Penalties	Rank	Penalties	Total	Rank	Penalties	Total	Rank	Penalties	Rank	Penalties	Total	Rank	Penalties	Rank
Luciana Diniz	Fit For Fun 13	Individual	8	=53 Q	0	8	=30 Q	5	13	=33 Q	4	=16 Q	0	4	=9	4	=9

== Football ==
=== Men's tournament ===
Portugal qualified a team of 18 players for the Olympic men's football tournament by reaching the semifinals at the 2015 UEFA European Under-21 Championship in the Czech Republic.

Team roster

The following is the Portugal squad in the men's football tournament of the 2016 Summer Olympics. The team of 18 players was officially named on 14 July. On 17 July, Pité replaced Nuno Santos. On 21 July, Fábio Sturgeon left the squad due to injury and was replaced by Fernando Fonseca.

Head coach: Rui Jorge

No.	Pos.	Player	Date of birth (age)	Caps	Goals	Club
1	GK	Bruno Varela	4 November 1994 (aged 21)	0	0	(Portuguese Football Federation) Vitória de Setúbal
2	DF	Ricardo Esgaio (c)	16 May 1993 (aged 23)	1	0	(Portuguese Football Federation) Sporting CP
3	DF	Tiago Ilori	28 October 1993 (aged 22)	1	0	(The Football Association) Liverpool
4	DF	Tobias Figueiredo	2 February 1994 (aged 22)	1	0	(Portuguese Football Federation) Nacional
5	DF	Edgar Ié	5 May 1994 (aged 22)	0	0	(Royal Spanish Football Federation) Villarreal B
6	MF	Tomás Podstawski	30 January 1995 (aged 21)	0	0	(Portuguese Football Federation) Porto B
7	MF	André Martins*	21 January 1990 (aged 26)	0	0	(Hellenic Football Federation) Olympiacos
8	MF	Sérgio Oliveira*	2 June 1992 (aged 24)	1	0	(Portuguese Football Federation) Porto
9	FW	Gonçalo Paciência	1 August 1994 (aged 22)	0	0	(Portuguese Football Federation) Porto
10	MF	Bruno Fernandes	8 September 1994 (aged 21)	1	0	(Italian Football Federation) Udinese
11	FW	Salvador Agra*	11 November 1991 (aged 24)	0	0	(Portuguese Football Federation) Nacional
12	GK	Joel Castro Pereira	28 June 1996 (aged 20)	0	0	(The Football Association) Manchester United
13	FW	Pité	22 August 1994 (aged 21)	0	0	(Portuguese Football Federation) Tondela
14	DF	Paulo Henrique	23 October 1996 (aged 19)	0	0	(Portuguese Football Federation) Paços de Ferreira
15	MF	Fernando Fonseca	14 March 1997 (aged 19)	0	0	(Portuguese Football Federation) Porto B
16	MF	Francisco Ramos	10 April 1995 (aged 21)	1	0	(Portuguese Football Federation) Chaves
17	FW	Carlos Mané	11 March 1994 (aged 22)	0	0	(Portuguese Football Federation) Sporting CP
18	MF	Tiago Silva	2 June 1993 (aged 23)	0	0	(Portuguese Football Federation) Feirense

* Over-aged player.

Group play

Pos	Team	Pld	W	D	L	GF	GA	GD	Pts	Qualification
1	Portugal	3	2	1	0	5	2	+3	7	Quarter-finals
2	Honduras	3	1	1	1	5	5	0	4	Quarter-finals
3	Argentina	3	1	1	1	3	4	−1	4	
4	Algeria	3	0	1	2	4	6	−2	1	

Source: Rio2016 & FIFA
Rules for classification: Tiebreakers
4 August 2016
18:00

Portugal	2–0	Argentina
Paciência 66'; Pité 84'	Report (Rio2016); Report (FIFA)

Estádio Olímpico João Havelange, Rio de Janeiro
Attendance: 37,407
Referee: Walter López Castellanos (Guatemala)

7 August 2016
15:00

Honduras	1–2	Portugal
Elis 1'	Report (Rio2016); Report (FIFA)	Figueiredo 21'; Paciência 36'

Estádio Olímpico João Havelange, Rio de Janeiro
Attendance: 32,928
Referee: Roddy Zambrano (Ecuador)

10 August 2016
13:00

Algeria	1–1	Portugal
Benkablia 30'	Report (Rio2016); Report (FIFA)	Paciência 25' (pen.)

Mineirão, Belo Horizonte
Attendance: 13,787
Referee: Matthew Conger (New Zealand)

Quarterfinal

13 August 2016
13:00

Portugal	0–4	Germany
	Report (Rio2016); Report (FIFA)	Gnabry 45+1'; Ginter 57'; Selke 75'; Max 87'

Estádio Nacional Mané Garrincha, Brasília
Attendance: 55,412
Referee: Walter López Castellanos (Guatemala)

== Golf ==
Portugal has entered two golfers into the Olympic tournament. Ricardo Gouveia (world no. 125) and José-Filipe Lima (world no. 392) qualified directly among the top 60 players for the men's event based on the IGF World Rankings as of 11 July 2016.

Athlete	Event	Round 1	Round 2	Round 3	Round 4	Total		
Athlete	Event	Score	Score	Score	Score	Score	Par	Rank
Ricardo Gouveia	Men's	73	68	76	80	297	+13	59
José-Filipe Lima	Men's	70	70	77	71	288	+4	=48

== Gymnastics ==
=== Artistic ===
Portugal has entered two artistic gymnasts into the Olympic competition. Gustavo Simões and Ana Filipa Martins claimed their Olympic spots respectively in the men's and women's apparatus and individual all-around events at the Olympic Test Event in Rio de Janeiro. On 22 July, however, the Portuguese federation announced that Simões would fail its debut Olympic participation in Rio de Janeiro due to a foot injury in a preparation event.

Women

Athlete	Event	Qualification						Final					
Athlete	Event	Apparatus				Total	Rank	Apparatus				Total	Rank
Athlete	Event	V	UB	BB	F	Total	Rank	V	UB	BB	F	Total	Rank
Ana Filipa Martins	All-around	13.366	13.666	13.833	13.433	54.298	37	Did not advance					

=== Trampoline ===
Portugal has entered two trampoline gymnasts into the Olympic competition. Diogo Abreu and two-time Olympian Ana Rente claimed their Olympic spots respectively in the men's and women's events at the Olympic Test Event in Rio de Janeiro.

Athlete	Event	Qualification		Final	
Athlete	Event	Score	Rank	Score	Rank
Diogo Abreu	Men's	55.855	16	Did not advance	
Ana Rente	Women's	97.885	11	Did not advance	

== Judo ==
Portugal has qualified a total of six judokas for each of the following weight classes at the Games. Five of them (three men and two women), with Telma Monteiro remarkably going to her fourth Olympics, were ranked among the top 22 eligible judokas for men and top 14 for women in the IJF World Ranking List of 30 May 2016, while Nuno Saraiva at men's lightweight (73 kg) earned a continental quota spot from the European region as the highest-ranked Portuguese judoka outside of direct qualifying position.

Athlete	Event	Round of 64	Round of 32	Round of 16	Quarterfinals	Semifinals	Repechage	Final / BM	
Athlete	Event	Opposition Result	Opposition Result	Opposition Result	Opposition Result	Opposition Result	Opposition Result	Opposition Result	Rank
Sergiu Oleinic	Men's −66 kg	Zantaraia (UKR); W 001–000	Mateo (DOM); L 000–100	Did not advance					
Nuno Saraiva	Men's −73 kg	Ungvári (HUN); L 000–011	Did not advance						
Célio Dias	Men's −90 kg	Bye	Yovo (BEN); L 001–100	Did not advance					
Jorge Fonseca	Men's −100 kg	Bakhshi (AFG); W 100–000	Krpálek (CZE); L 001–010	Did not advance					
Joana Ramos	Women's −52 kg	—N/a	Gasongo (BDI); W 102–000	Ma Yn (CHN); L 000–100	Did not advance				
Telma Monteiro	Women's −57 kg	—N/a	Bye	Manuel (NZL); W 002–000	Dorjsüren (MGL); L 000–000 S	—N/a	Pavia (FRA); W 100–000	Căprioriu (ROU); W 001–000	3rd place, bronze medalist(s)

== Sailing ==
Portuguese sailors have qualified one boat in each of the following classes through the 2014 ISAF Sailing World Championships, the individual fleet Worlds, and European qualifying regattas. On 17 December 2015, three Portuguese sailors had been named to the 2016 Olympic team, including seven-time Olympian João Rodrigues in men's windsurfing. Meanwhile, single-handed sailors Gustavo Lima (Laser), who confirmed his fifth Olympic appearance, and 2012 Olympian Sara Carmo (Laser Radial) had claimed their Olympic spots at the Princess Sofia Trophy Regatta to round out the selection of the sailing squad.

Athlete	Event	Race													Net points	Final rank
Athlete	Event	1	2	3	4	5	6	7	8	9	10	11	12	M*	Net points	Final rank
João Rodrigues	Men's RS:X	21	10	~~23~~	15	15	10	15	12	4	4	12	7	EL	148	11
Gustavo Lima	Men's Laser	15	15	20	~~26~~	15	8	11	28	38	33	—N/a		EL	175	22
José Costa; Jorge Lima	Men's 49er	4	4	18	6	16	~~21~~	11	19	4	9	19	12	EL	122	16
Sara Carmo	Women's Laser Radial	~~34~~	31	22	25	18	13	30	30	26	9	—N/a		EL	235	27

M = Medal race; EL = Eliminated – did not advance into the medal race

== Shooting ==
Portugal has qualified one shooter to compete in the men's pistol events by virtue of his best finish at the 2015 ISSF World Cup series and other selection competitions, as long as he obtained a minimum qualifying score (MQS) by 31 March 2016.

Athlete	Event	Qualification		Final	
Athlete	Event	Points	Rank	Points	Rank
João Costa	Men's 10 m air pistol	578	11	Did not advance	
João Costa	Men's 50 m pistol	554	11	Did not advance	

Qualification Legend: Q = Qualify for the next round; q = Qualify for the bronze medal (shotgun)

== Swimming ==
Portuguese swimmers have so far achieved qualifying standards in the following events (up to a maximum of two swimmers in each event at the Olympic Qualifying Time (OQT), and potentially one at the Olympic Selection Time (OST)):

Athlete	Event	Heat		Semifinal		Final	
Athlete	Event	Time	Rank	Time	Rank	Time	Rank
Diogo Carvalho	Men's 200 m individual medley	2:00.17	19	Did not advance			
Alexis Santos	Men's 200 m individual medley	1:59.67	=12 Q	2:00.08	12	Did not advance	
Alexis Santos	Men's 400 m individual medley	4:15.84 NR	14	—N/a		Did not advance	
Tamila Holub	Women's 800 m freestyle	8:45.36	24	—N/a		Did not advance	
Victoria Kaminskaya	Women's 200 m individual medley	2:16.78	35	Did not advance			
Victoria Kaminskaya	Women's 400 m individual medley	4:46.03	28	—N/a		Did not advance	
Vânia Neves	Women's 10 km open water	—N/a				2:01:39.3	24

== Table tennis ==
Portugal has entered three athletes into the table tennis competition at the Games. Two-time Olympians Tiago Apolónia and Marcos Freitas, along with Chinese-born Yu Fu, secured Olympic spots each in the men's and women's singles, respectively, by winning their group final matches at the European Qualification Tournament in Halmstad, Sweden. Meanwhile, Shao Jieni was automatically selected among the top 22 eligible players to join Yu in the women's singles based on the ITTF Olympic Rankings.

Remarkably going with Apolonia and Freitas to their third Olympics, João Monteiro was awarded the third spot to build the men's team for the Games by virtue of a top 10 national finish in the ITTF Olympic Rankings.

Athlete	Event	Preliminary	Round 1	Round 2	Round 3	Round of 16	Quarterfinals	Semifinals	Final / BM	
Athlete	Event	Opposition Result	Opposition Result	Opposition Result	Opposition Result	Opposition Result	Opposition Result	Opposition Result	Opposition Result	Rank
Tiago Apolónia	Men's singles	Bye			Tokič (SLO); L 1–4	Did not advance				
Marcos Freitas	Men's singles	Bye			Ionescu (ROU); W 4–1	Kou (UKR); W 4–0	Mizutani (JPN); L 2–4	Did not advance		
Tiago Apolónia; Marcos Freitas; João Monteiro	Men's team	—N/a				Austria; L 1–3	Did not advance			
Shao Jieni	Women's singles	Bye		Zhang (USA); L 0–4	Did not advance					
Yu Fu	Women's singles	Bye		Komwong (THA); L 3–4	Did not advance					

== Taekwondo ==
Portugal entered one athlete into the taekwondo competition for the first time at the Olympics since 2008. European Games champion Rui Bragança qualified automatically for the men's flyweight category (58 kg) by finishing in the top 6 WTF Olympic rankings.

Athlete	Event	Round of 16	Quarterfinals	Semifinals	Repechage	Final / BM	
Athlete	Event	Opposition Result	Opposition Result	Opposition Result	Opposition Result	Opposition Result	Rank
Rui Bragança	Men's −58 kg	Muñoz (COL); W 14–2 PTG	Pie (DOM); L 1–4	Did not advance			

== Tennis ==
Portugal has entered two tennis players into the Olympic tournament, signifying the nation's return to the sport for the first time since 2000. João Sousa (world no. 30) qualified directly for the men's singles event as one of the top 56 eligible players in the ATP World Rankings as of 6 June 2016, while Gastão Elias (world no. 88) secured an additional Olympic place as a result of the withdrawal of players with higher ranking. On the second day of the Games, the withdrawal of the German pair from the men's doubles event allowed Elias and Sousa to enter the tournament as alternates.

Athlete	Event	Round of 64	Round of 32	Round of 16	Quarterfinals	Semifinals	Final / BM	
Athlete	Event	Opposition Score	Opposition Score	Opposition Score	Opposition Score	Opposition Score	Opposition Score	Rank
Gastão Elias	Men's singles	Kokkinakis (AUS); W 7–6^{(7–4)}, 7–6^{(7–3)}	Johnson (USA); L 3–6, 4–6	Did not advance				
João Sousa	Men's singles	Haase (NED); W 6–1, 7–5	del Potro (ARG); L 3–6, 6–1, 3–6	Did not advance				
Gastão Elias; João Sousa	Men's doubles	—N/a	Martin / Zelenay (SVK); W 6–4, 6–2	Nestor / Pospisil (CAN); L 1–6, 4–6	Did not advance			

== Triathlon ==
Portugal has qualified a total of three triathletes for the Olympics. Miguel Arraiolos, João José Pereira, and João Pedro Silva were ranked among the top 40 eligible triathletes in the men's event based on the ITU Olympic Qualification List as of 15 May 2016.

Athlete	Event	Swim (1.5 km)	Trans 1	Bike (40 km)	Trans 2	Run (10 km)	Total Time	Rank
Miguel Arraiolos	Men's	18:44	0:50	59:04	0:35	34:57	1:53:35	44
João José Pereira	Men's	18:03	0:46	55:52	0:33	30:38	1:45:52	5
João Pedro Silva	Men's	18:08	0:49	56:22	0:39	35:35	1:51:33	35

== See also ==
- Portugal at the 2016 Summer Paralympics
