= Nae Udaka =

Japanese judoka (born 1985)

Personal information
- Nationality: Japanese
- Born: 6 March 1985 (age 41)
- Occupation: Judoka

Sport
- Country: Japan
- Sport: Judo
- Weight class: –57 kg

Achievements and titles
- World Champ.: (2014)
Medal record
Women's judo
Representing Japan
World Championships
Gold medal – first place	2014 Chelyabinsk	‍–‍57 kg
Gold medal – first place	2017 Budapest	Mixed team
World Masters
Silver medal – second place	2010 Suwon	‍–‍57 kg
Bronze medal – third place	2015 Rabat	‍–‍57 kg
IJF Grand Slam
Gold medal – first place	2013 Tokyo	‍–‍57 kg
Silver medal – second place	2009 Rio de Janeiro	‍–‍57 kg
Silver medal – second place	2014 Paris	‍–‍57 kg
Silver medal – second place	2016 Tokyo	‍–‍57 kg
Silver medal – second place	2017 Ekaterinburg	‍–‍57 kg
Bronze medal – third place	2010 Paris	‍–‍57 kg
Bronze medal – third place	2013 Paris	‍–‍57 kg
Bronze medal – third place	2015 Paris	‍–‍57 kg
Bronze medal – third place	2017 Tokyo	‍–‍57 kg
IJF Grand Prix
Gold medal – first place	2009 Tunis	‍–‍57 kg
Gold medal – first place	2010 Qingdao	‍–‍57 kg
Silver medal – second place	2016 Budapest	‍–‍57 kg
Bronze medal – third place	2017 Düsseldorf	‍–‍57 kg
Summer Universiade
Gold medal – first place	2007 Bangkok	‍–‍57 kg

Profile at external databases
- IJF: 2160
- JudoInside.com: 35486
- Updated on 4 July 2023

Nae Udaka (宇高 菜絵, Udaka Nae; born 6 March 1985 in Saijō, Ehime) is a female Japanese judoka.

== Judo career ==
She started judo at the age of 6.

Her favorite technique is Osotogari.

In 2007, she belonged to Komatsu Limited after graduating from Teikyo University.

She has been a shadow of Kaori Matsumoto, who is an Olympic and World champion.

In 2013, she won the gold medal in the ‍–‍57 kg weight class at 2013 Tokyo Grand Slam by defeating olympic bronze medalist Marti Malloy.

In 2014, she won the gold medal in the lightweight division (‍–‍57 kg) at the 2014 World Judo Championships at the age of 29.
