= Judo at the 2011 Pan American Games – Women's 57 kg =

Women's 57 kg at the 2011 Pan American Games
- Venue: CODE II Gymnasium
- Dates: October 28
- Competitors: 10 from 10 nations

Medalists
Gold medal	Yurisleidy Lupetey	Cuba
Silver medal	Rafaela Silva	Brazil
Bronze medal	Joliane Melançon	Canada
Bronze medal	Hana Carmichael	United States

The women's 57 kg competition of the judo events at the 2011 Pan American Games in Guadalajara, Mexico, was held on October 28 at the CODE II Gymanasium. The defending champion was Danielle Zangrando of Brazil.

== Schedule ==
All times are Central Standard Time (UTC−6).

Date	Time	Round
October 28, 2011	11:16	Preliminaries
October 28, 2011	12:04	Quarterfinals
October 28, 2011	13:56	Semifinals
October 28, 2011	14:28	Repechage
October 28, 2011	17:24	Bronze medal matches
October 28, 2011	17:40	Final

== Results ==
Legend

- 1st number = Ippon
- 2nd number = Waza-ari
- 3rd number = Yuko

=== Bracket ===
Preliminaries
Diana Villavicencio (ECU)	002
Ana León (MEX)	000
Hana Carmichael (USA)	001
Flor Velázquez (VEN)	000

Quarter Finals
Rafaela Silva (BRA)	101
Joliane Melançon (CAN)	000
Yadinis Amarís (COL)	110
Diana Villavicencio (ECU)	002
Yurisleidy Lupetey (CUB)	100
Belén Achurra (CHI)	000
Melissa Rodríguez (ARG)	100
Hana Carmichael (USA)	000

Semi Finals
Rafaela Silva (BRA)	011
Yadinis Amarís (COL)	000
Yurisleidy Lupetey (CUB)	111
Melissa Rodríguez (ARG)	000

Final
Rafaela Silva (BRA)	000
Yurisleidy Lupetey (CUB)	001

=== Repechage round ===
Two bronze medals were awarded.

Semifinals
Joliane Melançon (CAN)	010
Diana Villavicencio (ECU)	001
Belén Achurra (CHI)	000
Hana Carmichael (USA)	120

Finals
Joliane Melançon (CAN)	100
Melissa Rodríguez (ARG)	000
Yadinis Amarís (COL)	000
Hana Carmichael (USA)	010
