= Judo at the 2015 Pan American Games – Women's 57 kg =

Women's 57 kg at the 2015 Pan American Games
- Venue: Mississauga Sports Centre
- Dates: July 12
- Competitors: 10 from 10 nations

Medalists
Gold medal	Marti Malloy	United States
Silver medal	Catherine Beauchemin-Pinard	Canada
Bronze medal	Rafaela Silva	Brazil
Bronze medal	Aliuska Ojeda	Cuba

The women's 57 kg competition of the judo events at the 2015 Pan American Games in Toronto, Canada, was held on July 12 at the Mississauga Sports Centre.

== Schedule ==
All times are Central Standard Time (UTC−6).

Date	Time	Round
July 12, 2015	15:37	Preliminary bout
July 12, 2015	15:58	Quarterfinals
July 12, 2015	16:19	Repechage
July 12, 2015	17:08	Semifinals
July 12, 2015	20:21	Bronze medal matches
July 12, 2015	20:35	Final

== Results ==
Legend

- 1st number = Ippon
- 2nd number = Waza-ari
- 3rd number = Yuko

=== Bracket ===
Preliminaries
Anriquelis Barrios (VEN)	100
Jeannette Rodriguez (PUR)	000
Luisa Jiménez (DOM)	000S2
Aliuska Ojeda (CUB)	000S1

Quarter Finals
Marti Malloy (USA)	100S1
Anriquelis Barrios (VEN)	000S2
Yadinis Amarís (COL)	000S1
Joselin Plaza (ECU)	001S2
Rafaela Silva (BRA)	011S1
Gabriela Narváez (ARG)	000S1
Catherine Beauchemin-Pinard (CAN)	100
Aliuska Ojeda (CUB)	000

Semi Finals
Marti Malloy (USA)	100
Joselin Plaza (ECU)	000
Rafaela Silva (BRA)	000
Catherine Beauchemin-Pinard (CAN)	100S1

Final
Marti Malloy (USA)	001S1
Catherine Beauchemin-Pinard (CAN)	000S1

=== Repechage round ===
Two bronze medals were awarded.

Repechage		Bronze medal
Anriquelis Barrios (VEN)	100S2
Yadinis Amarís (COL)	000	Anriquelis Barrios (VEN)	000S1
		Rafaela Silva (BRA)	012

Repechage		Bronze medal
Gabriela Narváez (ARG)	000
Aliuska Ojeda (CUB)	100	Aliuska Ojeda (CUB)	000S1
		Joselin Plaza (ECU)	000S2
