= Judo at the 2012 Summer Olympics – Women's 57 kg =

Women's 57kg at the Games of the XXX Olympiad
- Venue: ExCeL Exhibition Centre
- Date: 30 July 2012
- Competitors: 25 from 25 nations
- Winning score: 100-

Medalists
1st place, gold medalist(s)		Kaori Matsumoto	Japan
2nd place, silver medalist(s)		Corina Căprioriu	Romania
3rd place, bronze medalist(s)		Marti Malloy	United States
3rd place, bronze medalist(s)		Automne Pavia	France

Women's 57 kg competition in judo at the 2012 Summer Olympics in London, United Kingdom, took place at ExCeL London.

The gold and silver medals were determined by a single-elimination tournament, with the winner of the final taking gold and the loser receiving silver. Judo events awarded two bronze medals. Quarterfinal losers competed in a repechage match for the right to face a semifinal loser for a bronze medal (that is, the judokas defeated in quarterfinals A and B competed against each other, with the winner of that match facing the semifinal loser from the other half of the bracket).

== Schedule ==
All times are British Summer Time (UTC+1)

Date	Time	Round
Monday, 30 July 2012	09:30; 14:00; 16:10	Qualifications; Semifinals; Final

== Results ==
=== Finals ===
Semi-finals
Kaori Matsumoto (JPN)	0010
Automne Pavia (FRA)	0000
Marti Malloy (USA)	0001
Corina Căprioriu (ROU)	1001

Final
Kaori Matsumoto (JPN)	100–
Corina Căprioriu (ROU)	000H

=== Repechages ===
Repechage		Bronze medal
Giulia Quintavalle (ITA)	0100
Sabrina Filzmoser (AUT)	0001	Giulia Quintavalle (ITA)	0001
		Marti Malloy (USA)	1000

Repechage		Bronze medal
Irina Zabludina (RUS)	0000
Hedvig Karakas (HUN)	0011	Hedvig Karakas (HUN)	0002
		Automne Pavia (FRA)	0011

=== Pool A ===
First Round
K Matsumoto (JPN)	0011
V Đukić (SLO)	0002
J-D Kim (KOR)	0001
S Dorjsürengiin (MGL)	0001

Second Round
K Matsumoto (JPN)	0010
K Gasimova (AZE)	0000
J-D Kim (KOR)	0002
G Quintavalle (ITA)	1011

Quarterfinals
K Matsumoto (JPN)	0010
G Quintavalle (ITA)	0001

=== Pool B ===
First Round
A Pavia (FRA)	0010
S Clark (GBR)	0001
S Filzmoser (AUT)	0100
J Melançon (CAN)	0010

Second Round
C Renzi (AUS)	0003
A Pavia (FRA)	0151
H Diedhiou (SEN)	0001
S Filzmoser (AUT)	1001

Quarterfinals
A Pavia (FRA)	0031
S Filzmoser (AUT)	0002

=== Pool C ===
First Round
T Monteiro (POR)	0000
M Malloy (USA)	0001
I Boukouvala (GRE)	0001
Y Lupetey Cobas (CUB)	0011

Second Round
M Malloy (USA)	1000
Y Amaris (COL)	0000
Y Lupetey Cobas (CUB)	0001
I Zabludina (RUS)	0100

Quarterfinals
M Malloy (USA)	0012
I Zabludina (RUS)	0011

=== Pool D ===
First Round		Second Round		Quarterfinals
R Silva (BRA)	0021
M Roper (GER)	0002	R Silva (BRA)	0000
C Bellorín (ESP)	0011	H Karakas (HUN)	0100
H Karakas (HUN)	0100			H Karakas (HUN)	0000
C Căprioriu (ROU)	0102			C Căprioriu (ROU)	0000
H Wang (CHN)	0000	C Căprioriu (ROU)	0100
		S Raguib (DJI)	0000
