= Aiko Satō (judoka) =

Japanese judoka (born 1983)

Personal information
- Born: 18 October 1983 (age 42)
- Occupation: Judoka

Sport
- Country: Japan
- Sport: Judo
- Weight class: ‍–‍57 kg

Achievements and titles
- Olympic Games: 7th (2008)
- World Champ.: (2011)
- Asian Champ.: (gold) (2007, 2011)
Medal record
Women's judo
Representing Japan
World Championships
Gold medal – first place	2011 Paris	‍–‍57 kg
Bronze medal – third place	2007 Rio de Janeiro	‍–‍57 kg
Asian Games
Silver medal – second place	2006 Doha	‍–‍57 kg
Asian Championships
Gold medal – first place	2007 Kuwait City	‍–‍57 kg
Gold medal – first place	2011 Abu Dhabi	‍–‍57 kg
Silver medal – second place	2003 Jeju	‍–‍52 kg
World Masters
Bronze medal – third place	2012 Almaty	‍–‍57 kg
IJF Grand Slam
Gold medal – first place	2011 Moscow	‍–‍57 kg
Silver medal – second place	2011 Paris	‍–‍57 kg
Silver medal – second place	2011 Tokyo	‍–‍57 kg
Silver medal – second place	2012 Paris	‍–‍57 kg
Bronze medal – third place	2009 Tokyo	‍–‍57 kg
IJF Grand Prix
Gold medal – first place	2010 Rotterdam	‍–‍57 kg
World Juniors Championships
Gold medal – first place	2002 Jeju	‍–‍52 kg
Bronze medal – third place	2000 Nabeul	‍–‍52 kg
Asian Junior Championships
Silver medal – second place	2001 Ho Chi Minh City	‍–‍52 kg

Profile at external databases
- IJF: 1791
- JudoInside.com: 12718
- Updated on 17 July 2023

Aiko Satō (佐藤 愛子, Satō Aiko; born 18 October 1983) is a female Japanese judoka from Tsukuba University. She won the gold medal in the lightweight division (57 kg) at the 2011 World Judo Championships. She is a highly skilled technician of using newaza.

She competed for Japan at the 2008 Summer Olympics in the women's 57 kg event.
