= Judo at the 2019 Pan American Games – Women's 57 kg =

Women's 57 kg at the 2019 Pan American Games
- Venue: Polideportivo 3
- Dates: August 9
- Competitors: 10 from 10 nations

Medalists
Gold medal	Ana Rosa García	Dominican Republic
Silver medal	Yadinis Amarís	Colombia
Bronze medal	Anailys Dorvigny	Cuba
Bronze medal	Miryam Roper	Panama

The women's 57 kg competition of the judo events at the 2019 Pan American Games in Lima, Peru, was held on August 9 at the Polideportivo 3.

Rafaela Silva of Brazil originally won the gold medal, but she was stripped of the medal after testing positive for doping with fenoterol after the Games.

== Results ==
All times are local (UTC−5)

=== Bracket ===
Round of 16
Cynthia Rahming (BAH)	00S3
Kiara Arango (PER)	10
Elizabeth García (MEX)	10
Sophia Petrocchi (ARU)	00S1

Quarter Finals
Ana Rosa García (DOM)	10S1
Kiara Arango (PER)	00S1
Yadinis Amarís (COL)	01S2
Miryam Roper (PAN)	10S1
Anailys Dorvigny (CUB)	10S1
Elizabeth García (MEX)	00S3
~~Rafaela Silva (BRA)~~	10
Amelia Fulgentes (USA)	00S3

Semi Finals
Ana Rosa García (DOM)	10S2
Miryam Roper (PAN)	00S1
Anailys Dorvigny (CUB)	00
~~Rafaela Silva (BRA)~~	10

Final
Ana Rosa García (DOM)	00
~~Rafaela Silva (BRA)~~	~~11~~

=== Repechage round ===
Two bronze medals were awarded.

Repechage		Bronze medal
Kiara Arango (PER)	00
Yadinis Amarís (COL)	10	Yadinis Amarís (COL)	10S2
		Anailys Dorvigny (CUB)	00

Repechage		Bronze medal
Elizabeth García (MEX)	10
Amelia Fulgentes (USA)	00S3	Elizabeth García (MEX)	00S1
		Miryam Roper (PAN)	10S1
