= Joliane Melançon =

Canadian judoka (born 1986)

Personal information
- Born: 22 March 1986 (age 40)
- Occupation: Judoka

Sport
- Country: Canada
- Sport: Judo
- Weight class: ‍–‍57 kg

Achievements and titles
- Olympic Games: R32 (2012)
- World Champ.: R16 (2009, 2011)
- Pan American Champ.: (2009, 2010, 2011, 2012)
Medal record
Women's judo
Representing Canada
Pan American Games
Bronze medal – third place	2011 Guadalajara	‍–‍57 kg
Pan American Championships
Bronze medal – third place	2009 Buenos Aires	‍–‍57 kg
Bronze medal – third place	2010 San Salvador	‍–‍57 kg
Bronze medal – third place	2011 Guadalajara	‍–‍57 kg
Bronze medal – third place	2012 Montreal	‍–‍57 kg
IJF Grand Slam
Silver medal – second place	2013 Baku	‍–‍57 kg
IJF Grand Prix
Silver medal – second place	2012 Baku	‍–‍57 kg

Profile at external databases
- IJF: 130
- JudoInside.com: 27087
- Updated on 27 November 2022

Joliane L. Melançon (born 22 March 1986 in Blainville, Québec) is a judoka from Canada.

Melançon was born in Blainville, a suburb of Montreal. She began with judo at age 8. She had to choose between judo and violin. She has always been more interested in sport so she chose judo. Now she trains in Club de judo de Varennes under Denis Mechin. She studies physical education at UQAM.

- In 2009, Melançon competed at 2009 World Judo Championships in Rotterdam. She lost close match with Polish judoka Małgorzata Bielak.
- Melançon won a bronze medal at Pan American Judo Championships in 2009 and 2010.
- Melançon won a bronze medal for Canada at the 2011 Pan American Judo Championships.
- Melançon represented Canada at the 2012 Summer Olympics in the 57 kg category.

Year	Tournament	Place	Weight class
2009	Pan American Judo Championships	3rd	Lightweight (–57 kg)
2009	World Judo Championships	AC	Lightweight (–57 kg)
2010	Pan American Judo Championships	3rd	Lightweight (–57 kg)
2011	Pan American Judo Championships	3rd	Lightweight (–57 kg)

== See also ==
- Judo in Quebec
- Judo in Canada
- List of Canadian judoka
