= Vesna Đukić =

Slovenian judoka (born 1986)

Personal information
- Born: 1 January 1986 (age 40)
- Occupation: Judoka

Sport
- Country: Slovenia
- Sport: Judo
- Weight class: –57 kg

Achievements and titles
- Olympic Games: R32 (2012)
- European Champ.: 9th (2006, 2007)
Medal record
Women's judo
Representing Slovenia
IJF Grand Prix
Bronze medal – third place	2010 Rotterdam	–57 kg
Bronze medal – third place	2012 Qingdao	–57 kg
European U23 Championships
Silver medal – second place	2007 Salzburg	–57 kg

Profile at external databases
- IJF: 3728
- JudoInside.com: 27039
- Updated on 29 December 2022

Vesna Đukić (born 1 January 1986 in Celje, SR Slovenia) is a Slovenian judoka. She competed in the 57 kg event at the 2012 Summer Olympics and lost in the first round. She is of Bosnian Serb descent.
