= Carli Renzi =

Australian female judoka and wrestler

Personal information
- Nationality: Australian
- Born: 24 October 1982 (age 44) East Melbourne, Victoria, Australia
- Height: 167 cm (5 ft 6 in) (2012)
- Weight: 57 kg (126 lb) (2012)

Sport
- Country: Australia
- Sport: Judo; Freestyle wrestling
- Club: Dominance Mixed Martial Arts

Achievements and titles
- World finals: 2012 Summer Olympics
- Regional finals: 2010 Commonwealth Games
Medal record
Womeh's judo
Representing Australia
Oceania Judo Championships
| Gold medal – first place | 2006 Papeete | 57 kg |
| Gold medal – first place | 2010 Canberra | 57 kg |
| Gold medal – first place | 2011 Papeete | 57 kg |
| Gold medal – first place | 2012 Cairns | 57 kg |
| Silver medal – second place | 2003 Suva | 57 kg |
| Silver medal – second place | 2004 Noumea | 57 kg |
| Silver medal – second place | 2008 Christchurch | 57 kg |

Carli Renzi (born 24 October 1982) is an Australian judo competitor and wrestler. She represented Australia in wrestling at the 2010 Commonwealth Games in the women's freestyle –59 kg event and in judo at the 2012 Summer Olympics the women's –57 kg event.

== Personal life ==
Nicknamed Carli, Renzi was born on 24 October 1982 in East Melbourne, Victoria. She attended St Mary's Primary School, Greensborough before going to Eltham College. She then attended Deakin University from 2001 to 2005 where she earned a Bachelor of Commerce with Honours in Finance. As of 2012, she lives in Melbourne, Victoria. While Renzi is primarily a judo and wrestling competitor, other sport disciplines she is involved with include Brazilian Jiu-Jitsu, a sport she took up to help her gain Olympic selection. Renzi is 167 centimetres (66 in) tall and weighs 57 kilograms (126 lb).

== Wrestling ==
Renzi started wrestling in 2007. She represented Australia at the 2010 Commonwealth Games in freestyle wrestling, finishing sixth in the U/59 kg division. Frequently, when men found out Renzi was a wrestler, they asked her if she did mud or jelly wrestling. Going into the 2010 Commonwealth Games, she trained with Emily Bensted. People at Renzi's place of employment did not believe she was going to the Commonwealth Games to compete in the sport.

== Judo ==
Renzi started in the sport when she was seven years old and initially fought against boys in the mixed U/20 kg division. She is a member of Dominance Mixed Martial Arts and has a judo scholarship with the Australian Institute of Sport. She was coached by Daniel Kelly and Maria Pekli since 2003. Her primary training base is in Melbourne, with a secondary training base in Canberra.

At the Australian Championships in the 2005, 2006, 2007, 2011 and 2012 Renzi took home gold. She finished 9th in the U/57 kg category at the 2011 Tokyo Grand Slam in Tokyo, Japan. She finished 2nd in the U/57 kg category at the 2011 Apia World Cup in Apia, Western Samoa. She finished 3rd in the U/57 kg category at the 2011 US Open in Miami. She finished 1st in the U/57 kg category at the 2012 Oceania Championships in Cairns, Australia. She finished 9th in the U/57 kg category at the 2012 Budapest World Cup event in Budapest, Hungary. She was selected to represent Australia at the 2012 Summer Olympics in judo in the 52 – 57 kg — Women event. The Games were her first. She reached the third round, losing to eventual bronze medalist, Automne Pavia.
