= 2011 World Judo Championships =

Judo competition

Judo 2011 World Judo Championships
- Venue: Accor Arena
- Location: Paris, France
- Dates: 23–28 August
- Competitors: 864 from 131 nations

Champions
- Men's team: France (2nd title)
- Women's team: France (2nd title)

Competition at external databases
- Links: IJF • EJU • JudoInside

Judo 2011 World Championships Paris-Rothberg EST Vs Mendonca BRA -73kg

The 2011 World Judo Championships were held at the Palais Omnisports de Paris-Bercy in Paris, France from 23 to 28 August.

== Schedule ==
Event date	Starting time	Event details
23 August	15:30	Men –60 kg
23 August	15:30	Men –66 kg
23 August	15:30	Women –48 kg
24 August	15:30	Men –73 kg
24 August	15:30	Women –52 kg
24 August	15:30	Women –57 kg
25 August	15:30	Men –81 kg
25 August	15:30	Women –63 kg
26 August	15:30	Men –90 kg
26 August	15:30	Women –70 kg
26 August	15:30	Women –78 kg
27 August	15:30	Men –100 kg
27 August	15:30	Men +100 kg
27 August	15:30	Women +78 kg
28 August	15:00	Men team
28 August	15:00	Women team

== Medal summary ==
=== Men's events ===
Event	Gold	Silver	Bronze
Extra-lightweight (60 kg)	Rishod Sobirov (UZB)	Hiroaki Hiraoka (JPN)	Ilgar Mushkiyev (AZE)
Extra-lightweight (60 kg)	Rishod Sobirov (UZB)	Hiroaki Hiraoka (JPN)	Georgii Zantaraia (UKR)
Half-lightweight (66 kg)	Masashi Ebinuma (JPN)	Leandro Cunha (BRA)	Cho Jun-Ho (KOR)
Half-lightweight (66 kg)	Masashi Ebinuma (JPN)	Leandro Cunha (BRA)	Musa Mogushkov (RUS)
Lightweight (73 kg)	Riki Nakaya (JPN)	Dex Elmont (NED)	Navruz Jurakobilov (UZB)
Lightweight (73 kg)	Riki Nakaya (JPN)	Dex Elmont (NED)	Ugo Legrand (FRA)
Half-middleweight (81 kg)	Kim Jae-Bum (KOR)	Srđan Mrvaljević (MNE)	Leandro Guilheiro (BRA)
Half-middleweight (81 kg)	Kim Jae-Bum (KOR)	Srđan Mrvaljević (MNE)	Sergiu Toma (MDA)
Middleweight (90 kg)	Ilias Iliadis (GRE)	Daiki Nishiyama (JPN)	Takashi Ono (JPN)
Middleweight (90 kg)	Ilias Iliadis (GRE)	Daiki Nishiyama (JPN)	Asley González (CUB)
Half-heavyweight (100 kg)	Tagir Khaybulaev (RUS)	Maxim Rakov (KAZ)	Irakli Tsirekidze (GEO)
Half-heavyweight (100 kg)	Tagir Khaybulaev (RUS)	Maxim Rakov (KAZ)	Lukas Krpalek (CZE)
Heavyweight (+100 kg)	Teddy Riner (FRA)	Andreas Tölzer (GER)	Aleksandr Mikhailine (RUS)
Heavyweight (+100 kg)	Teddy Riner (FRA)	Andreas Tölzer (GER)	Kim Sung-Min (KOR)
Team	France	Brazil	South Korea
Team	France	Brazil	Japan

=== Women's events ===
Event	Gold	Silver	Bronze
Extra-lightweight (48 kg)	Haruna Asami (JPN)	Tomoko Fukumi (JPN)	Éva Csernoviczki (HUN)
Extra-lightweight (48 kg)	Haruna Asami (JPN)	Tomoko Fukumi (JPN)	Sarah Menezes (BRA)
Half-lightweight (52 kg)	Misato Nakamura (JPN)	Yuka Nishida (JPN)	Ana Carrascosa (ESP)
Half-lightweight (52 kg)	Misato Nakamura (JPN)	Yuka Nishida (JPN)	Andreea Chițu (ROU)
Lightweight (57 kg)	Aiko Sato (JPN)	Rafaela Silva (BRA)	Corina Căprioriu (ROU)
Lightweight (57 kg)	Aiko Sato (JPN)	Rafaela Silva (BRA)	Kaori Matsumoto (JPN)
Half-middleweight (63 kg)	Gévrise Émane (FRA)	Yoshie Ueno (JPN)	Anicka van Emden (NED)
Half-middleweight (63 kg)	Gévrise Émane (FRA)	Yoshie Ueno (JPN)	Urška Žolnir (SLO)
Middleweight (70 kg)	Lucie Décosse (FRA)	Edith Bosch (NED)	Yoriko Kunihara (JPN)
Middleweight (70 kg)	Lucie Décosse (FRA)	Edith Bosch (NED)	Anett Mészáros (HUN)
Half-heavyweight (78 kg)	Audrey Tcheuméo (FRA)	Akari Ogata (JPN)	Kayla Harrison (USA)
Half-heavyweight (78 kg)	Audrey Tcheuméo (FRA)	Akari Ogata (JPN)	Mayra Aguiar (BRA)
Heavyweight (+78 kg)	Tong Wen (CHN)	Qin Qian (CHN)	Mika Sugimoto (JPN)
Heavyweight (+78 kg)	Tong Wen (CHN)	Qin Qian (CHN)	Elena Ivashchenko (RUS)
Team	France	Japan	Germany
Team	France	Japan	Cuba

=== Medal table ===
* Host nation (France)

Rank	Nation	Gold	Silver	Bronze	Total
1	France*	6	0	1	7
2	Japan	5	7	5	17
3	China	1	1	0	2
4	Russia	1	0	3	4
4	South Korea	1	0	3	4
6	Uzbekistan	1	0	1	2
7	Greece	1	0	0	1
8	Brazil	0	3	3	6
9	Netherlands	0	2	1	3
10	Germany	0	1	1	2
11	Kazakhstan	0	1	0	1
11	Montenegro	0	1	0	1
13	Cuba	0	0	2	2
13	Hungary	0	0	2	2
13	Romania	0	0	2	2
16	Azerbaijan	0	0	1	1
16	Czech Republic	0	0	1	1
16	Georgia	0	0	1	1
16	Moldova	0	0	1	1
16	Slovenia	0	0	1	1
16	Spain	0	0	1	1
16	Ukraine	0	0	1	1
16	United States	0	0	1	1
Totals (23 entries)		16	16	32	64

== Participating nations ==
871 competitors from 132 nations compete.

- Algeria (12)
- American Samoa (1)
- Andorra (3)
- Angola (3)
- Argentina (5)
- Armenia (4)
- Australia (14)
- Austria (5)
- Azerbaijan (10)
- Barbados (2)
- Belarus (3)
- Belgium (6)
- Benin (2)
- Bosnia and Herzegovina (3)
- Botswana (1)
- Brazil (19)
- Bulgaria (5)
- Burkina Faso (3)
- Cameroon (11)
- Canada (11)
- Cape Verde (4)
- Chad (2)
- China (22)
- Chinese Taipei (3)
- Colombia (8)
- Ivory Coast (2)
- Croatia (3)
- Cuba (15)
- Curaçao (1)
- Cyprus (2)
- Czech Republic (6)
- Denmark (2)
- Djibouti (2)
- Dominican Republic (2)
- Ecuador (3)
- Egypt (4)
- El Salvador (2)
- Estonia (5)
- Ethiopia (2)
- Fiji (3)
- Finland (5)
- France (28)
- Gabon (1)
- Georgia (13)
- Germany (19)
- Ghana (4)
- Greece (6)
- Guatemala (1)
- Guam (2)
- Haiti (7)
- Honduras (1)
- Hong Kong (3)
- Hungary (13)
- India (11)
- Iran (4)
- Ireland (1)
- Iceland (2)
- Israel (9)
- Italy (14)
- Japan (28)
- Kazakhstan (24)
- Kenya (3)
- Kosovo (2)
- Kyrgyzstan (10)
- Laos (1)
- Latvia (6)
- Lebanon (4)
- Lithuania (9)
- Luxembourg (2)
- Macau (4)
- Macedonia (2)
- Madagascar (2)
- Mali (2)
- Malta (4)
- Mauritius (3)
- Mexico (8)
- Moldova (9)
- Montenegro (3)
- Monaco (1)
- Mongolia (23)
- Morocco (13)
- Mozambique (7)
- Nauru (1)
- Netherlands (14)
- Nepal (2)
- New Zealand (4)
- Nigeria (5)
- North Korea (9)
- Niger (2)
- Pakistan (2)
- Palestine (1)
- Panama (2)
- Papua New Guinea (2)
- Paraguay (2)
- Peru (4)
- Philippines (2)
- Poland (13)
- Portugal (7)
- Qatar (3)
- Romania (8)
- Russia (28)
- Samoa (2)
- Saudi Arabia (2)
- Senegal (8)
- Serbia (7)
- Sierra Leone (3)
- Slovakia (3)
- Slovenia (8)
- Solomon Islands (2)
- South Africa (2)
- South Korea (27)
- Sri Lanka (2)
- Spain (13)
- Switzerland (7)
- Sweden (4)
- Tajikistan (6)
- Thailand (8)
- Togo (2)
- Tunisia (3)
- Turkey (11)
- Turkmenistan (13)
- Ukraine (22)
- United Arab Emirates (2)
- United Kingdom (15)
- Uruguay (1)
- United States (25)
- Uzbekistan (15)
- Vanuatu (2)
- Venezuela (8)
- Vietnam (4)
- Yemen (2)
- Zambia (2)
