= Sanne Verhagen =

Dutch judoka (born 1992)

Personal information
- Nationality: Dutch
- Born: 24 August 1992 (age 33) Best, Netherlands
- Occupation: Judoka

Sport
- Country: Netherlands
- Sport: Judo
- Weight class: –57 kg

Achievements and titles
- Olympic Games: R16 (2016, 2020)
- World Champ.: (bronze) (2014)
- European Champ.: 5th (2013, 2015, 2019)
Medal record
Women's judo
Representing the Netherlands
World Championships
Bronze medal – third place	2014 Chelyabinsk	‍–‍57 kg
IJF Grand Slam
Bronze medal – third place	2015 Tyumen	‍–‍57 kg
IJF Grand Prix
Silver medal – second place	2015 Samsun	‍–‍57 kg
Bronze medal – third place	2014 Qingdao	‍–‍57 kg
Bronze medal – third place	2019 Tbilisi	‍–‍57 kg
European U23 Championships
Silver medal – second place	2012 Prague	‍–‍57 kg
World Juniors Championships
Silver medal – second place	2011 Cape Town	‍–‍57 kg
European Junior Championships
Silver medal – second place	2011 Lommel	‍–‍57 kg
European Cadet Championships
Gold medal – first place	2008 Sarajevo	‍–‍48 kg

Profile at external databases
- IJF: 3435
- JudoInside.com: 32233
- Updated on 4 July 2023

Sanne Verhagen (born 24 August 1992) is a Dutch judoka. She competed at the 2016 Summer Olympics in the women's 57 kg event, in which she was eliminated in the second round by Dorjsürengiin Sumiyaa. She also competed in the women's 57 kg event at the 2020 Summer Olympics held in Tokyo, Japan.
