= Automne Pavia =

French Olympic judoka (born 1989)

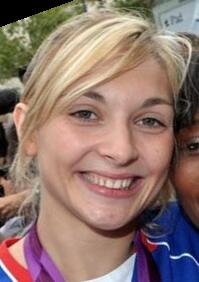
- Pavia in 2012

Personal information
- Born: 3 January 1989 (age 37) Péronne, Somme, France
- Occupation: Judoka

Sport
- Country: France
- Sport: Judo
- Weight class: ‍–‍57 kg

Achievements and titles
- Olympic Games: (bronze) (2012)
- World Champ.: (bronze) (2014, 2015)
- European Champ.: (gold) (2013, 2014, 2016)
Medal record
Women's judo
Representing France
Olympic Games
Bronze medal – third place	2012 London	‍–‍57 kg
World Championships
Bronze medal – third place	2014 Chelyabinsk	‍–‍57 kg
Bronze medal – third place	2015 Astana	‍–‍57 kg
European Championships
Gold medal – first place	2013 Budapest	‍–‍57 kg
Gold medal – first place	2014 Montpellier	‍–‍57 kg
Gold medal – first place	2016 Kazan	‍–‍57 kg
Bronze medal – third place	2012 Chelyabinsk	‍–‍57 kg
World Masters
Silver medal – second place	2013 Tyumen	‍–‍57 kg
IJF Grand Slam
Gold medal – first place	2011 Paris	‍–‍57 kg
Gold medal – first place	2013 Paris	‍–‍57 kg
Silver medal – second place	2011 Moscow	‍–‍57 kg
Bronze medal – third place	2011 Rio de Janeiro	‍–‍57 kg
Bronze medal – third place	2012 Paris	‍–‍57 kg
Bronze medal – third place	2012 Tokyo	‍–‍57 kg
Bronze medal – third place	2014 Paris	‍–‍57 kg
IJF Grand Prix
Gold medal – first place	2010 Tunis	‍–‍57 kg
Gold medal – first place	2013 Düsseldorf	‍–‍57 kg
Gold medal – first place	2014 Havana	‍–‍57 kg
Gold medal – first place	2014 Jeju	‍–‍57 kg
Silver medal – second place	2010 Qingdao	‍–‍57 kg
Silver medal – second place	2016 Samsun	‍–‍57 kg
Bronze medal – third place	2011 Abu Dhabi	‍–‍57 kg
Bronze medal – third place	2015 Düsseldorf	‍–‍57 kg
Bronze medal – third place	2016 Almaty	‍–‍57 kg
World Juniors Championships
Silver medal – second place	2008 Bangkok	‍–‍57 kg
European Junior Championships
Gold medal – first place	2007 Prague	‍–‍57 kg
Bronze medal – third place	2006 Tallinn	‍–‍57 kg

Profile at external databases
- IJF: 1897
- JudoInside.com: 37700
- Updated on 28 May 2023

Automne Pavia (born 3 January 1989) is a French judoka. In 2012, she won bronze at the 2012 Summer Olympics in the class ‍–‍57 kg.

At the 2012 Summer Olympics, Pavia beat Sarah Clark, Carli Renzi and Sabrina Filzmoser before losing to Kaori Matsumoto in the semi-final. She then beat Hedvig Karakas in her bronze medal match.

At the 2016 Olympics, Pavia beat Nekoda Smythe-Davis, before losing to Matsumoto again. In the repechage, she lost to Telma Monteiro.

== Personal life ==
She married judoka Ashley McKenzie.
