= Wang Hui (judoka) =

Chinese judoka

Personal information
- Born: 7 July 1984 (age 41) Binzhou, China
- Occupation: Judoka

Sport
- Country: China
- Sport: Judo
- Weight class: –57 kg

Achievements and titles
- Olympic Games: R32 (2012)
- World Champ.: R16 (2010)
- Asian Champ.: 5th (2012)
Medal record
Women's judo
Representing China
IJF Grand Prix
Silver medal – second place	2011 Baku	–57 kg

Profile at external databases
- IJF: 2961
- JudoInside.com: 45168
- Updated on 2 January 2023

Wang Hui (Chinese: 王辉; pinyin: Wáng Huī, born 7 July 1984) is a Chinese judoka. She competed in the Women's 57 kg event at the 2012 Summer Olympics.
