= Ruşana Nurjawowa =

Turkmenistan judoka

Rushana Nurjavova (born 22 June 1994) is a Turkmen judoka. She competed at the 2016 Summer Olympics in the women's 57 kg event, in which she was eliminated in the first round by Hedvig Karakas.
