= Hedvig Karakas =

Hungarian judoka (born 1990)

Personal information
- Nationality: Hungarian
- Born: 21 February 1990 (age 36) Szolnok, Hungary
- Occupation: Judoka

Sport
- Country: Hungary
- Sport: Judo
- Weight class: –57 kg

Achievements and titles
- Olympic Games: 5th (2012)
- World Champ.: (bronze) (2009)
- European Champ.: (gold) (2020)
Medal record
Women's judo
Representing Hungary
World Championships
Bronze medal – third place	2009 Rotterdam	‍–‍57 kg
European Games
Silver medal – second place	2015 Baku	‍–‍57 kg
European Championships
Gold medal – first place	2020 Prague	‍–‍57 kg
Bronze medal – third place	2009 Tbilisi	‍–‍57 kg
Bronze medal – third place	2010 Vienna	‍–‍57 kg
World Masters
Bronze medal – third place	2010 Suwon	‍–‍57 kg
Bronze medal – third place	2016 Guadalajara	‍–‍57 kg
IJF Grand Slam
Silver medal – second place	2009 Moscow	‍–‍57 kg
Silver medal – second place	2018 Düsseldorf	‍–‍57 kg
Bronze medal – third place	2010 Paris	‍–‍57 kg
Bronze medal – third place	2015 Tokyo	‍–‍57 kg
Bronze medal – third place	2019 Baku	‍–‍57 kg
Bronze medal – third place	2020 Budapest	‍–‍57 kg
Bronze medal – third place	2021 Tel Aviv	‍–‍57 kg
IJF Grand Prix
Gold medal – first place	2014 Astana	‍–‍57 kg
Gold medal – first place	2019 Tashkent	‍–‍57 kg
Silver medal – second place	2013 Miami	‍–‍57 kg
Silver medal – second place	2014 Zagreb	‍–‍57 kg
Silver medal – second place	2016 Havana	‍–‍57 kg
Bronze medal – third place	2009 Tunis	‍–‍57 kg
Bronze medal – third place	2011 Baku	‍–‍57 kg
Bronze medal – third place	2014 Samsun	‍–‍57 kg
Bronze medal – third place	2014 Havana	‍–‍57 kg
Bronze medal – third place	2014 Budapest	‍–‍57 kg
Bronze medal – third place	2015 Düsseldorf	‍–‍57 kg
Bronze medal – third place	2016 Tbilisi	‍–‍57 kg
Bronze medal – third place	2017 Zagreb	‍–‍57 kg
Bronze medal – third place	2018 Zagreb	‍–‍57 kg
Bronze medal – third place	2018 Budapest	‍–‍57 kg
Bronze medal – third place	2019 Marrakesh	‍–‍57 kg
Bronze medal – third place	2019 Budapest	‍–‍57 kg
Bronze medal – third place	2020 Tel Aviv	‍–‍57 kg
World Juniors Championships
Gold medal – first place	2009 Paris	‍–‍57 kg
European Junior Championships
Gold medal – first place	2009 Yerevan	‍–‍57 kg
Silver medal – second place	2007 Prague	‍–‍57 kg
Silver medal – second place	2008 Warsaw	‍–‍57 kg
Bronze medal – third place	2005 Zagreb	‍–‍52 kg
European Cadet Championships
Gold medal – first place	2005 Salzburg	‍–‍52 kg
Gold medal – first place	2006 Miskolc	‍–‍52 kg

Profile at external databases
- IJF: 250
- JudoInside.com: 35943
- Updated on 21 May 2023

Hedvig Karakas (born 21 February 1990) is a Hungarian judoka. She is a World Championship bronze medalist, and multi-time European medalist (silver in 2015, and bronze in 2009 and 2010). She competed in the women's 57 kg event at the 2012 and 2016 Summer Olympics. She also competed in the women's 57 kg event at the 2020 Summer Olympics held in Tokyo, Japan.

In 2009, she won bronze at the World Championships, and the gold medal at the World Junior Championships.

At the 2012 Summer Olympics, she beat Concepción Bellorín by uchi-mata, then beat future Olympic gold medalist Rafaela Silva, before losing to Corina Căprioriu. Because Căprioriu reached the final, Karakas was entered into the repechage. There she beat Irina Zabludina but lost her bronze medal match to Automne Pavia. At the 2016 Olympics, Karakas beat Rushana Nurjavova and Catherine Beauchemin-Pinard before losing to Rafaela Silva. As Silva reached the final, Karakas was entered into the repechage, where she lost to Lien Chen-ling.

Awards
Preceded by Katinka Hosszú	Hungarian Sportswoman of The Year; 2020	Succeeded by Incumbent
