= Aliuska Ojeda =

Cuban judoka (born 1992)

Personal information
- Born: 25 March 1992 (age 34)
- Occupation: Judoka

Sport
- Country: Cuba
- Sport: Judo
- Weight class: –57 kg

Achievements and titles
- World Champ.: R16 (2014)
- Pan American Champ.: (2014, 2017)
Medal record
Women's judo
Representing Cuba
Pan American Games
Bronze medal – third place	2015 Toronto	–57 kg
Pan American Championships
Bronze medal – third place	2014 Guayaquil	–57 kg
Bronze medal – third place	2017 Panama City	–57 kg
IJF Grand Prix
Bronze medal – third place	2014 Havana	–57 kg

Profile at external databases
- IJF: 11796
- JudoInside.com: 71903
- Updated on 26 December 2022

Aliuska Ojeda (born 25 March 1992) is a Cuban judoka who has won medals in the 2015 Pan American Games and the Pan American Judo Championships in 2014 and 2017.

== Medals ==
Pan American Games
Year	Location	Medal	Category	Source
2015	Toronto (Canada)	Bronze	–57 kg	
Pan American Judo Championships
Year	Location	Medals	Category	Source
2014	Guayaquil (Ecuador)	Bronze	–57 kg	
2017	Panama City (Panama)	Bronze	–57 kg	
