= Marti Malloy =

American judoka

Personal information
- Full name: Martilou Malloy
- Nationality: American
- Born: June 23, 1986 (age 40) Oak Harbor, Washington, U.S.
- Occupation: Judoka
- Website: MartiMalloy.com

Sport
- Country: United States
- Sport: Judo
- Weight class: –57 kg

Achievements and titles
- Olympic Games: (bronze) (2012)
- World Champ.: (silver) (2013)
- Pan American Champ.: (2014, 2015, 2016)
Medal record
Women's judo
Representing United States
Olympic Games
Bronze medal – third place	2012 London	‍–‍57 kg
World Championships
Silver medal – second place	2013 Rio de Janeiro	‍–‍57 kg
Pan American Games
Gold medal – first place	2015 Toronto	‍–‍57 kg
Pan American Championships
Gold medal – first place	2014 Guayaquil	‍–‍57 kg
Gold medal – first place	2015 Edmonton	‍–‍57 kg
Gold medal – first place	2016 Havana	‍–‍57 kg
Silver medal – second place	2010 San Salvador	‍–‍57 kg
Silver medal – second place	2011 Guadalajara	‍–‍57 kg
Silver medal – second place	2013 San José	‍–‍57 kg
Bronze medal – third place	2017 Panama City	‍–‍57 kg
IJF Grand Slam
Silver medal – second place	2013 Tokyo	‍–‍57 kg
Silver medal – second place	2014 Tyumen	‍–‍57 kg
Bronze medal – third place	2012 Paris	‍–‍57 kg
Bronze medal – third place	2016 Paris	‍–‍57 kg
IJF Grand Prix
Gold medal – first place	2013 Miami	‍–‍57 kg
Gold medal – first place	2016 Havana	‍–‍57 kg
Gold medal – first place	2017 Cancún	‍–‍57 kg
Silver medal – second place	2015 Zagreb	‍–‍57 kg
Bronze medal – third place	2015 Budapest	‍–‍57 kg
Bronze medal – third place	2016 Budapest	‍–‍57 kg

Profile at external databases
- IJF: 51
- JudoInside.com: 26477
- Updated on May 28, 2023

Martilou "Marti" Malloy (born June 23, 1986 in Oak Harbor, Washington) is a female judoka from the United States.

== Career ==
Marti Malloy first made a name for herself in the senior rankings as a 16-year-old when she claimed a gold medal in her first senior international competition the 2002 Rendez-Vous Canada where she defeated a tough field, including both a 2000 Olympian and the previous year's U.S. National Champion, as well as top athletes from Canada and Great Britain.

After high school, she relocated to San Jose State University where she balanced training for the 2012 Olympic Games while pursuing a degree in Advertising/Marketing. She eventually graduated from SJSU in 2010.

In 2005, she continued her success at both the junior and senior levels, winning a silver medal at the Judo U.S. Open and becoming the only U.S. athlete to win gold at the Junior Pan American Championships.

In 2007, she moved up from 57 kg to 63 kg where she placed ninth at the World Championships. Although she competed at the 2007 Pan American Games as a 63 kg player, she moved back down to 57 kg that year to win her first Senior National title in that division.

In 2009, she added a second Senior National title and won the World Team Trials to compete on her second Senior World Team.

In 2010, she won her first big international medal at the Pan American Judo Championships and defended her Senior National title from previous year.

In 2012, she won bronze at the 2012 Summer Olympics in the class -57 kg, scoring an ippon in her last match with a kouchi gari. On her way to winning her bronze medal she beat Telma Monteiro in her first match, then Yadinys Amaris and Irina Zabludina in the quarterfinal, before losing to Corina Caprioriu in the semifinal. In the repechage she beat Giulia Quintavalle to win the bronze medal.

In 2013, she won a silver medal at the World Judo Championships in Rio de Janeiro and a silver medal at the 2013 Tokyo Grand Slam.

In 2014, she won her first gold medal at the Pan American Judo Championships held in Miami. She also defeated the 2012 Olympic champion Kaori Matsumoto at the 2014 World Judo Championships by armbar, but did not place in the tournament.

== Achievements ==
Year	Tournament	Place	Weight class
2007	Pan American Games	5th	Half-Middleweight (- 63 kg)
2007	World Judo Championships	9th	Half-Middleweight (- 63 kg)
2009	World Judo Championships	AC	Lightweight (- 57 kg)
2010	Pan American Judo Championships	2nd	Lightweight (- 57 kg)
2011	Pan American Judo Championships	2nd	Lightweight (- 57 kg)
2012	Grand Slam Paris	3rd	Lightweight (- 57 kg)
2012	2012 Summer Olympics	3rd	Lightweight (- 57 kg)
2013	World Judo Championships	2nd	Lightweight (- 57 kg)
2013	Grand Slam Tokyo	2nd	Lightweight (- 57 kg)
2014	Pan American Judo Championships	1st	Lightweight (- 57 kg)
