= Diana Villavicencio =

Ecuadorian judoka (born 1985)

Personal information
- Born: 10 November 1985 (age 40) Quevedo, Los Ríos, Ecuador

Sport
- Sport: Judo
Medal record
Representing Ecuador
Pan American Games
| Bronze medal – third place | 2007 Rio de Janeiro | 57 kg |
Pan American Judo Championships
| Bronze medal – third place | 2009 Buenos Aires | 57 kg |
South American Games
| Silver medal – second place | 2002 Rio de Janeiro | 57 kg |
| Silver medal – second place | 2006 Buenos Aires | 57 kg |
| Bronze medal – third place | 2010 Medellin | 57 kg |

Diana Johanna Villavicencio Rivera (born November 10, 1985) is a judoka from Ecuador.

== Bio ==
Villavicencio was born in Quevedo but she lives in capital city of Ecuador Quito.

When she was 13 her father Colón took her in gymnasium because her older sister Silvia Villavicencio was that time judo champion of Ecuador. First years she was forced to train judo but later due to trainer Daniel Calderón she has enjoyed it. Judo taught her perseverance and discipline.

She trains almost every day at least 2 hours (before tournament 3h) under Iván Carcañán and Cuban Olympic champion Rafael Carbonell. She is 165 cm tall and she has sometimes problem with weight. She often must cut weight to qualify for the lightweight class.

Villavicencio studied jurisprudence at Universidad Nacional de Loja in 2010.

== Achievements ==
| Year | Tournament | Place | Weight class |
|---|---|---|---|
| 2001 | Bolivarian Games | 3rd | Half Lightweight (-52 kg) |
| 2002 | South American Games | 2nd | Lightweight (- 57 kg) |
| 2005 | Pan American Judo Championships | 3rd | Lightweight (- 57 kg) |
| 2005 | Bolivarian Games | 2nd | Lightweight (- 57 kg) |
| 2006 | Pan American Judo Championships | 3rd | Lightweight (- 57 kg) |
| 2006 | South American Games | 2nd | Lightweight (- 57 kg) |
| 2007 | Pan American Games | 3rd | Lightweight (- 57 kg) |
| 2009 | Pan American Judo Championships | 3rd | Lightweight (- 57 kg) |
| 2010 | South American Games | 3rd | Lightweight (- 57 kg) |
| 2010 | Pan American Judo Championships | 5th | Lightweight (- 57 kg) |
