= Rafaela Silva =

Brazilian judoka (born 1992)

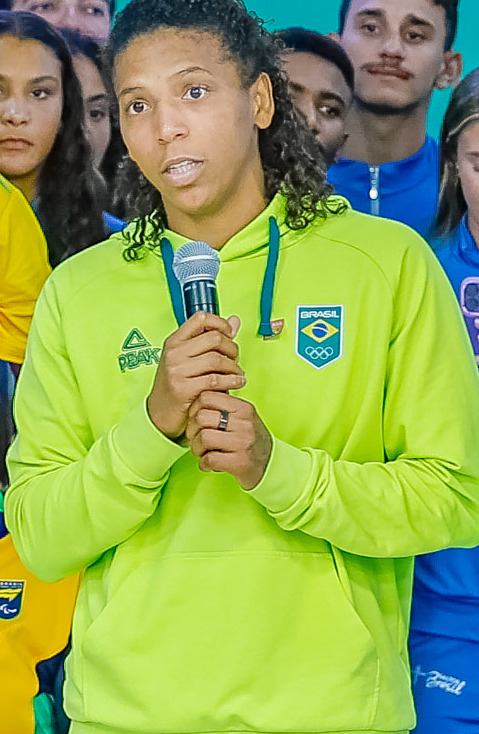
- Silva in July 2024

Personal information
- Full name: Rafaela Lopes Silva
- Born: 24 April 1992 (age 34) Rio de Janeiro, RJ, Brazil
- Occupation: Judoka
- Height: 169 cm (5 ft 7 in)

Sport
- Country: Brazil
- Sport: Judo
- Weight class: ‍–‍57 kg, ‍–‍63 kg
- Club: Instituto Reação
- Coached by: Geraldo Bernardes

Achievements and titles
- Olympic Games: (gold) (2016)
- World Champ.: (gold) (2013, 2022)
- Pan American Champ.: (gold) (2012, 2013, 2024)
Medal record
Women's judo
Representing Brazil
Olympic Games
Gold medal – first place	2016 Rio de Janeiro	‍–‍57 kg
Bronze medal – third place	2024 Paris	Mixed team
World Championships
Gold medal – first place	2013 Rio de Janeiro	‍–‍57 kg
Gold medal – first place	2022 Tashkent	‍–‍57 kg
Silver medal – second place	2011 Paris	‍–‍57 kg
Silver medal – second place	2013 Rio de Janeiro	Women's team
Silver medal – second place	2017 Budapest	Mixed team
Bronze medal – third place	2019 Tokyo	‍–‍57 kg
Bronze medal – third place	2019 Tokyo	Mixed team
Pan American Games
Gold medal – first place	2023 Santiago	‍–‍57 kg
Silver medal – second place	2011 Guadalajara	‍–‍57 kg
Silver medal – second place	2023 Santiago	Mixed team
Bronze medal – third place	2015 Toronto	‍–‍57 kg
Disqualified	2019 Lima	‍–‍57 kg
Pan American Championships
Gold medal – first place	2012 Montreal	‍–‍57 kg
Gold medal – first place	2013 San José	‍–‍57 kg
Gold medal – first place	2024 Rio de Janeiro	‍–‍57 kg
Silver medal – second place	2014 Guayaquil	‍–‍57 kg
Silver medal – second place	2015 Edmonton	‍–‍57 kg
Silver medal – second place	2019 Lima	‍–‍57 kg
Silver medal – second place	2023 Calgary	‍–‍57 kg
Silver medal – second place	2026 Panama City	‍–‍63 kg
Bronze medal – third place	2011 Guadalajara	‍–‍57 kg
Bronze medal – third place	2016 Havana	‍–‍57 kg
Bronze medal – third place	2022 Lima	‍–‍57 kg
Bronze medal – third place	2025 Santiago	‍–‍63 kg
World Masters
Bronze medal – third place	2012 Almaty	‍–‍57 kg
IJF Grand Slam
Gold medal – first place	2019 Baku	‍–‍57 kg
Gold medal – first place	2023 Antalya	‍–‍57 kg
Gold medal – first place	2026 Paris	‍–‍63 kg
Silver medal – second place	2011 Rio de Janeiro	‍–‍57 kg
Silver medal – second place	2017 Abu Dhabi	‍–‍57 kg
Silver medal – second place	2019 Düsseldorf	‍–‍57 kg
Silver medal – second place	2022 Budapest	‍–‍57 kg
Silver medal – second place	2024 Astana	‍–‍57 kg
Bronze medal – third place	2009 Rio de Janeiro	‍–‍57 kg
Bronze medal – third place	2011 Tokyo	‍–‍57 kg
Bronze medal – third place	2012 Tokyo	‍–‍63 kg
Bronze medal – third place	2013 Moscow	‍–‍57 kg
Bronze medal – third place	2014 Paris	‍–‍57 kg
Bronze medal – third place	2014 Tokyo	‍–‍57 kg
Bronze medal – third place	2016 Paris	‍–‍57 kg
Bronze medal – third place	2017 Ekaterinburg	‍–‍57 kg
Bronze medal – third place	2019 Brasilia	‍–‍57 kg
Bronze medal – third place	2022 Tbilisi	‍–‍57 kg
Bronze medal – third place	2024 Tbilisi	‍–‍57 kg
Bronze medal – third place	2025 Astana	‍–‍63 kg
Bronze medal – third place	2025 Abu Dhabi	‍–‍63 kg
Bronze medal – third place	2026 Astana	‍–‍63 kg
IJF Grand Prix
Gold medal – first place	2011 Düsseldorf	‍–‍57 kg
Gold medal – first place	2015 Düsseldorf	‍–‍57 kg
Gold medal – first place	2016 Tbilisi	‍–‍57 kg
Gold medal – first place	2018 Budapest	‍–‍57 kg
Gold medal – first place	2018 Cancún	‍–‍57 kg
Gold medal – first place	2019 Budapest	‍–‍57 kg
Gold medal – first place	2022 Almada	‍–‍57 kg
Gold medal – first place	2026 Linz	‍–‍63 kg
Silver medal – second place	2013 Qingdao	‍–‍57 kg
Silver medal – second place	2017 Tbilisi	‍–‍57 kg
Silver medal – second place	2019 Tbilisi	‍–‍57 kg
Silver medal – second place	2023 Almada	‍–‍57 kg
Bronze medal – third place	2012 Düsseldorf	‍–‍57 kg
Bronze medal – third place	2016 Havana	‍–‍57 kg
Bronze medal – third place	2025 Guadalajara	‍–‍63 kg
World Juniors Championships
Gold medal – first place	2008 Bangkok	‍–‍57 kg
Military World Games
Gold medal – first place	2015 Mungyeong	‍–‍57 kg
Gold medal – first place	2015 Mungyeong	Women's team

Profile at external databases
- IJF: 438
- JudoInside.com: 51417
- Updated on 10 May 2026

Rafaela Lopes Silva (born 24 April 1992) is a Brazilian judoka. She won gold medals at the World Judo Championships of 2013 and 2022 and at the 2016 Summer Olympics in the –57 kg weight division. Currently, she occupies the rank of graduation third sergeant in the Navy of Brazil and integrates the Center of Physical Education Admiral Nunes (CEFAN), the Military Sports Department.

In August 2013, she was the first Brazilian woman to become a world champion in Judo.

== Biography ==
Rafaela Silva grew up in the Rio de Janeiro slum known as Cidade de Deus. The first sport she liked was football, practicing against other children in a dirt field near her home in Jacarepagua. Because they were concerned about fights and violence in the streets, when Rafaela was 7 years old her parents Luiz Carlos and Zenilda Silva signed her up, together with her sister, Raquel, for judo classes at the Institute Reaction, newly established at Cidade de Deus by the former athlete Flávio Canto.

"I started judo in 2000, early in the project. My father put me in the sport as an alternative to fighting in the street. In Judo, I found discipline, I respect the other and began to take the sport seriously. Judo showed me the world. With the resources I get, I guarantee my support and help my family pay the bills. "

== Judo career ==
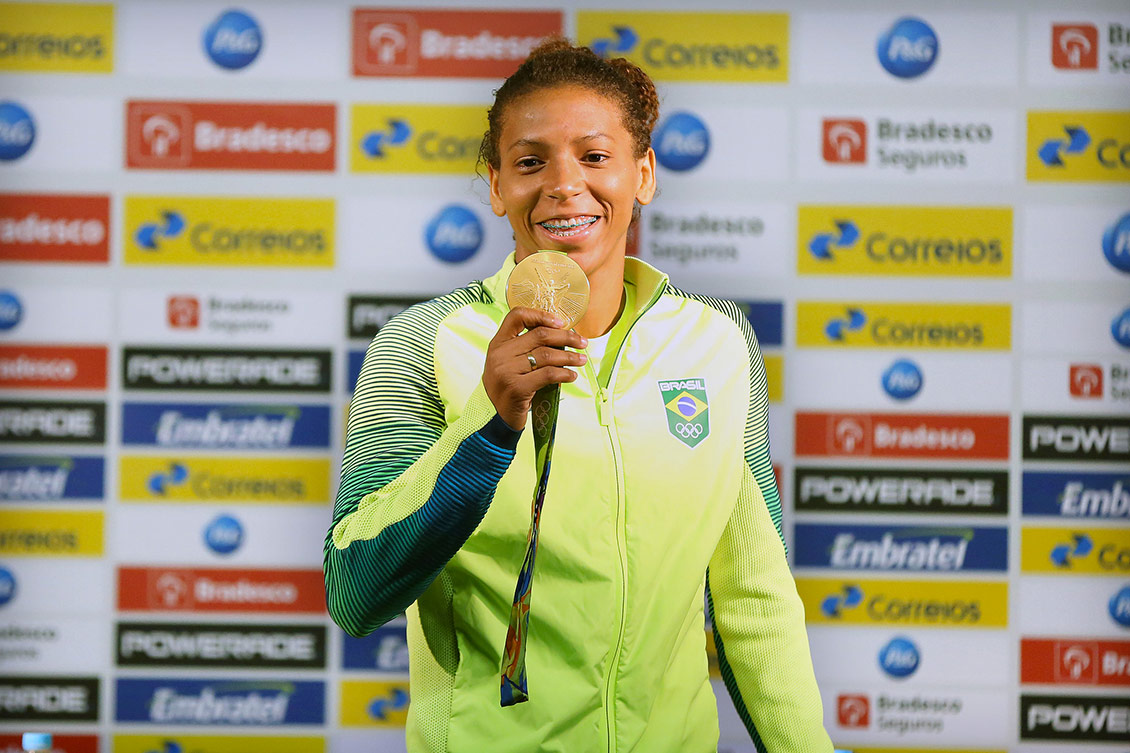
Rafaela Silva, with her gold medal at the Summer Olympic Games 2016 in Rio de Janeiro.

Silva won her first major medal by claiming silver at the 2011 World Judo Championships in Paris.

At the 2012 London Olympics, Silva was disqualified for an illegal leg grab during a fight against Hedvig Karakas of Hungary. Upon returning home, she became depressed. In December 2012, she was a bronze medalist at the Judo Grand Slam Tokyo (category up to 63 kg).

During the 2013 World Judo Championships in Rio de Janeiro, Silva became the first woman to win a gold medal for Brazil in a World Judo Championship after defeating American Marti Malloy in the final. She repeated the feat at the 2016 Summer Olympics by defeating Mongolian Sumiya Dorjsuren in the final.

Silva won gold and bronze in 2019 Pan American Games and 2019 Judo World Championships, respectively, but tested positive for fenoterol after the former tournament. Despite testing negative in the World Championships, she was banned from competition for two years by IJF and stripped of both medals. Silva appealed the sanction, but the CAS upheld the ban in late 2020.

She began her comeback in 2022. That year, she won World Championship gold in Tashkent, defeating Haruka Funakubo with a waza-ari.

She beat Christa Deguchi to win the 2024 Pan American Championships.

She won silver in the -63 kg division at the 2026 Pan American Championships, losing to Jessica Klimkait in the golden score period.

As of November 2026, she has won 22 medals at Judo Grand Slam events.

== Personal life ==
In an interview with Globo Esporte, Rafaela came out as lesbian. She spoke about her girlfriend Thamara Cezar, whom she met via judo.

Awards
Preceded by Ana Marcela Cunha	Brazilian Sportswomen of the Year; 2016	Succeeded by Mayra Aguiar
Preceded by Thiago Pereira	Brazilian Athlete of the Year (Fan's Choice); 2016	Succeeded by Caio Bonfim
