= Miryam Roper =

German–Panamian judoka (born 1982)

Personal information
- Born: 26 June 1982 (age 44) Aachen, West Germany
- Occupation: Judoka

Sport
- Country: Germany (2009–16); Panama (2017–present)
- Sport: Judo
- Weight class: ‍–‍57 kg

Achievements and titles
- Olympic Games: R32 (2012, 2016, 2020)
- World Champ.: (bronze) (2013)
- Regional finals: (silver) (2014); (gold) (2020)
Medal record
Women's judo
Representing Germany
World Championships
Bronze medal – third place	2013 Rio de Janeiro	‍–‍57 kg
European Games
Silver medal – second place	2015 Baku	Women's team
Bronze medal – third place	2015 Baku	‍–‍57 kg
European Championships
Silver medal – second place	2014 Montpellier	‍–‍57 kg
Bronze medal – third place	2012 Chelyabinsk	‍–‍57 kg
IJF Grand Slam
Gold medal – first place	2013 Baku	‍–‍57 kg
Gold medal – first place	2013 Moscow	‍–‍57 kg
Bronze medal – third place	2015 Baku	‍–‍57 kg
IJF Grand Prix
Gold medal – first place	2013 Rijeka	‍–‍57 kg
Gold medal – first place	2013 Abu Dhabi	‍–‍57 kg
Gold medal – first place	2014 Qingdao	‍–‍57 kg
Silver medal – second place	2014 Samsun	‍–‍57 kg
Silver medal – second place	2015 Qingdao	‍–‍57 kg
Bronze medal – third place	2010 Tunis	‍–‍57 kg
Bronze medal – third place	2013 Miami	‍–‍57 kg
Bronze medal – third place	2015 Tbilisi	‍–‍57 kg
Bronze medal – third place	2016 Tbilisi	‍–‍57 kg
Bronze medal – third place	2016 Samsun	‍–‍57 kg
Representing Panama
Pan American Games
Bronze medal – third place	2019 Lima	‍–‍57 kg
Pan American Championships
Gold medal – first place	2020 Guadalajara	‍–‍57 kg
Bronze medal – third place	2018 San José	‍–‍57 kg
IJF Grand Slam
Gold medal – first place	2017 Ekaterinburg	‍–‍57 kg
IJF Grand Prix
Silver medal – second place	2017 Cancún	‍–‍57 kg
Bronze medal – third place	2018 Tunis	‍–‍57 kg
Bronze medal – third place	2018 Agadir	‍–‍57 kg
Bronze medal – third place	2018 Cancún	‍–‍57 kg
Bronze medal – third place	2018 The Hague	‍–‍57 kg

Profile at external databases
- IJF: 38528, 1794
- JudoInside.com: 15886
- Updated on 10 July 2023

Miryam Roper (born 26 June 1982) is a German-born Panamanian judoka. She competed in the Women's 57 kg event at the 2012 Summer Olympics. Since 2017, Roper competes for her father's land Panama. She also competed in the women's 57 kg event at the 2020 Summer Olympics held in Tokyo, Japan.
