= Concepción Bellorín =

Spanish judoka

Personal information
- Born: 4 November 1980 (age 45) Badajoz, Spain
- Occupation: Judoka

Sport
- Country: Spain
- Sport: Judo
- Weight class: –57 kg

Achievements and titles
- Olympic Games: R32 (2012)
- World Champ.: R16 (2009, 2010)
- European Champ.: 7th (2010)
Medal record
Women's judo
Representing Spain
World Masters
Bronze medal – third place	2011 Baku	–57 kg
IJF Grand Prix
Bronze medal – third place	2009 Abu Dhabi	–57 kg

Profile at external databases
- IJF: 465
- JudoInside.com: 28482
- Updated on 20 November 2022

Concepción Bellorín (born 4 November 1980) is a Spanish judoka. She competed in the Women's 57 kg event at the 2012 Summer Olympics.
