= Kaori Matsumoto =

Japanese judoka (born 1987)

Personal information
- Nationality: Japanese
- Born: 11 September 1987 (age 39)
- Occupation: Judoka
- Website: darcys-factory.co.jp

Sport
- Country: Japan
- Sport: Judo
- Weight class: –57 kg

Achievements and titles
- Olympic Games: (gold) (2012)
- World Champ.: (gold) (2010, 2015)
- Asian Champ.: (gold) (2008, 2010)
Medal record
Women's judo
Representing Japan
Olympic Games
Gold medal – first place	2012 London	‍–‍57 kg
Bronze medal – third place	2016 Rio de Janeiro	‍–‍57 kg
World Championships
Gold medal – first place	2010 Tokyo	‍–‍57 kg
Gold medal – first place	2015 Astana	‍–‍57 kg
Bronze medal – third place	2011 Paris	‍–‍57 kg
Asian Games
Gold medal – first place	2010 Guangzhou	‍–‍57 kg
Asian Championships
Gold medal – first place	2008 Jeju	‍–‍57 kg
World Masters
Gold medal – first place	2010 Suwon	‍–‍57 kg
Gold medal – first place	2012 Almaty	‍–‍57 kg
Silver medal – second place	2011 Baku	‍–‍57 kg
IJF Grand Slam
Gold medal – first place	2008 Tokyo	‍–‍57 kg
Gold medal – first place	2009 Moscow	‍–‍57 kg
Gold medal – first place	2010 Paris	‍–‍57 kg
Gold medal – first place	2010 Rio de Janeiro	‍–‍57 kg
Gold medal – first place	2010 Tokyo	‍–‍57 kg
Gold medal – first place	2011 Tokyo	‍–‍57 kg
Gold medal – first place	2014 Tokyo	‍–‍57 kg
Silver medal – second place	2009 Tokyo	‍–‍57 kg
Bronze medal – third place	2009 Paris	‍–‍57 kg
IJF Grand Prix
Gold medal – first place	2010 Düsseldorf	‍–‍57 kg
Gold medal – first place	2012 Düsseldorf	‍–‍57 kg
Gold medal – first place	2014 Düsseldorf	‍–‍57 kg
Gold medal – first place	2014 Budapest	‍–‍57 kg
Gold medal – first place	2016 Düsseldorf	‍–‍57 kg
Silver medal – second place	2011 Düsseldorf	‍–‍57 kg
Bronze medal – third place	2009 Hamburg	‍–‍57 kg
Bronze medal – third place	2015 Ulaanbaatar	‍–‍57 kg

Profile at external databases
- IJF: 79
- JudoInside.com: 37162
- Updated on 24 May 2023

Kaori Matsumoto (松本 薫, Matsumoto Kaori; born 11 September 1987 in Kanazawa) is a retired Japanese judoka.

== Career ==
Kaori Matsumoto started Judo at the age of 6. Iwai Judo Juku, the school she attended, also worked on wrestling once a week. Therefore, she brought a stance of leaning forward, similar to that of wrestling, to judo. As an elementary school student, she won medals at national wrestling competitions. In judo, she won her first national tournament in her senior year of junior high school.

Her favorite techniques are Kosoto gari, Sode tsurikomi goshi and Newaza. She broke her right shoulder during high school, her nasal bone and right elbow during college, and her right hand during the 2009 world championship due to an unbalanced diet and finished fifth. After those events, she began to control her eating habits and learned the importance of food education. She then won the International Conventions championship 7 times in a row, from the World Masters of January 2010 to the Grand Slam Tokyo of December 2010.

She won the gold medal in the lightweight (57 kg) division at the 2010 World Judo Championships. In August 2011, she finished third at the World Championships in Paris. In December, she won the gold medal at the Grand Slam Tokyo.

In 2012, Kaori won gold medals at the Masters in January and at the Düsseldorf Grand Prix in February. The same year, Kaori Matsumoto won gold at the 2012 Summer Olympics over Romanian Corina Căprioriu after the latter was disqualified during the golden score period in the women's -57 kg final, winning Japan's first gold medal of the 2012 games and their only gold in the Judo event.

After 2012 Summer Olympics, she started to do volunteer work for kids in Japan. Kaori Matsumoto voiced a motorcycle policewoman modeled after her in the 2013 movie Dragon Ball Z: Battle of Gods.

On 26 August 2015 she won the gold medal in the under 57 kg woman's division at the 2015 World Judo Championships in Kazakhstan.

She finished third at the 2016 Olympics.

She retired in 2019.

She is married with two children.
