= Irina Zabludina =

Russian judoka (born 1987)

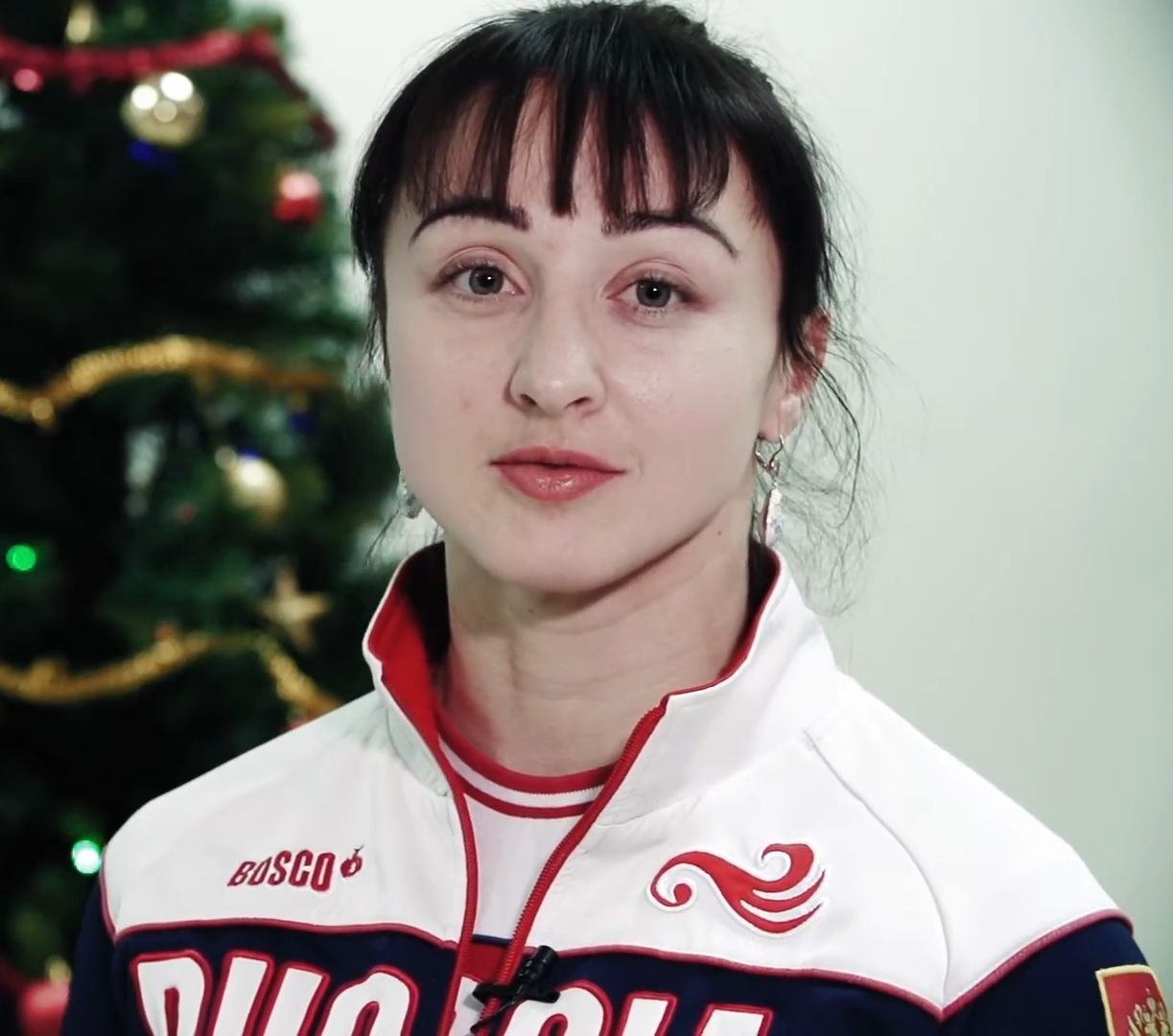

Personal information
- Born: 24 February 1987 (age 39) Krasnodar Krai, Russian SFSR, Soviet Union
- Occupation: Judoka

Sport
- Country: Russia
- Sport: Judo
- Weight class: ‍–‍57 kg

Achievements and titles
- Olympic Games: 7th (2012)
- World Champ.: 7th (2011)
- European Champ.: (bronze) (2011, 2013)
Medal record
Women's judo
Representing Russia
European Championships
Bronze medal – third place	2011 Istanbul	‍–‍57 kg
Bronze medal – third place	2013 Budapest	‍–‍57 kg
IJF Grand Slam
Bronze medal – third place	2011 Moscow	‍–‍57 kg
Bronze medal – third place	2015 Baku	‍–‍57 kg
IJF Grand Prix
Gold medal – first place	2014 Tbilisi	‍–‍57 kg
Gold medal – first place	2017 Tbilisi	‍–‍57 kg
Silver medal – second place	2015 Tashkent	‍–‍57 kg
Bronze medal – third place	2013 Samsun	‍–‍57 kg
Bronze medal – third place	2013 Qingdao	‍–‍57 kg
Bronze medal – third place	2014 Düsseldorf	‍–‍57 kg
European U23 Championships
Bronze medal – third place	2008 Zagreb	‍–‍57 kg
Bronze medal – third place	2009 Antalya	‍–‍57 kg
World Juniors Championships
Gold medal – first place	2006 Santo Domingo	‍–‍57 kg
European Junior Championships
Bronze medal – third place	2005 Zagreb	‍–‍63 kg
Summer Universiade
Bronze medal – third place	2013 Kazan	Women's team

Profile at external databases
- IJF: 367
- JudoInside.com: 32993
- Updated on 14 November 2022

Irina Zabludina (born 24 February 1987) is a Russian judoka. She competed in the Women's 57 kg event at the 2012 Summer Olympics, reaching the quarterfinals before losing to Marti Malloy.
