= Telma Monteiro =

Portuguese judoka (born 1985)

OM Telma Monteiro
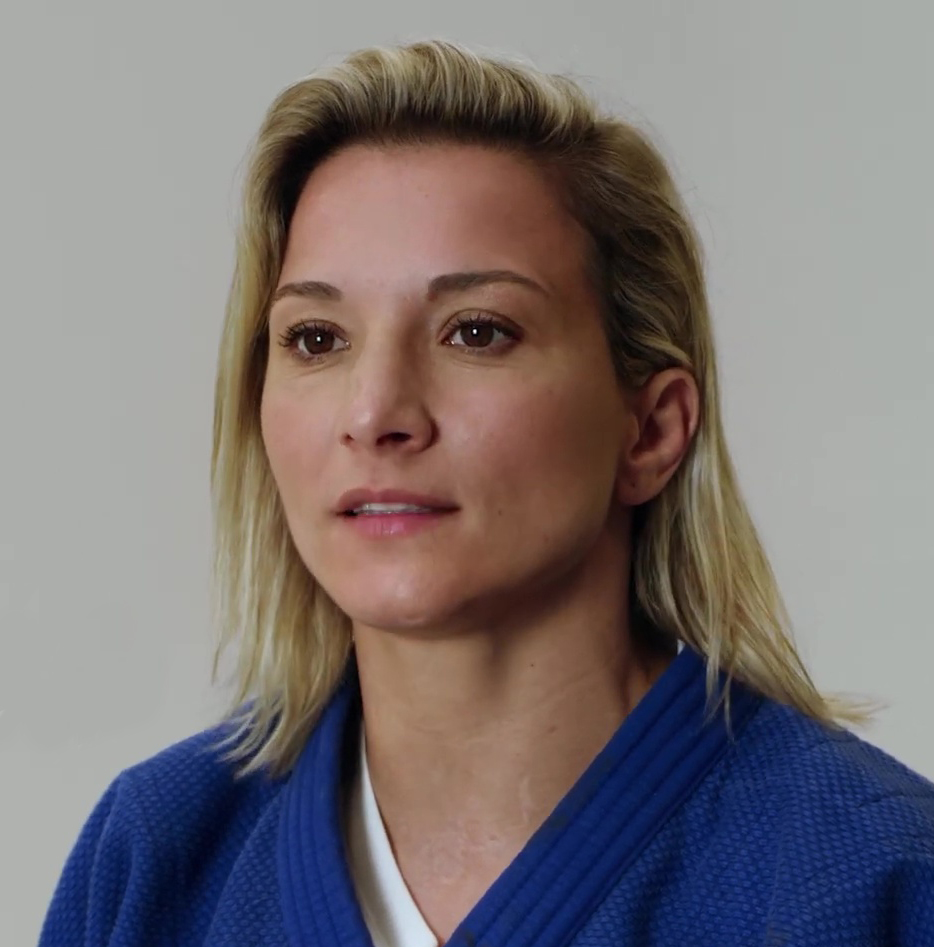
- Monteiro in 2021

Personal information
- Full name: Telma Alexandra Pinto Monteiro
- Nationality: Portuguese
- Born: 27 December 1985 (age 40) Lisbon, Portugal
- Occupation: Judoka
- Height: 163 cm (5 ft 4 in)

Sport
- Country: Portugal
- Sport: Judo
- Weight class: ‍–‍52 kg, ‍–‍57 kg
- Club: Benfica
- Retired: December 2024

Achievements and titles
- Olympic Games: (bronze) (2016)
- World Champ.: (silver) (2007, 2009, 2010, 2014)
- European Champ.: (gold) (2006, 2007, 2009, 2012, 2015, 2021)
- Highest world ranking: 1st ‍–‍52 kg (2006); 1st ‍–‍57 kg (2015)
Medal record
Women's judo
Representing Portugal
Olympic Games
Bronze medal – third place	2016 Rio de Janeiro	‍–‍57 kg
World Championships
Silver medal – second place	2007 Rio de Janeiro	‍–‍52 kg
Silver medal – second place	2009 Rotterdam	‍–‍57 kg
Silver medal – second place	2010 Tokyo	‍–‍57 kg
Silver medal – second place	2014 Chelyabinsk	‍–‍57 kg
Bronze medal – third place	2005 Cairo	‍–‍52 kg
European Games
Gold medal – first place	2015 Baku	‍–‍57 kg
Silver medal – second place	2019 Minsk	Mixed team
Bronze medal – third place	2019 Minsk	‍–‍57 kg
European Championships
Gold medal – first place	2006 Tampere	‍–‍52 kg
Gold medal – first place	2007 Belgrade	‍–‍52 kg
Gold medal – first place	2009 Tbilisi	‍–‍57 kg
Gold medal – first place	2012 Chelyabinsk	‍–‍57 kg
Gold medal – first place	2021 Lisbon	‍–‍57 kg
Silver medal – second place	2011 Istanbul	‍–‍57 kg
Silver medal – second place	2020 Prague	‍–‍57 kg
Bronze medal – third place	2004 Bucharest	‍–‍52 kg
Bronze medal – third place	2005 Rotterdam	‍–‍52 kg
Bronze medal – third place	2010 Vienna	‍–‍57 kg
Bronze medal – third place	2013 Budapest	‍–‍57 kg
Bronze medal – third place	2014 Montpellier	‍–‍57 kg
Bronze medal – third place	2018 Tel Aviv	‍–‍57 kg
World Masters
Gold medal – first place	2011 Baku	‍–‍57 kg
Silver medal – second place	2012 Almaty	‍–‍57 kg
Bronze medal – third place	2013 Tyumen	‍–‍57 kg
Bronze medal – third place	2019 Qingdao	‍–‍57 kg
IJF Grand Slam
Gold medal – first place	2009 Rio de Janeiro	‍–‍57 kg
Gold medal – first place	2012 Paris	‍–‍57 kg
Gold medal – first place	2014 Abu Dhabi	‍–‍57 kg
Gold medal – first place	2015 Paris	‍–‍57 kg
Gold medal – first place	2018 Ekaterinburg	‍–‍57 kg
Gold medal – first place	2021 Abu Dhabi	‍–‍57 kg
Silver medal – second place	2010 Rio de Janeiro	‍–‍57 kg
Silver medal – second place	2014 Tokyo	‍–‍57 kg
Silver medal – second place	2022 Baku	‍–‍57 kg
Bronze medal – third place	2009 Moscow	‍–‍57 kg
Bronze medal – third place	2010 Moscow	‍–‍57 kg
Bronze medal – third place	2011 Paris	‍–‍57 kg
IJF Grand Prix
Gold medal – first place	2009 Hamburg	‍–‍57 kg
Silver medal – second place	2010 Düsseldorf	‍–‍57 kg
Silver medal – second place	2013 Rijeka	‍–‍57 kg
Bronze medal – third place	2011 Abu Dhabi	‍–‍57 kg
Bronze medal – third place	2013 Abu Dhabi	‍–‍57 kg
Bronze medal – third place	2014 Ulaanbaatar	‍–‍57 kg
Bronze medal – third place	2016 Budapest	‍–‍57 kg
Bronze medal – third place	2022 Almada	‍–‍57 kg
European U23 Championships
Gold medal – first place	2006 Moscow	‍–‍52 kg
Silver medal – second place	2005 Kyiv	‍–‍52 kg
World Juniors Championships
Bronze medal – third place	2004 Budapest	‍–‍52 kg
European Junior Championships
Gold medal – first place	2004 Sofia	‍–‍52 kg
Bronze medal – third place	2003 Sarajevo	‍–‍52 kg

Profile at external databases
- IJF: 172
- JudoInside.com: 20922
- Updated on 18 December 2024

Telma Alexandra Pinto Monteiro ComM (born 27 December 1985) is a Portuguese retired judoka who has won multiple medals in international competitions, such as the European and World Championships. She is a two-time winner of the Paris Grand Slam, in 2012 and 2015.

At the 2016 Summer Olympics in Rio de Janeiro, Monteiro won an Olympic medal after taking the bronze in the women's ‍–‍57 kg event. She also competed in the women's 57 kg event at the 2020 Summer Olympics held in Tokyo, Japan, where she finished 9th place.

Born in Lisbon, Monteiro represented Construções Norte/Sul until 2007, when she joined S.L. Benfica. In 2025, she opens about a relationship with the Greek judoka, Mina Ricken.

== Achievements ==
=== –57 kg ===
==== 2019 ====
- Bronze – Masters Abu Dhabi
- Bronze – European Games / European Championships (Minsk)

==== 2018 ====
- Gold – Grand Slam Ekaterinburg

==== 2017 ====
- Gold – European Open (Minsk)

==== 2016 ====
- Bronze – Olympic Games (Rio de Janeiro)
- Bronze – Grand Prix (Budapest)

==== 2015 ====
- Gold – European Championships
- Gold – Grand Slam Paris

==== 2014 ====
- Silver – World Championships
- Gold – Grand Slam (Abu Dhabi)
- Silver – Grand Slam Tokyo

==== 2013 ====
- Bronze – European Championships (Budapest)
- Gold – European Open (Sofia)

==== 2012 ====
- 17th – Olympic Games
- Gold – European Championships
- Gold – Grand Slam Paris
- Silver – Masters (Almaty)

==== 2011 ====
- Silver – European Championships
- Gold – European Cup (Hamburg)
- Bronze – World Cup (Lisbon)
- Bronze – Grand Slam Paris
- Bronze – Grand Prix (Abu Dhabi)
- Gold – Masters (Baku)

==== 2010 ====
- Silver – World Championships
- Bronze – European Championships
- Gold – World Cup (Sofia)
- Silver – Grand Prix Düsseldorf
- Silver – Grand Slam Rio de Janeiro
- Bronze – Grand Slam Moscow

==== 2009 ====
- Gold – European Championships
- Silver – World Championships
- Gold – World Cup (Lisbon)
- Gold – World Cup (Sofia)
- Gold – Grand Prix (Hamburg)
- Gold – Grand Slam Rio de Janeiro
- Bronze – Grand Slam Moscow

=== –52 kg ===
==== 2008 ====
- 9th – Olympic Games
- Gold – Portuguese Cup by teams
- Gold – World Cup (Bucharest) A category
- Bronze – World Cup (Paris) Super A category

==== 2007 ====
- Silver – World Championships
- Gold – European Championships
- Gold – World Cup (Lisbon)
- Gold – World Cup (Denmark)
- Silver – Super A Tournament (Paris)
- Silver – Super A Tournament (Moscow)

==== 2006 ====
1st – World Ranking –52 kg

- Gold – European Championships
- Gold – World Cup (Lisbon)
- Silver – Fukuoka International Championships (Fukuoka)
- Gold – Super A Tournament (Moscow)
- Gold – Under-23 European Championships (Moscow)

==== 2005 ====
- Bronze – World Championships
- Bronze – European Championships
- Gold – World Cup (Madrid)
- Bronze – World Cup (Tampere)
- Silver – Under-23 European Championships (Kyiv)
- Gold – Kiyoshi Kobayashi International Championship
- Gold – World Cup (Bucharest)

==== 2004 ====
2nd – European Ranking –52 kg

- 12th – Olympic Games
- Silver – Juniors World Championship (Budapest)
- Gold – Junior European Championship (Sofia)
- Gold – European Open (Germany)
- Gold – World Cup (Leonding)
- Gold – World Cup (Rome)
- Bronze – World Cup (Tallinn)
- Bronze – World Cup (Warsaw)

==== 2003 ====
- Gold – Portuguese Championship
- Bronze – Juniors European Championships (Sarajevo)
- Gold – Juniors A Championship (Sweden)
- Gold – Juniors A Championship (Hungary)
- Gold – Juniors A Championship (Portugal)
- Bronze – Juniors A Championship (Czech Republic)

==== 2002 ====
- 9th – Juniors European Championship
- Gold – Juniors Portuguese Championship
- Silver – Portugal Juniors A Tournament

==== 2001 ====
- Silver – Esperanças Portuguese Championship

== Orders ==
- Officer of the Order of Merit
- Commander of the Order of Merit

Awards
Preceded by Michelle Larcher de Brito; Sara Moreira	Portuguese Sportswoman of the Year; 2010, 2011; 2014	Succeeded by Jéssica Augusto; Ana Filipa Martins
Olympic Games
Preceded by Nelson Évora	Flagbearer for Portugal; London 2012	Succeeded by João Rodrigues
