= Corina Căprioriu =

Romanian judoka (born 1986)

Corina Căprioriu Ștefan
Personal information
- Full name: Corina Oana Ștefan
- Born: Corina Oana Căprioriu; 18 July 1986 (age 39) Lugoj, Romania
- Occupation: Judoka
- Height: 1.60 m (5 ft 3 in)
- Spouse: Gheorghiță Ștefan (m. 2016)

Sport
- Country: Romania
- Sport: Judo
- Weight class: –57 kg
- Club: CSM Cluj-Napoca

Achievements and titles
- Olympic Games: (silver) (2012)
- World Champ.: (silver) (2015)
- European Champ.: (gold) (2010)
Medal record
Women's judo
Representing Romania
Olympic Games
Silver medal – second place	2012 London	‍–‍57 kg
World Championships
Silver medal – second place	2015 Astana	‍–‍57 kg
Bronze medal – third place	2011 Paris	‍–‍57 kg
European Championships
Gold medal – first place	2010 Vienna	‍–‍57 kg
Bronze medal – third place	2011 Istanbul	‍–‍57 kg
World Masters
Bronze medal – third place	2013 Tyumen	‍–‍57 kg
Bronze medal – third place	2015 Rabat	‍–‍57 kg
IJF Grand Slam
Gold medal – first place	2011 Rio de Janeiro	‍–‍57 kg
Gold medal – first place	2012 Moscow	‍–‍57 kg
Gold medal – first place	2015 Baku	‍–‍57 kg
Silver medal – second place	2015 Tyumen	‍–‍57 kg
Bronze medal – third place	2011 Paris	‍–‍57 kg
Bronze medal – third place	2014 Abu Dhabi	‍–‍57 kg
IJF Grand Prix
Gold medal – first place	2013 Qingdao	‍–‍57 kg
Gold medal – first place	2014 Tashkent	‍–‍57 kg
Silver medal – second place	2009 Abu Dhabi	‍–‍57 kg
Silver medal – second place	2013 Abu Dhabi	‍–‍57 kg
Silver medal – second place	2013 Jeju	‍–‍57 kg
Bronze medal – third place	2009 Hamburg	‍–‍57 kg
Bronze medal – third place	2010 Düsseldorf	‍–‍57 kg
Bronze medal – third place	2010 Tunis	‍–‍57 kg
Bronze medal – third place	2010 Abu Dhabi	‍–‍57 kg
Bronze medal – third place	2011 Düsseldorf	‍–‍57 kg
Bronze medal – third place	2014 Samsun	‍–‍57 kg
Bronze medal – third place	2015 Samsun	‍–‍57 kg
European Junior Championships
Silver medal – second place	2004 Sofia	‍–‍57 kg
European Cadet Championships
Bronze medal – third place	2002 Győr	‍–‍57 kg

Profile at external databases
- IJF: 384
- JudoInside.com: 25797
- Updated on 28 May 2023

Corina Căprioriu (Romanian pronunciation: [koˈrina kəpriˈorju]; born 18 July 1986) is a Romanian judoka. She has competed under the name Corina Ștefan since her 2016 marriage to Romanian wrestler Gheorghiță Ștefan.

Căprioriu won the silver medal at the 2012 Summer Olympics. She lost in the final against Japan’s Kaori Matsumoto after being disqualified (hansoku) during the golden score period in the women's ‍–‍57 kg weight class.

Căprioriu also won the bronze medal in the lightweight division at the 2011 World Judo Championships. Caprioriu was European Champion in 2010 and bronze medalist in 2011. She has booked multiple World cup titles since 2010.

Căprioriu managed to qualify in the final at the 2015 World Judo Championships where she met her opponent from the 2012 Summer Olympics, Kaori Matsumoto. She lost after the Japanese scored a waza-ari. She is the current World No.1 at the Women's ‍–‍57 kg category.
