= Yadinis Amarís =

Colombian judoka (born 1984)

Personal information
- Full name: Yadinis Amarís Rocha
- Born: 1 April 1984 (age 42) Aguachica, Colombia
- Occupation: Judoka

Sport
- Country: Colombia
- Sport: Judo
Medal record
Representing Colombia
Women's judo
Pan American Games
Silver medal – second place	2019 Lima	57 kg
Pan American Championships
Bronze medal – third place	2007 Montreal	57 kg
Bronze medal – third place	2015 Edmonton	57 kg
Central American and Caribbean Games
Bronze medal – third place	2006 Cartagena	63 kg
Bronze medal – third place	2006 Cartagena	Team

Profile at external databases
- JudoInside.com: 15920

Yadinis Amarís Rocha (born 1 April 1984) is a Colombian judoka. She competed in the Women's 57 kg event at the 2012 Summer Olympics. Amarís won the bronze medal of the under 63 kg division of the 2006 Central American and Caribbean Games.
