= Sagi Muki =

Israeli judoka (born 1992)

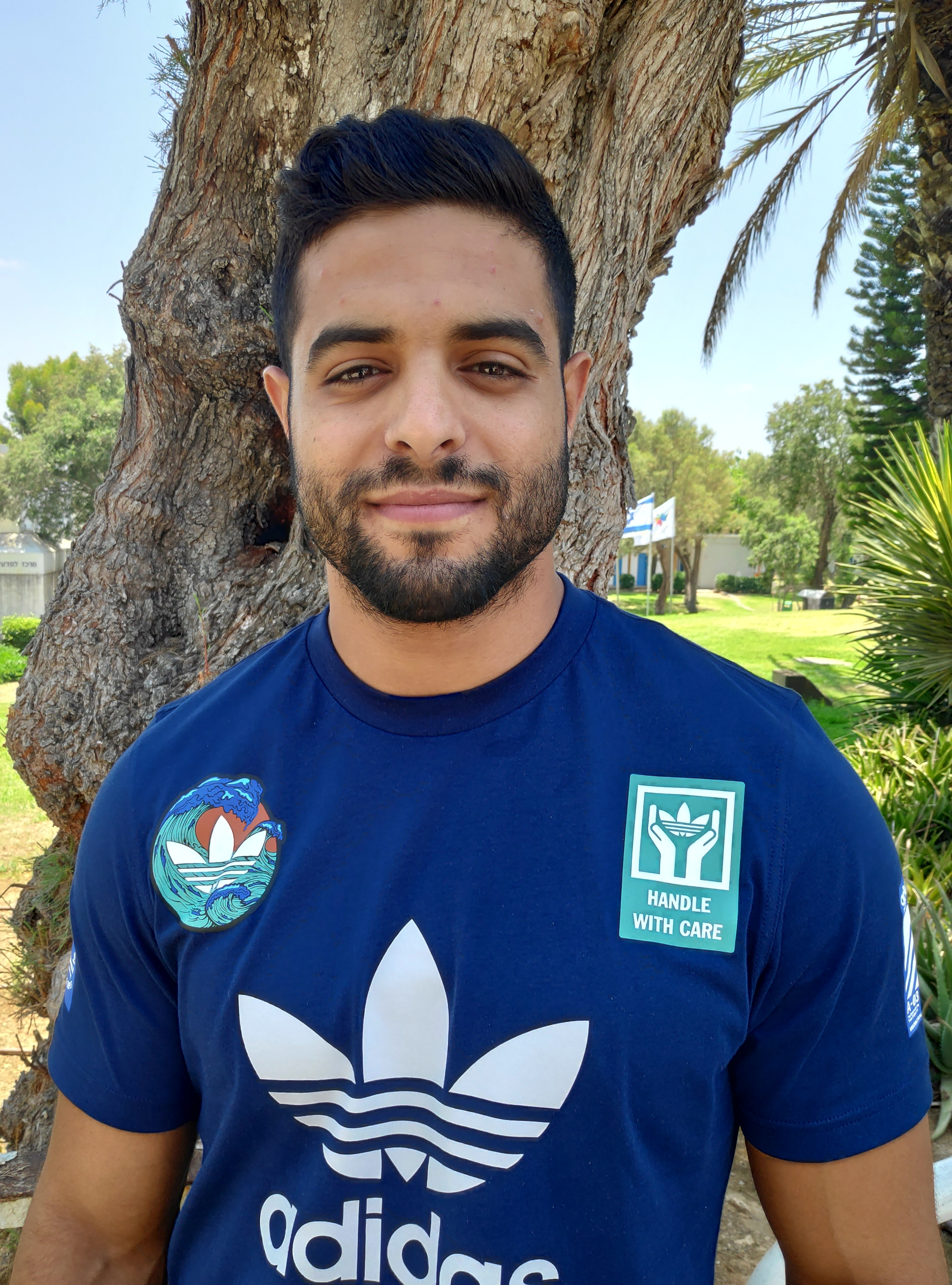
- Muki in 2019

Personal information
- Native name: שגיא מוקי
- Full name: Sagi Aharon Muki
- Born: 17 May 1992 (age 34) Netanya, Israel
- Occupation: Judoka
- Years active: 30
- Height: 180 cm (5 ft 11 in)

Sport
- Country: Israel
- Sport: Judo
- Weight class: –81 kg
- Rank: 5th dan black belt
- Coached by: Oren Smadja
- Retired: 16 February 2026

Achievements and titles
- Olympic Games: 5th (2016)
- World Champ.: (gold) (2019)
- European Champ.: (gold) (2015, 2018)
- Highest world ranking: 1
Medal record
Men's judo
Representing Israel
Olympic Games
Bronze medal – third place	2020 Tokyo	Mixed team
World Championships
Gold medal – first place	2019 Tokyo	‍–‍81 kg
Bronze medal – third place	2022 Tashkent	Mixed team
European Games
Gold medal – first place	2015 Baku	‍–‍73 kg
European Championships
Gold medal – first place	2018 Tel Aviv	‍–‍81 kg
Bronze medal – third place	2021 Lisbon	‍–‍81 kg
World Masters
Silver medal – second place	2019 Qingdao	‍–‍81 kg
Bronze medal – third place	2021 Doha	‍–‍81 kg
IJF Grand Slam
Gold medal – first place	2014 Baku	‍–‍73 kg
Gold medal – first place	2018 Abu Dhabi	‍–‍81 kg
Gold medal – first place	2019 Ekaterinburg	‍–‍81 kg
Gold medal – first place	2019 Baku	‍–‍81 kg
Gold medal – first place	2023 Tel Aviv	‍–‍81 kg
Silver medal – second place	2019 Paris	‍–‍81 kg
Bronze medal – third place	2015 Paris	‍–‍73 kg
Bronze medal – third place	2015 Abu Dhabi	‍–‍73 kg
Bronze medal – third place	2016 Paris	‍–‍73 kg
Bronze medal – third place	2024 Tbilisi	‍–‍81 kg
IJF Grand Prix
Gold medal – first place	2014 Havana	‍–‍73 kg
Gold medal – first place	2017 Tashkent	‍–‍81 kg
Gold medal – first place	2019 Tel Aviv	‍–‍81 kg
Gold medal – first place	2023 Zagreb	‍–‍81 kg
Silver medal – second place	2014 Düsseldorf	‍–‍73 kg
Silver medal – second place	2014 Astana	‍–‍73 kg
Silver medal – second place	2014 Jeju	‍–‍73 kg
Bronze medal – third place	2015 Düsseldorf	‍–‍73 kg
Bronze medal – third place	2015 Zagreb	‍–‍73 kg
Bronze medal – third place	2018 Budapest	‍–‍81 kg
European Junior Championships
Bronze medal – third place	2011 Lommel	‍–‍73 kg

Profile at external databases
- IJF: 3873
- JudoInside.com: 48909
- Updated on 23 March 2024

Sagi Aharon Muki (or Moki; Hebrew: שגיא אהרון מוקי; born 17 May 1992) is a retired Israeli Olympic and former world champion half-middleweight judoka. Muki is the 2019 World Champion. He also won the 2015 and 2018 European championships. In the 2020 Tokyo Olympics mixed team event, Muki was a member of the Israeli team that won a bronze medal.

In August 2011, Muki won the European Cup U20 in Berlin in the under 73 kilogram (161-pound) category. He won gold medals in February 2013 at the European Open in Tbilisi, Georgia, in June 2013 at the European Open Tallinn, and in October 2013 at the European Open Minsk in the under 73 weight class. He won the 2014 Baku Grand Slam in Azerbaijan in the under 73 kg category, and the following month he won another IJF World Tour gold medal, this time at the 2014 Havana Grand Prix in the under 73 kg category.

Muki is a two-time Israeli judo champion. In June 2015, representing Israel at the 2015 European Games in Baku, Azerbaijan, he won the gold medal and the European championship in judo in the under 73 kg weight class. Competing for Israel at the 2016 Summer Olympics he came in 5th place in the men's 73 kg event. He was ranked No. 1 in the world in March 2019.

Muki represented Israel at the 2024 Paris Olympics in judo in the men's 81 kg event, and came in ninth, and in the mixed team event, in which Team Israel came in ninth.

== Biography ==
Muki was born and raised in Netanya, Israel, to a family of Yemenite-Jewish descent. His parents are Rahamim and Orit Muki, who were born in Netanya; his grandparents were born in Yemen, and made aliyah.

At the age of eight, he chose to focus on judo, which he had been practicing for four years, despite excelling in football for a Netanya junior soccer team, and also playing basketball and soccer. He attended Tchernichovsky High School in Netanya. As of June 2015 he still resided with his parents, for reasons of convenience and proximity to the Wingate Institute sports training facility. He served in the Israel Defense Forces as a Sergeant in the Vehicle Division at the Sde Dov airbase. He is a student at Reichman University, with a double major in Economics and business administration, and in the school's hall of fame.

== Judo career ==
From the age of four, Muki has been coached by Israeli judoka Oren Smadja, who won the Olympic bronze medal in the men's 71 kg weight category in judo at the 1992 Summer Olympics in Barcelona. Smadja is also the national team coach, and Muki views Smadja as a fatherly figure. His club is Maccabi Netanya, and he met future Israeli judoka world champion Yarden Gerbi there when he was four years old. He noted in 2013: "It's important to me to serve the State as an athlete. This year, I got to play the national anthem in Georgia, Estonia, and Belarus, and last year in Germany. Every time the audience stands for the anthem, it's fun and brings me great pride".

=== 2011–14; World #2 ===
In April Muki came in fifth in the 2011 World Juniors Championships in the under 73-kilogram (161-pound) category. In August 2011 Muki won the European Cup U20 in Berlin in the under 73 kg category. In September, he came in third in the 2011 European Junior Championships in Lommel, Belgium, in the under 73 kg category. In December 2012, he won the Israeli Championships in the under 81 kilograms (179 lb) category in Ra'anana, Israel.

Muki won a gold medal at the European Open in February 2013 in Tbilisi, Georgia in the under 73 kg category. He also won gold medals at the European Open Tallinn in June 2013, and the European Open Minsk in October 2013 in the under 73 weight class. He won the Israeli Championship in the under 81 kg category in Ra'anana, Israel in December 2013.

In May, Muki won the 2014 Baku Grand Slam in Azerbaijan in the under 73 kg category. In June, he won another IJF World Tour gold medal, at the 2014 Havana Grand Prix in the under 73 kg category. In October 2014, he was ranked number three in the world in his weight class, and in May 2015 he had moved up to number two in the world.

=== 2015; European Champion ===
In June 2015, representing Israel at the 2015 European Games in judo in the under 73 kg category in Baku, Muki won the first gold medal for Israel in the inaugural European Games, and in doing so won the 2015 European Championships. In the quarterfinals he defeated then-reigning European champion Dex Elmont of the Netherlands. He defeated Nugzar Tatalashvili of Georgia in the final, throwing him for an ippon twenty-eight seconds prior to the end of their match, and after his victory he pointed with a smile at the Israeli flag on his judogi. He became the first Israeli men's European Judo Champion since Ariel Ze'evi, who won the championship four times. Muki received NIS 40,000 (approximately $10,500) from the Israel Olympic Committee for his achievement, the highest amount of any Israeli athlete, and a monthly stipend of NIS 8,500.

In October, Muki won a bronze medal in the 2015 Paris Grand Slam after defeating Shuai Sun from China. Two weeks later on 31 October, he won a bronze medal in the 2015 Abu Dhabi Grand Slam after defeating Belgian Dirk Van Tichelt.

=== 2016 Rio Olympics ===
In August 2016, Muki competed for the first time in his career for Israel at the 2016 Summer Olympics at the age of 24, two months after suffering two slipped discs in his lower back. In the first round he defeated former European champion Rok Drakšič of Slovenia with an ippon. In the second round he beat Igor Wandtke of Germany. In the quarter-finals, Muki defeated Nicholas Delpopolo of the United States. In the semi-finals, Muki lost to Rustam Orujov of Azerbaijan, and subsequently he was also defeated by Lasha Shavdatuashvili of Georgia for the bronze medal. Muki finished in fifth place.

=== 2017–18; European Champion ===
On 7 October, Muki competed at the 2017 Tashkent Grand Prix, his first competition since the 2016 olympics, and won the gold medal.

On 27 April, Muki took part in the 2018 European Championships in Tel Aviv and won the gold medal in the under 81 kg weight category. In the first round he defeated Jonathan Allardon of France by ippon, in the second round he defeated Matthias Casse of Belgium by waza-ari. He went on to defeat László Csoknyai of Hungary by ippon in the quarter final and Aslan Lappinagov of Russia by shidos in the semi-final. In the final Muki defeated Sami Chouchi of Belgium by waza-ari in golden score.

=== 2019; World Champion ===
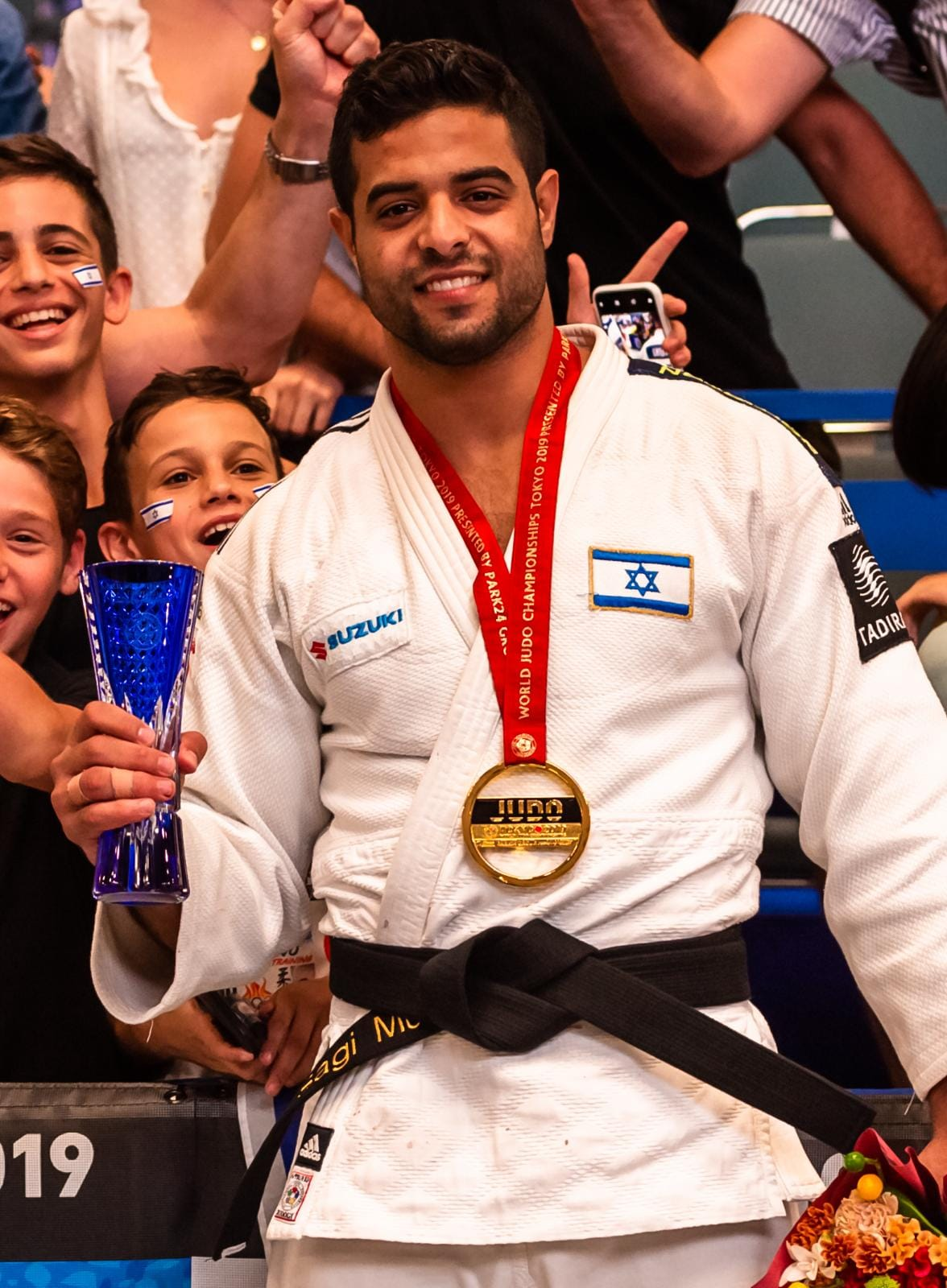
Sagi Muki, world champion, in 2019

At the 2019 World Championships in Tokyo, Muki became world champion when he won the gold medal in the under 81 kg weight category. Coming to the competition, Muki was ranked 2nd in the world and 5 out of his 6 matches that day, he won by ippon. He won his first 4 matches by ippon and in the semi-final he defeated Mohamed Abdelaal of Egypt by waza-ari. In the final, Muki faced Matthias Casse of Belgium and won by ippon due to 2 waza-ari scores.

=== 2020 Tokyo Olympics (in 2021); bronze medal ===
Muki represented Israel at the 2020 Summer Olympics, competing at the men's 81 kg weight category. After beating 2017 Pan American champion, Brazilian Eduardo Yudy Santos, in his first match, Muki lost to Austrian Shamil Borchashvili in the round of 16, ending his part of the individual contest. In the mixed team event, Muki was a member of the Israeli team that won a bronze medal.

=== 2021–present ===
Muki won a bronze medal in 2021 World Masters, held in Doha, Qatar. He also won a bronze medal at the 2021 European Championships in Portugal.

Muki won gold medals at the 2023 Zagreb Grand Prix in Croatia and the 2023 Tel Aviv Grand Slam.

In December 2023, Muki posted a video in which he spoke about his friendship with Iranian judoka Saeid Mollaei, and said:

When you refuse to speak out against Hamas, you are actually speaking against peace. If we do not recognize evil for what it is, we are throwing away any hope for good. For my sake, for Saeid’s sake, and for the sake of everyone, everywhere, who wants good to thrive in the face of evil, speak out. Be brave like Saeid. There is always hope for a peaceful future.

Muki won a bronze medal at the 2024 Tbilisi Grand Slam in Georgia.

=== 2024 Paris Olympics ===
Muki represented Israel at the 2024 Summer Olympics in judo in the men's 81 kg event, in which he defeated Timo Cavelius of Germany in his first match, lost to ultimate bronze medal winner Lee Joon-hwan of South Korea in his second match, and came in ninth. He also represented Israel in the mixed team event, in which Team Israel came in ninth. His coach, Oren Smadja, on his birthday had suffered the loss of his son Omer, a reservist, in battle in Gaza in the Gaza war a month earlier, and Muki said: "I've been with Oren since I was 5 years old; he's like a second father to me. The recent tragedy deeply affected me. In the first days after learning what happened, I couldn't find the strength to train, but I pulled myself together and turned this into motivation. For Omer and for all the brave soldiers, it was important to me not to give up."

=== Retirement ===
On 16 February 2026, Muki announced his retirement from competitive judo.

== TV appearances ==
Muki participates in the 11th season of Rokdim Im Kokhavim, the Israeli version of Dancing with the Stars.

== Titles ==
Year	Tournament	Place	Weight class	Ref.
2014	Grand Prix Düsseldorf	2nd place, silver medalist(s)	–73 kg	
2014	Grand Slam Baku	1st place, gold medalist(s)	–73 kg	
2014	Grand Prix Havana	1st place, gold medalist(s)	–73 kg	
2014	Grand Prix Astana	2nd place, silver medalist(s)	–73 kg	
2014	Grand Prix Jeju	2nd place, silver medalist(s)	–73 kg	
2015	Grand Prix Düsseldorf	3rd place, bronze medalist(s)	–73 kg	
2015	Grand Prix Zagreb	3rd place, bronze medalist(s)	–73 kg	
2015	European Games	1st place, gold medalist(s)	–73 kg	
2015	Grand Slam Paris	3rd place, bronze medalist(s)	–73 kg	
2015	Grand Slam Abu Dhabi	3rd place, bronze medalist(s)	–73 kg	
2016	Grand Slam Paris	3rd place, bronze medalist(s)	–73 kg	
2017	Grand Prix Tashkent	1st place, gold medalist(s)	–81 kg	
2018	European Championships	1st place, gold medalist(s)	–81 kg	
2018	Grand Prix Budapest	3rd place, bronze medalist(s)	–81 kg	
2018	Grand Slam Abu Dhabi	1st place, gold medalist(s)	–81 kg	
2019	Grand Prix Tel Aviv	1st place, gold medalist(s)	–81 kg	
2019	Grand Slam Paris	2nd place, silver medalist(s)	–81 kg	
2019	Grand Slam Ekaterinburg	1st place, gold medalist(s)	–81 kg	
2019	Grand Slam Baku	1st place, gold medalist(s)	–81 kg	
2019	World Championships	1st place, gold medalist(s)	–81 kg	
2019	World Masters	2nd place, silver medalist(s)	–81 kg	
2021	World Masters	3rd place, bronze medalist(s)	–81 kg	
2021	European Championships	3rd place, bronze medalist(s)	–81 kg	
2023	Grand Slam Tel Aviv	1st place, gold medalist(s)	–81 kg	
2023	Grand Prix Zagreb	1st place, gold medalist(s)	–81 kg	

== See also ==
- List of select Jewish judokas
- List of Jewish Olympic medalists
- List of Olympic medalists in judo
- List of World Judo Championships medalists
- List of 2015 European Games medal winners
- Sport in Israel
- Israel Judo Association
