= 2016 Judo Grand Prix =

2016 Judo Grand Prix may refer to the following competitions:

- 2016 Judo Grand Prix Almaty
- 2016 Judo Grand Prix Budapest
- 2016 Judo Grand Prix Dusseldorf
- 2016 Judo Grand Prix Havana
- 2016 Judo Grand Prix Samsun
- 2016 Judo Grand Prix Tbilisi
- 2016 Judo Grand Prix Ulaanbaatar
- 2016 Judo Grand Prix Zagreb
