= Judo at the 2015 European Games – Men's 73 kg =

Judo competition

Judo Men's 73 kg at the 2015 European Games
- Venue: Heydar Aliyev Arena
- Location: Baku, Azerbaijan
- Date: 26 June
- Competitors: 42 from 31 nations

Medalists
gold medal	Sagi Muki (1st title)	Israel
silver medal	Nugzar Tatalashvili	Georgia
bronze medal	Rok Drakšič	Slovenia
bronze medal	Dirk Van Tichelt	Belgium

Competition at external databases
- Links: IJF • JudoInside

The men's 73 kg judo event at the 2015 European Games in Baku was held on 26 June at the Heydar Aliyev Arena.

== Results ==
=== Finals ===
Semifinals
Dirk Van Tichelt (BEL)	000
Nugzar Tatalashvili (GEO)	010
Denis Iartsev (RUS)	000
Sagi Muki (ISR)	100

Final
Nugzar Tatalashvili (GEO)	000
Sagi Muki (ISR)	100

=== Repechage ===
Repechage
Nikola Gušić (MNE)	000
Rok Drakšič (SLO)	101

Third place
Rok Drakšič (SLO)	100
Denis Iartsev (RUS)	001

Repechage
Miklós Ungvári (HUN)	000
Dex Elmont (NED)	000

Third place
Dex Elmont (NED)	000
Dirk Van Tichelt (BEL)	010

=== Pool A ===
Round of 64
Christopher Völk (GER)	000
Jaromír Ježek (CZE)	100
Akil Gjakova (KOS)	000
Nikola Gušić (MNE)	100
Artem Khomula (UKR)	000
Damian Szwarnowiecki (POL)	100

Round of 32
Rustam Orujov (AZE)	000
Jaromír Ježek (CZE)	100
Cédric Bessi (MON)	010
Nikola Gušić (MNE)	100
Dirk Van Tichelt (BEL)	100
Damian Szwarnowiecki (POL)	000
Eduard Nicolaescu (ROU)	000
Kiyoshi Uematsu (ESP)	100

Round of 16
Jaromír Ježek (CZE)	002
Nikola Gušić (MNE)	101
Dirk Van Tichelt (BEL)	000
Kiyoshi Uematsu (ESP)	000

Quarterfinals
Nikola Gušić (MNE)	000
Dirk Van Tichelt (BEL)	100

=== Pool B ===
Round of 64
Bayram Ceylan (TUR)	000
Florent Urani (FRA)	100
Andrea Regis (ITA)	000
Aliaksei Ramanchyk (BLR)	002

Round of 32
Nugzar Tatalashvili (GEO)	000
Florent Urani (FRA)	000
Ljubiša Kovačević (SRB)	100
Tommy Macias (SWE)	000
Rok Drakšič (SLO)	002
Aliaksei Ramanchyk (BLR)	000
Dmitrijs Fedosejenkovs (LAT)	000
André Alves (POR)	100

Round of 16
Nugzar Tatalashvili (GEO)	100
Ljubiša Kovačević (SRB)	000
Rok Drakšič (SLO)	001
André Alves (POR)	000

Quarterfinals
Nugzar Tatalashvili (GEO)	000
Rok Drakšič (SLO)	000

=== Pool C ===
Round of 64
Eoin Fleming (IRL)	000
Hasan Vanlıoğlu (TUR)	100
Georgios Azoidis (GRE)	100
Marco Maddaloni (ITA)	000
Lasha Shavdatuashvili (GEO)	000
Pierre Duprat (FRA)	001

Round of 32
Denis Iartsev (RUS)	000
Hasan Vanlıoğlu (TUR)	000
Mihails Šteinbuks (LAT)	000
Javier Ramírez (ESP)	101
Miklós Ungvári (HUN)	101
Georgios Azoidis (GRE)	000
Jakub Ječmínek (CZE)	000
Pierre Duprat (FRA)	100

Round of 16
Denis Iartsev (RUS)	002
Javier Ramírez (ESP)	000
Miklós Ungvári (HUN)	100
Pierre Duprat (FRA)	001

Quarterfinals
Denis Iartsev (RUS)	000
Miklós Ungvári (HUN)	000

=== Pool D ===
Round of 64
Vadzim Shoka (BLR)	010
Sami Chouchi (BEL)	000
Eetu Laamanen (FIN)	100
Künter Rothberg (EST)	011

Round of 32
Dex Elmont (NED)	010
Vadzim Shoka (BLR)	000
Igli Ramosacaj (ALB)	000
Serhiy Drebot (UKR)	100
Sagi Muki (ISR)	100
Davit Nikoghosyan (ARM)	000
Jorge Fernandes (POR)	001
Eetu Laamanen (FIN)	000

Round of 16
Dex Elmont (NED)	010
Serhiy Drebot (UKR)	000
Sagi Muki (ISR)	100
Jorge Fernandes (POR)	000

Quarterfinals
Dex Elmont (NED)	000
Sagi Muki (ISR)	000
