= Lee Eun-ju (disambiguation) =

Lee Eun-ju (이은주; 1980–2005) was a South Korean actress.

Lee Eun-ju may also refer to:

- Lee Eun-ju (sport shooter) (born 1970), South Korean sport shooter
- Lee Eun-ju (gymnast) (born 1999), South Korean gymnast
- Lee Eun-ju (judoka) (born 1989), South Korean judoka

== See also ==
- Lee Eun-ju (basketball) (이언주)
