= 2014 Judo Grand Prix Tashkent =

Judo competition

Judo 2014 Judo Grand Prix Tashkent
- Location: Tashkent, Uzbekistan
- Dates: 16–18 October 2014
- Competitors: 282 from 42 nations

Competition at external databases
- Links: IJF • JudoInside

The 2014 Judo Grand Prix Tashkent was held in Tashkent, Uzbekistan from 16 to 18 October 2014.

== Medal summary ==
=== Men's events ===
Event	Gold	Silver	Bronze
Extra-lightweight (−60 kg)	Dashdavaagiin Amartüvshin (MGL)	Diyorbek Urozboev (UZB)	Gumar Kyrgyzbayev (KAZ)
Extra-lightweight (−60 kg)	Dashdavaagiin Amartüvshin (MGL)	Diyorbek Urozboev (UZB)	Ganboldyn Kherlen (MGL)
Half-lightweight (−66 kg)	Rishod Sobirov (UZB)	Dovdony Altansükh (MGL)	Sugoi Uriarte (ESP)
Half-lightweight (−66 kg)	Rishod Sobirov (UZB)	Dovdony Altansükh (MGL)	Denis Lavrentiev (RUS)
Lightweight (−73 kg)	Sainjargalyn Nyam-Ochir (MGL)	Khashbaataryn Tsagaanbaatar (MGL)	Pierre Duprat (FRA)
Lightweight (−73 kg)	Sainjargalyn Nyam-Ochir (MGL)	Khashbaataryn Tsagaanbaatar (MGL)	Zelimkhan Ozdoev (RUS)
Half-middleweight (−81 kg)	Vedat Albayrak (GRE)	Yakhyo Imamov (UZB)	Shakhzodbek Sabirov (UZB)
Half-middleweight (−81 kg)	Vedat Albayrak (GRE)	Yakhyo Imamov (UZB)	Otgonbaataryn Uuganbaatar (MGL)
Middleweight (−90 kg)	Alexandre Iddir (FRA)	Kirill Denisov (RUS)	Walter Facente (ITA)
Middleweight (−90 kg)	Alexandre Iddir (FRA)	Kirill Denisov (RUS)	Hatem Abd el Akher (EGY)
Half-heavyweight (−100 kg)	Ramadan Darwish (EGY)	Toma Nikiforov (BEL)	Martin Pacek (SWE)
Half-heavyweight (−100 kg)	Ramadan Darwish (EGY)	Toma Nikiforov (BEL)	Ramziddin Sayidov (UZB)
Heavyweight (+100 kg)	Battulgyn Temüülen (MGL)	Daniel Allerstorfer (AUT)	Barna Bor (HUN)
Heavyweight (+100 kg)	Battulgyn Temüülen (MGL)	Daniel Allerstorfer (AUT)	Elyor Masharipov (UZB)

=== Women's events ===
Event	Gold	Silver	Bronze
Extra-lightweight (−48 kg)	Charline Van Snick (BEL)	Sümeyye Akkuş (TUR)	Irina Dolgova (RUS)
Extra-lightweight (−48 kg)	Charline Van Snick (BEL)	Sümeyye Akkuş (TUR)	Otgontsetseg Galbadrakh (MGL)
Half-lightweight (−52 kg)	Andreea Chițu (ROU)	Adiyaasambuugiin Tsolmon (MGL)	Joana Ramos (POR)
Half-lightweight (−52 kg)	Andreea Chițu (ROU)	Adiyaasambuugiin Tsolmon (MGL)	Eleudis Valentim (BRA)
Lightweight (−57 kg)	Corina Căprioriu (ROU)	Camila Minakawa (ISR)	Arleta Podolak (POL)
Lightweight (−57 kg)	Corina Căprioriu (ROU)	Camila Minakawa (ISR)	Jovana Rogić (SRB)
Half-middleweight (−63 kg)	Yarden Gerbi (ISR)	Kathrin Unterwurzacher (AUT)	Martyna Trajdos (GER)
Half-middleweight (−63 kg)	Yarden Gerbi (ISR)	Kathrin Unterwurzacher (AUT)	Tsedevsürengiin Mönkhzayaa (MGL)
Middleweight (−70 kg)	Laura Vargas Koch (GER)	Bernadette Graf (AUT)	Katarzyna Kłys (POL)
Middleweight (−70 kg)	Laura Vargas Koch (GER)	Bernadette Graf (AUT)	Maria Portela (BRA)
Half-heavyweight (−78 kg)	Daria Pogorzelec (POL)	Ivana Maranić (CRO)	Luise Malzahn (GER)
Half-heavyweight (−78 kg)	Daria Pogorzelec (POL)	Ivana Maranić (CRO)	Natalie Powell (GBR)
Heavyweight (+78 kg)	Svitlana Iaromka (UKR)	Iryna Kindzerska (UKR)	Sarah Adlington (GBR)
Heavyweight (+78 kg)	Svitlana Iaromka (UKR)	Iryna Kindzerska (UKR)	Franziska Konitz (GER)

Source Results

=== Medal table ===
* Host nation (Uzbekistan)

Rank	Nation	Gold	Silver	Bronze	Total
1	Mongolia (MGL)	3	3	4	10
2	Romania (ROU)	2	0	0	2
3	Uzbekistan (UZB)*	1	2	3	6
4	Belgium (BEL)	1	1	0	2
4	Israel (ISR)	1	1	0	2
4	Ukraine (UKR)	1	1	0	2
7	Germany (GER)	1	0	3	4
8	Poland (POL)	1	0	2	3
9	Egypt (EGY)	1	0	1	2
9	France (FRA)	1	0	1	2
11	Greece (GRE)	1	0	0	1
12	Austria (AUT)	0	3	0	3
13	Russia (RUS)	0	1	3	4
14	Croatia (CRO)	0	1	0	1
14	Turkey (TUR)	0	1	0	1
16	Brazil (BRA)	0	0	2	2
16	Great Britain (GBR)	0	0	2	2
18	Hungary (HUN)	0	0	1	1
18	Italy (ITA)	0	0	1	1
18	Kazakhstan (KAZ)	0	0	1	1
18	Portugal (POR)	0	0	1	1
18	Serbia (SRB)	0	0	1	1
18	Spain (ESP)	0	0	1	1
18	Sweden (SWE)	0	0	1	1
Totals (24 entries)		14	14	28	56
