= 2018 Judo World Masters =

Judo competition

Judo 2018 Judo World Masters
- Venue: Guangzhou Gymnasium, Guangzhou
- Location: Guangzhou, China
- Dates: 15–16 December 2018
- Competitors: 231 from 53 nations

Competition at external databases
- Links: IJF • EJU • JudoInside

The 2018 Judo World Masters were held in Guangzhou, China, from 15 to 16 December 2018.

== Medal summary ==
=== Medal table ===
Rank	Nation	Gold	Silver	Bronze	Total
1	Japan (JPN)	7	3	4	14
2	Georgia (GEO)	2	1	2	5
3	Russia (RUS)	1	1	4	6
4	France (FRA)	1	1	0	2
4	Kosovo (KOS)	1	1	0	2
6	Azerbaijan (AZE)	1	0	0	1
6	Spain (ESP)	1	0	0	1
8	Brazil (BRA)	0	1	2	3
8	Mongolia (MGL)	0	1	2	3
10	Canada (CAN)	0	1	1	2
11	Colombia (COL)	0	1	0	1
11	Cuba (CUB)	0	1	0	1
11	Hungary (HUN)	0	1	0	1
11	Israel (ISR)	0	1	0	1
15	Kazakhstan (KAZ)	0	0	2	2
15	Netherlands (NED)	0	0	2	2
15	Slovenia (SLO)	0	0	2	2
18	Austria (AUT)	0	0	1	1
18	Belgium (BEL)	0	0	1	1
18	Bosnia and Herzegovina (BIH)	0	0	1	1
18	Egypt (EGY)	0	0	1	1
18	Great Britain (GBR)	0	0	1	1
18	South Korea (KOR)	0	0	1	1
18	Turkey (TUR)	0	0	1	1
Totals (24 entries)		14	14	28	56

=== Men's events ===
Event	Gold	Silver	Bronze
Extra-lightweight (-60 kg)	Robert Mshvidobadze; Russia	Amiran Papinashvili; Georgia	Amartuvshin Dashdavaa; Mongolia
Extra-lightweight (-60 kg)	Robert Mshvidobadze; Russia	Amiran Papinashvili; Georgia	Yeldos Smetov; Kazakhstan
Half-lightweight (-66 kg)	Joshiro Maruyama; Japan	Baruch Shmailov; Israel	Vazha Margvelashvili; Georgia
Half-lightweight (-66 kg)	Joshiro Maruyama; Japan	Baruch Shmailov; Israel	Altansukh Dovdon; Mongolia
Lightweight (-73 kg)	Rustam Orujov; Azerbaijan	Arthur Margelidon; Canada	An Chang-rim; South Korea
Lightweight (-73 kg)	Rustam Orujov; Azerbaijan	Arthur Margelidon; Canada	Lasha Shavdatuashvili; Georgia
Half-middleweight (-81 kg)	Takeshi Saski; Japan	Aslan Lappinagov; Russia	Vedat Albayrak; Turkey
Half-middleweight (-81 kg)	Takeshi Saski; Japan	Aslan Lappinagov; Russia	Frank de Wit; Netherlands
Middleweight (-90 kg)	Nikoloz Sherazadishvili; Spain	Krisztián Tóth; Hungary	Mikhail Igolnikov; Russia
Middleweight (-90 kg)	Nikoloz Sherazadishvili; Spain	Krisztián Tóth; Hungary	Islam Bozbayev; Kazakhstan
Half-heavyweight (-100 kg)	Varlam Liparteliani; Georgia	Otgonbaatar Lkhagvasuren; Mongolia	Ramadan Darwish; Egypt
Half-heavyweight (-100 kg)	Varlam Liparteliani; Georgia	Otgonbaatar Lkhagvasuren; Mongolia	Kentaro Iida; Japan
Heavyweight (+100 kg)	Guram Tushishvili; Georgia	Rafael Silva; Brazil	Tamerlan Bashaev; Russia
Heavyweight (+100 kg)	Guram Tushishvili; Georgia	Rafael Silva; Brazil	David Moura; Brazil

=== Women's events ===
Event	Gold	Silver	Bronze
Extra-lightweight (-48 kg)	Distria Krasniqi; Kosovo	Ami Kondo; Japan	Maruša Štangar; Slovenia
Extra-lightweight (-48 kg)	Distria Krasniqi; Kosovo	Ami Kondo; Japan	Irina Dolgova; Russia
Half-lightweight (-52 kg)	Natsumi Tsunoda; Japan	Amandine Buchard; France	Natalia Kuziutina; Russia
Half-lightweight (-52 kg)	Natsumi Tsunoda; Japan	Amandine Buchard; France	Charline Van Snick; Belgium
Lightweight (-57 kg)	Tsukasa Yoshida; Japan	Nora Gjakova; Kosovo	Jessica Klimkait; Canada
Lightweight (-57 kg)	Tsukasa Yoshida; Japan	Nora Gjakova; Kosovo	Momo Tamaoki; Japan
Half-middleweight (-63 kg)	Clarisse Agbegnenou; France	Nami Nabekura; Japan	Tina Trstenjak; Slovenia
Half-middleweight (-63 kg)	Clarisse Agbegnenou; France	Nami Nabekura; Japan	Miku Tashiro; Japan
Middleweight (-70 kg)	Saki Niizoe; Japan	Yuri Alvear; Colombia	Sanne van Dijke; Netherlands
Middleweight (-70 kg)	Saki Niizoe; Japan	Yuri Alvear; Colombia	Michaela Polleres; Austria
Half-heavyweight (-78 kg)	Mami Umeki; Japan	Ruika Sato; Japan	Natalie Powell; Great Britain
Half-heavyweight (-78 kg)	Mami Umeki; Japan	Ruika Sato; Japan	Shori Hamada; Japan
Heavyweight (+78 kg)	Akira Sone; Japan	Idalys Ortiz; Cuba	Larisa Cerić; Bosnia and Herzegovina
Heavyweight (+78 kg)	Akira Sone; Japan	Idalys Ortiz; Cuba	Maria Suelen Altheman; Brazil
