= Tsogtgerel Khutag =

Mongolian judoka (born 1992)

Personal information
- Nationality: Mongolian
- Born: 21 May 1992 (age 34)
- Occupation: Judoka

Sport
- Country: Mongolia
- Sport: Judo
- Weight class: –90 kg, –100 kg

Achievements and titles
- World Champ.: R64 (2013)
- Asian Champ.: 7th (2013)
Medal record
Men's judo
Representing Mongolia
IJF Grand Prix
Silver medal – second place	2016 Qingdao	–100 kg
Bronze medal – third place	2016 Samsun	–100 kg

Profile at external databases
- IJF: 3708
- JudoInside.com: 72107
- Updated on 8 December 2022

Tsogtgerel Khutag (born 21 May 1992) is a Mongolian judoka.

He is the silver medallist of the 2016 Judo Grand Prix Qingdao in the -100 kg category.
