= 2015 Judo Grand Prix Tashkent =

Judo competition

Judo 2015 Judo Grand Prix Tashkent
- Venue: Sport Hall
- Location: Tashkent, Uzbekistan
- Dates: 1–3 October 2015
- Competitors: 354 from 52 nations

Competition at external databases
- Links: IJF • EJU • JudoInside

The 2015 Judo Grand Prix Tashkent was held at the Sport Hall in Tashkent, Uzbekistan from 1 to 3 October 2015.

== Medal summary ==
=== Men's events ===
Event	Gold	Silver	Bronze
Extra-lightweight (−60 kg)	Yuma Oshima (JPN)	Sharafuddin Lutfillaev (UZB)	Diyorbek Urozboev (UZB)
Extra-lightweight (−60 kg)	Yuma Oshima (JPN)	Sharafuddin Lutfillaev (UZB)	Otar Bestaev (KGZ)
Half-lightweight (−66 kg)	Hifumi Abe (JPN)	Ma Duanbin (CHN)	Dzmitry Shershan (BLR)
Half-lightweight (−66 kg)	Hifumi Abe (JPN)	Ma Duanbin (CHN)	Dovdony Altansükh (MGL)
Lightweight (−73 kg)	Mirali Sharipov (UZB)	Nuno Saraiva (POR)	Hong Kuk-hyon (PRK)
Lightweight (−73 kg)	Mirali Sharipov (UZB)	Nuno Saraiva (POR)	Giyosjon Boboev (UZB)
Half-middleweight (−81 kg)	Sergiu Toma (UAE)	Ivan Vorobev (RUS)	Aziz Kalkamanuly (KAZ)
Half-middleweight (−81 kg)	Sergiu Toma (UAE)	Ivan Vorobev (RUS)	László Csoknyai (HUN)
Middleweight (−90 kg)	Marc Odenthal (GER)	Komronshokh Ustopiriyon (TJK)	Sherali Juraev (UZB)
Middleweight (−90 kg)	Marc Odenthal (GER)	Komronshokh Ustopiriyon (TJK)	Mihael Žgank (SLO)
Half-heavyweight (−100 kg)	Aaron Wolf (JPN)	Zlatko Kumrić (CRO)	Niyaz Bilalov (RUS)
Half-heavyweight (−100 kg)	Aaron Wolf (JPN)	Zlatko Kumrić (CRO)	Soyib Kurbonov (UZB)
Heavyweight (+100 kg)	Kenta Nishigata (JPN)	Battulgyn Temüülen (MGL)	Daniel Allerstorfer (AUT)
Heavyweight (+100 kg)	Kenta Nishigata (JPN)	Battulgyn Temüülen (MGL)	André Breitbarth (GER)

=== Women's events ===
Event	Gold	Silver	Bronze
Extra-lightweight (−48 kg)	Mönkhbatyn Urantsetseg (MGL)	Jeong Bo-kyeong (KOR)	Otgontsetseg Galbadrakh (KAZ)
Extra-lightweight (−48 kg)	Mönkhbatyn Urantsetseg (MGL)	Jeong Bo-kyeong (KOR)	Irina Dolgova (RUS)
Half-lightweight (−52 kg)	Gülbadam Babamuratowa (TKM)	Maria Ertl (GER)	Gili Cohen (ISR)
Half-lightweight (−52 kg)	Gülbadam Babamuratowa (TKM)	Maria Ertl (GER)	Priscilla Gneto (FRA)
Lightweight (−57 kg)	Kim Jan-di (KOR)	Irina Zabludina (RUS)	Hélène Receveaux (FRA)
Lightweight (−57 kg)	Kim Jan-di (KOR)	Irina Zabludina (RUS)	Liu Yang (CHN)
Half-middleweight (−63 kg)	Edwige Gwend (ITA)	Hilde Drexler (AUT)	Büşra Katipoğlu (TUR)
Half-middleweight (−63 kg)	Edwige Gwend (ITA)	Hilde Drexler (AUT)	Franciska Szabó (HUN)
Middleweight (−70 kg)	Kim Seong-yeon (KOR)	Esther Stam (GEO)	Katarzyna Kłys (POL)
Middleweight (−70 kg)	Kim Seong-yeon (KOR)	Esther Stam (GEO)	Zhou Chao (CHN)
Half-heavyweight (−78 kg)	Natalie Powell (GBR)	Madeleine Malonga (FRA)	Sol Kyong (PRK)
Half-heavyweight (−78 kg)	Natalie Powell (GBR)	Madeleine Malonga (FRA)	Gemma Gibbons (GBR)
Heavyweight (+78 kg)	Kim Min-jeong (KOR)	Ma Sisi (CHN)	Yu Song (CHN)
Heavyweight (+78 kg)	Kim Min-jeong (KOR)	Ma Sisi (CHN)	Kayra Sayit (TUR)

Source Results

=== Medal table ===
* Host nation (Uzbekistan)

Rank	Nation	Gold	Silver	Bronze	Total
1	Japan (JPN)	4	0	0	4
2	South Korea (KOR)	3	1	0	4
3	Uzbekistan (UZB)*	1	1	4	6
4	Germany (GER)	1	1	1	3
4	Mongolia (MGL)	1	1	1	3
6	Great Britain (GBR)	1	0	1	2
7	Italy (ITA)	1	0	0	1
7	Turkmenistan (TKM)	1	0	0	1
7	United Arab Emirates (UAE)	1	0	0	1
10	China (CHN)	0	2	3	5
11	Russia (RUS)	0	2	2	4
12	France (FRA)	0	1	2	3
13	Austria (AUT)	0	1	1	2
14	Croatia (CRO)	0	1	0	1
14	Georgia (GEO)	0	1	0	1
14	Portugal (POR)	0	1	0	1
14	Tajikistan (TJK)	0	1	0	1
18	Hungary (HUN)	0	0	2	2
18	Kazakhstan (KAZ)	0	0	2	2
18	North Korea (PRK)	0	0	2	2
18	Turkey (TUR)	0	0	2	2
22	Belarus (BLR)	0	0	1	1
22	Israel (ISR)	0	0	1	1
22	Kyrgyzstan (KGZ)	0	0	1	1
22	Poland (POL)	0	0	1	1
22	Slovenia (SLO)	0	0	1	1
Totals (26 entries)		14	14	28	56
