= 2015 Judo Grand Prix Ulaanbaatar =

Judo competition in Ulaanbaatar, Mongolia

Judo 2015 Judo Grand Prix Ulaanbaatar
- Venue: Buyant Ukhaa Sport Palace
- Location: Ulaanbaatar, Mongolia
- Dates: 3–5 July 2015
- Competitors: 201 from 35 nations

Competition at external databases
- Links: IJF • EJU • JudoInside

The 2015 Judo Grand Prix Ulaanbaatar was held at Buyant Ukhaa Sport Palace in Ulaanbaatar, Mongolia from 3 to 5 July 2015.

== Medal summary ==
=== Men's events ===
Event	Gold	Silver	Bronze
Extra-lightweight (−60 kg)	Dashdavaagiin Amartüvshin (MGL)	Ganbatyn Boldbaatar (MGL)	Ganboldyn Kherlen (MGL)
Extra-lightweight (−60 kg)	Dashdavaagiin Amartüvshin (MGL)	Ganbatyn Boldbaatar (MGL)	Tsend-Ochiryn Tsogtbaatar (MGL)
Half-lightweight (−66 kg)	Davaadorjiin Tömörkhüleg (MGL)	Hifumi Abe (JPN)	Arsen Galstyan (RUS)
Half-lightweight (−66 kg)	Davaadorjiin Tömörkhüleg (MGL)	Hifumi Abe (JPN)	Dovdony Altansükh (MGL)
Lightweight (−73 kg)	Sai Yinjirigala (CHN)	Sainjargalyn Nyam-Ochir (MGL)	Ganbaataryn Odbayar (MGL)
Lightweight (−73 kg)	Sai Yinjirigala (CHN)	Sainjargalyn Nyam-Ochir (MGL)	Sun Shuai (CHN)
Half-middleweight (−81 kg)	Antoine Valois-Fortier (CAN)	Attila Ungvári (HUN)	Saeid Mollaei (IRI)
Half-middleweight (−81 kg)	Antoine Valois-Fortier (CAN)	Attila Ungvári (HUN)	Nyamsürengiin Dagvasüren (MGL)
Middleweight (−90 kg)	Lkhagvasürengiin Otgonbaatar (MGL)	Cheng Xunzhao (CHN)	Joakim Dvärby (SWE)
Middleweight (−90 kg)	Lkhagvasürengiin Otgonbaatar (MGL)	Cheng Xunzhao (CHN)	Erkin Doniyorov (UZB)
Half-heavyweight (−100 kg)	Aaron Wolf (JPN)	Martin Pacek (SWE)	Benjamin Fletcher (GBR)
Half-heavyweight (−100 kg)	Aaron Wolf (JPN)	Martin Pacek (SWE)	Javad Mahjoub (IRI)
Heavyweight (+100 kg)	Kenta Nishigata (JPN)	Sven Heinle (GER)	Ölziibayaryn Düürenbayar (MGL)
Heavyweight (+100 kg)	Kenta Nishigata (JPN)	Sven Heinle (GER)	Battulgyn Temüülen (MGL)

=== Women's events ===
Event	Gold	Silver	Bronze
Extra-lightweight (−48 kg)	Laëtitia Payet (FRA)	Kang Yu-jeong (KOR)	Bishreltiin Khorloodoi (MGL)
Extra-lightweight (−48 kg)	Laëtitia Payet (FRA)	Kang Yu-jeong (KOR)	Alexandra Podryadova (KAZ)
Half-lightweight (−52 kg)	Ai Shishime (JPN)	Adiyaasambuugiin Tsolmon (MGL)	Baljinnyamyn Bat-Erdene (MGL)
Half-lightweight (−52 kg)	Ai Shishime (JPN)	Adiyaasambuugiin Tsolmon (MGL)	Mönkhbaataryn Bundmaa (MGL)
Lightweight (−57 kg)	Dorjsürengiin Sumiyaa (MGL)	Hélène Receveaux (FRA)	Ri Hyo-sun (PRK)
Lightweight (−57 kg)	Dorjsürengiin Sumiyaa (MGL)	Hélène Receveaux (FRA)	Kaori Matsumoto (JPN)
Half-middleweight (−63 kg)	Tsend-Ayuushiin Tserennadmid (MGL)	Miho Minei (JPN)	Kathrin Unterwurzacher (AUT)
Half-middleweight (−63 kg)	Tsend-Ayuushiin Tserennadmid (MGL)	Miho Minei (JPN)	Han Hee-ju (KOR)
Middleweight (−70 kg)	Bernadette Graf (AUT)	Zhou Chao (CHN)	Iljana Marzok (GER)
Middleweight (−70 kg)	Bernadette Graf (AUT)	Zhou Chao (CHN)	Antónia Moreira (ANG)
Half-heavyweight (−78 kg)	Gemma Gibbons (GBR)	Sarah Myriam Mazouz (GAB)	Rika Takayama (JPN)
Half-heavyweight (−78 kg)	Gemma Gibbons (GBR)	Sarah Myriam Mazouz (GAB)	Akari Ogata (JPN)
Heavyweight (+78 kg)	Qin Qian (CHN)	Carolin Weiß (GER)	Marine Erb (FRA)
Heavyweight (+78 kg)	Qin Qian (CHN)	Carolin Weiß (GER)	Ma Sisi (CHN)

Source Results

=== Medal table ===
* Host nation (Mongolia)

Rank	Nation	Gold	Silver	Bronze	Total
1	Mongolia (MGL)*	5	3	10	18
2	Japan (JPN)	3	2	3	8
3	China (CHN)	2	2	2	6
4	France (FRA)	1	1	1	3
5	Austria (AUT)	1	0	1	2
5	Great Britain (GBR)	1	0	1	2
7	Canada (CAN)	1	0	0	1
8	Germany (GER)	0	2	1	3
9	South Korea (KOR)	0	1	1	2
9	Sweden (SWE)	0	1	1	2
11	Gabon (GAB)	0	1	0	1
11	Hungary (HUN)	0	1	0	1
13	Iran (IRI)	0	0	2	2
14	Angola (ANG)	0	0	1	1
14	Kazakhstan (KAZ)	0	0	1	1
14	North Korea (PRK)	0	0	1	1
14	Russia (RUS)	0	0	1	1
14	Uzbekistan (UZB)	0	0	1	1
Totals (18 entries)		14	14	28	56
