= Erina Ike =

Japanese judoka (born 1995)

Personal information
- Nationality: Japanese
- Born: 2 May 1996 (age 30)
- Occupation: Judoka

Sport
- Country: Japan
- Sport: Judo
- Weight class: ‍–‍70 kg
Medal record
Women's judo
Representing Japan
IJF Grand Prix
Gold medal – first place	2016 Ulaanbaatar	‍–‍70 kg
Gold medal – first place	2016 Qingdao	‍–‍70 kg
World Juniors Championships
Gold medal – first place	2014 Fort Lauderdale	Women's team
World Cadets Championships
Gold medal – first place	2011 Kyiv	‍–‍63 kg

Profile at external databases
- IJF: 7358
- JudoInside.com: 76645
- Updated on 8 December 2022

Erina Ike (born 2 May 1995) is a Japanese judoka.

Ike is the gold medalist of the 2016 Judo Grand Prix Qingdao in the ‍–‍70 kg category.
