= 2017 Judo Grand Prix Antalya =

Judo competition

Judo 2017 Judo Grand Prix Antalya
- Venue: Antalya Arena Sports Hall
- Location: Antalya, Turkey
- Dates: 7–9 April 2017
- Competitors: 252 from 34 nations

Competition at external databases
- Links: IJF • EJU • JudoInside

The 2017 Judo Grand Prix Antalya was held at the Antalya Arena Sports Hall in Antalya, Turkey, from 7 to 9 April 2017.

== Medal summary ==
=== Men's events ===
Event	Gold	Silver	Bronze
Extra-lightweight (−60 kg)	Gusman Kyrgyzbayev (KAZ)	Bekir Özlü (TUR)	Amartuvshin Bayaraa (MGL)
Extra-lightweight (−60 kg)	Gusman Kyrgyzbayev (KAZ)	Bekir Özlü (TUR)	Ahmet Şahin Kaba (TUR)
Half-lightweight (−66 kg)	Abdula Abdulzhalilov (RUS)	Bektur Rysmambetov (KGZ)	Davaadorjiin Tömörkhüleg (MGL)
Half-lightweight (−66 kg)	Abdula Abdulzhalilov (RUS)	Bektur Rysmambetov (KGZ)	Baruch Shmailov (ISR)
Lightweight (−73 kg)	Mirzohid Farmonov (UZB)	Hasan Vanlıoğlu (TUR)	Tohar Butbul (ISR)
Lightweight (−73 kg)	Mirzohid Farmonov (UZB)	Hasan Vanlıoğlu (TUR)	Hidayat Heydarov (AZE)
Half-middleweight (−81 kg)	Stanislav Semenov (RUS)	Min-Ki Song (KOR)	Murat Khabachirov (RUS)
Half-middleweight (−81 kg)	Stanislav Semenov (RUS)	Min-Ki Song (KOR)	Nyamsürengiin Dagvasüren (MGL)
Middleweight (−90 kg)	Gantulgyn Altanbagana (MGL)	Komronshokh Ustopiriyon (TJK)	Magomed Magomedov (RUS)
Middleweight (−90 kg)	Gantulgyn Altanbagana (MGL)	Komronshokh Ustopiriyon (TJK)	Aleksandar Kukolj (SRB)
Half-heavyweight (−100 kg)	Adlan Bisultanov (RUS)	Maxim Rakov (KAZ)	Elkhan Mammadov (AZE)
Half-heavyweight (−100 kg)	Adlan Bisultanov (RUS)	Maxim Rakov (KAZ)	Niyaz Ilyasov (RUS)
Heavyweight (+100 kg)	Lukáš Krpálek (CZE)	Iurii Krakovetskii (KGZ)	Žarko Ćulum (SRB)
Heavyweight (+100 kg)	Lukáš Krpálek (CZE)	Iurii Krakovetskii (KGZ)	Musa Tumenov (RUS)

=== Women's events ===
Event	Gold	Silver	Bronze
Extra-lightweight (−48 kg)	Otgontsetseg Galbadrakh (KAZ)	Shira Rishony (ISR)	Sabina Giliazova (RUS)
Extra-lightweight (−48 kg)	Otgontsetseg Galbadrakh (KAZ)	Shira Rishony (ISR)	Noa Minsker (ISR)
Half-lightweight (−52 kg)	Distria Krasniqi (KOS)	Gili Cohen (ISR)	Nazakat Azizova (AZE)
Half-lightweight (−52 kg)	Distria Krasniqi (KOS)	Gili Cohen (ISR)	Ariel Bezalel (ISR)
Lightweight (−57 kg)	Nora Gjakova (KOS)	Timna Nelson-Levy (ISR)	Khulan Tseregbaatar (MGL)
Lightweight (−57 kg)	Nora Gjakova (KOS)	Timna Nelson-Levy (ISR)	Bekky Livesey (GBR)
Half-middleweight (−63 kg)	Kathrin Unterwurzacher (AUT)	Marian Urdabayeva (KAZ)	Katharina Haecker (AUS)
Half-middleweight (−63 kg)	Kathrin Unterwurzacher (AUT)	Marian Urdabayeva (KAZ)	Lubjana Piovesana (GBR)
Middleweight (−70 kg)	Anka Pogačnik (SLO)	Elvismar Rodríguez (VEN)	Barbara Matić (CRO)
Middleweight (−70 kg)	Anka Pogačnik (SLO)	Elvismar Rodríguez (VEN)	Gemma Howell (GBR)
Half-heavyweight (−78 kg)	Anastasiya Dmitrieva (RUS)	Yarden Mayersohn (ISR)	Albina Amangeldiyeva (KAZ)
Half-heavyweight (−78 kg)	Anastasiya Dmitrieva (RUS)	Yarden Mayersohn (ISR)	Zarina Raifova (KAZ)
Heavyweight (+78 kg)	Kayra Sayit (TUR)	Larisa Cerić (BIH)	Kübra Kara (TUR)
Heavyweight (+78 kg)	Kayra Sayit (TUR)	Larisa Cerić (BIH)	Battulgyn Mönkhtuyaa (MGL)

Source Results

=== Medal table ===
* Host nation (Turkey)

Rank	Nation	Gold	Silver	Bronze	Total
1	Russia (RUS)	4	0	5	9
2	Kazakhstan (KAZ)	2	2	2	6
3	Kosovo (KOS)	2	0	0	2
4	Turkey (TUR)	1	2	2	5
5	Mongolia (MGL)	1	0	5	6
6	Austria (AUT)	1	0	0	1
6	Czech Republic (CZE)	1	0	0	1
6	Slovenia (SLO)	1	0	0	1
6	Uzbekistan (UZB)	1	0	0	1
10	Israel (ISR)	0	4	4	8
11	Kyrgyzstan (KGZ)	0	2	0	2
12	Bosnia and Herzegovina (BIH)	0	1	0	1
12	South Korea (KOR)	0	1	0	1
12	Tajikistan (TJK)	0	1	0	1
12	Venezuela (VEN)	0	1	0	1
16	Azerbaijan (AZE)	0	0	3	3
16	Great Britain (GBR)	0	0	3	3
18	Serbia (SRB)	0	0	2	2
19	Australia (AUS)	0	0	1	1
19	Croatia (CRO)	0	0	1	1
Totals (20 entries)		14	14	28	56
