= 2017 Judo Grand Prix The Hague =

Judo competition

Judo 2017 Judo Grand Prix The Hague
- Venue: Sportcampus Zuiderpark
- Location: The Hague, Netherlands
- Dates: 17–19 November 2017
- Competitors: 231 from 43 nations

Competition at external databases
- Links: IJF • JudoInside

The 2017 Judo Grand Prix The Hague was held at the Sportcampus Zuiderpark in The Hague, Netherlands, from 17 to 19 November 2017.

== Medal summary ==
=== Men's events ===
Event	Gold	Silver	Bronze
Extra-lightweight (−60 kg)	Bekir Özlü (TUR)	Ashley McKenzie (GBR)	Dashdavaagiin Amartüvshin (MGL)
Extra-lightweight (−60 kg)	Bekir Özlü (TUR)	Ashley McKenzie (GBR)	Amartuvshin Bayaraa (MGL)
Half-lightweight (−66 kg)	Yondonperenlein Baskhüü (MGL)	Yakub Shamilov (RUS)	Alberto Gaitero (ESP)
Half-lightweight (−66 kg)	Yondonperenlein Baskhüü (MGL)	Yakub Shamilov (RUS)	Islam Khametov (RUS)
Lightweight (−73 kg)	Khadbaatar Narankhuu (MGL)	Victor Scvortov (UAE)	Tsend-Ochiryn Tsogtbaatar (MGL)
Lightweight (−73 kg)	Khadbaatar Narankhuu (MGL)	Victor Scvortov (UAE)	Anthony Zingg (GER)
Half-middleweight (−81 kg)	Ivan Vorobev (RUS)	Dominic Ressel (GER)	Saeid Mollaei (IRI)
Half-middleweight (−81 kg)	Ivan Vorobev (RUS)	Dominic Ressel (GER)	Matthias Casse (BEL)
Middleweight (−90 kg)	Aleksandar Kukolj (SRB)	Magomed Magomedov (RUS)	Rafal Kozlowski (POL)
Middleweight (−90 kg)	Aleksandar Kukolj (SRB)	Magomed Magomedov (RUS)	Jesper Smink (NED)
Half-heavyweight (−100 kg)	Kazbek Zankishiev (RUS)	Joakim Dvärby (SWE)	Michael Korrel (NED)
Half-heavyweight (−100 kg)	Kazbek Zankishiev (RUS)	Joakim Dvärby (SWE)	Jelle Snippe (NED)
Heavyweight (+100 kg)	Roy Meyer (NED)	Maciej Sarnacki (POL)	Soslan Bostanov (RUS)
Heavyweight (+100 kg)	Roy Meyer (NED)	Maciej Sarnacki (POL)	Javad Mahjoub (IRI)

=== Women's events ===
Event	Gold	Silver	Bronze
Extra-lightweight (−48 kg)	Daria Bilodid (UKR)	Otgontsetseg Galbadrakh (KAZ)	Taciana Cesar (GBS)
Extra-lightweight (−48 kg)	Daria Bilodid (UKR)	Otgontsetseg Galbadrakh (KAZ)	Katharina Menz (GER)
Half-lightweight (−52 kg)	Distria Krasniqi (KOS)	Estrella López Sheriff (ESP)	Charline Van Snick (BEL)
Half-lightweight (−52 kg)	Distria Krasniqi (KOS)	Estrella López Sheriff (ESP)	Mönkhbatyn Urantsetseg (MGL)
Lightweight (−57 kg)	Nora Gjakova (KOS)	Theresa Stoll (GER)	Amelie Stoll (GER)
Lightweight (−57 kg)	Nora Gjakova (KOS)	Theresa Stoll (GER)	Martina Lo Giudice (ITA)
Half-middleweight (−63 kg)	Juul Franssen (NED)	Alice Schlesinger (GBR)	Stéfanie Tremblay (CAN)
Half-middleweight (−63 kg)	Juul Franssen (NED)	Alice Schlesinger (GBR)	Sanne Vermeer (NED)
Middleweight (−70 kg)	Kim Polling (NED)	Sanne van Dijke (NED)	Laura Vargas Koch (GER)
Middleweight (−70 kg)	Kim Polling (NED)	Sanne van Dijke (NED)	Miriam Butkereit (GER)
Half-heavyweight (−78 kg)	Guusje Steenhuis (NED)	Marhinde Verkerk (NED)	Luise Malzahn (GER)
Half-heavyweight (−78 kg)	Guusje Steenhuis (NED)	Marhinde Verkerk (NED)	Karen Stevenson (NED)
Heavyweight (+78 kg)	Tessie Savelkouls (NED)	Sandra Jablonskytė (LTU)	Kristin Buessow (GER)
Heavyweight (+78 kg)	Tessie Savelkouls (NED)	Sandra Jablonskytė (LTU)	Sarah Adlington (GBR)

Source Results

=== Medal table ===
* Host nation (Netherlands)

Rank	Nation	Gold	Silver	Bronze	Total
1	Netherlands (NED)*	5	2	5	12
2	Russia (RUS)	2	2	2	6
3	Mongolia (MGL)	2	0	4	6
4	Kosovo (KOS)	2	0	0	2
5	Serbia (SRB)	1	0	0	1
5	Turkey (TUR)	1	0	0	1
5	Ukraine (UKR)	1	0	0	1
8	Germany (GER)	0	2	7	9
9	Great Britain (GBR)	0	2	1	3
10	Poland (POL)	0	1	1	2
10	Spain (ESP)	0	1	1	2
12	Kazakhstan (KAZ)	0	1	0	1
12	Lithuania (LTU)	0	1	0	1
12	Sweden (SWE)	0	1	0	1
12	United Arab Emirates (UAE)	0	1	0	1
16	Belgium (BEL)	0	0	2	2
16	Iran (IRI)	0	0	2	2
18	Canada (CAN)	0	0	1	1
18	Guinea-Bissau (GBS)	0	0	1	1
18	Italy (ITA)	0	0	1	1
Totals (20 entries)		14	14	28	56
