= Dovdony Altansükh =

Mongolian judoka (born 1988)

Personal information
- Native name: Довдонгийн Алтансүх
- Born: 6 January 1988 (age 38) Uvs, Mongolia
- Occupation: Judoka
- Height: 163 cm (5 ft 4 in)

Sport
- Country: Mongolia
- Sport: Judo
- Weight class: ‍–‍66 kg

Achievements and titles
- Asian Champ.: (gold) (2016)
Medal record
Men's judo
Representing Mongolia
Asian Championships
| Gold medal – first place | 2016 Tashkent | ‍–‍66 kg |
World Masters
| Bronze medal – third place | 2018 Guangzhou | ‍–‍66 kg |
IJF Grand Slam
| Bronze medal – third place | 2015 Tyumen | ‍–‍66 kg |
| Bronze medal – third place | 2015 Paris | ‍–‍66 kg |
| Bronze medal – third place | 2016 Tokyo | ‍–‍66 kg |
IJF Grand Prix
| Gold medal – first place | 2016 Ulaanbaatar | ‍–‍66 kg |
| Silver medal – second place | 2014 Tashkent | ‍–‍66 kg |
| Silver medal – second place | 2016 Samsun | ‍–‍66 kg |
| Bronze medal – third place | 2014 Ulaanbaatar | ‍–‍66 kg |
| Bronze medal – third place | 2015 Ulaanbaatar | ‍–‍66 kg |
| Bronze medal – third place | 2015 Tashkent | ‍–‍66 kg |
| Bronze medal – third place | 2016 Tashkent | ‍–‍66 kg |
| Bronze medal – third place | 2016 Qingdao | ‍–‍66 kg |
| Bronze medal – third place | 2017 Tashkent | ‍–‍66 kg |
Asian Junior Championships
| Silver medal – second place | 2007 Hyderabad | ‍–‍60 kg |

Profile at external databases
- IJF: 5830
- JudoInside.com: 49486
- Updated on 20 November 2022

Dovdony Altansükh (Mongolian: Довдоны Алтансүх, born 6 January 1988) is a Mongolian judoka.

Dovdony is a bronze medalist from the 2018 Judo World Masters in the ‍–‍66 kg category.
