= 2016 Judo Grand Prix Qingdao =

Judo competition

Judo 2016 Judo Grand Prix Qingdao
- Venue: Guoxin Gymnasium
- Location: Qingdao, China
- Dates: 18–20 November 2016
- Competitors: 153 from 15 nations

Competition at external databases
- Links: IJF • EJU • JudoInside

The 2016 Judo Grand Prix Qingdao was held at the Guoxin Gymnasium in Qingdao, China, from 18 to 20 November 2016.

== Medal summary ==
=== Men's events ===
Event	Gold	Silver	Bronze
Extra-lightweight (−60 kg)	Dashdavaagiin Amartüvshin (MGL)	Islam Yashuev (RUS)	Sayan Khertek (RUS)
Extra-lightweight (−60 kg)	Dashdavaagiin Amartüvshin (MGL)	Islam Yashuev (RUS)	Yang Yung-wei (TPE)
Half-lightweight (−66 kg)	Abdula Abdulzhalilov (RUS)	Anzaur Ardanov (RUS)	Kenzo Tagawa (JPN)
Half-lightweight (−66 kg)	Abdula Abdulzhalilov (RUS)	Anzaur Ardanov (RUS)	Dovdony Altansükh (MGL)
Lightweight (−73 kg)	Uali Kurzhev (RUS)	Sai Yinjirigala (CHN)	Nobuyasu Takeuchi (JPN)
Lightweight (−73 kg)	Uali Kurzhev (RUS)	Sai Yinjirigala (CHN)	Lee Young-jun (KOR)
Half-middleweight (−81 kg)	Lee Jae-hyung (KOR)	Nicholas Delpopolo (USA)	Étienne Briand (CAN)
Half-middleweight (−81 kg)	Lee Jae-hyung (KOR)	Nicholas Delpopolo (USA)	Nyamsürengiin Dagvasüren (MGL)
Middleweight (−90 kg)	Max Stewart (GBR)	Gantulgyn Altanbagana (MGL)	Chan Je-on (KOR)
Middleweight (−90 kg)	Max Stewart (GBR)	Gantulgyn Altanbagana (MGL)	Said Emi Zhambekov (RUS)
Half-heavyweight (−100 kg)	Kirill Denisov (RUS)	Tsogtgerel Khutag (MGL)	Hu Mingchao (CHN)
Half-heavyweight (−100 kg)	Kirill Denisov (RUS)	Tsogtgerel Khutag (MGL)	Maksud Ibragimov (RUS)
Heavyweight (+100 kg)	Yusei Ogawa (JPN)	Anton Krivobokov (RUS)	Ölziibayaryn Düürenbayar (MGL)
Heavyweight (+100 kg)	Yusei Ogawa (JPN)	Anton Krivobokov (RUS)	Andrey Volkov (RUS)

=== Women's events ===
Event	Gold	Silver	Bronze
Extra-lightweight (−48 kg)	Li Yanan (CHN)	Mariia Persidskaia (RUS)	Guan Xiaoxian (CHN)
Extra-lightweight (−48 kg)	Li Yanan (CHN)	Mariia Persidskaia (RUS)	Yin Lingling (CHN)
Half-lightweight (−52 kg)	Chen Chen (CHN)	Galiya Sagitova (RUS)	Chen Wei (CHN)
Half-lightweight (−52 kg)	Chen Chen (CHN)	Galiya Sagitova (RUS)	Chen Chin-ying (TPE)
Lightweight (−57 kg)	Anastasia Konkina (RUS)	Lin Yuanyuan (CHN)	Feng Xuemei (CHN)
Lightweight (−57 kg)	Anastasia Konkina (RUS)	Lin Yuanyuan (CHN)	Anzu Yamamoto (JPN)
Half-middleweight (−63 kg)	Nami Nabekura (JPN)	Lucy Renshall (GBR)	Myung Ji-Hye (KOR)
Half-middleweight (−63 kg)	Nami Nabekura (JPN)	Lucy Renshall (GBR)	Tsedevsürengiin Mönkhzayaa (MGL)
Middleweight (−70 kg)	Erina Ike (JPN)	Hwang Ye-sul (KOR)	Chen Fei (CHN)
Middleweight (−70 kg)	Erina Ike (JPN)	Hwang Ye-sul (KOR)	Katie-Jemima Yeats-Brown (GBR)
Half-heavyweight (−78 kg)	Rika Takayama (JPN)	Zhang Kaili (CHN)	Anastasiya Dmitrieva (RUS)
Half-heavyweight (−78 kg)	Rika Takayama (JPN)	Zhang Kaili (CHN)	Ma Zhenzhao (CHN)
Heavyweight (+78 kg)	Yu Song (CHN)	Ma Sisi (CHN)	Kang Jie (CHN)
Heavyweight (+78 kg)	Yu Song (CHN)	Ma Sisi (CHN)	Lee Eun-ju (KOR)

Source Results

=== Medal table ===
* Host nation (China)

Rank	Nation	Gold	Silver	Bronze	Total
1	Russia (RUS)	4	5	5	14
2	Japan (JPN)	4	0	3	7
3	China (CHN)*	3	4	8	15
4	Mongolia (MGL)	1	2	4	7
5	South Korea (KOR)	1	1	4	6
6	Great Britain (GBR)	1	1	1	3
7	United States (USA)	0	1	0	1
8	Chinese Taipei (TPE)	0	0	2	2
9	Canada (CAN)	0	0	1	1
Totals (9 entries)		14	14	28	56
