= Dashdavaagiin Amartüvshin =

Mongolian judoka (born 1987)

Amartuvshin Dashdavaa
Personal information
- Native name: Дашдаваа Амартүвшин
- Full name: Amartuvshin Dashdavaa
- Nationality: Mongolian
- Born: 15 December 1987 (age 38) Mongolia
- Occupation: Judoka
- Height: 165 cm (5 ft 5 in)

Sport
- Country: Mongolia
- Sport: Judo
- Weight class: –60 kg

Achievements and titles
- Olympic Games: R32 (2020)
- World Champ.: (silver) (2013)
- Asian Champ.: 7th (2018)
- National finals: (gold) (2010)
Medal record
Men's judo
Representing Mongolia
World Championships
Silver medal – second place	2013 Rio de Janeiro	‍–‍60 kg
World Masters
Bronze medal – third place	2016 Guadalajara	‍–‍60 kg
Bronze medal – third place	2017 Saint Petersburg	‍–‍60 kg
Bronze medal – third place	2018 Guangzhou	‍–‍60 kg
IJF Grand Slam
Gold medal – first place	2013 Baku	‍–‍60 kg
Silver medal – second place	2014 Abu Dhabi	‍–‍60 kg
Silver medal – second place	2017 Tokyo	‍–‍60 kg
Bronze medal – third place	2010 Moscow	‍–‍60 kg
Bronze medal – third place	2015 Paris	‍–‍60 kg
Bronze medal – third place	2019 Paris	‍–‍60 kg
Bronze medal – third place	2019 Baku	‍–‍60 kg
Bronze medal – third place	2020 Paris	‍–‍60 kg
IJF Grand Prix
Gold medal – first place	2013 Samsun	‍–‍60 kg
Gold medal – first place	2014 Tashkent	‍–‍60 kg
Gold medal – first place	2015 Ulaanbaatar	‍–‍60 kg
Gold medal – first place	2016 Ulaanbaatar	‍–‍60 kg
Gold medal – first place	2016 Qingdao	‍–‍60 kg
Gold medal – first place	2018 The Hague	‍–‍60 kg
Silver medal – second place	2012 Qingdao	‍–‍60 kg
Silver medal – second place	2013 Ulaanbaatar	‍–‍60 kg
Silver medal – second place	2014 Astana	‍–‍60 kg
Silver medal – second place	2016 Tbilisi	‍–‍60 kg
Silver medal – second place	2017 Hohhot	‍–‍60 kg
Bronze medal – third place	2012 Abu Dhabi	‍–‍60 kg
Bronze medal – third place	2014 Jeju	‍–‍60 kg
Bronze medal – third place	2015 Tbilisi	‍–‍60 kg
Bronze medal – third place	2017 Düsseldorf	‍–‍60 kg
Bronze medal – third place	2017 The Hague	‍–‍60 kg
Bronze medal – third place	2018 Hohhot	‍–‍60 kg
Men's Sambo
World Championships
Bronze medal – third place	2011 Vilnius	‍–‍62 kg

Profile at external databases
- IJF: 2736
- JudoInside.com: 69369
- Updated on 5 July 2023

Dashdavaagiin Amartüvshin (Mongolian: Дашдаваагийн Амартүвшин) is a male Mongolian judoka. He won the silver medal in the extra-lightweight division (‍–‍60 kg) at the 2013 World Judo Championships.
