= 2015 World Judo Juniors Championships =

Judo competition

Judo 2015 World Judo Juniors Championships
- Location: Abu Dhabi, United Arab Emirates
- Dates: 23–27 October 2015
- Competitors: 555 from 81 nations

Champions
- Men's team: Japan (2nd title)
- Women's team: Japan (3rd title)

Competition at external databases
- Links: IJF • JudoInside

The 2015 World Judo Juniors Championships was an edition of the World Judo Juniors Championships, organised by the International Judo Federation. It was held in Abu Dhabi, United Arab Emirates from 23 to 27 October 2015. The final day of competition featured men's and women's team events, both won by team Japan.

== Medal summary ==
=== Men's events ===
Event	Gold	Silver	Bronze
−55 kg	Magzhan Shamshadin (KAZ)	Lee Ha-rim (KOR)	Amartuvshin Bayaraa (MGL)
−55 kg	Magzhan Shamshadin (KAZ)	Lee Ha-rim (KOR)	Irakli Kupatadze (GEO)
−60 kg	Ryuju Nagayama (JPN)	Tsend-Ochiryn Tsogtbaatar (MGL)	Walide Khyar (FRA)
−60 kg	Ryuju Nagayama (JPN)	Tsend-Ochiryn Tsogtbaatar (MGL)	Kim Chann-yeong (KOR)
−66 kg	Masaya Asari (JPN)	Alberto Gaitero (ESP)	Daniel Cargnin (BRA)
−66 kg	Masaya Asari (JPN)	Alberto Gaitero (ESP)	Hidayat Heydarov (AZE)
−73 kg	Kang Heon-cheol (KOR)	Tamazi Kirakozashvili (GEO)	Lincoln Neves (BRA)
−73 kg	Kang Heon-cheol (KOR)	Tamazi Kirakozashvili (GEO)	Martin Hojak (SLO)
−81 kg	Frank de Wit (NED)	Sotaro Fujiwara (JPN)	Viktor Makukha (UKR)
−81 kg	Frank de Wit (NED)	Sotaro Fujiwara (JPN)	Iván Felipe Silva Morales (CUB)
−90 kg	Beka Gviniashvili (GEO)	Nikoloz Sherazadishvili (ESP)	Piotr Kuczera (POL)
−90 kg	Beka Gviniashvili (GEO)	Nikoloz Sherazadishvili (ESP)	Firudin Dadashov (AZE)
−100 kg	Niyaz Ilyasov (RUS)	Leonardo Gonçalves (BRA)	Nikita Azarov (KAZ)
−100 kg	Niyaz Ilyasov (RUS)	Leonardo Gonçalves (BRA)	Anton Savytskiy (UKR)
+100 kg	Tamerlan Bashaev (RUS)	Genta Tanaka (JPN)	Yusei Ogawa (JPN)
+100 kg	Tamerlan Bashaev (RUS)	Genta Tanaka (JPN)	Messie Katanga (FRA)
Team	Japan	Georgia	Belarus
Team	Japan	Georgia	Russia

=== Women's events ===
Event	Gold	Silver	Bronze
−44 kg	Lee Hye-kyeong (KOR)	Riko Igarashi (JPN)	Ganbaataryn Narantsetseg (MGL)
−44 kg	Lee Hye-kyeong (KOR)	Riko Igarashi (JPN)	Rita Reis (BRA)
−48 kg	Funa Tonaki (JPN)	Maruša Štangar (SLO)	Mikoto Tsunemi (JPN)
−48 kg	Funa Tonaki (JPN)	Maruša Štangar (SLO)	Sephora Corcher (FRA)
−52 kg	Distria Krasniqi (KOS)	Mariam Janashvili (GEO)	Astride Gneto (FRA)
−52 kg	Distria Krasniqi (KOS)	Mariam Janashvili (GEO)	Mariana Esteves (POR)
−57 kg	Haruka Funakubo (JPN)	Stefania Adelina Dobre (ROU)	Andreja Leški (SLO)
−57 kg	Haruka Funakubo (JPN)	Stefania Adelina Dobre (ROU)	Sarah Harachi (FRA)
−63 kg	Nami Nabekura (JPN)	Diana Dzhigaros (RUS)	Lucy Renshall (GBR)
−63 kg	Nami Nabekura (JPN)	Diana Dzhigaros (RUS)	Lara Reimann (GER)
−70 kg	Szabina Gercsák (HUN)	Remi Aoyagi (JPN)	Lisa Dollinger (GER)
−70 kg	Szabina Gercsák (HUN)	Remi Aoyagi (JPN)	Natascha Ausma (NED)
−78 kg	Brigita Matić-Ljuba (CRO)	Klara Apotekar (SLO)	Julie Hölterhoff (GER)
−78 kg	Brigita Matić-Ljuba (CRO)	Klara Apotekar (SLO)	Anna-Maria Wagner (GER)
+78 kg	Wakaba Tomita (JPN)	Camila Yamakawa (BRA)	Yelyzaveta Kalanina (UKR)
+78 kg	Wakaba Tomita (JPN)	Camila Yamakawa (BRA)	Han Mi-jin (KOR)
Team	Japan	France	Germany
Team	Japan	France	Netherlands

Source Results

=== Medal table ===
* Host nation (United Arab Emirates)

Rank	Nation	Gold	Silver	Bronze	Total
1	Japan (JPN)	6	4	2	12
2	South Korea (KOR)	2	1	2	5
3	Russia (RUS)	2	1	0	3
4	Georgia (GEO)	1	2	1	4
5	Kazakhstan (KAZ)	1	0	1	2
5	Netherlands (NED)	1	0	1	2
7	Croatia (CRO)	1	0	0	1
7	Hungary (HUN)	1	0	0	1
7	Kosovo (KOS)	1	0	0	1
10	Brazil (BRA)	0	2	3	5
11	Slovenia (SLO)	0	2	2	4
12	Spain (ESP)	0	2	0	2
13	Mongolia (MGL)	0	1	2	3
14	Romania (ROU)	0	1	0	1
15	France (FRA)	0	0	5	5
16	Germany (GER)	0	0	4	4
17	Ukraine (UKR)	0	0	3	3
18	Azerbaijan (AZE)	0	0	2	2
19	Cuba (CUB)	0	0	1	1
19	Great Britain (GBR)	0	0	1	1
19	Poland (POL)	0	0	1	1
19	Portugal (POR)	0	0	1	1
Totals (22 entries)		16	16	32	64
