= Amartuvshin Bayaraa =

Mongolian judoka (born 1996)

Personal information
- Native name: Баяраагийн Амартүвшин
- Born: 26 December 1996 (age 29)
- Occupation: Judoka
- Height: 165 cm (5 ft 5 in)

Sport
- Country: Mongolia
- Sport: Judo
- Weight class: –60 kg

Achievements and titles
- World Champ.: R64 (2018)
Medal record
Men's judo
Representing Mongolia
IJF Grand Prix
Bronze medal – third place	2017 Antalya	–60 kg
Bronze medal – third place	2017 The Hague	–60 kg
World Juniors Championships
Bronze medal – third place	2014 Fort Lauderdale	–55 kg
Bronze medal – third place	2015 Abu Dhabi	–55 kg
Asian Junior Championships
Gold medal – first place	2014 Hong Kong	–55 kg
World Cadets Championships
Bronze medal – third place	2013 Miami	–50 kg

Profile at external databases
- IJF: 13852
- JudoInside.com: 35182
- Updated on 6 December 2022

Amartuvshin Bayaraa (born 26 December 1996) is a Mongolian judoka.

He is the bronze medallist of the 2017 Judo Grand Prix The Hague in the -60 kg category.
