= Gili Cohen =

Israeli judoka (born 1991)

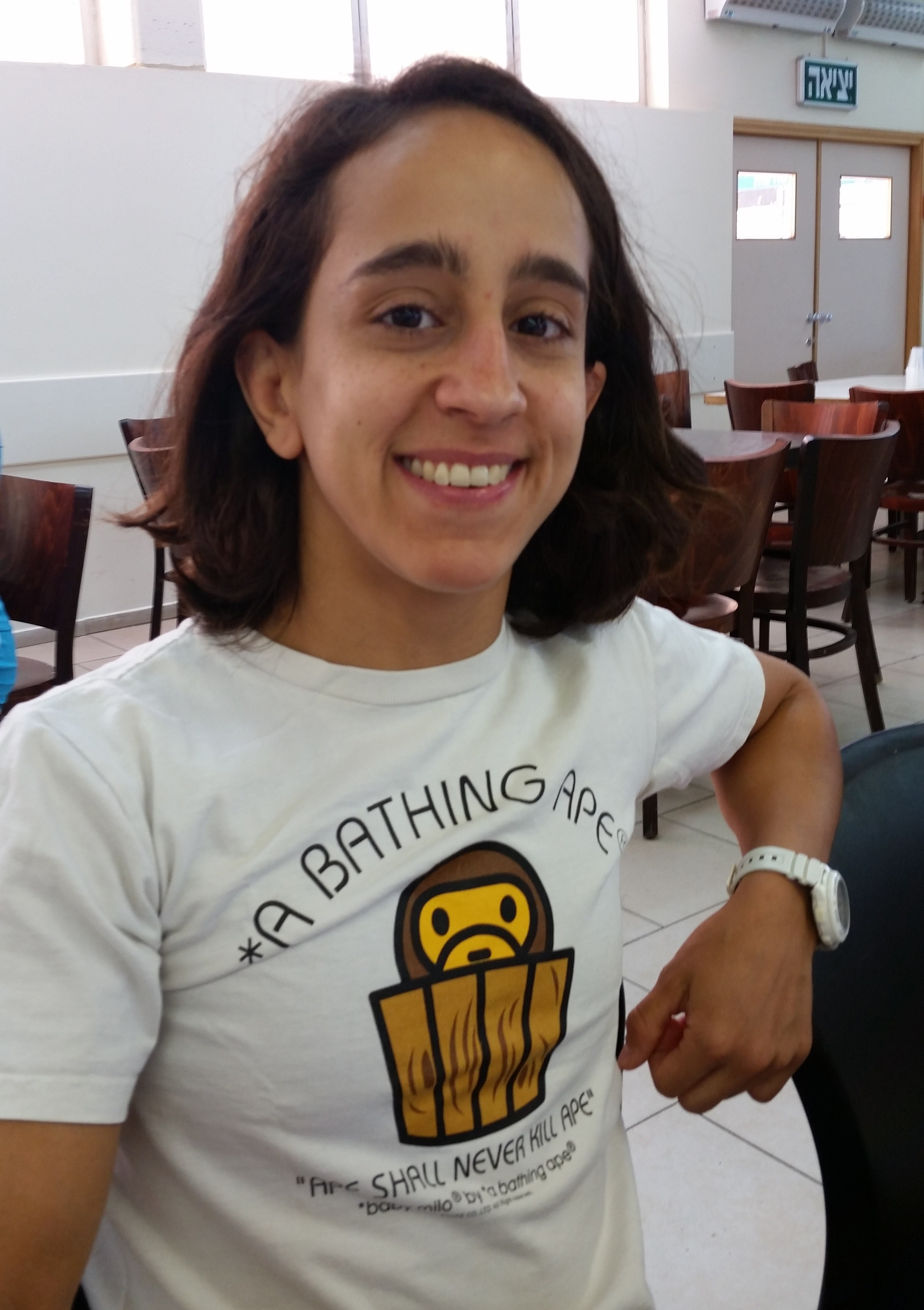
- Cohen in 2016

Personal information
- Native name: גילי כהן
- Born: June 19, 1991 (age 35)
- Occupation: Judoka
- Height: 1.60 m (5 ft 3 in)

Sport
- Country: Israel
- Sport: Judo
- Weight class: –52 kg
- Rank: 6th dan black belt
- Retired: 24 August 2021

Achievements and titles
- Olympic Games: R16 (2016, 2020)
- World Champ.: 5th (2017)
- European Champ.: (bronze) (2014)
Medal record
Women's judo
Representing Israel
European Championships
Bronze medal – third place	2014 Montpellier	‍–‍52 kg
IJF Grand Slam
Gold medal – first place	2016 Baku	‍–‍52 kg
Gold medal – first place	2019 Ekaterinburg	‍–‍52 kg
Silver medal – second place	2021 Tel Aviv	‍–‍52 kg
Bronze medal – third place	2013 Moscow	‍–‍52 kg
Bronze medal – third place	2017 Abu Dhabi	‍–‍52 kg
Bronze medal – third place	2018 Abu Dhabi	‍–‍52 kg
Bronze medal – third place	2021 Antalya	‍–‍52 kg
IJF Grand Prix
Gold medal – first place	2014 Tbilisi	‍–‍52 kg
Silver medal – second place	2013 Almaty	‍–‍52 kg
Silver medal – second place	2013 Tashkent	‍–‍52 kg
Silver medal – second place	2016 Tbilisi	‍–‍52 kg
Silver medal – second place	2016 Almaty	‍–‍52 kg
Silver medal – second place	2017 Antalya	‍–‍52 kg
Silver medal – second place	2019 Tel Aviv	‍–‍52 kg
Silver medal – second place	2019 Tbilisi	‍–‍52 kg
Bronze medal – third place	2014 Havana	‍–‍52 kg
Bronze medal – third place	2014 Zagreb	‍–‍52 kg
Bronze medal – third place	2014 Astana	‍–‍52 kg
Bronze medal – third place	2014 Jeju	‍–‍52 kg
Bronze medal – third place	2015 Tashkent	‍–‍52 kg
Bronze medal – third place	2016 Samsun	‍–‍52 kg
European U23 Championships
Silver medal – second place	2013 Samokov	‍–‍52 kg
Maccabiah Games
Gold medal – first place	2017 Israel	‍–‍57 kg
Bronze medal – third place	2009 Israel	‍–‍57 kg

Profile at external databases
- IJF: 3908
- JudoInside.com: 47029
- Updated on 4 May 2025

Gili Cohen (Hebrew: גילי כהן; born June 19, 1991) is an Israeli retired Olympic judoka. In 2013, she won the silver medal at the European U23 Championships, and she was a bronze medalist at the 2014 European Judo Championships. She competed for Israel at the 2020 Summer Olympics.

== Judo career ==
Cohen has been Israeli judo champion in the ‍–‍52 kg category seven times in a row - from 2011 through to 2017. She won a bronze medal in the 2009 Maccabiah Games.

Cohen won the silver medal at the 2013 European U23 Championships. She won the bronze medal at the 2013 Moscow Grand Slam, and the gold medal at the 2014 Tbilisi Grand Prix. She was the bronze medalist at the 2014 European Championships in Montpellier.

Cohen won the gold medal at the 2016 Baku Grand Slam, beating Asian Championships silver medalist Ma Yingnan of China in the semi-final and defeating world number 12 Odette Giuffrida of Italy in the final. She also won the bronze medals at the 2016 Samsun Grand Prix and the 2016 Almaty Grand Prix.

Cohen competed for Israel at the 2016 Summer Olympics, while she was ranked 9th in the world judo ranking. She lost to Christianne Legentil of Mauritius in the women's 52 kg tournament.

Cohen won the silver medal at the 2017 Antalya Grand Prix in the women's 52 kg in April of that year.

At the 2017 Maccabiah Games, Cohen won the gold medal in the ‍–‍52 kg judo event.

Cohen won the silver medal in her event at the 2021 Tel Aviv Grand Slam. later that year, Cohen won a bronze medal in her event at the 2021 Antalya Grand Slam.

After a long contest with Gefen Primo, Cohen was chosen to represent Israel at the 2020 Summer Olympics in the women's 52 kg weight category.
In her first match, Cohen beat Turkmenistan's Gülbadam Babamuratowa by ippon. At the round of 16, She lost to Belgian two-time European champion Charline Van Snick, ending her part in the individual competition.

== Titles ==
Year	Tournament	Place	Ref.
2013	Grand Slam Moscow	3rd place, bronze medalist(s)	
2013	Grand Prix Almaty	2nd place, silver medalist(s)	
2013	Grand Prix Tashkent	2nd place, silver medalist(s)	
2014	Grand Prix Tbilisi	1st place, gold medalist(s)	
2014	European Championships	3rd place, bronze medalist(s)	
2014	Grand Prix Havana	3rd place, bronze medalist(s)	
2014	Grand Prix Zagreb	3rd place, bronze medalist(s)	
2014	Grand Prix Astana	3rd place, bronze medalist(s)	
2014	Grand Prix Jeju	3rd place, bronze medalist(s)	
2015	Grand Prix Tashkent	3rd place, bronze medalist(s)	
2016	Grand Prix Tbilisi	2nd place, silver medalist(s)	
2016	Grand Prix Samsun	3rd place, bronze medalist(s)	
2016	Grand Slam Baku	1st place, gold medalist(s)	
2016	Grand Prix Almaty	2nd place, silver medalist(s)	
2017	Grand Prix Antalya	2nd place, silver medalist(s)	
2017	Grand Slam Abu Dhabi	3rd place, bronze medalist(s)	
2018	Grand Slam Abu Dhabi	3rd place, bronze medalist(s)	
2019	Grand Prix Tel Aviv	2nd place, silver medalist(s)	
2019	Grand Slam Ekaterinburg	1st place, gold medalist(s)	
2019	Grand Prix Tbilisi	2nd place, silver medalist(s)	
2021	Grand Slam Tel Aviv	2nd place, silver medalist(s)	
2021	Grand Slam Antalya	3rd place, bronze medalist(s)	
