= 2014 Judo Grand Prix Havana =

Judo competition

Judo 2014 Judo Grand Prix Havana
- Location: Havana, Cuba
- Dates: 6–8 June 2014
- Competitors: 293 from 39 nations

Competition at external databases
- Links: IJF • JudoInside

The 2014 Judo Grand Prix Havana was held in Havana, Cuba from 6 to 8 June 2014.

== Medal summary ==
=== Men's events ===
Event	Gold	Silver	Bronze
Extra-lightweight (−60 kg)	Amiran Papinashvili (GEO)	Eric Takabatake (BRA)	Ludovic Chammartin (SUI)
Extra-lightweight (−60 kg)	Amiran Papinashvili (GEO)	Eric Takabatake (BRA)	Ashley McKenzie (GBR)
Half-lightweight (−66 kg)	Mikhail Pulyaev (RUS)	Sugoi Uriarte (ESP)	Alim Gadanov (RUS)
Half-lightweight (−66 kg)	Mikhail Pulyaev (RUS)	Sugoi Uriarte (ESP)	Patrick Gagné (CAN)
Lightweight (−73 kg)	Sagi Muki (ISR)	Magdiel Estrada (CUB)	Musa Mogushkov (RUS)
Lightweight (−73 kg)	Sagi Muki (ISR)	Magdiel Estrada (CUB)	Nugzar Tatalashvili (GEO)
Half-middleweight (−81 kg)	Avtandili Tchrikishvili (GEO)	Travis Stevens (USA)	Murat Khabachirov (RUS)
Half-middleweight (−81 kg)	Avtandili Tchrikishvili (GEO)	Travis Stevens (USA)	Antoine Valois-Fortier (CAN)
Middleweight (−90 kg)	Varlam Liparteliani (GEO)	Tiago Camilo (BRA)	Beka Gviniashvili (GEO)
Middleweight (−90 kg)	Varlam Liparteliani (GEO)	Tiago Camilo (BRA)	Kirill Voprosov (RUS)
Half-heavyweight (−100 kg)	Toma Nikiforov (BEL)	Flavio Orlik (SUI)	Adlan Bisultanov (RUS)
Half-heavyweight (−100 kg)	Toma Nikiforov (BEL)	Flavio Orlik (SUI)	Hugo Pessanha (BRA)
Heavyweight (+100 kg)	Renat Saidov (RUS)	Chris Sherrington (GBR)	Barna Bor (HUN)
Heavyweight (+100 kg)	Renat Saidov (RUS)	Chris Sherrington (GBR)	Óscar Brayson (CUB)

=== Women's events ===
Event	Gold	Silver	Bronze
Extra-lightweight (−48 kg)	Maria Celia Laborde (CUB)	Dayaris Mestre Álvarez (CUB)	Julia Figueroa (ESP)
Extra-lightweight (−48 kg)	Maria Celia Laborde (CUB)	Dayaris Mestre Álvarez (CUB)	Sarah Menezes (BRA)
Half-lightweight (−52 kg)	Yanet Bermoy (CUB)	Érika Miranda (BRA)	Gili Cohen (ISR)
Half-lightweight (−52 kg)	Yanet Bermoy (CUB)	Érika Miranda (BRA)	Mareen Kräh (GER)
Lightweight (−57 kg)	Automne Pavia (FRA)	Sabrina Filzmoser (AUT)	Hedvig Karakas (HUN)
Lightweight (−57 kg)	Automne Pavia (FRA)	Sabrina Filzmoser (AUT)	Aliuska Ojeda (CUB)
Half-middleweight (−63 kg)	Clarisse Agbegnenou (FRA)	Anne-Laure Bellard (FRA)	Maricet Espinosa (CUB)
Half-middleweight (−63 kg)	Clarisse Agbegnenou (FRA)	Anne-Laure Bellard (FRA)	Martyna Trajdos (GER)
Middleweight (−70 kg)	Laura Vargas Koch (GER)	Bernadette Graf (AUT)	Barbara Matić (CRO)
Middleweight (−70 kg)	Laura Vargas Koch (GER)	Bernadette Graf (AUT)	Kelita Zupancic (CAN)
Half-heavyweight (−78 kg)	Kayla Harrison (USA)	Audrey Tcheuméo (FRA)	Yalennis Castillo (CUB)
Half-heavyweight (−78 kg)	Kayla Harrison (USA)	Audrey Tcheuméo (FRA)	Luise Malzahn (GER)
Heavyweight (+78 kg)	Ma Sisi (CHN)	Franziska Konitz (GER)	Émilie Andéol (FRA)
Heavyweight (+78 kg)	Ma Sisi (CHN)	Franziska Konitz (GER)	Ksenia Chibisova (RUS)

Source Results

=== Medal table ===
* Host nation (Cuba)

Rank	Nation	Gold	Silver	Bronze	Total
1	Georgia (GEO)	3	0	2	5
2	Cuba (CUB)*	2	2	4	8
3	France (FRA)	2	2	1	5
4	Russia (RUS)	2	0	6	8
5	Germany (GER)	1	1	3	5
6	United States (USA)	1	1	0	2
7	Israel (ISR)	1	0	1	2
8	Belgium (BEL)	1	0	0	1
8	China (CHN)	1	0	0	1
10	Brazil (BRA)	0	3	2	5
11	Austria (AUT)	0	2	0	2
12	Great Britain (GBR)	0	1	1	2
12	Spain (ESP)	0	1	1	2
12	Switzerland (SUI)	0	1	1	2
15	Canada (CAN)	0	0	3	3
16	Hungary (HUN)	0	0	2	2
17	Croatia (CRO)	0	0	1	1
Totals (17 entries)		14	14	28	56
