= Nyamsürengiin Dagvasüren =

Mongolian judoka (born 1990)

Personal information
- Born: 22 January 1990 (age 36)
- Occupation: Judoka

Sport
- Country: Mongolia
- Sport: Judo
- Weight class: ‍–‍81 kg

Achievements and titles
- Asian Champ.: (gold) (2016)
Medal record
Men's judo
Representing Mongolia
World Championships
Bronze medal – third place	2015 Astana	Men's team
Asian Games
Bronze medal – third place	2014 Incheon	‍–‍81 kg
Asian Championships
Gold medal – first place	2016 Tashkent	‍–‍81 kg
IJF Grand Slam
Bronze medal – third place	2017 Tokyo	‍–‍81 kg
IJF Grand Prix
Gold medal – first place	2016 Ulaanbaatar	‍–‍81 kg
Silver medal – second place	2017 Tashkent	‍–‍81 kg
Silver medal – second place	2018 Tashkent	‍–‍81 kg
Bronze medal – third place	2014 Jeju	‍–‍81 kg
Bronze medal – third place	2015 Tbilisi	‍–‍81 kg
Bronze medal – third place	2015 Ulaanbaatar	‍–‍81 kg
Bronze medal – third place	2016 Almaty	‍–‍81 kg
Bronze medal – third place	2016 Qingdao	‍–‍81 kg
Bronze medal – third place	2017 Antalya	‍–‍81 kg

Profile at external databases
- IJF: 9996
- JudoInside.com: 69784
- Updated on 26 November 2022

Nyamsürengiin Dagvasüren (born 22 January 1990) is a Mongolian judoka.

Nyamsürengiin is a bronze medalist from the 2017 Judo Grand Slam Tokyo in the ‍–‍81 kg category.
