= 2018 European Judo Championships – Men's 81 kg =

Judo competition

Judo Men's 81 kg at the 2018 European Judo Championships
- Venue: Expo Tel Aviv
- Location: Tel Aviv, Israel
- Date: 27 April

Medalists
gold medal	Sagi Muki (1st title)	Israel
silver medal	Sami Chouchi	Belgium
bronze medal	Aslan Lappinagov	Russia
bronze medal	Antonio Esposito	Italy

Competition at external databases
- Links: IJF • JudoInside

The men's 81 kg competition at the 2018 European Judo Championships was held on 28 April at the Expo Tel Aviv.

== Results ==
=== Finals ===
Semi-finals
Sami Chouchi (BEL)	10
Antonio Esposito (ITA)	00
Aslan Lappinagov (RUS)	00
Sagi Muki (ISR)	10

Final
Sami Chouchi (BEL)	00
Sagi Muki (ISR)	01

=== Repechage ===
Repechage
Alpha Oumar Djalo (FRA)	00
Anri Egutidze (POR)	10

Third place
Anri Egutidze (POR)	00
Aslan Lappinagov (RUS)	10

Repechage
İlker Güldüren (TUR)	01
László Csoknyai (HUN)	00

Third place
İlker Güldüren (TUR)	00
Antonio Esposito (ITA)	10

=== Pool A ===
First round

Round of 32
Frank de Wit (NED)	10
Nicon Zaborosciuc (MDA)	00
Logi Haraldsson (ISL)	00
Sami Chouchi (BEL)	10
Dominik Družeta (CRO)	10
Jaromír Musil (CZE)	00
Alpha Oumar Djalo (FRA)	01
Stuart McWatt (GBR)	00

Round of 16
Frank de Wit (NED)	00
Sami Chouchi (BEL)	11
Dominik Družeta (CRO)	00
Alpha Oumar Djalo (FRA)	10

Quarterfinals
Sami Chouchi (BEL)	10
Alpha Oumar Djalo (FRA)	00

=== Pool B ===
First round

Round of 32
Anri Egutidze (POR)	10
Phedias Konnaris (CYP)	00
Robin Pacek (SWE)	00
Arso Milić (MNE)	10
Vedat Albayrak (TUR)	10
Artūras Maiboroda (LTU)	00
Vartan Khachatryan (ARM)	00
Antonio Esposito (ITA)	01

Round of 16
Anri Egutidze (POR)	10
Arso Milić (MNE)	00
Vedat Albayrak (TUR)	00
Antonio Esposito (ITA)	10

Quarterfinals
Anri Egutidze (POR)	00
Antonio Esposito (ITA)	01

=== Pool C ===
First round
Srđan Mrvaljević (MNE)	00
Nugzar Tatalashvili (GEO)	10

Round of 32
Aslan Lappinagov (RUS)	01
Sergii Krivchach (UKR)	00
Alexios Ntanatsidis (GRE)	10
Aristos Michael (CYP)	00
Ivaylo Ivanov (BUL)	10
Nugzar Tatalashvili (GEO)	01
İlker Güldüren (TUR)	01
Dorin Gotonoaga (MDA)	00

Round of 16
Aslan Lappinagov (RUS)	01
Alexios Ntanatsidis (GRE)	00
Ivaylo Ivanov (BUL)	00
İlker Güldüren (TUR)	10

Quarterfinals
Aslan Lappinagov (RUS)	10
İlker Güldüren (TUR)	00

=== Pool D ===
First round

Round of 32
Matthias Casse (BEL)	10
Christian Parlati (ITA)	00
Sagi Muki (ISR)	10
Jonathan Allardon (FRA)	00
László Csoknyai (HUN)	10
Damian Szwarnowiecki (POL)	00
Kristjan Toniste (EST)	01
Elemer Szocs (ROU)	00

Round of 16
Matthias Casse (BEL)	00
Sagi Muki (ISR)	01
László Csoknyai (HUN)	10
Kristjan Toniste (EST)	00

Quarterfinals
Sagi Muki (ISR)	10
László Csoknyai (HUN)	00
