= 2014 Judo Grand Prix Jeju =

Judo competition

Judo 2014 Judo Grand Prix Jeju
- Location: Jeju City, South Korea
- Dates: 27–29 November 2014
- Competitors: 275 from 42 nations

Competition at external databases
- Links: IJF • EJU • JudoInside

The 2014 Judo Grand Prix Jeju was held in Jeju City, South Korea from 27 to 29 November 2014.

== Medal summary ==
=== Men's events ===
Event	Gold	Silver	Bronze
Extra-lightweight (−60 kg)	Kim Won-jin (KOR)	Ryoya Kawano (JPN)	Dashdavaagiin Amartüvshin (MGL)
Extra-lightweight (−60 kg)	Kim Won-jin (KOR)	Ryoya Kawano (JPN)	Ganboldyn Kherlen (MGL)
Half-lightweight (−66 kg)	Sho Tateyama (JPN)	An Ba-ul (KOR)	Anzaur Ardanov (RUS)
Half-lightweight (−66 kg)	Sho Tateyama (JPN)	An Ba-ul (KOR)	Colin Oates (GBR)
Lightweight (−73 kg)	An Chang-rim (KOR)	Sagi Muki (ISR)	Rustam Orujov (AZE)
Lightweight (−73 kg)	An Chang-rim (KOR)	Sagi Muki (ISR)	Dirk Van Tichelt (BEL)
Half-middleweight (−81 kg)	Kim Jae-bum (KOR)	Joachim Bottieau (BEL)	Wang Ki-chun (KOR)
Half-middleweight (−81 kg)	Kim Jae-bum (KOR)	Joachim Bottieau (BEL)	Nyamsürengiin Dagvasüren (MGL)
Middleweight (−90 kg)	Gwak Dong-han (KOR)	Mammadali Mehdiyev (AZE)	Ramin Gurbanov (AZE)
Middleweight (−90 kg)	Gwak Dong-han (KOR)	Mammadali Mehdiyev (AZE)	Lee Kyu-won (KOR)
Half-heavyweight (−100 kg)	Cho Gu-ham (KOR)	Naidangiin Tüvshinbayar (MGL)	Toma Nikiforov (BEL)
Half-heavyweight (−100 kg)	Cho Gu-ham (KOR)	Naidangiin Tüvshinbayar (MGL)	Dimitri Peters (GER)
Heavyweight (+100 kg)	Teddy Riner (FRA)	Kim Sung-min (KOR)	Maciej Sarnacki (POL)
Heavyweight (+100 kg)	Teddy Riner (FRA)	Kim Sung-min (KOR)	Vlăduț Simionescu (ROU)

=== Women's events ===
Event	Gold	Silver	Bronze
Extra-lightweight (−48 kg)	Amandine Buchard (FRA)	Maryna Cherniak (UKR)	Jeong Bo-kyeong (KOR)
Extra-lightweight (−48 kg)	Amandine Buchard (FRA)	Maryna Cherniak (UKR)	Shira Rishony (ISR)
Half-lightweight (−52 kg)	Andreea Chițu (ROU)	Ai Shishime (JPN)	Gili Cohen (ISR)
Half-lightweight (−52 kg)	Andreea Chițu (ROU)	Ai Shishime (JPN)	Laura Gómez (ESP)
Lightweight (−57 kg)	Automne Pavia (FRA)	Hélène Receveaux (FRA)	Vlora Beđeti (SLO)
Lightweight (−57 kg)	Automne Pavia (FRA)	Hélène Receveaux (FRA)	Ivelina Ilieva (BUL)
Half-middleweight (−63 kg)	Clarisse Agbegnenou (FRA)	Isabel Puche (ESP)	Nadja Bazynski (GER)
Half-middleweight (−63 kg)	Clarisse Agbegnenou (FRA)	Isabel Puche (ESP)	Bak Ji-yun (KOR)
Middleweight (−70 kg)	Gévrise Émane (FRA)	Laura Vargas Koch (GER)	Lior Wildikan (ISR)
Middleweight (−70 kg)	Gévrise Émane (FRA)	Laura Vargas Koch (GER)	Assmaa Niang (MAR)
Half-heavyweight (−78 kg)	Audrey Tcheuméo (FRA)	Luise Malzahn (GER)	Kayla Harrison (USA)
Half-heavyweight (−78 kg)	Audrey Tcheuméo (FRA)	Luise Malzahn (GER)	Mi-Young Choi (KOR)
Heavyweight (+78 kg)	Kim Ji-youn (KOR)	Lee Eun-ju (KOR)	Émilie Andéol (FRA)
Heavyweight (+78 kg)	Kim Ji-youn (KOR)	Lee Eun-ju (KOR)	Iryna Kindzerska (UKR)

Source Results

=== Medal table ===
* Host nation (South Korea)

Rank	Nation	Gold	Silver	Bronze	Total
1	South Korea (KOR)*	6	3	5	14
2	France (FRA)	6	1	1	8
3	Japan (JPN)	1	2	0	3
4	Romania (ROU)	1	0	1	2
5	Germany (GER)	0	2	2	4
6	Israel (ISR)	0	1	3	4
6	Mongolia (MGL)	0	1	3	4
8	Azerbaijan (AZE)	0	1	2	3
8	Belgium (BEL)	0	1	2	3
10	Spain (ESP)	0	1	1	2
10	Ukraine (UKR)	0	1	1	2
12	Bulgaria (BUL)	0	0	1	1
12	Great Britain (GBR)	0	0	1	1
12	Morocco (MAR)	0	0	1	1
12	Poland (POL)	0	0	1	1
12	Russia (RUS)	0	0	1	1
12	Slovenia (SLO)	0	0	1	1
12	United States (USA)	0	0	1	1
Totals (18 entries)		14	14	28	56
