= Khadbaatar Narankhuu =

Mongolian judoka (born 1993)

Personal information
- Nationality: Mongolian
- Born: 10 April 1993 (age 33)
- Occupation: Judoka

Sport
- Country: Mongolia
- Sport: Judo
- Weight class: –73 kg
Medal record
Men's judo
Representing Mongolia
IJF Grand Prix
Gold medal – first place	2017 The Hague	–73 kg
Bronze medal – third place	2016 Ulaanbaatar	–73 kg

Profile at external databases
- IJF: 9683
- JudoInside.com: 80328
- Updated on 26 November 2021

Khadbaatar Narankhuu (born 10 April 1993) is a Mongolian judoka.

He is the gold medallist of the 2017 Judo Grand Prix The Hague in the -73 kg category.
