= László Csoknyai =

Hungarian judoka (born 1987)

Personal information
- Born: 25 October 1987 (age 38) Dunaújváros, Hungary
- Occupation: Judoka
- Height: 172 cm (5 ft 8 in)

Sport
- Country: Hungary
- Sport: Judo
- Weight class: ‍–‍81 kg

Achievements and titles
- Olympic Games: R16 (2012)
- World Champ.: 5th (2017)
- European Champ.: 5th (2018)
Medal record
Men's judo
Representing Hungary
IJF Grand Slam
Bronze medal – third place	2011 Paris	‍–‍81 kg
Bronze medal – third place	2015 Abu Dhabi	‍–‍81 kg
IJF Grand Prix
Silver medal – second place	2015 Zagreb	‍–‍81 kg
Silver medal – second place	2016 Zagreb	‍–‍81 kg
Bronze medal – third place	2015 Tashkent	‍–‍81 kg
Bronze medal – third place	2016 Havana	‍–‍81 kg
Bronze medal – third place	2017 Hohhot	‍–‍81 kg
Summer Universiade
Bronze medal – third place	2013 Kazan	‍–‍81 kg
Bronze medal – third place	2013 Kazan	Men's team

Profile at external databases
- IJF: 2214
- JudoInside.com: 29873
- Updated on 24 November 2022

László Csoknyai (born 25 October 1987, in Dunaújváros) is a Hungarian judoka. He competed in the men's 81 kg event at the 2012 Summer Olympics; after defeating Putu Wiradamungga in the second round, he was eliminated by Kim Jae-bum in the third round. He also competed at the 2016 Summer Olympics in the men's 81 kg event, in which he was eliminated by Takanori Nagase in the second round.
