= 2016 Judo Grand Prix Tbilisi =

Judo competition

Judo 2016 Judo Grand Prix Tbilisi
- Venue: Olympic Palace
- Location: Tbilisi, Georgia
- Dates: 25–27 March 2016
- Competitors: 389 from 67 nations

Competition at external databases
- Links: IJF • EJU • JudoInside

The 2016 Judo Grand Prix Tbilisi was held at the Olympic Palace in Tbilisi, Georgia from 25 to 27 March 2016.

== Medal summary ==
=== Men's events ===
Event	Gold	Silver	Bronze
Extra-lightweight (−60 kg)	Diyorbek Urozboev (UZB)	Dashdavaagiin Amartüvshin (MGL)	Ganbatyn Boldbaatar (MGL)
Extra-lightweight (−60 kg)	Diyorbek Urozboev (UZB)	Dashdavaagiin Amartüvshin (MGL)	Amiran Papinashvili (GEO)
Half-lightweight (−66 kg)	Vazha Margvelashvili (GEO)	Fabio Basile (ITA)	Sinan Sandal (TUR)
Half-lightweight (−66 kg)	Vazha Margvelashvili (GEO)	Fabio Basile (ITA)	Zhansay Smagulov (KAZ)
Lightweight (−73 kg)	Nugzar Tatalashvili (GEO)	Ganbaataryn Odbayar (MGL)	Lasha Shavdatuashvili (GEO)
Lightweight (−73 kg)	Nugzar Tatalashvili (GEO)	Ganbaataryn Odbayar (MGL)	Phridon Gigani (GEO)
Half-middleweight (−81 kg)	Alan Khubetsov (RUS)	Levan Gugava (GEO)	Otgonbaataryn Uuganbaatar (MGL)
Half-middleweight (−81 kg)	Alan Khubetsov (RUS)	Levan Gugava (GEO)	Roman Moustopoulos (GRE)
Middleweight (−90 kg)	Noël van 't End (NED)	Marcus Nyman (SWE)	Célio Dias (POR)
Middleweight (−90 kg)	Noël van 't End (NED)	Marcus Nyman (SWE)	Nikoloz Sherazadishvili (ESP)
Half-heavyweight (−100 kg)	Martin Pacek (SWE)	Javad Mahjoub (IRI)	Beka Gviniashvili (GEO)
Half-heavyweight (−100 kg)	Martin Pacek (SWE)	Javad Mahjoub (IRI)	Jorge Fonseca (POR)
Heavyweight (+100 kg)	Or Sasson (ISR)	Roy Meyer (NED)	Rafael Silva (BRA)
Heavyweight (+100 kg)	Or Sasson (ISR)	Roy Meyer (NED)	Maciej Sarnacki (POL)

=== Women's events ===
Event	Gold	Silver	Bronze
Extra-lightweight (−48 kg)	Monica Ungureanu (ROU)	Taciana Lima (GBS)	Maryna Cherniak (UKR)
Extra-lightweight (−48 kg)	Monica Ungureanu (ROU)	Taciana Lima (GBS)	Otgontsetseg Galbadrakh (KAZ)
Half-lightweight (−52 kg)	Odette Giuffrida (ITA)	Gili Cohen (ISR)	Érika Miranda (BRA)
Half-lightweight (−52 kg)	Odette Giuffrida (ITA)	Gili Cohen (ISR)	Kim Mi-ri (KOR)
Lightweight (−57 kg)	Rafaela Silva (BRA)	Nora Gjakova (KOS)	Miryam Roper (GER)
Lightweight (−57 kg)	Rafaela Silva (BRA)	Nora Gjakova (KOS)	Hedvig Karakas (HUN)
Half-middleweight (−63 kg)	Kathrin Unterwurzacher (AUT)	Gemma Howell (GBR)	Edwige Gwend (ITA)
Half-middleweight (−63 kg)	Kathrin Unterwurzacher (AUT)	Gemma Howell (GBR)	Marielle Pruvost (FRA)
Middleweight (−70 kg)	Kim Polling (NED)	Fanny Estelle Posvite (FRA)	Elisavet Teltsidou (GRE)
Middleweight (−70 kg)	Kim Polling (NED)	Fanny Estelle Posvite (FRA)	Assmaa Niang (MAR)
Half-heavyweight (−78 kg)	Marhinde Verkerk (NED)	Guusje Steenhuis (NED)	Natalie Powell (GBR)
Half-heavyweight (−78 kg)	Marhinde Verkerk (NED)	Guusje Steenhuis (NED)	Mayra Aguiar (BRA)
Heavyweight (+78 kg)	Kayra Sayit (TUR)	Maria Suelen Altheman (BRA)	Maryna Slutskaya (BLR)
Heavyweight (+78 kg)	Kayra Sayit (TUR)	Maria Suelen Altheman (BRA)	Ma Sisi (CHN)

Source Results

=== Medal table ===
* Host nation (Georgia)

Rank	Nation	Gold	Silver	Bronze	Total
1	Netherlands (NED)	3	2	0	5
2	Georgia (GEO)*	2	1	4	7
3	Brazil (BRA)	1	1	3	5
4	Italy (ITA)	1	1	1	3
5	Israel (ISR)	1	1	0	2
5	Sweden (SWE)	1	1	0	2
7	Turkey (TUR)	1	0	1	2
8	Austria (AUT)	1	0	0	1
8	Romania (ROU)	1	0	0	1
8	Russia (RUS)	1	0	0	1
8	Uzbekistan (UZB)	1	0	0	1
12	Mongolia (MGL)	0	2	2	4
13	France (FRA)	0	1	1	2
13	Great Britain (GBR)	0	1	1	2
15	Guinea-Bissau (GBS)	0	1	0	1
15	Iran (IRI)	0	1	0	1
15	Kosovo (KOS)	0	1	0	1
18	Greece (GRE)	0	0	2	2
18	Kazakhstan (KAZ)	0	0	2	2
18	Portugal (POR)	0	0	2	2
21	Belarus (BLR)	0	0	1	1
21	China (CHN)	0	0	1	1
21	Germany (GER)	0	0	1	1
21	Hungary (HUN)	0	0	1	1
21	Morocco (MAR)	0	0	1	1
21	Poland (POL)	0	0	1	1
21	South Korea (KOR)	0	0	1	1
21	Spain (ESP)	0	0	1	1
21	Ukraine (UKR)	0	0	1	1
Totals (29 entries)		14	14	28	56
