= Aslan Lappinagov =

Russian judoka (born 1993)

Personal information
- Nationality: Russian
- Born: 9 August 1993 (age 32)
- Occupation: Judoka

Sport
- Country: Russia
- Sport: Judo
- Weight class: –81 kg

Achievements and titles
- World Champ.: R16 (2018, 2021)
- European Champ.: (bronze) (2017, 2018)
Medal record
Men's judo
Representing Russia
European Championships
Bronze medal – third place	2017 Warsaw	‍–‍81 kg
Bronze medal – third place	2018 Tel Aviv	‍–‍81 kg
World Masters
Silver medal – second place	2017 Saint Petersburg	‍–‍81 kg
Silver medal – second place	2018 Guangzhou	‍–‍81 kg
IJF Grand Slam
Gold medal – first place	2016 Tyumen	‍–‍81 kg
Silver medal – second place	2019 Düsseldorf	‍–‍81 kg
Bronze medal – third place	2016 Tokyo	‍–‍81 kg
Bronze medal – third place	2018 Düsseldorf	‍–‍81 kg
Bronze medal – third place	2021 Tel Aviv	‍–‍81 kg
Bronze medal – third place	2021 Abu Dhabi	‍–‍81 kg
IJF Grand Prix
Gold medal – first place	2017 Düsseldorf	‍–‍81 kg
Gold medal – first place	2020 Tel Aviv	‍–‍81 kg
Silver medal – second place	2019 Perth	‍–‍81 kg
Bronze medal – third place	2016 Zagreb	‍–‍81 kg
Bronze medal – third place	2017 Hohhot	‍–‍81 kg
Bronze medal – third place	2019 Montreal	‍–‍81 kg
European U23 Championships
Gold medal – first place	2015 Bratislava	‍–‍81 kg
Silver medal – second place	2014 Wrocław	‍–‍81 kg
World Juniors Championships
Bronze medal – third place	2010 Agadir	‍–‍73 kg
European Junior Championships
Gold medal – first place	2013 Sarajevo	‍–‍81 kg
Summer Universiade
Silver medal – second place	2017 Taipei	‍–‍81 kg
Military World Games
Gold medal – first place	2019 Wuhan	Men's team

Profile at external databases
- IJF: 3807
- JudoInside.com: 66544
- Updated on 21 May 2023

Aslan Alanovich Lappinagov (Russian: Аслан Аланович Лаппинагов; born 9 August 1993) is a Russian judoka. He is the 2017 European bronze medalist in the 81 kg division.
