= Lee Eun-ju (judoka) =

South Korean judoka (born 1989)

Personal information
- Born: 10 January 1989 (age 37)
- Occupation: Judoka

Sport
- Country: South Korea
- Sport: Judo
- Weight class: +78 kg
Medal record
Women's judo
Representing South Korea
IJF Grand Prix
Silver medal – second place	2014 Jeju	+78 kg
Bronze medal – third place	2013 Jeju	+78 kg
Bronze medal – third place	2016 Qingdao	+78 kg
Asian Junior Championships
Bronze medal – third place	2008 Sana'a	+78 kg
World Cadets Championships
Silver medal – second place	2009 Budapest	‍–‍52 kg

Profile at external databases
- IJF: 1984
- JudoInside.com: 54194
- Updated on 8 December 2022

Lee Eun-ju (born 10 January 1989) is a South Korean judoka.

Lee is a bronze medalist from the 2016 Judo Grand Prix Qingdao in the +78 kg category.
