= 2016 Judo Grand Prix Ulaanbaatar =

Judo competition in Ulaanbaatar, Mongolia

Judo 2016 Judo Grand Prix Ulaanbaatar
- Venue: Buyant Ukhaa Sport Palace
- Location: Ulaanbaatar, Mongolia
- Dates: 1–3 July 2016
- Competitors: 126 from 13 nations

Competition at external databases
- Links: IJF • EJU • JudoInside

The 2016 Judo Grand Prix Ulaanbaatar was held at Buyant Ukhaa Sport Palace in Ulaanbaatar, Mongolia from 1 to 3 July 2016.

== Medal summary ==
=== Men's events ===
Event	Gold	Silver	Bronze
Extra-lightweight (−60 kg)	Dashdavaagiin Amartüvshin (MGL)	Ser-od Nasanjargal (MGL)	Bayarmagnai Dagvadorj (MGL)
Extra-lightweight (−60 kg)	Dashdavaagiin Amartüvshin (MGL)	Ser-od Nasanjargal (MGL)	Davud Mammadsoy (AZE)
Half-lightweight (−66 kg)	Dovdony Altansükh (MGL)	Batsuuri Adiya (MGL)	Andraž Jereb (SLO)
Half-lightweight (−66 kg)	Dovdony Altansükh (MGL)	Batsuuri Adiya (MGL)	Askhat Telmanov (KAZ)
Lightweight (−73 kg)	Leo Fogel (RUS)	Batgerel Battsetseg (MGL)	Fagan Guluzada (AZE)
Lightweight (−73 kg)	Leo Fogel (RUS)	Batgerel Battsetseg (MGL)	Khadbaatar Narankhuu (MGL)
Half-middleweight (−81 kg)	Nyamsürengiin Dagvasüren (MGL)	Jaromír Musil (CZE)	Jung Won-jun (KOR)
Half-middleweight (−81 kg)	Nyamsürengiin Dagvasüren (MGL)	Jaromír Musil (CZE)	Lee Hui-jung (KOR)
Middleweight (−90 kg)	Lkhagvasürengiin Otgonbaatar (MGL)	Gantulgyn Altanbagana (MGL)	Firudin Dadashov (AZE)
Middleweight (−90 kg)	Lkhagvasürengiin Otgonbaatar (MGL)	Gantulgyn Altanbagana (MGL)	Erihemubatu (CHN)
Half-heavyweight (−100 kg)	Zelym Kotsoiev (AZE)	Ishdorj Dashdulam (MGL)	Tuvshinjargal Gan (MGL)
Half-heavyweight (−100 kg)	Zelym Kotsoiev (AZE)	Ishdorj Dashdulam (MGL)	Ambaselmaa Bayarsaikhan (MGL)
Heavyweight (+100 kg)	Battulgyn Temüülen (MGL)	Ölziibayaryn Düürenbayar (MGL)	Sugarjargal Boldpurev (MGL)

=== Women's events ===
Event	Gold	Silver	Bronze
Extra-lightweight (−48 kg)	Mönkhbatyn Urantsetseg (MGL)	Otgontsetseg Galbadrakh (KAZ)	Yurie Morizaki (JPN)
Extra-lightweight (−48 kg)	Mönkhbatyn Urantsetseg (MGL)	Otgontsetseg Galbadrakh (KAZ)	Khorloo Battamir (MGL)
Half-lightweight (−52 kg)	Mako Uchio (JPN)	Azzaya Chintogtokh (MGL)	Baljinnyamyn Bat-Erdene (MGL)
Half-lightweight (−52 kg)	Mako Uchio (JPN)	Azzaya Chintogtokh (MGL)	Tena Šikić (CRO)
Lightweight (−57 kg)	Lkhagvatogoogiin Enkhriilen (MGL)	Megumi Ishikawa (JPN)	Andreja Leški (SLO)
Lightweight (−57 kg)	Lkhagvatogoogiin Enkhriilen (MGL)	Megumi Ishikawa (JPN)	Ji Yunseo (KOR)
Half-middleweight (−63 kg)	Baldorjyn Möngönchimeg (MGL)	Boldyn Gankhaich (MGL)	Kaho Yonezawa (JPN)
Half-middleweight (−63 kg)	Baldorjyn Möngönchimeg (MGL)	Boldyn Gankhaich (MGL)	Maho Nishikawa (JPN)
Middleweight (−70 kg)	Erina Ike (JPN)	Naranjargal Tsend-Ayush (MGL)	Davaasuren Munkhbat (MGL)
Middleweight (−70 kg)	Erina Ike (JPN)	Naranjargal Tsend-Ayush (MGL)	Barbara Matić (CRO)
Half-heavyweight (−78 kg)	Pürevjargalyn Lkhamdegd (MGL)	Brigita Matić-Ljuba (CRO)	Uuganjargal Munkh-Erdene (MGL)
Half-heavyweight (−78 kg)	Pürevjargalyn Lkhamdegd (MGL)	Brigita Matić-Ljuba (CRO)	Park Yu-jin (KOR)
Heavyweight (+78 kg)	Idalys Ortiz (CUB)	Odkhüügiin Javzmaa (MGL)	Suzuka Ichihashi (JPN)
Heavyweight (+78 kg)	Idalys Ortiz (CUB)	Odkhüügiin Javzmaa (MGL)	Battulgyn Mönkhtuyaa (MGL)

Source Results

=== Medal table ===
* Host nation (Mongolia)

Rank	Nation	Gold	Silver	Bronze	Total
1	Mongolia (MGL)*	9	10	10	29
2	Japan (JPN)	2	1	4	7
3	Azerbaijan (AZE)	1	0	3	4
4	Cuba (CUB)	1	0	0	1
4	Russia (RUS)	1	0	0	1
6	Croatia (CRO)	0	1	2	3
7	Kazakhstan (KAZ)	0	1	1	2
8	Czech Republic (CZE)	0	1	0	1
9	South Korea (KOR)	0	0	4	4
10	Slovenia (SLO)	0	0	2	2
11	China (CHN)	0	0	1	1
Totals (11 entries)		14	14	27	55
