= 2016 Judo Grand Prix Samsun =

Judo competition

Judo 2016 Judo Grand Prix Samsun
- Venue: Yaşar Doğu Sports Hall
- Location: Samsun, Turkey
- Dates: 1–3 April 2016
- Competitors: 397 from 67 nations

Competition at external databases
- Links: IJF • EJU • JudoInside

The 2016 Judo Grand Prix Samsun was held at the Tekkeköy Yaşar Doğu Arena in Samsun, Turkey from 1 to 3 April 2016.

== Medal summary ==
=== Men's events ===
Event	Gold	Silver	Bronze
Extra-lightweight (−60 kg)	Bekir Özlü (TUR)	Ahmet Şahin Kaba (TUR)	Ilgar Mushkiyev (AZE)
Extra-lightweight (−60 kg)	Bekir Özlü (TUR)	Ahmet Şahin Kaba (TUR)	Diyorbek Urozboev (UZB)
Half-lightweight (−66 kg)	Kim Lim-hwan (KOR)	Dovdony Altansükh (MGL)	Gevorg Khachatrian (UKR)
Half-lightweight (−66 kg)	Kim Lim-hwan (KOR)	Dovdony Altansükh (MGL)	Ferdinand Karapetian (ARM)
Lightweight (−73 kg)	Damian Szwarnowiecki (POL)	Kim Chol-gwang (PRK)	Nuno Saraiva (POR)
Lightweight (−73 kg)	Damian Szwarnowiecki (POL)	Kim Chol-gwang (PRK)	Hasan Vanlıoğlu (TUR)
Half-middleweight (−81 kg)	Ivaylo Ivanov (BUL)	Wang Ki-chun (KOR)	Sergiu Toma (UAE)
Half-middleweight (−81 kg)	Ivaylo Ivanov (BUL)	Wang Ki-chun (KOR)	Joachim Bottieau (BEL)
Middleweight (−90 kg)	Khusen Khalmurzaev (RUS)	Mammadali Mehdiyev (AZE)	Dilshod Choriev (UZB)
Middleweight (−90 kg)	Khusen Khalmurzaev (RUS)	Mammadali Mehdiyev (AZE)	Tiago Camilo (BRA)
Half-heavyweight (−100 kg)	Beka Gviniashvili (GEO)	Rafael Buzacarini (BRA)	Miklós Cirjenics (HUN)
Half-heavyweight (−100 kg)	Beka Gviniashvili (GEO)	Rafael Buzacarini (BRA)	Tsogtgerel Khutag (MGL)
Heavyweight (+100 kg)	Teddy Riner (FRA)	Levani Matiashvili (GEO)	Adam Okruashvili (GEO)
Heavyweight (+100 kg)	Teddy Riner (FRA)	Levani Matiashvili (GEO)	Rafael Silva (BRA)

=== Women's events ===
Event	Gold	Silver	Bronze
Extra-lightweight (−48 kg)	Otgontsetseg Galbadrakh (KAZ)	Dilara Lokmanhekim (TUR)	Sarah Menezes (BRA)
Extra-lightweight (−48 kg)	Otgontsetseg Galbadrakh (KAZ)	Dilara Lokmanhekim (TUR)	Laëtitia Payet (FRA)
Half-lightweight (−52 kg)	Gülbadam Babamuratowa (TKM)	Laura Gómez (ESP)	Gili Cohen (ISR)
Half-lightweight (−52 kg)	Gülbadam Babamuratowa (TKM)	Laura Gómez (ESP)	Distria Krasniqi (KOS)
Lightweight (−57 kg)	Hélène Receveaux (FRA)	Automne Pavia (FRA)	Miryam Roper (GER)
Lightweight (−57 kg)	Hélène Receveaux (FRA)	Automne Pavia (FRA)	Nekoda Smythe-Davis (GBR)
Half-middleweight (−63 kg)	Margaux Pinot (FRA)	Mariana Silva (BRA)	Kathrin Unterwurzacher (AUT)
Half-middleweight (−63 kg)	Margaux Pinot (FRA)	Mariana Silva (BRA)	Yang Junxia (CHN)
Middleweight (−70 kg)	Marie-Ève Gahié (FRA)	Fanny Estelle Posvite (FRA)	Elvismar Rodríguez (VEN)
Middleweight (−70 kg)	Marie-Ève Gahié (FRA)	Fanny Estelle Posvite (FRA)	María Pérez (PUR)
Half-heavyweight (−78 kg)	Madeleine Malonga (FRA)	Audrey Tcheuméo (FRA)	Marta Tort (ESP)
Half-heavyweight (−78 kg)	Madeleine Malonga (FRA)	Audrey Tcheuméo (FRA)	Sol Kyong (PRK)
Heavyweight (+78 kg)	Kim Ji-youn (KOR)	Melissa Mojica (PUR)	Svitlana Iaromka (UKR)
Heavyweight (+78 kg)	Kim Ji-youn (KOR)	Melissa Mojica (PUR)	Jasmin Grabowski (GER)

Source Results

=== Medal table ===
* Host nation (Turkey)

Rank	Nation	Gold	Silver	Bronze	Total
1	France (FRA)	5	3	1	9
2	South Korea (KOR)	2	1	0	3
3	Turkey (TUR)*	1	2	1	4
4	Georgia (GEO)	1	1	1	3
5	Bulgaria (BUL)	1	0	0	1
5	Kazakhstan (KAZ)	1	0	0	1
5	Poland (POL)	1	0	0	1
5	Russia (RUS)	1	0	0	1
5	Turkmenistan (TKM)	1	0	0	1
10	Brazil (BRA)	0	2	3	5
11	Azerbaijan (AZE)	0	1	1	2
11	Mongolia (MGL)	0	1	1	2
11	North Korea (PRK)	0	1	1	2
11	Puerto Rico (PUR)	0	1	1	2
11	Spain (ESP)	0	1	1	2
16	Germany (GER)	0	0	2	2
16	Ukraine (UKR)	0	0	2	2
16	Uzbekistan (UZB)	0	0	2	2
19	Armenia (ARM)	0	0	1	1
19	Austria (AUT)	0	0	1	1
19	Belgium (BEL)	0	0	1	1
19	China (CHN)	0	0	1	1
19	Great Britain (GBR)	0	0	1	1
19	Hungary (HUN)	0	0	1	1
19	Israel (ISR)	0	0	1	1
19	Kosovo (KOS)	0	0	1	1
19	Portugal (POR)	0	0	1	1
19	United Arab Emirates (UAE)	0	0	1	1
19	Venezuela (VEN)	0	0	1	1
Totals (29 entries)		14	14	28	56
