= Sami Chouchi =

Belgian judoka (born 1993)

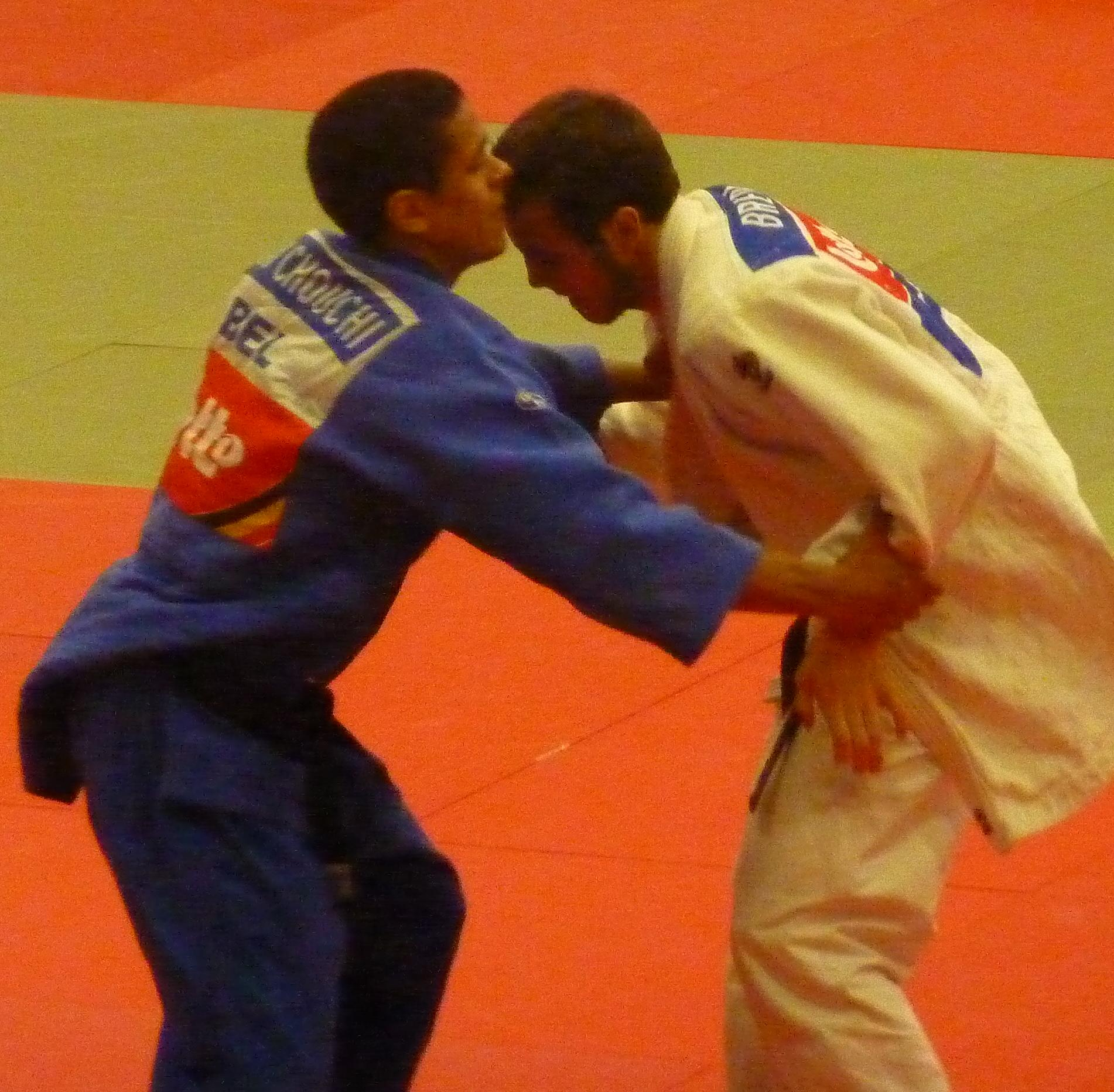
- Sami Chouchi (left), 2012

Personal information
- Born: 22 March 1993 (age 33) Brussels, Belgium
- Occupation: Judoka
- Height: 185 cm (6 ft 1 in)

Sport
- Country: Belgium
- Sport: Judo
- Weight class: ‍–‍81 kg, ‍–‍90 kg
- Retired: 22 May 2025

Achievements and titles
- World Champ.: 7th (2021)
- European Champ.: (silver) (2018)
Medal record
Men's judo
Representing Belgium
European Championships
Silver medal – second place	2018 Tel Aviv	‍–‍81 kg
Bronze medal – third place	2022 Sofia	‍–‍81 kg
IJF Grand Slam
Gold medal – first place	2021 Tbilisi	‍–‍81 kg
Bronze medal – third place	2021 Tashkent	‍–‍81 kg
Bronze medal – third place	2022 Paris	‍–‍81 kg
Bronze medal – third place	2022 Tel Aviv	‍–‍81 kg
IJF Grand Prix
Gold medal – first place	2018 Cancún	‍–‍81 kg
Bronze medal – third place	2019 Tel Aviv	‍–‍81 kg
Bronze medal – third place	2019 Tashkent	‍–‍81 kg
Bronze medal – third place	2023 Zagreb	‍–‍90 kg
European Junior Championships
Bronze medal – third place	2013 Sarajevo	‍–‍73 kg

Profile at external databases
- IJF: 14617
- JudoInside.com: 56514
- Updated on 25 May 2025

Sami Chouchi (born 22 March 1993) is a Belgian retired judoka. He started off his career in the ‍–‍73 kg weight category, switched in 2017 to the ‍–‍81 kg weight category where he found his path to an Olympic Games blocked by fellow Belgian Matthias Casse, so in 2023 he switched again to the heavier ‍–‍90 kg weight category. He won a silver medal in the ‍–‍81 kg 2018 European Championships and a bronze in the 2022 European Championships and had eight podium places in Grand Slams and Grand Prix with a gold at the 2021 Tbilisi Grand Slam and bronze at the 2021 Tashkent, the 2022 Paris and the 2022 Tel Aviv Grand Slams. He announced his retirement from the sport via social media on 22 May 2025 at the age of 32, citing the pain no longer worth the effort.

== Sports career ==
He was born in Brussels to a family of immigrants from North Africa – his father is Tunisian, his mother is Moroccan. He started judo in Uccle at the La Chênaie club under Alexandre Lespineux. He has been a member of the Belgian national team since 2014 in the lightweight category up to 73 kg. He did not qualify for the 2016 Rio Olympics . Since 2017 he has competed in the upper welterweight category up to 81 kg.
