= Judo at the 2015 European Games – Men's 100 kg =

Judo competition

Judo Men's 100 kg at the 2015 European Games
- Venue: Heydar Aliyev Arena
- Location: Baku, Azerbaijan
- Date: 27 June
- Competitors: 26 from 23 nations

Medalists
gold medal	Henk Grol (3rd title)	Netherlands
silver medal	Lukáš Krpálek	Czech Republic
bronze medal	Toma Nikiforov	Belgium
bronze medal	Cyrille Maret	France

Competition at external databases
- Links: IJF • JudoInside

The men's 100 kg judo event at the 2015 European Games in Baku was held on 27 June at the Heydar Aliyev Arena.

== Results ==
=== Final ===
Final
Lukáš Krpálek (CZE)	000
Henk Grol (NED)	001

=== Repechage ===
Repechage
Toma Nikiforov (BEL)	100
Karl-Richard Frey (GER)	001

Third place
Toma Nikiforov (BEL)	100
Jorge Fonseca (POR)	000

Repechage
Frederik Jørgensen (DEN)	000
Dimitri Peters (GER)	100

Third place
Dimitri Peters (GER)	000
Cyrille Maret (FRA)	001

=== Top half ===
Round of 32
Elkhan Mammadov (AZE)	100
Zlatko Kumrić (CRO)	000
Toma Nikiforov (BEL)	100
Miklós Cirjenics (HUN)	000
Stefan Jurišić (SRB)	000
Domenico Di Guida (ITA)	100
Artem Bloshenko (UKR)	000
Michael Korrel (NED)	010
Peter Paltchik (ISR)	112
David Büchel (LIE)	000

Round of 16
Lukáš Krpálek (CZE)	100
Elkhan Mammadov (AZE)	000
Toma Nikiforov (BEL)	110
Domenico Di Guida (ITA)	000
Karl-Richard Frey (GER)	010
Michael Korrel (NED)	000
Cyrille Maret (FRA)	100
Peter Paltchik (ISR)	000

Quarterfinals
Lukáš Krpálek (CZE)	000
Toma Nikiforov (BEL)	000
Karl-Richard Frey (GER)	000
Cyrille Maret (FRA)	101

Semifinals
Lukáš Krpálek (CZE)	100
Cyrille Maret (FRA)	000

=== Bottom half ===
Round of 32
Jorge Fonseca (POR)	002
Grigori Minaškin (EST)	000
Martin Pacek (SWE)	000
Jevgeņijs Borodavko (LAT)	000
Frederik Jørgensen (DEN)	101
Christoph Kronberger (AUT)	000
Jakub Wójcik (POL)	100
Matej Hajas (SVK)	000
Benjamin Fletcher (GBR)	100
Isaac Bezzina (MLT)	000

Round of 16
Elmar Gasimov (AZE)	000
Jorge Fonseca (POR)	101
Jevgeņijs Borodavko (LAT)	000
Frederik Jørgensen (DEN)	100
Dimitri Peters (GER)	100
Jakub Wójcik (POL)	000
Henk Grol (NED)	010
Benjamin Fletcher (GBR)	000

Quarterfinals
Jorge Fonseca (POR)	100
Frederik Jørgensen (DEN)	000
Dimitri Peters (GER)	000
Henk Grol (NED)	001

Semifinals
Jorge Fonseca (POR)	000
Henk Grol (NED)	010
