= 2017 World Judo Championships – Men's 100 kg =

Judo competition

Judo Men's 100 kg at the 2017 World Judo Championships
- Venue: László Papp Budapest Sports Arena
- Location: Budapest, Hungary
- Dates: 2 September
- Competitors: 55 from 47 nations
- Total prize money: 57,000$

Medalists
gold medal	Aaron Wolf (1st title)	Japan
silver medal	Varlam Liparteliani	Georgia
bronze medal	Elmar Gasimov	Azerbaijan
bronze medal	Kirill Denisov	Russia

Competition at external databases
- Links: IJF • JudoInside

The Men's 100 kg competition at the 2017 World Judo Championships was held on 2 September 2017.

== Results ==
=== Finals ===
Semi-finals
(Netherlands) Michael Korrel	00
(Japan) Aaron Wolf	01
(Georgia (country)) Varlam Liparteliani	10
(Azerbaijan) Elkhan Mammadov	00

Final
(Japan) Aaron Wolf	01
(Georgia (country)) Varlam Liparteliani	00

=== Repechage ===
Repechage
(Belgium) Toma Nikiforov	00
(Azerbaijan) Elmar Gasimov	01

Third place
(Azerbaijan) Elkhan Mammadov	00
(Azerbaijan) Elmar Gasimov	01

Repechage
(Russia) Kirill Denisov	10
(Russia) Kazbek Zankishiev	00

Third place
(Netherlands) Michael Korrel	00
(Russia) Kirill Denisov	12

=== Pool A ===
First round
(Croatia) Zlatko Kumrić	10
(Kenya) George Mburu	00
(Lithuania) Rokas Šimonis	00
(Uzbekistan) Sherali Juraev	11
(Turkey) Ali Erdogan	00
(Israel) Peter Paltchik	10
(Romania) Valentin Radu	00
(Belgium) Toma Nikiforov	10
(United Kingdom) Benjamin Fletcher	01
(Brazil) Luciano Corrêa	00
(Egypt) Ramadan Darwish	11
(Moldova) Denis Tachii	00

Second round
(Netherlands) Michael Korrel	03
(Croatia) Zlatko Kumrić	00
(Uzbekistan) Sherali Juraev	00
(Israel) Peter Paltchik	01
(Kazakhstan) Maxim Rakov	00
(Belgium) Toma Nikiforov	01
(United Kingdom) Benjamin Fletcher	00
(Egypt) Ramadan Darwish	01

Third round
(Netherlands) Michael Korrel	01
(Israel) Peter Paltchik	00
(Belgium) Toma Nikiforov	01
(Egypt) Ramadan Darwish	00

Quarterfinals
(Netherlands) Michael Korrel	02
(Belgium) Toma Nikiforov	00

=== Pool B ===
First round
(Jordan) Mahmoud Al-Msideen	00
(Japan) Aaron Wolf	10
(Sweden) Martin Pacek	10
(Slovakia) Milan Randl	00
(Estonia) Grigori Minaškin	02
(Greece) Theodoros Masmanidis	00
(Mongolia) Lkhagvasürengiin Otgonbaatar	10
(Tajikistan) Saidzhalol Saidov	00
(Dominican Republic) José Nova	10
(Bulgaria) Daniel Dichev	00
(Portugal) Jorge Fonseca	11
(South Korea) Won Jong-hoon	00

Second round
(Hungary) Miklós Cirjenics	01
(Japan) Aaron Wolf	11
(Sweden) Martin Pacek	00
(Estonia) Grigori Minaškin	00
(Azerbaijan) Elmar Gasimov	10
(Mongolia) Lkhagvasürengiin Otgonbaatar	01
(Dominican Republic) José Nova	00
(Portugal) Jorge Fonseca	10

Third round
(Japan) Aaron Wolf	10
(Sweden) Martin Pacek	00
(Azerbaijan) Elmar Gasimov	12
(Portugal) Jorge Fonseca	00

Quarterfinals
(Japan) Aaron Wolf	01
(Azerbaijan) Elmar Gasimov	00

=== Pool C ===
First round
(Austria) Laurin Böhler	01
(Latvia) Jevgeņijs Borodavko	11
(Georgia (country)) Varlam Liparteliani	01
(Ivory Coast) Koffi Kobena	00
(Romania) Luca Kunszabo	00
(Algeria) Lyès Bouyacoub	03
(Sweden) Joakim Dvarby	10
(Bosnia and Herzegovina) Ibro Miladin	00
(Australia) David Russell	00
(Hungary) Zalán Ohát	10
(Tajikistan) Shakarmamad Mirmamadov	10
(Guatemala) Armando Pineda	00

Second round
(France) Cyrille Maret	00
(Latvia) Jevgeņijs Borodavko	01
(Georgia (country)) Varlam Liparteliani	01
(Algeria) Lyès Bouyacoub	00
(Russia) Kirill Denisov	10
(Sweden) Joakim Dvarby	00
(Hungary) Zalán Ohát	11
(Tajikistan) Shakarmamad Mirmamadov	01

Third round
(Latvia) Jevgeņijs Borodavko	00
(Georgia (country)) Varlam Liparteliani	01
(Russia) Kirill Denisov	12
(Hungary) Zalán Ohát	00

Quarterfinals
(Georgia (country)) Varlam Liparteliani	01
(Russia) Kirill Denisov	00

=== Pool D ===
First round
(Dominican Republic) Lewis Medina	00
(Canada) Kyle Reyes	10
(Ukraine) Anton Savytskiy	01
(United Arab Emirates) Ivan Remarenco	00
(Iran) Ramin Safaviyeh	00
(Japan) Ryunosuke Haga	10
(Cuba) Andy Granda	10
(Belarus) Mikita Sviryd	00
(Chile) Thomas Briceño	00
(Montenegro) Danilo Pantić	01

Second round
(Azerbaijan) Elkhan Mammadov	01
(Canada) Kyle Reyes	00
(Ukraine) Anton Savytskiy	02
(Germany) Dimitri Peters	00
(Russia) Kazbek Zankishiev	11
(Japan) Ryunosuke Haga	00
(Cuba) Andy Granda	10
(Montenegro) Danilo Pantić	00

Third round
(Azerbaijan) Elkhan Mammadov	10
(Ukraine) Anton Savytskiy	00
(Russia) Kazbek Zankishiev	00
(Cuba) Andy Granda	00

Quarterfinals
(Azerbaijan) Elkhan Mammadov	11
(Russia) Kazbek Zankishiev	00

== Prize money ==
The sums listed bring the total prizes awarded to 57,000$ for the individual event.

Medal	Total	Judoka	Coach
Gold	26,000$	20,800$	5,200$
Silver	15,000$	12,000$	3,000$
Bronze	8,000$	6,400$	1,600$
