= 2015 World Judo Championships – Men's 100 kg =

Judo competition

Judo Men's 100 kg at the 2015 World Judo Championships
- Venue: Alau Ice Palace
- Location: Astana, Kazakhstan
- Date: 29 August
- Competitors: 55 from 46 nations
- Total prize money: 14,000$

Medalists
gold medal	Ryunosuke Haga (1st title)	Japan
silver medal	Karl-Richard Frey	Germany
bronze medal	Toma Nikiforov	Belgium
bronze medal	Dimitri Peters	Germany

Competition at external databases
- Links: IJF • JudoInside

The men's 100 kg competition of the 2015 World Judo Championships was held on 29 August 2015.

== Results ==
=== Finals ===
Semi-finals
(Czech Republic) Lukáš Krpálek	000
(Germany) Karl-Richard Frey	100
(France) Cyrille Maret	000
(Japan) Ryunosuke Haga	001

Final
(Germany) Karl-Richard Frey	000
(Japan) Ryunosuke Haga	000

=== Repechage ===
Repechage		Third place
(Belgium) Toma Nikiforov	101
(Mongolia) Naidangiin Tüvshinbayar	000	(Belgium) Toma Nikiforov	110
		(France) Cyrille Maret	000

Repechage		Third place
(Kyrgyzstan) Chingiz Mamedov	000
(Germany) Dimitri Peters	100	(Germany) Dimitri Peters	100
		(Czech Republic) Lukáš Krpálek	000

=== Pool A ===
First Round
(Ukraine) Artem Bloshenko	100
(Venezuela) Anthoni Peña	000
(Romania) Valentin Radu	000
(Azerbaijan) Elkhan Mammadov	100
(Austria) Christoph Kronberger	000
(Belgium) Toma Nikiforov	100
(Uruguay) Manuel Bueno	000
(Pakistan) Hussain Shah	100
(Latvia) Jevgeņijs Borodavko	000
(Netherlands) Michael Korrel	001

Quarterfinals
(Czech Republic) Lukáš Krpálek	000
(Ukraine) Artem Bloshenko	000
(Argentina) Héctor Campos	000
(Azerbaijan) Elkhan Mammadov	001
(Russia) Adlan Bisultanov	000
(Belgium) Toma Nikiforov	010
(Pakistan) Hussain Shah	000
(Netherlands) Michael Korrel	100

Semifinals
(Czech Republic) Lukáš Krpálek	100
(Azerbaijan) Elkhan Mammadov	001
(Belgium) Toma Nikiforov	100
(Netherlands) Michael Korrel	000

Final
(Czech Republic) Lukáš Krpálek	002
(Belgium) Toma Nikiforov	001

=== Pool B ===
First Round
(Canada) Kyle Reyes	110
(Poland) Jakub Wójcik	000
(Brazil) Luciano Corrêa	000
(Hungary) Miklós Cirjenics	000
(United Kingdom) Benjamin Fletcher	001
(Denmark) Frederik Jørgensen	000
(United States) Ajax Tadehara	000
(Cameroon) Seidou Nji Mouluh	110
(Liechtenstein) David Büchel	000
(Senegal) Baboukar Mané	101
(Mongolia) Naidangiin Tüvshinbayar	001
(Cuba) José Armenteros	000

Quarterfinals
(Germany) Karl-Richard Frey	001
(Canada) Kyle Reyes	000
(Brazil) Luciano Corrêa	000
(United Kingdom) Benjamin Fletcher	000
(Sweden) Martin Pacek	001
(Cameroon) Seidou Nji Mouluh	000
(Senegal) Baboukar Mané	000
(Mongolia) Naidangiin Tüvshinbayar	100

Semifinals
(Germany) Karl-Richard Frey	111
(United Kingdom) Benjamin Fletcher	000
(Sweden) Martin Pacek	000
(Mongolia) Naidangiin Tüvshinbayar	100

Final
(Germany) Karl-Richard Frey	010
(Mongolia) Naidangiin Tüvshinbayar	000

=== Pool C ===
First Round
(Uruguay) Pablo Aprahamian	000
(Estonia) Grigori Minaskin	101
(Trinidad and Tobago) Christopher George	000
(Kyrgyzstan) Chingiz Mamedov	110
(Senegal) Mbagnick Ndiaye	100
(United States) Andrew Jacobs	000
(New Zealand) Jason Koster	000
(Kazakhstan) Maxim Rakov	101
(Italy) Domenico Di Guida	100
(Bulgaria) Daniel Dichev	000
(Mexico) Sergio García	000
(Tunisia) Anis Ben Khaled	100

Quarterfinals
(Azerbaijan) Elmar Gasimov	000
(Estonia) Grigori Minaskin	000
(Kyrgyzstan) Chingiz Mamedov	100
(Senegal) Mbagnick Ndiaye	000
(France) Cyrille Maret	000
(Kazakhstan) Maxim Rakov	000
(Italy) Domenico Di Guida	000
(Tunisia) Anis Ben Khaled	000

Semifinals
(Azerbaijan) Elmar Gasimov	000
(Kyrgyzstan) Chingiz Mamedov	100
(France) Cyrille Maret	101
(Italy) Domenico Di Guida	000

Final
(Kyrgyzstan) Chingiz Mamedov	000
(France) Cyrille Maret	111

=== Pool D ===
First Round
(Tajikistan) Saidzhalol Saidov	000
(Hungary) Gergő Fogasy	101
(Pakistan) Wajahat Sarwar	000
(Uzbekistan) Ramziddin Sayidov	100
(Japan) Ryunosuke Haga	100
(Serbia) Stefan Jurišić	000
(Australia) Duke Didier	000
(Algeria) Lyès Bouyacoub	100
(South Korea) Cho Gu-ham	100
(China) Hu Kai	000

Quarterfinals
(Germany) Dimitri Peters	110
(Hungary) Gergő Fogasy	000
(Uzbekistan) Ramziddin Sayidov	000
(Croatia) Zlatko Kumrić	100
(Netherlands) Henk Grol	000
(Japan) Ryunosuke Haga	100
(Algeria) Lyès Bouyacoub	000
(South Korea) Cho Gu-ham	100

Semifinals
(Germany) Dimitri Peters	110
(Croatia) Zlatko Kumrić	000
(Japan) Ryunosuke Haga	010
(South Korea) Cho Gu-ham	000

Final
(Germany) Dimitri Peters	000
(Japan) Ryunosuke Haga	000

== Prize money ==
The sums listed bring the total prizes awarded to 14,000$ for the individual event.

Medal	Total	Judoka	Coach
Gold	6,000$	4,800$	1,200$
Silver	4,000$	3,200$	800$
Bronze	2,000$	1,600$	400$
