= 2018 World Judo Championships – Men's 100 kg =

Judo competition

Judo Men's 100 kg at the 2018 World Judo Championships
- Venue: National Gymnastics Arena
- Location: Baku, Azerbaijan
- Dates: 25 September
- Competitors: 54 from 44 nations
- Total prize money: 57,000€

Medalists
| gold medal | Cho Gu-ham (1st title) | South Korea |
| silver medal | Varlam Liparteliani | Georgia |
| bronze medal | Niyaz Ilyasov | Russia |
| bronze medal | Lkhagvasürengiin Otgonbaatar | Mongolia |

Competition at external databases
- Links: IJF • JudoInside

The Men's 100 kg competition at the 2018 World Judo Championships was held on 25 September 2018.

== Results ==
=== Finals ===
Semi-finals
(Georgia (country)) Varlam Liparteliani | 01
(Mongolia) Lkhagvasürengiin Otgonbaatar | 00
(South Korea) Cho Gu-ham | 01
(Russia) Niyaz Ilyasov | 00

Final
(Georgia (country)) Varlam Liparteliani | 00
(South Korea) Cho Gu-ham | 01

=== Repechage ===
Repechage
(Egypt) Ramadan Darwish | 10
(Portugal) Jorge Fonseca | 00

Third place
(Egypt) Ramadan Darwish | 00
(Russia) Niyaz Ilyasov | 01

Repechage
(Netherlands) Michael Korrel | 00
(Japan) Aaron Wolf | 01

Third place
(Japan) Aaron Wolf | 00
(Mongolia) Lkhagvasürengiin Otgonbaatar | 10

=== Pool A ===
First round
(Ivory Coast) Koffi Kobena | 00
(France) Alexandre Iddir | 10
(Azerbaijan) Elmar Gasimov | 10
(Sweden) Martin Pacek | 00
(Kazakhstan) Viktor Demyanenko | 00
(United Arab Emirates) Ivan Remarenco | 01
(Uzbekistan) Mukhammadkarim Khurramov | 10
(Senegal) Baye Diawara | 00
(New Zealand) Jason Koster | 00
(Canada) Kyle Reyes | 01

Second round
(Georgia (country)) Varlam Liparteliani | 01
(France) Alexandre Iddir | 00
(Montenegro) Danilo Pantić | 00
(Azerbaijan) Elmar Gasimov | 10
(Egypt) Ramadan Darwish | 10
(United Arab Emirates) Ivan Remarenco | 00
(Uzbekistan) Mukhammadkarim Khurramov | 10
(Canada) Kyle Reyes | 00

Third round
(Georgia (country)) Varlam Liparteliani | 10
(Azerbaijan) Elmar Gasimov | 00
(Egypt) Ramadan Darwish | 10
(Uzbekistan) Mukhammadkarim Khurramov | 00

Quarterfinals
(Georgia (country)) Varlam Liparteliani | 10
(Egypt) Ramadan Darwish | 00

=== Pool B ===
First round
(Czech Republic) Michal Horák | 10
(Algeria) Lyès Bouyacoub | 00
(Ukraine) Anton Savytskiy | 10
(Pakistan) Hussain Shah | 00
(Austria) Aaron Fara | 00
(Latvia) Jevgeņijs Borodavko | 01
(Iraq) Ali Al-Zaidi | 01
(Chile) Thomas Briceño | 10
(Mongolia) Lkhagvasürengiin Otgonbaatar | 01
(United States) L.A. Smith III | 00

Second round
(Portugal) Jorge Fonseca | 11
(Czech Republic) Michal Horák | 00
(Ukraine) Anton Savytskiy | 10
(Belarus) Daniel Mukete | 00
(Israel) Peter Paltchik | 00
(Latvia) Jevgeņijs Borodavko | 10
(Chile) Thomas Briceño | 00
(Mongolia) Lkhagvasürengiin Otgonbaatar | 01

Third round
(Portugal) Jorge Fonseca | 10
(Ukraine) Anton Savytskiy | 00
(Latvia) Jevgeņijs Borodavko | 00
(Mongolia) Lkhagvasürengiin Otgonbaatar | 10

Quarterfinals
(Portugal) Jorge Fonseca | 00
(Mongolia) Lkhagvasürengiin Otgonbaatar | 10

=== Pool C ===
First round
(Azerbaijan) Zelym Kotsoiev | 00
(Sweden) Joakim Dvarby | 10
(Hungary) Zalán Ohát | 10
(Burundi) Fleury Nihozeko | 00
(Fiji) Tevita Takayawa | 00
(Serbia) Bojan Došen | 10
(Croatia) Zlatko Kumrić | 00
(France) Cyrille Maret | 10
(Montenegro) Anto Dubreta | 11
(China) Li Huilin | 01
(Lithuania) Karolis Bauža | 10
(Dominican Republic) Lewis Medina | 00

Second round
(Netherlands) Michael Korrel | 10
(Sweden) Joakim Dvarby | 00
(Hungary) Zalán Ohát | 00
(Serbia) Bojan Došen | 01
(South Korea) Cho Gu-ham | 10
(France) Cyrille Maret | 00
(Montenegro) Anto Dubreta | 00
(Lithuania) Karolis Bauža | 10

Third round
(Netherlands) Michael Korrel | 11
(Serbia) Bojan Došen | 00
(South Korea) Cho Gu-ham | 10
(Lithuania) Karolis Bauža | 00

Quarterfinals
(Netherlands) Michael Korrel | 00
(South Korea) Cho Gu-ham | 01

=== Pool D ===
First round
(Japan) Aaron Wolf | 10
(Slovakia) Matej Hajaš | 00
(Switzerland) Patrik Moser | 00
(Bulgaria) Daniel Dichev | 10
(Uzbekistan) Sherali Juraev | 00
(Estonia) Grigori Minaškin | 10
(Guinea) Michel Kalivogui | 00
(Belarus) Mikita Sviryd | 10
(Austria) Laurin Böhler | 01
(Ukraine) Danylo Hutsol | 00

Second round
(Russia) Kirill Denisov | 00
(Japan) Aaron Wolf | 11
(Germany) Karl-Richard Frey | 10
(Bulgaria) Daniel Dichev | 00
(Russia) Niyaz Ilyasov | 10
(Estonia) Grigori Minaškin | 00
(Belarus) Mikita Sviryd | 10
(Austria) Laurin Böhler | 00

Third round
(Japan) Aaron Wolf | 10
(Germany) Karl-Richard Frey | 00
(Russia) Niyaz Ilyasov | 10
(Belarus) Mikita Sviryd | 00

Quarterfinals
(Japan) Aaron Wolf | 00
(Russia) Niyaz Ilyasov | 10

== Prize money ==
The sums listed bring the total prizes awarded to 57,000€ for the individual event.

| Medal | Total | Judoka | Coach |
|---|---|---|---|
| Gold | 26,000€ | 20,800€ | 5,200€ |
| Silver | 15,000€ | 12,000€ | 3,000€ |
| Bronze | 8,000€ | 6,400€ | 1,600€ |
