= 2021 World Judo Championships – Men's 100 kg =

Judo competition

Judo Men's 100 kg at the 2021 World Judo Championships
- Venue: László Papp Budapest Sports Arena
- Location: Budapest, Hungary
- Date: 11 June
- Competitors: 52 from 39 nations
- Total prize money: 57,000€

Medalists
| gold medal | Jorge Fonseca (2nd title) | Portugal |
| silver medal | Aleksandar Kukolj | Serbia |
| bronze medal | Varlam Liparteliani | Georgia |
| bronze medal | Ilia Sulamanidze | Georgia |

Competition at external databases
- Links: IJF • JudoInside

The Men's 100 kg competition at the 2021 World Judo Championships was held on 11 June 2021.

== Results ==
=== Finals ===
Semi-finals
(Serbia) Aleksandar Kukolj | 01
(Canada) Shady El Nahas | 00
(Netherlands) Michael Korrel | 00
(Portugal) Jorge Fonseca | 11

Final
(Serbia) Aleksandar Kukolj | 00
(Portugal) Jorge Fonseca | 11

=== Repechage ===
Repechage
(Georgia (country)) Varlam Liparteliani | 01
Arman Adamian | 00

Third place
(Georgia (country)) Varlam Liparteliani | 10
(Netherlands) Michael Korrel | 00

Repechage
(France) Alexandre Iddir | 00
(Georgia (country)) Ilia Sulamanidze | 10

Third place
(Georgia (country)) Ilia Sulamanidze | 01
(Canada) Shady El Nahas | 00

=== Pool A ===
First round
(Netherlands) Simeon Catharina | 01
(Austria) Aaron Fara | 00
(France) Cyrille Maret | 00
(South Korea) Won Jong-hoon | 01
(Gabon) Luc Manongho | 00
(Belgium) Toma Nikiforov | 10
(Greece) Georgios Malliaropoulos | 00
(Mongolia) Batkhuyagiin Gonchigsüren | 10
(Serbia) Aleksandar Kukolj | 10
(South Africa) Lwazi Mapitiza | 00

Second round
(Georgia (country)) Varlam Liparteliani | 01
(Netherlands) Simeon Catharina | 00
(Japan) Kentaro Iida | 10
(South Korea) Won Jong-hoon | 00
(Uzbekistan) Mukhammadkarim Khurramov | 10
(Belgium) Toma Nikiforov | 01
(Mongolia) Batkhuyagiin Gonchigsüren | 01
(Serbia) Aleksandar Kukolj | 11

Third round
(Georgia (country)) Varlam Liparteliani | 01
(Japan) Kentaro Iida | 00
(Uzbekistan) Mukhammadkarim Khurramov | 00
(Serbia) Aleksandar Kukolj | 10

Quarterfinals
(Georgia (country)) Varlam Liparteliani | 01
(Serbia) Aleksandar Kukolj | 10

=== Pool B ===
First round
(United States) L.A. Smith III | 00
(Latvia) Jevgeņijs Borodavko | 10
(Estonia) Otto Imala | 11
(Brazil) Leonardo Gonçalves | 00
(New Zealand) Jason Koster | 10
(Kenya) Joseph Irungu | 00
(Hungary) Zsombor Vég | 00
(Sweden) Joakim Dvarby | 10
(Bulgaria) Daniel Dichev | 01
(Algeria) Mustapha Bouamar | 00

Second round
(Canada) Shady El Nahas | 11
(Latvia) Jevgeņijs Borodavko | 01
(Estonia) Otto Imala | 10
(Croatia) Zlatko Kumrić | 00
Arman Adamian | 11
(New Zealand) Jason Koster | 00
(Sweden) Joakim Dvarby | 10
(Bulgaria) Daniel Dichev | 00

Third round
(Canada) Shady El Nahas | 10
(Estonia) Otto Imala | 00
Arman Adamian | 10
(Sweden) Joakim Dvarby | 00

Quarterfinals
(Canada) Shady El Nahas | 10
Arman Adamian | 00

=== Pool C ===
First round
(Australia) Kaihan Takagi | 00
(Fiji) Tevita Takayawa | 10
(Montenegro) Danilo Pantić | 10
(Kuwait) Abdullah Taleb | 00
(Serbia) Bojan Došen | 10
(Chile) Thomas Briceño | 00
(Germany) Karl-Richard Frey | 01
(Belarus) Mikita Sviryd | 00

Second round
(Netherlands) Michael Korrel | 10
(Fiji) Tevita Takayawa | 00
(Estonia) Grigori Minaškin | 00
(Brazil) Rafael Buzacarini | 10
(France) Alexandre Iddir | 10
(Montenegro) Danilo Pantić | 00
(Serbia) Bojan Došen | 10
(Germany) Karl-Richard Frey | 00

Third round
(Netherlands) Michael Korrel | 10
(Brazil) Rafael Buzacarini | 00
(France) Alexandre Iddir | 10
(Serbia) Bojan Došen | 00

Quarterfinals
(Netherlands) Michael Korrel | 10
(France) Alexandre Iddir | 00

=== Pool D ===
First round
(Denmark) Mathias Madsen | 00
(Uzbekistan) Muzaffarbek Turoboyev | 10
(United States) Nathaniel Keeve | 00
(Canada) Kyle Reyes | 10
(Georgia (country)) Ilia Sulamanidze | 10
(Turkey) Mert Şişmanlar | 00
Adnan Khankan | 00
(Hungary) Miklós Cirjenics | 10
(Ukraine) Anton Savytskiy | 00
(Mongolia) Otgonbaatar Lkhagvasuren | 10

Second round
(Portugal) Jorge Fonseca | 10
(Uzbekistan) Muzaffarbek Turoboyev | 00
(Canada) Kyle Reyes | 10
(Bulgaria) Boris Georgiev | 00
(Azerbaijan) Elmar Gasimov | 00
(Georgia (country)) Ilia Sulamanidze | 01
(Hungary) Miklós Cirjenics | 00
(Mongolia) Otgonbaatar Lkhagvasuren | 01

Third round
(Portugal) Jorge Fonseca | 11
(Canada) Kyle Reyes | 00
(Georgia (country)) Ilia Sulamanidze | 10
(Mongolia) Otgonbaatar Lkhagvasuren | 00

Quarterfinals
(Portugal) Jorge Fonseca | 10
(Georgia (country)) Ilia Sulamanidze | 00

== Prize money ==
The sums listed bring the total prizes awarded to 57,000€ for the individual event.

| Medal | Total | Judoka | Coach |
|---|---|---|---|
| Gold | 26,000€ | 20,800€ | 5,200€ |
| Silver | 15,000€ | 12,000€ | 3,000€ |
| Bronze | 8,000€ | 6,400€ | 1,600€ |
