= 2019 World Judo Championships – Men's 100 kg =

Judo competition

Judo Men's 100 kg at the 2019 World Judo Championships
- Venue: Nippon Budokan
- Location: Tokyo, Japan
- Date: 30 August
- Competitors: 62 from 49 nations
- Total prize money: 57,000$

Medalists
| gold medal | Jorge Fonseca (1st title) | Portugal |
| silver medal | Niyaz Ilyasov | Russia |
| bronze medal | Michael Korrel | Netherlands |
| bronze medal | Aaron Wolf | Japan |

Competition at external databases
- Links: IJF • JudoInside

The Men's 100 kg competition at the 2019 World Judo Championships was held on 30 August 2019.

== Results ==
=== Finals ===
Semi-finals
(Portugal) Jorge Fonseca | 01
(Azerbaijan) Elmar Gasimov | 00
(South Korea) Cho Gu-ham | 00
(Russia) Niyaz Ilyasov | 10

Final
(Portugal) Jorge Fonseca | 01
(Russia) Niyaz Ilyasov | 00

=== Repechage ===
Repechage
(Georgia (country)) Varlam Liparteliani | 00
(Netherlands) Michael Korrel | 01

Third place
(Netherlands) Michael Korrel | 01
(South Korea) Cho Gu-ham | 00

Repechage
(Japan) Aaron Wolf | 11
(Canada) Shady El Nahas | 00

Third place
(Japan) Aaron Wolf | 01
(Azerbaijan) Elmar Gasimov | 00

=== Pool A ===
First round
(China) EriHemubatu | 00
(Estonia) Grigori Minaškin | 10
(Algeria) Lyès Bouyacoub | 00
(Croatia) Zlatko Kumrić | 01
(Hungary) Miklós Cirjenics | 00
(France) Alexandre Iddir | 10
(Portugal) Jorge Fonseca | 01
(Chile) Thomas Briceño | 00
(India) Avtar Singh | 10
(Fiji) Tevita Takayawa | 00
(Canada) Kyle Reyes | 11
(Montenegro) Anto Dubreta | 00
(Republic of Ireland) Benjamin Fletcher | 11
(Poland) Iwo Baraniewski | 00

Second round
(Georgia (country)) Varlam Liparteliani | 10
(Estonia) Grigori Minaškin | 00
(Croatia) Zlatko Kumrić | 00
(France) Alexandre Iddir | 01
(Portugal) Jorge Fonseca | 11
(India) Avtar Singh | 00
(Canada) Kyle Reyes | 00
(Republic of Ireland) Benjamin Fletcher | 10

Third round
(Georgia (country)) Varlam Liparteliani | 01
(France) Alexandre Iddir | 00
(Portugal) Jorge Fonseca | 11
(Republic of Ireland) Benjamin Fletcher | 00

Quarterfinals
(Georgia (country)) Varlam Liparteliani | 00
(Portugal) Jorge Fonseca | 10

=== Pool B ===
First round
(Netherlands) Michael Korrel | 11
(Austria) Laurin Böhler | 00
(Kazakhstan) Aibek Serikbayev | 00
(Bulgaria) Daniel Dichev | 01
(Tajikistan) Saidzhalol Saidov | 00
(Pakistan) Shah Hussain Shah | 10
(Mongolia) Lkhagvasürengiin Otgonbaatar | 00
(Germany) Karl-Richard Frey | 10
(Brazil) Rafael Buzacarini | 10
(United Arab Emirates) Ivan Remarenco | 00
(Kenya) George Mburu | 00
(Russia) Arman Adamian | 10
(Azerbaijan) Elmar Gasimov | 01
(Belarus) Daniel Mukete | 00

Second round
(Netherlands) Michael Korrel | 10
(Peru) José Arroyo | 00
(Bulgaria) Daniel Dichev | 10
(Pakistan) Shah Hussain Shah | 00
(Germany) Karl-Richard Frey | 00
(Brazil) Rafael Buzacarini | 11
(Russia) Arman Adamian | 00
(Azerbaijan) Elmar Gasimov | 10

Third round
(Netherlands) Michael Korrel | 11
(Bulgaria) Daniel Dichev | 00
(Brazil) Rafael Buzacarini | 00
(Azerbaijan) Elmar Gasimov | 10

Quarterfinals
(Netherlands) Michael Korrel | 00
(Azerbaijan) Elmar Gasimov | 10

=== Pool C ===
First round
Adnan Khankan | 00
(Finland) Jaakko Alli | 10
(Serbia) Bojan Došen | 00
(Netherlands) Simeon Catharina | 10
(Nauru) Joshua Kam | 00
(Dominican Republic) Lewis Medina | 10
(Japan) Aaron Wolf | 10
(Ivory Coast) Koffi Kobena | 00
(Azerbaijan) Zelym Kotsoiev | 10
(Brazil) Leonardo Gonçalves | 00
(United States) L.A. Smith III | 11
(Latvia) Jevgeņijs Borodavko | 00

Second round
(South Korea) Cho Gu-ham | 11
(Finland) Jaakko Alli | 00
(Netherlands) Simeon Catharina | 10
(Dominican Republic) Lewis Medina | 01
(Japan) Aaron Wolf | 10
(Azerbaijan) Zelym Kotsoiev | 00
(Belarus) Mikita Sviryd | 10
(United States) L.A. Smith III | 00

Third round
(South Korea) Cho Gu-ham | 10
(Netherlands) Simeon Catharina | 00
(Japan) Aaron Wolf | 01
(Belarus) Mikita Sviryd | 00

Quarterfinals
(South Korea) Cho Gu-ham | 01
(Japan) Aaron Wolf | 00

=== Pool D ===
First round
(Israel) Peter Paltchik | 00
(Uzbekistan) Mukhammadkarim Khurramov | 01
(New Zealand) Jason Koster | 00
(Canada) Shady El Nahas | 11
(Philippines) Carl Aseneta | 00
(Montenegro) Danilo Pantić | 10
(Lithuania) Karolis Bauža | 00
(Austria) Aaron Fara | 10
(Egypt) Ramadan Darwish | 10
(Hungary) Zalán Ohát | 00
(France) Cyrille Maret | 10
(Poland) Oleksiy Lysenko | 00
(Sweden) Joakim Dvarby | 01
(Uruguay) Pablo Aprahamian | 00
(Russia) Niyaz Ilyasov | 10
(Slovakia) Márius Fízeľ | 00

Second round
(Uzbekistan) Mukhammadkarim Khurramov | 00
(Canada) Shady El Nahas | 10
(Montenegro) Danilo Pantić | 00
(Austria) Aaron Fara | 10
(Egypt) Ramadan Darwish | 01
(France) Cyrille Maret | 11
(Sweden) Joakim Dvarby | 00
(Russia) Niyaz Ilyasov | 11

Third round
(Canada) Shady El Nahas | 10
(Austria) Aaron Fara | 00
(France) Cyrille Maret | 00
(Russia) Niyaz Ilyasov | 10

Quarterfinals
(Canada) Shady El Nahas | 00
(Russia) Niyaz Ilyasov | 10

== Prize money ==
The sums listed bring the total prizes awarded to 57,000$ for the individual event.

| Medal | Total | Judoka | Coach |
|---|---|---|---|
| Gold | 26,000$ | 20,800$ | 5,200$ |
| Silver | 15,000$ | 12,000$ | 3,000$ |
| Bronze | 8,000$ | 6,400$ | 1,600$ |
