= 2021 European Judo Championships – Men's 100 kg =

Judo Men's 100 kg at the 2021 European Judo Championships
- Venue: Altice Arena
- Location: Lisbon, Portugal
- Date: 18 April
- Competitors: 32 from 24 nations

Medalists
gold medal	Toma Nikiforov (2nd title)	Belgium
silver medal	Varlam Liparteliani	Georgia
bronze medal	Alexandre Iddir	France
bronze medal	Zelym Kotsoiev	Azerbaijan

Competition at external databases
- Links: IJF • JudoInside

The men's 100 kg competition at the 2021 European Judo Championships was held on 18 April at the Altice Arena. This event was part of a larger tournament running from April 16-18, involving 359 judokas from 45 nations.

In this weight category, notable athletes competed, including Varlam Liparteliani from Georgia, a silver medalist at previous international tournaments, and Toma Nikiforov of Belgium.

== Results ==
=== Final ===
Final
Varlam Liparteliani (GEO)	00
Toma Nikiforov (BEL)	10

=== Repechage ===
Repechage
Alexandre Iddir (FRA)	01
Jorge Fonseca (POR)	00

Third place
Alexandre Iddir (FRA)	01
Ilia Sulamanidze (GEO)	00

Repechage
Cyrille Maret (FRA)	00
Zelym Kotsoiev (AZE)	10

Third place
Zelym Kotsoiev (AZE)	10
Niyaz Ilyasov (RUS)	00

=== Top half ===
Round of 32
Varlam Liparteliani (GEO)	01
Mert Şişmanlar (TUR)	00
Eduard Şerban (ROU)	00
Kacper Szczurowski (POL)	01
Alexandre Iddir (FRA)	10
Miklós Cirjenics (HUN)	00
Jevgeņijs Borodavko (LAT)	00
Danylo Hutsol (UKR)	10
Jorge Fonseca (POR)	10
Georgios Malliaropoulos (GRE)	00
Grigori Minaškin (EST)	11
Daniel Dichev (BUL)	00
Niyaz Ilyasov (RUS)	10
Mathias Madsen (DEN)	00
Marko Kumrić (CRO)	00
Aleksandar Kukolj (SRB)	01

Round of 16
Varlam Liparteliani (GEO)	10
Kacper Szczurowski (POL)	00
Alexandre Iddir (FRA)	01
Danylo Hutsol (UKR)	00
Jorge Fonseca (POR)	11
Grigori Minaškin (EST)	00
Niyaz Ilyasov (RUS)	10
Aleksandar Kukolj (SRB)	01

Quarterfinals
Varlam Liparteliani (GEO)	11
Alexandre Iddir (FRA)	00
Jorge Fonseca (POR)	00
Niyaz Ilyasov (RUS)	10

Semifinals
Varlam Liparteliani (GEO)	01
Niyaz Ilyasov (RUS)	00

=== Bottom half ===
Round of 32
Peter Paltchik (ISR)	10
Bojan Došen (SRB)	00
Joakim Dvärby (SWE)	01
Cyrille Maret (FRA)	11
Elmar Gasimov (AZE)	00
Toma Nikiforov (BEL)	01
Diogo Brites (POR)	00
Mikita Sviryd (BLR)	01
Michael Korrel (NED)	00
Ilia Sulamanidze (GEO)	10
Oleksii Lysenko (POL)	01
Zlatko Kumrić (CRO)	11
Zelym Kotsoiev (AZE)	01
Aaron Fara (AUT)	00
Dario Kurbjeweit Garcia (GER)	00
Zsombor Vég (HUN)	01

Round of 16
Peter Paltchik (ISR)	00
Cyrille Maret (FRA)	10
Toma Nikiforov (BEL)	01
Mikita Sviryd (BLR)	00
Ilia Sulamanidze (GEO)	10
Zlatko Kumrić (CRO)	00
Zelym Kotsoiev (AZE)	10
Zsombor Vég (HUN)	01

Quarterfinals
Cyrille Maret (FRA)	00
Toma Nikiforov (BEL)	01
Ilia Sulamanidze (GEO)	11
Zelym Kotsoiev (AZE)	00

Semifinals
Toma Nikiforov (BEL)	10
Ilia Sulamanidze (GEO)	01
