= 2016 European Judo Championships – Men's 100 kg =

Judo Men's 100 kg at the 2016 European Judo Championships
- Venue: TatNeft Arena
- Location: Kazan, Russia
- Date: 23 April
- Competitors: 27 from 24 nations

Medalists
gold medal	Henk Grol (4th title)	Netherlands
silver medal	Toma Nikiforov	Belgium
bronze medal	Grigori Minaškin	Estonia
bronze medal	Michael Korrel	Netherlands

Competition at external databases
- Links: IJF • JudoInside

The men's 100 kg competition at the 2016 European Judo Championships was held on 23 April at the TatNeft Arena, in Kazan, Russia.

== Results ==
=== Finals ===
Semi-finals
Henk Grol (NED)	00
Christoph Kronberger (AUT)	00
Grigori Minaškin (EST)	00
Toma Nikiforov (BEL)	10

Final
Henk Grol (NED)	10
Toma Nikiforov (BEL)	00

=== Repechage ===
Repechage
Elmar Gasimov (AZE)	00
Jevgeņijs Borodavko (LAT)	00

Third place
Elmar Gasimov (AZE)	00
Grigori Minaškin (EST)	00

Repechage
Benjamin Fletcher (GBR)	00
Michael Korrel (NED)	00

Third place
Michael Korrel (NED)	00
Christoph Kronberger (AUT)	00

=== Pool A ===
First round
Artem Bloshenko (UKR)	01
Niyaz Bilalov (RUS)	00
Henk Grol (NED)	10
Patrik Moser (SUI)	00
Beka Gviniashvili (GEO)	10
Domenico Di Guida (ITA)	00

Round of 16
Elmar Gasimov (AZE)	01
Artem Bloshenko (UKR)	00
Henk Grol (NED)	10
Beka Gviniashvili (GEO)	00

Quarterfinals
Elmar Gasimov (AZE)	00
Henk Grol (NED)	00

=== Pool B ===
First round
Karim Gharbi (SMR)	00
Christoph Kronberger (AUT)	10
Danilo Pantić (MNE)	01
Jevgeņijs Borodavko (LAT)	10

Round of 16
Dimitri Peters (GER)	00
Christoph Kronberger (AUT)	01
Martin Pacek (SWE)	00
Jevgeņijs Borodavko (LAT)	00

Quarterfinals
Christoph Kronberger (AUT)	10
Jevgeņijs Borodavko (LAT)	01

=== Pool C ===
First round
Grigori Minaškin (EST)	10
Stefan Jurišić (SRB)	00
Adlan Bisultanov (RUS)	01
Elkhan Mammadov (AZE)	10
Jakub Wójcik (POL)	00
Benjamin Fletcher (GBR)	00

Round of 16
Lukáš Krpálek (CZE)	00
Grigori Minaškin (EST)	01
Elkhan Mammadov (AZE)	00
Benjamin Fletcher (GBR)	10

Quarterfinals
Grigori Minaškin (EST)	10
Benjamin Fletcher (GBR)	00

=== Pool D ===
First round
Michael Korrel (NED)	10
Frederik Jørgensen (DEN)	00
Toma Nikiforov (BEL)	10
Miklós Cirjenics (HUN)	00
Zlatko Kumrić (CRO)	11
Denis Tachii (MDA)	00

Round of 16
Cyrille Maret (FRA)	00
Michael Korrel (NED)	00
Toma Nikiforov (BEL)	11
Zlatko Kumrić (CRO)	00

Quarterfinals
Michael Korrel (NED)	00
Toma Nikiforov (BEL)	10
