= Georgia at the 2020 Summer Olympics =

- Flag of Georgia
- IOC code: GEO
- NOC: Georgian National Olympic Committee
- Website: www.geonoc.org.ge (in Georgian and English)

in Tokyo, Japan July 23, 2021 – August 8, 2021
- Competitors: 35 in 11 sports
- Flag bearers (opening): Nino Salukvadze; Lasha Talakhadze
- Flag bearer (closing): Gogita Arkania
- Medals Ranked 33rd: Gold 2 Silver 5 Bronze 1 Total 8

Summer Olympics appearances (overview)
- 1996; 2000; 2004; 2008; 2012; 2016; 2020; 2024

Other related appearances
- Russian Empire (1900–1912); Soviet Union (1952–1988); Unified Team (1992)

Georgia competed at the 2020 Summer Olympics in Tokyo. Originally scheduled to take place from 24 July to 9 August 2020, the Games were postponed to 23 July to 8 August 2021, because of the COVID-19 pandemic. It was the nation's seventh consecutive appearance at the Summer Olympics in the post-Soviet era.

== Medalists ==
| Medal | Name | Sport | Event | Date |
|---|---|---|---|---|
| Gold | Lasha Bekauri | Judo | Men's 90 kg | 28 July |
| Gold | Lasha Talakhadze | Weightlifting | Men's +109 kg | 4 August |
| Silver | Vazha Margvelashvili | Judo | Men's 66 kg | 25 July |
| Silver | Lasha Shavdatuashvili | Judo | Men's 73 kg | 26 July |
| Silver | Guram Tushishvili | Judo | Men's +100 kg | 30 July |
| Silver | Iakob Kajaia | Wrestling | Men's Greco-Roman 130 kg | 2 August |
| Silver | Geno Petriashvili | Wrestling | Men's freestyle 125 kg | 6 August |
| Bronze | Anton Pliesnoi | Weightlifting | Men's 96 kg | 31 July |

== Competitors ==
The following is the list of number of competitors participating in the Games:

| Sport | Men | Women | Total |
|---|---|---|---|
| Athletics | 4 | 1 | 5 |
| Boxing | 3 | 0 | 3 |
| Fencing | 1 | 0 | 1 |
| Gymnastics | 0 | 1 | 1 |
| Judo | 7 | 2 | 9 |
| Karate | 1 | 0 | 1 |
| Shooting | 0 | 1 | 1 |
| Swimming | 1 | 1 | 2 |
| Tennis | 1 | 0 | 1 |
| Weightlifting | 4 | 0 | 4 |
| Wrestling | 7 | 0 | 7 |
| Total | 29 | 6 | 35 |

== Athletics ==
Georgian athletes further achieved the entry standards, either by qualifying time or by world ranking, in the following track and field events (up to a maximum of 3 athletes in each event):

Key

- Note–Ranks given for track events are within the athlete's heat only
- Q = Qualified for the next round
- q = Qualified for the next round as a fastest loser or, in field events, by position without achieving the qualifying target
- NR = National record
- N/A = Round not applicable for the event
- Bye = Athlete not required to compete in round

Field events

| Athlete | Event | Qualification | | Final | |
| Athlete | Event | Distance | Position | Distance | Position |
|---|---|---|---|---|---|
| Bachana Khorava | Men's long jump | 7.41 | 28 | Did not advance | |
| Lasha Gulelauri | Men's triple jump | NM | — | Did not advance | |
| Benik Abramyan | Men's shot put | DNS | | Did not advance | |
| Giorgi Mujaridze | Men's shot put | 19.76 | 27 | Did not advance | |
| Sopo Shatirishvili | Women's shot put | 15.31 | 30 | Did not advance | |

== Boxing ==
Georgia entered three male boxers into the Olympic tournament for the first time in 12 years. 2019 European Games silver medalist Sakhil Alakhverdovi (men's flyweight), Eskerkhan Madiev (men's welterweight), and Giorgi Kharabadze (men's middleweight) secured the spots on the Georgian squad in their respective weight divisions, either by winning the round of 16 match, advancing to the semifinal match, or scoring a box-off triumph, at the 2020 European Qualification Tournament in London and Paris.

| Athlete | Event | Round of 32 | Round of 16 | Quarterfinals | Semifinals | Final | |
| Athlete | Event | Opposition Result | Opposition Result | Opposition Result | Opposition Result | Opposition Result | Rank |
|---|---|---|---|---|---|---|---|
| Sakhil Alakhverdovi | Men's flyweight | Hu Jg (CHN); L 0–5 | Did not advance | | | | |
| Eskerkhan Madiev | Men's welterweight | Sotomayor (AZE); W RSC-I | Bwogi (UGA); W 3–1 | Zamkovoy (ROC); L 0–5 | Did not advance | | |
| Giorgi Kharabadze | Men's middleweight | Kakhramonov (UZB); L 0–5 | Did not advance | | | | |

== Fencing ==
Georgia entered one fencer into the Olympic competition. Rio 2016 Olympian Sandro Bazadze claimed a spot in the men's sabre as one of the two highest-ranked fencers vying for qualification from Europe in the FIE Adjusted Official Rankings.

| Athlete | Event | Round of 64 | Round of 32 | Round of 16 | Quarterfinal | Semifinal | Final / BM | |
| Athlete | Event | Opposition Score | Opposition Score | Opposition Score | Opposition Score | Opposition Score | Opposition Score | Rank |
|---|---|---|---|---|---|---|---|---|
| Sandro Bazadze | Men's sabre | Bye | Samer (EGY); W 15–10 | El-Sissy (EGY); W 15–12 | Oh S-u (KOR); W 15–13 | Szilágyi (HUN); L 13–15 | Kim J-h (KOR); L 11–15 | 4 |

== Gymnastics ==
=== Rhythmic ===
Georgia entered one gymnasts to compete at the Olympics, after get the allocation quota at the 2019 Rhythmic Gymnastics World Championships in Baku, Azerbaijan.

| Athlete | Event | Qualification | | | | | | Final | | | | | |
| Athlete | Event | Hoop | Ball | Clubs | Ribbon | Total | Rank | Hoop | Ball | Clubs | Ribbon | Total | Rank |
|---|---|---|---|---|---|---|---|---|---|---|---|---|---|
| Salome Pazhava | Individual | 23.550 | 21.950 | 23.500 | 20.650 | 89.650 | 17 | Did not advance | | | | | |

== Judo ==
Georgia entered nine judoka (seven men and two women) into the Olympic tournament based on the International Judo Federation Olympics Individual Ranking.

Men

| Athlete | Event | Round of 64 | Round of 32 | Round of 16 | Quarterfinals | Semifinals | Repechage | Final / BM | |
| Athlete | Event | Opposition Result | Opposition Result | Opposition Result | Opposition Result | Opposition Result | Opposition Result | Opposition Result | Rank |
|---|---|---|---|---|---|---|---|---|---|
| Lukhumi Chkhvimiani | −60 kg | — | Bye | Huseynov (AZE); W 10–00 | Takato (JPN); L 00–10 | Did not advance | Kim W-j (KOR); L 00–10 | Did not advance | 7 |
| Vazha Margvelashvili | −66 kg | — | Bye | Shamilov (ROC); W 01–00 | Shmailov (ISR); W 10–00 | An B-u (KOR); W 01–00 | Bye | Abe (JPN); L 00–01 | 2nd place, silver medalist(s) |
| Lasha Shavdatuashvili | −73 kg | Bye | Chaine (FRA); W 01–00 | Houssein (DJI); W 01–00 | Margelidon (CAN); W 10–00 | An C-r (KOR); W 10–00 | Bye | Ono (JPN); L 00–01 | 2nd place, silver medalist(s) |
| Tato Grigalashvili | −81 kg | Bye | Murodov (TJK); W 11–00 | Lee S-h (KOR); W 10–00 | Mollaei (MGL); L 01–10 | Did not advance | Boltaboev (UZB); W 01–00 | Casse (BEL); L 00–10 | 5 |
| Lasha Bekauri | −90 kg | Bye | Kuczera (POL); W 10–00 | Kochman (ISR); W 10–01 | Bobonov (UZB); W 10–00 | Igolnikov (ROC); W 01–00 | Bye | Trippel (GER); W 01–00 | 1st place, gold medalist(s) |
| Varlam Liparteliani | −100 kg | — | Bye | Darwish (EGY); W 10–00 | El Nahas (CAN); W 10–00 | Wolf (JPN); L 00–01 | Bye | Ilyasov (ROC); L 00–01 | 5 |
| Guram Tushishvili | +100 kg | — | Bye | Rakhimov (TJK); W 10–00 | Silva (BRA); W 10–00 | Bashaev (ROC); W 11–01 | Bye | Krpálek (CZE); L 00–10 | 2nd place, silver medalist(s) |

Women

| Athlete | Event | Round of 32 | Round of 16 | Quarterfinals | Semifinals | Repechage | Final / BM | |
| Athlete | Event | Opposition Result | Opposition Result | Opposition Result | Opposition Result | Opposition Result | Opposition Result | Rank |
|---|---|---|---|---|---|---|---|---|
| Tetiana Levytska-Shukvani | −52 kg | Anestor (HAI); W 10–00 | Buchard (FRA); L 00–11 | Did not advance | | | | |
| Eteri Liparteliani | −57 kg | Mucungui (ANG); W 10–00 | Stoll (GER); W 10–00 | Cysique (FRA); L 01–10 | Did not advance | Kowalczyk (POL); W 01–00 | Yoshida (JPN); L 00–10 | 5 |

== Karate ==
Georgia entered one karateka into the inaugural Olympic tournament. Gogita Arkania qualified directly for the men's kumite +75 kg category by finishing top three at 2021 World Olympic Qualification Tournament in Paris, France.

Kumite

| Athlete | Event | Round robin | | | | | Semifinals | Final | |
| Athlete | Event | Opposition Result | Opposition Result | Opposition Result | Opposition Result | Rank | Opposition Result | Opposition Result | Rank |
|---|---|---|---|---|---|---|---|---|---|
| Gogita Arkania | Men's +75 kg | Araga (JPN); L 2–3 | Aktaş (TUR); L 1–3 | Horne (GER); W 3–4^{K} | Yuldashev (KAZ); W 3–1 | 3 | Did not advance | | |

== Shooting ==
Georgian shooters achieved quota places for the following events by virtue of their best finishes at the 2018 ISSF World Championships, the 2019 ISSF World Cup series, European Championships or Games, and European Qualifying Tournament, as long as they obtained a minimum qualifying score (MQS) by May 31, 2020.

| Athlete | Event | Qualification | | Final | |
| Athlete | Event | Points | Rank | Points | Rank |
|---|---|---|---|---|---|
| Nino Salukvadze | Women's 10 m air pistol | 567 | 31 | Did not advance | |
| Nino Salukvadze | Women's 25 m pistol | 578 | 25 | Did not advance | |

== Swimming ==
| Athlete | Event | Heat | | Semifinal | | Final | |
| Athlete | Event | Time | Rank | Time | Rank | Time | Rank |
|---|---|---|---|---|---|---|---|
| Irakli Revishvili | Men's 400 m freestyle | 3:57.49 | 32 | — | | Did not advance | |
| Mariam Imnadze | Women's 100 m freestyle | DNS | | Did not advance | | | |

== Tennis ==
At the conclusion of the qualification period for the Olympic tennis tournament and after some withdrawals, the following players had qualified for the competition by means of rankings.

| Athlete | Event | Round of 64 | Round of 32 | Round of 16 | Quarterfinals | Semifinals | Final / BM | |
| Athlete | Event | Opposition Score | Opposition Score | Opposition Score | Opposition Score | Opposition Score | Opposition Score | Rank |
|---|---|---|---|---|---|---|---|---|
| Nikoloz Basilashvili | Men's singles | Carballés (ESP); W 6–3, 6–2 | Sonego (ITA); W 6–4, 3–6, 6–4 | Zverev (GER); L 4–6, 6–7^{(5–7)} | Did not advance | | | |

== Weightlifting ==
Georgia qualified four male weightlifters for each of the following classes into the Olympic competition. Shota Mishvelidze (men's 61 kg), Anton Pliesnoi (men's 96 kg), and reigning Olympic champion Lasha Talakhadze (men's +109 kg) secured one of the top eight slots each in their respective weight divisions based on the IWF Absolute World Ranking, with Goga Chkheidze (men's 67 kg) topping the list of weightlifters from Europe in the men's 67 kg division of the IWF Absolute Continental Ranking.

| Athlete | Event | Snatch | | Clean & jerk | | Total | Rank |
| Athlete | Event | Result | Rank | Result | Rank | Total | Rank |
|---|---|---|---|---|---|---|---|
| Shota Mishvelidze | Men's −61 kg | 130 | 5 | 155 | 7 | 285 | 7 |
| Goga Chkheidze | Men's −67 kg | 133 | 12 | 169 | 8 | 302 | 8 |
| Anton Pliesnoi | Men's −96 kg | 177 | 3 | 210 | 3 | 387 | 3rd place, bronze medalist(s) |
| Lasha Talakhadze | Men's +109 kg | 223 WR | 1 | 265 WR | 1 | 488 WR | 1st place, gold medalist(s) |

== Wrestling ==
Georgia qualified seven wrestlers for each of the following classes into the Olympic competition. Four of them finished among the top six to book Olympic spots in the men's freestyle (97 and 125 kg) and men's Greco-Roman (97 and 130 kg) wrestling at the 2019 World Championships, while three additional licenses were awarded to the Georgian wrestlers, who progressed to the top two finals of their respective weight categories at the 2021 European Olympic Qualification Tournament in Budapest, Hungary.

Key:

- VT (ranking points: 5–0 or 0–5) – Victory by fall.
- VB (ranking points: 5–0 or 0–5) – Victory by injury (VF for forfeit, VA for withdrawal or disqualification)
- PP (ranking points: 3–1 or 1–3) – Decision by points – the loser with technical points.
- PO (ranking points: 3–0 or 0–3) – Decision by points – the loser without technical points.
- ST (ranking points: 4–0 or 0–4) – Great superiority – the loser without technical points and a margin of victory of at least 8 (Greco-Roman) or 10 (freestyle) points.
- SP (ranking points: 4–1 or 1–4) – Technical superiority – the loser with technical points and a margin of victory of at least 8 (Greco-Roman) or 10 (freestyle) points.

Freestyle

| Athlete | Event | Round of 16 | Quarterfinal | Semifinal | Repechage | Final / BM | |
| Athlete | Event | Opposition Result | Opposition Result | Opposition Result | Opposition Result | Opposition Result | Rank |
|---|---|---|---|---|---|---|---|
| Avtandil Kentchadze | Men's −74 kg | Chamizo (ITA); L 1–3 ^{PP} | Did not advance | | | | 12 |
| Elizbar Odikadze | Men's −97 kg | Mohammadian (IRI); W 3–1 ^{PP} | Sadulaev (ROC); L 0–4 ^{ST} | Did not advance | Sharifov (AZE); L 1–3 ^{PP} | Did not advance | 8 |
| Geno Petriashvili | Men's −125 kg | Abdelmottaleb (EGY); W 4–0 ^{ST} | Deng (CHN); W 3–1 ^{PP} | Zare (IRI); W 3–1 ^{PP} | Bye | Steveson (USA); L 1–3 ^{PP} | 2nd place, silver medalist(s) |

Greco-Roman

| Athlete | Event | Round of 16 | Quarterfinal | Semifinal | Repechage | Final / BM | |
| Athlete | Event | Opposition Result | Opposition Result | Opposition Result | Opposition Result | Opposition Result | Rank |
|---|---|---|---|---|---|---|---|
| Ramaz Zoidze | Men's −67 kg | Borrero (CUB); W 3–1 ^{PP} | Al-Obaidi (EOR); W 4–0 ^{ST} | Geraei (IRI); L 1–3 ^{PP} | Bye | Stäbler (GER); L 1–3 ^{PP} | 5 |
| Lasha Gobadze | Men's −87 kg | Assakalov (UZB); L 1–3 ^{PP} | Did not advance | | | | 11 |
| Giorgi Melia | Men's −97 kg | Evloev (ROC); L 1–3 ^{PP} | Did not advance | | Szőke (HUN); L 1–3 ^{PP} | Did not advance | 9 |
| Iakob Kajaia | Men's −130 kg | Kuosmanen (FIN); W 5–0 ^{VT} | Semenov (ROC); W 3–1 ^{PP} | Acosta (CHI); W 3–1 ^{PP} | Bye | López (CUB); L 0–3 ^{PO} | 2nd place, silver medalist(s) |

== See also ==
- Georgia at the 2020 Summer Paralympics
