= Judo at the 2020 Summer Olympics – Men's 100 kg =

Judo competition

Men's 100 kg at the Games of the XXXII Olympiad
- Venue: Nippon Budokan
- Date: 29 July 2021
- Competitors: 25 from 25 nations

Medalists
1st place, gold medalist(s)		Aaron Wolf	Japan
2nd place, silver medalist(s)		Cho Gu-ham	South Korea
3rd place, bronze medalist(s)		Jorge Fonseca	Portugal
3rd place, bronze medalist(s)		Niyaz Ilyasov	ROC

The men's 100 kg competition in judo at the 2020 Summer Olympics in Tokyo was held on 29 July 2021 at the Nippon Budokan.

== Results ==
=== Finals ===
Semi-finals
1 Varlam Liparteliani (GEO)	00
5 Aaron Wolf (JPN)	01
2 Jorge Fonseca (POR)	00
6 Cho Gu-ham (KOR)	01

Gold medal
5 Aaron Wolf (JPN)	10
6 Cho Gu-ham (KOR)	00

=== Repechage ===
Repechage
8 Shady El Nahas (CAN)	10
4 Peter Paltchik (ISR)	00

Bronze medal
2 Jorge Fonseca (POR)	01
8 Shady El Nahas (CAN)	00

Repechage
7 Niyaz Ilyasov (ROC)	01
Karl-Richard Frey (GER)	00

Bronze medal
1 Varlam Liparteliani (GEO)	00
7 Niyaz Ilyasov (ROC)	01

=== Pool A ===
Round of 32
Hussain Shah Shah (PAK)	00
Ramadan Darwish (EGY)	10
8 Shady El Nahas (CAN)	10
Ivan Remarenco (UAE)	00
Zelym Kotsoiev (AZE)	01
Alexandre Iddir (FRA)	00

Round of 16
1 Varlam Liparteliani (GEO)	10
Ramadan Darwish (EGY)	00
8 Shady El Nahas (CAN)	10
Zelym Kotsoiev (AZE)	00

Quarter-finals
1 Varlam Liparteliani (GEO)	10
8 Shady El Nahas (CAN)	00

=== Pool B ===
Round of 32
Lkhagvasürengiin Otgonbaatar (MGL)	01
Grigori Minaškin (EST)	00
Benjamin Fletcher (IRL)	00
Mukhammadkarim Khurramov (UZB)	01

Round of 16
4 Peter Paltchik (ISR)	01
Lkhagvasürengiin Otgonbaatar (MGL)	00
5 Aaron Wolf (JPN)	10
Mukhammadkarim Khurramov (UZB)	00

Quarter-finals
4 Peter Paltchik (ISR)	00
5 Aaron Wolf (JPN)	01

=== Pool C ===
Round of 32
Toma Nikiforov (BEL)	01
Rafael Buzacarini (BRA)	00
Miklós Cirjenics (HUN)	W/O (Note: Jevgeņijs Borodavko did not pass the official weigh-in and did not take part in the competition.)
~~Jevgeņijs Borodavko (LAT)~~

Round of 16
2 Jorge Fonseca (POR)	10
Toma Nikiforov (BEL)	00
7 Niyaz Ilyasov (ROC)	10
Miklós Cirjenics (HUN)	00

Quarter-finals
2 Jorge Fonseca (POR)	01
7 Niyaz Ilyasov (ROC)	00

=== Pool D ===
Round of 32
Karl-Richard Frey (GER)	10
Mikita Sviryd (BLR)	00
Aleksandar Kukolj (SRB)	10
Tevita Takayawa (FIJ)	00

Round of 16
3 Michael Korrel (NED)	00
Karl-Richard Frey (GER)	01
6 Cho Gu-ham (KOR)	10
Aleksandar Kukolj (SRB)	00

Quarter-finals
Karl-Richard Frey (GER)	00
6 Cho Gu-ham (KOR)	01
