= Corruption in Cape Verde =

The incidence of corruption in Cape Verde is relatively low. While this problem is widespread in other formerly colonized countries of Africa, the former Portuguese colony is usually seen as an exception. This is attributed to the stringent legal framework that includes laws, regulations, and penalties that seek to prevent and mitigate it. Transparency International cited Cape Verde along with Botswana, Seychelles, Rwanda, and Namibia as positive examples of African countries that have effective anti-corruption action.

== Legal framework ==
Cape Verde has been a stable representative democracy since the 1990s after it adopted a multi-party political system. The legal framework that penalizes corruption has a strong Portuguese influence. This legal system is also similar to the European variants of the continental legal system. Specific laws that punish corruption include the country's Penal Code, which criminalizes bribery, embezzlement, and other forms of graft and corruption.

Cape Verde is also part of several international anti-corruption conventions such as the United Nations Convention against Corruption (UNCAC). Its commitments to these treaties have led to robust laws and policies that successfully addressed corruption. The main institutions mandated to prevent and combat corruption include the Ministry of Justice, the Financial Intelligence Unit, the Court of Audit, and the General Inspectorate of Finance.

== Anti-corruption measures ==
Cape Verde is known for its drive of “open promotion of institutional transparency”, which is part of the larger drive for open government instituted by President Jorge Fonseca. The key components of this policy include Open Data Initiatives, which entails the establishment of an open data platform that provides citizens access to information held by the government. This includes budget, public procurement, and other information involving governmental processes. The enhanced transparency does not only allow for the understanding of how public funds are spent but also serves to promote accountability.

While no national strategy for the prevention of corruption has been instituted, there are several state agencies and instruments that can implement general provision policies that include components relating to the prevention of corruption and ensuring good governance. An example is the National Commission for the Fight Against Corruption (CNLC), which is mandated to facilitate and implement anti-corruption measures. This body works with other state agencies, NGOs, and international partners with the aim of strengthening Cape Verde's anti-corruption framework.

By 2007, Transparency International identified Cape Verde as part of the top ten African countries that displayed the lowest levels of corruption in the region. The country maintained this distinction in succeeding years. In 2013, United States President Barack Obama described Cape Verde as a success story, citing the country's development brought about by good governance and management.

== Challenges ==
Despite successes in its anti-corruption efforts, Cape Verde still struggles with certain cases of corruption such as bribery and nepotism at the municipal level. These involve allegations of patronage and graft in infrastructure projects as well as other public spending and procurement processes. To address this problem, Cape Verde has revised the Penal Code so that the statute of limitations is extended, covering offenses related to corruption and influence peddling. The government also formed the Corruption Council in 2019, which is tasked to identify areas in the economy at risk of corruption and to evaluate the efficacy of current anti-corruption measures.

== International rankings ==
In Transparency International's 2025 Corruption Perceptions Index, Cape Verde scored 62 on a scale from 0 ("highly corrupt") to 100 ("very clean"). When ranked by score, Cape Verde ranked 35th among the 182 countries in the Index, where the country ranked first is perceived to have the most honest public sector. For comparison with regional scores, the best score among sub-Saharan African countries (Note: Angola, Benin, Botswana, Burkina Faso, Burundi, Cameroon, Cape Verde, Central African Republic, Chad, Comoros, Côte d'Ivoire, Democratic Republic of the Congo, Djibouti, Equatorial Guinea, Eritrea, Eswatini, Ethiopia, Gabon, Gambia, Ghana, Guinea, Guinea-Bissau, Kenya, Lesotho, Liberia, Madagascar, Malawi, Mali, Mauritania, Mauritius, Mozambique, Namibia, Niger, Nigeria, Republic of the Congo, Rwanda, Sao Tome and Principe, Senegal, Seychelles, Sierra Leone, Somalia, South Africa, South Sudan, Sudan, Tanzania, Togo, Uganda, Zambia, and Zimbabwe.) was 68, the average was 32 and the worst was 9. For comparison with worldwide scores, the best score was 89 (ranked 1), the average was 42, and the worst was 9 (ranked 181, in a two-way tie).
