= Rafael Buzacarini =

Brazilian judoka (born 1991)

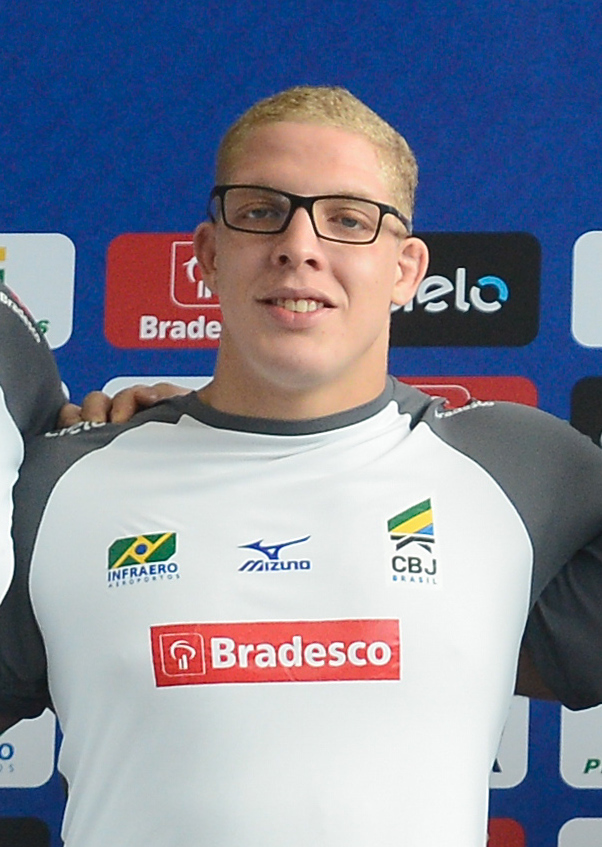
- Buzacarini in 2016

Personal information
- Full name: Rafael Augusto Buzacarini
- Born: 6 October 1991 (age 34) Barra Bonita, São Paulo, Brazil
- Occupation: Judoka
- Height: 185 cm (6 ft 1 in)

Sport
- Country: Brazil
- Sport: Judo
- Weight class: ‍–‍100 kg, +100 kg
- Club: Associação de Judô Vila Sônia
- Coached by: Luiz Shinohara

Achievements and titles
- Olympic Games: R16 (2016)
- World Champ.: R16 (2019, 2021, 2022)
- Pan American Champ.: (2020, 2022, 2025)
Medal record
Men's judo
Representing Brazil
Pan American Championships
Silver medal – second place	2020 Guadalajara	‍–‍100 kg
Silver medal – second place	2022 Lima	‍–‍100 kg
Silver medal – second place	2025 Santiago	+100 kg
Bronze medal – third place	2014 Guayaquil	‍–‍100 kg
Bronze medal – third place	2024 Rio de Janeiro	‍–‍100 kg
IJF Grand Slam
Silver medal – second place	2015 Paris	‍–‍100 kg
Silver medal – second place	2019 Brasilia	‍–‍100 kg
Bronze medal – third place	2023 Tbilisi	‍–‍100 kg
IJF Grand Prix
Silver medal – second place	2013 Almaty	‍–‍100 kg
Silver medal – second place	2016 Samsun	‍–‍100 kg
Silver medal – second place	2016 Almaty	‍–‍100 kg
Silver medal – second place	2019 Tbilisi	‍–‍100 kg
Silver medal – second place	2019 Antalya	‍–‍100 kg
Silver medal – second place	2023 Perth	‍–‍100 kg
Silver medal – second place	2025 Lima	+100 kg
Bronze medal – third place	2013 Miami	‍–‍100 kg
Bronze medal – third place	2013 Qingdao	‍–‍100 kg
Bronze medal – third place	2014 Düsseldorf	‍–‍100 kg
Bronze medal – third place	2017 Tbilisi	‍–‍100 kg
Bronze medal – third place	2018 Cancún	‍–‍100 kg
Bronze medal – third place	2020 Tel Aviv	‍–‍100 kg
Bronze medal – third place	2024 Odivelas	‍–‍100 kg
Bronze medal – third place	2024 Linz	‍–‍100 kg
Bronze medal – third place	2025 Guadalajara	+100 kg
Summer Universiade
Bronze medal – third place	2013 Kazan	‍–‍100 kg
Bronze medal – third place	2013 Kazan	Men's team

Profile at external databases
- IJF: 11829
- JudoInside.com: 89438
- Updated on 20 October 2025

Rafael Augusto Buzacarini (born 6 October 1991) is a heavyweight judoka from Brazil. He won two silver medals at the 2020 and 2022 Pan American Judo Championships and qualified for the 2016 and 2020 Summer Olympics.

== Career ==
He began practicing judo at the age of five, with encouragement from his parents. He moved to São Paulo, starting to defend the Vila Sônia Judo Association. In 2012, he was runner-up in the Brazilian under-23 championship. The following year, he was a silver medalist at the Grand Prix in Almaty, Kazakhstan and a bronze medalist at the Grand Prix in Qingdao, China. He also won two bronze medals at the Universiade held in Kazan, Russia.

At the 2014 Pan American Judo Championships held in Guayaquil, Ecuador, he won a bronze medal in the Half-heavyweight (100 kg) category.

Buzacarini won his first Grand Slam medal (the tournament that gives the most points in the judo ranking after the Olympic Games, the World Championships and the World Masters) at the 2015 Judo Grand Slam Paris, where he won the silver medal, defeating, in the semi-final, Elmar Gasimov, from Azerbaijan, who was the current leader of the world rankings.

He competed in the 2016 Olympic Games in Rio de Janeiro, reaching the round of 16 in the Men's 100 kg category, where he was defeated by eventual bronze medalist, Japanese Ryunosuke Haga.

At the 2019 World Judo Championships, Buzacarini won two fights and reached the round of 16, where he was eliminated by Elmar Gasimov, Olympic runner-up in 2016.

Buzacarini obtained his second medal in Grand Slams at the 2019 Judo Grand Slam Brasilia, where he reached the decision against the Japanese Kentaro Iida, taking the silver medal.

He represented Brazil at the 2020 Summer Olympics, held in 2021, in Tokyo, Japan. He was defeated in his debut in the Men's 100 kg category by Belgian Toma Nikiforov. He represented Brazil in the mixed team competition, with a 4–2 defeat to Israel.

At the 2020 Pan American Judo Championships held in Guadalajara, Mexico, he won a silver medal in the Half-heavyweight (100 kg) category.

At the 2021 World Judo Championships, Buzacarini debuted against Estonian judoka Grigori Minaskin and achieved one of the most beautiful ippon of the day at the Laszlo Papp Arena. The Brazilian aggressively attacked the Dutchman Michael Korrel, bronze in the last World Championships, in Tokyo 2019, but ended up being eliminated in the round of 16.

At the 2022 Pan American Judo Championships held in Lima, Peru, he won a silver medal in the Half-heavyweight (100 kg) category.

At the 2022 World Judo Championships, Bye in the opening round, Buzacarini (12th in the ranking) debuted with an ippon against Kazakh Islam Bozbayev (44th), but in the round of 16, he had to face Korrel again (no. 2 in the world), who eliminated him from the World Championship in 2021. The dispute with Korrel was fierce (both received two shido) and well balanced, but the Dutchman managed a waza-ari and came out on top, advancing in the competition.

At the 2023 Judo Grand Slam Tbilisi, he lost in the semifinals to the second-placed in the world rankings, Georgian Ilia Sulamanidze, but later obtained the bronze medal.

Number 17 in the world in the light heavyweight category (-100kg), Buzacarini entered the 2023 World Judo Championships and advanced to the round of 16, winning two fights, but fell to Canadian Kyle Reyes, world runner-up last year.

At the 2024 Pan American-Oceania Judo Championships, he won a bronze medal.

At the 2024 World Judo Championships, Buzacarini debuted with victory over Isaac Bazzina, from Malta, but stopped at two-time world champion Nikoloz Sherazadshvili, from Spain.

At the 2025 Pan American-Oceania Judo Championships, he won the silver medal.
