= Ayouba Traoré =

Malian judoka (born 1982)

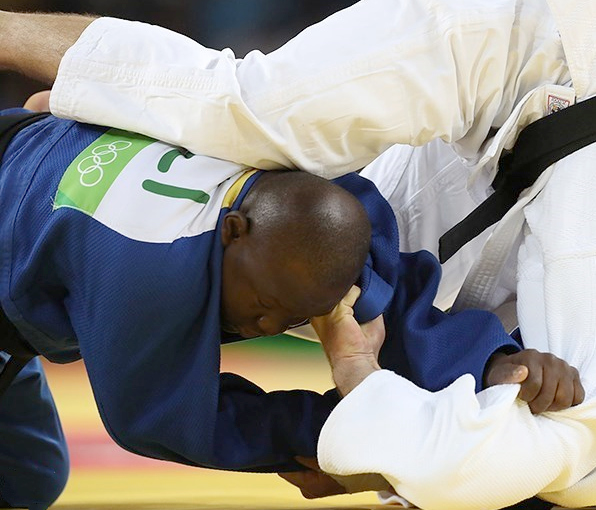
- Traoré at the 2016 Olympics

Personal information
- Nationality: Malian
- Born: 9 August 1982 (age 43)
- Height: 180 cm (5 ft 11 in)

Sport
- Sport: Judo

Ayouba Traoré (born 9 August 1982) is a heavyweight judoka from Mali. He competed at the 2016 Summer Olympics, in the 100 kg category, and was eliminated by Cyrille Maret in the first bout.

Traoré works at a French international school in Bamako.
