= Judo at the 2016 Summer Olympics – Men's 100 kg =

Judo competition

Men's 100 kg at the Games of the XXXI Olympiad
- Venue: Carioca Arena 2
- Date: 11 August 2016
- Competitors: 34 from 34 nations

Medalists
1st place, gold medalist(s)		Lukáš Krpálek	Czech Republic
2nd place, silver medalist(s)		Elmar Gasimov	Azerbaijan
3rd place, bronze medalist(s)		Cyrille Maret	France
3rd place, bronze medalist(s)		Ryunosuke Haga	Japan

The men's 100 kg competition in judo at the 2016 Summer Olympics in Rio de Janeiro was held on 11 August at the Carioca Arena 2.

The gold and silver medals were determined by a single-elimination tournament, with the winner of the final taking gold and the loser receiving silver. Judo events awarded two bronze medals. Quarterfinal losers competed in a repechage match for the right to face a semifinal loser for a bronze medal (that is, the judokas defeated in quarterfinals A and B competed against each other, with the winner of that match facing the semifinal loser from the other half of the bracket).

The medals for the competition were presented by Alex Gilady, Israel, member of the International Olympic Committee and the gifts were presented by Rovnag Adullayev, Azerbaijan Judo Federation president.

== Results ==
=== Finals ===
Semi-finals
Elmar Gasimov (AZE)	100
Artem Bloshenko (UKR)	000
Cyrille Maret (FRA)	000
Lukáš Krpálek (CZE)	100

Final
Elmar Gasimov (AZE)	000
Lukáš Krpálek (CZE)	100

=== Repechages ===
Repechage		Bronze medal
Ramadan Darwish (EGY)	000
Karl-Richard Frey (GER)	100	Karl-Richard Frey (GER)	000
		Cyrille Maret (FRA)	100

Repechage		Bronze medal
Beka Gviniashvili (GEO)	000
Ryunosuke Haga (JPN)	000	Ryunosuke Haga (JPN)	100
		Artem Bloshenko (UKR)	000

=== Pool A ===
First round

Second round
Elmar Gasimov (AZE)	011
Tagir Khaibulaev (RUS)	000
Ivan Remarenco (UAE)	000
Lyès Bouyacoub (ALG)	010
Ramadan Darwish (EGY)	100
Dominic Dugasse (SEY)	000
Naidangiin Tüvshinbayar (MGL)	000
José Armenteros (CUB)	001

Third round
Elmar Gasimov (AZE)	010
Lyès Bouyacoub (ALG)	010
Ramadan Darwish (EGY)	001
José Armenteros (CUB)	000

Quarterfinals
Elmar Gasimov (AZE)	100
Ramadan Darwish (EGY)	000

=== Pool B ===
First round
Soyib Kurbonov (UZB)	000
Artem Bloshenko (UKR)	100

Second round
Martin Pacek (SWE)	000
Cho Gu-ham (KOR)	000
Artem Bloshenko (UKR)	100
Shah Hussain Shah (PAK)	000
Karl-Richard Frey (GER)	100
Miklós Cirjenics (HUN)	000
Yan Naing Soe (MYA)	002
Christopher George (TTO)	000

Third round
Cho Gu-ham (KOR)	000
Artem Bloshenko (UKR)	100
Karl-Richard Frey (GER)	100
Yan Naing Soe (MYA)	000

Quarterfinals
Artem Bloshenko (UKR)	011
Karl-Richard Frey (GER)	000

=== Pool C ===
First round

Second round
Cyrille Maret (FRA)	100
Ayouba Traoré (MLI)	000
Henk Grol (NED)	101
Kyle Reyes (CAN)	000
Toma Nikiforov (BEL)	100
Javad Mahjoub (IRI)	000
Beka Gviniashvili (GEO)	100
Benjamin Fletcher (GBR)	000

Third round
Cyrille Maret (FRA)	001
Henk Grol (NED)	000
Toma Nikiforov (BEL)	000
Beka Gviniashvili (GEO)	101

Quarterfinals
Cyrille Maret (FRA)	010
Beka Gviniashvili (GEO)	000

=== Pool D ===
First round
Mohammad Tawfiq Bakhshi (AFG)	000
Jorge Fonseca (POR)	100

Second round
Lukáš Krpálek (CZE)	010
Jorge Fonseca (POR)	001
Grigori Minaškin (EST)	000
Maxim Rakov (KAZ)	000
Ryunosuke Haga (JPN)	100
Jevgeņijs Borodavko (LAT)	000
Rafael Buzacarini (BRA)	100
Pablo Aprahamian (URU)	000

Third round
Lukáš Krpálek (CZE)	000
Maxim Rakov (KAZ)	000
Ryunosuke Haga (JPN)	000
Rafael Buzacarini (BRA)	000

Quarterfinals
Lukáš Krpálek (CZE)	000
Ryunosuke Haga (JPN)	000
