= Mukhammadkarim Khurramov =

Uzbekistani judoka (born 1997)

Personal information
- Born: 4 April 1997 (age 29)
- Occupation: Judoka

Sport
- Country: Uzbekistan
- Sport: Judo
- Weight class: ‍–‍90 kg, ‍–‍100 kg

Achievements and titles
- Olympic Games: R16 (2020)
- World Champ.: R16 (2018, 2021)
- Asian Champ.: (silver) (2021)
Medal record
Men's judo
Representing Uzbekistan
Asian Championships
Silver medal – second place	2021 Bishkek	‍–‍100 kg
Bronze medal – third place	2017 Hong Kong	‍–‍90 kg
Bronze medal – third place	2019 Fujairah	‍–‍100 kg
IJF Grand Slam
Gold medal – first place	2020 Düsseldorf	‍–‍100 kg
IJF Grand Prix
Bronze medal – third place	2016 Tashkent	‍–‍90 kg
Bronze medal – third place	2019 Marrakesh	‍–‍100 kg
Bronze medal – third place	2019 Tbilisi	‍–‍100 kg
Asian Cadet Championships
Gold medal – first place	2014 Hong Kong	‍–‍81 kg
Silver medal – second place	2013 Hainan	‍–‍81 kg
Summer Universiade
Bronze medal – third place	2019 Naples	+90 kg

Profile at external databases
- IJF: 25433
- JudoInside.com: 48358
- Updated on 21 November 2022

Mukhammadkarim Khurramov (born 4 April 1997) is an Uzbek judoka.

Khurramov is the gold medalist of the 2020 Judo Grand Slam Düsseldorf in the ‍–‍100 kg class and represented Uzbekistan at the 2020 Summer Olympics.
