= Judo at the 2020 Summer Olympics =

Judo Judo at the Games of the XXXII Olympiad
- Venue: Nippon Budokan
- Location: Tokyo, Japan
- Dates: 24–31 July 2021
- Competitors: 393 (200 men and 193 women) from 128 nations

Competition at external databases
- Links: IJF • JudoInside

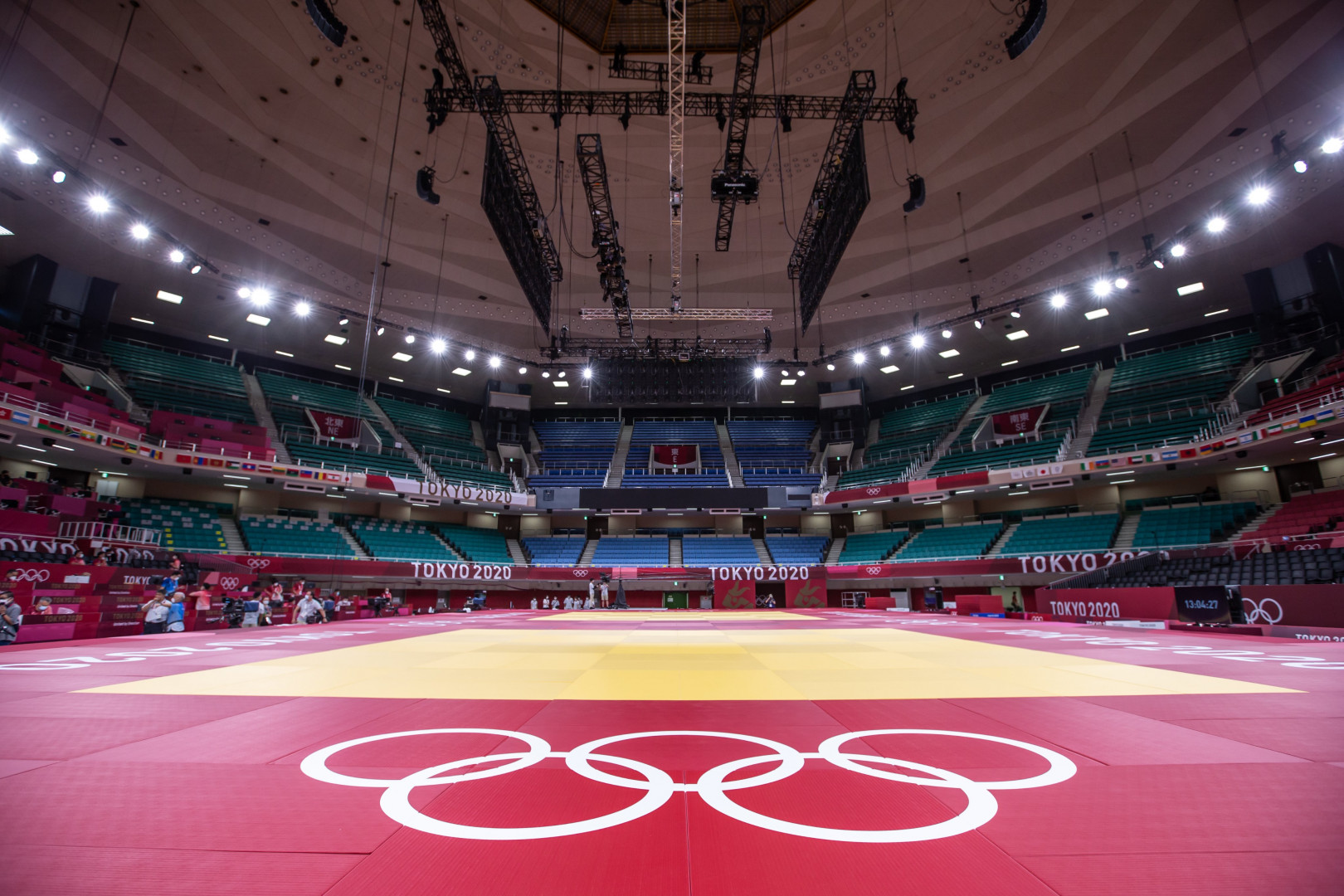

Judo was a sport at the 2020 Summer Olympics in Tokyo, and featured around 393 judoka (柔道家: judo practitioners) competing in 15 events, seven each for both men and women as well as a new mixed team event. The 2020 Summer Olympics were postponed due to the COVID-19 pandemic, and the judo competitions were held in July 2021 at Nippon Budokan.

The tournament brackets were drawn on 23 July, with the top 8 judoka in each weight class seeded.

== Qualification ==
A total of 393, 128 athletes could qualify for judo at the 2020 Summer Olympics. The 2020 Summer Olympics were postponed to 2021 due to the COVID-19 pandemic. Each National Olympic Committee (NOC) could enter a maximum of 14 judokas (one in each division). Host nation Japan had reserved a spot in each of the 14 events, while twenty were made available to NOCs through a Tripartite Commission Invitation.

The remaining judoka underwent a qualifying process to earn a spot for the Games through the world ranking list prepared by International Judo Federation on June 28, 2021, and finalized on 5 July.

The top 18 athletes in each division directly qualify, though each NOC is subjected to a limit of 1 judoka per division. If the NOC contains more than a single athlete ranked in the top 18 of the world ranking list, the NOC can decide which of their athletes obtain the quota places.

Further continental quotas (13 men and 12 women for Europe, 12 of each gender for Africa, 10 men and 11 women for Pan America, 10 of each gender for Asia, and 5 of each gender for Oceania are also available. These quotas are assigned by creating a list of all athletes for each continent across all divisions and both genders. The top-ranked athletes qualify in turn, subject to the general rule of 1 athlete per NOC per division as well as the additional rule that each NOC may only qualify one judoka through the continental quotas (that is, ensuring that 100 different NOCs are represented through this qualification system).

Mixed team qualification was based on NOCs qualifying enough individual judokas across various divisions to have a six-person team meeting specific requirements (one man and one woman in each of three groups of divisions).

Gender	Day	1	2	3	4	5	6	7
Men	Weight class	60	66	73	81	90	100	+100
Men	Participants	23	27	36	35	33	25	22
Women	Weight class	48	52	57	63	70	78	+78
Women	Participants	28	29	25	31	28	24	27

== Competition schedule ==
Q	Elimination & Quarterfinal	F	Repechage, Semifinal, Bronze medal & Gold medal

Event↓/Date →	Sat 24		Sun 25		Mon 26		Tue 27		Wed 28		Thu 29		Fri 30		Sat 31	
Men's
Men's 60 kg	Q	F														
Men's 66 kg			Q	F												
Men's 73 kg					Q	F										
Men's 81 kg							Q	F								
Men's 90 kg									Q	F						
Men's 100 kg											Q	F				
Men's +100 kg													Q	F		
Women's
Women's 48 kg	Q	F														
Women's 52 kg			Q	F												
Women's 57 kg					Q	F										
Women's 63 kg							Q	F								
Women's 70 kg									Q	F						
Women's 78 kg											Q	F				
Women's +78 kg													Q	F		
Mixed team
Mixed team															Q	F

== Participating nations ==
- Albania (1)
- Algeria (2)
- Angola (1)
- Argentina (2)
- Armenia (1)
- Australia (3)
- Austria (6)
- Azerbaijan (9)
- Belarus (3)
- Belgium (4)
- Benin (1)
- Bhutan (1)
- Bosnia and Herzegovina (1)
- Brazil (13)
- Bulgaria (3)
- Burkina Faso (1)
- Cameroon (2)
- Canada (6)
- Cape Verde (1)
- Chad (1)
- Chile (1)
- China (6)
- Colombia (1)
- Comoros (1)
- Costa Rica (1)
- Croatia (3)
- Cuba (6)
- Czech Republic (2)
- Ivory Coast (1)
- Democratic Republic of the Congo (1)
- Denmark (1)
- Djibouti (1)
- Dominican Republic (1)
- Ecuador (3)
- Egypt (3)
- Estonia (1)
- Fiji (1)
- France (13)
- Gabon (1)
- The Gambia (1)
- Georgia (9)
- Germany (13)
- Ghana (1)
- Great Britain (6)
- Greece (2)
- Guam (1)
- Guatemala (1)
- Guinea (1)
- Guinea-Bissau (1)
- Haiti (1)
- Honduras (1)
- Hungary (7)
- Refugee Olympic Team (6)
- India (1)
- Ireland (2)
- Israel (12)
- Italy (8)
- Jamaica (1)
- Japan (14)
- Jordan (1)
- Kazakhstan (6)
- Kiribati (1)
- Kosovo (5)
- Kyrgyzstan (1)
- Laos (1)
- Latvia (1)
- Lebanon (1)
- Libya (1)
- Liechtenstein (1)
- Lithuania (1)
- Madagascar (1)
- Malawi (1)
- Mauritius (1)
- Mexico (1)
- Monaco (1)
- Mongolia (12)
- Montenegro (1)
- Morocco (2)
- Mozambique (1)
- Nepal (1)
- Netherlands (10)
- Nicaragua (1)
- Niger (1)
- North Macedonia (1)
- Pakistan (1)
- Palestine (1)
- Panama (2)
- Peru (1)
- Philippines (1)
- Poland (6)
- Portugal (8)
- Puerto Rico (3)
- Qatar (1)
- South Korea (13)
- Moldova (2)
- Romania (3)
- ROC (13)
- Samoa (1)
- San Marino (1)
- Saudi Arabia (1)
- Senegal (1)
- Serbia (5)
- Seychelles (1)
- Sierra Leone (1)
- Slovenia (5)
- South Africa (1)
- Spain (7)
- Sri Lanka (1)
- Sudan (1)
- Sweden (4)
- Switzerland (2)
- Chinese Taipei (3)
- Tajikistan (4)
- Thailand (1)
- Trinidad and Tobago (1)
- Tunisia (3)
- Turkey (6)
- Turkmenistan (1)
- Ukraine (7)
- United Arab Emirates (2)
- United States (4)
- Uruguay (1)
- Uzbekistan (10)
- Vanuatu (1)
- Venezuela (3)
- Vietnam (1)
- Yemen (1)
- Zambia (1)

== Medal summary ==
=== Medal table ===
* Host nation (Japan)

Rank	NOC	Gold	Silver	Bronze	Total
1	Japan*	9	2	1	12
2	France	2	3	3	8
3	Kosovo	2	0	0	2
4	Georgia	1	3	0	4
5	Czech Republic	1	0	0	1
6	Germany	0	1	2	3
6	Mongolia	0	1	2	3
6	South Korea	0	1	2	3
9	Austria	0	1	1	2
10	Chinese Taipei	0	1	0	1
10	Cuba	0	1	0	1
10	Slovenia	0	1	0	1
13	ROC	0	0	3	3
14	Brazil	0	0	2	2
14	Canada	0	0	2	2
14	Italy	0	0	2	2
17	Azerbaijan	0	0	1	1
17	Belgium	0	0	1	1
17	Great Britain	0	0	1	1
17	Hungary	0	0	1	1
17	Israel	0	0	1	1
17	Kazakhstan	0	0	1	1
17	Netherlands	0	0	1	1
17	Portugal	0	0	1	1
17	Ukraine	0	0	1	1
17	Uzbekistan	0	0	1	1
Totals (26 entries)		15	15	30	60

=== Men's events ===
Games	Gold	Silver	Bronze
Extra-lightweight (60 kg)	Naohisa Takato; Japan	Yang Yung-wei; Chinese Taipei	Yeldos Smetov; Kazakhstan
Extra-lightweight (60 kg)	Naohisa Takato; Japan	Yang Yung-wei; Chinese Taipei	Luka Mkheidze; France
Half-lightweight (66 kg)	Hifumi Abe; Japan	Vazha Margvelashvili; Georgia	An Ba-ul; South Korea
Half-lightweight (66 kg)	Hifumi Abe; Japan	Vazha Margvelashvili; Georgia	Daniel Cargnin; Brazil
Lightweight (73 kg)	Shohei Ono; Japan	Lasha Shavdatuashvili; Georgia	An Chang-rim; South Korea
Lightweight (73 kg)	Shohei Ono; Japan	Lasha Shavdatuashvili; Georgia	Tsend-Ochiryn Tsogtbaatar; Mongolia
Half-middleweight (81 kg)	Takanori Nagase; Japan	Saeid Mollaei; Mongolia	Shamil Borchashvili; Austria
Half-middleweight (81 kg)	Takanori Nagase; Japan	Saeid Mollaei; Mongolia	Matthias Casse; Belgium
Middleweight (90 kg)	Lasha Bekauri; Georgia	Eduard Trippel; Germany	Davlat Bobonov; Uzbekistan
Middleweight (90 kg)	Lasha Bekauri; Georgia	Eduard Trippel; Germany	Krisztián Tóth; Hungary
Half-heavyweight (100 kg)	Aaron Wolf; Japan	Cho Gu-ham; South Korea	Jorge Fonseca; Portugal
Half-heavyweight (100 kg)	Aaron Wolf; Japan	Cho Gu-ham; South Korea	Niyaz Ilyasov; ROC
Heavyweight (+100 kg)	Lukáš Krpálek; Czech Republic	Guram Tushishvili; Georgia	Teddy Riner; France
Heavyweight (+100 kg)	Lukáš Krpálek; Czech Republic	Guram Tushishvili; Georgia	Tamerlan Bashaev; ROC

=== Women's events ===
Games	Gold	Silver	Bronze
Extra-lightweight (48 kg)	Distria Krasniqi; Kosovo	Funa Tonaki; Japan	Daria Bilodid; Ukraine
Extra-lightweight (48 kg)	Distria Krasniqi; Kosovo	Funa Tonaki; Japan	Mönkhbatyn Urantsetseg; Mongolia
Half-lightweight (52 kg)	Uta Abe; Japan	Amandine Buchard; France	Odette Giuffrida; Italy
Half-lightweight (52 kg)	Uta Abe; Japan	Amandine Buchard; France	Chelsie Giles; Great Britain
Lightweight (57 kg)	Nora Gjakova; Kosovo	Sarah-Léonie Cysique; France	Jessica Klimkait; Canada
Lightweight (57 kg)	Nora Gjakova; Kosovo	Sarah-Léonie Cysique; France	Tsukasa Yoshida; Japan
Half-middleweight (63 kg)	Clarisse Agbegnenou; France	Tina Trstenjak; Slovenia	Maria Centracchio; Italy
Half-middleweight (63 kg)	Clarisse Agbegnenou; France	Tina Trstenjak; Slovenia	Catherine Beauchemin-Pinard; Canada
Middleweight (70 kg)	Chizuru Arai; Japan	Michaela Polleres; Austria	Madina Taimazova; ROC
Middleweight (70 kg)	Chizuru Arai; Japan	Michaela Polleres; Austria	Sanne van Dijke; Netherlands
Half-heavyweight (78 kg)	Shori Hamada; Japan	Madeleine Malonga; France	Anna-Maria Wagner; Germany
Half-heavyweight (78 kg)	Shori Hamada; Japan	Madeleine Malonga; France	Mayra Aguiar; Brazil
Heavyweight (+78 kg)	Akira Sone; Japan	Idalys Ortiz; Cuba	Iryna Kindzerska; Azerbaijan
Heavyweight (+78 kg)	Akira Sone; Japan	Idalys Ortiz; Cuba	Romane Dicko; France

=== Mixed events ===
Games	Gold	Silver	Bronze
Mixed team	France; Clarisse Agbegnenou; Amandine Buchard; Guillaume Chaine; Axel Clerget; Sarah-Léonie Cysique; Romane Dicko; Alexandre Iddir; Kilian Le Blouch; Madeleine Malonga; Margaux Pinot; Teddy Riner	Japan; Hifumi Abe; Uta Abe; Chizuru Arai; Shori Hamada; Hisayoshi Harasawa; Shoichiro Mukai; Takanori Nagase; Shohei Ono; Akira Sone; Miku Tashiro; Aaron Wolf; Tsukasa Yoshida	Israel; Tohar Butbul; Raz Hershko; Li Kochman; Inbar Lanir; Sagi Muki; Timna Nelson-Levy; Peter Paltchik; Shira Rishony; Or Sasson; Gili Sharir; Baruch Shmailov
Mixed team	France; Clarisse Agbegnenou; Amandine Buchard; Guillaume Chaine; Axel Clerget; Sarah-Léonie Cysique; Romane Dicko; Alexandre Iddir; Kilian Le Blouch; Madeleine Malonga; Margaux Pinot; Teddy Riner	Japan; Hifumi Abe; Uta Abe; Chizuru Arai; Shori Hamada; Hisayoshi Harasawa; Shoichiro Mukai; Takanori Nagase; Shohei Ono; Akira Sone; Miku Tashiro; Aaron Wolf; Tsukasa Yoshida	Germany; Johannes Frey; Karl-Richard Frey; Jasmin Grabowski; Katharina Menz; Dominic Ressel; Giovanna Scoccimarro; Sebastian Seidl; Theresa Stoll; Martyna Trajdos; Eduard Trippel; Anna-Maria Wagner; Igor Wandtke

== New rules ==
Judo, since the sport's introduction in the 1964 Tokyo Olympics, has changed and evolved over time. There were several rule changes made in the 2020 Summer Olympics.

Based on the 2016 IJF Judo rule changes, the time for men's bouts is four minutes, the same as women's bouts.

There was also a change in scores of a Waza-Ari, a technique that requires a judoka to pin his/her opponent for 10 to 20 seconds or to throw the opponent successfully but not well-controlled to be awarded as Ippon.

As basic Judo rules, there are three ways to win: 1) to throw the opponent to the ground in a certain efficiency, 2) to hold down the opponent for 20 seconds, 3) to force the opponent to submission by arm lock or strangulation.

Originally, gaining points of Ippon ended the bout, but now Waza-aris are awarded equal to Ippons. With this rule change, penalty scores no longer end the bout.

In addition, the mixed team competition was added: six individuals in their national team compete against individuals of the same weight category from another national team. A team wins when it has won four rounds. This new content aims to engage in gender equality, as well as a union through sport.

In addition, the mixed team competition was added as a new content of Judo games in the Olympics. Six individuals in their national mixed team compete with individuals of the same weight category from another national team. A team wins when it won at least four rounds of six. This new content aims to engage in gender equality as well as a union through sport. It is considered one of the most gender equal competition in Olympic games France, the next Summer Olympics' host country, became the first team to win a gold medal in this new competition for mixed teams, defeating Japan 4-1. This was considered as a memorable moment for judo in the 2020 Summer Olympics.

== Politically motivated withdrawal ==
Selected to compete at the 2020 Summer Games in the -73 kg weight class, Algerian judoka Fethi Nourine and his coach Amar Benikhlef announced his withdrawal following the conclusion of the draw of competitors.

Nourine was quoted as saying his political support for gaza made it impossible for him to compete against an Israeli; Tohar Butbul, the #5 seed in the tournament, whom he was drawn to potentially face in the second round (had he won in the first round), was Israeli.

The International Judo Federation (IJF) announced the immediate suspension of Nourine and his coach on 24 July 2021, pending a further investigation, while the Algerian Olympic Committee revoked their accreditation, and sent Nourine and his coach back home to Algeria. The Federation explained:

"According to the IJF rules, in line with the Olympic Charter and especially with rule 50.2 that provides for the protection of the neutrality of sport at the Olympic Games and the neutrality of the Games themselves, which states that 'no kind of demonstration or political, religious or racial propaganda is permitted in any Olympic sites, venues or other areas,' Fethi Nourine and Amar Benikhlef are now suspended and will face a decision by the IJF Disciplinary Commission, as well as disciplinary sanctions by the National Olympic Committee of Algeria back in their country.'"

== See also ==
- Judo at the 2018 Asian Games
- Judo at the 2019 Pan American Games
- Judo at the 2020 Summer Paralympics
- Judo wrap-up from the Tokyo 2020 Olympics
