= Christopher George (judoka) =

Judoka from Trinidad and Tobago

Personal information
- Born: 25 December 1983 (age 42) Port of Spain, Trinidad and Tobago

Sport
- Sport: Judo
Medal record
Representing Trinidad and Tobago
Central American and Caribbean Games
Bronze medal – third place	2014 Veracruz	-100kg

Christopher George (born December 25, 1983) is a judoka from Trinidad and Tobago. He competed at the 2016 Summer Olympics in the men's 100 kg event, in which he was eliminated in the second round by Yan Naing Soe.
