= Niyaz Ilyasov =

Russian judoka (born 1995)

Personal information
- Full name: Niyaz Anvarovich Ilyasov
- Nationality: Russian
- Born: 10 August 1995 (age 30) Bataysk, Rostov Oblast, Russia
- Occupation: Judoka
- Military career
- Allegiance: Russia
- Branch: Russian Armed Forces
- Rank: Senior lieutenant

Sport
- Country: Russia
- Sport: Judo
- Weight class: –100 kg

Achievements and titles
- Olympic Games: (bronze) (2020)
- World Champ.: (silver) (2019)
- European Champ.: 5th (2021)
Medal record
Men's judo
Representing ROC
Olympic Games
Bronze medal – third place	2020 Tokyo	‍–‍100 kg
Representing Russia
World Championships
Silver medal – second place	2019 Tokyo	‍–‍100 kg
Bronze medal – third place	2018 Baku	‍–‍100 kg
World Masters
Bronze medal – third place	2019 Qingdao	‍–‍100 kg
IJF Grand Slam
Gold medal – first place	2018 Ekaterinburg	‍–‍100 kg
Gold medal – first place	2020 Budapest	‍–‍100 kg
Silver medal – second place	2017 Ekaterinburg	‍–‍100 kg
Bronze medal – third place	2021 Tel Aviv	‍–‍100 kg
IJF Grand Prix
Gold medal – first place	2018 Zagreb	‍–‍100 kg
Silver medal – second place	2017 Tashkent	‍–‍100 kg
Silver medal – second place	2019 Perth	‍–‍100 kg
Bronze medal – third place	2017 Antalya	‍–‍100 kg
European U23 Championships
Bronze medal – third place	2016 Tel Aviv	‍–‍100 kg
Bronze medal – third place	2017 Podgorica	‍–‍100 kg
World Juniors Championships
Gold medal – first place	2015 Abu Dhabi	‍–‍100 kg
Silver medal – second place	2014 Fort Lauderdale	‍–‍100 kg
European Junior Championships
Gold medal – first place	2014 Bucharest	‍–‍100 kg
Bronze medal – third place	2015 Oberwart	‍–‍100 kg

Profile at external databases
- IJF: 17400
- JudoInside.com: 67535
- Updated on 23 May 2023

Niyaz Anvarovich Ilyasov (Russian: Нияз Анварович Ильясов, IPA: [nʲɪˈjas ɪˈlʲjasəf]; born 10 August 1995) is a Russian judoka of Turkish Meskhetian heritage.

He participated at the 2018 World Judo Championships, winning a medal.

Ilyasov is a senior lieutenant of the Russian Armed Forces. He is the member of the army sports club CSKA Moscow and a medal winner from the Military World Games.
