= Pablo Aprahamian =

Uruguayan judoka (born 1985)

Personal information
- Full name: Pablo Alejandro Aprahamian Bakerdjian
- Nationality: Uruguayan
- Born: 13 September 1985 (age 40)

Sport
- Sport: Judo
Medal record
Representing Uruguay
Pan American Championships
Bronze medal – third place	2017 Panama	–100 kg

Pablo Alejandro Aprahamian Bakerdjian (born September 13, 1985) is a Uruguayan judoka. He competed at the 2016 Summer Olympics in the men's 100 kg event, in which he was eliminated in the second round by Rafael Buzacarini.

His brother Mikael is also a judoka.
