= Grigori Minaškin =

Estonian judoka (born 1991)

Personal information
- Born: 1 February 1991 (age 35)
- Occupation: Judoka

Sport
- Country: Estonia
- Sport: Judo
- Weight class: ‍–‍100 kg

Achievements and titles
- Olympic Games: R32 (2016, 2020)
- World Champ.: R32 (2015, 2017, 2018, 2019, 2021, 2022)
- European Champ.: (bronze) (2016)
Medal record
Men's judo
Representing Estonia
European Championships
Bronze medal – third place	2016 Kazan	‍–‍100 kg
IJF Grand Slam
Bronze medal – third place	2021 Antalya	‍–‍100 kg
IJF Grand Prix
Silver medal – second place	2019 Budapest	‍–‍100 kg
Bronze medal – third place	2019 Tel Aviv	‍–‍100 kg
European U23 Championships
Bronze medal – third place	2013 Samokov	‍–‍100 kg
World Juniors Championships
Bronze medal – third place	2009 Paris	‍–‍90 kg
European Junior Championships
Silver medal – second place	2009 Yerevan	‍–‍90 kg
Bronze medal – third place	2010 Samokov	‍–‍90 kg
European Cadet Championships
Gold medal – first place	2007 Valletta	‍–‍81 kg

Profile at external databases
- IJF: 1094
- JudoInside.com: 56249
- Updated on 21 May 2023

Grigori Minaškin (born 1 February 1991) is an Estonian judoka. He competed at the 2016 Summer Olympics in the men's 100 kg event, in which he was eliminated in the second round by Maxim Rakov and at the 2020 Summer Olympics in the men's 100 kg event, in which he was eliminated in the first round by Lkhagvasürengiin Otgonbaatar.
