= Cho Gu-ham =

South Korean judoka (born 1992)

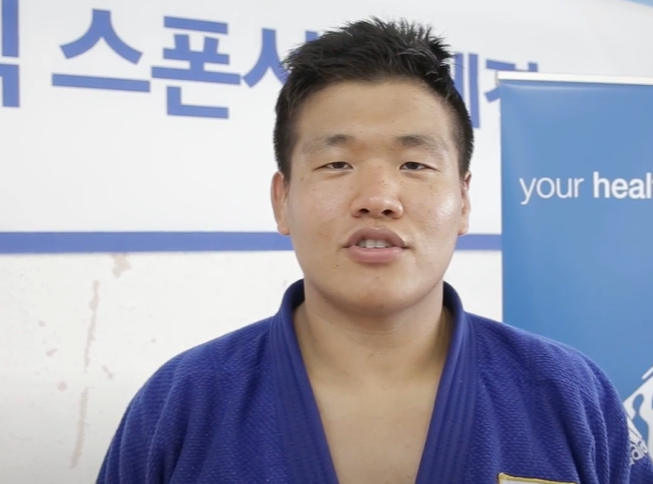
- Cho in 2016

Personal information
- Nationality: South Korean
- Born: 30 July 1992 (age 34) Gangwon, South Korea
- Occupation: Judoka
- Height: 1.78 m (5 ft 10 in)

Korean name
- Hangul: 조구함
- RR: Jo Guham
- MR: Cho Kuham

Sport
- Country: South Korea
- Sport: Judo
- Weight class: –100 kg
- Retired: 26 December 2022

Achievements and titles
- Olympic Games: (silver) (2020)
- World Champ.: (gold) (2018)
- Asian Champ.: (silver) (2018)
Medal record
Men's judo
Representing South Korea
Olympic Games
| Silver medal – second place | 2020 Tokyo | ‍–‍100 kg |
World Championships
| Gold medal – first place | 2018 Baku | ‍–‍100 kg |
Asian Games
| Silver medal – second place | 2018 Jakarta | ‍–‍100 kg |
| Bronze medal – third place | 2014 Incheon | ‍–‍100 kg |
Asian Championships
| Bronze medal – third place | 2013 Bangkok | +100 kg |
IJF Grand Slam
| Gold medal – first place | 2014 Tokyo | ‍–‍100 kg |
| Gold medal – first place | 2017 Tokyo | ‍–‍100 kg |
| Gold medal – first place | 2019 Abu Dhabi | ‍–‍100 kg |
| Silver medal – second place | 2011 Tokyo | +100 kg |
| Silver medal – second place | 2015 Tokyo | ‍–‍100 kg |
| Silver medal – second place | 2018 Paris | ‍–‍100 kg |
| Silver medal – second place | 2019 Düsseldorf | ‍–‍100 kg |
| Bronze medal – third place | 2013 Paris | +100 kg |
| Bronze medal – third place | 2019 Paris | ‍–‍100 kg |
| Bronze medal – third place | 2021 Kazan | ‍–‍100 kg |
IJF Grand Prix
| Gold medal – first place | 2014 Jeju | ‍–‍100 kg |
| Gold medal – first place | 2015 Jeju | ‍–‍100 kg |
| Gold medal – first place | 2018 Hohhot | ‍–‍100 kg |
| Gold medal – first place | 2019 Hohhot | ‍–‍100 kg |
| Bronze medal – third place | 2011 Qingdao | +100 kg |
| Bronze medal – third place | 2012 Düsseldorf | +100 kg |
| Bronze medal – third place | 2019 Budapest | ‍–‍100 kg |
World Juniors Championships
| Silver medal – second place | 2011 Cape Town | +100 kg |
| Bronze medal – third place | 2010 Agadir | +100 kg |
Asian Junior Championships
| Gold medal – first place | 2009 Beirut | +100 kg |
Summer Universiade
| Gold medal – first place | 2013 Kazan | +100 kg |
| Gold medal – first place | 2015 Gwangju | ‍–‍100 kg |
| Silver medal – second place | 2013 Kazan | Men's team |

Profile at external databases
- IJF: 9714
- JudoInside.com: 79322
- Updated on 23 May 2023

Cho Gu-ham (Korean: 조구함; born 30 July 1992) is a South Korean retired judoka. He competed at the 2016 Summer Olympics in the men's 100 kg event, in which he was eliminated in the third round by Artem Bloshenko.
