= Aaron Wolf (judoka) =

Japanese judoka (born 1996)

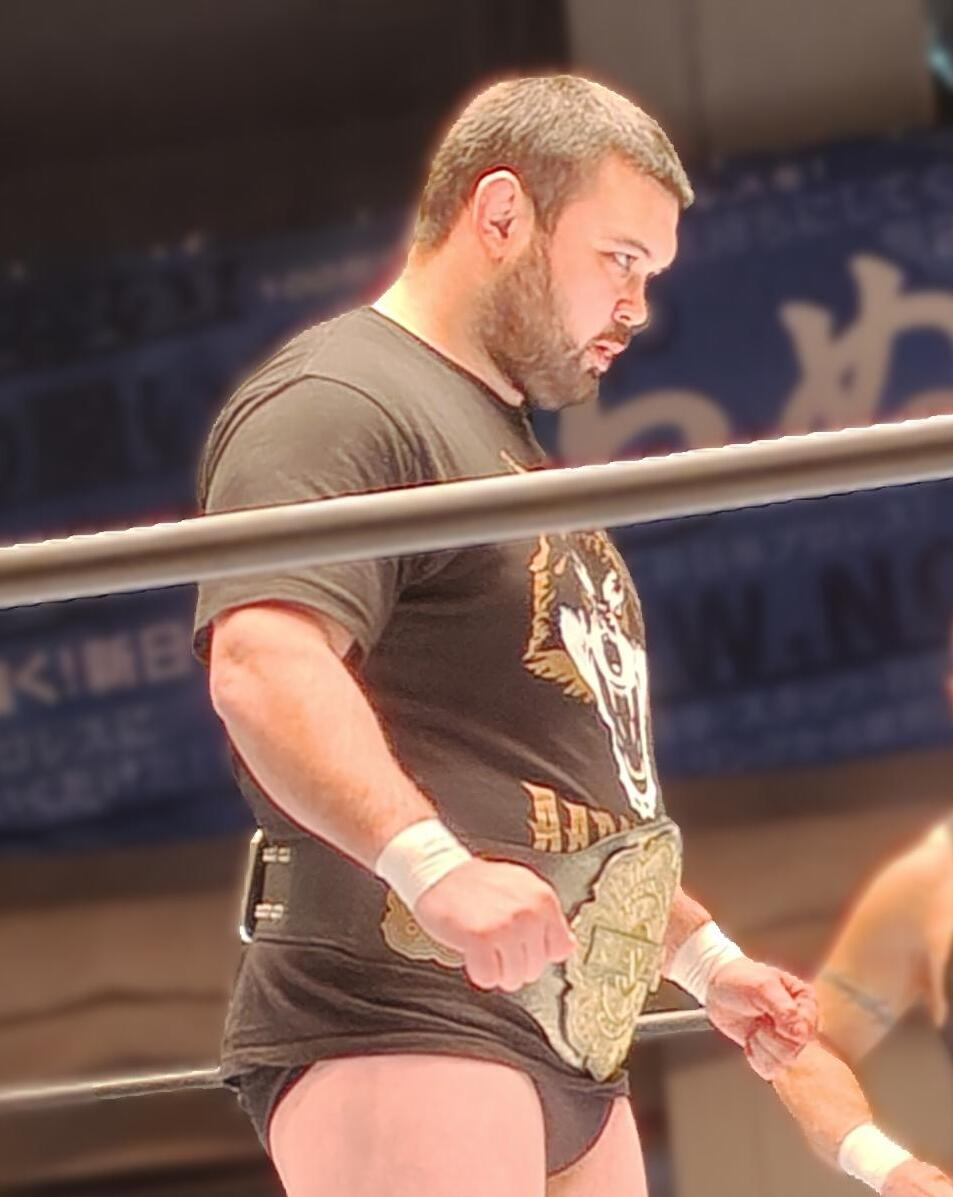
- Wolf in 2026

Personal information
- Born: 25 February 1996 (age 30) Shin-Koiwa, Japan
- Education: Tokai University
- Occupation: Judoka
- Height: 1.81 m (5 ft 11 in)

Sport
- Country: Japan
- Sport: Judo
- Weight class: ‍–‍100 kg
- Rank: 5th dan black belt

Achievements and titles
- Olympic Games: (gold) (2020)
- World Champ.: (gold) (2017)
- Asian Champ.: (gold) (2021)
Medal record
Men's judo
Representing Japan
Olympic Games
Gold medal – first place	2020 Tokyo	‍–‍100 kg
Silver medal – second place	2020 Tokyo	Mixed team
Silver medal – second place	2024 Paris	Mixed team
World Championships
Gold medal – first place	2017 Budapest	‍–‍100 kg
Bronze medal – third place	2019 Tokyo	‍–‍100 kg
Asian Games
Gold medal – first place	2022 Hangzhou	Mixed team
Asian Championships
Gold medal – first place	2021 Bishkek	‍–‍100 kg
World Masters
Silver medal – second place	2019 Qingdao	‍–‍100 kg
IJF Grand Slam
Gold medal – first place	2018 Osaka	‍–‍100 kg
Gold medal – first place	2024 Paris	‍–‍100 kg
Gold medal – first place	2024 Astana	‍–‍100 kg
Silver medal – second place	2019 Paris	‍–‍100 kg
Silver medal – second place	2021 Antalya	‍–‍100 kg
Bronze medal – third place	2016 Paris	‍–‍100 kg
Bronze medal – third place	2016 Baku	‍–‍100 kg
Bronze medal – third place	2019 Osaka	‍–‍100 kg
Bronze medal – third place	2023 Ulaanbaatar	‍–‍100 kg
Bronze medal – third place	2024 Antalya	‍–‍100 kg
IJF Grand Prix
Gold medal – first place	2015 Ulaanbaatar	‍–‍100 kg
Gold medal – first place	2015 Tashkent	‍–‍100 kg
Gold medal – first place	2018 Budapest	‍–‍100 kg
Gold medal – first place	2019 Budapest	‍–‍100 kg
Silver medal – second place	2017 Düsseldorf	‍–‍100 kg
World Juniors Championships
Bronze medal – third place	2014 Fort Lauderdale	‍–‍100 kg
- Professional wrestling career
- Ring name: Aaron Wolf
- Billed height: 5 ft 11 in (180 cm)
- Billed weight: 220 lb (100 kg)
- Billed from: Shin-Koiwa, Japan
- Trained by: NJPW Dojo; Yuji Nagata
- Debut: January 4, 2026
- Updated on 4 January 2026

Aaron Phillip Wolf (ウルフ・アロン, Urufu Aron; Japanese surname: Kimura (木村); born 25 February 1996) is a Japanese professional wrestler and former judoka. He is signed to New Japan Pro-Wrestling (NJPW), where he is the current NEVER Openweight Champion in his second reign.

As a judoka, he won a gold medal at the 2017 World Championships in Budapest and a gold medal at the 2020 Summer Olympics. He is the son of a Japanese mother and an American father. He retired from judo in June 2025 to pursue a professional wrestling career and signed with NJPW.

== Judo career ==
Wolf became the first athlete of U.S. descent to win the All-Japan Judo Championships with his victory on 29 April 2019. On 15 May 2019 he was promoted to 5th dan.

Wolf qualified to represent Japan at the 2020 Summer Olympics, and won the gold medal in the 100 kg competition at the 2020 Olympics held in Tokyo, Japan.

Wolf retired from Judo competition in June 2025.

== Professional wrestling career ==
=== New Japan Pro-Wrestling (2025–present) ===
On June 22, 2025, Wolf started his professional wrestling career by signing and training with the promotion New Japan Pro-Wrestling (NJPW); it was also announced that he would make his in-ring debut at Wrestle Kingdom 20. He appeared at King of Pro-Wrestling on October 13, attacking members of House of Torture after their leader, Evil, won the NEVER Openweight Championship.

At Wrestle Kingdom 20 on January 4, 2026, Wolf defeated Evil to win the title in his debut match, but lost it to new House of Torture leader Ren Narita on February 11 at The New Beginning in Osaka. The following month, Wolf was eliminated by Don Fale in the first round of the New Japan Cup, but defeated him in a rematch on Night 1 of Wrestling Dontaku on May 3. At Dominion 6.14 in Osaka-jo Hall on June 14, Wolf regained the NEVER Openweight Championship from Narita. On June 23, Wolf defeated Yoshi-Hashi to qualify for the B-Block in his first G1 Climax tournament. He finished with eight points after four wins and five losses, failing to advance to the semi-finals. On October 12 at King of Pro-Wrestling, Wolf defeated Kosei Fujita in his successful title defense.

== Championships and accomplishments ==
- New Japan Pro-Wrestling
  - NEVER Openweight Championship (2 times, current)
