= Ryunosuke Haga =

Japanese judoka (born 1991)

Personal information
- Born: 28 April 1991 (age 35) Miyazaki, Japan
- Home town: Tokyo, Japan
- Education: Tokai University
- Occupation: Judoka
- Height: 186 cm (6 ft 1 in)

Sport
- Country: Japan
- Sport: Judo
- Weight class: ‍–‍100 kg
- Rank: 4th dan black belt
- Club: Asahi Kasei
- Coached by: Kosei Inoue, Keiji Suzuki
- Retired: 20 January 2025

Achievements and titles
- Olympic Games: (bronze) (2016)
- World Champ.: (gold) (2015)
Medal record
Men's judo
Representing Japan
Olympic Games
Bronze medal – third place	2016 Rio de Janeiro	‍–‍100 kg
World Championships
Gold medal – first place	2015 Astana	‍–‍100 kg
IJF Grand Slam
Gold medal – first place	2015 Tokyo	‍–‍100 kg
Gold medal – first place	2019 Osaka	‍–‍100 kg
Bronze medal – third place	2014 Tyumen	‍–‍100 kg
IJF Grand Prix
Gold medal – first place	2015 Düsseldorf	‍–‍100 kg
Gold medal – first place	2017 Hohhot	‍–‍100 kg
Silver medal – second place	2014 Budapest	‍–‍100 kg
Bronze medal – third place	2010 Qingdao	‍–‍100 kg
World Juniors Championships
Gold medal – first place	2010 Agadir	‍–‍100 kg
Summer Universiade
Gold medal – first place	2011 Shenzhen	‍–‍100 kg
Gold medal – first place	2011 Shenzhen	Men's team

Profile at external databases
- IJF: 3623
- JudoInside.com: 70366
- Updated on 24 May 2023

Ryunosuke Haga (羽賀 龍之介, Haga Ryunosuke; born 28 April 1991) is a male Japanese retired judoka and 2015 world champion in the under 100 kg division. His favoured technique is Uchi Mata.

Born in Miyazaki, Haga started judo at the age of 5. He won the gold medal in the ‍–‍100 kg weight class at the 2010 World Juniors Championships in Agadir.

In 2011, Haga won the Shenzhen Universiade. In 2015, he won the gold medal in the Half-heavyweight (100 kg) division at the 2015 World Championships.

Haga won the 2015 Tokyo Grand Slam and the 2015 Düsseldorf Grand Prix.

Bronze medalist in the 2016 Rio Olympics.

Haga's father, Yoshio, was also a judoka. Like his father who was a winner of the Kodokan Cup, he won the competition in 2010 and 2011. Furthermore, he maintains a decade-long friendship with Ōzeki Kirishima Tetsuo, a professional sumo wrestler.
