= Mikita Sviryd =

Croatian judoka (born 1996)

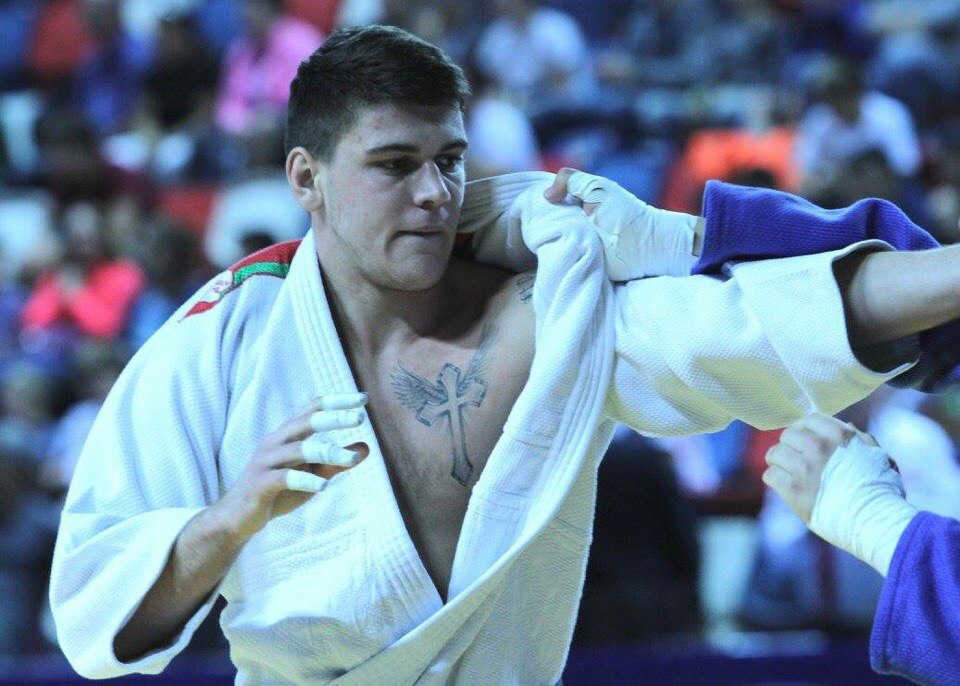

Personal information
- Born: 25 June 1996 (age 30)
- Occupation: Judoka

Sport
- Country: Belarus (until 2021); Croatia (since 2025)
- Sport: Judo
- Weight class: ‍–‍100 kg, +100 kg

Achievements and titles
- Olympic Games: R32 (2020)
- World Champ.: R16 (2018, 2019)
- European Champ.: R16 (2017, 2019, 2021, 2026)
Medal record
Men's judo
Representing Croatia
IJF Grand Slam
Bronze medal – third place	2026 Tashkent	+100 kg
IJF Grand Prix
Silver medal – second place	2026 Lima	+100 kg
Representing Belarus
IJF Grand Prix
Silver medal – second place	2018 The Hague	‍–‍100 kg
Bronze medal – third place	2019 Tashkent	‍–‍100 kg
European U23 Championships
Silver medal – second place	2016 Tel Aviv	‍–‍100 kg
Silver medal – second place	2017 Podgorica	‍–‍100 kg
European Junior Championships
Bronze medal – third place	2016 Málaga	‍–‍100 kg

Profile at external databases
- IJF: 13087, 87570
- JudoInside.com: 86884
- Updated on 17 August 2026

Mikita Sviryd (born 25 June 1996) is a Croatian judoka born in Belarus.

Sviryd is a silver medalist from the 2018 The Hague Grand Prix and represented Belarus at the 2020 Summer Olympics.
