= Benjamin Fletcher (judoka) =

Irish judoka

Ben Fletcher
Personal information
- Nationality: British, Irish
- Born: 13 March 1992 (age 34) Reading, England
- Occupation: Judoka
- Height: 185 cm (6 ft 1 in)

Sport
- Country: Great Britain (until Sep. 2017); Ireland (since Dec. 2017)
- Sport: Judo
- Weight class: –100 kg

Achievements and titles
- Olympic Games: R32 (2016, 2020)
- World Champ.: R16 (2015, 2019)
- European Champ.: 7th (2016)
Medal record
Men's judo
Representing Great Britain
IJF Grand Prix
Silver medal – second place	2017 Cancún	‍–‍100 kg
Bronze medal – third place	2015 Ulaanbaatar	‍–‍100 kg
World Juniors Championships
Bronze medal – third place	2011 Cape Town	‍–‍90 kg
Representing Ireland
IJF Grand Slam
Silver medal – second place	2018 Düsseldorf	‍–‍100 kg
Bronze medal – third place	2019 Baku	‍–‍100 kg
IJF Grand Prix
Gold medal – first place	2018 Tunis	‍–‍100 kg
Gold medal – first place	2019 Marrakesh	‍–‍100 kg
Silver medal – second place	2019 Tel Aviv	‍–‍100 kg
Silver medal – second place	2019 Hohhot	‍–‍100 kg
Bronze medal – third place	2018 Antalya	‍–‍100 kg

Profile at external databases
- IJF: 42352, 9564
- JudoInside.com: 49409
- Updated on 21 May 2023

Benjamin Karl Fletcher (born 13 March 1992) is a former British and now Irish judoka.

== Judo career ==
As a junior, Fletcher won bronze at the 2011 World Junior Championships in Cape Town. He is a three times champion of Great Britain, winning the half-heavyweight division at the British Judo Championships in 2013, 2014 and 2016.

In 2016, he was selected by Great Britain to compete at the 2016 Summer Olympics in the Men's -100 kg event, where he was defeated in his second round match.

In 2017, he changed his nationality to that of Ireland, after which he won the title at the 2017 Hong Kong Asian Open. He started 2018 by winning gold at the Tunis Grand Prix, becoming the first Judoka representing Ireland to ever win an IJF World Judo Tour event. He followed it up with more success that year taking silver at a prestigious Grand Slam event in Düsseldorf and bronze at the Antalya Grand Prix.

== Personal life ==
His sister Megan Fletcher is also an international judoka.
