= Toma Nikiforov =

Belgian judoka (born 1993)

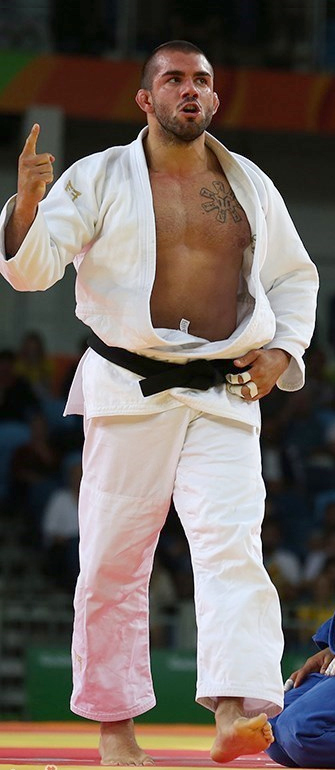
- Nikiforov at the 2016 Olympics

Personal information
- Nationality: Belgian
- Born: 25 January 1993 (age 33)
- Occupation: Judoka
- Height: 190 cm (6 ft 3 in)

Sport
- Country: Belgium
- Sport: Judo
- Weight class: ‍–‍100 kg, +100 kg
- Club: Royal Crossing Club de Schaerbeek
- Coached by: Damiano Martinuzzi (personal); Frederic Georgery (personal); Fabrice Flamand (national)
- Retired: 18 June 2025

Achievements and titles
- Olympic Games: R16 (2016, 2020)
- World Champ.: (silver) (2017)
- European Champ.: (gold) (2018, 2021)
Medal record
Men's judo
Representing Belgium
World Championships
Silver medal – second place	2017 Marrakesh	Open
Bronze medal – third place	2015 Astana	‍–‍100 kg
European Games
Bronze medal – third place	2015 Baku	‍–‍100 kg
European Championships
Gold medal – first place	2018 Tel Aviv	‍–‍100 kg
Gold medal – first place	2021 Lisbon	‍–‍100 kg
Silver medal – second place	2016 Kazan	‍–‍100 kg
World Masters
Bronze medal – third place	2015 Rabat	‍–‍100 kg
IJF Grand Slam
Gold medal – first place	2021 Tashkent	‍–‍100 kg
Gold medal – first place	2022 Paris	‍–‍100 kg
Silver medal – second place	2017 Abu Dhabi	‍–‍100 kg
Silver medal – second place	2018 Ekaterinburg	‍–‍100 kg
Bronze medal – third place	2015 Tyumen	‍–‍100 kg
Bronze medal – third place	2015 Abu Dhabi	‍–‍100 kg
Bronze medal – third place	2017 Tokyo	‍–‍100 kg
Bronze medal – third place	2021 Tbilisi	‍–‍100 kg
Bronze medal – third place	2025 Paris	+100 kg
IJF Grand Prix
Gold medal – first place	2014 Havana	‍–‍100 kg
Gold medal – first place	2017 Düsseldorf	‍–‍100 kg
Silver medal – second place	2014 Tashkent	‍–‍100 kg
Silver medal – second place	2019 Marrakesh	‍–‍100 kg
Bronze medal – third place	2014 Jeju	‍–‍100 kg
Bronze medal – third place	2019 Antalya	‍–‍100 kg
World Juniors Championships
Bronze medal – third place	2013 Ljubljana	‍–‍100 kg
European Junior Championships
Silver medal – second place	2012 Poreč	‍–‍100 kg
Bronze medal – third place	2011 Lommel	‍–‍100 kg
Bronze medal – third place	2013 Sarajevo	‍–‍100 kg
World Cadets Championships
Silver medal – second place	2009 Budapest	‍–‍90 kg
European Cadet Championships
Silver medal – second place	2009 Koper	‍–‍90 kg
Youth Olympic Games
Silver medal – second place	2010 Singapore	‍–‍100 kg

Profile at external databases
- IJF: 9520
- JudoInside.com: 48760
- Updated on 20 July 2025

Toma Nikiforov (born 25 January 1993) is a Belgian retired judoka who competed in the under and over 100 kg categories. He represented Belgium at three Olympic Games, finishing ninth in both Rio 2016 and Tokyo 2020. He won two senior European titles, first in ‍–‍100 kg in Tel Aviv 2018 and again in ‍–‍100 kg in Lisbon 2021. In 2015, he won bronze medals at the World Championships and European Games. He placed second at the 2016 European championships.

== Biography ==
Nikiforov is of Bulgarian origin. As a child, he lived above a judo club and he accompanied his father, who was a judoka. He won the silver medal at the 2010 Summer Youth Olympics. In 2015, he won the bronze medal at the European Championships and at the World Championships. In 2016, he won the silver medal at the European Championships.

He won the gold medal at the 2018 European Judo Championships in the -100 kg class, defeating Cyrille Maret in the final with an ippon.
