= Martin Pacek =

Swedish judoka (born 1987)

Personal information
- Born: 28 January 1987 (age 39)
- Occupation: Judoka

Sport
- Country: Sweden
- Sport: Judo
- Weight class: ‍–‍100 kg

Achievements and titles
- Olympic Games: R32 (2016)
- World Champ.: 5th (2014)
- European Champ.: R16 (× 7 times)
Medal record
Men's judo
Representing Sweden
World Masters
Bronze medal – third place	2016 Guadalajara	‍–‍100 kg
IJF Grand Slam
Gold medal – first place	2015 Tyumen	‍–‍100 kg
Gold medal – first place	2016 Tyumen	‍–‍100 kg
Bronze medal – third place	2013 Baku	‍–‍100 kg
Bronze medal – third place	2014 Tyumen	‍–‍100 kg
IJF Grand Prix
Gold medal – first place	2014 Qingdao	‍–‍100 kg
Gold medal – first place	2016 Tbilisi	‍–‍100 kg
Silver medal – second place	2013 Abu Dhabi	‍–‍100 kg
Silver medal – second place	2015 Ulaanbaatar	‍–‍100 kg
Silver medal – second place	2017 Tbilisi	‍–‍100 kg
Bronze medal – third place	2010 Rotterdam	‍–‍100 kg
Bronze medal – third place	2010 Qingdao	‍–‍100 kg
Bronze medal – third place	2013 Düsseldorf	‍–‍100 kg
Bronze medal – third place	2013 Rijeka	‍–‍100 kg
Bronze medal – third place	2013 Jeju	‍–‍100 kg
Bronze medal – third place	2014 Budapest	‍–‍100 kg
Bronze medal – third place	2014 Tashkent	‍–‍100 kg

Profile at external databases
- IJF: 19
- JudoInside.com: 32778
- Updated on 20 November 2022

Martin Pacek (born 28 April 1987 in Kristianstad) is a Swedish judoka. He competed at the 2016 Summer Olympics in the men's 100 kg event, in which he was eliminated in the second round by Cho Gu-ham.

== Personal life ==
Pacek's father Ryszard Pacek was a Polish Greco-Roman wrestler who emigrated to Sweden in the late 1970s. His younger brother Robin is also a judoka.
