= Artem Bloshenko =

Ukrainian judoka (born 1985)

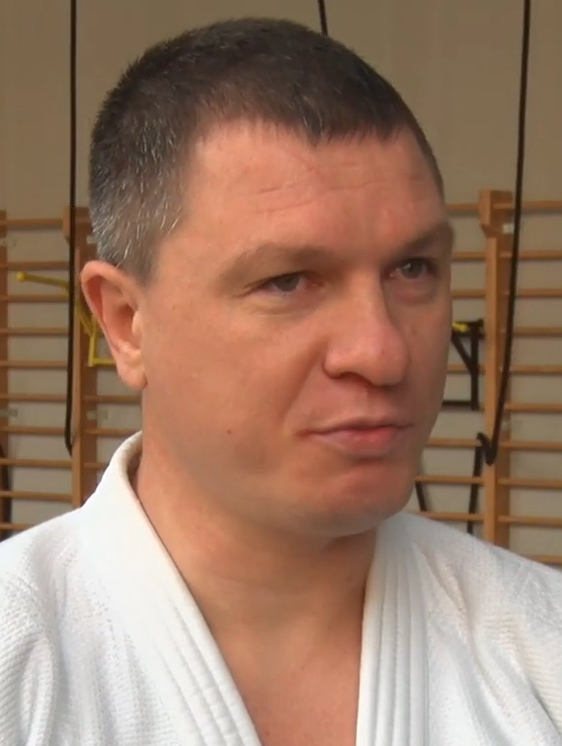
- Bloshenko in 2021

Personal information
- Born: 1 February 1985 (age 41) Donetsk, Ukrainian SSR, Soviet Union
- Occupation: Judoka
- Height: 187 cm (6 ft 2 in)

Sport
- Country: Ukraine
- Sport: Judo
- Weight class: ‍–‍100 kg
- Club: Sport Club Taifu-Judo
- Coached by: Vitaly Kharlamov; Petr Kudryavtsev

Achievements and titles
- Olympic Games: 5th (2016)
- World Champ.: 5th (2009)
- European Champ.: 5th (2010)
Medal record
Men's judo
Representing Ukraine
IJF Grand Slam
Bronze medal – third place	2014 Tokyo	‍–‍100 kg
IJF Grand Prix
Gold medal – first place	2014 Tbilisi	‍–‍100 kg
Gold medal – first place	2016 Havana	‍–‍100 kg
Silver medal – second place	2013 Jeju	‍–‍100 kg
Bronze medal – third place	2011 Qingdao	‍–‍100 kg
Bronze medal – third place	2015 Budapest	‍–‍100 kg
European U23 Championships
Gold medal – first place	2007 Salzburg	‍–‍100 kg
European Junior Championships
Silver medal – second place	2004 Sofia	‍–‍90 kg

Profile at external databases
- IJF: 674
- JudoInside.com: 16526
- Updated on 23 November 2022

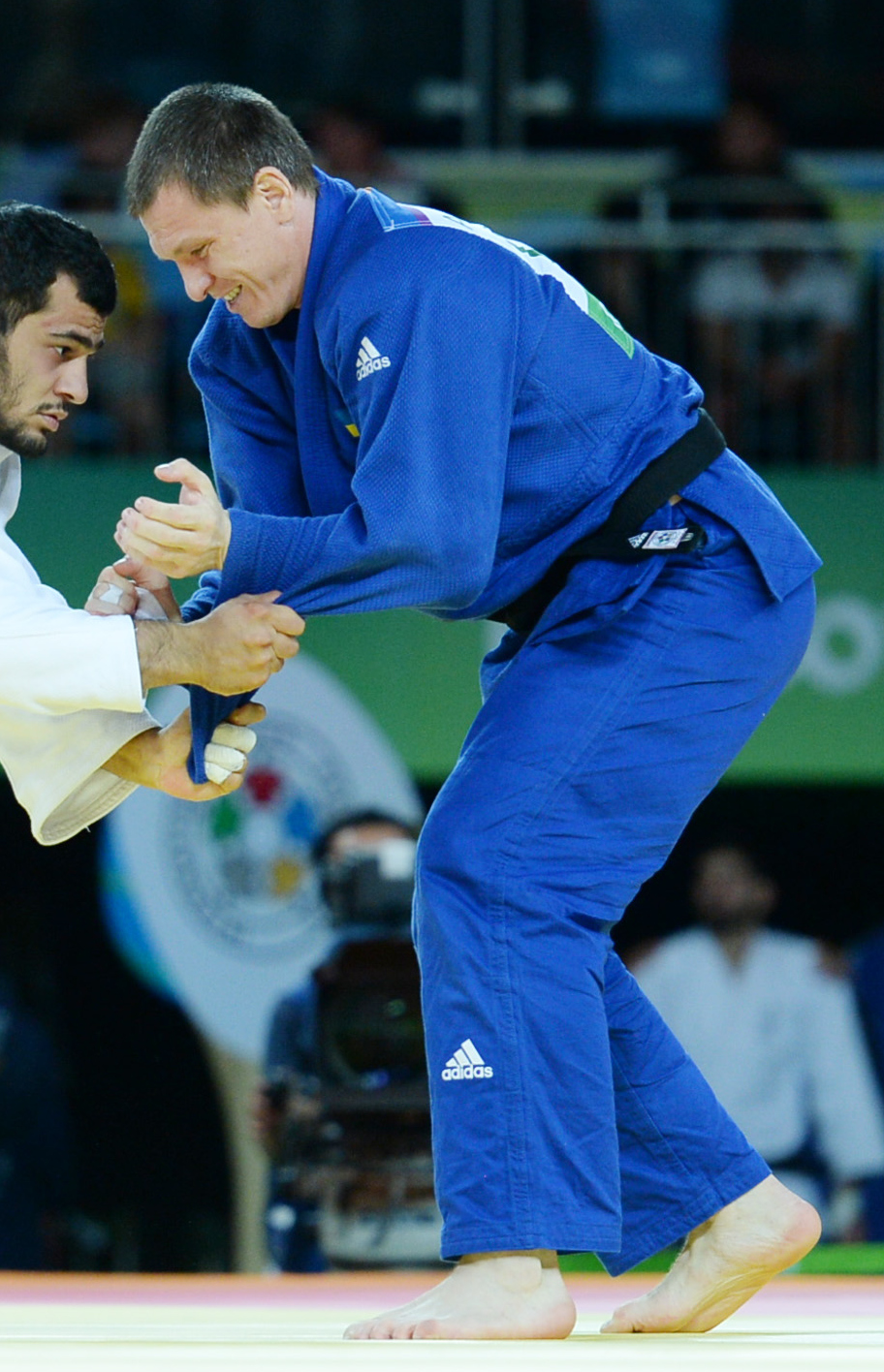
Bloshenko at the 2016 Olympics

Artem Oleksiyovych Bloshenko (Ukrainian: Артем Олексійович Блошенко; born 1 February 1985) is a Ukrainian heavyweight judoka who competed at the 2012 and 2016 Olympic Games.

Bloshenko graduated from Donetsk State Institute of Health, Physical Education and Sport. He is married to Ekaterina and has a son Maxim. His elder brother Andrei is also a competitive judoka.
