= Karl-Richard Frey =

German judoka (born 1991)

Personal information
- Nationality: German
- Born: 11 July 1991 (age 34) Troisdorf, Germany
- Occupation: Judoka
- Height: 188 cm (6 ft 2 in)
- Weight: 103 kg (227 lb)

Sport
- Country: Germany
- Sport: Judo
- Weight class: –100 kg

Achievements and titles
- Olympic Games: 5th (2016)
- World Champ.: (silver) (2015)
- European Champ.: 5th (2014)
Medal record
Men's judo
Representing Germany
Olympic Games
Bronze medal – third place	2020 Tokyo	Mixed team
World Championships
Silver medal – second place	2015 Astana	‍–‍100 kg
Bronze medal – third place	2014 Chelyabinsk	‍–‍100 kg
IJF Grand Slam
Silver medal – second place	2014 Abu Dhabi	‍–‍100 kg
Bronze medal – third place	2015 Tyumen	‍–‍100 kg
Bronze medal – third place	2015 Abu Dhabi	‍–‍100 kg
Bronze medal – third place	2016 Paris	‍–‍100 kg
Bronze medal – third place	2018 Abu Dhabi	‍–‍100 kg
IJF Grand Prix
Gold medal – first place	2013 Rijeka	‍–‍100 kg
Gold medal – first place	2013 Qingdao	‍–‍100 kg
Silver medal – second place	2014 Ulaanbaatar	‍–‍100 kg
Silver medal – second place	2014 Qingdao	‍–‍100 kg
Silver medal – second place	2015 Samsun	‍–‍100 kg
Silver medal – second place	2016 Havana	‍–‍100 kg
Silver medal – second place	2018 Budapest	‍–‍100 kg
Bronze medal – third place	2013 Tashkent	‍–‍100 kg
Bronze medal – third place	2013 Abu Dhabi	‍–‍100 kg
Bronze medal – third place	2014 Samsun	‍–‍100 kg
Bronze medal – third place	2015 Tbilisi	‍–‍100 kg
Bronze medal – third place	2018 Agadir	‍–‍100 kg
Bronze medal – third place	2018 Tashkent	‍–‍100 kg
Bronze medal – third place	2019 Hohhot	‍–‍100 kg
Bronze medal – third place	2020 Tel Aviv	‍–‍100 kg
European U23 Championships
Bronze medal – third place	2012 Prague	‍–‍100 kg
European Junior Championships
Gold medal – first place	2010 Samokov	‍–‍100 kg

Profile at external databases
- IJF: 3528
- JudoInside.com: 56181
- Updated on 21 May 2023

Karl-Richard Frey (born 11 July 1991) is a German judoka. He competed at the 2016 Summer Olympics in Rio de Janeiro, in the men's 100 kg. He finished in 5th place after losing to Cyrille Maret of France in the bronze medal match.
