= Jorge Fonseca =

Portuguese judoka (born 1992)

Personal information
- Full name: Jorge Ivayr Rodrigues da Fonseca
- Born: 30 October 1992 (age 33) São Tomé and Príncipe
- Occupation: Judoka
- Height: 1.74 m (5 ft 9 in)

Sport
- Country: Portugal
- Sport: Judo
- Weight class: ‍–‍100 kg
- Club: Sporting CP

Achievements and titles
- Olympic Games: (bronze) (2020)
- World Champ.: (gold) (2019, 2021)
- European Champ.: (bronze) (2020)
- Highest world ranking: 1st (2021)
Medal record
Men's judo
Representing Portugal
Olympic Games
Bronze medal – third place	2020 Tokyo	‍–‍100 kg
World Championships
Gold medal – first place	2019 Tokyo	‍–‍100 kg
Gold medal – first place	2021 Budapest	‍–‍100 kg
European Games
Silver medal – second place	2019 Minsk	Mixed team
European Championships
Bronze medal – third place	2020 Prague	‍–‍100 kg
IJF Grand Slam
Gold medal – first place	2022 Antalya	‍–‍100 kg
Gold medal – first place	2024 Antalya	‍–‍100 kg
Silver medal – second place	2022 Ulaanbaatar	‍–‍100 kg
Silver medal – second place	2026 Budapest	‍–‍100 kg
Bronze medal – third place	2015 Baku	‍–‍100 kg
Bronze medal – third place	2017 Paris	‍–‍100 kg
Bronze medal – third place	2018 Düsseldorf	‍–‍100 kg
Bronze medal – third place	2018 Osaka	‍–‍100 kg
Bronze medal – third place	2020 Budapest	‍–‍100 kg
Bronze medal – third place	2024 Astana	‍–‍100 kg
IJF Grand Prix
Gold medal – first place	2022 Almada	‍–‍100 kg
Silver medal – second place	2017 Zagreb	‍–‍100 kg
Silver medal – second place	2018 Agadir	‍–‍100 kg
Silver medal – second place	2023 Zagreb	‍–‍100 kg
Silver medal – second place	2024 Linz	‍–‍100 kg
Bronze medal – third place	2014 Zagreb	‍–‍100 kg
Bronze medal – third place	2015 Zagreb	‍–‍100 kg
Bronze medal – third place	2016 Tbilisi	‍–‍100 kg
Bronze medal – third place	2018 Tbilisi	‍–‍100 kg
Bronze medal – third place	2019 Zagreb	‍–‍100 kg
Bronze medal – third place	2026 Linz	‍–‍100 kg
European U23 Championships
Gold medal – first place	2013 Samokov	‍–‍100 kg
Bronze medal – third place	2014 Wrocław	‍–‍100 kg

Profile at external databases
- IJF: 9396
- JudoInside.com: 64713
- Updated on 13 September 2026

Jorge Ivayr Rodrigues da Fonseca (born 30 October 1992) is a Santomean-born Portuguese judoka who competes for both Portugal and Sporting Clube de Portugal. He competed at the 2016 Summer Olympics in the men's 100 kg event, in which he was eliminated in the second round by Lukáš Krpálek. He won the gold medal at the 2019 World Judo Championships in Tokyo and in the 2021 World Judo Championships in Budapest. He won the bronze medal at the 2020 Summer Olympics in Tokyo.

== Personal life ==
In 2015, after he injured his left knee ligament, doctors found a malignant tumor on his left leg. Later on, he won the battle against cancer.

Upon winning the medals in 2021, Fonseca questioned in his ironic speech to Adidas and Puma: "This medal I will dedicate to Adidas and Puma because they said I had no capacity to be a Puma representative. I dedicate this medal to Puma and Adidas leaders. I've already shown that I'm two-time world champion, third at the Olympic Games. Which status do I need to be sponsored by Adidas and Puma?"

In 2022, he was a candidate for PSP, the national civil police force of Portugal, but failed the entrance examinations at the Escola Prática de Polícia (police school).
