= Michael Korrel =

Dutch judoka (born 1994)

Personal information
- Nationality: Dutch
- Born: 27 February 1994 (age 32) Vianen
- Occupation: Judoka
- Website: michaelkorrel.nl/en/

Sport
- Country: Netherlands
- Sport: Judo
- Weight class: ‍–‍100 kg

Achievements and titles
- Olympic Games: 7th (2024)
- World Champ.: (bronze) (2019, 2022)
- European Champ.: (gold) (2022)
Medal record
Men's judo
Representing the Netherlands
World Championships
Bronze medal – third place	2019 Tokyo	‍–‍100 kg
Bronze medal – third place	2022 Tashkent	‍–‍100 kg
Bronze medal – third place	2023 Doha	Mixed team
European Games
Bronze medal – third place	2023 Kraków	Mixed team
European Championships
Gold medal – first place	2022 Sofia	‍–‍100 kg
Bronze medal – third place	2016 Kazan	‍–‍100 kg
Bronze medal – third place	2024 Zagreb	‍–‍100 kg
World Masters
Gold medal – first place	2019 Qingdao	‍–‍100 kg
Silver medal – second place	2017 Saint Petersburg	‍–‍100 kg
IJF Grand Slam
Gold medal – first place	2017 Baku	‍–‍100 kg
Gold medal – first place	2018 Paris	‍–‍100 kg
Gold medal – first place	2019 Baku	‍–‍100 kg
Gold medal – first place	2021 Tel Aviv	‍–‍100 kg
Gold medal – first place	2023 Paris	‍–‍100 kg
Gold medal – first place	2024 Abu Dhabi	‍–‍100 kg
Silver medal – second place	2017 Tokyo	‍–‍100 kg
Silver medal – second place	2022 Tel Aviv	‍–‍100 kg
Silver medal – second place	2023 Tel Aviv	‍–‍100 kg
Bronze medal – third place	2015 Paris	‍–‍100 kg
Bronze medal – third place	2020 Paris	‍–‍100 kg
Bronze medal – third place	2021 Abu Dhabi	‍–‍100 kg
Bronze medal – third place	2022 Ulaanbaatar	‍–‍100 kg
Bronze medal – third place	2023 Tokyo	‍–‍100 kg
Bronze medal – third place	2024 Baku	‍–‍100 kg
Bronze medal – third place	2026 Astana	‍–‍100 kg
IJF Grand Prix
Gold medal – first place	2016 Budapest	‍–‍100 kg
Gold medal – first place	2022 Zagreb	‍–‍100 kg
Silver medal – second place	2015 Zagreb	‍–‍100 kg
Silver medal – second place	2016 Zagreb	‍–‍100 kg
Bronze medal – third place	2017 Düsseldorf	‍–‍100 kg
Bronze medal – third place	2017 The Hague	‍–‍100 kg
Bronze medal – third place	2018 The Hague	‍–‍100 kg
Bronze medal – third place	2019 Tbilisi	‍–‍100 kg
European U23 Championships
Silver medal – second place	2014 Wrocław	‍–‍90 kg
European Junior Championships
Silver medal – second place	2012 Poreč	‍–‍90 kg
Silver medal – second place	2013 Sarajevo	‍–‍90 kg

Profile at external databases
- IJF: 9286
- JudoInside.com: 49143
- Updated on 10 May 2026

Michael Korrel (born 27 February 1994) is a Dutch judoka.

Korrel won a bronze medal at the 2019 World Judo Championships in the ‍–‍100 kg category.

Korrel won the silver medal in the half-heavyweight (−100 kg) event at the 2022 Judo Grand Slam Tel Aviv held in Tel Aviv, Israel.
