= Germany at the 2020 Summer Olympics =

- IOC code: GER
- NOC: German Olympic Sports Confederation
- Website: www.dosb.de (in German, English, and French)

in Tokyo, Japan July 23, 2021 – August 8, 2021
- Competitors: 425 in 32 sports
- Flag bearers (opening): Laura Ludwig; Patrick Hausding
- Flag bearer (closing): Ronald Rauhe
- Medals Ranked 9th: Gold 10 Silver 11 Bronze 16 Total 37

Summer Olympics appearances (overview)
- 1896; 1900; 1904; 1908; 1912; 1920–1924; 1928; 1932; 1936; 1948; 1952; 1956–1988; 1992; 1996; 2000; 2004; 2008; 2012; 2016; 2020; 2024; 2028

Other related appearances
- 1906 Intercalated Games –––– Saar (1952); United Team of Germany (1956–1964); East Germany (1968–1988); West Germany (1968–1988)

Germany competed at the 2020 Summer Olympics in Tokyo. Originally scheduled to take place from 24 July to 9 August 2020, the Games were postponed to 23 July to 8 August 2021, because of the COVID-19 pandemic. It was the nation's eighth consecutive appearance at the Summer Olympic Games after its reunification in 1990.

Germany competed in all sports except artistic swimming, baseball, rugby sevens, softball and water polo.

Germany's medal total of 37 medals is the second lowest number won by Germany at a Summer Olympics post-reunification, only better than the performance in Paris 2024, where the country ended with 33 medal in total.

== Medalists ==
Medal	Name	Sport	Event	Date
Gold	Ricarda Funk	Canoeing	Women's slalom K-1	27 July
Gold	Dorothee Schneider; Isabell Werth; Jessica von Bredow-Werndl	Equestrian	Team dressage	27 July
Gold	Jessica von Bredow-Werndl	Equestrian	Individual dressage	28 July
Gold	Alexander Zverev	Tennis	Men's singles	1 August
Gold	Aline Rotter-Focken	Wrestling	Women's freestyle 76 kg	2 August
Gold	Julia Krajewski	Equestrian	Individual eventing	2 August
Gold	Malaika Mihambo	Athletics	Women's long jump	3 August
Gold	Franziska Brauße; Lisa Brennauer; Lisa Klein; Mieke Kröger	Cycling	Women's team pursuit	3 August
Gold	Florian Wellbrock	Swimming	Men's 10 kilometre open water	5 August
Gold	Max Lemke; Tom Liebscher; Ronald Rauhe; Max Rendschmidt	Canoeing	Men's K-4 500 metres	7 August
Silver	Eduard Trippel	Judo	Men's 90 kg	28 July
Silver	Isabell Werth	Equestrian	Individual dressage	28 July
Silver	Jason Osborne; Jonathan Rommelmann	Rowing	Men's lightweight double sculls	29 July
Silver	Laurits Follert; Malte Jakschik; Torben Johannesen; Hannes Ocik; Olaf Roggensack; Martin Sauer; Richard Schmidt; Jakob Schneider; Johannes Weißenfeld	Rowing	Men's eight	30 July
Silver	Lea Sophie Friedrich; Emma Hinze	Cycling	Women's team sprint	2 August
Silver	Kristin Pudenz	Athletics	Women's discus throw	2 August
Silver	Susann Beucke; Tina Lutz	Sailing	Women's 49er FX	3 August
Silver	Lukas Dauser	Gymnastics	Men's parallel bars	3 August
Silver	Max Hoff; Jacob Schopf	Canoeing	Men's K-2 1000 metres	5 August
Silver	Jonathan Hilbert	Athletics	Men's 50 kilometres walk	6 August
Silver	Timo Boll; Patrick Franziska; Dimitrij Ovtcharov	Table tennis	Men's team	6 August
Bronze	Lena Hentschel; Tina Punzel	Diving	Women's synchronized 3 metre springboard	25 July
Bronze	Michelle Kroppen; Charline Schwarz; Lisa Unruh	Archery	Women's team	25 July
Bronze	Sideris Tasiadis	Canoeing	Men's slalom C-1	26 July
Bronze	Sarah Köhler	Swimming	Women's 1500 metre freestyle	28 July
Bronze	Patrick Hausding; Lars Rüdiger	Diving	Men's synchronized 3 metre springboard	28 July
Bronze	Andrea Herzog	Canoeing	Women's slalom C-1	29 July
Bronze	Anna-Maria Wagner	Judo	Women's 78 kg	29 July
Bronze	Hannes Aigner	Canoeing	Men's slalom K-1	30 July
Bronze	Dimitrij Ovtcharov	Table tennis	Men's singles	30 July
Bronze	Germany judo team: Sebastian Seidl; Igor Wandtke; Dominic Ressel; Eduard Trippel; Karl-Richard Frey; Johannes Frey; Theresa Stoll; Martyna Trajdos; Giovanna Scoccimarro; Anna-Maria Wagner; Jasmin Grabowski	Judo	Mixed team	31 July
Bronze	Florian Wellbrock	Swimming	Men's 1500 metre freestyle	1 August
Bronze	Sebastian Brendel; Tim Hecker	Canoeing	Men's C-2 1000 metres	3 August
Bronze	Erik Heil; Thomas Plößel	Sailing	Men's 49er	3 August
Bronze	Paul Kohlhoff; Alica Stuhlemmer	Sailing	Mixed nacra 17	3 August
Bronze	Frank Stäbler	Wrestling	Men's Greco-Roman 67 kg	4 August
Bronze	Denis Kudla	Wrestling	Men's Greco-Roman 87 kg	4 August

Medals by sport
Sport	1st place, gold medalist(s)	2nd place, silver medalist(s)	3rd place, bronze medalist(s)	Total
Equestrian	3	1	0	4
Canoeing	2	1	4	7
Athletics	1	2	0	3
Cycling	1	1	0	2
Swimming	1	0	2	3
Wrestling	1	0	2	3
Tennis	1	0	0	1
Rowing	0	2	0	2
Judo	0	1	2	3
Sailing	0	1	2	3
Table tennis	0	1	1	2
Gymnastics	0	1	0	1
Diving	0	0	2	2
Archery	0	0	1	1
Total	10	11	16	37

Medals by gender
Gender	1st place, gold medalist(s)	2nd place, silver medalist(s)	3rd place, bronze medalist(s)	Total
Female	7	4	5	16
Male	3	7	9	19
Mixed	0	0	2	2
Total	10	11	16	37

Multiple medalists
Name	Sport	1st place, gold medalist(s)	2nd place, silver medalist(s)	3rd place, bronze medalist(s)	Total
Jessica von Bredow-Werndl	Equestrian	2	0	0	2
Isabell Werth	Equestrian	1	1	0	2
Florian Wellbrock	Swimming	1	0	1	2
Eduard Trippel	Judo	0	1	1	2
Dimitrij Ovtcharov	Table tennis	0	1	1	2
Anna-Maria Wagner	Judo	0	0	2	2

== Competitors ==
The following is the list of number of competitors in the Games. Note that reserves in field hockey, football, and handball are not counted:

Sport	Men	Women	Total
Archery	1	3	4
Athletics	43	47	90
Badminton	3	2	5
Basketball	12	0	12
Boxing	2	1	3
Canoeing	11	10	21
Cycling	14	14	28
Diving	5	4	9
Equestrian	6	6	12
Fencing	8	1	9
Field hockey	19	19	38
Football	19	0	19
Golf	2	2	4
Gymnastics	4	4	8
Handball	15	0	15
Judo	7	6	13
Karate	3	1	4
Modern pentathlon	2	2	4
Rowing	20	7	27
Sailing	4	6	10
Shooting	3	5	8
Skateboarding	1	1	2
Sport climbing	2	0	2
Surfing	1	0	1
Swimming	18	13	31
Table tennis	4	4	8
Taekwondo	1	0	1
Tennis	6	3	9
Triathlon	2	2	4
Volleyball	2	4	6
Weightlifting	2	2	4
Wrestling	5	2	7
Total	254	171	425

== Archery ==
Three German archers qualified for the women's events by reaching the quarterfinal stage of the women's team recurve at the 2019 World Archery Championships in 's-Hertogenbosch, Netherlands. Another German archer finished among the top four vying for qualification of the men's individual recurve to book an outright Olympic berth available at the 2021 European Championships in Antalya, Turkey.

Athlete	Event	Ranking round		Round of 64	Round of 32	Round of 16	Quarterfinals	Semifinals	Final / BM	
Athlete	Event	Score	Seed	Opposition Score	Opposition Score	Opposition Score	Opposition Score	Opposition Score	Opposition Score	Rank
Florian Unruh	Men's individual	654	33	Dwi Pangestu (INA); W 6–2	Kim J-d (KOR); W 7–3	Duenas (CAN); W 6–2	Nespoli (ITA); L 4–6	Did not advance		
Michelle Kroppen	Women's individual	655	11	Sichenikova (UKR); W 6–0	Osipova (ROC); L 4–6	Did not advance				
Charline Schwarz	Women's individual	607	60	Brown (USA); L 2–6	Did not advance					
Lisa Unruh	Women's individual	647	26	Marusava (BLR); L 4–6	Did not advance					
Michelle Kroppen; Charline Schwarz; Lisa Unruh	Women's team	1909	10	—N/a		Chinese Taipei; W 6–2	Mexico; W 6–2	ROC; L 1–5	Belarus; W 5–1	3rd place, bronze medalist(s)
Florian Unruh; Michelle Kroppen	Mixed team	1309	13 Q	—N/a		Mexico; L 2–6	Did not advance			

== Athletics ==
German athletes further achieved the entry standards, either by qualifying time or by world ranking, in the following track and field events (up to a maximum of 3 athletes in each event):

Key

- Note–Ranks given for track events are within the athlete's heat only
- Q = Qualified for the next round
- q = Qualified for the next round as a fastest loser or, in field events, by position without achieving the qualifying target
- NR = National record
- N/A = Round not applicable for the event
- Bye = Athlete not required to compete in round

Track & road events
Men

Athlete	Event	Heat		Semifinal		Final	
Athlete	Event	Time	Rank	Time	Rank	Time	Rank
Steven Müller	200 m	21.08	6	Did not advance			
Marvin Schlegel	400 m	46.39	6	Did not advance			
Amos Bartelsmeyer	1500 m	3:38.36	11	Did not advance			
Robert Farken	1500 m	3:36.61	5 Q	3:35.21	8	Did not advance	
Mohamed Mohumed	5000 m	13:50.46	16	—N/a		Did not advance	
Gregor Traber	110 m hurdles	13.65	5	Did not advance			
Joshua Abuaku	400 m hurdles	49.50 SB	5 q	49.93	8	Did not advance	
Luke Campbell	400 m hurdles	49.19 SB	4 Q	48.62 PB	5	Did not advance	
Constantin Preis	400 m hurdles	49.73	4 Q	49.10	4	Did not advance	
Karl Bebendorf	3000 m steeplechase	8:33.27	11	—N/a		Did not advance	
Deniz Almas; Lucas Ansah-Peprah; Joshua Hartmann; Julian Reus	4 × 100 m relay	38.06 SB	4 q	—N/a		38.12	6
Jean Paul Bredau; Luke Campbell; Manuel Sanders; Marvin Schlegel	4 × 400 m relay	3:03.62	8	—N/a		Did not advance	
Amanal Petros	Marathon	—N/a				2:16:33 SB	30
Hendrik Pfeiffer	Marathon	—N/a				2:20:43 SB	50
Richard Ringer	Marathon	—N/a				2:16:08	26
Nils Brembach	20 km walk	—N/a				1:26:45	28
Leo Köpp	20 km walk	—N/a				1:24:46	22
Christopher Linke	20 km walk	—N/a				1:21:50	5
Carl Dohmann	50 km walk	—N/a				4:07:18	33
Jonathan Hilbert	50 km walk	—N/a				3:50:44	2nd place, silver medalist(s)
Nathaniel Seiler	50 km walk	—N/a				4:15:37	42

Women

Athlete	Event	Heat		Quarterfinal		Semifinal		Final	
Athlete	Event	Time	Rank	Time	Rank	Time	Rank	Time	Rank
Alexandra Burghardt	100 m	Bye		11.08	1 Q	11.07	4	Did not advance	
Lisa Mayer	100 m	Bye		DNS		Did not advance			
Tatjana Pinto	100 m	Bye		11.16	3 Q	11.35	7	Did not advance	
Lisa-Marie Kwayie	200 m	23.14	4 q	—N/a		23.42	8	Did not advance	
Jessica-Bianca Wessolly	200 m	23.41	5	—N/a		Did not advance			
Corinna Schwab	400 m	52.29	4	—N/a		Did not advance			
Christina Hering	800 m	2:02.23	5	—N/a		Did not advance			
Katharina Trost	800 m	2:00.99	5 q	—N/a		2:02.14	8	Did not advance	
Caterina Granz	1500 m	4:06.22 SB	9 q	—N/a		4:10.93	12	Did not advance	
Hanna Klein	1500 m	4:14.83	15	—N/a		Did not advance			
Konstanze Klosterhalfen	10000 m	—N/a						31:01.97	8
Ricarda Lobe	100 m hurdles	13.43	8	—N/a		Did not advance			
Carolina Krafzik	400 m hurdles	54.72 PB	2 Q	—N/a		54.96	4	Did not advance	
Elena Burkard	3000 m steeplechase	9:30.64	6	—N/a				Did not advance	
Gesa Felicitas Krause	3000 m steeplechase	9:19.62	2 Q	—N/a				9:14.00	5
Lea Meyer	3000 m steeplechase	9:33.00	7	—N/a				Did not advance	
Alexandra Burghardt; Rebekka Haase; Gina Lückenkemper; Tatjana Pinto	4 × 100 m relay	42.00	1 Q	—N/a				42.12	5
Carolina Krafzik; Laura Müller; Corinna Schwab; Ruth Sophia Spelmeyer-Preuß	4 × 400 m relay	3:24.77	4	—N/a				Did not advance	
Melat Yisak Kejeta	Marathon	—N/a						2:29:16 SB	6
Deborah Schöneborn	Marathon	—N/a						2:33:08 SB	18
Katharina Steinruck	Marathon	—N/a						2:35:00	31
Saskia Feige	20 km walk	—N/a						DNF	

Mixed

Athlete	Event	Heat		Final	
Athlete	Event	Time	Rank	Time	Rank
Marvin Schlegel; Corinna Schwab; Nadine Gonska; Manuel Sanders; Ruth Sophia Spelmeyer-Preuß*	4 × 400 m relay	3:12.94 NR	5 q	DNF	

Field events
Men

Athlete	Event	Qualification		Final	
Athlete	Event	Distance	Position	Distance	Position
Fabian Heinle	Long jump	7.96 SB	10 q	7.62	12
Max Heß	Triple jump	16.69	17	Did not advance	
Mateusz Przybylko	High jump	2.21	23	Did not advance	
Bo Kanda Lita Baehre	Pole vault	5.75	1 q	5.70	11
Torben Blech	Pole vault	5.30	25	Did not advance	
Oleg Zernikel	Pole vault	5.65	12 q	5.70	9
Daniel Jasinski	Discus throw	63.29	9 q	62.44	10
Clemens Prüfer	Discus throw	63.18	11 q	61.75	11
David Wrobel	Discus throw	60.38	22	Did not advance	
Bernhard Seifert	Javelin throw	68.30	31	Did not advance	
Johannes Vetter	Javelin throw	85.64	2 Q	82.52	9
Julian Weber	Javelin throw	84.41	6 Q	85.30 SB	4
Tristan Schwandke	Hammer throw	73.77	21	Did not advance	

Women

Athlete	Event	Qualification		Final	
Athlete	Event	Distance	Position	Distance	Position
Maryse Luzolo	Long jump	6.54	15	Did not advance	
Malaika Mihambo	Long jump	6.98 SB	2 Q	7.00 SB	1st place, gold medalist(s)
Neele Eckhardt	Triple jump	14.20	14	Did not advance	
Kristin Gierisch	Triple jump	13.02	30	Did not advance	
Marie-Laurence Jungfleisch	High jump	1.95 SB	4 Q	1.93	10
Imke Onnen	High jump	1.86	25	Did not advance	
Sara Gambetta	Shot put	18.57	12 q	18.88 PB	8
Katharina Maisch	Shot put	17.89	15	Did not advance	
Christina Schwanitz	Shot put	18.08	14	Did not advance	
Kristin Pudenz	Discus throw	63.73	4 q	66.86 PB	2nd place, silver medalist(s)
Marike Steinacker	Discus throw	63.22	6 q	62.02	8
Claudine Vita	Discus throw	62.46	10 q	61.80	9
Christin Hussong	Javelin throw	61.68	11 q	59.94	9
Samantha Borutta	Hammer throw	67.38	24	Did not advance	

Combined events – Men's decathlon

Athlete	Event	100 m	LJ	SP	HJ	400 m	110H	DT	PV	JT	1500 m	Final	Rank
Niklas Kaul	Result	11.22 SB	7.36 PB	14.55 SB	2.11 PB	DNF	DNS	—	—	—	—	DNF	
Niklas Kaul	Points	812	900	762	906	0	0	—	—	—	—	DNF	
Kai Kazmirek	Result	11.09	7.48 SB	14.46 SB	2.02	48.17	14.73	42.70	4.80	63.76 SB	4:48.30	8126	14
Kai Kazmirek	Points	841	930	757	822	901	882	720	849	795	629	8126	14

Combined event – Women's heptathlon

Athlete	Event	100H	HJ	SP	200 m	LJ	JT	800 m	Total	Rank
Vanessa Grimm	Result	13.88	1.77 =PB	14.52	25.03	5.94	44.75	2:16.27	6114	19
Vanessa Grimm	Points	995	941	829	884	831	759	875	6114	19
Carolin Schäfer	Result	13.29 SB	1.80 SB	13.99 SB	24.33 SB	5.78 SB	54.10 PB	2:14.92 SB	6419 SB	7
Carolin Schäfer	Points	1081	978	793	949	783	940	895	6419 SB	7

== Badminton ==
Germany entered five badminton players (three men and two women) into the Olympic tournament based on the BWF Race to Tokyo Rankings; one entry each in the men's and women's singles and a pair in the men's and mixed doubles.

Athlete	Event	Group stage				Elimination	Quarterfinal	Semifinal	Final / BM	
Athlete	Event	Opposition Score	Opposition Score	Opposition Score	Rank	Opposition Score	Opposition Score	Opposition Score	Opposition Score	Rank
Kai Schäfer	Men's singles	Wangcharoen (THA); L (13–21, 15–21)	Penty (GBR); L (18–21, 11–21)	—N/a	3	Did not advance				
Yvonne Li	Women's singles	Okuhara (JPN); L (17–21, 4–21)	Kosetskaya (ROC); L (20–22, 15–21)	—N/a	3	Did not advance				
Mark Lamsfuß; Marvin Seidel	Men's doubles	Kamura / Sonoda (JPN); L (13–21, 8–21)	Li / Liu (CHN); L (14–21, 13–21)	Chew / Chew (USA); W (21–10, 21–16)	3	—N/a	Did not advance			
Mark Lamsfuß; Isabel Herttrich	Mixed doubles	Wang / Huang (CHN); L (22–24, 17–21)	Chan / Goh (MAS); W (21–12, 21–15)	Tang / Tse (HKG); L (20–22, 22–20, 16–21)	3	—N/a	Did not advance			

== Basketball ==
Summary

Key:

- OT – Overtime.

Team	Event	Group stage				Quarterfinal	Semi-final	Final / BM	
Team	Event	Opposition Score	Opposition Score	Opposition Score	Rank	Opposition Score	Opposition Score	Opposition Score	Rank
Germany men's	Men's tournament	Italy; L 82–92	Nigeria; W 99–92	Australia; L 76–89	3 Q	Slovenia; L 70–94	Did not advance		

=== Men's tournament ===
The German men's basketball team qualified for the Olympics by winning the Olympic Qualifying Tournament in Split, Croatia.

Team roster

The roster was announced on 5 July 2021.

Germany national basketball team – 2020 Summer Olympics roster
Players
Coaches

Pos.	No.	Name	Age – Date of birth	Height	Club	Ctr.
PG	0	Isaac Bonga	21 – 8 November 1999	2.03 m (6 ft 8 in)	Washington Wizards	(United States)
SG	1	Joshiko Saibou	31 – 7 March 1990	1.88 m (6 ft 2 in)	Champagne Châlons-Reims	(France)
PG	4	Maodo Lô	28 – 31 December 1992	1.92 m (6 ft 4 in)	Alba Berlin	(Germany)
SF	5	Niels Giffey	30 – 8 June 1991	2.00 m (6 ft 7 in)	Žalgiris	(Lithuania)
F	6	Jan Niklas Wimberg	25 – 11 February 1996	2.06 m (6 ft 9 in)	Niners Chemnitz	(Germany)
C	7	Johannes Voigtmann	28 – 30 September 1992	2.09 m (6 ft 10 in)	CSKA Moscow	(Russia)
F	12	Robin Benzing	32 – 25 January 1989	2.10 m (6 ft 11 in)	Basket Zaragoza	(Spain)
PF	13	Moritz Wagner	24 – 26 April 1997	2.11 m (6 ft 11 in)	Orlando Magic	(United States)
SF	19	Lukas Wank	24 – 19 January 1997	1.99 m (6 ft 6 in)	Löwen Braunschweig	(Germany)
PF	22	Danilo Barthel	29 – 24 October 1991	2.07 m (6 ft 9 in)	Fenerbahçe	(Turkey)
PF	32	Johannes Thiemann	27 – 9 February 1994	2.05 m (6 ft 9 in)	Alba Berlin	(Germany)
SG	42	Andreas Obst	25 – 13 July 1996	1.91 m (6 ft 3 in)	ratiopharm Ulm	(Germany)

Head coach

- (Germany) Henrik Rödl

Assistant coach(es)

- (Australia) Alan Ibrahimagic
- (Canada) Roy Rana

Legend

- Club – describes last
  club before the tournament
- Age – describes age
  on 25 July 2021

Group play

Pos	Team	Pld	W	L	PF	PA	PD	Pts	Qualification
1	Australia	3	3	0	259	226	+33	6	Quarterfinals
2	Italy	3	2	1	255	239	+16	5	Quarterfinals
3	Germany	3	1	2	257	273	−16	4	Quarterfinals
4	Nigeria	3	0	3	230	263	−33	3	

Source: TOCOG and FIBA
Rules for classification: 1) classification points; 2) head-to-head results; 3) head-to-head game points difference; 4) head-to-head number of game points scored.

25 July 2021
13:40
v

Boxscore

Germany	82–92	Italy
Scoring by quarter: 32–22, 14–21, 26–25, 10–24
Pts: Lô 24; Rebs: Voigtmann 6 Asts: three players 4		Pts: Fontecchio 20; Rebs: Melli 9 Asts: Mannion 7

Saitama Super Arena, Saitama
Referees: Antonio Conde (ESP), Ahmed Al-Shuwaili (IRQ), Yevgeniy Mikheyev (KAZ)

28 July 2021
10:00
v

Boxscore

Nigeria	92–99	Germany
Scoring by quarter: 21–24, 29–26, 24–24, 18–25
Pts: Nwora 33; Rebs: Nwora 7 Asts: Emegano 6		Pts: Voigtmann 19; Rebs: Thiemann 10; Asts: Lô 9

Saitama Super Arena, Saitama
Referees: Omar Bermúdez (MEX), Mārtiņš Kozlovskis (LAT), Rabah Noujaim (LIB)

31 July 2021
17:20
v

Boxscore

Australia	89–76	Germany
Scoring by quarter: 18–22, 26–18, 22–19, 23–17
Pts: Mills 24; Rebs: Ingles 5 Asts: Mills 6		Pts: Obst 17; Rebs: Voigtmann 13; Asts: Lô 5

Saitama Super Arena, Saitama
Referees: Juan Fernández (ARG), Steven Anderson (USA), Omar Bermúdez (MEX)

Quarterfinal

3 August 2021
10:00
v

Boxscore

Slovenia	94–70	Germany
Scoring by quarter: 25–14, 19–23, 22–17, 28–16
Pts: Dragić 27; Rebs: Tobey 11; Asts: Dončić 11		Pts: Lô 11; Rebs: Bonga 7 Asts: Bonga 3

Saitama Super Arena, Saitama
Referees: Ademir Zurapović (BIH), Matthew Kallio (CAN), Omar Bermúdez (MEX)

== Boxing ==
Germany entered three boxers (two men and one woman) into the Olympic tournament. Chechnya-born Hamsat Shadalov (men's featherweight), Ammar Abduljabbar (men's heavyweight), and Nadine Apetz (women's welterweight) secured the spots on the German squad in their respective weight divisions, either by winning the round of 16 match, advancing to the semifinal match, or scoring a box-off triumph, at the 2020 European Qualification Tournament in London and Paris.

Athlete	Event	Round of 32	Round of 16	Quarterfinals	Semifinals	Final	
Athlete	Event	Opposition Result	Opposition Result	Opposition Result	Opposition Result	Opposition Result	Rank
Hamsat Shadalov	Men's featherweight	Cuello (ARG); L 2–3	Did not advance				
Ammar Abduljabbar	Men's heavyweight	Bye	Lúcar (PER); W 5–0	Gadzhimagomedov (ROC); L 0–5	Did not advance		
Nadine Apetz	Women's welterweight	Bye	Borgohain (IND); L 2–3	Did not advance			

== Canoeing ==
=== Slalom ===
German canoeists qualified one boat for each of the following classes through the 2019 ICF Canoe Slalom World Championships in La Seu d'Urgell, Spain and the 2021 European Canoe Slalom Championships in Ivrea, Italy. The slalom canoeists, highlighted by London 2012 medalists and two-time Olympians Hannes Aigner (men's K-1) and Sideris Tasiadis (men's C-1), were named as part of the nations' second batch of nominated athletes on 1 June 2021.

Athlete	Event	Preliminary						Semifinal		Final	
Athlete	Event	Run 1	Rank	Run 2	Rank	Best	Rank	Time	Rank	Time	Rank
Sideris Tasiadis	Men's C-1	100.69	6	101.23	3	100.69	6 Q	105.35	6 Q	103.70	3rd place, bronze medalist(s)
Hannes Aigner	Men's K-1	96.51	11	90.14	1	90.14	1 Q	97.97	7 Q	97.11	3rd place, bronze medalist(s)
Andrea Herzog	Women's C-1	113.69	5	106.34	2	106.34	2 Q	114.61	4 Q	111.13	3rd place, bronze medalist(s)
Ricarda Funk	Women's K-1	101.90	1	101.56	2	101.56	2 Q	107.96	3 Q	105.50	1st place, gold medalist(s)

=== Sprint ===
German canoeists qualified a total of six boats in each of the following distances for the Games through the 2019 ICF Canoe Sprint World Championships in Szeged, Hungary.

The sprint canoeists were officially named as part of the nation's third batch of nominated athletes on 15 June 2021, with the reigning champion Sebastian Brendel adding more golds to his canoe sprint career in his third Olympics and four-time medalist Ronald Rauhe leading the squad to his remarkable sixth Games.

Men

Athlete	Event	Heats		Quarterfinals		Semifinals		Final	
Athlete	Event	Time	Rank	Time	Rank	Time	Rank	Time	Rank
Sebastian Brendel	C-1 1000 m	4:02.351	3 QF	4:07.036	1 SF	4:11.413	7 FB	4:03.723	10
Conrad Scheibner	C-1 1000 m	4:04.920	2 SF	Bye		4:08.503	3 FA	4:13.725	6
Sebastian Brendel; Tim Hecker	C-2 1000 m	3:42.773	1 SF	Bye		3:26.812 OB	1 FA	3:25.615	3rd place, bronze medalist(s)
Jacob Schopf	K-1 1000 m	3:39.504	1 SF	Bye		3:25.568	3 FA	3:22.554	4
Max Hoff; Jacob Schopf	K-2 1000 m	3:09.830	2 SF	Bye		3:17.554	1 FA	3:15.584	2nd place, silver medalist(s)
Max Lemke; Tom Liebscher; Ronald Rauhe; Max Rendschmidt	K-4 500 m	1:21.890	1 SF	Bye		1:23.049	1 FA	1:22.219	1st place, gold medalist(s)

Women

Athlete	Event	Heats		Quarterfinals		Semifinals		Final	
Athlete	Event	Time	Rank	Time	Rank	Time	Rank	Time	Rank
Lisa Jahn	C-1 200 m	47.439	4 QF	47.049	2 SF	49.136	7 FB	48.798	13
Sophie Koch	C-1 200 m	48.601	5 QF	48.891	4	Did not advance			
Lisa Jahn; Sophie Koch	C-2 500 m	2:01.184	2 SF	Bye		2:04.749	3 FA	1:59.943	4
Jule Hake	K-1 500 m	1:48.758	3 SF	Bye		1:54.341	5 FC	1:55.638	18
Sabrina Hering-Pradler	K-1 500 m	1:49.932	2 SF	Bye		1:54.140	4 FB	1:53.919	10
Caroline Arft; Sarah Brüßler	K-2 500 m	1:48.058	3 QF	1:48.450	2 SF	1:39.421	6 FB	1:39.953	11
Tina Dietze; Sabrina Hering-Pradler	K-2 500 m	1:44.894	2 SF	Bye		1:38.954	4 FA	1:42.406	8
Tina Dietze; Melanie Gebhardt; Jule Hake; Sabrina Hering-Pradler	K-4 500 m	1:34.681	2 SF	Bye		1:36.737	3 FA	1:37.243	5

Qualification Legend: FA = Qualify to final (medal); FB = Qualify to final B (non-medal)

== Cycling ==
=== Road ===
Germany entered a squad of eight riders (four per gender) to compete in their respective Olympic road races, by virtue of their top 50 national finish (for men) and top 22 (for women) in the UCI World Ranking.

Men

Athlete	Event	Time	Rank
Nikias Arndt	Road race	6:16:53	54
Nikias Arndt	Time trial	58:49.39	19
Emanuel Buchmann	Road race	6:11:46	29
Simon Geschke	Road race	Did not start	
Maximilian Schachmann	Road race	6:06:47	10
Maximilian Schachmann	Time trial	58:33.82	15

Women

Athlete	Event	Time	Rank
Lisa Brennauer	Road race	3:54:31	6
Lisa Brennauer	Time trial	32:10.71	6
Lisa Klein	Time trial	33:01.97	13
Liane Lippert	Road race	3:55:17	23
Hannah Ludwig	Road race	4:01:08	41
Trixi Worrack	Road race	Did not finish	

=== Track ===
Following the completion of the 2020 UCI Track Cycling World Championships, German riders accumulated spots for both men and women in team sprint, team pursuit, and madison, as well as the men's omnium, based on their country's results in the final UCI Olympic rankings. As a result of their place in the men's and women's team sprint, Germany won its right to enter two riders in both men's and women's sprint and men's and women's keirin.

Deutscher Olympischer Sportbund (DOSB) announced the full track cycling squad, as part of the third batch of nominated German athletes, on 15 June 2021, with triple medalist Maximilian Levy racing along the sprint track in his fourth consecutive Games.

Sprint

Athlete	Event	Qualification		Round 1	Repechage 1	Round 2	Repechage 2	Round 3	Repechage 3	Quarterfinals	Semifinals	Final	
Athlete	Event	Time Speed (km/h)	Rank	Opposition Time Speed (km/h)	Opposition Time Speed (km/h)	Opposition Time Speed (km/h)	Opposition Time Speed (km/h)	Opposition Time Speed (km/h)	Opposition Time Speed (km/h)	Opposition Time Speed (km/h)	Opposition Time Speed (km/h)	Opposition Time Speed (km/h)	Rank
Stefan Bötticher	Men's sprint	9.593; 75.055	13 Q	Wammes (CAN); L	Richardson (AUS); Helal (FRA); W 10.030; 71.785	Hoogland (NED); L	Wakimoto (JPN); L	Did not advance					
Maximilian Levy	Men's sprint	9.646; 74.642	19 Q	Tjon En Fa (SUR); W 9.922; 72.566	Bye	Rajkowski (POL); W 10.247; 70.264	Bye	Webster (NZL); W 10.355; 69.532	Bye	Carlin (GBR); L, L	Did not advance	5th place final Vigier (FRA); Kenny (GBR); Paul (TTO); W 9.879; 72.882	5
Lea Sophie Friedrich	Women's sprint	10.310 OR; 69.385	1 Q	Marozaitė (LTU); W 11.226; 64.137	Bye	Godby (USA); W 11.085; 64.953	Bye	Voynova (ROC); W 11.117; 64.766	Bye	Starikova (UKR); L, W 10.887, L	Did not advance	5th place final Genest (CAN); Braspennincx (NED); Marchant (GBR); W 10.817; 66.562	5
Emma Hinze	Women's sprint	10.381; 69.357	3 Q	du Preez (RSA); W 10.923; 65.916	Bye	Bao Sj (CHN); W 10.904; 66.031	Bye	Zhong Ts (CHN); W 11.094; 64.900	Bye	Braspennincx (NED); W 10.829, W 10.773	Mitchell (CAN); L, W 10.998, L	Lee W-s (HKG); L, L	4

Team sprint

Athlete	Event	Qualification		Semifinals		Final	
Athlete	Event	Time Speed (km/h)	Rank	Opposition Time Speed (km/h)	Rank	Opposition Time Speed (km/h)	Rank
Timo Bichler; Stefan Bötticher; Maximilian Levy	Men's team sprint	43.140; 62.587	7	Great Britain; L 42.733; 63.183	5	ROC; W REL	5
Lea Sophie Friedrich; Emma Hinze	Women's team sprint	32.102; 56.071	1	Ukraine; W 31.905; 56.417	2 FA	China; L 31.980; 56.285	2nd place, silver medalist(s)

Qualification legend: FA=Gold medal final; FB=Bronze medal final

Pursuit

Athlete	Event	Qualification		Semifinals		Final	
Athlete	Event	Time	Rank	Opponent Results	Rank	Opponent Results	Rank
Felix Groß; Theo Reinhardt (*); Leon Rohde; Domenic Weinstein; Roger Kluge	Men's team pursuit	3:50.830	7	Canada; L 3:48.861	6	Canada; L 3:50.023	6
Franziska Brauße; Lisa Brennauer; Lisa Klein; Mieke Kröger	Women's team pursuit	4:07.307 WR	1	Italy; W 4:06.159 WR	1	Great Britain; W 4:04.242 WR	1st place, gold medalist(s)

Keirin

Athlete	Event	Round 1	Repechage	Quarterfinals	Semifinals	Final
Athlete	Event	Rank	Rank	Rank	Rank	Rank
Stefan Bötticher	Men's keirin	3 R	2 QF	5	Did not advance	
Maximilian Levy	Men's keirin	2 QF	Bye	4 SF	2 FA	6
Lea Sophie Friedrich	Women's keirin	1 QF	Bye	6	Did not advance	
Emma Hinze	Women's keirin	5 R	2 QF	4 SF	6 FB	7

Omnium

Athlete	Event	Scratch race		Tempo race		Elimination race		Points race		Total points	Rank
Athlete	Event	Rank	Points	Rank	Points	Rank	Points	Rank	Points	Total points	Rank
Roger Kluge	Men's omnium	12	18	11	20	17	8	3	45	91	9

Madison

Athlete	Event	Points	Laps	Rank
Roger Kluge; Theo Reinhardt	Men's madison	–6	–1	9
Franziska Brauße; Lisa Klein	Women's madison	–40	–2	12

=== Mountain biking ===
German mountain bikers qualified for two men's and two women's quota places into the Olympic cross-country race, as a result of the nation's seventh-place finish for each gender, respectively, in the UCI Olympic Ranking List of 16 May 2021.

Athlete	Event	Time	Rank
Maximilian Brandl	Men's cross-country	1:29:49	21
Manuel Fumic	Men's cross-country	1:32:28	28
Elisabeth Brandau	Women's cross-country	LAP (1 lap)	32
Ronja Eibl	Women's cross-country	1:23:49	19

=== BMX ===
Germany received two quota spots for BMX at the Olympics, as a result of the nation's runner-up finish for the women's freestyle and a top-two placement eligible for qualification in the women's race at the 2019 UCI BMX World Championships.

Freestyle

Athlete	Event	Seeding		Final	
Athlete	Event	Points	Rank	Points	Rank
Lara Lessmann	Women's freestyle	69.70	6	79.60	6

== Diving ==
German divers qualified for five individual spots and three synchronized teams at the Games through the 2019 FINA World Championships and the 2021 FINA Diving World Cup. Seven divers (four men and three women), highlighted by Rio 2016 bronze medalist and three-time Olympian Patrick Hausding (men's springboard and men's synchronized springboard), were named as part of the third batch of nominated German athletes on 15 June 2021.

Men

Athlete	Event	Preliminary		Semifinal		Final	
Athlete	Event	Points	Rank	Points	Rank	Points	Rank
Patrick Hausding	3 m springboard	364.05	21	Did not advance			
Martin Wolfram	3 m springboard	444.50	8 Q	423.00	9 Q	426.75	7
Timo Barthel	10 m platform	395.70	13 Q	364.50	17	Did not advance	
Jaden Eikermann	10 m platform	330.75	21	Did not advance			
Patrick Hausding; Lars Rüdiger	3 m synchronized springboard	—N/a				404.73	3rd place, bronze medalist(s)

Women

Athlete	Event	Preliminary		Semifinal		Final	
Athlete	Event	Points	Rank	Points	Rank	Points	Rank
Tina Punzel	3 m springboard	287.00	14 Q	311.05	7 Q	302.95	7
Christina Wassen	10 m platform	297.15	13 Q	237.30	18	Did not advance	
Elena Wassen	10 m platform	323.80	6 Q	303.70	11 Q	291.90	8
Lena Hentschel; Tina Punzel	3 m synchronized springboard	—N/a				284.97	3rd place, bronze medalist(s)
Tina Punzel; Christina Wassen	10 m synchronized platform	—N/a				292.86	5

== Equestrian ==
German equestrians qualified a full squad each in the team dressage, eventing, and jumping competitions by virtue of a top-six finish at the 2018 FEI World Equestrian Games in Tryon, North Carolina, United States.

=== Dressage ===
The German dressage team was named on 27 June 2021. Helen Langehanenberg and Annabelle have been named the travelling alternates.

Athlete	Horse	Event	Grand Prix		Grand Prix Special		Grand Prix Freestyle		Overall	
Athlete	Horse	Event	Score	Rank	Score	Rank	Technical	Artistic	Score	Rank
Jessica von Bredow-Werndl	Dalera	Individual	84.379	1 Q	—N/a		85.893	97.571	91.732	1st place, gold medalist(s)
Dorothee Schneider	Showtime	Individual	78.820	5 Q	—N/a		75.607	83.257	79.432	15
Isabell Werth	Bella Rose	Individual	82.500	2 Q	—N/a		83.429	95.886	89.657	2nd place, silver medalist(s)
Jessica von Bredow-Werndl; Dorothee Schneider; Isabell Werth	See above	Team	7911.5	1 Q	8178.0	1	—N/a		8178.0	1st place, gold medalist(s)

Qualification Legend: Q = Qualified for the final; q = Qualified for the final as a lucky loser

=== Eventing ===
The German eventing team was named on 21 June 2021. Andreas Dibowski and Corrida have been named the travelling alternates.

Athlete	Horse	Event	Dressage		Cross-country			Jumping						Total	
Athlete	Horse	Event	Dressage		Cross-country			Qualifier			Final			Total	
Athlete	Horse	Event	Penalties	Rank	Penalties	Total	Rank	Penalties	Total	Rank	Penalties	Total	Rank	Penalties	Rank
Sandra Auffarth	Viamant du Matz	Individual	34.10	37	22.40	56.50	32	0.00	56.50	30	Did not advance				
Michael Jung	Chipmunk	Individual	21.10	1	11.00	32.10	10	0.00	32.10	7 Q	4.00	36.10	8	36.10	8
Julia Krajewski	Amande de B'Neville	Individual	25.20	4	0.40	25.60	2	0.00	25.60	1 Q	0.40	26.00	1	26.00	1st place, gold medalist(s)
Sandra Auffarth; Michael Jung; Julia Krajewski	See above	Team	80.40	2	33.80	114.20	6	0.00	114.20	4	—N/a			114.20	4

=== Jumping ===
The German jumping team was named on 3 July 2021. Maurice Tebbel and Don Diarado have been named the travelling alternates and will be entered for the team jumping.

Athlete	Horse	Event	Qualification		Final		
Athlete	Horse	Event	Penalties	Rank	Penalties	Time	Rank
Daniel Deusser	Killer Queen	Individual	0	=1 Q	8	85.69	18
Christian Kukuk	Mumbai	Individual	4	=31	Did not advance		
André Thieme	Chakaria	Individual	4	=31	Did not advance		
Daniel Deusser; Maurice Tebbel; André Thieme	Killer Queen; Don Diarado; Chakaria	Team	4	=2 Q	12+RET	160.14	9

== Fencing ==
German fencers qualified a full squad in the men's team sabre by finishing among the top four nations in the FIE Olympic Team Rankings, while the men's foil team claimed the spot, as the highest-ranked nation from Europe outside the world's top four. Leonie Ebert (women's foil) booked an additional place on the German team as one of the two highest-ranked fencers vying for qualification from Europe in the FIE Adjusted Official Rankings.

The fencing teams were officially named as part of the second batch of nominated athletes to the Olympic roster on 1 June 2021, with Peter Joppich (men's foil) and Max Hartung (men's sabre) leading the fencers to their third consecutive Games.

Men

Athlete	Event	Round of 64	Round of 32	Round of 16	Quarterfinal	Semifinal	Final / BM	
Athlete	Event	Opposition Score	Opposition Score	Opposition Score	Opposition Score	Opposition Score	Opposition Score	Rank
Peter Joppich	Foil	Cai (CAN); W 15–12	Massialas (USA); W 15–12	Choupenitch (CZE); L 13–15	Did not advance			
Benjamin Kleibrink	Foil	Bye	Abouelkassem (EGY); L 11–15	Did not advance				
André Sanita	Foil	Cheung SL (HKG); W 15–14	Foconi (ITA); L 8–15	Did not advance				
Peter Joppich; Benjamin Kleibrink; Luis Klein; André Sanita	Team foil	—N/a		Canada; W 45–31	United States; L 36–45	Classification semifinal Hong Kong; W 45–38	Fifth place final Italy; L WO	6
Max Hartung	Sabre	Bye	Decsi (HUN); W 15–8	Pakdaman (IRI); L 9–15	Did not advance			
Matyas Szabo	Sabre	Bye	Gu B-g (KOR); W 15–8	Ibragimov (ROC); L 13–15	Did not advance			
Benedikt Wagner	Sabre	Bye	Ibragimov (ROC); L 13–15	Did not advance				
Max Hartung; Matyas Szabo; Benedikt Wagner	Team sabre	—N/a		Bye	ROC; W 45–28	South Korea; L 42–45	Hungary; L 40–45	4

Women

Athlete	Event	Round of 64	Round of 32	Round of 16	Quarterfinal	Semifinal	Final / BM	
Athlete	Event	Opposition Score	Opposition Score	Opposition Score	Opposition Score	Opposition Score	Opposition Score	Rank
Leonie Ebert	Foil	Bye	Dubrovich (USA); W 15–14	Volpi (ITA); L 13–15	Did not advance			

== Field hockey ==
Summary

Key:

- FT – After full time.
- P – Match decided by penalty-shootout.

Team	Event	Group stage						Quarterfinal	Semifinal	Final / BM	
Team	Event	Opposition Score	Opposition Score	Opposition Score	Opposition Score	Opposition Score	Rank	Opposition Score	Opposition Score	Opposition Score	Rank
Germany men's	Men's tournament	Canada; W 7–1	Belgium; L 1–3	Great Britain; W 4–1	South Africa; L 3–4	Netherlands; W 3–1	2 Q	Argentina; W 3–1	Australia; L 1–3	India; L 4–5	4
Germany women's	Women's tournament	Great Britain; W 2–1	India; W 2–0	Ireland; W 4–2	South Africa; W 4–1	Netherlands; L 1–3	2 Q	Argentina; L 0–3	Did not advance		

=== Men's tournament ===
Germany men's national field hockey team qualified for the Olympics by securing one of the seven tickets available and defeating Austria in a playoff at the Mönchengladbach leg of the 2019 FIH Olympic Qualifiers.

Team roster

The squad was announced on 28 May 2021.

Head coach: Kais al Saadi

No.	Pos.	Player	Date of birth (age)	Caps	Goals	Club
1	GK	Alexander Stadler	16 October 1999 (aged 21)	9	0	(Germany) TSV Mannheim
3	MF	Mats Grambusch	4 November 1992 (aged 28)	152	49	(Germany) Rot-Weiss Köln
4	DF	Lukas Windfeder	11 May 1995 (aged 26)	122	40	(Germany) Uhlenhorst Mülheim
5	DF	Linus Müller	2 December 1999 (aged 21)	17	1	(Germany) Mannheimer HC
6	DF	Martin Häner	27 August 1988 (aged 32)	262	30	(Germany) Berliner HC
8	MF	Paul-Philipp Kaufmann	21 June 1996 (aged 25)	16	3	(Germany) TSV Mannheim
9	FW	Niklas Wellen	14 December 1994 (aged 26)	149	45	(Netherlands) Pinoké
10	DF	Johannes Große	7 January 1997 (aged 24)	66	0	(Germany) Rot-Weiss Köln
11	FW	Constantin Staib	31 August 1995 (aged 25)	79	29	(Germany) Hamburger Polo Club
12	FW	Timm Herzbruch	7 June 1997 (aged 24)	84	41	(Germany) Uhlenhorst Mülheim
13	MF	Tobias Hauke (Captain)	11 September 1987 (aged 33)	324	15	(Germany) Harvestehude
17	FW	Christopher Rühr	19 December 1993 (aged 27)	142	64	(Germany) Rot-Weiss Köln
19	FW	Justus Weigand	20 April 2000 (aged 21)	10	3	(Germany) Mannheimer HC
20	MF	Martin Zwicker	27 February 1987 (aged 34)	247	24	(Germany) Berliner HC
23	FW	Florian Fuchs	10 November 1991 (aged 29)	229	111	(Netherlands) Bloemendaal
24	DF	Benedikt Fürk	20 October 1988 (aged 32)	178	7	(Germany) Uhlenhorst Mülheim
26	DF	Niklas Bosserhoff	15 April 1998 (aged 23)	31	3	(Germany) Uhlenhorst Mülheim
27	MF	Timur Oruz	27 October 1994 (aged 26)	87	13	(Germany) Rot-Weiss Köln

Group play

Pos	Team	Pld	W	D	L	GF	GA	GD	Pts	Qualification
1	Belgium	5	4	1	0	26	9	+17	13	Quarter-finals
2	Germany	5	3	0	2	19	10	+9	9	Quarter-finals
3	Great Britain	5	2	2	1	11	11	0	8	Quarter-finals
4	Netherlands	5	2	1	2	13	13	0	7	Quarter-finals
5	South Africa	5	1	1	3	16	24	−8	4	
6	Canada	5	0	1	4	9	27	−18	1	

Source: Tokyo 2020 and FIH
Rules for classification: 1) points; 2) matches won; 3) goal difference; 4) goals for; 5) head-to-head result; 6) field goals scored.

24 July 2021
19:00
v

Canada	1–7	Germany
K. Pereira 16'	Report	Windfeder 11', 28'; Rühr 22', 25'; Häner 44'; Bosserhoff 59'; Grambusch 60'

South Pitch
Umpires:
Peter Wright (RSA)
Francisco Vázquez (ESP)

26 July 2021
09:30
v

Germany	1–3	Belgium
Häner 51'	Report	Charlier 5', 7'; Hendrickx 35'

North Pitch
Umpires:
Coen van Bunge (NED)
David Tomlinson (NZL)

27 July 2021
12:15
v

Germany	5–1	Great Britain
Fuchs 15', 51', 60'; Rühr 35'; Weigand 42'	Report	Roper 8'

South Pitch
Umpires:
Simon Taylor (NZL)
Adam Kearns (AUS)

29 July 2021
11:45
v

South Africa	4–3	Germany
Guise-Brown 9'; Horne 13'; Spooner 45'; M. Cassiem 48'	Report	Herzbruch 8'; Windfeder 22'; Staib 24'

North Pitch
Umpires:
David Tomlinson (NZL)
Javed Shaikh (IND)

30 July 2021
20:45
v

Germany	3–1	Netherlands
Wellen 10'; Staib 41'; Herzbruch 54'	Report	Hertzberger 57'

North Pitch
Umpires:
Marcin Grochal (POL)
Adam Kearns (AUS)

Quarterfinal

1 August 2021
09:30
v

Germany	3–1	Argentina
Windfeder 19', 48'; Herzbruch 40'	Report	Casella 52'

Umpires:
Coen van Bunge (NED)
Jakub Mejzlík (CZE)

Semifinal

3 August 2021
19:00
v

Australia	3–1	Germany
Brand 7'; Govers 27'; Sharp 59'	Report	Windfeder 11'

Umpires:
Germán Montes de Oca (ARG)
Marcin Grochal (POL)

Bronze medal game

5 August 2021
10:30
v

Germany	4–5	India (bronze)
Oruz 2'; Wellen 24'; Fürk 25'; Windfeder 48'	Report	Simranjeet 17', 34'; Hardik 27'; Harmanpreet 29'; Rupinder 31'

Umpires:
Adam Kearns (AUS)
Simon Taylor (NZL)

=== Women's tournament ===
Germany women's national field hockey team qualified for the Olympics by securing one of the seven tickets available and defeating Italy in a playoff at the Mönchengladbach leg of the 2019 FIH Olympic Qualifiers.

Team roster

The squad was announced on 27 May 2021.

Head coach: (Belgium) Xavier Reckinger

No.	Pos.	Player	Date of birth (age)	Caps	Goals	Club
2	DF	Kira Horn	12 February 1995 (aged 26)	36	2	(Germany) Club an der Alster
3	MF	Amelie Wortmann	21 October 1996 (aged 24)	63	4	(Germany) UHC Hamburg
4	MF	Nike Lorenz (Captain)	12 March 1997 (aged 24)	120	33	(Germany) Rot-Weiss Köln
5	DF	Selin Oruz	5 February 1997 (aged 24)	104	2	(Germany) Düsseldorfer HC
8	FW	Anne Schröder	11 September 1994 (aged 26)	146	14	(Germany) Club an der Alster
11	MF	Lena Micheel	29 April 1998 (aged 23)	58	14	(Germany) UHC Hamburg
12	FW	Charlotte Stapenhorst	15 June 1995 (aged 26)	111	33	(Germany) UHC Hamburg
16	DF	Sonja Zimmermann	15 June 1999 (aged 22)	38	8	(Germany) Mannheimer HC
17	MF	Pauline Heinz	1 May 2001 (aged 20)	13	2	(Germany) Rüsselsheimer RK
18	FW	Lisa Altenburg	23 September 1989 (aged 31)	132	33	(Germany) Club an der Alster
19	DF	Maike Schaunig	13 March 1996 (aged 25)	49	0	(Germany) Uhlenhorst Mülheim
20	GK	Julia Ciupka	1 November 1991 (aged 29)	61	0	(Germany) Rot-Weiss Köln
21	MF	Franzisca Hauke	10 September 1989 (aged 31)	189	16	(Germany) Harvestehuder THC
22	FW	Cécile Pieper	31 August 1994 (aged 26)	123	14	(Germany) Rot-Weiss Köln
24	FW	Pia Maertens	6 January 1999 (aged 22)	42	22	(Germany) Rot-Weiss Köln
25	DF	Viktoria Huse	24 October 1995 (aged 25)	64	9	(Germany) Club an der Alster
28	MF	Jette Fleschütz	23 October 2002 (aged 18)	11	3	(Germany) Grosflottbek
30	DF	Hanna Granitzki	31 July 1997 (aged 23)	62	3	(Germany) Club an der Alster

Group play

Pos	Team	Pld	W	D	L	GF	GA	GD	Pts	Qualification
1	Netherlands	5	5	0	0	18	2	+16	15	Quarterfinals
2	Germany	5	4	0	1	13	7	+6	12	Quarterfinals
3	Great Britain	5	3	0	2	11	5	+6	9	Quarterfinals
4	India	5	2	0	3	7	14	−7	6	Quarterfinals
5	Ireland	5	1	0	4	4	11	−7	3	
6	South Africa	5	0	0	5	5	19	−14	0	

Source: Tokyo 2020 and FIH
Rules for classification: 1) points; 2) matches won; 3) goal difference; 4) goals for; 5) head-to-head result; 6) field goals scored.

25 July 2021
09:30
v

Great Britain	1–2	Germany
Jones 13'	Report	Huse 24'; Stapenhorst 33'

North Pitch
Umpires:
Liu Xiaoying (CHN)
Irene Presenqui (ARG)

26 July 2021
21:15
v

Germany	2–0	India
Lorenz 12'; Schröder 35'	Report

South Pitch
Umpires:
Sarah Wilson (GBR)
Emi Yamada (JPN)

28 July 2021
12:15
v

Germany	4–2	Ireland
Altenburg 10', 40'; Pieper 20'; Hauke 55'	Report	Tice 42'; McLoughlin 51'

South Pitch
Umpires:
Michelle Joubert (RSA)
Sarah Wilson (GBR)

30 July 2021
09:30
v

South Africa	1–4	Germany
Marks 53'	Report	Altenburg 2', 24'; Zimmermann 10'; Schröder 49'

North Pitch
Umpires:
Emi Yamada (JPN)
Maggie Giddens (USA)

31 July 2021
18:30
v

Germany	1–3	Netherlands
Zimmermann 23'	Report	Matla 8', 56'; Welten 14'

North Pitch
Umpires:
Irene Presenqui (ARG)
Kelly Hudson (NZL)

Quarterfinal

2 August 2021
09:30
v

Germany	0–3	Argentina
	Report	Albertario 27'; V. Granatto 29'; Raposo 52'

Umpires:
Laurine Delforge (BEL)
Amber Church (NZL)

== Football ==
Summary

Key:

- A.E.T – After extra time.
- P – Match decided by penalty-shootout.

Team	Event	Group stage				Quarterfinal	Semi-final	Final / BM	
Team	Event	Opposition Score	Opposition Score	Opposition Score	Rank	Opposition Score	Opposition Score	Opposition Score	Rank
Germany men's	Men's tournament	Brazil; L 2–4	Saudi Arabia; W 3–2	Ivory Coast; D 1–1	3	Did not advance			

=== Men's tournament ===
Germany men's football team qualified for the Games by advancing to the semi-final stage of the 2019 UEFA European Under-21 Championship in Italy.

Team roster

Germany's final squad was announced on 4 July 2021. Ragnar Ache and Keven Schlotterbeck were nominated five days later, after Josha Vagnoman and Niklas Dorsch withdrew.

Head coach: Stefan Kuntz

No.	Pos.	Player	Date of birth (age)	Caps	Goals	Club
1	GK	Florian Müller	13 November 1997 (aged 23)	0	0	(German Football Association) SC Freiburg
2	DF	Benjamin Henrichs	23 February 1997 (aged 24)	5	0	(German Football Association) RB Leipzig
3	DF	David Raum	22 April 1998 (aged 23)	0	0	(German Football Association) Greuther Fürth
4	DF	Felix Uduokhai	9 September 1997 (aged 23)	0	0	(German Football Association) FC Augsburg
5	DF	Amos Pieper	17 January 1998 (aged 23)	0	0	(German Football Association) Arminia Bielefeld
6	FW	Ragnar Ache	28 July 1998 (aged 22)	0	0	(German Football Association) Eintracht Frankfurt
7	MF	Marco Richter	24 November 1997 (aged 23)	0	0	(German Football Association) FC Augsburg
8	MF	Maximilian Arnold* (captain)	27 May 1994 (aged 27)	1	0	(German Football Association) VfL Wolfsburg
9	FW	Cedric Teuchert	14 January 1997 (aged 24)	0	0	(German Football Association) Union Berlin
10	FW	Max Kruse*	19 March 1988 (aged 33)	14	4	(German Football Association) Union Berlin
11	MF	Nadiem Amiri*	27 October 1996 (aged 24)	5	0	(German Football Association) Bayer Leverkusen
12	GK	Svend Brodersen	22 March 1997 (aged 24)	0	0	(German Football Association) FC St. Pauli
13	MF	Arne Maier	8 January 1999 (aged 22)	0	0	(German Football Association) Arminia Bielefeld
14	MF	Ismail Jakobs	17 August 1999 (aged 21)	0	0	(German Football Association) 1. FC Köln
15	DF	Jordan Torunarigha	7 August 1997 (aged 23)	0	0	(German Football Association) Hertha BSC
16	DF	Keven Schlotterbeck	28 April 1997 (aged 24)	0	0	(German Football Association) SC Freiburg
17	MF	Anton Stach	15 November 1998 (aged 22)	0	0	(German Football Association) Greuther Fürth
18	MF	Eduard Löwen	28 January 1997 (aged 24)	0	0	(German Football Association) Hertha BSC
22	GK	Luca Plogmann	10 March 2000 (aged 21)	0	0	(German Football Association) SV Meppen

* Overage player.

Group play

Pos	Team	Pld	W	D	L	GF	GA	GD	Pts	Qualification
1	Brazil	3	2	1	0	7	3	+4	7	Advance to knockout stage
2	Ivory Coast	3	1	2	0	3	2	+1	5	Advance to knockout stage
3	Germany	3	1	1	1	6	7	−1	4	
4	Saudi Arabia	3	0	0	3	4	8	−4	0	

Source: TOCOG and FIFA
Rules for classification: Group stage tiebreakers
22 July 2021
20:30

Brazil	4–2	Germany
Richarlison 7', 22', 30'; Paulinho 90+5'	Report (TOCOG); Report (FIFA)	Amiri 57'; Ache 84'

International Stadium Yokohama, Yokohama
Referee: Iván Barton (El Salvador)

25 July 2021
20:30

Saudi Arabia	2–3	Germany
Al-Najei 30', 50'	Report (TOCOG); Report (FIFA)	Amiri 11'; Ache 43'; Uduokhai 75'

International Stadium Yokohama, Yokohama
Referee: Victor Gomes (South Africa)

28 July 2021
17:00

Germany	1–1	Ivory Coast
Löwen 73'	Report (TOCOG); Report (FIFA)	Henrichs 67' (o.g.)

Miyagi Stadium, Rifu
Attendance: 4,294
Referee: Leodán González (Uruguay)

== Golf ==
Germany entered two male and two female golfers into the Olympic tournament. Maximilian Kieffer and Hurly Long qualified among the top 60 eligible players for the men's event after Martin Kaymer and Stephan Jäger withdrew.

Athlete	Event	Round 1	Round 2	Round 3	Round 4	Total		
Athlete	Event	Score	Score	Score	Score	Score	Par	Rank
Maximilian Kieffer	Men's	73	69	67	71	280	−4	=45
Hurly Long	Men's	70	70	70	67	277	−7	=35
Caroline Masson	Women's	71	70	68	75	284	E	=40
Sophia Popov	Women's	71	72	70	71	284	E	=40

== Gymnastics ==
=== Artistic ===
Germany fielded a full squad of four gymnasts in each the women's and men's artistic gymnastics events by finishing in the top nine nations eligible for qualification in the team all-around at the 2019 World Artistic Gymnastics Championships in Stuttgart. The members of both teams were announced on 13 June 2021.

Men
Team

Athlete	Event	Qualification								Final							
Athlete	Event	Apparatus						Total	Rank	Apparatus						Total	Rank
Athlete	Event	F	PH	R	V	PB	HB	Total	Rank	F	PH	R	V	PB	HB	Total	Rank
Lukas Dauser	Team	13.766	13.666	13.533	13.600	15.733 Q	13.433	83.731	20 Q	11.500	12.100	—N/a	13.700	15.466	13.600	—N/a	
Nils Dunkel	Team	12.933	14.133	13.600	13.533	14.433	13.000	81.632	32	—N/a	13.700	13.600	—N/a	12.733	13.033	—N/a	
Philipp Herder	Team	13.733	13.233	13.333	14.533	14.500	13.100	82.432	27 Q	11.866	—N/a	13.200	14.333	14.566	—N/a	—N/a	
Andreas Toba	Team	12.833	13.700	13.733	14.000	14.100	13.800	82.166	30	11.466	13.400	13.533	14.333	—N/a	12.366	—N/a	
Total	Team	40.432	41.499	40.866	42.133	44.666	40.333	249.929	6 Q	34.832	39.200	40.333	42.366	42.765	38.999	238.495	8

Individual finals

Athlete	Event	Qualification								Final							
Athlete	Event	Apparatus						Total	Rank	Apparatus						Total	Rank
Athlete	Event	F	PH	R	V	PB	HB	Total	Rank	F	PH	R	V	PB	HB	Total	Rank
Lukas Dauser	All-around	See team results								13.533	13.566	13.325	13.433	15.400	12.033	81.290	18
Lukas Dauser	Parallel bars	—N/a				15.733	—N/a	15.733	2 Q	—N/a				15.700	—N/a	15.700	2nd place, silver medalist(s)
Philipp Herder	All-around	See team results								13.133	12.100	12.833	13.666	14.000	12.833	78.565	23

Women
Team

Athlete	Event	Qualification						Final					
Athlete	Event	Apparatus				Total	Rank	Apparatus				Total	Rank
Athlete	Event	V	UB	BB	F	Total	Rank	V	UB	BB	F	Total	Rank
Kim Bui	Team	13.466	14.066	12.666	13.200	53.398	31 Q	Did not advance					
Pauline Schäfer	Team	13.933	11.933	12.966	12.733	51.565	50	Did not advance					
Elisabeth Seitz	Team	14.266	14.700 Q	12.333	12.933	54.332	19 Q	Did not advance					
Sarah Voss	Team	13.500	13.866	12.266	12.600	52.232	45	Did not advance					
Total	Team	41.699	42.632	37.965	38.866	161.162	9	Did not advance					

Individual finals

Athlete	Event	Qualification						Final					
Athlete	Event	Apparatus				Total	Rank	Apparatus				Total	Rank
Athlete	Event	V	UB	BB	F	Total	Rank	V	UB	BB	F	Total	Rank
Kim Bui	All-around	See team results						13.466	13.766	12.600	13.166	52.998	17
Elisabeth Seitz	All-around	See team results						14.200	14.500	12.933	12.433	54.066	9
Elisabeth Seitz	Uneven bars	—N/a	14.700	—N/a		14.700	=7 Q	—N/a	14.400	—N/a		14.400	5

== Handball ==
Summary

Key:

- ET: After extra time
- P – Match decided by penalty-shootout.

Team	Event	Group stage						Quarterfinal	Semifinal	Final / BM	
Team	Event	Opposition Score	Opposition Score	Opposition Score	Opposition Score	Opposition Score	Rank	Opposition Score	Opposition Score	Opposition Score	Rank
Germany men's	Men's tournament	Spain; L 27–28	Argentina; W 33–25	France; L 29–30	Norway; W 28–23	Brazil; W 29–25	3 Q	Egypt; L 26–31	Did not advance		

=== Men's tournament ===
Germany men's national handball team qualified for the Olympics by securing a top-two finish at the Berlin leg of the 2020 IHF Olympic Qualification Tournament.

Team roster

The squad was announced on 30 June 2021.

Head coach: (Iceland) Alfreð Gíslason

No.	Pos.	Name	Date of birth (age)	Height	App.	Goals	Club
1	GK	Johannes Bitter	2 September 1982 (aged 38)	2.05 m	161	1	(Germany) HSV Hamburg
3	LW	Uwe Gensheimer	26 October 1986 (aged 34)	1.88 m	196	945	(Germany) Rhein-Neckar Löwen
4	P	Johannes Golla	5 November 1997 (aged 23)	1.95 m	22	57	(Germany) SG Flensburg-Handewitt
6	LB	Finn Lemke	30 April 1992 (aged 29)	2.10 m	82	31	(Germany) MT Melsungen
13	P	Hendrik Pekeler	2 July 1991 (aged 30)	2.03 m	114	194	(Germany) THW Kiel
15	CB	Juri Knorr	9 May 2000 (aged 21)	1.90 m	11	13	(Germany) Rhein-Neckar Löwen
17	RB	Steffen Weinhold	19 July 1986 (aged 35)	1.91 m	129	307	(Germany) THW Kiel
20	LB	Philipp Weber	15 September 1992 (aged 28)	1.94 m	43	108	(Germany) SC Magdeburg
25	RB	Kai Häfner	10 July 1989 (aged 32)	1.92 m	104	228	(Germany) MT Melsungen
31	LW	Marcel Schiller	15 August 1991 (aged 29)	1.89 m	20	89	(Germany) Frisch Auf Göppingen
33	GK	Andreas Wolff	3 March 1991 (aged 30)	1.98 m	102	13	(Poland) Łomża Vive Kielce
35	LB	Julius Kühn	1 April 1993 (aged 28)	1.98 m	76	246	(Germany) MT Melsungen
48	P	Jannik Kohlbacher	19 July 1995 (aged 26)	1.93 m	75	158	(Germany) Rhein-Neckar Löwen
73	RW	Timo Kastening	25 June 1995 (aged 26)	1.80 m	27	89	(Germany) MT Melsungen
95	CB	Paul Drux	7 February 1995 (aged 26)	1.92 m	99	185	(Germany) Füchse Berlin

Group play

Pos	Team	Pld	W	D	L	GF	GA	GD	Pts	Qualification
1	France	5	4	0	1	162	148	+14	8 (Note: France 36–31 Spain)	Quarter-finals
2	Spain	5	4	0	1	155	142	+13	8	Quarter-finals
3	Germany	5	3	0	2	146	131	+15	6 (Note: Germany 28–23 Norway)	Quarter-finals
4	Norway	5	3	0	2	136	132	+4	6	Quarter-finals
5	Brazil	5	1	0	4	128	145	−17	2	
6	Argentina	5	0	0	5	125	154	−29	0	

Source: Tokyo 2020 and IHF
Rules for classification: 1) Points; 2) Head-to-head points; 3) Head-to-head goal difference; 4) Head-to-head goals scored; 5) Goal difference; 6) Goals scored; 7) Draw.
Notes:

24 July 2021; 16:15	Germany	27–28	Spain	Yoyogi National Gymnasium, Tokyo; Referees: Kurtagic, Wetterwik (SWE)
24 July 2021; 16:15	Weinhold 5	(13–12)	Figueras, Gómez 5	Yoyogi National Gymnasium, Tokyo; Referees: Kurtagic, Wetterwik (SWE)
24 July 2021; 16:15	2× (yellow card) 5× (suspension)	Report	2× (yellow card) 2× (suspension)	Yoyogi National Gymnasium, Tokyo; Referees: Kurtagic, Wetterwik (SWE)

26 July 2021; 11:00	Argentina	25–33	Germany	Yoyogi National Gymnasium, Tokyo; Referees: Horáček, Novotný (CZE)
26 July 2021; 11:00	Martínez, D. Simonet 5	(13–14)	Kastening, Schiller 7	Yoyogi National Gymnasium, Tokyo; Referees: Horáček, Novotný (CZE)
26 July 2021; 11:00	3× (yellow card) 4× (suspension)	Report	2× (yellow card) 3× (suspension) 1× (red card)	Yoyogi National Gymnasium, Tokyo; Referees: Horáček, Novotný (CZE)

28 July 2021; 21:30	France	30–29	Germany	Yoyogi National Gymnasium, Tokyo; Referees: Nachevski, Nikolov (MKD)
28 July 2021; 21:30	Mem 6	(16–13)	Kastening 7	Yoyogi National Gymnasium, Tokyo; Referees: Nachevski, Nikolov (MKD)
28 July 2021; 21:30	1× (yellow card)	Report	1× (yellow card) 1× (suspension)	Yoyogi National Gymnasium, Tokyo; Referees: Nachevski, Nikolov (MKD)

30 July 2021; 21:30	Germany	28–23	Norway	Yoyogi National Gymnasium, Tokyo; Referees: Brunner, Salah (SUI)
30 July 2021; 21:30	Gensheimer 6	(14–11)	Sagosen 7	Yoyogi National Gymnasium, Tokyo; Referees: Brunner, Salah (SUI)
30 July 2021; 21:30	2× (yellow card) 3× (suspension)	Report	1× (yellow card) 6× (suspension) 1× (red card)	Yoyogi National Gymnasium, Tokyo; Referees: Brunner, Salah (SUI)

1 August 2021; 19:30	Germany	29–25	Brazil	Yoyogi National Gymnasium, Tokyo; Referees: Horáček, Novotný (CZE)
1 August 2021; 19:30	Knorr, Weinhold 6	(16–12)	Dutra 7	Yoyogi National Gymnasium, Tokyo; Referees: Horáček, Novotný (CZE)
1 August 2021; 19:30	1× (yellow card) 3× (suspension)	Report	2× (yellow card) 2× (suspension)	Yoyogi National Gymnasium, Tokyo; Referees: Horáček, Novotný (CZE)

Quarterfinal

3 August 2021; 20:45	Germany	26–31	Egypt	Yoyogi National Gymnasium, Tokyo; Referees: Nikolov, Nachevski (MKD)
3 August 2021; 20:45	Golla, Kühn 6	(12–16)	Omar, Zein 5	Yoyogi National Gymnasium, Tokyo; Referees: Nikolov, Nachevski (MKD)
3 August 2021; 20:45	1× (yellow card) 3× (suspension)	Report	1× (yellow card) 1× (suspension)	Yoyogi National Gymnasium, Tokyo; Referees: Nikolov, Nachevski (MKD)

== Judo ==
Germany has qualified a squad of 13 judokas (seven men and six women) for each of the following weight classes at the Games by virtue of their top 18 finish in the IJF World Ranking List of 28 June 2021.

Men

Athlete	Event	Round of 64	Round of 32	Round of 16	Quarterfinals	Semifinals	Repechage	Final / BM	
Athlete	Event	Opposition Result	Opposition Result	Opposition Result	Opposition Result	Opposition Result	Opposition Result	Opposition Result	Rank
Moritz Plafky	−60 kg	—N/a	Verstraeten (BEL); L 00–01	Did not advance					
Sebastian Seidl	−66 kg	—N/a	Shamilov (ROC); L 00–10	Did not advance					
Igor Wandtke	−73 kg	Bye	Turaev (UZB); L 00–10	Did not advance					
Dominic Ressel	−81 kg	Bye	Abu Rmilah (PLE); W 10–00	de Wit (NED); W 01–00	Nagase (JPN); L 00–01	Did not advance	Khubetsov (ROC); W 10–00	Borchashvili (AUT); L 00–10	5
Eduard Trippel	−90 kg	Bye	Majdov (SRB); W 01–00	Gwak D-h (KOR); W 10–00	Tóth (HUN); W 01–00	Žgank (TUR); W 01–00	Bye	Bekauri (GEO); L 00–01	2nd place, silver medalist(s)
Karl-Richard Frey	−100 kg	—N/a	Sviryd (BLR); W 10–00	Korrel (NED); W 01–00	Cho G-h (KOR); L 00–01	Did not advance	Ilyasov (ROC); L 00–01	Did not advance	7
Johannes Frey	+100 kg	—N/a	Mahjoub (EOR); L 00–01	Did not advance					

Women

Athlete	Event	Round of 32	Round of 16	Quarterfinals	Semifinals	Repechage	Final / BM	
Athlete	Event	Opposition Result	Opposition Result	Opposition Result	Opposition Result	Opposition Result	Opposition Result	Rank
Katharina Menz	−48 kg	Vargas (CHI); L 00–01	Did not advance					
Theresa Stoll	−57 kg	Bye	Liparteliani (GEO); L 00–10	Did not advance				
Martyna Trajdos	−63 kg	Özbas (HUN); L 00–01	Did not advance					
Giovanna Scoccimarro	−70 kg	Rodríguez (VEN); W 01–00	Coughlan (AUS); W 10–00	Arai (JPN); L 00–10	Did not advance	Teltsidou (GRE); W 10–00	van Dijke (NED); L 00–10	5
Anna-Maria Wagner	−78 kg	Bye	Sampaio (POR); W 10–00	Aguiar (BRA); W 01–00	Hamada (JPN); L 00–10	Bye	Antomarchi (CUB); W 01–00	3rd place, bronze medalist(s)
Jasmin Grabowski	+78 kg	Xu S (CHN); L 00–10	Did not advance					

Mixed

Athlete	Event	Round of 16	Quarterfinals	Semifinals	Repechage	Final / BM	
Athlete	Event	Opposition Result	Opposition Result	Opposition Result	Opposition Result	Opposition Result	Rank
Johannes Frey; Karl-Richard Frey; Dominic Ressel; Sebastian Seidl; Eduard Trippel; Igor Wandtke; Jasmin Grabowski; Giovanna Scoccimarro; Theresa Stoll; Martyna Trajdos; Anna-Maria Wagner	Team	Refugee Olympic Team; W 4–0	Japan; L 2–4	Did not advance	Mongolia; W 4–2	Netherlands; W 4–2	3rd place, bronze medalist(s)

== Karate ==
Germany entered four karateka into the inaugural Olympic tournament. 2018 world champion Jonathan Horne qualified directly for the men's kumite +75-kg category by finishing among the top four karateka at the end of the combined WKF Olympic Rankings. Meanwhile, Noah Bitsch (men's 75 kg) and Jasmin Jüttner (women's kata) secured places on the German squad in their respective weight categories by finishing among the top four in the final pool round of the 2021 World Qualification Tournament in Paris, France.

Kumite

Athlete	Event	Group stage					Semifinals	Final	
Athlete	Event	Opposition Result	Opposition Result	Opposition Result	Opposition Result	Rank	Opposition Result	Opposition Result	Rank
Noah Bitsch	Men's −75 kg	Aghayev (AZE); L 1–2	Azhikanov (KAZ); W 3–3	Busà (ITA); L 2–2	Yahiro (AUS); W 5–3	3	Did not advance		
Jonathan Horne	Men's +75 kg	Yuldashev (KAZ); D 4–4	Arkania (GEO); L 4^{K}–3	Araga (JPN); L WO	Aktaş (TUR); L WO	DSQ	Did not advance		

Kata

Athlete	Event	Elimination round		Ranking round		Final / BM	
Athlete	Event	Score	Rank	Score	Rank	Opposition Result	Rank
Ilja Smorguner	Men's	24.56	4	Did not advance			
Jasmin Jüttner	Women's	24.29	4	Did not advance			

== Modern pentathlon ==
German athletes qualified for the following spots in the modern pentathlon at the Games. Rio 2016 Olympian Patrick Dogue and two-time veteran Annika Schleu confirmed one of the eight Olympic places available each in the men's and women's event, respectively, through the 2019 European Championships in Bath, England. Meanwhile, Janine Kohlmann and Fabian Liebig were automatically selected among the top nine modern pentathletes eligible for qualification in their respective individual events based on the UIPM World Rankings of 14 June 2021.

Athlete	Event	Fencing (épée one touch)				Swimming (200 m freestyle)			Riding (show jumping)			Combined: shooting/running (10 m air pistol)/(3200 m)			Total points	Final rank
Athlete	Event	RR	BR	Rank	MP points	Time	Rank	MP points	Penalties	Rank	MP points	Time	Rank	MP points	Total points	Final rank
Patrick Dogue	Men's	11–24	1	31	167	2:04.27	24	302	0	2	300	11:00.99	6	640	1409	20
Fabian Liebig	Men's	16–19	0	25	196	2:03.02	19	304	21	23	279	11:08.69	12	632	1411	19
Rebecca Langrehr	Women's	20–15	1	9	221	2:17.38	28	276	80	30	220	12:49.26	20	531	1248	28
Annika Schleu	Women's	29–6	0	1	274	2:16.99	24	277	EL		0	12:43.20	18	537	1088	31

== Rowing ==
Germany qualified seven boats for each of the following rowing classes into the Olympic regatta, with the majority of crews confirming Olympic places for their boats at the 2019 FISA World Championships in Ottensheim, Austria. Meanwhile, the women's double sculls boat was awarded to the German roster with a top-two finish at the 2021 FISA Final Qualification Regatta in Lucerne, Switzerland.

Twenty-seven rowers (20 men and 7 women) were officially selected as part of the nation's third batch of nominated athletes on 15 June 2021, including Rio 2016 champions Hans Gruhne (men's quadruple sculls) and two-time Olympian Annekatrin Thiele (women's double sculls).

Men

Athlete	Event	Heats		Repechage		Quarterfinals		Semifinals		Final	
Athlete	Event	Time	Rank	Time	Rank	Time	Rank	Time	Rank	Time	Rank
Oliver Zeidler	Single sculls	7:00.40	1 QF	Bye		7:12.75	1 SA/B	6:45.16	4 FB	6:44.44	7
Stephan Krüger; Marc Weber	Double sculls	6:35.11	4 R	6:26.64	1 SA/B	—N/a		6:38.41	5 FB	6:18.13	11
Jason Osborne; Jonathan Rommelmann	Lightweight double sculls	6:21.71	1 SA/B	Bye		—N/a		6:07.33 OR	1 FA	6:07.29	2nd place, silver medalist(s)
Max Appel; Hans Gruhne; Tim Ole Naske; Karl Schulze	Quadruple sculls	5:50.11	5 R	6:02.86	5 FB	—N/a				5:46.78	8
Laurits Follert; Malte Jakschik; Torben Johannesen; Hannes Ocik; Olaf Roggensack; Martin Sauer; Richard Schmidt; Jakob Schneider; Johannes Weißenfeld	Eight	5:28.95	1 FA	Bye		—N/a				5:25.60	2nd place, silver medalist(s)

Women

Athlete	Event	Heats		Repechage		Semifinals		Final	
Athlete	Event	Time	Rank	Time	Rank	Time	Rank	Time	Rank
Leonie Menzel; Annekatrin Thiele	Double sculls	6:59.61	4 R	7:14.92	2 SA/B	7:20.44	6 FB	7:01.21	11
Frieda Hämmerling; Franziska Kampmann; Carlotta Nwajide; Daniela Schultze	Quadruple sculls	6:18.22	1 FA	Bye		—N/a		6:13.41	5

Qualification Legend: FA=Final A (medal); FB=Final B (non-medal); FC=Final C (non-medal); FD=Final D (non-medal); FE=Final E (non-medal); FF=Final F (non-medal); SA/B=Semifinals A/B; SC/D=Semifinals C/D; SE/F=Semifinals E/F; QF=Quarterfinals; R=Repechage

== Sailing ==
German sailors qualified one boat in each of the following classes through the 2018 Sailing World Championships, the class-associated Worlds, and the continental regattas.

Philipp Buhl became the first German sailor to be selected to the Olympic team, following his gold-medal victory in the Laser class at the 2020 Worlds in Melbourne, Australia. Skiff crews Tina Lutz and Susann Beucke (49erFX), along with Rio 2016 bronze medalists Erik Heil and Thomas Plößel, secured their country's Olympic spots at the Kiel Week regatta, while Svenja Weger and the Nacra 17 crew (Kohlhoff & Stuhlemmer) scored a top-ten placement at their respective individual-fleet Europeans to lock the spots on the German sailing roster for the rescheduled Games. The women's 470 crew (Wanser & Winkel) rounded out the selection at the 2021 Worlds in Vilamoura, Portugal.

Men

Athlete	Event	Race													Net points	Final rank
Athlete	Event	1	2	3	4	5	6	7	8	9	10	11	12	M*	Net points	Final rank
Philipp Buhl	Laser	10	2	10	21	12	22	4	3	~~32~~	1	—N/a		3	91	5
Erik Heil; Thomas Plößel	49er	3	13	5	~~14~~	3	4	1	7	12	2	14	5	2	70	3rd place, bronze medalist(s)

Women

Athlete	Event	Race													Net points	Final rank
Athlete	Event	1	2	3	4	5	6	7	8	9	10	11	12	M*	Net points	Final rank
Svenja Weger	Laser Radial	5	1	21	~~29~~	14	29	8	12	12	29	—N/a		EL	131	16
Luise Wanser; Anastasiya Winkel	470	~~22~~	22	5	4	16	8	7	1	5	6	—N/a		2	77	6
Susann Beucke; Tina Lutz	49erFX	5	6	8	3	~~14~~	12	11	13	3	7	3	3	5	83	2nd place, silver medalist(s)

Mixed

Athlete	Event	Race													Net points	Final rank
Athlete	Event	1	2	3	4	5	6	7	8	9	10	11	12	M*	Net points	Final rank
Paul Kohlhoff; Alica Stuhlemmer	Nacra 17	5	1	7	3	3	~~11~~	3	2	8	3	6	6	8	63	3rd place, bronze medalist(s)

M = Medal race; EL = Eliminated – did not advance into the medal race

== Shooting ==
German shooters achieved quota places for the following events by virtue of their best finishes at the 2018 ISSF World Championships, the 2019 ISSF World Cup series, European Championships or Games, and European Qualifying Tournament, as long as they obtained a minimum qualifying score (MQS) by 31 May 2020.

The pistol shooters, led by the defending Olympic champion Christian Reitz (men's rapid fire pistol) and Rio 2016 silver medalist Monika Karsch (women's sport pistol), were named as part of the first batch of nominated German athletes for Tokyo 2020 on 19 May 2021. Rifle markswoman Jolyn Beer, air pistol shooter Carina Wimmer, and trap shooter Andreas Löw, who earned a direct place as the highest-ranked shooter vying for qualification in the men's trap based on the ISSF World Olympic Rankings, joined the shooting squad on 15 June 2021.

Men

Athlete	Event	Qualification		Final	
Athlete	Event	Points	Rank	Points	Rank
Oliver Geis	25 m rapid fire pistol	577	13	Did not advance	
Andreas Löw	Trap	121	15	Did not advance	
Christian Reitz	10 m air pistol	584	3 Q	176.6	5
Christian Reitz	25 m rapid fire pistol	587	1 Q	18	5

Women

Athlete	Event	Qualification		Final	
Athlete	Event	Points	Rank	Points	Rank
Jolyn Beer	10 m air rifle	625.8	17	Did not advance	
Jolyn Beer	50 m rifle 3 positions	1178	3 Q	417.8	6
Monika Karsch	10 m air pistol	568	29	Did not advance	
Monika Karsch	25 m pistol	580	20	Did not advance	
Nadine Messerschmidt	Skeet	120	5 Q	26	5
Doreen Vennekamp	25 m pistol	586	4 Q	14	7
Carina Wimmer	10 m air pistol	571	20	Did not advance	

Mixed

Athlete	Event	Qualification		Semifinal		Final	
Athlete	Event	Points	Rank	Points	Rank	Points	Rank
Carina Wimmer; Christian Reitz	10 m air pistol team	571	12	Did not advance			

== Skateboarding ==
Germany entered two skateboarders (one per gender) to compete across all events at the Games. Tyler Edtmayer and Lilly Stoephasius were automatically selected among the top 16 eligible skateboarders in the men's and women's park, respectively, based on the World Skate Olympic Rankings of 30 June 2021.

Athlete	Event	Qualification		Final	
Athlete	Event	Result	Rank	Result	Rank
Tyler Edtmayer	Men's park	61.78	15	Did not advance	
Lilly Stoephasius	Women's park	38.37	9	Did not advance	

== Sport climbing ==
Germany entered two sport climbers into the Olympic tournament. Alexander Megos qualified directly for the men's combined event, by advancing to the final and securing one of the seven provisional berths at the 2019 IFSC World Championships in Hachiōji, Japan. Meanwhile, Jan Hojer finished in the top six of those eligible for qualification at the IFSC World Qualifying Event in Toulouse, France, earning a quota place and joining with Megos on the German roster.

Athlete	Event	Qualification									Final								
Athlete	Event	Speed		Boulder		Lead			Total	Rank	Speed		Boulder		Lead			Total	Rank
Athlete	Event	Best	Place	Result	Place	Hold	Time	Place	Total	Rank	Best	Place	Result	Place	Hold	Time	Place	Total	Rank
Alexander Megos	Men's	7.47	18	1T4z 2 15	6	36+	–	6	684.00	9	Did not advance								
Jan Hojer	Men's	6.63	10	1T3z 3 8	9	29+	–	9	891.00	12	Did not advance								

== Surfing ==
Germany sent one surfer to compete in the men's shortboard at the Games. Leon Glatzer scored a top-two finish within his heat to book one of the five available places at the 2021 ISA World Surfing Games in El Salvador.

Athlete	Event	Round 1		Round 2		Round 3	Quarterfinal	Semifinal	Final / BM	
Athlete	Event	Points	Rank	Points	Rank	Opposition Result	Opposition Result	Opposition Result	Opposition Result	Rank
Leon Glatzer	Men's shortboard	10.00	3 q	10.43	4	Did not advance				

== Swimming ==
German swimmers further achieved qualifying standards in the following events (up to a maximum of 2 swimmers in each event at the Olympic Qualifying Time (OQT), and potentially 1 at the Olympic Selection Time (OST)): Because of the consequent effects brought by the COVID-19 pandemic, the German Swimming Federation (German: Deutscher Schwimm-Verband, DSV) released a revised policy to select the country's best swimmers for the rescheduled Games: the top four of each individual event at the 2019 Worlds while also fulfilling the federation's mandated standards; those who attained the federation's qualifying standards between 1 January to 31 March 2020, and those who attained the federation's qualifying standards at an approved meet during the remaining time frame.

Thirty swimmers (17 men and 13 women) were officially named to the German roster on 19 May 2021, including 2019 world champion Florian Wellbrock in both the men's long-distance freestyle and open water, 2015 world champion Marco Koch in the men's 200 m breaststroke, 2019 world silver medalist Sarah Köhler in the women's long-distance freestyle, and two-time Olympian Annika Bruhn in the women's sprint and middle-distance freestyle.

Men

Athlete	Event	Heat		Semifinal		Final	
Athlete	Event	Time	Rank	Time	Rank	Time	Rank
Ole Braunschweig	100 m backstroke	54.14	25	Did not advance			
Christian Diener	200 m backstroke	1:58.27	19	Did not advance			
Jacob Heidtmann	200 m freestyle	1:46.73	19	Did not advance			
Jacob Heidtmann	200 m individual medley	1:58.80	23	Did not advance			
Jacob Heidtmann	400 m individual medley	4:12.09	12	—N/a		Did not advance	
Philip Heintz	200 m individual medley	1:57.72	13 Q	1:58.13	13	Did not advance	
Marco Koch	200 m breaststroke	2:10.18	20	Did not advance			
Marius Kusch	100 m butterfly	52.05	23	Did not advance			
Lukas Märtens	200 m freestyle	1:46.69	=17	Did not advance			
Lukas Märtens	400 m freestyle	3:46.30	12	—N/a		Did not advance	
Lukas Märtens	1500 m freestyle	14:59.45	11	—N/a		Did not advance	
Lucas Matzerath	100 m breaststroke	59.40	11 Q	59.31	9	Did not advance	
Rob Muffels	10 km open water	—N/a				1:53:03.3	11
Henning Mühlleitner	400 m freestyle	3:43.67	1 Q	—N/a		3:44.07	=4
Fabian Schwingenschlögl	100 m breaststroke	59.49	14 Q	59.32	10	Did not advance	
David Thomasberger	200 m butterfly	1:56.04	17	Did not advance			
Marek Ulrich	100 m backstroke	53.74	14 Q	53.54	13	Did not advance	
Florian Wellbrock	800 m freestyle	7:41.77 NR	2 Q	—N/a		7:42.68	4
Florian Wellbrock	1500 m freestyle	14:48.53	3 Q	—N/a		14:40.91	3rd place, bronze medalist(s)
Florian Wellbrock	10 km open water	—N/a				1:48:33.7	1st place, gold medalist(s)
Damian Wierling	100 m freestyle	48.83	26	Did not advance			
Christoph Fildebrandt; Eric Friese; Marius Kusch; Damian Wierling	4 × 100 m freestyle relay	3:15.34	16	—N/a		Did not advance	
Jacob Heidtmann; Lukas Märtens; Henning Mühlleitner; Poul Zellmann	4 × 200 m freestyle relay	7:06.76	7 Q	—N/a		7:06.51	7
Marius Kusch; Lucas Matzerath; Marek Ulrich; Damian Wierling	4 × 100 m medley relay	3:34.08	11	—N/a		Did not advance	

Women

Athlete	Event	Heat		Semifinal		Final	
Athlete	Event	Time	Rank	Time	Rank	Time	Rank
Leonie Beck	10 km open water	—N/a				1:59:35.1	5
Annika Bruhn	200 m freestyle	1:57.15	13 Q	1:57.62	14	Did not advance	
Anna Elendt	100 m breaststroke	1:06.96	16 Q	1:07.31	13	Did not advance	
Isabel Gose	200 m freestyle	1:56.80	9 Q	1:57.07	11	Did not advance	
Isabel Gose	400 m freestyle	4:03.21 NR	6 Q	—N/a		4:04.98	6
Isabel Gose	800 m freestyle	8:21.79	9	—N/a		Did not advance	
Franziska Hentke	200 m butterfly	2:09.98	11 Q	2:10.89	13	Did not advance	
Sarah Köhler	800 m freestyle	8:17.33	4 Q	—N/a		8:24.56	7
Sarah Köhler	1500 m freestyle	15:52.67	6 Q	—N/a		15:42.91 NR	3rd place, bronze medalist(s)
Leonie Kullmann	400 m freestyle	4:10.25	18	—N/a		Did not advance	
Laura Riedemann	100 m backstroke	1:00.81	24	Did not advance			
Celine Rieder	1500 m freestyle	16:32.57	27	—N/a		Did not advance	
Finnia Wunram	10 km open water	—N/a				2:01:01.9	10
Annika Bruhn; Lisa Höpink; Hannah Küchler; Marie Pietruschka	4 × 100 m freestyle relay	3:39.33	13	—N/a		Did not advance	
Annika Bruhn; Isabel Gose; Leonie Kullmann; Marie Pietruschka	4 × 200 m freestyle relay	7:52.06	6 Q	—N/a		7:53.89	6
Annika Bruhn; Anna Elendt; Lisa Höpink; Laura Riedemann	4 × 100 m medley relay	4:00.16	11	—N/a		Did not advance	

Mixed

Athlete	Event	Heat		Final	
Athlete	Event	Time	Rank	Time	Rank
Annika Bruhn; Lisa Höpink; Fabian Schwingenschlögl; Marek Ulrich	4 × 100 m medley relay	3:44.19	10	Did not advance	

== Table tennis ==
Germany entered six athletes into the table tennis competition at the Games. The men's and women's teams secured their respective Olympic berths by winning the gold medal each at the 2019 European Games in Minsk, Belarus, permitting a maximum of two starters to compete each in the men's and women's singles tournament, as well as the inaugural mixed doubles.

The men's and women's table tennis teams were officially named as part of the nation's first batch of nominated athletes for the Games on 19 May 2021, with Timo Boll leading the players to his sixth consecutive Games. Notable players also included four-time medalist Dimitrij Ovtcharov and Rio 2016 silver medalists Han Ying, Petrissa Solja, and Shan Xiaona.

Men

Athlete	Event	Preliminary	Round 1	Round 2	Round 3	Round of 16	Quarterfinals	Semifinals	Final / BM	
Athlete	Event	Opposition Result	Opposition Result	Opposition Result	Opposition Result	Opposition Result	Opposition Result	Opposition Result	Opposition Result	Rank
Timo Boll	Singles	Bye			Gerassimenko (KAZ); W 4–1	Jeoung Y-s (KOR); L 1–4	Did not advance			
Dimitrij Ovtcharov	Singles	Bye			Skachkov (ROC); W 4–0	Niwa (JPN); W 4–1	Calderano (BRA); W 4–2	Ma L (CHN); L 3–4	Lin Y-j (TPE); W 4–3	3rd place, bronze medalist(s)
Timo Boll; Patrick Franziska; Dimitrij Ovtcharov	Team	—N/a				Portugal; W 3–0	Chinese Taipei; W 3–2	Japan; W 3–2	China; L 0–3	2nd place, silver medalist(s)

Women

Athlete	Event	Preliminary	Round 1	Round 2	Round 3	Round of 16	Quarterfinals	Semifinals	Final / BM	
Athlete	Event	Opposition Result	Opposition Result	Opposition Result	Opposition Result	Opposition Result	Opposition Result	Opposition Result	Opposition Result	Rank
Han Ying	Singles	Bye			Lay (AUS); W 4–0	Feng Tw (SGP); W 4–1	Sun Ys (CHN); L 0–4	Did not advance		
Petrissa Solja	Singles	Bye			Zhang M (CAN); L 3–4	Did not advance				
Han Ying; Petrissa Solja; Shan Xiaona	Team	—N/a				Australia; W 3–0	South Korea; W 3–2	China; L 0–3	Hong Kong; L 1–3	4

Mixed

Athlete	Event	Round of 16	Quarterfinals	Semifinals	Final / BM	
Athlete	Event	Opposition Result	Opposition Result	Opposition Result	Opposition Result	Rank
Patrick Franziska; Petrissa Solja	Doubles	Campos / Fonseca (CUB); W 4–0	Mizutani / Ito (JPN); L 3–4	Did not advance		

== Taekwondo ==
Germany entered one athlete into the taekwondo competition at the Games. 2017 world champion Alexander Bachmann qualified directly for the men's heavyweight category (+80 kg) by finishing among the top five taekwondo practitioners at the end of the WT Olympic Rankings.

Athlete	Event	Round of 16	Quarterfinals	Semifinals	Repechage	Final / BM	
Athlete	Event	Opposition Result	Opposition Result	Opposition Result	Opposition Result	Opposition Result	Rank
Alexander Bachmann	Men's +80 kg	Zhaparov (KAZ); L 7–11	Did not advance				

== Tennis ==
Germany entered six tennis players (four men and two women) into the Olympic tournament. Top ranked player Alexander Zverev (world no. 6), Jan-Lennard Struff (world no. 45), Dominik Koepfer (world no. 53) and Philipp Kohlschreiber (world no. 128) were selected for the eligible players in the men's singles based on the ATP world rankings of 14 June 2021. Rio 2016 Olympian Laura Siegemund (world no. 55) selected for the women's singles as two into the top 58 players based on WTA rankings of 14 June 2021.

Having already qualified in singles, both Struff and Zverev have competed together in doubles, while Kevin Krawietz and Tim Pütz agreed to compete together. Siegemund is partnering with Anna-Lena Friedsam in the women's doubles.

Men

Athlete	Event	Round of 64	Round of 32	Round of 16	Quarterfinals	Semifinals	Final / BM	
Athlete	Event	Opposition Score	Opposition Score	Opposition Score	Opposition Score	Opposition Score	Opposition Score	Rank
Dominik Koepfer	Singles	Bagnis (ARG); W 3–6, 6–3, 7–5	Purcell (AUS); W 6–3, 6–0	Carreño Busta (ESP); L 6–7^{(7–9)}, 3–6	Did not advance			
Philipp Kohlschreiber	Singles	Tsitsipas (GRE); L 3–6, 6–3, 3–6	Did not advance					
Jan-Lennard Struff	Singles	Monteiro (BRA); W 6–3, 6–4	Djokovic (SRB); L 4–6, 3–6	Did not advance				
Alexander Zverev	Singles	Lu Y-h (TPE); W 6–1, 6–3	Galán (COL); W 6–2, 6–2	Basilashvili (GEO); W 6–3, 7–6^{(7–5)}	Chardy (FRA); W 6–4, 6–1	Djokovic (SRB); W 1–6, 6–3, 6–1	Khachanov (ROC); W 6–3, 6–1	1st place, gold medalist(s)
Kevin Krawietz; Tim Pütz	Doubles	—N/a	Bagnis / Schwartzman (ARG); W 6–2, 6–1	Murray / Salisbury (GBR); L 2–6, 6–7^{(2–7)}	Did not advance			
Jan-Lennard Struff; Alexander Zverev	Doubles	—N/a	Hurkacz / Kubot (POL); W 6–2, 7–6^{(7–5)}	Chardy / Monfils (FRA); W 6–3, 7–5	Krajicek / Sandgren (USA); L 3–6, 6–7^{(4–7)}	Did not advance		

Women

Athlete	Event	Round of 64	Round of 32	Round of 16	Quarterfinals	Semifinals	Final / BM	
Athlete	Event	Opposition Score	Opposition Score	Opposition Score	Opposition Score	Opposition Score	Opposition Score	Rank
Mona Barthel	Singles	Świątek (POL); L 2–6, 2–6	Did not advance					
Anna-Lena Friedsam	Singles	Watson (GBR); W 7–6^{(7–5)}, 6–3	Pavlyuchenkova (ROC); L 1–6, 1–6	Did not advance				
Laura Siegemund	Singles	Svitolina (UKR); L 3–6, 7–5, 4–6	Did not advance					
Anna-Lena Friedsam; Laura Siegemund	Doubles	—N/a	Kudermetova / Vesnina (ROC); L 2–6, 5–7	Did not advance				

Mixed

Athlete	Event	Round of 16	Quarterfinals	Semifinals	Final / BM	
Athlete	Event	Opposition Result	Opposition Result	Opposition Result	Opposition Result	Rank
Laura Siegemund; Kevin Krawietz	Doubles	Mattek-Sands / Ram (USA); W 6–4, 5–7, [10–8]	Stojanović / Djokovic (SRB); L 1–6, 2–6	Did not advance		

== Triathlon ==
Germany qualified four triathletes (two per gender) for the following events at the Games by finishing among the top seven nations in the ITU Mixed Relay Olympic Rankings.

Individual

Athlete	Event	Time						Rank
Athlete	Event	Swim (1.5 km)	Trans 1	Bike (40 km)	Trans 2	Run (10 km)	Total	Rank
Justus Nieschlag	Men's	18:09	0:42	56:14	0:33	34:32	1:50:10	40
Jonas Schomburg	Men's	17:42	0:38	58:38	0:34	32:02	1:49:34	38
Anabel Knoll	Women's	20:05	0:42	1:06:14	0:33	37:11	2:04:45	31
Laura Lindemann	Women's	18:36	0:41	1:02:46	0:33	35:48	1:58:24	8

Relay

Athlete	Event	Time						Rank
Athlete	Event	Swim (300 m)	Trans 1	Bike (7 km)	Trans 2	Run (2 km)	Total group	Rank
Justus Nieschlag	Mixed relay	4:09	0:39	9:40	0:26	5:40	20:34	—N/a
Jonas Schomburg	Mixed relay	4:01	0:36	9:36	0:28	5:46	20:27	—N/a
Anabel Knoll	Mixed relay	4:28	0:38	10:28	0:28	6:22	22:24	—N/a
Laura Lindemann	Mixed relay	3:48	0:38	10:09	0:29	6:11	21:15	—N/a
Total	Mixed relay	—N/a					1:24:40	6

== Volleyball ==
=== Beach ===
Three German beach volleyball teams (one men's and two women's) qualified directly for the Olympics by virtue of their nation's top 15 placement in the FIVB Olympic Rankings of 13 June 2021.

Athlete	Event	Preliminary round				Repechage	Round of 16	Quarterfinals	Semifinals	Final / BM	
Athlete	Event	Opposition Score	Opposition Score	Opposition Score	Rank	Opposition Score	Opposition Score	Opposition Score	Opposition Score	Opposition Score	Rank
Julius Thole; Clemens Wickler	Men's	Lupo / Nicolai (ITA); L (21–19, 19–21, 13–15)	Kantor / Łosiak (POL); W (22–20, 21–16)	Ishijima / Shiratori (JPN); W (21–16, 21–11)	2 Q	Bye	Bourne / Gibb (USA); W (17–21, 21–15, 15–11)	Krasilnikov / Stoyanovskiy (ROC); L (16–21, 19–21)	Did not advance		
Karla Borger; Julia Sude	Women's	Heidrich / Vergé-Dépré (SUI); L (8–21, 23–21, 6–15)	Humana-Parades / Pavan (CAN); L (17–21, 14–21)	Schoon / Stam (NED); L(20–22, 16–21)	4	Did not advance					
Laura Ludwig; Margareta Kozuch	Women's	Betschart / Hüberli (SUI); L (25–23, 20–22, 14–16)	Ishii / Murakami (JPN); W (21–17, 22–20)	Hermannová / Sluková (CZE); W (21–0, 21–0)	2 Q	Bye	Ágatha / Duda (BRA); W (21–19, 19–21, 16–14)	Klineman / Ross (USA); L (19–21, 19–21)	Did not advance		

== Weightlifting ==
Germany qualified three weightlifters for each of the following classes into the Olympic competition. Simon Brandhuber (men's 61 kg) and Rio 2016 Olympian Nico Müller secured one of the top eight slots each in their respective weight divisions based on the IWF Absolute World Ranking. On 17 June 2021, International Weightlifting Federation banned Romania to compete at the Games because of multiple doping cases; therefore, Lisa Schweizer sealed the vacant berth as the next highest-ranked weightlifter vying for qualification in the women's 64 kg category.

Athlete	Event	Snatch		Clean & jerk		Total	Rank
Athlete	Event	Result	Rank	Result	Rank	Total	Rank
Simon Brandhuber	Men's −61 kg	123	10	145	11	268	9
Nico Müller	Men's −81 kg	159	9	195	7	354	7
Sabine Beate Kusterer	Women's −59 kg	91	7	107	10	198	10
Lisa Schweizer	Women's −64 kg	100	8	117	10	217	10

== Wrestling ==
Germany qualified seven wrestlers for each of the following classes into the Olympic competition. Five of them finished among the top six to book Olympic spots in the men's Greco-Roman (67, 87 and 130 kg) and women's freestyle (68 and 76 kg) wrestling at the 2019 World Championships, while two additional licenses were awarded to the German wrestlers, who progressed to the top two finals of the men's freestyle 125 kg and men's Greco-Roman 60 kg at the 2021 European Olympic Qualification Tournament in Budapest, Hungary.

Key:

- VT (ranking points: 5–0 or 0–5) – Victory by fall.
- VB (ranking points: 5–0 or 0–5) – Victory by injury (VF for forfeit, VA for withdrawal or disqualification)
- PP (ranking points: 3–1 or 1–3) – Decision by points – the loser with technical points.
- PO (ranking points: 3–0 or 0–3) – Decision by points – the loser without technical points.
- ST (ranking points: 4–0 or 0–4) – Great superiority – the loser without technical points and a margin of victory of at least 8 (Greco-Roman) or 10 (freestyle) points.
- SP (ranking points: 4–1 or 1–4) – Technical superiority – the loser with technical points and a margin of victory of at least 8 (Greco-Roman) or 10 (freestyle) points.

Freestyle

Athlete	Event	Round of 16	Quarterfinal	Semifinal	Repechage	Final / BM	
Athlete	Event	Opposition Result	Opposition Result	Opposition Result	Opposition Result	Opposition Result	Rank
Gennadij Cudinovic	Men's −125 kg	Batirmurzaev (KAZ); W 5–0 ^{VT}	Mönkhtöriin (MGL); L 1–3 ^{PP}	Did not advance			8
Anna Schell	Women's −68 kg	Mostafa (EGY); W 3–0 ^{PO}	Cherkasova (UKR); L 0–5 ^{VT}	Did not advance			9
Aline Rotter-Focken	Women's −76 kg	Marzaliuk (BLR); W 3–1 ^{PP}	Zhou Q (CHN); W 3–1 ^{PP}	Minagawa (JPN); W 3–1 ^{PP}	Bye	Gray (USA); W 3–1 ^{PP}	1st place, gold medalist(s)

Greco-Roman

Athlete	Event	Round of 16	Quarterfinal	Semifinal	Repechage	Final / BM	
Athlete	Event	Opposition Result	Opposition Result	Opposition Result	Opposition Result	Opposition Result	Rank
Etienne Kinsinger	Men's −60 kg	Walihan S (CHN); L 1–3 ^{PP}	Did not advance				11
Frank Stäbler	Men's −67 kg	Nemeš (SRB); W 3–1 ^{PP}	Geraei (IRI); L 1–3 ^{PP}	Did not advance	Horta (COL); W 4–0 ^{ST}	Zoidze (GEO); W 3–1^{PP}	3rd place, bronze medalist(s)
Denis Kudla	Men's −87 kg	Tursynov (KAZ); W 3–1 ^{PP}	Lőrincz (HUN); L 1–3^{PP}	Did not advance	Azisbekov (KGZ); W 4–1 ^{SP}	Metwally (EGY); W 5–0 ^{VT}	3rd place, bronze medalist(s)
Eduard Popp	Men's −130 kg	Soghomonyan (BRA); W 3–0 ^{PO}	Kayaalp (TUR); L 1–3 ^{PP}	Did not advance			8
