= Maria Astashkina =

Russian swimmer (born 1999)

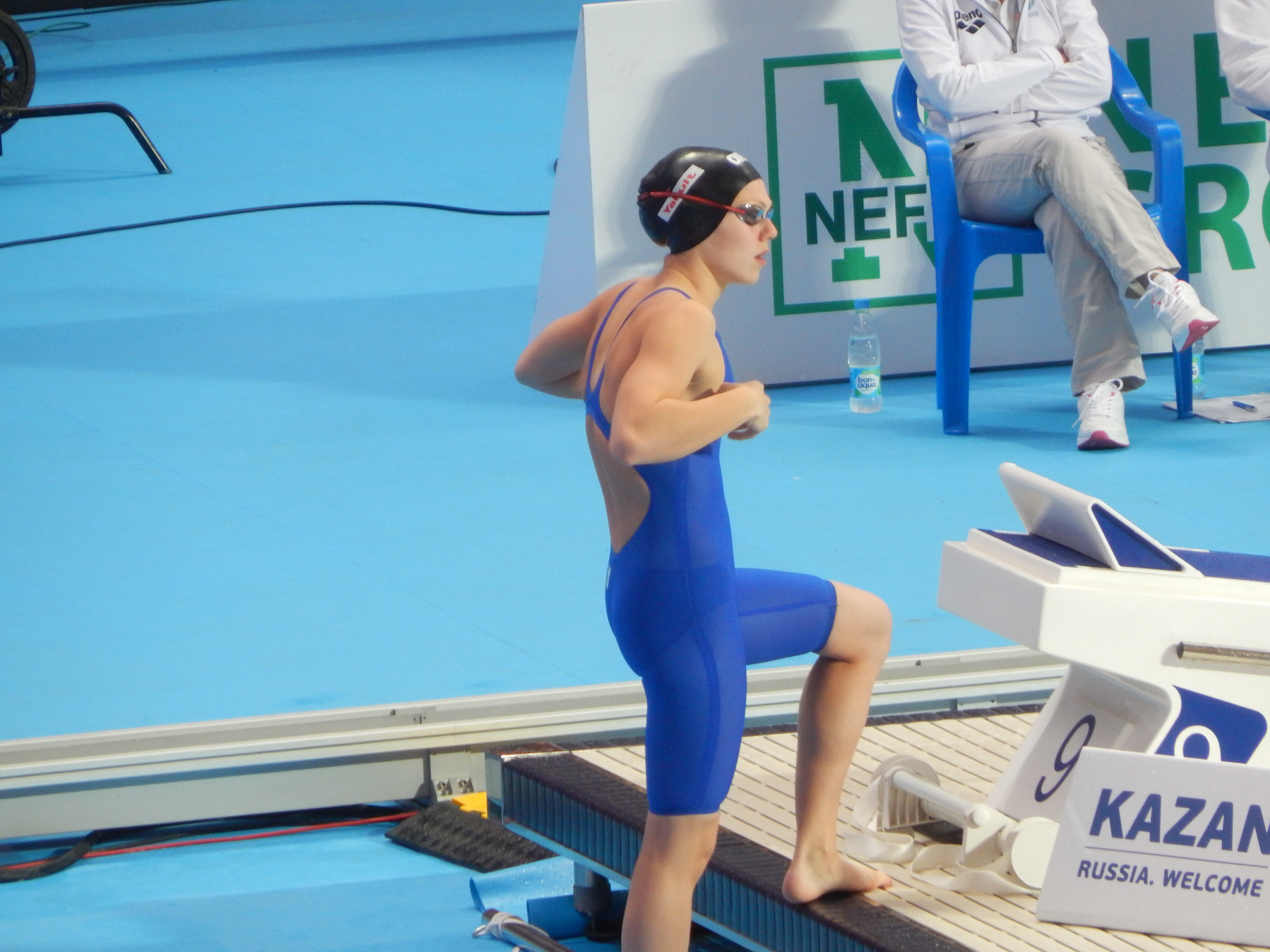
- Kazan 2015

Personal information
- National team: Russia
- Born: 5 April 1999 (age 27) Penza, Penza Oblast, Russia
- Height: 1.66 m (5 ft 5 in)
- Weight: 51 kg (112 lb; 8.0 st)

Sport
- Sport: Swimming
- Strokes: Breaststroke
- College team: University of Louisville
Medal record
Women's swimming
Representing Russia
European Championships (SC)
Silver medal – second place	2015 Netanya	200 m breaststroke
European Games
Gold medal – first place	2015 Baku	50 m breaststroke
Gold medal – first place	2015 Baku	100 m breaststroke
Gold medal – first place	2015 Baku	200 m breaststroke
Gold medal – first place	2015 Baku	4×100 m medley
World Junior Championships
Gold medal – first place	2015 Singapore	4×100 m medley
Silver medal – second place	2015 Singapore	200 m breaststroke

Maria Astashkina (Russian: Мария Асташкина), (born 5 April 1999 in Penza, Russia) is a Russian swimmer. She won 4 gold medals in (200 m, 100 m, 50m breaststroke and 4 × 100 m medley) at the 2015 European Games.

== Career ==
In 2014, Astashkina competed at the 2014 European Junior Championships winning 4 gold medals in (200 m, 100 m, 50m breaststroke and 4 × 100 m medley), that same year, she competed in seniors at the 2014 European Championships and at the 2014 FINA World Swimming Championships (25 m) in Doha, Qatar where she qualified for the finals in 200 m breaststroke finishing in 6th place and with Team Russia finishing 5th in 4 × 100 m women's medley.

In June 2015, 16 year old Astashkina was selected to compete at the inaugural 2015 European Games in Baku, where she won four gold medals, in (200m, 100 m, 50m breaststroke), in 4 × 100 m medley (with Arina Openysheva, Polina Egorova and Maria Kameneva broke a new junior world record touching in at 4:03.22). Astashkina also broke a junior meet record in 200m breaststroke at the Games. On August 2–9, Astashkina competed in seniors at the 2015 World Championships in Kazan, however she did not reach the semifinals after losing in her preliminary heats.

On August 25–30, Astashkina then competed at the 2015 World Junior Swimming Championships in Singapore, she won a silver medal in individual women's 200 m breaststroke behind Turkey's Viktoriya Zeynep Gunes, she finished 4th in 100 m breaststroke, 6th in 50 m breaststroke and won gold with the Russian Team in women's 4 × 100 m medley.

In April 2016, Astashkina competed at the National Championships. She won a bronze medal in 200 m breastroke but she did not comply required time to qualify at the Olympics.
