= Handa Faldo Cambodian Classic =

Golf tournament on the Asian Tour

Tournament information
- Location: Siem Reap, Cambodia
- Established: 2012
- Course: Angkor Golf Resort
- Par: 72
- Length: 7,279 yards (6,656 m)
- Tour: Asian Tour
- Format: Stroke play
- Prize fund: US$300,000
- Month played: March
- Final year: 2012

Tournament record score
- Aggregate: 273 David Lipsky (2012); 273 Elmer Salvador (2012)
- To par: −15 as above

Final champion
- (United States) David Lipsky

Location map
- Location in Cambodia

The Handa Faldo Cambodian Classic was a golf tournament on the Asian Tour. It was played for in March 2012 at the Angkor Golf Resort in Siem Reap, Cambodia. Title sponsors were Dr. Haruhisa Handa of the International Sports Promotion Society and golfer Nick Faldo. The purse was US$300,000. American David Lipsky won the event in a playoff with Elmer Salvador.

== Winners ==
Year	Winner	Score	To par	Margin of victory	Runner-up
2012	(United States) David Lipsky	273	−15	Playoff	(Philippines) Elmer Salvador
