= 2014 European Junior Swimming Championships =

Water sport competitions

The 2014 European Junior Swimming Championships were held from 9–13 July 2014 in Dordrecht, Netherlands. The Championships were organized by LEN, the European Swimming League, and were held in a 50-meter pool. Per LEN rules, competitors have age 15 or 16 for girls and 17 or 18 for boys. Because the championships were the first major junior meet after FINA began tracking junior world records in swimming, a number of records were broken at the meet.

== Results ==
=== Boys ===
Games	Gold		Silver		Bronze	
50 m freestyle	Evgeny Sedov; Russia	22.16	Jan Hołub; Poland	22.45	Fotios Mylonas; Greece	22.56
100 m freestyle	Jan Hołub; Poland	49.49	Damian Wierling; Germany	49.57	Péter Holoda; Hungary	49.74
200 m freestyle	Kyle Stolk; Netherlands	1:48.46	Nicolangelo Di Fabio; Italy	1:48.80	Anton Skudnov; Russia	1:49.23
400 m freestyle	Wojciech Wojdak; Poland	3:49.21	Henrik Christiansen; Norway	3:49.60 NR	Mykhailo Romanchuk; Ukraine	3:52.19
800 m freestyle	Mykhailo Romanchuk; Ukraine	7:54.81 CR	Wojciech Wojdak; Poland	7:57.48	Henrik Christiansen; Norway	7:58.72
1500 m freestyle	Daniel Jervis; Great Britain	15:07.12	Mykhailo Romanchuk; Ukraine	15:07.24	Henrik Christiansen; Norway	15:09.48
50 m backstroke	Simone Sabbioni; Italy	25.22 WJR CR	Apostolos Christou; Greece	25.33	Jānis Šaltāns; Latvia	25.54
100 m backstroke	Apostolos Christou; Greece	54.03 WJR CR	Simone Sabbioni; Italy	54.25	Evgeny Rylov; Russia	54.46
200 m backstroke	Luke Greenbank; Great Britain	1:58.05	Apostolos Christou; Greece	1:59.93	Emanuel Turchi; Italy	2:00.57
50 m breaststroke	Stanislau Pazdzeyeu; Belarus	28.34	Krzysztof Tokarski; Poland	28.57	Anton Chupkov; Russia	28.60
100 m breaststroke	Max Pilger; Germany	1:01.97	Itay Goldfaden; Israel	1:02.09	Anton Chupkov; Russia	1:02.22
200 m breaststroke	Max Pilger; Germany	2:12.45	Anton Chupkov; Russia	2:13.27	Dávid Horváth; Hungary	2:13.47
50 m butterfly	Evgeny Sedov; Russia	23.83	Aleksandr Sadovnikov; Russia	24.03	Péter Holoda; Hungary	24.45
100 m butterfly	Aleksandr Sadovnikov; Russia	53.52	Nils Liess; Switzerland	53,59	Vladislav Kozlov; Russia	53.83
200 m butterfly	Tamás Kenderesi; Hungary	1:56.74	Nils Liess; Switzerland	1:58.51	Alexander Kunert; Germany	1:58.92
200 m individual medley	Duncan Scott; Great Britain	2:01.57	Norbert Szabó; Hungary	2:02.00	Benjámin Grátz; Hungary	2:02.21
400 m individual medley	Benjámin Grátz; Hungary	4:19.68	Norbert Szabó; Hungary	4:23.77	Joan Casanovas Skoubo; Spain	4:24.09
4x100 m freestyle	Great Britain; Duncan Scott 50.14; Martyn Walton 50.41; Miles Munro 49.56; Jack Smith 49.67	3:19.78	Germany; Damian Wierling 50.03; Marek Ulrich 50.94; Konstantin Walter 50.98; Alexander Kunert 50.14	3:22.09	Italy; Alessandro Bori 50.86; Francesco Peron 50.62; Raffaele Tavoletta 50.75; Nicolangelo Di Fabio 50.07	3:22.30
4x200 m freestyle	Germany; Henning Muehlleitner 1:51.14; Konstantin Walter 1:51.16; Damian Wierling 1:49.29; Alexander Kunert 1:49.66	7:21.25	Italy; Nicolangelo Di Fabio 1:49.45; Mattia Zuin 1:51.06; Alessio Occhipinti 1:51.58; Francesco Peron 1:50.53	7:22.62	Great Britain; Martyn Walton 1:50.84; Daniel Jervis 1:51.46; Jack Smith 1:52.52; Duncan Scott 1:48.31	7:23.13
4x100 m medley	Russia; Evgeny Rylov 54.44; Anton Chupkov 1:00.86; Aleksandr Sadovnikov 53.43; Filipp Shopin 50.52	3.39.25	Italy; Simone Sabbioni 54.43; Marco Paganelli 1:03.26; Giacomo Carini 53.73; Alessandro Bori 49.64	3:41.06	Germany; Marek Ulrich 55.62; Max Pilger 1:01.64; Tesch Johannes 54.81; Damian Wierling 49.13	3:41.20

=== Girls ===
Games	Gold		Silver		Bronze	
50 m freestyle	Daria S. Ustinova; Russia	25.39	Maria Kameneva; Russia	25.57	Valerie van Roon; Netherlands	25.69
100 m freestyle	Arina Openysheva; Russia	54.78 =CR	Daria S. Ustinova; Russia	55.30	Rachele Ceracchi; Italy	56.12
200 m freestyle	Arina Openysheva; Russia	2:00.18	Daria Mullakaeva; Russia	2:00.60	Leonie Kullmann; Germany	2:01.02
400 m freestyle	Arina Openysheva; Russia	4:12.76	Melinda Novoszáth; Hungary	4:13.53	Daria Mullakaeva; Russia	4:15.31
800 m freestyle	Simona Quadarella; Italy	8:40.21	Holly Hibbott; Great Britain	8:41.41	Linda Caponi; Italy	8:41.72
1500 m freestyle	Simona Quadarella; Italy	16:30.37	Laura Rodríguez; Spain	16:34.04	Melinda Novoszáth; Hungary	16:42.65
50 m backstroke	Daria Ustinova; Russia	28.18 CR	Maria Kameneva; Russia	28.48	Ema Sarar; Croatia	29.18
100 m backstroke	Daria Ustinova; Russia	1:00.37	Ekaterina Tomashevskaya; Russia	1:01.53	Laura Riedemann; Germany	1:02.34
200 m backstroke	Daria Ustinova; Russia	2:09.21 CR	África Zamorano; Spain	2:11.70	Irina Prikhodko; Russia	2:12.42
50 m breaststroke	Maria Astashkina; Russia	31.90	Eleonora Clerici; Italy	32.02	Sophie Hansson; Sweden	31.65
100 m breaststroke	Maria Astashkina; Russia	1:07.82	Marlene Hüther; Germany	1:09.19	Daria Chikunova; Russia	1:09.33
200 m breaststroke	Maria Astashkina; Russia	2:26.61	Daria Chikunova; Russia	2:27.78	Emma Cain; Great Britain	2:29.17
50 m butterfly	Barbora Mišendová; Slovakia	26.84	Szonja Szokol; Hungary	27.02	Maria Kameneva; Russia	27.03
100 m butterfly	Lisa Höpink; Germany	59.93	Amelia Clynes; Great Britain	59.96	Barbora Mišendová; Slovakia	1:00.00
200 m butterfly	Adél Juhász; Hungary	2:10.93	Carmen Balbuena; Spain	2:11.24	Amelia Clynes; Great Britain	2:11.46
200 m individual medley	África Zamorano; Spain	2:13.80 CR	Georgia Coates; Great Britain	2:14.72	Lisa Katharina Hoepnik; Germany	2:14.97
400 m individual medley	África Zamorano; Spain	4:41.96	Rosie Rudin; Great Britain	4:43.56	Georgia Coates; Great Britain	4:44.60
4x100 m freestyle	Russia; Arina Openysheva 54.98; Daria Mullakaeva 56.35; Maria Kudelkina 56.22; Daria S. Ustinova 54.64	3:42.19 CR	Germany; Nele Klein 57.15; Leonie Kullmann 56.38; Laura Reidemann 57.49; Katrin Gottwald 56.29	3:47.31	Italy; Alessia Ruggi 57.81; Sofia Iurasek 56.87; Federica Sarti Cipriani 57.32; Rachele Ceracchi 56.23	3:48.23
4x200 m freestyle	Russia; Arina Openysheva 2:00.55; Daria Mullakaeva 1:59.05; Daria Ustinova 2:02.47; Daria S. Ustinova 2:01.61	8:03.68	Germany; Alina Jungklaus 2:02.14; Josephine Tesch 2:03.27; Marlene Hüther 2:01.45; Leonie Kullmann 2:00.20	8:07.06	Spain; Sandra Pallarés 2:02.66; Elisa Sánchez 2:02.08; Laura Rodríguez 2:03.34; Africa Zamorano 2:00.21	8:08.29
4x100 m medley	Russia; Daria Ustinova 1:00.25 CR; Maria Astashkina 1:07.60; Alexandra Chesnokova 1:00.89; Arina Openysheva 56.90	4:05.64	Germany; Laura Reidemann 1:02.19; Marlene Hüther 1:09.47; Lisa Höpink 59.86; Nele Klein 56.07	4:07.59	Italy; Federica Sarti Cipriani 1:04.52; Eleonora Clerici 1:09.59; Sara Gyertyanffy 1:00.61; Rachele Ceracchi 55.60	4:10.32

=== Mixed Events ===
Games	Gold		Silver		Bronze	
4x100 m freestyle	Russia; Filipp Shopin 50.68; Roman Domachuk 50.54; Daria S. Ustinova 54.56; Arina Openysheva 55.19	3:30.97	Germany; Damian Wierling 50.36; Nele Klein 56.20; Leonie Kullmann 56.36; Alexander Kunert 49.51	3:32.43	Netherlands; Kyle Stolk 50.36; Tessa Vermeulen 56.59; Valerie van Roon 56.69; Laurent Bams 50.19	3:33.83
4x100 m medley	Russia; Daria Ustinova 1:00.46; Anton Chupkov 1:00.91; Aleksandr Savdovnikov 53.01; Daria S. Ustinova 54.67	3:49.05 CR	Germany; Laura Riedemann 1:02.27; Max Pilger 1:01.30; Lisa Höpink 59.96; Damian Wierling 49.18	3:52.71	Italy; Simone Sabbioni 54.56; Eleonora Clerici 1:10.45; Giacomo Carini 53.72; Rachele Ceracchi 55.78	3:54.51

== Medal table ==
* Host nation (Netherlands)

Rank	Nation	Gold	Silver	Bronze	Total
1	Russia	19	8	9	36
2	Germany	4	8	5	17
3	Great Britain	4	4	4	12
4	Italy	3	5	7	15
5	Hungary	3	4	5	12
6	Spain	2	3	2	7
7	Poland	2	3	0	5
8	Greece	1	2	1	4
9	Ukraine	1	1	1	3
10	Netherlands*	1	0	2	3
11	Slovakia	1	0	1	2
12	Belarus	1	0	0	1
13	Switzerland	0	2	0	2
14	Norway	0	1	2	3
15	Israel	0	1	0	1
16	Croatia	0	0	1	1
16	Latvia	0	0	1	1
16	Sweden	0	0	1	1
Totals (18 entries)		42	42	42	126

== Participating countries ==
42 countries will take part in 2014 European Junior Swimming Championships with total of 511 swimmers.
