= David Lipsky (golfer) =

American professional golfer (born 1988)

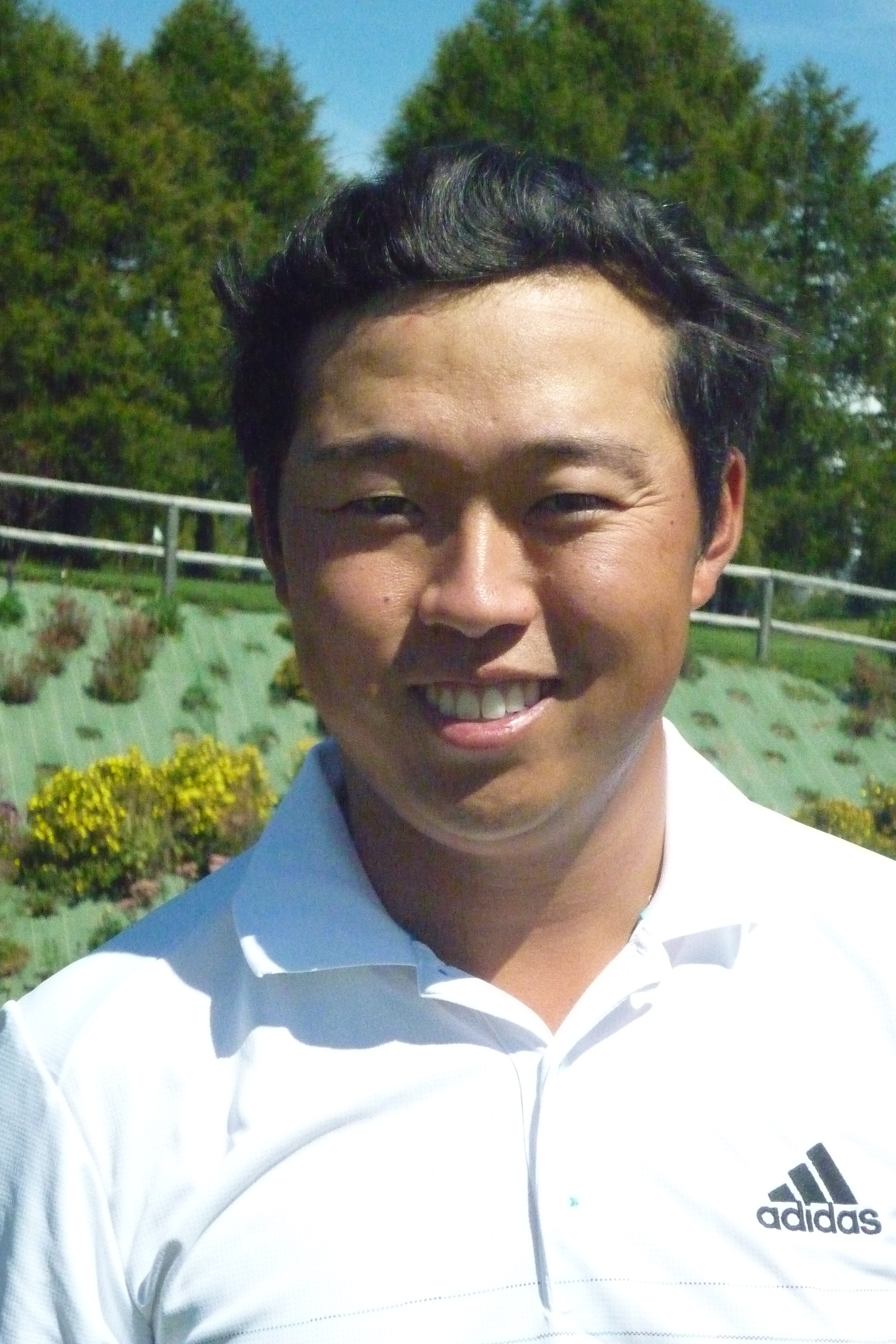
- Lipsky at the 2014 Omega European Masters

Personal information
- Nationality: United States
- Born: July 14, 1988 (age 38) Los Angeles, California, U.S.
- Height: 5 ft 10 in (1.78 m)
- Weight: 160 lb (73 kg; 11 st)

Career
- Sport: Golf
- College: Northwestern University
- Turned professional: 2011
- Current tour: PGA Tour
- Former tours: European Tour; Asian Tour; Korn Ferry Tour
- Professional wins: 4
- Highest ranking: 88 (March 22, 2026) (as of October 25, 2026)

Number of wins by tour
- European Tour: 2
- Asian Tour: 2
- Sunshine Tour: 1
- Korn Ferry Tour: 1

Best results in major championships
- Masters Tournament: DNP
- PGA Championship: T71: 2019
- U.S. Open: DNP
- The Open Championship: T58: 2015

Achievements and awards
- Asian Tour Order of Merit winner: 2014

David Lipsky (born July 14, 1988) is an American professional golfer. Lipsky played college golf at Northwestern University where he was an All-American and won the 2010 Big Ten individual championship. Lipsky turned professional after graduating in 2011. He joined the Asian Tour in 2012 and won the Handa Faldo Cambodian Classic in his third start on the tour. In 2014 he won the Omega European Masters, a European Tour event co-sanctioned by the Asian Tour; he went on to win the 2014 Asian Tour Order of Merit. Since that victory, he has competed predominantly on the European Tour and won for the second time at the Alfred Dunhill Championship in 2018. He has also played on the second-tier Korn Ferry Tour in the United States, winning once.

== Early life ==
Lipsky is Korean and Jewish, and was born in Los Angeles, California, to Aaron Lipsky and Yon Suk Lipsky, who is from Korea. His parents introduced him to golf when he was 10 years old.

He lived in La Cañada Flintridge, California, and in high school at La Cañada High School, at which he was a 4.0 student, Lipsky won the 2003 Ashworth Postseason at Mission Hills, the 2004 Junior Tour Championship played at PGA West, and the Rio Hondo High School League Tournament in 2004 and 2005. He was named Los Angeles all-Southern Section in 2004–06, MVP of the Rio Hondo League in 2004 and 2005, and First-team all-Los Angeles Area in 2005, while averaging a score of 36 in his last two seasons in high school. He graduated in 2006.

== Amateur career ==
Lipsky played college golf at Northwestern University, which he attended on a partial scholarship and at which he majored in political science and history. He also caddied throughout college. In addition, he was also a member of the Rho chapter of Beta Theta Pi.

In 2007–08, he had a number one finish with a 139 at the Notre Dame Invitational, and won the Jacksonville Dual Match with a 68. Lipsky had a 74.47 stroke average. In 2008–09, he was All-Big Ten second-team, Golf Coaches Association of America (GCAA) PING All-Region, and Academic All-Big Ten.

In 2009–10 Lipsky won the 2010 Big Ten individual championship with a 72-hole total of 3-under 281. He was All-Big Ten first-team, GCAA PING All-Midwest Region, and All-Academic Big Ten. He had a 71.88 stroke average, the sixth-best season average in school history.

In 2010–11, at the UNCG Bridgestone Golf Collegiate he scored a 68-68-66 for a 14-under-par 202, tying Luke Donald's 54-hole tournament score school record. Lipsky was honored as All-American, GCAA PING All-America honorable mention, All-Big Ten first team, GCAA PING All-Region, Big Ten All-Championships Team, and Academic All-Big Ten. He had a 72.02 stroke average in the regular season, seventh-best in school season history, and ended with a career 72.97 stroke average, the fourth-best in school history behind Luke Donald, Tom Johnson, and Jess Daley. In 2011, Lipsky graduated.

== Professional career ==
In 2011, Lipsky turned professional. He was medalist at Asian Tour Qualifying School in January 2012. He won his third start on the tour, the 2012 Handa Faldo Cambodian Classic (earning $47,550 and a winner's exemption on the tour until the end of 2014), and finished 11th on the tour's Order of Merit as a rookie. He played on the Web.com Tour in 2013.

In May 2014, he came in second by one stroke to Chile's Felipe Aguilar in The Championship at Laguna National, which was jointly sanctioned by the Asian Tour and European Tour. Lipsky won the Omega European Masters (earning a career-best €383,330 ($497,000)) and finished the Asian Tour season leading the Order of Merit, which also earned him entry into his first major (2015 Open Championship) and first WGC event (2015 WGC-Cadillac Championship) and a European Tour exemption through 2016. He ended the year in the top 150 in world rankings.

On December 16, 2018, Lipsky won the Alfred Dunhill Championship at Leopard Creek Country Club in South Africa. This event was co-sanctioned by the European Tour and the Sunshine Tour.

== Amateur wins ==
- 2010 Big Ten Championship

== Professional wins (4) ==
=== European Tour wins (2) ===
No.	Date	Tournament	Winning score	Margin of victory	Runner-up
1	Sep 7, 2014	Omega European Masters^{1}	−18 (67-64-66-65=262)	Playoff	(England) Graeme Storm
2	Dec 16, 2018 (2019 season)	Alfred Dunhill Championship^{2}	−14 (70-66-70-68=274)	2 strokes	(Scotland) David Drysdale

^{1}Co-sanctioned by the Asian Tour
^{2}Co-sanctioned by the Sunshine Tour

European Tour playoff record (1–0)

No.	Year	Tournament	Opponent	Result
1	2014	Omega European Masters	(England) Graeme Storm	Won with par on first extra hole

=== Asian Tour wins (2) ===
No.	Date	Tournament	Winning score	Margin of victory	Runner-up
1	Mar 17, 2012	Handa Faldo Cambodian Classic	−15 (73-68-67-65=273)	Playoff	(Philippines) Elmer Salvador
2	Sep 7, 2014	Omega European Masters^{1}	−18 (67-64-66-65=262)	Playoff	(England) Graeme Storm

^{1}Co-sanctioned by the European Tour

Asian Tour playoff record (2–0)

No.	Year	Tournament	Opponent	Result
1	2012	Handa Faldo Cambodian Classic	(Philippines) Elmer Salvador	Won with birdie on first extra hole
2	2014	Omega European Masters	(England) Graeme Storm	Won with par on first extra hole

=== Korn Ferry Tour wins (1) ===
No.	Date	Tournament	Winning score	Margin of victory	Runner-up
1	Jul 12, 2020	TPC San Antonio Challenge	−25 (69-66-62-66=263)	4 strokes	(Canada) Taylor Pendrith

Korn Ferry Tour playoff record (0–1)

No.	Year	Tournament	Opponent	Result
1	2021	Emerald Coast Classic	(Germany) Stephan Jäger	Lost to par on first extra hole

== Results in major championships ==
Tournament	2015	2016	2017	2018
Masters Tournament				
U.S. Open				
The Open Championship	T58		CUT	
PGA Championship				

Tournament	2019	2020	2021	2022	2023	2024	2025	2026
Masters Tournament								
PGA Championship	T71							CUT
U.S. Open								
The Open Championship	CUT	NT						

Did not play

CUT = missed the half-way cut
"T" indicates a tie for a place
NT = no tournament due to COVID-19 pandemic

== Results in The Players Championship ==
Tournament	2023	2024	2025
The Players Championship	CUT	T42	CUT

CUT = missed the half-way cut
"T" = tied

== Results in World Golf Championships ==
Results not in chronological order before 2015.

Tournament	2012	2013	2014	2015	2016	2017	2018	2019	2020	2021
Championship				T62		T63	T48	T10		T48
Match Play									NT^{1}	
Invitational				73						
Champions	T72		T56			T58			NT^{1}	NT^{1}

^{1}Cancelled due to COVID-19 pandemic

Top 10
Did not play

NT = no tournament
"T" = tied

== See also ==
- 2021 Korn Ferry Tour Finals graduates
- List of Jewish golfers
