= Emerald Coast Classic (Korn Ferry Tour) =

Golf tournament

Tournament information
- Location: Miramar Beach, Florida
- Established: 2021
- Courses: Sandestin Golf and Beach Resort (Raven Golf Club)
- Par: 70
- Length: 6,891 yards (6,301 m)
- Tour: Korn Ferry Tour
- Format: Stroke play
- Prize fund: US$600,000
- Month played: April
- Final year: 2021

Tournament record score
- Aggregate: 266 Stephan Jäger (2021); 266 David Lipsky (2021)
- To par: −14 as above

Final champion
- (Germany) Stephan Jäger

Location map
- Location in the United States Location in Florida

The Emerald Coast Classic at Sandestin is a golf tournament on the Korn Ferry Tour. It was first played in April 2021 at Raven Golf Club at Sandestin Golf and Beach Resort near Miramar Beach, Florida.

== Winners ==
Year	Winner	Score	To par	Margin of victory	Runner-up
2021	(Germany) Stephan Jäger	266	−14	Playoff	(United States) David Lipsky
