= Lisa Höpink =

German swimmer (born 1998)

Personal information
- Born: 17 November 1998 (age 27)
- Height: 175 cm (5 ft 9 in)
- Weight: 68 kg (150 lb)

Sport
- Sport: Swimming
- Strokes: Butterfly, freestyle
- Club: Neckarsulmer SU
Medal record
Representing Germany
European Junior Swimming Championships
Gold medal – first place	2014 Dordrecht	100 m butterfly
Silver medal – second place	2014 Dordrecht	4 x 100 m medley
Silver medal – second place	2014 Dordrecht	4 x 100 m mixed medley
Summer Universiade
Silver medal – second place	2019 Naples	100 m freestyle
Bronze medal – third place	2019 Naples	100 m butterfly

Lisa Höpink (born 17 November 1998) is a German swimmer, who competed in the 4 × 100 metre freestyle relay and 4 × 100 metre medley relay events at the 2020 Summer Olympics. She won two medals at the 2019 Summer Universiade, and three medals at the 2014 European Junior Swimming Championships.

== Career ==
Höpink is a former member of Essen Swimming Club. In 2022, she transferred to Neckarsulmer SU.

At the age of 14, Höpink won her national age group 50 and 100 metres butterfly events, as well as the 200 and 400 metres individual medley events. In 2012, she competed in the 4 x 50 metre butterfly event at the regional Ruhr Olympiad, and Essen Swimming Club won the event. She was named the North Rhine-Westphalia state Jugendschwimmerin des Jahres (young swimmer of the year) in 2013 and 2014. At the 2014 European Junior Swimming Championships, Höpink won the 100 metre butterfly event, came second in the women's 4 x 100 metre medley race, and second in the 4 x 100 metre mixed medley event. She won the most medals of any German athlete at the Championships.

Höpink competed at the 2015 European Short Course Swimming Championships, finishing eighth in the 200 metre butterfly event. She competed at the 2016 European Aquatics Championships in the 50 metre, 100 metre and 200 metre butterfly events. Höpink attempted to qualify for the 200 metre butterfly and freestyle events at the 2016 Summer Olympics. Later in 2016, she competed at the FINA World Swimming Championships (25 m). At the 2019 Summer Universiade in Naples, Italy, Höpink won a bronze medal in the 100 metre butterfly event, and a silver medal in the 100 metre freestyle event. She also competed in the 50 metre freestyle and the 50 and 200 metre butterfly events. In the same year, she won the 50 metres freestyle event at the German National Short Course Championships, and came third in the mixed relay. She also competed at the 2019 European Short Course Swimming Championships, finishing sixth in the 4 x 50 metre freestyle event and ninth in the 100 metre butterfly race.

In April 2021, Höpink qualified for the 4 × 100 metre medley relay event at the delayed 2020 Summer Olympics. She competed in the butterfly leg of the event. She also qualified for the 4 × 100 metre freestyle relay event at the 2020 Games, Höpink won the 100 metre butterfly event at the German Olympic trials, but was outside of the Olympic qualifying time. She also came second in the 100 metre freestyle event at the German Olympic Trials, but was again slower than the Olympic qualifying time, It was Höpink's first appearance at an Olympic Games. In the 4 × 100 metre freestyle relay, Germany came seventh in their heat, and in the 4 × 100 metre medley relay, they finished sixth in their heat.

At the 2022 German Swimming Championships, Höpink finished third in the 100 metres freestyle event.

== Personal life ==
Höpink is from Herne, Germany, and attended Helmholtz-Gymnasium Heidelberg. She later studied business psychology at Ruhr University Bochum. In 2018, Höpink became a certified swimming coach. In 2022, she moved to Untereisesheim.
