= Stephan Jäger =

German professional golfer (born 1989)

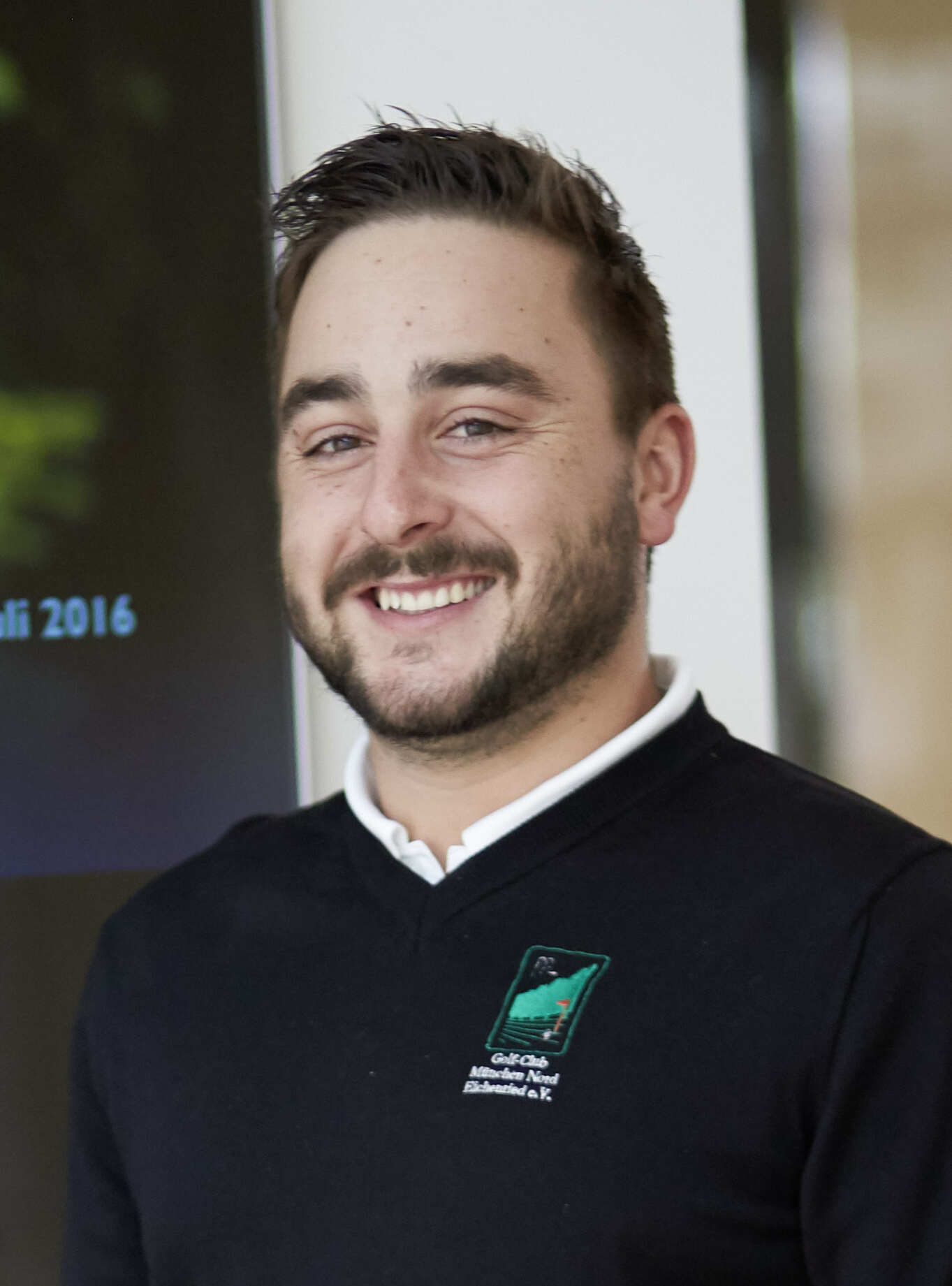
- Jäger in 2017

Personal information
- Full name: Stephan Patrick Jäger
- Nickname: Jaegerbomb
- Nationality: Germany
- Born: 30 May 1989 (age 37) Munich, West Germany
- Height: 5 ft 9 in (175 cm)
- Weight: 170 lb (77 kg)

Career
- Sport: Golf
- College: University of Tennessee-Chattanooga
- Turned professional: 2012
- Current tour: PGA Tour
- Former tours: Korn Ferry Tour; PGA Tour Latinoamérica
- Professional wins: 7
- Highest ranking: 38 (12 May 2024) (as of 25 October 2026)

Number of wins by tour
- PGA Tour: 1
- Korn Ferry Tour: 6 (Tied-2nd all-time)

Best results in major championships
- Masters Tournament: T52: 2025
- PGA Championship: T18: 2026
- U.S. Open: T21: 2024
- The Open Championship: CUT: 2024, 2025

Achievements and awards
- Korn Ferry Tour regular season points list winner: 2020–21
- Korn Ferry Tour Player of the Year: 2020–21

Stephan Patrick Jäger (/ˈstiːvən ˈjeɪɡər/ STEEV-ən YAY-gər; born 30 May 1989), also spelled as Stephan Jaeger, is a German professional golfer who plays on the PGA Tour. He has won six tournaments on the second tier Korn Ferry Tour in the United States. He won his first PGA Tour event at the 2024 Texas Children's Houston Open.

== Amateur career ==
Jäger attended the Baylor School in Chattanooga, Tennessee and played collegiate golf at University of Tennessee-Chattanooga. He turned professional in 2012.

== Professional career ==
Jäger qualified for the 2015 U.S. Open where he shot 74–80 to miss the cut.

At the 2016 Ellie Mae Classic, Jäger shot a 12-under par 58 in the first round and followed it up with rounds of 65-64-63 to claim his first Web.com Tour victory. He set the 72-hole aggregate record with his 250 and tied the to-par record, at 30 under par, and won by 7 strokes over Rhein Gibson. He also set the 36-hole and 54-hole records. Despite the win, Jäger finished 28th on the regular season money list, three spots short of a guaranteed PGA Tour card.

Hole	10	11	12	13	14	15	16	17	18	Out	1	2	3	4	5	6	7	8	9	In	Total
Par	4	4	3	4	4	5	3	4	4	35	4	3	5	3	4	3	4	4	5	35	70
Score	4	3	3	3	3	4	2	3	4	29	3	2	5	2	3	2	4	4	4	29	58

In 2017, Jäger won twice on the Web.com Tour, finishing fifth on the regular-season money list and earning a PGA Tour card for the 2017–18 season. In May 2018, ranked 161st in the FedEx Cup and having failed to qualify for The Players Championship, Jäger played in and won the Web.com Tour's Knoxville Open, his fourth victory on that tour. After failing to finish in either the top 125 of the FedEx Cup or the Web.com Tour's top 25, Jäger regained his PGA Tour card through the Web.com Tour Finals.

Back on the Korn Ferry Tour in 2020, Jäger picked up his fifth title on the tour at the Albertsons Boise Open. The win helped gain him exemption into the 2020 U.S. Open as one of the leading points scorers in the final three Championship Series events, and into four alternate events on the PGA Tour in 2021 by virtue of being in the top ten of the tour standings after the Korn Ferry Tour Championship. He won the Korn Ferry Tour Player of the Year award for the 2020–21 season.

During the 2021–22 PGA Tour season, Jäger finished in the top 10 twice; T6 at the Wells Fargo Championship and solo 5th at the Rocket Mortgage Classic.

On 31 March 2024, Jäger claimed his first PGA Tour win at the Texas Children's Houston Open after Scottie Scheffler missed a birdie attempt that would have forced a playoff.

== Professional wins (7) ==
=== PGA Tour wins (1) ===
No.	Date	Tournament	Winning score	Margin of victory	Runners-up
1	31 Mar 2024	Texas Children's Houston Open	−12 (69-66-66-67=268)	1 stroke	(Belgium) Thomas Detry, (United States) Tony Finau, (United States) Taylor Moore, (United States) Scottie Scheffler, (Argentina) Alejandro Tosti

=== Korn Ferry Tour wins (6) ===
Legend
Championship Series (1)
Other Korn Ferry Tour (5)

No.	Date	Tournament	Winning score	Margin of victory	Runner(s)-up
1	31 Jul 2016	Ellie Mae Classic	−30 (58-65-64-63=250)	7 strokes	(Australia) Rhein Gibson
2	21 May 2017	BMW Charity Pro-Am	−19 (64-66-65=195) (Note: Shortened to 54 holes due to weather.)	1 stroke	(United States) Tyler Duncan, (United States) Andrew Yun, (China) Zhang Xinjun
3	11 Jun 2017	Rust-Oleum Championship	−14 (68-67-68-71=274)	2 strokes	(United States) Ted Potter Jr.
4	13 May 2018	Knoxville Open	−16 (68-72-64-64=268)	3 strokes	(South Korea) Im Sung-jae
5	16 Aug 2020	Albertsons Boise Open	−22 (65-64-65-68=262)	2 strokes	(United States) Dan McCarthy, (United States) Brandon Wu
6	4 Apr 2021	Emerald Coast Classic	−14 (67-67-66-66=266)	Playoff	(United States) David Lipsky

Korn Ferry Tour playoff record (1–1)

No.	Year	Tournament	Opponent	Result
1	2021	Emerald Coast Classic	(United States) David Lipsky	Won with par on first extra hole
2	2021	Rex Hospital Open	(Chile) Mito Pereira	Lost to birdie on first extra hole

== Results in major championships ==
Results not in chronological order in 2020.

Tournament	2015	2016	2017	2018
Masters Tournament				
U.S. Open	CUT		T60	
The Open Championship				
PGA Championship				

Tournament	2019	2020	2021	2022	2023	2024	2025	2026
Masters Tournament						CUT	T52	
PGA Championship					T50	76	70	T18
U.S. Open		T34				T21	CUT	
The Open Championship		NT				CUT	CUT	

Did not play

CUT = missed the half-way cut
"T" = tied for place
NT = no tournament due to COVID-19 pandemic

=== Summary ===
Tournament	Wins	2nd	3rd	Top-5	Top-10	Top-25	Events	Cuts made
Masters Tournament	0	0	0	0	0	0	2	1
PGA Championship	0	0	0	0	0	1	4	4
U.S. Open	0	0	0	0	0	1	5	3
The Open Championship	0	0	0	0	0	0	2	0
Totals	0	0	0	0	0	2	13	8

- Most consecutive cuts made – 3 (2017 U.S. Open – 2023 PGA Championship)

== Results in The Players Championship ==
Tournament	2022	2023	2024	2025	2026
The Players Championship	CUT	T44	CUT	T20	T62

CUT = missed the halfway cut
"T" indicates a tie for a place

== Team appearances ==
Amateur

- European Boys' Team Championship (representing Germany): 2006
- European Amateur Team Championship (representing Germany): 2011

Professional

- World Cup (representing Germany): 2016

== See also ==
- 2017 Web.com Tour Finals graduates
- 2018 Web.com Tour Finals graduates
- 2021 Korn Ferry Tour Finals graduates
- List of golfers with most Korn Ferry Tour wins
- Lowest rounds of golf
