= 2010 World Judo Championships – Men's 100 kg =

Judo competition

Judo Men's 100 kg at the 2010 World Judo Championships
- Venue: Yoyogi National Gymnasium
- Location: Tokyo, Japan
- Date: 9 September 2010
- Competitors: 58 from 44 nations

Medalists
gold medal	Takamasa Anai (1st title)	Japan
silver medal	Henk Grol	Netherlands
bronze medal	Oreidis Despaigne	Cuba
bronze medal	Thierry Fabre	France

Competition at external databases
- Links: IJF • JudoInside

The Men's -100 kg competition at the 2010 World Judo Championships was held at 9 September at the Yoyogi National Gymnasium in Tokyo, Japan. 58 competitors contested for the medals, being split in 4 Pools where the winner advanced to the medal round.

== Pool A ==
First Round
(Japan) Takamasa Anai	110
(Lithuania) Marius Labalaukis	000
(Argentina) Cristian Schmidt	000
(Israel) Ariel Ze'evi	010
(Czech Republic) Lukas Krpalek	022
(Hungary) Balint Farkas	000
(Kyrgyzstan) Aleksei Taskin	001
(United Kingdom) James Austin	100
(Belarus) Yauhen Biadulin	002
(Latvia) Jevgenijs Borodavko	011
(Chinese Taipei) Hong-Yen Chang	000
(France) Thierry Fabre	100
(Romania) Daniel Brata	100
(Thailand) Banpot Thonglim	000

Quarterfinals
(Japan) Takamasa Anai	100
(Israel) Ariel Ze'evi	000
(Czech Republic) Lukas Krpalek	001
(United Kingdom) James Austin	000
(Latvia) Jevgenijs Borodavko	011
(Slovakia) Zoltan Palkovacs	000
(France) Thierry Fabre	100
(Romania) Daniel Brata	000

Semifinals
(Japan) Takamasa Anai	010
(Czech Republic) Lukas Krpalek	000
(Latvia) Jevgenijs Borodavko	000
(France) Thierry Fabre	001

Final
(Japan) Takamasa Anai	110
(France) Thierry Fabre	000

== Pool B ==
First Round
(South Korea) Hwang Hee-Tae	101
(Serbia) Milan Disovic	001
(Russia) Zafar Makhmadov	101
(Mongolia) Temuulen Battulga	000
(Azerbaijan) Elmar Gasimov	010
(Germany) Dino Pfeiffer	000
(Brazil) Luciano Corrêa	001
(United States) Kyle Vashkulat	100
(Georgia (country)) Irakli Tsirekidze	110
(Ukraine) Artem Bloshenko	001
(Uzbekistan) Ramziddin Sayidov	022
(Australia) Joshua Dahl	000

Quarterfinals
(South Korea) Hwang Hee-Tae	020
(Russia) Zafar Makhmadov	000
(Azerbaijan) Elmar Gasimov	100
(Algeria) Hassane Azzoun	000
(United States) Kyle Vashkulat	000
(Cuba) Oreydi Despaigne	110
(Georgia (country)) Irakli Tsirekidze	021
(Uzbekistan) Ramziddin Sayidov	011

Semifinals
(South Korea) Hwang Hee-Tae	000
(Azerbaijan) Elmar Gasimov	100
(Cuba) Oreydi Despaigne	100
(Georgia (country)) Irakli Tsirekidze	000

Final
(Azerbaijan) Elmar Gasimov	000
(Cuba) Oreydi Despaigne	100

== Pool C ==
First Round
(Belgium) Elco van der Geest	020
(Pakistan) Shah Hussain	000
(Tajikistan) Mukhamadmurod Abdurakhmonov	000
(Netherlands) Henk Grol	100
(Philippines) Kenji Yahata	000
(New Zealand) Jason Koster	100
(Kazakhstan) Maxim Rakov	011
(Poland) Przemyslaw Matjaszek	010
(Chinese Taipei) Hong Yi-Chih	000
(France) Frédéric Stiegelmann	101
(Australia) Duke Didier	012
(Mali) Oumar Kone	002
(United States) Shintaro Higashi	001
(South Korea) Park Sun-woo	010

Quarterfinals
(Belgium) Elco van der Geest	100
(Lithuania) Egidijus Žilinskas	001
(Netherlands) Henk Grol	110
(New Zealand) Jason Koster	000
(Kazakhstan) Maxim Rakov	010
(France) Frédéric Stiegelmann	010
(Australia) Duke Didier	000
(South Korea) Park Sun-woo	101

Semifinals
(Belgium) Elco van der Geest	000
(Netherlands) Henk Grol	100
(Kazakhstan) Maxim Rakov	100
(South Korea) Park Sun-woo	010

Final
(Netherlands) Henk Grol	011
(Kazakhstan) Maxim Rakov	000

== Pool D ==
First Round
(Egypt) Ramadan Darwish	011
(Sweden) Martin Pacek	010
(Seychelles) Dominic Dugasse	000
(Bosnia and Herzegovina) Amel Mekić	100
(Moldova) Stanislav Cernega	000
(Georgia (country)) Levan Zhorzholiani	100
(American Samoa) Sebastian Maybir	000
(Uzbekistan) Utkir Kurbanov	100
(Mongolia) Naidangiin Tüvshinbayar	100
(Serbia) Predrag Budic	000
(Japan) Kaihan Takagi	012
(Hungary) Dániel Hadfi	001

Quarterfinals
(Egypt) Ramadan Darwish	101
(Bosnia and Herzegovina) Amel Mekić	000
(Georgia (country)) Levan Zhorzholiani	000
(Uzbekistan) Utkir Kurbanov	101
(Russia) Tagir Khaybulaev	113
(Ukraine) Vyacheslav Denysov	000
(Mongolia) Naidangiin Tüvshinbayar	012
(Japan) Kaihan Takagi	011

Semifinals
(Egypt) Ramadan Darwish	000
(Uzbekistan) Utkir Kurbanov	100
(Russia) Tagir Khaybulaev	001
(Mongolia) Naidangiin Tüvshinbayar	010

Final
(Uzbekistan) Utkir Kurbanov	001
(Mongolia) Naidangiin Tüvshinbayar	020

== Repechage ==
Repechage		Third place
(France) Thierry Fabre	101
(Azerbaijan) Elmar Gasimov	000	(France) Thierry Fabre	020
		(Mongolia) Naidangiin Tüvshinbayar	001

Repechage		Third place
(Kazakhstan) Maxim Rakov	000
(Uzbekistan) Utkir Kurbanov	011	(Uzbekistan) Utkir Kurbanov	010
		(Cuba) Oreydi Despaigne	100

== Finals ==
Semi-finals
(Japan) Takamasa Anai	011
(Cuba) Oreydi Despaigne	001
(Netherlands) Henk Grol	001
(Mongolia) Naidangiin Tüvshinbayar	000

Final
(Japan) Takamasa Anai	001
(Netherlands) Henk Grol	000
