= 2011 World Judo Championships – Men's 100 kg =

Judo competition

Judo Men's 100 kg at the 2011 World Judo Championships
- Venue: Accor Arena
- Location: Paris, France
- Date: 27 August 2011
- Competitors: 57 from 42 nations

Medalists
gold medal	Tagir Khaybulaev (1st title)	Russia
silver medal	Maxim Rakov	Kazakhstan
bronze medal	Irakli Tsirekidze	Georgia
bronze medal	Lukas Krpalek	Czech Republic

Competition at external databases
- Links: IJF • JudoInside

The men's 100 kg competition of the 2011 World Judo Championships was held on August 27.

== Medalists ==
Gold	Silver	Bronze
Tagir Khaybulaev (RUS)	Maxim Rakov (KAZ)	Irakli Tsirekidze (GEO); Lukas Krpalek (CZE)

== Results ==
=== Pool A ===
First Round
(Japan) Takamasa Anai	100
(Argentina) Cristian Schmidt	000
(Georgia (country)) Irakli Tsirekidze	100
(Brazil) Luciano Corrêa	000
(Kyrgyzstan) Aleksei Taskin	001
(Iran) Javad Mahjoub	100
(Belgium) Elco van der Geest	110
(Poland) Przemysław Matyjaszek	000
(Israel) Ariel Ze'evi	100
(New Zealand) Jason Koster	000
(Mongolia) Naidangiin Tüvshinbayar	000
(Latvia) Jevgeņijs Borodavko	001

Quarterfinals
(Japan) Takamasa Anai	101
(Morocco) Youssef Tachroun	000
(Georgia (country)) Irakli Tsirekidze	104
(Iran) Javad Mahjoub	000
(Belgium) Elco van der Geest	110
(Turkey) Feyyaz Yazıcı	000
(Israel) Ariel Ze'evi	000
(Latvia) Jevgeņijs Borodavko	101

Semifinals
(Japan) Takamasa Anai	001
(Georgia (country)) Irakli Tsirekidze	110
(Belgium) Elco van der Geest	001
(Latvia) Jevgeņijs Borodavko	000

Final
(Georgia (country)) Irakli Tsirekidze	010
(Belgium) Elco van der Geest	100

=== Pool B ===
First Round
(Russia) Sergey Samoylovich	101
(Lebanon) Doumit Matar	000
(Uzbekistan) Utkur Kurbanov	100
(India) Yaima Singh Khaidem	001
(Cuba) Oreydi Despaigne	011
(United States) Kyle Vashkulat	000
(Hungary) Balint Farkas	010
(Cameroon) Tchiengang Mbakom	000
(Russia) Tagir Khaybulaev	003
(Ukraine) Vyacheslav Denysov	000
(Germany) Dimitri Peters	100
(South Korea) Park Sun-woo	000
(France) Cyrille Maret	100
(China) Yuan Jinling	000

Quarterfinals
(Russia) Sergey Samoylovich	101
(Uzbekistan) Utkur Kurbanov	000
(Cuba) Oreydi Despaigne	001
(Hungary) Balint Farkas	000
(Russia) Tagir Khaybulaev	100
(Denmark) Christoffer Holmgaard	000
(Germany) Dimitri Peters	100
(France) Cyrille Maret	000

Semifinals
(Russia) Sergey Samoylovich	100
(Cuba) Oreydi Despaigne	000
(Russia) Tagir Khaybulaev	100
(Germany) Dimitri Peters	000

Final
(Russia) Sergey Samoylovich	000
(Russia) Tagir Khaybulaev	100

=== Pool C ===
First Round
(Netherlands) Henk Grol	100
(Mongolia) Temuulen Battulga	000
(Lithuania) Marius Labalaukis	000
(Georgia (country)) Levan Zhorzholiani	101
(Bosnia and Herzegovina) Amel Mekić	101
(United Kingdom) James Austin	010
(Egypt) Ramadan Darwish	100
(Denmark) Frederik Jörgensen	000
(Philippines) Kenji Yahata	000
(Thailand) Teerawat Homklin	100
(Montenegro) Nikola Vulevic	000
(Brazil) Leonardo Leite	101

Quarterfinals
(Netherlands) Henk Grol	010
(Georgia (country)) Levan Zhorzholiani	011
(Azerbaijan) Elmar Gasimov	001
(Bosnia and Herzegovina) Amel Mekić	012
(Egypt) Ramadan Darwish	001
(Japan) Kaihan Takagi	000
(Thailand) Teerawat Homklin	000
(Brazil) Leonardo Leite	101

Semifinals
(Georgia (country)) Levan Zhorzholiani	101
(Bosnia and Herzegovina) Amel Mekić	000
(Egypt) Ramadan Darwish	101
(Brazil) Leonardo Leite	000

Final
(Georgia (country)) Levan Zhorzholiani	000
(Egypt) Ramadan Darwish	001

=== Pool D ===
First Round
(Kazakhstan) Maxim Rakov	001
(Uzbekistan) Ramziddin Sayidov	000
(Serbia) Milan Disovic	000
(Tajikistan) Mukhamadmurod Abdurakhmonov	101
(Morocco) Adil Fikri	000
(Hungary) Dániel Hadfi	001
(South Korea) Hwang Hee-Tae	110
(United States) Shintaro Higashi	000
(Czech Republic) Lukas Krpalek	101
(Cameroon) Franck Moussima	000
(Germany) Dino Pfeiffer	000
(Ukraine) Artem Bloshenko	010

Quarterfinals
(Kazakhstan) Maxim Rakov	010
(Tajikistan) Mukhamadmurod Abdurakhmonov	000
(Hungary) Dániel Hadfi	000
(France) Thierry Fabre	010
(South Korea) Hwang Hee-Tae	100
(Pakistan) Pervez Khan	000
(Czech Republic) Lukas Krpalek	100
(Ukraine) Artem Bloshenko	000

Semifinals
(Kazakhstan) Maxim Rakov	101
(France) Thierry Fabre	001
(South Korea) Hwang Hee-Tae	002
(Czech Republic) Lukas Krpalek	102

Final
(Kazakhstan) Maxim Rakov	010
(Czech Republic) Lukas Krpalek	000

=== Repechage ===
Repechage		Third place
(Georgia (country)) Irakli Tsirekidze	001
(Russia) Sergey Samoylovich	000	(Georgia (country)) Irakli Tsirekidze	010
		(Egypt) Ramadan Darwish	000

Repechage		Third place
(Georgia (country)) Levan Zhorzholiani	010
(Czech Republic) Lukas Krpalek	012	(Czech Republic) Lukas Krpalek	010
		(Belgium) Elco van der Geest	001

=== Finals ===
Semi-finals
(Belgium) Elco van der Geest	000
(Russia) Tagir Khaybulaev	101
(Egypt) Ramadan Darwish	000
(Kazakhstan) Maxim Rakov	002

Final
(Russia) Tagir Khaybulaev	100
(Kazakhstan) Maxim Rakov	000
