= 2014 World Judo Championships – Men's 100 kg =

Judo competition

Judo Men's 100 kg at the 2014 World Judo Championships
- Venue: Traktor Ice Arena
- Location: Chelyabinsk, Russia
- Date: 30 August 2014
- Competitors: 44 from 38 nations
- Total prize money: 14,000$

Medalists
gold medal	Lukáš Krpálek (1st title)	Czech Republic
silver medal	José Armenteros	Cuba
bronze medal	Ivan Remarenco	United Arab Emirates
bronze medal	Karl-Richard Frey	Germany

Competition at external databases
- Links: IJF • JudoInside

The men's 100 kg competition of the 2014 World Judo Championships was held on 30 August.

== Medalists ==
Gold	Silver	Bronze
Lukáš Krpálek (CZE)	José Armenteros (CUB)	Ivan Remarenco (UAE); Karl-Richard Frey (GER)

== Results ==
=== Finals ===
Semi-finals
(Czech Republic) Lukáš Krpálek	000
(Russia) Tagir Khaybulaev	000
(Cuba) José Armenteros	100
(United Arab Emirates) Ivan Remarenco	000

Final
(Czech Republic) Lukáš Krpálek	100
(Cuba) José Armenteros	000

=== Repechage ===
Repechage		Third place
(Sweden) Martin Pacek	010
(Netherlands) Henk Grol	000	(Sweden) Martin Pacek	000
		(United Arab Emirates) Ivan Remarenco	100

Repechage		Third place
(Germany) Karl-Richard Frey	001
(France) Cyrille Maret	000	(Germany) Karl-Richard Frey	001
		(Russia) Tagir Khaybulaev	000

=== Pool A ===
First Round
(Brazil) Luciano Corrêa	100
(Bulgaria) Daniel Dichev	000
(China) Hu Mingchao	100
(San Marino) Karim Gharbi	000
(Hungary) Miklós Cirjenics	000
(Egypt) Ramadan Darwish	111

Quarterfinals
(Czech Republic) Lukáš Krpálek	110
(Brazil) Luciano Corrêa	000
(Ukraine) Artem Bloshenko	100
(Kuwait) Saud Al-Busiri	000
(Sweden) Martin Pacek	102
(China) Hu Mingchao	000
(Belgium) Toma Nikiforov	100
(Egypt) Ramadan Darwish	000

Semifinals
(Czech Republic) Lukáš Krpálek	100
(Ukraine) Artem Bloshenko	000
(Sweden) Martin Pacek	000
(Belgium) Toma Nikiforov	000

Final
(Czech Republic) Lukáš Krpálek	100
(Sweden) Martin Pacek	000

=== Pool B ===
First Round
(Uzbekistan) Soyib Kurbonov	011
(Algeria) Lyès Bouyacoub	010
(Germany) Dimitri Peters	100
(South Korea) Kim Kyeong-tae	010
(Denmark) Frederik Jørgensen	000
(Kazakhstan) Adilkhan Kozybayev	010

Quarterfinals
(Azerbaijan) Elmar Gasimov	000
(Uzbekistan) Soyib Kurbonov	000
(Germany) Dimitri Peters	000
(Russia) Tagir Khaybulaev	000
(Netherlands) Henk Grol	100
(Kazakhstan) Adilkhan Kozybayev	000
(Uruguay) Manuel Bueno	000
(Kyrgyzstan) Bolot Toktogonov	100

Semifinals
(Uzbekistan) Soyib Kurbonov	000
(Russia) Tagir Khaybulaev	010
(Netherlands) Henk Grol	110
(Kyrgyzstan) Bolot Toktogonov	000

Final
(Russia) Tagir Khaybulaev	101
(Netherlands) Henk Grol	000

=== Pool C ===
First Round
(Liechtenstein) David Büchel	000
(Hungary) Gergő Fogasy	100
(Latvia) Jevgeņijs Borodavko	110
(China) Zhang Jun	000
(Serbia) Stefan Jurišić	100
(Malawi) Evance Chikumbu	000

Quarterfinals
(Azerbaijan) Elkhan Mammadov	010
(Hungary) Gergő Fogasy	000
(Cuba) José Armenteros	100
(Latvia) Jevgeņijs Borodavko	000
(Germany) Karl-Richard Frey	101
(Serbia) Stefan Jurišić	000
(Switzerland) Flavio Orlik	101
(Mexico) Sergio García	000

Semifinals
(Azerbaijan) Elkhan Mammadov	000
(Cuba) José Armenteros	100
(Germany) Karl-Richard Frey	001
(Switzerland) Flavio Orlik	000

Final
(Cuba) José Armenteros	100
(Germany) Karl-Richard Frey	000

=== Pool D ===
First Round
(Democratic Republic of the Congo) Prince Kambere	000
(Venezuela) Anthoni Peña	100
(Tajikistan) Dadakhon Kurbonaliev	000
(Ukraine) Dmytro Berezhnyi	100
(Canada) Kyle Reyes	101
(Pakistan) Shah Hussain Shah	000

Quarterfinals
(France) Cyrille Maret	101
(Venezuela) Anthoni Peña	000
(Portugal) Jorge Fonseca	100
(Ukraine) Dmytro Berezhnyi	000
(Kazakhstan) Maxim Rakov	000
(Mongolia) Naidangiin Tüvshinbayar	001
(United Arab Emirates) Ivan Remarenco	100
(Canada) Kyle Reyes	000

Semifinals
(France) Cyrille Maret	100
(Portugal) Jorge Fonseca	001
(Mongolia) Naidangiin Tüvshinbayar	000
(United Arab Emirates) Ivan Remarenco	100

Final
(France) Cyrille Maret	001
(United Arab Emirates) Ivan Remarenco	100

== Prize money ==
The sums listed bring the total prizes awarded to 14,000$ for the individual event.

Medal	Total	Judoka	Coach
Gold	6,000$	4,800$	1,200$
Silver	4,000$	3,200$	800$
Bronze	2,000$	1,600$	400$
