= Mongolia at the 2012 Summer Olympics =

- IOC code: MGL
- NOC: Mongolian National Olympic Committee
- Website: www.olympic.mn (in Mongolian)

in London
- Competitors: 29 in 7 sports
- Flag bearers: Ser-Od Bat-Ochir (opening); Nyambayaryn Tögstsogt (closing)
- Medals Ranked 58th: Gold 0 Silver 2 Bronze 3 Total 5

Summer Olympics appearances (overview)
- 1964; 1968; 1972; 1976; 1980; 1984; 1988; 1992; 1996; 2000; 2004; 2008; 2012; 2016; 2020; 2024

Mongolia competed at the 2012 Summer Olympics in London, from 27 July to 12 August 2012. This was the nation's twelfth appearance at the Olympics, except the 1984 Summer Olympics in Los Angeles, because of its partial support to the Soviet boycott.

The Mongolian National Olympic Committee sent the nation's largest delegation to the Games since 1992. A total of 29 athletes, 16 men and 13 women, competed in 7 sports. The Mongolian team featured past Olympic champions, including judoka Naidangiin Tüvshinbayar, who became the nation's first ever gold medalist, and pistol shooter Otryadyn Gündegmaa, who won the silver in Beijing. Marathon runner Ser-Od Bat-Ochir, who competed at his third Olympics, was Mongolia's flag bearer at the opening ceremony.

This was Mongolia's most successful Olympics, winning the total of five Olympic medals (2 silver and 3 bronze), and surpassing the record from Beijing by just one medal. These medals were awarded to athletes in boxing, judo, and wrestling. Judoka Naidangiin Tüvshinbayar became the first Mongolian athlete to win two medals in Olympic history, including the silver in London. Meanwhile, boxer Nyambayaryn Tögstsogt, the youngest member of the contingent, at age 20, claimed the silver medal in men's flyweight division. Through social media, Mongolia dominated the standings as the nation with the most tweets for these Olympic games.

== Medalists ==
| Medal | Name | Sport | Event | Date |
|---|---|---|---|---|
| Silver | Naidangiin Tüvshinbayar | Judo | Men's 100 kg | 2 August |
| Silver | Nyambayaryn Tögstsogt | Boxing | Men's flyweight | 12 August |
| Bronze | Sainjargalyn Nyam-Ochir | Judo | Men's 73 kg | 30 July |
| Bronze | Soronzonboldyn Battsetseg | Wrestling | Women's freestyle 63 kg | 8 August |
| Bronze | Uranchimegiin Mönkh-Erdene | Boxing | Men's light welterweight | 10 August |

== Archery ==
Mongolia has qualified one archer for the men's individual event and one archer for the women's individual event

| Athlete | Event | Ranking round | | Round of 64 | Round of 32 | Round of 16 | Quarterfinals | Semifinals | Final / BM | |
| Athlete | Event | Score | Seed | Opposition Score | Opposition Score | Opposition Score | Opposition Score | Opposition Score | Opposition Score | Rank |
|---|---|---|---|---|---|---|---|---|---|---|
| Jantsangiin Gantögs | Men's individual | 669 | 19 | Banerjee (IND) (46); L 0–6 | Did not advance | | | | | |
| Bishindeegiin Urantungalag | Women's individual | 652 | 18 | Williamson (GBR) (47); W 7–3 | Nichols (USA) (15); W 6–4 | Lee S-J (KOR) (2); L 0–6 | Did not advance | | | |

== Athletics ==
Mongolian athletes have so far achieved qualifying standards in the following athletics events (up to a maximum of 3 athletes in each event at the 'A' Standard, and 1 at the 'B' Standard):

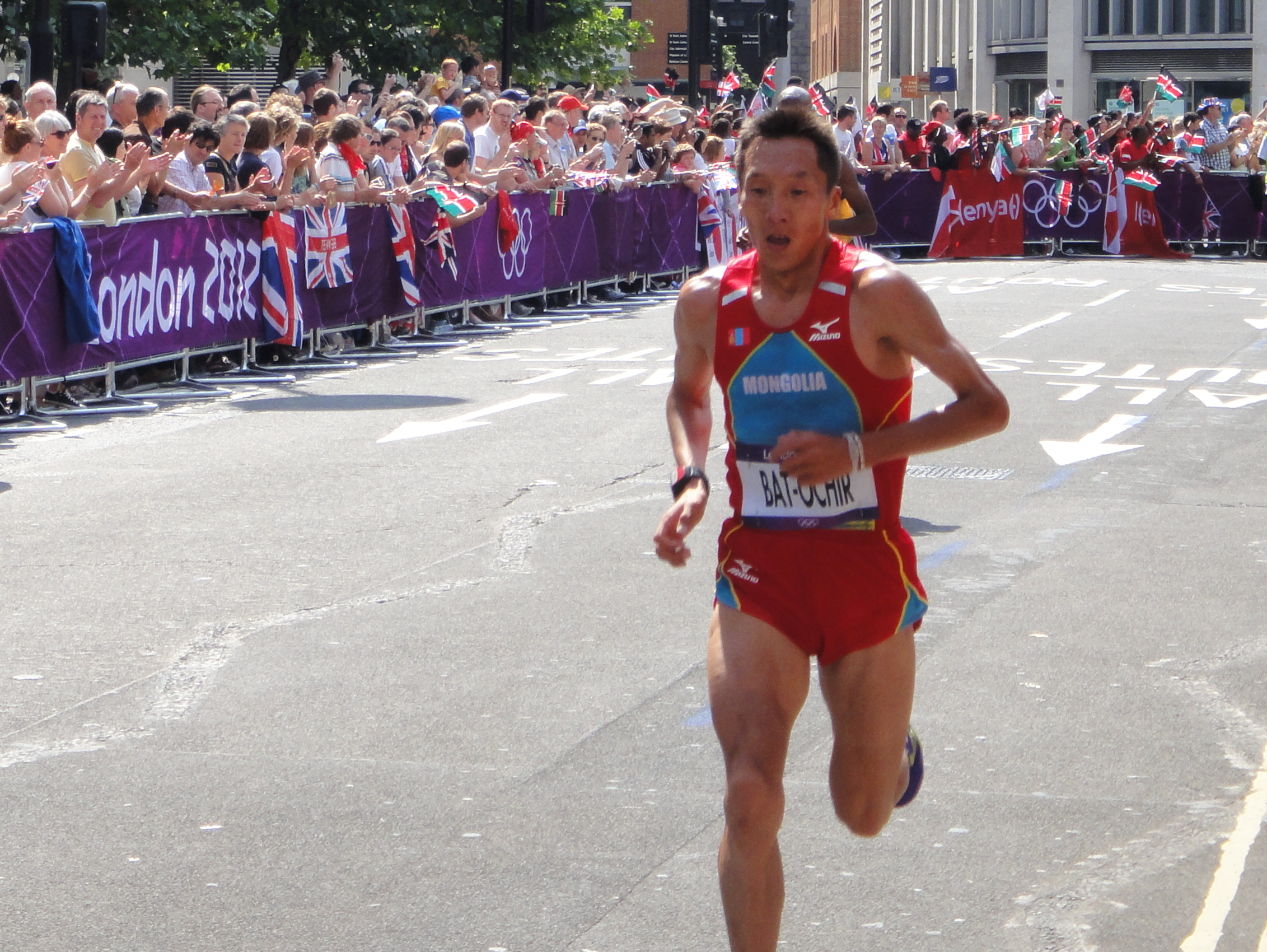
Bat-Ochir Ser-Od finished fifty-first in men's marathon.

Key

- Note – Ranks given for track events are within the athlete's heat only
- Q = Qualified for the next round
- q = Qualified for the next round as a fastest loser or, in field events, by position without achieving the qualifying target
- NR = National record
- N/A = Round not applicable for the event
- Bye = Athlete not required to compete in round

Men

| Athlete | Event | Final | |
| Athlete | Event | Result | Rank |
|---|---|---|---|
| Bat-Ochir Ser-Od | Marathon | 2:20:10 | 51 |

Women

| Athlete | Event | Final | |
| Athlete | Event | Result | Rank |
|---|---|---|---|
| Luvsanlkhündegiin Otgonbayar | Marathon | 2:52:15 | 102 |

== Boxing ==
Four Mongolian boxers competed in London, all in the men's competitions; two medals were won by the team.

Men

| Athlete | Event | Round of 32 | Round of 16 | Quarterfinals | Semifinals | Final | |
| Athlete | Event | Opposition Result | Opposition Result | Opposition Result | Opposition Result | Opposition Result | Rank |
|---|---|---|---|---|---|---|---|
| Pürevdorjiin Serdamba | Light flyweight | Bye | Singh (IND); L 11–16 | Did not advance | | | |
| Nyambayaryn Tögstsogt | Flyweight | Mamishzada (AZE); W 18–11 | Picardi (ITA); W 17–16 | Latipov (UZB); W 15–10 | Aloyan (RUS); W 15–11 | Ramírez (CUB); L 14–17 | 2nd place, silver medalist(s) |
| Uranchimegiin Mönkh-Erdene | Light welterweight | Chládek (CZE); W 20–12 | Colin (MRI); W 15–12 | Stalker (GBR); W 23–22 | Berinchyk (UKR); L 21–29 | Did not advance | 3rd place, bronze medalist(s) |
| Byambyn Tüvshinbat | Welterweight | Mitoumba (GAB); W 17–4 | Vastine (FRA); L 12–13 | Did not advance | | | |

== Judo ==
The final competitors' list was announced on 7 June.

Men

| Athlete | Event | Round of 64 | Round of 32 | Round of 16 | Quarterfinals | Semifinals | Repechage | Final / BM | |
| Athlete | Event | Opposition Result | Opposition Result | Opposition Result | Opposition Result | Opposition Result | Opposition Result | Opposition Result | Rank |
|---|---|---|---|---|---|---|---|---|---|
| Davaadorjiin Tömörkhüleg | −60 kg | Bye | Kitadai (BRA); L 0000–0011 | Did not advance | | | | | |
| Khashbaataryn Tsagaanbaatar | −66 kg | Bye | Tu K-w (TPE); W 0111–0001 | Oates (GBR); L 0000–0011 | Did not advance | | | | |
| Sainjargalyn Nyam-Ochir | −73 kg | Bye | Völk (GER); W 0113–0101 | Soroka (UKR); W 0011–0002 | Isaev (RUS); L 0001–0100 | Did not advance | Delpopolo (USA); W 0011–0002 | Elmont (NED); W 0001–0000 | 3rd place, bronze medalist(s) |
| Naidangiin Tüvshinbayar | −100 kg | —N/a | Homklin (THA); W 1000–0000 | Fabre (FRA); W 0100–0000 | Sayidov (UZB); W 0100–0001 | Hwang H-T (KOR); W 0010–0001 | BYE | Khaibulaev (RUS); L 0000–1000 | 2nd place, silver medalist(s) |

Women

| Athlete | Event | Round of 32 | Round of 16 | Quarterfinals | Semifinals | Repechage | Final / BM | |
| Athlete | Event | Opposition Result | Opposition Result | Opposition Result | Opposition Result | Opposition Result | Opposition Result | Rank |
|---|---|---|---|---|---|---|---|---|
| Mönkhbatyn Urantsetseg | −48 kg | Bye | Podryadova (KAZ); W 0010–0001 | Dumitru (ROU); L 0001–0011 | Did not advance | Pareto (ARG); L 0011–0002 | Did not advance | 7 |
| Mönkhbaataryn Bundmaa | −52 kg | Desravine (HAI); W 0100–0000 | Bermoy (CUB); L 0000–0020 | Did not advance | | | | |
| Dorjsürengiin Sumiya | −57 kg | Kim J-d (KOR); L 0001–0001 | Did not advance | | | | | |
| Munkhzaya Tsedevsuren | −63 kg | Anson (PLW); W 1100–0000 | Ylinen (FIN); W 1000–0000 | Émane (FRA); W 0001–0001 YUS | Žolnir (SLO); L 0000–1000 | Bye | Ueno (JPN); L 0002–0010 | 5 |
| Pürevjargalyn Lkhamdegd | −78 kg | Bye | Gibbons (GBR); L 0001–0021 | Did not advance | | | | |

== Shooting ==
Men

| Athlete | Event | Qualification | | Final | |
| Athlete | Event | Points | Rank | Points | Rank |
|---|---|---|---|---|---|
| Nyantain Bayaraa | 50 m rifle 3 positions | 1154 | 33 | Did not advance | |
| Nyantain Bayaraa | 50 m rifle prone | 588 | 40 | Did not advance | |
| Nyantain Bayaraa | 10 m air rifle | 593 | 23 | Did not advance | |

Women

| Athlete | Event | Qualification | | Final | |
| Athlete | Event | Points | Rank | Points | Rank |
|---|---|---|---|---|---|
| Otryadyn Gündegmaa | 10 m air pistol | 380 | 18 | Did not advance | |
| Otryadyn Gündegmaa | 25 m pistol | 577 | 27 | Did not advance | |

== Swimming ==
Two athletes will compete by invitation.

Men

| Athlete | Event | Heat | | Semifinal | | Final | |
| Athlete | Event | Time | Rank | Time | Rank | Time | Rank |
|---|---|---|---|---|---|---|---|
| Andryein Tamir | 100 m freestyle | 56.37 | 49 | Did not advance | | | |

Women

| Athlete | Event | Heat | | Semifinal | | Final | |
| Athlete | Event | Time | Rank | Time | Rank | Time | Rank |
|---|---|---|---|---|---|---|---|
| Gantömöriin Oyungerel | 100 m breaststroke | 1:27.17 | 45 | Did not advance | | | |

== Wrestling ==
Mongolia has so far qualified the following quota places.

Key

- VT – Victory by Fall.
- PP – Decision by Points – the loser with technical points.
- PO – Decision by Points – the loser without technical points.

Men's freestyle

| Athlete | Event | Qualification | Round of 16 | Quarterfinal | Semifinal | Repechage 1 | Repechage 2 | Final / BM | |
| Athlete | Event | Opposition Result | Opposition Result | Opposition Result | Opposition Result | Opposition Result | Opposition Result | Opposition Result | Rank |
|---|---|---|---|---|---|---|---|---|---|
| Bayaraagiin Naranbaatar | −55 kg | Rahimi (IRI); L 0–3 ^{PO} | Did not advance | | | | | | 19 |
| Pürevjavyn Önörbat | −74 kg | Khutsishvili (GEO); L 1–3 ^{PP} | Did not advance | | | | | | 17 |
| Orgodolyn Üitümen | −84 kg | Bye | Marsagishvili (GEO); L 1–3 ^{PP} | Did not advance | | | | | 14 |
| Jargalsaikhany Chuluunbat | −120 kg | Bye | Ndiaye (SEN); W 3–0 ^{PO} | Makhov (RUS); L 1–3 ^{PP} | Did not advance | | | | 5 |

Women's freestyle

| Athlete | Event | Qualification | Round of 16 | Quarterfinal | Semifinal | Repechage 1 | Repechage 2 | Final / BM | |
| Athlete | Event | Opposition Result | Opposition Result | Opposition Result | Opposition Result | Opposition Result | Opposition Result | Opposition Result | Rank |
|---|---|---|---|---|---|---|---|---|---|
| Davaasükhiin Otgontsetseg | −48 kg | Castillo (COL); W 3–0 ^{PO} | Matkowska (POL); L 0–5 ^{VT} | Did not advance | | | | | 9 |
| Sündeviin Byambatseren | −55 kg | Mattsson (SWE); L 0–3 ^{PO} | Did not advance | | | | | | 17 |
| Soronzonboldyn Battsetseg | −63 kg | Bye | Datty (CAF); W 3–0 ^{PO} | Grigorjeva (LAT); W 3–0 ^{PO} | Icho (JPN); L 0–3 ^{PO} | Bye | Bye | Dugrenier (CAN); W 3–0 ^{PO} | 3rd place, bronze medalist(s) |
| Ochirbatyn Burmaa | −72 kg | Bye | Callahan (CAN); W 3–0 ^{PO} | Unda (ESP); L 1–3 ^{PP} | Did not advance | | | | 8 |
