= 2013 World Judo Championships – Men's 100 kg =

Judo competition

Judo Men's 100 kg at the 2013 World Judo Championships
- Venue: Ginásio do Maracanãzinho
- Location: Rio de Janeiro, Brazil
- Date: 31 August 2013
- Competitors: 47 from 41 nations

Medalists
gold medal	Elkhan Mammadov (1st title)	Azerbaijan
silver medal	Henk Grol	Netherlands
bronze medal	Lukáš Krpálek	Czech Republic
bronze medal	Dimitri Peters	Germany

Competition at external databases
- Links: IJF • JudoInside

The men's 100 kg competition of the 2013 World Judo Championships was held on August 31.

== Medalists ==
Gold	Silver	Bronze
Elkhan Mammadov (AZE)	Henk Grol (NED)	Lukáš Krpálek (CZE); Dimitri Peters (GER)

== Results ==
=== Pool A ===
First Round
(Seychelles) Dominic Dugasse	000
(Israel) Or Sasson	101
(Spain) David Alarza	100
(Afghanistan) Mohammad Tawfiq Bakhshi	000
(Australia) Duke Didier	000
(Japan) Takashi Ono	101
(Argentina) Héctor Campos	000
(Sweden) Martin Pacek	100

Quarterfinals
(Azerbaijan) Elkhan Mammadov	110
(Israel) Or Sasson	002
(Spain) David Alarza	100
(Pakistan) Shah Hussain	000
(Egypt) Ramadan Darwish	000
(Japan) Takashi Ono	001
(United Kingdom) Philip Awitialcaraz	000
(Sweden) Martin Pacek	110

Semifinals
(Azerbaijan) Elkhan Mammadov	010
(Spain) David Alarza	000
(Japan) Takashi Ono	011
(Sweden) Martin Pacek	000

Final
(Azerbaijan) Elkhan Mammadov	010
(Japan) Takashi Ono	000

=== Pool B ===
First Round
(Algeria) Lyès Bouyacoub	010
(Uzbekistan) Soyib Kurbonov	100
(Ukraine) Dmytro Luchyn	100
(Belarus) Alan Khugaev	000
(Czech Republic) Michal Horák	000
(Brazil) Luciano Corrêa	101

Quarterfinals
(Iran) Javad Mahjoub	000
(Uzbekistan) Soyib Kurbonov	101
(Latvia) Jevgeņijs Borodavko	101
(Ukraine) Dmytro Luchyn	000
(France) Cyrille Maret	100
(Brazil) Luciano Corrêa	000
(Georgia (country)) Levan Zhorzholiani	100
(Cameroon) Stephane Ombiongno	000

Semifinals
(Uzbekistan) Soyib Kurbonov	101
(Latvia) Jevgeņijs Borodavko	000
(France) Cyrille Maret	100
(Georgia (country)) Levan Zhorzholiani	000

Final
(Uzbekistan) Soyib Kurbonov	101
(France) Cyrille Maret	000

=== Pool C ===
First Round
(South Korea) Shim Ji-Ho	000
(Turkey) Feyyaz Yazıcı	000
(United Arab Emirates) Ivan Remarenco	000
(Italy) Domenico Di Guida	000
(Ukraine) Artem Bloshenko	100
(Kuwait) Yousef Al-Enezi	000
(Brazil) Renan Nunes	000
(Germany) Dimitri Peters	001

Quarterfinals
(Netherlands) Henk Grol	100
(South Korea) Shim Ji-Ho	000
(Italy) Domenico Di Guida	000
(Tunisia) Anis Ben Khaled	000
(Azerbaijan) Elmar Gasimov	012
(Ukraine) Artem Bloshenko	000
(Mexico) Sergio García	000
(Germany) Dimitri Peters	100

Semifinals
(Netherlands) Henk Grol	100
(Tunisia) Anis Ben Khaled	000
(Azerbaijan) Elmar Gasimov	000
(Germany) Dimitri Peters	001

Final
(Netherlands) Henk Grol	000
(Germany) Dimitri Peters	000

=== Pool D ===
First Round
(Hungary) Miklós Cirjenics	010
(Kazakhstan) Maxim Rakov	110
(United States) Myles Porter	000
(Uruguay) Manuel Bueno	100
(New Zealand) Jason Koster	100
(Ecuador) José Merlin	000
(Latvia) Viktor Reško	000
(Cuba) José Armenteros	100

Quarterfinals
(Czech Republic) Lukáš Krpálek	100
(Kazakhstan) Maxim Rakov	000
(Portugal) Jorge Fonseca	100
(Uruguay) Manuel Bueno	000
(Uzbekistan) Ramziddin Sayidov	110
(New Zealand) Jason Koster	000
(Kyrgyzstan) Bolot Toktogonov	000
(Cuba) José Armenteros	100

Semifinals
(Czech Republic) Lukáš Krpálek	101
(Portugal) Jorge Fonseca	000
(Uzbekistan) Ramziddin Sayidov	100
(Cuba) José Armenteros	000

Final
(Czech Republic) Lukáš Krpálek	000
(Uzbekistan) Ramziddin Sayidov	000

=== Finals ===
Semi-finals
(Azerbaijan) Elkhan Mammadov	011
(Uzbekistan) Soyib Kurbonov	000
(Netherlands) Henk Grol	100
(Czech Republic) Lukáš Krpálek	000

Final
(Azerbaijan) Elkhan Mammadov	010
(Netherlands) Henk Grol	000

=== Repechage ===
Repechage		Third place
(Japan) Takashi Ono	001
(France) Cyrille Maret	000	(Japan) Takashi Ono	000
		(Czech Republic) Lukáš Krpálek	001

Repechage		Third place
(Germany) Dimitri Peters	100
(Uzbekistan) Ramziddin Sayidov	000	(Germany) Dimitri Peters	010
		(Uzbekistan) Soyib Kurbonov	001
