= Judo at the 2012 Summer Olympics – Men's 100 kg =

Men's 100 kg at the Games of the XXX Olympiad
- Venue: ExCeL Exhibition Centre
- Date: 2 August 2012
- Competitors: 30 from 30 nations

Medalists
1st place, gold medalist(s)		Tagir Khaybulaev	Russia
2nd place, silver medalist(s)		Naidangiin Tüvshinbayar	Mongolia
3rd place, bronze medalist(s)		Dimitri Peters	Germany
3rd place, bronze medalist(s)		Henk Grol	Netherlands

The men's 100 kg competition in judo at the 2012 Summer Olympics in London, United Kingdom, took place at ExCeL London between 28 July and 2 August.

The gold and silver medals were determined by a single-elimination tournament, with the winner of the final taking gold and the loser receiving silver. Judo events awarded two bronze medals. Quarterfinal losers competed in a repechage match for the right to face a semifinal loser for a bronze medal (that is, the judokas defeated in quarterfinals A and B competed against each other, with the winner of that match facing the semifinal loser from the other half of the bracket).

== Schedule ==
All times are British Summer Time (UTC+1)

Date	Time	Round
Thursday, 2 August 2012	09:30; 14:00; 16:10	Qualifications; Semifinals; Final

== Results ==
=== Finals ===
Semi-finals
Hwang Hee-Tae (KOR)	0001
Naidangiin Tüvshinbayar (MGL)	0010
Dimitri Peters (GER)	0001
Tagir Khaybulaev (RUS)	0000

Final
Naidangiin Tüvshinbayar (MGL)	0000
Tagir Khaybulaev (RUS)	1000

=== Repechages ===
Repechage		Bronze medal
Elmar Gasimov (AZE)	0000
Ramziddin Sayidov (UZB)	1000	Ramziddin Sayidov (UZB)	0010
		Dimitri Peters (GER)	0200

Repechage		Bronze medal
Henk Grol (NED)	1010
Lukáš Krpálek (CZE)	0000	Henk Grol (NED)	0100
		Hwang Hee-Tae (KOR)	0000

=== Pool A ===
First round		Second round		Quarterfinals
M Rakov (KAZ)	0000
E Gasimov (AZE)	0011	E Gasimov (AZE)	0011
D Brata (ROU)	0013	L Zhorzholiani (GEO)	0002
L Zhorzholiani (GEO)	0102			E Gasimov (AZE)	0002
H-T Hwang (KOR)	0021			H-T Hwang (KOR)	0021
A Mekić (BIH)	0002	H-T Hwang (KOR)	1001
D Kelly (AUS)	0003	A Bloshenko (UKR)	000
A Bloshenko (UKR)	0100

=== Pool B ===
First round		Second round		Quarterfinals
T Naidangiin (MGL)	1000
T Homklin (THA)	0000	T Naidangiin (MGL)	100
T Fabre (FRA)	0011	T Fabre (FRA)	000
R Darwish (EGY)	0002			T Naidangiin (MGL)	100
R Sayidov (UZB)	1000			R Sayidov (UZB)	0001
K Vashkulat (USA)	0000	R Sayidov (UZB)	102
		O Despaigne (CUB)	010H

=== Pool C ===
First round		Second round		Quarterfinals
H Grol (NED)	1001
D Dugasse (SEY)	0000	H Grol (NED)	0101
O Kone (MLI)	0002	L Corrêa (BRA)	0003
L Corrêa (BRA)	0102			H Grol (NED)	0001
A Ze'evi (ISR)	0000			D Peters (GER)	0100
D Peters (GER)	1000	D Peters (GER)	0011
J Borodavko (LAT)	100	J Borodavko (LAT)	000
A Liu (ASA)	000

=== Pool D ===
First round
T Anai (JPN)	0101
J Austin (GBR)	0003
T Khaybulaev (RUS)	100
E van der Geest (BEL)	000
Y Biadulin (BLR)	1001
C Schmidt (ARG)	000

Second round
T Anai (JPN)	000
L Krpálek (CZE)	1001
T Khaybulaev (RUS)	0111
Y Biadulin (BLR)	0003

Quarterfinals
L Krpálek (CZE)	0011
T Khaybulaev (RUS)	100
