= Shintaro Higashi =

American judoka

Personal information
- Nickname: Sensei
- Born: 14 December 1984 (age 41)
- Occupation: Judoka
- Height: 5 ft 10 in (178 cm)
- Weight: 100 kg (220 lb)
- Website: Website

Sport
- Sport: Judo, Aikido, Karate, BJJ, Jūjutsu
- Rank: 6th Dan Black belt in judo Black belt in Brazilian jiu-jitsu
- Club: Kokushi Budo Institute
- Coached by: Nobuyoshi Higashi
Medal record
Men's Judo
Representing United States
USA Judo Senior National Championships
Bronze medal – third place	USA Judo Senior National Championships	2015
Gold medal – first place	USA Judo Senior National Championships	2011
Bronze medal – third place	USA Judo Senior National Championships	2009
Gold medal – first place	USA Judo Senior National Championships	2007
Bronze medal – third place	USA Judo Senior National Championships	2003

Profile at external databases
- JudoInside.com: 29803

Shintaro Higashi (born December 16, 1984) is a Japanese-American judo competitor and 6th degree black belt in judo for the United States in the 100 kg category. He is the head instructor at the Kokushi Budo Institute, a member of the New York Athletic Club, and a professor at Brooklyn College.

== Personal life ==
He attended Hunter College, where he earned a bachelor's degree in psychology and a master's degree in education. He also attended NYU Stern where he earned an MBA. While at Hunter, he was a member of the wrestling team, on which he received All-State status. He is the son of Nobuyoshi Higashi, the founder of Kokushi-ryu jujutsu and a Judo, Aikido, and Karate instructor. Higashi is also fluent in Japanese.

== Martial arts ==
He holds black belts in Judo, Brazilian Jiu Jitsu, jujitsu, Aikido, and Karate. He received a red and white (6.dan) belt in Judo in 2017 at the age of 32, becoming one of the youngest people to ever achieve the rank. He has also inherited his father's dojo, Kokushi Budo Institute in New York City.

He has won Gold in the 2007, 2011 USA Judo Senior National Championships and placed 5th in the US Open. He also took Gold in the International Tournament Am-Cam Judo Challenge and placed third in the National Championships. He would be a member of Team USA in 2007, 2010 World Judo Championships – Men's 100 kg and 2011 World Judo Championships – Men's 100 kg for the world games. He trained for the 2008 and the 2012 US Olympic Team at 100 kg. He achieved 43rd in the world ranking for Judo behind Kyle Vashkulat in the United States. He has also trained in freestyle wrestling, boxing and has a black belt in Brazilian jiu-jitsu under Brian Glick.

He has a martial arts (primarily Judo)-focused Youtube channel with over 270 000 subscribers.
