= Judo at the 2010 Asian Games – Men's 100 kg =

Judo competition

Men's 100 kg at the 2010 Asian Games
- Venue: Huagong Gymnasium
- Date: 13 November 2010
- Competitors: 17 from 17 nations

Medalists
| gold medal | Hwang Hee-tae | South Korea |
| silver medal | Takamasa Anai | Japan |
| bronze medal | Maxim Rakov | Kazakhstan |
| bronze medal | Ramziddin Sayidov | Uzbekistan |

The men's 100 kilograms (half heavyweight) competition at the 2010 Asian Games in Guangzhou was held on 13 November at the Huagong Gymnasium.

== Schedule ==
All times are China Standard Time (UTC+08:00)

| Date | Time | Event |
|---|---|---|
| Saturday, 13 November 2010 | 10:00 | Preliminary 1 |
| Saturday, 13 November 2010 | 10:00 | Preliminary 2 |
| Saturday, 13 November 2010 | 10:00 | Quarterfinals |
| Saturday, 13 November 2010 | 15:00 | Final of repechage |
| Saturday, 13 November 2010 | 15:00 | Final of table |
| Saturday, 13 November 2010 | 15:00 | Finals |

== Results ==
Legend

- WO — Won by walkover

=== Main bracket ===
==== Final ====
| Gold medal |
| Takamasa Anai (JPN) | 000 |
| Hwang Hee-tae (KOR) | 100 |

==== Top half ====
Preliminary 1

Preliminary 2
Takamasa Anai (JPN) | 100
Zein Tamra (LIB) | 000
Javad Mahjoub (IRI) | 100
Kenji Yahata (PHI) | 000
Naidangiin Tüvshinbayar (MGL) | WO
Zafar Madaminow (TKM)
Mukhamadmurod Abdurakhmonov (TJK) | 101
Reda Nafwa (QAT) | 000

Quarterfinals
Takamasa Anai (JPN) | 100
Javad Mahjoub (IRI) | 000
Naidangiin Tüvshinbayar (MGL) | 000
Mukhamadmurod Abdurakhmonov (TJK) | 100

Final of table
Takamasa Anai (JPN) | 101
Mukhamadmurod Abdurakhmonov (TJK) | 000

==== Bottom half ====
Preliminary 1
Khaled Al-Araifi (BRN) | 101
Đặng Hào (VIE) | 000

Preliminary 2
Hwang Hee-tae (KOR) | 111
Yahya Al-Hammadi (UAE) | 000
Shao Ning (CHN) | 101
Yousef Al-Enezi (IOC) | 000
Maxim Rakov (KAZ) | 100
Shah Hussain Shah (PAK) | 000
Ramziddin Sayidov (UZB) | 100
Khaled Al-Araifi (BRN) | 000

Quarterfinals
Hwang Hee-tae (KOR) | 020
Shao Ning (CHN) | 000
Maxim Rakov (KAZ) | 010
Ramziddin Sayidov (UZB) | 001

Final of table
Hwang Hee-tae (KOR) | 001
Maxim Rakov (KAZ) | 001

=== Repechage ===
Final of repechage
Javad Mahjoub (IRI) | 000
Naidangiin Tüvshinbayar (MGL) | 101
Shao Ning (CHN) | 000
Ramziddin Sayidov (UZB) | 020

Bronze medals
Naidangiin Tüvshinbayar (MGL) | 001
Maxim Rakov (KAZ) | 101
Ramziddin Sayidov (UZB) | 020
Mukhamadmurod Abdurakhmonov (TJK) | 000
