= Fugakukai International Association =

Fugakukai International Association, is an organization that promotes the teaching of the martial arts of Kihara aikido, Kodokan judo, and Shindo Muso-ryu jōdō. The name Fugakukai (富嶽會) means literally "happy mountain peak association". Currently, Fugakukai dojo are located in the United States with one dojo in Canada.

== History ==
Karl Geis (1933 – April 8, 2014, in Houston, Texas) is a judo, aikido, and jodo instructor. Geis was promoted to 4th dan in judo at the Kodokan in 1967 and to 6th dan in aikido by Kenji Tomiki in 1979. Geis was a founding member of the USJF Texas Yudanshakai and later, of the United States Judo Association who promoted him to 10th dan on March 12, 2014. Geis was also promoted to 10th dan in Fugakukai Aikido by the board of instructors of Fugakukai. Geis lists as primary influences, his Japanese aikido, judo, and jodo instructors; Kenji Tomiki, Tsunako Miyake, Yoshimi Osawa, Sumiyuki Kotani, Toshiro Daigo, Kazuo Kudo, and Tatsukuma Ushijima.

Tsunako Miyake (born 1926). One of Kenji Tomiki’s early students and instructor of several notable aikidoka, including Karl Geis, Takeshi Inoue and Nobuyoshi Higashi. The Aikido Journal Encyclopedia of Aikido lists her as 6th dan Tomiki Aikido-JAA, 6th dan Kodokan judo, and 6th dan Shindo Muso-ryu jodo, Karl Geis’ webpage lists Miyake as 7th dan Kodokan Judo and 8th dan Tomiki Aikido.

Takeshi Inoue (born 5 January 1946). Student of Kenji Tomiki at Waseda University Aikido Club during the 1960s. Taught with Dr. Lee Ah Loi in London during the late 1960s. Intermittent instructor of Karl Geis both in Japan and the United States during the 1970s. The Encyclopedia of Aikido lists Inoue as 6th dan Tomiki Aikido-JAA and 3rd dan Kodokan judo.

Hiroaki (Riki) Kogure (born 1936). Student of Kenji Tomiki at Waseda University in the 1950s. Taught aikido in England and organized the British Aikido Association. Taught aikido at Karl Geis’ dojo for six years in the 1970s. Former chairperson of the Japan Aikido Association. The Encyclopedia of Aikido lists Kogure as 8th dan Tomiki Aikido-JAA.

Yoji Kondo (A.K.A. Eric Kotani) (born 1933). PhD astrophysicist and science fiction author. Studied Judo in Japan and began Tomiki Aikido in the early 1970s at Karl Geis’ dojo in Houston, Texas. Acted as translator between Geis and Tomiki. The Encyclopedia of Aikido lists Kondo as 6th dan Tomiki Aikido-JAA.

Upon his return to the United States in the late 1950s, Geis began teaching judo and aikido in Houston, Texas. In 1967, Tomiki instructed Geis to promote aikido as an alternative for older judoka who were retiring from competition. Tomiki apparently felt that experienced judoka would readily adopt and develop his style of aikido. Fugakukai was founded in 1982 by Geis, Miyake and Inoue.

== Judo in Fugakukai ==
As a founding member of the Texas yudanshakai and the United States Judo Association, Karl Geis has remained a notable figure in Judo in the United States. Geis refers to his judo as reminiscent of the judo that was being practiced in the 1950s in the Kodokan by his instructors. He is also notable for having combined the off balancing strategies of Tomiki aikido with judo. Fugakukai by-laws also enable recreational players to participate for self-improvement and still be able to rank without having to accumulate competition and competition-service points. Geis is known in the judo world for his expertise in sweeping techniques and his groundwork.

== Aikido in Fugakukai ==
Aikido in Fugakukai began as a direct transmission of Tomiki’s style of aikido through Geis to his students in Houston Texas, but the system rapidly evolved in the new environment. Geis found his students to be typically older than Tomiki’s university students and he found those students to be generally uninterested in shiai (competition) even as a training tool. A group of Japanese instructors characterized Geis’ students as more concerned with developing the self-defense aspects of aikido than were Japanese students. Under these conditions, the tanto randori of the Shodokan was dropped and toshu (empty hand) randori developed into the primary randori method.

As Geis’ students became more experienced with the new randori system, their randori experiences began informing their practice of kata, leading to greater differences between the kata practiced in Fugakukai and Shodokan. In the late 1990s this mass of evolutionary changes in the randori and kata systems led to Geis renaming the Fugakukai aikido style Kihara Aikido.

== Jyodo in Fugakukai ==
The Fugakukai also teaches the seitei kata of Shindo Muso-ryu jodo. The primary influences on Fugakukai Jyodo have been Tsunako Miyake’s teachings as interpreted by Geis.

== Groups That Have Separated from Fugakukai ==
Over the years since its inception, several groups of schools have separated from the Fugakukai. The largest of these groups include the Jiyushinkai, the International Aikido Alliance, the American Tomiki Aikido Association, the Zantoppakai 斬突破会 合気道 (formerly the Zantotsukai), and the Kaze Uta Budokai.
