= Elco van der Geest =

Belgian judoka

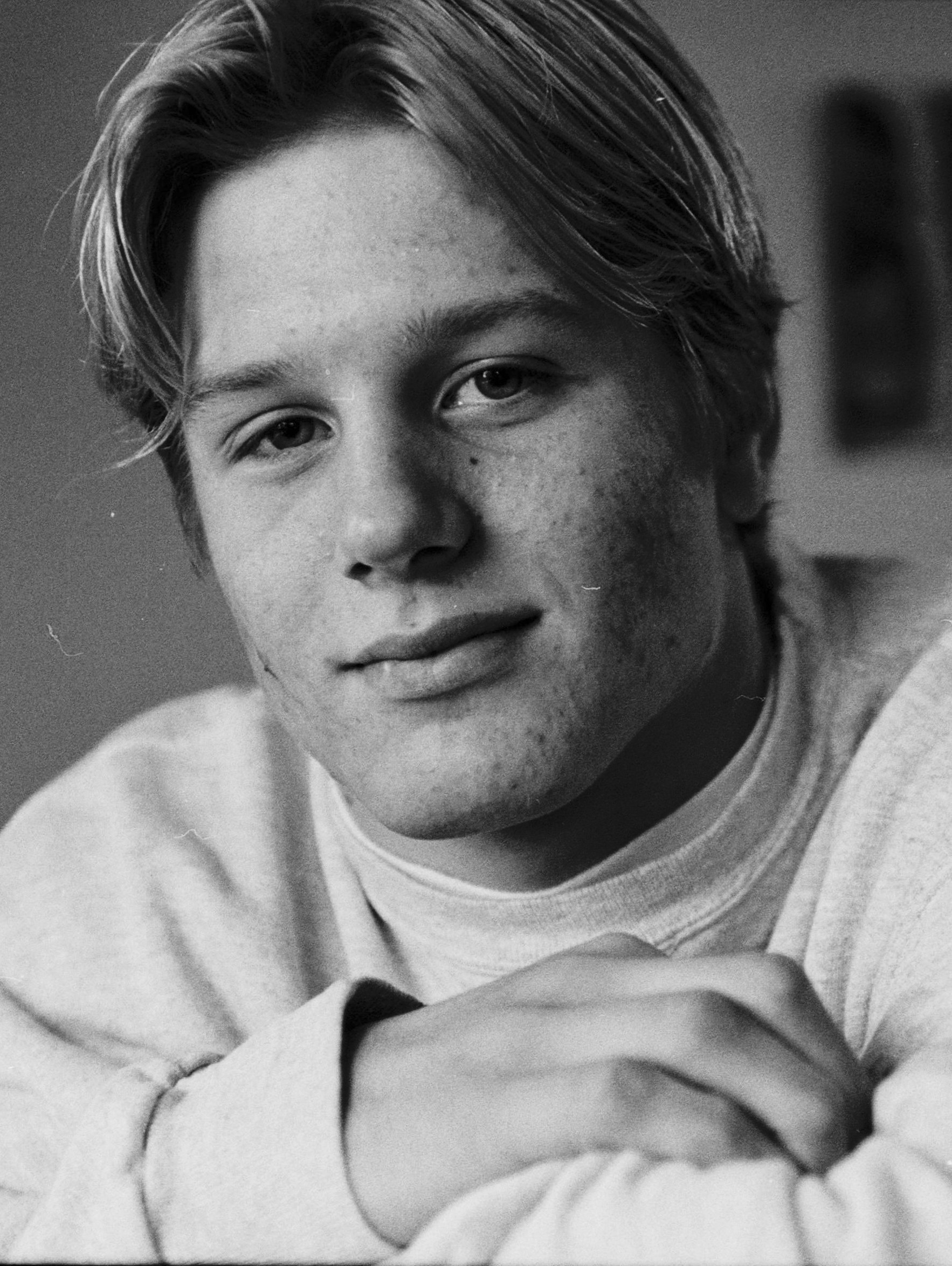

Personal information
- Born: 4 May 1979 (age 47)
- Occupation: Judoka

Sport
- Country: Netherlands (1994–2009); Belgium (2009–2012)
- Sport: Judo
- Weight class: ‍–‍90 kg, ‍–‍100 kg

Achievements and titles
- Olympic Games: 5th (2004)
- World Champ.: 5th (2011)
- European Champ.: (gold) (2002, 2010)
Medal record
Men's judo
Representing Belgium
European Championships
Gold medal – first place	2010 Vienna	‍–‍100 kg
IJF Grand Slam
Gold medal – first place	2010 Paris	‍–‍100 kg
Gold medal – first place	2010 Rio de Janeiro	‍–‍100 kg
Bronze medal – third place	2011 Rio de Janeiro	‍–‍100 kg
IJF Grand Prix
Bronze medal – third place	2010 Düsseldorf	‍–‍100 kg
Representing Netherlands
European Championships
Gold medal – first place	2002 Maribor	‍–‍100 kg
Silver medal – second place	2003 Düsseldorf	‍–‍100 kg
Bronze medal – third place	2001 Paris	‍–‍100 kg
IJF Grand Slam
Gold medal – first place	2009 Rio de Janeiro	‍–‍100 kg
IJF Grand Prix
Gold medal – first place	2009 Tunis	‍–‍100 kg
World Juniors Championships
Bronze medal – third place	1998 Cali	‍–‍90 kg

Profile at external databases
- IJF: 746, 946
- JudoInside.com: 36
- Updated on 15 November 2022

Elco van der Geest (born 4 May 1979 in Haarlem, North Holland) is a Dutch-born Belgian judoka. Throughout his career, Elco had competed for the Netherlands. In August 2009, Elco accepted the request to join the Belgian team. He achieved Belgian citizenship right before the 2009 World Judo Championships in Rotterdam.

van der Geest is the son of coach Cor van der Geest (nl) and a younger brother of Dennis who is also a judoka competing on the highest level.

According to International Judo Federation's World Ranking List, as of June 2010, van der Geest is rank at the number-two spot under Takamasa Anai of Japan.

van der Geest has twice competed at the Olympics, once for the Netherlands in 2004 losing to Ihar Makarau in the semi-finals, and then to Ariel Ze'evi in the bronze medal match, and then in 2012 where he lost to eventual gold medalist Tagir Khaibulaev in the first round.

== Achievements ==
Year	Tournament	Place	Weight class
2010	European Judo Championships	1st	Half heavyweight (100 kg)
2007	European Judo Championships	5th	Half heavyweight (100 kg)
2005	European Judo Championships	5th	Half heavyweight (100 kg)
2004	Olympic Games	5th	Half heavyweight (100 kg)
2003	European Judo Championships	2nd	Half heavyweight (100 kg)
2002	European Judo Championships	1st	Half heavyweight (100 kg)
2001	European Judo Championships	3rd	Half heavyweight (100 kg)
