= Judo at the 2014 Asian Games – Men's 100 kg =

Judo competition

Men's 100 kg at the 2014 Asian Games
- Venue: Dowon Gymnasium
- Date: 22 September 2014
- Competitors: 14 from 14 nations

Medalists
gold medal	Naidangiin Tüvshinbayar	Mongolia
silver medal	Maxim Rakov	Kazakhstan
bronze medal	Ramziddin Sayidov	Uzbekistan
bronze medal	Cho Gu-ham	South Korea

The men's 100 kilograms (Half heavyweight) competition at the 2014 Asian Games in Incheon was held on 22 September at the Dowon Gymnasium.

Naidangiin Tüvshinbayar from Mongolia won the gold medal.

== Schedule ==
All times are Korea Standard Time (UTC+09:00)

Date	Time	Event
Monday, 22 September 2014	14:00	Elimination round of 16
Monday, 22 September 2014	14:00	Quarterfinals
Monday, 22 September 2014	14:00	Semifinals
Monday, 22 September 2014	14:00	Final of repechage
Monday, 22 September 2014	19:00	Finals

== Results ==
=== Main bracket ===
Elimination round of 16
Shah Hussain Shah (PAK)	100
Mohammad Tawfiq Bakhshi (AFG)	000
Javad Mahjoub (IRI)	100
Yan Naing Soe (MYA)	000
Ramziddin Sayidov (UZB)	100
Xu Jie (CHN)	000
Bolot Toktogonov (KGZ)	100
Saud Al-Busiri (KUW)	000
Naidangiin Tüvshinbayar (MGL)	010
Dadakhon Kurbonaliev (TJK)	000
Yusuke Kumashiro (JPN)	000
Cho Gu-ham (KOR)	000

Quarterfinals
Maxim Rakov (KAZ)	100
Shah Hussain Shah (PAK)	000
Nuraly Ýalkapow (TKM)	000
Javad Mahjoub (IRI)	101
Ramziddin Sayidov (UZB)	110
Bolot Toktogonov (KGZ)	000
Naidangiin Tüvshinbayar (MGL)	010
Cho Gu-ham (KOR)	000

Semifinals
Maxim Rakov (KAZ)	100
Javad Mahjoub (IRI)	000
Ramziddin Sayidov (UZB)	010
Naidangiin Tüvshinbayar (MGL)	100

Gold medal contest
Maxim Rakov (KAZ)	000
Naidangiin Tüvshinbayar (MGL)	000

=== Repechage ===
Final of repechage
Shah Hussain Shah (PAK)	100
Nuraly Ýalkapow (TKM)	000
Bolot Toktogonov (KGZ)	010
Cho Gu-ham (KOR)	011

Bronze medal contests
Shah Hussain Shah (PAK)	000
Ramziddin Sayidov (UZB)	100
Cho Gu-ham (KOR)	111
Javad Mahjoub (IRI)	000
