= Leonardo Leite =

Brazilian judoka, jiu jitsu practitioner and mixed martial artist

- Born: March 23, 1978 (age 48); Rio de Janeiro, Brazil
- Other names: Leo
- Height: 6 ft 1 in (1.85 m)
- Weight: 185.5 lb (84.1 kg; 13.25 st)
- Division: Light Heavyweight; Middleweight
- Stance: Orthodox
- Fighting out of: Rio de Janeiro, Brazil
- Team: Rizzo RVT
- Years active: 2013–2022

Mixed martial arts record
- Total: 13
- Wins: 11
- By knockout: 3
- By submission: 3
- By decision: 5
- Losses: 2
- By decision: 2

Other information
- Mixed martial arts record from Sherdog
- Judo career
- Weight class: ‍–‍100 kg, Open

Judo achievements and titles
- World Champ.: R16 (2011)
- Pan American Champ.: (gold) (2001, 2001)
Medal record
Men's judo
Representing Brazil
Pan American Championships
Gold medal – first place	2001 Cordoba	Open
Gold medal – first place	2001 Cordoba	‍–‍100 kg
Silver medal – second place	2007 Montreal	‍–‍100 kg
Silver medal – second place	2010 San Salvador	‍–‍100 kg
Silver medal – second place	2010 San Salvador	Open
Silver medal – second place	2011 Guadalajara	‍–‍100 kg
Bronze medal – third place	2008 Miami	‍–‍100 kg

Profile at external judo databases
- IJF: 2076
- JudoInside.com: 57827

Leonardo "Leo" Leite (born March 23, 1978, in Rio de Janeiro, Brazil) is a retired Brazilian judoka, jiu jitsu practitioner, and mixed martial artist.

== Martial arts career ==
=== Judo ===
Leite began his career in judo in 1984 at the Federal Club under Omar Brazil. In 1988, at age 10, he transferred to the Clube de Regatas do Flamengo and began to participate in official competitions of the Judo Federation of Rio de Janeiro and the Brazilian Judo Confederation. In 1997, he achieved a place in the Brazilian junior national team, and in 1998 the first call for leading the Brazilian judo team, which he continued until 2012. Leite also works as a TV commentator for Judo and MMA events.

=== Jiu Jitsu ===
Parallel to his judo career, in 1993 he began his career in jiu-jitsu under the supervision of Alexandre Paiva, who coaches him still today. In 1999, Leite competed in the World Jiu-Jitsu Championship, Jiu Jitsu's most important competition, for the first time. He was a brown belt then and was expecting to compete in that division. However, his coach Paiva had other plans for him, and two weeks before the event he promoted him to black belt. Leite won the competition, winning in the final against a legend in the sport, Mario Sperry.

=== MMA ===
In 2013, Leite started his MMA career. Competing in his native Brazil, he amassed a record of 4–0 in his first year in the sport.

In 2014, Leite began fighting for Legacy Fighting Championship in the United States. He won the Light Heavyweight and Middleweight titles while with the promotion.

In 2017, Leite entered Bellator MMA with an undefeated 10–0 record. In his first fight for the promotion, he faced Phil Davis on November 3, 2017 at Bellator 186. He lost the fight by unanimous decision.

In his second fight for the promotion, Leite faced Chris Honeycutt on July 13, 2018 at Bellator 202. He again lost the fight by unanimous decision.

After almost 4 years away due to a nearly fatal case of tuberculosis and a leg injury that required a long stay in the hospital, Leite returned for his farewell bout at LFA 132 on May 13, 2022 against Patrick Quadros. He won the bout via unanimous decision and retired from MMA.

== Accomplishments ==
=== Judo ===
- Brazilian Olympic Team - Pekin 2008 and London 2012
- 3x Pan American Champion
- 2x South American Champion
- Three medals on the World Judo Championships Team competition
- 2x Second place on the Judo World Cup Championship
- 1x Third place on Judo World Cup Championship

=== Jiu Jitsu ===
- 8x Brazilian Champion
- 4x World Champion
- 2x World Cup Champion
- South American Champion heavy weight and open weight
- 6x Second place on Jiu-Jitsu World Championship

== Mixed martial arts record ==
Professional record breakdown
13 matches	11 wins	2 losses
By knockout	2	0
By submission	4	0
By decision	5	2

Res.	Record	Opponent	Method	Event	Date	Round	Time	Location	Notes
Win	11–2	Patrick Quadros	Decision (unanimous)	LFA 132	May 13, 2022	3	5:00	Rio de Janeiro, Brazil	Return to Light Heavyweight.
Loss	10–2	Chris Honeycutt	Decision (unanimous)	Bellator 202	July 13, 2018	3	5:00	Thackerville, Oklahoma, United States	
Loss	10–1	Phil Davis	Decision (unanimous)	Bellator 186	November 3, 2017	3	5:00	University Park, Pennsylvania, United States	Light Heavyweight bout.
Win	10–0	Moise Rimbon	Decision (majority)	Fight2Night 1	November 4, 2016	3	5:00	Rio de Janeiro, Brazil	
Win	9–0	Julio Juarez	Submission (rear-naked choke)	Iron FC 10: POP	September 3, 2016	1	2:23	Rio de Janeiro, Brazil	Won the Iron FC Light Heavyweight Championship.
Win	8–0	Matt Masterson	TKO (punches)	Final Fight Championship 25	June 10, 2016	3	1:13	Springfield, Massachusetts, US	
Win	7–0	Ryan Spann	Decision (unanimous)	Legacy Fighting Championship 48	November 13, 2015	5	5:00	Lake Charles, Louisiana USA	Defended the Legacy FC Middleweight Championship.
Win	6–0	Larry Crowe	TKO (knee & punches)	Legacy Fighting Championship 39	February 27, 2015	2	2:19	Houston, Texas USA	Middleweight debut; won the Legacy FC Middleweight Championship.
Win	5–0	Myron Dennis	Submission (rear naked choke)	Legacy Fighting Championship 35	September 26, 2014	4	4:50	Tulsa, Oklahoma USA	Won the Legacy FC Light Heavyweight Championship.
Win	4–0	Elias Mendonca	Submission (rear naked choke)	BC: Bitetti Combat 20	June 7, 2014	1	1:07	Rio de Janeiro, Brazil	
Win	3–0	Fabio Marongiu	Decision (unanimous)	WOCS: Watch Out Combat Show 31	November 1, 2013	3	5:00	Rio de Janeiro, Brazil	
Win	2–0	Diosman Nery de Jesus	Decision (unanimous)	BC: Bitetti Combat 17	September 6, 2013	3	5:00	Rio de Janeiro, Brazil	
Win	1–0	Alessandro Macedo	Submission (rear naked choke)	Fight Against Crack	June 23, 2013	1	3:25	Rio de Janeiro, Brazil	

== Submission grappling record ==
Result	Weight category	Opponent	Method	Event	Year	Stage
Win	100KG	Mario Sperry	Points: 4x0	BJJ World Championship	1999	Final
Loss	Absolute	Fernando Margarida	Points: 9x2	BJJ World Championship	2000	Semifinal
Win	Over 100KG	Aurelio Fernandes	Points	BJJ World Championship	2000	Final
Win	Over 100KG	Ronald Bauer	Points	BJJ World Championship	2003	Round1
Win	Over 100KG	Francisco Fernandes	N/A	BJJ World Championship	2003	4F
Win	Over 100KG	Marcio Corleta	Points: 4x2	BJJ World Championship	2003	Semifinal
Loss	Over 100KG	Fabricio Werdum	Points	BJJ World Championship	2003	Final
Win	Over 100KG	Aurelio Fernandes	Points: 2x0	BJJ World Cup	2003	Semifinal
Win	Over 100KG	Fabricio Werdum	N/A	BJJ World Cup	2003	Final
Win	Over 88KG	Marco Vilela	Armbar	Team Nationals	2004	Final
Win	Over 100KG	Adriano Pires	Points	BJJ World Cup	2005	Semifinal
Win	Over 100KG	Gabriel Napao	Points: 4x0	BJJ World Cup	2005	Final
Win	Over 100KG	Mauro Jorge	Submission	BJJ World Championship	2006	4F
Win	Over 100KG	Lucio Rodrigues	RNC	BJJ World Championship	2006	Semifinal
Loss	Over 100KG	Gabriel Gonzaga	Points: 4x0	BJJ World Championship	2006	Final
Win	Over 100KG	Asa Fuller	Choke	BJJ World Championship	2008	Round1
Loss	Over 100KG	Roger Gracie	Cross choke	BJJ World Championship	2008	Final
Loss	Over 99KG	Charles Cachoeira	Points	Capital Challenge	2008	Semifinal
Win	Over 99KG	Fabricio Werdum	Points	Capital Challenge	2008	3PLC
Loss	Absolute	Braulio Estima	Points	Capital Challenge	2008	Final
Loss	99KG	Leo Chocolate	Referee Decision	ADCC Trials	2009	Semifinal
Loss	Over 100KG	T. Gaia	Choke	Brasileiro	2012	Semifinal
Win	Over 100KG	Unknown	N/A	BJJ World Championship	2012	Round2
Win	Over 100KG	R. Evangelista	Points: 2x2, Adv	BJJ World Championship	2012	4F
Win	Over 100KG	Alexander Trans	Points: 2x0	BJJ World Championship	2012	Semifinal
Loss	Over 100KG	Marcus Almeida	Armbar	BJJ World Championship	2012	Final
Loss	94KG	Rodolfo Vieira	Armbar	Copa Podio	2013	SPF
Win	Absolute	Anderson Lima	N/A	BJJ World Championship	2013	RDS
Win	Absolute	DJ Jackson	Points	BJJ World Championship	2013	RDS
Win	Absolute	Andre Galvao	Referee Decision	BJJ World Championship	2013	4F
Loss	Absolute	Rodolfo Vieira	Armbar	BJJ World Championship	2013	Semifinal
Loss	100KG	Joao Rocha	Choke from back	BJJ World Championship	2013	4F
Loss	Absolute	Rodolfo Vieira	Points: 14x2	Copa Podio	2013	Semifinal
