= Yauhen Biadulin =

Belarusian judoka (born 1985)

Personal information
- Born: 1 September 1985 (age 40)
- Occupation: Judoka

Sport
- Country: Belarus
- Sport: Judo
- Weight class: ‍–‍100 kg

Achievements and titles
- Olympic Games: R16 (2012)
- World Champ.: R32 (2009)
- European Champ.: 5th (2009, 2010, 2012)
Medal record
Men's judo
Representing Belarus
IJF Grand Slam
Silver medal – second place	2009 Paris	‍–‍100 kg
IJF Grand Prix
Gold medal – first place	2010 Tunis	‍–‍100 kg
European U23 Championships
Bronze medal – third place	2006 Moscow	‍–‍90 kg
Bronze medal – third place	2007 Salzburg	‍–‍100 kg
Summer Universiade
Bronze medal – third place	2009 Belgrade	‍–‍100 kg

Profile at external databases
- IJF: 865
- JudoInside.com: 33178
- Updated on 28 November 2022

Yauhen Biadulin (born 1 September 1985 in Mogilev, Belarus) is a Belarusian judoka. He competed at the 2012 Summer Olympics in the ‍–‍100 kg event.

Biadulin has also competed in sambo and won a silver medal at the 2008 World Sambo Championships.
