= Thierry Fabre =

French judoka (born 1982)

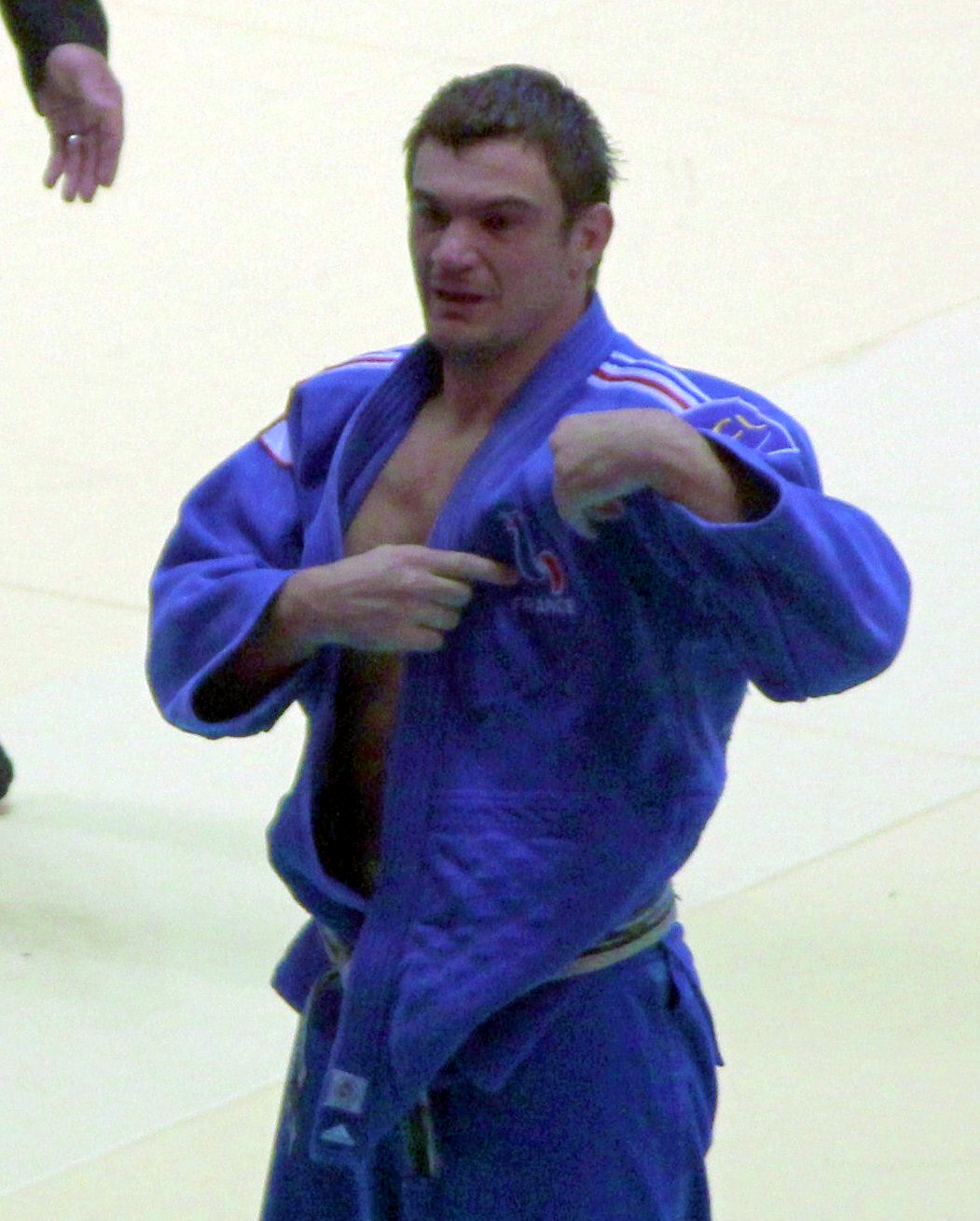
- Thierry Fabre in 2010

Personal information
- Born: 5 March 1982 (age 44) Montpellier, France
- Occupation: Judoka

Sport
- Country: France
- Sport: Judo
- Weight class: ‍–‍100 kg

Achievements and titles
- Olympic Games: R16 (2012)
- World Champ.: (bronze) (2010)
- European Champ.: R16 (2012)
Medal record
Men's judo
Representing France
World Championships
Bronze medal – third place	2010 Tokyo	‍–‍100 kg
European Championships
Silver medal – second place	2006 Belgrade	Men's team
IJF Grand Slam
Bronze medal – third place	2009 Rio de Janeiro	‍–‍100 kg
Bronze medal – third place	2010 Moscow	‍–‍100 kg
Bronze medal – third place	2011 Rio de Janeiro	‍–‍100 kg
European U23 Championships
Gold medal – first place	2004 Ljubljana	‍–‍90 kg

Profile at external databases
- IJF: 924
- JudoInside.com: 12712
- Updated on 25 July 2023

Thierry Fabre (born 5 March 1982 in Montpellier) is a French judoka. He competed at the 2012 Summer Olympics in the ‍–‍100 kg event and lost in the second round to Naidangiin Tüvshinbayar.

Fabre won a bronze medal at the 2010 World Championships in the ‍–‍100 kg category.
