= Javad Mahjoub =

Iranian judoka (born 1991)

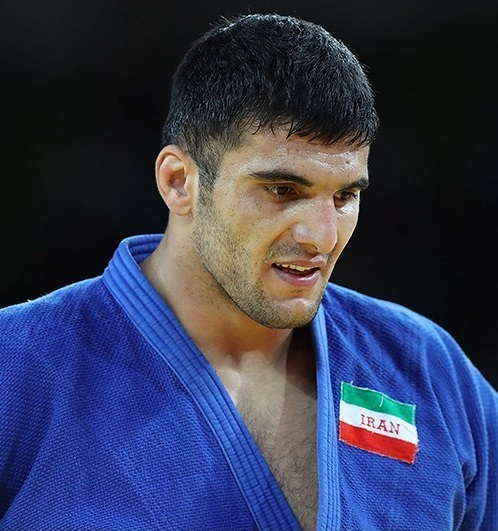
- Mahjoub in 2016
- Born: May 26, 1991 (age 35); Chenaran, Iran
- Height: 6 ft 1 in (185 cm)
- Weight: 265 lb (120 kg; 18 st 13 lb)
- Division: Heavyweight
- Style: Judo
- Fighting out of: Montreal, Quebec, Canada
- Team: Tristar Gym
- Years active: 2022–present

Mixed martial arts record
- Total: 6
- Wins: 5
- By knockout: 3
- By submission: 1
- By decision: 1
- Losses: 1
- By knockout: 1

Other information
- Mixed martial arts record from Sherdog
- Judo career
- Weight class: ‍–‍100 kg, +100 kg

Judo achievements and titles
- Olympic Games: R16 (2020)
- World Champ.: R32 (2011, 2013, 2018)
- Asian Champ.: (gold) (2013)
Medal record
Men's judo
Representing Iran
Asian Championships
Gold medal – first place	2013 Bangkok	‍–‍100 kg
Silver medal – second place	2012 Tashkent	‍–‍100 kg
IJF Grand Slam
Gold medal – first place	2013 Moscow	‍–‍100 kg
IJF Grand Prix
Silver medal – second place	2016 Tbilisi	‍–‍100 kg
Silver medal – second place	2018 Tunis	+100 kg
Silver medal – second place	2018 Tbilisi	+100 kg
Silver medal – second place	2018 Antalya	+100 kg
Bronze medal – third place	2014 Tbilisi	‍–‍100 kg
Bronze medal – third place	2014 Samsun	‍–‍100 kg
Bronze medal – third place	2015 Ulaanbaatar	‍–‍100 kg
Bronze medal – third place	2016 Düsseldorf	‍–‍100 kg
Bronze medal – third place	2016 Almaty	‍–‍100 kg
Bronze medal – third place	2017 The Hague	+100 kg
Asian Junior Championships
Gold medal – first place	2010 Bangkok	‍–‍100 kg
Bronze medal – third place	2009 Beirut	‍–‍90 kg

Profile at external judo databases
- IJF: 2684
- JudoInside.com: 66618
- Last updated on: 27 November 2022

Javad Mahjoub (Persian: جواد محجوب, born 26 May 1991) is an Iranian mixed martial artist and former judoka who currently competes in the Heavyweight division of the Ultimate Fighting Championship. Mahjoub was the 2013 Asian champion in his weight class.

== Background ==
Mahjoub was born in Chenaran, Iran. In 2017, Mahjoub started the process plan to move to Canada, because his family have plans to build a future life. In 2019, International Judo Federation imposed a four-year suspension on the Iranian Judo Federation following the incident where Iranian were instructed to avoid competing against Israeli athletes, which prevented him from competing on behalf of Iran. Mahjoub was competed in 2020 Summer Olympics as IOC Refugee Olympic Team. After Olympics, he began his MMA career due to no longer participate in competitions because of the sanctions against Iran.

== Judo career ==
He competed in judo for Iran at the following tournaments:

- 2010 Asian Games, 7th
- 2011 World Judo Championships
- 2012 Asian Judo Championships, Silver medal
- 2012 World Cup, Prague
- 2013 World Judo Championships
- 2013 Asian Judo Championships
- 2014 Asian Games
- 2016 Summer Olympics
- 2018 World Judo Championships
- 2018 Asian Games

Mahjoub was one of 29 members of the IOC Refugee Olympic Team to compete at 2020 Tokyo Olympics.

== Mixed martial arts career ==
=== Ultimate Fighting Championship ===
After gaining an undefeated record at 5–0 in his MMA career, Mahjoub was scheduled to make his UFC debut against Louie Sutherland on October 17, 2026, at UFC Fight Night 291. However, Sutherland pulled out and was replaced by Joel Faglier. Mahjoub lost the fight by technical knockout in the second round.

== Mixed martial arts record ==
Professional record breakdown
6 matches	5 wins	1 loss
By knockout	3	1
By submission	1	0
By decision	1	0

Res.	Record	Opponent	Method	Event	Date	Round	Time	Location	Notes
Loss	5–1	Joel Faglier	TKO (punches)	UFC Fight Night: Buckley vs. Malott	October 17, 2026	2	2:11	Edmonton, Alberta, Canada	
Win	5–0	Pietro Gentile de Oliveira	Submission (armbar)	Unified MMA 67	February 28, 2026	1	4:59	Calgary, Alberta, Canada	
Win	4–0	Gamzat Sirazhudinov	Decision (unanimous)	World X-Impact Federation: APEC 2025 Korea Summit Commemorative World MMA Competition	October 30, 2025	3	4:00	Seoul, South Korea	Catchweight (254 lb) bout.
Win	3–0	Rodrigo Duarte	TKO (punches)	Brothers Fight Champion 3	September 6, 2025	1	2:07	Araranguá, Brazil	Won the vacant BFC Heavyweight Championship.
Win	2–0	Pierre Patry	TKO (knee injury)	Samourai MMA 7	August 4, 2023	1	0:55	Sherbrooke, Quebec, Canada	
Win	1–0	Jesus Navarette	TKO (punches)	New Era Promotion: Soiree de Combat Fight Night 2	November 5, 2022	1	1:45	Saint-Hyacinthe, Quebec, Canada	Heavyweight debut.

== See also ==
- Iran at the 2010 Asian Games § Judo
- Iran at the 2014 Asian Games § Judo
- Iran at the 2016 Summer Olympics § Judo
- Iran at the 2018 Asian Games § Judo
- Refugee Olympic Team at the 2020 Summer Olympics § Judo
