= Ivan Remarenco =

Emirati judoka (born 1988)

Personal information
- Nationality: Emirati
- Born: 7 August 1988 (age 37) Goleni, Moldavian SSR, Soviet Union
- Occupation: Judoka

Sport
- Country: United Arab Emirates
- Sport: Judo
- Weight class: –90 kg, –100 kg

Achievements and titles
- Olympic Games: R32 (2012, 2016, 2020)
- World Champ.: (bronze) (2014)
- Asian Champ.: 5th (2018)
Medal record
Men's judo
Representing United Arab Emirates
World Championships
Bronze medal – third place	2014 Chelyabinsk	‍–‍100 kg
IJF Grand Prix
Silver medal – second place	2014 Tbilisi	‍–‍100 kg
Islamic Solidarity Games
Bronze medal – third place	2017 Baku	‍–‍100 kg
Men's sambo
Representing Moldova
World Combat Games
Bronze medal – third place	2010 Beijing	‍–‍90 kg

Profile at external databases
- IJF: 12582
- JudoInside.com: 47804
- Updated on 4 July 2023

Ivan Remarenco (born 7 August 1988 in Goleni, Moldova) is a Moldovan born-Emirati judoka. He competed at the 2012 Summer Olympics for Moldova in the -90 kg event. He moved up in weight category to -100 kg. He represented the United Arab Emirates at the 2014 World Judo Championships and won a bronze medal. He again represented the UAE at the 2016 Summer Olympics.
