= Shah Hussain Shah =

Pakistani judoka (born 1993)

Personal information
- Born: 8 June 1993 (age 33) London, England
- Occupation: Judoka
- Relative: Hussain Shah (father)

Sport
- Sport: Judo
Medal record
Men's judo
Representing Pakistan
Asian Championships
Bronze medal – third place	2013 Bangkok	100kg
Bronze medal – third place	2015 Kuwait	100kg
Commonwealth Games
Silver medal – second place	2014 Glasgow	100kg
Bronze medal – third place	2022 Birmingham	90kg
South Asian Games
Gold medal – first place	2016 Guwahati	100kg
Gold medal – first place	2019 Kathmandu	100kg

Profile at external databases
- IJF: 6653
- JudoInside.com: 92984

Shah Hussain Shah (8 June 1993) is a Pakistani judoka. He is the first Pakistani judoka to qualify for the Olympic Games, representing Pakistan at both the 2016 and 2020 Olympics.

== Career ==
Shah won two bronze medals at the Asian Judo Championships and two gold medals at the South Asian Games.

At the 2014 Commonwealth Games in Glasgow, Shah narrowly lost to Scotland's Euan Burton in the men's 100 kg finals, securing a silver medal.

Shah made history by becoming the first judoka from the country to qualify for the Olympic Games, representing Pakistan at both the 2016 Rio Olympics and the 2020 Tokyo Olympics, where he finished 16th and 17th respectively in the men's 100 kg event.

He competed for Pakistan at the 2010, 2014 and 2018 Asian Games, though an injury prevented him from participating in the 2022 edition. He also featured for the country at the 2021 Islamic Solidarity Games.

Shah grabbed Pakistan their first medal at the 2022 Commonwealth Games after defeating South Africa's Thomas-Laszlo Breytenbach to win the bronze medal fight. He was eliminated in the Round of 16 of the men's +100 kg judo event at the 2026 Commonwealth Games after losing to Canada's Bessong.

== Personal life ==
Born in London, Shah is the son of former Pakistani amateur boxer, Hussain Shah, who won the country's first and only Olympic boxing medal, a bronze at the 1988 Seoul Olympics.

He is based in Tokyo, Japan.

Olympic Games
Preceded by Sohail Abbas	Flagbearer for Pakistan; Rio de Janeiro 2016	Succeeded by Muhammad Khalil Akhtar; Mahoor Shahzad
