= Hwang Hee-tae =

South Korean judoka (born 1978)

Personal information
- Born: 12 June 1978 (age 48)
- Occupation: Judoka

Korean name
- Hangul: 황희태
- Hanja: 黄禧太
- RR: Hwang Huitae
- MR: Hwang Hŭit'ae

Sport
- Country: South Korea
- Sport: Judo
- Weight class: ‍–‍90 kg, ‍–‍100 kg

Achievements and titles
- Olympic Games: 5th (2004, 2012)
- World Champ.: (gold) (2003)
- Asian Champ.: (gold) (2006, 2010)
Medal record
Men's judo
Representing South Korea
World Championships
Gold medal – first place	2003 Osaka	‍–‍90 kg
Asian Games
Gold medal – first place	2006 Doha	‍–‍90 kg
Gold medal – first place	2010 Guangzhou	‍–‍100 kg
Asian Championships
Silver medal – second place	2009 Taipei	‍–‍100 kg
Silver medal – second place	2011 Abu Dhabi	‍–‍100 kg
World Masters
Silver medal – second place	2010 Suwon	‍–‍100 kg
IJF Grand Slam
Gold medal – first place	2009 Moscow	‍–‍100 kg
Gold medal – first place	2009 Tokyo	‍–‍100 kg
Silver medal – second place	2011 Tokyo	‍–‍100 kg
Bronze medal – third place	2011 Paris	‍–‍100 kg
IJF Grand Prix
Gold medal – first place	2011 Qingdao	‍–‍100 kg
Silver medal – second place	2012 Düsseldorf	‍–‍100 kg

Profile at external databases
- IJF: 1980
- JudoInside.com: 19689
- Updated on 19 November 2022

Hwang Hee-Tae (born 12 June 1978, in Sinan County, Jeollanam-do) is a male South Korean Judoka.

== Career ==
Hwang won a gold medal in the men's ‍–‍90 kg division at the 2003 World Judo Championships in Osaka, Japan, by defeating the 2004 Olympic champion Zurab Zviadauri from Georgia in the final. Hwang also won a gold medal at the Doha Asian Games in 2006.

At the Olympics, Hwang competed in the ‍–‍90 kg division in 2004, losing to Hiroshi Izumi in the semi-finals and then to Khasanbi Taov in the bronze medal bout. In 2012, he competed in the ‍–‍100 kg division, where he again reached the semi-final, this time losing Naidangiin Tüvshinbayar. He then lost to Henk Grol in the bronze medal bout.
