= Nobuyoshi Higashi =

Martial arts school founder

Personal information
- Born: 1938 (age 87–88) Japan
- Occupation: Judoka

Sport
- Sport: Tomiki Aikido, judo
- Rank: 10th Dan Black belt in jujutsu 9th Dan Black belt in judo 7th Dan Black belt in aikido 7th Dan Black belt in karate
- Club: Kokushi Budo Institute

Nobuyoshi Higashi (born 1938) is a Japanese American teacher of Tomiki Aikido, karate, and judo, and the founder of Kokushi-ryu jujutsu. He is a 10th dan in jujutsu, 9th dan in judo, 7th dan in aikido, and 7th dan in karate. His style of aikido includes defenses against knives.

== Personal life ==
He was a staff member at Kokushikan University in 1960 and later served as an exchange professor in the US. He established the American Tomiki Aikido Alliance in 1976. He became a professor at Stony Brook University. His son Shintaro Higashi is a world-class competitor and national champion in judo.

== Martial arts ==
Higashi arrived in the United States in 1964 in an effort to teach Judo and Tomiki Aikido in the United States. He runs the Kokushi Budo Institute, located in the basement of the New York Buddhist Church. The school is a branch of Kokushikan University, and was started in 1963. He is the founder of Kokushi-ryu jujutsu, which he founded in 1965.

== Books and DVDs ==
The school is a registered school with USA Judo and Team USA.

Higashi is the author of a number of books, including Koryu Aikido (1999), Kokushi-Ryu Jujutsu (1995), Aikido: Tradition and New Tomiki Free Fighting Method (1989), Basic Judo (1984), Karate-Do (1983). Additionally, he authored the DVDs Professor Nobuyoshi Higashi - Judo Grappling Series #1 and #2.
