= Soyib Kurbonov =

Uzbekistani judoka (born 1988)

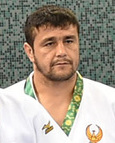

Personal information
- Born: 3 February 1988 (age 38) Uzbek SSR, Soviet Union
- Occupation: Judoka

Sport
- Country: Uzbekistan
- Sport: Judo
- Weight class: ‍–‍100 kg

Achievements and titles
- Olympic Games: R64 (2016)
- World Champ.: 5th (2013)
- Asian Champ.: (silver) (2016)
Medal record
Men's judo
Representing Uzbekistan
Asian Games
Bronze medal – third place	2014 Incheon	Men's team
Asian Championships
Silver medal – second place	2016 Tashkent	‍–‍100 kg
IJF Grand Slam
Bronze medal – third place	2014 Baku	‍–‍100 kg
IJF Grand Prix
Gold medal – first place	2013 Tashkent	‍–‍100 kg
Gold medal – first place	2016 Tashkent	‍–‍100 kg
Silver medal – second place	2016 Budapest	‍–‍100 kg
Bronze medal – third place	2013 Abu Dhabi	‍–‍100 kg
Bronze medal – third place	2015 Tashkent	‍–‍100 kg
Bronze medal – third place	2016 Almaty	‍–‍100 kg
Summer Universiade
Bronze medal – third place	2013 Kazan	‍–‍100 kg

Profile at external databases
- IJF: 13562
- JudoInside.com: 24276
- Updated on 27 November 2022

Soyib Kurbonov (born 3 February 1988) is an Uzbekistani judoka. He competed at the 2016 Summer Olympics in the men's 100 kg event, in which he was eliminated in the first round by Artem Bloshenko.
