= Elkhan Mammadov (judoka) =

Azerbaijani judoka (born 1982)

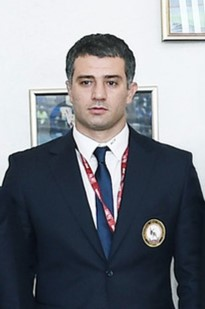

Personal information
- Nationality: Azerbaijani
- Born: 26 February 1982 (age 44)
- Occupation: Judoka

Sport
- Country: Azerbaijan
- Sport: Judo
- Weight class: –90 kg / –100 kg

Achievements and titles
- Olympic Games: 9th (2008)
- World Champ.: (gold) (2013)
- European Champ.: (gold) (2017)
Medal record
Men's judo
Representing Azerbaijan
World Championships
Gold medal – first place	2013 Rio de Janeiro	‍–‍100 kg
Bronze medal – third place	2010 Tokyo	‍–‍90 kg
European Championships
Gold medal – first place	2017 Warsaw	‍–‍100 kg
Silver medal – second place	2008 Lisbon	‍–‍90 kg
Bronze medal – third place	2009 Tbilisi	‍–‍90 kg
Bronze medal – third place	2010 Vienna	‍–‍90 kg
Bronze medal – third place	2016 Kazan	Men's team
World Masters
Gold medal – first place	2011 Baku	‍–‍90 kg
Gold medal – first place	2013 Tyumen	‍–‍100 kg
Bronze medal – third place	2017 Saint Petersburg	‍–‍100 kg
IJF Grand Slam
Gold medal – first place	2013 Baku	‍–‍100 kg
Gold medal – first place	2016 Abu Dhabi	‍–‍100 kg
Silver medal – second place	2014 Baku	‍–‍100 kg
Bronze medal – third place	2017 Baku	‍–‍100 kg
IJF Grand Prix
Gold medal – first place	2012 Baku	‍–‍100 kg
Gold medal – first place	2016 Almaty	‍–‍100 kg
Silver medal – second place	2010 Tunis	‍–‍90 kg
Bronze medal – third place	2009 Hamburg	‍–‍90 kg
Bronze medal – third place	2009 Abu Dhabi	‍–‍90 kg
Bronze medal – third place	2011 Baku	‍–‍90 kg
Bronze medal – third place	2015 Qingdao	‍–‍100 kg
Bronze medal – third place	2016 Havana	‍–‍100 kg
Bronze medal – third place	2017 Antalya	‍–‍100 kg
European U23 Championships
Bronze medal – third place	2004 Ljubljana	‍–‍81 kg
Islamic Solidarity Games
Gold medal – first place	2017 Baku	–100 kg
Gold medal – first place	2017 Baku	Men's team

Profile at external databases
- IJF: 24
- JudoInside.com: 38310
- Updated on 5 July 2023

Elkhan Mammadov (born 26 February 1982, Baku, Azerbaijani SSR, USSR) is an Azerbaijani retired judoka.

At the 2008 Summer Olympics Mammadov was eliminated in the quarterfinals of the 90 kg competition after losing to the eventual gold medalist Irakli Tsirekidze. At the 2012 Summer Olympics he was again defeated by the eventual champion, Song Dae-Nam, this time in the second round.

Mammadov won the gold medal in 2013 at the World Championships held in Rio de Janeiro, defeating Henk Grol, from Netherlands, during the ‍–‍100 kg category final.

== Achievements ==
Year	Tournament	Place	Weight class
2014	European Judo Championships	7th	Half-heavyweight (−100 kg)
2013	World Judo Championships	1st	Half-heavyweight (−100 kg)
2013	World Masters	1st	Half-heavyweight (−100 kg)
2011	World Masters	1st	Middleweight (−90 kg)
2010	World Judo Championships	3rd	Middleweight (−90 kg)
2010	European Judo Championships	3rd	Middleweight (−90 kg)
2009	European Judo Championships	3rd	Middleweight (−90 kg)
2008	European Judo Championships	2nd	Middleweight (−90 kg)
2007	World Judo Championships	7th	Middleweight (−90 kg)
