= Teerawat Homklin =

Thai judoka

Personal information
- Born: 13 October 1987 (age 37)
- Occupation: Judoka

Sport
- Sport: Judo

Teerawat Homklin (Thai: ธีรวัฒน์ หอมกลิ่น; born 13 October 1987 in Bangkok, Thailand) is a Thai judoka. He competed at the 2012 Summer Olympics in the -100 kg event.
