= Takamasa Anai =

Japanese judoka (born 1984)

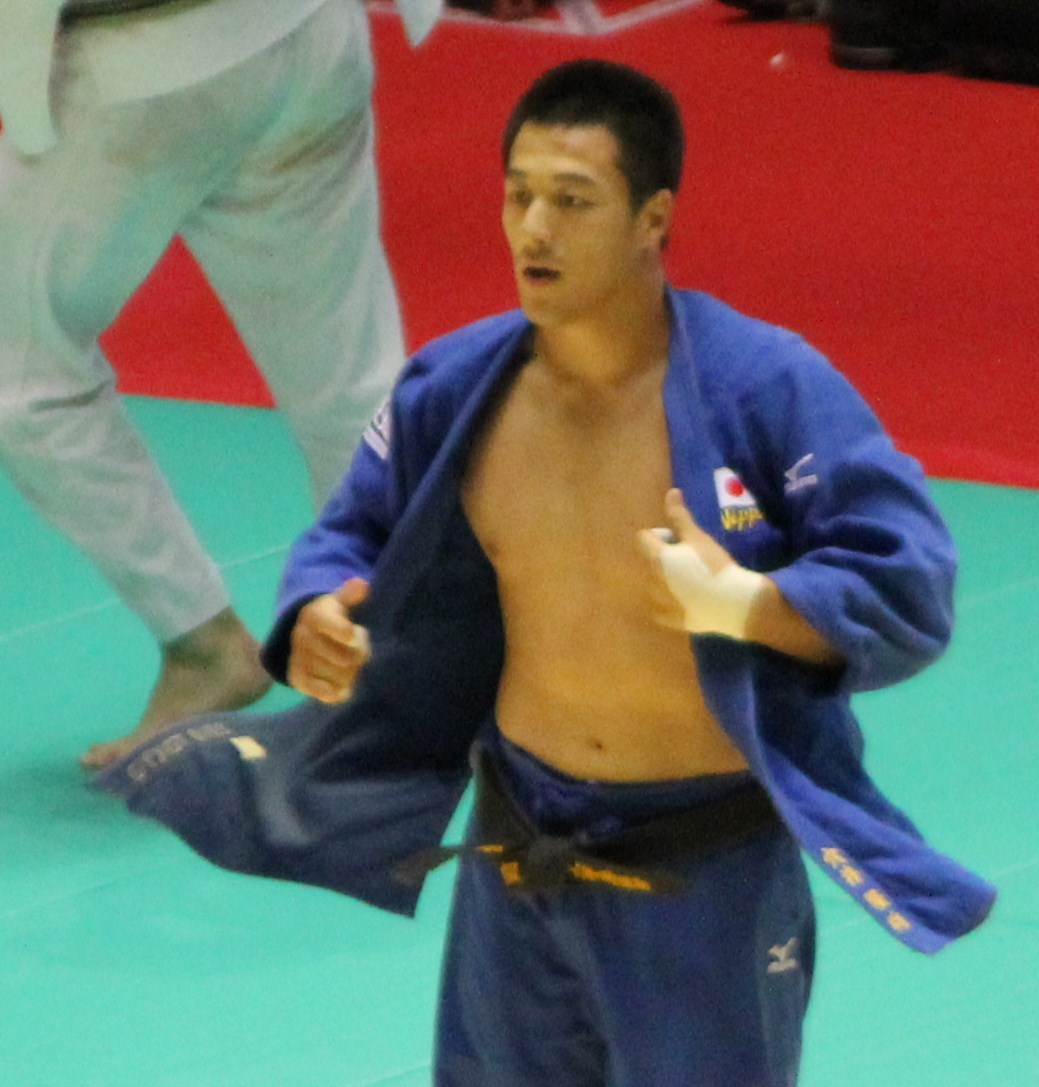
- Takamasa Anai in 2010

Personal information
- Born: 5 August 1984 (age 41) Ōita, Ōita, Japan
- Occupation: Judoka

Sport
- Country: Japan
- Sport: Judo
- Weight class: ‍–‍100 kg

Achievements and titles
- Olympic Games: R16 (2012)
- World Champ.: (2010)
- Asian Champ.: (gold) (2007)
Medal record
Men's judo
Representing Japan
World Championships
Gold medal – first place	2010 Tokyo	‍–‍100 kg
Bronze medal – third place	2009 Rotterdam	‍–‍100 kg
Asian Games
Silver medal – second place	2010 Guangzhou	‍–‍100 kg
Asian Championships
Gold medal – first place	2007 Kuwait City	‍–‍100 kg
Bronze medal – third place	2005 Tashkent	‍–‍100 kg
World Masters
Gold medal – first place	2010 Suwon	‍–‍100 kg
Bronze medal – third place	2012 Almaty	‍–‍100 kg
IJF Grand Slam
Gold medal – first place	2008 Tokyo	‍–‍100 kg
Gold medal – first place	2009 Paris	‍–‍100 kg
Gold medal – first place	2010 Tokyo	‍–‍100 kg
Gold medal – first place	2011 Rio de Janeiro	‍–‍100 kg
Silver medal – second place	2009 Tokyo	‍–‍100 kg
Silver medal – second place	2010 Rio de Janeiro	‍–‍100 kg
Bronze medal – third place	2010 Moscow	‍–‍100 kg
Bronze medal – third place	2011 Tokyo	‍–‍100 kg
IJF Grand Prix
Gold medal – first place	2009 Hamburg	‍–‍100 kg
Gold medal – first place	2010 Düsseldorf	‍–‍100 kg
World Juniors Championships
Gold medal – first place	2002 Jeju	‍–‍100 kg
Summer Universiade
Gold medal – first place	2007 Bangkok	‍–‍100 kg

Profile at external databases
- IJF: 26
- JudoInside.com: 16982
- Updated on 25 July 2023

Takamasa Anai (穴井 隆将, Anai Takamasa; born 5 August 1984 in Ōita, Ōita) is a Japanese judoka.

Anai began judo at the age of 5.

Anai is Coached by former world champion and olympic silver medalist Shinichi Shinohara. Anai won the All-Japan Championships and took a bronze medal at the 2009 World Championships. His greatest achievement to date is winning the 2010 World Championships in Tokyo.

In September 2012, Anai defeated 10 judo black belts in a row during the 50th anniversary of LA Tenri Judo Club, defeating 8-time US judo champion Tokuzo Takahashi in his final match.

Anai's main tournament throws are Harai Goshi, Uchi Mata and O soto gari.
