= Jevgeņijs Borodavko =

Latvian judoka (born 1986)

Personal information
- Born: 4 November 1986 (age 39)
- Occupation: Judoka

Sport
- Country: Latvia
- Sport: Judo
- Weight class: ‍–‍100 kg

Achievements and titles
- Olympic Games: R16 (2012)
- World Champ.: 7th (2009)
- European Champ.: (bronze) (2009, 2011, 2013)
Medal record
Men's judo
Representing Latvia
European Championships
Bronze medal – third place	2009 Tbilisi	‍–‍100 kg
Bronze medal – third place	2011 Istanbul	‍–‍100 kg
Bronze medal – third place	2013 Budapest	‍–‍100 kg
IJF Grand Slam
Silver medal – second place	2012 Paris	‍–‍100 kg
Silver medal – second place	2015 Tyumen	‍–‍100 kg
Bronze medal – third place	2009 Moscow	‍–‍100 kg
Bronze medal – third place	2011 Paris	‍–‍100 kg
Bronze medal – third place	2018 Abu Dhabi	‍–‍100 kg
IJF Grand Prix
Silver medal – second place	2010 Rotterdam	‍–‍100 kg
Bronze medal – third place	2011 Düsseldorf	‍–‍100 kg
Bronze medal – third place	2014 Zagreb	‍–‍100 kg
Bronze medal – third place	2015 Tbilisi	‍–‍100 kg
Bronze medal – third place	2017 Tbilisi	‍–‍100 kg
Bronze medal – third place	2018 Budapest	‍–‍100 kg
European U23 Championships
Gold medal – first place	2008 Zagreb	‍–‍90 kg
World Juniors Championships
Gold medal – first place	2004 Budapest	‍–‍90 kg
European Junior Championships
Gold medal – first place	2004 Sofia	‍–‍90 kg
Bronze medal – third place	2005 Zagreb	‍–‍90 kg

Profile at external databases
- IJF: 565
- JudoInside.com: 25774
- Updated on 14 November 2022

Jevgeņijs Borodavko (born 4 November 1986) is a Latvian judoka.

Born in Riga. By finishing 7th at the 2007 European Judo Championships, he qualified for the 2008 Summer Olympics, losing to Roberto Meloni in the first round of the middleweight (‍–‍90 kg) competition.

Borodavko also qualified for the 2012 Summer Olympics, having moved to the half-heavyweight (‍–‍100 kg) division. There he defeated Anthony Liu of American Samoa before losing to Dimitri Peters.

== Achievements ==
Year	Tournament	Place	Weight class
2013	European Judo Championships	3rd	Half heavyweight (100 kg)
2011	European Judo Championships	3rd	Half heavyweight (100 kg)
2009	European Judo Championships	3rd	Half heavyweight (100 kg)
2007	European Judo Championships	7th	Middleweight (90 kg)
2006	European Judo Championships	7th	Middleweight (90 kg)
