= Dimitri Peters =

German judoka (born 1984)

Personal information
- Nickname: Dima
- Born: 4 May 1984 (age 42) USSR
- Occupation: Judoka

Sport
- Country: Germany
- Sport: Judo
- Weight class: ‍–‍100 kg
- Rank: 2nd dan black belt

Achievements and titles
- Olympic Games: (bronze) (2012)
- World Champ.: (bronze) (2013, 2015)
- European Champ.: (bronze) (2006)
Medal record
Men's judo
Representing Germany
Olympic Games
Bronze medal – third place	2012 London	‍–‍100 kg
World Championships
Bronze medal – third place	2013 Rio de Janeiro	‍–‍100 kg
Bronze medal – third place	2015 Astana	‍–‍100 kg
European Championships
Bronze medal – third place	2006 Tampere	‍–‍100 kg
IJF Grand Slam
Gold medal – first place	2014 Abu Dhabi	‍–‍100 kg
Bronze medal – third place	2009 Paris	‍–‍100 kg
Bronze medal – third place	2010 Paris	‍–‍100 kg
Bronze medal – third place	2013 Moscow	‍–‍100 kg
Bronze medal – third place	2016 Baku	‍–‍100 kg
IJF Grand Prix
Gold medal – first place	2013 Abu Dhabi	‍–‍100 kg
Gold medal – first place	2015 Zagreb	‍–‍100 kg
Gold medal – first place	2016 Düsseldorf	‍–‍100 kg
Silver medal – second place	2009 Tunis	‍–‍100 kg
Silver medal – second place	2011 Düsseldorf	‍–‍100 kg
Silver medal – second place	2014 Astana	‍–‍100 kg
Silver medal – second place	2015 Tbilisi	‍–‍100 kg
Silver medal – second place	2015 Budapest	‍–‍100 kg
Bronze medal – third place	2014 Ulaanbaatar	‍–‍100 kg
Bronze medal – third place	2014 Qingdao	‍–‍100 kg
Bronze medal – third place	2014 Jeju	‍–‍100 kg
Bronze medal – third place	2015 Samsun	‍–‍100 kg
European U23 Championships
Gold medal – first place	2005 Kyiv	‍–‍100 kg

Profile at external databases
- IJF: 608
- JudoInside.com: 25715
- Updated on 25 May 2023

Dimitri Peters (born 4 May 1984) is a German judoka.

At the 2012 Summer Olympics, Peters lost to gold medallist Tagir Khaybulaev at the semi-final stage, and then won through the repechage, beating Ramziddin Sayidov in his bronze medal match.

== Achievements ==
Year	Tournament	Place	Weight class
2012	2012 London Olympics	3rd	−100 kg
2009	European Judo Championships	7th	Half heavyweight (100 kg)
2007	European Judo Championships	7th	Half heavyweight (100 kg)
2006	European Judo Championships	3rd	Half heavyweight (100 kg)
