= Mukhamadmurod Abdurakhmonov =

Tajikistani judoka (born 1986)

Personal information
- Born: 29 November 1986 (age 39)
- Occupation: Judoka

Sport
- Country: Tajikistan
- Sport: Judo
- Weight class: +100 kg

Achievements and titles
- Olympic Games: R32 (2016)
- World Champ.: R16 (2009)
- Asian Champ.: 5th (2010, 2014, 2015)
Medal record
Men's judo
Representing Tajikistan
IJF Grand Prix
| Bronze medal – third place | 2013 Tashkent | +100 kg |

Profile at external databases
- IJF: 4525
- JudoInside.com: 45972
- Updated on 26 December 2022

Mukhamadmurod Abdurakhmonov (born 29 November 1986) is a Tajikistani judoka. He competed at the 2016 Summer Olympics in the men's +100 kg event, in which he was eliminated in the first round by Alex García Mendoza.
