= Maxim Rakov =

Kazakh judoka (born 1986)

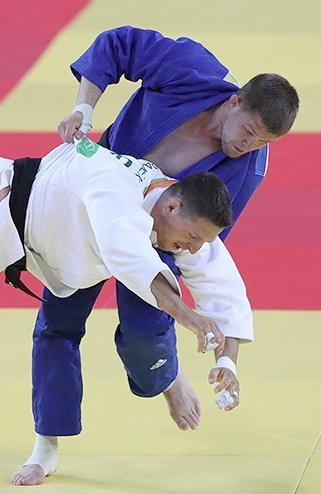
- Rakov (top) vs. Krpálek at the 2016 Olympics

Personal information
- Nationality: Kazakhstani
- Born: 7 February 1986 (age 40) Karaganda, Kazakh SSR, Soviet Union
- Occupation: Judoka
- Height: 181 cm (5 ft 11 in)

Sport
- Country: Kazakhstan
- Sport: Judo
- Weight class: ‍–‍90 kg, ‍–‍100 kg
- Coached by: Yermek Imambekov (national); Sergey Rakov (father)

Achievements and titles
- Olympic Games: R16 (2016)
- World Champ.: (gold) (2009)
- Asian Champ.: (gold) (2009, 2017)
Medal record
Men's judo
Representing Kazakhstan
World Championships
Gold medal – first place	2009 Rotterdam	‍–‍100 kg
Silver medal – second place	2011 Paris	‍–‍100 kg
Asian Games
Silver medal – second place	2006 Doha	‍–‍90 kg
Silver medal – second place	2014 Incheon	‍–‍100 kg
Silver medal – second place	2014 Incheon	Men's team
Bronze medal – third place	2010 Guangzhou	‍–‍100 kg
Asian Championships
Gold medal – first place	2009 Taipei	‍–‍100 kg
Gold medal – first place	2017 Hong Kong	‍–‍100 kg
Silver medal – second place	2015 Kuwait City	‍–‍100 kg
Bronze medal – third place	2007 Kuwait City	‍–‍90 kg
Bronze medal – third place	2016 Tashkent	‍–‍100 kg
World Masters
Gold medal – first place	2012 Almaty	‍–‍100 kg
Bronze medal – third place	2010 Suwon	‍–‍100 kg
Bronze medal – third place	2011 Baku	‍–‍100 kg
IJF Grand Slam
Gold medal – first place	2014 Baku	‍–‍100 kg
Bronze medal – third place	2010 Tokyo	‍–‍100 kg
Bronze medal – third place	2011 Moscow	‍–‍100 kg
Bronze medal – third place	2012 Tokyo	‍–‍100 kg
IJF Grand Prix
Gold medal – first place	2011 Düsseldorf	‍–‍100 kg
Gold medal – first place	2012 Düsseldorf	‍–‍100 kg
Gold medal – first place	2013 Almaty	‍–‍100 kg
Gold medal – first place	2014 Astana	‍–‍100 kg
Silver medal – second place	2011 Amsterdam	‍–‍100 kg
Silver medal – second place	2014 Düsseldorf	‍–‍100 kg
Silver medal – second place	2015 Qingdao	‍–‍100 kg
Silver medal – second place	2017 Antalya	‍–‍100 kg
World Juniors Championships
Bronze medal – third place	2002 Jeju	‍–‍81 kg
Asian Junior Championships
Silver medal – second place	2003 Macau	‍–‍90 kg

Profile at external databases
- IJF: 482
- JudoInside.com: 19421
- Updated on 17 July 2023

Maxim Rakov (born 7 February 1986) is a Kazakh judoka.

Rakov won the 2009 World Championships in the men's half-heavyweight (‍–‍100 kg) division, beating Henk Grol in the final. Rakov won the silver medal at the 2011 World Championships, losing to Tagir Khaybulaev in the final.

Previously, he had competed in the middleweight (‍–‍90 kg) category, winning a silver medal at the 2006 Asian Games. In 2007 he had a shoulder injury that required surgery. As a result, he missed the 2008 Olympics and considered to retire from sport. His father, who also served as his coach, encouraged him to continue. At the 2012 Games he was eliminated in the first bout. At the 2016 Rio Olympics he lost in the second bout to the eventual winner Lukáš Krpálek.
