= Ramziddin Sayidov =

Uzbekistani judoka (born 1982)

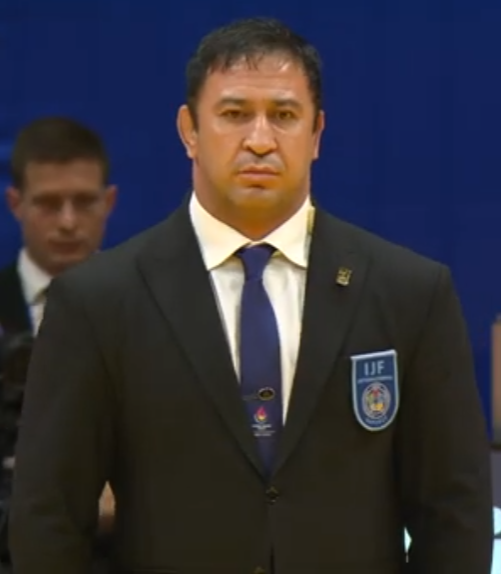
- Sayidov as a referee at the 2025 Summer World University Games

Personal information
- Born: 14 April 1982 (age 44)
- Occupation: Judoka
- Height: 190 cm (6 ft 3 in)

Sport
- Country: Uzbekistan
- Sport: Judo
- Weight class: ‍–‍81 kg, ‍–‍90 kg, ‍–‍100 kg

Achievements and titles
- Olympic Games: 5th (2012)
- World Champ.: 5th (2010)
- Asian Champ.: (gold) (2004, 2011, 2012)
Medal record
Men's judo
Representing Uzbekistan
Asian Games
Bronze medal – third place	2006 Doha	‍–‍90 kg
Bronze medal – third place	2010 Guangzhou	‍–‍100 kg
Bronze medal – third place	2014 Incheon	‍–‍100 kg
Asian Championships
Gold medal – first place	2004 Almaty	‍–‍81 kg
Gold medal – first place	2011 Abu Dhabi	‍–‍100 kg
Gold medal – first place	2012 Tashkent	‍–‍100 kg
Bronze medal – third place	2016 Tashkent	‍–‍100 kg
IJF Grand Slam
Gold medal – first place	2012 Moscow	‍–‍100 kg
Silver medal – second place	2013 Moscow	‍–‍100 kg
Bronze medal – third place	2011 Moscow	‍–‍100 kg
Bronze medal – third place	2012 Paris	‍–‍100 kg
Bronze medal – third place	2014 Baku	‍–‍100 kg
IJF Grand Prix
Gold medal – first place	2010 Abu Dhabi	‍–‍100 kg
Silver medal – second place	2011 Baku	‍–‍100 kg
Silver medal – second place	2012 Abu Dhabi	‍–‍100 kg
Silver medal – second place	2013 Tashkent	‍–‍100 kg
Bronze medal – third place	2014 Tashkent	‍–‍100 kg

Profile at external databases
- IJF: 2479
- JudoInside.com: 33029
- Updated on 27 November 2022

Ramziddin Beshimovich Sayidov (born 14 April 1982) is an Uzbekistani judoka.

Participating at the 2004 Olympics, Sayidov was stopped in the round of 32 by Siarhei Shundzikau of Belarus.

Sayidov won a bronze medal in the middleweight (90 kg) category of the 2006 Asian Games, having defeated Hossein Ghomi of Iran for the bronze medal.

At the 2012 Summer Olympics, Sayidov finished in 5th place, after losing to Tuvshinbayar Naidan in the quarter-finals and Dimitri Peters in the bronze medal match.

Sayidov currently resides in Bukhara.
