= Ramadan Darwish =

Egyptian judoka (born 1988)

Personal information
- Born: 29 January 1988 (age 38) Gharbia Governorate, Egypt
- Occupation: Judoka
- Height: 195 cm (6 ft 5 in)

Sport
- Country: Egypt
- Sport: Judo
- Weight class: ‍–‍100 kg
- Rank: 7th dan black belt

Achievements and titles
- Olympic Games: 7th (2016)
- World Champ.: (bronze) (2009)
- African Champ.: (gold) (2009, 2010, 2011, 2012, 2013, 2016, 2018, 2020)
Medal record
Men's judo
Representing Egypt
World Championships
Bronze medal – third place	2009 Rotterdam	‍–‍100 kg
African Games
Gold medal – first place	2019 Rabat	‍–‍100 kg
Silver medal – second place	2011 Maputo	‍–‍100 kg
African Championships
Gold medal – first place	2009 Mauritius	‍–‍100 kg
Gold medal – first place	2010 Yaounde	‍–‍100 kg
Gold medal – first place	2011 Dakar	‍–‍100 kg
Gold medal – first place	2012 Agadir	‍–‍100 kg
Gold medal – first place	2013 Maputo	‍–‍100 kg
Gold medal – first place	2016 Tunis	‍–‍100 kg
Gold medal – first place	2018 Tunis	‍–‍100 kg
Gold medal – first place	2020 Antananarivo	‍–‍100 kg
Silver medal – second place	2014 Port Louis	‍–‍100 kg
Silver medal – second place	2015 Libreville	‍–‍100 kg
Silver medal – second place	2017 Antananarivo	‍–‍100 kg
Silver medal – second place	2019 Cape Town	‍–‍100 kg
World Masters
Bronze medal – third place	2015 Rabat	‍–‍100 kg
Bronze medal – third place	2018 Guangzhou	‍–‍100 kg
IJF Grand Slam
Bronze medal – third place	2009 Moscow	‍–‍100 kg
Bronze medal – third place	2010 Rio de Janeiro	‍–‍100 kg
Bronze medal – third place	2012 Moscow	‍–‍100 kg
Bronze medal – third place	2015 Baku	‍–‍100 kg
IJF Grand Prix
Gold medal – first place	2009 Qingdao	‍–‍100 kg
Gold medal – first place	2014 Tashkent	‍–‍100 kg
Gold medal – first place	2015 Budapest	‍–‍100 kg
Gold medal – first place	2017 Tashkent	‍–‍100 kg
Gold medal – first place	2019 Montreal	‍–‍100 kg
Silver medal – second place	2009 Abu Dhabi	‍–‍100 kg
Silver medal – second place	2011 Abu Dhabi	‍–‍100 kg
Silver medal – second place	2015 Düsseldorf	‍–‍100 kg
Bronze medal – third place	2009 Tunis	‍–‍100 kg
Bronze medal – third place	2011 Amsterdam	‍–‍100 kg
Bronze medal – third place	2012 Düsseldorf	‍–‍100 kg
Bronze medal – third place	2014 Astana	‍–‍100 kg
Bronze medal – third place	2018 Tashkent	‍–‍100 kg
Mediterranean Games
Gold medal – first place	2009 Pescara	‍–‍100 kg
Gold medal – first place	2013 Mersin	‍–‍100 kg
Gold medal – first place	2018 Tarragona	‍–‍100 kg

Profile at external databases
- IJF: 891
- JudoInside.com: 55876
- Updated on 13 August 2023

Ramadan Darwish (Arabic: رمضان درويش; born 29 January 1988) is an Egyptian judoka.

== Career ==
Darwish won a bronze medal at the 2009 World Championships in Rotterdam -100 kg. In 2015 he also won the bronze medal at the World Masters in Rabat. He has been an African Champion six times. He also won Grand Prix in Qingdao (2009), Tashkent (2014 and Budapest in 2015. In 2016 he won gold at the Euro Open in Sofia. He competed at the 2012 Summer Olympics in the -100 kg event and was defeated in the first round, and at the 2016 Summer Olympics in the same event. He was more successful in 2016, reaching the quarterfinals by beating Dominic Dugasse in his first match and José Armenteros in the last 16 before losing to Elmar Gasimov. Because Gasimov reached the final, Darwish entered the repechage, where he lost to Karl-Richard Frey, ending up in the 7th place in Rio 2016.
