= Levan Zhorzholiani =

Georgian judoka (born 1988)

Personal information
- Born: 20 January 1988 (age 38)
- Occupation: Judoka

Sport
- Country: Georgia
- Sport: Judo
- Weight class: –100 kg

Achievements and titles
- Olympic Games: 5th (2008)
- World Champ.: 5th (2007)
- European Champ.: (silver) (2011, 2012)
Medal record
Men's judo
Representing Georgia
European Championships
Silver medal – second place	2011 Istanbul	–100 kg
Silver medal – second place	2012 Chelyabinsk	–100 kg
World Masters
Bronze medal – third place	2010 Suwon	–100 kg
IJF Grand Slam
Bronze medal – third place	2009 Tokyo	–100 kg
Bronze medal – third place	2010 Rio de Janeiro	–100 kg
IJF Grand Prix
Silver medal – second place	2011 Qingdao	–100 kg
Bronze medal – third place	2010 Tunis	–100 kg
European U23 Championships
Bronze medal – third place	2005 Kyiv	–90 kg

Profile at external databases
- IJF: 2136
- JudoInside.com: 34933
- Updated on 14 November 2022

Levan Zhorzholiani (Georgian: ლევან ჟორჟოლიანი; born 20 January 1988) is a Georgian judoka.

== Achievements ==
Year	Tournament	Place	Weight class
2007	World Judo Championships	5th	Half heavyweight (–100 kg)
2007	European Judo Championships	5th	Half heavyweight (–100 kg)
2011	European Judo Championships	2nd	Half heavyweight (–100 kg)
2012	European Judo Championships	2nd	Half heavyweight (–100 kg)
