= Judo at the 2012 Summer Olympics =

Coordinates: 51.5075°N 0.0297°E

Judo Judo at the Games of the XXX Olympiad
- Venue: ExCeL Exhibition Centre
- Location: London, United Kingdom
- Dates: 28 July – 3 August 2012
- Website: Official website

Competition at external databases
- Links: IJF • EJU • JudoInside

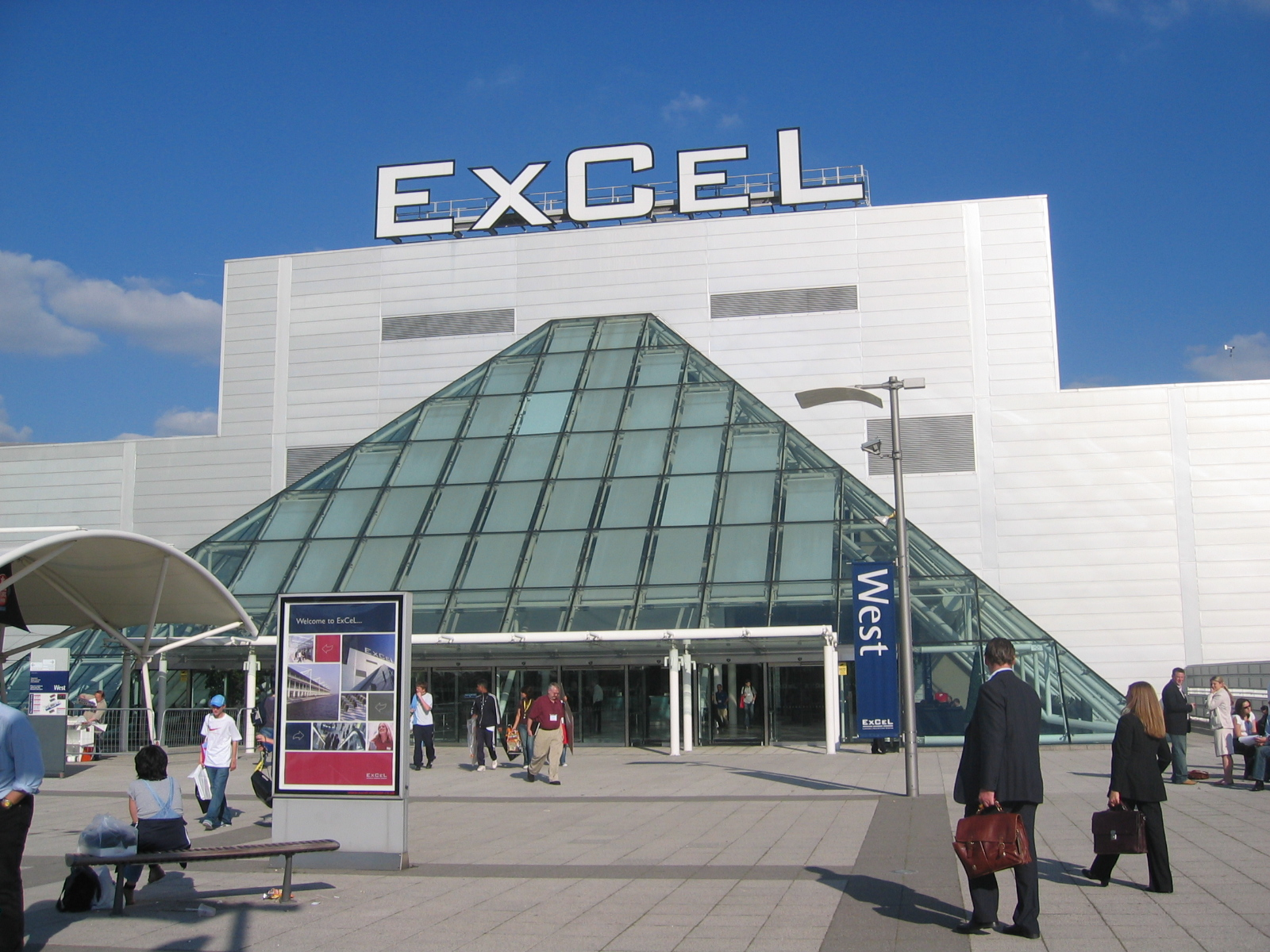
The host venue for judo was the ExCeL Exhibition Centre.

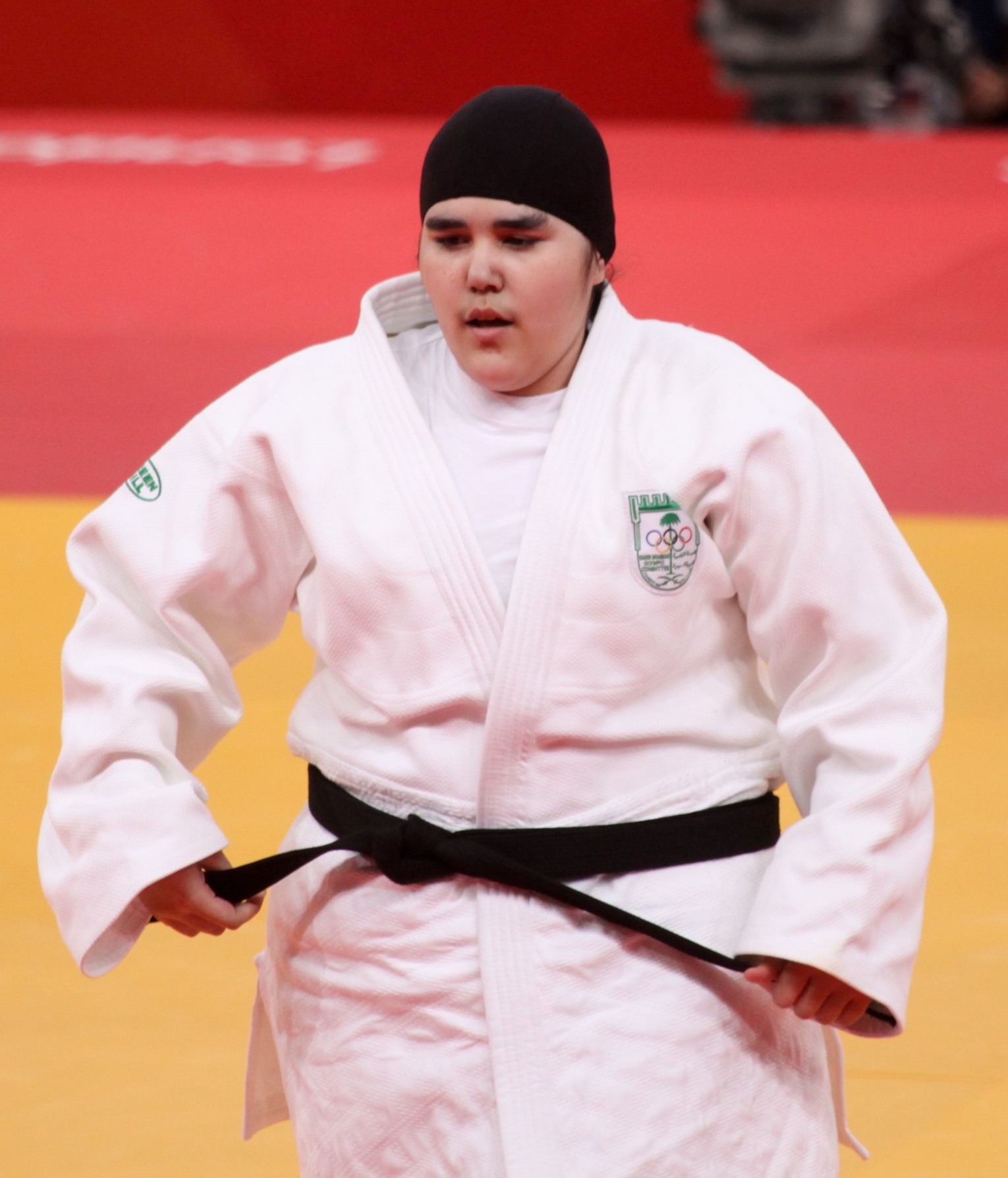
Wojdan Shaherkani became the first female competitor from Saudi Arabia to compete at an Olympic Games.

The judo competitions at the 2012 Olympic Games in London were held from 28 July to 3 August at the ExCeL Exhibition Centre.

== Qualification ==
Qualification was based on the world ranking list prepared by the International Judo Federation on 1 May 2012.

== Medal table ==
Russia topped the medal table with three golds and five medals overall.

* Host nation (Great Britain)

Rank	Nation	Gold	Silver	Bronze	Total
1	Russia	3	1	1	5
2	France	2	0	5	7
3	South Korea	2	0	1	3
4	Japan	1	3	3	7
5	Cuba	1	2	0	3
6	Brazil	1	0	3	4
7	United States	1	0	1	2
8	Georgia	1	0	0	1
8	North Korea	1	0	0	1
8	Slovenia	1	0	0	1
11	Germany	0	2	2	4
12	Romania	0	2	0	2
13	China	0	1	1	2
13	Great Britain*	0	1	1	2
13	Hungary	0	1	1	2
13	Mongolia	0	1	1	2
17	Netherlands	0	0	2	2
18	Belgium	0	0	1	1
18	Canada	0	0	1	1
18	Colombia	0	0	1	1
18	Greece	0	0	1	1
18	Italy	0	0	1	1
18	Uzbekistan	0	0	1	1
Totals (23 entries)		14	14	28	56

== Medal summary ==
=== Men's events ===
Games	Gold	Silver	Bronze
Extra-lightweight (60 kg)	Arsen Galstyan; Russia	Hiroaki Hiraoka; Japan	Felipe Kitadai; Brazil
Extra-lightweight (60 kg)	Arsen Galstyan; Russia	Hiroaki Hiraoka; Japan	Rishod Sobirov; Uzbekistan
Half-lightweight (66 kg)	Lasha Shavdatuashvili; Georgia	Miklós Ungvári; Hungary	Masashi Ebinuma; Japan
Half-lightweight (66 kg)	Lasha Shavdatuashvili; Georgia	Miklós Ungvári; Hungary	Cho Jun-ho; South Korea
Lightweight (73 kg)	Mansur Isaev; Russia	Riki Nakaya; Japan	Sainjargalyn Nyam-Ochir; Mongolia
Lightweight (73 kg)	Mansur Isaev; Russia	Riki Nakaya; Japan	Ugo Legrand; France
Half-middleweight (81 kg)	Kim Jae-bum; South Korea	Ole Bischof; Germany	Ivan Nifontov; Russia
Half-middleweight (81 kg)	Kim Jae-bum; South Korea	Ole Bischof; Germany	Antoine Valois-Fortier; Canada
Middleweight (90 kg)	Song Dae-nam; South Korea	Asley González; Cuba	Ilias Iliadis; Greece
Middleweight (90 kg)	Song Dae-nam; South Korea	Asley González; Cuba	Masashi Nishiyama; Japan
Half-heavyweight (100 kg)	Tagir Khaibulaev; Russia	Naidangiin Tüvshinbayar; Mongolia	Dimitri Peters; Germany
Half-heavyweight (100 kg)	Tagir Khaibulaev; Russia	Naidangiin Tüvshinbayar; Mongolia	Henk Grol; Netherlands
Heavyweight (+100 kg)	Teddy Riner; France	Aleksandr Mikhailine; Russia	Rafael Silva; Brazil
Heavyweight (+100 kg)	Teddy Riner; France	Aleksandr Mikhailine; Russia	Andreas Tölzer; Germany

=== Women's events ===
Games	Gold	Silver	Bronze
Extra-lightweight (48 kg)	Sarah Menezes; Brazil	Alina Dumitru; Romania	Éva Csernoviczki; Hungary
Extra-lightweight (48 kg)	Sarah Menezes; Brazil	Alina Dumitru; Romania	Charline Van Snick; Belgium
Half-lightweight (52 kg)	An Kum-ae; North Korea	Yanet Bermoy; Cuba	Rosalba Forciniti; Italy
Half-lightweight (52 kg)	An Kum-ae; North Korea	Yanet Bermoy; Cuba	Priscilla Gneto; France
Lightweight (57 kg)	Kaori Matsumoto; Japan	Corina Căprioriu; Romania	Marti Malloy; United States
Lightweight (57 kg)	Kaori Matsumoto; Japan	Corina Căprioriu; Romania	Automne Pavia; France
Half-middleweight (63 kg)	Urška Žolnir; Slovenia	Xu Lili; China	Yoshie Ueno; Japan
Half-middleweight (63 kg)	Urška Žolnir; Slovenia	Xu Lili; China	Gévrise Émane; France
Middleweight (70 kg)	Lucie Décosse; France	Kerstin Thiele; Germany	Yuri Alvear; Colombia
Middleweight (70 kg)	Lucie Décosse; France	Kerstin Thiele; Germany	Edith Bosch; Netherlands
Half-heavyweight (78 kg)	Kayla Harrison; United States	Gemma Gibbons; Great Britain	Audrey Tcheuméo; France
Half-heavyweight (78 kg)	Kayla Harrison; United States	Gemma Gibbons; Great Britain	Mayra Aguiar; Brazil
Heavyweight (+78 kg)	Idalys Ortiz; Cuba	Mika Sugimoto; Japan	Karina Bryant; Great Britain
Heavyweight (+78 kg)	Idalys Ortiz; Cuba	Mika Sugimoto; Japan	Tong Wen; China
