= Kyle Vashkulat =

American judoka (born 1990)

Personal information
- Born: Kirill Vashkulat; July 24, 1990 (age 35) Kiev, Ukrainian SSR, Soviet Union (now Kyiv, Ukraine)
- Occupation: Judoka
- Height: 185 cm (6 ft 1 in)
- Weight: 107 kg (236 lb)

Sport
- Sport: Judo
- Club: NYAC
Medal record
Representing United States
Men's judo
Pan American Judo Championships
Bronze medal – third place	2010 San Salvador	–100 kg
Bronze medal – third place	2011 Guadalajara	–100 kg

Profile at external databases
- JudoInside.com: 38920

Kyle Vashkulat (born Kirill Vashkulat, July 24, 1990) is a judoka from the United States.

== Biography ==
Kyle was born in the capital city of Ukraine, Kyiv. When he was 9 years old, he moved to the United States.

== Judo ==
His biggest success are two bronze medal from 2010 Pan American Judo Championships and 2011 Pan American Judo Championships. He ended his professional Judo carrier in 2013 after placing third at the Pan American Open in San Salvador. He qualified for the 2012 Summer Olympics in the Half-Heavyweight category where he placed 17th.

== Achievements ==
Year	Tournament	Place	Weight class
2010	Pan American Judo Championships	3rd	Half-Heavyweight (–100 kg)
2011	Pan American Judo Championships	3rd	Half-Heavyweight (–100 kg)
