= Tagir Khaybulaev =

Russian judoka (born 1984)

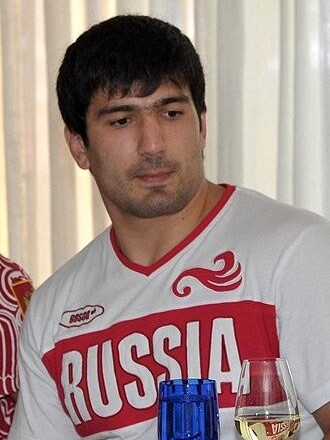
- Tagir Khaybulaev in 2012.

Personal information
- Native name: Тагир Камалудинович Хайбулаев (Russian)
- Full name: Tagir Kamaludinovich Khaybulaev
- Nationality: Russian
- Born: 24 July 1984 (age 41) Kizilyurt, Dagestan ASSR, Russian SFSR, Soviet Union
- Occupation: Judoka
- Height: 1.76 m (5 ft 9 in)

Sport
- Country: Russia
- Sport: Judo
- Weight class: –100 kg
- Club: Yavara Neva
- Coached by: Nikolai Petrov

Achievements and titles
- Olympic Games: (gold) (2012)
- World Champ.: (2011)
- European Champ.: (gold) (2009)
Medal record
Men's judo
Representing Russia
Olympic Games
Gold medal – first place	2012 London	‍–‍100 kg
World Championships
Gold medal – first place	2011 Paris	‍–‍100 kg
European Championships
Gold medal – first place	2009 Tbilisi	‍–‍100 kg
World Masters
Silver medal – second place	2011 Baku	‍–‍100 kg
IJF Grand Slam
Gold medal – first place	2015 Abu Dhabi	‍–‍100 kg
Silver medal – second place	2010 Moscow	‍–‍100 kg
Bronze medal – third place	2010 Tokyo	‍–‍100 kg
IJF Grand Prix
Gold medal – first place	2009 Abu Dhabi	‍–‍100 kg
Gold medal – first place	2014 Ulaanbaatar	‍–‍100 kg
Bronze medal – third place	2010 Abu Dhabi	‍–‍100 kg
Bronze medal – third place	2015 Jeju	‍–‍100 kg
European U23 Championships
Bronze medal – third place	2006 Moscow	‍–‍90 kg

Profile at external databases
- IJF: 363
- JudoInside.com: 37082
- Updated on 25 May 2023

Tagir Kamaludinovich Khaybulaev (Russian: Тагир Камалудинович Хайбуллаев, Avar: ТIагьир ХIайбулаев) (born 24 July 1984) is a Russian judoka. He currently represents Samara in international and domestic championships.

== 2012 Olympics ==
In the 2012 Summer Olympics, Tagir won his country's 3rd gold medal by defeating the defending champion Tuvshinbayar Naidan of Mongolia to win the men's under-100 kg Olympic judo title.

== Career ==
Tagir Khaibulaev currently lives in Samara, Russia. He attends the Dinamo Judo Academy.

In January 2017 he took a temporary pause in his career, but on 17 December that year he announced its completion.
