= Naidangiin Tüvshinbayar =

Mongolian judoka (born 1984)

Tuvshinbayar Naidan
Personal information
- Native name: Найдангийн Түвшинбаяр
- Nationality: Mongolia
- Born: 1 June 1984 (age 42) Saikhan, Bulgan, Mongolia
- Occupation: Judoka
- Height: 1.75 m (5 ft 9 in)
- Weight: 115 kg (254 lb)

Sport
- Country: Mongolia
- Sport: Judo
- Weight class: –100 kg, +100 kg

Achievements and titles
- Olympic Games: (gold) (2008)
- World Champ.: (bronze) (2017)
- Asian Champ.: (gold) (2014, 2016)
Medal record
Men's judo
Representing Mongolia
Olympic Games
Gold medal – first place	2008 Beijing	‍–‍100 kg
Silver medal – second place	2012 London	‍–‍100 kg
World Championships
Bronze medal – third place	2015 Astana	Men's team
Bronze medal – third place	2017 Budapest	+100 kg
Asian Games
Gold medal – first place	2014 Incheon	‍–‍100 kg
Asian Championships
Gold medal – first place	2016 Tashkent	‍–‍100 kg
Silver medal – second place	2007 Kuwait City	‍–‍100 kg
Bronze medal – third place	2008 Jeju	‍–‍100 kg
Bronze medal – third place	2011 Abu Dhabi	‍–‍100 kg
IJF Grand Slam
Gold medal – first place	2012 Paris	‍–‍100 kg
Silver medal – second place	2011 Paris	‍–‍100 kg
Bronze medal – third place	2013 Tokyo	‍–‍100 kg
IJF Grand Prix
Gold medal – first place	2013 Jeju	‍–‍100 kg
Gold medal – first place	2015 Qingdao	‍–‍100 kg
Gold medal – first place	2018 Hohhot	+100 kg
Silver medal – second place	2014 Jeju	‍–‍100 kg
Silver medal – second place	2019 Hohhot	+100 kg
Bronze medal – third place	2011 Abu Dhabi	‍–‍100 kg
Bronze medal – third place	2014 Düsseldorf	‍–‍100 kg

Profile at external databases
- IJF: 1544
- JudoInside.com: 43486
- Updated on 25 May 2023

Tuvshinbayar Naidan (Mongolian: Найдангийн Түвшинбаяр born 1 June 1984) is a Mongolian former professional judoka. He is the 2008 Olympic Champion, 2012 Olympic silver medalist, 2014 Asian games champion, 2017 World Championships bronze medalist, 2016 Asian Championships gold medalist, 2007 silver medalist and two-time (2008, 2011) bronze medalist in ‍–‍100 kg division. Naidan is serving a sixteen-year jail term since 2021 for killing fellow judoka and childhood friend Erdenebilegiin Enkhbat.

== Olympic career ==
At the 2006 Asian Games he finished in joint fifth place in both the heavyweight (‍–‍100 kg) division and the open weight division.

Tuvshinbayar won the men's 100 kg division's gold medal at the 2008 Olympic Games in Beijing. He was the first Mongolian ever to win a gold medal at the Olympics, by defeating Kazakhstani judoka Askhat Zhitkeyev a sode tsurikomi goshi with the leg grab (according to the old rules of judo, where it is allowed to double and single leg takedowns, with the legs grabbed by the hands, similar to a freestyle wrestling). On 14 August 2008, he was inducted as the state honoured athlete of Mongolia as well as a hero of labour.

At the 2012 Summer Olympics in London, Tuvshinbayar won a silver medal, becoming the first Olympic multimedalist from Mongolia. He won his silver medal despite suffering a serious injury in the semifinal bout. Also, at the 2017 World Championships, he won a bronze medal match against Guram Tushishwili from Georgia by earning an ippon after a series of techniques including a kata gatame roll and yoko shiho gatame, becoming both an Olympics and World Championships multimedalist.

== Mongolian wrestling career record ==
Naidangiin Tüvshinbayar
Year	Level	Participants	Rank	Wins	Earned title	Notes
2020	State	512	State Elephant	2		
2019	State	512	State Elephant	3		
2018	State	512	State Elephant	4		
2017	State	512	State Hawk	7	State Elephant	
2016	State	1024	State Hawk			Didn't participate.
2015	State	512	State Hawk	3		
2014	State	512	State Hawk	4		
2013	State	512	Lion of Aimag	6	State Hawk	
State Naadam Winner Won at least 5 rounds in State Naadam Aimag/Sum Naadam Promotion

== Assault and jailing ==
In April 2021, Tüvshinbayar was jailed for 20 days following a drunken assault on Erdenebilegiin Enkhbat, who was a childhood friend. Enkhbat died on 24 December 2021 from a brain injury related to the assault. Following Enkhbat's death, new charges were filed against Tüvshinbayar. On 9 June 2022, the Khan-Uul District Court sentenced Tuvshinbayar to 16 years in prison for the deadly assault.
