= 2022 World Judo Championships – Men's 100 kg =

Judo competition

Judo Men's 100 kg at the 2022 World Judo Championships
- Venue: Humo Ice Dome
- Location: Tashkent, Uzbekistan
- Date: 11 October
- Competitors: 41 from 34 nations
- Total prize money: €57,000

Medalists
gold medal	Muzaffarbek Turoboyev (1st title)	Uzbekistan
silver medal	Kyle Reyes	Canada
bronze medal	Michael Korrel	Netherlands
bronze medal	Zelym Kotsoiev	Azerbaijan

Competition at external databases
- Links: IJF • JudoInside

The Men's 100 kg event at the 2022 World Judo Championships was held at the Humo Ice Dome arena in Tashkent, Uzbekistan on 11 October 2022.

== Results ==
=== Finals ===
Semi-finals
(Azerbaijan) Zelym Kotsoiev	01
(Canada) Kyle Reyes	10
(Uzbekistan) Muzaffarbek Turoboyev	11
(Netherlands) Michael Korrel	00

Final
(Canada) Kyle Reyes	00
(Uzbekistan) Muzaffarbek Turoboyev	01

=== Repechage ===
Repechage
(Portugal) Jorge Fonseca	01
(Georgia (country)) Ilia Sulamanidze	10
(Canada) Shady El Nahas	00
(Belgium) Toma Nikiforov	10

Bronze medal
(Georgia (country)) Ilia Sulamanidze	00
(Netherlands) Michael Korrel	01
(Belgium) Toma Nikiforov	00
(Azerbaijan) Zelym Kotsoiev	01

=== Pool A ===
First round
(Netherlands) Simeon Catharina	00
(Japan) Kentaro Iida	10
(Kazakhstan) Nurlykhan Sharkhan	10
(South Korea) Won Jong-hoon	00

Round of 32
(Portugal) Jorge Fonseca	01
(Romania) Asley González	00
(Japan) Kentaro Iida	01
(Serbia) Bojan Došen	10
(Azerbaijan) Zelym Kotsoiev	10
(Switzerland) Daniel Eich	00
(Algeria) Mustapha Bouamar	00
(Kazakhstan) Nurlykhan Sharkhan	10

Round of 16
(Portugal) Jorge Fonseca	10
(Serbia) Bojan Došen	00
(Azerbaijan) Zelym Kotsoiev	10
(Kazakhstan) Nurlykhan Sharkhan	00

Quarter-finals
(Portugal) Jorge Fonseca	00
(Azerbaijan) Zelym Kotsoiev	11

=== Pool B ===
First round
(Hungary) Miklós Cirjenics	00
(Canada) Kyle Reyes	10
(Germany) Daniel Herbst	11
(Croatia) Marko Kumrić	01
Adnan Khankan	00
(France) Kenny Liveze	10

Round of 32
(Israel) Peter Paltchik	00
(Mongolia) Batkhuyagiin Gonchigsüren	11
(Slovakia) Benjamín Maťašeje	00
(Canada) Kyle Reyes	10
(Georgia (country)) Ilia Sulamanidze	11
(Germany) Daniel Herbst	00
(Turkey) Mert Şişmanlar	10
(France) Kenny Liveze	00

Round of 16
(Mongolia) Batkhuyagiin Gonchigsüren	00
(Canada) Kyle Reyes	10
(Georgia (country)) Ilia Sulamanidze	11
(Turkey) Mert Şişmanlar	00

Quarter-finals
(Canada) Kyle Reyes	10
(Georgia (country)) Ilia Sulamanidze	01

=== Pool C ===
First round
(Ivory Coast) Koffi Kobena	00
(Serbia) Aleksandar Kukolj	10
(Estonia) Grigori Minaškin	11
(Croatia) Zlatko Kumrić	01

Round of 32
(Canada) Shady El Nahas	11
(Serbia) Aleksandar Kukolj	01
(Tajikistan) Akobir Abubakri	00
(Spain) Nikoloz Sherazadishvili	10
(Georgia (country)) Varlam Liparteliani	10
(Estonia) Grigori Minaškin	00
(Uzbekistan) Muzaffarbek Turoboyev	10
(United States) L.A. Smith III	00

Round of 16
(Canada) Shady El Nahas	10
(Spain) Nikoloz Sherazadishvili	00
(Georgia (country)) Varlam Liparteliani	00
(Uzbekistan) Muzaffarbek Turoboyev	10

Quarter-finals
(Canada) Shady El Nahas	01
(Uzbekistan) Muzaffarbek Turoboyev	10

=== Pool D ===
First round
(Austria) Aaron Fara	10
(Denmark) Mathias Madsen	00
(Bulgaria) Boris Georgiev	00
(United Arab Emirates) Dzhafar Kostoev	10

Round of 32
(Netherlands) Michael Korrel	01
(Austria) Aaron Fara	00
(Kazakhstan) Islam Bozbayev	00
(Brazil) Rafael Buzacarini	10
(Belgium) Toma Nikiforov	10
(United Arab Emirates) Dzhafar Kostoev	01
(Hungary) Zsombor Vég	10
(Tunisia) Koussay Ben Ghares	00

Round of 16
(Netherlands) Michael Korrel	01
(Brazil) Rafael Buzacarini	00
(Belgium) Toma Nikiforov	01
(Hungary) Zsombor Vég	00

Quarter-finals
(Netherlands) Michael Korrel	10
(Belgium) Toma Nikiforov	00
