= Peter Paltchik =

Israeli judoka (born 1992)

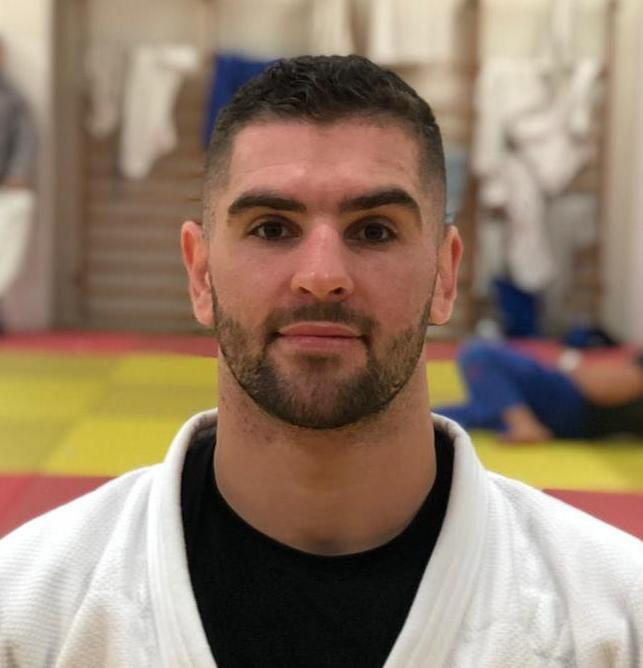
- Paltchik in 2019

Personal information
- Native name: פיטר פלצ׳יק
- Nationality: Israeli
- Born: 4 January 1992 (age 34) Yalta, Crimea, Ukraine
- Occupation: Judoka
- Height: 1.90 m (6 ft 3 in)
- Website: Official website

Sport
- Country: Israel
- Sport: Judo
- Weight class: ‍–‍100 kg
- Rank: 5th dan black belt
- Retired: 10 November 2025

Achievements and titles
- Olympic Games: (bronze) (2024)
- World Champ.: (bronze) (2023)
- European Champ.: (gold) (2020)
- Highest world ranking: 1^{st}
Medal record
Men's judo
Representing Israel
Olympic Games
Bronze medal – third place	2020 Tokyo	Mixed team
Bronze medal – third place	2024 Paris	‍–‍100 kg
World Championships
Bronze medal – third place	2022 Tashkent	Mixed team
Bronze medal – third place	2023 Doha	‍–‍100 kg
European Championships
Gold medal – first place	2020 Prague	‍–‍100 kg
Bronze medal – third place	2018 Tel Aviv	‍–‍100 kg
World Masters
Silver medal – second place	2023 Budapest	‍–‍100 kg
Bronze medal – third place	2021 Doha	‍–‍100 kg
Bronze medal – third place	2022 Jerusalem	‍–‍100 kg
IJF Grand Slam
Gold medal – first place	2018 Abu Dhabi	‍–‍100 kg
Gold medal – first place	2020 Paris	‍–‍100 kg
Silver medal – second place	2021 Tel Aviv	‍–‍100 kg
Silver medal – second place	2022 Paris	‍–‍100 kg
Bronze medal – third place	2017 Abu Dhabi	‍–‍100 kg
Bronze medal – third place	2019 Paris	‍–‍100 kg
Bronze medal – third place	2019 Ekaterinburg	‍–‍100 kg
Bronze medal – third place	2022 Tel Aviv	‍–‍100 kg
Bronze medal – third place	2022 Ulaanbaatar	‍–‍100 kg
Bronze medal – third place	2023 Paris	‍–‍100 kg
Bronze medal – third place	2024 Astana	‍–‍100 kg
IJF Grand Prix
Gold medal – first place	2017 Cancún	‍–‍100 kg
Gold medal – first place	2018 Tbilisi	‍–‍100 kg
Gold medal – first place	2018 The Hague	‍–‍100 kg
Gold medal – first place	2020 Tel Aviv	‍–‍100 kg
Bronze medal – third place	2018 Budapest	‍–‍100 kg
Bronze medal – third place	2019 Zagreb	‍–‍100 kg
European Junior Championships
Silver medal – second place	2011 Lommel	‍–‍90 kg
Men's Sambo
Summer Universiade
Silver medal – second place	2013 Kazan	100 kg

Profile at external databases
- IJF: 9718
- JudoInside.com: 51441
- Updated on 10 November 2025

Peter Paltchik (Hebrew: פיטר פלצ׳יק, romanized: Piter Palchik; Ukrainian: Петер Пальтчик, romanized: Peter Palchyk; born 4 January 1992) is a Ukrainian-born Israeli Olympic and former European champion retired judoka, competing in the under 100 kg weight category, of which he was the number 1 ranked judoka in the world. Paltchik won a bronze medal at the 2018 European Championships in Tel Aviv. In 2019 he won the Israeli championship in the +100 kg category. He then won the gold medal at the 2020 European Championships in Prague. Paltchik also won a bronze medal in the mixed team judo competition in the 2020 Summer Olympics. At the 2023 World Championships he won a bronze medal. Paltchik represented Israel at the 2024 Summer Olympics in Paris in judo in the men's 100 kg event and in the mixed team event, and was the flag bearer for his country, alongside swimmer Andrea Murez.

== Early life ==
Paltchik was born in 1992 in Yalta, Crimea (Ukraine). His father died of lung cancer when he was about three months old. As a 9-month-old baby, he immigrated to Israel with his 24-year-old mother Larisa and resided in the city of Rishon LeZion, Israel. About a year later, his maternal grandparents immigrated to Israel as well. He was born in a difficult 53–54 hour birth, as he was not in the correct position, as a sick baby at a weight of 5.1 kilograms (11 lb) with crooked and fractured bones and various health problems, and the doctor recommended his family let Paltchik practice sports. His grandfather sent him to practice judo when he was four years old at the "Samurai Club" in Rishon LeZion under the guidance of Pavel Musin.

During his childhood, Paltchik's mother went to the United States to work and send money back and stayed there until he was seven. During this time, Paltchik lived with his grandparents in Rishon LeZion. His mother works as a nurse in Sheba Medical Center in Ramat Gan, Israel. He attended the Yigal Alon High School, majoring in communication. He served as a logistics soldier at the Tzrifin base of the Israeli Air Force. He is a student in Ono Academic College.

== Judo career ==
At the age of 16, he joined the Israeli Judo Cadet Team. At the age of 17, he won the Israel cadet championship, Junior championship, and the U23 championship that season. At the age of 18 he joined the national senior judo team under the Israel national coach and former Olympic medalist Oren Samadja. He trains at the Wingate Institute, and trains every day, twice a day. He said: "I train as if I don’t have a medal. It’s never about the physical award. Instead, it is about what you can achieve and the challenge you can overcome."

=== 2011–14: Israeli champion ===
In September, Paltchik competed in the 2011 European Junior Championships in Lumel, Belgium, and won a silver medal in the ‍–‍90 kg weight category. In June 2012, Paltchik underwent a complicated surgery in the right knee following a rupture of the posterior cruciate ligament during routine training. Because of the surgery and the rehabilitation, his shift to the senior level was interrupted until 2014.

In January 2014, Peter returned to practice as part of the senior Israeli judo team. In February 2014 he won a bronze medal in the European Open in Oberwart, Austria. In September, he again won a bronze medal at the European Open in Tallinn, Estonia. He competed in the ‍–‍100 kg category in the Israeli championship that year, and won the gold medal.

=== 2015–17 ===
In 2015, Paltchik decided, together with the national team coach, to raise the weight category ‍–‍100 kg in order to improve his performance on the mat. In June, he participated in the 2015 European Games held in Baku, and was eliminated in the second round by Frenchman Cyrille Maret. In November, in the midst of the race to the 2016 Rio Olympic games, Paltchik took part in the 2015 Qingdao Grand Prix in China, and ripped the ligaments in his shoulder during a fight against the Mongolian Olympic champion, Naidangiin Tüvshinbayar. He had to undergo shoulder surgery and a long rehabilitation of 9 months, which resulted in him missing the 2016 Rio Olympics.

In Paltchik's return to judo in February 2017, he won a bronze medal at the European Cup competition in Rome, Italy. In March, he participated in the 2017 Baku Grand Slam and reached fifth place. At the 2017 European Championship held in Warsaw, Poland, in April, Paltchik reached seventh place. On June, a competition was held at the European Tour in Bucharest, Romania, where Paltchik won a bronze medal. Later that month, he won a gold medal in the 2017 Cancún Grand Prix in Mexico, after winning in the semifinals against the Brazilian former world champion, Luciano Correra, and beating Irish Benjamin Fletcher by a waza-ari. At the 2017 World Championships held in September in Budapest, Paltchik lost in the round-of-16 to Michael Korrel from the Netherlands who was ranked first in the world. In October, Paltchik won a bronze medal at the 2017 Abu Dhabi Grand Slam, after defeating Miklós Cirjenics from Hungary.

=== 2018–19: European championships bronze medal ===
In April, Paltchik won the gold medal in the 2018 Tbilisi Grand Prix in Georgia, when he defeated Merab Margiev of Russia in the final, after two minutes and a half. In the 2018 European Championship held in April in Tel Aviv, Paltchik won a bronze medal in the ‍–‍100 kg category. In the first round, he met Latvia's Jevgeņijs Borodavko. Two minutes from the start of the fight, Peter won a waza-ari, that eventually make him pass the first round. In the top-16, he met the Serbian Bojan Došen, and after four minutes without scoring, the battle went into a golden score, in which the Serbian took the third penalty and Paltchik went up to the quarterfinal. At that stage, Paltchik overcame Zelym Kotsoiev from Azerbaijan, when a minute and 13 seconds to the end of the fight, he managed to get a waza-ari. In the semifinal, Paltchik competed against French Cyrille Maret. After 2 minutes and 16 seconds from the start of the fight, Maret entered a choking exercise, and Peter fainted. Afterwards, Paltchik competed for the bronze medal, facing the Russian Niyaz Bilalov, and won the fight after 39 seconds, after scoring an ippon.

In August, Paltchik competed in the 2018 Budapest Grand Prix in Hungary and won a bronze medal, after defeating Martin Pacek of Sweden with an ippon. In October, he won the gold medal in the 2018 Abu Dhabi Grand Slam, after defeating German Karl-Richard Frey in the semifinal, and the Olympic silver medalist Elmar Gasimov in the final. That time in Abu Dhabi was the first time that Israelis were allowed to wear formal Israeli judo suits, and the Israeli national anthem, Hatikvah, was played while Paltchik was standing on the podium. In November, he won the gold medal in the 2018 The Hague Grand Prix when he defeated the Belarusian Mikita Sviryd in the final after the fight entered the golden score time.

In February, Paltchik won a bronze medal at the prestigious 2019 Paris Grand Slam. He reached the semifinals in which he faced Aaron Wolf from Japan. Ten seconds after the opening of the match, Paltchik scored a waza-ari, but lost in ippon a minute and 9 seconds before the end of the fight, after the Japanese managed to win. Paltchik went down to fight for the bronze medal, which he won by beating Croatia's Zlatko Kumrić by ippon.

On 17 March, Paltchik competed in the 2019 Ekaterinburg Grand Slam in Russia, and began the second round where he met Mikhail Minchin from Armenia, and won by ippon, obtained 58 seconds from the opening and went up to the quarterfinals. In the next stage, he defeated Jevgeņijs Borodavko from Latvia. In the semifinals he lost by ippon to Arman Adamian of Russia. In the fight for the bronze medal, Paltchik defeated Dutchman Michael Korrel with a waza-ari in the golden score, and won the medal. In July Paltchik won a bronze medal at the 2019 Zagreb Grand Prix by defeating Miklós Cirjenics (Hungary). Also in 2019, he won the Israeli championship in the +100 kg category.

=== 2020–21: European Champion ===
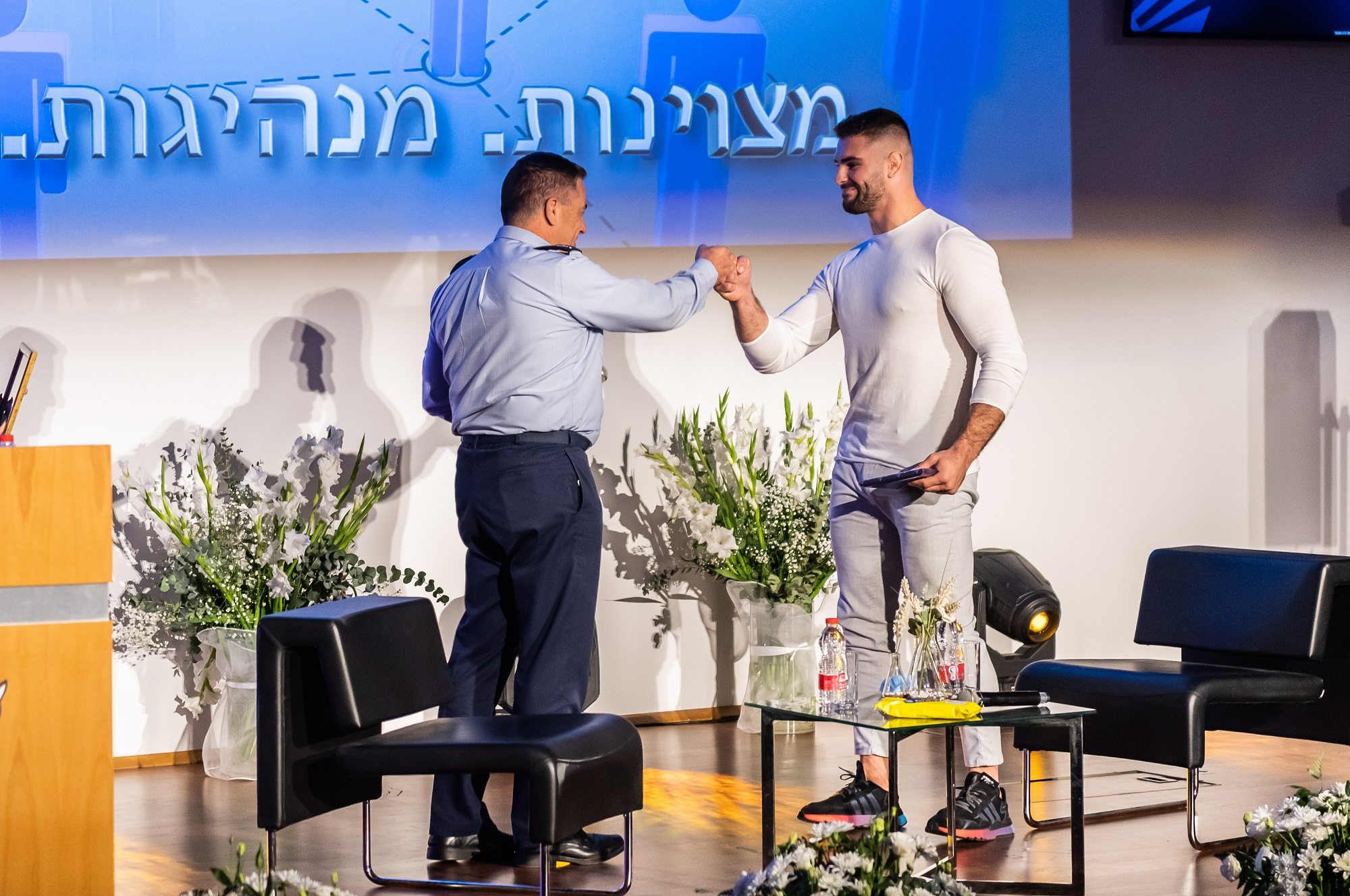
Paltchik in 2020

In January Paltchik won the gold medal in 2020 Tel Aviv Grand Prix by defeating Brazilian Leonardo Gonçalves. In February Paltchik won the gold medal at the 2020 Paris Grand Slam by defeating the Georgian Varlam Liparteliani.

At the 2020 European Championships in November, Paltchik became the European Champion, taking the gold medal by defeating the Russian Arman Adamian in the final.

Paltchik won one of the bronze medals in his event at the 2021 World Masters held in Doha, Qatar. He also won a silver medal in the 2021 Tel Aviv Grand Slam in Israel.

=== 2020 Tokyo Olympics ===
Paltchik represented Israel at the 2020 Summer Olympics, competing at the men's 100 kg weight category.
In his first match, Paltchik beat the 2019 Asian-Pacific champion, Mongolian Lkhagvasürengiin Otgonbaatar, to qualify for the quarter finals. There he met the 2017 world champion, Japanese Aaron Wolf, to whom he lost and turned to face Canadian two-time Pan American Champion Shady Elnahas in the repechage. Wolf went on to win the gold medal, while Paltchik, losing to Elnahas, ended the individual competition in 7th place.

=== 2022–present: World championship bronze medals, 2024 Paris Olympics and retirement ===
Paltchik won a silver medal at the 2022 Paris Grand Slam in France. He won one of the bronze medals in his event at the 2022 Tel Aviv Grand Slam held in Israel, as well as at the 2022 Ulaanbaatar Grand Slam in Mongolia and the 2022 World Masters in Jerusalem, Israel.

At the 2023 World Championships in Doha, Qatar, Paltchik won a bronze medal. At the 2023 World Masters in Budapest, Hungary, he won a silver medal, and at the 2023 Paris Grand Slam he won a bronze medal.

At the 2024 Astana Grand Slam in Kazakhstan, Paltchik won a bronze medal.

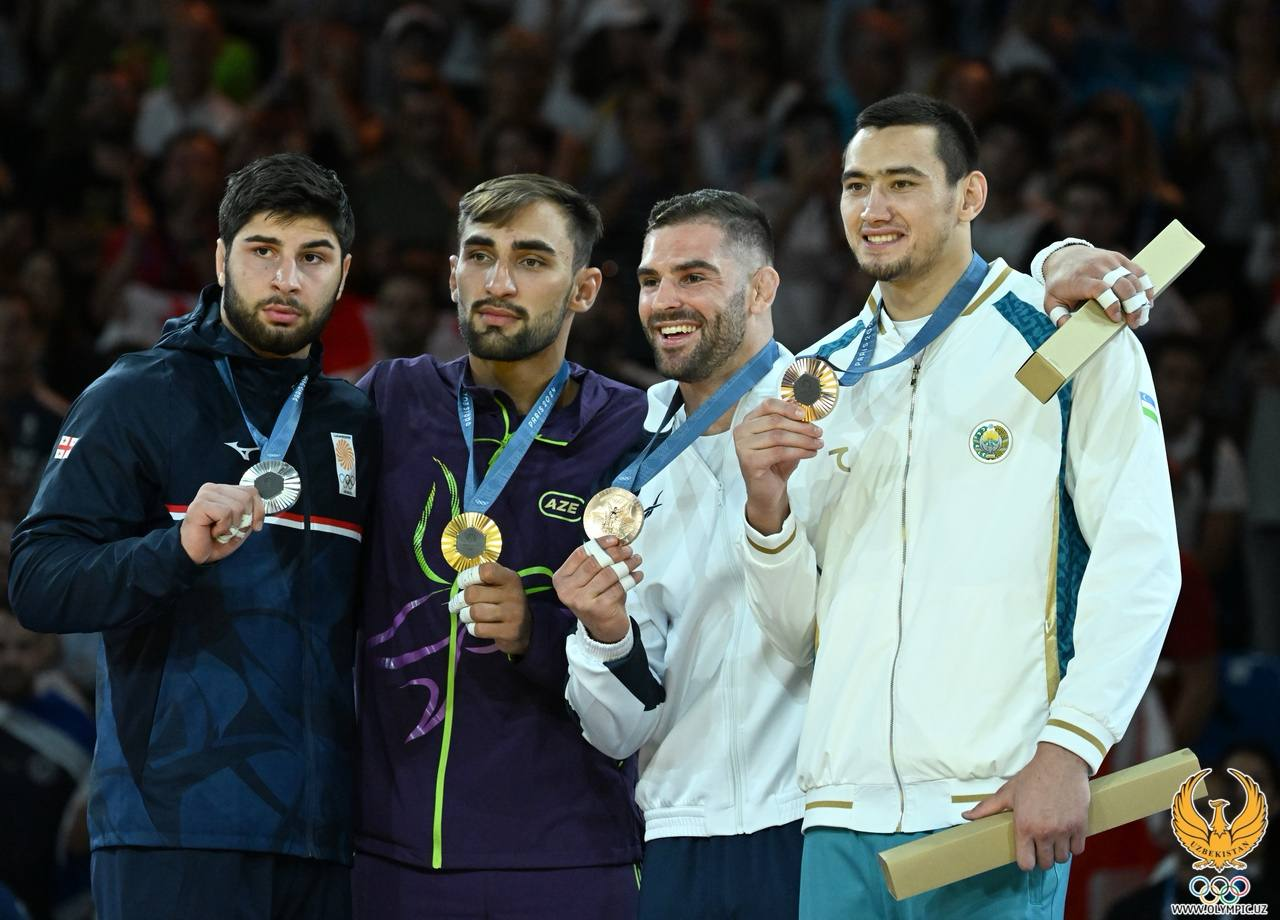
Paltchik (second from the right) with (from the left) Ilia Sulamanidze, Zelym Kotsoiev and Muzaffarbek Turoboyev at the Paris Olympics on 1 August 2024

Paltchik represented Israel at the 2024 Summer Olympics in Paris in judo in the men's 100 kg event on 1 August 2024, and in the mixed team event. He was also chosen as Olympic flagbearer jointly with Andrea Murez; the decision attracted scrutiny on social media amid the Gaza war, after a tweet he had posted, containing a picture of munitions he had signed accompanied by the text "from me to you with pleasure", resurfaced.

On 10 November 2025, Paltchik announced his retirement.

== TV appearances ==
Paltchik participates in the 11th season of Rokdim Im Kokhavim, the Israeli version of Dancing with the Stars.

== Personal life ==
Paltchik married his Israeli girlfriend Daniel Youlzary in April 2016, and they have twin boys.

== Medals ==
Year	Tournament	Place	Ref.
2017	Grand Prix Cancún	1st place, gold medalist(s)	
2017	Grand Slam Abu Dhabi	3rd place, bronze medalist(s)	
2018	Grand Prix Tbilisi	1st place, gold medalist(s)	
2018	European Championships	3rd place, bronze medalist(s)	
2018	Grand Prix Budapest	3rd place, bronze medalist(s)	
2018	Grand Slam Abu Dhabi	1st place, gold medalist(s)	
2018	Grand Prix The Hague	1st place, gold medalist(s)	
2019	Grand Slam Paris	3rd place, bronze medalist(s)	
2019	Grand Slam Ekaterinburg	3rd place, bronze medalist(s)	
2019	Grand Prix Zagreb	3rd place, bronze medalist(s)	
2020	Grand Prix Tel Aviv	1st place, gold medalist(s)	
2020	Grand Slam Paris	1st place, gold medalist(s)	
2020	European Championships	1st place, gold medalist(s)	
2021	World Masters	3rd place, bronze medalist(s)	
2021	Grand Slam Tel Aviv	2nd place, silver medalist(s)	
2022	Grand Slam Paris	2nd place, silver medalist(s)	
2022	Grand Slam Tel Aviv	3rd place, bronze medalist(s)	
2022	Grand Slam Ulaanbaatar	3rd place, bronze medalist(s)	
2022	World Masters	3rd place, bronze medalist(s)	
2023	Grand Slam Paris	3rd place, bronze medalist(s)	
2023	World Championships	3rd place, bronze medalist(s)	
2023	World Masters	2nd place, silver medalist(s)	
2024	Grand Slam Astana	3rd place, bronze medalist(s)	
2024	Olympic Games	3rd place, bronze medalist(s)	

=== Israeli Championships ===
Partial list:

(gold) +100 kg Category (2019)

Olympic Games
Preceded by Yakov Toumarkin; Hanna Knyazyeva-Minenko	Flagbearer for Israel; París 2024; With: Andrea Murez	Succeeded by Incumbent
