= 2024 World Judo Championships – Men's 100 kg =

Judo competition

Judo Men's 100 kg at the 2024 World Judo Championships
- Venue: Mubadala Arena
- Location: Abu Dhabi, United Arab Emirates
- Date: 23 May 2024
- Competitors: 41 from 36 nations
- Total prize money: €57,000

Medalists
gold medal	Zelym Kotsoiev (1st title)	Azerbaijan
silver medal	Shady El Nahas	Canada
bronze medal	Dota Arai	Japan
bronze medal	Nikoloz Sherazadishvili	Spain

Competition at external databases
- Links: IJF • JudoInside

The Men's 100 kg event at the 2024 World Judo Championships was held at the Mubadala Arena in Abu Dhabi, United Arab Emirates on 23 May 2024.

== Results ==
=== Finals ===
Semi-finals
(Canada) Shady El Nahas	10 (yellow card)
(Canada) Kyle Reyes	00
(Azerbaijan) Zelym Kotsoiev	02
(Portugal) Jorge Fonseca	00

Final
(Canada) Shady El Nahas	00 (yellow card)
(Azerbaijan) Zelym Kotsoiev	01

=== Repechage ===
Repechage
(Japan) Dota Arai	02 (yellow card)
(Tajikistan) Dzhakhongir Madzhidov	00
(Spain) Nikoloz Sherazadishvili	10 (yellow card)
(Germany) George Udsilauri	00 (yellow card)

Bronze medal
(Japan) Dota Arai	11
(Portugal) Jorge Fonseca	00
(Spain) Nikoloz Sherazadishvili	10 (yellow card)
(Canada) Kyle Reyes	00

=== Pool A ===
First round
(Austria) Aaron Fara	10 (yellow card)
(Italy) Gennaro Pirelli	01 (yellow card)
(Hungary) Zsombor Vég	01
(Japan) Dota Arai	02

Round of 32
(Canada) Shady El Nahas	02
(Austria) Aaron Fara	00 (yellow card)
(Bahrain) Zelimkhan Bashaev	11
(Turkmenistan) Baýmyrat Majanow	00 (yellow card)
(United Arab Emirates) Dzhafar Kostoev	01
(Japan) Dota Arai	10
(Serbia) Bojan Došen	00 (yellow card)
(Cyprus) Georgios Kroussaniotakis	02

Round of 16
(Canada) Shady El Nahas	10 (yellow card)
(Bahrain) Zelimkhan Bashaev	00
(Japan) Dota Arai	11
(Cyprus) Georgios Kroussaniotakis	01

Quarter-finals
(Canada) Shady El Nahas	02
(Japan) Dota Arai	01

=== Pool B ===
First round
(Croatia) Zlatko Kumrić	01
(Bulgaria) Boris Georgiev	00 (yellow card)
(Belgium) Toma Nikiforov	01
(Netherlands) Simeon Catharina	02
Arman Adamian	02
(Chile) Thomas Briceño	00

Round of 32
(Canada) Kyle Reyes	02
(Croatia) Zlatko Kumrić	00
(Netherlands) Simeon Catharina	10
(Romania) Asley González	00
(Brazil) Leonardo Gonçalves	01
Arman Adamian	11
(Tajikistan) Dzhakhongir Madzhidov	02 (yellow card)
(Germany) Louis Mai	00 (yellow card)

Round of 16
(Canada) Kyle Reyes	01 (yellow card)
(Netherlands) Simeon Catharina	00
Arman Adamian	00 (yellow card)
(Tajikistan) Dzhakhongir Madzhidov	10 (yellow card)

Quarter-finals
(Canada) Kyle Reyes	01
(Tajikistan) Dzhakhongir Madzhidov	00

=== Pool C ===
First round
(Poland) Piotr Kuczera	00
(South Korea) Won Jong-hoon	10
(Malta) Isaac Bezzina	00
(Brazil) Rafael Buzacarini	10

Round of 32
(Azerbaijan) Zelym Kotsoiev	02
(South Korea) Won Jong-hoon	00
(Israel) Peter Paltchik	w/o
~~(Egypt) Karim Ibrahim~~
(Spain) Nikoloz Sherazadishvili	02 (yellow card)
(Brazil) Rafael Buzacarini	00
(India) Avtar Singh	00
(Colombia) Francisco Balanta	01 (yellow card)

Round of 16
(Azerbaijan) Zelym Kotsoiev	11
(Israel) Peter Paltchik	00
(Spain) Nikoloz Sherazadishvili	11
(Colombia) Francisco Balanta	00

Quarter-finals
(Azerbaijan) Zelym Kotsoiev	10 (yellow card)
(Spain) Nikoloz Sherazadishvili	00

=== Pool D ===
First round
(Austria) Laurin Boehler	01
(Switzerland) Daniel Eich	02 (yellow card)
(Denmark) Mathias Madsen	00
(Tunisia) Koussay Ben Ghares	02 (yellow card)

Round of 32
(Netherlands) Michael Korrel	00 (yellow card)
(Germany) George Udsilauri	02
(Switzerland) Daniel Eich	02 (yellow card)
(Kazakhstan) Nurlykhan Sharkhan	01 (yellow card)
(Portugal) Jorge Fonseca	10
(Tunisia) Koussay Ben Ghares	00
(Algeria) Mustapha Bouamar	00
(Ukraine) Anton Savytskiy	10 (yellow card)

Round of 16
(Germany) George Udsilauri	01 (yellow card)
(Switzerland) Daniel Eich	00 (yellow card)
(Portugal) Jorge Fonseca	10
(Ukraine) Anton Savytskiy	00

Quarter-finals
(Germany) George Udsilauri	00
(Portugal) Jorge Fonseca	01

== Prize money ==
The sums listed bring the total prizes awarded to €57,000 for the individual event.

Medal	Total	Judoka	Coach
Gold	€26,000	€20,800	€5,200
Silver	€15,000	€12,000	€3,000
Bronze	€8,000	€6,400	€1,600
