= Judo at the 2019 European Games – Men's 100 kg =

Judo competition

Judo Men's 100 kg at the 2019 European Games
- Venue: Čyžoŭka-Arena
- Location: Minsk, Belarus
- Date: 24 June
- Competitors: 29 from 25 nations

Medalists
gold medal	Arman Adamian (1st title)	Russia
silver medal	Varlam Liparteliani	Georgia
bronze medal	Elmar Gasimov	Azerbaijan
bronze medal	Cyrille Maret	France

Competition at external databases
- Links: IJF • JudoInside

The men's 100 kg judo event at the 2019 European Games in Minsk was held on 24 June at the Čyžoŭka-Arena.

== Results ==
=== Final ===
Final
Varlam Liparteliani (GEO)	00
Arman Adamian (RUS)	10

=== Repechage ===
Repechage
Danilo Pantić (MNE)	00
Elmar Gasimov (AZE)	01

Third place
Elmar Gasimov (AZE)	10
Zlatko Kumrić (CRO)	00

Repechage
Daniel Mukete (BLR)	10
Toma Nikiforov (BEL)	01

Third place
Daniel Mukete (BLR)	00
Cyrille Maret (FRA)	01

=== Top half ===
Round of 32
Mikita Sviryd (BLR)	10
Iwo Baraniewski (POL)	00
Karl-Richard Frey (GER)	01
Joakim Dvärby (SWE)	00
Danilo Pantić (MNE)	10
Aaron Fara (AUT)	00
Kazbek Zankishiev (RUS)	10
Karolis Bauža (LTU)	00
Cyrille Maret (FRA)	10
Miklós Cirjenics (HUN)	00
Elmar Gasimov (AZE)	01
Anton Savytskiy (UKR)	00
Daniel Dichev (BUL)	00
Grigori Minaškin (EST)	10

Round of 16
Varlam Liparteliani (GEO)	10
Mikita Sviryd (BLR)	00
Karl-Richard Frey (GER)	00
Danilo Pantić (MNE)	10
Kazbek Zankishiev (RUS)	00
Cyrille Maret (FRA)	01
Elmar Gasimov (AZE)	11
Grigori Minaškin (EST)	00

Quarterfinals
Varlam Liparteliani (GEO)	11
Danilo Pantić (MNE)	00
Cyrille Maret (FRA)	10
Elmar Gasimov (AZE)	00

Semifinals
Varlam Liparteliani (GEO)	10
Cyrille Maret (FRA)	00

=== Bottom half ===
Round of 32
Daniel Mukete (BLR)	10
Giuliano Loporchio (ITA)	00
~~Alexandre Iddir (FRA)~~
Zlatko Kumrić (CRO)	WO
Michal Horák (CZE)	00
Zalán Ohát (HUN)	01
Jorge Fonseca (POR)	11
Luca Kunszabo (ROU)	01
Mathias Madsen (DEN)	00
Arman Adamian (RUS)	01
Toma Nikiforov (BEL)	01
Jevgeņijs Borodavko (LAT)	00
Bojan Došen (SRB)	00
Zelym Kotsoiev (AZE)	10

Round of 16
Michael Korrel (NED)	00
Daniel Mukete (BLR)	01
Zlatko Kumrić (CRO)	10
Zalán Ohát (HUN)	00
Jorge Fonseca (POR)	00
Arman Adamian (RUS)	10
Toma Nikiforov (BEL)	10
Zelym Kotsoiev (AZE)	01

Quarterfinals
Daniel Mukete (BLR)	00
Zlatko Kumrić (CRO)	10
Arman Adamian (RUS)	10
Toma Nikiforov (BEL)	00

Semifinals
Zlatko Kumrić (CRO)	01
Arman Adamian (RUS)	10
