= 2017 European Judo Championships – Men's 100 kg =

Judo competition

Judo Men's 100 kg at the 2017 European Judo Championships
- Venue: Torwar Hall
- Location: Warsaw, Poland
- Date: April 22, 2017
- Competitors: 35 from 26 nations

Medalists
gold medal	Elkhan Mammadov (1st title)	Azerbaijan
silver medal	Cyrille Maret	France
bronze medal	Kirill Denisov	Russia
bronze medal	Kazbek Zankishiev	Russia

Competition at external databases
- Links: IJF • JudoInside

The men's 100 kg competition at the 2017 European Judo Championships in Warsaw was held on 22 April at the Torwar Hall.

== Results ==
=== Finals ===
Semi-finals
Elmar Gasimov (AZE)	000
Elkhan Mammadov (AZE)	010
Michael Korrel (NED)	000
Cyrille Maret (FRA)	100

Final
Elkhan Mammadov (AZE)	100
Cyrille Maret (FRA)	000

=== Repechages ===
Repechage		Bronze medal
Kirill Denisov (RUS)	100
Peter Paltchik (ISR)	000	Kirill Denisov (RUS)	110
		Michael Korrel (NED)	000

Repechage		Bronze medal
Kazbek Zankishiev (RUS)	100
Varlam Liparteliani (GEO)	000	Kazbek Zankishiev (RUS)	100
		Elmar Gasimov (AZE)	000

=== Pool A ===
First round
Oleksandr Romanyuk (UKR)	000
Kirill Denisov (RUS)	100

Second round
Elmar Gasimov (AZE)	010
Philipp Galandi (GER)	000
Gergő Fogasy (HUN)	000
Mikita Sviryd (BLR)	100
Jorge Fonseca (POR)	140
Zlatko Kumrić (CRO)	000
Kirill Denisov (RUS)	100
Danilo Pantić (MNE)	000

Third round
Elmar Gasimov (AZE)	010
Mikita Sviryd (BLR)	000
Jorge Fonseca (POR)	000
Kirill Denisov (RUS)	110

Quarterfinals
Elmar Gasimov (AZE)	120
Kirill Denisov (RUS)	000

=== Pool B ===
First round

Second round
Elkhan Mammadov (AZE)	110
Vincenzo D'Arco (ITA)	000
Artūrs Ņikiforenko (LAT)	010
Christoph Kronberger (AUT)	000
Martin Pacek (SWE)	000
Peter Paltchik (ISR)	010
Borislav Bogdanić (BIH)	000
Milan Randl (SVK)	110

Third round
Elkhan Mammadov (AZE)	110
Artūrs Ņikiforenko (LAT)	000
Peter Paltchik (ISR)	010
Milan Randl (SVK)	000

Quarterfinals
Elkhan Mammadov (AZE)	100
Peter Paltchik (ISR)	000

=== Pool C ===
First round
Jakub Wójcik (POL)	000
Aaron Fara (AUT)	100

Second round
Michael Korrel (NED)	100
Daniel Matei (ROU)	000
Aaron Fara (AUT)	000
Miklos Cirjenics (HUN)	100
Kazbek Zankishiev (RUS)	100
Karolis Bauža (LTU)	000
Johannes Frey (GER)	020
Matej Hajas (SVK)	000

Third round
Michael Korrel (NED)	020
Miklos Cirjenics (HUN)	000
Kazbek Zankishiev (RUS)	100
Johannes Frey (GER)	000

Quarterfinals
Michael Korrel (NED)	100
Kazbek Zankishiev (RUS)	000

=== Pool D ===
First round
Varlam Liparteliani (GEO)	110
Giuliano Loporchio (ITA)	000

Second round
Cyrille Maret (FRA)	110
Theodoros Masmanidis (GRE)	000
Grigori Minaskin (EST)	000
Jevgenijs Borodavko (LAT)	100
Toma Nikiforov (BEL)	010
Varlam Liparteliani (GEO)	020
Benjamin Fletcher (GBR)	110
Joakim Dvarby (SWE)	010

Third round
Cyrille Maret (FRA)	100
Jevgenijs Borodavko (LAT)	000
Varlam Liparteliani (GEO)	110
Benjamin Fletcher (GBR)	010

Quarterfinals
Cyrille Maret (FRA)	100
Varlam Liparteliani (GEO)	000
