= 2020 European Judo Championships – Men's 100 kg =

Judo competition

Judo Men's 100 kg at the 2020 European Judo Championships
- Venue: O2 Arena
- Location: Prague, Czech Republic
- Date: 21 November
- Competitors: 33 from 25 nations

Medalists
gold medal	Peter Paltchik (1st title)	Israel
silver medal	Arman Adamian	Russia
bronze medal	Jorge Fonseca	Portugal
bronze medal	Zelym Kotsoiev	Azerbaijan

Competition at external databases
- Links: IJF • JudoInside

The men's 100 kg competition at the 2020 European Judo Championships was held on 21 November at the O2 Arena.

== Results ==
=== Finals ===
Semifinals
Zelym Kotsoiev (AZE)	01
Arman Adamian (RUS)	10
Peter Paltchik (ISR)	01
Varlam Liparteliani (GEO)	00

Final
Arman Adamian (RUS)	00
Peter Paltchik (ISR)	01

=== Repechage ===
Repechage
Jorge Fonseca (POR)	10
Mert Şişmanlar (TUR)	00

Third place
Jorge Fonseca (POR)	10
Varlam Liparteliani (GEO)	00

Repechage
Boris Georgiev (BUL)	01
Elmar Gasimov (AZE)	00

Third place
Boris Georgiev (BUL)	00
Zelym Kotsoiev (AZE)	10

=== Pool A ===
Round of 64

Round of 32
Jorge Fonseca (POR)	10
Grigori Minaškin (EST)	00
Cédric Olivar (FRA)	00
Marko Kumrić (CRO)	01
Zelym Kotsoiev (AZE)	10
Oleksii Lysenko (POL)	00
Mikita Sviryd (BLR)	00
Miklós Cirjenics (HUN)	10

Round of 16
Jorge Fonseca (POR)	01
Marko Kumrić (CRO)	00
Zelym Kotsoiev (AZE)	10
Miklós Cirjenics (HUN)	00

Quarterfinals
Jorge Fonseca (POR)	00
Zelym Kotsoiev (AZE)	01

=== Pool B ===
Round of 64

Round of 32
Niyaz Ilyasov (RUS)	00
Aleksandar Kukolj (SRB)	01
Mert Şişmanlar (TUR)	10
Anton Savytskiy (UKR)	00
Arman Adamian (RUS)	10
Simeon Catharina (NED)	00
Mathias Madsen (DEN)	01
Otto Imala (SUI)	10

Round of 16
Aleksandar Kukolj (SRB)	00
Mert Şişmanlar (TUR)	01
Arman Adamian (RUS)	10
Otto Imala (SUI)	00

Quarterfinals
Mert Şişmanlar (TUR)	00
Arman Adamian (RUS)	10

=== Pool C ===
Round of 64

Round of 32
Peter Paltchik (ISR)	10
Benjamin Fletcher (IRL)	00
Toma Nikiforov (BEL)	00
Jevgeņijs Borodavko (LAT)	10
Alexandre Iddir (FRA)	01
Zsombor Vég (HUN)	00
Kacper Szczurowski (POL)	00
Boris Georgiev (BUL)	10

Round of 16
Peter Paltchik (ISR)	10
Jevgeņijs Borodavko (LAT)	00
Alexandre Iddir (FRA)	00
Boris Georgiev (BUL)	01

Quarterfinals
Peter Paltchik (ISR)	01
Boris Georgiev (BUL)	00

=== Pool D ===
Round of 64
Daniel Mukete (BLR)	10
Zlatko Kumrić (CRO)	00

Round of 32
Varlam Liparteliani (GEO)	10
Georgios Malliaropoulos (GRE)	00
Karl-Richard Frey (GER)	10
Eduard Şerban (ROU)	00
Elmar Gasimov (AZE)	10
Aaron Fara (AUT)	00
Bojan Došen (SRB)	00
Daniel Mukete (BLR)	01

Round of 16
Varlam Liparteliani (GEO)	11
Karl-Richard Frey (GER)	00
Elmar Gasimov (AZE)	10
Daniel Mukete (BLR)	01

Quarterfinals
Varlam Liparteliani (GEO)	10
Elmar Gasimov (AZE)	00
