= 2023 World Judo Championships – Men's 100 kg =

Judo competition

Judo Men's 100 kg at the 2023 World Judo Championships
- Venue: Ali Bin Hamad Al Attiya Arena
- Location: Doha, Qatar
- Date: 12 May 2023
- Competitors: 44 from 37 nations
- Total prize money: €57,000

Medalists
gold medal	Arman Adamian (1st title)
silver medal	Lukáš Krpálek	Czech Republic
bronze medal	Zelym Kotsoiev	Azerbaijan
bronze medal	Peter Paltchik	Israel

Competition at external databases
- Links: IJF • JudoInside

The Men's 100 kg event at the 2023 World Judo Championships was held at the Ali Bin Hamad al-Attiyah Arena in Doha, Qatar on 12 May 2023.

== Results ==
=== Finals ===
Semi-finals
Arman Adamian	10
(Canada) Shady El Nahas	00
(Czech Republic) Lukáš Krpálek	10
(Azerbaijan) Zelym Kotsoiev	00

Final
Arman Adamian	10
(Czech Republic) Lukáš Krpálek	00

=== Repechage ===
Repechage
(Georgia (country)) Ilia Sulamanidze	01
(Canada) Kyle Reyes	00
(Kazakhstan) Nurlykhan Sharkhan	00
(Israel) Peter Paltchik	01

Bronze medal
(Georgia (country)) Ilia Sulamanidze	00
(Azerbaijan) Zelym Kotsoiev	10
(Israel) Peter Paltchik	w/o
(Canada) Shady El Nahas

=== Pool A ===
First round
(United Arab Emirates) Dzhafar Kostoev	00
(Mongolia) Batkhuyagiin Gonchigsüren	01
(Peru) Daryl Yamamoto	00
(Serbia) Bojan Došen	10
Arman Adamian	10
(Algeria) Mustapha Bouamar	00

Round of 32
(Georgia (country)) Ilia Sulamanidze	01
(Mongolia) Batkhuyagiin Gonchigsüren	00
(Croatia) Zlatko Kumrić	11
(United States) L.A. Smith III	00
(Netherlands) Simeon Catharina	10
(Serbia) Bojan Došen	00
Arman Adamian	10
Adnan Khankan	00

Round of 16
(Georgia (country)) Ilia Sulamanidze	02
(Croatia) Zlatko Kumrić	00
(Netherlands) Simeon Catharina	01
Arman Adamian	11

Quarter-finals
(Georgia (country)) Ilia Sulamanidze	00
Arman Adamian	10

=== Pool B ===
First round
(Gabon) Luc Manongho	00
(Colombia) Francisco Balanta	10
(Germany) George Udsilauri	00
(Belgium) Toma Nikiforov	10
(Brazil) Rafael Buzacarini	w/o
~~(Fiji) Tevita Takayawa~~

Round of 32
(Canada) Shady El Nahas	10
(Estonia) Grigori Minaškin	01
(Colombia) Francisco Balanta	01
(Czech Republic) Martin Bezděk	00
(Canada) Kyle Reyes	01
(Belgium) Toma Nikiforov	00
(Brazil) Rafael Buzacarini	10
(Qatar) Reda Nafwa	00

Round of 16
(Canada) Shady El Nahas	01
(Colombia) Francisco Balanta	00
(Canada) Kyle Reyes	10
(Brazil) Rafael Buzacarini	00

Quarter-finals
(Canada) Shady El Nahas	10
(Canada) Kyle Reyes	00

=== Pool C ===
First round
(Czech Republic) Lukáš Krpálek	10
(Italy) Gennaro Pirelli	00
(India) Avtar Singh	00
(Romania) Asley González	11
(Cuba) Liester Cardona	00
(United Kingdom) Harry Lovell-Hewitt	11

Round of 32
(Netherlands) Michael Korrel	00
(Hungary) Zsombor Vég	01
(Czech Republic) Lukáš Krpálek	10
(Brazil) Leonardo Gonçalves	00
(Georgia (country)) Varlam Liparteliani	10
(Romania) Asley González	00
(United Kingdom) Harry Lovell-Hewitt	00
(Kazakhstan) Nurlykhan Sharkhan	10

Round of 16
(Hungary) Zsombor Vég	00
(Czech Republic) Lukáš Krpálek	10
(Georgia (country)) Varlam Liparteliani	00
(Kazakhstan) Nurlykhan Sharkhan	10

Quarter-finals
(Czech Republic) Lukáš Krpálek	02
(Kazakhstan) Nurlykhan Sharkhan	00

=== Pool D ===
First round
(Serbia) Aleksandar Kukolj	10
(Tajikistan) Akobir Abubakri	00
(Uzbekistan) Muzaffarbek Turoboyev	00
(Japan) Kentaro Iida	10
(Bulgaria) Boris Georgiev	00
(Denmark) Mathias Madsen	10

Round of 32
(Azerbaijan) Zelym Kotsoiev	02
(Serbia) Aleksandar Kukolj	00
(Austria) Aaron Fara	10
(Chile) Thomas Briceño	00
(Israel) Peter Paltchik	10
(Japan) Kentaro Iida	00
(Denmark) Mathias Madsen	00
Niyaz Ilyasov	01

Round of 16
(Azerbaijan) Zelym Kotsoiev	10
(Austria) Aaron Fara	00
(Israel) Peter Paltchik	01
Niyaz Ilyasov	00

Quarter-finals
(Azerbaijan) Zelym Kotsoiev	10
(Israel) Peter Paltchik	00

== Prize money ==
The sums listed bring the total prizes awarded to €57,000 for the individual event.

Medal	Total	Judoka	Coach
Gold	€26,000	€20,800	€5,200
Silver	€15,000	€12,000	€3,000
Bronze	€8,000	€6,400	€1,600
