= 2018 European Judo Championships – Men's 100 kg =

Judo competition

Judo Men's 100 kg at the 2018 European Judo Championships
- Venue: Expo Tel Aviv
- Location: Tel Aviv, Israel
- Date: 28 April

Medalists
| gold medal | Toma Nikiforov (1st title) | Belgium |
| silver medal | Cyrille Maret | France |
| bronze medal | Zelym Kotsoiev | Azerbaijan |
| bronze medal | Peter Paltchik | Israel |

Competition at external databases
- Links: IJF • JudoInside

The men's 100 kg competition at the 2018 European Judo Championships was held on 28 April at the Expo Tel Aviv.

== Results ==
=== Finals ===
Semi-finals
Daniel Mukete (BLR) | 00
Toma Nikiforov (BEL) | 01
Peter Paltchik (ISR) | 00
Cyrille Maret (FRA) | 10

Final
Toma Nikiforov (BEL) | 10
Cyrille Maret (FRA) | 01

=== Repechage ===
Repechage
Aaron Fara (AUT) | 00
Niyaz Bilalov (RUS) | 01

Third place
Niyaz Bilalov (RUS) | 00
Peter Paltchik (ISR) | 10

Repechage
Zelym Kotsoiev (AZE) | 11
Jorge Fonseca (POR) | 01

Third place
Zelym Kotsoiev (AZE) | 10
Daniel Mukete (BLR) | 00

=== Pool A ===
First round
Zalán Ohát (HUN) | 00
Daniel Mukete (BLR) | 10
Benjamin Fletcher (IRL) | 10
Martin Pacek (SWE) | 00
Aaron Fara (AUT) | 10
Danilo Pantić (MNE) | 00

Round of 16
Varlam Liparteliani (GEO) | 00
Daniel Mukete (BLR) | 01
Benjamin Fletcher (IRL) | 00
Aaron Fara (AUT) | 10

Quarterfinals
Daniel Mukete (BLR) | 11
Aaron Fara (AUT) | 01

=== Pool B ===
First round
Elkhan Mammadov (AZE) | 10
Matej Hajas (SVK) | 00
Niyaz Bilalov (RUS) | 10
Anton Savytskiy (UKR) | 00
Toma Nikiforov (BEL) | 10
Giuliano Loporchio (ITA) | 00
Philipp Galandi (GER) | 00
Karolis Bauža (LTU) | 11

Round of 16
Elkhan Mammadov (AZE) | 00
Niyaz Bilalov (RUS) | 01
Toma Nikiforov (BEL) | 01
Karolis Bauža (LTU) | 00

Quarterfinals
Niyaz Bilalov (RUS) | 00
Toma Nikiforov (BEL) | 10

=== Pool C ===
First round
Kirill Denisov (RUS) | 10
Zlatko Kumrić (CRO) | 00
Milan Randl (SVK) | 00
Zelym Kotsoiev (AZE) | 11
Peter Paltchik (ISR) | 01
Jevgeņijs Borodavko (LAT) | 00
Joakim Dvärby (SWE) | 00
Bojan Došen (SRB) | 10

Round of 16
Kirill Denisov (RUS) | 01
Zelym Kotsoiev (AZE) | 10
Peter Paltchik (ISR) | 10
Bojan Došen (SRB) | 00

Quarterfinals
Zelym Kotsoiev (AZE) | 00
Peter Paltchik (ISR) | 01

=== Pool D ===
First round
Miklós Cirjenics (HUN) | 11
Mikita Sviryd (BLR) | 00
Luca Kunszabo (ROU) | 00
Cyrille Maret (FRA) | 10
Jorge Fonseca (POR) | 11
Laurin Boehler (AUT) | 00
Patrik Moser (SUI) | 00
Grigori Minaškin (EST) | 10

Round of 16
Miklós Cirjenics (HUN) | 00
Cyrille Maret (FRA) | 10
Jorge Fonseca (POR) | 10
Grigori Minaškin (EST) | 00

Quarterfinals
Cyrille Maret (FRA) | 10
Jorge Fonseca (POR) | 00
