= 2020 Judo Grand Slam Düsseldorf =

Judo competition

Judo 2020 Judo Grand Slam Düsseldorf
- Venue: ISS Dome
- Location: Düsseldorf, Germany
- Dates: 21–23 February 2020
- Competitors: 659 from 115 nations

Competition at external databases
- Links: IJF • EJU • JudoInside

The 2020 Judo Grand Slam Düsseldorf was held at the ISS Dome in Düsseldorf, Germany from 21 to 23 February 2020.

== Medal summary ==
=== Men's events ===
Event	Gold	Silver	Bronze
Extra-lightweight (−60 kg)	Naohisa Takato (JPN)	Yang Yung-wei (TPE)	Tornike Tsjakadoea (NED)
Extra-lightweight (−60 kg)	Naohisa Takato (JPN)	Yang Yung-wei (TPE)	Kim Won-jin (KOR)
Half-lightweight (−66 kg)	Hifumi Abe (JPN)	Vazha Margvelashvili (GEO)	Yakub Shamilov (RUS)
Half-lightweight (−66 kg)	Hifumi Abe (JPN)	Vazha Margvelashvili (GEO)	Alberto Gaitero (ESP)
Lightweight (−73 kg)	Shohei Ono (JPN)	An Chang-rim (KOR)	Rustam Orujov (AZE)
Lightweight (−73 kg)	Shohei Ono (JPN)	An Chang-rim (KOR)	Tsend-Ochiryn Tsogtbaatar (MGL)
Half-middleweight (−81 kg)	Tato Grigalashvili (GEO)	Khasan Khalmurzaev (RUS)	Robin Pacek (SWE)
Half-middleweight (−81 kg)	Tato Grigalashvili (GEO)	Khasan Khalmurzaev (RUS)	Frank de Wit (NED)
Middleweight (−90 kg)	Davlat Bobonov (UZB)	Quedjau Nhabali (UKR)	Beka Gviniashvili (GEO)
Middleweight (−90 kg)	Davlat Bobonov (UZB)	Quedjau Nhabali (UKR)	Shoichiro Mukai (JPN)
Half-heavyweight (−100 kg)	Mukhammadkarim Khurramov (UZB)	Elmar Gasimov (AZE)	Miklós Cirjenics (HUN)
Half-heavyweight (−100 kg)	Mukhammadkarim Khurramov (UZB)	Elmar Gasimov (AZE)	Zelym Kotsoiev (AZE)
Heavyweight (+100 kg)	Guram Tushishvili (GEO)	Johannes Frey (GER)	Kim Min-jong (KOR)
Heavyweight (+100 kg)	Guram Tushishvili (GEO)	Johannes Frey (GER)	Rafael Silva (BRA)

=== Women's events ===
Event	Gold	Silver	Bronze
Extra-lightweight (−48 kg)	Shirine Boukli (FRA)	Funa Tonaki (JPN)	Sabina Giliazova (RUS)
Extra-lightweight (−48 kg)	Shirine Boukli (FRA)	Funa Tonaki (JPN)	Julia Figueroa (ESP)
Half-lightweight (−52 kg)	Uta Abe (JPN)	Amandine Buchard (FRA)	Angelica Delgado (USA)
Half-lightweight (−52 kg)	Uta Abe (JPN)	Amandine Buchard (FRA)	Bishreltiin Khorloodoi (MGL)
Lightweight (−57 kg)	Jessica Klimkait (CAN)	Sarah-Léonie Cysique (FRA)	Anastasia Konkina (RUS)
Lightweight (−57 kg)	Jessica Klimkait (CAN)	Sarah-Léonie Cysique (FRA)	Dorjsürengiin Sumiyaa (MGL)
Half-middleweight (−63 kg)	Miku Tashiro (JPN)	Tina Trstenjak (SLO)	Maylín del Toro Carvajal (CUB)
Half-middleweight (−63 kg)	Miku Tashiro (JPN)	Tina Trstenjak (SLO)	Boldyn Gankhaich (MGL)
Middleweight (−70 kg)	Chizuru Arai (JPN)	Gabriella Willems (BEL)	Margaux Pinot (FRA)
Middleweight (−70 kg)	Chizuru Arai (JPN)	Gabriella Willems (BEL)	Giovanna Scoccimarro (GER)
Half-heavyweight (−78 kg)	Shori Hamada (JPN)	Mayra Aguiar (BRA)	Fanny Estelle Posvite (FRA)
Half-heavyweight (−78 kg)	Shori Hamada (JPN)	Mayra Aguiar (BRA)	Anna-Maria Wagner (GER)
Heavyweight (+78 kg)	Sarah Asahina (JPN)	Iryna Kindzerska (AZE)	Hortence Vanessa Mballa Atangana (CMR)
Heavyweight (+78 kg)	Sarah Asahina (JPN)	Iryna Kindzerska (AZE)	Idalys Ortiz (CUB)

Source Results

=== Medal table ===
* Host nation (Germany)

Rank	Nation	Gold	Silver	Bronze	Total
1	Japan (JPN)	8	1	1	10
2	Georgia (GEO)	2	1	1	4
3	Uzbekistan (UZB)	2	0	0	2
4	France (FRA)	1	2	2	5
5	Canada (CAN)	1	0	0	1
6	Azerbaijan (AZE)	0	2	2	4
7	Russia (RUS)	0	1	3	4
8	Germany (GER)*	0	1	2	3
8	South Korea (KOR)	0	1	2	3
10	Brazil (BRA)	0	1	1	2
11	Belgium (BEL)	0	1	0	1
11	Chinese Taipei (TPE)	0	1	0	1
11	Slovenia (SLO)	0	1	0	1
11	Ukraine (UKR)	0	1	0	1
15	Mongolia (MGL)	0	0	4	4
16	Cuba (CUB)	0	0	2	2
16	Netherlands (NED)	0	0	2	2
16	Spain (ESP)	0	0	2	2
19	Cameroon (CMR)	0	0	1	1
19	Hungary (HUN)	0	0	1	1
19	Sweden (SWE)	0	0	1	1
19	United States (USA)	0	0	1	1
Totals (22 entries)		14	14	28	56
