= 2023 Judo World Masters =

Judo competition

Judo 2023 Judo World Masters
- Venue: László Papp Budapest Sports Arena
- Location: Budapest, Hungary
- Dates: 4–6 August 2023
- Competitors: 419 from 59 nations
- Total prize money: €196,000

Competition at external databases
- Links: IJF • EJU • JudoInside

The 2023 Judo World Masters was held at the László Papp Budapest Sports Arena in Budapest, Hungary, from 4 to 6 August 2023 as part of the IJF World Tour and during the 2024 Summer Olympics qualification period.

== Medal summary ==
=== Men's events ===
Event	Gold	Silver	Bronze
Extra-lightweight (−60 kg)	Ryuju Nagayama (JPN)	Enkhtaivany Ariunbold (MGL)	Naohisa Takato (JPN)
Extra-lightweight (−60 kg)	Ryuju Nagayama (JPN)	Enkhtaivany Ariunbold (MGL)	Kim Won-jin (KOR)
Half-lightweight (−66 kg)	Ryoma Tanaka (JPN)	Denis Vieru (MDA)	Bayanmönkhiin Narmandakh (UAE)
Half-lightweight (−66 kg)	Ryoma Tanaka (JPN)	Denis Vieru (MDA)	An Ba-ul (KOR)
Lightweight (−73 kg)	Soichi Hashimoto (JPN)	Behruzi Khojazoda (TJK)	Lasha Shavdatuashvili (GEO)
Lightweight (−73 kg)	Soichi Hashimoto (JPN)	Behruzi Khojazoda (TJK)	Petru Pelivan (MDA)
Half-middleweight (−81 kg)	Matthias Casse (BEL)	Guilherme Schimidt (BRA)	Takanori Nagase (JPN)
Half-middleweight (−81 kg)	Matthias Casse (BEL)	Guilherme Schimidt (BRA)	Tato Grigalashvili (GEO)
Middleweight (−90 kg)	Lasha Bekauri (GEO)	Luka Maisuradze (GEO)	Davlat Bobonov (UZB)
Middleweight (−90 kg)	Lasha Bekauri (GEO)	Luka Maisuradze (GEO)	Alexis Mathieu (FRA)
Half-heavyweight (−100 kg)	Muzaffarbek Turoboyev (UZB)	Peter Paltchik (ISR)	Kyle Reyes (CAN)
Half-heavyweight (−100 kg)	Muzaffarbek Turoboyev (UZB)	Peter Paltchik (ISR)	Ilia Sulamanidze (GEO)
Heavyweight (+100 kg)	Martti Puumalainen (FIN)	Temur Rakhimov (TJK)	Tatsuru Saito (JPN)
Heavyweight (+100 kg)	Martti Puumalainen (FIN)	Temur Rakhimov (TJK)	Gela Zaalishvili (GEO)

Source results:

=== Women's events ===
Event	Gold	Silver	Bronze
Extra-lightweight (−48 kg)	Wakana Koga (JPN)	Maria Celia Laborde (USA)	Assunta Scutto (ITA)
Extra-lightweight (−48 kg)	Wakana Koga (JPN)	Maria Celia Laborde (USA)	Bavuudorjiin Baasankhüü (MGL)
Half-lightweight (−52 kg)	Amandine Buchard (FRA)	Distria Krasniqi (KOS)	Diyora Keldiyorova (UZB)
Half-lightweight (−52 kg)	Amandine Buchard (FRA)	Distria Krasniqi (KOS)	Gefen Primo (ISR)
Lightweight (−57 kg)	Jessica Klimkait (CAN)	Sarah-Léonie Cysique (FRA)	Daria Bilodid (UKR)
Lightweight (−57 kg)	Jessica Klimkait (CAN)	Sarah-Léonie Cysique (FRA)	Haruka Funakubo (JPN)
Half-middleweight (−63 kg)	Laura Fazliu (KOS)	Miku Takaichi (JPN)	Clarisse Agbegnenou (FRA)
Half-middleweight (−63 kg)	Laura Fazliu (KOS)	Miku Takaichi (JPN)	Megumi Horikawa (JPN)
Middleweight (−70 kg)	Sanne van Dijke (NED)	Elisavet Teltsidou (GRE)	Lara Cvjetko (CRO)
Middleweight (−70 kg)	Sanne van Dijke (NED)	Elisavet Teltsidou (GRE)	Saki Niizoe (JPN)
Half-heavyweight (−78 kg)	Inbar Lanir (ISR)	Madeleine Malonga (FRA)	Yelyzaveta Lytvynenko (UKR)
Half-heavyweight (−78 kg)	Inbar Lanir (ISR)	Madeleine Malonga (FRA)	Fanny Estelle Posvite (FRA)
Heavyweight (+78 kg)	Romane Dicko (FRA)	Julia Tolofua (FRA)	Xu Shiyan (CHN)
Heavyweight (+78 kg)	Romane Dicko (FRA)	Julia Tolofua (FRA)	Kim Ha-yun (KOR)

Source results:

=== Medal table ===
* Host nation (Hungary)

Rank	Nation	Gold	Silver	Bronze	Total
1	Japan (JPN)	4	1	6	11
2	France (FRA)	2	3	3	8
3	Georgia (GEO)	1	1	4	6
4	Israel (ISR)	1	1	1	3
5	Kosovo (KOS)	1	1	0	2
6	Uzbekistan (UZB)	1	0	2	3
7	Canada (CAN)	1	0	1	2
8	Belgium (BEL)	1	0	0	1
8	Finland (FIN)	1	0	0	1
8	Netherlands (NED)	1	0	0	1
11	Tajikistan (TJK)	0	2	0	2
12	Moldova (MDA)	0	1	1	2
12	Mongolia (MGL)	0	1	1	2
14	Brazil (BRA)	0	1	0	1
14	Greece (GRE)	0	1	0	1
14	United States (USA)	0	1	0	1
17	South Korea (KOR)	0	0	3	3
18	Ukraine (UKR)	0	0	2	2
19	China (CHN)	0	0	1	1
19	Croatia (CRO)	0	0	1	1
19	Italy (ITA)	0	0	1	1
19	United Arab Emirates (UAE)	0	0	1	1
Totals (22 entries)		14	14	28	56

== Prize money ==
The sums written are per medalist, bringing the total prizes awarded to €196,000. (retrieved from:)

Medal	Total	Judoka	Coach
Gold	€6,000	€4,800	€1,200
Silver	€4,000	€3,200	€800
Bronze	€2,000	€1,600	€400
