= 2017 European Junior Judo Championships =

Judo competition

Judo 2017 European Junior Judo Championships
- Venue: Ljudski vrt
- Location: Maribor, Slovenia
- Dates: 15–17 September 2017
- Competitors: 402 from 41 nations

Champions
- Men's team: Azerbaijan
- Women's team: France

Competition at external databases
- Links: IJF • EJU • JudoInside

The 2017 European Junior Judo Championships is an edition of the European Junior Judo Championships, organised by the European Judo Union.It was held in Maribor, Slovenia from 15 to 17 September 2017. The final day of competition featured team events, with team Azerbaijan winning the men's event and team France the women's.

== Medal summary ==
=== Medal table ===
* Host nation (Slovenia)

Rank	Nation	Gold	Silver	Bronze	Total
1	Russia (RUS)	3	3	3	9
2	Azerbaijan (AZE)	3	2	2	7
3	France (FRA)	3	0	4	7
4	Netherlands (NED)	3	0	1	4
5	Germany (GER)	1	0	3	4
6	Turkey (TUR)	1	0	1	2
7	Bulgaria (BUL)	1	0	0	1
7	Slovenia (SLO)*	1	0	0	1
9	Belgium (BEL)	0	2	1	3
9	Israel (ISR)	0	2	1	3
11	Austria (AUT)	0	2	0	2
12	Georgia (GEO)	0	1	3	4
13	Italy (ITA)	0	1	2	3
14	Great Britain (GBR)	0	1	1	2
14	Ukraine (UKR)	0	1	1	2
16	Spain (ESP)	0	1	0	1
17	Romania (ROU)	0	0	2	2
18	Armenia (ARM)	0	0	1	1
18	Belarus (BLR)	0	0	1	1
18	Bosnia and Herzegovina (BIH)	0	0	1	1
18	Croatia (CRO)	0	0	1	1
18	Finland (FIN)	0	0	1	1
18	Hungary (HUN)	0	0	1	1
18	Poland (POL)	0	0	1	1
Totals (24 entries)		16	16	32	64

=== Men's events ===
Event	Gold	Silver	Bronze
−55 kg	Murtaz Sheriev (RUS)	Rashkhan Bakhishaliyev (AZE)	Theo Raoul Hebrard (FRA)
−55 kg	Murtaz Sheriev (RUS)	Rashkhan Bakhishaliyev (AZE)	Vlad Luncan (ROU)
−60 kg	Karamat Huseynov (AZE)	Jorre Verstraeten (BEL)	Ramazan Abdulaev (RUS)
−60 kg	Karamat Huseynov (AZE)	Jorre Verstraeten (BEL)	Naoufal Ez Zerrad (BEL)
−66 kg	Denislav Ivanov (BUL)	Gabriele Sulli (ITA)	Michel Adam (GER)
−66 kg	Denislav Ivanov (BUL)	Gabriele Sulli (ITA)	Oleh Ovcharenko (UKR)
−73 kg	Hidayat Heydarov (AZE)	Murad Fatiyev (AZE)	Tato Grigalashvili (GEO)
−73 kg	Hidayat Heydarov (AZE)	Murad Fatiyev (AZE)	David Gamosov (RUS)
−81 kg	Tim Gramkow (GER)	Luka Maisuradze (GEO)	Christian Parlati (ITA)
−81 kg	Tim Gramkow (GER)	Luka Maisuradze (GEO)	Jesper Smink (NED)
−90 kg	Aurélien Diesse (FRA)	Mykyta Matlashevskyi (UKR)	Grigor Sahakyan (ARM)
−90 kg	Aurélien Diesse (FRA)	Mykyta Matlashevskyi (UKR)	Jamal Petgrave (GBR)
−100 kg	Zelym Kotsoiev (AZE)	Arman Adamian (RUS)	Daniel Mukete (BLR)
−100 kg	Zelym Kotsoiev (AZE)	Arman Adamian (RUS)	Daniel Zorn (GER)
+100 kg	Inal Tasoev (RUS)	Stephan Hegyi (AUT)	Amirani Tsikoridze (GEO)
+100 kg	Inal Tasoev (RUS)	Stephan Hegyi (AUT)	Gela Zaalishvili (GEO)
Team	Azerbaijan	Georgia	Great Britain
Team	Azerbaijan	Georgia	Russia

=== Women's events ===
Event	Gold	Silver	Bronze
−44 kg	Justine Deleuil (FRA)	Loïs Petit (BEL)	Kristina Bulgakova (RUS)
−44 kg	Justine Deleuil (FRA)	Loïs Petit (BEL)	Mihaela Chiss (ROU)
−48 kg	Amber Gersjes (NED)	Laura Martinez Abelenda (ESP)	Gultaj Mammadaliyeva (AZE)
−48 kg	Amber Gersjes (NED)	Laura Martinez Abelenda (ESP)	Anais Mosdier (FRA)
−52 kg	Irem Korkmaz (TUR)	Betina Temelkova (ISR)	Gefen Primo (ISR)
−52 kg	Irem Korkmaz (TUR)	Betina Temelkova (ISR)	Nazakat Azizova (AZE)
−57 kg	Larissa Van Krevel (NED)	Acelya Toprak (GBR)	Julia Kowalczyk (POL)
−57 kg	Larissa Van Krevel (NED)	Acelya Toprak (GBR)	Sarah-Léonie Cysique (FRA)
−63 kg	Sanne Vermeer (NED)	Gili Sharir (ISR)	Dena Pohl (GER)
−63 kg	Sanne Vermeer (NED)	Gili Sharir (ISR)	Emilia Kanerva (FIN)
−70 kg	Madina Taimazova (RUS)	Michaela Polleres (AUT)	Aleksandra Samardzic (BIH)
−70 kg	Madina Taimazova (RUS)	Michaela Polleres (AUT)	Alice Bellandi (ITA)
−78 kg	Klara Apotekar (SLO)	Marina Bukreeva (RUS)	Lea Gobec (CRO)
−78 kg	Klara Apotekar (SLO)	Marina Bukreeva (RUS)	Chloé Buttigieg (FRA)
+78 kg	Romane Dicko (FRA)	Anna Gushchina (RUS)	Kubranur Esir (TUR)
+78 kg	Romane Dicko (FRA)	Anna Gushchina (RUS)	Mercedesz Szigetvári (HUN)
Team	France	Netherlands	Russia
Team	France	Netherlands	Germany

Source Results
