= 2018 Judo Grand Slam Abu Dhabi =

Judo competition

Judo 2018 Judo Grand Slam Abu Dhabi
- Venue: Mubadala Arena, Abu Dhabi
- Location: Abu Dhabi, United Arab Emirates
- Dates: 27–29 October 2018
- Competitors: 343 from 6 nations

Competition at external databases
- Links: IJF • EJU • JudoInside

The 2018 Judo Grand Slam was held in Abu Dhabi, United Arab Emirates, from 27 to 29 October 2018.

== Medal summary ==
=== Men's events ===
Event	Gold	Silver	Bronze
Extra-lightweight (−60 kg)	Amiran Papinashvili (GEO)	Francisco Garrigós (ESP)	Gusman Kyrgyzbayev (KAZ)
Extra-lightweight (−60 kg)	Amiran Papinashvili (GEO)	Francisco Garrigós (ESP)	Sharafuddin Lutfillaev (UZB)
Half-lightweight (−66 kg)	Vazha Margvelashvili (GEO)	Yerlan Serikzhanov (KAZ)	Baruch Shmailov (ISR)
Half-lightweight (−66 kg)	Vazha Margvelashvili (GEO)	Yerlan Serikzhanov (KAZ)	Dzmitry Shershan (BLR)
Lightweight (−73 kg)	Lasha Shavdatuashvili (GEO)	Akil Gjakova (KOS)	Tommy Macias (SWE)
Lightweight (−73 kg)	Lasha Shavdatuashvili (GEO)	Akil Gjakova (KOS)	Musa Mogushkov (RUS)
Half-middleweight (−81 kg)	Sagi Muki (ISR)	Matthias Casse (BEL)	Frank de Wit (NED)
Half-middleweight (−81 kg)	Sagi Muki (ISR)	Matthias Casse (BEL)	Didar Khamza (KAZ)
Middleweight (−90 kg)	Mikhail Igolnikov (RUS)	Krisztián Tóth (HUN)	Aleksandar Kukolj (SRB)
Middleweight (−90 kg)	Mikhail Igolnikov (RUS)	Krisztián Tóth (HUN)	Mammadali Mehdiyev (AZE)
Half-heavyweight (−100 kg)	Peter Paltchik (ISR)	Elmar Gasimov (AZE)	Karl-Richard Frey (GER)
Half-heavyweight (−100 kg)	Peter Paltchik (ISR)	Elmar Gasimov (AZE)	Jevgeņijs Borodavko (LAT)
Heavyweight (+100 kg)	Inal Tasoev (RUS)	Lukáš Krpálek (CZE)	Iurii Krakovetskii (KGZ)
Heavyweight (+100 kg)	Inal Tasoev (RUS)	Lukáš Krpálek (CZE)	Henk Grol (NED)

=== Women's events ===
Event	Gold	Silver	Bronze
Extra-lightweight (−48 kg)	Mönkhbatyn Urantsetseg (MGL)	Distria Krasniqi (KOS)	Paula Pareto (ARG)
Extra-lightweight (−48 kg)	Mönkhbatyn Urantsetseg (MGL)	Distria Krasniqi (KOS)	Li Yanan (CHN)
Half-lightweight (−52 kg)	Odette Giuffrida (ITA)	Majlinda Kelmendi (KOS)	Gili Cohen (ISR)
Half-lightweight (−52 kg)	Odette Giuffrida (ITA)	Majlinda Kelmendi (KOS)	Chelsie Giles (GBR)
Lightweight (−57 kg)	Nora Gjakova (KOS)	Anastasia Konkina (RUS)	Timna Nelson-Levy (ISR)
Lightweight (−57 kg)	Nora Gjakova (KOS)	Anastasia Konkina (RUS)	Priscilla Gneto (FRA)
Half-middleweight (−63 kg)	Juul Franssen (NED)	Andreja Leški (SLO)	Tina Trstenjak (SLO)
Half-middleweight (−63 kg)	Juul Franssen (NED)	Andreja Leški (SLO)	Katharina Haecker (AUS)
Middleweight (−70 kg)	Margaux Pinot (FRA)	Miriam Butkereit (GER)	Michaela Polleres (AUT)
Middleweight (−70 kg)	Margaux Pinot (FRA)	Miriam Butkereit (GER)	Giovanna Scoccimarro (GER)
Half-heavyweight (−78 kg)	Guusje Steenhuis (NED)	Natalie Powell (GBR)	Beata Pacut (POL)
Half-heavyweight (−78 kg)	Guusje Steenhuis (NED)	Natalie Powell (GBR)	Ma Zhenzhao (CHN)
Heavyweight (+78 kg)	Maryna Slutskaya (BLR)	Anne Fatoumata M'Bairo (FRA)	Iryna Kindzerska (AZE)
Heavyweight (+78 kg)	Maryna Slutskaya (BLR)	Anne Fatoumata M'Bairo (FRA)	Carolin Weiß (GER)

Source Results

=== Medal table ===
* Host nation (United Arab Emirates)

Rank	Nation	Gold	Silver	Bronze	Total
1	Georgia (GEO)	3	0	0	3
2	Russia (RUS)	2	1	1	4
3	Israel (ISR)	2	0	3	5
4	Netherlands (NED)	2	0	2	4
5	Kosovo (KOS)	1	3	0	4
6	France (FRA)	1	1	1	3
7	Belarus (BLR)	1	0	1	2
8	Italy (ITA)	1	0	0	1
8	Mongolia (MGL)	1	0	0	1
10	Germany (GER)	0	1	3	4
11	Azerbaijan (AZE)	0	1	2	3
11	Kazakhstan (KAZ)	0	1	2	3
13	Great Britain (GBR)	0	1	1	2
13	Slovenia (SLO)	0	1	1	2
15	Belgium (BEL)	0	1	0	1
15	Czech Republic (CZE)	0	1	0	1
15	Hungary (HUN)	0	1	0	1
15	Spain (ESP)	0	1	0	1
19	China (CHN)	0	0	2	2
20	Argentina (ARG)	0	0	1	1
20	Australia (AUS)	0	0	1	1
20	Austria (AUT)	0	0	1	1
20	Kyrgyzstan (KGZ)	0	0	1	1
20	Latvia (LAT)	0	0	1	1
20	Poland (POL)	0	0	1	1
20	Serbia (SRB)	0	0	1	1
20	Sweden (SWE)	0	0	1	1
20	Uzbekistan (UZB)	0	0	1	1
Totals (28 entries)		14	14	28	56
