= Cyrille Maret =

French judoka (born 1987)

Personal information
- Born: 11 August 1987 (age 39) Dijon, France
- Occupation: Judoka
- Height: 1.89 m (6 ft 2 in)
- Weight: 108 kg (238 lb)

Sport
- Country: France
- Sport: Judo
- Weight class: ‍–‍100 kg

Achievements and titles
- Olympic Games: (bronze) (2016)
- World Champ.: 5th (2015)
- European Champ.: (silver) (2017, 2018)
Medal record
Men's judo
Representing France
Olympic Games
Bronze medal – third place	2016 Rio de Janeiro	‍–‍100 kg
World Championships
Silver medal – second place	2018 Baku	Mixed team
Silver medal – second place	2019 Tokyo	Mixed team
Silver medal – second place	2021 Budapest	Mixed team
Bronze medal – third place	2017 Budapest	Mixed team
European Games
Gold medal – first place	2015 Baku	Men's team
Bronze medal – third place	2015 Baku	‍–‍100 kg
Bronze medal – third place	2019 Minsk	‍–‍100 kg
Bronze medal – third place	2019 Minsk	Mixed team
European Championships
Silver medal – second place	2007 Minsk	Men's team
Silver medal – second place	2017 Warsaw	‍–‍100 kg
Silver medal – second place	2018 Tel Aviv	‍–‍100 kg
Bronze medal – third place	2013 Budapest	‍–‍100 kg
Bronze medal – third place	2014 Montpellier	‍–‍100 kg
Bronze medal – third place	2014 Montpellier	Men's team
World Masters
Silver medal – second place	2016 Guadalajara	‍–‍100 kg
Bronze medal – third place	2013 Tyumen	‍–‍100 kg
IJF Grand Slam
Gold medal – first place	2014 Paris	‍–‍100 kg
Gold medal – first place	2015 Paris	‍–‍100 kg
Gold medal – first place	2016 Paris	‍–‍100 kg
Gold medal – first place	2017 Abu Dhabi	+100 kg
Silver medal – second place	2011 Moscow	‍–‍100 kg
Silver medal – second place	2014 Tokyo	‍–‍100 kg
Silver medal – second place	2016 Tokyo	‍–‍100 kg
Silver medal – second place	2017 Paris	‍–‍100 kg
Silver medal – second place	2021 Paris	+100 kg
Bronze medal – third place	2013 Paris	‍–‍100 kg
Bronze medal – third place	2013 Tokyo	‍–‍100 kg
Bronze medal – third place	2014 Abu Dhabi	‍–‍100 kg
Bronze medal – third place	2015 Tokyo	‍–‍100 kg
Bronze medal – third place	2018 Paris	‍–‍100 kg
IJF Grand Prix
Gold medal – first place	2013 Düsseldorf	‍–‍100 kg
Gold medal – first place	2014 Samsun	‍–‍100 kg
Bronze medal – third place	2015 Düsseldorf	‍–‍100 kg
Bronze medal – third place	2019 Perth	‍–‍100 kg
World Juniors Championships
Gold medal – first place	2006 Santo Domingo	‍–‍100 kg
European Junior Championships
Bronze medal – third place	2005 Zagreb	‍–‍100 kg
European Cadet Championships
Gold medal – first place	2003 Baku	+90 kg
Summer Universiade
Gold medal – first place	2009 Belgrade	‍–‍100 kg

Profile at external databases
- IJF: 2309
- JudoInside.com: 24862
- Updated on 24 May 2023

Cyrille Maret (born 11 August 1987) is a French judoka.

Maret won a bronze medal at the 2016 Summer Olympics in Rio de Janeiro, in the men's 100 kg.
