= Zelym Kotsoiev =

Ukrainian-Azerbaijani judoka (born 1998)

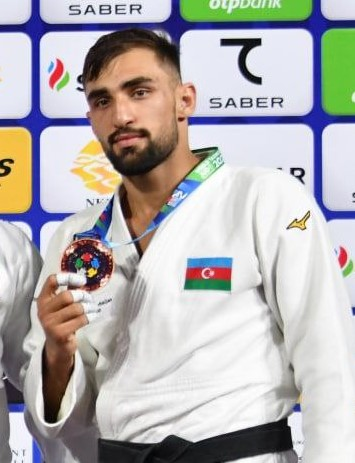
- Kotsoiev in 2022

Personal information
- Full name: Zelym Olegovich Kotsoiev
- Born: 9 August 1998 (age 28) Vladikavkaz, North Ossetia-Alania, Russia
- Occupation: Judoka

Sport
- Country: Ukraine (until 2014); Azerbaijan (since 2015)
- Sport: Judo
- Weight class: ‍–‍100 kg

Achievements and titles
- Olympic Games: (gold) (2024)
- World Champ.: (gold) (2024)
- European Champ.: (gold) (2023)
- Highest world ranking: 1^{st}
Medal record
Men's judo
Representing Azerbaijan
Olympic Games
Gold medal – first place	2024 Paris	‍–‍100 kg
World Championships
Gold medal – first place	2024 Abu Dhabi	‍–‍100 kg
Bronze medal – third place	2022 Tashkent	‍–‍100 kg
Bronze medal – third place	2023 Doha	‍–‍100 kg
Bronze medal – third place	2025 Budapest	‍–‍100 kg
European Championships
Gold medal – first place	2023 Montpellier	‍–‍100 kg
Silver medal – second place	2025 Podgorica	‍–‍100 kg
Bronze medal – third place	2018 Tel Aviv	‍–‍100 kg
Bronze medal – third place	2020 Prague	‍–‍100 kg
Bronze medal – third place	2021 Lisbon	‍–‍100 kg
World Masters
Silver medal – second place	2021 Doha	‍–‍100 kg
Bronze medal – third place	2022 Jerusalem	‍–‍100 kg
IJF Grand Slam
Gold medal – first place	2021 Antalya	‍–‍100 kg
Gold medal – first place	2022 Baku	‍–‍100 kg
Gold medal – first place	2023 Tel Aviv	‍–‍100 kg
Silver medal – second place	2019 Abu Dhabi	‍–‍100 kg
Bronze medal – third place	2019 Düsseldorf	‍–‍100 kg
Bronze medal – third place	2019 Baku	‍–‍100 kg
Bronze medal – third place	2020 Düsseldorf	‍–‍100 kg
Bronze medal – third place	2022 Tel Aviv	‍–‍100 kg
Bronze medal – third place	2023 Paris	‍–‍100 kg
Bronze medal – third place	2023 Baku	‍–‍100 kg
Bronze medal – third place	2023 Tokyo	‍–‍100 kg
Bronze medal – third place	2026 Tashkent	‍–‍100 kg
Bronze medal – third place	2026 Ulaanbaatar	‍–‍100 kg
IJF Grand Prix
Gold medal – first place	2016 Ulaanbaatar	‍–‍100 kg
Gold medal – first place	2018 Antalya	‍–‍100 kg
Gold medal – first place	2025 Guadalajara	‍–‍100 kg
Silver medal – second place	2019 Tashkent	‍–‍100 kg
World Juniors Championships
Gold medal – first place	2017 Zagreb	‍–‍100 kg
European Junior Championships
Gold medal – first place	2017 Maribor	‍–‍100 kg
World Cadets Championships
Silver medal – second place	2015 Sarajevo	‍–‍90 kg
European Cadet Championships
Gold medal – first place	2015 Sofia	‍–‍90 kg
Summer Universiade
Gold medal – first place	2017 Taipei	‍–‍100 kg
Representing Ukraine
European Cadet Championships
Gold medal – first place	2014 Athens	‍–‍90 kg
Bronze medal – third place	2013 Tallinn	‍–‍90 kg

Profile at external databases
- IJF: 25741, 13789
- JudoInside.com: 45652
- Updated on 21 June 2026

Zelym Olegovich Kotsoiev (Russian: Зелим Олегович Коцоев (born 9 August 1998)) is a Ukrainian-Azerbaijani judoka of Ossetian heritage. He won the gold medal in the men's 100 kg event at the 2024 Summer Olympics held in Paris, France. He is a three-time medalist, including gold, at the World Judo Championships and a four-time medalist, including gold, at the European Judo Championships.

At the European Cadet Championships held in Athens, Greece in July 2014, Kotsoev became the youngest champion of the tournament, at 15 years and 331 days old.

In December 2014, 16-year-old Kotsoev became the winner of the first U18 World SAMBO Championship.

== Career ==
Kotsoiev won the gold medal in the men's 100 kg event at the 2017 Summer Universiade held in Taipei, Taiwan.

Kotsoiev won one of the bronze medals in the men's 100 kg event at the 2020 European Championships held in Prague, Czech Republic.

Kotsoiev won the silver medal in his event at the 2021 World Masters held in Doha, Qatar. A few months later, he won the gold medal in his event at the 2021 Antalya Grand Slam held in Antalya, Turkey.

Kotsoiev won one of the bronze medals in his event at the 2022 Tel Aviv Grand Slam held in Tel Aviv, Israel.

In February-March 2026, at the Grand Slam tournament competitions held in the capital of Uzbekistan, Tashkent, Zelim Kotsoev (100 kg) took third place, defeating his Russian opponent Adam Sangariev by ippon.

As of April 1, 2026, with a score of 440 points, holds third place in the ranking of Azerbaijani athletes according to the Ministry of Youth and Sports.

At the 2026 World Judo Championships in Baku, Zelim Kotsoev defeated Turkmenistan's representative Baymirat Mazhanov by ippon in the 1/32 finals, in the 1/16 finals he defeated Slovak athlete Benyamin Matasey by ippon, but in the 1/8 finals he lost to Russia's representative Arman Adamyan and was eliminated from the tournament.

== Achievements ==
Year	Tournament	Place	Weight class
2018	European Championships	3rd	‍–‍100 kg
2020	European Championships	3rd	‍–‍100 kg
2021	European Championships	3rd	‍–‍100 kg
2022	World Championships	3rd	‍–‍100 kg
2023	World Championships	3rd	‍–‍100 kg
2023	European Championships	1st	‍–‍100 kg
2024	World Championships	1st	‍–‍100 kg
2024	Summer Olympics	1st	‍–‍100 kg
