= Kazbek Zankishiev =

Russian judoka (1992–2024)

Personal information
- Full name: Kazbek Kubadiyevich Zankishiev
- Born: 23 May 1992
- Died: 2 March 2024 (aged 31)
- Occupation: Judoka

Sport
- Country: Russia
- Sport: Judo
- Weight class: ‍–‍90 kg, ‍–‍100 kg

Achievements and titles
- World Champ.: 7th (2017)
- European Champ.: (bronze) (2017)
Medal record
Men's judo
Representing Russia
World Championships
Bronze medal – third place	2018 Baku	Mixed team
European Games
Gold medal – first place	2019 Minsk	Mixed team
European Championships
Bronze medal – third place	2017 Warsaw	‍–‍100 kg
IJF Grand Slam
Silver medal – second place	2019 Baku	‍–‍100 kg
Bronze medal – third place	2015 Tyumen	‍–‍90 kg
Bronze medal – third place	2016 Tyumen	‍–‍100 kg
IJF Grand Prix
Gold medal – first place	2017 Tbilisi	‍–‍100 kg
Gold medal – first place	2017 The Hague	‍–‍100 kg
Gold medal – first place	2019 Tbilisi	‍–‍100 kg
Gold medal – first place	2019 Tashkent	‍–‍100 kg
Silver medal – second place	2015 Düsseldorf	‍–‍90 kg
Silver medal – second place	2018 Hohhot	‍–‍100 kg
Bronze medal – third place	2017 Düsseldorf	‍–‍100 kg
Bronze medal – third place	2017 Hohhot	‍–‍100 kg
European U23 Championships
Gold medal – first place	2014 Wrocław	‍–‍90 kg
World Juniors Championships
Gold medal – first place	2011 Cape Town	‍–‍90 kg

Profile at external databases
- IJF: 9248
- JudoInside.com: 65378
- Updated on 11 November 2022

Kazbek Kubadiyevich Zankishiev (Russian: Казбек Кубадиевич Занкишиев; 23 May 1992 – 2 March 2024) was a Russian judoka. He was a 2017 European bronze medalist in the ‍–‍100 kg division. Zankishiev died on 2 March 2024, at the age of 31.
