= Daniel Mukete =

Belarusian judoka (born 1997)

Personal information
- Born: 23 October 1997 (age 28)
- Occupation: Judoka

Sport
- Country: Belarus
- Sport: Judo
- Weight class: ‍–‍100 kg

Achievements and titles
- World Champ.: R32 (2018)
- European Champ.: 5th (2018, 2019)
Medal record
Men's judo
Representing Belarus
IJF Grand Slam
Bronze medal – third place	2018 Ekaterinburg	‍–‍100 kg
IJF Grand Prix
Bronze medal – third place	2019 Tashkent	‍–‍100 kg
European U23 Championships
Gold medal – first place	2017 Podgorica	‍–‍100 kg
Gold medal – first place	2019 Izhevsk	‍–‍100 kg
European Junior Championships
Bronze medal – third place	2017 Maribor	‍–‍100 kg

Profile at external databases
- IJF: 19662
- JudoInside.com: 42433
- Updated on 26 November 2022

Daniel Mukete (born 23 October 1997) is a Belarusian judoka.

Mukete is a bronze medalist from the 2018 Judo Grand Slam Ekaterinburg in the ‍–‍100 kg category.
