= Giuliano Loporchio =

Italian judoka (born 1991)

Personal information
- Born: 11 December 1991 (age 34)
- Occupation: Judoka

Sport
- Country: Italy
- Sport: Judo
- Weight class: ‍–‍90 kg, ‍–‍100 kg

Achievements and titles
- European Champ.: R32 (2018, 2019)
Medal record
Men's judo
Representing Italy
IJF Grand Prix
Silver medal – second place	2013 Rijeka	‍–‍90 kg
Bronze medal – third place	2017 Zagreb	‍–‍100 kg
European U23 Championships
Bronze medal – third place	2013 Samokov	‍–‍90 kg

Profile at external databases
- IJF: 7389
- JudoInside.com: 45732
- Updated on 7 December 2022

Giuliano Loporchio (born 11 December 1991) is an Italian judoka.

Loporchio is a bronze medalist from the 2017 Judo Grand Prix Zagreb in the ‍–‍100 kg category.
