= Kyle Reyes =

Canadian judoka (born 1993)

Personal information
- Born: 10 October 1993 (age 32) Brampton, Ontario, Canada
- Occupation: Judoka

Sport
- Country: Canada
- Sport: Judo
- Weight class: ‍–‍100 kg

Achievements and titles
- World Champ.: (silver) (2022)
- Pan American Champ.: (gold) (2021)
- Commonwealth Games: (gold) (2026)
Medal record
Men's judo
Representing Canada
World Championships
| Silver medal – second place | 2022 Tashkent | ‍–‍100 kg |
Pan American Championships
| Gold medal – first place | 2021 Guadalajara | ‍–‍100 kg |
| Silver medal – second place | 2016 Havana | ‍–‍100 kg |
| Silver medal – second place | 2024 Rio de Janeiro | ‍–‍100 kg |
| Bronze medal – third place | 2015 Edmonton | ‍–‍100 kg |
| Bronze medal – third place | 2020 Guadalajara | ‍–‍100 kg |
World Masters
| Bronze medal – third place | 2023 Budapest | ‍–‍100 kg |
IJF Grand Slam
| Gold medal – first place | 2022 Abu Dhabi | ‍–‍100 kg |
| Silver medal – second place | 2013 Tokyo | ‍–‍100 kg |
| Silver medal – second place | 2014 Tyumen | ‍–‍100 kg |
| Silver medal – second place | 2016 Paris | ‍–‍100 kg |
| Bronze medal – third place | 2023 Tel Aviv | ‍–‍100 kg |
| Bronze medal – third place | 2023 Antalya | ‍–‍100 kg |
| Bronze medal – third place | 2024 Tokyo | ‍–‍100 kg |
| Bronze medal – third place | 2025 Tbilisi | ‍–‍100 kg |
IJF Grand Prix
| Silver medal – second place | 2018 Zagreb | ‍–‍100 kg |
| Bronze medal – third place | 2019 Montreal | ‍–‍100 kg |
World Juniors Championships
| Gold medal – first place | 2013 Ljubljana | ‍–‍100 kg |
Commonwealth Games
| Gold medal – first place | 2026 Glasgow | ‍–‍100 kg |
| Silver medal – second place | 2022 Birmingham | ‍–‍100 kg |

Profile at external databases
- IJF: 11254
- JudoInside.com: 87201
- Updated on 3 August 2026

Kyle Reyes (born 10 October 1993) is a Canadian judoka who competes in the men's 100 kg category. Reyes was born in Brampton, Ontario, Canada.

Reyes won the gold medal the 2013 World Junior Championships in Ljubljana, became the first Canadian judoka to win a World Junior Championships gold medal.

In June 2016, he was named to Canada's Olympic team.

While born in Brampton, he was raised in Toronto.

== See also ==
- Judo in Ontario
- Judo in Canada
- List of Canadian judoka
