= Arman Adamian =

Russian judoka (born 1997)

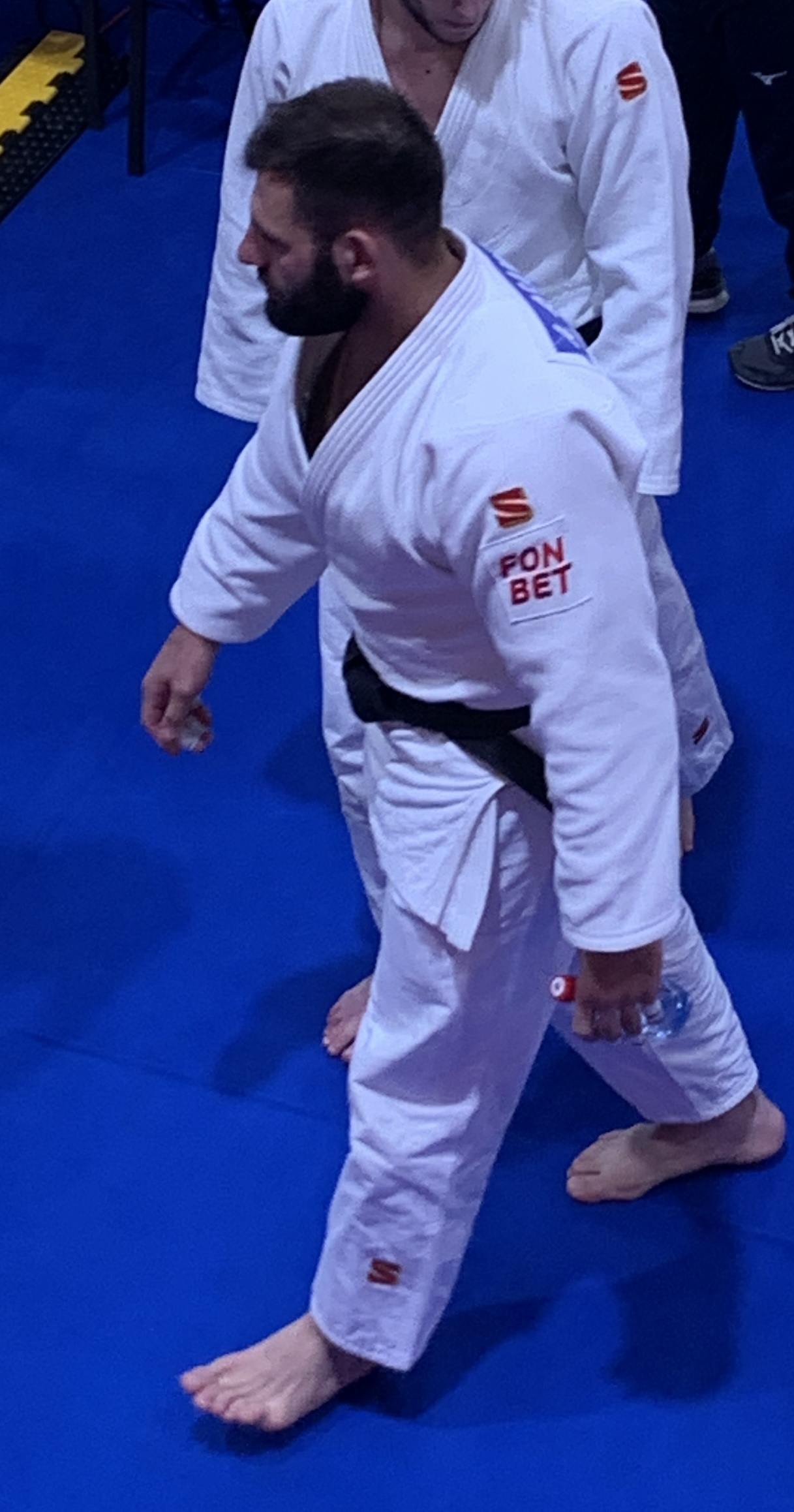

Personal information
- Full name: Arman Azatovich Adamian
- Born: 14 February 1997 (age 29)
- Occupation: Judoka

Sport
- Country: Russia
- Sport: Judo
- Weight class: –100 kg

Achievements and titles
- World Champ.: (2023)
- European Champ.: (gold) (2019)
Medal record
Men's judo
Representing the IJF
World Championships
Bronze medal – third place	2025 Budapest	‍–‍100 kg
IJF Grand Slam
Bronze medal – third place	2024 Abu Dhabi	‍–‍100 kg
Bronze medal – third place	2025 Paris	‍–‍100 kg
Bronze medal – third place	2025 Tbilisi	‍–‍100 kg
Representing Individual Neutral Athletes
World Championships
Gold medal – first place	2023 Doha	‍–‍100 kg
IJF Grand Slam
Gold medal – first place	2023 Abu Dhabi	‍–‍100 kg
Bronze medal – third place	2023 Ulaanbaatar	‍–‍100 kg
Representing Russia
European Games
Gold medal – first place	2019 Minsk	‍–‍100 kg
European Championships
Silver medal – second place	2020 Prague	‍–‍100 kg
Bronze medal – third place	2026 Tbilisi	‍–‍100 kg
World Masters
Bronze medal – third place	2021 Doha	‍–‍100 kg
IJF Grand Slam
Gold medal – first place	2019 Ekaterinburg	‍–‍100 kg
Gold medal – first place	2021 Paris	‍–‍100 kg
Gold medal – first place	2021 Abu Dhabi	‍–‍100 kg
Gold medal – first place	2025 Abu Dhabi	‍–‍100 kg
Silver medal – second place	2020 Budapest	‍–‍100 kg
Silver medal – second place	2021 Kazan	‍–‍100 kg
Bronze medal – third place	2019 Abu Dhabi	‍–‍100 kg
Bronze medal – third place	2020 Paris	‍–‍100 kg
Bronze medal – third place	2021 Antalya	‍–‍100 kg
IJF Grand Prix
Gold medal – first place	2021 Zagreb	‍–‍100 kg
Silver medal – second place	2018 Antalya	‍–‍100 kg
European U23 Championships
Gold medal – first place	2018 Győr	‍–‍100 kg
World Juniors Championships
Silver medal – second place	2017 Zagreb	‍–‍100 kg
European Junior Championships
Silver medal – second place	2017 Maribor	‍–‍100 kg
Bronze medal – third place	2016 Málaga	‍–‍100 kg

Profile at external databases
- IJF: 23336
- JudoInside.com: 97816
- Updated on 19 April 2026

Arman Azatovich Adamian (Russian: Арман Азатович Адамян; born 14 February 1997) is a Russian judoka and 2023 world champion in the men's 100 kg. He also won the gold medal in the men's 100 kg event at the 2019 European Games held in Minsk, Belarus.

In 2018, Adamian won the silver medal in the men's 100 kg event at the Judo Grand Prix Antalya held in Antalya, Turkey. In that same year, he won the gold medal in the men's 100 kg event at the 2018 European U23 Judo Championships held in Győr, Hungary. In 2020, he won the silver medal in the men's 100 kg event at the European Judo Championships held in Prague, Czech Republic.

In 2021, Adamian won one of the bronze medals in his signature event at the Judo World Masters held in Doha, Qatar. At the 2021 Judo Grand Slam Abu Dhabi held in Abu Dhabi, United Arab Emirates, he won the gold medal in the 100 kg event.
