= Miklós Cirjenics =

Hungarian judoka (born 1990)

Personal information
- Born: 11 March 1990 (age 36) Pécs
- Occupation: Judoka
- Height: 1.90 m (6 ft 3 in)

Sport
- Country: Hungary
- Sport: Judo
- Weight class: ‍–‍100 kg

Achievements and titles
- Olympic Games: R16 (2020)
- World Champ.: R32 (2017, 2021)
- European Champ.: R16 (2013, 2014, 2017, 2018, 2020)
Medal record
Men's judo
Representing Hungary
World Masters
Bronze medal – third place	2017 Saint Petersburg	‍–‍100 kg
IJF Grand Slam
Gold medal – first place	2017 Ekaterinburg	‍–‍100 kg
Silver medal – second place	2016 Baku	‍–‍100 kg
Bronze medal – third place	2017 Baku	‍–‍100 kg
Bronze medal – third place	2017 Tokyo	‍–‍100 kg
Bronze medal – third place	2019 Brasilia	‍–‍100 kg
Bronze medal – third place	2020 Düsseldorf	‍–‍100 kg
IJF Grand Prix
Gold medal – first place	2017 Zagreb	‍–‍100 kg
Bronze medal – third place	2014 Astana	‍–‍100 kg
Bronze medal – third place	2016 Havana	‍–‍100 kg
Bronze medal – third place	2016 Samsun	‍–‍100 kg
Summer Universiade
Bronze medal – third place	2013 Kazan	Men's team

Profile at external databases
- IJF: 10361
- JudoInside.com: 50016
- Updated on 20 November 2022

Miklós Cirjenics (born 11 March 1990) is a Hungarian judoka. He represented his country at the 2016 Summer Olympics.
