= Shady Elnahas =

Canadian judoka (born 1998)

Personal information
- Nationality: Canadian
- Born: 27 March 1998 (age 28) Alexandria, Egypt
- Home town: Toronto, Ontario
- Occupation: Judoka
- Height: 192 cm (6 ft 4 in)

Sport
- Country: Canada
- Sport: Judo
- Weight class: ‍–‍100 kg
- Retired: 21 February 2025

Achievements and titles
- Olympic Games: 5th (2020)
- World Champ.: (silver) (2024)
- Pan American Champ.: (gold) (2019, 2020, 2022, 2023, 2024)
- Commonwealth Games: (gold) (2022)
Medal record
Men's judo
Representing Canada
World Championships
Silver medal – second place	2024 Abu Dhabi	‍–‍100 kg
Pan American Games
Gold medal – first place	2023 Santiago	‍–‍100 kg
Pan American Championships
Gold medal – first place	2019 Lima	‍–‍100 kg
Gold medal – first place	2020 Guadalajara	‍–‍100 kg
Gold medal – first place	2022 Lima	‍–‍100 kg
Gold medal – first place	2023 Calgary	‍–‍100 kg
Gold medal – first place	2024 Rio de Janeiro	‍–‍100 kg
IJF Grand Slam
Gold medal – first place	2021 Tbilisi	‍–‍100 kg
Silver medal – second place	2018 Osaka	‍–‍100 kg
Silver medal – second place	2021 Baku	‍–‍100 kg
Silver medal – second place	2024 Tbilisi	‍–‍100 kg
Silver medal – second place	2024 Antalya	‍–‍100 kg
Bronze medal – third place	2019 Ekaterinburg	‍–‍100 kg
Bronze medal – third place	2019 Abu Dhabi	‍–‍100 kg
Bronze medal – third place	2020 Budapest	‍–‍100 kg
Bronze medal – third place	2021 Abu Dhabi	‍–‍100 kg
Bronze medal – third place	2022 Abu Dhabi	‍–‍100 kg
Bronze medal – third place	2023 Tbilisi	‍–‍100 kg
Bronze medal – third place	2023 Abu Dhabi	‍–‍100 kg
IJF Grand Prix
Gold medal – first place	2019 Zagreb	‍–‍100 kg
Silver medal – second place	2019 Montreal	‍–‍100 kg
Commonwealth Games
Gold medal – first place	2022 Birmingham	‍–‍100 kg

Profile at external databases
- IJF: 36058
- JudoInside.com: 23678
- Updated on 24 May 2024

Shady Elnahas (born 27 March 1998) is a Canadian professional wrestler and retired judoka. He is the reigning Commonwealth Games champion, having won gold in 2022, and a former five-time Pan American Games champion, winning his most recent gold in 2024 in the 100 kg or less category. He is signed to WWE, using the name Shido Ash.

== Judo career ==
When Elnahas was young, he immigrated to Canada from Egypt, and took up the sport of judo for self-defence against bullying at school.

Elnahas won silver at the 2018 Osaka Grand Slam in November, and the following year he followed that up with a bronze at the 2019 Ekaterinburg Grand Slam.

Elnahas also won gold at the 2019 Pan American Championships in Lima, Peru and in at the 2020 in Guadalajara.

In June 2021, Elnahas was named to Canada's 2020 Olympic team.

== Professional wrestling career ==
On May 16, 2025, the WWE announced that Elnahas had joined the WWE Performance Center as a WWE NXT recruit.

== Personal life ==
Elnahas was born in Alexandria, Egypt and moved to Canada with his family at the age of 12. The family initially lived in Toronto though he moved to Montreal to join the national Canadian judo team where he trains with them today. In Toronto, Elnahas attended École secondaire Étienne-Brûlé. His older brother Mohab is also a member of the national Canadian judo team. He is a citizen of Canada and Egypt, though he resides in Orlando.

Elnahas is currently in a relationship with fellow WWE wrestler Tiffany Stratton.

== See also ==
- Judo in Ontario
- Judo in Canada
- List of Canadian judoka
