= Elmar Gasimov =

Azerbaijani Olympic judoka (born 1990)

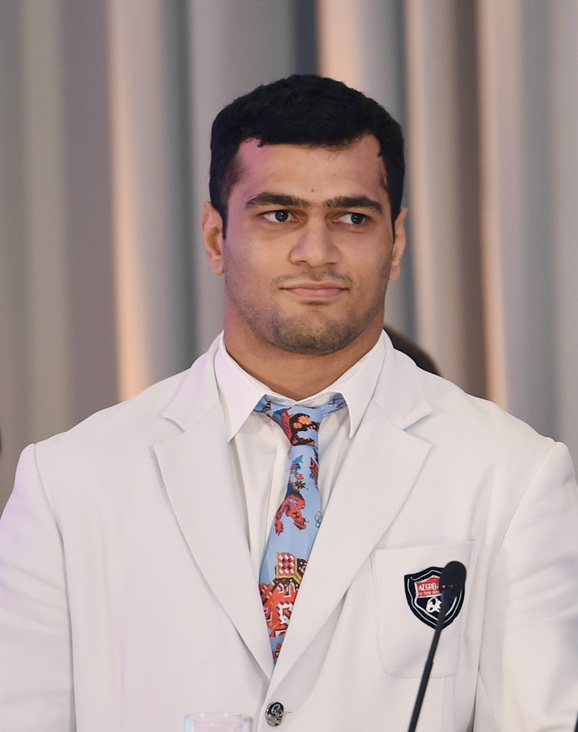
- Gasimov after 2016 Olympics

Personal information
- Nationality: Azerbaijani
- Born: 2 November 1990 (age 35) Xırdalan, Azerbaijani SSR
- Occupation: Judoka
- Height: 188 cm (6 ft 2 in)

Sport
- Country: Azerbaijan
- Sport: Judo
- Weight class: –100 kg

Achievements and titles
- Olympic Games: (silver) (2016)
- World Champ.: (bronze) (2017)
- European Champ.: (silver) (2014)
Medal record
Men's judo
Representing Azerbaijan
Olympic Games
Silver medal – second place	2016 Rio de Janeiro	‍–‍100 kg
World Championships
Bronze medal – third place	2017 Budapest	‍–‍100 kg
European Games
Bronze medal – third place	2019 Minsk	‍–‍100 kg
European Championships
Silver medal – second place	2014 Montpellier	‍–‍100 kg
Bronze medal – third place	2012 Chelyabinsk	‍–‍100 kg
World Masters
Gold medal – first place	2015 Rabat	‍–‍100 kg
Gold medal – first place	2016 Guadalajara	‍–‍100 kg
Bronze medal – third place	2013 Tyumen	‍–‍100 kg
IJF Grand Slam
Gold medal – first place	2014 Tyumen	‍–‍100 kg
Silver medal – second place	2015 Baku	‍–‍100 kg
Silver medal – second place	2017 Baku	‍–‍100 kg
Silver medal – second place	2018 Abu Dhabi	‍–‍100 kg
Silver medal – second place	2019 Osaka	‍–‍100 kg
Silver medal – second place	2020 Düsseldorf	‍–‍100 kg
Bronze medal – third place	2013 Baku	‍–‍100 kg
Bronze medal – third place	2015 Tokyo	‍–‍100 kg
Bronze medal – third place	2022 Antalya	‍–‍100 kg
IJF Grand Prix
Gold medal – first place	2015 Tbilisi	‍–‍100 kg
Gold medal – first place	2015 Samsun	‍–‍100 kg
Gold medal – first place	2018 Tashkent	‍–‍100 kg
Silver medal – second place	2013 Samsun	‍–‍100 kg
Bronze medal – third place	2014 Tbilisi	‍–‍100 kg
Bronze medal – third place	2014 Budapest	‍–‍100 kg
Bronze medal – third place	2015 Qingdao	‍–‍100 kg
Bronze medal – third place	2015 Jeju	‍–‍100 kg
Bronze medal – third place	2019 Antalya	‍–‍100 kg
European Junior Championships
Gold medal – first place	2009 Yerevan	‍–‍100 kg
Islamic Solidarity Games
Gold medal – first place	2021 Konya	Men's team
Silver medal – second place	2017 Baku	‍–‍100 kg
Silver medal – second place	2021 Konya	‍–‍100 kg

Profile at external databases
- IJF: 20
- JudoInside.com: 47815
- Updated on 24 May 2023

Elmar Gasimov (Azerbaijani: Elmar Qasimov, born 2 November 1990) is an Azerbaijani judoka, who competes in the -100 kg division. He has competed at the 2012 and 2016 Olympics and won a silver medal in 2016. He has also won a bronze at the 2017 World Championships, and a silver (2014) and two bronze medals (2012 and 2019) at European Judo Championships.

He also won a gold medal at the 2009 European Youth Championship in Yerevan, after defeating Lukáš Krpálek in the final. He would lose to Krpálek in the finals of the 2014 European Championships and of the 2016 Olympics.

Gasimov narrowly missed out on a second bronze medal at the 2019 World Championships, losing to Aaron Wolf with 33 seconds left in the bronze medal match. He began practising judo in 1999.

== Biography ==
Elmar Gasimov was born on November 2, 1990, in Khirdalan, Azerbaijan. Elmar Gasimov has been doing sports since 2000.

== Career ==
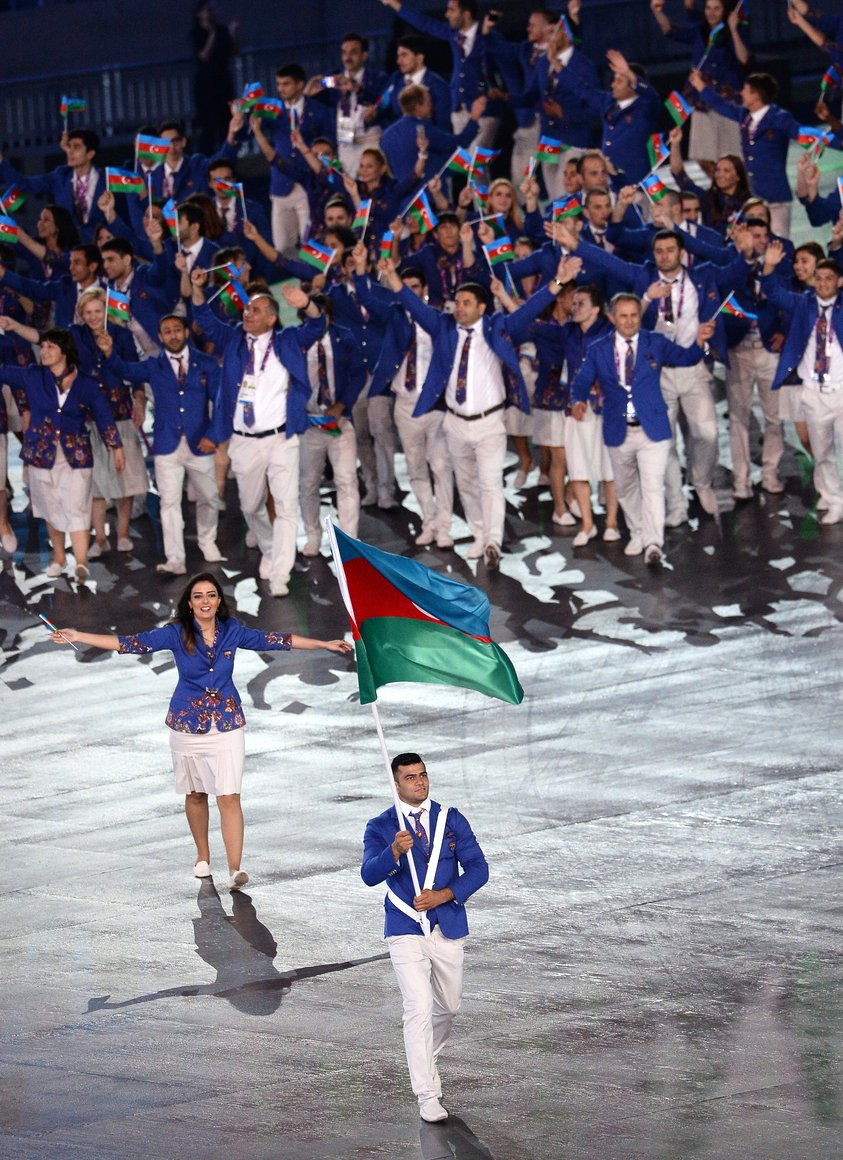

Elmar Gasimov had his first success in 2007. He won a silver medal at the U-20 Azerbaijan Championship and a bronze medal at the U23 Azerbaijan Championship. In the same year, he was 3rd in the Azerbaijan Championship. In 2008 he already participated in international competitions. Elmar Gasimov placed 7th at the U-20 World Championship. After 1 year, in 2009, Elmar Gasimov became known in Azerbaijan. He won a gold medal at the European Youth Championship held in Yerevan, the capital of Armenia, and the Azerbaijani National Anthem was played in his honor in Yerevan.

Elmar Gasimov won a gold medal at the Tbilisi and Samsun Grand Prix in 2015, and a bronze medal at the Qingdao, Jeju and Tokyo Grand Prix. In the same year, he represented Azerbaijan at the 1st European Games. At the opening ceremony of these competitions, Gasimov served as the flag bearer of Azerbaijan. He lost to Jorge Fonseca of Portugal by ippon in the 1/16 final.

Elmar Gasimov ranked 5th at the 2016 European Championships held in Kazan, Russia.

In October 2026, he won a bronze medal at the international tournament Aktau Asian Open 2026.
