= Aaron Fara =

Austrian judoka (born 1997)

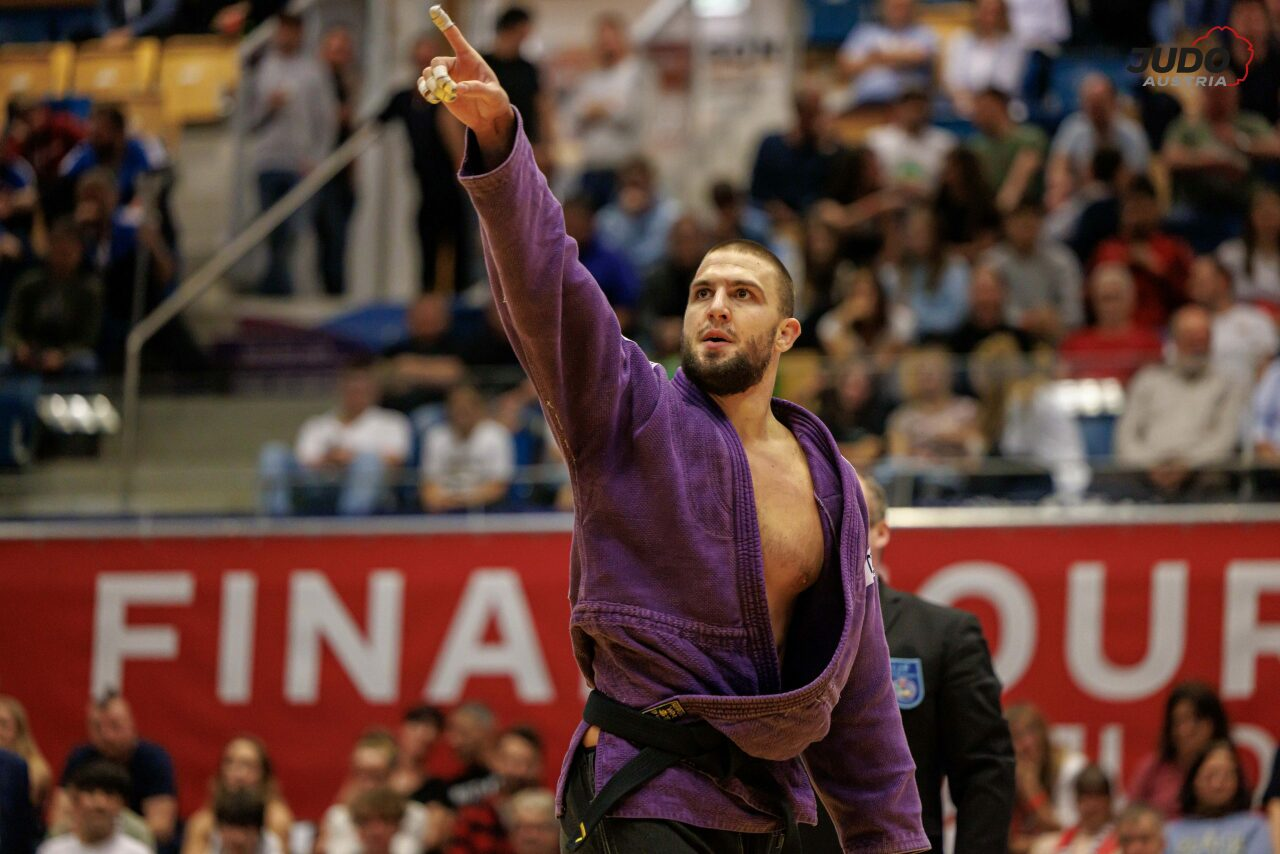

Personal information
- Born: 21 June 1997 (age 29)
- Occupation: Judoka

Sport
- Country: Austria
- Sport: Judo
- Weight class: ‍–‍100 kg
- Rank: 3rd dan black belt
- League: Erste Judo Bundesliga
- Club: Galaxy Judo Tigers; JC Wimpassing
- Team: LZ Wels
- Retired: 26 January 2025

Achievements and titles
- Olympic Games: R32 (2024)
- World Champ.: R16 (2019, 2023)
- European Champ.: 7th (2018, 2023)
Medal record
Men's judo
Representing Austria
IJF Grand Slam
Gold medal – first place	2023 Antalya	‍–‍100 kg
Silver medal – second place	2023 Tashkent	‍–‍100 kg
Bronze medal – third place	2023 Abu Dhabi	‍–‍100 kg
IJF Grand Prix
Bronze medal – third place	2018 Cancún	‍–‍100 kg
European U23 Championships
Bronze medal – third place	2017 Podgorica	‍–‍100 kg
European Junior Championships
Gold medal – first place	2016 Málaga	‍–‍100 kg
European Cadet Championships
Bronze medal – third place	2014 Athens	‍–‍90 kg

Profile at external databases
- IJF: 22682
- JudoInside.com: 87891
- Updated on 3 August 2024

Aaron Fara (born 21 June 1997) is an Austrian professional wrestler and former judoka. He is signed to American professional wrestling promotion WWE, using the name Viktor Zanov.

== Judo career ==
Fara's home club is the JC Wimpassing. In 2013 he passed the Shodan exam. In 2015 he moved to the Galaxy Judo Tigers in Perchtoldsdorf. The Bad Erlach native completed an apprenticeship as a masseur and attended the vocational school for hair and body care in Vienna. In 2017 he returned to the JC Wimpassing. In September 2016 he won the European Junior Championship title in Málaga.

In October 2021, he became national champion in the adult category in the weight class up to 100 kilograms for the first time, after having been Austrian champion three times as a junior. Fara won his first medal at a Judo World Tour event in October 2018, when he finished third in the Grand Prix Cancún (Mexico). In 2023, he finished second at the Grand Slam Tashkent at the beginning of March, and just under a month later he achieved his first tournament victory at a World Tour event at the Grand Slam in Antalya. At the 2024 Grand Prix Linz, he sustained a meniscus injury.

He took part in the 2024 Olympic Games in both the ‍–‍100 kg weight class and in the mixed team (together with Katharina Tanzer, Lubjana Piovesana, Michaela Polleres, Samuel Gaßner and Wachid Borchashvili). In the individual competition, he was defeated in the first round by defending Olympic champion Aaron Wolf from Japan. Fara and Austria lost the first encounter in the mixed team competition against Germany 1:4 and finished in ninth place.

For his participation in the Olympic Games, he was awarded the Sandan by Judo Austria.

== Awards ==
- Austria's Male Judoka of the Year 2023
