= 2016 African Judo Championships =

Judo competition

The 2016 African Judo Championships were the 37th edition of the African Judo Championships, and were held in Tunis, Tunisia from 8 to 10 April 2016.

The winners qualified for the 2016 Summer Olympics.

== Medals table ==
Rank	Nation	Gold	Silver	Bronze	Total
1	Tunisia	5	4	7	16
2	Egypt	4	2	1	7
3	Algeria	2	5	11	18
4	Cameroon	2	2	3	7
5	Morocco	2	2	1	5
6	Guinea-Bissau	1	0	0	1
7	South Africa	0	1	0	1
8	Ivory Coast	0	0	2	2
8	Senegal	0	0	2	2
10	Angola	0	0	1	1
10	Gabon	0	0	1	1
10	Ghana	0	0	1	1
10	Libya	0	0	1	1
10	Madagascar	0	0	1	1
Totals (14 entries)		16	16	32	64

== Medal overview ==
=== Men ===
Event	Gold	Silver	Bronze
60 kg	Ahmed Abelrahman (EGY)	Fraj Dhouibi (TUN)	Mohamed Elhadi El Kawisah (LBA); Salim Rabahi (ALG)
66 kg	Imad Bassou (MAR)	Mohamed Abdelmawgoud (EGY)	Bassem Mtiri (TUN); Houd Zourdani (ALG)
73 kg	Mohamed Mohyeldin (EGY)	Ahmed El Meziati (MAR)	Fethi Nourine (ALG); Hamza Barhoumi (TUN)
81 kg	Mohamed Abdelaal (EGY)	Ali Hazem (EGY)	Abdelaziz Ben Ammar (TUN); Hamza Drid (ALG)
90 kg	Abderahmane Benamadi (ALG)	Zack Piontek (RSA)	Oussama Mahmoud Snoussi (TUN); Imad Abdellaoui (MAR)
100 kg	Ramadan Darwish (EGY)	Lyes Bouyacoub (ALG)	Anis Ben Khaled (TUN); Seidou Nji Mouluh (CMR)
+100 kg	Faicel Jaballah (TUN)	Mohammed Tayeb (ALG)	Mohamed El Mehdi Lili (ALG); Ahmed Wahid (EGY)
Open class	Faicel Jaballah (TUN)	Dieudonne Dolassem (CMR)	Mohamed Sofiane Belrekaa (ALG); Seidou Nji Mouluh (CMR)

== 60 kg ==
=== Finals ===
Semifinals		Final
Nayr Garcia Pedro (ANG)	000
Ahmed Abelrahman (EGY)	000	Ahmed Abelrahman (EGY)	001
Fraj Dhouibi (TUN)	100	Fraj Dhouibi (TUN)	000
Mohamed Elhadi El Kawisah (LBA)	000

=== Pool A ===
First Round
Jean Michel Vidot (SEY)	000
Moctar Allassane (NIG)	100
Nayr Garcia Pedro (ANG)	100
Ismaila Diatta (SEN)	000

Second Round
Yassine Moudatir (MAR)	100
Moctar Allassane (NIG)	000
Gavin Mogopa (BOT)	000
Nayr Garcia Pedro (ANG)	100

Quarterfinals
Yassine Moudatir (MAR)	010
Nayr Garcia Pedro (ANG)	100

=== Pool B ===
First Round		Second Round		Quarterfinals
		Bernadin Tsala Tsala (CMR)	000
Fabrice Kwizera (BDI)	000	Kalifara Drabo (BUR)	000
Kalifara Drabo (BUR)	100			Bernadin Tsala Tsala (CMR)	000
				Ahmed Abelrahman (EGY)	000
		Ahmed Abelrahman (EGY)	100
		Boura Malloum Ibrahim (CHA)	000

=== Pool C ===
First Round
Birama Traore (MLI)	000
Salim Rabahi (ALG)	100

Second Round
Fraj Dhouibi (TUN)	101
Ibrahim Issa Sani (CHA)	000
Neuso Sigauque (MOZ)	000
Salim Rabahi (ALG)	100

Quarterfinals
Fraj Dhouibi (TUN)	000
Salim Rabahi (ALG)	000

=== Pool D ===
First Round		Second Round		Quarterfinals
		Mohamed Elhadi El Kawisah (LBA)	100
Ismael Alhassane (NIG)	010	Ismael Alhassane (NIG)	000
Dario Francisco Dala (ANG)	010			Mohamed Elhadi El Kawisah (LBA)	100
				Jacob Gnahoui (BEN)	000
		Jacob Gnahoui (BEN)	100
		Houmed Moktar (DJI)	000

=== Repechage ===
Semifinals		Final
Yassine Moudatir (MAR)	100
Bernadin Tsala Tsala (CMR)	000	Yassine Moudatir (MAR)	000
		Mohamed Elhadi El Kawisah (LBA)	111

Semifinals		Final
Salim Rabahi (ALG)	100
Jacob Gnahoui (BEN)	000	Salim Rabahi (ALG)	010
		Nayr Garcia Pedro (ANG)	001

=== Women ===
Event	Gold	Silver	Bronze
48 kg	Taciana Lima (GBS)	Olfa Saoudi (TUN)	Asaramanitra Ratiarison (MAD); Sabrina Saidi (ALG)
52 kg	Hela Ayari (TUN)	Meriem Moussa (ALG)	Faiza Aissahine (ALG); Salimata Fofana (CIV)
57 kg	Ratiba Tariket (ALG)	Paule Sitcheping (CMR)	Zouleiha Abzetta Dabonne (CIV); Nesria Jelassi (TUN)
63 kg	Meriem Bjaoui (TUN)	Rizlen Zouak (MAR)	Imene Agouar (ALG); Szandra Szögedi (GHA)
70 kg	Assmaa Niang (MAR)	Houda Miled (TUN)	Antónia Moreira (ANG); Amina Belkadi (ALG)
78 kg	Hortence Vanessa Mballa Atangana (CMR)	Sarra Mzougui (TUN)	Kaouthar Ouallal (ALG); Sarah Myriam Mazouz (GAB)
+78 kg	Nihel Cheikh Rouhou (TUN)	Sonia Asselah (ALG)	Nadine Wetie Diodjo (CMR); Monica Sagna (SEN)
Open class	Hortence Vanessa Mballa Atangana (CMR)	Sonia Asselah (ALG)	Monica Sagna (SEN); Nihel Cheikh Rouhou (TUN)

=== Team ===
Event	Gold	Silver	Bronze
Men			
Women			

== Kata Events ==
Event	Gold	Silver	Bronze
Nage mo Kata			
Kime no Kata			
Katame-no-Kata			
