= Judo at the 2017 Islamic Solidarity Games =

Judo competition

Judo Judo at the 2017 Islamic Solidarity Games
- Venue: Heydar Aliyev Sports and Concert Complex
- Location: Baku, Azerbaijan
- Dates: 13–15 May 2017
- Competitors: 157 from 31 nations

Competition at external databases
- Links: IJF • JudoInside

Judo and Blind Judo at the 2017 Islamic Solidarity Games was held at the Heydar Aliyev Arena in Baku, Azerbaijan from 13 to 15 May 2017.

== Medal table ==
* Host nation (Azerbaijan)

| Rank | Nation | Gold | Silver | Bronze | Total |
|---|---|---|---|---|---|
| 1 | Azerbaijan* | 11 | 12 | 3 | 26 |
| 2 | Turkey | 4 | 4 | 6 | 14 |
| 3 | Uzbekistan | 3 | 1 | 6 | 10 |
| 4 | Algeria | 1 | 4 | 7 | 12 |
| 5 | Iran | 1 | 1 | 1 | 3 |
| 6 | Kyrgyzstan | 1 | 0 | 3 | 4 |
| 7 | Tunisia | 1 | 0 | 1 | 2 |
| 8 | Kazakhstan | 0 | 0 | 2 | 2 |
| 9 | Ivory Coast | 0 | 0 | 1 | 1 |
| 9 | Lebanon | 0 | 0 | 1 | 1 |
| 9 | Morocco | 0 | 0 | 1 | 1 |
| 9 | Turkmenistan | 0 | 0 | 1 | 1 |
| 9 | United Arab Emirates | 0 | 0 | 1 | 1 |
| Totals (13 entries) | | 22 | 22 | 34 | 78 |

== Medalists ==
=== Men ===
| Event | Gold | Silver | Bronze |
|---|---|---|---|
| Extra lightweight −60 kg | Orkhan Safarov; Azerbaijan | Bekir Özlü; Turkey | Diyorbek Urozboev; Uzbekistan |
| Extra lightweight −60 kg | Orkhan Safarov; Azerbaijan | Bekir Özlü; Turkey | Otar Bestaev; Kyrgyzstan |
| Half lightweight −66 kg | Nijat Shikhalizada; Azerbaijan | Houd Zourdani; Algeria | Sinan Sandal; Turkey |
| Half lightweight −66 kg | Nijat Shikhalizada; Azerbaijan | Houd Zourdani; Algeria | Alireza Khojasteh; Iran |
| Lightweight −73 kg | Hidayat Heydarov; Azerbaijan | Rustam Orujov; Azerbaijan | Bektur Rysmambetov; Kyrgyzstan |
| Lightweight −73 kg | Hidayat Heydarov; Azerbaijan | Rustam Orujov; Azerbaijan | Oussama Djeddi; Algeria |
| Half middleweight −81 kg | Saeid Mollaei; Iran | İlker Güldüren; Turkey | Davlat Bobonov; Uzbekistan |
| Half middleweight −81 kg | Saeid Mollaei; Iran | İlker Güldüren; Turkey | Vladimir Zoloev; Kyrgyzstan |
| Middleweight −90 kg | Mammadali Mehdiyev; Azerbaijan | Abderrahmane Benamadi; Algeria | Nacif Elias; Lebanon |
| Middleweight −90 kg | Mammadali Mehdiyev; Azerbaijan | Abderrahmane Benamadi; Algeria | Batuhan Efemgil; Turkey |
| Heavyweight −100 kg | Elkhan Mammadov; Azerbaijan | Elmar Gasimov; Azerbaijan | Ivan Remarenco; United Arab Emirates |
| Heavyweight −100 kg | Elkhan Mammadov; Azerbaijan | Elmar Gasimov; Azerbaijan | Lyès Bouyacoub; Algeria |
| Heavyweight +100 kg | Iurii Krakovetskii; Kyrgyzstan | Nadjib Temmar; Algeria | Bekmurod Oltiboev; Uzbekistan |
| Heavyweight +100 kg | Iurii Krakovetskii; Kyrgyzstan | Nadjib Temmar; Algeria | Yelaman Yergaliyev; Kazakhstan |
| Team | Azerbaijan; Rufat Ismayilov; Ushangi Kokauri; Elkhan Mammadov; Mammadali Mehdiyev; Rustam Orujov; Orkhan Safarov; Nijat Shikhalizada | Algeria; Abderrahmane Benamadi; Lyès Bouyacoub; Oussama Djeddi; Nadjib Temmar; Houd Zourdani | Uzbekistan; Giyosjon Boboev; Davlat Bobonov; Soyib Kurbonov; Bekmurod Oltiboev; Davronbek Sattorov; Diyorbek Urozboev |
| Team | Azerbaijan; Rufat Ismayilov; Ushangi Kokauri; Elkhan Mammadov; Mammadali Mehdiyev; Rustam Orujov; Orkhan Safarov; Nijat Shikhalizada | Algeria; Abderrahmane Benamadi; Lyès Bouyacoub; Oussama Djeddi; Nadjib Temmar; Houd Zourdani | Turkey; Batuhan Efemgil; Ali Erdoğan; İlker Güldüren; Bekir Özlü; Sinan Sandal; Hasan Vanlıoğlu; Feyyaz Yazıcı |

=== Women ===
| Event | Gold | Silver | Bronze |
|---|---|---|---|
| Extra lightweight −48 kg | Erdenebatyn Bazarragchaa; Azerbaijan | Aisha Gurbanli; Azerbaijan | Wafae Idrissi Chorfi; Morocco |
| Extra lightweight −48 kg | Erdenebatyn Bazarragchaa; Azerbaijan | Aisha Gurbanli; Azerbaijan | None awarded |
| Half lightweight −52 kg | İrem Korkmaz; Turkey | Nazakat Azizova; Azerbaijan | Guldana Almukhanbetova; Kazakhstan |
| Half lightweight −52 kg | İrem Korkmaz; Turkey | Nazakat Azizova; Azerbaijan | Meriem Moussa; Algeria |
| Lightweight −57 kg | Ratiba Tariket; Algeria | Kifayat Gasimova; Azerbaijan | Zouleiha Abzetta Dabonne; Ivory Coast |
| Lightweight −57 kg | Ratiba Tariket; Algeria | Kifayat Gasimova; Azerbaijan | Nazlıcan Özerler; Turkey |
| Half middleweight −63 kg | Büşra Katipoğlu; Turkey | Khanim Huseynova; Azerbaijan | Meriem Bjaoui; Tunisia |
| Half middleweight −63 kg | Büşra Katipoğlu; Turkey | Khanim Huseynova; Azerbaijan | Amina Belkadi; Algeria |
| Middleweight −70 kg | Gulnoza Matniyazova; Uzbekistan | Şükran Bakacak; Turkey | Mariýa Lohowa; Turkmenistan |
| Middleweight −70 kg | Gulnoza Matniyazova; Uzbekistan | Şükran Bakacak; Turkey | None awarded |
| Half heavyweight −78 kg | Sarra Mzougui; Tunisia | Çağrı Güzelsoy; Turkey | Kaouthar Ouallal; Algeria |
| Half heavyweight −78 kg | Sarra Mzougui; Tunisia | Çağrı Güzelsoy; Turkey | None awarded |
| Heavyweight +78 kg | Kayra Sayit; Turkey | Iryna Kindzerska; Azerbaijan | Sonia Asselah; Algeria |
| Heavyweight +78 kg | Kayra Sayit; Turkey | Iryna Kindzerska; Azerbaijan | None awarded |
| Team | Turkey; Şükran Bakacak; Çağrı Güzelsoy; Büşra Katipoğlu; İrem Korkmaz; Dilara Lokmanhekim; Nazlıcan Özerler; Kayra Sayit | Azerbaijan; Nazakat Azizova; Kifayat Gasimova; Khanim Huseynova; Gulsadaf Karimova; Iryna Kindzerska; Mönkhtsedeviin Ichinkhorloo; Pürevsürengiin Buyankhishig | Uzbekistan; Amangul Allanazarova; Mukhayyo Ibragimova; Diyora Keldiyorova; Gulnoza Matniyazova; Kumush Yuldashova |
| Team | Turkey; Şükran Bakacak; Çağrı Güzelsoy; Büşra Katipoğlu; İrem Korkmaz; Dilara Lokmanhekim; Nazlıcan Özerler; Kayra Sayit | Azerbaijan; Nazakat Azizova; Kifayat Gasimova; Khanim Huseynova; Gulsadaf Karimova; Iryna Kindzerska; Mönkhtsedeviin Ichinkhorloo; Pürevsürengiin Buyankhishig | None awarded |

=== Blind judo ===
| Event | Gold | Silver | Bronze |
|---|---|---|---|
| Men's half lightweight −66 kg | Elchin Talibov; Azerbaijan | Bayram Mustafayev; Azerbaijan | Recep Çiftçi; Turkey |
| Men's half lightweight −66 kg | Elchin Talibov; Azerbaijan | Bayram Mustafayev; Azerbaijan | None awarded |
| Men's lightweight −73 kg | Ramil Gasimov; Azerbaijan | Feruz Sayidov; Uzbekistan | Youcef Radjai; Algeria |
| Men's lightweight −73 kg | Ramil Gasimov; Azerbaijan | Feruz Sayidov; Uzbekistan | Natig Talibov; Azerbaijan |
| Men's middleweight −90 kg | Shukhrat Boboev; Uzbekistan | Mohammad Alishanani; Iran | Rovshan Safarov; Azerbaijan |
| Men's middleweight −90 kg | Shukhrat Boboev; Uzbekistan | Mohammad Alishanani; Iran | None awarded |
| Men's heavyweight +100 kg | Shirin Sharipov; Uzbekistan | Kanan Abdullakhanli; Azerbaijan | Ilham Zakiyev; Azerbaijan |
| Men's heavyweight +100 kg | Shirin Sharipov; Uzbekistan | Kanan Abdullakhanli; Azerbaijan | None awarded |
| Women's lightweight −57 kg | Afag Sultanova; Azerbaijan | Sevda Valiyeva; Azerbaijan | Zeynep Çelik; Turkey |
| Women's lightweight −57 kg | Afag Sultanova; Azerbaijan | Sevda Valiyeva; Azerbaijan | None awarded |
| Women's middleweight −70 kg | Ramila Kashtayeva; Azerbaijan | Turana Aghayeva; Azerbaijan | Gulruh Rahimova; Uzbekistan |
| Women's middleweight −70 kg | Ramila Kashtayeva; Azerbaijan | Turana Aghayeva; Azerbaijan | None awarded |
