= 2015 African Judo Championships =

Judo competition

The 2015 African Judo Championships were the 36th edition of the African Judo Championships, and were held in Libreville, Gabon from 23 to 26 April 2015.

== Medal overview ==
=== Men ===
Event	Gold	Silver	Bronze
60 kg	(Morocco) Yassine Moudatir	(Libya) Mohamed Elkawisah	(Morocco) Mohamed Jafy (Cameroon) Bernardin Tsala Tsala
66 kg	(Algeria) Houd Zourdani	(Tunisia) Houcem Khalfaoui	(Morocco) Imad Bassou (Libya) Ahmed Elkawisah
73 kg	(Egypt) Mohamed Mohyeldin	(Algeria) Oussama Djeddi	(Tunisia) Hamza Barhoumi (Egypt) Abdelrahman Mohamed
81 kg	(Tunisia) Abdelaziz Ben Ammar	(Egypt) Ali Hazem	(Egypt) Mohamed Abdelaal (Algeria) Larbi Grini
90 kg	(Algeria) Abderrahmane Benamadi	(South Africa) Zack Piontek	(Tunisia) Oussama Snoussi (Morocco) Imad Abdellaoui
100 kg	(Algeria) Lyes Bouyacoub	(Egypt) Ramadan Darwish	(South Africa) Calvin Fourie (Cameroon) Seidou Nji Mouluh
+100 kg	(Tunisia) Faicel Jaballah	(Egypt) Islam El Shehaby	(Algeria) Bilal Zouani (Morocco) Mehdi El Malki
Open class	(Tunisia) Faicel Jaballah	(Cameroon) Dieudonné Dolassem	(Egypt) Maisara Elnagar (Senegal) Baboukar Mane

=== Women ===
Event	Gold	Silver	Bronze
48 kg	(Guinea-Bissau) Taciana Lima	(Cameroon) Philomene Bata	(Tunisia) Olfa Saoudi (Madagascar) Asaramanitra Ratiarison
52 kg	(Tunisia) Hela Ayari	(Mauritius) Christianne Legentil	(Algeria) Djazia Haddad (Algeria) Meriem Moussa
57 kg	(Tunisia) Nesria Jlassi	(Algeria) Ratiba Tariket	(Cameroon) Paule Sitcheping (Senegal) Hortance Diedhiou
63 kg	(Morocco) Rizlen Zouak	(Algeria) Imene Agouar	(Cameroon) Hélène Wezeu Dombeu (Ghana) Szandra Szogedi
70 kg	(Tunisia) Houda Miled	(Morocco) Assmaa Niang	(Egypt) Nada Elfadly (Angola) Antónia Moreira
78 kg	(Algeria) Kaouther Ouallal	(Gabon) Sarah Myriam Mazouz	(Cameroon) Hortence Vanessa Mballa Atangana (Tunisia) Sarra Mzougui
+78 kg	(Tunisia) Nihel Cheikh Rouhou	(Cameroon) Nadine Wetie Diodjo	(Algeria) Sonia Asselah (Senegal) Monica Sagna
Open class	(Tunisia) Nihel Cheikh Rouhou	(Algeria) Sonia Asselah	(Senegal) Monica Sagna (Cameroon) Nadine Wetie Diodjo

=== Medals table ===
Rank	Nation	Gold	Silver	Bronze	Total
1	Tunisia	8	1	4	13
2	Algeria	4	4	5	13
3	Morocco	2	1	4	7
4	Egypt	1	3	4	8
5	Guinea-Bissau	1	0	0	1
6	Cameroon	0	3	6	9
7	Libya	0	1	1	2
7	South Africa	0	1	1	2
9	Gabon	0	1	0	1
9	Mauritius	0	1	0	1
11	Senegal	0	0	4	4
12	Angola	0	0	1	1
12	Ghana	0	0	1	1
12	Madagascar	0	0	1	1
Totals (14 entries)		16	16	32	64
