= 2018 African Judo Championships =

Judo competition

- Venue: El Menzah Sports Palace
- Location: Tunis, Tunisia
- Dates: 12–15 April 2018
- Competitors: 167 from 24 nations

The 2018 African Judo Championships were the 39th edition of the African Judo Championships, organised by the African Judo Union. The events took place in Tunis, Tunisia from 12–15 April 2018.

== Medal overview ==
=== Men ===
Event	Gold	Silver	Bronze
−60 kg	Issam Bassou (MAR)	Fraj Dhouibi (TUN)	Moussa Diop (SEN); Salim Rabahi (ALG)
−66 kg	Mohamed Abdelmawgoud (EGY)	Ahmed Abelrahman (EGY)	Imad Bassou (MAR); Houd Zourdani (ALG)
−73 kg	Fethi Nourine (ALG)	Mohamed Mohyeldin (EGY)	Acácio Quifucussa (ANG); Ahmed El Meziati (MAR)
−81 kg	Mohamed Abdelaal (EGY)	Achraf Moutii (MAR)	Abdelaziz Ben Ammar (TUN); Abdelrahman Mohamed (EGY)
−90 kg	Abderrahmane Benamadi (ALG)	Oussama Mahmoud Snoussi (TUN)	Eyale Le Beau (COD); Ali Hazem (EGY)
−100 kg	Ramadan Darwish (EGY)	Lyès Bouyacoub (ALG)	Bilal Belhimer (ALG); Anis Ben Khaled (TUN)
+100 kg	Faicel Jaballah (TUN)	Mbagnick Ndiaye (SEN)	Mustapha Abdallaoui (MAR); Mohamed-Amine Tayeb (ALG)
Open	Mohamed Sofiane Belrekaa (ALG)	Maisara Elnagar (EGY)	Dieudonne Dolassem (CMR); Faicel Jaballah (TUN)

=== Women ===
Event	Gold	Silver	Bronze
−48 kg	Olfa Saoudi (TUN)	Aziza Chakir (MAR)	Hadjer Mecerem (ALG); Geronay Whitebooi (RSA)
−52 kg	Fatima Zahra El Qorachi (MAR)	Hela Ayari (TUN)	Faiza Aissahine (ALG); Meriem Moussa (ALG)
−57 kg	Soumiya Iraoui (MAR)	Lamiaa Alzenan (EGY)	Nesria Jlassi (TUN); Ghofran Khelifi (TUN)
−63 kg	Meriem Bjaoui (TUN)	Sofia Belattar (MAR)	Imene Agouar (ALG); Amina Belkadi (ALG)
−70 kg	Assmaa Niang (MAR)	Souad Bellakehal (ALG)	Nihel Bouchoucha (TUN); Karene Agono Wora (GAB)
−78 kg	Kaouthar Ouallal (ALG)	Sarra Mzougui (TUN)	Unelle Snyman (RSA); Alaa Hamed (EGY)
+78 kg	Nihel Cheikh Rouhou (TUN)	Sonia Asselah (ALG)	Monica Sagna (SEN); Hortence Vanessa Mballa Atangana (CMR)
Open	Nihel Cheikh Rouhou (TUN)	Monica Sagna (SEN)	Hortence Vanessa Mballa Atangana (CMR); Unelle Snyman (RSA)

=== Medal table ===
Rank	Nation	Gold	Silver	Bronze	Total
1	Tunisia (TUN)	5	4	6	15
2	Algeria (ALG)	4	3	9	16
3	Morocco (MAR)	4	3	3	10
4	Egypt (EGY)	3	4	3	10
5	Senegal (SEN)	0	2	2	4
6	Cameroon (CMR)	0	0	3	3
6	South Africa (RSA)	0	0	3	3
8	Angola (ANG)	0	0	1	1
8	DR Congo (COD)	0	0	1	1
8	Gabon (GAB)	0	0	1	1
Totals (10 entries)		16	16	32	64

== Participating nations ==
There were a total of 182 participants from 25 nations.

- Algeria (20)
- Angola (6)
- Benin (2)
- Botswana (6)
- Burkina Faso (10)
- Cameroon (7)
- Cape Verde (5)
- Central African Republic (1)
- Democratic Republic of the Congo (9)
- Egypt (16)
- Gabon (5)
- Ghana (1)
- Guinea-Bissau (1)
- Ivory Coast (11)
- Libya (4)
- Madagascar (1)
- Mali (7)
- Mauritius (6)
- Morocco (17)
- Mozambique (6)
- Niger (1)
- Senegal (10)
- South Africa (8)
- Togo (4)
- Tunisia (18)
