= Monica Sagna =

Senegalese judoka (born 1991)

Personal information
- Born: 10 June 1991 (age 35)
- Occupation: Judoka

Sport
- Country: Senegal
- Sport: Judo
- Weight class: +78 kg, Open

Achievements and titles
- World Champ.: R32 (2015, 2018, 2019, 2022)
- African Champ.: (silver) (2018, 2022)
Medal record
Women's judo
Representing Senegal
African Games
Gold medal – first place	2023 Accra	+78 kg
Bronze medal – third place	2011 Maputo	+78 kg
Bronze medal – third place	2019 Rabat	+78 kg
African Championships
Silver medal – second place	2018 Tunis	Open
Silver medal – second place	2022 Oran	+78 kg
Bronze medal – third place	2010 Yaounde	+78 kg
Bronze medal – third place	2011 Dakar	Open
Bronze medal – third place	2012 Agadir	Open
Bronze medal – third place	2014 Port Louis	Open
Bronze medal – third place	2015 Libreville	+78 kg
Bronze medal – third place	2015 Libreville	Open
Bronze medal – third place	2016 Tunis	+78 kg
Bronze medal – third place	2016 Tunis	Open
Bronze medal – third place	2017 Antananarivo	Open
Bronze medal – third place	2017 Antananarivo	+78 kg
Bronze medal – third place	2018 Tunis	+78 kg
Bronze medal – third place	2020 Antananarivo	+78 kg
Bronze medal – third place	2021 Dakar	+78 kg
Bronze medal – third place	2023 Casablanca	+78 kg
Islamic Solidarity Games
Bronze medal – third place	2021 Konya	+78 kg
Jeux de la Francophonie
Bronze medal – third place	2013 Nice	+78 kg
African Junior Championships
Silver medal – second place	2010 Dakar	+78 kg

Profile at external databases
- IJF: 6910
- JudoInside.com: 70121
- Updated on 17 March 2024

Monica Sagna (born 10 June 1991) is a Senegalese judoka. She is a three-time medalist, including gold, at the African Games. She has also won numerous medals at the African Judo Championships.

== Career ==
She won one of the bronze medals in the women's +78 kg event at the 2019 African Games held in Rabat, Morocco.

In 2020, she won one of the bronze medals in the women's +78 kg event at the African Judo Championships held in Antananarivo, Madagascar.

At the 2021 African Judo Championships held in Dakar, Senegal, she also won one of the bronze medals in her event.

== Achievements ==
Year	Tournament	Place	Result	Event
Representing Senegal
2010	African Championships	Yaounde, Cameroon	3rd	Heavyweight (+78 kg)
2010	African Championships	Yaounde, Cameroon	7th	Open category
2011	African Championships	Dakar, Senegal	3rd	Open category
2011	All-Africa Games	Maputo, Mozambique	3rd	Heavyweight (+78 kg)
2012	African Championships	Agadir, Morocco	3rd	Open category
2013	African Championships	Maputo, Mozambique	5th	Heavyweight (+78 kg)
2013	Francophone Games	Nice, France	3rd	Heavyweight (+78 kg)
2014	African Championships	Port Louis, Mauritius	5th	Heavyweight (+78 kg)
2014	African Championships	Port Louis, Mauritius	3rd	Open category
2015	African Championships	Libreville, Gabon	3rd	Heavyweight (+78 kg)
2015	African Championships	Libreville, Gabon	3rd	Open category
2015	All-Africa Games	(Republic of the Congo) Brazzaville, Congo	5th	Heavyweight (+78 kg)
2016	African Championships	Tunis, Tunisia	3rd	Heavyweight (+78 kg)
2016	African Championships	Tunis, Tunisia	3rd	Open category
2017	African Championships	Antananarivo, Madagascar	3rd	Heavyweight (+78 kg)
2017	African Championships	Antananarivo, Madagascar	3rd	Open category
2018	African Championships	Tunis, Tunisia	3rd	Heavyweight (+78 kg)
2018	African Championships	Tunis, Tunisia	2nd	Open category
2019	African Games	Rabat, Morocco	3rd	Heavyweight (+78 kg)
2020	African Championships	Antananarivo, Madagascar	3rd	Heavyweight (+78 kg)
2021	African Championships	Dakar, Senegal	3rd	Heavyweight (+78 kg)
