= 2017 African Judo Championships =

Judo competition

- Location: Antananarivo, Madagascar
- Dates: 12–15 April 2017
- Competitors: 181 from 22 nations

The 2017 African Judo Championships was the 38th edition of the African Judo Championships, organised by the African Judo Union. It took place in Antananarivo, Madagascar from 12–15 April 2017.

== Medal overview ==
=== Men ===
Event	Gold	Silver	Bronze
−60 kg	Fraj Dhouibi (TUN)	Mohamed Rebahi (ALG)	Mohamed Jafy (MAR); Yassine Moudatir (MAR)
−66 kg	Houd Zourdani (ALG)	Wail Ezzine (ALG)	Ahmed Abelrahman (EGY); Siyabulela Mabulu (RSA)
−73 kg	Mohamed Mohyeldin (EGY)	Faye Njie (GAM)	Mahmoud Omar (EGY); Oussema Djeddi (ALG)
−81 kg	Mohamed Abdelaal (EGY)	Abdelaziz Ben Ammar (TUN)	Ali Hazem (EGY); Saliou Ndiaye (SEN)
−90 kg	Oussama Mahmoud Snoussi (TUN)	Dieudonne Dolassem (CMR)	Hatem Abd el Akher (EGY); Abdelrrahmane Benamadi (ALG)
−100 kg	Lyès Bouyacoub (ALG)	Ramadan Darwish (EGY)	Kreme Koffi Kobena (CIV); Boubakar Mane (SEN)
+100 kg	Nadjib Temmar (ALG)	Maisara Elnagar (EGY)	Mohamed El Mehdi Lili (ALG); Mbagnick Ndiaye (SEN)

=== Women ===
Event	Gold	Silver	Bronze
−48 kg	Taciana Cesar (GBS)	Olfa Saoudi (TUN)	Philomene Bata (CMR); Aziza Chakir (MAR)
−52 kg	Meriem Moussa (ALG)	Christiane Legentil (MUS)	Ikram Soukate (ALG); Meriem Moussa (ALG)
−57 kg	Ghofran Khelifi (TUN)	Ratiba Tariket (ALG)	Abzetta Zouleiha Dabonne (CIV); Diassonema Mucungui (ANG)
−63 kg	Sofia Belattar (MAR)	Meriem Bjaoui (TUN)	Hélène Wezeu Dombeu (CMR); Amina Belkadi (ALG)
−70 kg	Assmaa Niang (MAR)	Imene Agouar (ALG)	Nihel Bouchoucha (TUN); Souad Bellakehal (ALG)
−78 kg	Kaouthar Ouallal (ALG)	Sarra Mzougui (TUN)	Audrey dilane Njepang Njapa (CMR); Georgette Sagna (SEN)
+78 kg	Sonia Asselah (ALG)	Sahar Trabelsi (TUN)	Monica Sagna (SEN); Hortence Vanessa Mballa Atangana (CMR)

=== Medal table ===
Rank	Nation	Gold	Silver	Bronze	Total
1	Algeria (ALG)	6	4	6	16
2	Tunisia (TUN)	3	5	1	9
3	Egypt (EGY)	2	2	4	8
4	Morocco (MAR)	2	0	4	6
5	Guinea-Bissau (GBS)	1	0	0	1
6	Cameroon (CMR)	0	1	4	5
7	Gambia (GAM)	0	1	0	1
7	Mauritius (MUS)	0	1	0	1
9	Senegal (SEN)	0	0	5	5
10	Ivory Coast (CIV)	0	0	2	2
11	Angola (ANG)	0	0	1	1
11	South Africa (RSA)	0	0	1	1
Totals (12 entries)		14	14	28	56

== Participating nations ==
There were a total of 181 participants from 22 nations.

- Algeria (18)
- Angola (6)
- Burkina Faso (4)
- Burkina Faso (2)
- Cameroon (17)
- Democratic Republic of the Congo (2)
- Egypt (11)
- Gabon (2)
- Ghana (1)
- Guinea (1)
- Guinea-Bissau (2)
- Ivory Coast (5)
- Kenya (9)
- Madagascar (18)
- Mali (6)
- Mauritius (11)
- Morocco (13)
- Mozambique (2)
- Senegal (11)
- Seychelles (2)
- South Africa (11)
- Tunisia (10)
