= 2013 African Judo Championships =

Judo competition

2013 Judo African Judo Championships
- Venue: Maputo
- Location: Mozambique
- Date: 2013
- Competitors: 186 from 29 nations

Competition at external databases
- Links: IJF • JudoInside

The 2013 African Judo Championships were the 34th edition of the African Judo Championships, and were held in Maputo, Mozambique from 18 April to 19 April 2013.

== Medal overview ==
=== Men ===
Event	Gold	Silver	Bronze
60 kg	(Morocco) Yassine Moudatir	(Egypt) Mohamed Abdelmawgoud	(Tunisia) Fraj Dhouibi (Libya) Mohamed ElKawisah
66 kg	(Tunisia) Houcem Khalfaoui	(Algeria) Ahmed Mohammedi	(Egypt) Ahmed Awad (Algeria) Houd Zourdani
73 kg	(South Africa) Gideon van Zyl	(Tunisia) Hamza Barhoumi	(Algeria) Youcef Ouahab (Ghana) Emmanuel Nartey
81 kg	(Morocco) Safouane Attaf	(Tunisia) Abdelaziz Ben Ammar	(Egypt) Mohamed Abdelaal (Algeria) Yacine Ladour
90 kg	(Egypt) Hatem Abd el Akher	(Egypt) Mohamed Darwish	(Algeria) Amar Benikhlef (Ivory Coast) Kinapeya Kone
100 kg	(Egypt) Ramadan Darwish	(Algeria) Lyes Bouyacoub	(Tunisia) Anis Ben Khaled (Senegal) Amdy Fall
+100 kg	(Tunisia) Faicel Jaballah	(Algeria) Mohamed Tayeb	(Egypt) Islam El Shehaby (Morocco) Mehdi El Malki
Open class	(Egypt) Islam El Shehaby	(Tunisia) Faicel Jaballah	(Cameroon) Dieudonné Dolassem (Algeria) Bilal Zouani

=== Women ===
Event	Gold	Silver	Bronze
48 kg	(Guinea-Bissau) Taciana Lima	(Algeria) Sabrina Saidi	(Tunisia) Hela Ayari (Madagascar) Asaramanitra Ratiarison
52 kg	(Tunisia) Amani Khalfaoui	(Algeria) Djazia Haddad	(Mauritius) Christianne Legentil (Senegal) Mariama Ndou
57 kg	(Tunisia) Nesria Jlassi	(Morocco) Fatima Zohra Ait Ali	(Tunisia) Ons Ben Messaoud (Senegal) Hortense Diedhiou
63 kg	(Morocco) Rizlen Zouak	(Algeria) Imene Agouar	(Tunisia) Asma Bjaoui (Cameroon) Hélène Wezeu Dombeu
70 kg	(Morocco) Assmaa Niang	(Angola) Antónia Moreira	(Egypt) Hend Abdelmeguid (Tunisia) Houda Miled
78 kg	(Tunisia) Hana Mareghni	(Gabon) Audrey Koumba	(Cameroon) Hortence Vanessa Mballa Atangana (Algeria) Kaouther Ouallal
+78 kg	(Tunisia) Nihel Cheikh Rouhou	(Tunisia) Sahar Trabelsi	(Algeria) Sonia Asselah (Cameroon) Dechantal Fokou Ntolack
Open class	(Tunisia) Nihel Cheikh Rouhou	(Kenya) Esther Ratugi	(Cameroon) Dechantal Fokou Ntolack (Algeria) Kaouther Ouallal

=== Medals table ===
Rank	Nation	Gold	Silver	Bronze	Total
1	Tunisia	7	4	5	16
2	Morocco	4	1	1	6
3	Egypt	3	2	2	7
4	Guinea-Bissau	1	0	0	1
4	South Africa	1	0	0	1
6	Algeria	0	6	6	12
7	Angola	0	1	0	1
7	Gabon	0	1	0	1
7	Kenya	0	1	0	1
10	Cameroon	0	0	5	5
11	Senegal	0	0	3	3
12	Ghana	0	0	1	1
12	Ivory Coast	0	0	1	1
12	Libya	0	0	1	1
12	Madagascar	0	0	1	1
12	Mauritius	0	0	1	1
Totals (16 entries)		16	16	27	59
