= Szandra Szögedi =

Hungarian–Ghanaian judoka (born 1988)

Personal information
- Nationality: Hungarian-Ghanaian
- Born: Szandra Szögedi; 19 October 1988 (age 37) Budapest, Hungary
- Occupation: Judoka
- Height: 1.58 m (5 ft 2 in)
- Weight: 63 kg (139 lb)

Sport
- Country: Hungary (2006-09); Ghana (2011-16)
- Sport: Judo
- Event: -63 kg
- Club: Camberley Judo Club
Medal record
Women's Judo
Representing Ghana
African Games
Bronze medal – third place	2015 Brazzaville	-63 kg
African Judo Championships
Bronze medal – third place	2012 Agadir	57 kg
Bronze medal – third place	2014 Port-Louis	63 kg
Bronze medal – third place	2015 Libreville	63 kg
Bronze medal – third place	2016 Tunis	63 kg
African Open
Gold medal – first place	2014 Port-Louis	-63 kg

Profile at external databases
- IJF: 7063
- JudoInside.com: 24300

Szandra Szögedi (born 19 October 1988) is a Hungarian-born naturalized Ghanaian judoka who currently competes in the -63 kg event. Born and raised in Hungary, she is married to Ghanaian judoka Alex Amoako and competes for Ghana in international competitions. She competed in the Women's -63 kg at the 2014 Commonwealth Games.

Szögedi represented Ghana in the Women's -63 kg at the 2016 Summer Olympics in Rio de Janeiro, Brazil. She was the first female judoka to represent Ghana at an Olympic competition.

== Competition record ==
Year	Competition	Venue	Position	Event	Notes
Representing Ghana
2014	Commonwealth Games	Glasgow, Scotland		-63 kg	Did not advance from preliminary round of 16
2015	African Games	Brazzaville, Republic of the Congo	3rd	-63 kg	
2016	Olympic Games	Rio de Janeiro, Brazil		-63 kg	Did not advance from first round
