= 2014 African Judo Championships =

Judo competition

The 2014 African Judo Championships were the 35th edition of the African Judo Championships, and were held in Port-Louis, Mauritius from 26 to 29 June 2014.

== Medal overview ==
=== Men ===
Event	Gold	Silver	Bronze
60 kg	(Tunisia) Fraj Dhouibi	(Morocco) Ayoub Idrissi	(Morocco) Yassine Moudatir (Algeria) Mohamed Rebahi
66 kg	(Egypt) Mohamed Abdelmawgoud	(Tunisia) Houcem Khalfaoui	(Algeria) Fethi Nourine (Algeria) Houd Zourdani
73 kg	(South Africa) Gideon van Zyl	(Algeria) Oussama Djeddi	(Egypt) Mohamed Mohyeldin (Morocco) Hatim Tagrourti
81 kg	(Morocco) Safouane Attaf	(Egypt) Ali Hazem	(Tunisia) Abdelaziz Ben Ammar (Algeria) Yacine Ladour
90 kg	(Egypt) Hatem Abd el Akher	(Algeria) Abderrahmane Benamadi	(Tunisia) Ahmed Lahmadi (Morocco) Imad Abdellaoui
100 kg	(Algeria) Lyes Bouyacoub	(Egypt) Ramadan Darwish	(Cameroon) Stéphane Ombiongno (Senegal) Mbagnick Ndiaye
+100 kg	(Tunisia) Faicel Jaballah	(Egypt) Islam El Shehaby	(Algeria) Bilal Zouani (Morocco) Mehdi El Malki
Open class	(Tunisia) Faicel Jaballah	(Algeria) Mohammed Tayeb	(Cameroon) Dieudonné Dolassem (Morocco) Mehdi El Malki

=== Women ===
Event	Gold	Silver	Bronze
48 kg	(Guinea-Bissau) Taciana Lima	(Algeria) Sabrina Saidi	(Mauritius) Priscilla Morand (Madagascar) Asaramanitra Ratiarison
52 kg	(Tunisia) Hela Ayari	(Mauritius) Christianne Legentil	(Egypt) Aya Khaled (Algeria) Meriem Moussa
57 kg	(Algeria) Ratiba Tariket	(Tunisia) Nesria Jlassi	(Cameroon) Paule Sitcheping (Morocco) Fatima Chakir
63 kg	(Algeria) Imene Agouar	(Algeria) Souad Belakhal	(Morocco) Rizlen Zouak (Ghana) Szandra Szogedi
70 kg	(Angola) Antónia Moreira	(Cameroon) Fabiola Ndanga Nana	(Morocco) Assmaa Niang (Egypt) Nada Ibrahim
78 kg	(Algeria) Kaouther Ouallal	(Gabon) Sarah Myriam Mazouz	(Cameroon) Hortence Vanessa Mballa Atangana (Tunisia) Sarra Mzougui
+78 kg	(Tunisia) Nihel Cheikh Rouhou	(Algeria) Sonia Asselah	(Tunisia) Sahar Trabelsi (Cameroon) Christelle Okodombe
Open class	(Algeria) Sonia Asselah	(Tunisia) Nihel Cheikh Rouhou	(Senegal) Monica Sagna (Cameroon) Nadine Wetie Diodjo

=== Medals table ===
Rank	Nation	Gold	Silver	Bronze	Total
1	Algeria	5	6	6	17
2	Tunisia	5	3	4	12
3	Egypt	2	3	3	8
4	Morocco	1	1	8	10
5	Angola	1	0	0	1
5	Guinea-Bissau	1	0	0	1
5	South Africa	1	0	0	1
8	Cameroon	0	1	6	7
9	Mauritius	0	1	1	2
10	Gabon	0	1	0	1
11	Senegal	0	0	2	2
12	Ghana	0	0	1	1
12	Madagascar	0	0	1	1
Totals (13 entries)		16	16	32	64
