= Judo at the 2015 African Games =

Judo competition

Judo Judo at the 2015 African Games
- Venue: Brazzaville
- Location: Republic of the Congo; Brazzaville
- Dates: 13-15 September
- Competitors: 223 from 36 nations

Competition at external databases
- Links: IJF • JudoInside

The judo tournament at the 2015 African Games in Brazzaville was held between September 13–15, 2015. There were 223 judoka from 36 nations participating.

== Participating nations ==
- Algeria (18)
- Angola (2)
- Botswana (3)
- Burkina Faso (2)
- Burundi (5)
- Cameroon (8)
- Central African Republic (3)
- Chad (7)
- Republic of the Congo (18)
- Democratic Republic of the Congo (9)
- Djibouti (2)
- Egypt (9)
- Equatorial Guinea (2)
- Gabon (17)
- The Gambia (1)
- Ghana (8)
- Guinea (3)
- Guinea-Bissau (1)
- Ivory Coast (10)
- Kenya (8)
- Libya (5)
- Madagascar (2)
- Mali (6)
- Mauritania (4)
- Mozambique (5)
- Niger (14)
- Senegal (9)
- Seychelles (1)
- South Africa (3)
- Sudan (2)
- Swaziland (2)
- Tanzania (2)
- Togo (1)
- Tunisia (18)
- Zambia (11)
- Zimbabwe (2)

== Results ==
=== Women's 48 kg ===
- (gold) Sabrina Saidi (ALG)
- (silver) Olfa Saoudi (TUN)
- (bronze) Taciana Lima (GBS)
- (bronze) Fatima Bashir (NGA)

=== Women's 52 kg ===
- (gold) Djazia Haddad (ALG)
- (silver) Hela Ayari (TUN)
- (bronze) Franca Audu (NGA)
- (bronze) Salimata Fofana (CIV)

=== Women's 57 kg ===
- (gold) Ratiba Tariket (ALG)
- (silver) Zouleiha Abzetta Dabonne (CIV)
- (bronze) Léa Buet (SEN)
- (bronze) Hortance Diedhiou (SEN)

=== Women's 63 kg ===
- (gold) Hélène Wezeu Dombeu (CMR)
- (silver) Souad Belakhal (ALG)
- (bronze) Szandra Szögedi (GHA)
- (bronze) Meriem Bjaoui (TUN)

=== Women's 70 kg ===
- (gold) Antónia Moreira (ANG)
- (silver) Houda Miled (TUN)
- (bronze) Aicha Ben Abderahmane (ALG)
- (bronze) Nihel Bouchoucha (TUN)

=== Women's 78 kg ===
- (gold) Kaouthar Ouallal (ALG)
- (silver) Sarra Mzougui (TUN)
- (bronze) Rita Ebere (NGR)
- (bronze) Hortence Vanessa Mballa Atangana (CMR)

=== Women's +78 kg ===
- (gold) Nihel Cheikh Rouhou (TUN)
- (silver) Sonia Asselah (ALG)
- (bronze) Sahar Trabelsi (TUN)
- (bronze) Nadine Wetie Diodjo (CMR)

=== Men's 60 kg ===
- (gold) Ahmed Abelrahman (EGY)
- (silver) Kamel Haroune (ALG)
- (bronze) Fraj Dhouibi (TUN)
- (bronze) Nayr Garcia Pedro (ANG)

=== Men's 66 kg ===
- (gold) Houd Zourdani (ALG)
- (silver) Ali Abdelmouaty (EGY)
- (bronze) Harnold Koussou Ouvelou (GAB)
- (bronze) Mohamed Abdelmawgoud (EGY)

=== Men's 73 kg ===
- (gold) Mohamed Mohyeldin (EGY)
- (silver) Faye Njie (GAM)
- (bronze) Emmanuel Nartey (GHA)
- (bronze) Edson Madeira (MOZ)

=== Men's 81 kg ===
- (gold) Mohamed Abdelaal (EGY)
- (silver) Paul Kibikal (GAB)
- (bronze) Abdelaziz Ben Ammar (TUN)
- (bronze) Ali Hazem (EGY)

=== Men's 90 kg ===
- (gold) Abderrahmane Benamadi (ALG)
- (silver) Oussama Mahmoud snoussi (TUN)
- (bronze) Dieudonne Dolassem (CMR)
- (bronze) Zack piontek (RSA)

=== Men's 100 kg ===
- (gold) Lyes Bouyacoub (ALG)
- (silver) Anis Ben Khaled (TUN)
- (bronze) Baboukar Mane (SEN)
- (bronze) Seidou Nji Mouluh (CMR)

=== Men's +100 kg ===
- (gold) Faicel Jaballah (TUN)
- (silver) Bilal Zouani (ALG)
- (bronze) Deo Gracia Ngokaba (CGO)
- (bronze) Khaled Selim (EGY)

== Medal table ==
Rank	Nation	Gold	Silver	Bronze	Total
1	Algeria (ALG)	7	4	1	12
2	Egypt (EGY)	3	1	3	7
3	Tunisia (TUN)	2	6	5	13
4	Cameroon (CMR)	1	0	4	5
5	Angola (ANG)	1	0	1	2
6	Gabon (GAB)	0	1	1	2
6	Ivory Coast (CIV)	0	1	1	2
8	The Gambia (GAM)	0	1	0	1
9	Nigeria (NGR)	0	0	3	3
9	Senegal (SEN)	0	0	3	3
11	Ghana (GHA)	0	0	2	2
12	Guinea-Bissau (GBS)	0	0	1	1
12	Mozambique (MOZ)	0	0	1	1
12	Republic of the Congo (CGO)	0	0	1	1
12	South Africa (RSA)	0	0	1	1
Totals (15 entries)		14	14	28	56
