= 2010 African Judo Championships =

Judo competition

2010 Judo African Judo Championships
- Venue: Yaoundé
- Location: Cameroon
- Date: 2010
- Competitors: 198 from 24 nations

Competition at external databases
- Links: IJF • JudoInside

The 2010 African Judo Championships were the 31st edition of the African Judo Championships, and were held in Yaounde, Cameroon from 15 April to 18 April 2010.

== Medal overview ==
=== Men ===
Event	Gold	Silver	Bronze
60 kg	(Morocco) Yassine Moudatir	(Egypt) Mohamed Monier	(Democratic Republic of the Congo) Cael Lokoko Mboyo (Nigeria) Eniafe Solomon
66 kg	(Algeria) Youcef Nouari	(Egypt) Amin El Hady	(Tunisia) Ragheb Karchoud (Morocco) Rachid El Kadiri
73 kg	(Morocco) Anass Farih	(Tunisia) Seifeddine Ben Hassen	(South Africa) Gideon van Zyl (Egypt) Hussein Hafiz
81 kg	(Morocco) Safouane Attaf	(Egypt) Hatem Abd el Akher	(Tunisia) Mohamed Fadhel Gazouani (Angola) Angelo António
90 kg	(Algeria) Amar Benikhlef	(Cameroon) Dieudonne Dolassem	(South Africa) Patrick Trezise (Ivory Coast) Kinapeya Kone
100 kg	(Egypt) Ramadan Darwish	(Cameroon) Franck Moussima	(Algeria) Hassene Azzoune (Libya) Mohamed Ben Saleh
+100 kg	(Egypt) Islam El Shehaby	(Tunisia) Anis Chedly	(Morocco) El Mehdi Malki (Algeria) Ahmed Kebaili
Open class	(Tunisia) Anis Chedly	(Egypt) Islam El Shehaby	(Cameroon) Dieudonne Dolassem (Algeria) Lyes Bouyacoub

=== Women ===
Event	Gold	Silver	Bronze
48 kg	(Tunisia) Amani Khalfaoui	(Cameroon) Philomene Bata	(Nigeria) Franca Audu (Egypt) Mahitab Farouk
52 kg	(Morocco) Hanane Kerroumi	(Cameroon) Ngandeu Weyinjam	(Algeria) Meriem Moussa (Ivory Coast) Zouleiha Abzetta Dabonne
57 kg	(Tunisia) Nesrine Jlassi	(Morocco) Fatima Zohra Chakir	(Senegal) Hortense Diedhiou (Egypt) Amal Fawzi
63 kg	(Algeria) Kahina Saidi	(Tunisia) Asma Bjaoui	(Burkina Faso) Séverine Nébié (Morocco) Aida Ali Oualla
70 kg	(Tunisia) Houda Miled	(Algeria) Kahina Hadid	(Angola) Antonia Moreira (Cameroon) Felicité Mbala
78 kg	(Algeria) Kaouther Ouallal	(Tunisia) Hana Mareghni	(Gabon) Audrey Koumba (Senegal) Sagna Georgette
+78 kg	(Tunisia) Nihel Cheikh Rouhou	(Morocco) Rania El Kilali	(Algeria) Sonia Asselah (Senegal) Monica Sagna
Open class	(Tunisia) Nihel Cheikh Rouhou	(Morocco) Rania El Kilali	(Algeria) Sonia Asselah (Nigeria) Adijat Ayuba

=== Medals table ===
Rank	Nation	Gold	Silver	Bronze	Total
1	Tunisia	6	4	2	12
2	Morocco	4	3	3	10
3	Algeria	4	1	6	11
4	Egypt	2	4	3	9
5	Cameroon	0	4	2	6
6	Nigeria	0	0	3	3
6	Senegal	0	0	3	3
8	Angola	0	0	2	2
8	Ivory Coast	0	0	2	2
8	South Africa	0	0	2	2
11	Burkina Faso	0	0	1	1
11	DR Congo	0	0	1	1
11	Gabon	0	0	1	1
11	Libya	0	0	1	1
Totals (14 entries)		16	16	32	64
