= 2021 African Judo Championships – Women's 78 kg =

Judo competition

Judo Women's 78 kg at the 2021 African Judo Championships
- Venue: Dakar Arena
- Location: Dakar, Senegal
- Date: 22 May 2021
- Competitors: 8 from 8 nations

Medalists
gold medal	Marie Branser	DR Congo
silver medal	Hafsa Yatim	Morocco
bronze medal	Sarra Mzougui	Tunisia
bronze medal	Kaouthar Ouallal	Algeria

Competition at external databases
- Links: IJF • JudoInside

The women's 78 kg competition in at the 2021 African Judo Championships was held on 22 May at the Dakar Arena in Dakar, Senegal.

== Results ==
=== Main Round ===
Quarterfinals
Kaouthar Ouallal (ALG)	10
Fatim Fofana (CIV)	00
Hafsa Yatim (MAR)	10
Joyce Bichbich (KEN)	00
Marie Branser (COD)	10
Joy Asonye (NGR)	00
Sarra Mzougui (TUN)	10
Yacine Diatta (SEN)	00

Semifinals
Kaouthar Ouallal (ALG)	00
Hafsa Yatim (MAR)	10
Marie Branser (COD)	10
Sarra Mzougui (TUN)	00

Final
Hafsa Yatim (MAR)	00
Marie Branser (COD)	10

=== Repechage ===
Repechage		Bronze medal
Fatim Fofana (CIV)	10
Joyce Bichbich (KEN)	00	Fatim Fofana (CIV)	00
		Sarra Mzougui (TUN)	10

Repechage		Bronze medal
Joy Asonye (NGR)	10
Yacine Diatta (SEN)	00	Joy Asonye (NGR)	00
		Kaouthar Ouallal (ALG)	10
