= Fethi Nourine =

Algerian judoka (born 1991)

Personal information
- Nationality: Algerian
- Born: 14 June 1991 (age 35) Oran, Algeria
- Occupation: Judoka
- Height: 172 cm (5 ft 8 in)

Sport
- Country: Algeria
- Sport: Judo
- Weight class: –73 kg

Achievements and titles
- African Champ.: (gold) (2018, 2019, 2021)
Medal record
Representing Algeria
Men's judo
African Championships
Gold medal – first place	Tunis 2018	–73 kg
Gold medal – first place	Cape Town 2019	–73 kg
Gold medal – first place	Dakar 2021	–73 kg
Bronze medal – third place	Port-Louis 2014	–66 kg
Bronze medal – third place	Tunis 2016	–73 kg
Bronze medal – third place	Antananarivo 2020	–73 kg

Profile at external databases
- IJF: 3911
- JudoInside.com: 70099
- Updated on 31 October 2021

Fethi Nourine (Arabic: فتحي نورين; born 14 June 1991) is an Algerian judoka, who has competed in the under 73 kg weight category, and won three African Judo Championships. Nourine has been suspended by the International Judo Federation until July 2031 for avoiding the prospect of possibly facing an Israeli judoka in the 2020 Summer Olympics.

== Career ==
Raised in Oran, Algeria, he started judo aged seven after being introduced to the discipline by his brother. In 2014, he won the under 66 kg event at the African Open, beating fellow Algerian Houd Zourdani in the final. It was Algeria's first gold medal of the tournament. He became African champion in the under 73 kg event after winning the event at the 2018 African Judo Championships. He retained his title the following year in Tunisia. That same year he participated in the World Championships in Japan. He won his first match but then pulled out of the tournament as he refused to face his next scheduled opponent, the Israeli competitor Tohar Butbul for what he said were political reasons. In 2021, Nourine won the under 73 kg event at the African Judo Championships.

Selected to compete at the delayed 2020 Summer Olympics in the -73 kg weight class, Nourine and his coach Amar Benikhlef announced his withdrawal following the conclusion of the draw of competitors. Nourine was quoted as saying his political support for the Palestinian cause made it impossible for him to compete against an Israeli like Tohar Butbul, the # 5 seed in the tournament, who he was drawn to potentially face in the second round, had he won in the first round. The International Judo Federation announced his and his coach's immediate suspensions on 24 July 2021, pending a further investigation, and sent Nourine and his coach back home to Algeria from Tokyo. In September 2021, Nourine and Benikhlef were both suspended for ten years, until July 2031.
