= 2019 African Judo Championships =

Judo competition

- Location: Cape Town, South Africa
- Dates: 25–28 April 2019
- Competitors: 179 from 28 nations

The 2019 African Judo Championships was the 40th edition of the African Judo Championships, organised by the African Judo Union. It took place in Cape Town, South Africa from 25–28 April 2019.

== Medal overview ==
=== Men ===
Event	Gold	Silver	Bronze
−60 kg	Fraj Dhouibi (TUN)	Bernadin Tsala Tsala (CMR)	Younes Saddiki (MAR); Salim Rabahi (ALG)
−66 kg	Mohamed Abdelmawgoud (EGY)	Imad Bassou (MAR)	Diogo César (GBS); Ahmed Abdelrahman (EGY)
−73 kg	Fethi Nourine (ALG)	Mohamed Mohyeldin (EGY)	Aden-Alexandre Houssein (DJI); Faye Njie (GAM)
−81 kg	Mohamed Abdelaal (EGY)	Abdelaziz Ben Ammar (TUN)	Abdelrahman Mohamed (EGY); Achraf Moutii (MAR)
−90 kg	Hatem Abd el Akher (EGY)	Abderrahmane Benamadi (ALG)	Abderahmane Diao (SEN); Oussama Mahmoud Snoussi (TUN)
−100 kg	Lyès Bouyacoub (ALG)	Ramadan Darwish (EGY)	Dominic Dugasse (SEY); Seidou Nji Mouluh (CMR)
+100 kg	Mbagnick Ndiaye (SEN)	Mohamed Sofiane Belrekaa (ALG)	Mustapha Abdallaoui (MAR); Mohamed-Amine Tayeb (ALG)

=== Women ===
Event	Gold	Silver	Bronze
−48 kg	Geronay Whitebooi (RSA)	Hadjer Mecerem (ALG)	Oumaima Bedioui (TUN); Priscilla Morand (MRI)
−52 kg	Taciana Cesar (GBS)	Soumiya Iraoui (MAR)	Salimata Fofana (CIV); Meriem Moussa (ALG)
−57 kg	Ghofran Khelifi (TUN)	Lamiaa Alzenan (EGY)	Diassonema Mucungui (ANG); Yamina Halata (ALG)
−63 kg	Amina Belkadi (ALG)	Sofia Belattar (MAR)	Jasmine Martin (RSA); Hélène Wezeu Dombeu (CMR)
−70 kg	Nihel Landolsi (TUN)	Souad Bellakehal (ALG)	Ayuk Otay Arrey Sophina (CMR); Demos Memneloum (CHA)
−78 kg	Kaouthar Ouallal (ALG)	Unelle Snyman (RSA)	Sarah Myriam Mazouz (GAB); Sarra Mzougui (TUN)
+78 kg	Nihel Cheikh Rouhou (TUN)	Hortence Vanessa Mballa Atangana (CMR)	Sonia Asselah (ALG); Kariman Shafik (EGY)

=== Medal table ===
Rank	Nation	Gold	Silver	Bronze	Total
1	Algeria (ALG)	4	4	5	13
2	Tunisia (TUN)	4	1	3	8
3	Egypt (EGY)	3	3	4	10
4	South Africa (RSA)	1	1	1	3
5	Guinea-Bissau (GBS)	1	0	1	2
5	Senegal (SEN)	1	0	1	2
7	Morocco (MAR)	0	3	2	5
8	Cameroon (CMR)	0	2	3	5
9	Angola (ANG)	0	0	1	1
9	Chad (CHA)	0	0	1	1
9	Djibouti (DJI)	0	0	1	1
9	Gabon (GAB)	0	0	1	1
9	Gambia (GAM)	0	0	1	1
9	Ivory Coast (CIV)	0	0	1	1
9	Mauritius (MRI)	0	0	1	1
9	Seychelles (SEY)	0	0	1	1
Totals (16 entries)		14	14	28	56

== Participating nations ==
There were a total of 179 participants from 28 nations.

- Algeria (17)
- Angola (4)
- Benin (2)
- Botswana (7)
- Burkina Faso (3)
- Cameroon (15)
- Cape Verde (3)
- Chad (4)
- Djibouti (2)
- Democratic Republic of the Congo (6)
- Egypt (14)
- Gabon (4)
- Gambia (1)
- Ghana (2)
- Guinea-Bissau (2)
- Ivory Coast (8)
- Malawi (4)
- Mali (7)
- Mauritius (17)
- Morocco (15)
- Mozambique (7)
- Senegal (2)
- Seychelles (5)
- South Africa (16)
- Togo (2)
- Tunisia (10)
- Zambia (2)
- Zimbabwe (1)
