= Faïcel Jaballah =

Tunisian judoka (born 1988)

Faicel Jaballah
Personal information
- Native name: فيصل جاب الله
- Nationality: Tunisia
- Born: 1 May 1988 (age 38) Nefta, Tunisia
- Home town: Tozeur, Tunisia
- Occupation: Judoka
- Height: 196 cm (6 ft 5 in)
- Weight: 140 kg (309 lb)

Sport
- Country: Tunisia
- Sport: Judo
- Weight class: +100 kg
- Coached by: Anis Lounifi

Achievements and titles
- Olympic Games: R16 (2012)
- World Champ.: (bronze) (2013)
- African Champ.: (gold) (2012, 2013, 2014, 2014, 2015, 2015, 2016, 2016, 2018, 2021)
Medal record
Men's judo
Representing Tunisia
World Championships
Bronze medal – third place	2013 Rio de Janeiro	+100 kg
African Games
Gold medal – first place	2011 Maputo	+100 kg
Gold medal – first place	2015 Brazzaville	+100 kg
Bronze medal – third place	2019 Rabat	+100 kg
African Championships
Gold medal – first place	2012 Agadir	Open
Gold medal – first place	2013 Maputo	+100 kg
Gold medal – first place	2014 Port Louis	+100 kg
Gold medal – first place	2014 Port Louis	Open
Gold medal – first place	2015 Libreville	+100 kg
Gold medal – first place	2015 Libreville	Open
Gold medal – first place	2016 Tunis	+100 kg
Gold medal – first place	2016 Tunis	Open
Gold medal – first place	2018 Tunis	+100 kg
Gold medal – first place	2021 Dakar	+100 kg
Silver medal – second place	2011 Dakar	+100 kg
Silver medal – second place	2011 Dakar	Open
Silver medal – second place	2013 Maputo	Open
Bronze medal – third place	2009 Mauritius	Open
Bronze medal – third place	2012 Agadir	+100 kg
Bronze medal – third place	2018 Tunis	Open
IJF Grand Slam
Gold medal – first place	2014 Baku	+100 kg
Bronze medal – third place	2013 Moscow	+100 kg
Bronze medal – third place	2014 Paris	+100 kg
Bronze medal – third place	2015 Abu Dhabi	+100 kg
IJF Grand Prix
Gold medal – first place	2015 Samsun	+100 kg
Silver medal – second place	2013 Samsun	+100 kg
Silver medal – second place	2014 Düsseldorf	+100 kg
Bronze medal – third place	2015 Budapest	+100 kg
African Junior Championships
Gold medal – first place	2006 South Africa	+100 kg
Mediterranean Games
Bronze medal – third place	2013 Mersin	+100 kg
Bronze medal – third place	2018 Tarragona	+100 kg
Pan Arab Games
Gold medal – first place	2011 Doha	Open
Silver medal – second place	2011 Doha	+100 kg

Profile at external databases
- IJF: 2505
- JudoInside.com: 32267
- Updated on 5 July 2023

Faicel (or Faycal) Jaballah (Arabic: فيصل جاب الله) (born 1 May 1988 in Nefta, Tunisia) is a Tunisian judoka. He is 1,96 m tall and weighs 130 kg.

== Achievements ==
At the 2011 All-Africa Games in Maputo, Faicel won a gold medal in +100 kg category.

Faicel competed at the 2012 Summer Olympics in the +100 kg event, he defeated Yerzhan Shynkeyev before being eliminated by the 2011 world champion Teddy Riner.

Faicel qualified for the 2013 World Judo Championships in Rio. He competed in the +100kg division, and defeated Roy Meyer and Islam El Shehaby before being defeated by Andreas Tölzer in the final match of the pool B. In the repechage, Faicel defeated Ryu Shichinohe and advanced to face Adam Okruashvili for the third place in +100 kg category. He finished the competition in the third place, along with Andreas Tölzer. This result was the best achievement in his career so far.

At the 2016 Olympics, he lost his first match to Barna Bor.

At the 2021 African Judo Championships held in Dakar, Senegal, he won the gold medal in his event.
