= Judo at the 2013 Jeux de la Francophonie =

Judo competition

Judo Judo at the 2013 Jeux de la Francophonie
- Location: Nice, France
- Dates: 11–13 September 2013

Competition at external databases
- Links: JudoInside

At the 2013 Jeux de la Francophonie, the judo events were held in Nice, France from 11 to 13 September. A total of 14 events were contested according to gender and weight division.

== Medal winners ==
=== Men ===
Event	Gold	Silver	Bronze
Extra-lightweight (60 kg)	Sérgio Pessoa (CAN)	Kamel Mohamedi (FRA)	Valentin Rota (SUI)
Extra-lightweight (60 kg)	Sérgio Pessoa (CAN)	Kamel Mohamedi (FRA)	Grigor Ivanyan (ARM)
Half-lightweight (66 kg)	Vincent Vallee (FRA)	Patrick Gagné (CAN)	Tigran Varosyan (ARM)
Half-lightweight (66 kg)	Vincent Vallee (FRA)	Patrick Gagné (CAN)	Grzegorz Lewiński (POL)
Lightweight (73 kg)	Jonathan Allardon (FRA)	Étienne Briand (QBC)	Hamza Barhoumi (TUN)
Lightweight (73 kg)	Jonathan Allardon (FRA)	Étienne Briand (QBC)	Alexis Morin-Martel (CAN)
Half-middleweight (81 kg)	Nacif Elias (LIB)	Antoine Valois-Fortier (CAN)	Rijad Dedeić (MNE)
Half-middleweight (81 kg)	Nacif Elias (LIB)	Antoine Valois-Fortier (CAN)	Jérémie Bottieau (Wallonia)
Middleweight (90 kg)	Anthony Laignes (FRA)	Imad Abdallaoui (MAR)	Donald More Ebene (CMR)
Middleweight (90 kg)	Anthony Laignes (FRA)	Imad Abdallaoui (MAR)	Ahmed Lahmadi (TUN)
Half-heavyweight (100 kg)	Clément Delvert (FRA)	Amdy Fall (SEN)	Mark Fortner (New Brunswick)
Heavyweight (+100 kg)	El Mehdi Malki (MAR)	Damian Nasiadko (POL)	Vlăduț Simionescu (ROU)

=== Women ===
Event	Gold	Silver	Bronze
Extra-lightweight (48 kg)	Anne-Sophie Jura (Wallonia)	Diana Kovacs (ROU)	Salha Al-Badi (QAT)
Extra-lightweight (48 kg)	Anne-Sophie Jura (Wallonia)	Diana Kovacs (ROU)	Sonia Benabdelouahed (FRA)
Half-lightweight (52 kg)	Lucile Duport (FRA)	Cristina Matei (ROU)	Nica Antonis (Wallonia)
Half-lightweight (52 kg)	Lucile Duport (FRA)	Cristina Matei (ROU)	Linouse Desravine (HAI)
Lightweight (57 kg)	Morgane Brunet (FRA)	Loredana Ohai (ROU)	Zouleiha Abzetta Dabonne (CIV)
Lightweight (57 kg)	Morgane Brunet (FRA)	Loredana Ohai (ROU)	Catherine Beauchemin-Pinard (CAN)
Half-middleweight (63 kg)	Sandrine Billiet (Wallonia)	Bibiene Fopa (CMR)	Clémentine Louchez (FRA)
Half-middleweight (63 kg)	Sandrine Billiet (Wallonia)	Bibiene Fopa (CMR)	Sofia Belattar (MAR)
Middleweight (70 kg)	Kelita Zupancic (CAN)	Lola Mansour (Wallonia)	Lucie Perrot (FRA)
Middleweight (70 kg)	Kelita Zupancic (CAN)	Lola Mansour (Wallonia)	Alix Renaud-Roy (QBC)
Half-heavyweight (78 kg)	Katarzyna Furmanek (POL)	Sarra Mzougui (TUN)	Ana Laura Portuondo Isasi (CAN)
Half-heavyweight (78 kg)	Katarzyna Furmanek (POL)	Sarra Mzougui (TUN)	Christelle Garry (FRA)
Heavyweight (+78 kg)	Joanna Jaworska (POL)	Sahar Trabelsi (TUN)	Monica Sagna (SEN)

=== Medal table ===
Rank	Nation	Gold	Silver	Bronze	Total
1	France (FRA)*	6	1	4	11
2	Canada (CAN)	2	2	3	7
3	(Wallonia) French Community of Belgium	2	1	2	5
4	Poland (POL)	2	1	1	4
5	Morocco (MAR)	1	1	1	3
6	Lebanon (LIB)	1	0	0	1
7	Romania (ROU)	0	3	1	4
8	Tunisia (TUN)	0	2	2	4
9	Cameroon (CMR)	0	1	1	2
9	Quebec (QBC)	0	1	1	2
9	Senegal (SEN)	0	1	1	2
12	Armenia (ARM)	0	0	2	2
13	Haiti (HAI)	0	0	1	1
13	Ivory Coast (CIV)	0	0	1	1
13	Montenegro (MNE)	0	0	1	1
13	New Brunswick	0	0	1	1
13	Qatar (QAT)	0	0	1	1
13	Switzerland (SUI)	0	0	1	1
Totals (18 entries)		14	14	25	53
