= Assmaa Niang =

Moroccan judoka (born 1983)

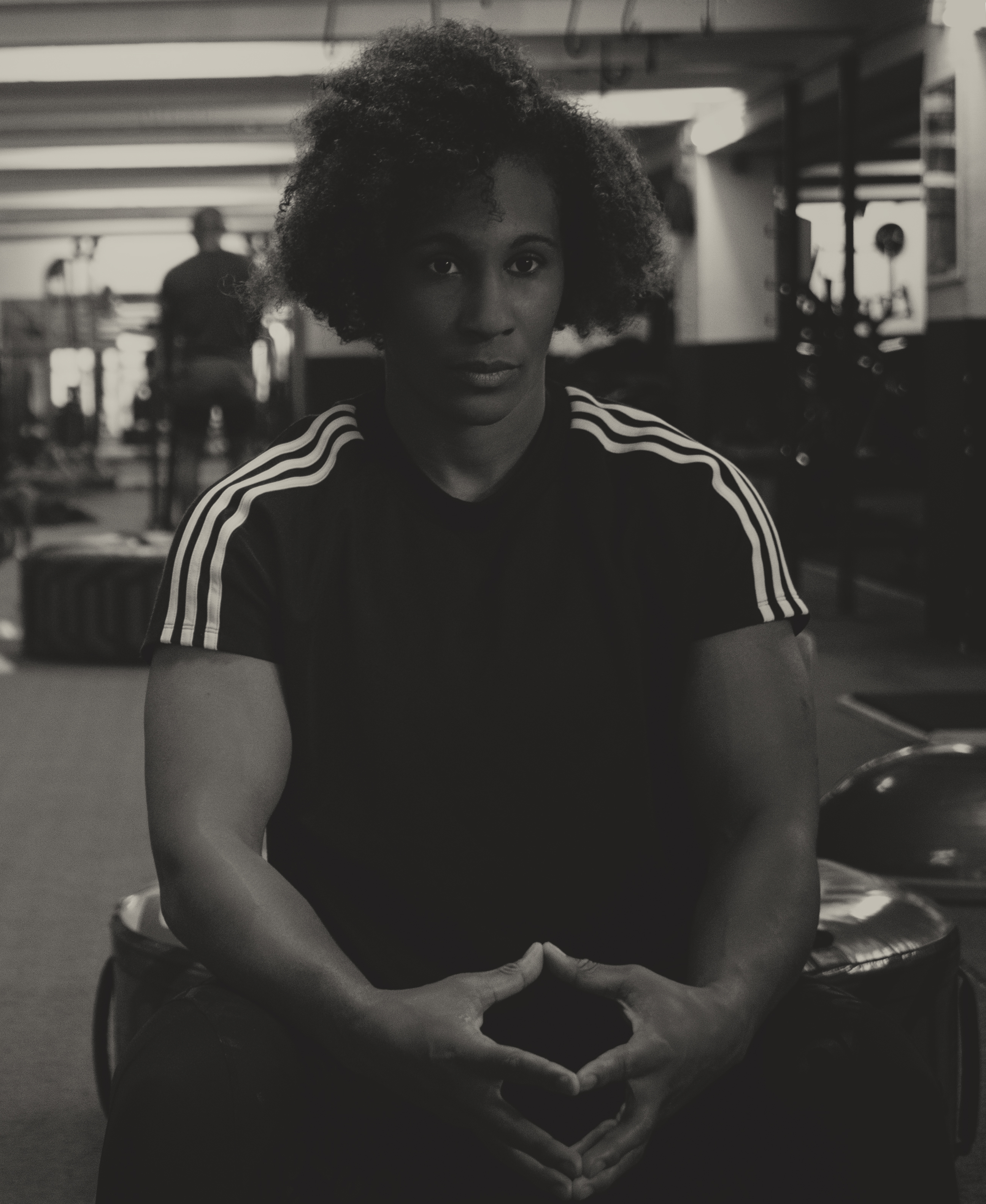
- Niang in 2019

Personal information
- Born: 4 January 1983 (age 43)
- Occupation: Judoka

Sport
- Country: Morocco
- Sport: Judo
- Weight class: ‍–‍70 kg
- Club: Judo Club Pontault-Combault

Achievements and titles
- Olympic Games: R32 (2016, 2020)
- World Champ.: 5th (2017, 2018)
- African Champ.: (gold) (2013, 2016, 2017, 2018, 2020)
Medal record
Women's judo
Representing Morocco
African Championships
Gold medal – first place	2013 Maputo	‍–‍70 kg
Gold medal – first place	2016 Tunis	‍–‍70 kg
Gold medal – first place	2017 Antananarivo	‍–‍70 kg
Gold medal – first place	2018 Tunis	‍–‍70 kg
Gold medal – first place	2020 Antananarivo	‍–‍70 kg
Silver medal – second place	2015 Libreville	‍–‍70 kg
Silver medal – second place	2024 Cairo	‍–‍70 kg
Bronze medal – third place	2012 Agadir	‍–‍70 kg
Bronze medal – third place	2014 Port Louis	‍–‍70 kg
IJF Grand Slam
Bronze medal – third place	2019 Ekaterinburg	‍–‍70 kg
IJF Grand Prix
Gold medal – first place	2014 Düsseldorf	‍–‍70 kg
Gold medal – first place	2018 Agadir	‍–‍70 kg
Silver medal – second place	2013 Samsun	‍–‍70 kg
Silver medal – second place	2014 Qingdao	‍–‍70 kg
Bronze medal – third place	2014 Samsun	‍–‍70 kg
Bronze medal – third place	2014 Jeju	‍–‍70 kg
Bronze medal – third place	2016 Tbilisi	‍–‍70 kg
Bronze medal – third place	2018 Zagreb	‍–‍70 kg

Profile at external databases
- IJF: 9444
- JudoInside.com: 45803
- Updated on 2 May 2024

Assmaa Niang (also spelled Asmaa or Asma, born 4 January 1983) is a Moroccan judoka, who has represented her country at international events. She is citizen of France, Morocco and Senegal.

Niang competed at the 2016 Summer Olympics in Rio de Janeiro, in the women's 70 kg.

Niang competed in the women's 70 kg event at the 2020 Summer Olympics.
