= 2021 African Judo Championships – Women's +78 kg =

Judo competition

Judo Women's +78 kg at the 2021 African Judo Championships
- Venue: Dakar Arena
- Location: Dakar, Senegal
- Date: 22 May 2021
- Competitors: 8 from 6 nations

Medalists
gold medal	Nihel Cheikh Rouhou	Tunisia
silver medal	Sonia Asselah	Algeria
bronze medal	Meroua Mammeri	Algeria
bronze medal	Monica Sagna	Senegal

Competition at external databases
- Links: IJF • JudoInside

The women's +78 kg competition in at the 2021 African Judo Championships was held on 22 May at the Dakar Arena in Dakar, Senegal.

== Results ==
=== Main Round ===
Quarterfinals
Nihel Cheikh Rouhou (TUN)	10
Viola Lorupe (KEN)	00
Essohanam Koro (TOG)	00
Meroua Mammeri (ALG)	10
Sonia Asselah (ALG)	11
Joaquina Silva (ANG)	00
Monica Sagna (SEN)	10
Perister Bosire (KEN)	00

Semifinals
Nihel Cheikh Rouhou (TUN)	10
Meroua Mammeri (ALG)	00
Sonia Asselah (ALG)	10
Monica Sagna (SEN)	00

Final
Nihel Cheikh Rouhou (TUN)	10
Sonia Asselah (ALG)	00

=== Repechage ===
Repechage		Bronze medal
Viola Lorupe (KEN)	00
Essohanam Koro (TOG)	11	Essohanam Koro (TOG)	00
		Monica Sagna (SEN)	10

Repechage		Bronze medal
Joaquina Silva (ANG)	10
Perister Bosire (KEN)	00	Joaquina Silva (ANG)	00
		Meroua Mammeri (ALG)	11
