= Zouleiha Dabonne =

Ivorian judoka (born 1992)

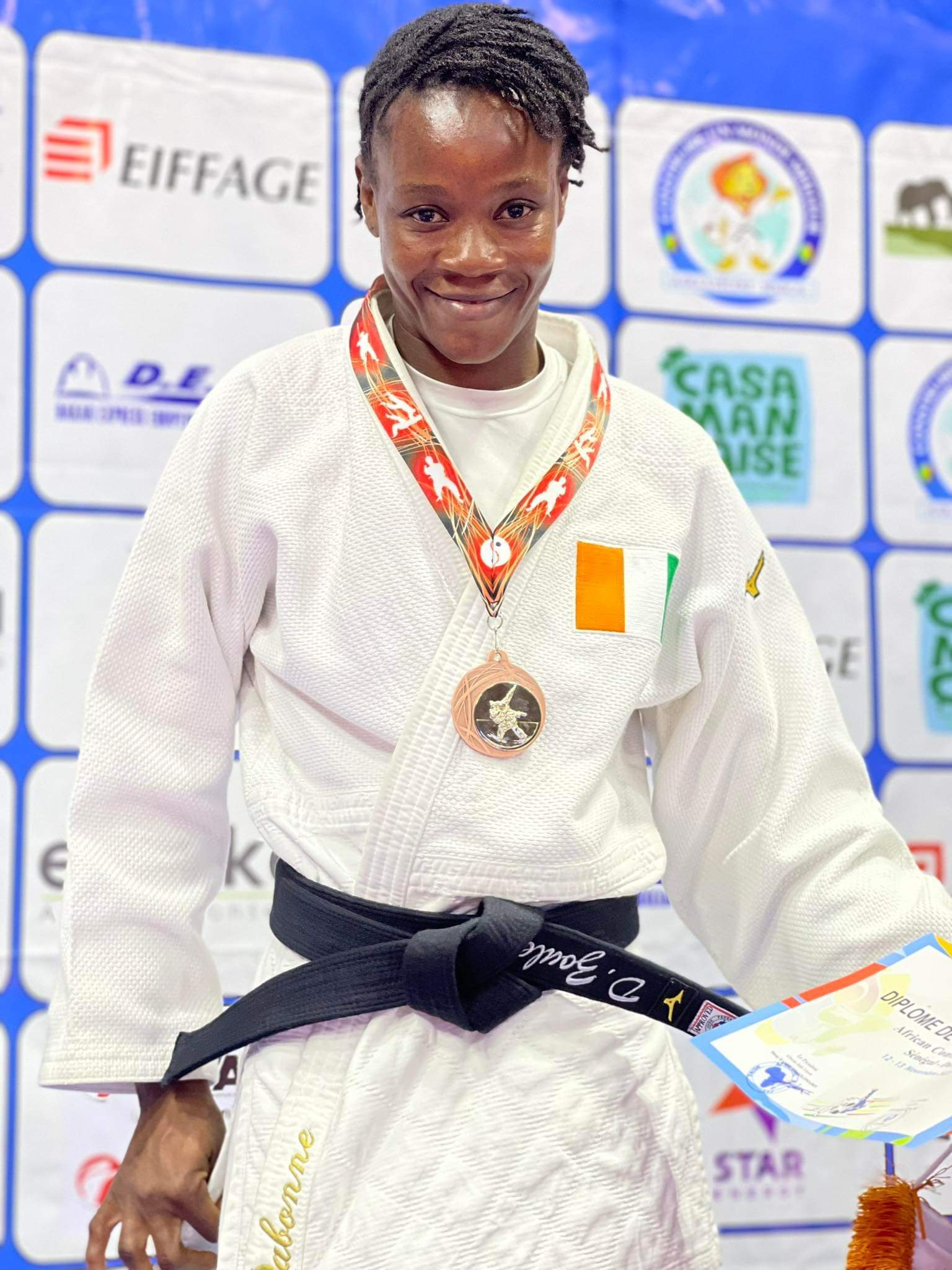

Personal information
- Nickname: Zoul
- Born: Zouleiha Abzetta Dabonne; 15 December 1992 (age 33)
- Occupation: Judoka

Sport
- Country: Ivory Coast
- Sport: Judo
- Weight class: ‍–‍52 kg, ‍–‍57 kg

Achievements and titles
- Olympic Games: R16 (2016)
- World Champ.: R32 (2019, 2021, 2022)
- African Champ.: (silver) (2020, 2023)
Medal record
Women's judo
Representing Ivory Coast
African Games
Silver medal – second place	2015 Brazzaville	‍–‍57 kg
Silver medal – second place	2023 Accra	‍–‍57 kg
African Championships
Silver medal – second place	2020 Antananarivo	‍–‍57 kg
Silver medal – second place	2023 Casablanca	‍–‍57 kg
Bronze medal – third place	2010 Yaounde	‍–‍52 kg
Bronze medal – third place	2012 Agadir	‍–‍52 kg
Bronze medal – third place	2016 Tunis	‍–‍57 kg
Bronze medal – third place	2017 Antananarivo	‍–‍57 kg
Bronze medal – third place	2021 Dakar	‍–‍57 kg
Bronze medal – third place	2022 Oran	‍–‍57 kg
Bronze medal – third place	2024 Cairo	‍–‍57 kg
Islamic Solidarity Games
Bronze medal – third place	2017 Baku	‍–‍57 kg
Bronze medal – third place	2021 Konya	‍–‍57 kg
Jeux de la Francophonie
Silver medal – second place	2017 Abidjan	‍–‍57 kg
Bronze medal – third place	2013 Nice	‍–‍57 kg

Profile at external databases
- IJF: 6877
- JudoInside.com: 79474
- Updated on 26 April 2024

Zouleiha Abzetta Dabonne (born 15 December 1992) is an Ivorian judoka. At the 2016 Summer Olympics she competed in the Women's ‍–‍57 kg. At the 2020 Summer Olympics, she competed in the women's 57 kg event.

In 2021, Dabonne won one of the bronze medals in her event at the 2021 African Judo Championships held in Dakar, Senegal.
