= Mohamed Mohyeldin =

Egyptian judoka (born 1991)

Personal information
- Nationality: Egyptian
- Born: 1 October 1991 (age 34)
- Occupation: Judoka
- Height: 170 cm (5 ft 7 in)
- Weight: 73 kg (161 lb)

Sport
- Sport: Judo
- Event: -73 kg
Medal record
Men's judo
Representing Egypt
Olympic Games
World Championships
African Games
Gold medal – first place	2015 Brazzaville	-73 kg
African Judo Championships
Gold medal – first place	2015 Libreville	-73 kg
Gold medal – first place	2016 Tunis	-73 kg
Gold medal – first place	2017 Antananarivo	-73 kg
Gold medal – first place	2020 Antananarivo	-73 kg
Silver medal – second place	2018 Tunis	-73 kg
Silver medal – second place	2019 Cape Town	-73 kg
Bronze medal – third place	2014 Port-Louis	-73 kg
Mediterranean Games
Bronze medal – third place	2018 Tarragona	-73 kg
IJF World Masters
IJF Grand Slam
IJF Grand Prix

Profile at external databases
- IJF: 3953
- JudoInside.com: 70095

Mohamed Mohyeldin (born 1 October 1991) is an Egyptian judoka. At the 2016 Summer Olympics he competed in the Men's -73kg.
