= Mohamed Abdelaal =

Egyptian judoka (born 1990)

Personal information
- Native name: محمد علي على أحمد عبدالعال
- Full name: Mohamed Ali Ahmad Abdelaal
- Born: 23 July 1990 (age 35)
- Occupation: Judoka
- Height: 1.75 m (5 ft 9 in)

Sport
- Country: Egypt
- Sport: Judo
- Weight class: ‍–‍81 kg

Achievements and titles
- Olympic Games: R16 (2016)
- World Champ.: 5th (2019)
- African Champ.: (gold) (2016, 2017, 2018, 2019)
Medal record
Men's judo
Representing Egypt
African Games
Gold medal – first place	2015 Brazzaville	‍–‍81 kg
African Championships
Gold medal – first place	2016 Tunis	‍–‍81 kg
Gold medal – first place	2017 Antananarivo	‍–‍81 kg
Gold medal – first place	2018 Tunis	‍–‍81 kg
Gold medal – first place	2019 Cape Town	‍–‍81 kg
Silver medal – second place	2020 Antananarivo	‍–‍81 kg
Bronze medal – third place	2013 Maputo	‍–‍81 kg
Bronze medal – third place	2015 Libreville	‍–‍81 kg
Bronze medal – third place	2021 Dakar	‍–‍81 kg
World Masters
Bronze medal – third place	2016 Guadalajara	‍–‍81 kg

Profile at external databases
- IJF: 6998
- JudoInside.com: 77162
- Updated on 20 November 2022

Mohamed Ali Ahmad Abdelaal (Arabic: محمد علي على أحمد عبدالعال; born 23 July 1990) is an Egyptian judoka.

== Professional career ==
He competed at the 2016 Summer Olympics in the men's 81 kg event, in which he was eliminated by Khasan Khalmurzaev in the third round.

Abdelaal competed at the 2020 Summer Olympics in the men's 81 kg event.
