= Christianne Legentil =

Mauritian judoka (born 1992)

Personal information
- Born: 27 May 1992 (age 34)
- Occupation: Judoka

Sport
- Country: Mauritius
- Sport: Judo
- Weight class: ‍–‍48 kg, ‍–‍52 kg, ‍–‍57 kg

Achievements and titles
- Olympic Games: 7th (2012, 2016)
- World Champ.: R32 (2013, 2014, 2022)
- African Champ.: (silver) (2014, 2015, 2017, 2022)
- Commonwealth Games: (bronze) (2022)
Medal record
Women's judo
Representing Mauritius
African Championships
Silver medal – second place	2014 Port Louis	‍–‍52 kg
Silver medal – second place	2015 Libreville	‍–‍52 kg
Silver medal – second place	2017 Antananarivo	‍–‍52 kg
Silver medal – second place	2022 Oran	‍–‍57 kg
Bronze medal – third place	2009 Mauritius	‍–‍48 kg
Bronze medal – third place	2013 Maputo	‍–‍52 kg
IJF Grand Prix
Silver medal – second place	2014 Astana	‍–‍52 kg
Bronze medal – third place	2014 Qingdao	‍–‍52 kg
African Junior Championships
Silver medal – second place	2011 Antananarivo	‍–‍52 kg
Commonwealth Games
Bronze medal – third place	2022 Birmingham	‍–‍57 kg

Profile at external databases
- IJF: 10510
- JudoInside.com: 57063
- Updated on 9 October 2022

Marie Christianne Legentil (born 27 May 1992, in Port Mathurin) is a Mauritian judoka who competes in the women's 52 kg category. At the 2012 Summer Olympics, she won against later double world champion Majlinda Kelmendi and was defeated in the quarter finals. In 2014 and 2015 she was runner up at the African Championships. In 2014, she was winner of the African Open Port Louis 2014 –52 kg. At the 2016 Summer Olympics, she again met Majlinda Kelmendi but this time she lost to the eventual gold medalist in the quarter finals.

In 2019, she competed in the women's 52 kg event at the 2019 World Judo Championships held in Tokyo, Japan.
