= Kaouthar Ouallal =

Algerian judoka (born 1990)

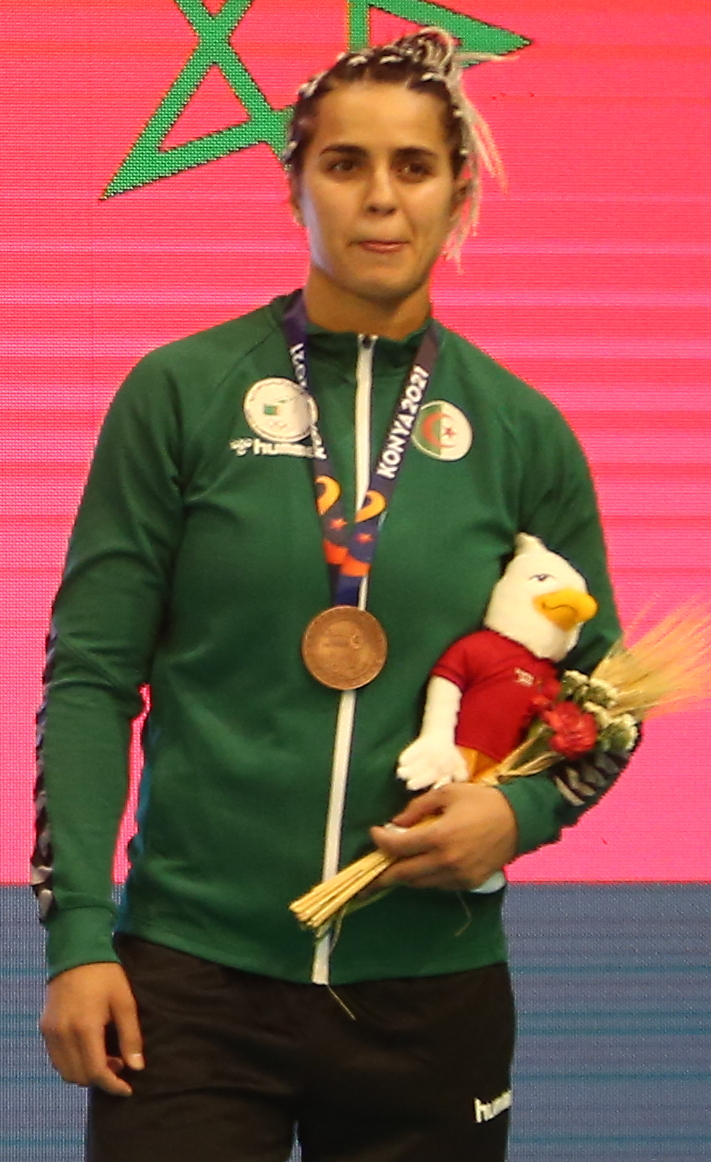

Personal information
- Born: 27 November 1990 (age 35)
- Occupation: Judoka

Sport
- Country: Algeria
- Sport: Judo
- Weight class: –78 kg

Achievements and titles
- World Champ.: R32 (2014, 2017, 2019, 2021)
- African Champ.: (gold) (2010, 2014, 2015, 2017, 2018, 2019, 2022)
Medal record
Women's judo
Representing Algeria
African Games
Gold medal – first place	2015 Brazzaville	–78 kg
Bronze medal – third place	2019 Rabat	–78 kg
African Championships
Gold medal – first place	2010 Yaounde	–78 kg
Gold medal – first place	2014 Port Louis	–78 kg
Gold medal – first place	2015 Libreville	–78 kg
Gold medal – first place	2017 Antananarivo	–78 kg
Gold medal – first place	2018 Tunis	–78 kg
Gold medal – first place	2019 Cape Town	–78 kg
Gold medal – first place	2022 Oran	–78 kg
Silver medal – second place	2011 Dakar	–78 kg
Bronze medal – third place	2013 Maputo	–78 kg
Bronze medal – third place	2013 Maputo	Open
Bronze medal – third place	2016 Tunis	–78 kg
Bronze medal – third place	2020 Antananarivo	–78 kg
Bronze medal – third place	2021 Dakar	–78 kg
Islamic Solidarity Games
Bronze medal – third place	2017 Baku	–78 kg
Bronze medal – third place	2021 Konya	–78 kg
Bronze medal – third place	2021 Konya	Women's team

Profile at external databases
- IJF: 1248
- JudoInside.com: 61933
- Updated on 20 August 2025

Kaouthar Ouallal (born 27 November 1990) is an Algerian judoka. She won the gold medal in the women's 78 kg event at the 2015 African Games. She is also a seven-time gold medalist at the African Judo Championships.

== Career ==
In 2019, she won the gold medal in the women's 78 kg event at the African Judo Championships held in Cape Town, South Africa. She also competed in the women's 78 kg event at the 2019 World Judo Championships in Tokyo, Japan.

At the 2021 African Judo Championships in Dakar, Senegal, she won a bronze medal in her event. She competed in the women's 78 kg event at the 2021 World Judo Championships held in Budapest, Hungary.

== Achievements ==
Year	Tournament	Place	Weight class
2015	African Games	1st	−78 kg
2017	Islamic Solidarity Games	3rd	−78 kg
2019	African Games	3rd	−78 kg
