= Fraj Dhouibi =

Tunisian judoka (born 1991)

Personal information
- Born: 14 September 1991 (age 35)
- Occupation: Judoka

Sport
- Country: Tunisia
- Sport: Judo
- Weight class: ‍–‍60 kg

Achievements and titles
- World Champ.: R32 (2014, 2023)
- African Champ.: (gold) (2014, 2017, 2019, 2020)
Medal record
Men's judo
Representing Tunisia
African Games
Silver medal – second place	2019 Rabat	‍–‍60 kg
Silver medal – second place	2023 Accra	‍–‍60 kg
Bronze medal – third place	2015 Brazzaville	‍–‍60 kg
African Championships
Gold medal – first place	2014 Port Louis	‍–‍60 kg
Gold medal – first place	2017 Antananarivo	‍–‍60 kg
Gold medal – first place	2019 Cape Town	‍–‍60 kg
Gold medal – first place	2020 Antananarivo	‍–‍60 kg
Silver medal – second place	2011 Dakar	‍–‍60 kg
Silver medal – second place	2012 Agadir	‍–‍60 kg
Silver medal – second place	2016 Tunis	‍–‍60 kg
Silver medal – second place	2018 Tunis	‍–‍60 kg
Silver medal – second place	2022 Oran	‍–‍60 kg
Bronze medal – third place	2013 Maputo	‍–‍60 kg
Bronze medal – third place	2025 Abidjan	‍–‍60 kg
Mediterranean Games
Silver medal – second place	2018 Tarragona	‍–‍60 kg
Silver medal – second place	2022 Oran	‍–‍60 kg
Pan Arab Games
Bronze medal – third place	2011 Doha	‍–‍60 kg

Profile at external databases
- IJF: 1582
- JudoInside.com: 57003
- Updated on 27 April 2025

Fraj Dhouibi (born 14 September 1991) is a Tunisian judoka. He is a three-time medalist at the African Games. He also won ten medals at the African Judo Championships, including four gold medals.

== Career ==
In 2011, he won one of the bronze medals in the men's 60 kg event at the 2011 Pan Arab Games held in Doha, Qatar. At the 2015 African Games held in Brazzaville, Republic of the Congo, he also won one of the bronze medals in the men's 60 kg event.

In 2019, he represented Tunisia at the 2019 African Games held in Rabat, Morocco and he won the silver medal in the men's 60 kg event. In the same year, he also won the gold medal in the men's 60 kg event at the 2019 African Judo Championships held in Cape Town, South Africa. He repeated this with the gold medal in this event at the 2020 African Judo Championships held in Antananarivo, Madagascar.

In 2021, he competed in the men's 60 kg event at the 2021 Judo World Masters held in Doha, Qatar.

In 2022, Dhouibi won silver medals at the African Judo Championships and the Mediterranean Games, both held in Oran, Algeria, and gold medals at the Tunis and Algiers African Opens.

== Achievements ==
Year	Tournament	Place	Weight class
2011	Pan Arab Games	3rd	60 kg
2015	African Games	3rd	60 kg
2019	African Championships	1st	60 kg
2019	African Games	2nd	60 kg
2020	African Championships	1st	60 kg
2024	African Games	2nd	60 kg
