= Diassonema Mucungui =

Angolan judoka (born 1996)

Personal information
- Born: 6 June 1996 (age 30)
- Occupation: Judoka

Sport
- Country: Angola
- Sport: Judo
- Weight class: ‍–‍57 kg, ‍–‍63 kg

Achievements and titles
- Olympic Games: R32 (2020)
- World Champ.: R32 (2019, 2023)
- African Champ.: (gold) (2020, 2026)
Medal record
Women's judo
Representing Angola
African Games
Bronze medal – third place	2019 Rabat	‍–‍57 kg
African Championships
Gold medal – first place	2020 Antananarivo	‍–‍57 kg
Gold medal – first place	2026 Nairobi	‍–‍70 kg
Silver medal – second place	2023 Casablanca	‍–‍63 kg
Bronze medal – third place	2017 Antananarivo	‍–‍57 kg
Bronze medal – third place	2019 Cape Town	‍–‍57 kg
Bronze medal – third place	2025 Abidjan	‍–‍70 kg

Profile at external databases
- IJF: 37977
- JudoInside.com: 113718
- Updated on 26 April 2026

Diassonema Mucungui (born 6 June 1996) is an Angolan judoka. She is a bronze medalist at the African Games and a three-time medalist at the African Judo Championships. She represented Angola at the 2020 Summer Olympics held in Tokyo, Japan.

== Career ==
In 2019, she won one of the bronze medals in the women's 57 kg event at the African Judo Championships held in Cape Town, South Africa. In 2020, she won the gold medal in this event at the African Judo Championships held in Antananarivo, Madagascar.

She competed in the women's 57 kg event at the 2021 Judo World Masters held in Doha, Qatar. She also competed in the women's 57 kg event at the 2020 Summer Olympics held in Tokyo, Japan.

== Achievements ==
Year	Tournament	Place	Weight class
2017	African Championships	3rd	−57 kg
2019	African Championships	3rd	−57 kg
2019	African Games	3rd	−57 kg
2020	African Championships	1st	−57 kg
2023	African Championships	2nd	−63 kg
