= Ahmed Abdelrahman (judoka) =

Egyptian judoka (born 1996)

Personal information
- Born: 26 May 1996 (age 30)
- Occupation: Judoka

Sport
- Country: Egypt
- Sport: Judo
- Weight class: ‍–‍60 kg, ‍–‍66 kg

Achievements and titles
- Olympic Games: R32 (2016)
- World Champ.: R16 (2018)
- African Champ.: (gold) (2016, 2021)
Medal record
Men's judo
Representing Egypt
African Games
Gold medal – first place	2015 Brazzaville	‍–‍60 kg
African Championships
Gold medal – first place	2016 Tunis	‍–‍60 kg
Gold medal – first place	2021 Dakar	‍–‍66 kg
Silver medal – second place	2018 Tunis	‍–‍66 kg
Silver medal – second place	2020 Antananarivo	‍–‍66 kg
Silver medal – second place	2024 Cairo	‍–‍66 kg
Bronze medal – third place	2017 Antananarivo	‍–‍66 kg
Bronze medal – third place	2019 Cape Town	‍–‍66 kg
Bronze medal – third place	2023 Casablanca	‍–‍66 kg
African Junior Championships
Gold medal – first place	2015 Sharm El Sheikh	‍–‍60 kg

Profile at external databases
- IJF: 13770
- JudoInside.com: 22543, 164233
- Updated on 4 May 2024

Ahmed Abdelrahman (born 26 May 1996) is an Egyptian judoka.

In 2015, Abdelrahman won the gold medal in the men's 60 kg event at the 2015 African Games held in Brazzaville, Congo.

Abdelrahman competed at the 2016 Summer Olympics in Rio de Janeiro, in the men's 60 kg. He lost in the first round.

At the 2021 African Judo Championships held in Dakar, Senegal, Abdelrahman won the gold medal in the men's 66 kg event.
