= 2020 African Judo Championships =

Judo competition

- Location: Antananarivo, Madagascar
- Dates: 17–20 December 2020

The 2020 African Judo Championships took place in Antananarivo, Madagascar, from 17 to 20 December 2020.

The championships were originally scheduled to be held in Casablanca from 16 to 19 April, then in Rabat from 28 to 30 November, but were postponed both times due to the COVID-19 pandemic.

== Medal overview ==
=== Men ===
Event	Gold	Silver	Bronze
−60 kg	Fraj Dhouibi; Tunisia	Issam Bassou; Morocco	Alexandre de Barros e Silva; Cape Verde Bernadin Tsala Tsala; Cameroon
−66 kg	Mohamed Abdelmawgoud; Egypt	Ahmed Abelrahman; Egypt	Steven Mungandu; Zambia Imad Bassou; Morocco
−73 kg	Mohamed Mohyeldin; Egypt	Ahmed El Meziati; Morocco	Fethi Nourine; Algeria Aden-Alexandre Houssein; Djibouti
−81 kg	Abdelrahman Mohamed; Egypt	Mohamed Abdelaal; Egypt	Achraf Moutii; Morocco Fetra Ratsimiziva; Madagascar
−90 kg	Hatem Abd el Akher; Egypt	Abderrahmane Benamadi; Algeria	Ali Hazem; Egypt Rémi Feuillet; Mauritius
−100 kg	Ramadan Darwish; Egypt	Koffi Krémé Kobena; Ivory Coast	Lwazi Mapitiza; South Africa Luc Manongho; Gabon
+100 kg	Mbagnick Ndiaye; Senegal	Mohamed Sofiane Belrekaa; Algeria	Ahmed Wahid; Egypt Ali Omar; Libya

=== Women ===
Event	Gold	Silver	Bronze
−48 kg	Geronay Whitebooi; South Africa	Aziza Chakir; Morocco	Signoline Kanyamuneza; Burundi Priscilla Morand; Mauritius
−52 kg	Taciana César; Guinea-Bissau	Soumiya Iraoui; Morocco	Salimata Fofana; Ivory Coast Charne Griesel; South Africa
−57 kg	Diassonema Mucungui; Angola	Zouleiha Abzetta Dabonne; Ivory Coast	Narindra Rakotovao; Madagascar Ghofran Khelifi; Tunisia
−63 kg	Amina Belkadi; Algeria	Sofia Belattar; Morocco	Enku Ekuta; Nigeria Hélène Wezeu Dombeu; Cameroon
−70 kg	Assmaa Niang; Morocco	Ayuk Otay Arrey Sophina; Cameroon	Anastasiya-Alexandra Nenova; South Africa Carine Ngarlemdana; Chad
−78 kg	Marie Branser; DR Congo	Sarah Myriam Mazouz; Gabon	Kaouthar Ouallal; Algeria
+78 kg	Hortence Vanessa Mballa Atangana; Cameroon	Sonia Asselah; Algeria	Monica Sagna; Senegal Haingoniaina Durianah Ramiandrisoa; Madagascar

=== Team ===
Event	Gold	Silver	Bronze
Mixed	Algeria	Senegal	Madagascar Kenya

=== Medal table ===
* Host nation (Madagascar)

Rank	Nation	Gold	Silver	Bronze	Total
1	Egypt	5	2	2	9
2	Algeria	2	3	2	7
3	Morocco	1	5	2	8
4	Cameroon	1	1	2	4
5	Senegal	1	1	1	3
6	South Africa	1	0	3	4
7	Tunisia	1	0	1	2
8	Angola	1	0	0	1
8	DR Congo	1	0	0	1
8	Guinea-Bissau	1	0	0	1
11	Ivory Coast	0	2	1	3
12	Gabon	0	1	1	2
13	Madagascar*	0	0	4	4
14	Mauritius	0	0	2	2
15	Burundi	0	0	1	1
15	Cape Verde	0	0	1	1
15	Chad	0	0	1	1
15	Djibouti	0	0	1	1
15	Kenya	0	0	1	1
15	Libya	0	0	1	1
15	Nigeria	0	0	1	1
15	Zambia	0	0	1	1
Totals (22 entries)		15	15	29	59
