= 2011 African Judo Championships =

Judo competition

2011 Judo African Judo Championships
- Venue: Dakar
- Location: Senegal
- Date: 2011
- Competitors: 169 from 27 nations

Competition at external databases
- Links: IJF • JudoInside

The 2011 African Judo Championships were the 32nd edition of the African Judo Championships, and were held in Dakar, Senegal from 14 April to 17 April 2011.

== Medal overview ==
=== Men ===
Event	Gold	Silver	Bronze
60 kg	(Libya) Mohamed ElKawisah	(Tunisia) Fraj Dhouibi	(Algeria) Salim Attouche (Senegal) Moustapha Dione
66 kg	(Egypt) Ahmed Awad	(Libya) Ahmed ElKawisah	(Algeria) Youcef Nouari (South Africa) Siyabulela Mabulu
73 kg	(South Africa) Gideon van Zyl	(Egypt) Hussein Hafiz	(Senegal) Mamadou Ndiaye (Algeria) Larbi Grini
81 kg	(Algeria) Abderahmane Benamadi	(Madagascar) Fetra Ratsimiziva	(Morocco) Safouane Attaf (Angola) Angelo António
90 kg	(Algeria) Amar Benikhlef	(South Africa) Patrick Trezise	(Morocco) Mohamed El Assri (Cameroon) Dieudonne Dolassem
100 kg	(Egypt) Ramadan Darwish	(Tunisia) Anis Ben Khaled	(Morocco) Adil Fikri (South Africa) Johannes Pretorius
+100 kg	(Egypt) Islam El Shehaby	(Tunisia) Faycal Jaballah	(Algeria) Mohamed Bouaichaoui (Morocco) El Mehdi Malki
Open class	(Egypt) Islam El Shehaby	(Tunisia) Faycal Jaballah	(Morocco) Jalal Benalla (Algeria) Ammar Belgacem

=== Women ===
Event	Gold	Silver	Bronze
48 kg	(Tunisia) Amani Khalfaoui	(Cameroon) Philomene Bata	(Gabon) Sandrine Ilendou (Morocco) Wafae Idrissi Chorfi
52 kg	(Algeria) Soraya Haddad	(Morocco) Hanane Kerroumi	(Cameroon) Ngandeu Weyinjam (Gabon) Raisa Lebomie
57 kg	(Senegal) Hortense Diedhiou	(Tunisia) Nesrine Jlassi	(Algeria) Ratiba Tariket (Morocco) Fatima Zohra Ait Ali
63 kg	(Burkina Faso) Séverine Nébié	(Algeria) Kahina Saidi	(Morocco) Rizlen Zouak (Senegal) Fary Seye
70 kg	(Tunisia) Houda Miled	(Angola) Antonia Moreira	(Algeria) Kahina Hadid (Egypt) Samar Salah
78 kg	(Tunisia) Hana Mareghni	(Algeria) Kaouther Ouallal	(Gabon) Audrey Koumba (Egypt) Nada Tarek
+78 kg	(Tunisia) Nihel Cheikh Rouhou	(Morocco) Rania El Kilali	(Algeria) Sonia Asselah (Cameroon) Dechantal Fokou Ntiolack
Open class	(Tunisia) Nihel Cheikh Rouhou	(Morocco) Rania El Kilali	(Algeria) Amina Temmar (Senegal) Monica Sagna

=== Medals table ===
Rank	Nation	Gold	Silver	Bronze	Total
1	Tunisia	5	5	0	10
2	Egypt	4	1	2	7
3	Algeria	3	2	9	14
4	South Africa	1	1	2	4
5	Libya	1	1	0	2
6	Senegal	1	0	4	5
7	Burkina Faso	1	0	0	1
8	Morocco	0	3	8	11
9	Cameroon	0	1	3	4
10	Angola	0	1	1	2
11	Madagascar	0	1	0	1
12	Gabon	0	0	3	3
Totals (12 entries)		16	16	32	64
