= Marie Branser =

German-born Congolese-Guinean judoka

Personal information
- Born: 15 August 1992 (age 34)
- Home town: Leipzig, Germany
- Education: University of Leipzig
- Occupation: Judoka
- Website: www.mariebranser.com

Sport
- Country: Germany (until 2019); Democratic Republic of the Congo (2019–2022); Guinea (since 2022)
- Sport: Judo
- Weight class: ‍–‍78 kg

Achievements and titles
- Olympic Games: R16 (2024)
- World Champ.: R16 (2025)
- African Champ.: (gold) (2020, 2021, 2023, 2024, 2025)
Medal record
Women's judo
Representing Guinea
African Games
Gold medal – first place	2023 Accra	‍–‍78 kg
African Championships
Gold medal – first place	2023 Casablanca	‍–‍78 kg
Gold medal – first place	2024 Cairo	‍–‍78 kg
Gold medal – first place	2025 Abidjan	‍–‍78 kg
Silver medal – second place	2026 Nairobi	‍–‍78 kg
IJF Grand Prix
Gold medal – first place	2026 Linz	‍–‍78 kg
Silver medal – second place	2025 Zagreb	‍–‍78 kg
Bronze medal – third place	2026 Lima	‍–‍78 kg
Representing Democratic Republic of the Congo
African Championships
Gold medal – first place	2020 Antananarivo	‍–‍78 kg
Gold medal – first place	2021 Dakar	‍–‍78 kg

Profile at external databases
- IJF: 55527, 12310, 71294
- JudoInside.com: 74793
- Updated on 17 August 2026

Marie Branser (born 15 August 1992 in Leipzig) is a German-born Guinean judoka, who formerly also represented the Democratic Republic of the Congo at the Olympics. She is a four-time African Judo Championships gold medalist. In 2021, she competed in the women's 78 kg event at the 2020 Summer Olympics in Tokyo, Japan.

== Career ==
=== Germany ===
Branser won one silver and three bronze medals at the German National Judo Championships, but she never represented Germany on the senior major international tournament.

=== DR Congo ===
In 2019, she changed her nationality to Congolese to try to qualify for the 2020 Summer Olympic Games. She still lived and trained in Leipzig while representing the Democratic Republic of the Congo in international competitions.

In 2020, she won the gold medal in the women's 78 kg event at the 2020 African Judo Championships held in Antananarivo, Madagascar.

In May 2021, she retained her championship title after winning the women's 78 kg event at the 2021 African Judo Championships held in Dakar, Senegal.

=== Guinea ===
In 2022, Branser decided to change nationality to Guinea, citing inactivity and negligence of the Congolese Judo Federation since the Olympics. Following the switch, she went on to win the 2022 African Open at Dakar in her first outing for Guinea.

== Achievements ==
Year	Tournament	Place	Result	Event
Representing Democratic Republic of the Congo
2020	African Championships	Antananarivo, Madagascar	1st	Half-heavyweight (78 kg)
2021	African Championships	Dakar, Senegal	1st	Half-heavyweight (78 kg)
2021	Olympic Games	Tokyo, Japan	17th	Half-heavyweight (78 kg)
