= Hortence Mballa Atangana =

Cameroonian judoka (born 1992)

Personal information
- Full name: Hortence Vanessa Mballa Atangana
- Born: 5 January 1992 (age 34) Bikok, Cameroon
- Occupation: Judoka

Sport
- Country: Cameroon
- Sport: Judo
- Weight class: ‍–‍78 kg, +78 kg

Achievements and titles
- Olympic Games: R32 (2016, 2020)
- World Champ.: R16 (2019)
- African Champ.: (gold) (2016, 2016, 2017, 2020)
- Commonwealth Games: (bronze) (2014)
Medal record
Women's judo
Representing Cameroon
African Games
Silver medal – second place	2019 Rabat	+78 kg
Bronze medal – third place	2015 Brazzaville	‍–‍78 kg
African Championships
Gold medal – first place	2016 Tunis	‍–‍78 kg
Gold medal – first place	2016 Tunis	Open
Gold medal – first place	2017 Antananarivo	Open
Gold medal – first place	2020 Antananarivo	+78 kg
Silver medal – second place	2019 Cape Town	+78 kg
Bronze medal – third place	2013 Maputo	‍–‍78 kg
Bronze medal – third place	2014 Port Louis	‍–‍78 kg
Bronze medal – third place	2015 Libreville	‍–‍78 kg
Bronze medal – third place	2017 Antananarivo	+78 kg
Bronze medal – third place	2018 Tunis	+78 kg
Bronze medal – third place	2018 Tunis	Open
IJF Grand Slam
Bronze medal – third place	2020 Düsseldorf	+78 kg
Bronze medal – third place	2021 Antalya	+78 kg
IJF Grand Prix
Silver medal – second place	2018 The Hague	+78 kg
Bronze medal – third place	2019 Marrakesh	+78 kg
Commonwealth Games
Bronze medal – third place	2014 Glasgow	‍–‍78 kg

Profile at external databases
- IJF: 7231
- JudoInside.com: 79902
- Updated on 21 November 2022

Hortence Vanessa Mballa Atangana (born 5 January 1992 in Bikok) is a Cameroonian judoka. At the 2016 Summer Olympics she competed in the Women's -78kg.

In 2019, she won the silver medal in the women's +78 kg event at the 2019 African Games held in Rabat, Morocco.

In 2021, she competed in the women's +78 kg event at the 2021 World Judo Championships held in Budapest, Hungary.

At the 2020 Summer Olympics, she competed in the women's +78kg event.
