= Antónia Moreira =

Angolan judoka

Personal information
- Born: 26 April 1982 (age 44) Luanda, Angola
- Occupation: Judoka

Sport
- Country: Angola
- Sport: Judo
- Weight class: –70 kg

Achievements and titles
- Olympic Games: R16 (2004, 2012, 2016)
- World Champ.: 7th (2013)
- African Champ.: (gold) (2005, 2014)
Medal record
Women's judo
Representing Angola
African Games
| Gold medal – first place | 2015 Brazzaville | –70 kg |
| Silver medal – second place | 2011 Maputo | –70 kg |
| Bronze medal – third place | 2007 Algiers | –70 kg |
African Championships
| Gold medal – first place | 2005 Port Elizabeth | –70 kg |
| Gold medal – first place | 2014 Port Louis | –70 kg |
| Silver medal – second place | 2004 Tunis | –70 kg |
| Silver medal – second place | 2011 Dakar | –70 kg |
| Silver medal – second place | 2012 Agadir | –70 kg |
| Silver medal – second place | 2013 Maputo | –70 kg |
| Bronze medal – third place | 2002 Cairo | –70 kg |
| Bronze medal – third place | 2008 Agadir | –70 kg |
| Bronze medal – third place | 2010 Yaounde | –70 kg |
| Bronze medal – third place | 2015 Libreville | –70 kg |
| Bronze medal – third place | 2016 Tunis | –70 kg |
IJF Grand Prix
| Bronze medal – third place | 2015 Ulaanbaatar | –70 kg |

Profile at external databases
- IJF: 5331
- JudoInside.com: 20923
- Updated on 16 December 2022

Antónia Moreira de Fátima (born 26 April 1982 in Luanda), nicknamed Faia, is an Angolan judoka.

She competed in the +70 kg division at the 2004 Summer Olympics and lost in the round of 16 to Kim Ryon-Mi of North Korea.

Moreira also won medals at the 2004 and 2005 African Judo Championships (gold in 2004, silver in 2005) as well as bronze medals at the 2007 All-Africa Games and the 2008 African Judo Championships and a gold medal at the 2015 African Games.

At the 2012 Olympic Games, she competed in the -70 kg division, and was knocked out in the second round by eventual bronze medallist Yuri Alvear.

At the 2016 Summer Olympics in Rio de Janeiro, she competed in the women's 70 kg division. She finished in 9th place after being defeated by Laura Vargas Koch of Germany in the second round.

Olympic Games
| Preceded by João N'Tyamba | Flagbearer for Angola; 2012 London | Succeeded by Luísa Kiala |
