= Sonia Asselah =

Algerian judoka (born 1991)

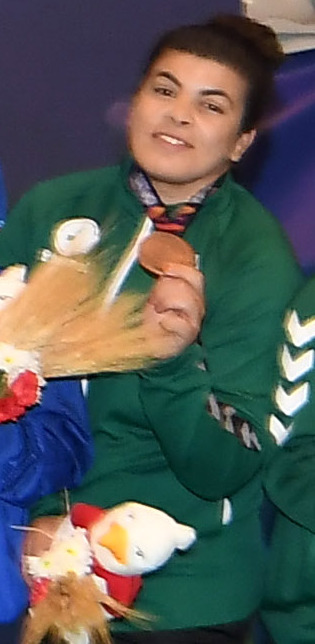

Personal information
- Born: 20 August 1991 (age 34) Tizi Ouzou
- Occupation: Judoka
- Height: 5 ft 9 in (175 cm)

Sport
- Country: Algeria
- Sport: Judo
- Weight class: +78 kg, Open

Achievements and titles
- Olympic Games: R16 (2016)
- World Champ.: R16 (2011)
- African Champ.: (gold) (2012, 2014, 2017)
Medal record
Women's judo
Representing Algeria
African Games
Silver medal – second place	2011 Maputo	+78 kg
Silver medal – second place	2015 Brazzaville	+78 kg
African Championships
Gold medal – first place	2012 Agadir	+78 kg
Gold medal – first place	2014 Port Louis	Open
Gold medal – first place	2017 Antananarivo	+78 kg
Silver medal – second place	2014 Port Louis	+78 kg
Silver medal – second place	2015 Libreville	Open
Silver medal – second place	2016 Tunis	+78 kg
Silver medal – second place	2016 Tunis	Open
Silver medal – second place	2017 Antananarivo	Open
Silver medal – second place	2018 Tunis	+78 kg
Silver medal – second place	2020 Antananarivo	+78 kg
Silver medal – second place	2021 Dakar	+78 kg
Bronze medal – third place	2010 Yaounde	+78 kg
Bronze medal – third place	2010 Yaounde	Open
Bronze medal – third place	2011 Dakar	+78 kg
Bronze medal – third place	2013 Maputo	+78 kg
Bronze medal – third place	2015 Libreville	+78 kg
Bronze medal – third place	2019 Cape Town	+78 kg
Bronze medal – third place	2022 Oran	+78 kg
IJF Grand Prix
Silver medal – second place	2013 Abu Dhabi	+78 kg
Mediterranean Games
Bronze medal – third place	2018 Tarragona	+78 kg
Islamic Solidarity Games
Silver medal – second place	2021 Konya	+78 kg
Bronze medal – third place	2017 Baku	+78 kg
World Juniors Championships
Bronze medal – third place	2010 Agadir	+78 kg
African Junior Championships
Gold medal – first place	2010 Dakar	+78 kg
Pan Arab Games
Gold medal – first place	2011 Doha	Open
Gold medal – first place	2023 Algiers	+78 kg
Gold medal – first place	2023 Algiers	Women's team
Silver medal – second place	2011 Doha	+78 kg

Profile at external databases
- IJF: 1249
- JudoInside.com: 54473
- Updated on 29 May 2022

Sonia Asselah (born 20 August 1991 in Tizi Ouzou) is an Algerian judoka. She competed at the 2012 Summer Olympics, but was eliminated in the first round by Karina Bryant of Britain. She qualified for the 2016 Summer Olympics and was the Algerian flag-bearer.

At the 2021 African Judo Championships held in Dakar, Senegal, Asselah won the silver medal in her event. She had also previously won the silver medal in the event in 2020.

Asselah competed at the 2020 Summer Olympics where she finished in 17th place after losing to Yelyzaveta Kalanina of Ukraine in the first round.

Olympic Games
Preceded by Abdelhafid Benchabla	Flagbearer for Algeria; 2016 Rio de Janeiro	Succeeded by Mohamed Flissi Amel Melih
