= 2025 African Judo Championships =

Judo competition

2025 Judo African Judo Championships
- Venue: Palais des Sports de Treichville
- Location: Abidjan, Ivory Coast
- Dates: 25–27 April 2025
- Competitors: 190 from 24 nations

Competition at external databases
- Links: IJF • JudoInside

The 2025 African Judo Championships are the 46th edition of the African Judo Championships and were held at the Palais des Sports de Treichville in Abidjan, Ivory Coast from 25 to 27 April 2025 as part of the IJF World Tour. The last day of competition featured a mixed team event.

== Medal summary ==
=== Men's events ===
Event	Gold	Silver	Bronze
Extra-lightweight (−60 kg)	Youssry Samy (EGY)	Leonardo Barros (ANG)	Ahmed Alaoui Cherifi (MAR)
Extra-lightweight (−60 kg)	Youssry Samy (EGY)	Leonardo Barros (ANG)	Fraj Dhouibi (TUN)
Half-lightweight (−66 kg)	Edmilson Pedro (ANG)	Mouhamedou Mboup (SEN)	Abderrahmane Boushita (MAR)
Half-lightweight (−66 kg)	Edmilson Pedro (ANG)	Mouhamedou Mboup (SEN)	Rachid Cherrad (ALG)
Lightweight (−73 kg)	Hassan Doukkali (MAR)	Alaeddine Ben Chalbi (TUN)	Ahmed Mehibel (ALG)
Lightweight (−73 kg)	Hassan Doukkali (MAR)	Alaeddine Ben Chalbi (TUN)	Messaoud Dris (ALG)
Half-middleweight (−81 kg)	Abdelrahman Abdelghany (EGY)	Valentin Houinato (BEN)	Timothy Meuwsen (RSA)
Half-middleweight (−81 kg)	Abdelrahman Abdelghany (EGY)	Valentin Houinato (BEN)	Namory Keita (SEN)
Middleweight (−90 kg)	Achraf Moutii (MAR)	Abdelaziz Ben Ammar (TUN)	Rémi Feuillet (MRI)
Middleweight (−90 kg)	Achraf Moutii (MAR)	Abdelaziz Ben Ammar (TUN)	Aly Abdelaal (EGY)
Half-heavyweight (−100 kg)	Abdalla Abdelsamea (EGY)	Omar Elramly (EGY)	Rayane Zakaria Benatia (ALG)
Half-heavyweight (−100 kg)	Abdalla Abdelsamea (EGY)	Omar Elramly (EGY)	Koussay Ben Ghares (TUN)
Heavyweight (+100 kg)	Mohamed Aborakia (EGY)	Mbagnick Ndiaye (SEN)	Mustapha Bouamar (ALG)
Heavyweight (+100 kg)	Mohamed Aborakia (EGY)	Mbagnick Ndiaye (SEN)	Piter da Silva (ANG)

=== Women's events ===
Event	Gold	Silver	Bronze
Extra-lightweight (−48 kg)	Oumaima Bedioui (TUN)	Houaria Kaddour (ALG)	Maria Segunda (ANG)
Extra-lightweight (−48 kg)	Oumaima Bedioui (TUN)	Houaria Kaddour (ALG)	Noura Salem (EGY)
Half-lightweight (−52 kg)	Soumiya Iraoui (MAR)	Faïza Aissahine (ALG)	Chaima Sidaoui (TUN)
Half-lightweight (−52 kg)	Soumiya Iraoui (MAR)	Faïza Aissahine (ALG)	Marie Céline Baba Matia (CMR)
Lightweight (−57 kg)	Mariana Esteves (GUI)	Andreza Antonio (ANG)	Khadidja Bekheira (ALG)
Lightweight (−57 kg)	Mariana Esteves (GUI)	Andreza Antonio (ANG)	Tassnim Roshdy (EGY)
Half-middleweight (−63 kg)	Jasmine Martin (RSA)	Chaimae Taibi (MAR)	Fatma Ghanem (EGY)
Half-middleweight (−63 kg)	Jasmine Martin (RSA)	Chaimae Taibi (MAR)	Amina Belkadi (ALG)
Middleweight (−70 kg)	Aina Laura Rasoanaivo Razafy (MAD)	Zita Ornella Biami (CMR)	Diassonema Mucungui (ANG)
Middleweight (−70 kg)	Aina Laura Rasoanaivo Razafy (MAD)	Zita Ornella Biami (CMR)	Wided Rajhid (TUN)
Half-heavyweight (−78 kg)	Marie Branser (GUI)	Arij Akkab (TUN)	Georgika Wesly Djengue Moune (CMR)
Half-heavyweight (−78 kg)	Marie Branser (GUI)	Arij Akkab (TUN)	Dyhia Benchallal (ALG)
Heavyweight (+78 kg)	Siwar Dhawedi (TUN)	Meroua Mammeri (ALG)	Sarra Mzougui (TUN)
Heavyweight (+78 kg)	Siwar Dhawedi (TUN)	Meroua Mammeri (ALG)	Crislayn Rodrigues (ANG)

=== Mixed events ===
Event	Gold	Silver	Bronze
Mixed team	Egypt	Algeria	Tunisia
Mixed team	Egypt	Algeria	Angola

Source results:

=== Medal table ===
* Host nation (Ivory Coast)

Rank	Nation	Gold	Silver	Bronze	Total
1	Egypt (EGY)	5	1	4	10
2	Morocco (MAR)	3	1	2	6
3	Tunisia (TUN)	2	3	6	11
4	Guinea (GUI)	2	0	0	2
5	Angola (ANG)	1	2	5	8
6	South Africa (RSA)	1	0	1	2
7	Madagascar (MAD)	1	0	0	1
8	Algeria (ALG)	0	4	8	12
9	Senegal (SEN)	0	2	1	3
10	Cameroon (CMR)	0	1	2	3
11	Benin (BEN)	0	1	0	1
12	Mauritius (MRI)	0	0	1	1
Totals (12 entries)		15	15	30	60
