= 2012 African Judo Championships =

Judo competition

2012 Judo African Judo Championships
- Venue: Agadir
- Location: Morocco
- Date: 2012
- Competitors: 192 from 31 nations

Competition at external databases
- Links: IJF • JudoInside

The 2012 African Judo Championships were the 33rd edition of the African Judo Championships, and were held in Agadir, Morocco from 4 April to 7 April 2012.

== Medal overview ==
=== Men ===
Event	Gold	Silver	Bronze
60 kg	(Morocco) Yassine Moudatir	(Tunisia) Fraj Dhouibi	(Algeria) Lyes Saker (South Africa) Lusanda Ngoma
66 kg	(Libya) Ahmed ElKawisah	(Tunisia) Houcem Khalfaoui	(Egypt) Ahmed Awad (Algeria) Youcef Nouari
73 kg	(Egypt) Hussein Hafiz	(South Africa) Gideon van Zyl	(Algeria) Larbi Grini (Libya) Mohamed Abdulnasr
81 kg	(Morocco) Safouane Attaf	(Algeria) Abderahmane Benamadi	(Egypt) Mohamed Darwish (Tunisia) Seifeddine Ben Hassen
90 kg	(Egypt) Hesham Mesbah	(Cameroon) Dieudonne Dolassem	(Algeria) Amar Benikhlef (Ivory Coast) Kinapeya Kone
100 kg	(Egypt) Ramadan Darwish	(Algeria) Lyes Bouyacoub	(Morocco) Adil Fikri (Cameroon) Franck Moussima
+100 kg	(Morocco) El Mehdi Malki	(Egypt) Islam El Shehaby	(Tunisia) Faycal Jaballah (Algeria) Mohamed Tayeb
Open class	(Tunisia) Faicel Jaballah	(Egypt) Mohamed Sayed Yousef	(Morocco) Jalal Benalla (Algeria) Bilal Zouani

=== Women ===
Event	Gold	Silver	Bronze
48 kg	(Tunisia) Hela Ayari	(Algeria) Sabrina Saidi	(Cameroon) Philomene Bata (Gabon) Sandrine Ilendou
52 kg	(Algeria) Soraya Haddad	(Tunisia) Amani Khalfaoui	(Morocco) Hanane Kerroumi (Ivory Coast) Zouleiha Abzetta Dabonne
57 kg	(Algeria) Ratiba Tariket	(Senegal) Hortense Diedhiou	(Ghana) Szandra Szögedi (Morocco) Fatima Zohra Ait Ali
63 kg	(Morocco) Rizlen Zouak	(Tunisia) Asma Bjaoui	(Burkina Faso) Séverine Nébié (Algeria) Kahina Saidi
70 kg	(Tunisia) Houda Miled	(Angola) Antonia Moreira	(Morocco) Asma Niang (Algeria) Aicha Benabderrahmene
78 kg	(Tunisia) Hana Mareghni	(Gabon) Audrey Koumba	(Algeria) Amina Temmar (Senegal) Georgette Sagna
+78 kg	(Algeria) Sonia Asselah	(Tunisia) Nihel Cheikh Rouhou	(Morocco) Rania El Kilali
Open class	(Morocco) Rania El Kilali	(Tunisia) Nihel Cheikh Rouhou	(Mauritius) Anabelle Laprovidence (Senegal) Monica Sagna

=== Medals table ===
Rank	Nation	Gold	Silver	Bronze	Total
1	Morocco	5	0	6	11
2	Tunisia	4	6	2	12
3	Algeria	3	3	9	15
4	Egypt	3	2	2	7
5	Libya	1	0	1	2
6	Cameroon	0	1	2	3
6	Senegal	0	1	2	3
8	Gabon	0	1	1	2
8	South Africa	0	1	1	2
10	Angola	0	1	0	1
11	Ivory Coast	0	0	2	2
12	Burkina Faso	0	0	1	1
12	Ghana	0	0	1	1
12	Mauritius	0	0	1	1
Totals (14 entries)		16	16	31	63
