= Sarra Mzougui =

Tunisian judoka (born 1994)

Personal information
- Native name: سارة مزوغي
- Nationality: Tunisian
- Born: 8 March 1994 (age 32) Erice, Italy
- Occupation: Judoka

Sport
- Country: Tunisia
- Sport: Judo
- Weight class: ‍–‍78 kg, +78 kg

Achievements and titles
- Olympic Games: R32 (2024)
- World Champ.: R16 (2023, 2024)
- African Champ.: (gold) (2022, 2023)
Medal record
Women's judo
Representing Tunisia
African Games
| Gold medal – first place | 2023 Accra | Mixed team |
| Silver medal – second place | 2015 Brazzaville | ‍–‍78 kg |
| Silver medal – second place | 2023 Accra | +78 kg |
| Bronze medal – third place | 2019 Rabat | ‍–‍78 kg |
African Championships
| Gold medal – first place | 2022 Oran | +78 kg |
| Gold medal – first place | 2023 Casablanca | +78 kg |
| Silver medal – second place | 2016 Tunis | ‍–‍78 kg |
| Silver medal – second place | 2017 Antananarivo | ‍–‍78 kg |
| Silver medal – second place | 2018 Tunis | ‍–‍78 kg |
| Bronze medal – third place | 2014 Port Louis | ‍–‍78 kg |
| Bronze medal – third place | 2015 Libreville | ‍–‍78 kg |
| Bronze medal – third place | 2019 Cape Town | ‍–‍78 kg |
| Bronze medal – third place | 2021 Dakar | ‍–‍78 kg |
| Bronze medal – third place | 2024 Cairo | +78 kg |
| Bronze medal – third place | 2025 Abidjan | +78 kg |
Islamic Solidarity Games
| Gold medal – first place | 2017 Baku | ‍–‍78 kg |
| Bronze medal – third place | 2021 Konya | +78 kg |
World Juniors Championships
| Gold medal – first place | 2014 Fort Lauderdale | ‍–‍78 kg |
African Junior Championships
| Gold medal – first place | 2010 Dakar | ‍–‍78 kg |
| Gold medal – first place | 2011 Antananarivo | ‍–‍78 kg |
| Gold medal – first place | 2012 Gaborone | ‍–‍78 kg |
| Gold medal – first place | 2013 Algiers | ‍–‍78 kg |
| Gold medal – first place | 2014 Tunis | ‍–‍78 kg |
Jeux de la Francophonie
| Silver medal – second place | 2013 Nice | ‍–‍78 kg |
| Bronze medal – third place | 2017 Abidjan | ‍–‍78 kg |
Arab Games
| Silver medal – second place | 2023 Algiers | Women's team |

Profile at external databases
- IJF: 2520
- JudoInside.com: 49441
- Updated on 27 April 2025

Sarra Mzougui (Arabic: سارة مزوغي; born 8 March 1994) is a Tunisian judoka. She won the gold medal in her event at the 2022 African Judo Championships held in Oran, Algeria. She is also a four-time medalist, including the 2023 gold medalist, at the African Games.

Mzougui won one of the bronze medals in the women's 78 kg event at the 2019 African Judo Championships held in Cape Town, South Africa.

At the 2021 African Judo Championships held in Dakar, Senegal, Mzougui won one of the bronze medals in her event.

== Achievements ==
| Year | Tournament | Place | Weight class |
|---|---|---|---|
| 2015 | African Games | 2nd | 78 kg |
| 2019 | African Games | 3rd | 78 kg |
| 2024 | African Games | 2nd | +78 kg |
