= Lyès Bouyacoub =

Algerian judoka (born 1983)

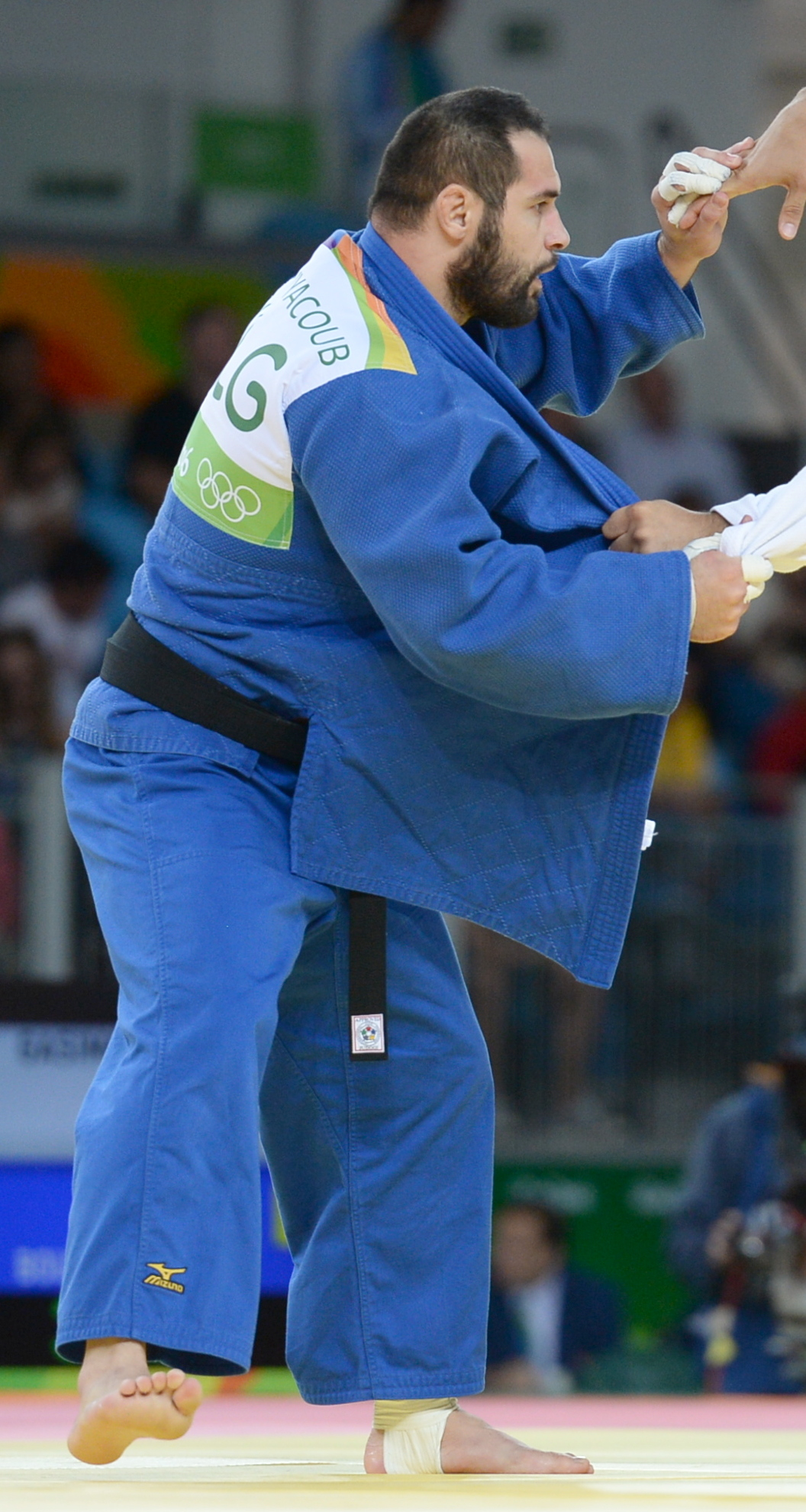
- Bouyacoub at the 2016 Olympics

Personal information
- Born: 3 April 1983 (age 43)
- Occupation: Judoka
- Height: 185 cm (6 ft 1 in)

Sport
- Country: Algeria
- Sport: Judo
- Weight class: –90 kg, –100 kg
- Coached by: Samir Sebba

Achievements and titles
- Olympic Games: R16 (2016)
- World Champ.: R32 (2009, 2011, 2015, 2017)
- African Champ.: (gold) (2014, 2015, 2017, 2019)
Medal record
Men's judo
Representing Algeria
African Games
Gold medal – first place	2015 Brazzaville	–100 kg
Silver medal – second place	2011 Maputo	–90 kg
African Championships
Gold medal – first place	2014 Port Louis	–100 kg
Gold medal – first place	2015 Libreville	–100 kg
Gold medal – first place	2017 Antananarivo	–100 kg
Gold medal – first place	2019 Cape Town	–100 kg
Silver medal – second place	2012 Agadir	–100 kg
Silver medal – second place	2013 Maputo	–100 kg
Silver medal – second place	2016 Tunis	–100 kg
Silver medal – second place	2018 Tunis	–100 kg
Bronze medal – third place	2009 Mauritius	–90 kg
Bronze medal – third place	2010 Yaounde	Open
IJF Grand Slam
Bronze medal – third place	2014 Abu Dhabi	–100 kg
IJF Grand Prix
Bronze medal – third place	2010 Abu Dhabi	–90 kg

Profile at external databases
- IJF: 17878
- JudoInside.com: 27288
- Updated on 23 November 2022

Lyès Bouyacoub (born 3 April 1983) is an Algerian judoka who won the African Championships in 2014 and 2015, placing second in 2013 and 2016. He competed at the 2016 Olympics, but was eliminated in the third round.
