= Taciana Cesar =

Bissau-Guinean judoka (born 1988)

Personal information
- Nationality: Brazilian; Bissau-Guinean
- Born: 12 December 1988 (age 37) Olinda, Brazil
- Occupation: Judoka

Sport
- Country: Brazil (until 2012); Guinea-Bissau (since 2013)
- Sport: Judo
- Weight class: –48 kg, –52 kg
Medal record
Women's judo
Representing Brazil
Pan American Judo Championships
Bronze medal – third place	2011 Guadalajara	–48 kg
IJF Grand Prix
Bronze medal – third place	2012 Abu Dhabi	–48 kg
World Juniors Championships
Bronze medal – third place	2002 Jeju	–48 kg
Pan American Junior Championships
Gold medal – first place	2001 Acapulco	–44 kg
Representing Guinea-Bissau
African Judo Championships
Gold medal – first place	2013 Maputo	–48 kg
Gold medal – first place	2014 Port-Louis	–48 kg
Gold medal – first place	2015 Libreville	–48 kg
Gold medal – first place	2016 Tunis	–48 kg
Gold medal – first place	2017 Antananarivo	–48 kg
Gold medal – first place	2019 Cape Town	–52 kg
Gold medal – first place	2020 Antananarivo	–52 kg
IJF Grand Slam
Bronze medal – third place	2014 Tyumen	–48 kg
Bronze medal – third place	2014 Abu Dhabi	–48 kg
IJF Grand Prix
Silver medal – second place	2016 Tbilisi	–48 kg
Bronze medal – third place	2014 Samsun	–48 kg
Bronze medal – third place	2014 Zagreb	–48 kg
Bronze medal – third place	2015 Samsun	–48 kg
Bronze medal – third place	2015 Budapest	–48 kg
Bronze medal – third place	2016 Budapest	–48 kg
Bronze medal – third place	2017 The Hague	–48 kg

Profile at external databases
- IJF: 12695, 2535
- JudoInside.com: 10003
- Updated on 16 February 2022

Taciana Rezende de Cesar Baldé (née Lima) (born 12 December 1988) is a judoka. Born in Brazil to a Bissau-Guinean father, she represented her country of birth before pledging her international allegiance to Guinea-Bissau. She competed at the 2016 Summer Olympics in the women's 48 kg event, in which she was eliminated in the second round by Galbadrakhyn Otgontsetseg She was the flag bearer for Guinea-Bissau during the closing ceremony.

In 2019, she competed in the women's 52 kg event at the 2019 World Judo Championships held in Tokyo, Japan.

She competed in the women's 52 kg event at the 2020 Summer Olympics.

Olympic Games
Preceded by Augusto Midana	Flag bearer for Guinea-Bissau; Tokyo 2020 with Augusto Midana	Succeeded by Diamantino Iuna Fafé
