= Sofia Belattar =

Moroccan judoka (born 1995)

Personal information
- Born: 9 February 1995 (age 31)
- Occupation: Judoka

Sport
- Country: Morocco
- Sport: Judo
- Weight class: ‍–‍63 kg, ‍–‍70 kg

Achievements and titles
- World Champ.: R32 (2017)
- African Champ.: (gold) (2017)
Medal record
Women's judo
Representing Morocco
African Games
Bronze medal – third place	2019 Rabat	‍–‍63 kg
African Championships
Gold medal – first place	2017 Antananarivo	‍–‍63 kg
Silver medal – second place	2018 Tunis	‍–‍63 kg
Silver medal – second place	2019 Cape Town	‍–‍63 kg
Silver medal – second place	2020 Antananarivo	‍–‍63 kg
Bronze medal – third place	2024 Cairo	‍–‍70 kg
African Junior Championships
Gold medal – first place	2012 Gaborone	‍–‍63 kg
Silver medal – second place	2010 Dakar	‍–‍57 kg
Silver medal – second place	2013 Algiers	‍–‍63 kg
Bronze medal – third place	2014 Tunis	‍–‍63 kg
Bronze medal – third place	2015 Sharm El Sheikh	‍–‍63 kg
Jeux de la Francophonie
Bronze medal – third place	2017 Abidjan	‍–‍63 kg

Profile at external databases
- IJF: 3839
- JudoInside.com: 78782
- Updated on 2 May 2024

Sofia Belattar (born 9 February 1995) is a Moroccan judoka.

Belattar won the silver medal in the women's 63 kg event at the 2019 African Judo Championships held in Cape Town, South Africa. She also won the silver medal in that event at the 2020 African Judo Championships held in Antananarivo, Madagascar.

== Achievements ==
Year	Tournament	Place	Weight class
2017	African Judo Championships	1st	−63 kg
2019	African Games	3rd	−63 kg
