= Yassine Moudatir =

Moroccan judoka (born 1988)

Yassine Moudatir (born 29 July 1988, Al Fida) is a Moroccan judoka who competes in the men's 60 kg category. At the 2012 Summer Olympics, he was defeated in the second round by Valtteri Jokinen.

He won the African Championships in his division in 2010, 2012, 2013 and 2015. He also won the bronze in 2014.
