= 2021 African Judo Championships =

Judo competition

- Venue: Dakar Arena
- Location: Dakar, Senegal
- Dates: 20–22 May 2021
- Competitors: 210 from 40 nations

The 2021 African Judo Championships took place in Dakar, Senegal, from 20 to 22 May 2021.

== Medal summary ==
=== Men's events ===
| Event | Gold | Silver | Bronze |
|---|---|---|---|
| Extra-lightweight (–60 kg) | Issam Bassou; Morocco | Youssry Samy; Egypt | Mohamed Rebahi; Algeria |
| Extra-lightweight (–60 kg) | Issam Bassou; Morocco | Youssry Samy; Egypt | Younes Saddiki; Morocco |
| Half-lightweight (–66 kg) | Ahmed Abelrahman; Egypt | Wail Ezzine; Algeria | Abderrahmane Boushita; Morocco |
| Half-lightweight (–66 kg) | Ahmed Abelrahman; Egypt | Wail Ezzine; Algeria | Kevin Loforte; Mozambique |
| Lightweight (–73 kg) | Fethi Nourine; Algeria | Faye Njie; Gambia | Ali Abdelmouaty; Egypt |
| Lightweight (–73 kg) | Fethi Nourine; Algeria | Faye Njie; Gambia | Hamza Oerghi; Tunisia |
| Half-middleweight (–81 kg) | Achraf Moutii; Morocco | Hachem Sellami; Tunisia | Mohamed Abdelaal; Egypt |
| Half-middleweight (–81 kg) | Achraf Moutii; Morocco | Hachem Sellami; Tunisia | Saliou Ndiaye; Senegal |
| Middleweight (–90 kg) | Abderrahmane Benamadi; Algeria | Kwadjo Anani; Ghana | Abdelaziz Ben Ammar; Tunisia |
| Middleweight (–90 kg) | Abderrahmane Benamadi; Algeria | Kwadjo Anani; Ghana | Rémi Feuillet; Mauritius |
| Half-heavyweight (–100 kg) | Mustapha Bouamar; Algeria | Koussay Ben Ghares; Tunisia | Koffi Krémé Kobena; Ivory Coast |
| Half-heavyweight (–100 kg) | Mustapha Bouamar; Algeria | Koussay Ben Ghares; Tunisia | Mohammed Lahboub; Morocco |
| Heavyweight (+100 kg) | Faïcel Jaballah; Tunisia | Mohamed Sofiane Belrekaa; Algeria | Anis Ben Khaled; Tunisia |
| Heavyweight (+100 kg) | Faïcel Jaballah; Tunisia | Mohamed Sofiane Belrekaa; Algeria | Mbagnick Ndiaye; Senegal |

=== Women's events ===
| Event | Gold | Silver | Bronze |
|---|---|---|---|
| Extra-lightweight (–48 kg) | Oumaima Bedioui; Tunisia | Priscilla Morand; Mauritius | Chaimae Eddinari; Morocco |
| Extra-lightweight (–48 kg) | Oumaima Bedioui; Tunisia | Priscilla Morand; Mauritius | Rania Harbaoui; Tunisia |
| Half-lightweight (–52 kg) | Soumiya Iraoui; Morocco | Salimata Fofana; Ivory Coast | Charne Griesel; South Africa |
| Half-lightweight (–52 kg) | Soumiya Iraoui; Morocco | Salimata Fofana; Ivory Coast | Djamila Silva; Cape Verde |
| Lightweight (–57 kg) | Ghofran Khelifi; Tunisia | Donne Breytenbach; South Africa | Zouleiha Abzetta Dabonne; Ivory Coast |
| Lightweight (–57 kg) | Ghofran Khelifi; Tunisia | Donne Breytenbach; South Africa | Yamina Halata; Algeria |
| Half-middleweight (–63 kg) | Sarah Harachi; Morocco | Sandrine Billiet; Cape Verde | Amina Belkadi; Algeria |
| Half-middleweight (–63 kg) | Sarah Harachi; Morocco | Sandrine Billiet; Cape Verde | Meriem Bjaoui; Tunisia |
| Middleweight (–70 kg) | Nihel Bouchoucha; Tunisia | Mariem Khelifi; Tunisia | Fatou Kine Badji; Senegal |
| Middleweight (–70 kg) | Nihel Bouchoucha; Tunisia | Mariem Khelifi; Tunisia | Souad Bellakehal; Algeria |
| Half-heavyweight (–78 kg) | Marie Branser; DR Congo | Hafsa Yatim; Morocco | Sarra Mzougui; Tunisia |
| Half-heavyweight (–78 kg) | Marie Branser; DR Congo | Hafsa Yatim; Morocco | Kaouthar Ouallal; Algeria |
| Heavyweight (+78 kg) | Nihel Cheikh Rouhou; Tunisia | Sonia Asselah; Algeria | Meroua Mammeri; Algeria |
| Heavyweight (+78 kg) | Nihel Cheikh Rouhou; Tunisia | Sonia Asselah; Algeria | Monica Sagna; Senegal |

=== Medal table ===
* Host nation (Senegal)

| Rank | Nation | Gold | Silver | Bronze | Total |
|---|---|---|---|---|---|
| 1 | Tunisia | 5 | 3 | 6 | 14 |
| 2 | Morocco | 4 | 1 | 4 | 9 |
| 3 | Algeria | 3 | 3 | 6 | 12 |
| 4 | Egypt | 1 | 1 | 2 | 4 |
| 5 | DR Congo | 1 | 0 | 0 | 1 |
| 6 | Ivory Coast | 0 | 1 | 2 | 3 |
| 7 | Cape Verde | 0 | 1 | 1 | 2 |
| 7 | Mauritius | 0 | 1 | 1 | 2 |
| 7 | South Africa | 0 | 1 | 1 | 2 |
| 10 | Gambia | 0 | 1 | 0 | 1 |
| 10 | Ghana | 0 | 1 | 0 | 1 |
| 12 | Senegal* | 0 | 0 | 4 | 4 |
| 13 | Mozambique | 0 | 0 | 1 | 1 |
| Totals (13 entries) | | 14 | 14 | 28 | 56 |
