= Houd Zourdani =

Algerian judoka (born 1993)

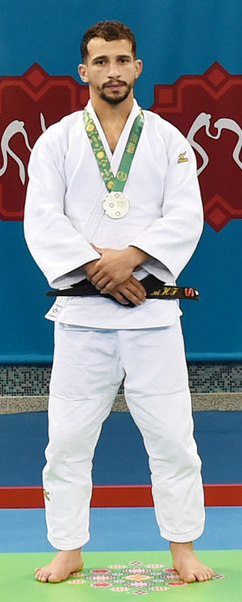

Personal information
- Native name: هود زورداني
- Nationality: Algerian
- Born: 17 October 1993 (age 32)
- Occupation: Judoka

Sport
- Country: Algeria
- Sport: Judo
- Weight class: –66 kg \ –73 kg

Achievements and titles
- Olympic Games: R16 (2016)
- World Champ.: R32 (2013, 2014)
- African Champ.: (gold) (2015, 2017)
Medal record
Men's judo
Representing Algeria
African Games
Gold medal – first place	2015 Brazzaville	–66 kg
African Championships
Gold medal – first place	2015 Libreville	–66 kg
Gold medal – first place	2017 Antananarivo	–66 kg
Silver medal – second place	2022 Oran	–73 kg
Bronze medal – third place	2013 Maputo	–66 kg
Bronze medal – third place	2014 Port Louis	–66 kg
Bronze medal – third place	2016 Tunis	–66 kg
Bronze medal – third place	2018 Tunis	–66 kg
African Junior Championships
Silver medal – second place	2013 Algiers	–66 kg

Profile at external databases
- IJF: 12564
- JudoInside.com: 58375
- Updated on 29 May 2022

Houd Zourdani (born 17 October 1993) is an Algerian judoka.

He won a gold medal at the 2015 African Judo Championships. He competed at the 2016 Summer Olympics in Rio de Janeiro, in the men's 66 kg.
