= Salim Rabahi =

Algerian judoka (born 1996)

Salim Rabahi (born 27 January 1996) is an Algerian, male Judo player, who has played in both local and international championships in Dakar, Yaounde, and South Africa. He weighs 60kg. Algeria was tagged the most successful nation for African Judo Championships in 2022.

== Career ==
Salim played in the Algerian National Club and represented his country in different tournaments. He participated in Dakar African Open 2019 on 16 November 2019, the 12th African Games 2019 on 17 August 2019, African Championships Seniors 2019 on 25 April 2019, and the Yaounde African Open 2018 on 24 November 2018. At the African Judo Championships that took place in Cape Town, South Africa, 28 Mediterranean countries were represented where Algeria, alongside Tunisia and Egypt won the top three positions. Algeria won four gold, four silver, and five bronze medals. Salim Rabahi was one of the members of the team who won a medal too.

== Achievement ==
Salim Rabahi won a bronze medal in 2019 at the African Championships in Cape Town. He also won a bronze medal in 2019 at the African Games in Rabat and a gold medal at the African Open in Dakar, also in 2019. He played at the European Championship, World Cups/Continental Open, and Continental Championships where he won medals.
