= Asaramanitra Ratiarison =

Malagasy judoka

Personal information
- Nationality: Malagasy
- Born: 7 January 1988 (age 37)
- Occupation: Judoka
- Height: 155 cm (5 ft 1 in)
- Weight: 48 kg (106 lb)

Sport
- Sport: Judo

Profile at external databases
- JudoInside.com: 39201

Asaramanitra Ratiarison (born 7 January 1988) is a Malagasy judoka.

She competed at the 2016 Summer Olympics in Rio de Janeiro, in the women's 48 kg. She was defeated by Dayaris Mestre Alvarez of Cuba in the first round. She was the flag bearer for Madagascar during the closing ceremony.
