= Imene Agouar =

Algerian judoka

Personal information
- Born: 22 November 1993 (age 32)

Sport
- Country: Algeria
- Sport: Judo
- Weight class: 63 kg
Medal record
Women's judo
Representing Algeria
African Championships
Gold medal – first place	2014 Chad	−63 kg
African Judo Championships
Silver medal – second place	2018 Dakar	−63 kg
Bronze medal – third place	2018 Tunisia	−63 kg African Championships - Results Women 2018

Imene Agouar (born 22 November 1993) is an Algerian judoka who competes internationally for Algeria. Her last victory was in the African Championships 2014 in women's half middleweight 63 kg.

== Achievement ==
Agouar won silver at the African Championships in 2015 after winning the title in 2014. In 2013, she won silver again. At the Grand Prix of Zagreb in 2014, she was close to winning the bronze medal but ultimately was unsuccessful. She has won one gold medal in the continental cup, three silver medals in the continental championships and two in the continental open and also two bronze medal in the continental championships.
