= Dieudonne Dolassem =

Cameroonian judoka (born 1979)

Personal information
- Nationality: Cameroonian
- Born: 4 September 1979 (age 46)
- Occupation: Judoka

Sport
- Sport: Judo
- Weight class: -90 kg
Medal record
Men's judo
Representing Cameroon
African Games
Bronze medal – third place	2019 Rabat	–90 kg

Profile at external databases
- IJF: 4294
- JudoInside.com: 39905

Dieudonne Dolassem (born 4 September 1979) is a Cameroonian judoka. He competed at the 2012 Summer Olympics in the -90 kg event and lost in the first round to Varlam Liparteliani.
