= Weightlifting at the 1991 Mediterranean Games =

Wrestling competition

- Dates: June–July 1991
- Competitors: 64 from 12 nations

The weightlifting tournament at the 1991 Mediterranean Games was held in Athens, Greece.

== Medal table ==
* Host nation (Greece)

Rank	Nation	Gold	Silver	Bronze	Total
1	Turkey	11	4	3	18
2	Spain	5	8	0	13
3	Italy	5	2	0	7
4	Egypt	4	2	11	17
5	France	2	3	8	13
6	Greece*	1	4	3	8
7	Algeria	1	2	2	5
8	Lebanon	1	1	1	3
9	Albania	0	3	1	4
10	Syria	0	1	1	2
Totals (10 entries)		30	30	30	90

== Medal summary ==
=== Men's events ===
Event		Gold		Silver		Bronze	
52 kg	Snatch	Halil Mutlu (TUR)	107.5 kg	José Andrés Ibáñez (ESP)	100 kg	Ramdan Younes (EGY)	100 kg
52 kg	Clean & Jerk	Halil Mutlu (TUR)	135 kg	José Andrés Ibáñez (ESP)	125 kg	Ramdan Younes (EGY)	122.5 kg
52 kg	Total	Halil Mutlu (TUR)	242.5 kg	José Andrés Ibáñez (ESP)	225 kg	Ramdan Younes (EGY)	222.5 kg
56 kg	Snatch	José Zurera (ESP)	110 kg	Pascal Arnou (FRA)	107.5 kg	José Martinez (FRA)	102.5 kg
56 kg	Clean & Jerk	Pascal Arnou (FRA)	140 kg	José Zurera (ESP)	132.5 kg	José Martinez (FRA)	125 kg
56 kg	Total	Pascal Arnou (FRA)	247.5 kg	José Zurera (ESP)	242.5 kg	José Martinez (FRA)	227.5 kg
60 kg	Snatch	Naim Süleymanoğlu (TUR)	125 kg	Cecilio Leal (ESP)	115 kg	Lionel Gondran (FRA)	115 kg
60 kg	Clean & Jerk	Naim Süleymanoğlu (TUR)	160 kg	Cecilio Leal (ESP)	150 kg	Azzedine Barbas (ALG)	150 kg
60 kg	Total	Naim Süleymanoğlu (TUR)	285 kg	Cecilio Leal (ESP)	265 kg	Charalambos Klartsidis (GRE)	260 kg
67.5 kg	Snatch	Abdel Monaim Yahiaoui (ALG)	135 kg	Fedail Güler (TUR)	135 kg	Ergün Batmaz (TUR)	135 kg
67.5 kg	Clean & Jerk	Fedail Güler (TUR)	172.5 kg	Fatmir Bushi (ALB)	167.5 kg	Abdel Monaim Yahiaoui (ALG)	165 kg
67.5 kg	Total	Fedail Güler (TUR)	307.5 kg	Abdel Monaim Yahiaoui (ALG)	300 kg	Fatmir Bushi (ALB)	297.5 kg
75 kg	Snatch	Muharrem Süleymanoğlu (TUR)	142.5 kg	Ayhan Aksu (TUR)	140 kg	Christos Constandinidis (GRE)	137.5 kg
75 kg	Clean & Jerk	Ayhan Aksu (TUR)	177.5 kg	Basiony Hamdy (EGY)	175 kg	Muharrem Süleymanoğlu (TUR)	172.5 kg
75 kg	Total	Ayhan Aksu (TUR)	317.5 kg	Muharrem Süleymanoğlu (TUR)	315 kg	Basiony Hamdy (EGY)	310 kg
82.5 kg	Snatch	Juan Carlos (ESP)	147.5 kg	Raffaele Mancino (ITA)	147.5 kg	Cédric Plançon (FRA)	145 kg
82.5 kg	Clean & Jerk	Juan Carlos (ESP)	187.5 kg	Cédric Plançon (FRA)	185 kg	Stéphane Sageder (FRA)	182.5 kg
82.5 kg	Total	Juan Carlos (ESP)	335 kg	Cédric Plançon (FRA)	330 kg	Stéphane Sageder (FRA)	320 kg
90 kg	Snatch	Hassan El-Kaissi (LIB)	152.5 kg	Talat Ünlü (TUR)	152.5 kg	Sarwat Bendary (EGY)	150 kg
90 kg	Clean & Jerk	Sarwat Bendary (EGY)	192.5 kg	Khaled Hassan (EGY)	192.5 kg	Hassan El-Kaissi (LIB)	190 kg
90 kg	Total	Sarwat Bendary (EGY)	342.5 kg	Hassan El-Kaissi (LIB)	342.5 kg	Talat Ünlü (TUR)	342.5 kg
100 kg	Snatch	Said Sharaf (EGY)	170 kg	Panagiotis Drakopoulos (GRE)	155 kg	Gérald Roland (FRA)	152.5 kg
100 kg	Clean & Jerk	Said Sharaf (EGY)	210 kg	Cheikh Hassanin (SYR)	190 kg	Panagiotis Drakopoulos (GRE)	187.5 kg
100 kg	Total	Said Sharaf (EGY)	380 kg	Panagiotis Drakopoulos (GRE)	342.5 kg	Cheikh Hassanin (SYR)	335 kg
110 kg	Snatch	Norberto Oberburger (ITA)	167.5 kg	Dede Dekaz (ALB)	150 kg	Ibrahim El-Bakh (EGY)	150 kg
110 kg	Clean & Jerk	Norberto Oberburger (ITA)	195 kg	Dede Dekaz (ALB)	205 kg	Ibrahim El-Bakh (EGY)	195 kg
110 kg	Total	Norberto Oberburger (ITA)	362.5 kg	Dede Dekaz (ALB)	355 kg	Ibrahim El-Bakh (EGY)	345 kg
+110 kg	Snatch	Yannis Tsinsarisn (GRE)	162.5 kg	Vanni Lauzana (ITA)	160 kg	Reda Elbatoty (EGY)	160 kg
+110 kg	Clean & Jerk	Vanni Lauzana (ITA)	207.5 kg	Yannis Tsinsarisn (GRE)	190 kg	Reda Elbatoty (EGY)	182.5 kg
+110 kg	Total	Vanni Lauzana (ITA)	367.5 kg	Yannis Tsinsarisn (GRE)	352.5 kg	Reda Elbatoty (EGY)	342.5 kg
