= Algeria at the 1997 Mediterranean Games =

- IOC code: ALG
- NOC: Algerian Olympic Committee

in Bari
- Competitors: 135
- Medals Ranked 6th: Gold 6 Silver 8 Bronze 8 Total 22

Mediterranean Games appearances (overview)
- 1967; 1971; 1975; 1979; 1983; 1987; 1991; 1993; 1997; 2001; 2005; 2009; 2013; 2018; 2022

Algeria (ALG) competed at the 1997 Mediterranean Games in Bari, Italy.

== Medal summary ==
=== Medal table ===
| Medal silver | Name nourdinne talhaoui | Sport wrestling | Event 75 kg | Date june |
|---|---|---|---|---|
| Gold | Samir-Adel Louahla; Kamel Talhaoui; Ahmed Aichaoui; Malik Louahla | Athletics | Men's 4×400 metres relay | June |
| Gold | Azzedine Sakhri | Athletics | Men's Marathon | June |
| Gold | Nouria Mérah-Benida | Athletics | Women's 1500 metres | June |
| Gold | Mohamed Allalou | Boxing | Men's Featherweight | 19 June |
| Gold | Reda Benkaddour | Karate | Men's 65 kg | June |
| Gold | Salim Iles | Swimming | Men's 100m freestyle | June |
| Silver | Mehdi Assous | Boxing | Men's Flyweight | 19 June |
| Silver | Noureddine Madjhoud | Boxing | Men's Bantamweight | 19 June |
| Silver | Mohamed Benguesmia | Boxing | Men's Heavyweight | 19 June |
| Silver | Amar Meridja | Judo | Men's 65 kg | June |
| Silver | Salima Souakri | Judo | Women's 52 kg | June |
| Silver | Sid Ali Ferdjani | Artistic gymnastics | Men's pommel horse | June |
| Silver | Abdel Monaim Yahiaoui | Weightlifting | Men's Clean & Jerk 70 kg | June |
| Silver | Salim Iles | Swimming | Men's 50m freestyle | June |
| Bronze | Samir-Adel Louahla | Athletics | Men's 400 metres | June |
| Bronze | Djabir Saïd-Guerni | Athletics | Men's 800 metres | June |
| Bronze | Kamel Kohil | Athletics | Men's 10,000 metres | June |
| Bronze | Abdelaziz Boulahia | Boxing | Men's Lightweight | 18 June |
| Bronze | Lynda Mekzine | Judo | Women's 56 kg | June |
| Bronze | Abdel Monaim Yahiaoui | Weightlifting | Men's Snatch 70 kg | June |
| Bronze | Ali Benterki | Karate | Men's 60 kg | June |
| Bronze | Mohamed Amine Benhamadi | Wrestling | Men's Freestyle 58 kg | June |

Medals by sport
| Sport | 1st place, gold medalist(s) | 2nd place, silver medalist(s) | 3rd place, bronze medalist(s) | Total |
| Athletics | 3 | 0 | 3 | 6 |
| Boxing | 1 | 3 | 1 | 5 |
| Gymnastics | 0 | 1 | 0 | 1 |
| Judo | 0 | 2 | 1 | 3 |
| Karate | 1 | 0 | 1 | 2 |
| Swimming | 1 | 1 | 0 | 2 |
| Weightlifting | 0 | 1 | 1 | 2 |
| Wrestling | 0 | 0 | 1 | 1 |
| Total | 6 | 8 | 8 | 22 |

Medals by gender
| Gender | 1st place, gold medalist(s) | 2nd place, silver medalist(s) | 3rd place, bronze medalist(s) | Total |
| Male | 5 | 7 | 7 | 19 |
| Female | 1 | 1 | 1 | 3 |
| Total | 6 | 8 | 8 | 22 |
