= Weightlifting at the 1992 Summer Olympics – Men's +110 kg =

Competition in the weightlifting event at the 1992 Summer Olympics

Men's +110 kg at the Games of the XXV Olympiad
- Venue: Pavelló de l'Espanya Industrial
- Date: 4 August 1992
- Competitors: 20 from 16 nations
- Winning total: 450 kg

Medalists
1st place, gold medalist(s)		Aleksandr Kurlovich	Unified Team
2nd place, silver medalist(s)		Leonid Taranenko	Unified Team
3rd place, bronze medalist(s)		Manfred Nerlinger	Germany

The Men's Super heavyweight Weightlifting Event (+110 kg) is the heaviest men's event at the weightlifting competition. It was open to any competitors who had at least 110.0 kilograms of body mass. The maximum weight was unlimited. The competition took place on 4 August in the Pavelló de l'Espanya Industrial.

Each lifter performed in both the snatch and clean and jerk lifts, with the final score being the sum of the lifter's best result in each. The athlete received three attempts in each of the two lifts; the score for the lift was the heaviest weight successfully lifted. Ties were broken by the lifter with the lightest body weight.

== Results ==
Rank	Name	Body Weight	Snatch (kg)			Clean & Jerk (kg)			Total (kg)
Rank	Name	Body Weight	1	2	3	1	2	3	Total (kg)
1st place, gold medalist(s)	Alexander Kurlovitch (EUN)	131.05	195.0	200.0	205.0	237.5	245.0	~~250.0~~	450.0
2nd place, silver medalist(s)	Leonid Taranenko (EUN)	144.10	~~187.5~~	187.5	-	232.5	237.5	~~242.5~~	425.0
3rd place, bronze medalist(s)	Manfred Nerlinger (GER)	149.75	180.0	~~185.0~~	~~185.0~~	232.5	~~242.5~~	~~247.5~~	412.5
4	Ernesto Aguero (CUB)	163.35	175.0	182.5	~~187.5~~	230.0	~~240.0~~	~~240.0~~	412.5
5	Mitko Mitev (BUL)	127.35	180.0	~~185.0~~	~~185.0~~	220.0	~~225.0~~	~~225.0~~	400.0
6	Jiří Zubrický (TCH)	156.50	~~172.5~~	170.0	~~177.5~~	222.5	~~227.5~~	~~232.5~~	392.5
7	Erdinç Aslan (TUR)	128.30	170.0	~~175.0~~	~~175.0~~	220.0	~~225.0~~	~~225.0~~	390.0
8	Mario Martinez (USA)	141.45	170.0	~~175.0~~	~~175.0~~	210.0	~~215.0~~	215.0	385.0
9	Martin Zawieja (GER)	128.35	170.0	~~175.0~~	~~175.0~~	210.0	~~215.0~~	~~215.0~~	380.0
10	Mark Henry (USA)	166.40	~~165.0~~	165.0	~~170.0~~	~~202.5~~	202.5	212.5	377.5
11	Steve Kettner (AUS)	131.95	~~165.0~~	170.0	~~175.0~~	200.0	205.0	~~210.0~~	375.0
12	Vanni Lauzana (ITA)	118.50	155.0	160.0	~~165.0~~	200.0	~~210.0~~	210.0	370.0
13	Anders T Bergström (SWE)	124.00	160.0	165.0	~~170.0~~	200.0	~~210.0~~	~~210.0~~	365.0
14	Raimonds Bergmanis (LAT)	118.40	~~162.5~~	162.5	~~167.5~~	200.0	~~205.0~~	~~207.5~~	362.5
15	Reda El-Batoty (EGY)	120.85	160.0	~~170.0~~	~~170.0~~	200.0	~~207.5~~	~~207.5~~	360.0
16	Rickard Nilsson (SWE)	111.90	~~165.0~~	~~165.0~~	165.0	185.0	~~200.0~~	~~200.0~~	350.0
17	Rolando Marchinares (PER)	133.25	147.5	152.5	~~155.0~~	187.5	192.5	195.0	347.5
18	Mustafa Ahshad (LBA)	112.85	130.0	135.0	140.0	160.0	165.0	170.0	305.0
19	Gilbert Ojadi Aduche (NGR)	126.40	~~180.0~~	180.0	~~190.0~~	~~220.0~~	~~220.0~~	-	DNF
20	Kim Tae-Hyeon (KOR)	126.45	~~180.0~~	~~180.0~~	~~180.0~~	-	-	-	DNF
