= Algeria at the 2001 Mediterranean Games =

- IOC code: ALG
- NOC: Algerian Olympic Committee

in Tunis
- Competitors: 155
- Medals Ranked 7th: Gold 10 Silver 10 Bronze 12 Total 32

Mediterranean Games appearances (overview)
- 1967; 1971; 1975; 1979; 1983; 1987; 1991; 1993; 1997; 2001; 2005; 2009; 2013; 2018; 2022; 2026

Algeria (ALG) competed at the 2001 Mediterranean Games in Tunis, Tunisia.

== Medal summary ==
=== Medal table ===
Medal	Name	Sport	Event	Date
Gold	Salima Souakri	Judo	Women's 52 kg	September
Gold	Sid Ali Ferdjani	Gymnastics	Men's Pommel Horse	September
Gold	Salim Iles	Swimming	Men's 100m freestyle	6 September
Gold	Salim Iles	Swimming	Men's 50m freestyle	7 September
Gold	Mebarek Soltani	Boxing	Men's Flyweight	8 September
Gold	Mohamed Khaldi	Athletics	Men's 5000 meters	11 September
Gold	Malik Louahla	Athletics	Men's 400 meters	12 September
Gold	Adem Hecini	Athletics	Men's 800 meters	12 September
Gold	Abderrahmane Hammad	Athletics	Men's High jump	13 September
Gold	Baya Rahouli	Athletics	Women's Triple jump	14 September
Silver	Rachida Ouardane	Judo	Women's 70 kg	September
Silver	Salim Boutabcha	Judo	Men's 81 kg	September
Silver	Khaled Meddah	Judo	Men's 90 kg	September
Silver	Mohammed Bouaichaoui	Judo	Men's +100 kg	September
Silver	Amjad Aouda	Boxing	Men's Light Flyweight	8 September
Silver	Benamar Meskine	Boxing	Men's Light Middleweight	8 September
Silver	Malik Louhala; Djamel Belaid; Nabil Salmi; Adem Hecini	Athletics	Men's 4 × 400 meters relay	12 September
Silver	Mohamed Khaldi	Athletics	Men's 1500 meters	14 September
Silver	Kamal Kohil	Athletics	Men's 10,000 meters	14 September
Silver	Abdelhak Hameurlaine; Noureddine Mahmoudi	Tennis	Men's doubles	September
Bronze	Wahiba Belghandi	Weightlifting	Women's 58 kg	September
Bronze	Wahiba Belghandi	Weightlifting	Women's 58 kg	September
Bronze	Rym Draoui	Karate	Women's +65 kg	September
Bronze	Tarek Admane	Karate	Men's 80 kg	September
Bronze	Lynda Mekzine	Judo	Women's 57 kg	September
Bronze	Zoubida Bouyacoub	Judo	Women's 63 kg	September
Bronze	Amar Meridja	Judo	Men's 66 kg	September
Bronze	Noureddine Yagoubi	Judo	Men's 73 kg	September
Bronze	Zahra Gamir	Fencing	Women's Individual Épée	September
Bronze	Mohamed Allalou	Boxing	Men's Light Welterweight	7 September
Bronze	Laïd Bessou	Athletics	Men's 3000 meters steeplechase	12 September
Bronze	Raouf Benabid	Swimming	400 m I.M.	September

Medals by sport
Sport	1st place, gold medalist(s)	2nd place, silver medalist(s)	3rd place, bronze medalist(s)	Total
Athletics	5	3	1	9
Boxing	1	2	1	4
Fencing	0	0	1	1
Gymnastics	1	0	0	1
Judo	1	4	4	9
Karate	0	0	2	2
Swimming	2	0	1	3
Tennis	0	1	0	1
Weightlifting	0	0	2	2
Total	10	10	12	32

Medals by gender
Gender	1st place, gold medalist(s)	2nd place, silver medalist(s)	3rd place, bronze medalist(s)	Total
Male	8	9	6	23
Female	2	1	6	9
Total	10	10	12	32
