= Algeria at the 2005 Mediterranean Games =

- IOC code: ALG
- NOC: Algerian Olympic Committee

in Almería
- Competitors: 114
- Medals Ranked 9th: Gold 9 Silver 5 Bronze 11 Total 25

Mediterranean Games appearances (overview)
- 1967; 1971; 1975; 1979; 1983; 1987; 1991; 1993; 1997; 2001; 2005; 2009; 2013; 2018; 2022; 2026

Algeria (ALG) competed at the 2005 Mediterranean Games in Almería, Spain, with a total number of 114 participants (84 men and 30 women).

== Medal summary ==
=== Medal table ===
Medal	Name	Sport	Event	Date
Gold	Ali Saïdi-Sief	Athletics	Men's 5000 metres	
Gold	Saïd Belhout	Athletics	Men's Half Marathon	
Gold	Souad Aït Salem	Athletics	Women's 10000 metres	
Gold	Baya Rahouli	Athletics	Women's Triple jump	
Gold	Leila Lassouani	Weightlifting	Women's 63 kg (Clean & Jerk)	June
Gold	Omar Rebahi	Judo	Men's 60 kg	
Gold	Soraya Haddad	Judo	Women's 48 kg	
Gold	Salim Iles	Swimming	Men's 50 m Freestyle	June
Gold	Salim Iles	Swimming	Men's 100 m Freestyle	June
Silver	Issam Nima	Athletics	Men's Long jump	
Silver	Sid Ali Ferdjani	Gymnastics	Men's Pommel Horse	
Silver	Leila Lassouani	Weightlifting	Women's 63 kg (Snatch)	June
Silver	Ilhem Eldjon	Karate	Women's 55 kg	
Silver	Lamine Ouahab; Slimane Saoudi	Tennis	Men's doubles	
Bronze	Khoudir Aggoune	Athletics	Men's 5000 metres	
Bronze	Maamar Rachif	Athletics	Men's 1500 m wheelchair	
Bronze	Mohamed Beldjord	Boxing	Men's 60 kg	
Bronze	Choayb Oussaci	Boxing	Men's 69 kg	
Bronze	Noureddine Yagoubi	Judo	Men's 73 kg	
Bronze	Abderahmane Benamadi	Judo	Men's 81 kg	
Bronze	Lynda Mekzine	Judo	Women's 52 kg	
Bronze	Koceila Hamadini	Karate	Men's 70 kg	
Bronze	Yacine Gouri	Karate	Men's 75 kg	
Bronze	Nabil Kebbab	Swimming	Men's 100 m freestyle	June
Bronze	Sofiane Daid	Swimming	Men's 200 m breaststroke	June

Medals by sport
Sport	1st place, gold medalist(s)	2nd place, silver medalist(s)	3rd place, bronze medalist(s)	Total
Athletics	4	1	2	7
Boxing	0	0	2	2
Gymnastics	0	1	0	1
Judo	2	0	3	5
Karate	0	1	2	3
Swimming	2	0	2	4
Tennis	0	1	0	1
Weightlifting	1	1	0	2
Total	9	5	11	25

Medals by gender
Gender	1st place, gold medalist(s)	2nd place, silver medalist(s)	3rd place, bronze medalist(s)	Total
Male	5	3	10	18
Female	4	2	1	7
Total	9	5	11	25

== Results by event ==
Basketball

- Men's Team Competition
  - Karim Atamna
  - Farid Belhimeur
  - Moured Boughedir
  - Sofiane Boulaya
  - Ali Bouziane
  - Djillali Canon
  - Farouk Djillali
  - Redouane Fergati
  - Abdelhalim Kaouane
  - Nadjim Ouali
  - Tarek Oukid
  - Abdelhalim Sayah

Boxing

- Men's Light Flyweight (– 48 kg)
  - Hamoud Boubraouat
- Men's Flyweight (– 51 kg)
  - Abdelhakim Ouradi
    - Preliminary Round — Lost to Artur Gavoci (ALB), 14:15
- Men's Bantamweight (– 54 kg)
  - Malik Bouziane
- Men's Featherweight (– 57 kg)
  - Hadj Belkhir
- Men's Super Lightweight (– 64 kg)
  - Ben Yamine Besmi
- Men's Lightweight (– 60 kg)
  - Mohamed Beldjord
- Men's Welterweight (– 69 kg)
  - Choayb Oussaci
- Men's Middleweight (– 75 kg)
  - Nabil Kassel
- Men's Light Heavyweight (– 81 kg)
  - Moh Akli Amari

Swimming

- Men's Competition
  - Sofiane Daid
  - Mehdi Hamama
  - Salim Iles
  - Nabil Kebbab
  - Mahrez Mebarek
  - Aghiles Slimani
- Women's Competition
  - Sabrina Azzouz
  - Fella Bennaceur
  - Souad Cherouati
  - Sabria Faiza Dahane
  - Sarah Hadj Abdelrahmane
  - Amira Kouza
  - Kenza Matoub

== See also ==
- Algeria at the 2004 Summer Olympics
- Algeria at the 2008 Summer Olympics
