= Algeria at the 1975 Mediterranean Games =

- IOC code: ALG
- NOC: Algerian Olympic Committee

in Algiers
- Competitors: 314
- Medals Ranked 8th: Gold 4 Silver 7 Bronze 9 Total 20

Mediterranean Games appearances (overview)
- 1967; 1971; 1975; 1979; 1983; 1987; 1991; 1993; 1997; 2001; 2005; 2009; 2013; 2018; 2022

Algeria (ALG) competed at the 1975 Mediterranean Games at home in Algiers, Algeria. 314 Algerian competitors took part in this competition and they won 20 medals.

== Medal summary ==
=== Medal table ===
Medal	Name	Sport	Event
Gold	Boualem Rahoui	Athletics	Men's 3000 m steeplechase
Gold	Algeria national football team	Football	Men's tournament
Gold	Mohamed Missouri	Boxing	Men's Middleweight
Gold	Hocine Nini	Boxing	Men's Featherweight
Silver	Sid Ali Djouadi	Athletics	Men's 800 metres
Silver	Jean-Marie Djebaili	Athletics	Men's Shot put
Silver	Lakhdar Rahal	Athletics	Men's Pole vault
Silver	Mohamed Alik	Boxing	Men's Bantamweight
Silver	Ahmed Siad	Boxing	Men's Light Flyweight
Silver	Ahmed Tarbi	Weightlifting	Men's Snatch 52 kg
Silver	Ben Ali Guechmi	Boxing	Men's Light Middleweight
Bronze	Mahieddine Battache	Boxing	Men's Flyweight
Bronze	Chérif Benali	Athletics	Men's 5000 metres
Bronze	Boualem Rahoui	Athletics	Men's 10,000 metres
Bronze	Mohamed Galoul	Boxing	Men's Heavyweight
Bronze	Algeria Cycling Team	Cycling	Men's team pursuit
Bronze	Algeria men's national handball team	Handball	Men's tournament
Bronze	Abdeslam Mahmoudi	Tennis	Men's Singles
Bronze	Abdeslam Mahmoudi; Sebti Bounaib	Tennis	Men's Doubles
Bronze	Benabdallah	Judo	Men's All categories

Medals by sport
Sport	1st place, gold medalist(s)	2nd place, silver medalist(s)	3rd place, bronze medalist(s)	Total
Athletics	1	3	2	6
Boxing	2	3	2	7
Cycling	0	0	1	1
Football	1	0	0	1
Handball	0	0	1	1
Judo	0	0	1	1
Tennis	0	0	2	2
Weightlifting	0	1	0	1
Total	4	7	9	20

Medals by gender
Gender	1st place, gold medalist(s)	2nd place, silver medalist(s)	3rd place, bronze medalist(s)	Total
Male	4	7	9	20
Female	0	0	0	0
Total	4	7	9	20

== Athletics ==
Men
Track & road events

Athlete	Event	Semifinal		Final	
Athlete	Event	Result	Rank	Result	Rank
Teraya Taoufik Chaouch	100 m		Q	10.84	6
Brahim Amour	100 m		Q	11.20	8
Sid Ali Djouadi	800 m		Q	1.48.8	2nd place, silver medalist(s)
Amar Brahmia	800 m		Q	1.49.2	4
Kamel Guemar	1500 m		Q	3.46.2	7
Chérif Benali	5000 m	—N/a		13.44.0	3rd place, bronze medalist(s)
Boualem Rahoui	10000 m	—N/a		28.40.8	3rd place, bronze medalist(s)
Abdelkader Boudjemaa	110 m hurdles	—N/a		15.61	8
Lahcene Belhadjoudjaa	400 m hurdles	—N/a		54.45	7
Boualem Rahoui	3000 m steeple	—N/a		8.20.2	1st place, gold medalist(s)

Women
Track & road events

Athlete	Event	Semifinal		Final	
Athlete	Event	Result	Rank	Result	Rank
Leila Idir	400 m	—N/a		61.36	6

Key

- Note–Ranks given for track events are within the athlete's heat only
- Q = Qualified for the next round
- q = Qualified for the next round as a fastest loser or, in field events, by position without achieving the qualifying target
- NR = National record
- N/A = Round not applicable for the event
- Bye = Athlete not required to compete in round

== Boxing ==
Men

Athlete	Event	Round of 16	Quarterfinals	Semifinals	Final	
Athlete	Event	Opposition Result	Opposition Result	Opposition Result	Opposition Result	Rank
Ahmed Siad	Light Flyweight	—N/a		Rodriguez (ESP); L –	Did not advance	3rd place, bronze medalist(s)
Mahieddine Battache	Flyweight	—N/a		Strembelias (GRE); W –	Menciasci (ITA); L –	2nd place, silver medalist(s)
Mohamed Alik	Bantamweight	—N/a		Mugnai (ITA); L –	Did not advance	3rd place, bronze medalist(s)
Hocine Nini	Featherweight	—N/a		Salah (EGY); W –	Ciaramella (ITA); W –	1st place, gold medalist(s)
Ben Ali Guechmi	Light Middleweight	—N/a		Delic (YUG); L –	Did not advance	3rd place, bronze medalist(s)
Mohamed Missouri	Light flyweight	—N/a		Khalti (EGY); W –	Zerkati (MAR); W –	1st place, gold medalist(s)
Mohamed Galoul	Light flyweight	—N/a		Pelizzari (ITA); L –	Did not advance	3rd place, bronze medalist(s)

== Football ==
=== Group stage ===
==== Group A ====
Team	Pld	W	D	L	GF	GA	GD	Pts
Algeria B	4	4	0	0	10	1	+9	8
France B	4	3	0	1	6	3	+3	6
Egypt	4	2	0	2	9	7	+2	4
Libya	4	1	0	3	4	8	−4	2
Greece Ol.	4	0	0	4	3	13	−10	0

24 August 1975	Algeria B	2 – 0	France B	Stade 5 Juillet 1962, Algiers
	Draoui 5'; Ighili 42'			Referee: ... (Yugoslavia)

26 August 1975	Algeria B	5 – 0	Greece Ol.	Stade 5 Juillet 1962, Algiers
	Safsafi 14'; Draoui 18', 59'... (...); Betrouni 89'

29 August 1975	Algeria B	1 – 0	Egypt	Stade 5 Juillet 1962, Algiers
	Draoui 85'			Attendance: 40,000; Referee: ... (Tunisia)

31 August 1975	Algeria B	2 – 1	Libya	Stade 5 Juillet 1962, Algiers
	Keddou 5', 17' (pen.)		... 75'

==== Semi-finals ====
4 September 1975	Algeria B	2 – 1 (a.e.t.)	Tunisia	Stade 5 Juillet 1962, Algiers
	Naïm 62'; Draoui 96'		Kammoun 70'	Attendance: 70,000

==== Final ====
6 September 1975	Algeria B	3 – 2 (a.e.t.)	France B	Stade 5 Juillet 1962, Algiers
	Kaoua 71'; Betrouni 90'; Menguelti 111'		Rouyer 35'; Schaer 76' (pen.)	Attendance: 70,000

== See also ==
- Algeria at the Mediterranean Games
