= Mitko =

Mitko (Cyrillic: Митко or Митько) is a Bulgarian and Macedonian masculine given name, a short version of Dimitar. It is also an occasional surname that may refer to the following notable people:

Given name

- Mitko Bachev (born 1960), Bulgarian luger
- Mitko Čavkov (born 1963), Interior Minister of Macedonia
- Mitko Dimitrov (born 1953), Bulgarian
- Mitko Dobrev, Bulgarian football manager
- Mitko Grablev, Bulgarian weightlifter
- Mitko Kabakov (born 1955), Bulgarian sailor
- Mitko Khadzhiev (born 1961), Bulgarian alpine skier
- Mitko Lukovski, Macedonian basketball coach
- Mitko Milushev (1914–?), Bulgarian equestrian
- Mitko Mitev (born 1970), Bulgarian weightlifter
- Mitko Mitkov (born 2000), Bulgarian footballer
- Mitko Petkov (1926–?), Bulgarian wrestler
- Mitko Stojkovski (born 1972), Macedonian football defender
- Mitko Sabev (born 1961), Bulgarian businessman
- Mitko Stoilov (born 1983), Macedonian handball player
- Mitko Todorov (born 1956), Bulgarian volleyball player
- Mitko Trendafilov (born 1969), Bulgarian footballer
- Mitko Tsenov (born 1993), Bulgarian middle-distance runner

Surname

- Michał Mitko (born 1988), Polish speedway rider
- Oleksandr Mitko, Ukrainian football player
- Thimi Mitko (1820–1890), Albanian activist
