= Algeria at the 1983 Mediterranean Games =

- IOC code: ALG
- NOC: Algerian Olympic Committee

in Casablanca
- Competitors: 172
- Medals Ranked 8th: Gold 4 Silver 3 Bronze 7 Total 14

Mediterranean Games appearances (overview)
- 1967; 1971; 1975; 1979; 1983; 1987; 1991; 1993; 1997; 2001; 2005; 2009; 2013; 2018; 2022

Algeria (ALG) competed at the 1983 Mediterranean Games in Casablanca, Morocco.

== Medal summary ==
=== Medal table ===
Medal	Name	Sport	Event
Gold	Othmane Belfaa	Athletics	Men's High jump
Gold	Brahim Brahimi	Boxing	Men's Light Flyweight
Gold	Mustapha Moussa	Boxing	Men's Light Heavyweight
Gold	Mohamed Bouchiche	Boxing	Men's Heavyweight
Silver	Algeria men's national handball team	Handball	Men's tournament
Silver	Dalila Tayebi	Athletics	Heptathlon
Silver	Ahmed Tarbi	Weightlifting	Men's 56 kg
Bronze	Mohamed Bensaad	Athletics	Decathlon
Bronze	Mustafa Kouchane	Boxing	Men's Flyweight
Bronze	Bellil	Boxing	Men's Bantamweight
Bronze	Azzedine Saïd	Boxing	Men's Featherweight
Bronze	Ali Bessad	Boxing	Men's Light Welterweight
Bronze	Farouk Hamza	Cycling	Men's road race
Bronze	Ahmed Moussa	Judo	Men's 60 kg

Medals by sport
Sport	1st place, gold medalist(s)	2nd place, silver medalist(s)	3rd place, bronze medalist(s)	Total
Athletics	1	1	1	3
Boxing	3	0	4	7
Cycling	0	0	1	1
Handball	0	1	0	1
Judo	0	0	1	1
Weightlifting	0	1	0	1
Total	4	3	7	14

Medals by gender
Gender	1st place, gold medalist(s)	2nd place, silver medalist(s)	3rd place, bronze medalist(s)	Total
Male	4	2	7	13
Female	0	1	0	1
Total	4	3	7	14
