= 1992 Summer Olympics medal table =

1992 Summer Olympics medals
- Location: Barcelona, Spain

Highlights
- Most gold medals: Unified Team (45)
- Most total medals: Unified Team (112)
- Medalling NOCs: 64

World map showing the medal achievements of each country during the 1992 Summer Olympics Legend: represents countries that won at least one gold medal. represents countries that won at least one silver medal but no gold medals. represents countries that won at least one bronze medal (no gold or silver). represents participating countries that did not win medals. represents entities that did not participate at the 1992 Summer Olympics.

The 1992 Summer Olympics, officially known as the Games of the XXV Olympiad, and officially branded as Barcelona '92, were an international multi-sport event held in Barcelona, Catalonia, Spain, from 25 July to 9 August 1992. A total of 9,356 athletes representing 169 National Olympic Committees (NOCs) participated. The games featured 257 events in 25 sports and 34 disciplines. Badminton, baseball, and women's judo were included as official medal events for the first time.

Following the dissolution of the Soviet Union, athletes from twelve of the fifteen former Soviet republics competed together as part of the Unified Team. Two other former republics, Estonia and Latvia, competed independently for the first time since 1936, while Lithuania did so for the first time since 1928. The three Baltic states were annexed by the Soviet Union during World War II. South Africa, which had been excluded from the Olympics for its use of the apartheid system in sports, returned to the games for the first time since 1960.

Bosnia and Herzegovina, Croatia, and Slovenia competed independently, as opposed to as a part of Yugoslavia, for the first time following the breakup of Yugoslavia. Due to conduct in the ongoing Yugoslav Wars, the Federal Republic of Yugoslavia was placed under sanctions by United Nations Security Council Resolution 757, which prevented the country from taking part in the Olympics. Individual Yugoslav athletes were allowed to take part as independent participants and, with Macedonian athletes who could not appear under their own flag because their NOC had not yet been formed, combined to form the Independent Olympic Participants team. East and West Germany also competed together for the first time since 1964, following the German reunification.

Athletes representing 64 NOCs received at least one medal, with 37 NOCs winning at least one gold medal. The Unified Team won the most gold medals, with 45, and the most overall medals, with 112. Algeria, Indonesia, and Lithuania won their nations' first Summer Olympic gold medals. It was also the first Olympic medal of any kind for Lithuania. Croatia, Israel, Malaysia, Namibia, Qatar, and Slovenia won their nation's first Olympic medals. Belarusian gymnast Vitaly Scherbo of the Unified Team won the most gold and overall medals among individual participants, with six (all gold).

== Medal table ==
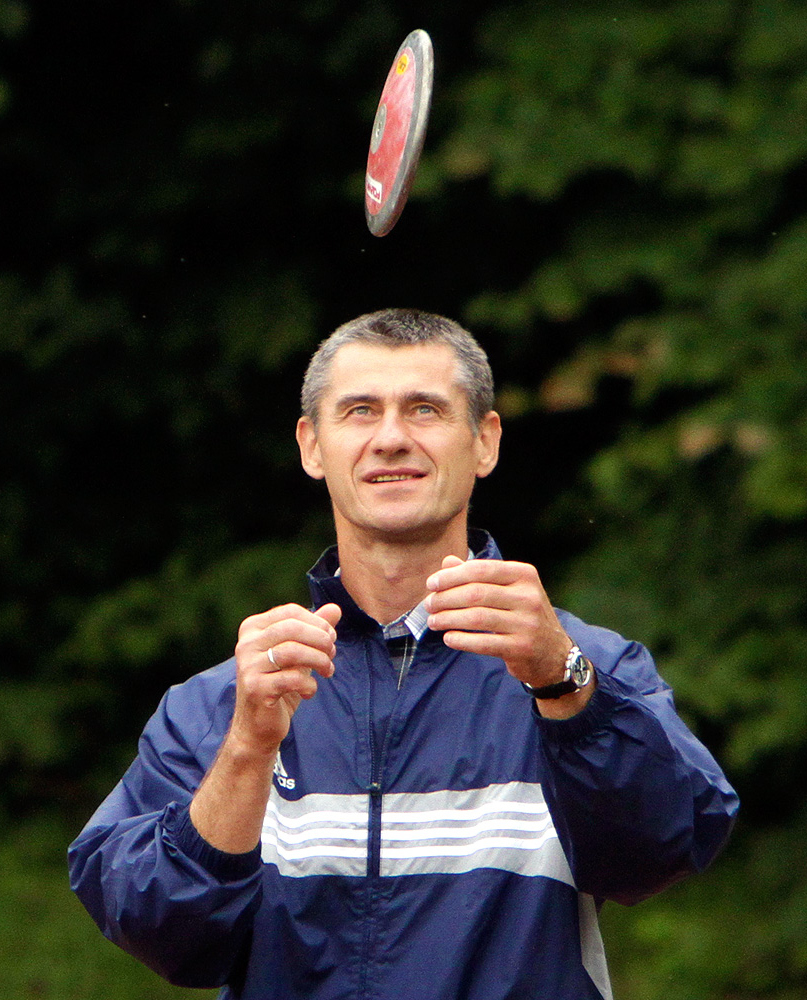
Lithuanian discus thrower Romas Ubartas, pictured here in 2011, won gold in the men's discus throw. In doing so, he won Lithuania's first Olympic medal of any kind.

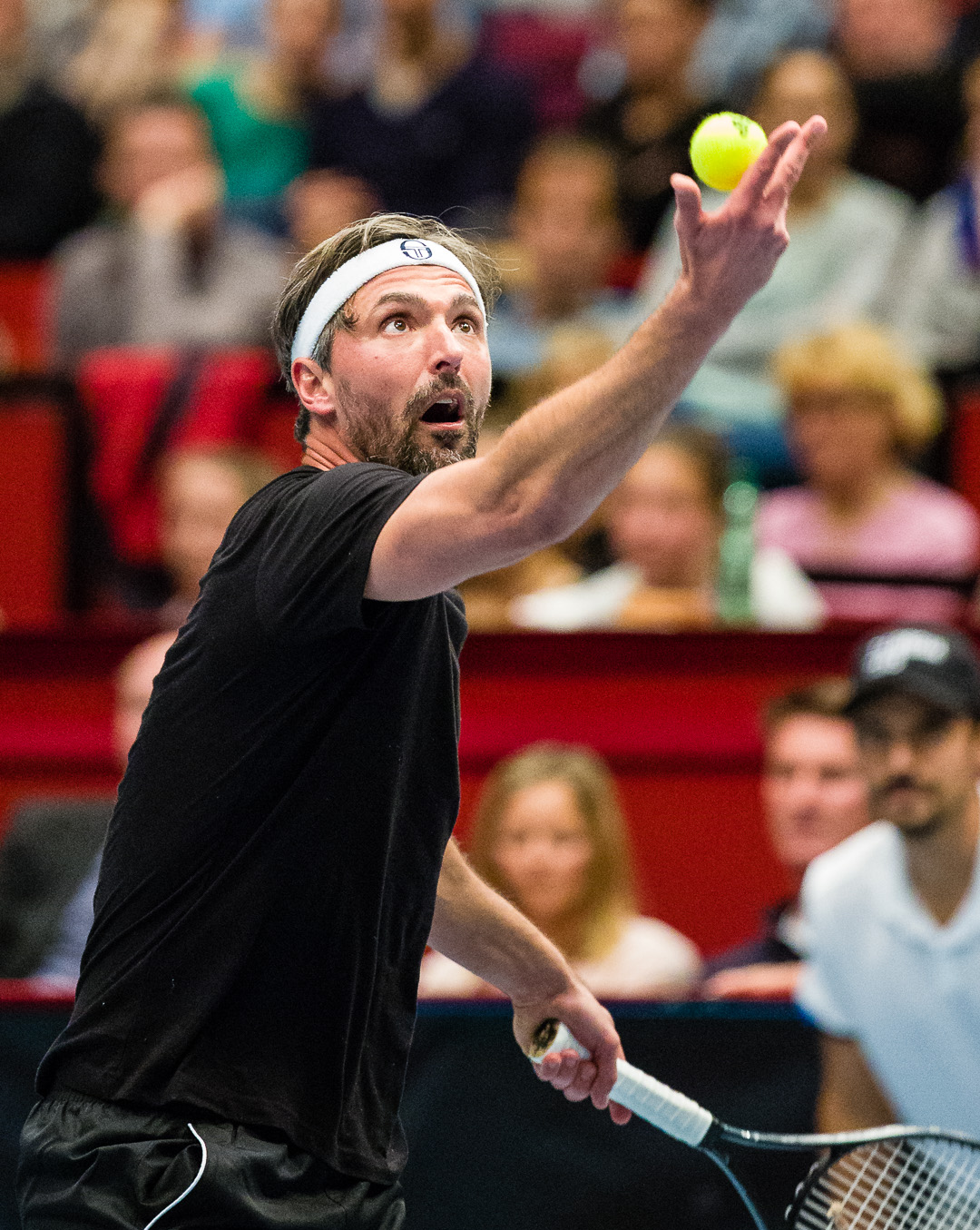
Croatian tennis player Goran Ivanišević, pictured here in 2016, won Croatia's first ever Olympic medal. He did so alongside fellow Croatian Goran Prpić in the men's tennis doubles event.

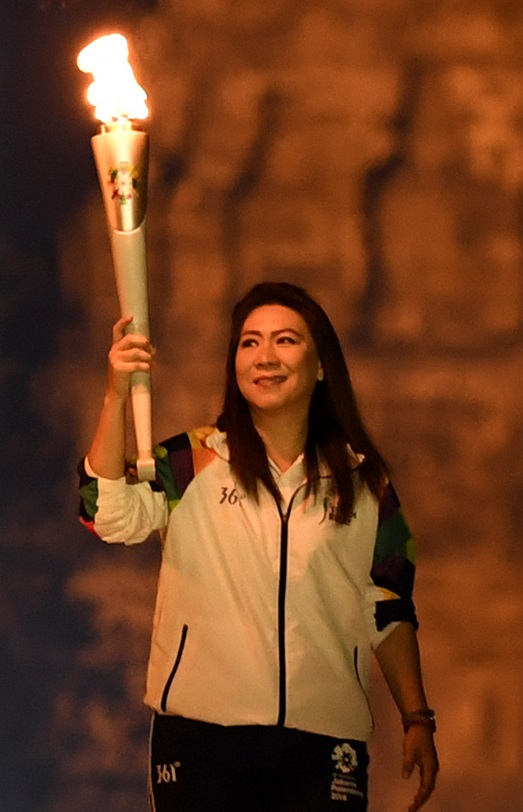
Indonesia badminton player Susi Susanti, pictured here at the 2018 Asian Games, won Indonesia's first ever Olympic gold medal, doing so in the badminton women's singles event.

The medal table is based on information provided by the International Olympic Committee (IOC) and is consistent with IOC conventional sorting in its published medal tables. The table uses the Olympic medal table sorting method. By default, the table is ordered by the number of gold medals the athletes from a nation have won, where a nation is an entity represented by a NOC. The number of silver medals is taken into consideration next and then the number of bronze medals. If teams are still tied, equal ranking is given and they are listed alphabetically by their IOC country code.

In gymnastics events, there were eight ties for medals. Two gold medals and no silver medals were awarded due to first-place ties in the men's pommel horse and women's vault events. Two silver medals and no bronze medals were awarded due to second-place ties in the men's floor, men's horizontal bar, and women's balance beam events. Three bronze medals were awarded due to third-place ties in the men's parallel bars and women's floor events, while two bronze medals were awarded in the men's rings event.

In women's solo synchronized swimming there was also a two-way tie for first, which resulted in two gold medals and no silver medals being awarded.

Events in boxing and tennis resulted in bronze medals being awarded to each of the competitors who lost their semi-final matches, as opposed to them taking part in a third place tiebreaker. Events in judo used a repechage system which also resulted in two bronze medals being awarded.

Key

‡ Changes in medal standings (see below)

* Host nation (Spain)

1992 Summer Olympics medal table
Rank	NOC	Gold	Silver	Bronze	Total
1	Unified Team‡	45	38	29	112
2	United States	37	34	37	108
3	Germany	33	21	28	82
4	China	16	22	16	54
5	Cuba	14	6	11	31
6	Spain*	13	7	2	22
7	South Korea	12	5	12	29
8	Hungary	11	12	7	30
9	France	8	5	16	29
10	Australia	7	9	11	27
11	Canada	7	4	7	18
12	Italy	6	5	8	19
13	Great Britain	5	3	12	20
14	Romania	4	6	8	18
15	Czechoslovakia	4	2	1	7
16	North Korea	4	0	5	9
17	Japan	3	8	11	22
18	Bulgaria	3	7	6	16
19	Poland	3	6	10	19
20	Netherlands	2	6	7	15
21	Kenya	2	4	2	8
22	Norway	2	4	1	7
23	Turkey	2	2	2	6
24	Indonesia	2	2	1	5
25	Brazil	2	1	0	3
26	Greece	2	0	0	2
27	Sweden	1	7	4	12
28	New Zealand	1	4	5	10
29	Finland	1	2	2	5
30	Denmark	1	1	4	6
31	Morocco	1	1	1	3
32	Ireland	1	1	0	2
33	Ethiopia	1	0	2	3
34	Algeria	1	0	1	2
34	Estonia	1	0	1	2
34	Lithuania	1	0	1	2
37	Switzerland	1	0	0	1
38	Jamaica	0	3	1	4
38	Nigeria	0	3	1	4
40	Latvia	0	2	1	3
41	Austria	0	2	0	2
41	Namibia	0	2	0	2
41	South Africa	0	2	0	2
44	Belgium	0	1	2	3
44	Croatia	0	1	2	3
44	Independent Olympic Participants	0	1	2	3
44	Iran	0	1	2	3
48	Israel	0	1	1	2
49	Chinese Taipei	0	1	0	1
49	Mexico	0	1	0	1
49	Peru	0	1	0	1
52	Mongolia	0	0	2	2
52	Slovenia	0	0	2	2
54	Argentina	0	0	1	1
54	Bahamas	0	0	1	1
54	Colombia	0	0	1	1
54	Ghana	0	0	1	1
54	Malaysia	0	0	1	1
54	Pakistan	0	0	1	1
54	Philippines	0	0	1	1
54	Puerto Rico	0	0	1	1
54	Qatar	0	0	1	1
54	Suriname	0	0	1	1
54	Thailand	0	0	1	1
Totals (64 entries)		260	257	298	815

== Changes in medal standings ==
List of official changes in medal standings
Sport/event	Athlete (NOC)	1st place, gold medalist(s)	2nd place, silver medalist(s)	3rd place, bronze medalist(s)	Net change	Comment
Weightlifting, men's 82.5 kg	Ibragim Samadov (EUN)			−1	−1	All three medalists had the same combined lift score, but Ibragim Samadov, who weighed five grams more than his competitors, was placed third based on weightlifting tiebreakers which ranked competitors based on their weight. During the award ceremony, Samadov is said to have intentionally thrown his medal to the ground and walked off. Another athlete brought Samadov his medal but he threw it again. Following this, the IOC stripped his bronze medal and disqualified him from any future events for the rest of his life. The bronze medal was never re-allocated to another athlete because the incident took place after the event had been completed.

== See also ==
- All-time Olympic Games medal table
- List of 1992 Summer Olympics medal winners
- 1992 Winter Olympics medal table
- 1992 Summer Paralympics medal table
