= Weightlifting at the 1992 Summer Olympics – Men's 56 kg =

Weightlifting at the Olympics

Men's 56 kg at the Games of the XXV Olympiad
- Venue: Pavelló de l'Espanya Industrial
- Date: 27 July 1992
- Competitors: 22 from 17 nations
- Winning total: 287.5 kg

Medalists
1st place, gold medalist(s)		Jeon Byeong-gwan	South Korea
2nd place, silver medalist(s)		Liu Shoubin	China
3rd place, bronze medalist(s)		Luo Jianming	China

The Men's Bantamweight Weightlifting Event (– 56 kg) is the second-lightest men's event at the Olympic weightlifting competition, limiting competitors to a maximum of 52 kilograms of body mass. The competition took place on 27 July 1992 in the Pavelló de l'Espanya Industrial.

Each lifter performed in both the snatch and clean and jerk lifts, with the final score being the sum of the lifter's best result in each. The athlete received three attempts in each of the two lifts; the score for the lift was the heaviest weight successfully lifted. Ties were broken by the lifter with the lightest body weight.

== Results ==
Rank	Name	Body Weight	Snatch (kg)			Clean & Jerk (kg)			Total (kg)
Rank	Name	Body Weight	1	2	3	1	2	3	Total (kg)
1st place, gold medalist(s)	Chun Byung-Kwan (KOR)	55.90	125.0	130.0	132.5 OR	155.0	~~170.0~~	~~170.0~~	287.5
2nd place, silver medalist(s)	Liu Shoubin (CHN)	55.60	130.0	~~135.0~~	~~138.0~~	142.5	147.5	~~152.5~~	277.5
3rd place, bronze medalist(s)	Luo Jianming (CHN)	55.65	~~125.0~~	125.0	~~130.0~~	142.5	147.5	152.5	277.5
4	Laurent Fombertasse (FRA)	55.85	105.0	110.0	112.5	147.5	-	-	260.0
5	Katsuhiko Sakuma (JPN)	55.40	115.0	120.0	~~122.5~~	130.0	~~135.0~~	135.0	255.0
6	Tibor Karczag (HUN)	55.65	112.5	115.0	~~117.5~~	140.0	-	-	255.0
7	Kim Yong-chol (PRK)	55.75	105.0	110.0	~~112.5~~	140.0	~~145.0~~	-	255.0
8	Marek Gorzelniak (POL)	55.80	110.0	115.0	~~117.5~~	140.0	~~145.0~~	~~145.0~~	255.0
9	Ferenc Lénárt (HUN)	55.95	110.0	112.5	~~115.0~~	130.0	135.0	140.0	252.5
10	Sodikin (INA)	55.65	110.0	~~115.0~~	~~117.5~~	140.0	~~145.0~~	~~145.0~~	250.0
11	Aurel Sîrbu (ROU)	55.50	107.5	~~112.5~~	~~112.5~~	~~140.0~~	140.0	~~147.5~~	247.5
12	José Zurera (ESP)	55.55	107.5	112.5	~~115.0~~	135.0	~~140.0~~	~~140.0~~	247.5
13	Katsuhisa Nitta (JPN)	55.75	~~105.0~~	~~105.0~~	105.0	140.0	-	-	245.0
14	Giovanni Scarantino (ITA)	55.55	110.0	~~112.5~~	-	130.0	-	-	240.0
15	José Luis Martínez (ESP)	55.65	105.0	~~110.0~~	~~110.0~~	130.0	-	-	235.0
16	Lin Tzu-yao (TPE)	55.70	105.0	~~110.0~~	110.0	125.0	-	-	235.0
17	Naranjargalyn Batjargal (MGL)	55.95	102.5	107.5	~~110.0~~	127.5	-	-	235.0
18	Ponnuswamy Rangaswamy (IND)	55.85	97.5	102.5	~~105.0~~	127.5	-	-	230.0
19	Arbi Trab (TUN)	55.85	95.0	100.0	~~102.5~~	120.0	-	-	220.0
20	Pascal Arnou (FRA)	55.60	~~102.5~~	~~102.5~~	~~105.0~~	-	-	-	DNF
21	Hafız Süleymanoğlu (TUR)	55.75	~~127.5~~	~~127.5~~	-	-	-	-	DNF
22	Orlando Vásquez (NCA)	55.90	~~105.0~~	~~105.0~~	-	-	-	-	DNF
23	C. Osorno (COL)	60.00	-	-	-	-	-	-	DNS
