= Algeria at the 1991 Mediterranean Games =

- IOC code: ALG
- NOC: Algerian Olympic Committee

in Athens
- Competitors: 102
- Medals Ranked 7th: Gold 9 Silver 3 Bronze 5 Total 17

Mediterranean Games appearances (overview)
- 1967; 1971; 1975; 1979; 1983; 1987; 1991; 1993; 1997; 2001; 2005; 2009; 2013; 2018; 2022

Algeria (ALG) competed at the 1991 Mediterranean Games in Athens, Greece.

== Medal summary ==
=== Medal table ===
Medal	Name	Sport	Event
Gold	Azzedine Brahmi	Athletics	Men's 3000 metres steeplechase
Gold	Réda Abdenouz	Athletics	Men's 800 metres
Gold	Othmane Belfaa	Athletics	Men's High jump
Gold	Hassiba Boulmerka	Athletics	Women's 800 metres
Gold	Hassiba Boulmerka	Athletics	Women's 1500 metres
Gold	Mohamed Haloun	Boxing	Men's 48 kg
Gold	Ahmed Dine	Boxing	Men's 75 kg
Gold	Abdelhakim Harkat	Judo	Men's 65 kg
Gold	Abdel Monaim Yahiaoui	Weightlifting	Men's 67.5 kg (Total)
Silver	Azzedine Barbas	Weightlifting	Men's 60 kg (Clean & Jerk)
Silver	Abdel Monaim Yahiaoui	Weightlifting	Men's 67.5 kg (Snatch)
Silver	Yacine Benzaid	Wrestling	Men's 48 kg
Bronze	Lotfi Khaïda	Athletics	Men's Triple jump
Bronze	Chiheh Yacine	Boxing	Men's 51 kg
Bronze	Ali Idir	Judo	Men's 60 kg
Bronze	Meziane Dahmani	Judo	Men's 71 kg
Bronze	Abdel Monaim Yahiaoui	Weightlifting	Men's 67.5 kg (Clean & Jerk)

Medals by sport
Sport	1st place, gold medalist(s)	2nd place, silver medalist(s)	3rd place, bronze medalist(s)	Total
Athletics	5	0	1	6
Boxing	2	0	1	3
Judo	1	0	2	3
Weightlifting	1	2	1	4
Wrestling	0	1	0	1
Total	9	3	5	17

Medals by gender
Gender	1st place, gold medalist(s)	2nd place, silver medalist(s)	3rd place, bronze medalist(s)	Total
Male	7	3	5	15
Female	2	0	0	2
Total	9	3	5	17
