= Alek Sandar =

Bulgarian singer-songwriter and music producer

Alek Sandar Алек Сандър
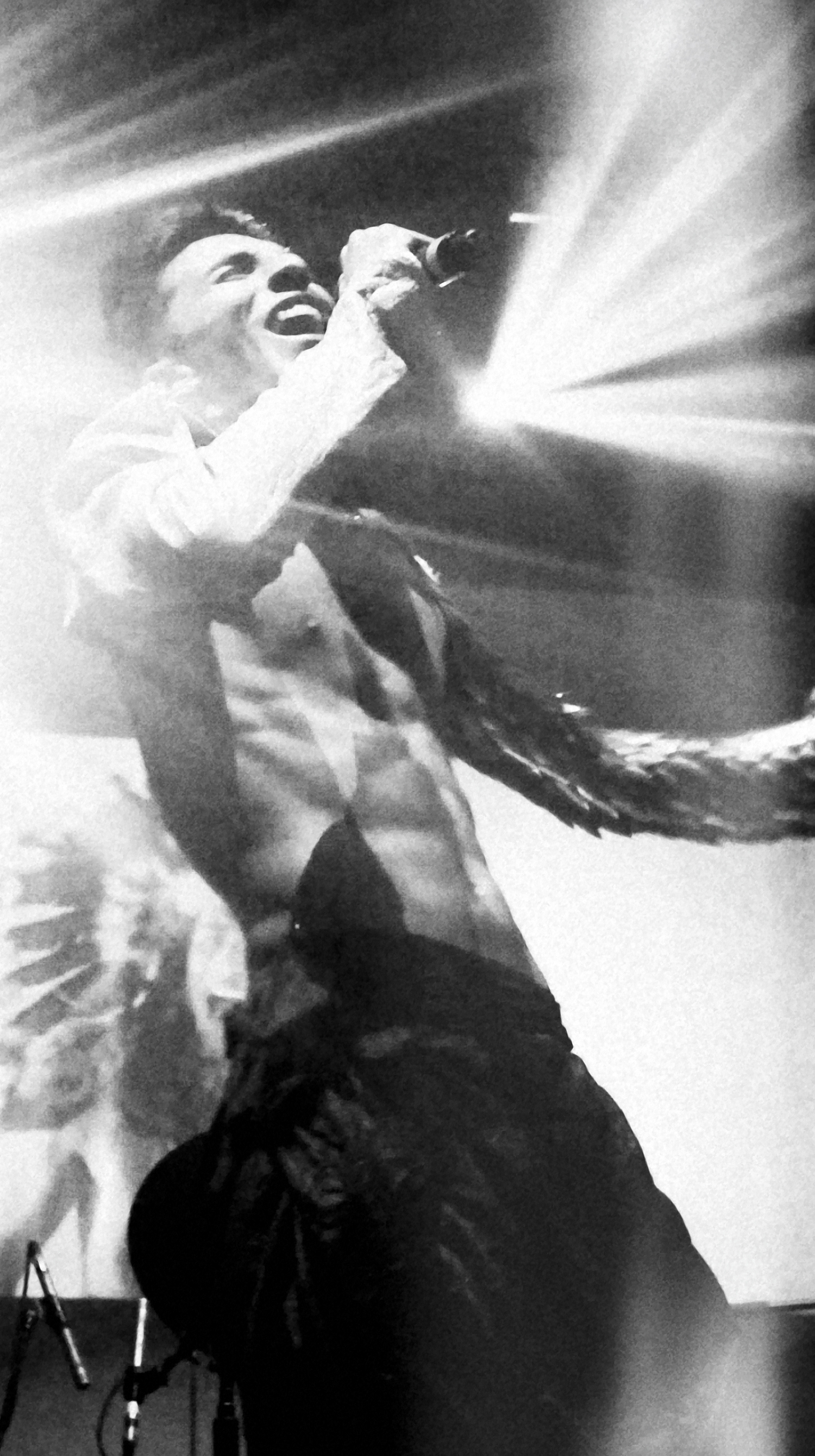
- Alek Sandar performing at the NMS New York Music Festival, Webster Hall in June 2012

Background information
- Born: Aleksandar Nikolov; June 13, 1987 (age 39); Sofia, Bulgaria
- Genres: Pop, dance, electronic
- Occupations: Singer, Songwriter, Music Producer
- Instruments: Vocals, Piano
- Years active: 2008–present
- Labels: Splendid Sounds Records, Universal Music
- Website: http://www.alek-sandar.com

Aleksandar Nikolov (Bulgarian: Александър Николов, born June 13, 1987), better known as Alek Sandar (Bulgarian: Алек Сандър), is a music producer, songwriter and recording artist. Born in Sofia, Bulgaria, Alek Sandar has been raised in Germany and moved to the United States in 2009.

Sandar is known for his singles "P.O.R.N." (featuring Amanda Lepore), "Creature In Me", "Say That You Love Me", "Peaceful Place" (with Andrea), "It Ain't Over" and "You and Me" featuring Bulgarian singer Dess, who is considered to be one of the greatest voices of contemporary Bulgarian music. In 2016, Sandar was one of the top celebrities in the 8th season of VIP Brother, the Bulgarian adaptation of the global reality TV show Big Brother.

Alek Sandar is co-founder of the German Berlin-based dance / pop music label Splendid Sounds Records and has further produced music for Universal Music Germany, Payner and more. In 2010 and 2011, Alek Sandar produced the album Beast for German recording artist Oscar Loya. Alek Sandar further produced remixes for UK based musician Frankmusik (2011), French artist Jérémy Amelin (2009), Australian singer Kimbra (2012) and Bulgarian singer Andrea (2010). In 2013–2016, Sandar charted big hits in Bulgaria as a songwriter, composing hits like "Samo za minuta" by Galin featuring Kamelia, "Nepovtorim" by Kamelia and "Parata ako hvana" by Galin. in 2016, "Parata ako hvana" won a Planeta TV Award for "Club Hit of the Year".

== Early life ==
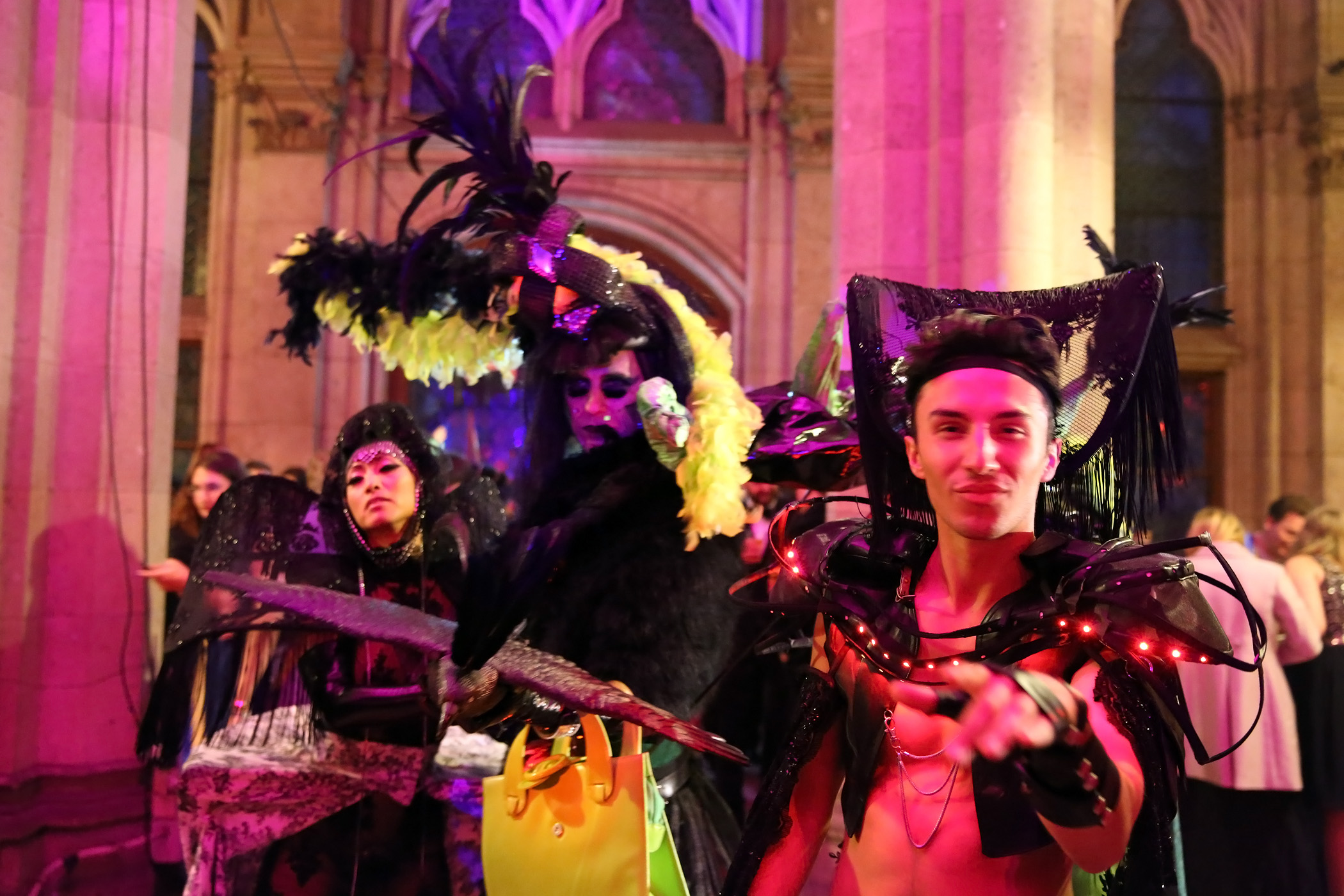
Alek Sandar in 2013

Alek Sandar was born in Sofia, Bulgaria on June 13, 1987. Sandar started playing the piano and singing in the Bulgarian National Group Radiodeca (Radiochildren) at the early age of 5 years. At the age of 8, Alek Sandar composed his first song, a ballad dedicated to his sister. In the same year, Alek Sandar had his first appearance in the prestigious TV show Kato Luvovete (Like The Lions) in front of a national audience. In the following years, Alek Sandar was the Bulgarian voice-over of "Roo" in Disney's Winnie-the-Pooh. In 1995, Sandar and his family moved to Oldenburg, Germany, where his father works as an opera singer until today. In Oldenburg, Alek Sandar took acting classes and played leading roles in productions of the German National Theater Oldenburgisches Staatstheater. While always excelling in school, Alek Sandar spun records as a DJ at school parties and smaller clubs in Northern Germany for several years and set up his first home studio at the age of 14. After graduating high school, Alek Sandar studied International Business Management at the Berlin School of Economics and Law, École supérieure du commerce extérieur Paris and Baruch College, New York City.

== Career beginnings (Splendid Sounds) ==
At the age of 17, Alek Sandar composes two pop songs for the Serbian-Bulgarian Diva Reni. Encouraged by his first international success, Alek Sandar moves to Berlin where he meets Jonathan Wuermeling. They form the Electropop duo Splendid Sounds in 2008 and while performing in various nightclubs in Berlin, they release their album and remix EP Scream.

In 2009, the French record label X-Cite Records request Alek Sandar to create a Splendid Sounds club remix for French Star Academy celebrity Jérémy Amelin. In 2010, Alek Sandar produces another track for Balkan singer Reni and remixes the song Neblagodaren for Bulgarian singer Andrea.

At the same time, Alek Sandar collaborates closely with German singer Oscar Loya, who gained international popularity representing Germany in the Eurovision Song Contest in 2009. He produces 10 songs for Oscar's solo album Beast. Two years later, Learn Something New, one of these tracks, is released again along with a Remix bundle by the L.A.-based US music label Citrusonic Stereophonic in January 2013.

In 2011, Alek Sandar and Jonathan Wuermeling found the independent record label Splendid Sounds Records. In the same year, Sandar produces a Remix for Cherrytree-signed musician Frankmusik and Far East Movement, released by Universal Music Germany.

== 2012 – now (Alek Sandar) ==
With the creation of Splendid Sounds Records, Alek Sandar begins a career as a solo singer under the name of Alek Sandar. For his debut single Creature In Me (2012), Alek Sandar delivers his debut as Creative Director in the official music video, including New York avantgarde performers, Cirque Du Soleil artists, high fashion designs by Vivienne Westwood and Alexander McQueen. The video makes a big impact in his home country Bulgaria, where leading Bulgarian Newspaper 24 chasa writes that "Alek Sandar achieved a level no other Bulgarian has achieved yet".

In June 2012, Alek Sandar is the opening act of the New York Music Festival and New Music Seminar in Webster Hall, New York, making him the first Bulgarian to have participated in this festival. At the same time he qualifies as a winner in an international remixing contest for Australian singer Kimbra. In Fall 2012, Alek Sandar releases "I Adore You" and "It Ain't Over" in Bulgaria, the latter one being a duet with DESS a.k.a. Desi Slava, who is considered one of the greatest voices of Bulgarian contemporary music. While the Bulgarian music market has no official airplay chart, both songs rise up to top positions in the leading national pop radio stations and leading media write that "Alek Sandar and Dess write music history". The duet with DESS is a songwriter collaboration between Alek Sandar and Ansoni, a New York-based music producer composing music for film and commercials in Japan. While working on the common project, they form the producer group Boyplay. The success is topped by the follow-up single "You and Me" in summer 2013. . The single is released on all digital stores worldwide with a remix bundle including progressive house, deep house remixes and a Bulgarian version. Sandar also produces another Bulgarian summer hit: Dess' dance track Baby.

2013 is packed with international performances as the multi-genre singer performs in high-end venues in cities like London, Berlin, Las Vegas, Washington, San Francisco and more. Sandar is invited to be a special guest performer at the famous Vienna Life Ball and headlines the first DOMA Art Festival, a massive 2-week art Festival with national media coverage in Bulgaria, along with New Yorker art icon Yozmit.

In early 2014, Sandar globally releases his debut-EP "Meteors" Next to the singles with Dess, Meteors features the duet "Peaceful Place" with another internationally successful singer - Andrea - and the autobiographic song "Meteors".

With "Peaceful Place", the artists start a campaign in support of minorities around the world deprived of Human Rights, supporting victims in Ukraine, Russia, Venezuela and Syria. The singers premiere the song with a live performance at the yearly Planeta TV awards, one of Bulgaria's music highlights of the year. International media, including CNN, report about this. In an interview, Sandar says that both artists would have been arrested, if they had released this song with the same video in Russia. The video clip shows Sandar and Andrea holding up the rainbow flag / LGBT flag in a Roma slum neighborhood in Sofia, surrounded by ethnic Romani people of all ages.

The pilot "Say That You Love Me" is released on the global music video platform VEVO, making Alek Sandar the first Bulgarian artist with a channel on that video streaming platform. In the video clip, Sandar proves again his talent as director and producer, shooting at world-famous locations such as the Plaza Hotel in Manhattan. The song is also presented to a wide German audience at the concert "Classic Meets Pop" in Oldenburg, Germany, which is considered one of the musical highlights of the year in Northwest Germany.

In the beginning of 2016, "Parata Ako Hvana", a song Sandar co-wrote for Bulgarian singer Galin, receives the Planeta TV Award for "Club Hit of The Year".

In September 2016, Sandar is one of the protagonists of the popular TV Show in Bulgaria VIP Brother, the Bulgarian celebrity version of the reality TV show Big Brother, along with other celebrities like the popfolk singers Emanuela and Reni, former football player and president of the Bulgarian Professional Football League Valentin Mihov and international box legend Mike Tyson.

== Life in New York ==
Openly bisexual, Alek Sandar's international performances and video clips make him a highly discussed figure in his home country Bulgaria. Bulgarian media frequently refer to Alek Sandar as the male Lady Gaga. Even though the musician himself does not perceive his work as extraordinarily avant-garde, TV and newspapers frequently refer to him as eccentric and scandalous, quoting his video clips, nightlife performances and close relations with New Yorker nightlife LGBT personalities Amanda Lepore, Richie Rich, Susanne Bartsch and Yozmit.

In 2015, Alek Sandar releases "P.O.R.N", a song talking about our need to display our life on social media by being sexy and seeking likes. The song features international celebrity and transgender icon Amanda Lepore. The premiere of the song was held at Susanne Bartsch's "On Top" Party at the Top of the Standard Hotel, New York, a party named to be one of Manhattan's's top parties by Paper Magazine and Ny Times. The uncensored version of the video clip #YourLifeIsPorn premiered on Pornhub.
