= Algeria at the 1971 Mediterranean Games =

- IOC code: ALG
- NOC: Algerian Olympic Committee

in Izmir
- Competitors: 38
- Medals Ranked 11th: Gold 0 Silver 0 Bronze 1 Total 1

Mediterranean Games appearances (overview)
- 1967; 1971; 1975; 1979; 1983; 1987; 1991; 1993; 1997; 2001; 2005; 2009; 2013; 2018; 2022

Algeria (ALG) competed at the 1971 Mediterranean Games in İzmir, Turkey.

== Medal summary ==
=== Medal table ===
Medal	Name	Sport	Event
Bronze	Azzedine Azzouzi	Athletics	Men's 800 metres

Medals by sport
Sport	1st place, gold medalist(s)	2nd place, silver medalist(s)	3rd place, bronze medalist(s)	Total
Athletics	0	0	1	1
Total	0	0	1	1

Medals by gender
Gender	1st place, gold medalist(s)	2nd place, silver medalist(s)	3rd place, bronze medalist(s)	Total
Male	0	0	1	1
Female	0	0	0	0
Total	0	0	1	1
