= Anders Bergström =

Anders Bergström may refer to:

- Anders Bergström (cross-country skier) (born 1968), Swedish cross-country skier
- Anders Bergström (weightlifter) (born 1966), Swedish weightlifter
