= Algeria at the Mediterranean Games =

- IOC code: ALG
- NOC: Algerian Olympic Committee
- Medals Ranked 8th: Gold 99 Silver 84 Bronze 150 Total 333

Mediterranean Games appearances (overview)
- 1967; 1971; 1975; 1979; 1983; 1987; 1991; 1993; 1997; 2001; 2005; 2009; 2013; 2018; 2022; 2026

Algeria first participated in the Mediterranean Games at the 1967 edition in Tunis, Tunisia. Over the years, Algerian athletes have won a total of 333 medals at the Games, including 99 gold, 84 silver, and 150 bronze medals.

Algeria's best overall result came at the 2022 Mediterranean Games in Oran, where it finished fourth in the medal standings, its highest ranking in the history of the Games.

== Medal tables ==
=== Medals by Mediterranean Games ===
Host nation

Below the table representing all Algerian medals around the games. Till now, Algeria win 333 medals and 99 gold medals.

Games	Athletes	Gold	Silver	Bronze	Total	Rank	Notes
(Egypt) 1951 Alexandria	Part of France						
(Spain) 1955 Barcelona	Part of France						
(Lebanon) 1959 Beirut	Part of France						
(Italy) 1963 Naples	Did not participate						
(Tunisia) 1967 Tunis		0	0	3	3	9	details
(Turkey) 1971 İzmir	38	0	0	1	1	11	details
(Algeria) 1975 Algiers	314	4	7	9	20	8	details
(Socialist Federal Republic of Yugoslavia) 1979 Split	136	1	5	10	16	8	details
(Morocco) 1983 Casablanca	172	4	3	7	14	8	details
(Syria) 1987 Latakia	69	5	3	4	12	9	details
(Greece) 1991 Athens	102	9	3	5	17	7	details
(France) 1993 Languedoc-Roussillon	116	5	6	11	22	8	details
(Italy) 1997 Bari	135	6	8	8	22	6	details
(Tunisia) 2001 Tunis	155	10	10	12	32	7	details
(Spain) 2005 Almería	114	9	5	11	25	9	details
(Italy) 2009 Pescara	128	2	3	12	17	14	details
(Turkey) 2013 Mersin	171	9	2	15	26	10	details
(Spain) 2018 Tarragona	233	2	4	7	13	15	details
(Algeria) 2022 Oran	324	20	17	16	53	4	details
(Italy) 2026 Taranto	268	13	8	19	40	9	details
Total		99	84	150	333	8	–

== Medals by sport ==
Update to 2026 Mediterranean Games

Sport	Gold	Silver	Bronze	Total
Athletics	36	21	38	95
Boxing	22	22	28	72
Judo	8	8	27	43
Weightlifting	7	10	12	29
Karate	7	3	12	22
Swimming	7	3	6	16
Gymnastics	4	2	1	7
Wrestling	2	6	8	16
Football	2	1	1	4
Handball	1	1	2	4
Badminton	1	1	1	3
Fencing	1	1	1	3
Table tennis	1	1	0	2
Bocce	0	1	3	4
Boules	0	1	3	4
Tennis	0	1	2	3
Rowing	0	1	0	1
Cycling	0	0	3	3
3x3 basketball	0	0	1	1
Taekwondo	0	0	1	1
Totals (20 entries)	99	84	150	333

== Athletes with most medals ==
Salim Iles has won the most gold medals, while weightlifter Abdel Monaim Yahiaoui has won the most medals overall in the history of the Mediterranean Games.

Athlete	Sport	Games	Gold medal	Silver medal	Bronze medal	Total
Abdel Monaim Yahiaoui	Weightlifting	1991–1993–1997	3	3	2	8
Salim Iles	Swimming	1997–2001–2005	5	1	0	6
Hassiba Boulmerka	Athletics	1991–1993	3	1	0	4
Kaylia Nemour	Gymnastics	2026	3	0	1	4
Yasser Triki	Athletics	2018–2022–2026	2	1	1	4
Malik Louahla	Athletics	1997–2001–2005	2	1	0	3
Baya Rahouli	Athletics	2001–2005–2013	2	0	1	3
Othmane Belfaa	Athletics	1983–1987–1991	2	0	1	3
Sid Ali Ferdjani	Gymnastics	1997–2001–2005	1	2	0	3
Souad Aït Salem	Athletics	2005–2013	1	1	1	3
Jaouad Syoud	Swimming	2022	1	1	1	3
Koceila Mammeri	Badminton	2022–2026	1	1	1	3
Oussama Sahnoune	Swimming	2018–2022	1	1	1	3
Faris Touairi	Weightlifting	2022–2026	1	0	2	3
Kenza Dahmani	Athletics	2009–2013	1	0	2	3
Azzedine Basbas	Weightlifting	1993	0	0	3	3

Notes: in Khaki the athletes still in activity.

== Medal account by gender ==
#	Venue and Year	Men				Women				Mixed				Total			
#	Venue and Year	Gold medal	Silver medal	Bronze medal	Tot.	Gold medal	Silver medal	Bronze medal	Tot.	Gold medal	Silver medal	Bronze medal	Tot.	1st place, gold medalist(s)	2nd place, silver medalist(s)	3rd place, bronze medalist(s)	Tot.
1	(Egypt) Alexandria 1951	Part of France															
2	(Spain) Barcelona 1955	Part of France															
3	(Lebanon) Beirut 1959	Part of France															
4	(Italy) Naples 1963	Did not enter															
5	(Tunisia) Tunis 1967	0	0	1	1	0	0	2	2	0	0	0	0	0	0	3	3
6	(Turkey) İzmir 1971	0	0	1	1	0	0	0	0	0	0	0	0	0	0	1	1
7	(Algeria) Algiers 1975	4	7	9	20	0	0	0	0	0	0	0	0	4	7	9	20
8	(Socialist Federal Republic of Yugoslavia) Split 1979	1	5	9	15	0	0	1	1	0	0	0	0	1	5	10	16
9	(Morocco) Casablanca 1983	4	2	7	13	0	1	0	1	0	0	0	0	4	3	7	14
10	(Syria) Latakia 1987	4	3	3	10	1	0	1	2	0	0	0	0	5	3	4	12
11	(Greece) Athens 1991	7	3	5	15	2	0	0	2	0	0	0	0	9	3	5	17
12	(France) Narbonne 1993	4	5	11	20	1	1	0	2	0	0	0	0	5	6	11	22
13	(Italy) Bari 1997	5	7	7	19	1	1	1	3	0	0	0	0	6	8	8	22
14	(Tunisia) Tunis 2001	8	9	6	23	2	1	6	9	0	0	0	0	10	10	12	32
15	(Spain) Almeria 2005	5	3	10	18	4	2	1	7	0	0	0	0	9	5	11	25
16	(Italy) Pescara 2009	2	3	6	11	0	0	6	6	0	0	0	0	2	3	12	17
17	(Turkey) Mersin 2013	6	1	11	18	3	1	4	8	0	0	0	0	9	2	15	26
18	(Spain) Tarragona 2018	2	4	6	12	0	0	1	1	0	0	0	0	2	4	7	13
19	(Algeria) Oran 2022	13	14	11	38	7	3	5	15	0	0	0	0	20	17	16	53
20	(Italy) Taranto 2026	9	6	12	27	4	2	6	12	0	0	1	1	13	8	19	40
Total		74	72	115	261	25	12	34	71	0	0	1	1	99	84	150	333

== Mediterranean Games football tournaments ==
Mediterranean Games record
Year	Round	Position	Pld	W	D	L	GF	GA
(Egypt) 1951	Part of France							
(Spain) 1955	Part of France							
(Lebanon) 1959	Part of France							
(Italy) 1963	Did not enter							
(Tunisia) 1967	Group stage	6th	3	1	0	2	4	6
(Turkey) 1971	Did not qualify							
(Algeria) 1975^{1}	Gold	1st	6	6	0	0	14	3
(Socialist Federal Republic of Yugoslavia) 1979	Bronze	3rd	5	2	2	1	7	6
(Morocco) 1983	Group stage	6th	2	1	0	1	3	3
(Syria) 1987^{1}	Group stage	8th	3	0	0	3	1	7
(Greece) 1991	Group stage	8th	2	0	0	2	1	5
(France) 1993	Silver	2nd	4	2	1	1	6	4
(Italy) 1997	Group stage	8th	3	0	3	0	4	4
(Tunisia) 2001	Group stage	8th	2	0	0	2	3	7
(Spain) 2005	Quarter-finals	6th	3	1	1	1	3	4
(Italy) 2009	Did not qualify							
(Turkey) 2013	Did not qualify							
(Spain) 2018	Group stage	6th	3	1	0	2	3	5
(Algeria) 2022	Group stage	6th	3	1	0	2	3	5
(Italy) 2026	Gold	1st	5	4	1	0	10	3
Total	Gold Medal	13/20	44	19	8	17	62	62

- ^1 Algeria participated with the national B team in 1975 and 1987.
- Prior to the Athens 1991 campaign, the Football at the Mediterranean Games was open to full senior national teams.

== See also ==
- Algeria at the Olympics
- Algeria at the African Games
- Algeria at the Arab Games
- Algeria at the Islamic Solidarity Games
- Algeria at the Paralympics
