= Algeria at the 1993 Mediterranean Games =

- IOC code: ALG
- NOC: Algerian Olympic Committee

in Languedoc-Roussillon
- Competitors: 116
- Medals Ranked 8th: Gold 5 Silver 6 Bronze 11 Total 22

Mediterranean Games appearances (overview)
- 1967; 1971; 1975; 1979; 1983; 1987; 1991; 1993; 1997; 2001; 2005; 2009; 2013; 2018; 2022; 2026

Algeria (ALG) competed at the 1993 Mediterranean Games in Languedoc-Roussillon, France.

== Medal summary ==
=== Medal table ===
Medal	Name	Sport	Event
Gold	Noureddine Morceli	Athletics	Men's 1500 metres
Gold	Hassiba Boulmerka	Athletics	Women's 800 metres
Gold	Abdelhakim Harkat	Judo	Men's 65 kg
Gold	Abdel Monaim Yahiaoui	Weightlifting	Men's 70 kg (Clean & Jerk)
Gold	Abdel Monaim Yahiaoui	Weightlifting	Men's 70 kg (Total)
Silver	Aïssa Belaout	Athletics	Men's 5000 metres
Silver	Azzedine Brahmi	Athletics	Men's 3000 metres steeplechase
Silver	Hassiba Boulmerka	Athletics	Women's 1500 metres
Silver	Hocine Soltani	Boxing	Men's 60 kg
Silver	Men's football team: Faycal Bentalla Faycal Hamdaki Ahmed Chedeba Faycal Badji Aziz Benhamlat Mohamed Ait Abderrahmane Rezki Amrouche Hakim Amaouche Laid Khiat Nacer Zekri Sid Ahmed Zerrouki Fawzi Moussouni Nabil Boursas Mekki Merabet Nacer Gaid Lakhdar Adjali Lyamine Bougherara Ali Lezzoum	Football	Men's tournament
Silver	Abdel Monaim Yahiaoui	Weightlifting	Men's 70 kg (Snatch)
Bronze	Réda Abdenouz	Athletics	Men's 800 metres
Bronze	Lotfi Khaïda	Athletics	Men's Triple jump
Bronze	Fayçal Bousbiat	Judo	Men's 60 kg
Bronze	Meziane Dahmani	Judo	Men's 71 kg
Bronze	Mohamed Haioun	Boxing	Men's 48 kg
Bronze	Ahmed Dine	Boxing	Men's 75 kg
Bronze	Mohamed Benguesmia	Boxing	Men's 81 kg
Bronze	Reda Benkaddour	Karate	Men's 65 kg
Bronze	Azzedine Basbas	Weightlifting	Men's 64 kg (Snatch)
Bronze	Azzedine Basbas	Weightlifting	Men's 64 kg (Clean & Jerk)
Bronze	Azzedine Basbas	Weightlifting	Men's 64 kg (Total)

Medals by sport
Sport	1st place, gold medalist(s)	2nd place, silver medalist(s)	3rd place, bronze medalist(s)	Total
Athletics	2	3	2	7
Boxing	0	1	3	4
Football	0	1	0	1
Judo	1	0	2	3
Karate	0	0	1	1
Weightlifting	2	1	3	6
Total	5	6	11	22

Medals by gender
Gender	1st place, gold medalist(s)	2nd place, silver medalist(s)	3rd place, bronze medalist(s)	Total
Male	4	5	11	20
Female	1	1	0	2
Total	5	6	11	22
