= El-Bakh =

El-Bakh is a surname. Notable people with the surname include:

- Fares El-Bakh (born 1998), Qatari weightlifter
- Ibrahim El-Bakh (born 1961), Egyptian weightlifter
