= Kim Yeong-cheol =

- Hangul: 김영철
- RR: Gim Yeongcheol
- MR: Kim Yŏngch'ŏl

Kim Yeong-cheol or Kim Yŏng-ch'ŏl (Korean: 김영철) is a Korean name consisting of the family name Kim and the given name Yeong-cheol, and may also refer to:

- Kim Yong-chol (born 1946), North Korean general, politician
- Kim Yeong-cheol (actor) (born 1953), South Korean actor
- Kim Young-chul (comedian) (born 1974), South Korean comedian
- Kim Young-chul (footballer) (born 1976), South Korean footballer
- Kim Yong-chol (weightlifter), North Korean weightlifter
