= Algeria at the 1987 Mediterranean Games =

- IOC code: ALG
- NOC: Algerian Olympic Committee

in Latakia
- Competitors: 69
- Medals Ranked 9th: Gold 5 Silver 3 Bronze 4 Total 12

Mediterranean Games appearances (overview)
- 1967; 1971; 1975; 1979; 1983; 1987; 1991; 1993; 1997; 2001; 2005; 2009; 2013; 2018; 2022

Algeria (ALG) competed at the 1987 Mediterranean Games in Latakia, Syria.

== Medal summary ==
=== Medal table ===
Medal	Name	Sport	Event
Gold	Nacèra Zaaboub	Athletics	Women's Heptathlon
Gold	Noureddine Meziane	Boxing	Men's Light Middleweight
Gold	Mohamed Bouchiche	Boxing	Men's Heavyweight
Gold	Meziane Dahmani	Judo	Men's 65 kg
Gold	Algeria men's national handball team	Handball	Men's tournament
Silver	Azzedine Saïd	Boxing	Men's Featherweight
Silver	Ahmed Dine	Boxing	Men's Middleweight
Silver	Mustapha Kamel Selmi	Athletics	Men's 200 metres
Bronze	Mustapha Kamel Selmi	Athletics	Men's 100 metres
Bronze	Othmane Belfaa	Athletics	Men's Long jump
Bronze	Nacèra Zaaboub	Athletics	Women's 100 metres hurdles
Bronze	Abdel Hakim Harkat	Judo	Men's 60 kg

Medals by sport
Sport	1st place, gold medalist(s)	2nd place, silver medalist(s)	3rd place, bronze medalist(s)	Total
Athletics	1	1	3	5
Boxing	2	2	0	4
Handball	1	0	0	1
Judo	1	0	1	2
Total	5	3	4	12

Medals by gender
Gender	1st place, gold medalist(s)	2nd place, silver medalist(s)	3rd place, bronze medalist(s)	Total
Male	4	3	3	10
Female	1	0	1	2
Total	5	3	4	12
