= Sakuma =

Sakuma (written: 佐久間) is a Japanese surname. Notable people with the surname include:

- Akira Sakuma (佐久間 晃, born 1952), Japanese video game designer
- Chie Sakuma (佐久間 千絵, born 1972), Japanese-American retired ice hockey player
- Daisuke Sakuma (佐久間 大介, born 1992), Japanese idol, tarento, actor, member of boy band Snow Man
- Hanzō Sakuma (佐久間 範造, 1844–1897), Japanese photographer
- Katsuhiko Sakuma (佐久間 勝彦, born 1970), Japanese weightlifter
- Kumi Sakuma (佐久間 紅美, born 1976), Japanese voice actress
- Morimasa Sakuma (佐久間 盛政, 1554-1583), prominent Oda retainer, cousin of Nobumori Sakuma
- Morishige Sakuma (佐久間 盛重, died 1560), Japanese samurai who served Oda Nobunaga
- Nobumori Sakuma (佐久間 信盛, 1528–1582), retainer of the Oda clan, cousin of Morimasa Sakuma
- Rei Sakuma (佐久間 レイ, born 1965), Japanese actress, voice actress, singer, narrator
- Rio Sakuma (佐久間 理央, born 1997), Japanese professional footballer
- Roy Sakuma (born 1948), Hawaiian ukulele teacher and founder of the Ukulele Festival
- Samata Sakuma (佐久間 左馬太, 1844–1915), Imperial Japanese Army general
- Satoru Sakuma (佐久間 悟, born 1963), Japanese former football player and manager
- Shōzan Sakuma (佐久間 象山, 1811–1864), Japanese politician and scholar of the Edo period
- Tatsuya Sakuma (佐久間 達也, born 1974), Japanese former professional drifting driver
- Tsutomu Sakuma (佐久間 勉, 1879–1910), Imperial Japanese Navy career naval officer
- Yoshiko Sakuma (佐久間 良子, born 1939), Japanese actress
- Yui Sakuma (佐久間 由衣, born 1995), Japanese actress and model

Fictional characters

- Ryuichi Sakuma, a character in the anime and manga series Gravitation
- Kotaro Sakuma, a character in the Uchu Sentai Kyuranger
- Sakuma Kichiro, a character in Age of Empires III: The Asian Dynasties campaign and main protagonist of the Japanese campaign
- Sakuya Sakuma (佐久間 咲也), a character in A3!
- Sakuma Rei and Sakuma Ritsu from Ensemble Stars!

== See also ==
- 6809 Sakuma, asteroid
- Sakuma Dam
- Sakuma HVDC Back-to-Back Station
- Sakuma drops, a brand for hard candies
- Sakuma, Shizuoka, a town
