= Algeria at the 2009 Mediterranean Games =

- IOC code: ALG
- NOC: Algerian Olympic Committee

in Pescara
- Competitors: 128 in 14 sports
- Medals Ranked 14th: Gold 2 Silver 3 Bronze 12 Total 17

Mediterranean Games appearances (overview)
- 1967; 1971; 1975; 1979; 1983; 1987; 1991; 1993; 1997; 2001; 2005; 2009; 2013; 2018; 2022; 2026

Algeria competed at the 2009 Mediterranean Games in Pescara, Italy. 98 men and 30 women representing 128 competitors participated at this edition.

== Medal summary ==
=== Medal table ===
Medal	Name	Sport	Event
Gold	Antar Zerguelaine	Athletics	Men's 1500 metres
Gold	Rachid Hamani	Boxing	Men's middleweight
Silver	Khaled Zobeidi	Bocce	Men's progressive throw
Silver	Abdelhalim Ouradi	Boxing	Men's bantamweight
Silver	Abdelhafid Benchabla	Boxing	Men's light heavyweight
Bronze	Kenza Dahmani	Athletics	Women's 10,000 metres
Bronze	Kenza Dahmani	Athletics	Women's Half marathon
Bronze	Amar Benikhlef	Judo	Men's 100 kg
Bronze	Lyes Bouyacoub	Judo	Men's 90 kg
Bronze	Lila Latrous	Judo	Women's 57 kg
Bronze	Kahina Saidi	Judo	Women's 63 kg
Bronze	Rachida Ouerdane	Judo	Women's 78 kg
Bronze	Ilhem El Djou	Karate	Women's Kumite −55 kg
Bronze	Nabil Kebbab	Swimming	Men's 100 m freestyle
Bronze	Abdelkrim Makhloufi	Bocce	Men's precision throw
Bronze	Samir Brahimi	Boxing	Men's flyweight
Bronze	Mohamed Amine Ouadahi	Boxing	Men's lightweight

Medals by sport
Sport	1st place, gold medalist(s)	2nd place, silver medalist(s)	3rd place, bronze medalist(s)	Total
Athletics	1	0	2	3
Bocce	0	1	1	2
Boxing	1	2	2	5
Judo	0	0	5	5
Karate	0	0	1	1
Swimming	0	0	1	1
Total	2	3	12	17

Medals by gender
Gender	1st place, gold medalist(s)	2nd place, silver medalist(s)	3rd place, bronze medalist(s)	Total
Male	2	3	6	11
Female	0	0	6	6
Total	2	3	12	17

== Weightlifting ==
Men

Athlete	Event	Snatch		Clean & Jerk	
Athlete	Event	Result	Rank	Result	Rank
El-Habib Lariki	56 kg	95	8	125	7
