= Algeria at the 1979 Mediterranean Games =

- IOC code: ALG
- NOC: Algerian Olympic Committee

in Split
- Competitors: 136
- Medals Ranked 8th: Gold 1 Silver 5 Bronze 10 Total 16

Mediterranean Games appearances (overview)
- 1967; 1971; 1975; 1979; 1983; 1987; 1991; 1993; 1997; 2001; 2005; 2009; 2013; 2018; 2022

Algeria (ALG) competed at the 1979 Mediterranean Games in Split, Yugoslavia.

== Medal summary ==
=== Medal table ===
Medal	Name	Sport	Event
Gold	Abdelmadjid Mada	Athletics	Men's 10,000 metres
Silver	Abderrahmane Morceli	Athletics	Men's 800 metres
Silver	Rachid Habchaoui	Athletics	Men's 5000 metres
Silver	Djillali Rahou	Boxing	Men's Light Welterweight
Silver	Tahar Hamou	Fencing	Men's foil
Silver	Mohamed Gouni	Weightlifting	Men's 60 kg
Bronze	Abderrahmane Morceli	Athletics	Men's 1500 metres
Bronze	El Hachemi Abdenouz	Athletics	Men's 5000 metres
Bronze	Rachid Habchaoui	Athletics	Men's 10,000 metres
Bronze	Sakina Boutamine	Athletics	Women's 1500 metres
Bronze	Algeria national football team	Football	Men's tournament
Bronze	Abdelkader Bouksiba	Boxing	Men's Light Flyweight
Bronze	Elhani Bouksiba	Boxing	Men's Flyweight
Bronze	Kamel Abboud	Boxing	Men's Lightweight
Bronze	Ahmed Moussa	Judo	Men's 60 kg
Bronze	Djamel Benaceur	Wrestling	Men's 62 kg

Medals by sport
Sport	1st place, gold medalist(s)	2nd place, silver medalist(s)	3rd place, bronze medalist(s)	Total
Athletics	1	2	4	7
Boxing	0	1	3	4
Fencing	0	1	0	1
Football	0	0	1	1
Judo	0	0	1	1
Weightlifting	0	1	0	1
Wrestling	0	0	1	1
Total	1	5	10	16

Medals by gender
Gender	1st place, gold medalist(s)	2nd place, silver medalist(s)	3rd place, bronze medalist(s)	Total
Male	1	5	9	15
Female	0	0	1	1
Total	1	5	10	16
