= Algeria at the 1967 Mediterranean Games =

- IOC code: ALG
- NOC: Algerian Olympic Committee

in Tunis
- Medals Ranked 9th: Gold 0 Silver 0 Bronze 3 Total 3

Mediterranean Games appearances (overview)
- 1967; 1971; 1975; 1979; 1983; 1987; 1991; 1993; 1997; 2001; 2005; 2009; 2013; 2018; 2022

Algeria (ALG) competed at the 1967 Mediterranean Games in Tunis, Tunisia.

== Medal summary ==
=== Medal table ===
Medal	Name	Sport	Event
Bronze	Rabea Ghezlane	Athletics	Women's Shot put
Bronze	Rabea Ghezlane	Athletics	Women's Javelin throw
Bronze	Kaddour	Boxing	Men's Heavyweight

Medals by sport
Sport	1st place, gold medalist(s)	2nd place, silver medalist(s)	3rd place, bronze medalist(s)	Total
Athletics	0	0	2	2
Boxing	0	0	1	1
Total	0	0	3	3

Medals by gender
Gender	1st place, gold medalist(s)	2nd place, silver medalist(s)	3rd place, bronze medalist(s)	Total
Male	0	0	1	1
Female	0	0	2	2
Total	0	0	3	3
