= Mohamed Salah Mentouri =

Algerian politician (1940–2010)

Mohamed Salah Mentouri (9 April 1940 – 5 September 2010) was an Algerian politician who served as Minister of Labor and Social Affairs from 18 June 1991 to 16 October 1991, and then as Minister of Health and Social Affairs from 16 October 1991 to 22 February 1992. Furthermore, he presided over the Algerian Olympic Committee for two separate terms (1984–1988 and 1989–1993).
