= Weightlifting at the 1992 Summer Olympics – Men's 82.5 kg =

Weightlifting at the Olympics

Men's 82.5 kg at the Games of the XXV Olympiad
- Venue: Pavelló de l'Espanya Industrial
- Date: 31 July 1992
- Competitors: 31 from 25 nations
- Winning total: 370.0 kg

Medalists
1st place, gold medalist(s)		Pyrros Dimas	Greece
2nd place, silver medalist(s)		Krzysztof Siemion	Poland
3rd place, bronze medalist(s)		not awarded	

The Men's Light-heavyweight Weightlifting Event (– 82.5 kg) is the fifth-heaviest men's event at the weightlifting competition, limiting competitors to a maximum of 82.5 kilograms of body mass. The competition took place on 31 July in the Pavelló de l'Espanya Industrial.

Each lifter performed in both the snatch and clean and jerk lifts, with the final score being the sum of the lifter's best result in each. The athlete received three attempts in each of the two lifts; the score for the lift was the heaviest weight successfully lifted. Ties were broken by the lifter with the lightest body weight.

In this case additional criteria were applied – Dimas won the gold medal as he was the first to reach the winning total of 370 kg (he did it in his first attempt of clean & jerk).

== Results ==
Rank	Name	Body Weight	Snatch (kg)			Clean & Jerk (kg)			Total (kg)
Rank	Name	Body Weight	1	2	3	1	2	3	Total (kg)
1st place, gold medalist(s)	Pyrros Dimas (GRE)	81.80	162.5	~~167.5~~	167.5	202.5	~~207.5~~	~~207.5~~	370.0
2nd place, silver medalist(s)	Krzysztof Siemion (POL)	81.80	160.0	165.0	~~167.5~~	200.0	205.0	~~207.5~~	370.0
4	Chon Chol-ho (PRK)	78.60	~~160.0~~	160.0	165.0	200.0	~~207.5~~	~~207.5~~	365.0
5	Plamen Bratoychev (BUL)	81.85	162.5	~~167.5~~	167.5	197.5	~~202.5~~	~~202.5~~	365.0
6	Lino Elias (CUB)	82.40	~~160.0~~	160.0	~~165.0~~	~~197.5~~	202.5	205.0	365.0
7	Marc Huster (GER)	80.90	160.0	165.0	~~165.0~~	195.0	~~202.5~~	202.5	362.5
8	José Heredia (CUB)	82.45	160.0	165.0	-	197.5	~~202.5~~	~~202.5~~	362.5
9	Li Yunnan (CHN)	81.70	160.0	~~165.0~~	~~165.0~~	~~195.0~~	195.0	~~200.0~~	355.0
10	Andrzej Cofalik (POL)	80.45	~~160.0~~	160.0	~~165.0~~	190.0	~~195.0~~	~~195.0~~	350.0
11	Cai Yanshu (CHN)	80.60	157.5	~~162.5~~	~~162.5~~	~~192.5~~	192.5	~~197.5~~	350.0
12	Saleh Khadim (IRQ)	82.30	155.0	~~160.0~~	160.0	190.0	~~195.0~~	~~195.0~~	350.0
13	Sunay Bulut (TUR)	82.30	150.0	155.0	~~162.5~~	~~192.5~~	192.5	~~197.5~~	347.5
14	László Barsi (HUN)	81.00	160.0	~~165.0~~	~~165.0~~	185.0	~~190.0~~	~~190.0~~	345.0
15	Dave Morgan (GBR)	81.50	~~155.0~~	155.0	160.0	185.0	~~195.0~~	~~195.0~~	345.0
16	Julio César Luña (VEN)	82.35	147.5	152.5	~~155.0~~	185.0	190.0	~~195.0~~	342.5
17	Tony Urrutia (USA)	81.95	145.0	150.0	~~152.5~~	185.0	190.0	~~195.0~~	340.0
18	István Mészáros (HUN)	81.95	~~152.5~~	152.5	~~157.5~~	182.5	~~190.0~~	~~190.0~~	335.0
19	René Durbák (TCH)	81.95	140.0	145.0	147.5	177.5	~~182.5~~	182.5	330.0
20	Andrew Callard (GBR)	82.10	137.5	~~142.5~~	142.5	177.5	182.5	~~187.5~~	325.0
21	Stéphane Sageder (FRA)	81.65	~~140.0~~	~~140.0~~	140.0	182.5	~~187.5~~	~~187.5~~	322.5
22	Juan Carlos (ESP)	82.25	140.0	~~145.0~~	~~145.0~~	180.0	~~185.0~~	~~190.0~~	320.0
23	Ali Reza Azari (IRI)	82.30	135.0	140.0	~~142.5~~	165.0	175.0	~~180.0~~	315.0
24	Alphonse Hercule Matam (CMR)	81.55	137.5	~~142.5~~	~~142.5~~	170.0	~~175.0~~	~~175.0~~	307.5
25	Prasert Sumpradit (THA)	76.40	~~130.0~~	132.5	~~137.5~~	165.0	~~170.0~~	~~170.0~~	297.5
26	Sergio Lafuente (URU)	81.45	~~127.5~~	127.5	~~135.0~~	152.5	~~160.0~~	~~160.0~~	280.0
27	Pieter Smith (RSA)	82.00	115.0	120.0	~~125.0~~	145.0	150.0	~~155.0~~	270.0
-	Arnold Franqui (PUR)	76.90	130.0	135.0	~~137.5~~	~~160.0~~	~~160.0~~	~~160.0~~	DNF
-	Ryoji Isaoka (JPN)	81.50	~~155.0~~	155.0	~~160.0~~	~~195.0~~	~~195.0~~	~~195.0~~	DNF
-	Ibragim Samadov (EUN)	81.85	162.5	167.5	~~170.0~~	202.5	~~207.5~~	~~207.5~~	DQ [370.0]
-	Yeom Dong-cheol (KOR)	82.25	~~150.0~~	~~150.0~~	~~150.0~~	-	-	-	DNF
