= Oleg Sadikhov =

Israeli weightlifter

Personal information
- Native name: אולג סדיחוב
- Born: April 4, 1966 (age 60) Donetsk, Russia

Sport
- Country: Israel
- Sport: Weightlifting
- Weight class: Men's Middleweight (75 kg)

Oleg Sadikhov (Hebrew: אולג סדיחוב; also "Sadikov" and "Sodichov"; born April 4, 1966), is an Israeli former Olympic weightlifter.

== Early life ==
Sadikhov was born in Donetsk, Russia, and is Jewish. He made aliyah to Israel in 1991.

== Weightlifting career ==
In 1986, Sadikhov won the silver medal at the World Youth Championships in weightlifting, in the 75 kg category.

In the 1991 World Championships in Donaueschingen, Germany, Sadikhov came in 10th, after lifting 317.5 kg.

Sadikhov won the bronze medal at the 1992 European Championships in Szekszárd, Hungary, in the Middleweight class (lifting 342.5 kg).

Competing for Israel at the 1992 Summer Olympics in Barcelona at the age of 26 in Weightlifting--Men's Middleweight (75 kg), Sadikhov came in 10th, after lifting 332.5 kg. When he competed in the Olympics, he weighed 163 lbs (74 kg).
