= Aurel Sîrbu =

Romanian weightlifter

Personal information
- Nationality: Romanian
- Born: 25 January 1971 (age 54); Cluj-Napoca, Romania

Sport
- Sport: Weightlifting

Aurel Sîrbu (born 25 January 1971) is a Romanian weightlifter. He competed in the men's bantamweight event at the 1992 Summer Olympics.
