= Umar Edelkhanov =

Russian weightlifter

Personal information
- Nationality: Russian
- Born: 29 December 1963 (age 61); Terskoye, Chechnya, Russia

Sport
- Sport: Weightlifting

Umar Edelkhanov (Russian: Умар Эдельханов; born 29 December 1963) is a Russian weightlifter. He competed in the men's featherweight event at the 1996 Summer Olympics.
