= Lin Tzu-yao =

Taiwanese weightlifter

Personal information
- Nationality: Taiwanese
- Born: 25 October 1967 (age 57)

Sport
- Sport: Weightlifting

Lin Tzu-yao (born 25 October 1967) is a Taiwanese weightlifter. He competed in the men's bantamweight event at the 1992 Summer Olympics.
