= Nogir =

Nogir Ногир
- Selo
- Interactive map of Nogir
- Coordinates: 43°04′51″N 44°38′14″E
- Country: Russia
- Federal subject: North Ossetia–Alania
- District: Prigorodny
- Founded: 1921
- Elevation: 623 m (2,044 ft)

Population
  - Total: 11,870
- Time zone: UTC+3 (MSK)

Nogir (Iron Ossetic: Ногир) is a village in the Prigorodny District of the Republic of North Ossetia-Alania, Russia. It serves as the administrative center of the Nogir rural settlement.

== Geography ==
Nogir is located in the northern part of Prigorodny District, on the left bank of the Terek River, and is effectively connected to the northern outskirts of Vladikavkaz.

The village borders the following settlements: Vladikavkaz to the south, Alkhachurt to the north, Mikhaylovskoye to the northeast, and Zavodskoy to the east.

== Etymology ==
The name "Nogir" translates from the Ossetian language as "New Ossetia" (Ossetian: Ног Ир).

== History ==
Before the October Revolution, the site of Nogir was used as a military training ground by the Russian Empire.

Modern Nogir was founded in 1921 by refugees from South Ossetia, who had previously settled in the village of Khristianovskoye (now Digora).

The first school in the village was built in the late 1930s.

In the spring of 1992, the Republic's authorities began constructing the Santa Barbara microdistrict in the southwestern outskirts of Nogir to house refugees from South Ossetia and Georgia. The microdistrict now consists of 221 houses.

During the 1992 Ossetian–Ingush conflict, no military operations took place in Nogir, but the village temporarily lost gas, electricity, and water supply.

== Population ==
The population of Nogir consists mainly of Ossetians. Before the village was established in 1921, Ossetians living there had previously resided in various valleys of central and southern Ossetia. According to the 2010 Russian Census, the ethnic composition of the village was as follows:

- 96.1% Ossetians
- 1.6% Russians
- 2.3% Others

== Archaeology ==
In Nogir, an ancient kurgan burial site from the early Bronze Age (approximately 4,000 years old), belonging to the Maykop culture, is located in the village's main street, covering an area of 1,000 m^{2}.

== Monuments ==
- "Eternal Flame" memorial complex
- "Guardian Lion" at the village entrance
- Statue of three-time Olympic champion Artur Taymazov
- Statue of two-time Olympic and world champion Timur Taymazov
- Statue of three-time world and Olympic champion Elbrus Tedeyev
- Statue of Joseph Stalin (Dzukata)
- "Two Pioneers" monument at the first school entrance
- Statue of Olympic champion Alan Khugayev
