= Pieter Smith (weightlifter) =

South African weightlifter

Personal information
- Nationality: South African
- Born: 8 December 1963 (age 61)

Sport
- Sport: Weightlifting

Pieter Smith (born 8 December 1963) is a South African weightlifter. He competed in the men's light heavyweight event at the 1992 Summer Olympics.
