= Oscar Loya =

American singer

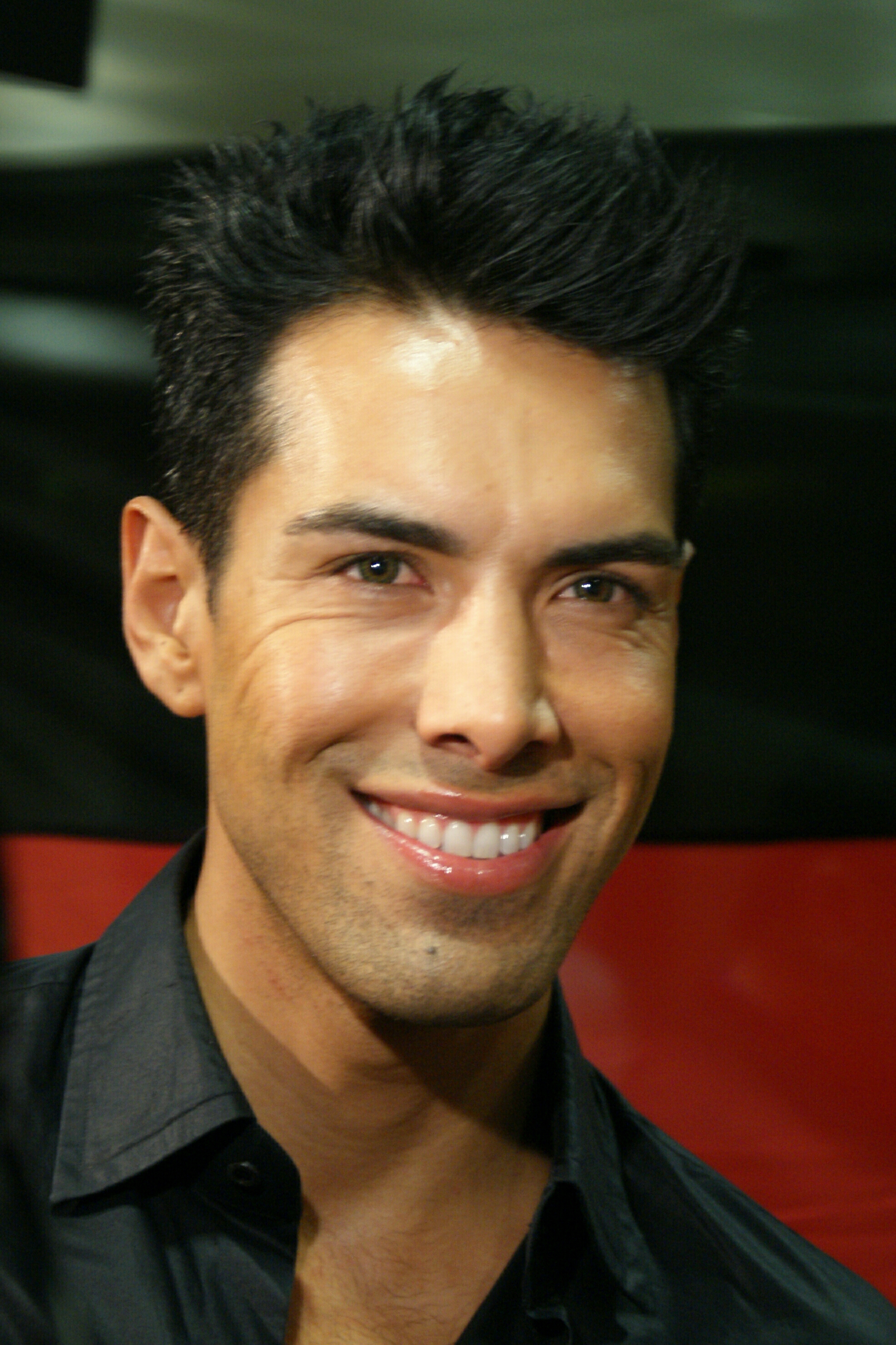
Loya in 2009

Joseph Oscar Loya (born June 12, 1979) is an American singer and Broadway musical theatre performer.

== Biography ==
Loya was born in 1979 in Indio, California and grew up as the youngest of five children in California. He is openly gay and lives in Munich, Germany.

Loya represented Germany at the final of the Eurovision Song Contest 2009 in Moscow, Russia together with Alex Christensen as Alex swings Oscar sings, performing the song "Miss Kiss Kiss Bang", with special guest Dita Von Teese performing with them in the Final. The song finished 20th in a final of 25 competing countries.

Loya released his debut album in 2009. His voice coach is Professor Dennis M. Heath (Munich). Heath teaches other successful professional artists in Europe, Australia, and the United States.

Loya concentrates on his solo career and released his second album "Beast" in 2011. "Beast" is a collaboration between Oscar and the electropop producer Alek Sandar. The self-written and co-produced single "Learn Something New" with Citrusonic Records has been published in December 2012.

From October 2012 to June 2013, Loya has been the principal character in the revue SHOW ME at the Friedrichstadt-Palast in Berlin.

== Discography ==
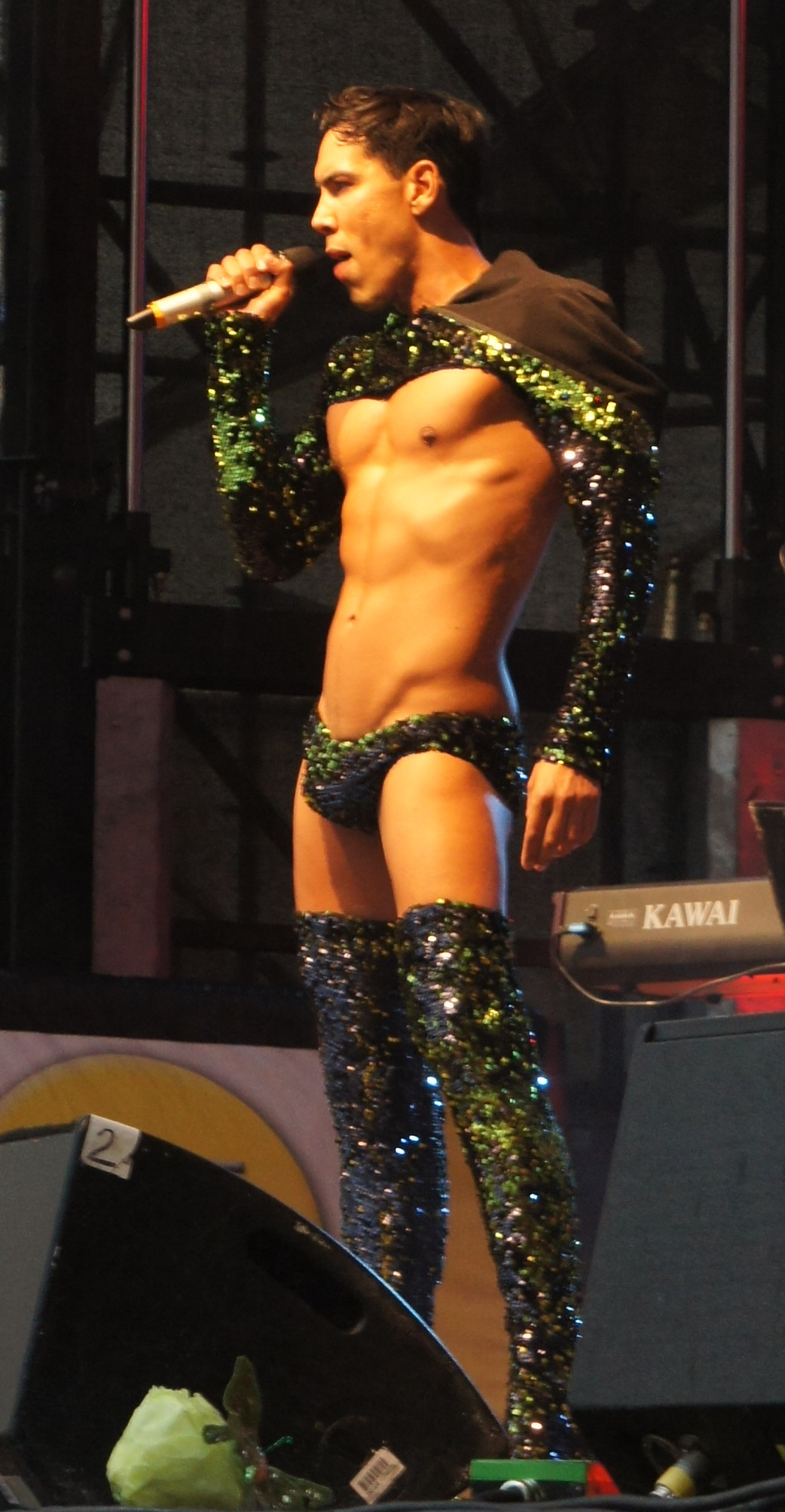
Loya performing in 2011

=== Singles ===
Year	Single	Chart positions					Album
Year	Single	GER	AUT	SWE	UK	TUR	Album
2009	"Miss Kiss Kiss Bang"	20	71	35	85	40	Heart 4 Sale

=== Studio albums ===
Year	Information	Chart positions
Year	Information	PL
2009	Heart 4 Sale: Debut studio album; Released: 2009	88

Preceded by No Angels with Disappear	Germany in the Eurovision Song Contest; 2009 (with Alex)	Succeeded by Lena with Satellite
