= Badminton at the Mediterranean Games =

Badminton competition

Badminton is one of the sports at the quadrennial Mediterranean Games. It has been a sport in the program of Mediterranean Games since the event's seventeenth edition.

== Editions ==
Games	Year	Host city	Host country	Events	Best nation
XVII	2013	Mersin	Turkey	4	Turkey (TUR)
XVIII	2018	Tarragona	Spain	4	France (FRA)
XIX	2022	Oran	Algeria	4	Turkey (TUR)
XX	2026	Taranto	Italy	5	Turkey (TUR)

=== All-time medal table ===
Rank	Nation	Gold	Silver	Bronze	Total
1	Turkey (TUR)	9	4	3	16
2	France (FRA)	3	4	5	12
3	Spain (ESP)	2	5	2	9
4	Italy (ITA)	1	2	3	6
5	Algeria (ALG)	1	1	1	3
5	Croatia (CRO)	1	1	1	3
7	Slovenia (SLO)	0	0	5	5
8	Greece (GRE)	0	0	2	2
8	Serbia (SRB)	0	0	2	2
10	Cyprus (CYP)	0	0	1	1
10	Egypt (EGY)	0	0	1	1
Totals (11 entries)		17	17	26	60
