= Mohamed Zerguini =

Algerian politician (1922–2001)

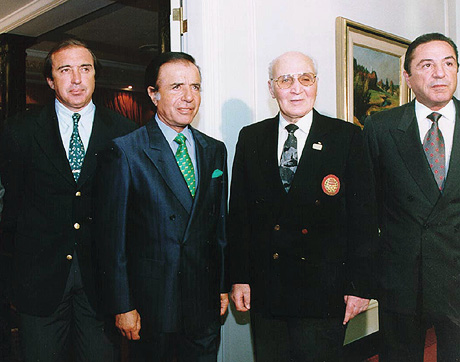
Zerguini is the second person from the right

Mohamed Zerguini (Arabic: محمد زرقيني, 30 January 1922 – 21 June 2001) was an Algerian politician. He served as president of the Algerian Olympic Committee from 1968 to 1983, and in 1974 he became a member of the International Olympic Committee. He was also the Minister of Post and Telecommunications from 23 April 1977 to 15 July 1980, in the Boumédiène IV and Abdelghani I governments.
