= Tibor Karczag =

Hungarian weightlifter

Personal information
- Nationality: Hungarian
- Born: Tibor Karczag; 9 September 1967 (age 58) Győr, Hungary

Sport
- Country: Hungary
- Sport: Weightlifting
- Event: –54kg
- Club: Tatabányai Bányász Sport Club

Tibor Karczag (born 9 September 1967 in Győr) is a Hungarian weightlifter. He competed in the Olympic Games in 1992 and 1996. In Barcelona (1992) finished 6th place in 56 kg category. Four years later, in Atlanta he missed all of his 107.5 kg snatch attempt and did not finish the competition in the 54 kg category.

== Major results ==
Year	Venue	Weight	Snatch (kg)					Clean & Jerk (kg)					Total	Rank
Year	Venue	Weight	1	2	3	Result	Rank	1	2	3	Result	Rank	Total	Rank
Representing Hungary
Olympic Games
1996	Atlanta, United States	54 kg	~~107.5~~	~~107.5~~	~~107.5~~	—	—	—	—	—	—	—	—	—
1992	Barcelona, Spain	56 kg	112.5	115.0	~~117.5~~	115.0	5	140.0	—	—	140.0	6	255.0	6
World Championships
1995	Guangzhou, China	54 kg	—N/a	—N/a	—N/a	102.5	16	—N/a	—N/a	—N/a	132.5	14	235.0	14
1993	Melbourne, Australia	59 kg	—N/a	—N/a	—N/a	115.0	16	—N/a	—N/a	—N/a	145.0	12	260.0	16
European Championships
1996	Stavanger, Norway	54 kg	105.0	107.5	~~110.0~~	107.5	7	130.0	132.5	~~137.5~~	132.5	9	240.0	8
1993	Sofia, Bulgaria	59 kg	—N/a	—N/a	—N/a	117.5	8	—N/a	—N/a	—N/a	145.0	11	262.5	10
1992	Szekszárd, Hungary	56 kg	—N/a	—N/a	—N/a	110.0	8	—N/a	—N/a	—N/a	135.0	7	245.0	6
1991	Władysławowo, Poland	56 kg	—N/a	—N/a	—N/a	107.5	8	—N/a	—N/a	—N/a	132.5	9	240.0	8
