= Ferenc Lénárt =

Hungarian weightlifter (1964–2025)

Personal information
- Nationality: Hungarian
- Born: 23 November 1964 Pápa, Hungary
- Died: 14 September 2025 (aged 60)

Sport
- Sport: Weightlifting

Ferenc Lénárt (23 November 1964 – 14 September 2025) was a Hungarian weightlifter. He competed in the men's bantamweight event at the 1992 Summer Olympics. Lénárt died on 14 September 2025, at the age of 60.
