= Alireza Azari =

Iranian weightlifter

Personal information
- Full name: Alireza Azari Arpanahi
- Nationality: Iranian
- Born: 12 June 1968 (age 56); Masjed Soleyman, Iran

Sport
- Sport: Weightlifting

Alireza Azari Arpanahi (Persian: علیرضا آذری آرپناهی, born 12 June 1968) is an Iranian weightlifter. He competed in the men's light heavyweight event at the 1992 Summer Olympics.
