= René Durbák =

Czech weightlifter

Personal information
- Nationality: Czech
- Born: 18 March 1968 (age 57); Třinec, Czechoslovakia

Sport
- Sport: Weightlifting

René Durbák (born 18 March 1968) is a Czech weightlifter. He competed in the men's light heavyweight event at the 1992 Summer Olympics.
