= Boxing at the 1975 Mediterranean Games =

Boxing competition

- Location: Algiers, Algeria
- Dates: 26 August – 6 September 1975

The boxing events of the 1975 Mediterranean Games were held in Algiers, Algeria.

== Medalists ==
Event	Gold	Silver	Bronze
Light Flyweight (–48 kg)	Enrique Rodríguez (ESP)	Ahmed Saïd (ALG)	Mbarek Zarrogui (MAR) Labib Kheer (EGY)
Flyweight (–51 kg)	Said Ahmed (EGY)	Arturo Menciasi (ITA)	Andreas Strembelias (GRE) Mahieddine Battache (ALG)
Bantamweight (–54 kg)	Adem Ašanović (YUG)	Mohamed Alik (ALG)	Romano Mugnai (ITA) Abdelnabi el-Sayed Mahran (EGY)
Featherweight (–57 kg)	Hocine Nini (ALG)	Bernardo Ciaramella (ITA)	Mohamed Salah Amin (EGY) Nizar Eraj (SYR)
Lightweight (–60 kg)	Bechir Jilassi (TUN)	Mihridžan Turčinović (YUG)	Rashad Abdelgaffar Zaki (EGY) Angelo Provenzano (ITA)
Light Welterweight (–63.5 kg)	Milenko Rubelj (YUG)	Jose Canet Gomez (ESP)	Georgios Agrimanakis (GRE) Mahmoud Rafaa (EGY)
Welterweight (–67 kg)	Luigi Minchillo (ITA)	Živorad Jelisijević (YUG)	Athanasios Iliadis (GRE) El-Brehs (EGY)
Light Middleweight (–71 kg)	Matteo Salvemini (ITA)	Ben Ali Guechmi (ALG)	Svetomir Belić (YUG) Lehman (SYR)
Middleweight (–75 kg)	Mohamed Missouri (ALG)	Khalil Ali Khalti (EGY)	Ahmed Zarkati (MAR) Mohamed Zahara (SYR)
Light Heavyweight (–81 kg)	Amine Ghonem Ahmed (EGY)	Mohamed Saoud (MAR)	Sante Bucari (ITA); Ayek (SYR)
Heavyweight (+81 kg)	Rinaldo Pelizzari (ITA)	Abdellatif Fatihi (MAR)	Mohamed Galoul (ALG) Ibrahim Talaat (EGY)

== Medal table ==
Rank	Nation	Gold	Silver	Bronze	Total
1	Italy (ITA)	3	2	3	8
2	Algeria (ALG)	2	3	2	7
3	Yugoslavia (YUG)	2	2	1	5
4	Egypt (EGY)	2	1	7	10
5	Spain (ESP)	1	1	0	2
6	Tunisia (TUN)	1	0	0	1
7	Morocco (MAR)	0	2	2	4
8	Syria (SYR)	0	0	4	4
9	Greece (GRE)	0	0	3	3
Totals (9 entries)		11	11	22	44
