= Katsuhisa Nitta =

Japanese weightlifter

Personal information
- Nationality: Japanese
- Born: 25 April 1968 (age 56); Hiroshima, Japan

Sport
- Sport: Weightlifting

Katsuhisa Nitta (born 25 April 1968) is a Japanese weightlifter. He competed in the men's bantamweight event at the 1992 Summer Olympics.
