= Luo Jianming =

Chinese weightlifter

Medal record

Representing China

Men's Olympic weightlifting

Olympic Games
| Bronze medal – third place | 1992 Barcelona | 52-56 kg |

Luo Jianming (Chinese: 罗建明; born 6 November 1969) is a male Chinese weightlifter. He competed at the 1992 Barcelona Olympics, and won a bronze medal in men's 52–56 kg.
