= Arnold Franqui =

Puerto Rican weightlifter

Personal information
- Nationality: Puerto Rican
- Born: 10 January 1963 (age 62); Haiti

Sport
- Sport: Weightlifting

Arnold Franqui (born 10 January 1963) is a Puerto Rican weightlifter. He competed in the men's light heavyweight event at the 1992 Summer Olympics.
