= Muharrem Süleymanoğlu =

Turkish weightlifter (born 1969)

Personal information
- Nationality: Turkey
- Born: 18 September 1969 (age 57) Ptichar, Kardzhali Province, Bulgaria
- Weight: 75 kg (165 lb)

Sport
- Sport: Weightlifting
- Weight class: 75 kg
Medal record
Men's weightlifting
Representing Turkey
Mediterranean Games
Gold medal – first place	1991 Athens	75 kg S
Bronze medal – third place	1991 Athens	75 kg C
Silver medal – second place	1991 Athens	75 kg T

Muharrem Süleymanoğlu (born 18 September 1969) is a Turkish weightlifter who competed in the 75 kg weight category. He represented Turkey at the 1992 Summer Olympics in Barcelona. He is the younger brother of the three-time Olympic champion Naim Süleymanoğlu.

== Biography ==
Muharrem Süleymanoğlu began weightlifting in 1978, inspired by his older brother. He initially competed for the Bulgarian junior national team before switching his sporting nationality to Turkish, following in his brother’s footsteps. After retiring from active competition, he became a coach and served as the head coach of the Turkish men’s national weightlifting team.

He is also the author of the book My Brother, the Pocket Hercules. In 2019, a biographical film titled *Pocket Hercules: Naim Süleymanoğlu* (Cep Herkülü: Naim Süleymanoğlu) was released, inspired by his work.

== Major results ==
Year	Competition	Location	Weight class	Snatch	Clean and jerk	Total	Rank
1990	European Championships	Aalborg	75 kg	150	170	320	8
1990	World Championships	Budapest	75 kg	135	165	300	15
1992	European Championships	Szekszárd	75 kg	152.5	175	327.5	7
1992	1992 Summer Olympics	Barcelona	75 kg	155	175	330	12
