= István Mészáros (weightlifter) =

Hungarian weightlifter

Personal information
- Nationality: Hungarian
- Born: 26 November 1967 (age 57); Budapest, Hungary

Sport
- Sport: Weightlifting

István Mészáros (born 26 November 1967) is a Hungarian weightlifter. He competed in the men's light heavyweight event at the 1992 Summer Olympics.
