= Hassan El-Kaissi =

Lebanese weightlifter (born 1968)

Personal information
- Nationality: Lebanese
- Born: 17 June 1968 (age 56)

Sport
- Sport: Weightlifting

Hassan El-Kaissi (born 17 June 1968) is a Lebanese weightlifter. He competed at the 1988 Summer Olympics and the 1992 Summer Olympics.
