= Italy at the 1975 Mediterranean Games =

- IOC code: ITA
- NOC: Italian National Olympic Committee

in Algiers
- Medals Ranked 1st: Gold 51 Silver 40 Bronze 36 Total 127

Mediterranean Games appearances (overview)
- 1951; 1955; 1959; 1963; 1967; 1971; 1975; 1979; 1983; 1987; 1991; 1993; 1997; 2001; 2005; 2009; 2013; 2018; 2022; 2026

Italy competed at the 1975 Mediterranean Games in Algiers, Algeria.

== Medals ==
=== Athletics ===
| Sport | Gold | Silver | Bronze | Total |
|---|---|---|---|---|
| Athletics | 10 | 10 | 6 | 26 |
| Totals (1 entries) | 10 | 10 | 6 | 26 |

==== Men ====
| Event | 1st place, gold medalist(s) | 2nd place, silver medalist(s) | 3rd place, bronze medalist(s) |
|---|---|---|---|
| 100 metres | Pietro Mennea | | |
| 200 metres | Pietro Mennea | | Pasqualino Abeti |
| 20 km walk | Armando Zambaldo | | |
| High jump | Giordano Ferrari | Enzo Del Forno | |
| Pole vault | Silvio Fraquelli | | Renato Dionisi |
| Discus throw | Armando De Vincentiis | Silvano Simeon | |
| Marathon | | Paolo Accaputo | |
| Hammer throw | | Faustino De Boni | |
| 4×100 metres relay | | Pasqualino Abeti; Luigi Benedetti; Luciano Caravani; Pietro Mennea | |
| 3000 metres steeplechase | | | Franco Fava |
| Javelin throw | | | Renzo Cramerotti |
| 4×400 metres relay | | | Alfonso Di Guida; Flavio Borghi; Bruno Magnani; Giorgio Ballati |
| | 6 | 5 | 5 |

==== Women ====
| Event | 1st place, gold medalist(s) | 2nd place, silver medalist(s) | 3rd place, bronze medalist(s) |
|---|---|---|---|
| 100 metres | Rita Bottiglieri | | |
| 800 metres | Paola Pigni | Gabriella Dorio | |
| 1500 metres | Paola Pigni | Gabriella Dorio | |
| High jump | Sara Simeoni | | |
| 200 metres | | Rita Bottiglieri | |
| 100 metres hurdles | | Ileana Ongar | |
| Discus throw | | Renata Scaglia | |
| 4×100 metres relay | | | Maura Gnecchi; Laura Nappi; Lidia Mongelli; Ileana Ongar |
| | 4 | 5 | 1 |

== See also ==
- Basketball at the 1975 Mediterranean Games
- Boxing at the 1975 Mediterranean Games
- Football at the 1975 Mediterranean Games
- Swimming at the 1975 Mediterranean Games
- Volleyball at the 1975 Mediterranean Games
- Water polo at the 1975 Mediterranean Games
