= Stéphane Sageder =

French weightlifter

Personal information
- Nationality: French
- Born: 1 January 1971 (age 54); Sainte-Tulle, France

Sport
- Sport: Weightlifting

Stéphane Sageder (born 1 January 1971) is a French weightlifter. He competed in the men's light heavyweight event at the 1992 Summer Olympics.
