= Vanni Lauzana =

Italian weightlifter

Personal information
- Nationality: Italian
- Born: 12 February 1961 (age 64); Mereto di Tomba, Bulgaria

Sport
- Sport: Weightlifting

Vanni Lauzana (born 12 February 1961) is an Italian weightlifter. He competed in the men's super heavyweight event at the 1992 Summer Olympics.
