= Ibragim Samadov =

Soviet weightlifter (born 1968)

Ibragim Berkmanovich Samadov
Personal information
- Native name: Ибрагим Беркманович Самадов
- Nationality: Chechen
- Citizenship: USSR → Russian
- Born: July 18, 1968 (age 58) Pervomayskaya, Groznensky District, Chechenskaya Respublika, USSR
- Occupation: Olympic weightlifting
- Years active: 1982-1992
- Weight: 82.5 kg (182 lb)

Sport
- Coached by: Chingisov D.; Lev Pekar; Ibragim Kodzoev; Adlan Magomedov.
Medal record
Olympic weightlifting
Representing Unified Team
Olympic Games
Disqualified	1992 Barcelona	-82.5 kg
Representing Unified Team
World Weightlifting Championships
Gold medal – first place	1991 Donaueschingen	82.5 kg
Representing Russia
European Weightlifting Championships
Gold medal – first place	1992 Szekszárd	82.5 kg
- Updated on 10 July 2019

Ibragim Berkmanovich Samadov (Ибрагим Беркманович Самадов, born July 18, 1968, in Pervomayskaya, Chechenskaya Respublika, Soviet Union) is a former Olympic weightlifter. In transition at the end of the Soviet Union, he represented the Unified Team at the 1992 Olympics in the 82.5 kg division.

Samadov was the gold medalist at the 1991 World Weightlifting Championships, representing the Soviet Union with his superior clean and jerk evening his total weight with teammate Oleksandr Blyshchyk. In 1992, Altymyrat Orazdurdyýew was the favorite, but was not selected for the Unified Team by coach and Russian national hero Vasily Alekseyev because Orazdurdiyev was from Turkmenistan, while Samadov was from Russia. Thus, Samadov was the new favorite.

The Olympic competition was the closest in history, with all three medalists tied with the same weight lifted. The first tiebreaker was the athlete's body weight and Samadov was .05 kg heavier, pushing him to the bronze medal position. The second tiebreaker was based on which athlete had lifted their weight first and Samadov would have bested eventual winner, Greek Pyrros Dimas by lifting his snatch on his second lift to Dimas' third.

At the medal ceremony, Samadov refused to lean forward to accept his medal, instead taking it in his hand, before he dropped it to the podium and walked away to very loud boos.

The International Olympic Committee (IOC) disqualified Samadov, and he serves a lifetime ban from any future Olympic Games events. Samadov apologized the following day, but the medal was not allocated, either to him or to fourth-place finisher Chon Chol-Ho, because the disqualification did not happen during the award ceremony. The IOC also refused to accept his apology, and he was also banned for life by IWF commissioner Gottfried Schödl.

Samadov was ineligible for the Weightlifting Hall of Fame, since making a medal ceremony protest was an offense and rule violation to the Olympic Games.
