= Katsuhiko Sakuma =

Japanese weightlifter

Personal information
- Nationality: Japanese
- Born: 2 February 1970 (age 55); Tokyo, Japan

Sport
- Sport: Weightlifting

Katsuhiko Sakuma (born 2 February 1970) is a Japanese weightlifter. He competed in the men's bantamweight event at the 1992 Summer Olympics.
