= Anders Bergström (weightlifter) =

Swedish weightlifter

Personal information
- Full name: Anders Torbjörn Bergström
- Born: 21 October 1966 (age 59) Sandviken, Sweden
- Height: 182 cm (6 ft 0 in)
- Weight: 132.40 kg (291.9 lb)

Sport
- Country: Sweden
- Sport: Weightlifting
- Weight class: +105 kg
- Club: Gävle KK, Gävle (SWE)
- Team: National team
- Updated on 4 October 2016

Anders Torbjörn Bergström (born 21 October 1966 in Sandviken) is a Swedish male weightlifter, competing in the +105 kg category and representing Sweden at international competitions. He participated at the 1992 Summer Olympics in the +110 kg event and at the 1996 Summer Olympics in the +108 kg event. He competed at world championships, most recently at the 1998 World Weightlifting Championships.

== Major results ==
Year	Venue	Weight	Snatch (kg)				Clean & Jerk (kg)				Total 400	Rank
Year	Venue	Weight	1	2	3	Rank	1	2	3	Rank	Total 400	Rank
Summer Olympics
1996	Atlanta, United States	+108 kg				—N/a				—N/a		12
1992	Barcelona, Spain	+110 kg				—N/a				—N/a		13
World Championships
1998	Lahti, Finland	+105 kg	~~172.5~~	~~172.5~~	~~172.5~~	---	---	---	---	---	0	---
