= Cédric Plançon =

French weightlifter (1969–2024)

Personal information
- Nationality: French
- Born: April 20, 1969 Lille, Nord, France
- Died: November 7, 2024 (aged 55)

Sport
- Sport: Weightlifting

Achievements and titles
- Olympic finals: 1992, 1996

Cédric Plançon (20 April 1969 – 7 November 2024) was a French weightlifter. He competed in two consecutive Summer Olympics for his native country, starting in 1992 (Barcelona, Spain). His best finish was the 9th place in the men's middle-heavyweight division (1992). Plançon was born in Lille, Nord on 20 April 1969, and died on 7 November 2024, at the age of 55.
