= José Andrés Ibáñez =

Spanish weightlifter

Personal information
- Nationality: Spanish
- Born: 20 January 1966 (age 59); Gandía, Spain

Sport
- Sport: Weightlifting

José Andrés Ibáñez (born 20 January 1966) is a Spanish weightlifter. He competed at the 1988 Summer Olympics and the 1992 Summer Olympics.
