= Mitko Dimitrov =

Bulgarian businessman (born 1953)

Mitko Dimitrov (Bulgarian: Митко Димитров; born 1953 in Dimitrovgrad, Bulgaria) is a prominent Bulgarian businessman. As the owner and CEO of the Payner music company promoting pop-folk music, Dimitrov belongs to the group of the most successful entrepreneurs from South-East Europe region. He has discovered and brought to fame many modern stars of the Bulgarian pop-folk music scene.

== Biography ==
Dimitrov is a graduate of the Engineering Faculty at the Technical University of Varna. During the Zhivkov era he worked as a mechanical engineer and later as a chief engineer. In 1990, he started his company Payner. In 2007 Dimitrov announced that he would run for the municipal councilor on the lists of the GERB party in his family town of Dimitrovgrad. However, after the objection of the party leader Boyko Borisov, Dimitrov withdrew his candidature.
