= Planeta TV =

Bulgarian music television channel

- Country: Bulgaria
- Broadcast area: Bulgaria; Greece (northern portion); Turkey (northwestern portion); Romania (southern portion); Serbia (eastern portion); North Macedonia (eastern portion)
- Headquarters: Sofia, Bulgaria

Programming
- Language(s): Bulgarian
- Picture format: 1080i HDTV

Ownership
- Owner: Payner Media Ltd.
- Sister channels: Planeta Folk, Planeta HD, Planeta 4K

History
- Launched: 13 November 2001

Links
- Website: http://www.planeta.tv

Planeta TV is a Bulgarian music television channel, which launched on 13 November 2001. It is owned by the company "Payner Media" Ltd., which also owns the sister channels Planeta Folk and Planeta HD, both of which started their broadcasts in 2007 and 2010 respectively. The channel is the highest rating among music channels in Bulgaria, according to studies from 2012. Planeta HD is an option for the viewer to watch the channel in high definition. Planeta musical artists have performed around the world and Planeta TV use the highest video production facilities. Planeta Folk consists of traditional Bulgarian folk music. On 17 September 2020, Planeta 4K was launched which is the first television channel in Bulgaria in UltraHD 4K format.
