= Mustapha Berraf =

Algerian sports official and executive

Mustapha Berraf (born 21 February 1954) is an Algerian sports official and executive who currently serves as the President of the Association of National Olympic Committees of Africa (ANOCA). He has been serving in that role since 2018. In 2025 Mustapha Berraf was re-elected president of the Association of National Olympic Committees of Africa, until 2029.
