= Rickard Nilsson =

Swedish weightlifter

Personal information
- Nationality: Swedish
- Born: 16 November 1960 (age 64); Stockholm, Sweden

Sport
- Sport: Weightlifting

Rickard Nilsson (born 16 November 1960) is a Swedish weightlifter. He competed at the 1988 Summer Olympics and the 1992 Summer Olympics.
