= Mitko Mitev =

Bulgarian weightlifter

Personal information
- Full name: Mitko Raykov Mitev
- Nationality: Bulgarian
- Born: 23 April 1970 (age 54); Radnevo, Bulgaria

Sport
- Sport: Weightlifting

Mitko Mitev (Bulgarian: Митко Митев, born 23 April 1970) is a Bulgarian weightlifter. He competed in the men's super heavyweight event at the 1992 Summer Olympics.
