= Juan Carlos (weightlifter) =

Spanish weightlifter

Personal information
- Nationality: Spanish
- Born: 7 March 1965 (age 60)

Sport
- Sport: Weightlifting

Juan Carlos (born 7 March 1965) is a Spanish weightlifter. He competed in the men's light heavyweight event at the 1992 Summer Olympics.
