= Kim Yong-chol (weightlifter) =

North Korean weightlifter (born 1972)

Personal information
- Nationality: North Korean
- Born: 29 March 1972 (age 53)

Sport
- Sport: Weightlifting

Kim Yong-chol (born 29 March 1972) is a North Korean weightlifter. He competed in the men's bantamweight event at the 1992 Summer Olympics.
