= Cecilio Leal =

Spanish weightlifter

Personal information
- Nationality: Spanish
- Born: 16 January 1972 (age 53); Almería, Spain

Sport
- Sport: Weightlifting

Cecilio Leal (born 16 January 1972) is a Spanish weightlifter. He competed in the men's featherweight event at the 1992 Summer Olympics.
