= Fatmir Bushi =

Albanian weightlifter (born 1963)

Fatmir Bushi (born 27 December 1963 in Tirana) is an Albanian former weightlifter who competed at the 1992 Summer Olympics.
