= Ahmed Tarbi =

Algerian weightlifter

Personal information
- Nationality: Algerian
- Born: 23 May 1954
- Died: 7 May 2021 (aged 66)

Sport
- Sport: Weightlifting

Ahmed Tarbi (23 May 1954 – 7 May 2021) was an Algerian weightlifter. He competed at the 1980 Summer Olympics and the 1984 Summer Olympics.
