= José Zurera =

Spanish weightlifter

Personal information
- Nationality: Spanish
- Born: 7 February 1966 (age 59); Aguilar de la Frontera, Spain

Sport
- Sport: Weightlifting

José Zurera (born 7 February 1966) is a Spanish weightlifter. He competed at the 1988 Summer Olympics and the 1992 Summer Olympics.
