= Reda El-Batoty =

Egyptian weightlifter

Personal information
- Nationality: Egyptian
- Born: 8 August 1963 (age 61)

Sport
- Sport: Weightlifting

Reda El-Batoty (born 8 August 1963) is an Egyptian weightlifter. He competed at the 1988 Summer Olympics and the 1992 Summer Olympics.
