= Ibrahim El-Bakh =

Egyptian weightlifter

Personal information
- Nationality: Egyptian
- Born: 6 May 1961 (age 63)

Sport
- Sport: Weightlifting

Ibrahim El-Bakh (born 6 May 1961) is an Egyptian weightlifter. He competed at the 1984 Summer Olympics and the 1992 Summer Olympics.
