= Pavelló de l'Espanya Industrial =

Barcelona Game House for Weight Lifting

Coordinates: 41°22′38.52″N 2°08′32.40″E

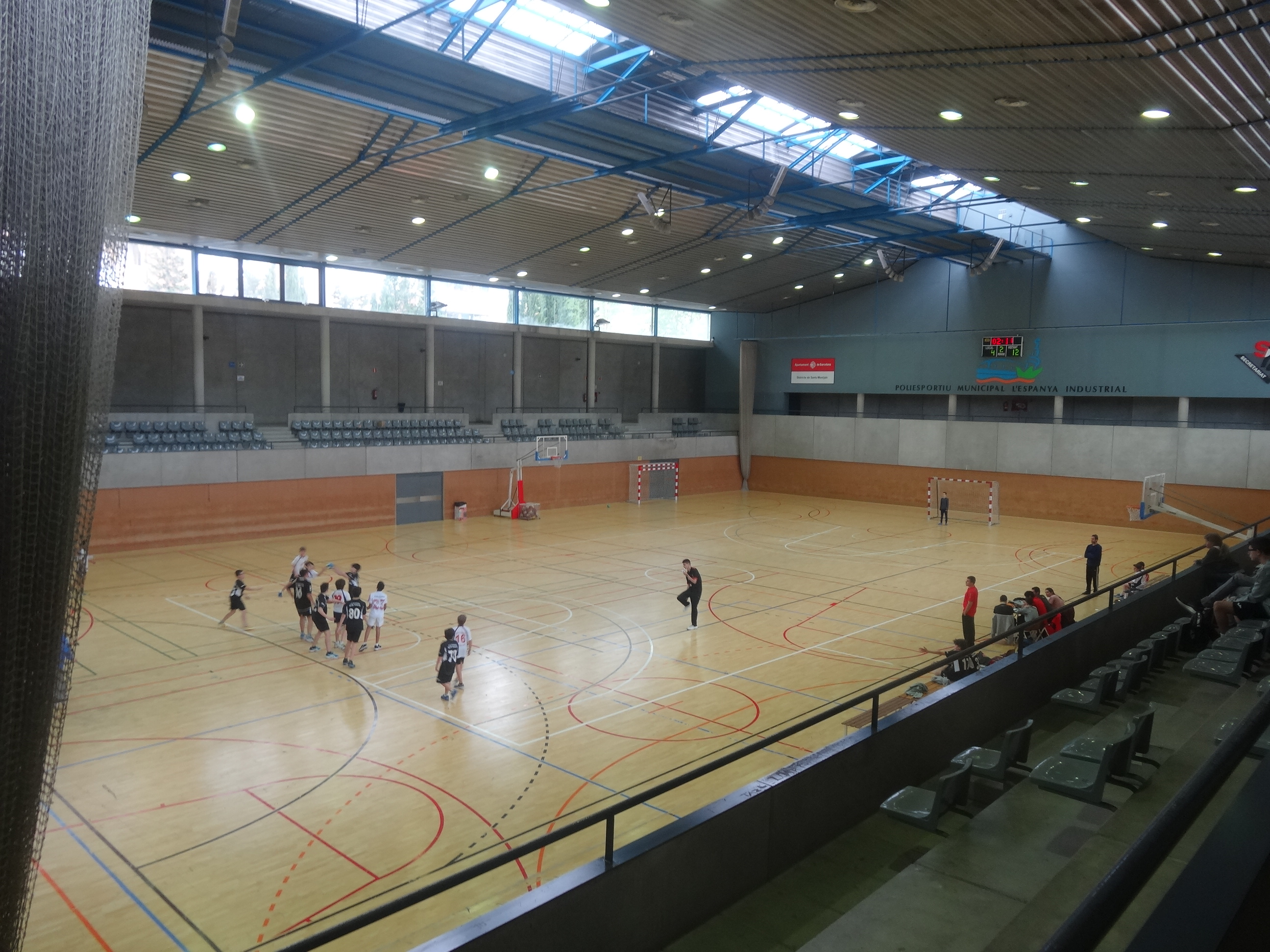
Centre Esportiu Municipal l'Espanya Industrial

The Pavelló de l'Espanya Industrial (English: Industrial Spain Pavilion), currently named Centre Esportiu Municipal l'Espanya Industrial is a building located in Barcelona. Completed in 1991, it hosted the weightlifting competitions for the 1992 Summer Olympics.
