= Lynda Mekzine =

Algerian judoka (born 1975)

Personal information
- Nationality: Algerian
- Born: 8 October 1975 (age 51)
- Occupation: Judoka

Sport
- Sport: Judo

Profile at external databases
- IJF: 53270
- JudoInside.com: 1842

Lynda Mekzine (born 8 October 1975) is an Algerian judoka. She competed in the women's half-lightweight event at the 1996 Summer Olympics.
