= Sid Ali Ferdjani =

Algerian artistic gymnast

- Born: 1 November 1976 (age 49)

Gymnastics career
- Discipline: Artistic gymnastics
- Country represented: Algeria
Medal record
Representing Algeria
Event	1st	2nd	3rd
Mediterranean Games	1	2	0
African Games	7	4	3
African Championships	15	4	3
Arab Games	8	4	2
Total	31	14	8
Mediterranean Games
Gold medal – first place	2001 Tunis	Pommel horse
Silver medal – second place	1997 Bari	Pommel horse
Silver medal – second place	2005 Almería	Pommel horse
African Games
Gold medal – first place	1999 Johannesburg	Pommel horse
Gold medal – first place	1999 Johannesburg	Parallel bars
Gold medal – first place	2003 Abuja	Team
Gold medal – first place	2003 Abuja	Pommel horse
Gold medal – first place	2003 Abuja	Horizontal bar
Gold medal – first place	2007 Algiers	Team
Gold medal – first place	2007 Algiers	Pommel horse
Silver medal – second place	1999 Johannesburg	All-around
Silver medal – second place	2003 Abuja	All-around
Silver medal – second place	2007 Algiers	All-around
Silver medal – second place	2007 Algiers	Parallel bars
Bronze medal – third place	1999 Johannesburg	Horizontal bar
Bronze medal – third place	1999 Johannesburg	Floor exercise
Bronze medal – third place	2007 Algiers	Still rings
African Championships
Gold medal – first place	1998 Walvis Bay	Team
Gold medal – first place	2000 Tunis	Team
Gold medal – first place	2000 Tunis	Pommel horse
Gold medal – first place	2000 Tunis	Horizontal bar
Gold medal – first place	2002 Algiers	Team
Gold medal – first place	2002 Algiers	All-around
Gold medal – first place	2002 Algiers	Pommel horse
Gold medal – first place	2002 Algiers	Parallel bars
Gold medal – first place	2002 Algiers	Horizontal bar
Gold medal – first place	2004 Thiès	Team
Gold medal – first place	2004 Thiès	Horizontal bar
Gold medal – first place	2006 Cape Town	Team
Gold medal – first place	2006 Cape Town	Pommel horse
Gold medal – first place	2009 Cairo	Pommel horse
Gold medal – first place	2009 Cairo	Horizontal bar
Silver medal – second place	2000 Tunis	All-around
Silver medal – second place	2009 Cairo	Team
Silver medal – second place	2012 Tunis	Team
Silver medal – second place	2012 Tunis	Pommel horse
Bronze medal – third place	2006 Cape Town	Parallel bars
Bronze medal – third place	2006 Cape Town	Horizontal bar
Bronze medal – third place	2012 Tunis	Parallel bars
Arab Games
Gold medal – first place	1999 Amman	Team
Gold medal – first place	1999 Amman	All-around
Gold medal – first place	1999 Amman	Pommel horse
Gold medal – first place	1999 Amman	Horizontal bar
Gold medal – first place	1999 Amman	Floor exercise
Gold medal – first place	2004 Algiers	Team
Gold medal – first place	2004 Algiers	Parallel bars
Gold medal – first place	2011 Doha	Parallel bars
Silver medal – second place	2004 Algiers	Floor exercise
Silver medal – second place	2007 Cairo	All-around
Silver medal – second place	2007 Cairo	Horizontal bar
Silver medal – second place	2011 Doha	Team
Bronze medal – third place	2007 Cairo	Team
Bronze medal – third place	2007 Cairo	Parallel bars
FIG World Cup
Event	1st	2nd	3rd
World Cup qualifier	0	0	1

Sid Ali Ferdjani (born 1 November 1976) is an Algerian gymnast. He began gymnastics at the age of six and represented Algeria at major international competitions, winning several medals in various competitions, most notably at the African Games, the Mediterranean Games, and the African Gymnastics Championships. He also won a bronze medal at the 2005–2006 FIG Artistic Gymnastics World Cup series in Ghent in 2006.
