= Algerian Olympic Committee =

National Olympic Committee

- Country: Algeria
- Code: ALG
- Created: 1963
- Recognized: 1964
- Continental Association: ANOCA
- Headquarters: Ben Aknoun, Algeria
- President: Abderrahmane Hammad
- Secretary General: Kheireddine Barbari
- Website: www.coa.dz

The Algerian Olympic and Sport Committee (Arabic: اللجنة الأولمبية و الرياضية الجزائرية, French: Comité Olympique et Sportif Algérien) (IOC code: ALG) is the National Olympic Committee representing Algeria. It was created on 18 October 1963 and recognized by the International Olympic Committee on 27 January 1964.

== History ==
On 23 October 1963 Mohand-Amokrane Maouche, president of the Algerian Football Federation, was elected president of the Algerian Olympic Committee by members of the Executive Board. The International Olympic Committee recognized the Algerian Olympic Committee on 27 January 1964, the occasion of the 62nd session held during the IXth Winter Olympic Games in Innsbruck (Austria).

== List of presidents ==
The following is a list of presidents of the Algerian Olympic Committee since its creation in 1963.

President	Term
Mohand Amokrane Maouche	1963–1965
Hadj Omar Dahmoun	1965–1968
Mohamed Zerguini	1968–1983
Abdenour Bekka	1983–1984
Mohamed Salah Mentouri	1984–1988
Si Mohamed Baghdadi	1988–1989
Mohamed Salah Mentouri	1989–1993
Sid Ali Lebib	1993–1996
Mustapha Berraf	1996–1998
Mustapha Larfaoui	1998–2001
Mustapha Berraf	2001–2009
Rachid Hanifi	2009–2013
Mustapha Berraf	2013–2020
Abderrahmane Hammad	2020–present

== Logo ==
Former logo

Present logo

== See also ==
- Algeria at the Olympics
- Algeria at the Paralympics
- Algeria at the African Games
- Algeria at the Mediterranean Games
- Algeria at the Islamic Solidarity Games
- Algeria at the Arab Games
