= Algeria at the 2007 All-Africa Games =

- IOC code: ALG
- NOC: Algerian Olympic Committee

in Algiers
- Medals Ranked 2nd: Gold 71 Silver 63 Bronze 77 Total 211

All-Africa Games appearances (overview)
- 1965; 1973; 1978; 1987; 1991; 1995; 1999; 2003; 2007; 2011; 2015; 2019; 2023

Youth appearances
- 2010; 2014

Algeria, participated at the 2007 All-Africa Games held in the city of Algiers, Algeria. It participated with athletes in 24 sports and won 211 medals at the end of these games.

== Medal summary ==
=== Medal table ===
Sport	Gold	Silver	Bronze	Total
Athletics	1	3	6	10
Badminton	1	0	2	3
Basketball	0	0	0	0
Boxing	4	2	2	8
Canoeing				
Chess				
Cycling	0	0	0	0
Fencing				
Football	0	0	0	0
Equestrian				
Handball	0	1	0	1
Judo	8	3	5	16
Karate				
Kick-boxing				
Rowing	3	1	2	6
Sailing				
Shooting				
Swimming	4	6	6	16
Table tennis	0	0	1	1
Taekwondo				
Tennis	6	0	1	7
Volleyball	1	0	1	2
Weightlifting				
Wrestling				
Total				

==== Gold Medal ====
Medal	Name	Sport	Event	Date	Ref
Gold	Souad Ait Salem	Athletics	Half marathon		
Gold	Nabil Lasmari	Badminton	Men's singles		
Gold	Abderahim Mechenouai	Boxing	Flyweight		
Gold	Abdelhalim Ouradi	Boxing	Bantamweight		
Gold	Abdelkader Chadi	Boxing	Featherweight		
Gold	Nabil Kassel	Boxing	Middleweight		
Gold	Omar Rebahi	Judo	60 kg		
Gold	Mounir Benamadi	Judo	66 kg		
Gold	Amar Meridja	Judo	73 kg		
Gold	Mohammed Bouaichaoui	Judo	Open class		
Gold	Meriem Moussa	Judo	48 kg		
Gold	Lila Latrous	Judo	57 kg		
Gold	Kahina Saidi	Judo	63 kg		
Gold	Rachida Ouerdane	Judo	70 kg		
Gold	Mohamed Aich	Rowing	Lightweight Single Sculls		
Gold	Kamel Ait Daoud, Mohamed Riad Garidi	Rowing	Lightweight Double Sculls		
Gold	Hafida Chaouch, Besma Dries	Rowing	Double Sculls		
Gold	Salim Iles	Swimming	50m freestyle		
Gold	Salim Iles	Swimming	100m freestyle		
Gold	Nabil Kebbab	Swimming	200m freestyle		
Gold	Sofiane Daid	Swimming	200m breaststroke		
Gold	Lamine Ouahab	Tennis	Singles		
Gold	Lamine Ouahab, Slimane Saoudi	Tennis	Doubles		
Gold	Algeria	Tennis	Team		
Gold	Samia Medjahdi	Tennis	Singles		
Gold	Samia Medjahdi, Assia Halo	Tennis	Doubles		
Gold	Algeria	Tennis	Team		
Gold	Algeria	Volleyball	Women's		

==== Silver Medal ====
Medal	Name	Sport	Event	Date	Ref
Silver	Antar Zerguelaine	Athletics	1500 m	July 22	
Silver	Abderrahmane Hammad	Athletics	High jump	July 22	
Silver	Boualem Lamri	Athletics	Decathlon	July 19	
Silver	Abdelhafid Benchebla	Boxing	Light Heavyweight		
Silver	Newfel Ouatah	Boxing	Super Heavyweight		
Silver	Algeria	Handball	Men		
Silver	Abderahmane Benamadi	Judo	81 kg		
Silver	Amar Benikhlef	Judo	90 kg		
Silver	Mohammed Bouaichaoui	Judo	+100 kg		
Silver	Amina Rouba, Hafida Chaouch	Rowing	Lightweight Double Sculls		
Silver	Nabil Kebbab	Swimming	100m freestyle		
Silver	Sofiane Daid	Swimming	100m breaststroke		
Silver	Algeria	Swimming	4×100m freestyle relay		
Silver	Algeria	Swimming	4×200m freestyle relay		
Silver	Algeria	Swimming	4×100m medley relay		
Silver	Amira Kouza	Swimming	50m breaststroke		

==== Bronze Medal ====
Medal	Name	Sport	Event	Date	Ref
Bronze	Tarek Boukensa	Athletics	Men's 1500 metres	July 22	
Bronze	Mohamed Ameur	Athletics	Men's 20 kilometres walk	July 21	
Bronze	Mohamed Benhedia	Athletics	Men's high jump	July 22	
Bronze	Larbi Bouraada	Athletics	Men's decathlon	July 19	
Bronze	Nahida Touhami	Athletics	Women's 800 metres	July 19	
Bronze	Kenza Dahmani	Athletics	Women's half marathon	July 19	
Bronze	Karim Rezig	Badminton	Men's singles		
Bronze	Algeria	Badminton	Teams		
Bronze	Rachid Tariket	Boxing	Light Welterweight		
Bronze	Abdelaziz Touilbini	Boxing	Heavyweight		
Bronze	Hassene Azzoune	Judo	100 kg		
Bronze	Soraya Haddad	Judo	52 kg		
Bronze	Kahina Hadid	Judo	78 kg		
Bronze	Souhir Madani	Judo	+78 kg		
Bronze	Souhir Madani	Judo	Open class		
Bronze	Chaouki Dries	Rowing	Single Sculls		
Bronze	Samir Alrbi-Aloui, Abdelkarim Amiche	Rowing	Double Sculls		
Bronze	Karima Lahmar	Swimming	100m backstroke		
Bronze	Meriem Lamri	Swimming	50m breaststroke		
Bronze	Meriem Lamri	Swimming	100m breaststroke		
Bronze	Lydia Yefsah	Swimming	200m breaststroke		
Bronze	Algeria	Swimming	4×200m freestyle relay		
Bronze	Algeria	Swimming	4×100m medley relay		
Bronze	Algeria	Table tennis	Men's Team		
Bronze	Algeria	Volleyball	Men's	July 22	
