= 2009 African Judo Championships =

Judo competition

2009 Judo African Judo Championships
- Location: Mauritius
- Date: 2009

Competition at external databases
- Links: JudoInside

Alaa El Idrissi Is a Judoka Originally From Morocco, Born 31 October 1987 in Casablanca. The 2010 African Judo Championships were the 30th edition of the African Judo Championships, and were held in Mauritius from 30 April to 3 May 2009.

== Medal overview ==
=== Men ===
Event	Gold	Silver	Bronze
60 kg	(Morocco) Alaa El Idrissi	(Libya) Mohamed ElKawisah	(Madagascar) Elie Norbert (Egypt) Ibrahim Awad
66 kg	(Egypt) Amin El Hady	(Morocco) Rachid Rguig	(Algeria) Mohamed Boughorfa (Madagascar) Tageot Rafaeliarison
73 kg	(Tunisia) Seifeddine Ben Hassen	(Mauritius) MacLeon Paulin	(Algeria) Noureddine Yagoubi (Egypt) Hussein Hafiz
81 kg	(Morocco) Safouane Attaf	(Egypt) Hatem Abd el Akher	(Gabon) Davy Huhues Moussavou (Tunisia) Mohamed Fadhel Gazouani
90 kg	(Egypt) Hesham Mesbah	(Cameroon) Dieudonne Dolassem	(South Africa) Patrick Trezise (Algeria) Lyes Bouyacoub
100 kg	(Egypt) Ramadan Darwish	(Algeria) Hassene Azzoune	(Cameroon) Franck Moussima (Democratic Republic of the Congo) Ndibu Mushi
+100 kg	(Egypt) Islam El Shehaby	(Tunisia) Anis Chedly	(Democratic Republic of the Congo) Cedric Mandembo Kebika (Algeria) Ammar Belgacem
Open class	(Egypt) Islam El Shehaby	(Morocco) Mohamed Merbah	(Cameroon) Franck Moussima (Tunisia) Faicel Jaballah

=== Women ===
Event	Gold	Silver	Bronze
48 kg	(Algeria) Meriem Moussa	(Tunisia) Chahnez M'barki	(Egypt) Mahitab Farouk (Mauritius) Christianne Legentil
52 kg	(Algeria) Ratiba Tariket	(South Africa) Nina Langenhoven	(Tunisia) Amani Khalfaoui (Morocco) Hanane Kerroumi
57 kg	(Algeria) Lila Latrous	(Tunisia) Hajer Barhoumi	(Burkina Faso) Séverine Nébié (Morocco) Fatima Zohra Chakir
63 kg	(Senegal) Fary Seye	(Algeria) Aida Mezerna	(Egypt) Ayah Mohamed Emad (Mauritius) Audry Catherine
70 kg	(Algeria) Kahina Hadid	(Egypt) Sarra Wahid	(Tunisia) Asma Bjaoui (Democratic Republic of the Congo) Misenga Bwaga
78 kg	(Algeria) Rachida Ouerdane	(Egypt) Samar Salah	(Cameroon) Christelle Okodombe Foguing (Tunisia) Houda Miled
+78 kg	(Tunisia) Nihel Cheikh Rouhou	(Senegal) Aminata Diatta	(Egypt) Samah Ramadan (Morocco) Rania El Kilali
Open class	(Tunisia) Nihel Cheikh Rouhou	(Egypt) Samah Ramadan	(Algeria) Amina Temmar (Cameroon) Christelle Okodombe Foguing

=== Medals table ===
Rank	Nation	Gold	Silver	Bronze	Total
1	Egypt	5	4	5	14
2	Algeria	5	2	5	12
3	Tunisia	3	3	5	11
4	Morocco	2	2	3	7
5	Senegal	1	1	0	2
6	Cameroon	0	1	4	5
7	Mauritius	0	1	2	3
8	South Africa	0	1	1	2
9	Libya	0	1	0	1
10	DR Congo	0	0	3	3
11	Madagascar	0	0	2	2
12	Burkina Faso	0	0	1	1
12	Gabon	0	0	1	1
Totals (13 entries)		16	16	32	64
