= Omar Rebahi =

Algerian judoka

Personal information
- Born: 2 September 1978 (age 46)
- Occupation: Judoka

Sport
- Sport: Judo

Profile at external databases
- IJF: 10390
- JudoInside.com: 1845

Omar Rebahi (born 2 September 1978) is an Algerian judoka.

== Achievements ==
Year	Tournament	Place	Weight Class
2008	African Judo Championships	3rd	Extra lightweight (60 kg)
2007	All-Africa Games	1st	Extra lightweight (60 kg)
2006	African Judo Championships	2nd	Extra lightweight (60 kg)
2005	African Judo Championships	1st	Extra lightweight (60 kg)
2005	Mediterranean Games	1st	Extra lightweight (60 kg)
2004	African Judo Championships	1st	Extra lightweight (60 kg)
2002	African Judo Championships	1st	Extra lightweight (60 kg)
2001	African Judo Championships	1st	Extra lightweight (60 kg)
2000	African Judo Championships	3rd	Extra lightweight (60 kg)
1999	All-Africa Games	3rd	Extra lightweight (60 kg)
1998	African Judo Championships	1st	Extra lightweight (60 kg)
1997	African Judo Championships	3rd	Extra lightweight (60 kg)
