= Haitham El Hossainy =

Egyptian judoka

Personal information
- Born: 15 August 1977 (age 48)
- Occupation: Judoka

Sport
- Sport: Judo
Medal record
Men's Judo
Representing Egypt
All-Africa Games
| Silver medal – second place | 2007 Algiers | 73 kg |
| Bronze medal – third place | 1999 Johannesburg | 73 kg |

Profile at external databases
- JudoInside.com: 7746

Haitham El Hossainy Awad (born 15 August 1977) is an Egyptian judoka.

== Achievements ==
| Year | Tournament | Place | Weight class |
|---|---|---|---|
| 2007 | All-Africa Games | 2nd | Lightweight (73 kg) |
| 2006 | African Judo Championships | 2nd | Lightweight (73 kg) |
| 2004 | African Judo Championships | 3rd | Lightweight (73 kg) |
| 2002 | African Judo Championships | 1st | Lightweight (73 kg) |
| 2001 | African Judo Championships | 2nd | Lightweight (73 kg) |
| 2001 | Mediterranean Games | 3rd | Lightweight (73 kg) |
| 2000 | African Judo Championships | 2nd | Lightweight (73 kg) |
| 1999 | All-Africa Games | 3rd | Lightweight (73 kg) |
