= Anis Chedly =

Tunisian judoka (born 1981)

Personal information
- Born: 19 February 1981 (age 45)
- Occupation: Judoka
- Height: 1.93 m (6 ft 4 in)
- Weight: 137 kg (302 lb)

Sport
- Country: Tunisia
- Sport: Judo
- Weight class: +100 kg

Achievements and titles
- Olympic Games: R32 (2008)
- World Champ.: R32 (2003, 2003, 2005, 2005, 2007, 2009, 2010)
- African Champ.: (gold) (2001, 2002, 2005, 2006, 2007, 2008, 2010)
Medal record
Men's judo
Representing Tunisia
African Games
Gold medal – first place	2007 Algiers	+100 kg
Bronze medal – third place	2007 Algiers	Open
African Championships
Gold medal – first place	2001 Tripoli	Open
Gold medal – first place	2002 Cairo	Open
Gold medal – first place	2005 Port Elizabeth	+100 kg
Gold medal – first place	2006 Mauritius	+100 kg
Gold medal – first place	2008 Agadir	+100 kg
Gold medal – first place	2010 Yaounde	Open
Silver medal – second place	2002 Cairo	+100 kg
Silver medal – second place	2004 Tunis	+100 kg
Silver medal – second place	2008 Agadir	Open
Silver medal – second place	2009 Mauritius	+100 kg
Silver medal – second place	2010 Yaounde	+100 kg
Bronze medal – third place	2000 Algiers	+100 kg
Bronze medal – third place	2001 Tripoli	+100 kg
Bronze medal – third place	2004 Tunis	Open
Bronze medal – third place	2005 Port Elizabeth	Open
Bronze medal – third place	2006 Mauritius	Open
IJF Grand Prix
Gold medal – first place	2009 Tunis	+100 kg
Bronze medal – third place	2009 Hamburg	+100 kg
Mediterranean Games
Silver medal – second place	2009 Pescara	+100 kg

Profile at external databases
- IJF: 819
- JudoInside.com: 12118
- Updated on 3 January 2023

Anis Chedly (Arabic: انيس الشاذلي; born 19 February 1981), also known as Anis Chedli or Anis Al-Chedli, is a Tunisian judoka who competed in the super heavyweight division (+100 kg) and open class. He is also a six-time African, and two-time World Cup champion in the same category, and won the gold medal at the 2007 All-Africa Games in Algiers, Algeria. At the 2008 Summer Olympics, Chedly was eliminated in the first preliminary round of the men's +100 kg, after being defeated by France's Teddy Riner, who eventually won the bronze medal. He was also the nation's flag bearer at the opening ceremony.

== Career achievements ==
Year	Tournament	Place	Weight class
2010	African Judo Championships	2nd place, silver medalist(s)	Super heavyweight (+100 kg)
2010	African Judo Championships	1st place, gold medalist(s)	Open class
2009	Mediterranean Games	2nd place, silver medalist(s)	Super heavyweight (+100 kg)s
2008	African Judo Championships	1st place, gold medalist(s)	Super heavyweight (+100 kg)
2008	African Judo Championships	2nd place, silver medalist(s)	Open class
2007	All-Africa Games	1st place, gold medalist(s)	Super heavyweight (+100 kg)s
2006	African Judo Championships	1st place, gold medalist(s)	Super heavyweight (+100 kg)
2006	African Judo Championships	3rd place, bronze medalist(s)	Open class
2005	African Judo Championships	1st place, gold medalist(s)	Super heavyweight (+100 kg)
2005	African Judo Championships	3rd place, bronze medalist(s)	Open class
2004	African Judo Championships	2nd place, silver medalist(s)	Super heavyweight (+100 kg)
2004	African Judo Championships	3rd place, bronze medalist(s)	Open class
2002	African Judo Championships	2nd place, silver medalist(s)	Super heavyweight (+100 kg)
2002	African Judo Championships	1st place, gold medalist(s)	Open class
2001	African Judo Championships	3rd place, bronze medalist(s)	Super heavyweight (+100 kg)
2001	African Judo Championships	1st place, gold medalist(s)	Open class
