= Hesham Mesbah =

Egyptian judoka (born 1982)

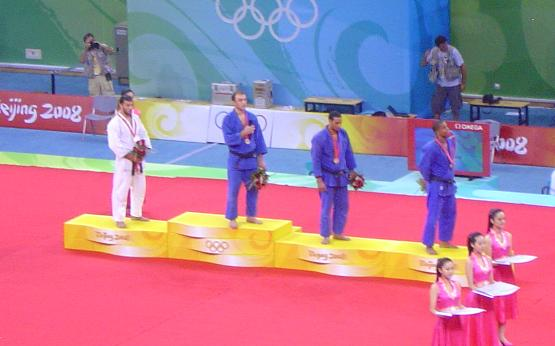

Personal information
- Born: 17 March 1982 (age 44)
- Occupation: Judoka

Sport
- Country: Egypt
- Sport: Judo
- Weight class: –90 kg

Achievements and titles
- Olympic Games: (bronze) (2008)
- World Champ.: (bronze) (2009)
- African Champ.: (gold) (2004, 2006, 2009, 2012)
Medal record
Men's judo
Representing Egypt
Olympic Games
Bronze medal – third place	2008 Beijing	‍–‍90 kg
World Championships
Bronze medal – third place	2009 Rotterdam	‍–‍90 kg
African Games
Gold medal – first place	2007 Algiers	‍–‍90 kg
Gold medal – first place	2011 Maputo	‍–‍90 kg
African Championships
Gold medal – first place	2004 Tunis	‍–‍90 kg
Gold medal – first place	2006 Mauritius	‍–‍90 kg
Gold medal – first place	2009 Mauritius	‍–‍90 kg
Gold medal – first place	2012 Agadir	‍–‍90 kg
Silver medal – second place	2005 Port Elizabeth	‍–‍90 kg
Silver medal – second place	2008 Agadir	‍–‍90 kg
Bronze medal – third place	2001 Tripoli	‍–‍90 kg
Bronze medal – third place	2002 Cairo	‍–‍90 kg
IJF Grand Prix
Gold medal – first place	2009 Qingdao	‍–‍90 kg
Silver medal – second place	2011 Qingdao	‍–‍90 kg
Bronze medal – third place	2009 Abu Dhabi	‍–‍90 kg

Profile at external databases
- IJF: 889
- JudoInside.com: 22349
- Updated on 30 May 2023

Hesham Mesbah (Egyptian Arabic: هشام مصباح; born 17 March 1982) is an Egyptian judoka. He won a bronze medal in the 2008 Summer Olympics in Beijing, Egypt's first judo medal in 24 years. He was also the 2006 African Judo Championships and 2007 All-Africa Games champion in his weight category.

== Achievements ==
Year	Tournament	Place	Weight class
2008	Olympics	3rd	Middleweight (90k)
2008	African Judo Championships	2nd	Middleweight (90 kg)
2007	World Judo Championships	5th	Middleweight (90 kg)
2007	All-Africa Games	1st	Middleweight (90 kg)
2006	African Judo Championships	1st	Middleweight (90 kg)
2005	World Judo Championships	5th	Middleweight (90 kg)
2005	African Judo Championships	2nd	Middleweight (90 kg)
2005	Mediterranean Games	2nd	Middleweight (90 kg)
2004	African Judo Championships	1st	Middleweight (90 kg)
2002	African Judo Championships	3rd	Middleweight (90 kg)
2001	African Judo Championships	3rd	Middleweight (90 kg)

Olympic Games
Preceded by Karam Gaber	Flagbearer for Egypt; London 2012	Succeeded by Ahmed El-Ahmar
