= Sami Belgroun =

Algerian judoka (born 1975)

Personal information
- Born: 12 April 1975 (age 51)
- Occupation: Judoka

Sport
- Sport: Judo
Medal record
Men's judo
All-Africa Games
Silver medal – second place	1999 Johannesburg	100 kg
Bronze medal – third place	1999 Johannesburg	Open

Profile at external databases
- IJF: 13154
- JudoInside.com: 1833

Sami Belgroun (born 12 April 1975) is an Algerian judoka.

== Achievements ==
Year	Tournament	Place	Weight class
2004	African Judo Championships	2nd	Half heavyweight (100 kg)
2002	African Judo Championships	3rd	Half heavyweight (100 kg)
2001	African Judo Championships	1st	Half heavyweight (100 kg)
2001	African Judo Championships	2nd	Open class
2000	African Judo Championships	2nd	Half heavyweight (100 kg)
1999	All-Africa Games	2nd	Half heavyweight (100 kg)
1999	All-Africa Games	3rd	Open class
1998	African Judo Championships	2nd	Open class
