= Amar Meridja =

Algerian judoka

Personal information
- Born: 17 March 1976 (age 50)
- Occupation: Judoka

Sport
- Sport: Judo
Medal record
Men's Judo
Representing Algeria
All-Africa Games
Gold medal – first place	1999 Johannesburg	66 kg
Gold medal – first place	2007 Algiers	73 kg

Profile at external databases
- IJF: 35945
- JudoInside.com: 1843

Amar Meridja (born 17 March 1976) is an Algerian judoka.

== Achievements ==
Year	Tournament	Place	Weight class
2008	African Judo Championships	1st	Lightweight (73 kg)
2007	All-Africa Games	1st	Lightweight (73 kg)
2006	African Judo Championships	1st	Lightweight (73 kg)
2005	African Judo Championships	1st	Half lightweight (66 kg)
2004	African Judo Championships	1st	Half lightweight (66 kg)
2003	All-Africa Games	1st	Half lightweight (66 kg)
2002	African Judo Championships	2nd	Half lightweight (66 kg)
2001	World Judo Championships	5th	Half lightweight (66 kg)
2001	African Judo Championships	1st	Half lightweight (66 kg)
2001	Mediterranean Games	3rd	Half lightweight (66 kg)
2000	African Judo Championships	1st	Half lightweight (66 kg)
1999	All-Africa Games	1st	Half lightweight (66 kg)
1998	African Judo Championships	1st	Half lightweight (66 kg)
1997	World Judo Championships	7th	Half lightweight (65 kg)
1997	African Judo Championships	1st	Half lightweight (65 kg)
1997	Mediterranean Games	2nd	Half lightweight (65 kg)
1996	African Judo Championships	3rd	Half lightweight (65 kg)
