= Chahnez M'barki =

Tunisian judoka (born 1981)

Personal information
- Full name: Chahnez Al-M'barki
- Born: 12 June 1981 (age 45)
- Occupation: Judoka
- Height: 1.62 m (5 ft 4 in)

Sport
- Country: Tunisia
- Sport: Judo
- Weight class: ‍–‍48 kg, ‍–‍52 kg

Achievements and titles
- Olympic Games: R32 (2008)
- World Champ.: R16 (2009)
- African Champ.: (gold) (2006, 2008)
Medal record
Women's judo
Representing Tunisia
African Games
Bronze medal – third place	2007 Algiers	‍–‍48 kg
African Championships
Gold medal – first place	2006 Mauritius	‍–‍48 kg
Gold medal – first place	2008 Agadir	‍–‍48 kg
Silver medal – second place	2001 Tripoli	‍–‍52 kg
Silver medal – second place	2005 Port Elizabeth	‍–‍48 kg
Silver medal – second place	2009 Mauritius	‍–‍48 kg
Bronze medal – third place	2004 Tunis	‍–‍48 kg
IJF Grand Slam
Bronze medal – third place	2009 Moscow	‍–‍48 kg
IJF Grand Prix
Silver medal – second place	2009 Tunis	‍–‍48 kg
Mediterranean Games
Silver medal – second place	2009 Pescara	‍–‍48 kg

Profile at external databases
- IJF: 820
- JudoInside.com: 12183
- Updated on 28 November 2022

Chahnez Al-M'barki (also Chahnez M'barki, Arabic: شهناز المباركي; born 12 June 1981) is a Tunisian judoka, who played for the extra-lightweight category. She is a six-time medalist at the African Judo Championships, and a bronze medalist at the 2007 All-Africa Games in Algiers, Algeria. She also won a silver medal for her division at the 2009 Mediterranean Games in Pescara, Italy, losing out to the host nation's Elena Moretti.

M'barki represented Tunisia at the 2008 Summer Olympics in Beijing, where she competed for the women's extra-lightweight class (48 kg). She lost the first preliminary round match, by a waza-ari awasete ippon (two full points), and a morote gari (two hand reap), to Ukraine's Lyudmyla Lusnikova.
