= Anis Lounifi =

Tunisian judoka (born 1978)

Personal information
- Native name: أنيس الونيفي
- Born: 7 January 1978 (age 48) Tunis, Tunisia
- Occupation: Judoka

Sport
- Country: Tunisia
- Sport: Judo
- Weight class: ‍–‍60 kg, ‍–‍66 kg
- Rank: 6th dan black belt

Achievements and titles
- Olympic Games: R16 (2004)
- World Champ.: (2001)
- African Champ.: (gold) (2000, 2002)
Medal record
Men's judo
Representing Tunisia
World Championships
Gold medal – first place	2001 Munich	‍–‍60 kg
Bronze medal – third place	2003 Osaka	‍–‍60 kg
African Games
Silver medal – second place	1999 Johannesburg	‍–‍66 kg
African Championships
Gold medal – first place	2000 Algiers	‍–‍60 kg
Gold medal – first place	2002 Cairo	‍–‍66 kg
Bronze medal – third place	2004 Tunis	‍–‍66 kg
Bronze medal – third place	2005 Port Elizabeth	‍–‍66 kg
Mediterranean Games
Gold medal – first place	2001 Tunis	‍–‍60 kg

Profile at external databases
- IJF: 824
- JudoInside.com: 10893
- Updated on 19 November 2022

Anis Lounifi (Arabic: أنيس الونيفي) (born 7 January 1978) is a Tunisian retired judoka. He competed at the 2000 Summer Olympics and the 2004 Summer Olympics.
