= Abdelouahed Idrissi Chorfi =

Moroccan judoka (born 1969)

Personal information
- Born: 1 January 1969 (age 57)
- Occupation: Judoka

Sport
- Sport: Judo

Profile at external databases
- IJF: 5041
- JudoInside.com: 3106

Abdelouahed Idrissi Chorfi (born 1 January 1969) is a Moroccan judoka. He competed at the 1996 Olympics as an extra-lightweight, coming seventeenth.

== Achievements ==
Year	Tournament	Place	Weight class
2002	African Judo Championships	3rd	Half lightweight (66 kg)
2001	African Judo Championships	2nd	Extra lightweight (60 kg)
2001	Mediterranean Games	3rd	Extra lightweight (60 kg)
2000	African Judo Championships	2nd	Extra lightweight (60 kg)
1998	African Judo Championships	2nd	Extra lightweight (60 kg)
1997	African Judo Championships	1st	Extra lightweight (60 kg)
1996	African Judo Championships	3rd	Extra lightweight (60 kg)
1993	Mediterranean Games	3rd	Extra lightweight (60 kg)
