= Iskander Hachicha =

Tunisian judoka (born 1972)

Personal information
- Native name: إسكندر حشيشة
- Nationality: Tunisia
- Born: March 21, 1972 (age 54) Tunis, Tunisia

Sport
- Sport: Judo
- Event: 90kg
Medal record
Men's judo
Representing Tunisia
All-Africa Games
Gold medal – first place	1999 Johannesburg	90 kg

Iskander Hachicha (Arabic: إسكندر حشيشة; born March 21, 1972) is a former Tunisian judoka.

== Achievements ==
Year	Tournament	Place	Weight class
2004	African Judo Championships	3rd	Middleweight (90 kg)
2001	World Judo Championships	5th	Middleweight (90 kg)
2001	African Judo Championships	5th	Middleweight (90 kg)
2000	African Judo Championships	1st	Middleweight (90 kg)
2000	African Judo Championships	3rd	Open class
1999	All-Africa Games	1st	Middleweight (90 kg)
1998	African Judo Championships	3rd	Middleweight (90 kg)
1997	Mediterranean Games	3rd	Middleweight (86 kg)
1996	African Judo Championships	2nd	Middleweight (86 kg)
