= Khaled Meddah =

Algerian judoka (born 1978)

Personal information
- Born: 4 March 1978 (age 48)
- Occupation: Judoka

Sport
- Sport: Judo
Medal record
Men's judo
All-Africa Games
Bronze medal – third place	1999 Johannesburg	90 kg

Profile at external databases
- IJF: 52937
- JudoInside.com: 10590

Khaled Meddah (born 4 March 1978) is an Algerian judoka.

== Achievements ==
Year	Tournament	Place	Weight class
2005	African Judo Championships	1st	Middleweight (90 kg)
2004	African Judo Championships	2nd	Middleweight (90 kg)
2002	African Judo Championships	1st	Middleweight (90 kg)
2001	African Judo Championships	5th	Middleweight (90 kg)
2001	Mediterranean Games	2nd	Middleweight (90 kg)
2000	African Judo Championships	2nd	Middleweight (90 kg)
1999	All-Africa Games	3rd	Middleweight (90 kg)
