= Islam El Shehaby =

Egyptian judoka (born 1982)

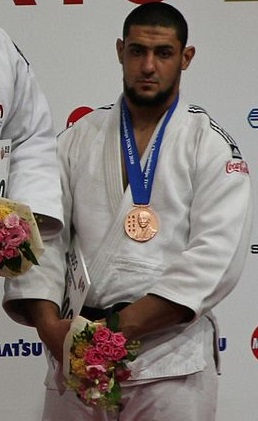
- El Shehaby at the 2010 World Judo Championships

Personal information
- Native name: إسلام الشهابي
- Nationality: Egyptian
- Born: 1 August 1982 (age 44) Cairo, Egypt
- Occupation: Judoka
- Height: 195 cm (6 ft 5 in)
- Weight: 135 kg (298 lb)

Sport
- Country: Egypt
- Sport: Judo
- Weight class: +100 kg, Open

Achievements and titles
- Olympic Games: 13th (2008)
- World Champ.: (bronze) (2010)
- African Champ.: (gold) (2002, 2004, 2008, 2009, 2009, 2010, 2011, 2011, 2013)
Medal record
Men's judo
Representing Egypt
World Championships
Bronze medal – third place	2010 Tokyo	+100 kg
African Games
Silver medal – second place	2011 Maputo	+100 kg
African Championships
Gold medal – first place	2002 Cairo	+100 kg
Gold medal – first place	2004 Tunis	Open
Gold medal – first place	2008 Agadir	Open
Gold medal – first place	2009 Mauritius	+100 kg
Gold medal – first place	2009 Mauritius	Open
Gold medal – first place	2010 Yaounde	+100 kg
Gold medal – first place	2011 Dakar	+100 kg
Gold medal – first place	2011 Dakar	Open
Gold medal – first place	2013 Maputo	Open
Silver medal – second place	2001 Tripoli	‍–‍100 kg
Silver medal – second place	2005 Port Elizabeth	Open
Silver medal – second place	2005 Port Elizabeth	+100 kg
Silver medal – second place	2006 Mauritius	+100 kg
Silver medal – second place	2008 Agadir	+100 kg
Silver medal – second place	2010 Yaounde	Open
Silver medal – second place	2012 Agadir	+100 kg
Silver medal – second place	2014 Port Louis	+100 kg
Silver medal – second place	2015 Libreville	+100 kg
Bronze medal – third place	2001 Tripoli	Open
Bronze medal – third place	2004 Tunis	+100 kg
Bronze medal – third place	2013 Maputo	+100 kg
World Masters
Silver medal – second place	2011 Baku	+100 kg
Bronze medal – third place	2012 Almaty	+100 kg
IJF Grand Slam
Gold medal – first place	2010 Moscow	+100 kg
Bronze medal – third place	2010 Rio de Janeiro	+100 kg
IJF Grand Prix
Gold medal – first place	2009 Abu Dhabi	+100 kg
Gold medal – first place	2010 Düsseldorf	+100 kg
Gold medal – first place	2010 Qingdao	+100 kg
Gold medal – first place	2011 Baku	+100 kg
Silver medal – second place	2010 Abu Dhabi	+100 kg
Silver medal – second place	2016 Düsseldorf	+100 kg
Bronze medal – third place	2009 Qingdao	+100 kg
Bronze medal – third place	2011 Abu Dhabi	+100 kg
Bronze medal – third place	2013 Samsun	+100 kg
Mediterranean Games
Bronze medal – third place	2005 Almeria	+100 kg
Bronze medal – third place	2009 Pescara	+100 kg

Profile at external databases
- IJF: 892
- JudoInside.com: 10442
- Updated on 25 July 2023

Islam El Shehaby (Arabic: إسلام الشهابي ʾIslām ash-Shahābī; born 1 August 1982) is an Egyptian former judoka.

El Shehaby competed at the 2004, 2008, 2012, and 2016 Summer Olympics. El Shehaby was a nine-time African Champion (2002–13), and was a world bronze medalist at the 2010 World Judo Championships. El Shehaby won five World Cup medals, and competitions in Abu Dhabi 2009, Düsseldorf 2010, Moscow 2010, Qingdao 2010, and Baku 2011. El Shehaby won silver at the 2016 Düsseldorf Grand Prix in the +100 kg category.

Following controversy regarding his refusal to shake the hand of Israeli judoka Or Sasson, who defeated him at the 2016 Summer Olympics, El Shehaby retired in August 2016. The Disciplinary Committee of the International Olympic Committee issued a "severe reprimand" to El Shehaby for behavior violating "the rules of fair play and against the spirit of friendship embodied in the Olympic Values," and he was sent home before the Olympics closing ceremony.

== Personal life ==
Islam El Shehaby was born in Cairo, Egypt, and is a conservative Salafi Muslim. He is 1.95 m (6 ft 5 in) tall, and weighs 135 kg (298 lb)

== 2016 Olympics controversy ==
El Shehaby competed at the 2016 Olympics in Rio de Janeiro, Brazil, where he was thrown twice by and lost to Israeli judoka Or Sasson, who later won a bronze medal in this competition. After the match, El Shehaby refused to bow or shake hands with his opponent, after the Israeli had bowed to him. As a result of his major breach of judo etiquette, the Egyptian was loudly booed and jeered by the near-capacity crowd.

After his defeat, El Shehaby lay flat on his back for a moment before standing to take his place before Sasson, in front of the referee. When Sasson extended his hand to the Egyptian, El Shehaby backed away, shaking his head and shunning Sasson. The referee then called El Shehaby back to the mat and demanded that he bow, at which point El Shehaby gave a quick nod of his head.

El Shehaby's conduct was widely condemned as unsportsmanlike. American coach Jimmy Pedro said "That is extremely rare in judo. It is especially disrespectful considering it was a clean throw and a fair match. It was completely dishonourable and totally unsportsmanlike on the part of the Egyptian." BBC judo commentator Mark Doran said. "That is not what the Olympics are about."

El Shehaby's refusal to shake hands had precedent, in actions by another member of Egypt's team. Egyptian judoka Ramadan Darwish had refused to shake hands with his Israeli opponent Arik Zeevi, another Israeli Olympic bronze medalist, in both the 2011 Judo Grand Slam and the 2012 Judo Grand Prix.

Prior to competing, El Shehaby had been urged to forfeit the match by Egyptian Islamists and nationalists, as Iranian Javad Mahjoub had done years earlier in forfeiting a match against Or Sasson. The Egyptian Olympic Committee stated that El Shehaby was alerted before the match to abide by all the rules and have sporting spirit. The committee also stated that what he did was a personal action.

Both the International Olympic Committee and the International Judo Federation stated that they would review the incident, to see if action should be taken. It is unclear what potential punishment El Shehaby or Egyptian judo as a whole could face, but his hopes of medaling were dashed regardless due to Sasson's decisive performance in the quarterfinals.

Following his defeat and the related controversy, El Shehaby announced he was retiring from judo.

The Ethics Committee and the Disciplinary Committee of the International Olympic Committee issued a "severe reprimand" to El Shehaby for behavior violating "the rules of fair play and against the spirit of friendship embodied in the Olympic Values", and he was reportedly sent home before the Olympics closing ceremony. IOC Disciplinary Committee also requested that the Egyptian Olympic Committee in the future make certain that all Egyptian athletes are properly educated as to the Olympic Values before they participate in the Olympic Games. Egypt's Judo Federation however denied that he had been punished and claimed he had traveled back home with his team as scheduled since it was customary for athletes to go back once their competitions were finished.

== Achievements ==
Year	Tournament	Place	Weight class
2016	2016 Summer Olympics	DSQ	Heavyweight (+100 kg)
2008	African Judo Championships	2nd	Heavyweight (+100 kg)
2008	African Judo Championships	1st	Open class
2006	African Judo Championships	2nd	Heavyweight (+100 kg)
2006	African Judo Championships	5th	Open class
2005	African Judo Championships	2nd	Heavyweight (+100 kg)
2005	African Judo Championships	2nd	Open class
2005	Mediterranean Games	3rd	Heavyweight (+100 kg)
2004	African Judo Championships	3rd	Heavyweight (+100 kg)
2004	African Judo Championships	1st	Open class
2002	African Judo Championships	1st	Heavyweight (+100 kg)
2001	African Judo Championships	2nd	Heavyweight (+100 kg)
2001	African Judo Championships	3rd	Open class

== See also ==
- Boycotts of Israel in individual sports
