= Makrem Ayed =

Tunisian judoka (born 1973)

Personal information
- Native name: مكرم•عياد
- Born: 15 September 1973 (age 52)
- Occupation: Judoka
- Height: 1.7 m (5 ft 7 in)
- Weight: 60 kg (132 lb)

Sport
- Sport: Judo
Medal record
Men's judo
Representing Tunisia
All-Africa Games
| Gold medal – first place | 1999 Johannesburg | -60 kg |

Profile at external databases
- JudoInside.com: 3520

Makrem Ayed (born 15 September 1973) is a Tunisian judoka.

== Achievements ==
| Year | Tournament | Place | Weight class | Source |
|---|---|---|---|---|
| 2004 | African Judo Championships | 2nd | Extra lightweight (60 kg) | |
| 2002 | African Judo Championships | 2nd | Extra lightweight (60 kg) | |
| 2000 | African Judo Championships | 3rd | Half lightweight (66 kg) | |
| 1999 | All-Africa Games | 1st | Extra lightweight (60 kg) | |
| 1998 | African Judo Championships | 5th | Extra lightweight (60 kg) | |
| 1997 | Mediterranean Games | 2nd | Extra lightweight (60 kg) | |
| 1996 | African Judo Championships | 1st | Extra lightweight (60 kg) | |
