= Aboumedan El Sayed =

Egyptian judoka (born 1977)

Personal information
- Born: 29 October 1977 (age 48)
- Occupation: Judoka

Sport
- Sport: Judo

Profile at external databases
- IJF: 49506
- JudoInside.com: 2252

Aboumedan El Sayed (born 29 October 1977) is an Egyptian judoka. He competed for Egypt at the 2004 Summer Olympics.

== Achievements ==
Year	Tournament	Place	Weight class
2004	African Judo Championships	3rd	Half middleweight (81 kg)
2002	African Judo Championships	2nd	Half middleweight (81 kg)
2001	African Judo Championships	2nd	Half middleweight (81 kg)
2001	Mediterranean Games	3rd	Half middleweight (81 kg)
2000	African Judo Championships	3rd	Half middleweight (81 kg)
1998	African Judo Championships	3rd	Half middleweight (81 kg)
1996	African Judo Championships	2nd	Half middleweight (78 kg)
