= Adil Belgaïd =

Moroccan judoka (born 1970)

Personal information
- Native name: عادل•بلكايد
- Born: 15 September 1970 (age 56)
- Occupation: Judoka
- Height: 1.83 m (6 ft 0 in)
- Weight: 81 kg (179 lb)

Sport
- Sport: Judo

Profile at external databases
- IJF: 13049
- JudoInside.com: 3098

Adil Belgaïd (born 15 September 1970) is a Moroccan judoka. He competed at the Summer Olympics in 1996, 2000, and 2004.

== Achievements ==
Year	Tournament	Place	Weight class
2004	African Judo Championships	2nd	Half middleweight (81 kg)
2002	African Judo Championships	3rd	Open class
2001	World Judo Championships	7th	Half middleweight (81 kg)
2001	African Judo Championships	3rd	Half middleweight (81 kg)
2001	African Judo Championships	3rd	Open class
2000	African Judo Championships	1st	Half middleweight (81 kg)
1998	African Judo Championships	1st	Half middleweight (81 kg)
1998	African Judo Championships	7th	Open class
1997	African Judo Championships	1st	Half middleweight (78 kg)
1997	Mediterranean Games	2nd	Half middleweight (78 kg)
1996	African Judo Championships	1st	Half middleweight (78 kg)
1996	African Judo Championships	2nd	Open class
1993	World Judo Championships	7th	Half middleweight (78 kg)
1993	Mediterranean Games	3rd	Half middleweight (78 kg)

Olympic Games
Preceded by Khalid Skah	Flag bearer for Morocco; 2000 Sydney	Succeeded by Nezha Bidouane
