= Sadok Khalgui =

Tunisian judoka (born 1978)

Medal record

Men's judo

All-Africa Games
Bronze medal – third place	1999 Johannesburg	100 kg

Sadok Khalgui (born 6 November 1978) is a Tunisian former judoka.

== Achievements ==
Year	Tournament	Place	Weight class
2002	African Judo Championships	2nd	Half heavyweight (100 kg)
2001	African Judo Championships	3rd	Half heavyweight (100 kg)
2001	Mediterranean Games	3rd	Half heavyweight (100 kg)
2000	African Judo Championships	3rd	Half heavyweight (100 kg)
1999	All-Africa Games	3rd	Half heavyweight (100 kg)
