= Mohamed Bouaichaoui =

Algerian judoka (born 1979)

Personal information
- Born: 15 January 1979 (age 47)
- Occupation: Judoka

Sport
- Sport: Judo
Medal record
Men's Judo
Representing Algeria
All-Africa Games
Gold medal – first place	1999 Johannesburg	+100 kg
Gold medal – first place	2007 Algiers	Open
Silver medal – second place	2007 Algiers	+100 kg

Profile at external databases
- IJF: 2236
- JudoInside.com: 1835

Mohamed Bouaichaoui (born 15 January 1979) is an Algerian judoka.

== Achievements ==
Year	Tournament	Place	Weight class
2007	All-Africa Games	2nd	Heavyweight (+100 kg)
2007	All-Africa Games	1st	Open class
2005	African Judo Championships	3rd	Heavyweight (+100 kg)
2005	African Judo Championships	1st	Open class
2004	African Judo Championships	1st	Heavyweight (+100 kg)
2002	African Judo Championships	3rd	Heavyweight (+100 kg)
2002	African Judo Championships	5th	Open class
2001	African Judo Championships	1st	Heavyweight (+100 kg)
2001	Mediterranean Games	2nd	Heavyweight (+100 kg)
2000	African Judo Championships	1st	Heavyweight (+100 kg)
1999	All-Africa Games	1st	Heavyweight (+100 kg)
1998	African Judo Championships	3rd	Heavyweight (+100 kg)
