= Meriem Moussa =

Algerian judoka (born 1988)

Personal information
- Born: 11 May 1988 (age 38)
- Occupation: Judoka
- Height: 1.50 m (4 ft 11 in)

Sport
- Country: Algeria
- Sport: Judo
- Weight class: ‍–‍48 kg, ‍–‍52 kg

Achievements and titles
- Olympic Games: R16 (2008)
- World Champ.: R16 (2010, 2011)
- African Champ.: (gold) (2007, 2009, 2017)
Medal record
Women's judo
Representing Algeria
African Games
Gold medal – first place	2007 Algiers	‍–‍48 kg
Bronze medal – third place	2019 Rabat	‍–‍52 kg
African Championships
Gold medal – first place	2009 Mauritius	‍–‍48 kg
Gold medal – first place	2017 Antananarivo	‍–‍52 kg
Silver medal – second place	2008 Agadir	‍–‍48 kg
Silver medal – second place	2016 Tunis	‍–‍52 kg
Bronze medal – third place	2006 Mauritius	‍–‍48 kg
Bronze medal – third place	2010 Yaounde	‍–‍52 kg
Bronze medal – third place	2014 Port Louis	‍–‍52 kg
Bronze medal – third place	2015 Libreville	‍–‍52 kg
Bronze medal – third place	2018 Tunis	‍–‍52 kg
Bronze medal – third place	2019 Cape Town	‍–‍52 kg
IJF Grand Slam
Bronze medal – third place	2010 Paris	‍–‍52 kg
African Junior Championships
Gold medal – first place	2005 Tunis	‍–‍48 kg
Gold medal – first place	2006 South Africa	‍–‍48 kg
Summer Universiade
Bronze medal – third place	2007 Bangkok	‍–‍48 kg
Bronze medal – third place	2011 Shenzhen	‍–‍52 kg

Profile at external databases
- IJF: 755
- JudoInside.com: 39199
- Updated on 28 November 2022

Meriem Moussa (Arabic: مَرْيَم مُوسَى; born 11 May 1988) is an Algerian judoka, who competes in the extra-lightweight category.

== Career ==
Moussa was a four-time medalist at the African Championships, and a gold medalist at the 2007 All-Africa Games in Algiers. She also won two bronze medals in the same division at the 2007 Summer Universiade in Bangkok, Thailand, and at the 2011 Summer Universiade in Shenzhen, China.

Moussa represented Algeria at the 2008 Summer Olympics in Beijing, where she competed for the women's extra-lightweight class (48 kg). She defeated Gabon's Sandrine Ilendou in the first preliminary round, before losing out her next match by a waza-ari (half-point) to Germany's Michaela Baschin.

In October 2011, Moussa refused to compete against Israel's Shahar Levi in the knockout round of the Judo World Cup in Rome, Italy.

== See also ==
- Boycotts of Israel in individual sports
