= Jean-Claude Cameroun =

Cameroonian judoka (born 1973)

Personal information
- Born: 7 June 1973 (age 52)
- Occupation: Judoka

Sport
- Sport: Judo

Profile at external databases
- JudoInside.com: 12884

Jean-Claude Cameroun (born June 7, 1973) is a Cameroonian judoka.

== Achievements ==
| Year | Tournament | Place | Weight class |
|---|---|---|---|
| 2004 | African Judo Championships | 3rd | Extra lightweight (60 kg) |
| 2002 | African Judo Championships | 3rd | Extra lightweight (60 kg) |
| 2001 | African Judo Championships | 7th | Half lightweight (66 kg) |
| 2000 | African Judo Championships | 2nd | Half lightweight (66 kg) |
