= Gisèle Mendy =

Senegalese Olympic judoka (born 1979)

Personal information
- Nationality: Senegal
- Born: 19 December 1979 (age 46)
- Occupation: Judoka
- Height: 1.72 m (5 ft 7 1/2 in)
- Weight: 70 kg (154 lb)

Sport
- Sport: Judo
- Event: 70 kg
Medal record
Women's judo
Representing Senegal
All-Africa Games
Silver medal – second place	2007 Algiers	70 kg
African Championships
Silver medal – second place	2008 Agadir	70 kg
Bronze medal – third place	2005 Port Elizabeth	70 kg
Bronze medal – third place	2006 Port Louis	70 kg

Profile at external databases
- JudoInside.com: 377

Gisèle Mendy (born 19 December 1979) is a Senegalese judoka, who played for the middleweight category. She won three medals for her division at the African Judo Championships (2005, 2006, and 2008). She also captured a silver medal in the same division at the 2007 All-Africa Games in Algiers, Algeria, losing out to Algeria's Rachida Ouerdane.

Mendy represented Senegal at the 2008 Summer Olympics in Beijing, where she competed for the women's 70 kg class. She lost the first preliminary round match, by an ippon (full point) and a te gatame (hand armlock), to German judoka and Olympic bronze medalist Annett Böhm. Because her opponent advanced further into the semi-finals, Mendy offered another shot for the bronze medal by entering the repechage rounds. Unfortunately, she was defeated in her first match by Ukraine's Nataliya Smal, who successfully scored a waza-ari-awasete-ippon (full point) and a kuchiki taoshi (single leg takedown), at fifty-two seconds.
