= Matthew Jago =

South African Olympic judoka

Matthew Etan Jago
Personal information
- Full name: Matthew Etan Jago
- Nationality: South Africa
- Born: 12 January 1987 (age 39) Johannesburg, South Africa
- Height: 1.73 m (5 ft 8 in)
- Weight: 81 kg (179 lb)

Sport
- Sport: Judo
- Event: 81 kg
- Club: Tatami Judo Club

Achievements and titles
- World finals: 1 Gold and 1 Silver
- Regional finals: 2 Gold 3 silver
- National finals: 12 Gold
- Highest world ranking: 19
Medal record
Men's judo
Representing South Africa
All-Africa Games
| Bronze medal – third place | 2007 Algiers | 81 kg |
African Championships
| Silver medal – second place | 2008 Agadir | 81 kg |

Matthew Etan Jago (born 12 January 1987 in Johannesburg) is a South African judoka, who played for the half-middleweight category. He won a bronze medal for his division at the 2007 All-Africa Games in Algiers, Algeria, and silver at the 2008 African Judo Championships in Agadir, Morocco, losing out to Morocco's Safouane Attaf. He won a total of judo Sa Championship 12 gold medals.

Jago represented South Africa at the 2008 Summer Olympics in Beijing, where he competed for the men's half-middleweight class (81 kg). He received a bye for the second preliminary round, before losing out by a waza-ari (half-point) and a seoi-nage (shoulder throw) to Poland's Robert Krawczyk.
