= Youssef Badra =

Tunisian judoka (born 1984)

Personal information
- Nationality: Tunisia
- Born: 5 July 1984 (age 41)
- Height: 1.85 m (6 ft 1 in)
- Weight: 81 kg (179 lb)

Sport
- Sport: Judo
- Event: 81 kg
Medal record
Men's judo
Representing Tunisia
All-Africa Games
Gold medal – first place	2007 Algiers	81 kg
African Championships
Gold medal – first place	2005 Port Elizabeth	81 kg
Gold medal – first place	2006 Port Louis	81 kg
Bronze medal – third place	2008 Agadir	81 kg

Youssef Badra (Arabic: يوسف بدرة; born July 5, 1984) is a Tunisian judoka, who played for the half-middleweight category. He is a two-time African judo champion, and a gold medalist for his division at the 2007 All-Africa Games in Algiers, Algeria.

Badra represented Tunisia at the 2008 Summer Olympics in Beijing, where he competed for the men's half-middleweight class (81 kg). He lost the first preliminary round match, by two yuko and a false attack penalty (P12), to Montenegro's Srđan Mrvaljević.
