= Younes Ahamdi =

Moroccan judoka (born 1976)

Personal information
- Native name: يونس أحمدي
- Nationality: Moroccan
- Born: 14 April 1976 (age 50)

Sport
- Country: Morocco
- Sport: Judo
Medal record
Men's judo
Representing Morocco
African Championships
Gold medal – first place	2008 Agadir	60 kg
Gold medal – first place	2008 Port Louis	60 kg
Bronze medal – third place	2004 Tunis	60 kg

Younes Ahamdi (Arabic: يونس أحمدي; born 14 April 1976) is a Moroccan judoka. Ahamdi participated in the 2004 Summer Olympics, where he was defeated in the round of 32 by Russian Evgeny Stanev.

== Achievements ==
Year	Tournament	Place	Weight class
2008	African Judo Championships	1st	Extra lightweight (60 kg)
2006	African Judo Championships	1st	Extra lightweight (60 kg)
2004	African Judo Championships	3rd	Extra lightweight (60 kg)
2002	African Judo Championships	5th	Extra lightweight (60 kg)
