= Henriette Moller =

South African Olympic judoka

Personal information
- Full name: Henriette Moller
- Nationality: South Africa
- Born: 20 November 1972 (age 53) Mossel Bay, Western Cape, South Africa
- Occupation: Judoka
- Height: 1.62 m (5 ft 4 in)
- Weight: 63 kg (139 lb)

Sport
- Sport: Judo
- Event: 63 kg
Medal record
Women's judo
Representing South Africa
All-Africa Games
| Bronze medal – third place | 1999 Johannesburg | 63 kg |
Asian Championships
| Silver medal – second place | 2004 Tunis | 63 kg |
| Bronze medal – third place | 2000 Algiers | 63 kg |
| Bronze medal – third place | 2002 Cairo | 63 kg |

Profile at external databases
- JudoInside.com: 3629

Henriette Moller (born November 20, 1972, in Mossel Bay, Western Cape) is a South African judoka, who competed in the women's half-middleweight category. She picked up a total of twelve medals in her career, including a silver from the 2004 African Judo Championships in Tunis, Tunisia and a bronze from the 1999 All-Africa Games in Johannesburg, and represented her nation South Africa in the 63-kg class at the 2004 Summer Olympics.

Moller qualified as a lone judoka for the South African squad in the women's half-middleweight class (63 kg) at the 2004 Summer Olympics in Athens, by placing second and granting a berth from the African Championships in Tunis, Tunisia. Moller received a bye in the first round, but fell short in a pulverizing ippon defeat and an ippon seoi nage (one-arm shoulder throw) to North Korea's Hong Ok-song one minute and twenty-two seconds into her subsequent match.
