= Judo at the 2007 All-Africa Games =

Judo competition

Judo Judo at the 2007 All-Africa Games
- Venue: Algiers
- Location: Algiers, Algeria
- Dates: 12–14 July 2007

Competition at external databases
- Links: JudoInside

The judo competition at the 2007 All-Africa Games were held in Algiers, Algeria on 14 July 2007.

== Medal overview ==
=== Men ===
Event	Gold	Silver	Bronze
60 kg	(Algeria) Omar Rebahi	(Egypt) Atef Mustapha	(Madagascar) Elie Norbert (Ivory Coast) Deza Elie Gbate
66 kg	(Algeria) Mounir Benamadi	(Egypt) Amin El Hady	(Zambia) Wakunguma Shapa (Tunisia) Ragheb Karchoud
73 kg	(Algeria) Amar Meridja	(Egypt) Haitham El Hossainy	(Tunisia) Anis Dkhili (Nigeria) Nsa Bashir
81 kg	(Tunisia) Youssef Badra	(Algeria) Abderahmane Benamadi	(South Africa) Matthew Jago (Egypt) Hatem Abd el Akher
90 kg	(Egypt) Hesham Mesbah	(Algeria) Amar Benikhlef	(Senegal) Pape Ousmane Ndiaye (Tunisia) Mohamed Bouguerra
100 kg	(Cameroon) Frank Moussima	(Senegal) Bara Ndiaye	(Algeria) Hassene Azzoune (Libya) Mohamed Ben Saleh
+100 kg	(Tunisia) Anis Chedly	(Algeria) Mohammed Bouaichaoui	(Angola) Denis Oliveira (Senegal) Djeguy Bathily
Open class	(Algeria) Mohammed Bouaichaoui	(Senegal) Djeguy Bathily	(Ivory Coast) Amadou Kanate (Tunisia) Anis Chedly

=== Women ===
Event	Gold	Silver	Bronze
48 kg	(Algeria) Meriem Moussa	(Gabon) Sandrine Ilendou	(Tunisia) Chahinez Mbarki (Democratic Republic of the Congo) Elsa Enye
52 kg	(Senegal) Hortense Diedhiou	(Tunisia) Amani Khalfaoui	(Algeria) Soraya Haddad (Nigeria) Justina Agatahi
57 kg	(Algeria) Lila Latrous	(Tunisia) Hajer Barhoumi	(Senegal) Fary Seye (Nigeria) Catherine Ekuta
63 kg	(Algeria) Kahina Saidi	(Tunisia) Nesrine Jlassi	(Gabon) Adjane Koumba (Nigeria) Funmilola Adebayo
70 kg	(Algeria) Rachida Ouerdane	(Senegal) Gisèle Mendy	(Angola) Antónia Moreira (South Africa) Marisca Loots
78 kg	(Tunisia) Houda Miled	(Nigeria) Vivian Yusuf	(Algeria) Kahina Hadid (Cameroon) Christelle Foguing
+78 kg	(Egypt) Samah Ramadan	(Nigeria) Adijat Ayuba	(Tunisia) Nihel Cheikh Rouhou (Algeria) Souhir Madani
Open class	(Tunisia) Nihel Cheikh Rouhou	(Cameroon) Christelle Foguing	(Egypt) Samah Ramadan (Algeria) Souhir Madani

=== Medal table ===
Rank	Nation	Gold	Silver	Bronze	Total
1	Algeria	8	3	5	16
2	Tunisia	4	3	6	13
3	Egypt	2	3	2	7
4	Senegal	1	3	3	7
5	Cameroon	1	1	1	3
6	Nigeria	0	2	4	6
7	Gabon	0	1	1	2
8	Angola	0	0	2	2
8	Ivory Coast	0	0	2	2
8	South Africa	0	0	2	2
11	DR Congo	0	0	1	1
11	Libya	0	0	1	1
11	Madagascar	0	0	1	1
11	Zambia	0	0	1	1
Totals (14 entries)		16	16	32	64

== Results overview ==
=== Men ===
==== 60 kg ====
Position	Judoka	Country
1.	Omar Rebahi	Algeria
2.	Atef Mustapha	Egypt
3.	Elie Norbert	Madagascar
3.	Deza Elie Gbate	Ivory Coast
5.	Herman Zoungrana	Burkina Faso
5.	Bilal Fofana	Senegal
7.	Arnaud Liyeli	Congo DR
7.	Mohamed Kawesah	Libya

==== 66 kg ====
Position	Judoka	Country
1.	Mounir Benamadi	Algeria
2.	Amin El Hady	Egypt
3.	Wakunguma Shapa	Zambia
3.	Ragheb Karchoud	Tunisia
5.	Harmel Zoungrana	Burkina Faso
5.	Edson Madeira	Mozambique
7.	Alexis Chifor Tadifo	Cameroon
7.	José Simoes	Angola

==== 73 kg ====
Position	Judoka	Country
1.	Amar Meridja	Algeria
2.	Haitham El Hossainy	Egypt
3.	Anis Dkhili	Tunisia
3.	Nsa Bashir	Nigeria
5.	Emmanuel Kojo Nartey	Ghana
5.	Maceleon Desire Paulin	Mauritania
7.	Akram Abussetta	Libya
7.	Angelo Ferna Antonio	Angola

==== 81 kg ====
Position	Judoka	Country
1.	Yousef Badra	Tunisia
2.	Abderahmane Benamadi	Algeria
3.	Matthew Jago	South Africa
3.	Hatem Abd el Akher	Egypt
5.	Kinapeya Romeo Kone	Ivory Coast
5.	Nkewami Lokuku	Congo DR
7.	Kouami Sacha Denanyoh	Togo
7.	Boas Munyonga	Zambia

==== 90 kg ====
Position	Judoka	Country
1.	Hisham Mesbah	Egypt
2.	Amar Benikhlef	Algeria
3.	Pape Ousmane Ndiaye	Senegal
3.	Mohamed Bouguerra	Tunisia
5.	Patrick Trezise	South Africa
5.	David Afonso	Angola
7.	Dieudonné Dolassem	Cameroon
7.	Basile Dieudonné	Chad

==== 100 kg ====
Position	Judoka	Country
1.	Frank Moussima	Cameroon
2.	Bara Ndiaye	Senegal
3.	Hassene Azzoune	Algeria
3.	Mohamed Bensaleh	Libya
5.	Sami Souissi	Tunisia
5.	Mustafa Darwish	Egypt
7.	Gary Anderhold	South Africa
7.	Mohamed Lamin Soumah	Guinea

==== +100 kg ====
Position	Judoka	Country
1.	Anis Chedly	Tunisia
2.	Mohammed Bouaichaoui	Algeria
3.	Denis Oliveira	Angola
3.	Djeguy Bathily	Senegal
5.	Abdoulaye Sou Southia Ousma	Cameroon
5.	Noureldin Morsy	Egypt
7.	Bagname Sylla	Mali
7.	Billy Braimah	Nigeria

==== Open class ====
Position	Judoka	Country
1.	Mohammed Bouaichaoui	Algeria
2.	Djeguy Bathily	Senegal
3.	Amadou Kanate	Ivory Coast
3.	Anis Chedly	Tunisia
5.	Mustafa Darwish	Egypt
5.	Bagname Sylla	Mali
7.	David Afonso	Angola
7.	Mita Nchamt Jose	Equatorial Guinea

=== Women ===
==== 48 kg ====
Position	Judoka	Country
1.	Meriem Moussa	Algeria
2.	Sandrine Ilendou	Gabon
3.	Chahinez Mbarki	Tunisia
3.	Elsa Honorine Oyama Enye	Congo DR
5.	Naina Marthine Randriamalala	Madagascar
5.	Franca Audu	Nigeria
7.	Philomene Bata	Cameroon
7.	Naldjim Rosia	Chad

==== 52 kg ====
Position	Judoka	Country
1.	Hortense Diedhiou	Senegal
2.	Amani Khalfaoui	Tunisia
3.	Soraya Haddad	Algeria
3.	Justina Erez Agatahi	Nigeria
5.	Clarisse Ebrottie Nda	Ivory Coast
5.	Finaritra Raliterasasolo	Madagascar
7.	Isabel Garcia	Angola
7.	Ngandeu Weyinjam	Cameroon

==== 57 kg ====
Position	Judoka	Country
1.	Lila Latrous	Algeria
2.	Hajer Barhoumi	Tunisia
3.	Fary Seye	Senegal
3.	Ewa Catherine Ekuta	Nigeria
5.	Atio Severine Nbebie	Burkina Faso
5.	Huguette Bakao	Congo DR
7.	Wilhelmina Strydom	South Africa
7.	Juseneide Gourgel	Angola

==== 63 kg ====
Position	Judoka	Country
1.	Kahina Saidi	Algeria
2.	Nesrine Jlassi	Tunisia
3.	Adjane Audrey Koumba	Gabon
3.	Funmilola Adebayo	Nigeria
5.	Cécile Hanne	Senegal
5.	Dicko Coulibaly	Burkina Faso
7.	Bianca Visser	South Africa
7.	Ngarlemdana Carine	Chad

==== 70 kg ====
Position	Judoka	Country
1.	Rachida Ouardane	Algeria
2.	Gisèle Mendy	Senegal
3.	Antonia Moreira	Angola
3.	Marisca Loots	South Africa
5.	Tapra Felicite	Chad
5.	Monica Buanga	Congo DR
7.	Bikisu Yusuf Sankah	Nigeria
7.	Koulibal Moussocoura	Mali

==== 78 kg ====
Position	Judoka	Country
1.	Houda Miled	Tunisia
2.	Vivian Yusuf	Nigeria
3.	Kahina Hadid	Algeria
3.	Christelle Okodombe Foguing	Cameroon
5.	Nada Gaballa	Egypt
5.	Aissata Thiam	Senegal
7.	Kimberly Imongo	Congo DR
7.	none	none

==== +78 kg ====
Position	Judoka	Country
1.	Samah Ramadan	Egypt
2.	Adijat Ayuba	Nigeria
3.	Nihel Chikhrouhou	Tunisia
3.	Souhir Madani	Algeria
5.	Sidonie Jiepmou	Cameroon
5.	Elma Bartolomeu	Angola
7.	Racky Bolly	Senegal
7.	Nian Precil Hirepiew	Mauritania

==== Open class ====
Position	Judoka	Country
1.	Nihel Chikhrouhou	Tunisia
2.	Christelle Okodombe Foguing	Cameroon
3.	Samah Ramadan	Egypt
3.	Souhir Madani	Algeria
5.	Racky Bolly	Senegal
5.	Elma Bartolomeu	Angola
7.	Martina Uwandu	Nigeria
7.	Kimberly Imongo	Congo DR
