= Abderrahmane Benamadi =

Algerian judoka (born 1985)

Abderahmane Benamadi
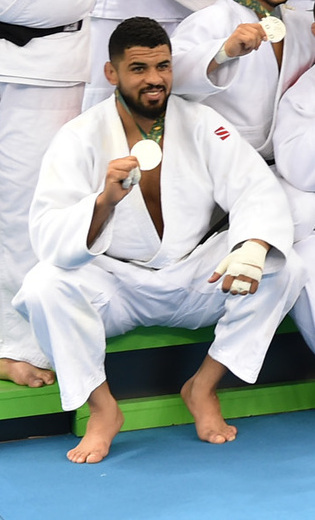

Personal information
- Born: 3 July 1985 (age 41)
- Occupation: Judoka

Sport
- Country: Algeria
- Sport: Judo
- Weight class: ‍–‍81 kg, ‍–‍90 kg

Achievements and titles
- Olympic Games: R64 (2016)
- World Champ.: (silver) (2005)
- African Champ.: (gold) (2011, 2015, 2016, 2018, 2021, 2022)
Medal record
Men's judo
Representing Algeria
World Championships
Silver medal – second place	2005 Cairo	‍–‍81 kg
African Games
Gold medal – first place	2011 Maputo	‍–‍81 kg
Gold medal – first place	2015 Brazzaville	‍–‍90 kg
Silver medal – second place	2007 Algiers	‍–‍81 kg
African Championships
Gold medal – first place	2011 Dakar	‍–‍81 kg
Gold medal – first place	2015 Libreville	‍–‍90 kg
Gold medal – first place	2016 Tunis	‍–‍90 kg
Gold medal – first place	2018 Tunis	‍–‍90 kg
Gold medal – first place	2021 Dakar	‍–‍90 kg
Gold medal – first place	2022 Oran	‍–‍90 kg
Silver medal – second place	2012 Agadir	‍–‍81 kg
Silver medal – second place	2014 Port Louis	‍–‍90 kg
Silver medal – second place	2019 Cape Town	‍–‍90 kg
Silver medal – second place	2020 Antananarivo	‍–‍90 kg
Bronze medal – third place	2005 Port Elizabeth	‍–‍81 kg
Bronze medal – third place	2006 Mauritius	‍–‍81 kg
Bronze medal – third place	2008 Agadir	‍–‍81 kg
Bronze medal – third place	2017 Antananarivo	‍–‍90 kg
Pan Arab Games
Bronze medal – third place	2011 Doha	‍–‍81 kg

Profile at external databases
- IJF: 761
- JudoInside.com: 38752
- Updated on 19 November 2022

Abderrahmane Benamadi (Arabic: عبد الرحمان بن عمادي, born 3 July 1985) is an Algerian judoka. He competed at the 2016 Summer Olympics, placing 33rd.

== Achievements ==
Year	Tournament	Place	Weight class
2011	All-Africa Games	1st	Half middleweight (81 kg)
2008	African Judo Championships	3rd	Half middleweight (81 kg)
2007	All-Africa Games	2nd	Half middleweight (81 kg)
2006	African Judo Championships	3rd	Half middleweight (81 kg)
2005	World Judo Championships	2nd	Half middleweight (81 kg)
2005	African Judo Championships	3rd	Half middleweight (81 kg)
2005	Mediterranean Games	3rd	Half middleweight (81 kg)
