= Vivian Yusuf =

Nigerian Olympic judoka

Personal information
- Full name: Vivian Aminu Yusuf
- Nationality: Nigeria
- Born: 8 August 1983 (age 43)
- Weight: 78 kg (172 lb)

Sport
- Sport: Judo
- Event: 78 kg
- Coached by: Bashir Bassey (national)
Medal record
Women's judo
Representing Nigeria
All-Africa Games
Silver medal – second place	2007 Algiers	78 kg
African Championships
Silver medal – second place	2008 Agadir	78 kg

Vivian Aminu Yusuf (born 8 August 1983) is a Nigerian judoka, who played for the half-heavyweight category. She won two silver medals at the 2007 All-Africa Games in Algiers, Algeria, and at the 2008 African Judo Championships in Agadir, Morocco, both losing out to Tunisia's Houda Miled in the final match.

Yusuf represented Nigeria at the 2008 Summer Olympics in The Games of the XXIX Olympiad in Beijing, China, where she competed for the women's half-heavyweight class (78 kg). She received a bye for the second preliminary round, before losing out to Germany's Heide Wollert, who was able to score an automatic ippon at thirty-seven seconds.
