= Funmilola Adebayo =

Nigerian judoka

Personal information
- Full name: Funmilola Adebayo
- Nationality: Nigeria
- Born: 27 August 1985 (age 40) Nigeria

Sport
- Sport: Judo
- Event(s): 52 kg, 63 kg
Medal record
Women's judo
Representing Nigeria
International Tournament of Mauritius
Gold medal – first place	2004 Mauritius	52 kg
African Judo Championships
Bronze medal – third place	2005 Port Elizabeth	57 kg
All-Africa Games
Bronze medal – third place	2007 Algiers	63 kg

Funmilola Adebayo (born 27 August 1985) is a Nigerian judoka who competed, in the women's category. She won a bronze medal at the 2007 Pan African Games, a silver medal at the 2005 African Judo Championships and a gold medal at the 2004 Mauritius International.

== Sports career ==
At the 2004 International Tournament of Mauritius in St. Denis, Mauritius. Adebayo participated in the 52 kg event and she won a gold medal.

At the 2005 African Judo Championships in Port Elizabeth, Adebayo competed in the 57kg event and won a silver medal. In 2007 Africa Games held in Algiers, Algeria. She won a bronze medal having participated in the 63kg event.
