= Safouane Attaf =

Moroccan judoka (born 1984)

Personal information
- Born: 9 March 1984 (age 42)
- Occupation: Judoka

Sport
- Country: Morocco
- Sport: Judo
- Weight class: ‍–‍81 kg

Achievements and titles
- Olympic Games: R16 (2008, 2012)
- World Champ.: R32 (2003, 2007, 2009, 2010, 2011)
- African Champ.: (gold) (2008, 2009, 2010, 2012, 2013, 2014)
Medal record
Men's judo
Representing Morocco
African Championships
Gold medal – first place	2008 Agadir	‍–‍81 kg
Gold medal – first place	2009 Mauritius	‍–‍81 kg
Gold medal – first place	2010 Yaounde	‍–‍81 kg
Gold medal – first place	2012 Agadir	‍–‍81 kg
Gold medal – first place	2013 Maputo	‍–‍81 kg
Gold medal – first place	2014 Port Louis	‍–‍81 kg
Bronze medal – third place	2001 Tripoli	‍–‍73 kg
Bronze medal – third place	2002 Cairo	‍–‍81 kg
Bronze medal – third place	2005 Port Elizabeth	‍–‍81 kg
Bronze medal – third place	2011 Dakar	‍–‍81 kg
IJF Grand Prix
Bronze medal – third place	2011 Amsterdam	‍–‍81 kg
Mediterranean Games
Bronze medal – third place	2009 Pescara	‍–‍81 kg

Profile at external databases
- IJF: 935
- JudoInside.com: 13522
- Updated on 1 January 2023

Safouane Attaf (born 9 March 1984, in Kenitra) is a Moroccan judoka. He competed in the men's 81 kg event at the 2012 Summer Olympics; after defeating Liva Saryee in the second round, he was eliminated by Leandro Guilheiro in the third round. At the 2008 Summer Olympics, he reached the second round, where he was defeated by Euan Burton.
