= Maryann Ekeada =

Nigerian judoka (born 1979)

Personal information
- Full name: Maryann Ekeada
- Nationality: Nigeria
- Born: 23 July 1979 (age 46) Nigeria

Sport
- Sport: Judo
- Event(s): 57 kg, 63 kg
Medal record
Women's judo
Representing Nigeria
African Judo Championships
| Bronze medal – third place | 1997 Casablanca | 56 kg |
| Silver medal – second place | 2001 Tripoli | 63 kg |
| Bronze medal – third place | 2004 Tunis | 63 kg |

Maryann Ekeada (born 23 July 1979) is a Nigerian judoka who competed in the women's lightweight category. She won three medals at the African Judo Championships between 1997 and 2004.

== Sports career ==
In 1997, at the 19th edition of the African Judo Championships held in Casablanca, Morocco, Maryann took part in the 56 kg event and won the bronze medal. At the 2001 African Judo Championships held in Tripoli, Libya, she also participated and earned her way to a silver medal but this time in the 63 kg event.

The 2004 African Judo Championships was held in Tunis, Tunisia and Maryann got the bronze medal also in the 63 kg event.
