= Houda Miled =

Tunisian judoka (born 1987)

Personal information
- Native name: هدى ميلاد
- Nationality: Tunisia
- Born: 8 February 1987 (age 39) Kairouan, Tunisia
- Occupation: Judoka
- Height: 171 cm (5 ft 7 in)

Sport
- Country: Tunisia
- Sport: Judo
- Weight class: ‍–‍70 kg, ‍–‍78 kg

Achievements and titles
- Olympic Games: R16 (2008, 2012)
- World Champ.: (bronze) (2009)
- African Champ.: (gold) (2005, 2006, 2008, 2010, 2011, 2012, 2015)
Medal record
Women's judo
Representing Tunisia
World Championships
Bronze medal – third place	2009 Rotterdam	‍–‍70 kg
African Games
Gold medal – first place	2007 Algiers	‍–‍78 kg
Gold medal – first place	2011 Maputo	‍–‍70 kg
Silver medal – second place	2015 Brazzaville	‍–‍70 kg
African Championships
Gold medal – first place	2005 Port Elizabeth	‍–‍78 kg
Gold medal – first place	2006 Mauritius	‍–‍78 kg
Gold medal – first place	2008 Agadir	‍–‍78 kg
Gold medal – first place	2010 Yaounde	‍–‍70 kg
Gold medal – first place	2011 Dakar	‍–‍70 kg
Gold medal – first place	2012 Agadir	‍–‍70 kg
Gold medal – first place	2015 Libreville	‍–‍70 kg
Silver medal – second place	2016 Tunis	‍–‍70 kg
Bronze medal – third place	2009 Mauritius	‍–‍78 kg
Bronze medal – third place	2013 Maputo	‍–‍70 kg
IJF Grand Prix
Bronze medal – third place	2009 Abu Dhabi	‍–‍70 kg
Bronze medal – third place	2010 Tunis	‍–‍70 kg
World Juniors Championships
Bronze medal – third place	2006 Santo Domingo	‍–‍78 kg
African Junior Championships
Gold medal – first place	2005 Tunis	‍–‍78 kg
Gold medal – first place	2006 South Africa	+78 kg
Mediterranean Games
Silver medal – second place	2009 Pescara	‍–‍78 kg
Jeux de la Francophonie
Silver medal – second place	2009 Beirut	‍–‍70 kg
Pan Arab Games
Silver medal – second place	2011 Doha	‍–‍70 kg

Profile at external databases
- IJF: 821
- JudoInside.com: 32581
- Updated on 5 September 2023

Houda Miled (Arabic: هدى ميلاد; born 8 February 1987 in Kairouan, Tunisia) is a Tunisian judoka. She represented her country in two Summer Olympics: in 2008 in the 78 kg event (where she lost her first match to Stéphanie Possamaï) and in 2012 in the 70 kg event (where she lost her first match to Chen Fei). Miled won a bronze medal at the 2009 World Judo Championships and has been dominant at the African Judo Championships where she has won the gold medal every year between 2005 and 2012 with the exception of the 2009 tournament where she won the bronze.
