= 2004 African Judo Championships =

Judo competition

2004 Judo African Judo Championships
- Venue: Tunis
- Location: Tunisia
- Date: 2004

Competition at external databases
- Links: JudoInside

The 2004 African Judo Championships were the 25th edition of the African Judo Championships, and were held in Tunis, Tunisia from 7 May to 8 May 2004.

== Medal overview ==
=== Men ===
Event	Gold	Silver	Bronze
60 kg	(Algeria) Omar Rebahi	(Tunisia) Makrem Ayed	(Morocco) Younes Ahamdi (Cameroon) Jean-Claude Cameroun
66 kg	(Algeria) Amar Meridja	(Egypt) Amin El Hady	(Niger) Abdou Alassane Dji Bo (Tunisia) Anis Lounifi
73 kg	(Cameroon) Bernard Mvondo-Etoga	(Algeria) Noureddine Yagoubi	(Egypt) Haitham El Hossainy (Ivory Coast) Olivier Mondouho
81 kg	(Algeria) Amar Benikhlef	(Morocco) Adil Belgaïd	(Egypt) Aboumedan El Sayed (South Africa) Francois French
90 kg	(Egypt) Hesham Mesbah	(Algeria) Khaled Meddah	(Morocco) Mohamed El Asri (Tunisia) Iskander Hachicha
100 kg	(Egypt) Bassel El Gharabawy	(Algeria) Sami Belgroun	(Senegal) Bara Ndiaye (Cameroon) Frank Moussima
+100 kg	(Algeria) Mohamed Bouaichaoui	(Tunisia) Anis Chedly	(Egypt) Islam El Shehaby (Nigeria) Chukwuemeka Onyemachi
Open class	(Egypt) Islam El Shehaby	(Cameroon) Armand Kamga	(Tunisia) Anis Chedly (Algeria) Hassene Azzoune

=== Women ===
Event	Gold	Silver	Bronze
48 kg	(Algeria) Soraya Haddad	(Burkina Faso) Hanatou Ouelego	(Tunisia) Chahinez Mbarki (Cameroon) Philomene Bata
52 kg	(Algeria) Salima Souakri	(Madagascar) Naina Cecilia Ravaoarisoa	(Tunisia) Hayet Rouinni (Guinea) M'mah Soumah
57 kg	(Algeria) Lila Latrous	(Tunisia) Hajer Barhoumi	(Nigeria) Catherine Ekuta (Morocco) Fatima Zahra Aït Ali
63 kg	(Tunisia) Saida Dhahri	(South Africa) Henriette Moller	(Senegal) Fanta Keita (Nigeria) Maryann Ekeada
70 kg	(Algeria) Rachida Ouerdane	(Angola) Antonia Moreira	(Tunisia) Yousra Zribi (Cameroon) Christelle Okodombe
78 kg	(Tunisia) Houda Ben Deya	(Gabon) Melanie Engoang	(Cameroon) Hildegarde Asse none
+78 kg	(Tunisia) Insaf Yahyaoui	(Egypt) Samah Ramadan	(Republic of the Congo) Tatiana Bvegadzi (Morocco) Samira Chhab
Open class	(Tunisia) Insaf Yahyaoui	(Egypt) Samah Ramadan	(Morocco) Samira Chhab (Cameroon) Hildegarde Asse

=== Medals table ===
Rank	Nation	Gold	Silver	Bronze	Total
1	Algeria	8	3	0	11
2	Tunisia	4	3	5	12
3	Egypt	3	3	3	9
4	Cameroon	1	1	5	7
5	Morocco	0	1	5	6
6	South Africa	0	1	1	2
7	Angola	0	1	0	1
7	Burkina Faso	0	1	0	1
7	Gabon	0	1	0	1
7	Madagascar	0	1	0	1
11	Nigeria	0	0	3	3
12	Senegal	0	0	2	2
13	Congo	0	0	1	1
13	Guinea	0	0	1	1
13	Ivory Coast	0	0	1	1
13	Niger	0	0	1	1
Totals (16 entries)		16	16	28	60
