= Justina Agatahi =

Nigerian judoka

Personal information
- Full name: Justina Erez Agatahi
- Nationality: Nigeria
- Born: 15 August 1989 (age 36) Nigeria

Sport
- Sport: Judo
- Event: 52 kg
Medal record
Women's judo
Representing Nigeria
All-Africa Games
Bronze medal – third place	2007 Alger	52 kg
Bronze medal – third place	2008 Agadir	52 kg
International Tournament
Gold medal – first place	2008 Nabeul	U52 kg

Justina Agatahi (born 15 August 1989) is a Nigerian judoka who competed in the women's U52kg category. She won bronze medals at the 2007 All-Africa Games, 2008 African Judo Championships and a gold medal at the International Tournament Nabeul, Tunisia.

== Sports career ==
At the Africa Games 2007, held in Maputo, Mozambique. She won a bronze medal in the 52 kg event.

At the 2008 African Judo Championships in Agadir, Morocco, Agatahi competed again in the 52 kg event and won a bronze medal.

Still in 2008, she participated in the International Tournament Nabeul, Tunisia and won a gold medal in the women's U52kg.
