= Elie Norbert =

Malagasy judoka

Personal information
- Nationality: Malagasy
- Born: 23 January 1984 (age 42)
- Occupation: Judoka
- Height: 1.62 m (5 ft 4 in)
- Weight: 60 kg (130 lb)

Sport
- Sport: Judo
- Event: 60 kg
Medal record
Men's judo
Representing Madagascar
All-Africa Games
Bronze medal – third place	2007 Algiers	60 kg
African Championships
Silver medal – second place	2008 Agadir	60 kg
Bronze medal – third place	2006 Port Louis	60 kg

Profile at external databases
- JudoInside.com: 42772

Elie Norbert (born January 23, 1984) is a Malagasy judoka who competed in the 60-kg category. He represented Madagascar at the 2008 Summer Olympics in Beijing, after winning the bronze medal at the 2007 All-Africa Games in Algiers, Algeria. Norbert received a bye for the second round, before losing out to North Korea's Kim Kyong-Jin, who scored an ippon to end an allotted time of eight minutes in the first period.
