= Nihel Cheikh Rouhou =

Tunisian judoka (born 1987)

Nihel Chikhrouhou
Personal information
- Native name: نهال شيخ روحو
- Nationality: Tunisian
- Born: 5 January 1987 (age 39) Sfax, Tunisia
- Occupation: Judoka
- Height: 164 cm (5 ft 5 in)

Sport
- Country: Tunisia
- Sport: Judo
- Weight class: +78 kg

Achievements and titles
- Olympic Games: 7th (2016)
- World Champ.: (bronze) (2017)
- African Champ.: (gold) × 18 times
Medal record
Women's judo
Representing Tunisia
World Championships
Bronze medal – third place	2017 Marrakesh	Open
African Games
Gold medal – first place	2007 Algiers	Open
Gold medal – first place	2011 Maputo	+78 kg
Gold medal – first place	2015 Brazzaville	+78 kg
Gold medal – first place	2019 Rabat	+78 kg
Bronze medal – third place	2007 Algiers	+78 kg
African Championships
Gold medal – first place	2008 Agadir	+78 kg
Gold medal – first place	2008 Agadir	Open
Gold medal – first place	2009 Mauritius	+78 kg
Gold medal – first place	2009 Mauritius	Open
Gold medal – first place	2010 Yaounde	+78 kg
Gold medal – first place	2010 Yaounde	Open
Gold medal – first place	2011 Dakar	+78 kg
Gold medal – first place	2011 Dakar	Open
Gold medal – first place	2013 Maputo	+78 kg
Gold medal – first place	2013 Maputo	Open
Gold medal – first place	2014 Port Louis	+78 kg
Gold medal – first place	2015 Libreville	+78 kg
Gold medal – first place	2015 Libreville	Open
Gold medal – first place	2016 Tunis	+78 kg
Gold medal – first place	2018 Tunis	+78 kg
Gold medal – first place	2018 Tunis	Open
Gold medal – first place	2019 Cape Town	+78 kg
Gold medal – first place	2021 Dakar	+78 kg
Silver medal – second place	2012 Agadir	+78 kg
Silver medal – second place	2012 Agadir	Open
Silver medal – second place	2014 Port Louis	Open
Bronze medal – third place	2016 Tunis	Open
World Masters
Bronze medal – third place	2021 Doha	+78 kg
IJF Grand Slam
Silver medal – second place	2009 Moscow	+78 kg
Silver medal – second place	2010 Paris	+78 kg
Silver medal – second place	2014 Baku	+78 kg
Silver medal – second place	2016 Tyumen	+78 kg
Silver medal – second place	2018 Düsseldorf	+78 kg
Silver medal – second place	2020 Budapest	+78 kg
Silver medal – second place	2022 Tbilisi	+78 kg
Bronze medal – third place	2016 Baku	+78 kg
Bronze medal – third place	2019 Abu Dhabi	+78 kg
Bronze medal – third place	2021 Tashkent	+78 kg
Bronze medal – third place	2021 Antalya	+78 kg
IJF Grand Prix
Gold medal – first place	2014 Samsun	+78 kg
Silver medal – second place	2010 Tunis	+78 kg
Silver medal – second place	2015 Düsseldorf	+78 kg
Silver medal – second place	2015 Samsun	+78 kg
Silver medal – second place	2015 Budapest	+78 kg
Silver medal – second place	2018 Zagreb	+78 kg
Silver medal – second place	2019 Budapest	+78 kg
Bronze medal – third place	2018 Tunis	+78 kg
Bronze medal – third place	2018 Budapest	+78 kg
Bronze medal – third place	2019 Marrakesh	+78 kg
African Junior Championships
Gold medal – first place	2005 Tunis	+78 kg
Mediterranean Games
Silver medal – second place	2018 Tarragona	+78 kg
Silver medal – second place	2013 Mersin	+78 kg
Silver medal – second place	2022 Oran	+78 kg
Bronze medal – third place	2009 Pescara	+78 kg

Profile at external databases
- IJF: 822
- JudoInside.com: 33015
- Updated on 26 June 2023

Nihel Cheikh Rouhou (Arabic: نهال شيخ روحو; born 5 January 1987 in Sfax, Tunisia) is a Tunisian judoka. She competed at the 2008 and 2012 Summer Olympics in the +78 kg event.

At the 2008 Summer Olympics, she beat Carmen Chalá in the first round before losing to Kim Na-Young.

At the 2012 Summer Olympics, she lost to Maria Suelen Altheman.

In 2019, she won the gold medal in the women's +78 kg event at the African Games held in Rabat, Morocco.

In 2021, she won one of the bronze medals in her event at the Judo World Masters held in Doha, Qatar. At the 2021 African Judo Championships held in Dakar, Senegal, she won the gold medal in her event. In June 2021, she competed in the women's +78 kg event at the 2021 World Judo Championships held in Budapest, Hungary. She also competed in the women's +78 kg event at the 2020 Summer Olympics in Tokyo, Japan.

She won the silver medal in the women's +78 kg event at the 2022 Mediterranean Games held in Oran, Algeria.
