= Amar Benikhlef =

Algerian judoka (born 1982)

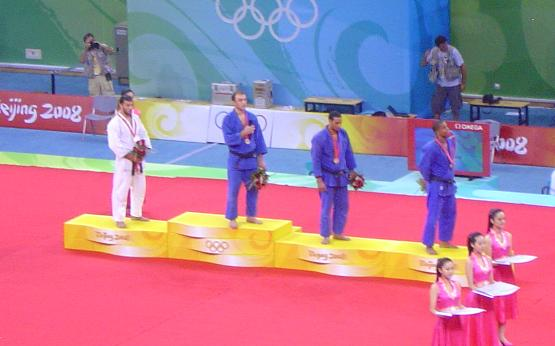

Personal information
- Born: 11 January 1982 (age 44)
- Occupation: Judoka

Sport
- Country: Algeria
- Sport: Judo
- Weight class: ‍–‍81 kg, ‍–‍90 kg

Achievements and titles
- Olympic Games: (silver) (2008)
- World Champ.: R16 (2011)
- African Champ.: (gold) (2004, 2008, 2010, 2011)
Medal record
Men's judo
Representing Algeria
Olympic Games
Silver medal – second place	2008 Beijing	‍–‍90 kg
African Games
Silver medal – second place	2007 Algiers	‍–‍90 kg
African Championships
Gold medal – first place	2004 Tunis	‍–‍81 kg
Gold medal – first place	2008 Agadir	‍–‍90 kg
Gold medal – first place	2010 Yaounde	‍–‍90 kg
Gold medal – first place	2011 Dakar	‍–‍90 kg
Bronze medal – third place	2006 Mauritius	‍–‍90 kg
Bronze medal – third place	2012 Agadir	‍–‍90 kg
Bronze medal – third place	2013 Maputo	‍–‍90 kg
IJF Grand Slam
Bronze medal – third place	2008 Tokyo	‍–‍90 kg
Bronze medal – third place	2010 Paris	‍–‍90 kg
Mediterranean Games
Bronze medal – third place	2009 Pescara	‍–‍100 kg

Profile at external databases
- IJF: 759
- JudoInside.com: 31502
- Updated on 30 May 2023

Amar Benikhlef (born 11 January 1982) is an Algerian judoka who competed in the middleweight division. He won the silver medal at the 2008 Summer Olympics in Beijing. In September 2021, Benikhlef was suspended for 10 years, until July 2031 for "a clear and very serious breach of the IJF Statutes, the IJF Code of Ethics and the Olympic Charter.".

== Biography ==
After a judoka he coached, Fethi Nourine, was selected to compete at the 2020 Summer Games in the ‍–‍73 kg weight class, Nourine and Benikhlef each announced Nourine's withdrawal following the conclusion of the draw of competitors. They said the withdrawal was because they were supporting the Palestinian cause by not competing against Israeli Tohar Butbul, whom Nourine was drawn to potentially face in the second round, had he won in the first round. The IJF announced his and Nourine's immediate suspensions on 24 July 2021, pending a further investigation, and sent the two of them back home to Algeria from Tokyo. The Federation explained:

"According to the IJF rules, in line with the Olympic Charter and especially with rule 50.2 that provides for the protection of the neutrality of sport at the Olympic Games and the neutrality of the Games themselves, which states that 'no kind of demonstration or political, religious or racial propaganda is permitted in any Olympic sites, venues or other areas,' Fethi Nourine and Amar Benikhlef are now suspended and will face a decision by the IJF Disciplinary Commission, as well as disciplinary sanctions by the National Olympic Committee of Algeria back in their country.'"

It continued: "Judo sport is based on a strong moral code, including respect and friendship, to foster solidarity and we will not tolerate any discrimination, as it goes against the core values and principles of our sport." The Federation Disciplinary Commission will handle final sanctioning beyond the Olympics. In September 2021, Benikhlef was suspended for 10 years, until July 2031.

== Achievements ==
Year	Tournament	Place	Weight class
2013	African Judo Championships	3rd	Middleweight (90 kg)
2012	African Judo Championships	3rd	Middleweight (90 kg)
2011	African Judo Championships	1st	Middleweight (90 kg)
2011	World Military Championships	3rd	Middleweight (90 kg)
2010	African Judo Championships	1st	Middleweight (90 kg)
2008	Olympics	2nd	Middleweight (90 kg)
2008	African Judo Championships	1st	Middleweight (90 kg)
2007	All-Africa Games	2nd	Middleweight (90 kg)
2006	African Judo Championships	3rd	Middleweight (90 kg)
2004	African Judo Championships	1st	Half middleweight (81 kg)
