= 1997 African Judo Championships =

Judo competition

Judo 1997 African Judo Championships
- Venue: Casablanca
- Location: Casablanca, Morocco
- Dates: 17–19 July 1997

Competition at external databases
- Links: JudoInside

The 1997 African Judo Championships is the 19th edition of the African Judo Championships, organised by the African Judo Union. It took place in Casablanca, Morocco from 17 to 19 July 1997.

== Medal overview ==
=== Men ===
| Event | Gold | Silver | Bronze |
|---|---|---|---|
| −60 kg | Abdelouahed Idrissi Chorfi (MAR) | Sami Mekni (TUN) | Laval Collett (MRI); Omar Rebahi (ALG) |
| −65 kg | Amar Meridja (ALG) | Karim Seck Abdou (SEN) | Makram Neili (TUN); Duncan Mackinnon (RSA) |
| −71 kg | Noureddine Yagoubi (ALG) | Eddy Andre (MRI) | Zaoui Abdellatif (MAR); David Kouassi (CIV) |
| −78 kg | Adil Belgaid (MAR) | Tolba Ridha (EGY) | Amady Mbaré Diop (SEN) |
| −86 kg | Ashraf Bahgat (EGY) | Yassine Silimi (ALG) | Jean-Claude Raphael (MRI); Charles Etame (CMR) |
| −95 kg | Steve Biwole Abolo (CMR) | Belkacem Hirech (ALG) | Mourad Zaghouan (TUN); Antonio Felicite (MRI) |
| +95 kg | Larbi Kamel (ALG) | Abdellaoui Abdellaziz (MAR) | Ebode Tsanga Claude (CMR); Ahmed Ettaib (EGY) |
| Open | Larbi Kamel (ALG) | Mourad Zaghouan (TUN) | Steve Biwole Abolo (CMR); Ahmed Ettaib (EGY) |

=== Women ===
| Event | Gold | Silver | Bronze |
|---|---|---|---|
| −48 kg | Khadija El Hamdaoui (MAR) | Soleil Rasoafaniry (MAD) | Lovelyn Orji-Ben (NGR); Tania D'Aguiar (RSA) |
| −52 kg | Salima Souakri (ALG) | Liezl Downing (RSA) | Louise Stephanie Zeh (CMR); Naina Cecilia Ravaoarisoa (MAD) |
| −56 kg | Lynda Mekzine (ALG) | Augustine Ndzouli Ndoumbe (CMR) | Melanie Seidler (RSA); Maryann Ekeada (NGR) |
| −61 kg | Henriette Möller (RSA) | Oukid Ourida (ALG) | Bilkisu Yusif (NGR); Souad Benabdellah (MAR) |
| −66 kg | Sally Buckton (RSA) | Lea Zahoui Blavo (CIV) | Hanitra Razanamalala (MAD); Saida Dhahri (TUN) |
| −72 kg | Melanie Engoang (GAB) | Ngo Batang Donna (CMR) | Marie Michelle St Louis (MRI); Fatima El Miftah (MAR) |
| +72 kg | Samira Chhab (MAR) | Adja Marieme Diop (SEN) | Goua Lou Yalo (CIV); Sonia Ghorbel (TUN) |
| Open | Adja Marieme Diop (SEN) | Sonia Ghorbel (TUN) | Samira Chhab (MAR); Sally Buckton (RSA) |

=== Medal table ===
| Rank | Nation | Gold | Silver | Bronze | Total |
|---|---|---|---|---|---|
| 1 | Algeria (ALG) | 6 | 3 | 1 | 10 |
| 2 | Morocco (MAR) | 4 | 1 | 4 | 9 |
| 3 | South Africa (RSA) | 2 | 1 | 4 | 7 |
| 4 | Cameroon (CMR) | 1 | 2 | 4 | 7 |
| 5 | Senegal (SEN) | 1 | 2 | 1 | 4 |
| 6 | Egypt (EGY) | 1 | 1 | 2 | 4 |
| 7 | Gabon (GAB) | 1 | 0 | 0 | 1 |
| 8 | Tunisia (TUN) | 0 | 3 | 4 | 7 |
| 9 | Mauritius (MRI) | 0 | 1 | 4 | 5 |
| 10 | Ivory Coast (CIV) | 0 | 1 | 2 | 3 |
| 10 | Madagascar (MAD) | 0 | 1 | 2 | 3 |
| 12 | Nigeria (NGR) | 0 | 0 | 3 | 3 |
| Totals (12 entries) | | 16 | 16 | 31 | 63 |
