= Soraya Haddad =

Algerian judoka (born 1984)

Personal information
- Nationality: Algerian
- Born: 30 September 1984 (age 41) El Kseur, Algeria
- Occupation: Judoka

Sport
- Country: Algeria
- Sport: Judo
- Weight class: –48 kg, –52 kg

Achievements and titles
- Olympic Games: (bronze) (2008)
- World Champ.: (bronze) (2005)
- African Champ.: (gold) (2004, 2005, 2008, 2011, 2012)
Medal record
Women's judo
Representing Algeria
Olympic Games
Bronze medal – third place	2008 Beijing	‍–‍52 kg
World Championships
Bronze medal – third place	2005 Cairo	‍–‍48 kg
African Games
Gold medal – first place	2011 Maputo	‍–‍52 kg
Bronze medal – third place	2007 Algiers	‍–‍52 kg
African Championships
Gold medal – first place	2004 Tunis	‍–‍48 kg
Gold medal – first place	2005 Port Elizabeth	‍–‍48 kg
Gold medal – first place	2008 Agadir	‍–‍52 kg
Gold medal – first place	2011 Dakar	‍–‍52 kg
Gold medal – first place	2012 Agadir	‍–‍52 kg
Bronze medal – third place	2002 Cairo	‍–‍48 kg
World Masters
Bronze medal – third place	2012 Almaty	‍–‍52 kg
IJF Grand Slam
Silver medal – second place	2011 Paris	‍–‍52 kg
IJF Grand Prix
Gold medal – first place	2010 Düsseldorf	‍–‍52 kg
Gold medal – first place	2011 Amsterdam	‍–‍52 kg
Mediterranean Games
Gold medal – first place	2005 Almeria	‍–‍52 kg
Pan Arab Games
Bronze medal – third place	2011 Doha	‍–‍52 kg

Profile at external databases
- IJF: 15618
- JudoInside.com: 27311
- Updated on 30 May 2023

Soraya Haddad (born 30 September 1984) is an Algerian judoka. She won a bronze medal in the ‍–‍52 kg weight class at the 2008 Summer Olympics. She has been the African champion five times: 2004, 2005, 2008, 2011 and 2012, and also a bronze medalist in the ‍–‍48 kg category in the 2005 World Championships in Egypt. She was born in El-Kseur, Algeria.
