= Esther Augustine =

Nigerian judoka

Personal information
- Full name: Esther Augustine
- Nationality: Nigeria
- Born: 8 July 1987 (age 38) Nigeria

Sport
- Sport: Judo
- Event: 63 kg
Medal record
Women's judo
Representing Nigeria
African Judo Championships
Bronze medal – third place	2008 Agadir	63 kg
All-Africa Games
Silver medal – second place	2011 Maputo	63 kg
Africa Open
Gold medal – first place	2011 Port Louis	U63 kg

Esther Augustine (born 8 July 1987) is a Nigerian judoka who competed in the women's category. She won a silver medal at the 2011 All-Africa Games and a bronze medal at the 2008 African Judo Championships. She won the African Open Port Louis U63kg in 2013.

== Sports career ==
At the 2008 African Judo Championships in Agadir, Morocco, Augustine competed in the 63kg event and won a bronze medal.

At the Africa Games held in Maputo, Mozambique. She won a silver medal in the 63kg event. She also won the African Open that held in Port Louis after participating in the U63kg event.
