= Djegui Bathily =

Senegalese judoka

Personal information
- Nationality: Senegalese
- Born: 25 February 1977 (age 49)
- Occupation: Judoka
- Weight: 141 kg (311 lb)

Sport
- Sport: Judo
- Event: +100 kg
Medal record
Men's judo
Representing Senegal
All-Africa Games
Silver medal – second place	2007 Algiers	Open
Bronze medal – third place	2007 Algiers	+100 kg
African Championships
Bronze medal – third place	2008 Agadir	+100 kg

Profile at external databases
- JudoInside.com: 40735

Djegui Bathily (born February 25, 1977) is a Senegalese judoka, who played for the heavyweight category. He won two bronze medals for his division at the 2007 All-Africa Games in Algiers, Algeria, and at the 2008 African Judo Championships in Agadir, Morocco.

Bathily represented Senegal at the 2008 Summer Olympics in Beijing, where he competed for the men's heavyweight class (+100 kg). He received a bye for the second preliminary round, before losing out, by two yuko and a non-combativity technique (P29), to U.S. judoka Daniel McCormick.
