= Judo at the 2001 Mediterranean Games =

- Location: Tunis, Tunisia
- Dates: 28 June to 1 July 2001

The judo competition at the 2001 Mediterranean Games was held in Tunis, Tunisia, from 28 June to 1 July 2001.

== Medal overview ==
=== Men ===
Event	Gold	Silver	Bronze
60 kg	(Tunisia) Anis Lounifi	(Italy) Giovanni Carella	(Morocco) Abdelouahed Chorfi (Spain) Roberto Cueto
66 kg	(France) Benjamin Darbelet	(Serbia and Montenegro) Miloš Mijalković	(Italy) Donato Erra (Algeria) Amar Meridja
73 kg	(France) Christophe Massina	(Turkey) Deniz Şilli	(Algeria) Noureddine Yagoubi (Egypt) Haithan El Hossainy
81 kg	(Italy) Roberto Meloni	(Algeria) Salim Boutabcha	(Egypt) Aboumedan El Sayed (Federal Republic of Yugoslavia) Andrija Đurišić
90 kg	(France) Vincenzo Carabetta	(Algeria) Khaled Meddah	(Greece) Yiannis Tsaparas (Spain) David Alarza
100 kg	(Egypt) Bassel El Gharbawy	(France) Christophe Lagarde	(Italy) Michele Monti (Tunisia) Sadok Khalgui
+100 kg	(Italy) Denis Braidotti	(Algeria) Mohammed Bouaichaoui	(France) Matthieu Bataille (Tunisia) Anis Chedly

=== Women ===
Event	Gold	Silver	Bronze
48 kg	(Turkey) Neşe Şensoy	(Italy) Giuseppina Macrì	(France) Sarah Nichilo (Tunisia) Hajer Barhoumi
52 kg	(Algeria) Salima Souakri	(Italy) Antonia Cuomo	(Slovenia) Petra Nareks (France) Virginie Marie
57 kg	(Italy) Cinzia Cavazzuti	(Tunisia) Karima Dhaouadi	(Algeria) Lynda Mekzine (France) Fanny Riaboff
63 kg	(Italy) Ylenia Scapin	(France) Lucie Décosse	(Algeria) Zoubida Bouyacoub (Tunisia) Fatma M'Badra
70 kg	(Slovenia) Raša Sraka	(Algeria) Rachida Ouardane	(France) Amina Abdellatif (Spain) Cecilia Blanco
78 kg	(Italy) Lucia Morico	(France) Sandra Borderieux	(Spain) Henar Parra (Tunisia) Houda Ben Daya
+78 kg	(Egypt) Heba Hefny	(Italy) Clementina Papa	(Serbia and Montenegro) Mara Kovačević (Spain) Susana Somolinos

=== Medal table ===
Rank	Nation	Gold	Silver	Bronze	Total
1	Italy	5	4	2	11
2	France	3	3	5	11
3	Egypt	2	0	2	4
4	Algeria	1	4	4	9
5	Tunisia	1	1	5	7
6	Turkey	1	1	0	2
7	Slovenia	1	0	1	2
8	Serbia and Montenegro	0	1	2	3
9	Spain	0	0	5	5
10	Greece	0	0	1	1
10	Morocco	0	0	1	1
Totals (11 entries)		14	14	28	56
