= Nesria Jelassi =

Tunisian judoka (born 1989)

Personal information
- Full name: Nesria Al-Jelassi
- Nationality: Tunisia
- Born: 19 August 1989 (age 36)
- Height: 1.56 m (5 ft 1 1/2 in)
- Weight: 56 kg (123 lb)

Sport
- Sport: Judo
- Event(s): 57 kg, 63 kg
Medal record
Women's judo
Representing Tunisia
All-Africa Games
Gold medal – first place	2011 Maputo	57 kg
Silver medal – second place	2007 Algiers	63 kg
African Judo Championships
Gold medal – first place	2008 Agadir	63 kg
Gold medal – first place	2010 Yaounde	57 kg
Silver medal – second place	2011 Dakar	57 kg
Bronze medal – third place	2006 Port Louis	63 kg

Nesria Al-Jelassi (also Nesria Jelassi, Arabic: نسرية الجلاصي; born 19 August 1989) is a Tunisian judoka, who played for the lightweight category. She is a two-time Tunisian judo champion, and a four-time medalist for the 57 and 63 kg classes at the African Judo Championships. She also won a gold medal at the 2011 All-Africa Games in Maputo, Mozambique, and silver at the 2007 All-Africa Games in Algiers, Algeria.

Jelassi represented Tunisia at the 2008 Summer Olympics in Beijing, where she competed for the women's lightweight class (57 kg). She defeated Cuba's Yurisleydis Lupetey in the preliminary round of sixteen, before losing out the quarterfinal match, by an ippon and a tai otoshi (body drop), to Australian judoka and five-time Olympian Maria Pekli. Because her opponent advanced further into the semi-finals, Jelassi offered another shot for the bronze medal by entering the repechage rounds. Unfortunately, she finished only in ninth place, after losing out the second repechage bout to Hungary's Bernadett Baczkó, who successfully scored an ippon and a kuzure kesa gatame (broken scarf hold), at three minutes and twenty-two seconds.
