= Judo at the 1995 All-Africa Games =

Judo competition

Judo Judo at the 1995 All-Africa Games
- Venue: Harare
- Location: Harare, Zimbabwe
- Date: 1995

Competition at external databases
- Links: JudoInside

The 1995 African Judo Championships were the 2nd edition of the African Judo Championships, organised by the African Judo Union and were held in Harare, Zimbabwe 1995.
