= Mounir Benamadi =

Algerian Olympic judoka

Personal information
- Nationality: Algeria
- Born: 5 April 1982 (age 44)
- Occupation: Judoka
- Height: 1.68 m (5 ft 6 in)
- Weight: 66 kg (146 lb)

Sport
- Sport: Judo
- Event: 66 kg
Medal record
Men's judo
Representing Algeria
All-Africa Games
Gold medal – first place	2007 Algiers	66 kg
African Judo Championships
Silver medal – second place	2008 Agadir	66 kg

Profile at external databases
- JudoInside.com: 13192

Mounir Benamadi (Arabic: منير بن أمادي; born April 5, 1982) is an Algerian judoka, who competes in the half-lightweight category. He won a gold medal for his division at the 2007 All-Africa Games in Algiers, and silver at the 2008 African Judo Championships in Agadir.

Benamadi represented Algeria at the 2008 Summer Olympics in Beijing, where he competed for the men's half-lightweight class (66 kg). He defeated Australia's Steven Brown in the first preliminary round, before losing out his next match by a single koka to Uzbekistan's Mirali Sharipov.
