= Bassel El-Gharbawy =

Egyptian judoka

Medal record

Men's judo

All-Africa Games
| Gold medal – first place | 1999 Johannesburg | 100 kg |
| Gold medal – first place | 1999 Johannesburg | Open |

Bassel El-Gharbawy (Egyptian Arabic: باسيل ال جارباوى; born 10 April 1977) is an Egyptian judoka. He competed at three Olympic Games. He is also well known for his judo academy by the name of SUA, achieving 40 medals in their last championship.

== Achievements ==
| Year | Tournament | Place | Weight class |
|---|---|---|---|
| 2006 | African Judo Championships | 1st | Half heavyweight (100 kg) |
| 2005 | African Judo Championships | 1st | Half heavyweight (100 kg) |
| 2005 | Mediterranean Games | 2nd | Half heavyweight (100 kg) |
| 2004 | African Judo Championships | 1st | Half heavyweight (100 kg) |
| 2002 | African Judo Championships | 1st | Half heavyweight (100 kg) |
| 2002 | African Judo Championships | 2nd | Open class |
| 2001 | Mediterranean Games | 1st | Half heavyweight (100 kg) |
| 2000 | African Judo Championships | 1st | Half heavyweight (100 kg) |
| 2000 | African Judo Championships | 1st | Open class |
| 1999 | All-Africa Games | 1st | Half heavyweight (100 kg) |
| 1999 | All-Africa Games | 1st | Open class |
| 1998 | African Judo Championships | 1st | Half heavyweight (100 kg) |
| 1998 | African Judo Championships | 1st | Open class |
| 1996 | African Judo Championships | 1st | Half heavyweight (95 kg) |
| 1996 | African Judo Championships | 3rd | Open class |
