= 1994 African Judo Championships =

Judo competition

1994 Judo African Judo Championships
- Location: Tunisia
- Date: 1994

Competition at external databases
- Links: JudoInside

The 1994 African Judo Championships were the first edition of the African Judo Championships, organised by the African Judo Union and were held in Tunis, Tunisia in 1994.
