= Tennis at the 2007 All-Africa Games =

Tennis was part of the 2007 All-Africa Games competition schedule.

== Results ==
=== Men ===
Event	Gold	Silver	Bronze
Singles	Lamine Ouahab; Algeria	Mohamed Mamoun; Egypt	Abdelhak Hameurlaine; Algeria Mohamed Haythem Abid; Tunisia
Doubles	Lamine Ouahab; Slimane Saoudi; Algeria	Karim Maamoun; Mohamed Mamoun; Egypt	Salifu Mohamed; Menford Danso Owusu; Ghana Mohamed Haythem Abid; Walid Jallali; Tunisia
Team	Algeria	Egypt	Tunisia

=== Women ===
Event	Gold	Silver	Bronze
Singles	Samia Medjahdi; Algeria	Lizaan du Plessis; South Africa	Seheno Razafindramaso; Madagascar Nehal Saleh; Egypt
Doubles	Samia Medjahdi; Assia Halo; Algeria	Kelly Anderson; Lizaan du Plessis; South Africa	Magy Mikhail; Nehal Saleh; Egypt Osaro Amadin; Margriet Olagundoye; Nigeria
Team	Algeria	South Africa	Egypt
