= Susana Somolinos =

Spanish judoka (born 1977)

Susana Somolinos (born 22 August 1977) is a Spanish judoka.

== Achievements ==
Year	Tournament	Place	Weight class
2003	European Championships	5th	Heavyweight (+78 kg)
2001	European Championships	5th	Heavyweight (+78 kg)
2001	Mediterranean Games	3rd	Heavyweight (+78 kg)
2000	European Championships	7th	Open class
