= Rachid Rguig =

Moroccan judoka (born 1980)

Personal information
- Nationality: Morocco
- Born: 1 September 1980 (age 45)
- Weight: 66 kg (146 lb)

Sport
- Sport: Judo
- Event: 66 kg
Medal record
Men's judo
Representing Morocco
African Judo Championships
Silver medal – second place	2009 Port Louis	66 kg
Bronze medal – third place	2008 Agadir	66 kg

Rachid Rguig (Arabic: رشيد رجوغ; born September 1, 1980) is a Moroccan judoka who competed in the half-lightweight category. He won a silver medal in his division at the 2009 African Judo Championships in Port Louis, Mauritius, and bronze at the 2008 African Judo Championships in Agadir, Morocco.

Rguig represented Morocco at the 2008 Summer Olympics in Beijing, where he competed in the men's half-lightweight class (66 kg). He received a bye in the second preliminary round match, before losing out, by an ippon (full point) and a juji gatame (back-lying perpendicular armbar), to France's Benjamin Darbelet. Because his opponent advanced to the final match, Rguig was offered another chance to compete for the bronze medal by entering the repechage rounds. Unfortunately, he was defeated in his first match by Canada's Sasha Mehmedovic, who successfully scored a waza-ari awasete ippon (full point) and a kata gatame (shoulder hold), at two minutes and thirty-six seconds.
