= Judo at the 1997 Mediterranean Games =

Judo competition

- Location: Bari, Italy
- Dates: 24 June 1997

The Judo competition at the 1997 Mediterranean Games was held in Bari, Italy from 24 June 1997.

== Medal overview ==
=== Men ===
Event	Gold	Silver	Bronze
60 kg	(Italy) Girolamo Giovinazzo	(Tunisia) Makrem Ayed	(France) Eric Despezelle (Spain) Óscar Peñas
65 kg	(Turkey) Hüseyin Özkan	(Algeria) Amar Meridja	(France) Ludovic Delacotte (Italy) Marino Cattedra
71 kg	(France) Christophe Gagliano	(Spain) Samuel Salvador	(Morocco) Abdellatif Zaouia (Italy) Giuseppe Maddaloni
78 kg	(Italy) Dario Romano	(Spain) Sergio Doménech	(France) Djamel Bouras (Morocco) Adil Belgaïd
86 kg	(Italy) Michele Monti	(France) Stéphane Nomis	(Spain) Fernando González (Tunisia) Iskander Hachicha
95 kg	(Italy) Luigi Guido	(Slovenia) Damjan Petek	(France) Stéphane Traineau (Federal Republic of Yugoslavia) Dano Pantić
+95 kg	(France) David Douillet	(Turkey) Selim Tataroğlu	(Italy) Denis Braidotti (Spain) Ernesto Pérez

=== Women ===
Event	Gold	Silver	Bronze
48 kg	(France) Frédérique Jossinet	(Federal Republic of Yugoslavia) Leposava Marković	(Spain) Yolanda Soler (Turkey) Gülnigar Gülsaran
52 kg	(France) Marie-Claire Restoux	(Algeria) Salima Souakri	(Italy) Giuseppina Macrì (Spain) Almudena Muñoz
56 kg	(France) Isabelle Magnien	(Italy) Francesca Campanini	(Algeria) Lynda Mekzine (Tunisia) Raoudha Chaari
61 kg	(Spain) Sara Álvarez	(France) Karine Petit	(Tunisia) Nesria Traki (Turkey) Neşe Yazıcı
66 kg	(Italy) Emanuela Pierantozzi	(France) Isabelle Beauruelle	(Turkey) Gamze Sakızlıgil (Federal Republic of Yugoslavia) Nada Ognjenović
72 kg	(France) Estha Essombe	(Italy) Ylenia Scapin	(Turkey) Zarife Yıldırım (Spain) Beatriz Martin
+72 kg	(France) Céline Lebrun	(Egypt) Heba Hefny	(Italy) Donata Burgatta (Federal Republic of Yugoslavia) Mara Kovačević

=== Medal table ===
Rank	Nation	Gold	Silver	Bronze	Total
1	France	7	3	4	14
2	Italy	5	2	5	12
3	Spain	1	2	6	9
4	Turkey	1	1	4	6
5	Algeria	0	2	1	3
6	Tunisia	0	1	3	4
6	Yugoslavia	0	1	3	4
8	Egypt	0	1	0	1
8	Slovenia	0	1	0	1
10	Morocco	0	0	2	2
Totals (10 entries)		14	14	28	56
