= Hassane Azzoun =

Algerian Olympic judoka

Personal information
- Nationality: Algeria
- Born: 28 September 1979 (age 46)
- Height: 1.88 m (6 ft 2 in)
- Weight: 100 kg (220 lb)

Sport
- Sport: Judo
- Event: 100 kg
Medal record
Men's judo
Representing Algeria
All-Africa Games
Bronze medal – third place	2007 Algiers	100 kg
African Judo Championships
Gold medal – first place	2008 Agadir	100 kg
Silver medal – second place	2006 Port Louis	100 kg
Silver medal – second place	2009 Port Louis	100 kg
Bronze medal – third place	2004 Tunis	100 kg
Bronze medal – third place	2005 Port Elizabeth	100 kg
Bronze medal – third place	2010 Yaounde	100 kg

Hassane Azzoun (Arabic: حسان عزوننير بن أمادي; born September 28, 1979) is an Algerian judoka, who played for the half-heavyweight category. He is a six-time medalist at the African Judo Championships, and also, a bronze medalist for his division at the 2007 All-Africa Games in Algiers.

At age twenty-nine, Azzoun made his official debut for the 2008 Summer Olympics in Beijing, where he competed for the men's half-heavyweight class (100 kg). He lost his first preliminary match by an ippon and a sode tsurikomi goshi (sleeve lifting and pulling hip throw) to Azerbaijan's Movlud Miraliyev. Because his opponent advanced further into the semi-finals, Azzoun offered another shot for the bronze medal by entering the repechage rounds. He was defeated in his first match by Georgia's Levan Zhorzholiani, who successfully scored an ippon and a kuzure kami shiho gatame (seven mat holds), at three minutes and fifty-four seconds.
