= Samah Ramadan =

Egyptian Olympic judoka (born 1978)

Personal information
- Full name: Samah Ramadan Mohamed
- Nationality: Egypt
- Born: 16 April 1978 (age 48) Cairo, Egypt
- Occupation: Judoka
- Height: 1.86 m (6 ft 1 in)
- Weight: 76 kg (168 lb)

Sport
- Sport: Judo
- Event: +78 kg
- Club: Hiliopolis Club Cairo
- Coached by: Adel Mostafa
Medal record
Women's judo
Representing Egypt
All-Africa Games
Gold medal – first place	2007 Algiers	+78 kg
African Championships
Gold medal – first place	2001 Tripoli	+78 kg
Gold medal – first place	2005 Port Elizabeth	+78 kg
Gold medal – first place	2006 Port Louis	+78 kg
Silver medal – second place	2004 Tunis	+78 kg
Bronze medal – third place	2009 Port Louis	+78 kg

Profile at external databases
- IJF: 6124
- JudoInside.com: 8834

Samah Ramadan Mohamed (also Samah Ramadan, Arabic: سماح رمضان محمد; born April 16, 1978, in Cairo) is an Egyptian judoka, who played for the women's heavyweight category. She is a two-time Olympian, and a five-time medalist at the African Judo Championships. She also defeated Nigeria's Adijat Ayuba for the gold medal in the 78 kg class at the 2007 All-Africa Games in Algiers, Algeria.

Ramadan made her official debut for the 2004 Summer Olympics in Athens, where she lost the first preliminary round match of the women's heavyweight class (+78 kg), by an ippon and a soto makikomi (outer wraparound), to Russia's Tea Donguzashvili. Ramadan later qualified for the repechage rounds, but she was beaten in her first match by South Korea's Choi Sook-Ie.

At the 2008 Summer Olympics in Beijing, Ramadan competed for the second time in the women's +78 kg class. She received a bye for the second preliminary round, before losing out again this time to Cuba's Idalys Ortiz by an ippon and a seoi nage (shoulder throw). Because her opponent advanced further into the semi-finals, Ramadan offered another for the bronze medal by defeating Australia's Janelle Shepherd in the repechage rounds. She finished only in seventh place, after losing out the final repechage bout to another South Korean judoka Kim Na-Young, who successfully scored a waza-ari-awasete-ippon (two full points), and a kesa-gatame (scarf hold), at three minutes and thirty seconds.
