= Kahina Saidi =

Algerian judoka (born 1984)

Personal information
- Nationality: Algeria
- Born: 17 March 1984 (age 42)
- Occupation: Judoka
- Height: 1.73 m (5 ft 8 in)
- Weight: 63 kg (139 lb)

Sport
- Sport: Judo
- Event: 63 kg
Medal record
Women's judo
Representing Algeria
All-Africa Games
Gold medal – first place	2007 Algiers	63 kg
Bronze medal – third place	2011 Maputo	63 kg
Mediterranean Games
Bronze medal – third place	2009 Pescara	63 kg
African Judo Championships
Gold medal – first place	2010 Yaounde	63 kg
Silver medal – second place	2008 Agadir	63 kg
Silver medal – second place	2011 Dakar	63 kg
Bronze medal – third place	2012 Agadir	63 kg

Profile at external databases
- IJF: 758
- JudoInside.com: 45664

Kahina Saidi (Arabic: كهينة سعيدي; born March 17, 1984) is an Algerian judoka, who played for the half-middleweight category. She is a four-time medalist at the African Judo Championships and a bronze medalist at the 2009 Mediterranean Games in Pescara, Italy. She also won two medals in the same division at the 2007 All-Africa Games in Algiers and at the 2011 All-Africa Games in Maputo, Mozambique.

Saidi represented Algeria at the 2008 Summer Olympics in Beijing, where she competed for the women's half-middleweight class (63 kg). She defeated Malta's Marcon Bezzina in the first preliminary round, before losing out her next match by an ippon and a juji gatame (back-lying perpendicular armbar) to Netherlands' Elisabeth Willeboordse, who eventually won the bronze medal in this event.
