= Judo at the 2009 Mediterranean Games =

Judo competition

- Location: Pescara, Italy
- Dates: 2 to 5 July 2009

The Judo Competition at the 2009 Mediterranean Games were held in Pescara, Italy from 2 to 5 July 2009.

== Medal overview ==
=== Men ===
Event	Gold	Silver	Bronze
60 kg	(Italy) Elio Verde	(Monaco) Yann Siccardi	(Greece) Dimoukritos Manousaridis (Syria) Fadi Darwish
66 kg	(Serbia) Miloš Mijalković	(Egypt) Ahmed Awad	(Italy) Francesco Faraldo (Slovenia) Rok Drakšič
73 kg	(Italy) Giovanni Di Cristo	(France) Mohamed Riad	(Spain) Kiyoshi Uematsu (Turkey) Sezer Huysuz
81 kg	(Slovenia) Aljaž Sedej	(Egypt) Hatem Abd el Akher	(Morocco) Safouane Attaf (Italy) Antonio Ciano
90 kg	(Greece) Ilias Iliadis	(Morocco) Mohamed El Assri	(Italy) Lorenzo Bagnoli (Algeria) Lyes Bouyacoub
100 kg	(Egypt) Ramadan Darwish	(France) Cyrille Maret	(Bosnia and Herzegovina) Amel Mekić (Algeria) Amar Benikhlef
+100 kg	(France) Teddy Riner	(Tunisia) Anis Chedly	(Egypt) Islam El Shehaby (Spain) Ángel Parra

=== Women ===
Event	Gold	Silver	Bronze
48 kg	(Italy) Elena Moretti	(Tunisia) Chahnez M'barki	(France) Laëtitia Payet (Turkey) Derya Cibir
52 kg	(Tunisia) Hajer Barhoumi	(Italy) Rosalba Forciniti	(Slovenia) Petra Nareks (Spain) Ana Carrascosa
57 kg	(Greece) Ioulietta Boukouvala	(France) Barbara Harel	(Algeria) Lila Latrous (Slovenia) Tina Trstenjak
63 kg	(Slovenia) Urška Žolnir	(France) Irène Chevrouil	(Greece) Dimitra Androutsu (Algeria) Kahina Saidi
70 kg	(France) Marie Pasquet	(Slovenia) Raša Sraka	(Spain) Leire Iglesias (Italy) Erica Barbieri
78 kg	(France) Lucie Louette	(Tunisia) Houda Miled	(Spain) Raquel Prieto (Algeria) Rachida Ouerdane
+78 kg	(Slovenia) Lucija Polavder	(Bosnia and Herzegovina) Larisa Cerić	(Turkey) Gulsah Kocaturk (Tunisia) Nihal Chikhrouhou

=== Medal table ===
Rank	Nation	Gold medal	Silver medal	Bronze medal	Total
1	France	3	4	1	8
2	Italy	3	1	4	8
3	Slovenia	3	1	3	7
4	Greece	2	0	2	4
5	Tunisia	1	3	1	5
6	Egypt	1	2	1	4
7	Serbia	1	0	0	1
8	Bosnia and Herzegovina	0	1	1	2
8	Morocco	0	1	1	2
10	Monaco	0	1	0	1
11	Algeria	0	0	5	5
11	Spain	0	0	5	5
13	Turkey	0	0	3	3
14	Syria	0	0	1	1
Total		14	14	28	56
