= 2005 African Judo Championships =

Judo competition

2005 Judo African Judo Championships
- Venue: Gqeberha
- Location: South Africa
- Date: 2005

Competition at external databases
- Links: JudoInside

The 2005 African Judo Championships were the 26th edition of the African Judo Championships, and were held in Port Elizabeth, South Africa from 18 May to 21 May 2005.

== Medal overview ==
=== Men ===
Event	Gold	Silver	Bronze
60 kg	(Algeria) Omar Rebahi	(South Africa) Bulelani Makhoba	(Burkina Faso) Hermann Zoungrana (Tunisia) Ziad Mahjoub
66 kg	(Algeria) Amar Meridja	(Niger) Abdou Alassane Dji Bo	(Egypt) Shady Dawah (Tunisia) Anis Lounifi
73 kg	(Algeria) Mohamed Mahchouche	(South Africa) Chris Sadie	(Nigeria) Bashiru Nsa (Tunisia) Anis Dkhili
81 kg	(Tunisia) Youssef Badra	(Senegal) Baye Diawara	(Algeria) Abderahmen Benamadi (Morocco) Safouane Attaf
90 kg	(Algeria) Khaled Meddah	(Egypt) Hesham Mesbah	(Morocco) Mohamed El Asri (Ivory Coast) Amadou Kanate
100 kg	(Egypt) Bassel El Gharabawy	(Senegal) Bara Ndiaye	(Morocco) Mourad Laiti (Algeria) Hacene Azzoun
+100 kg	(Tunisia) Anis Chedly	(Egypt) Islam El Shehaby	(South Africa) Justin Goosen (Algeria) Mohamed Bouaichaoui
Open class	(Algeria) Mohamed Bouaichaoui	(Egypt) Islam El Shehaby	(Morocco) Mohammed Merbah (Tunisia) Anis Chedly
Team	Algeria	Tunisia	Morocco

=== Women ===
Event	Gold	Silver	Bronze
48 kg	(Algeria) Soraya Haddad	(Tunisia) Chahinez M'Barki	(Gabon) Sandrine Ilendou (Madagascar) Martine Randriamalalaniana
52 kg	(Tunisia) Hajer Barhoumi	(Algeria) Linda Mekzine	(Morocco) Asmae Naqouss (Senegal) Hortense Diedhiou
57 kg	(Algeria) Lila Latrous	(Nigeria) Fummilola Adebayo	(Morocco) Fatima Zahra Aït Ali (Tunisia) Khaoula Jouini
63 kg	(Senegal) Fanta Keita	(Algeria) Radia Boubrioua	(Nigeria) Cathrine Ewa (Tunisia) Chadlia Ghliss
70 kg	(Angola) Antonia Moreira	(Tunisia) Yousra Zribi	(Algeria) Kahina Hadid (Senegal) Gisèle Mendy
78 kg	(Tunisia) Houda Miled	(South Africa) Sharlene Laishley	(Algeria) Chahla Atailia none
+78 kg	(Egypt) Samah Ramadan	(Tunisia) Insaf Yahyaoui	(Senegal) Aminata Diatta none
Open class	(Egypt) Samah Ramadan	(Tunisia) Insaf Yahyaoui	none none
Team	Algeria	Tunisia	Senegal

=== Medal table ===
Rank	Nation	Gold	Silver	Bronze	Total
1	Algeria	9	2	5	16
2	Tunisia	4	6	6	16
3	Egypt	3	3	1	7
4	Senegal	1	2	4	7
5	Angola	1	0	0	1
6	South Africa	0	3	1	4
7	Nigeria	0	1	2	3
8	Niger	0	1	0	1
9	Morocco	0	0	7	7
10	Burkina Faso	0	0	1	1
10	Gabon	0	0	1	1
10	Ivory Coast	0	0	1	1
10	Madagascar	0	0	1	1
Totals (13 entries)		18	18	30	66
