= Sandrine Ilendou =

Gabonese Olympic judoka

Personal information
- Nationality: Gabon
- Born: 19 November 1983 (age 42)
- Height: 1.60 m (5 ft 3 in)
- Weight: 48 kg (106 lb)

Sport
- Sport: Judo
- Event: 48 kg
Medal record
Women's judo
Representing Gabon
All-Africa Games
Silver medal – second place	2011 Maputo	48 kg
Bronze medal – third place	2007 Algiers	48 kg

Sandrine Ilendou (born November 19, 1983) is a Gabonese judoka, who competed in the extra-lightweight category. She won the bronze medal for her category at the 2007 All-Africa Games in Algiers, Algeria, and silver at the 2011 All-Africa Games in Maputo, Mozambique, losing out to Tunisia's Amani Khalfaoui.

Ilendou represented Gabon at the 2008 Summer Olympics in Beijing, where she competed for the women's 48 kg class. She lost the first preliminary match to Algeria's Meriem Moussa, who was able to score a single yuko at the end of five-minute period.
