= Franck Moussima =

Cameroonian judoka (born 1984)

Personal information
- Born: 23 February 1984 (age 42)
- Occupation: Judoka

Sport
- Sport: Judo
Medal record
Men's Judo
Representing Cameroon
All-Africa Games
| Gold medal – first place | 2007 Algiers | 100 kg |
| Gold medal – first place | 2011 Maputo | 100 kg |

Profile at external databases
- IJF: 4293
- JudoInside.com: 33041

Franck Martial Ewane Moussima (born 23 February 1984) is a Cameroonian judoka.

== Achievements ==
| Year | Tournament | Place | Weight class |
|---|---|---|---|
| 2011 | All-Africa Games | 1st | Half heavyweight (100 kg) |
| 2008 | African Judo Championships | 3rd | Half heavyweight (100 kg) |
| 2007 | All-Africa Games | 1st | Half heavyweight (100 kg) |
| 2007 | Universiade | 2nd | Half heavyweight (100 kg) |
| 2004 | African Judo Championships | 3rd | Half heavyweight (100 kg) |

Olympic Games
| Preceded by Vencelas Dabaya | Flagbearer for Cameroon; Beijing 2008 | Succeeded by Annabelle Ali |
