= Rachida Ouerdane =

Algerian judoka (born 1979)

Personal information
- Nationality: Algeria
- Born: 2 May 1979 (age 47)
- Occupation: Judoka
- Height: 168 cm (5 ft 6 in)
- Weight: 70 kg (154 lb)

Sport
- Sport: Judo
- Event: 70 kg
Medal record
Women's judo
Representing Algeria
All-Africa Games
Gold medal – first place	2007 Algiers	70 kg
Mediterranean Games
Silver medal – second place	2001 Tunis	70 kg
Bronze medal – third place	2009 Pescara	70 kg
African Judo Championships
Gold medal – first place	2004 Tunis	70 kg
Gold medal – first place	2006 Port Louis	70 kg
Gold medal – first place	2008 Agadir	70 kg
Silver medal – second place	2001 Tripoli	70 kg
Bronze medal – third place	2000 Algiers	70 kg

Profile at external databases
- IJF: 757
- JudoInside.com: 10446

Rachida Ouerdane (Arabic: رشيدة وردان; born 2 May 1979) is an Algerian judoka, who competed in the middleweight category. She is a three-time champion at the African Judo Championships, and a two-time medalist at the Mediterranean Games. She also won a gold medal in the same division at the 2007 All-Africa Games in Algiers.

Ouerdane made her official debut for the 2004 Summer Olympics in Athens, where she lost the first preliminary match of women's middleweight class (70 kg), with a waza-ari (half-point) and a kosoto gake (small outer hook), to China's Qin Dongya.

At the 2008 Summer Olympics in Beijing, Ouerdane competed for the second time in the women's 70 kg class. She received a bye for the second preliminary round, before losing out by a waza-ari to Netherlands' Edith Bosch. Because her opponent advanced further into the semi-finals, Ouerdane was offered another shot for the bronze medal by defeating Fiji's Sisilia Nasiga, with an ippon and a sankaku gatame (arm crush triangular arm lock), in the first repechage bout. However, she finished in ninth place, after losing out the second repechage bout to United States' Ronda Rousey, who successfully scored an ippon and a kuzure-kesa-gatame (broken scarf mat hold), in two minutes.
