= 2008 African Judo Championships =

Judo competition

2008 Judo African Judo Championships
- Venue: Agadir
- Location: Morocco
- Date: 2008

Competition at external databases
- Links: JudoInside

The 2008 African Judo Championships were the 29th edition of the African Judo Championships, and were held in Agadir, Morocco in May 2008.

== Medal overview ==
=== Men ===
Event	Gold	Silver	Bronze
60 kg	(Morocco) Younes Ahamdi	(Madagascar) Elie Norbert	(Algeria) Omar Rebahi (Egypt) Mahmoud El Sayed
66 kg	(Egypt) Amin El Hady	(Algeria) Mounir Benamadi	(Morocco) Rachid Rguig (South Africa) Gideon van Zyl
73 kg	(Algeria) Amar Meridja	(Democratic Republic of the Congo) Eric Kibanza	(South Africa) Marlon August (Mauritius) MacLeon Paulin
81 kg	(Morocco) Safouane Attaf	(South Africa) Matthew Jago	(Tunisia) Yousef Badra (Algeria) Abderahmane Benamadi
90 kg	(Algeria) Amar Benikhlef	(Egypt) Hesham Mesbah	(South Africa) Patrick Trezise (Morocco) Mohamed El Asri
100 kg	(Algeria) Hassene Azzoune	(Libya) Mohamed Ben Saleh	(Cameroon) Franck Moussima (Tunisia) Sami Souissi
+100 kg	(Tunisia) Anis Chedly	(Egypt) Islam El Shehaby	(Morocco) Mohamed Merbah (Senegal) Djeguy Bathily
Open class	(Egypt) Islam El Shehaby	(Tunisia) Anis Chedly	(Cameroon) Dieudonné Dolassem (Algeria) Ammar Belgacem

=== Women ===
Event	Gold	Silver	Bronze
48 kg	(Tunisia) Chahnez M'barki	(Algeria) Meriem Moussa	(Madagascar) Martine Randriamalalaniana (Democratic Republic of the Congo) Elsa Honorine Oyama Enye
52 kg	(Algeria) Soraya Haddad	(Tunisia) Amani Khalfaoui	(Senegal) Hortense Diedhiou (Nigeria) Justina Erez Agatahi
57 kg	(Algeria) Lila Latrous	(Tunisia) Hajer Barhoumi	(Senegal) Fary Seye (Madagascar) Beby Mahita
63 kg	(Tunisia) Nesrine Jlassi	(Algeria) Kahina Saidi	(Morocco) Aida Alioualla (Nigeria) Esther Augustine
70 kg	(Algeria) Rachida Ouardane	(Senegal) Gisèle Mendy	(Angola) Antonia Moreira (Morocco) Hassania El Azzar
78 kg	(Tunisia) Houda Miled	(Nigeria) Vivian Yusuf	(Algeria) Souhir Madani (Cameroon) Christelle Okdombe
+78 kg	(Tunisia) Nihel Cheikh Rouhou	(Egypt) Samah Ramadan	(Morocco) Salima Baazizi (Senegal) Racky Bolly
Open class	(Tunisia) Nihel Cheikh Rouhou	(Egypt) Samah Ramadan	(Cameroon) Christelle Okodombe Foguing (Mauritius) Christina Herbu

=== Medals table ===
Rank	Nation	Gold	Silver	Bronze	Total
1	Algeria	6	3	4	13
2	Tunisia	6	3	2	11
3	Egypt	2	4	1	7
4	Morocco	2	0	6	8
5	Senegal	0	1	4	5
6	South Africa	0	1	3	4
7	Madagascar	0	1	2	3
7	Nigeria	0	1	2	3
9	DR Congo	0	1	1	2
10	Libya	0	1	0	1
11	Cameroon	0	0	4	4
12	Mauritius	0	0	2	2
13	Angola	0	0	1	1
Totals (13 entries)		16	16	32	64
