= Lila Latrous =

Algerian judoka (born 1979)

Personal information
- Nationality: Algeria
- Born: 15 July 1979 (age 47)
- Occupation: Judoka
- Height: 1.55 m (5 ft 1 in)
- Weight: 57 kg (126 lb)

Sport
- Sport: Judo
- Event: 57 kg
Medal record
Women's judo
Representing Algeria
All-Africa Games
Gold medal – first place	2007 Algiers	57 kg
Mediterranean Games
Bronze medal – third place	2009 Pescara	57 kg
African Judo Championships
Gold medal – first place	2004 Tunis	57 kg
Gold medal – first place	2005 Port Elizabeth	57 kg
Gold medal – first place	2008 Agadir	57 kg
Gold medal – first place	2009 Port Louis	57 kg

Profile at external databases
- IJF: 756
- JudoInside.com: 11160

Lila Latrous (Arabic: ليلى لتروس; born July 15, 1979) is an Algerian judoka, who competes in the lightweight category. She is a four-time champion at the African Judo Championships, and a bronze medalist at the 2009 Mediterranean Games in Pescara, Italy. She also won a gold medal in the same division at the 2007 All-Africa Games in Algiers.

Latrous made her official debut for the 2004 Summer Olympics in Athens, where she lost the first preliminary match of women's lightweight class (57 kg), with an ippon and an okuri eri jime (sliding lapel strangle), to former Olympic bronze medalist Liu Yuxiang.

At the 2008 Summer Olympics in Beijing, Latrous competed for the second time in the women's 57 kg class. She lost again the first preliminary match by an ippon to another Chinese judoka Xu Yan. Unlike her previous Olympics, Latrous was offered another shot for the bronze medal by entering the repechage rounds. She was defeated in the first match by Finland's Nina Koivumäki, who successfully scored a koka and a golden score within the five-minute period.
