= Insaf Yahyaoui =

Tunisian judoka (born 1981)

Personal information
- Born: 3 January 1981 (age 45)
- Occupation: Judoka

Sport
- Sport: Judo

Profile at external databases
- JudoInside.com: 9022

Insaf Yahyaoui (born January 3, 1981) is a Tunisian judoka.

She finished in joint fifth place in the heavyweight (+78 kg) division at the 2004 Summer Olympics, having lost the bronze medal match to Tea Donguzashvili of Russia.
