= Waza-ari =

Second best score in Japanese martial arts

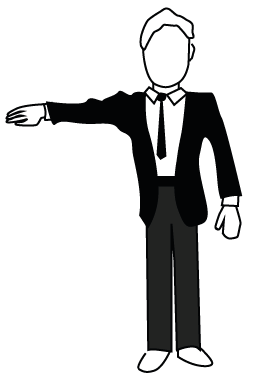
Referee signaling waza-ari

Waza-ari (技あり; lit. "having skill") is the second highest score a fighter can achieve in a Japanese martial arts ippon or waza-ari contest, usually judo, karate, or jujutsu.

== Waza-ari in judo ==
A waza-ari is the second highest score a fighter can achieve in judo, the others formerly being a yuko (advantage) and a koka. An ippon would be the highest score that, once awarded, ends the match in favor of the athlete who scored it. The referee raises his arm laterally parallel to the ground to award waza-ari. Its value is higher than any other sum or combination of lower scores. No matter how many yuko or koka, when time runs out, a waza-ari still counts more.

In judo, a waza-ari is awarded after an action in which the opponent is thrown with control and accuracy, but not to the extent of an ippon, or held on the back for between 15 and 20 seconds on the mat. To achieve an ippon, four elements are required: landing the opponent with a judo technique on the mat flat on the back, with force, speed, and control. If one out of the four elements is not expressed or is expressed poorly, the referee can still award the waza-ari.

With the old rules (until 2013) it could also be awarded as a penalty, formerly named keikoku. A penalty can be given for infractions such as non-combativity, improper hold, false attacks, etc.. In judo, penalties are always awarded in a progressive way, e.g. first infraction – first penalty (shido), second infraction - second penalty (chiui), third infraction – third penalty (keikoku), fourth infraction - disqualification (hansoku make; see ippon).

Except for 2017, waza-ari is the only cumulative score in judo, so that if an athlete scored two waza-ari during a bout, they each count for half an ippon, thus giving victory to the athlete. To signal this, the referee raises his arm laterally parallel to the ground to award the second waza-ari and then continues rising the arm vertically as if to mark an ippon, saying "Waza-ari, awasete ippon", before ending the match ("Sore made"). For about one year, with some new rules introduced in 2017, waza-ari no longer accumulated towards ippon, however, if no ippon was scored, waza-ari determined the winner. Then, in 2018, the rule that two waza-ari combine to make ippon was reinstated. Scores lower than waza-ari are no longer awarded.

== Waza-ari in karate ==
In many styles of karate competition or shiai, a score of waza-ari is awarded to a competitor that successfully strikes an opponent within the rules of the competition, but in a way that is not considered to overpower the opponent sufficiently to end the match.

In the shobu ippon kumite practiced by the Japan Karate Association and its offshoots, waza-ari is awarded when a strike makes contact with the opponent but without fulfilling all of the criteria for a decisive strike, either due to the target area, distance, focus or other judging criteria.

In knockdown kumite as practiced by offshoots of the kyokushinkaikan organizations, waza-ari is awarded for a blow that temporarily stuns the opponent but does not render them unable to continue for longer than three seconds.
