= 1998 African Judo Championships =

Judo competition

1998 Judo African Judo Championships
- Venue: Dakar
- Location: Senegal
- Date: 1998

Competition at external databases
- Links: JudoInside

The 1998 African Judo Championships were the 20th edition of the African Judo Championships, organised by the African Judo Union and were held in Dakar, Senegal from 23 July 1998 to 26 July 1998.
