= Judo at the 1999 All-Africa Games =

Judo competition

Judo Judo at the 1999 All-Africa Games
- Venue: Johannesburg
- Location: Johannesburg, South Africa
- Dates: 11–14 September 1999

Competition at external databases
- Links: JudoInside

The 1999 African Judo Championships were the 21st edition of the African Judo Championships, organised by the African Judo Union and were held in Johannesburg, South Africa from 11 September 1999 to 14 September 1999.
