= 2006 African Judo Championships =

Judo competition

2006 Judo African Judo Championships
- Venue: Port Louis
- Location: Mauritius
- Date: 2006

Competition at external databases
- Links: JudoInside

The 2006 African Judo Championships were the 27th edition of the African Judo Championships, and were held in Port-Louis, Mauritius from 29 May 2006 to 6 June 2006.
