= African Judo Championships =

Judo competition

- Current event or competition: 2026 African Judo Championships

Competition details
- Discipline: Judo
- Type: Annual
- Organiser: African Judo Union (AJU)

History
- First edition: 1964 in Dakar, Senegal
- Most wins: Algeria – 320 medals (121 gold medals)
- Most recent: Nairobi 2026
- Next edition: Algiers 2027

African Judo Championships is a continental judo championship organized by the African Judo Union. The 1965, 1987, 1991, 1995, 1999 and 2007 editions were held during the respective African Games.

== Tournaments ==
Year	Date	Host City (Country)	Venue	Countries	Athletes		Events	Winners	Ref.
Year	Date	Host City (Country)	Venue	Countries	Male	Female	Events	Winners	Ref.
1964	...–... Jun	(Senegal) Dakar				-	5	Senegal	
1965 (Note: Edition also served as the African Games event.)	20–22 Jul	(Republic of the Congo) Brazzaville		10		-	5	Senegal	
1967	...–... Jul	(Ivory Coast) Abidjan		6		-	7	Senegal	
1968	...–... Jul	(Tunisia) Tunis		12		-	5	Senegal	
1974	14–16 Dec	(Egypt) Cairo				-		Senegal	
1982	...–... Jul	(Egypt) Cairo				-			
1983	30 Jul–4 Aug	(Senegal) Dakar		5		-	9	Egypt	
1985	6–12 Aug	(Tunisia) Tunis				-	7	Egypt	
1986	20–24 Jul	(Morocco) Casablanca		8			13	Algeria	
1987	3–5 Aug	(Kenya) Nairobi		7		-	8	Egypt	
1989	3–10 Dec	(Ivory Coast) Abidjan			61	32		Algeria	
1990	16–20 Jul	(Algeria) Algiers	Hacène Harcha Arena	16			16	Algeria	
1991	20 Sep–1 Oct	(Egypt) Cairo		11		-	8	Egypt	
1991 (Note: The tournament of 1991 in Port Louis is for women only.)	1–3 Nov	(Mauritius) Port Louis			-		9		
1992	6–8 Nov	(Mauritius) Port Louis		15			16	Algeria	
1993	...–... ...	(Egypt) Cairo	Cairo Stadium Indoor Halls						
1994	7–9 Oct	(Tunisia) Tunis		9			16	Tunisia	
1995	13–23 Sep	(Zimbabwe) Harare		12			16	Tunisia	
1996	16–19 May	(South Africa) Pretoria		10			16	Algeria	
1997	17–19 Jul	(Morocco) Casablanca		12			16	Algeria	
1998	23–26 Jul	(Senegal) Dakar		12			16	Egypt	
1999	10–13 Sep	(South Africa) Johannesburg		21			16	Tunisia	
2000	11–14 May	(Algeria) Algiers	Hacène Harcha Arena				16	Algeria	
2001	6–9 Nov	(Libya) Tripoli					16	Algeria	
2002	4–7 Oct	(Egypt) Cairo					16	Tunisia	
2004	5–8 May	(Tunisia) Tunis					16	Algeria	
2005	18–21 May	(South Africa) Port Elizabeth					16	Algeria	
2006	5–10 Jun	(Mauritius) Port-Louis					16	Egypt	
2007	13–14 Jul	(Algeria) Algiers		24			16	Algeria	
2008	15–18 May	(Morocco) Agadir		22			16	Algeria	
2009	27 Apr–2 May	(Mauritius) Port-Louis					16	Egypt	
2010	15–18 Apr	(Cameroon) Yaoundé		22	105	73	16	Tunisia	
2011	14–17 Apr	(Senegal) Dakar	Marius Ndiaye Stadium	23	113	64	16	Tunisia	
2012	5–8 Apr	(Morocco) Agadir		20			16	Morocco	
2013	18–21 Apr	(Mozambique) Maputo	Pavilhão Gimnodesportivo	22			16	Tunisia	
2014	26–27 Jun	(Mauritius) Port-Louis					16	Algeria	
2015	24–26 Apr	(Gabon) Libreville					16	Tunisia	
2016	8–10 Apr	(Tunisia) Tunis					16	Tunisia	
2017	14–16 Apr	(Madagascar) Antananarivo		22			18	Algeria	
2018	12–15 Apr	(Tunisia) Tunis		25	106	61	16	Tunisia	
2019	25–28 Apr	(South Africa) Cape Town		28			14	Algeria	
2020	17–20 Dec	(Madagascar) Antananarivo	Palais des Sports Mahamasina	33			15	Egypt	
2021	20–23 May	(Senegal) Dakar	Dakar Arena	40			14	Tunisia	
2022	26–29 May	(Algeria) Oran	Convention Centre Mohammed Ben Ahmed	26	94	79	14	Algeria	
2023	7–9 September	(Morocco) Casablanca	Salle du Complexe Sportif Mohammed V	39	131	98	15	Algeria	
2024	25–28 April	(Egypt) Cairo	Cairo Stadium Indoor Halls Complex		103	89	15	Egypt	
2025	25–28 April	(Ivory Coast) Abidjan	Palais des Sports de Treichville				15	Egypt	
2026	24–26 April	(Kenya) Nairobi	Kasarani Indoor Arena	35	160	101	15	Algeria	
2027	23–25 April	(Algeria) Algiers					15		

== Team competitions ==
Mixed teams
Year	Location	Gold	Silver	Bronze		Ref.
2022	Oran, Algeria	Algeria	Senegal	Cameroon	Morocco	
2023	Casablanca, Morocco	Algeria	Morocco	Angola	Cameroon	
2024	Cairo, Egypt	Egypt	Tunisia	Algeria	Angola	
2025	Abidjan, Ivory Coast	Egypt	Algeria	Tunisia	Angola	
2026	Nairobi, Kenya	Egypt	Tunisia	Algeria	Cameroon	

== All-time medal table 2001–2026 ==
Rank	Nation	Gold	Silver	Bronze	Total
1	Algeria	121	94	105	320
2	Tunisia	88	76	111	275
3	Egypt	65	60	67	192
4	Morocco	59	42	101	202
5	Angola	8	11	24	43
6	South Africa	6	13	24	43
7	Guinea	6	1	2	9
8	Guinea-Bissau	6	1	1	8
9	Cameroon	4	24	66	94
10	Senegal	4	14	46	64
11	Mauritius	2	7	12	21
12	Madagascar	2	3	11	16
13	Libya	1	1	4	6
14	Gabon	0	5	11	16
15	Ivory Coast	0	2	17	19
16	Nigeria	0	2	10	12
17	Gambia	0	2	3	5
18	Cape Verde	0	2	1	3
19	Congo	0	1	7	8
20	Ghana	0	1	5	6
21	Burkina Faso	0	1	4	5
22	Burundi	0	1	2	3
22	Niger	0	1	2	3
24	Central African Republic	0	1	1	2
24	Kenya	0	1	1	2
26	Benin	0	1	0	1
27	Zambia	0	0	3	3
28	Chad	0	0	1	1
28	DR Congo	0	0	1	1
28	Djibouti	0	0	1	1
28	Mali	0	0	1	1
28	Seychelles	0	0	1	1
Totals (32 entries)		372	368	646	1,386
