= 2000 African Judo Championships =

Judo competition

2000 Judo African Judo Championships
- Venue: Algiers
- Location: Algeria
- Date: 9 May 2000

Competition at external databases
- Links: JudoInside

The 2000 African Judo Championships were the 22nd edition of the African Judo Championships, organised by the African Judo Union and were held in Algiers, Algeria 9–12 May 2000.

Over 200 judokas from 14 African nations competed in the championships. The tournament offered vital qualification spots for the upcoming 2000 Sydney Olympics, where African representation expanded to allow up to five athletes per weight category (three men and two women), marking a significant growth from previous Olympic cycles.

== Medal table ==
* Host nation (Algeria)

| Rank | Nation | Gold | Silver | Bronze | Total |
|---|---|---|---|---|---|
| 1 | Algeria (ALG)* | 4 | 3 | 3 | 10 |
| 2 | Tunisia (TUN) | 3 | 3 | 9 | 15 |
| 3 | Egypt (EGY) | 3 | 2 | 5 | 10 |
| Totals (3 entries) | | 10 | 8 | 17 | 35 |
