= 2001 African Judo Championships =

Judo competition

2001 Judo African Judo Championships
- Venue: Tripoli
- Location: Libya
- Date: 2001

Competition at external databases
- Links: JudoInside

The 2001 African Judo Championships were organized by the African Judo Union in Tripoli, Libya from 6 Nov 2001 to 9 Nov 2001.
