= 2007 All-Africa Games =

Multi-sport event in Algiers, Algeria

IX All-Africa Games
- Host city: Algiers, Algeria
- Nations: 52
- Events: 24 sports
- Opening: 11 July 2007
- Closing: 23 July 2007
- Opened by: Abdelaziz Bouteflika
- Main venue: Stade 5 Juillet 1962
- Website: coja2007.dz

Location of Algiers in Algeria.

The 9th All-Africa Games (Arabic: الألعاب الأفريقية التاسعة; French: 9e Jeux africains), also known as Algiers 2007 (Arabic: الجزائر 2007), took place from 11 to 23 July 2007 in Algiers, the capital city of Algeria. Algiers became the first city to hold All-Africa Games for a second time. The 1978 All-Africa Games were also held there. Besides Algeria, only Nigeria had hosted the event twice, but with different host cities. 4,793 athletes from 52 nations took part in the 2007 Games.

== Venues ==
- Main stadium - Athletics
- Stade SATO - Para athletics
- Piscine du Complexe Olympique - Swimming
- Hall OMS El Biar - Badminton
- Salle OMS Hydra - Women's Basketball
- Salle Staouali - Men's Basketball
- Salle Harcha - Men's Basketball
- Centre Equestre LIDO - Equestrian
- Centre Equestre de Maramene - Equestrian (Endurance)
- Stand de tir Chenoua - Shooting
- Salle OMS de Bordj-El-Kiffan - Boxing
- Coupole - Judo, Karate, Handball
- Salle OMS de Bousmail - Weightlifting
- Club Tennis OCO - Tennis
- Salle OMS Boumerdes - Kickboxing, Taekwondo
- Barrage de Boukerdane - Rowing
- Salle OMS de Rouiba - Table tennis
- Salle De Bab Ezzouar - Gymnastics
- La Cité des sciences, Théâtre des verdures - Chess
- Salles OMS Ain Benian - Handball
- Salles OMS Ain Taya - Handball
- Salles OMS Tipaza - Handball
- Salle de Boufarik - Wheelchair basketball
- Circuit route Tipaza - Cycling
- Salle de Zeralda - Goalball
- E.N.V Alger plage - Sailing

== Competitions ==
The following 24 sports were competed:

- Athletics
- Badminton
- Basketball
- Boxing
- Chess
- Cycling
- Equestrian
- Fencing
- Football
- Gymnastics
- Handball
- Judo
- Karate
- Kickboxing
- Rowing
- Sailing
- Shooting
- Swimming
- Table tennis
- Taekwondo
- Tennis
- Volleyball
- Weightlifting
- Wrestling

Paralympic sports:

- Goalball
- Para-athletics
- Wheelchair basketball

Three disciplines, Baseball, Softball and Field Hockey were dropped by the hosts, since these sports are hardly played in Algeria and consequently lack suitable facilities. The hockey competition would have doubled as qualifier for the 2008 Summer Olympics in Beijing, thus African Hockey Federation organised a separate olympic qualifying tournament in Nairobi, Kenya, held simultaneously with the All-Africa Games.

Water Polo was not competed due to lack of teams. It was supposed to be an Olympic qualifier.

== Medals ==
* Host nation (Algeria)

Rank	NOC	Gold	Silver	Bronze	Total
1	Egypt (EGY)	74	62	63	199
2	Algeria (ALG)*	70	58	77	205
3	South Africa (SAF)	61	66	53	180
4	Nigeria (NGR)	50	55	54	159
5	Tunisia (TUN)	48	41	58	147
6	Kenya (KEN)	13	15	10	38
7	Senegal (SEN)	8	12	26	46
8	Zimbabwe (ZIM)	7	8	8	23
9	Botswana (BOT)	6	2	5	13
10	Cameroon (CMR)	4	6	17	27
11	Ethiopia	4	5	10	19
11	Libya	4	5	10	19
13	Angola (ANG)	4	1	7	12
14	Ghana (GHA)	3	10	12	25
15	Seychelles (SEY)	3	6	1	10
16	Eritrea (ERI)	3	1	2	6
17	Sudan (SUD)	3	0	1	4
18	Democratic Republic of the Congo (COD)	2	2	1	5
19	Gabon (GAB)	2	1	3	6
20	Zambia (ZAM)	1	2	6	9
21	Lesotho (LES)	1	1	2	4
22	Mali (MLI)	1	0	3	4
23	Uganda (UGA)	1	0	1	2
24	Mozambique (MOZ)	1	0	0	1
25	Ivory Coast (CIV)	0	3	12	15
26	Burkina Faso (BUR)	0	2	1	3
27	Madagascar (MAD)	0	1	3	4
27	Republic of the Congo (CGO)	0	1	3	4
29	Guinea (GUI)	0	1	2	3
29	Malawi (MAW)	0	1	2	3
31	Namibia (NAM)	0	1	1	2
32	São Tomé and Príncipe (STP)	0	1	0	1
32	Tanzania (TAN)	0	1	0	1
32	Togo (TOG)	0	1	0	1
35	Benin (BEN)	0	0	4	4
36	Guinea-Bissau (GBS)	0	0	3	3
37	Central African Republic (CAF)	0	0	1	1
Totals (37 entries)		374	372	462	1,208
