= 2002 African Judo Championships =

Judo competition

2002 Judo African Judo Championships
- Venue: Cairo
- Location: Egypt
- Date: 2002

Competition at external databases
- Links: JudoInside

The 2002 African Judo Championships was organised by the African Judo Union in Cairo, Egypt from 4 October 2002 to 7 October 2002.
