= Kosovo at the 2022 Mediterranean Games =

- IOC code: KOS
- NOC: Olympic Committee of Kosovo

in Oran, Algeria
- Competitors: 38 in 13 sports
- Flag bearers: Egzon Shala; Fortesa Orana
- Medals Ranked 16th: Gold 3 Silver 0 Bronze 3 Total 6

Mediterranean Games appearances (overview)
- 1951; 1955; 1959; 1963; 1967; 1971; 1975; 1979; 1983; 1987; 1991; 1993; 1997; 2001; 2005; 2009; 2013; 2018; 2022

Other related appearances
- Yugoslavia (1951–1991); Serbia and Montenegro (1997–2005); Serbia (2009–pres.)

Kosovo competed at the 2022 Mediterranean Games in Oran, Algeria from 25 June to 6 July 2022.

== Medal summary ==
=== Medal table ===
Medal	Name	Sport	Event	Date
Gold	Distria Krasniqi	Judo	Women's 52 kg	29 June
Gold	Laura Fazliu	Judo	Women's 63 kg	30 June
Gold	Loriana Kuka	Judo	Women's 78 kg	1 July
Bronze	Flaka Loxha	Judo	Women's 57 kg	29 June
Bronze	Akil Gjakova	Judo	Men's 73 kg	30 June
Bronze	Shpejtim Bajoku	Boxing	Men's 63 kg	30 June

Medals by sport
Sport	1st place, gold medalist(s)	2nd place, silver medalist(s)	3rd place, bronze medalist(s)	Total
Boxing	0	0	1	1
Judo	3	0	2	5
Total	3	0	3	6

Medals by date
Day	Date	1st place, gold medalist(s)	2nd place, silver medalist(s)	3rd place, bronze medalist(s)	Total
4	29 June	1	0	1	2
5	30 June	1	0	2	3
Total		3	0	3	6

Medals by gender
Gender	1st place, gold medalist(s)	2nd place, silver medalist(s)	3rd place, bronze medalist(s)	Total
Male	0	0	2	2
Female	3	0	1	4
Total	3	0	3	6

== Archery ==
Men

Athlete	Event	Ranking round		Round of 24	Round of 16	Quarterfinals	Semifinals	Final / BM	
Athlete	Event	Score	Seed	Opposition Score	Opposition Score	Opposition Score	Opposition Score	Opposition Score	Rank
Hazir Asllani	Individual	515	34	Rahlaoui (ALG); L 2–6	did not advance				25
Edi Dvorani	Individual	622	18	Bye	Bariteaud (FRA); L 4–6	did not advance			17
Valmir Gllareva	Individual	614	22	Bye	Paoli (ITA); L 4–6	did not advance			17
Hazir Asllani; Edi Dvorani; Valmir Gllareva	Team	1751	9	—N/a	Cyprus (CYP); L 0–6	Did not advance			9

== Athletics ==
Key

- Note–Ranks given for track events are within the athlete's heat only
- Q = Qualified for the next round
- q = Qualified for the next round as a fastest loser or, in field events, by position without achieving the qualifying target
- NR = National record
- N/A = Round not applicable for the event
- Bye = Athlete not required to compete in round

Men

Track & road events

Athlete	Event	Qualification		Final	
Athlete	Event	Result	Rank	Result	Rank
Astrit Kryeziu	800 m	1:50.57	5	Did not advance	

Field events

Athlete	Event	Qualification		Final	
Athlete	Event	Result	Rank	Result	Rank
Muhamet Ramadani	Shot put	—N/a		18.06	10
Alaudin Suma	Discus throw	—N/a		43.90	14

== Badminton ==
Men

Athlete	Event	Round of 32	Round of 16	Quarterfinals	Semifinals	Final / BM	
Athlete	Event	Opposition Result	Opposition Result	Opposition Result	Opposition Result	Opposition Result	Rank
Rinor Gllareva	Singles	Belarbi (ALG); L (2-21, 1-21)	Did not advance				17

== Boxing ==
Men

Athlete	Event	Round of 16	Quarterfinal	Semifinal	Final	Rank
Bashkim Bajoku	52 kg	Bye	Gümüş (TUR); L 0-3	Did not advance		5
Lorent Murati	57 kg	Joukhdar (SYR); L 1-2	Did not advance			9
Shpetim Bajoku	63 kg	Sassi (TUN); W 3-0	Amen (EGY); W 3-0	Abdelli (ALG); L 1-2	Did not advance	3rd place, bronze medalist(s)
Patriot Behrami	69 kg	El Barbari (MAR); L ABD	Did not advance			9

== Gymnastics ==
=== Artistic ===
Men

Athlete	Event	Qualification								Final							
Athlete	Event	Apparatus						Total	Rank	Apparatus						Total	Rank
Athlete	Event	F	PH	R	V	PB	HB	Total	Rank	F	PH	R	V	PB	HB	Total	Rank
Elvis Citaku	Floor	6.800	—N/a					6.800	40	Did not advance							
Elvis Citaku	Vault	—N/a			11.150	—N/a		11.150	41	Did not advance							

Women

Athlete	Event	Qualification						Final					
Athlete	Event	Apparatus				Total	Rank	Apparatus				Total	Rank
Athlete	Event	V	UB	BB	F	Total	Rank	V	UB	BB	F	Total	Rank
Valeza Rama	Vault	10.150	—N/a			10.150	31	Did not advance					
Valeza Rama	Uneven bars	—N/a	DNS	—N/a		—	—	Did not advance					
Valeza Rama	Floor	—N/a			5.000	5.000	33	Did not advance					

== Judo ==
Men

Athlete	Event	Round of 16	Quarterfinals	Semifinals	Repechage	Final / BM	
Athlete	Event	Opposition Result	Opposition Result	Opposition Result	Opposition Result	Opposition Result	Rank
Akil Gjakova	Men's −73 kg	Bye	Tsoutlasvili (GRE); W 10-00	Dris (ALG); L 00-10	Bye	Lombardo (ITA); W 01-00	3rd place, bronze medalist(s)
Arber Kullashi	Men's −81 kg	Benazoug (ALG); L 00-10	Did not advance				
Shpati Zekaj	Men's −100 kg	Bergamelli (ITA); W 10-00	Kukolj (SRB); L 00-01	Did not advance	Kumrić (CRO); L 00-11	Did not advance	5

Women

Athlete	Event	Round of 16	Quarterfinals	Semifinals	Repechage	Final / BM	
Athlete	Event	Opposition Result	Opposition Result	Opposition Result	Opposition Result	Opposition Result	Rank
Erza Muminoviq	Women's −48 kg	Şentürk (TUR); W 10-00	Vieu (FRA); L 00-10	Did not advance	Bedioui (TUN); L 00-10	Did not advance	7
Distria Krasniqi	Women's −52 kg	Bye	Asvesta (CYP); W 01-00	Pérez (ESP); W 01-00	Bye	Puljiz (CRO); W 11-00	1st place, gold medalist(s)
Flaka Loxha	Women's 57 kg	Bye	Caggiano (ITA); L 00-10	Did not advance	Ruiz (ESP); W 10-00	Bozkurt (TUR); W 01-00	3rd place, bronze medalist(s)
Laura Fazliu	Women's −63 kg	Bye	Oberan (CRO); W 01-00	Belkadi (ALG); W 01-00	Bye	Cabaña (ESP); W 01-00	1st place, gold medalist(s)
Loriana Kuka	Women's −78 kg	Bye	Yılmaz (TUR); W 10-00	Pavić (CRO); W 10-00	Bye	Buttigieg (FRA); W 01-00	1st place, gold medalist(s)

== Karate ==
Men

Athlete	Event	Round of 16	Quarterfinals	Semifinals	Repechage	Final / BM	
Athlete	Event	Opposition Result	Opposition Result	Opposition Result	Opposition Result	Opposition Result	Rank
Elhami Shabani	−75 kg	Busà (ITA); L 0–1	Did not advance				11
Melos Gashi	−84 kg	Makamata (FRA); L 0–3	Did not advance				11

Women

Athlete	Event	Round of 16	Quarterfinals	Semifinals	Repechage	Final / BM	
Athlete	Event	Opposition Result	Opposition Result	Opposition Result	Opposition Result	Opposition Result	Rank
Albulenë Gërvalla	−55 kg	Bye	Charif (FRA); W 3–0	Abouriche (ALG); L 0–7	Bye	Brunori (ITA); L 1–2	5
Adelina Rama	−61 kg	Stylianou (CYP); L 0–2	Did not advance				11
Fortesa Orana	+68 kg	Jemi (TUN); L 3–6	Did not advance				9

== Shooting ==
Kosovo competed in shooting.

Men

Athlete	Event	Qualification		Final	
Athlete	Event	Points	Rank	Points	Rank
Nexhat Sahiti	10 m air pistol	564.0	12	Did not advance	
Drilon Ibrahimi	10 m air rifle	605.4	21	Did not advance	

== Swimming ==
Men

Athlete	Event	Heat		Final	
Athlete	Event	Time	Rank	Time	Rank
Alush Telaku	50 m butterfly	26.74	18	Did not advance	
Alush Telaku	100 m butterfly	59.70	19	Did not advance	
Alush Telaku	200 m butterfly	2:13.84	12	Did not advance	

Women

Athlete	Event	Heat		Final	
Athlete	Event	Time	Rank	Time	Rank
Vanesa Beka	50 m breaststroke	37.14	11	Did not advance	
Vanesa Beka	100 m breaststroke	1:20.87	13	Did not advance	

== Table tennis ==
Men's

Athlete	Event	Round Robin 1		Round Robin 2		Quarterfinals	Semifinals	Final / BM	
Athlete	Event	Opposition Score	Rank	Opposition Score	Rank	Opposition Score	Opposition Score	Opposition Score	Rank
Fatih Karabaxhak	Singles	Rembert (FRA) L 0-4 (6-11, 1-11, 4-11, 4-11); Giardi (SMR) L 2-4 (7-11, 14-12, 8-11, 5-11, 13-11, 4-11); Stoyanov (ITA) L 0-4 (1-11, 6-11, 1-11, 8-11)	4	Did not advance					25
Kreshnik Mahmuti	Singles	Sgouropoulos (GRE) L 0-4 (2-11, 2-11, 5-11, 11-13); Jevtović (SRB) L 0-4 (6-11, 2-11, 2-11, 5-11); Bourass (TUN) L 0-4 (5-11, 8-11, 8-11, 6-11)	4	Did not advance					25

== Taekwondo ==
Men

Athlete	Event	Round of 32	Round of 16	Quarterfinals	Semifinals	Final / BM	
Athlete	Event	Opposition Result	Opposition Result	Opposition Result	Opposition Result	Opposition Result	Rank
Arber Azemi	−68 kg	Bye	Chamalidis (GRE); L 8–18	Did not advance			9
Arber Bajra	−80 kg	—N/a	Husić (BIH); L 3–28	Did not advance			9

== Tennis ==
Men

Athlete	Event	Round of 32	Round of 16	Quarterfinals	Semifinals	Final / BM	
Athlete	Event	Opposition Score	Opposition Score	Opposition Score	Opposition Score	Opposition Score	Rank
Vullnet Tashi	Singles	Ouakaa (TUN); L 3–6, 2–6	Did not advance				

Women

Athlete	Event	Round of 32	Round of 16	Quarterfinals	Semifinals	Final / BM	
Athlete	Event	Opposition Score	Opposition Score	Opposition Score	Opposition Score	Opposition Score	Rank
Vesa Gjinaj	Singles	Bye	Yörük (TUR); L 1–6, 1–6	Did not advance			

== Wrestling ==
Key:

- VT (ranking points: 5–0 or 0–5) – Victory by fall.
- VB (ranking points: 5–0 or 0–5) – Victory by injury (VF for forfeit, VA for withdrawal or disqualification)
- PP (ranking points: 3–1 or 1–3) – Decision by points – the loser with technical points.
- PO (ranking points: 3–0 or 0–3) – Decision by points – the loser without technical points.
- ST (ranking points: 4–0 or 0–4) – Great superiority – the loser without technical points and a margin of victory of at least 8 (Greco-Roman) or 10 (freestyle) points.
- SP (ranking points: 4–1 or 1–4) – Technical superiority – the loser with technical points and a margin of victory of at least 8 (Greco-Roman) or 10 (freestyle) points.

Men's freestyle

Athlete	Event	Round of 16	Quarterfinal	Semifinal	Repechage	Final / BM	
Athlete	Event	Opposition Result	Opposition Result	Opposition Result	Opposition Result	Opposition Result	Rank
Alban Sopa	−74 kg	—N/a	Masotti (ITA); L 0–3 ^{PO}	Did not advance			8
Egzon Shala	−125 kg	Bye	Ercan (TUR); L 0–4 ^{ST}	Did not advance			9
