= Djamila Silva =

Cape Verdean judoka (born 1996)

Personal information
- Born: 13 August 1996 (age 29)
- Occupation: Judoka

Sport
- Country: Cape Verde
- Sport: Judo
- Weight class: ‍–‍52 kg

Achievements and titles
- Olympic Games: R32 (2024)
- World Champ.: R32 (2022, 2024)
- African Champ.: (silver) (2022, 2024)
Medal record
Women's judo
Representing Cape Verde
African Championships
| Silver medal – second place | 2022 Oran | ‍–‍52 kg |
| Silver medal – second place | 2024 Cairo | ‍–‍52 kg |
| Bronze medal – third place | 2021 Dakar | ‍–‍52 kg |
African Junior Championships
| Silver medal – second place | 2016 Casablanca | ‍–‍52 kg |

Profile at external databases
- IJF: 21831
- JudoInside.com: 95489
- Updated on 19 February 2026

Djamila Silva (born 13 August 1996) is a Portuguese-born Cape Verdean judoka. Silva represented Cape Verde at the 2024 Summer Olympics, where she qualified via continental ranking. At the opening ceremonies, she was one of Cape Verde's flagbearers alongside boxer Daniel Varela de Pina. In the women's 52kg judo event, she lost by ippon in her opening match against Brazilian Larissa Pimenta.
