= 2022 World Judo Championships – Women's 52 kg =

Judo competition

Judo Women's 52 kg at the 2022 World Judo Championships
- Venue: Humo Ice Dome
- Location: Tashkent, Uzbekistan
- Date: 7 October
- Competitors: 34 from 29 nations
- Total prize money: €57,000

Medalists
gold medal	Uta Abe (3rd title)	Japan
silver medal	Chelsie Giles	Great Britain
bronze medal	Distria Krasniqi	Kosovo
bronze medal	Amandine Buchard	France

Competition at external databases
- Links: IJF • JudoInside

The Women's 52 kg event at the 2022 World Judo Championships was held at the Humo Ice Dome arena in Tashkent, Uzbekistan on 7 October 2022.

== Results ==
=== Finals ===
Semi-finals
(France) Amandine Buchard	01
(Japan) Uta Abe	10
(Kosovo) Distria Krasniqi	00
(United Kingdom) Chelsie Giles	01

Final
(Japan) Uta Abe	01
(United Kingdom) Chelsie Giles	00

=== Repechage ===
Repechage
(Brazil) Larissa Pimenta	00
(Israel) Gefen Primo	10
(Mongolia) Bishreltiin Khorloodoi	11
(Poland) Aleksandra Kaleta	01

Bronze medal
(Israel) Gefen Primo	00
(Kosovo) Distria Krasniqi	10
(Mongolia) Bishreltiin Khorloodoi	00
(France) Amandine Buchard	01

=== Pool A ===
First round
(Switzerland) Binta Ndiaye	01
(Azerbaijan) Gultaj Mammadaliyeva	00

Round of 32
(France) Amandine Buchard	10
(Switzerland) Binta Ndiaye	00
(Italy) Martina Castagnola	00
(Spain) Estrella López Sheriff	10
(Uzbekistan) Diyora Keldiyorova	w/o
(Morocco) ~~Soumiya Iraoui~~	00
(Brazil) Larissa Pimenta	10
(Ivory Coast) Salimata Fofana	00

Round of 16
(France) Amandine Buchard	10
(Spain) Estrella López Sheriff	00
(Uzbekistan) Diyora Keldiyorova	00
(Brazil) Larissa Pimenta	01

Quarter-finals
(France) Amandine Buchard	01
(Brazil) Larissa Pimenta	00

=== Pool B ===
First round

Round of 32
(Israel) Gefen Primo	10
(Cuba) Melissa Hurtado	00
(Canada) Kelly Deguchi	00
(China) Liu Ben	10
(Japan) Uta Abe	10
(Serbia) Nadežda Petrović	00
(South Korea) Jung Ye-rin	01
(United States) Angelica Delgado	00

Round of 16
(Israel) Gefen Primo	01
(China) Liu Ben	00
(Japan) Uta Abe	10
(South Korea) Jung Ye-rin	00

Quarter-finals
(Israel) Gefen Primo	00
(Japan) Uta Abe	11

=== Pool C ===
First round
(Vietnam) Nguyễn Thủy	00
(Italy) Odette Giuffrida	10

Round of 32
(Hungary) Réka Pupp	00
(Mongolia) Bishreltiin Khorloodoi	10
(Portugal) Joana Diogo	10
(Uzbekistan) Sita Kadamboeva	00
(Kosovo) Distria Krasniqi	10
(Chinese Taipei) Hsu Lin-hsuan	00
(Algeria) Faïza Aissahine	00
(Italy) Odette Giuffrida	10

Round of 16
(Mongolia) Bishreltiin Khorloodoi	10
(Portugal) Joana Diogo	00
(Kosovo) Distria Krasniqi	10
(Italy) Odette Giuffrida	00

Quarter-finals
(Mongolia) Bishreltiin Khorloodoi	00
(Kosovo) Distria Krasniqi	01

=== Pool D ===
First round

Round of 32
(United Kingdom) Chelsie Giles	10
(China) Liu Liping	00
(Cape Verde) Djamila Silva	00
(United States) Katelyn Jarrell	10
(Switzerland) Fabienne Kocher	00
(Kazakhstan) Gaukhar Irmagambetova	10
(Germany) Mascha Ballhaus	00
(Poland) Aleksandra Kaleta	11

Round of 16
(United Kingdom) Chelsie Giles	10
(United States) Katelyn Jarrell	00
(Kazakhstan) Gaukhar Irmagambetova	00
(Poland) Aleksandra Kaleta	10

Quarter-finals
(United Kingdom) Chelsie Giles	10
(Poland) Aleksandra Kaleta	00
