= Jung Ye-rin =

Jung Ye-rin may refer to:

- Jung Ye-rin, known mononymously as Yerin (entertainer), South Korean singer and actress
- Jung Ye-rin (judoka), South Korean judoka
