= Chaimae Eddinari =

Moroccan judoka

Personal information
- Born: 19 July 1999 (age 26)
- Occupation: Judoka

Sport
- Country: Morocco
- Sport: Judo
- Weight class: ‍–‍48 kg, ‍–‍52 kg

Achievements and titles
- World Champ.: R323 (2018)
- African Champ.: (bronze) (2021, 2024)
Medal record
Women's judo
Representing Morocco
African Games
Gold medal – first place	2019 Rabat	‍–‍48 kg
African Championships
Bronze medal – third place	2021 Dakar	‍–‍48 kg
Bronze medal – third place	2024 Cairo	‍–‍52 kg
African Junior Championships
Gold medal – first place	2018 Bujumbura	‍–‍48 kg
Gold medal – first place	2019 Dakar	‍–‍48 kg

Profile at external databases
- IJF: 34240
- JudoInside.com: 108242
- Updated on 26 April 2024

Chaimae Eddinari is a Moroccan judoka. She is a gold medalist at the 2019 African Games and a bronze medalist at the 2021 African Judo Championships.

In 2018, she competed in the women's 48 kg event at the World Judo Championships held in Baku, Azerbaijan. She was eliminated in her first match.

She competed in the women's 48 kg event at the 2022 Mediterranean Games held in Oran, Algeria.

== Achievements ==
Year	Tournament	Place	Weight class
2019	African Games	1st	−48 kg
2021	African Championships	3rd	−48 kg
2024	African Championships	3rd	−52 kg
