= Judo at the 2022 Mediterranean Games – Men's +100 kg =

Judo competitions

Judo Men's +100 kg at the 2022 Mediterranean Games
- Venue: Mohammed Ben Ahmed Convention Centre – Hall 03 and 06
- Location: Oran, Algeria
- Date: 1 July
- Competitors: 12 from 12 nations

Medalists
gold medal	Vito Dragič	Slovenia
silver medal	Mohamed Sofiane Belrekaa	Algeria
bronze medal	Lorenzo Agro Sylvan	Italy
bronze medal	Wahib Hdiouech	Tunisia

The men's +100 kg competition in judo at the 2022 Mediterranean Games was held on 1 July at the Mohammed Ben Ahmed Convention Centre in Oran.

== Results ==
=== Main bracket ===
Round of 16
Irinel Chelaru (ESP)	01
Vasilije Vujičić (BIH)	00
Zouhair Esseryry (MAR)	10
Marvin Gadeau (MON)	00
Münir Ertuğ (TUR)	10
Marcel Škalec (CRO)	00
Lorenzo Agro Sylvan (ITA)	01
Panagiotis Papanikolaou (GRE)	00

Quarterfinals
Mohamed Sofiane Belrekaa (ALG)	10
Irinel Chelaru (ESP)	00
Guerman Andreev (FRA)	10
Zouhair Esseryry (MAR)	00
Vito Dragič (SLO)	10
Münir Ertuğ (TUR)	00
Wahib Hdiouech (TUN)	00
Lorenzo Agro Sylvan (ITA)	10

Semifinals
Mohamed Sofiane Belrekaa (ALG)	10
Guerman Andreev (FRA)	00
Vito Dragič (SLO)	10
Lorenzo Agro Sylvan (ITA)	00

Final
Mohamed Sofiane Belrekaa (ALG)	00
Vito Dragič (SLO)	01

=== Repechage ===
Repechage 2
Irinel Chelaru (ESP)	00
Zouhair Esseryry (MAR)	10

Bronze medal
Zouhair Esseryry (MAR)	00
Lorenzo Agro Sylvan (ITA)	10

Repechage 1
Panagiotis Papanikolaou (GRE)	00
Wahib Hdiouech (TUN)	10

Repechage 2
Münir Ertuğ (TUR)	00
Wahib Hdiouech (TUN)	10

Bronze medal
Wahib Hdiouech (TUN)	01
Guerman Andreev (FRA)	00
