= Nihel Bouchoucha =

Tunisian judoka (born 1995)

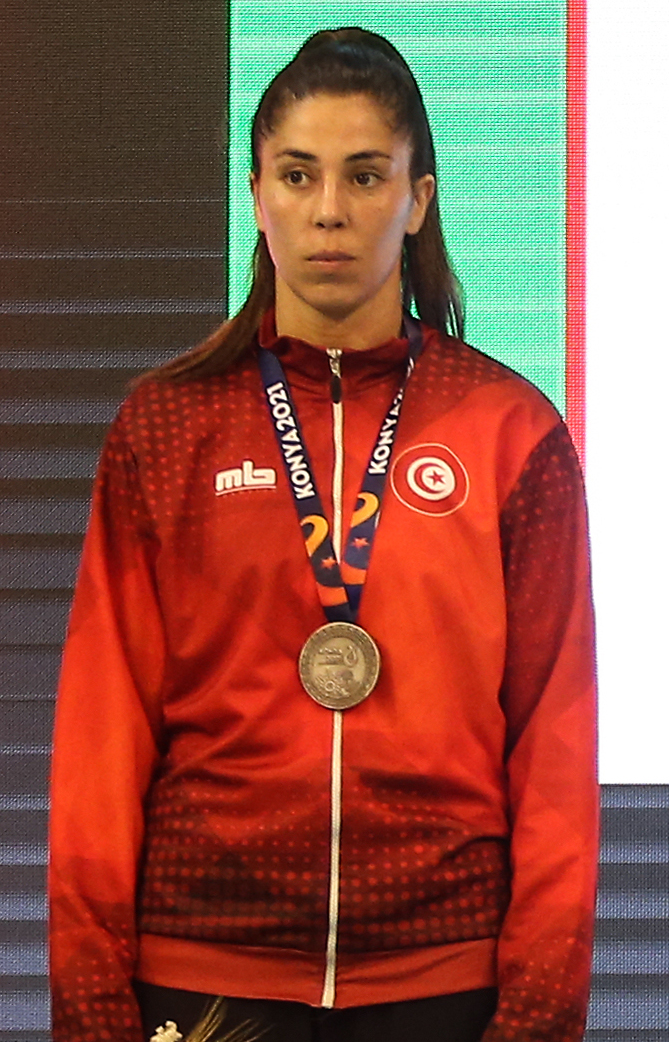
- Bouchoucha in 2022

Personal information
- Born: 1 July 1995 (age 31)
- Occupation: Judoka

Sport
- Country: Tunisia
- Sport: Judo
- Weight class: ‍–‍70 kg

Achievements and titles
- Olympic Games: R32 (2020)
- World Champ.: R16 (2021)
- African Champ.: (gold) (2019, 2021, 2022)
Medal record
Women's judo
Representing Tunisia
African Games
Silver medal – second place	2019 Rabat	‍–‍70 kg
Bronze medal – third place	2015 Brazzaville	‍–‍70 kg
Islamic Solidarity Games
Silver medal – second place	2021 Konya	‍–‍70 kg
African Championships
Gold medal – first place	2019 Cape Town	‍–‍70 kg
Gold medal – first place	2021 Dakar	‍–‍70 kg
Gold medal – first place	2022 Oran	‍–‍70 kg
Bronze medal – third place	2017 Antananarivo	‍–‍70 kg
Bronze medal – third place	2018 Tunis	‍–‍70 kg
Bronze medal – third place	2023 Casablanca	‍–‍70 kg
Mediterranean Games
Silver medal – second place	2022 Oran	‍–‍70 kg
African Junior Championships
Gold medal – first place	2012 Gaborone	‍–‍70 kg
Gold medal – first place	2013 Algiers	‍–‍70 kg
Silver medal – second place	2015 Sharm El Sheikh	‍–‍70 kg
Bronze medal – third place	2014 Tunis	‍–‍70 kg

Profile at external databases
- IJF: 11150
- JudoInside.com: 81226
- Updated on 9 September 2023

Nihel Bouchoucha (née Landolsi, born 1 July 1995) is a Tunisian judoka. She is a two-time medalist at the African Games. She is also a three-time gold medalist at the African Judo Championships.

== Career ==
She won one of the bronze medals in her event at the 2018 African Judo Championships held in Tunis, Tunisia. In 2019, she won the gold medal in the women's 70 kg event at the African Judo Championships held in Cape Town, South Africa. A few months later, she was eliminated in her first match in the women's 70 kg event at the 2019 World Judo Championships held in Tokyo, Japan.

At the 2021 African Judo Championships held in Dakar, Senegal, she won the gold medal in her event. She also competed in the women's 70 kg event at the 2021 World Judo Championships held in Budapest, Hungary. She was eliminated in her second match by Maria Portela of Brazil.

She competed in the women's 70 kg event at the 2020 Summer Olympics in Tokyo, Japan.

She won the silver medal in the women's 70 kg event at the 2022 Mediterranean Games held in Oran, Algeria. She also won the silver medal in her event at the 2021 Islamic Solidarity Games held in Konya, Turkey.

== Achievements ==
Year	Tournament	Place	Weight class
2015	African Games	3rd	−70 kg
2019	African Games	2nd	−70 kg
2023	Arab Games	1st	−70 kg
