= Jasmine Martin =

South African judoka (born 2000)

Personal information
- Born: 6 October 2000 (age 25) São Paulo, Brazil
- Occupation: Judoka

Sport
- Country: South Africa
- Sport: Judo
- Weight class: ‍–‍57 kg

Achievements and titles
- World Champ.: R32 (2022, 2024, 2025)
- African Champ.: (gold) (2025)
Medal record
Women's judo
Representing South Africa
African Games
Gold medal – first place	2023 Accra	‍–‍57 kg
African Championships
Gold medal – first place	2025 Abidjan	‍–‍63 kg
Silver medal – second place	2024 Cairo	‍–‍57 kg
Bronze medal – third place	2019 Cape Town	‍–‍63 kg
Bronze medal – third place	2022 Oran	‍–‍57 kg
Bronze medal – third place	2023 Casablanca	‍–‍57 kg
African Junior Championships
Silver medal – second place	2016 Casablanca	‍–‍57 kg

Profile at external databases
- IJF: 32932
- JudoInside.com: 55197
- Updated on 16 June 2025

Jasmine Martin (born 6 October 2000) is a Brazilian-born South African judoka.

== Personal life ==
Martin is engaged to Italian judoka and Paris 2024 Olympic champion Alice Bellandi.
