= 2021 African Judo Championships – Women's 70 kg =

Judo competition

Judo Women's 70 kg at the 2021 African Judo Championships
- Venue: Dakar Arena
- Location: Dakar, Senegal
- Date: 21 May 2021
- Competitors: 16 from 12 nations

Medalists
gold medal	Nihel Bouchoucha	Tunisia
silver medal	Mariem Khelifi	Tunisia
bronze medal	Fatou Kine Badji	Senegal
bronze medal	Souad Bellakehal	Algeria

Competition at external databases
- Links: IJF • JudoInside

The women's 70 kg competition in at the 2021 African Judo Championships was held on 21 May at the Dakar Arena in Dakar, Senegal.

== Results ==
=== Main Round ===
First round
Ayuk Otay Arrey Sophina (CMR)	00
Oulaya Khairi (MAR)	10
Souad Bellakehal (ALG)	10
Dianah Kana (KEN)	00
Carine Ngarlemdana (CHA)	11
Khadija Sonko (SEN)	00
Karene Agono Wora (GAB)	00
Mariem Khelifi (TUN)	10
Demos Memneloum (CHA)	01
Maria Niangi (ANG)	10
Fatou Kine Badji (SEN)	10
Ange Ciella Niragira (BDI)	00
Nihel Bouchoucha (TUN)	11
Philomene Dialli (GAB)	00
Anastasiya-Alexandra Nenova (RSA)	00
Aguirata Kabore (BUR)	10

Second round
Oulaya Khairi (MAR)	00
Souad Bellakehal (ALG)	11
Carine Ngarlemdana (CHA)	00
Mariem Khelifi (TUN)	10
Maria Niangi (ANG)	00
Fatou Kine Badji (SEN)	10
Nihel Bouchoucha (TUN)	11
Aguirata Kabore (BUR)	00

Semifinals
Souad Bellakehal (ALG)	00
Mariem Khelifi (TUN)	10
Fatou Kine Badji (SEN)	01
Nihel Bouchoucha (TUN)	11

Finals
Mariem Khelifi (TUN)	01
Nihel Bouchoucha (TUN)	11

=== Repechage ===
Repechage		Bronze medal
Oulaya Khairi (MAR)	11
Carine Ngarlemdana (CHA)	01	Oulaya Khairi (MAR)	00
		Fatou Kine Badji (SEN)	10

Repechage		Bronze medal
Maria Niangi (ANG)	01
Aguirata Kabore (BUR)	10	Aguirata Kabore (BUR)	00
		Souad Bellakehal (ALG)	11
