= Mohamed Abdelmawgoud =

Egyptian judoka (born 1994)

Personal information
- Born: 1 June 1994 (age 32)
- Occupation: Judoka

Sport
- Country: Egypt
- Sport: Judo
- Weight class: ‍–‍66 kg

Achievements and titles
- Olympic Games: R32 (2020)
- World Champ.: 7th (2019)
- African Champ.: (gold) (2014, 2018, 2019, 2020, 2023)
Medal record
Men's judo
Representing Egypt
African Games
Bronze medal – third place	2015 Brazzaville	‍–‍66 kg
Bronze medal – third place	2019 Rabat	‍–‍66 kg
African Championships
Gold medal – first place	2014 Port Louis	‍–‍66 kg
Gold medal – first place	2018 Tunis	‍–‍66 kg
Gold medal – first place	2019 Cape Town	‍–‍66 kg
Gold medal – first place	2020 Antananarivo	‍–‍66 kg
Gold medal – first place	2023 Casablanca	‍–‍66 kg
Silver medal – second place	2013 Maputo	‍–‍60 kg
Silver medal – second place	2016 Tunis	‍–‍66 kg
Bronze medal – third place	2024 Cairo	‍–‍66 kg
IJF Grand Prix
Silver medal – second place	2018 Budapest	‍–‍66 kg
Silver medal – second place	2019 Marrakesh	‍–‍66 kg
Bronze medal – third place	2019 Tashkent	‍–‍66 kg
African Junior Championships
Gold medal – first place	2011 Antananarivo	‍–‍60 kg
Gold medal – first place	2014 Tunis	‍–‍66 kg
Mediterranean Games
Gold medal – first place	2022 Oran	‍–‍66 kg

Profile at external databases
- IJF: 9786
- JudoInside.com: 78770
- Updated on 26 April 2024

Mohamed Abdelmawgoud (born 1 June 1994) is an Egyptian judoka. He competed in the men's 66 kg event at the 2020 Summer Olympics in Tokyo, Japan.

As per 9 September 2023, Abdelmawgoud is a 5 times gold medalist and 7 times medalist on the African Judo Championships in the ‍–‍66 kg class.
