= Charné Griesel =

South African judoka (born 2000)

Personal information
- Born: 20 July 2000 (age 25)
- Occupation: Judoka

Sport
- Country: South Africa
- Sport: Judo
- Weight class: ‍–‍52 kg
- Club: TuksJudo

Achievements and titles
- World Champ.: R32 (2021)
- African Champ.: (bronze) (2020, 2021, 2022, 2023)
- Commonwealth Games: (bronze) (2022)
Medal record
Women's judo
Representing South Africa
African Games
Bronze medal – third place	2023 Accra	‍–‍52 kg
African Championships
Bronze medal – third place	2020 Antananarivo	‍–‍52 kg
Bronze medal – third place	2021 Dakar	‍–‍52 kg
Bronze medal – third place	2022 Oran	‍–‍52 kg
Bronze medal – third place	2023 Casablanca	‍–‍52 kg
African Junior Championships
Bronze medal – third place	2018 Bujumbura	‍–‍57 kg
Bronze medal – third place	2019 Dakar	‍–‍52 kg
Commonwealth Games
Bronze medal – third place	2022 Birmingham	‍–‍52 kg

Profile at external databases
- IJF: 25943
- JudoInside.com: 98954
- Updated on 17 March 2024

Charne Griesel (born 20 July 2000) is a South African judoka. She won the bronze medal in Judo at the 2022 Commonwealth Games – Women's 52 kg.
