= 2021 African Judo Championships – Women's 52 kg =

Judo competition

Judo Women's 52 kg at the 2021 African Judo Championships
- Venue: Dakar Arena
- Location: Dakar, Senegal
- Date: 20 May 2021
- Competitors: 12 from 11 nations

Medalists
gold medal	Soumiya Iraoui	Morocco
silver medal	Salimata Fofana	Ivory Coast
bronze medal	Charne Griesel	South Africa
bronze medal	Djamila Silva	Cape Verde

Competition at external databases
- Links: IJF • JudoInside

The women's 52 kg competition in at the 2021 African Judo Championships was held on 20 May at the Dakar Arena in Dakar, Senegal.

== Results ==
=== Main Round ===
Round of 16
Christianne Legentil (MRI)	10
Marie Céline Baba Matia (CMR)	00
Meriem Moussa (ALG)	10
Leyla Sonko (SEN)	00
Mireille Andriamifehy (MAD)	00
Faïza Aissahine (ALG)	01
Jacira Ferreira (MOZ)	11
Imen Ben Younes (TUN)	00

Quarterfinals
Soumiya Iraoui (MAR)	11
Christianne Legentil (MRI)	00
Charne Griesel (RSA)	00
Meriem Moussa (ALG)	10
Salimata Fofana (CIV)	10
Faïza Aissahine (ALG)	00
Djamila Silva (CPV)	00
Jacira Ferreira (MOZ)	01

Semifinals
Soumiya Iraoui (MAR)	10
Meriem Moussa (ALG)	00
Salimata Fofana (CIV)	10
Jacira Ferreira (MOZ)	00

Final
Soumiya Iraoui (MAR)	10
Salimata Fofana (CIV)	00

=== Repechage ===
Repechage		Bronze medal
Christianne Legentil (MRI)	01
Charne Griesel (RSA)	11	Charne Griesel (RSA)	10
		Jacira Ferreira (MOZ)	00

Repechage		Bronze medal
Faïza Aissahine (ALG)	00
Djamila Silva (CPV)	10	Djamila Silva (CPV)	10
		Meriem Moussa (ALG)	00
