= Soumiya Iraoui =

Moroccan judoka (born 1996)

Personal information
- Born: 19 March 1996 (age 30)
- Occupation: Judoka

Sport
- Country: Morocco
- Sport: Judo
- Weight class: ‍–‍52 kg, ‍–‍57 kg

Achievements and titles
- Olympic Games: R16 (2020)
- World Champ.: R16 (2023, 2026)
- African Champ.: (gold) (2018, 2021, 2023, 2024, 2025, 2026)
Medal record
Women's judo
Representing Morocco
African Games
Silver medal – second place	2019 Rabat	‍–‍52 kg
African Championships
Gold medal – first place	2018 Tunis	‍–‍57 kg
Gold medal – first place	2021 Dakar	‍–‍52 kg
Gold medal – first place	2023 Casablanca	‍–‍52 kg
Gold medal – first place	2024 Cairo	‍–‍52 kg
Gold medal – first place	2025 Abidjan	‍–‍52 kg
Gold medal – first place	2026 Nairobi	‍–‍52 kg
Silver medal – second place	2019 Cape Town	‍–‍52 kg
Silver medal – second place	2020 Antananarivo	‍–‍52 kg
Bronze medal – third place	2022 Oran	‍–‍52 kg
IJF Grand Prix
Silver medal – second place	2023 Zagreb	‍–‍52 kg
Bronze medal – third place	2019 Tashkent	‍–‍52 kg
African Junior Championships
Gold medal – first place	2015 Sharm El Sheikh	‍–‍57 kg
Bronze medal – third place	2016 Casablanca	‍–‍57 kg
Mediterranean Games
Silver medal – second place	2026 Taranto	‍–‍52 kg
Islamic Solidarity Games
Silver medal – second place	2021 Konya	‍–‍52 kg
Jeux de la Francophonie
Bronze medal – third place	2017 Abidjan	‍–‍57 kg

Profile at external databases
- IJF: 13042
- JudoInside.com: 38550
- Updated on 5 October 2026

Soumiya Iraoui (born 19 March 1996) is a Moroccan judoka. Iraoui is a silver medalist from the 2019 African Games and a nine-time medalist, including six gold medals, at the African Judo Championships. Iraoui also represented Morocco at the 2020 Summer Olympics in Tokyo, Japan.

== Career ==
Iraoui won the gold medal in her event at the 2018 African Judo Championships held in Tunis, Tunisia. She also competed in the women's 57 kg event at the 2018 Mediterranean Games held in Tarragona, Catalonia, Spain.

In 2019, Iraoui won the silver medal in the women's 52 kg event at the African Judo Championships held in Cape Town, South Africa. She also won the silver medal in the women's 52 kg event at the 2019 African Games in Rabat, Morocco. That same month, she also competed in the women's 52 kg event at the 2019 World Judo Championships in Tokyo, Japan. A month later, she won a bronze medal in her event at the 2019 Judo Grand Prix Tashkent held in Tashkent, Uzbekistan.

Iraoui won the silver medal in this event at the 2020 African Judo Championships held in Antananarivo, Madagascar. In 2021, she competed in the women's 52 kg event at the Judo World Masters held in Doha, Qatar where she was eliminated in her first match by Réka Pupp of Hungary. At the 2021 African Judo Championships held in Dakar, Senegal, she won the gold medal in her event.

In 2021, Iraoui represented Morocco at the 2020 Summer Olympics in Tokyo, Japan. She competed in the women's 52 kg event. She won her first match against Kachakorn Warasiha of Thailand and she was then eliminated by Chelsie Giles of Great Britain. Giles went on to win one of the bronze medals in the event. A few months later, she lost her bronze medal match in her event at the Judo Grand Slam Abu Dhabi held in Abu Dhabi, United Arab Emirates.

Iraoui lost her bronze medal match in the women's 52 kg event at the 2022 Mediterranean Games held in Oran, Algeria.

== Achievements ==
Year	Tournament	Place	Weight class
2018	African Championships	1st	−57 kg
2019	African Championships	2nd	−52 kg
2019	African Games	2nd	−52 kg
2020	African Championships	2nd	−52 kg
2021	African Championships	1st	−52 kg
2022	African Championships	3rd	−52 kg
2023	African Championships	1st	−52 kg
2024	African Championships	1st	−52 kg
2025	African Championships	1st	−52 kg
2026	African Championships	1st	−52 kg
