= 2021 African Judo Championships – Women's 48 kg =

Judo competition

Judo Women's 48 kg at the 2021 African Judo Championships
- Venue: Dakar Arena
- Location: Dakar, Senegal
- Date: 20 May 2021
- Competitors: 12 from 9 nations

Medalists
gold medal	Oumaima Bedioui	Tunisia
silver medal	Priscilla Morand	Mauritius
bronze medal	Rania Harbaoui	Tunisia
bronze medal	Chaimae Eddinari	Morocco

Competition at external databases
- Links: IJF • JudoInside

The women's 48 kg competition in at the 2021 African Judo Championships was held on 20 May 2021 at the Dakar Arena in Dakar, Senegal.

== Results ==
=== Main Round ===
Round of 16
Oumaima Bedioui (TUN)	10
Harriet Boniface (MWI)	00
Chaimae Eddinari (MAR)	10
Aicha Dado Diop (SEN)	00
Jennie Muneme (MOZ)	00
Marie Jeanne Seck (SEN)	10
Rania Harbaoui (TUN)	11
Maïmouna Diarrassouba (CIV)	00

Quarterfinals
Aziza Chakir (MAR)	00
Oumaima Bedioui (TUN)	11
Signoline Kanyamuneza (BDI)	00
Chaimae Eddinari (MAR)	11
Priscilla Morand (MRI)	11
Marie Jeanne Seck (SEN)	00
Hadjer Mecerem (ALG)	00
Rania Harbaoui (TUN)	10

Semifinals
Oumaima Bedioui (TUN)	11
Chaimae Eddinari (MAR)	00
Priscilla Morand (MRI)	10
Rania Harbaoui (TUN)	00

Final
Oumaima Bedioui (TUN)	01
Priscilla Morand (MRI)	00

=== Repechage ===
Repechage		Bronze medal
		Aziza Chakir (MAR)	00
Aziza Chakir (MAR)	10	Rania Harbaoui (TUN)	10
Signoline Kanyamuneza (BDI)	00

Repechage		Bronze medal
		Hadjer Mecerem (ALG)	00
Marie Jeanne Seck (SEN)	00	Chaimae Eddinari (MAR)	01
Hadjer Mecerem (ALG)	10
