= Mohamed Sofiane Belrekaa =

Algerian judoka (born 1991)

Personal information
- Born: 21 March 1991 (age 35)
- Occupation: Judoka

Sport
- Country: Algeria
- Sport: Judo
- Weight class: +100 kg, Open

Achievements and titles
- World Champ.: R32 (2023)
- African Champ.: (gold) (2018, 2022)
Medal record
Men's judo
Representing Algeria
African Games
Silver medal – second place	2019 Rabat	+100 kg
African Championships
Gold medal – first place	2018 Tunis	Open
Gold medal – first place	2022 Oran	+100 kg
Silver medal – second place	2019 Cape Town	+100 kg
Silver medal – second place	2020 Antananarivo	+100 kg
Silver medal – second place	2021 Dakar	+100 kg
Bronze medal – third place	2016 Tunis	Open
Mediterranean Games
Silver medal – second place	2022 Oran	+100 kg
African Junior Championships
Bronze medal – third place	2010 Dakar	+100 kg

Profile at external databases
- IJF: 1254
- JudoInside.com: 57110
- Updated on 14 May 2023

Mohamed Sofiane Belrekaa (born 21 March 1991) is an Algerian judoka. He represented Algeria at the 2019 African Games held in Rabat, Morocco and he won the silver medal in the men's +100 kg event.

At the 2021 African Judo Championships held in Dakar, Senegal, Belrekaa won the silver medal in his event.

Belrekaa won the silver medal in the men's +100 kg event at the 2022 Mediterranean Games held in Oran, Algeria.
