= 2022 African Judo Championships =

Judo competition

2022 Judo African Judo Championships
- Venue: Convention Centre Mohammed Ben Ahmed
- Location: Oran, Algeria
- Dates: 26–29 May 2022
- Competitors: 173 from 26 nations

Champions
- Mixed team: Algeria

Competition at external databases
- Links: IJF • JudoInside

The 2022 African Judo Championships (Arabic: بطولة إفريقيا للجودو 2022) was the 43rd edition of the African Judo Championships and were held at the Convention Centre Mohammed Ben Ahmed in Oran, Algeria from 26 to 29 May 2022, with the mixed team event taking place on the championships' last day.

== Event videos ==
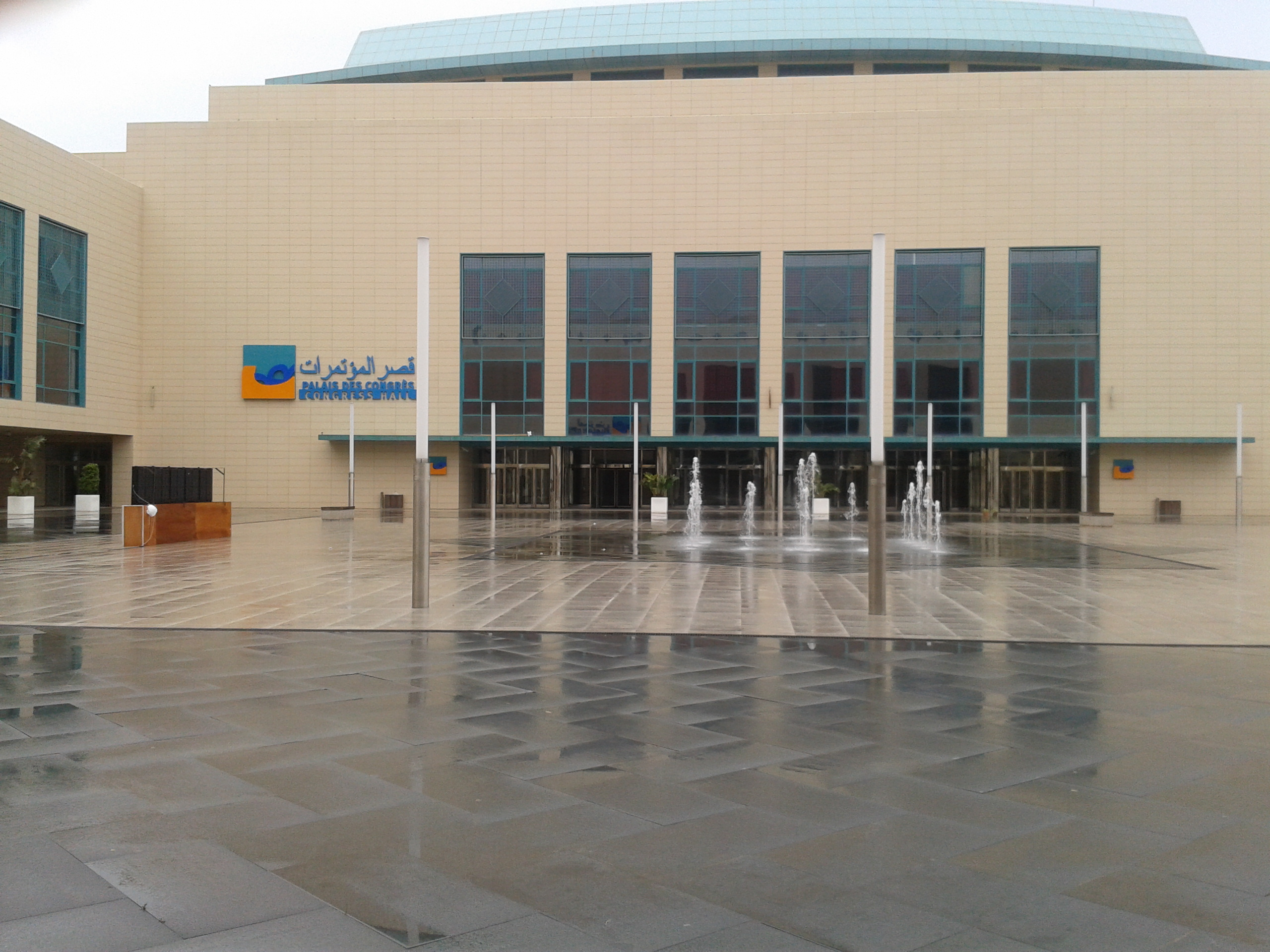
Convention Centre Mohammed Ben Ahmed, Oran.

The event airs on the African Judo Union's YouTube channel.

	Weight classes	Preliminaries		Final Block
Day 1	Men: -60, -66 Women: -48, -52, -57	Tatami 1	Tatami 2	Final Block
Day 2	Men: -73, -81 Women: -63, -70	Tatami 1	Tatami 2	Final Block
Day 3	Men: -90, -100, +100 Women: -78, +78	Tatami 1	Tatami 2	Final Block
Day 4	Mixed team	Tatami 1	Tatami 2	Final Block

== Medal summary ==
=== Individuals events ===
==== Men's events ====
Event	Gold	Silver	Bronze
Extra-lightweight (−60 kg)	Youssry Samy (EGY)	Fraj Dhouibi (TUN)	Younes Saddiki (MAR)
Extra-lightweight (−60 kg)	Youssry Samy (EGY)	Fraj Dhouibi (TUN)	Billel Yagoubi (ALG)
Half-lightweight (−66 kg)	Edmilson Pedro (ANG)	Abderrahmane Boushita (MAR)	Imad Bassou (MAR)
Half-lightweight (−66 kg)	Edmilson Pedro (ANG)	Abderrahmane Boushita (MAR)	Steven Mungandu (ZAM)
Lightweight (−73 kg)	Messaoud Dris (ALG)	Houd Zourdani (ALG)	Hassan Doukkali (MAR)
Lightweight (−73 kg)	Messaoud Dris (ALG)	Houd Zourdani (ALG)	Aleddine Ben Chalbi (TUN)
Half-middleweight (−81 kg)	Achraf Moutii (MAR)	Wajdi Hajji (TUN)	Abdelrahman Abdelghany (EGY)
Half-middleweight (−81 kg)	Achraf Moutii (MAR)	Wajdi Hajji (TUN)	Aghiles Imad Benazoug (ALG)
Middleweight (−90 kg)	Abderrahmane Benamadi (ALG)	Thomas-Laszlo Breytenbach (RSA)	Rémi Feuillet (MRI)
Middleweight (−90 kg)	Abderrahmane Benamadi (ALG)	Thomas-Laszlo Breytenbach (RSA)	Ali Hazem (EGY)
Half-heavyweight (−100 kg)	Koussay Ben Ghares (TUN)	Mustapha Bouamar (ALG)	Koffi Krémé Kobena (CIV)
Half-heavyweight (−100 kg)	Koussay Ben Ghares (TUN)	Mustapha Bouamar (ALG)	Seidou Nji Mouluh (CMR)
Heavyweight (+100 kg)	Mohamed Sofiane Belrekaa (ALG)	Wahib Hdiouech (TUN)	Mohamed Aborakia (EGY)
Heavyweight (+100 kg)	Mohamed Sofiane Belrekaa (ALG)	Wahib Hdiouech (TUN)	Mbagnick Ndiaye (SEN)

==== Women's events ====
Event	Gold	Silver	Bronze
Extra-lightweight (−48 kg)	Priscilla Morand (MRI)	Oumaima Bedioui (TUN)	Geronay Whitebooi (RSA)
Extra-lightweight (−48 kg)	Priscilla Morand (MRI)	Oumaima Bedioui (TUN)	Imane Rezzoug (ALG)
Half-lightweight (−52 kg)	Faiza Aissahine (ALG)	Djamila Silva (CPV)	Charne Griesel (RSA)
Half-lightweight (−52 kg)	Faiza Aissahine (ALG)	Djamila Silva (CPV)	Soumiya Iraoui (MAR)
Lightweight (−57 kg)	Yamina Halata (ALG)	Christianne Legentil (MRI)	Zouleiha Abzetta Dabonne (CIV)
Lightweight (−57 kg)	Yamina Halata (ALG)	Christianne Legentil (MRI)	Jasmine Martin (RSA)
Half-middleweight (−63 kg)	Amina Belkadi (ALG)	Sarah Harachi (MAR)	Audrey Jeannette Etoua Biock (CMR)
Half-middleweight (−63 kg)	Amina Belkadi (ALG)	Sarah Harachi (MAR)	Meriem Bjaoui (TUN)
Middleweight (−70 kg)	Nihel Bouchoucha (TUN)	Souad Bellakehal (ALG)	Zita Ornella Biami (CMR)
Middleweight (−70 kg)	Nihel Bouchoucha (TUN)	Souad Bellakehal (ALG)	Maria Niangi (ANG)
Half-heavyweight (−78 kg)	Kaouthar Ouallal (ALG)	Ayuk Otay Arrey Sophina (CMR)	Georgika Wesly Djengue Moune (CMR)
Half-heavyweight (−78 kg)	Kaouthar Ouallal (ALG)	Ayuk Otay Arrey Sophina (CMR)	Hafsa Yatim (MAR)
Heavyweight (+78 kg)	Sarra Mzougui (TUN)	Monica Sagna (SEN)	Meroua Mammeri (ALG)
Heavyweight (+78 kg)	Sarra Mzougui (TUN)	Monica Sagna (SEN)	Sonia Asselah (ALG)

=== Mixed team event ===
Event	Gold	Silver	Bronze
Mixed team	Algeria (ALG)	Senegal (SEN)	Cameroon (CMR)
Mixed team	Algeria (ALG)	Senegal (SEN)	Morocco (MAR)

=== Medal table ===
* Host nation (Algeria)

Rank	Nation	Gold	Silver	Bronze	Total
1	Algeria (ALG)*	8	3	5	16
2	Tunisia (TUN)	3	4	2	9
3	Morocco (MAR)	1	2	6	9
4	Mauritius (MRI)	1	1	1	3
5	Egypt (EGY)	1	0	3	4
6	Angola (ANG)	1	0	1	2
7	Senegal (SEN)	0	2	1	3
8	Cameroon (CMR)	0	1	5	6
9	South Africa (RSA)	0	1	3	4
10	Cape Verde (CPV)	0	1	0	1
11	Ivory Coast (CIV)	0	0	2	2
12	Zambia (ZAM)	0	0	1	1
Totals (12 entries)		15	15	30	60

== Kata ==
.

Event	Gold	Silver	Bronze
Nage No Kata	Algeria (Merouane Bouguettaya - Nacer Bouguettaya)	Algeria (Mohamed Akil - Rabie Kohli)	South Africa (Erasmus Reece-Hunter - Moagi junior Molefe)
Kime No Kata	Algeria (Rachid Messaâdia - Karim Touati)	Algeria (Hacene Zemouri - Halim Zaabat)	South Africa (Erasmus Reece-Hunter - Moagi junior Molefe)
Katame No Kata	Algeria (Lahcenet Bennaceur - Brahim Belloti)	Algeria (Djamel Benmerzoug - Mossab Meziani)	Algeria (Ammar Khelloufi - Khaled Meslem)
Goshin Jutsu	Algeria (Brahim Belloti - Mohamed Akil)	Algeria (Khaled Meksem - Amar Khaloufi)	Algeria (Habi Belkadi - Mohamed Medjehed)
Ju No Kata	Algeria (Samia Allegue - Hamza Tebani)	Algeria (Messaouda Belhadj - Fares Haddadi)	-
