= 2019 Judo Grand Prix Tashkent =

Judo competition

Judo 2019 Judo Grand Prix Tashkent
- Venue: Humo Arena, Tashkent
- Location: Tashkent, Uzbekistan
- Dates: 20–22 September 2019
- Competitors: 418 from 69 nations

Competition at external databases
- Links: IJF • EJU • JudoInside

The 2019 Judo Grand Prix Tashkent was held in Tashkent, Uzbekistan, from 20 to 22 September 2019.

== Medal summary ==
=== Men's events ===
Event	Gold	Silver	Bronze
Extra-lightweight (−60 kg)	Yago Abuladze (RUS)	Genki Koga (JPN)	Yang Yung-wei (TPE)
Extra-lightweight (−60 kg)	Yago Abuladze (RUS)	Genki Koga (JPN)	Diyorbek Urozboev (UZB)
Half-lightweight (−66 kg)	Yakub Shamilov (RUS)	Yuji Aida (JPN)	Mohamed Abdelmawgoud (EGY)
Half-lightweight (−66 kg)	Yakub Shamilov (RUS)	Yuji Aida (JPN)	Sardor Nurillaev (UZB)
Lightweight (−73 kg)	Khikmatillokh Turaev (UZB)	Behruzi Khojazoda (TJK)	Bilal Çiloğlu (TUR)
Lightweight (−73 kg)	Khikmatillokh Turaev (UZB)	Behruzi Khojazoda (TJK)	Magdiel Estrada (CUB)
Half-middleweight (−81 kg)	Sharofiddin Boltaboev (UZB)	Kamoliddin Rasulov (UZB)	Shamil Borchashvili (AUT)
Half-middleweight (−81 kg)	Sharofiddin Boltaboev (UZB)	Kamoliddin Rasulov (UZB)	Sami Chouchi (BEL)
Middleweight (−90 kg)	Marcus Nyman (SWE)	Khusen Khalmurzaev (RUS)	Mashu Baker (JPN)
Middleweight (−90 kg)	Marcus Nyman (SWE)	Khusen Khalmurzaev (RUS)	Peter Žilka (SVK)
Half-heavyweight (−100 kg)	Kazbek Zankishiev (RUS)	Zelym Kotsoiev (AZE)	Daniel Mukete (BLR)
Half-heavyweight (−100 kg)	Kazbek Zankishiev (RUS)	Zelym Kotsoiev (AZE)	Mikita Sviryd (BLR)
Heavyweight (+100 kg)	Guram Tushishvili (GEO)	Bekmurod Oltiboev (UZB)	Stephan Hegyi (AUT)
Heavyweight (+100 kg)	Guram Tushishvili (GEO)	Bekmurod Oltiboev (UZB)	Iakiv Khammo (UKR)

=== Women's events ===
Event	Gold	Silver	Bronze
Extra-lightweight (−48 kg)	Sabina Giliazova (RUS)	Leyla Aliyeva (AZE)	Mélodie Vaugarny (FRA)
Extra-lightweight (−48 kg)	Sabina Giliazova (RUS)	Leyla Aliyeva (AZE)	Maryna Cherniak (UKR)
Half-lightweight (−52 kg)	Jeong Bo-kyeong (KOR)	Bishreltiin Khorloodoi (MGL)	Gefen Primo (ISR)
Half-lightweight (−52 kg)	Jeong Bo-kyeong (KOR)	Bishreltiin Khorloodoi (MGL)	Soumiya Iraoui (MAR)
Lightweight (−57 kg)	Hedvig Karakas (HUN)	Ivelina Ilieva (BUL)	Kim Jan-di (KOR)
Lightweight (−57 kg)	Hedvig Karakas (HUN)	Ivelina Ilieva (BUL)	Kwon You-jeong (KOR)
Half-middleweight (−63 kg)	Kathrin Unterwurzacher (AUT)	Anriquelis Barrios (VEN)	Lucy Renshall (GBR)
Half-middleweight (−63 kg)	Kathrin Unterwurzacher (AUT)	Anriquelis Barrios (VEN)	Inbal Shemesh (ISR)
Middleweight (−70 kg)	Elisavet Teltsidou (GRE)	Gulnoza Matniyazova (UZB)	Elvismar Rodríguez (VEN)
Middleweight (−70 kg)	Elisavet Teltsidou (GRE)	Gulnoza Matniyazova (UZB)	Hilde Jager (NED)
Half-heavyweight (−78 kg)	Bernadette Graf (AUT)	Antonina Shmeleva (RUS)	Natalie Powell (GBR)
Half-heavyweight (−78 kg)	Bernadette Graf (AUT)	Antonina Shmeleva (RUS)	Karla Prodan (CRO)
Heavyweight (+78 kg)	Ksenia Chibisova (RUS)	Kim Ha-yun (KOR)	Sarah Adlington (GBR)
Heavyweight (+78 kg)	Ksenia Chibisova (RUS)	Kim Ha-yun (KOR)	Milica Žabić (SRB)

Source Results

=== Medal table ===
* Host nation (Uzbekistan)

Rank	Nation	Gold	Silver	Bronze	Total
1	Russia (RUS)	5	2	0	7
2	Uzbekistan (UZB)*	2	3	2	7
3	Austria (AUT)	2	0	2	4
4	South Korea (KOR)	1	1	2	4
5	Georgia (GEO)	1	0	0	1
5	Greece (GRE)	1	0	0	1
5	Hungary (HUN)	1	0	0	1
5	Sweden (SWE)	1	0	0	1
9	Japan (JPN)	0	2	1	3
10	Azerbaijan (AZE)	0	2	0	2
11	Venezuela (VEN)	0	1	1	2
12	Bulgaria (BUL)	0	1	0	1
12	Mongolia (MGL)	0	1	0	1
12	Tajikistan (TJK)	0	1	0	1
15	Great Britain (GBR)	0	0	3	3
16	Belarus (BLR)	0	0	2	2
16	Israel (ISR)	0	0	2	2
16	Ukraine (UKR)	0	0	2	2
19	Belgium (BEL)	0	0	1	1
19	Chinese Taipei (TPE)	0	0	1	1
19	Croatia (CRO)	0	0	1	1
19	Cuba (CUB)	0	0	1	1
19	Egypt (EGY)	0	0	1	1
19	France (FRA)	0	0	1	1
19	Morocco (MAR)	0	0	1	1
19	Netherlands (NED)	0	0	1	1
19	Serbia (SRB)	0	0	1	1
19	Slovakia (SVK)	0	0	1	1
19	Turkey (TUR)	0	0	1	1
Totals (29 entries)		14	14	28	56
