= Messaoud Dris =

Algerian judoka (born 2001)

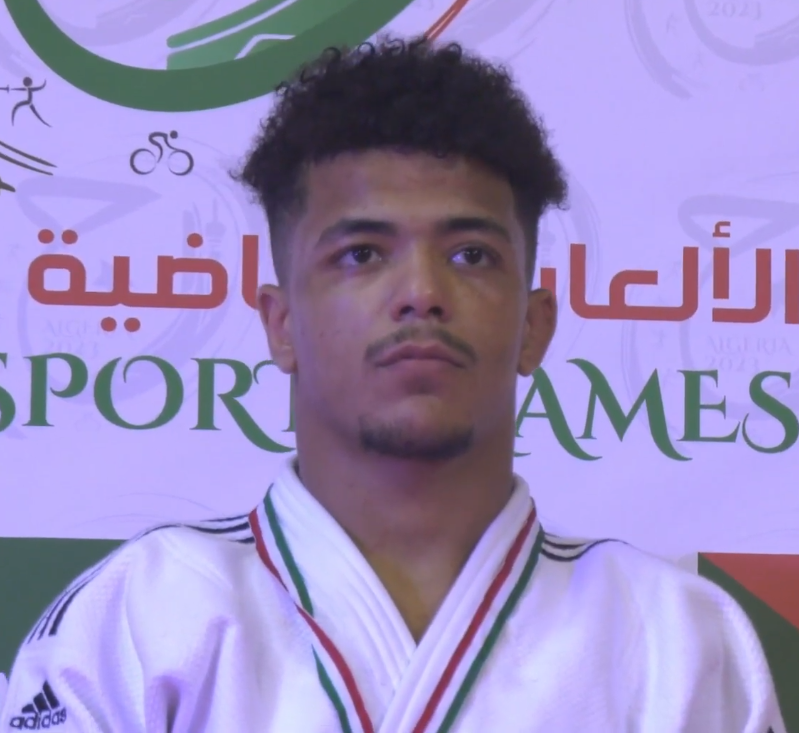
- Dris in 2023

Personal information
- Full name: Messaoud Redouane Dris
- Born: 13 September 2001 (age 24) Oran, Algeria
- Home town: Oran (Algeria) and Paris (France)
- Occupation: Judoka

Sport
- Country: Algeria
- Sport: Judo
- Weight class: ‍–‍73 kg
- Team: All-Algeria National Team

Achievements and titles
- World Champ.: 7th (2023)
- African Champ.: (gold) (2022, 2023, 2024, 2026)
Medal record
Men's judo
Representing Algeria
African Championships
Gold medal – first place	2022 Oran	‍–‍73 kg
Gold medal – first place	2023 Casablanca	‍–‍73 kg
Gold medal – first place	2024 Cairo	‍–‍73 kg
Gold medal – first place	2026 Nairobi	‍–‍73 kg
Bronze medal – third place	2025 Abidjan	‍–‍73 kg
IJF Grand Prix
Silver medal – second place	2023 Zagreb	‍–‍73 kg
African Junior Championships
Gold medal – first place	2019 Dakar	‍–‍66 kg
Mediterranean Games
Gold medal – first place	2022 Oran	‍–‍73 kg
Gold medal – first place	2026 Taranto	‍–‍73 kg
Arab Games
Gold medal – first place	2023 Algiers	‍–‍73 kg
African Military Games
Gold medal – first place	2024 Abuja	‍–‍73 kg

Profile at external databases
- IJF: 39086
- JudoInside.com: 114100
- Updated on 1 September 2026

Messaoud Redouane Dris (Arabic: مسعود رضوان دريس; born 13 September 2001) is an Algerian judoka. He was ranked fourteenth in the lightweight division in May 2024.

== Career ==
Dris started his career with CS Ouled El-Bahia in Oran, Algeria. In January 2023, he joined Paris Saint-Germain.

Dris became the African Champion in 2022 and won a gold medal at the 2022 Mediterranean Games. He took part in World Judo Championships on 2022 and 2023.

He was disqualified from the 2024 Paris Olympics judo competition after failing the weigh-in on the day before he was scheduled to face Israeli judoka Tohar Butbul. The International Judo Federation (IJF) said in July 2024 that after the Olympic Games concluded it would investigate the reason that he failed to meet his weight, and that "further action will be taken if needed."
