= Oumaima Bedioui =

Tunisian judoka (born 1998)

Personal information
- Born: 27 January 1998 (age 28)
- Occupation: Judoka

Sport
- Country: Tunisia
- Sport: Judo
- Weight class: ‍–‍48 kg

Achievements and titles
- Olympic Games: R16 (2024)
- World Champ.: R16 (2025)
- African Champ.: (gold) (2021, 2023, 2024, 2025)
Medal record
Women's judo
Representing Tunisia
African Games
Gold medal – first place	2023 Accra	‍–‍48 kg
African Championships
Gold medal – first place	2021 Dakar	‍–‍48 kg
Gold medal – first place	2023 Casablanca	‍–‍48 kg
Gold medal – first place	2024 Cairo	‍–‍48 kg
Gold medal – first place	2025 Abidjan	‍–‍48 kg
Silver medal – second place	2022 Oran	‍–‍48 kg
Bronze medal – third place	2019 Cape Town	‍–‍48 kg
Bronze medal – third place	2026 Nairobi	‍–‍48 kg
World Juniors Championships
Silver medal – second place	2018 Nassau	‍–‍44 kg
African Junior Championships
Gold medal – first place	2016 Casablanca	‍–‍44 kg
Gold medal – first place	2018 Bujumbura	‍–‍44 kg
World Cadets Championships
Bronze medal – third place	2015 Sarajevo	‍–‍40 kg
Mediterranean Games
Silver medal – second place	2026 Taranto	‍–‍48 kg
Bronze medal – third place	2022 Oran	‍–‍48 kg
Islamic Solidarity Games
Bronze medal – third place	2021 Konya	‍–‍48 kg

Profile at external databases
- IJF: 12892
- JudoInside.com: 99418
- Updated on 1 September 2026

Oumaima Bedioui (born 27 January 1998) is a judoka who competes internationally for Tunisia.

== Achievement ==
Bedioui won a bronze medal at the World Cadet Championships in Sarajevo in 2015. She was number 1 of the IJF World Ranking for cadets U40kg in 2014. Bedioui won a silver medal at the Junior World Championships in Nassau, Bahamas in the 2018 World Championship Juniors. She won a bronze medal at the African Championships in Cape Town in 2019.

She won one of the bronze medals in the women's 48 kg event at the 2022 Mediterranean Games held in Oran, Algeria.
