= Judo at the 2020 Summer Olympics – Women's 52 kg =

Judo competition

Women's 52 kg at the Games of the XXXII Olympiad
- Venue: Nippon Budokan
- Date: 25 July 2021
- Competitors: 29 from 29 nations

Medalists
1st place, gold medalist(s)		Uta Abe	Japan
2nd place, silver medalist(s)		Amandine Buchard	France
3rd place, bronze medalist(s)		Odette Giuffrida	Italy
3rd place, bronze medalist(s)		Chelsie Giles	Great Britain

The women's 52 kg competition in judo at the 2020 Summer Olympics in Tokyo was held on 25 July 2021 at the Nippon Budokan.

== Results ==
=== Finals ===
Semi-finals
1 Amandine Buchard (FRA)	10
Fabienne Kocher (SUI)	00
2 Uta Abe (JPN)	01
3 Odette Giuffrida (ITA)	00

Gold medal
1 Amandine Buchard (FRA)	00
2 Uta Abe (JPN)	10

=== Repechage ===
Repechage
Park Da-sol (KOR)	00
Réka Pupp (HUN)	01

Bronze medal
3 Odette Giuffrida (ITA)	10
Réka Pupp (HUN)	00

Repechage
7 Chelsie Giles (GBR)	10
6 Charline van Snick (BEL)	00

Bronze medal
Fabienne Kocher (SUI)	00
7 Chelsie Giles (GBR)	10

=== Pool A ===
Round of 32
Tetiana Levytska-Shukvani (GEO)	10
Sabiana Anestor (HAI)	00
8 Natalia Kuziutina (ROC)	10
Kristine Jiménez (PAN)	00
Taciana Cesar (GBS)	00
Park Da-sol (KOR)	11

Round of 16
1 Amandine Buchard (FRA)	11
Tetiana Levytska-Shukvani (GEO)	00
8 Natalia Kuziutina (ROC)	00
Park Da-sol (KOR)	01

Quarter-finals
1 Amandine Buchard (FRA)	10
Park Da-sol (KOR)	00

=== Pool B ===
Round of 32
4 Majlinda Kelmendi (KOS)	00
Réka Pupp (HUN)	01
Joana Ramos (POR)	00
Angelica Delgado (USA)	10
5 Ana Perez Box (ESP)	00
Fabienne Kocher (SUI)	01
Diyora Keldiyorova (UZB)	00
Sosorbaram Lkhagvasuren (MGL)	10

Round of 16
Réka Pupp (HUN)	10
Angelica Delgado (USA)	00
Fabienne Kocher (SUI)	01
Sosorbaram Lkhagvasuren (MGL)	00

Quarter-finals
Réka Pupp (HUN)	00
Fabienne Kocher (SUI)	10

=== Pool C ===
Round of 32
Larissa Pimenta (BRA)	01
Agatha Perenc (POL)	00
7 Chelsie Giles (GBR)	11
Arbresha Rexhepi (MKD)	00
Soumiya Iraoui (MAR)	10
Kachakorn Warasiha (THA)	00

Round of 16
2 Uta Abe (JPN)	10
Larissa Pimenta (BRA)	00
7 Chelsie Giles (GBR)	10
Soumiya Iraoui (MAR)	00

Quarter-finals
2 Uta Abe (JPN)	01
7 Chelsie Giles (GBR)	00

=== Pool D ===
Round of 32
Nguyễn Thủy (VIE)	00
Andreea Chitu (ROU)	10
6 Charline van Snick (BEL)	11
Ecaterina Guica (CAN)	00
Gulbadam Babamuratova (TKM)	00
Gili Cohen (ISR)	10

Round of 16
3 Odette Giuffrida (ITA)	10
Andreea Chitu (ROU)	00
6 Charline van Snick (BEL)	10
Gili Cohen (ISR)	00

Quarter-finals
3 Odette Giuffrida (ITA)	01
6 Charline van Snick (BEL)	00
