= Lamiaa Alzenan =

Egyptian judoka (born 1991)

Personal information
- Nationality: Egyptian
- Born: 23 February 1991 (age 35)

Sport
- Country: Egypt
- Sport: Judo
- Weight class: 57 kg
Medal record
Women's judo
Representing Egypt
African Games
Bronze medal – third place	2019 Rabat	−57 kg
African Judo Championships
Silver medal – second place	2018 Tunis	−57 kg
Silver medal – second place	2019 Cape Town	−57 kg

Lamiaa Alzenan (born 23 February 1991) is an Egyptian judoka. She is a bronze medalist at the African Games and a two-time medalist at the African Judo Championships.

In 2019, she won the silver medal in the women's 57 kg event at the African Judo Championships held in Cape Town, South Africa. She also won the silver medal in her event in 2018.

== Achievements ==
Lamiaa Alzenan has won multiple medals in continental judo competitions representing Egypt. She secured a bronze medal in the women's 57 kg event at the 2019 African Games. She also won silver medals at the African Judo Championships in 2018 and 2019, competing in the −57 kg weight category. In addition, she has participated in International Judo Federation (IJF) events, including competitions on the IJF World Tour.

Year	Tournament	Place	Weight class
2018	2018 Judo Grand Prix Budapest	Participation	-57 kg
2019	African Games	3rd	−57 kg
