= Maryam March Maharani =

Indonesian Olympic judoka

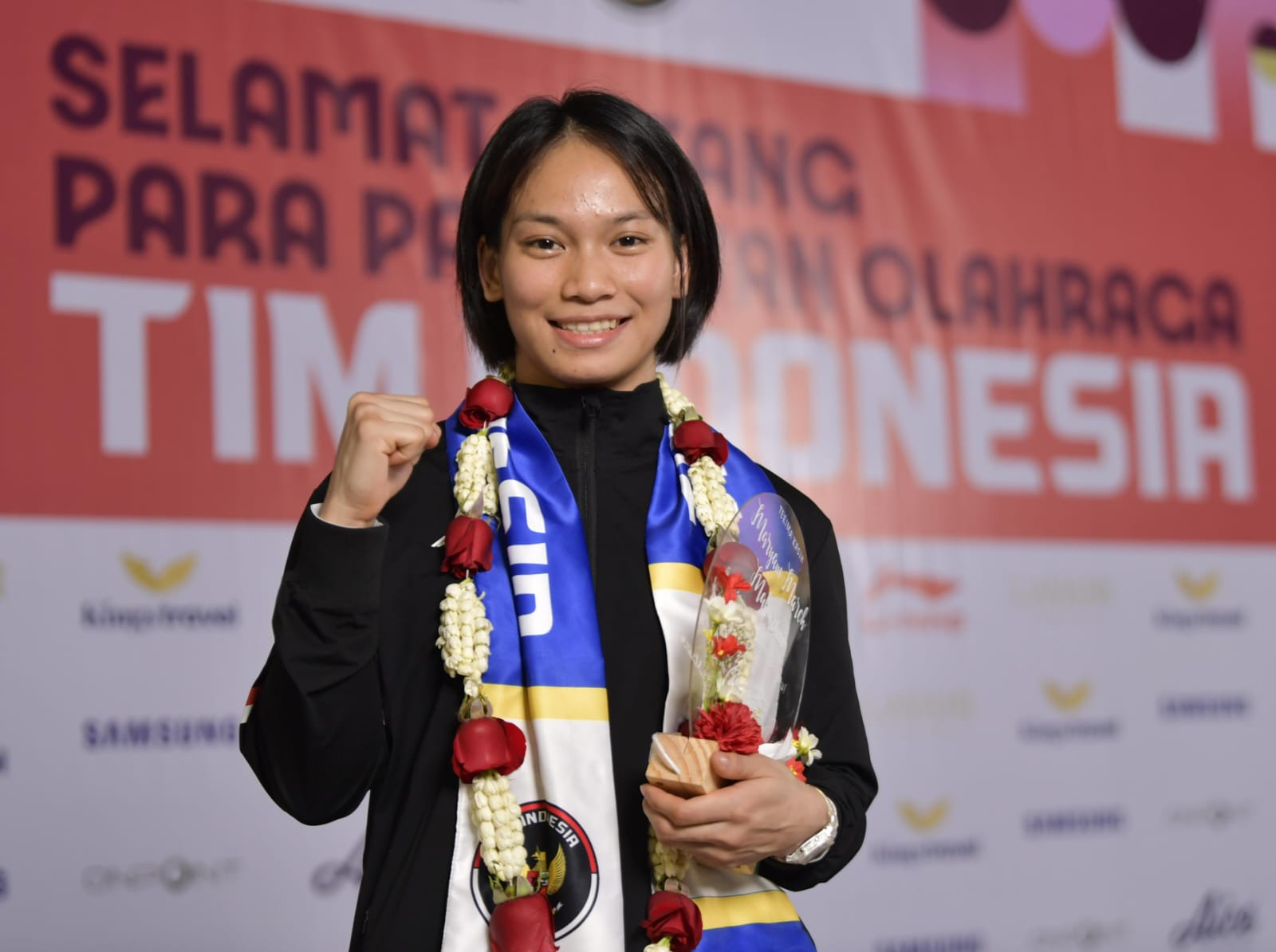

Personal information
- Born: 8 March 2000 (age 26) Jakarta, Indonesia
- Education: State University of Jakarta
- Occupation: Judoka

Sport
- Country: Indonesia
- Sport: Judo
- Weight class: 52 kg
- Coached by: Putu Wiradamungga

Achievements and titles
- Olympic Games: R16 (2024)
- World Champ.: R32 (2025)
- Asian Champ.: 5th (2023)
Medal record
Women's judo
Representing Indonesia
SEA Games
Bronze medal – third place	2023 Cambodia	Mixed team
ASEAN University Games
Silver medal – second place	2024 Surabaya–Malang	52 kg

Profile at external databases
- IJF: 49319
- JudoInside.com: 131146
- Updated on 28 July 2024

Maryam March Maharani (born 8 March 2000) is an Indonesian judoka. She competed in the women's 52 kg event at the 2024 Summer Olympics and became flagbearer at the opening ceremony.

Maharani secured her spots for women's under 52 kg categories, after being ranked sixth out of ten eligible judoka through the Asian women's continental quota allocation, in the IJF final Olympics ranking.

Maharani ended a 12-year wait for Indonesia to send another judo athlete to the Olympics. Maharani became the first judo athlete to represent Indonesia at the Olympics since Putu Wiradamungga at the 2012 Olympics.

Maharani finished in the top 16 position after being defeated by 2020 Olympic gold medalist, Distria Krasniqi, who later won silver in this event.

== Achievements ==
Year	Competition	Venue	Rank	Event	Ref
2023	Hong Kong Asian Open	Hong Kong	2nd	52 kg	
2024	Warsaw European Open	Warsaw, Poland	3rd	52 kg	
2024	ASEAN University Games	Surabaya, Indonesia	2nd	52 kg	

Olympic Games
Preceded by Rio Waida	Flagbearer for Indonesia; Paris 2024	Succeeded by Incumbent
