= Mbagnick Ndiaye =

Senegalese judoka (born 1993)

Personal information
- Nationality: Senegalese
- Born: 5 November 1993 (age 32)
- Occupation: Judoka

Sport
- Country: Senegal
- Sport: Judo
- Weight class: ‍–‍100 kg, +100 kg

Achievements and titles
- Olympic Games: R16 (2020, 2024)
- World Champ.: R32 (2015, 2019, 2021, 2022, 2023, 2025)
- African Champ.: (gold) (2019, 2020, 2023)
Medal record
Men's judo
Representing Senegal
African Games
Gold medal – first place	2019 Rabat	+100 kg
Silver medal – second place	2023 Accra	+100 kg
African Championships
Gold medal – first place	2019 Cape Town	+100 kg
Gold medal – first place	2020 Antananarivo	+100 kg
Gold medal – first place	2023 Casablanca	+100 kg
Silver medal – second place	2017 Antananarivo	Open
Silver medal – second place	2018 Tunis	+100 kg
Silver medal – second place	2025 Abidjan	+100 kg
Bronze medal – third place	2014 Port Louis	‍–‍100 kg
Bronze medal – third place	2017 Antananarivo	+100 kg
Bronze medal – third place	2021 Dakar	+100 kg
Bronze medal – third place	2022 Oran	+100 kg
Bronze medal – third place	2024 Cairo	+100 kg
IJF Grand Prix
Bronze medal – third place	2022 Almada	+100 kg
Islamic Solidarity Games
Bronze medal – third place	2021 Konya	+100 kg
Jeux de la Francophonie
Silver medal – second place	2017 Abidjan	+100 kg

Profile at external databases
- IJF: 10710
- JudoInside.com: 86431
- Updated on 19 June 2025

Mbagnick Ndiaye (born 5 November 1993) is a Senegalese judoka. He represented Senegal at the 2019 African Games held in Rabat, Morocco, where he won the gold medal in the men's +100 kg event. In the same year, he also won the gold medal in the men's +100 kg event at the 2019 African Judo Championships held in Cape Town, South Africa.

== Career ==
He has won several medals at the African Judo Championships.

In 2021, he competed in the men's +100 kg event at the Judo World Masters held in Doha, Qatar. At the 2021 African Judo Championships held in Dakar, Senegal, he won one of the bronze medals in his event. He also competed in the men's +100 kg event at the 2020 Summer Olympics held in Tokyo, Japan.

In 2022, he won one of the bronze medals in his event at the 2022 Judo Grand Prix Almada held in Almada, Portugal.

== Achievements ==
Year	Tournament	Place	Weight class
2014	African Championships	3rd	100 kg
2017	African Championships	3rd	+100 kg
2018	African Championships	2nd	+100 kg
2019	African Championships	1st	+100 kg
2019	African Games	1st	+100 kg
2020	African Championships	1st	+100 kg
2021	African Championships	3rd	+100 kg
2022	African Championships	3rd	+100 kg
2023	African Championships	1st	+100 kg
2024	African Championships	3rd	+100 kg
2024	African Games	2nd	+100 kg
2025	African Championships	2nd	+100 kg

Olympic Games
Preceded by Isabelle Sambou	Flag bearer for Senegal; Tokyo 2020 with Jeanne Boutbien	Succeeded by Louis François Mendy; Combe Seck
