= 2019 Judo Grand Slam Paris =

Judo competition

Judo 2019 Judo Grand Slam Paris
- Venue: AccorHotels Arena of Bercy, Paris
- Location: Paris, France
- Dates: 9–10 February 2019
- Competitors: 570 from 97 nations

Competition at external databases
- Links: IJF • EJU • JudoInside

The 2019 Judo Grand Slam Paris was held in Paris, France, from 9 to 10 February 2019.

== Medal summary ==
=== Men's events ===
Event	Gold	Silver	Bronze
Extra-lightweight (−60 kg)	Naohisa Takato (JPN)	Yeldos Smetov (KAZ)	Dashdavaagiin Amartüvshin (MGL)
Extra-lightweight (−60 kg)	Naohisa Takato (JPN)	Yeldos Smetov (KAZ)	Temur Nozadze (GEO)
Half-lightweight (−66 kg)	Denis Vieru (MDA)	Vazha Margvelashvili (GEO)	Baruch Shmailov (ISR)
Half-lightweight (−66 kg)	Denis Vieru (MDA)	Vazha Margvelashvili (GEO)	Georgii Zantaraia (UKR)
Lightweight (−73 kg)	Soichi Hashimoto (JPN)	Tsend-Ochiryn Tsogtbaatar (MGL)	Lasha Shavdatuashvili (GEO)
Lightweight (−73 kg)	Soichi Hashimoto (JPN)	Tsend-Ochiryn Tsogtbaatar (MGL)	Fabio Basile (ITA)
Half-middleweight (−81 kg)	Dominic Ressel (GER)	Sagi Muki (ISR)	Saeid Mollaei (IRI)
Half-middleweight (−81 kg)	Dominic Ressel (GER)	Sagi Muki (ISR)	Alan Khubetsov (RUS)
Middleweight (−90 kg)	Gwak Dong-han (KOR)	Islam Bozbayev (KAZ)	Krisztián Tóth (HUN)
Middleweight (−90 kg)	Gwak Dong-han (KOR)	Islam Bozbayev (KAZ)	Kenta Nagasawa (JPN)
Half-heavyweight (−100 kg)	Varlam Liparteliani (GEO)	Aaron Wolf (JPN)	Peter Paltchik (ISR)
Half-heavyweight (−100 kg)	Varlam Liparteliani (GEO)	Aaron Wolf (JPN)	Cho Gu-ham (KOR)
Heavyweight (+100 kg)	Kim Sung-min (KOR)	Hisayoshi Harasawa (JPN)	Kokoro Kageura (JPN)
Heavyweight (+100 kg)	Kim Sung-min (KOR)	Hisayoshi Harasawa (JPN)	Ushangi Kokauri (AZE)

=== Women's events ===
Event	Gold	Silver	Bronze
Extra-lightweight (−48 kg)	Ami Kondo (JPN)	Distria Krasniqi (KOS)	Otgontsetseg Galbadrakh (KAZ)
Extra-lightweight (−48 kg)	Ami Kondo (JPN)	Distria Krasniqi (KOS)	Mélodie Vaugarny (FRA)
Half-lightweight (−52 kg)	Ai Shishime (JPN)	Natsumi Tsunoda (JPN)	Astride Gneto (FRA)
Half-lightweight (−52 kg)	Ai Shishime (JPN)	Natsumi Tsunoda (JPN)	Odette Giuffrida (ITA)
Lightweight (−57 kg)	Christa Deguchi (CAN)	Jessica Klimkait (CAN)	Momo Tamaoki (JPN)
Lightweight (−57 kg)	Christa Deguchi (CAN)	Jessica Klimkait (CAN)	Kim Ji-su (KOR)
Half-middleweight (−63 kg)	Clarisse Agbegnenou (FRA)	Tina Trstenjak (SLO)	Nami Nabekura (JPN)
Half-middleweight (−63 kg)	Clarisse Agbegnenou (FRA)	Tina Trstenjak (SLO)	Andreja Leški (SLO)
Middleweight (−70 kg)	Yoko Ono (JPN)	Margaux Pinot (FRA)	Saki Niizoe (JPN)
Middleweight (−70 kg)	Yoko Ono (JPN)	Margaux Pinot (FRA)	Bárbara Timo (POR)
Half-heavyweight (−78 kg)	Madeleine Malonga (FRA)	Luise Malzahn (GER)	Mami Umeki (JPN)
Half-heavyweight (−78 kg)	Madeleine Malonga (FRA)	Luise Malzahn (GER)	Chen Fei (CHN)
Heavyweight (+78 kg)	Idalys Ortiz (CUB)	Iryna Kindzerska (AZE)	Akira Sone (JPN)
Heavyweight (+78 kg)	Idalys Ortiz (CUB)	Iryna Kindzerska (AZE)	Kim Min-jeong (KOR)

Source Results

=== Medal table ===
* Host nation (France)

Rank	Nation	Gold	Silver	Bronze	Total
1	Japan (JPN)	5	3	7	15
2	France (FRA)*	2	1	2	5
3	South Korea (KOR)	2	0	3	5
4	Georgia (GEO)	1	1	2	4
5	Canada (CAN)	1	1	0	2
5	Germany (GER)	1	1	0	2
7	Cuba (CUB)	1	0	0	1
7	Moldova (MDA)	1	0	0	1
9	Kazakhstan (KAZ)	0	2	1	3
10	Israel (ISR)	0	1	2	3
11	Azerbaijan (AZE)	0	1	1	2
11	Mongolia (MGL)	0	1	1	2
11	Slovenia (SLO)	0	1	1	2
14	Kosovo (KOS)	0	1	0	1
15	Italy (ITA)	0	0	2	2
16	China (CHN)	0	0	1	1
16	Hungary (HUN)	0	0	1	1
16	Iran (IRI)	0	0	1	1
16	Portugal (POR)	0	0	1	1
16	Russia (RUS)	0	0	1	1
16	Ukraine (UKR)	0	0	1	1
Totals (21 entries)		14	14	28	56
