= 2024 African Judo Championships =

Judo competition

2024 Judo African Judo Championships
- Venue: Cairo Stadium Indoor Halls Complex
- Location: Cairo, Egypt
- Dates: 25–28 April 2024
- Competitors: 190 from 34 nations

Competition at external databases
- Links: IJF • JudoInside

The 2024 African Judo Championships are the 45th edition of the African Judo Championships and was held in Hall 1 of the Cairo Stadium Indoor Halls Complex in Cairo, Egypt from 25 to 28 April 2024 as part of the IJF World Tour and during the 2024 Summer Olympics qualification period. The last day of competition featured a mixed team event.

== Medal summary ==
=== Men's events ===
Event	Gold	Silver	Bronze
Extra-lightweight (−60 kg)	Younes Saddiki (MAR)	Youssry Samy (EGY)	Simon Zulu (ZAM)
Extra-lightweight (−60 kg)	Younes Saddiki (MAR)	Youssry Samy (EGY)	Leonardo Barros (ANG)
Half-lightweight (−66 kg)	Kais Moudetere (ALG)	Ahmed Abdelrahman (EGY)	Mohamed Abdelmawgoud (EGY)
Half-lightweight (−66 kg)	Kais Moudetere (ALG)	Ahmed Abdelrahman (EGY)	Edmilson Pedro (ANG)
Lightweight (−73 kg)	Messaoud Dris (ALG)	Alaeddine Ben Chalbi (TUN)	Faye Njie (GAM)
Lightweight (−73 kg)	Messaoud Dris (ALG)	Alaeddine Ben Chalbi (TUN)	Rodrigo Fernando (ANG)
Half-middleweight (−81 kg)	Abdelrahman Mohamed (EGY)	Ahmed El Meziati (MAR)	Saliou Ndiaye (SEN)
Half-middleweight (−81 kg)	Abdelrahman Mohamed (EGY)	Ahmed El Meziati (MAR)	Santos Sebastião (ANG)
Middleweight (−90 kg)	Ali Hazem (EGY)	Rémi Feuillet (MRI)	Lokmane Daroul (ALG)
Middleweight (−90 kg)	Ali Hazem (EGY)	Rémi Feuillet (MRI)	Yassine Kouraichi (TUN)
Half-heavyweight (−100 kg)	Koussay Ben Ghares (TUN)	Franck Ulrick Tahman Zan (CMR)	Mustapha Bouamar (ALG)
Half-heavyweight (−100 kg)	Koussay Ben Ghares (TUN)	Franck Ulrick Tahman Zan (CMR)	Karim Ibrahim (EGY)
Heavyweight (+100 kg)	Mohamed Aborakia (EGY)	Mohamed El Mehdi Lili (ALG)	Wahib Hdiouech (TUN)
Heavyweight (+100 kg)	Mohamed Aborakia (EGY)	Mohamed El Mehdi Lili (ALG)	Mbagnick Ndiaye (SEN)

Source results:

=== Women's events ===
Event	Gold	Silver	Bronze
Extra-lightweight (−48 kg)	Oumaima Bedioui (TUN)	Houaria Kaddour (ALG)	Aziza Chakir (MAR)
Extra-lightweight (−48 kg)	Oumaima Bedioui (TUN)	Houaria Kaddour (ALG)	Virginia Aymard (GAB)
Half-lightweight (−52 kg)	Soumiya Iraoui (MAR)	Djamila Silva (CPV)	Faïza Aissahine (ALG)
Half-lightweight (−52 kg)	Soumiya Iraoui (MAR)	Djamila Silva (CPV)	Chaimae Eddinari (MAR)
Lightweight (−57 kg)	Mariana Esteves (GUI)	Jasmine Martin (RSA)	Zouleiha Dabonne (CIV)
Lightweight (−57 kg)	Mariana Esteves (GUI)	Jasmine Martin (RSA)	Andreza Antonio (ANG)
Half-middleweight (−63 kg)	Amina Belkadi (ALG)	Nadia Matchiko Guimendego (CAF)	Sandrine Billiet (CPV)
Half-middleweight (−63 kg)	Amina Belkadi (ALG)	Nadia Matchiko Guimendego (CAF)	Chaimae Taibi (MAR)
Middleweight (−70 kg)	Maria Niangi (ANG)	Assmaa Niang (MAR)	Sofia Belattar (MAR)
Middleweight (−70 kg)	Maria Niangi (ANG)	Assmaa Niang (MAR)	Aina Laura Rasoanaivo Razafy (MAD)
Half-heavyweight (−78 kg)	Marie Branser (GUI)	Georgika Wesly Djengue Moune (CMR)	Hafsa Yatim (MAR)
Half-heavyweight (−78 kg)	Marie Branser (GUI)	Georgika Wesly Djengue Moune (CMR)	Aya Gaballa (EGY)
Heavyweight (+78 kg)	Richelle Anita Soppi Mbella (CMR)	Georgette Sagna (SEN)	Zeineb Troudi (TUN)
Heavyweight (+78 kg)	Richelle Anita Soppi Mbella (CMR)	Georgette Sagna (SEN)	Sarra Mzougui (TUN)

Source results:

=== Mixed events ===
Event	Gold	Silver	Bronze
Mixed team	Egypt	Tunisia	Algeria
Mixed team	Egypt	Tunisia	Angola

Source results:

=== Medal table ===
* Host nation (Egypt)

Rank	Nation	Gold	Silver	Bronze	Total
1	Egypt (EGY)*	3	2	4	9
2	Algeria (ALG)	3	2	3	8
3	Morocco (MAR)	2	2	5	9
4	Tunisia (TUN)	2	1	4	7
5	Guinea (GUI)	2	0	0	2
6	Cameroon (CMR)	1	2	0	3
7	Angola (ANG)	1	0	5	6
8	Senegal (SEN)	0	1	2	3
9	Cape Verde (CPV)	0	1	1	2
10	Central African Republic (CAF)	0	1	0	1
10	Mauritius (MRI)	0	1	0	1
10	South Africa (RSA)	0	1	0	1
13	Gabon (GAB)	0	0	1	1
13	Gambia (GAM)	0	0	1	1
13	Ivory Coast (CIV)	0	0	1	1
13	Madagascar (MAD)	0	0	1	1
13	Zambia (ZAM)	0	0	1	1
Totals (17 entries)		14	14	29	57
