= Eyale Le Beau =

Congolese judoka (1989-)

Personal information
- Born: January 29, 1989 (age 37)
- Occupation: Judoka

Sport
- Country: DR Congo
- Sport: Judo
Medal record
Representing Democratic Republic of the Congo
Men's judo
African Championships
Bronze medal – third place	2018 Tunis	-90 kg

Profile at external databases
- IJF: 36251
- JudoInside.com: 105861

Eyale Le Beau (born 29 January 1989) is a Democratic Republic of the Congo judoka. He represented the DRC at the 2018 African Judo Championships, where he won a bronze medal in the men's -90 kg category. In the 2019 African Judo Championships he came in 5th place. He had also taken part in the 2017, 2018, and 2019 World Judo Championships, not winning a medal.

== Achievements ==
Year	Tournament	Place	Weight class
2019	African Judo Championships	5th	Middleweight (90 kg)
2018	African Judo Championships	3rd	Middleweight (90 kg)
