= Mélodie Vaugarny =

French judoka (born 1993)

Personal information
- Born: 26 July 1993 (age 32)
- Occupation: Judoka

Sport
- Country: France
- Sport: Judo
- Weight class: ‍–‍48 kg
Medal record
Women's judo
Representing France
IJF Grand Slam
Bronze medal – third place	2019 Paris	‍–‍48 kg
IJF Grand Prix
Bronze medal – third place	2019 Tashkent	‍–‍48 kg

Profile at external databases
- IJF: 18952
- JudoInside.com: 74910
- Updated on 26 November 2022

Mélodie Vaugarny (born 26 July 1993) is a French judoka.

Vaugarny is a bronze medalist from the 2019 Judo Grand Slam Paris in the ‍–‍48 kg category.
