= Judo at the 2022 Asian Games – Women's 52 kg =

Judo competition

Judo Women's 52 kg at the 2022 Asian Games
- Venue: Xiaoshan Linpu Gymnasium
- Location: Hangzhou, China
- Dates: 24 September 2023
- Nations: 15

Medalists
gold medal	Diyora Keldiyorova; Uzbekistan
silver medal	Bishreltiin Khorloodoi; United Arab Emirates
bronze medal	Lkhagvasürengiin Sosorbaram; Mongolia
bronze medal	Jung Ye-rin; South Korea

Competition at external databases
- Links: IJF • JudoInside

The women's 52 kilograms (half lightweight) competition in Judo at the 2022 Asian Games in Hangzhou was held on 24 September 2023 at the Xiaoshan Linpu Gymnasium.

== Schedule ==
All times are China Standard Time (UTC+08:00)

Date	Time	Event
Sunday, 24 September 2023	10:00	Elimination round of 16
Sunday, 24 September 2023	10:00	Quarterfinals
Sunday, 24 September 2023	10:00	Repechage
Sunday, 24 September 2023	10:00	Semifinals
Sunday, 24 September 2023	16:00	Finals

== Results ==
=== Main bracket ===
Round of 16
Saýara Rozyýewa (TKM)	01
Akhliya Muminova (TJK)	10 (yellow card)
Lkhagvasürengiin Sosorbaram (MGL)	10
Debaki Maya Shrestha (NEP)	00
Zhu Yeqing (CHN)	00
Galiya Tynbayeva (KAZ)	01
Bishreltiin Khorloodoi (UAE)	10
Kim Won-gum (PRK)	00
Maryam March Maharani (INA)	10
Kanyawee Prasertsri (THA)	00
Ai Shishime (JPN)	10
Lin Hsu-wan-chu (TPE)	00
Jung Ye-rin (KOR)	w/o
Tsui Shuk-ki (HKG)

Quarter-finals
Diyora Keldiyorova (UZB)	10
Akhliya Muminova (TJK)	00
Lkhagvasürengiin Sosorbaram (MGL)	01
Galiya Tynbayeva (KAZ)	00
Bishreltiin Khorloodoi (UAE)	10 (yellow card)
Maryam March Maharani (INA)	00 (yellow card)
Ai Shishime (JPN)	00
Jung Ye-rin (KOR)	10

Semi-finals
Diyora Keldiyorova (UZB)	01
Lkhagvasürengiin Sosorbaram (MGL)	00 (yellow card)
Bishreltiin Khorloodoi (UAE)	01 (yellow card)
Jung Ye-rin (KOR)	00 (yellow card)

Gold medal contest
Diyora Keldiyorova (UZB)	10
Bishreltiin Khorloodoi (UAE)	00

=== Repechage ===
Repechage
Akhliya Muminova (TJK)	00
Galiya Tynbayeva (KAZ)	10
Maryam March Maharani (INA)	w/o
Ai Shishime (JPN)

Bronze medal contests
Galiya Tynbayeva (KAZ)	00
Jung Ye-rin (KOR)	01
Maryam March Maharani (INA)	00
Lkhagvasürengiin Sosorbaram (MGL)	10
