= Judo at the 2023 Pan American Games – Women's 52 kg =

Judo Women's 52 kg at the 2023 Pan American Games
- Venue: Contact Sports Center
- Location: Santiago, Chile
- Date: 28 October
- Competitors: 11 from 11 nations
- Website: Official website

Medalists
gold medal	Larissa Pimenta (2nd title)	Brazil
silver medal	Paulina Martínez	Mexico
bronze medal	Angelica Delgado	United States
bronze medal	Lilian Cordones	Panama

Competition at external databases
- Links: IJF

The women's 52 kg competition of the judo events at the 2023 Pan American Games was held on 28 October 2023 at the Contact Sports Center (Centro de Entrenamiento de los Deportes de Contacto) in Santiago, Chile. A total of 11 athletes from 11 NOC's competed.

== Schedule ==
All times are local (UTC−3)

Date	Time	Event
Saturday, 28 October 2023	10:00	Elimination round of 16
Saturday, 28 October 2023	10:00	Quarterfinals
Saturday, 28 October 2023	11:00	Repechage
Saturday, 28 October 2023	11:00	Semifinals
Saturday, 28 October 2023	15:00	Finals

== Results ==
=== Main Bracket ===
Round of 16
Francine Echevarría (PUR)	10
Jennifer Etienne (HAI)	00 (yellow card)
Lilian Cordones (PAN)	01 (yellow card)
Brillith Gamarra (PER)	00 (yellow card)
Judith González (CHI)	10
Aracelly Barrionuevo (ECU)	00 (yellow card)

Quarter-finals
Paulina Martínez (MEX)	10
Francine Echevarría (PUR)	00
Fabiola Díaz (VEN)	00
Lilian Cordones (PAN)	10
Larissa Pimenta (BRA)	10 (yellow card)
Judith González (CHI)	00
Agustina Lahiton (ARG)	00 (yellow card)
Angelica Delgado (USA)	10

Semi-finals
Paulina Martínez (MEX)	01 (yellow card)
Lilian Cordones (PAN)	00 (yellow card)
Larissa Pimenta (BRA)	10 (yellow card)
Angelica Delgado (USA)	00

Gold medal contest
Paulina Martínez (MEX)	00
Larissa Pimenta (BRA)	10

=== Repechage ===
Repechage
Francine Echevarría (PUR)	01 (yellow card)
Fabiola Díaz (VEN)	00 (yellow card)
Judith González (CHI)	11
Agustina Lahiton (ARG)	00 (yellow card)

Bronze medal contests
Francine Echevarría (PUR)	00
Angelica Delgado (USA)	10
Judith González (CHI)	00 (yellow card)
Lilian Cordones (PAN)	01
