= 2022 European Judo Championships – Women's 52 kg =

Judo Women's 52 kg at the 2022 European Judo Championships
- Venue: Armeets Arena
- Location: Sofia, Bulgaria
- Date: 29 April
- Competitors: 20 from 16 nations

Medalists
gold medal	Chelsie Giles (1st title)	Great Britain
silver medal	Amandine Buchard	France
bronze medal	Distria Krasniqi	Kosovo
bronze medal	Ana Viktorija Puljiz	Croatia

Competition at external databases
- Links: IJF • JudoInside

The women's 52 kg competition at the 2022 European Judo Championships was held on 29 April at the Armeets Arena.

== Results ==
=== Finals ===
Semi-finals
Amandine Buchard (FRA)	01
Gefen Primo (ISR)	00
Mascha Ballhaus (GER)	00
Chelsie Giles (GBR)	10

Final
Amandine Buchard (FRA)	00
Chelsie Giles (GBR)	01

=== Repechage ===
Repechage
Distria Krasniqi (KOS)	01
Fabienne Kocher (SUI)	00
Ana Viktorija Puljiz (CRO)	01
Odette Giuffrida (ITA)	00

Bronze medal
Distria Krasniqi (KOS)	10
Mascha Ballhaus (GER)	00
Ana Viktorija Puljiz (CRO)	10
Gefen Primo (ISR)	00

=== Pool A ===
First round
Martina Castagnola (ITA)	00
Joana Diogo (POR)	10

Round of 16
Amandine Buchard (FRA)	01
Joana Diogo (POR)	00
Distria Krasniqi (KOS)	10
Gabriela Dimitrova (BUL)	00

Quarterfinals
Amandine Buchard (FRA)	10
Distria Krasniqi (KOS)	00

=== Pool B ===
First round
Annika Würfel (GER)	10
Sofia Asvesta (CYP)	00

Round of 16
Fabienne Kocher (SUI)	w/o
~~Izaskun Ballesteros Gonzalez~~ (ESP)
Gefen Primo (ISR)	10
Annika Würfel (GER)	00

Quarterfinals
Fabienne Kocher (SUI)	00
Gefen Primo (ISR)	10

=== Pool C ===
First round
Mascha Ballhaus (GER)	01
Binta Ndiaye (SUI)	00

Round of 16
Réka Pupp (HUN)	00
Mascha Ballhaus (GER)	01
Ana Perez Box (ESP)	00
Ana Viktorija Puljiz (CRO)	10

Quarterfinals
Mascha Ballhaus (GER)	11
Ana Viktorija Puljiz (CRO)	01

=== Pool D ===
First round
Nadežda Petrović (SRB)	10
Cleonia Riciu (ROU)	00

Round of 16
Chelsie Giles (GBR)	10
Aleksandra Kaleta (POL)	00
Odette Giuffrida (ITA)	10
Nadežda Petrović (SRB)	00

Quarterfinals
Chelsie Giles (GBR)	01
Odette Giuffrida (ITA)	00
