= Amina Belkadi =

Algerian judoka (born 1992)

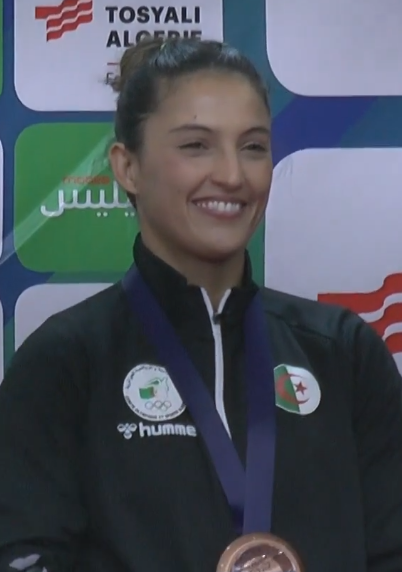
- Belkadi in 2022

Personal information
- Born: 10 November 1992 (age 33) Remchi, Algeria
- Occupation: Judoka

Sport
- Country: Algeria
- Sport: Judo
- Weight class: ‍–‍63 kg

Achievements and titles
- Olympic Games: R16 (2024)
- World Champ.: R32 (2022, 2024)
- African Champ.: (gold) (2019, 2020, 2022, 2023, 2024)
Medal record
Women's judo
Representing Algeria
African Games
Gold medal – first place	2023 Accra	‍–‍63 kg
Silver medal – second place	2019 Rabat	‍–‍63 kg
Silver medal – second place	2023 Accra	Mixed team
African Championships
Gold medal – first place	2019 Cape Town	‍–‍63 kg
Gold medal – first place	2020 Antananarivo	‍–‍63 kg
Gold medal – first place	2022 Oran	‍–‍63 kg
Gold medal – first place	2023 Casablanca	‍–‍63 kg
Gold medal – first place	2024 Cairo	‍–‍63 kg
Bronze medal – third place	2016 Tunis	‍–‍70 kg
Bronze medal – third place	2017 Antananarivo	‍–‍63 kg
Bronze medal – third place	2018 Tunis	‍–‍63 kg
Bronze medal – third place	2021 Dakar	‍–‍63 kg
Bronze medal – third place	2025 Abidjan	‍–‍63 kg
IJF Grand Slam
Bronze medal – third place	2024 Dushanbe	‍–‍63 kg
IJF Grand Prix
Bronze medal – third place	2023 Perth	‍–‍63 kg
African Junior Championships
Bronze medal – third place	2011 Antananarivo	‍–‍70 kg
Summer Universiade
Silver medal – second place	2017 Taipei	‍–‍63 kg
Mediterranean Games
Bronze medal – third place	2022 Oran	‍–‍63 kg
Islamic Solidarity Games
Gold medal – first place	2021 Konya	‍–‍63 kg
Bronze medal – third place	2017 Baku	‍–‍63 kg
Bronze medal – third place	2021 Konya	Women's team

Profile at external databases
- IJF: 9589
- JudoInside.com: 78783
- Updated on 27 April 2025

Amina Belkadi (Arabic: أمينة بلقاضي; born 10 November 1992) is an Algerian judoka. She has been a gold medalist at the African Games and a five-time gold medalist at the African Judo Championships. She also won bronze at the Islamic Solidarity Games in 2017 and at the Mediterranean Games in 2022.

== Career ==
Belkadi won the gold medal in the women's 63 kg event at the 2019 African Judo Championships held in Cape Town, South Africa. In the same year, she also competed in the women's 63 kg event at the 2019 World Judo Championships held in Tokyo, Japan.

In 2020, Belkadi also won the gold medal in her event at the African Judo Championships held in Antananarivo, Madagascar.

In January 2021, Belkadi competed in the women's 63 kg event at the Judo World Masters in Doha, Qatar. At the 2021 African Judo Championships in Dakar, Senegal, she won a bronze medal in the 63 kg event. In June 2021, she was eliminated in her first match in the women's 63 kg event at the 2021 World Judo Championships held in Budapest, Hungary.

She won a bronze medal in the women's 63 kg event at the 2022 Mediterranean Games held in Oran, Algeria.

== Achievements ==
Year	Tournament	Place	Weight class
2019	African Games	2nd	−63 kg
2022	Mediterranean Games	3rd	−63 kg
2024	African Games	1st	−63 kg

Olympic Games
Preceded by Amel Melih; Mohamed Flissi	Flag bearer for Algeria; Paris 2024 with Yasser Triki	Succeeded by Incumbent
