= Bishreltiin Khorloodoi =

Emirati judoka (born 1998)

Personal information
- Nationality: Mongolian
- Born: 29 May 1998 (age 28)
- Occupation: Judoka

Sport
- Country: Mongolia (until 2022); United Arab Emirates (since 2023)
- Sport: Judo
- Weight class: ‍–‍52 kg

Achievements and titles
- Olympic Games: R16 (2024)
- World Champ.: 5th (2022)
- Asian Champ.: (gold) (2024)
Medal record
Women's judo
Representing United Arab Emirates
Asian Games
Silver medal – second place	2023 Hangzhou	‍–‍52 kg
Asian Championships
Gold medal – first place	2024 Hong Kong	‍–‍52 kg
Silver medal – second place	2025 Bangkok	‍–‍52 kg
IJF Grand Slam
Gold medal – first place	2024 Abu Dhabi	‍–‍52 kg
Silver medal – second place	2026 Tashkent	‍–‍52 kg
Silver medal – second place	2026 Astana	‍–‍52 kg
Bronze medal – third place	2024 Tokyo	‍–‍52 kg
Bronze medal – third place	2026 Ulaanbaatar	‍–‍52 kg
IJF Grand Prix
Bronze medal – third place	2023 Dushanbe	‍–‍52 kg
Representing Mongolia
Asian Championships
Bronze medal – third place	2022 Nur‑Sultan	‍–‍52 kg
IJF Grand Slam
Bronze medal – third place	2020 Düsseldorf	‍–‍52 kg
Bronze medal – third place	2021 Paris	‍–‍52 kg
Bronze medal – third place	2021 Baku	‍–‍52 kg
Bronze medal – third place	2021 Abu Dhabi	‍–‍52 kg
Bronze medal – third place	2022 Ulaanbaatar	‍–‍52 kg
IJF Grand Prix
Silver medal – second place	2019 Tashkent	‍–‍52 kg
Bronze medal – third place	2015 Ulaanbaatar	‍–‍48 kg
Asian Cadet Championships
Gold medal – first place	2014 Hong Kong	‍–‍48 kg

Profile at external databases
- IJF: 13864, 76190
- JudoInside.com: 17904
- Updated on 19 June 2026

Bishreltiin Khorloodoi (Mongolian: Бишрэлтийн Хорлоодой; born 29 May 1998) is a Mongolian judoka, who currently represents the United Arab Emirates in international judo. She is the bronze medallist in the -52 kg at the 2021 Judo Grand Slam Paris

At the 2021 Judo Grand Slam Abu Dhabi held in Abu Dhabi, United Arab Emirates, she won one of the bronze medals in her event. She is also taking part in the 2024 Olympics.
