= Rémi Feuillet =

Mauritian judoka (born 1992)

Personal information
- Born: 22 December 1992 (age 33)
- Occupation: Judoka

Sport
- Country: Mauritius
- Sport: Judo
- Weight class: ‍–‍90 kg

Achievements and titles
- Olympic Games: R32 (2020, 2024)
- World Champ.: 7th (2021)
- African Champ.: (silver) (2024)
- Commonwealth Games: (gold) (2026)
Medal record
Men's judo
Representing Mauritius
African Games
Bronze medal – third place	2019 Rabat	‍–‍90 kg
African Championships
Silver medal – second place	2024 Cairo	‍–‍90 kg
Bronze medal – third place	2020 Antananarivo	‍–‍90 kg
Bronze medal – third place	2021 Dakar	‍–‍90 kg
Bronze medal – third place	2022 Oran	‍–‍90 kg
Bronze medal – third place	2023 Casablanca	‍–‍90 kg
Bronze medal – third place	2025 Abidjan	‍–‍90 kg
Bronze medal – third place	2026 Nairobi	‍–‍90 kg
Commonwealth Games
Gold medal – first place	2026 Glasgow	‍–‍90 kg

Profile at external databases
- IJF: 50777
- JudoInside.com: 77348
- Updated on 2 August 2026

Rémi Feuillet (born 22 December 1992) is a Mauritian judoka.

Feuillet was introduced to Judo by his father Frédéric who is a former national technical director of the Mauritian judo team. He is based in France and lives in Val-d'Oise and trains in Villiers-le-Bel.

Feuillet won four consecutive bronze medals at the African Judo Championships and finished seventh at the 2021 World Judo Championships. He was selected to compete at the 2020 Summer Games and drawn against Shoichiro Mukai in the first round.

At the 2026 Commonwealth Games Feuillet won the gold medal in the men's 90 kg event.
