= Judo at the 2019 African Games =

Judo Judo at the 2019 African Games
- Venue: Prince Moulay Abdallah Sports Complex
- Location: Rabat, Morocco
- Dates: 17–18 August
- Competitors: 212 from 34 nations

Competition at external databases
- Links: IJF • JudoInside

Judo at the 2019 African Games was held on 17 and 18 August 2019 in Rabat, Morocco.

The event served as a qualifier for the 2020 Summer Olympics in Tokyo, Japan.

== Participating nations ==
- Algeria (18)
- Angola (4)
- Benin (1)
- Botswana (8)
- Burkina Faso (5)
- Cameroon (8)
- Central African Republic (2)
- Chad (8)
- Democratic Republic of the Congo (11)
- Djibouti (3)
- Egypt (15)
- Gabon (7)
- The Gambia (2)
- Ghana (5)
- Ivory Coast (4)
- Kenya (10)
- Libya (2)
- Madagascar (8)
- Malawi (2)
- Mali (4)
- Mauritania (1)
- Mauritius (9)
- Morocco (18)
- Mozambique (3)
- Niger (5)
- Nigeria (4)
- Senegal (9)
- South Africa (5)
- Sudan (3)
- Tanzania (3)
- Togo (2)
- Tunisia (11)
- Zambia (5)
- Zimbabwe (7)

== Medal table ==
* Host nation (Morocco)

Rank	Nation	Gold	Silver	Bronze	Total
1	Egypt (EGY)	4	0	4	8
2	Morocco (MAR)*	2	5	4	11
3	Algeria (ALG)	2	3	6	11
4	Tunisia (TUN)	2	3	3	8
5	Gabon (GAB)	2	0	1	3
6	Cameroon (CMR)	1	1	2	4
7	Senegal (SEN)	1	0	1	2
8	South Africa (RSA)	0	2	0	2
9	Angola (ANG)	0	0	2	2
9	Mauritius (MRI)	0	0	2	2
11	Chad (CHA)	0	0	1	1
11	Democratic Republic of the Congo (COD)	0	0	1	1
11	Djibouti (DJI)	0	0	1	1
Totals (13 entries)		14	14	28	56

== Medal summary ==
=== Men ===
Event	Gold	Silver	Bronze
−60 kg	Issam Bassou; Morocco	Fraj Dhouibi; Tunisia	Younes Saddiki; Morocco Salim Rebahi; Algeria
−66 kg	Wail Ezzine; Algeria	Abderrahmane Boushita; Morocco	Boubekeur Rebahi; Algeria Mohamed Abdelmawgoud; Egypt
−73 kg	Ali Abdelmouati; Egypt	Ahmed El Meziati; Morocco	Acácio Quifucussa; Angola Aden-Alexandre Houssein; Djibouti
−81 kg	Abdelrahman Mohamed; Egypt	Hamza Kabdani; Morocco	Imad Eddine Cherouk; Algeria Abdalla Osman; Egypt
−90 kg	Ali Hazem; Egypt	Oussama Mohamed Snoussi; Tunisia	Dieudonne Dolassem; Cameroon Rémi Feuillet; Mauritius
−100 kg	Ramadan Darwish; Egypt	Mohammed Lahboub; Morocco	Luc Manongho; Gabon Prince Kosi Samuzu; Democratic Republic of the Congo
+100 kg	Mbagnick Ndiaye; Senegal	Mohamed Sofiane Belrekaa; Algeria	Faïcel Jaballah; Tunisia Sébastien Perrine; Mauritius

=== Women ===
Event	Gold	Silver	Bronze
−48 kg	Chaimae Eddinari; Morocco	Geronay Whitebooi; South Africa	Hadjer Mecerem; Algeria Aziza Chakir; Morocco
−52 kg	Faïza Aissahine; Algeria	Soumiya Iraoui; Morocco	Lamia Eddinari; Morocco Meriem Moussa; Algeria
−57 kg	Ghofran Khelifi; Tunisia	Yamina Halata; Algeria	Diassonema Mucungui; Angola Lamiaa Alzenan; Egypt
−63 kg	Hélène Wezeu Dombeu; Cameroon	Amina Belkadi; Algeria	Sofia Belattar; Morocco Meriem Bjaoui; Tunisia
−70 kg	Karene Agono; Gabon	Nihel Landolsi; Tunisia	Ayuk Otay Arrey Sophina; Cameroon Demos Memneloum; Chad
−78 kg	Sarah Myriam Mazouz; Gabon	Unelle Snyman; South Africa	Sarra Mzougui; Tunisia Kaouthar Ouallal; Algeria
+78 kg	Nihel Cheikh Rouhou; Tunisia	Hortence Vanessa Mballa Atangana; Cameroon	Monica Sagna; Senegal Kariman Shafik; Egypt
