= Kariman Shafik =

Egyptian judoka (born 1996)

Personal information
- Born: 1 September 1996 (age 29)
- Occupation: Judoka

Sport
- Country: Egypt
- Sport: Judo
- Weight class: +78 kg
Medal record
Women's judo
Representing Egypt
African Games
Bronze medal – third place	2019 Rabat	+78 kg
African Judo Championships
Bronze medal – third place	2019 Cape Town	+78 kg

Profile at external databases
- IJF: 8599
- JudoInside.com: 93135

Kariman Shafik (born 1 September 1996) is an Egyptian judoka. She won one of the bronze medals in the women's +78 kg event at the 2019 African Games held in Rabat, Morocco.

A few months earlier, she won one of the bronze medals in the women's +78 kg event at the 2019 African Judo Championships held in Cape Town, South Africa.

== Achievements ==
Year	Tournament	Place	Weight class
2019	African Judo Championships	3rd	+78 kg
2019	African Games	3rd	+78 kg
