= 2023 African Judo Championships =

Judo competition

2023 Judo African Judo Championships
- Venue: Salle du Complexe Sportif Mohammed V
- Location: Casablanca, Morocco
- Dates: 8–10 September 2023
- Competitors: 192 from 36 nations

Champions
- Mixed team: Algeria

Competition at external databases
- Links: IJF • JudoInside

The 2023 African Judo Championships are the 44th edition of the African Judo Championships and were held at the Stade Mohammed V in Casablanca, Morocco from 8 to 10 September 2023, with the mixed team event taking place on the championships' last day.

== Medal summary ==
=== Men's events ===
| Event | Gold | Silver | Bronze |
|---|---|---|---|
| Extra-lightweight (−60 kg) | Youssry Samy (EGY) | Adel Hamada (EGY) | Simon Zulu (ZAM) |
| Extra-lightweight (−60 kg) | Youssry Samy (EGY) | Adel Hamada (EGY) | Moussa Diop (SEN) |
| Half-lightweight (−66 kg) | Mohamed Abdelmawgoud (EGY) | Abderrahmane Boushita (MAR) | Aziz Harbi (TUN) |
| Half-lightweight (−66 kg) | Mohamed Abdelmawgoud (EGY) | Abderrahmane Boushita (MAR) | Ahmed Abdelrahman (EGY) |
| Lightweight (−73 kg) | Messaoud Dris (ALG) | Hassan Doukkali (MAR) | Aleddine Ben Chalbi (TUN) |
| Lightweight (−73 kg) | Messaoud Dris (ALG) | Hassan Doukkali (MAR) | Faye Njie (GAM) |
| Half-middleweight (−81 kg) | Achraf Moutii (MAR) | Abdelrahman Abdelghany (EGY) | Abdelrahman Mohamed (EGY) |
| Half-middleweight (−81 kg) | Achraf Moutii (MAR) | Abdelrahman Abdelghany (EGY) | Ahmed El Meziati (MAR) |
| Middleweight (−90 kg) | Omar Elramly (EGY) | Abderahmane Diao (SEN) | Rémi Feuillet (MRI) |
| Middleweight (−90 kg) | Omar Elramly (EGY) | Abderahmane Diao (SEN) | Ryan Dacosta (SEN) |
| Half-heavyweight (−100 kg) | Mustapha Bouamar (ALG) | Libasse Ndiaye (SEN) | Koussay Ben Ghares (TUN) |
| Half-heavyweight (−100 kg) | Mustapha Bouamar (ALG) | Libasse Ndiaye (SEN) | Ahmed Fayad (EGY) |
| Heavyweight (+100 kg) | Mbagnick Ndiaye (SEN) | Bubacar Mane (GBS) | Mohamed El Mehdi Lili (ALG) |
| Heavyweight (+100 kg) | Mbagnick Ndiaye (SEN) | Bubacar Mane (GBS) | Mohammed Lahboub (MAR) |

Source results:

=== Women's events ===
| Event | Gold | Silver | Bronze |
|---|---|---|---|
| Extra-lightweight (−48 kg) | Oumaima Bedioui (TUN) | Aziza Chakir (MAR) | Geronay Whitebooi (RSA) |
| Extra-lightweight (−48 kg) | Oumaima Bedioui (TUN) | Aziza Chakir (MAR) | Amira Ben Ayed (TUN) |
| Half-lightweight (−52 kg) | Soumiya Iraoui (MAR) | Faïza Aissahine (ALG) | Charne Griesel (RSA) |
| Half-lightweight (−52 kg) | Soumiya Iraoui (MAR) | Faïza Aissahine (ALG) | Rahma Tibi (TUN) |
| Lightweight (−57 kg) | Mariana Esteves (GUI) | Zouleiha Abzetta Dabonne (CIV) | Jasmine Martin (RSA) |
| Lightweight (−57 kg) | Mariana Esteves (GUI) | Zouleiha Abzetta Dabonne (CIV) | Andreza Antonio (ANG) |
| Half-middleweight (−63 kg) | Amina Belkadi (ALG) | Diassonema Mucungui (ANG) | Dounia Slimani (MAR) |
| Half-middleweight (−63 kg) | Amina Belkadi (ALG) | Diassonema Mucungui (ANG) | Nadia Guimendego (CAF) |
| Middleweight (−70 kg) | Aina Laura Rasoanaivo Razafy (MAD) | Maria Niangi (ANG) | Oulaya Khairi (MAR) |
| Middleweight (−70 kg) | Aina Laura Rasoanaivo Razafy (MAD) | Maria Niangi (ANG) | Nihel Bouchoucha (TUN) |
| Half-heavyweight (−78 kg) | Marie Branser (GUI) | Georgika Wesly Djengue Moune (CMR) | Ange Ciella Niragira (BDI) |
| Half-heavyweight (−78 kg) | Marie Branser (GUI) | Georgika Wesly Djengue Moune (CMR) | Arij Akkab (TUN) |
| Heavyweight (+78 kg) | Sarra Mzougui (TUN) | Richelle Anita Soppi Mbella (CMR) | Tracy Durhone (MRI) |
| Heavyweight (+78 kg) | Sarra Mzougui (TUN) | Richelle Anita Soppi Mbella (CMR) | Monica Sagna (SEN) |

Source results:

=== Mixed team event ===
| Event | Gold | Silver | Bronze |
|---|---|---|---|
| Mixed team | Algeria | Morocco | Cameroon |
| Mixed team | Algeria | Morocco | Angola |

=== Medal table ===
* Host nation (Morocco)

| Rank | Nation | Gold | Silver | Bronze | Total |
|---|---|---|---|---|---|
| 1 | Algeria (ALG) | 4 | 1 | 1 | 6 |
| 2 | Egypt (EGY) | 3 | 2 | 3 | 8 |
| 3 | Morocco (MAR)* | 2 | 4 | 4 | 10 |
| 4 | Tunisia (TUN) | 2 | 0 | 7 | 9 |
| 5 | Guinea (GUI) | 2 | 0 | 0 | 2 |
| 6 | Senegal (SEN) | 1 | 2 | 3 | 6 |
| 7 | Madagascar (MAD) | 1 | 0 | 0 | 1 |
| 8 | Angola (ANG) | 0 | 2 | 2 | 4 |
| 9 | Cameroon (CMR) | 0 | 2 | 1 | 3 |
| 10 | Guinea-Bissau (GBS) | 0 | 1 | 0 | 1 |
| 10 | Ivory Coast (CIV) | 0 | 1 | 0 | 1 |
| 12 | South Africa (RSA) | 0 | 0 | 3 | 3 |
| 13 | Mauritius (MRI) | 0 | 0 | 2 | 2 |
| 14 | Burundi (BDI) | 0 | 0 | 1 | 1 |
| 14 | Central African Republic (CAF) | 0 | 0 | 1 | 1 |
| 14 | Gambia (GAM) | 0 | 0 | 1 | 1 |
| 14 | Zambia (ZAM) | 0 | 0 | 1 | 1 |
| Totals (17 entries) | | 15 | 15 | 30 | 60 |
