= Judo at the 2022 Mediterranean Games =

Judo competition

Judo Judo at the 2022 Mediterranean Games
- Venue: Oran
- Location: Oran, Algeria
- Dates: 29 June – 1 July

Competition at external databases
- Links: IJF • EJU • JudoInside

The Judo event at the 2022 Mediterranean Games was held at the Mohammed ben Ahmed CCO (Hall 03 and 06) in Oran, Algeria, from 29 June to 1 July 2022.

== Medal table ==
* Host nation (Algeria)

Rank	Nation	Gold	Silver	Bronze	Total
1	Spain	3	1	3	7
2	Kosovo	3	0	2	5
3	Turkey	3	0	1	4
4	Algeria*	1	2	1	4
5	France	1	1	5	7
6	Serbia	1	1	2	4
7	Egypt	1	0	1	2
7	Slovenia	1	0	1	2
9	Tunisia	0	3	3	6
10	Italy	0	3	2	5
11	Croatia	0	1	2	3
12	Greece	0	1	1	2
12	Morocco	0	1	1	2
14	Bosnia and Herzegovina	0	0	3	3
Totals (14 entries)		14	14	28	56

== Medalists ==
=== Men ===
Event	Gold	Silver	Bronze
Extra-lightweight; 60 kg	Francisco Garrigós; Spain	Fraj Dhouibi; Tunisia	Youssry Samy; Egypt
Extra-lightweight; 60 kg	Francisco Garrigós; Spain	Fraj Dhouibi; Tunisia	Issam Bassou; Morocco
Half-lightweight; 66 kg	Mohamed Abdelmawgoud; Egypt	Matteo Piras; Italy	Maxime Gobert; France
Half-lightweight; 66 kg	Mohamed Abdelmawgoud; Egypt	Matteo Piras; Italy	Strahinja Bunčić; Serbia
Lightweight; 73 kg	Messaoud Dris; Algeria	Hassan Doukkali; Morocco	Aleddine Ben Chalbi; Tunisia
Lightweight; 73 kg	Messaoud Dris; Algeria	Hassan Doukkali; Morocco	Akil Gjakova; Kosovo
Half-middleweight; 81 kg	Vedat Albayrak; Turkey	Kenny Komi Bedel; Italy	Alfonso Urquiza; Spain
Half-middleweight; 81 kg	Vedat Albayrak; Turkey	Kenny Komi Bedel; Italy	Tizie Gnamien; France
Middleweight; 90 kg	Mikail Özerler; Turkey	Theodoros Tselidis; Greece	Toni Miletić; Bosnia and Herzegovina
Middleweight; 90 kg	Mikail Özerler; Turkey	Theodoros Tselidis; Greece	Tristani Mosakhlishvili; Spain
Half-heavyweight; 100 kg	Nikoloz Sherazadishvili; Spain	Mustapha Bouamar; Algeria	Joris Agbegnenou; France
Half-heavyweight; 100 kg	Nikoloz Sherazadishvili; Spain	Mustapha Bouamar; Algeria	Aleksandar Kukolj; Serbia
Heavyweight +100 kg	Vito Dragič; Slovenia	Mohamed Sofiane Belrekaa; Algeria	Lorenzo Agro Sylvan; Italy
Heavyweight +100 kg	Vito Dragič; Slovenia	Mohamed Sofiane Belrekaa; Algeria	Wahib Hdiouech; Tunisia

=== Women ===
Event	Gold	Silver	Bronze
Extra-lightweight; 48 kg	Mélanie Vieu; France	Milica Nikolić; Serbia	Maruša Štangar; Slovenia
Extra-lightweight; 48 kg	Mélanie Vieu; France	Milica Nikolić; Serbia	Oumaima Bedioui; Tunisia
Half-lightweight; 52 kg	Distria Krasniqi; Kosovo	Ana Viktorija Puljiz; Croatia	Chloé Devictor; France
Half-lightweight; 52 kg	Distria Krasniqi; Kosovo	Ana Viktorija Puljiz; Croatia	Ana Pérez; Spain
Lightweight; 57 kg	Marica Perišić; Serbia	Giulia Caggiano; Italy	Anđela Samardžić; Bosnia and Herzegovina
Lightweight; 57 kg	Marica Perišić; Serbia	Giulia Caggiano; Italy	Flaka Loxha; Kosovo
Half-middleweight; 63 kg	Laura Fazliu; Kosovo	Cristina Cabaña; Spain	Amina Belkadi; Algeria
Half-middleweight; 63 kg	Laura Fazliu; Kosovo	Cristina Cabaña; Spain	Iva Oberan; Croatia
Middleweight; 70 kg	Ai Tsunoda; Spain	Nihel Landolsi; Tunisia	Elisavet Teltsidou; Greece
Middleweight; 70 kg	Ai Tsunoda; Spain	Nihel Landolsi; Tunisia	Martina Esposito; Italy
Half-heavyweight; 78 kg	Loriana Kuka; Kosovo	Chloé Buttigieg; France	Petrunjela Pavić; Croatia
Half-heavyweight; 78 kg	Loriana Kuka; Kosovo	Chloé Buttigieg; France	Nurcan Yılmaz; Turkey
Heavyweight +78 kg	Kayra Sayit; Turkey	Nihel Cheikh Rouhou; Tunisia	Larisa Cerić; Bosnia and Herzegovina
Heavyweight +78 kg	Kayra Sayit; Turkey	Nihel Cheikh Rouhou; Tunisia	Coralie Hayme; France
