= Jung Ye-rin (judoka) =

South Korean judoka (born 1996)

Personal information
- Born: 15 July 1996 (age 29) Daegu, South Korea
- Occupation: Judoka

Sport
- Country: South Korea
- Sport: Judo
- Weight class: ‍–‍52 kg

Achievements and titles
- Olympic Games: R32 (2024)
- World Champ.: R16 (2022)
- Asian Champ.: (bronze) (2022, 2023)
Medal record
Women's judo
Representing South Korea
Olympic Games
Bronze medal – third place	2024 Paris	Mixed team
Asian Championships
Bronze medal – third place	2022 Nur‑Sultan	‍–‍52 kg
Asian Games
Bronze medal – third place	2023 Hangzhou	‍–‍52 kg
IJF Grand Slam
Bronze medal – third place	2022 Ulaanbaatar	‍–‍52 kg
Bronze medal – third place	2024 Dushanbe	‍–‍52 kg

Profile at external databases
- IJF: 65967
- JudoInside.com: 56049
- Updated on 7 August 2024

Jung Ye-rin (born 15 July 1996) is a judoka who competes internationally for South Korea. She won a bronze medal in the mixed team judo competition at the 2024 Summer Olympics.
