= Hadjer Mecerem =

Algerian judoka (born 1996)

Personal information
- Born: 23 August 1996 (age 30)

Sport
- Country: Algeria
- Sport: Judo
- Weight class: 48 kg
Medal record
Women's judo
Representing Algeria
African Games
Bronze medal – third place	2019 Rabat	−48 kg
African Judo Championships
Silver medal – second place	2019 Cape Town	−48 kg
Bronze medal – third place	2018 Tunis	−48 kg

Hadjer Mecerem (born 23 August 1996) is an Algerian judoka. She is a bronze medalist at the African Games.

== Career ==
In 2018, she competed in the women's 48 kg event at the Mediterranean Games held in Tarragona, Spain.

In 2019, she won the silver medal in the women's 48 kg event at the 2019 African Judo Championships held in Cape Town, South Africa.

== Achievements ==
Year	Tournament	Place	Weight class
2021	African Senior Championships 2021	5th	−48 kg
2019	Dakar African Open 2019	3rd	−48 kg
2019	African Games	3rd	−48 kg
2018	Yaounde African Open 2018	1st	−48 kg
2018	Dakar African Open 2018	3rd	−48 kg
2018	African Senior Championships 2018	3rd	−48 kg
