= Larissa Pimenta =

Brazilian judoka (born 1999)

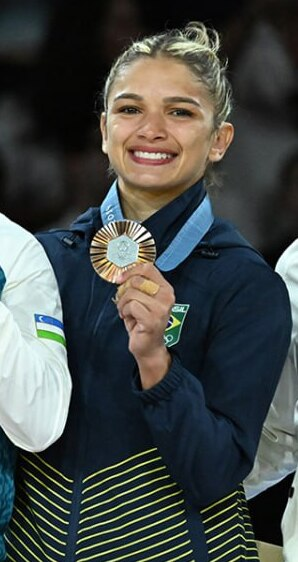
- Pimenta in 2024

Personal information
- Born: 1 March 1999 (age 27) São Vicente, São Paulo, Brazil
- Occupation: Judoka

Sport
- Country: Brazil
- Sport: Judo
- Weight class: ‍–‍52 kg

Achievements and titles
- Olympic Games: (bronze) (2024)
- World Champ.: 7th (2022, 2024)
- Pan American Champ.: (gold) (2019, 2021, 2022, 2023, 2024, 2026)
Medal record
Women's judo
Representing Brazil
Olympic Games
Bronze medal – third place	2024 Paris	‍–‍52 kg
Bronze medal – third place	2024 Paris	Mixed team
World Championships
Bronze medal – third place	2021 Budapest	Mixed team
Pan American Games
Gold medal – first place	2019 Lima	‍–‍52 kg
Gold medal – first place	2023 Santiago	‍–‍52 kg
Silver medal – second place	2023 Santiago	Mixed team
Pan American Championships
Gold medal – first place	2019 Lima	‍–‍52 kg
Gold medal – first place	2021 Guadalajara	‍–‍52 kg
Gold medal – first place	2022 Lima	‍–‍52 kg
Gold medal – first place	2023 Calgary	‍–‍52 kg
Gold medal – first place	2024 Rio de Janeiro	‍–‍52 kg
Gold medal – first place	2026 Panama City	‍–‍52 kg
Bronze medal – third place	2020 Guadalajara	‍–‍52 kg
South American Games
Gold medal – first place	2018 Cochabamba	‍–‍52 kg
IJF Grand Slam
Silver medal – second place	2019 Brasilia	‍–‍52 kg
Silver medal – second place	2024 Astana	‍–‍52 kg
Bronze medal – third place	2019 Baku	‍–‍52 kg
Bronze medal – third place	2020 Paris	‍–‍52 kg
Bronze medal – third place	2023 Tel Aviv	‍–‍52 kg
IJF Grand Prix
Gold medal – first place	2024 Linz	‍–‍52 kg
Bronze medal – third place	2019 Tbilisi	‍–‍52 kg
Bronze medal – third place	2019 Antalya	‍–‍52 kg
Bronze medal – third place	2026 Qingdao	‍–‍52 kg
World Juniors Championships
Bronze medal – third place	2019 Marrakesh	‍–‍52 kg
Pan American Junior Championships
Gold medal – first place	2017 Cancún	‍–‍48 kg
Gold medal – first place	2018 La Paz	‍–‍52 kg
Pan American Cadet Championships
Gold medal – first place	2016 Cordoba	‍–‍48 kg
Military World Games
Bronze medal – third place	2019 Wuhan	Women's team

Profile at external databases
- IJF: 23949
- JudoInside.com: 106574
- Updated on 26 June 2026

Larissa Cincinato Pimenta (born 1 March 1999) is a Brazilian judoka. A two-time Olympian, she won the bronze medal at the 2024 Summer Olympics in Paris. At the 2019 Pan American Games held in Lima, Peru, she won the gold medal in the 52 kg event. She is also a five-time gold medalist in her event at the Pan American Judo Championships.

== Career ==
=== 2018–2020 ===
At 19 years old, Pimenta won the gold medal in the women's 52 kg event at the 2018 South American Games held in Cochabamba, Bolivia.

Pimenta obtained a bronze medal at the 2019 Judo Grand Prix Tbilisi, her first in Grand Prix tournaments. At the 2019 Judo Grand Prix Antalya she took her second bronze in a row. At the 2019 Pan American Judo Championships, held in Lima, Peru, Pimenta won the gold medal in the 52 kg event. She reached the podium for the first time in a Grand Slam (the tournament that gives the most points in the judo ranking after the Olympic Games, the World Championships and the World Masters) at the 2019 Judo Grand Slam Baku, obtaining a bronze. She obtained her biggest career title to date by winning the 2019 Pan American Games. In that same year, she competed in the women's 52 kg event at the 2019 World Judo Championships held in Tokyo, Japan. Pimenta won her first match, against Raguib Abdourahman of Djibouti, but was eliminated in her next match, against Uta Abe of Japan, who went on to win the gold medal and would later become Olympic champion. In October she was also a silver medalist in the 2019 Judo Grand Slam Brasilia.

In February 2020, Pimenta won bronze at the 2020 Judo Grand Slam Paris by defeating Sarah Menezes. In November 2020, she also won one of the bronze medals in the women's 52 kg event at the Pan American Judo Championships held in Guadalajara, Mexico.

In 2021, she competed in the women's 52 kg event at the Judo World Masters held in Doha, Qatar, being surpassed by ippon in the first fight by South Korean Park Da-sol. In March 2021 she finished 5th in the 2021 Judo Grand Slam Tbilisi. In April, she secured the gold medal in her event at the 2021 Pan American Judo Championships held in Guadalajara, Mexico. In June 2021, Pimenta won one of the bronze medals in the mixed team event at the 2021 World Judo Championships held in Budapest, Hungary. She also competed in the women's 52 kg event where she was eliminated in her second match.

=== 2020 Summer Olympics ===
In 2021, Pimenta represented Brazil at the 2020 Summer Olympics in Tokyo, Japan. She competed in the women's 52 kg event where she was eliminated in her second match by eventual gold medalist Uta Abe of Japan. Pimenta was also part of the mixed teams competition, losing her fights for twice facing competitors in higher weight categories.

=== 2021–2024 ===
Pimenta won gold at the 2022 Pan American-Oceania Judo Championships in Lima, becoming three-time champion of the competition. She reached the quarterfinals of the 2022 World Judo Championships, but then lost two fights in a row, finishing in 7th place.

In February 2023, she achieved a bronze at the 2023 Judo Grand Slam Tel Aviv. Pimenta won gold at the 2023 Pan American-Oceania Judo Championships in Calgary, becoming a four-time champion of the competition. With the gold medal at the 2023 Pan American Games, she became a two-time champion of the competition, in addition to later winning a silver medal with the Brazilian mixed team. She also finished 5th in the 2023 Judo Grand Slam Tokyo.

In March 2024, she obtained her first title at Grand Prix level by obtaining gold in the 2024 Judo Grand Prix Linz. Pimenta won gold at the 2024 Pan American-Oceania Judo Championships in Rio de Janeiro, becoming five-time champion of the competition. She got the silver medal at the 2024 Judo Grand Slam Astana. At the 2024 World Judo Championships, Pimenta repeated her 2022 performance, where she reached the quarterfinals, but subsequently lost two fights, finishing in 7th place. Odette Giuffrida, who beat Pimenta in the quarterfinals, ended up as tournament champion.

=== 2024 Summer Olympics ===
At the 2024 Summer Olympics in Paris, Pimenta reached the quarterfinals by defeating Olympic bronze medalist and world runner-up Chelsie Giles. There, she lost to another Tokyo Olympic medalist, Amandine Buchard, going to the repechage. She defeated 2024 World Championship bronze medalist Mascha Ballhaus and in the bronze match, she defeated world champion and Olympic runner-up Odette Giuffrida to win the bronze medal, the first ever Olympic medal won by a woman athlete from the Esporte Clube Pinheiros club. While this time Pimenta did not fight in the mixed team competition, she still won a bronze medal for being listed as a possible contestant.

== Achievements ==
Year	Tournament	Place	Weight class
2018	South American Games	1st	−52 kg
2019	Pan American Championships	1st	−52 kg
2019	Pan American Games	1st	−52 kg
2019	Military World Games	3rd	Team
2020	Pan American Championships	3rd	−52 kg
2021	Pan American Championships	1st	−52 kg
2021	World Championships	3rd	Mixed team
2022	Pan American Championships	1st	−52 kg
2023	Pan American Championships	1st	−52 kg
2023	Pan American Games	1st	−52 kg
2023	Pan American Games	2nd	Mixed team
2024	Pan American-Oceania Judo Championships	1st	−52 kg
2024	Summer Olympics	3rd	−52 kg
2024	Summer Olympics	3rd	Mixed team
