= Chelsie Giles =

British judoka (born 1997)

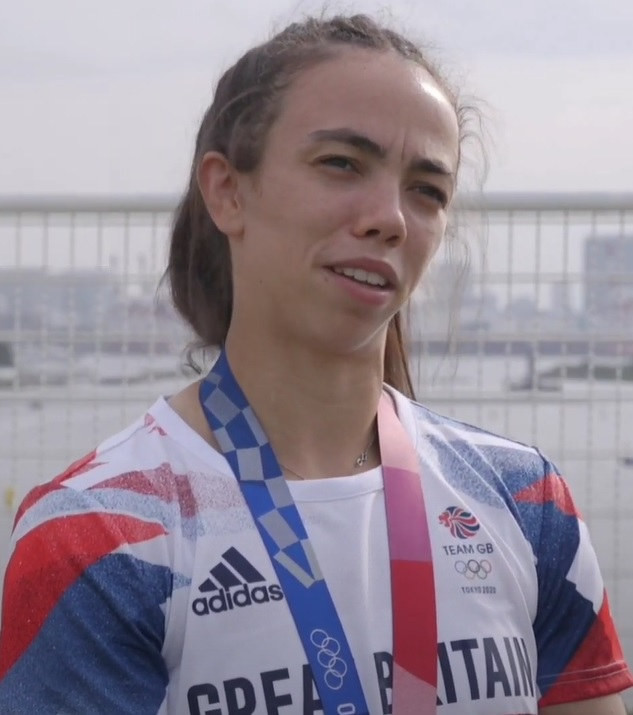
- Giles in 2021 after the 2020 Summer Olympics

Personal information
- Born: 25 January 1997 (age 29) Coventry, England
- Occupation: Judoka

Sport
- Country: United Kingdom
- Sport: Judo
- Weight class: ‍–‍52 kg

Achievements and titles
- Olympic Games: (bronze) (2020)
- World Champ.: (silver) (2022)
- European Champ.: (gold) (2022)
Medal record
Women's judo
Representing Great Britain
Olympic Games
Bronze medal – third place	2020 Tokyo	‍–‍52 kg
World Championships
Silver medal – second place	2022 Tashkent	‍–‍52 kg
European Games
Bronze medal – third place	2019 Minsk	‍–‍52 kg
European Championships
Gold medal – first place	2022 Sofia	‍–‍52 kg
Bronze medal – third place	2023 Montpellier	‍–‍52 kg
World Masters
Silver medal – second place	2022 Jerusalem	‍–‍52 kg
IJF Grand Slam
Gold medal – first place	2021 Tel Aviv	‍–‍52 kg
Gold medal – first place	2023 Tel Aviv	‍–‍52 kg
Silver medal – second place	2021 Tbilisi	‍–‍52 kg
Silver medal – second place	2021 Baku	‍–‍52 kg
Silver medal – second place	2021 Abu Dhabi	‍–‍52 kg
Silver medal – second place	2023 Antalya	‍–‍52 kg
Silver medal – second place	2024 Paris	‍–‍52 kg
Silver medal – second place	2024 Antalya	‍–‍52 kg
Bronze medal – third place	2018 Abu Dhabi	‍–‍52 kg
Bronze medal – third place	2019 Abu Dhabi	‍–‍52 kg
Bronze medal – third place	2024 Tashkent	‍–‍52 kg
IJF Grand Prix
Gold medal – first place	2023 Almada	‍–‍52 kg
Silver medal – second place	2018 Antalya	‍–‍52 kg
Bronze medal – third place	2018 Budapest	‍–‍52 kg
Bronze medal – third place	2019 Zagreb	‍–‍52 kg

Profile at external databases
- IJF: 17275
- JudoInside.com: 81821
- Updated on 29 March 2024

Chelsie Giles (born 25 January 1997) is a British judoka. She won the gold medal in the women's 52 kg event at the 2022 European Judo Championships held in Sofia, Bulgaria. She won one of the bronze medals in her event at the 2020 Summer Olympics in Tokyo, Japan. Giles' medal was the first awarded to Great Britain at the 2020 Summer Olympics.

== Early life and education ==
Giles is from Coventry. She graduated from the University of Wolverhampton with a degree in business management.

== Career ==
Giles won the half-lightweight division at the British Judo Championships in 2014, 2015 and 2017. In 2017, she competed in the women's 52 kg event at the 2017 European Judo Championships held in Warsaw, Poland. A year later, Giles competed in the women's 52 kg event at the 2018 World Judo Championships held in Baku, Azerbaijan. She was eliminated in her second match by Charline Van Snick of Belgium.

At the 2018 Judo Grand Prix Antalya held in Antalya, Turkey, Giles won the silver medal in her event. She also won one of the bronze medals in the women's 52 kg event at the 2018 Judo Grand Prix Budapest held in Budapest, Hungary. Giles also won her first Grand Slam medal: one of the bronze medals at the 2018 Judo Grand Slam Abu Dhabi held in Abu Dhabi, United Arab Emirates.

In 2019, Giles competed in the women's 52 kg event at the World Judo Championships held in Tokyo, Japan. In 2021, she competed in the women's 52 kg event at the Judo World Masters held in Doha, Qatar. A month later, she won the gold medal in her event at the Judo Grand Slam Tel Aviv held in Tel Aviv, Israel. At the 2021 Judo Grand Slam Tbilisi held in Tbilisi, Georgia, she won the silver medal in her event. In June 2021, Giles competed in the women's 52 kg event at the World Judo Championships held in Budapest, Hungary where she was eliminated in her second match by eventual bronze medallist Fabienne Kocher of Switzerland.

At the 2020 Summer Olympics in Tokyo, Japan, Giles won the first medal of the competition for Team GB, winning one of the bronze medals in the women's 52 kg event. A few months later, she won the silver medal in her event at the 2021 Judo Grand Slam Baku held in Baku, Azerbaijan. At the 2021 Judo Grand Slam Abu Dhabi held in Abu Dhabi, United Arab Emirates, she won the silver medal in her event.

Giles won the gold medal in the women's 52 kg event at the 2022 European Judo Championships held in Sofia, Bulgaria. In the final, she defeated Amandine Buchard of France.

Selected for 2024 Summer Olympics in Paris, France, Giles had a bye into the second round where she lost on golden score to Larissa Pimenta from Brazil.

== Major results ==
2019
(bronze) European Games, 52 kg, Minsk, Belarus
2021
(bronze) Summer Olympics, 52 kg, Tokyo, Japan
2022
(gold) European Championships, 52 kg, Sofia, Bulgaria
(silver) World Championships, 52 kg, Tashkent, Uzbekistan
2023
(bronze) European Championships, 52 kg, Montpellier, France
