= Souad Bellakehal =

Algerian judoka

Personal information
- Born: 23 March 1992 (age 34)

Sport
- Country: Algeria
- Sport: Judo
- Weight class: 70 kg
Medal record
Women's judo
Representing Algeria
African Games
African Judo Championships
Silver medal – second place	2022 Oran	−70 kg
Bronze medal – third place	2021 Dakar	−70 kg
Silver medal – second place	2018 Tunisia	−70 kg African Championships - Results Women 2018

Souad Bellakehal (born March 23, 1992) is a judoka who competes internationally for Algeria.

== Achievement ==
Bellakehal won a silver medal at the 2015 All African Games in Brazzaville and another silver medal at the African Championships in 2014. She has 5 silver medals and 2 bronze medals.
