= Salimata Fofana =

Ivorian judoka

Personal information
- Born: 17 August 1997 (age 28)
- Occupation: Judoka

Sport
- Country: Ivory Coast
- Sport: Judo
Medal record
Women's judo
Representing Ivory Coast
African Games
Bronze medal – third place	2015 Brazzaville	−52 kg
African Championships
Silver medal – second place	2021 Dakar	−52 kg
Bronze medal – third place	2016 Tunis	−52 kg
Bronze medal – third place	2019 Cape Town	−52 kg
Bronze medal – third place	2020 Antananarivo	−52 kg

Profile at external databases
- IJF: 15666
- JudoInside.com: 59675

Salimata Fofana is an Ivorian judoka. She won one of the bronze medals in the women's 52-kg event at the 2015 African Games held in Brazzaville, Republic of the Congo.

She won one of the bronze medals in the women's 52-kg event at the 2016 African Judo Championships held in Tunis, Tunisia and at the 2019 African Judo Championships held in Cape Town, South Africa.

In 2020, she also won one of the bronze medals in women's 52-kg event at the 2020 African Judo Championships held in Antananarivo, Madagascar. At the 2021 African Judo Championships held in Dakar, Senegal, she won the silver medal in her event.
