= African Junior Judo Championships =

Judo competition

- Current event or competition: 2026 African Junior Judo Championships

Competition details
- Discipline: Judo
- Type: Annual
- Organiser: African Judo Union (AJU)

History
- First edition: Tunis 2000
- Editions: 22
- Most recent: Yaoundé 2024

The African Junior Judo Championships are the highest level of African judo competition for juniors, 21 years of age or less. The championships are held every year by the African Judo Union, and qualified judoka compete in their respective categories as representatives of their countries. The first edition was held in Tunis, Tunisia in 2000.

== Competitions ==
Edition	Year	Dates	City and host country	Venue	Countries	Athletes	Top country	Ref.
1	2000	... May	Tunis, Tunisia					
2	2002	31 July–5 August	Abidjan, Ivory Coast				Algeria	
3	2003	9–10 August	Ouagadougou, Burkina Faso					
4	2004	17 July	Grande Rivière, Mauritius					
5	2005	7–8 July	Tunis, Tunisia				Tunisia	
6	2006	30 June	..., South Africa				Tunisia	
7	2007							
8	2008	11–13 July	Niamey, Niger					
9	2009	24–26 July	Oujda, Morocco	Salle Omnisports de l'Université Mohamed 1			Algeria	
10	2010	31 July	Dakar, Senegal				Tunisia	
11	2011	22–23 July	Antananarivo, Madagascar			110	Algeria	
12	2012	2–7 October	Gaborone, Botswana		19	103	Tunisia	
13	2013	2–3 July	Algiers, Algeria		19	97	Tunisia	
14	2014	21–23 March	Tunis, Tunisia		21	162	Egypt	
15	2015	22–24 July	Sharm El Sheikh, Egypt		10	91	Algeria	
16	2016	21–23 July	Casablanca, Morocco		12	79	Tunisia	
17	2017	5–7 May	Cairo, Egypt		9	93	Tunisia	
18	2018	10 May	Bujumbura, Burundi	Judo Sport Center	14	111	Algeria	
19	2019	2–3 May	Dakar, Senegal	Dakar Arena	17	120	Algeria	
—	2020	Canceled due to the COVID-19 pandemic in Africa						
—	2021	Canceled due to the COVID-19 pandemic in Africa						
20	2022	21–22 July	Nairobi, Kenya	Safaricom Indoor Arena	21	141	Egypt	
21	2023	29 July	Antananarivo, Madagascar	Palais des Sports de Mahamasina	17	137	Egypt	
22	2024	15 August	Yaoundé, Cameroon	Palais des Sports Warda	17	164	Tunisia	
23	2025	19–20 July	Luanda, Angola		16	160	Morocco	
24	2026	25 July	Casablanca, Morocco		20	175	Egypt	

== Team competitions ==
Mixed teams
Year	Location	Gold	Silver	Bronze		Ref.
2022	Nairobi, Kenya	Egypt	Angola	Cameroon	Senegal	
2026	Casablanca, Morocco	Morocco	Algeria	Angola	Cameroon	

== See also ==
- African Judo Championships
- African Cadet Judo Championships
