= Judo at the African Games =

Judo competition

- Current event or competition: Judo at the 2023 African Games
- Judo

Competition details
- Discipline: Judo
- Type: Quadrennial

History
- First edition: Brazzaville 1965
- Editions: 13
- Most recent: Accra 2023

Judo was an African Games event at its inaugural edition in 1965 and has continued to feature prominently at the competition in each of its subsequent editions.

== Editions ==
| Games | Year | Host city | Events | | | Best nation |
| Games | Year | Host city | Men | Women | Mixed | Best nation |
|---|---|---|---|---|---|---|
| I | 1965 | (Republic of the Congo) Brazzaville | 6 | —N/a | —N/a | Senegal |
| II | 1973 | (Nigeria) Lagos | 6 | —N/a | —N/a | Senegal |
| III | 1978 | (Algeria) Algiers | 8 | —N/a | —N/a | Algeria |
| IV | 1987 | (Kenya) Nairobi | 8 | —N/a | —N/a | Egypt |
| V | 1991 | (Egypt) Cairo | 8 | —N/a | —N/a | Egypt |
| VI | 1995 | (Zimbabwe) Harare | 8 | 8 | —N/a | Tunisia |
| VII | 1999 | (South Africa) Johannesburg | 8 | 8 | —N/a | Tunisia |
| VIII | 2003 | (Nigeria) Abuja | 8 | 8 | —N/a | Algeria |
| IX | 2007 | (Algeria) Algiers | 8 | 8 | —N/a | Algeria |
| X | 2011 | (Mozambique) Maputo | 7 | 7 | —N/a | Tunisia |
| XI | 2015 | (Republic of the Congo) Brazzaville | 7 | 7 | —N/a | Algeria |
| XII | 2019 | (Morocco) Rabat | 7 | 7 | —N/a | Egypt |
| XIII | 2024 | (Ghana) Accra | 7 | 7 | 1 | Tunisia |

== Medal table ==
As of 2023:

| Rank | Nation | Gold | Silver | Bronze | Total |
|---|---|---|---|---|---|
| 1 | Algeria (ALG) | 45 | 27 | 45 | 117 |
| 2 | Tunisia (TUN) | 35 | 28 | 43 | 106 |
| 3 | Egypt (EGY) | 32 | 20 | 28 | 80 |
| 4 | Senegal (SEN) | 14 | 10 | 22 | 46 |
| 5 | Cameroon (CMR) | 5 | 16 | 28 | 49 |
| 6 | Nigeria (NGR) | 4 | 9 | 38 | 51 |
| 7 | Ivory Coast (CIV) | 4 | 6 | 14 | 24 |
| 8 | Gabon (GAB) | 4 | 5 | 6 | 15 |
| 9 | Morocco (MAR) | 3 | 10 | 8 | 21 |
| 10 | South Africa (RSA) | 2 | 9 | 16 | 27 |
| 11 | Mauritius (MRI) | 1 | 7 | 8 | 16 |
| 12 | Angola (ANG) | 1 | 2 | 10 | 13 |
| 13 | Madagascar (MAD) | 1 | 1 | 11 | 13 |
| 14 | Mali (MLI) | 1 | 1 | 2 | 4 |
| 15 | Burkina Faso (BUR) | 1 | 1 | 1 | 3 |
| 15 | Zimbabwe (ZIM) | 1 | 1 | 1 | 3 |
| 17 | Guinea (GUI) | 1 | 0 | 1 | 2 |
| 18 | Republic of the Congo (CGO) | 0 | 2 | 3 | 5 |
| 19 | The Gambia (GAM) | 0 | 1 | 0 | 1 |
| 20 | (Democratic Republic of the Congo) DR Congo (COD) | 0 | 0 | 4 | 4 |
| 21 | Zambia (ZAM) | 0 | 0 | 3 | 3 |
| 22 | Central African Republic (CAF) | 0 | 0 | 2 | 2 |
| 22 | Djibouti (DJI) | 0 | 0 | 2 | 2 |
| 22 | Ghana (GHA) | 0 | 0 | 2 | 2 |
| 22 | Libya (LBA) | 0 | 0 | 2 | 2 |
| 26 | Chad (CHA) | 0 | 0 | 1 | 1 |
| 26 | Guinea-Bissau (GBS) | 0 | 0 | 1 | 1 |
| 26 | Mozambique (MOZ) | 0 | 0 | 1 | 1 |
| 26 | Niger (NIG) | 0 | 0 | 1 | 1 |
| 26 | Togo (TOG) | 0 | 0 | 1 | 1 |
| Totals (30 entries) | | 155 | 156 | 305 | 616 |

== Medalists ==
=== Men's ===
Super lightweight

| Games | Gold | Silver | Bronze |
|---|---|---|---|
| 1978 | Ahmed Moussa (ALG) | Bou Aidara (SEN) | Habib Dridi (TUN); Bole (CIV) |
| 1987 | Abdel Hakim Harkat (ALG) | Mohamed Nabil (EGY) | Hebert Pamulo (ANG); Clement Bordelais (MRI) |
| 1991 | Ahmed El-Sayed (EGY) | Fayçal Bousbiat (ALG) | Osayimwense Osaigbovo (NGR); Francisco de Souza (ANG) |
| 1995 | Makrem Ayed (TUN) | Henry Wessels (RSA) | Tarek Diaa (EGY); Amar Meridja (ALG) |
| 1999 | Makrem Ayed (TUN) | Wouter Van Zyl (RSA) | Ali Atef (EGY); Omar Rebahi (ALG) |
| 2003 | Anis Lounifi (TUN) | Abdelouahed Idrissi Chorfi (MAR) | Atef Mustapha (EGY); Omar Rebahi (ALG) |
| 2007 | Omar Rebahi (ALG) | Atef Mustapha (EGY) | Elie Norbert (MAD); Deza Elie Gbate (CIV) |
| 2011 | Lyes Saker (ALG) | Eniafe Solomon (NGA) | Nayr Pedro (ANG); Mohamed El Hadi Elkawisah (LBA) |
| 2015 | Ahmed Abelrahman (EGY) | Kamel Haroune (ALG) | Fraj Dhouibi (TUN); Nayr Garcia Pedro (ANG) |
| 2019 | Issam Bassou (MAR) | Fraj Dhouibi (TUN) | Younes Saddiki (MAR) Salim Rebahi (ALG) |

Half lightweight

| Games | Gold | Silver | Bronze |
|---|---|---|---|
| 1978 | Saïd Lahcène (ALG) | Hassan Ben Gamra (TUN) | Said Sabi (EGY); Sasly (MAR) |
| 1987 | Meziane Dahmani (ALG) | Abdelfattah Samir (EGY) | Pierre-Yves Séné (SEN); James Mafuta (ZAM) |
| 1991 | Abdel Hakim Harkat (ALG) | Kelvin Idehe (NGR) | Moustafa Kamel (EGY); James Sibenge (ZIM) |
| 1995 | Noureddine Yagoubi (ALG) | Haitham El Hossainy (EGY) | Sami Moumen (TUN); Terrence Parkin (RSA) |
| 1999 | Amar Meridja (ALG) | Anis Lounifi (TUN) | Henry Wessels (RSA); Bourama Mariko (MLI) |
| 2003 | Amar Meridja (ALG) | Jean-Claude Cameroun (CMR) | Mohammed Dawa (EGY); Makrem Ayed (TUN) |
| 2007 | Mounir Benamadi (ALG) | Amin El Hady (EGY) | Wakunguma Shapa (ZAM); Ragheb Karchoud (TUN) |
| 2011 | Ahmed Awad (EGY) | Youcef Nouari (ALG) | Hocem Khalfaoui (TUN); Siyabulela Mabulu (RSA) |
| 2015 | Houd Zourdani (ALG) | Ali Abdelmouaty (EGY) | Harnold Koussou Ouvelou (GAB); Mohamed Abdelmawgoud (EGY) |
| 2019 | Wail Ezzine (ALG) | Abderrahmane Boushita (MAR) | Boubekeur Rebahi (ALG) Mohamed Abdelmawgoud (EGY) |

Lightweight

| Games | Gold | Silver | Bronze |
|---|---|---|---|
| 1965 | Xavier Boissy (SEN) | Alexandre Makaya (CGO) | Vatosoa Ramarokoto (MAD) |
| 1973 | Abdelaziz Zaier (TUN) | Jaksos Djidji (MAD) | Ahmed Moussa (ALG); Jacques Ndiaye (SEN) |
| 1978 | Djillali Ben Brahim (ALG) | Belmahfoud (MAR) | Nouoayi (TOG); Lamine Wade (SEN) |
| 1987 | Mohamed Meridja (ALG) | Anwar Khaled (EGY) | Hassan Ben Gamra (TUN); Mamudu Adamu (NGR) |
| 1991 | Majemite Omagbaluwaje (NGR) | Sameh Abdallah (EGY) | Luc Rasoanaivo-Razafy (MAD); Eddy André (MRI) |
| 1995 | Hassen Moussa (TUN) | David Koissy (CIV) | Noriaspola (MAD); Meziane Dahmani (ALG) |
| 1999 | Hassen Moussa (TUN) | Suleman Musa (NGA) | Haitham El Hossainy (EGY); Noureddine Yagoubi (ALG) |
| 2003 | Noureddine Yagoubi (ALG) | Haitham El Hossainy (EGY) | Hassen Moussa (TUN); Suleman Musa (NGR) |
| 2007 | Amar Meridja (ALG) | Haitham El Hossainy (EGY) | Anis Dkhili (TUN); Nsa Bashir (NGA) |
| 2011 | Larbi Grini (ALG) | Gideon van Zyl (RSA) | Hussein Hafiz (EGY); Nsa Bassey-Isa (NGR) |
| 2015 | Mohamed Mohyeldin (EGY) | Faye Njie (GAM) | Emmanuel Nartey (GHA); Edson Madeira (MOZ) |
| 2019 | Ali Abdelmouati (EGY) | Ahmed El Meziati (MAR) | Acácio Quifucussa (ANG) Aden-Alexandre Houssein (DJI) |

Welterweight

| Games | Gold | Silver | Bronze |
|---|---|---|---|
| 1965 | Lamine Touré (MLI) | Zacharie Ndoumbe (CMR) | Mehrez Belhaj (TUN) |
| 1973 | Mohamed Belmir (ALG) | Emmanuel Ndoumbè Ngoua (CMR) | Lamine Wade (SEN); Zaketé (CGO) |
| 1978 | Pascal Ouattara (CIV) | Iddedir (MAR) | Kamel Imansouren (ALG); Ilyès Mahjoub (TUN) |
| 1987 | Hussein Abdelhak (EGY) | Salah Rekik (TUN) | Adda Bouziane (ALG); Abubacar Ghan Zimo (NGR) |
| 1991 | Salah Rekik (TUN) | Suleman Musa (NGR) | Abdel-Wahab Newawi (EGY); Jean-Jacques Rakotomalala (MAD) |
| 1995 | Suleman Musa (NGR) | Lotfi Aissaoui (TUN) | Lyes Cherifi (ALG); Ahmed El-Sayed (EGY) |
| 1999 | Majemite Omagbaluwaje (NGA) | Patrick Matangi (ZIM) | Jean-paul Azie (MRI); Brahima Guindo (MLI) |
| 2003 | Adil Belgaïd (MAR) | Abdessalem Arous (TUN) | Aboumedan El Sayed (EGY); Brahima Guindo (MLI) |
| 2007 | Youssef Badra (TUN) | Abderrahmane Benamadi (ALG) | Matthew Jago (RSA); Hatem Abd el Akher (EGY) |
| 2011 | Abderrahmane Benamadi (ALG) | Ângelo António (ANG) | Jude Solomon (NGR); Fetra Ratsimiziva (MAD) |
| 2015 | Mohamed Abdelaal (EGY) | Paul Kibikai (GAB) | Abdelaziz Ben Ammar (TUN); Ali Hazem (EGY) |
| 2019 | Abdelrahman Mohamed (EGY) | Hamza Kabdani (MAR) | Imad Eddine Cherouk (ALG) Abdalla Osman (EGY) |

Middleweight

| Games | Gold | Silver | Bronze |
|---|---|---|---|
| 1965 | Samir Hassan (SEN) | Jean-Victor Akono (CMR) | Jonas Cissé (SEN) |
| 1973 | Pascal Ouattara (CIV) | Mohsen Mahjoub (TUN) | Boubker Slimani (MAR); Fodil Goumrassa (ALG) |
| 1978 | Tahar Abbad (ALG) | Mohamed Zouagh (MAR) | Henri-Richard Lobe (CMR); Mohamed Dione (SEN) |
| 1987 | Akilong Diabone (SEN) | West Iqiebor (NGR) | Labad Salahamar (EGY); Youssef Hamadouche (ALG) |
| 1991 | Isaac Angbo (CIV) | Habib Hassine (TUN) | Walid Halim Aly (EGY); Yacine Silini (ALG) |
| 1995 | Iskander Hachicha (TUN) | Jean-Claude Raphael (MRI) | Dean Hughes (RSA); Serge Biwole Abolo (CMR) |
| 1999 | Iskander Hachicha (TUN) | Jean-Claude Raphael (MRI) | Ali Elshrif (EGY); Khaled Meddah (ALG) |
| 2003 | Iskander Hachicha (TUN) | Khaled Meddah (ALG) | Ashraf Bahgat (EGY); Jean-Claude Raphael (MRI) |
| 2007 | Hesham Mesbah (EGY) | Amar Benikhlef (ALG) | Pape Ousmane Ndiaye (SEN); Mohamed Bouguerra (TUN) |
| 2011 | Hesham Mesbah (EGY) | Lyès Bouyacoub (ALG) | Dieudonné Dolassem (CMR); Kinapeya Kone (CIV) |
| 2015 | Abderrahmane Benamadi (ALG) | Oussama Mahmoud Snoussi (TUN) | Dieudonné Dolassem (CMR); Zack Piontek (RSA) |
| 2019 | Ali Hazem (EGY) | Oussama Mohamed Snoussi (TUN) | Dieudonné Dolassem (CMR) Rémi Feuillet (MRI) |

Light heavyweight

| Games | Gold | Silver | Bronze |
|---|---|---|---|
| 1965 | Georges Sourial (EGY) | Mohamed Hachicha (TUN) | Sogossira Sanou (VOL) |
| 1973 | Abdoulaye Djiba (SEN) | Tahar Abbad (ALG) | Lahbib Bouazzaoui (MAR); Oualla (CIV) |
| 1978 | Ahmed Mahrous (EGY) | Fodil Goumrassa (ALG) | Essambo Ewane (CMR); Abdoulaye Djiba (SEN) |
| 1987 | Abdel Majid Senoussi (TUN) | Alaa-Eddine El-Orfi (EGY) | Djamel Fares (ALG); Eferbo Inagha (NGR) |
| 1991 | Aiman El-Shewy (EGY) | Djamel Fares (ALG) | Joseph Ndjumbi (GAB); West Iqiebor (NGR) |
| 1995 | Bassel El-Gharbawy (EGY) | William Akboro (RSA) | Salah Rekik (TUN); Antonio Felicité (MRI) |
| 1999 | Bassel El-Gharbawy (EGY) | Sami Belgroun (ALG) | Sadok Khalgui (TUN); Antonio Felicité (MRI) |
| 2003 | Bassel El-Gharbawy (EGY) | Sami Belgroun (ALG) | Sadok Khalgui (TUN); Antonio Felicité (MRI) |
| 2007 | Franck Moussima (CMR) | Bara Ndiaye (SEN) | Hassane Azzoun (ALG); Mohamed Ben Saleh (LBA) |
| 2011 | Franck Moussima (CMR) | Ramadan Darwish (EGY) | Kambere Shabani (COD); Yacine Meskine (ALG) |
| 2015 | Lyès Bouyacoub (ALG) | Anis Ben Khaled (TUN) | Baboukar Mane (SEN); Seidou Nji Mouluh (CMR) |
| 2019 | Ramadan Darwish (EGY) | Mohammed Lahboub (MAR) | Luc Manongho (GAB) Prince Kosi Samuzu (COD) |

Heavyweight

| Games | Gold | Silver | Bronze |
|---|---|---|---|
| 1965 | Moussa Dao (CIV) | Seydou Drabo (VOL) | Ahmed Chabi (ALG) |
| 1973 | Tijini Ben Kassou (MAR) | Hassan El Shiwi (EGY) | M'Bagnick M'Bodj (SEN) ? |
| 1978 | Abdoulaye Koté (SEN) | Isidore Silas (CMR) | Mohamed Bellatar (MAR); Abdessalem Besbes (TUN) |
| 1987 | Mohamed Rashwan (EGY) | Salawa Dauda (NGR) | Bechir Kiiari (TUN); Boualem Miloudi (ALG) |
| 1991 | Khalifa Diouf (SEN) | Mohamed Rashwan (EGY) | Mourad Zaghouani (TUN); Ferhat Challal (ALG) |
| 1995 | Slim Agrebi (TUN) | Khalifa Diouf (SEN) | Kamel Larbi (ALG); Steeve Nguema Ndong (GAB) |
| 1999 | Mohamed Bouaichaoui (ALG) | Steeve Nguema Ndong (GAB) | Paul Holder (RSA); Lokofo Ngila (DRC) |
| 2003 | Mohamed Bouaichaoui (ALG) | Steeve Nguema Ndong (GAB) | Anis Chedly (TUN); Ahmed Baly (EGY) |
| 2007 | Anis Chedly (TUN) | Mohamed Bouaichaoui (ALG) | Denis Oliveira (ANG); Djegui Bathily (SEN) |
| 2011 | Faïcel Jaballah (TUN) | Islam El Shehaby (EGY) | Joseph Bebeze (CMR); Bilal Zouani (ALG) |
| 2015 | Faïcel Jaballah (TUN) | Bilal Zouani (ALG) | Deo Gracia Ngokaba (CGO); Khaled Selim (EGY) |
| 2019 | Mbagnick Ndiaye (SEN) | Mohamed Sofiane Belrekaa (ALG) | Faïcel Jaballah (TUN) Sébastien Perrine (MRI) |

Open

| Games | Gold | Silver | Bronze |
|---|---|---|---|
| 1973 | Habib Guèye (SEN) | Tijini Ben Kassou (MAR) | Daouda (NGR); Boussaad Hamane (ALG) |
| 1978 | Abdoulaye Koté (SEN) | Mohamed Bellatar (MAR) | Isidore Silas (CMR); Ahmed Mahrous (EGY) |
| 1987 | Mohamed Rashwan (EGY) | Bechir Kiiari (TUN) | West Iqiebor (NGR); Helder de Carvalho (ANG) |
| 1991 | Mohamed Rashwan (EGY) | Ferhat Challal (ALG) | West Iqiebor (NGR); Eddy André (MRI) |
| 1995 | Khalifa Diouf (SEN) | Serge Biwole Abolo (CMR) | Suleman Musa (NGR); Kamel Larbi (ALG) |
| 1999 | Bassel El-Gharbawy (EGY) | Jean-Claude Raphael (MRI) | Majemite Omagbaluwaje (NGA); Sami Belgroun (ALG) |
| 2003 | Bassel El-Gharbawy (EGY) | Yacine Silini (ALG) | Iskander Hachicha (TUN); Amady Mbaré Diop (SEN) |
| 2007 | Mohamed Bouaichaoui (ALG) | Djegui Bathily (SEN) | Amadou Kanate (CIV); Anis Chedly (TUN) |

=== Women's ===
Super lightweight

| Games | Gold | Silver | Bronze |
|---|---|---|---|
| 1995 | Salima Souakri (ALG) | Dolly Moothoo (MRI) | Ariane Soleil Rasoafaniry (MAD); Nassiabassi Thompson (NGR) |
| 1999 | Hayet Rouini (TUN) | Dolly Moothoo (MRI) | Tania Tallie (RSA); Lovelyn Orji-Ben (NGA) |
| 2003 | Soraya Haddad (ALG) | Hajer Barhoumi (TUN) | Moses Kazuk (ANG); Philomène Bata (CMR) |
| 2007 | Meriem Moussa (ALG) | Sandrine Ilendou (GAB) | Chahnez M'barki (TUN); Elsa Honorine Oyama Enye (CGO) |
| 2011 | Amani Khalfaoui (TUN) | Sandrine Ilendou (GAB) | Franca Audu (NGA); Sabrina Saidi (ALG) |
| 2015 | Sabrina Saidi (ALG) | Olfa Saoudi (TUN) | Taciana Lima (GBS); Fatima Bashir (NGA) |
| 2019 | Chaimae Eddinari (MAR) | Geronay Whitebooi (RSA) | Hadjer Mecerem (ALG) Aziza Chakir (MAR) |

Half lightweight

| Games | Gold | Silver | Bronze |
|---|---|---|---|
| 1995 | Liezl Downing (RSA) | Mimose Géry (MRI) | Lynda Mekzine (ALG); Geneviève Nga Onana (CMR) |
| 1999 | Salima Souakri (ALG) | Geneviève Nga Onana (CMR) | Naina Ravaoarisoa (MAD); Catherine Ekuta (NGA) |
| 2003 | Salima Souakri (ALG) | Hortense Diédhiou (SEN) | Naina Ravaoarisoa (MAD); Chahnez M'barki (TUN) |
| 2007 | Hortense Diédhiou (SEN) | Amani Khalfaoui (TUN) | Justina Agatahi (NGR); Soraya Haddad (ALG) |
| 2011 | Soraya Haddad (ALG) | Ngandeu Weyinjam (CMR) | Victoria Agbodobiri (NGA); Sando Esther (ZAM) |
| 2015 | Djazia Haddad (ALG) | Hela Ayari (TUN) | Franca Audu (NGA); Salimata Fofana (CIV) |
| 2019 | Faïza Aissahine (ALG) | Soumiya Iraoui (MAR) | Lamia Eddinari (MAR) Meriem Moussa (ALG) |

Lightweight

| Games | Gold | Silver | Bronze |
|---|---|---|---|
| 1995 | Debbie Warren-Jeans (ZIM) | Raoudha Chaari (TUN) | Nadia Khadem (ALG); Domoina Rabeantoandro (MAD) |
| 1999 | Françoise Nguele (CMR) | Lynda Mekzine (ALG) | Karima Dhaouadi (TUN); Rose Marie Kouaho (CIV) |
| 2003 | Catherine Ekuta (NGR) | Lila Latrous (ALG) | Karima Dhaouadi (TUN); Mariam Bangoura (GUI) |
| 2007 | Lila Latrous (ALG) | Hajer Barhoumi (TUN) | Catherine Ekuta (NGA); Fary Seye (SEN) |
| 2011 | Nesria Jelassi (TUN) | Hortense Diédhiou (SEN) | Grace Deutcho (CMR); Raissa Lebomie (NGR) |
| 2015 | Ratiba Tariket (ALG) | Zouleiha Abzetta Dabonne (CIV) | Léa Buet (SEN); Hortense Diédhiou (SEN) |
| 2019 | Ghofran Khelifi (TUN) | Yamina Halata (ALG) | Diassonema Mucungui (ANG) Lamiaa Alzenan (EGY) |

Welterweight

| Games | Gold | Silver | Bronze |
|---|---|---|---|
| 1995 | Priscilla Cherry-Lebon (MRI) | Sanama Agoume (CMR) | Shioma Enenwuke (NGR); Hajer Tbessi (TUN) |
| 1999 | Nesria Traki (TUN) | Sanama Agoume (CMR) | Henriette Möller (RSA); Yasmin Afifi (EGY) |
| 2003 | Saida Dhahri (TUN) | Henriette Möller (RSA) | Kahina Saidi (ALG); Maryann Ekeada (NGR) |
| 2007 | Kahina Saidi (ALG) | Nesria Jelassi (TUN) | Funmilola Adebayo (NGR); Adjane Koumba (GAB) |
| 2011 | Séverine Nébié (BFA) | Esther Augustine (NGR) | Kahina Saidi (ALG); Fary Seye (SEN) |
| 2015 | Hélène Wezeu Dombeu (CMR) | Souad Belakhal (ALG) | Szandra Szögedi (GHA); Meriem Bjaoui (TUN) |
| 2019 | Hélène Wezeu Dombeu (CMR) | Amina Belkadi (ALG) | Sofia Belattar (MAR) Meriem Bjaoui (TUN) |

Middleweight

| Games | Gold | Silver | Bronze |
|---|---|---|---|
| 1995 | Mélanie Engoang (GAB) | Sally Buckton (RSA) | Marcelline Mpkegue (CMR); Nesria Traki (TUN) |
| 1999 | Saida Dhahri (TUN) | Sally Buckton (RSA) | Léa Zahoui Blavo (CIV); Chicmah Obodo (NGA) |
| 2003 | Gisèle Mendy (SEN) | Rachida Ouerdane (ALG) | Christiane Ndoumbe (CMR); Loveth Ilekhaize (NGR) |
| 2007 | Rachida Ouerdane (ALG) | Gisèle Mendy (SEN) | Antónia Moreira (ANG); Marisca Loots (RSA) |
| 2011 | Houda Miled (TUN) | Antónia Moreira (ANG) | Mbala Felicité (CMR); Winifred Gofit (NGR) |
| 2015 | Antónia Moreira (ANG) | Houda Miled (TUN) | Aicha Ben Abderahmane (ALG); Nihel Bouchoucha (TUN) |
| 2019 | Karene Agono (GAB) | Nihel Landolsi (TUN) | Ayuk Otay Arrey Sophina (CMR) Demos Memneloum (CHA) |

Light heavyweight

| Games | Gold | Silver | Bronze |
|---|---|---|---|
| 1995 | Nora Abdelhamid (EGY) | Chahira Boussetta (ALG) | Grace Dick (NGR); Lorinda Bence (RSA) |
| 1999 | Mélanie Engoang (GAB) | Nora Abdelhamid (EGY) | Christy Obekpa (NGA); Chahla Atailia (ALG) |
| 2003 | Houda Ben Daya (TUN) | Mélanie Engoang (GAB) | Akissa Monney (CIV); Chahla Atailia (ALG) |
| 2007 | Houda Miled (TUN) | Vivian Yusuf (NGR) | Christelle Okodombe (CMR); Kahina Hadid (ALG) |
| 2011 | Hana Mareghni (TUN) | Honorine Mafeguim (CMR) | Amina Temmar (ALG); Georgette Sagna (CMR) |
| 2015 | Kaouthar Ouallal (ALG) | Sarra Mzougui (TUN) | Rita Ebere (NGR); Hortence Vanessa Mballa Atangana (CMR) |
| 2019 | Sarah Myriam Mazouz (GAB) | Unelle Snyman (RSA) | Sarra Mzougui (TUN) Kaouthar Ouallal (ALG) |

Heavyweight

| Games | Gold | Silver | Bronze |
|---|---|---|---|
| 1995 | Heba Hefny (EGY) | Marguerita Goua Lou (CIV) | Elyze Strydom (RSA); Samira Oueslati (TUN) |
| 1999 | Heba Hefny (EGY) | Adja Marieme Diop (SEN) | Marguerita Goua Lou (CIV); Chemabo Awah (CMR) |
| 2003 | Samah Ramadan (EGY) | Tatiana Bvegadzi (CGO) | Marguerita Goua Lou (CIV); Insaf Yahyaoui (TUN) |
| 2007 | Samah Ramadan (EGY) | Adijat Ayuba (EGY) | Souhir Madani (ALG); Nihel Cheikh Rouhou (TUN) |
| 2011 | Nihel Cheikh Rouhou (TUN) | Sonia Asselah (ALG) | Monica Sagna (SEN); Dechantal Fokou (CMR) |
| 2015 | Nihel Cheikh Rouhou (TUN) | Sonia Asselah (ALG) | Sahar Trabelsi (TUN); Nadine Wetie Diodjo (CMR) |
| 2019 | Nihel Cheikh Rouhou (TUN) | Hortence Vanessa Mballa Atangana (CMR) | Monica Sagna (SEN) Kariman Shafik (EGY) |

Open

| Games | Gold | Silver | Bronze |
|---|---|---|---|
| 1995 | Heba Hefny (EGY) | Marguerita Goua Lou (CIV) | Marcelline Mpkegue (CMR); Adja Marieme Diop (SEN) |
| 1999 | Heba Hefny (EGY) | Marguerita Goua Lou (CIV) | Christy Obekpa (NGR); Nesria Traki (TUN) |
| 2003 | Heba Hefny (EGY) | Insaf Yahyaoui (TUN) | Esther Sully (NGR); Chahla Atailia (ALG) |
| 2007 | Nihel Cheikh Rouhou (TUN) | Christelle Okodombe (CMR) | Souhir Madani (ALG); Samah Ramadan (EGY) |
