= Morocco at the 1972 Summer Olympics =

- IOC code: MAR
- NOC: Moroccan Olympic Committee

in Munich
- Medals: Gold 0 Silver 0 Bronze 0 Total 0

Summer Olympics appearances (overview)
- 1960; 1964; 1968; 1972; 1976; 1980; 1984; 1988; 1992; 1996; 2000; 2004; 2008; 2012; 2016; 2020; 2024

Morocco competed at the 1972 Summer Olympics in Munich, West Germany.

== Results by event ==
=== Athletics ===
Men's 200 metres

- Omar Chokhmane

- Quarterfinal 1

Men's 400 metres

- Omar Ghizlat

- Quarterfinal 1

Men's 800 metres

- Mohamed Makdouf

- Heat — did not start

Men's 1,500 metres

- Mohamed Makdouf

- Heat — 3, 7th place

Men's 5,000 metres

- Hamadi Haddou

- Heat — did not start

Men's 4 × 400 metres Relay

- Omar Ghizlat, Omar Chokhmane, Salah Fettouh, Mohamed Bouboud (Ahmed Hasnaoui did not start)
- Heat — 1, 6th place

Men's shot put

- Lahcen Samsam Akka
- 15th place

Women's 100 metres

- Fatima El-Faquir

- Heat — 2, 7th place

Women's 200 metres

- Fatima El-Faquir

- Heat — 6, 7th place

Women's 800 metres

- Fatima El-Faquir

- Heat — 5, 7th place

=== Boxing ===
Men's Flyweight (– 51 kg)

- Ali Ouabbou

- First Round — bye
- Second Round — lost to Chris Ius (CAN), 2:3

Men's Featherweight (– 57 kg)

- Lahcen Maghfour

- First Round — lost to Billy Taylor (GBR), 5:0

Men's Lightweight (– 60 kg)

- Mohamed Sourour

- First Round — lost to László Orbán (HUN), 5:0

=== Football ===
==== Men's team competition ====
- First Round (Group A)

- Drew with the United States (0-0)
- Lost to West Germany (0-3)
- Defeated Malaysia (6-0)

- Second Round (Group 2)

- Lost to the Soviet Union (0-3)
- Lost to Denmark (1-3)
- Lost to Poland (0-5) → did not advance, 8th place over-all

- Team Roster

- Mohamed Hazzaz
- Ahmed Belkorchi
- Boujemaâ Benkhrif
- Khalifa Elbakhti
- Mohamed Elfilali
- Ahmed Faras
- Abdelmajid Hadry
- Mohamed Hazzaz
- Larbi Ihardane
- Abdelfattah Jafri
- Abdellah Lamrani
- Mohamed Merzaq
- Ahmed Tati Mohamed
- Ghazouani Mouhoub
- Ahmed Najah
- Abdallah Tazi
- Mustapha Yaghcha
- Abdelali Zahraoui

=== Judo ===
Men's Lightweight (63 kg)

- Moustafa Belhmira

- Pool A, Round of 32 — lost to Karl-Heinz Werner (GDR)

Men's Middleweight (80 kg)

- Boubker Slimani

- Pool B, Round of 32 — lost to Lutz Lischka (AUT)

Men's Heavyweight (+93 kg)

- Tijini Ben Kassou

- Pool B, Round of 32 — defeated Püreviin Dagvasüren (MSL)
- Pool B, Round of 16 — lost to Wim Ruska (NED)
- Repechage semifinal — lost to Doug Rogers (CAN)

Men's open category

- Tijini Ben Kassou

- Pool A, Round of 32 — bye
- Pool A, Round of 16 — defeated Matthew Folan (IRL)
- Pool B, Quarterfinal — lost to Jean-Claude Brondani (FRA)
- Repechage semifinal — lost to Doug Rogers (CAN)

=== Wrestling ===
Men's Greco-Roman 52 kg (flyweight)
- Mohamed Karmous — eliminated

Men's Greco-Roman 57 kg (bantamweight)
- Ali Lachkar — eliminated

Men's Greco-Roman 68 kg (lightweight)

- Mohamed Bahamou — eliminated
