= 1996 African Judo Championships =

Judo competition

1996 Judo African Judo Championships
- Venue: South Africa
- Location: South Africa
- Date: 1996

Competition at external databases
- Links: JudoInside

The 1996 African Judo Championships took place from 16 to 19 May 1996, in South Africa.

== Results ==
=== Men ===
Event	Gold	Silver	Bronze
–60 kg	Makrem Ayed; Tunisia	Abdelkarim Rouibbet; Algeria	Abdeluahed Idrisi Chorfi; Morocco; Rodrigue Ossandza; Zaire
–65 kg	Abdoulkarim Seck; Senegal	Duncan Mackinnon; South Africa	Clovis Tanoh Aka; Ivory Coast; Amar Meridya; Algeria
–71 kg	Abdelhakim Harkat; Algeria	David Kouassi; Ivory Coast	Abdelatif Zauia; Morocco; Grant Speirs; South Africa
–78 kg	Adil Belgaid; Morocco	El-Sayed Abumedan; Egypt	Jean-Jacques Rakotomalala; Madagascar; Lofti Isaui; Tunisia
–86 kg	Yasin Silimi; Algeria	Iskander Hachicha; Tunisia	Moussa Sall; Senegal; Jean-Claude Raphael; Mauritius
–95 kg	Basel El-Garbawi; Egypt	Jurgen Bence; South Africa	Antonio Felicité; Mauritius; Hasan Ait Sebah; Morocco
+95 kg	Kamel Larbi; Algeria	Khalifa Diouf; Senegal	Slim Agrebi; Tunisia; Ian Guestyn; South Africa
Openweight	Slim Agrebi; Tunisia	Adil Belgaid; Morocco	Basel El-Garbawi; Egypt; Khalifa Diouf; Senegal

=== Women ===
Event	Gold	Silver	Bronze
–48 kg	Salima Suakri; Algeria	Dolly Moothoo; Mauritius	Tania D'Aguiar; South Africa; Soleil Rasoafaniry; Madagascar
–52 kg	Lynda Mekzin; Algeria	Dalenda Hamdi; Tunisia	Liezl Downing; South Africa; Naina Ravaoarisoa; Madagascar
–56 kg	Rauda Chaari; Tunisia	Glorieuse Guillaume; Mauritius	Munia Islan; Morocco; Domoina Rabeantoandro; Madagascar
–61 kg	Maaua Etumi; Morocco	Henriette Moller; South Africa	Hayer Tbesi; Tunisia; Priscilla Chery; Mauritius
–66 kg	Lea Zahoui Blavo; Ivory Coast	Nesria Traki; Tunisia	Sally Buckton; South Africa; Fatima El-Miftah; Morocco
–72 kg	Lorinda Bence; South Africa	Nura Hasan; Egypt	Rkia Ami; Morocco; Marie Michele St. Louis; Mauritius
+72 kg	Marguerita Goua Lou; Ivory Coast	Heba Hefny; Egypt	Adja Marieme Diop; Senegal; Sonia Gorbel; Tunisia
Openweight	Sonia Gorbel; Tunisia	Heba Hefny; Egypt	Adja Marieme Diop; Senegal; Marguerita Goua Lou; Ivory Coast

=== Medal table ===
Rank	Nation	Gold	Silver	Bronze	Total
1	Algeria (ALG)	5	1	1	7
2	Tunisia (TUN)	4	3	4	11
3	Morocco (MAR)	2	1	6	9
4	Ivory Coast (CIV)	2	1	2	5
5	Egypt (EGY)	1	4	1	6
6	South Africa (RSA)	1	3	5	9
7	Senegal (SEN)	1	1	4	6
8	Mauritius (MRI)	0	2	4	6
9	Madagascar (MAD)	0	0	4	4
10	Zaire (ZAI)	0	0	1	1
Totals (10 entries)		16	16	32	64
