= Algeria national judo team =

Algeria judo team

The Algeria national judo team represents Algeria at the international judo competitions at the Olympic Games or World Judo Championships. It is assembled by the Algerian Judo Federation.

== Medal count ==
Competition	Medal table				
Competition	1st place, gold medalist(s)	2nd place, silver medalist(s)	3rd place, bronze medalist(s)	Tot.	Rank
Summer Olympics	0	1	1	2	42
Summer Paralympics	5	0	6	11	8
World Championships	0	1	1	2	58
Summer World University	0	1	2	3	36
Mediterranean Games	7	8	27	42	7
African Games	53	24	38	115	1
African Championships (2001–2026)	121	94	105	320	1
Total	186	129	180	495	−

== List of medalists at Olympic Games ==
Medal	Name	Games	Event	Date
Bronze	Soraya Haddad	2008 Beijing	Women's -52 kg	10 August 2008
Silver	Amar Benikhlef	2008 Beijing	Men's -90 kg	13 August 2008

== List of medalists at Paralympic Games ==
Medal	Name	Games	Event	Date
Gold	Messaoud Nine	2004 Athens	Men's Middleweight 90kg	20 September 2004
Gold	Mouloud Noura	2008 Beijing	Men -60 kg	7 September 2008
Gold	Sid Ali Lamri	2008 Beijing	Men -66 kg	7 September 2008
Bronze	Zoubida Bouazoug	2008 Beijing	Women's +70 kg	9 September 2008
Bronze	Mouloud Noura	2012 London	Men's 60 kg	30 August 2012
Bronze	Sid Ali Lamri	2012 London	Men's 66 kg	30 August 2012
Bronze	Zoubida Bouazoug	2012 London	Women's +70 kg	1 September 2012
Bronze	Cherine Abdellaoui	2016 Rio de Janeiro	Women's 52 kg	8 September 2016
Gold	Cherine Abdellaoui	2020 Tokyo	Women's 52 kg	27 August 2021
Gold	Abdelkader Bouamer	2024 Paris	Men's 60 kg J1	5 September 2024
Bronze	Ishak Ouldkouider	2024 Paris	Men's 60 kg J2	5 September 2024

== List of medalists at World Championships ==
Medal	Name	Games	Event	Date
Silver	Abderahmane Benamadi	(Egypt) 2005 Cairo	Men's Half-middleweight	
Bronze	Soraya Haddad	(Egypt) 2005 Cairo	Women's Extra-lightweight	

== List of medalists at Summer Universiade ==
Medal	Name	Games	Event
Bronze	Meriem Moussa	2007 Bangkok, Thailand.	Women's Extra-lightweight (48 kg)
Bronze	Meriem Moussa	2011 Shenzhen, China	Women's Half-lightweight (−52 kg)
Silver	Amina Belkadi	(Chinese Taipei) 2017 Taipei	Women's Welterweight (−63 kg)

== List of medalists at Mediterranean Games ==
Medal	Name	Games	Event
Bronze	Benabdallah	1975 Algiers, Algeria	Men's 100 kg
Bronze	Ahmed Moussa	(Socialist Federal Republic of Yugoslavia) 1979 Split, Yugoslavia	Men's 60 kg
Bronze	Ahmed Moussa	1983 Casablanca, Morocco	Men's 60 kg
Gold	Meziane Dahmani	1987 Latakia, Syria	Men's 65 kg
Bronze	Abdelhakim Harkat	1987 Latakia, Syria	Men's 60 kg
Gold	Abdelhakim Harkat	1991 Athens, Greece	Men's 65 kg
Bronze	Ali Idir	1991 Athens, Greece	Men's 60 kg
Bronze	Meziane Dahmani	1991 Athens, Greece	Men's 71 kg
Gold	Abdelhakim Harkat	1993 Perpignan, France	Men's 65 kg
Bronze	Fayçal Bousbiat	1993 Perpignan, France	Men's 60 kg
Bronze	Meziane Dahmani	1993 Perpignan, France	Men's 71 kg
Silver	Amar Meridja	1997 Bari, Italy	Men's 65 kg
Silver	Salima Souakri	1997 Bari, Italy	Women's 52 kg
Bronze	Lynda Mekzine	1997 Bari, Italy	Women's 56 kg
Gold	Salima Souakri	2001 Tunis, Tunisia	Women's 52 kg
Silver	Salim Boutabcha	2001 Tunis, Tunisia	Men's 81 kg
Silver	Mohammed Bouaichaoui	2001 Tunis, Tunisia	Men's +100 kg
Silver	Khaled Meddah	2001 Tunis, Tunisia	Men's 90 kg
Silver	Rachida Ouardane	2001 Tunis, Tunisia	Women's 70 kg
Bronze	Amar Meridja	2001 Tunis, Tunisia	Men's 66 kg
Bronze	Noureddine Yagoubi	2001 Tunis, Tunisia	Men's 73 kg
Bronze	Lynda Mekzine	2001 Tunis, Tunisia	Women's 57 kg
Bronze	Zoubida Bouyacoub	2001 Tunis, Tunisia	Women's 63 kg
Gold	Omar Rebahi	2005 Almería, Spain	Men's 60 kg
Gold	Soraya Haddad	2005 Almería, Spain	Women's 48 kg
Bronze	Noureddine Yagoubi	2005 Almería, Spain	Men's 73 kg
Bronze	Abderahmane Benamadi	2005 Almería, Spain	Men's 81 kg
Bronze	Lynda Mekzine	2005 Almería, Spain	Women's 52 kg
Bronze	Lyes Bouyacoub	2009 Pescara, Italy	Men's 90 kg
Bronze	Amar Benikhlef	2009 Pescara, Italy	Men's 100 kg
Bronze	Lila Latrous	2009 Pescara, Italy	Women's 57 kg
Bronze	Kahina Saidi	2009 Pescara, Italy	Women's 63 kg
Bronze	Rachida Ouerdane	2009 Pescara, Italy	Women's 78 kg
Bronze	Abderahmane Benamadi	2013 Mersin, Turkey	Men's 90 kg
Bronze	Bilal Zouani	2013 Mersin, Turkey	Men's +100 kg
Bronze	Kaouther Ouallal	2013 Mersin, Turkey	Women's 78 kg
Bronze	Lyès Bouyacoub	2018 Tarragona, Spain	Men's 100 kg
Bronze	Sonia Asselah	2018 Tarragona, Spain	Women's +78 kg
Gold	Messaoud Dris	2022 Oran, Algeria	Men's 73 kg
Silver	Mustapha Bouamar	2022 Oran, Algeria	Men's 100 kg
Silver	Mohamed Sofiane Belrekaa	2022 Oran, Algeria	Men's +100 kg
Bronze	Amina Belkadi	2022 Oran, Algeria	Women's 63 kg

== See also ==
- Algeria at the Olympics
