= Gröben (surname) =

People with the German surname von der Groeben include:

- Alexander von der Groeben (born 1955), former athlete and journalist
- Friedrich von der Groeben (1645–1712), Officer
- Hans von der Groeben (1907–2005), diplomat
- Karl von der Gröben (1788–1876), general
- Otto Friedrich von der Groeben (1657–1728), general
- Ulrike von der Groeben (born 1957), journalist
