= Judo at the 1972 Summer Olympics – Men's +93 kg =

Judo competition

Men's +93kg at the Games of the XX Olympiad
- Venue: Judo and Wrestling Hall
- Date: 31 August 1972
- Competitors: 21 from 21 nations

Medalists
1st place, gold medalist(s)		Wim Ruska	Netherlands
2nd place, silver medalist(s)		Klaus Glahn	West Germany
3rd place, bronze medalist(s)		Motoki Nishimura	Japan
3rd place, bronze medalist(s)		Givi Onashvili	Soviet Union

Men's +93 kg competition in judo at the 1972 Summer Olympics in Munich, West Germany was held at Judo and Wrestling Hall.

== Results ==
=== Finals ===
Semi-finals
Klaus Glahn (FRG)	2:32
Givi Onashvili (URS)	3rd place, bronze medalist(s)
Wim Ruska (NED)	8:00
Motoki Nishimura (JPN)	3rd place, bronze medalist(s)

Final
Wim Ruska (NED)	1:43 (gold)
Klaus Glahn (FRG)	2nd place, silver medalist(s)

=== Repechages ===
Repechage semifinal		Repechage final
M’Bagnik M’Bodj (SEN)	E
Motoki Nishimura (JPN)	1:57	Jean-Claude Brondani (FRA)	E
		Motoki Nishimura (JPN)	6:00

Repechage semifinal		Repechage final
Tijine Ben Kassou (MAR)	E
Douglas Nelson (USA)	6:00	Klaus Glahn (FRG)	2:14
		Douglas Nelson (USA)	E

=== Pool A ===
Round of 32
Keith Remfry (GBR)	E
Douglas Rogers (CAN)	6:00
Erich Butka (AUT)	0:00
BYE
Mihály Petrovszky (HUN)	E
Jean-Claude Brondani (FRA)	4:30
Matthew Folan (IRL)	0:00
BYE
M'Bagnick M'Bodj (SEN)	R
Givi Onashvili (URS)	0:22
Waldemar Sikorski (POL)	0:00
BYE
Motoki Nishimura (JPN)	0:00
BYE
Pierre Paris (SUI)	0:00
BYE

Round of 16
Douglas Rogers (CAN)	6:00
Erich Butka (AUT)	E
Jean-Claude Brondani (FRA)	2:18
Matthew Folan (IRL)	E
Givi Onashvili (URS)	0:00
DNS
Motoki Nishimura (JPN)	1:04
Pierre Paris (SUI)	E

Quarterfinal
Douglas Rogers (CAN)	E
Jean-Claude Brondani (FRA)	1:42
Givi Onashvili (URS)	6:00
Motoki Nishimura (JPN)	R

Semifinal
Jean-Claude Brondani (FRA)	R
Givi Onashvili (URS)	5:16

=== Pool B ===
Round of 32
Klaus Glahn (FRG)	0:54
Tommy Andrianatvoo (MAD)	E
Santiago Ojeda (ESP)	0:00
BYE
Leslie MacPhail (BEL)	0:00
BYE
Klaus Hennig (GDR)	0:00
BYE
Püreviin Dagvasüren (MGL)	E
Tijine Ben Kassou (MAR)	6:00
Wim Ruska (NED)	0:00
BYE
Douglas Nelson (USA)	0:00
BYE
Nicola Tempesta (ITA)	0:00
BYE

Round of 16
Klaus Glahn (FRG)	5:02
Santiago Ojeda Perez (ESP)	E
Leslie MacPhail (BEL)	E
Klaus Hennig (GDR)	5:28
Tijine Ben Kassou (MAR)	R
Wim Ruska (NED)	0:29
Douglas Nelson (USA)	0:00
Nicola Tempesta (ITA)	DNS E

Quarterfinal
Klaus Glahn (FRG)	6:00
Klaus Hennig (GDR)	E
Wim Ruska (NED)	1:21
Douglas Nelson (USA)	R

Semifinal
Klaus Glahn (FRG)	R
Wim Ruska (NED)	6:00
