= Groeben family =

German aristocrat family

Coat of arms of the von der Groeben family

The Groeben family (also Gröben or von der Groeben) is the name of an old German noble family, originating in the Altmark region. The lords von der Groeben belonged to the nobility of the Archbishopric of Magdeburg, and moved from there to the Margraviate of Brandenburg, then to East Prussia. Members of the family held the title of Count in Prussia, granted to them on 19 September 1786 by King Frederick William II. Various branches still exist today.

The Genealogisches Handbuch des Adels mentions another family of the same name, whose ancestor was Hans Gottlob Greben (1724-1777), a lieutenant under the Kingdom of Poland, the Electorate of Saxony and the Kingdom of Prussia. His son Friedrich Wilhelm (1774-1839) was a Prussian lieutenant general, and he and his descendants used the name and coat of arms of von der Groeben without objection.

== History ==
=== Origins ===
The first known mention of the family is from records dated to 29 November 1140 with Luiderus de Grebene. Gribehne (also Grubene, Grobene, Cyprene, Grebene or Gröben), the probable ancestral seat, is an abandoned village near Calbe in the Salzlandkreis in Saxony-Anhalt.

It is rumoured that the family originally came from the Duchy of Saxony. Family members possibly came to Brandenburg in 927 with King Henry. There are also said to the 12 old Saxonian noble families who elected from amongst themselves the Vierherren of the Kingdom.

The origins of the name Groeben are not known. Possibly it comes from the Slavic Grob'n meaning trench, grave or dam. In this case the land-owning family von Gröben would have taken the name of its possession, the village of Gröben, as was the usual practice.

== Notable members ==
- Alexander von der Groeben (born 1955), German judoka and sports reporter
- Arthur von der Groeben (1850-1930), Prussian General of the Infantry
- Carolin von der Groeben (born 1995), German actress and voiceover artist
- Chlotilde von der Groeben (1887-1983), private teacher at the court of the Tsar
- Ernst Ludwig von der Gröben (1703–1773), chamber president of the Kurmark, lord at Löwenbruch, gave his name to the city of Ludwigsfelde
- Friedrich von der Groeben (1645-1712), Prussian aristocrat and commander of the Foreign Legion of King John III Sobieski in the Battle of Vienna
- Friedrich Gottfried Graf von der Groeben (1726–1799), Prussian minister
- Georg Dietrich von der Groeben (1725–1794), Prussian lieutenant general, military writer and head of the military department in the Directorate-General
- Georg Reinhold von der Groeben (1817-1894), Prussian General of the Cavalry
- Günther Wilhelm Karl Graf von der Groeben (1832–1900), Prussian lieutenant general
- Hans von der Groeben (1907–2005), German diplomat and publisher
- Harald Graf von der Groeben (1856-1926), Prussian lieutenant general
- Heinrich Wilhelm von der Groeben (1657–1729)
- Hermann Friedrich von der Groeben (1828–1902), German major general
- Ida von der Groeben (1791–1868), Pietist, author
- Karl von der Gröben (1788–1876), Prussian General of the Cavalry
- Karl Ernst August von der Gröben (1750–1809), German major general
- Karl Hermann von der Groeben (1826–1898), German major general
- Karl Konrad von der Groeben (1918–2005), entrepreneur, philanthropist
- Klaus von der Groeben (1902–2002), German administrative lawyer
- Konrad Heinrich von der Groeben (1683–1746), Prussian major general
- Ludwig von der Groeben (1579–1620)
- Max von der Groeben (born 1992), actor and voiceover artist
- Otto Friedrich von der Groeben (1657–1728), Brandenburg scientist and traveler
- Peter von der Groeben (1903–2002), German major general
- Selma Gräfin von der Gröben
- Ulrike von der Groeben (born 1957), German television presenter
- Wolfgang von der Groeben (born 1937), administrative lawyer
