= Razafimahatratra =

Razafimahatratra is a Malagasy surname. Notable people with this surname include:

- Jean de Dieu Razafimahatratra (born 1947), Malagasy judoka
- Josoa Razafimahatratra (born 1980), Malagasy football midfielder
- Victor Razafimahatratra, SJ (1921–1993), Malagasy Cardinal of the Roman Catholic Church
- Zarah Razafimahatratra (born 1994), Malagasy tennis player
