= Medieval (film) =

2022 Czech historical drama film

- English poster
- Czech: Jan Žižka
- Directed by: Petr Jákl
- Screenplay by: Petr Jákl
- Story by: Petr Jákl Sr.
- Produced by: Cassian Elwes
- Starring: Ben Foster; Michael Caine; Til Schweiger; William Moseley; Matthew Goode; Sophie Lowe
- Cinematography: Jesper Tøffner
- Edited by: Steven Rosenblum
- Music by: Philip Klein
- Production company: WOG FILM s.r.o.
- Distributed by: Bioscop
- Release date: September 8, 2022
- Running time: 125 minutes
- Country: Czech Republic
- Language: English
- Budget: KČ500 million ($20.3 million)
- Box office: $4.4 million Czech Republic: KČ 50.6 million United States: $1.4 million

Medieval (Jan Žižka or Warrior of God) is a 2022 English-language Czech historical drama film directed by Petr Jákl. It is about the life of Jan Žižka, a Bohemian military commander who never lost a battle. The film is set prior to the Hussite Wars (1419–1434), when Žižka was young. It tells the story of how Žižka became a famous military commander. With a budget of KČ500 million ($20.3 million), it is the most expensive Czech film ever made. The film was released on September 8, 2022.

== Plot ==
In the 14th century, Wenceslaus IV from the House of Luxembourg is the king of Bohemia, King of Germany and Emperor of the Holy Roman Empire at the same time. Wenceslaus has received the throne after his father Charles IV, but his reign is not as successful, and he has built up a debt and the kingdom seems to fall apart under his weak rule.

The country is actually ruled by Henry III of Rosenberg, the most powerful nobleman in the country. The film follows Jan Žižka, a knight, mercenary, and future leader of the Hussite army who leads a mercenary group. His outfit consists of ex-nobles, knights, cutthroats, and former thugs now fighting for Groschen. His mercenary outfit consists of German veteran knight Ulrich, greedy soldier Conrad, archer Freddy, Norse berserker Lars, spearman Cyril, and his most senior member, Italian knight Giovanni.

After saving Lord Boresh from brigands at the cost of losing one of his men in the fight, Žižka recruits the only surviving brigand, Mick, to his outfit and escorted Boresh to Prague where there was a debate on getting Wenceslaus to Rome for his coronation. After failing to gain Rosenberg's support, while aware it was him that hired Boresh's attackers, Jan is tasked to kidnap Rosenberg's fiancée Katherine which would force Rosenberg to keep his word and help Wenceslas to be crowned the emperor of the Holy Roman Empire.

Jan then returns to his childhood home to see his brother, Jaroslav and his nephew where he learned that they're aiding the rebels while providing them coin from his mercenary work. This gets Žižka involved with high politics as he and his men set their plan in motion by capturing Katherine at the Cathedral and smuggling her out on a cart full of cadavers. Žižka is now not only facing conflict with Rosenberg, but also with Wenceslaus' half-brother King Sigismund, who learn that Wenceslaus and Boresh orchestrated the abduction. They then send soldiers, Cumans led by Žižka's mentor Torak, and Rosenberg's personal guard, led by Captain Martin, to recapture Katherine.

Torak and his Cumans pillaged Žižka's home village of Trocnov, torched his home, tortured his nephew and put him through a wooden spike, and kidnapped his brother Jaroslav to swap him for Katherine. Žižka killed his nephew to spare him further torment. One of the rebels, Barbara, was spared during the attack to warn Žižka, and later agrees to accompany Žižka and his mercenary outfit to the rebel camp where they train the rebels in combat. Katherine attempts to escape only for Jan and his men to catch her again. Torak and Martin engage in a hostage swap with Žižka, and Jaroslav blamed Jan for his son's death. Torak then sets up a trap in the mountain pass, but Žižka, aware of Torak's strategies, used the help of the rebels and great tactics to defeat Torak's men and recapture Katherine despite being outnumbered.

Žižka and his men manage to escape with Jaroslav and Katherine, however, Giovanni was mortally wounded during the fight and died. They hid in a nearby cave but are ambushed by Torak and Martin and Žižka barely escapes losing his eye in a fight. The group splits up, during which Cyril was wounded by Torak while covering Žižka's escape and dies of his wounds. Katherine nurses Jan from his injury while Jan has fervent memories of his late friend, Anna. Katherine is then retaken by Torak's lieutenant, Ajdar, who is then killed and decapitated by Žižka. Torak is searching for Žižka while terrorizing local peasants and finds Ajdar's head impaled on a tree. Rosenberg and his personal guard soon close in on Žižka and Katherine. Jan is willing to free Katherine, but after witnessing Rosenberg's cruelty first-hand, Katherine decides against returning to him. They discovered Captain Martin and his men preparing to hang David, a young rebel in front of the peasants, and when Katherine attempted to intervene, Jan attacked the soldiers, but was beaten down due to the overwhelming numbers. Katherine kills Martin and the village peasants trample his men. Tovak appears at the village along with his men and Conrad, who betrayed Žižka's outfit and made a deal with Tovak, to discover the massacre. Conrad is shot and killed for his betrayal by Freddy.

Žižka reunites with his men and the rebels agree to help escort Katherine to Wenceslaus's hunting castle, but Jan decided against it and chose to return Katherine to her father in France, however, his men refused to make the trek as they incapacitated and tied up Žižka and kidnapped Katherine who meanwhile had fallen in love with Žižka. Jan is freed by David and brought to a mortally wounded Boresh, who revealed that Sigismund kidnapped King Wenceslas and taken the castle. As he dies he notes that the world can't be changed for the better if kings can do such things.

Aware that his men are walking into a trap, Žižka decides to rally the peasants to save Katherine and reaches the castle. Katherine is taken to Wenceslaus's hunting castle and Žižka's men are immediately ambushed by Tovak's soldiers. Žižka's men are killed and Jan utilized Wenceslaus's pet lion to cover their flight.

Žižka soon faces off against Torak, while the peasants and his men clash. During the fight, Jaroslav is knocked over the castle wall and rolls into the river but survives. Torak gains the upper hand and gives Žižka an ultimatum to join him or die but Katherine throws herself off the castle wall to the river to save Žižka. Jan jumps after her while pulling Torak with him. He bashes Torak's head to death with a rock while underwater and brings Katherine to the riverbank. She gives him her ring after they kiss and she dies. Žižka brings her body to the rebels.

An epilogue states that Sigismund became king of Bohemia after his brother's death but the people revolted against him. Sigismund, declaring them heretics, orchestrated crusades to Bohemia while Žižka led the outnumbered peasants. The film ends during the Hussite Wars with Žižka leading a Hussite army in a wagon fort facing a large army. It is shown that he is still keeping Katherine's ring. Žižka was described as one of the greatest military tacticians of all time and never lost a fight. The film was dedicated to those who fight for freedom.

== Cast ==
- Ben Foster as Jan Žižka, a Bohemian mercenary leader hired to kidnap a noblewoman and later lead the Hussites against Sigismund
- Michael Caine as Lord Boresh, an aging Bohemian nobleman who hired Žižka and his outfit to kidnap Katherine
- Til Schweiger as Rosenberg, a corrupt nobleman in league with Sigismund and Burgrave of Bohemia
- William Moseley as Jaroslav Žižka, Jan Žižka's brother
- Matthew Goode as King Sigismund, ruthless king of Hungary, emperor of the Holy Roman Empire, and Wenceslaus's half-brother
- Sophie Lowe as Katherine, a French noblewoman betrothed to Rosenberg and niece of the King of France
- Karel Roden as King Wenceslas, eldest son of Charles IV and idle king of Bohemia
- Roland Møller as Torak, Žižka's ruthless mentor who commands Sigismund's Cumans
- Werner Daehn as Ulrich, a veteran German knight in Žižka's outfit
- Vinzenz Kiefer as Conrad, a greedy soldier in Žižka's outfit
- Alistair Brammer as Freddy, an archer in Žižka's outfit
- Magnus Samuelsson as Lars, a Norse berserker in Žižka outfit
- Christopher Rygh as Mick, a brigand leader who attempted to kill Boresh but was ultimately recruited into Žižka's outfit
- Guy Roberts as Cyril, a spear-wielding warrior in Žižka's outfit
- David Bowles as Giovanni, an Italian knight and the oldest mercenary in Žižka's outfit
- Jennifer Armour as Barbara, a Bohemian Rebel and Jaroslav's lover
- Kevin Bernhardt as Captain Martin, Rosenberg's bodyguard who commands his personal guard
- Jan Budař as Matthew, a Bohemian Rebel leader
- Ondřej Vetchý as Ondřej
- Romana Jákl Vítová as Theresa
- Ben Cristovao as Adjar, a Cuman lieutenant under Torak's command
- Sean Connor Renwick as David, a young Bohemian rebel
- William Lizr as Nephew
- Václav Jiráček as Zdenĕk
- Marek Vašut as Wenceslas' chamberlain
- Viktor Krištof as Jan Hus
- James Beaumont as Voice of Jan Hus
- Daniel Vávra as villager

== Production ==
In 2013, Petr Jákl announced that he was preparing to make a film about Jan Žižka. He estimated a possible budget of 85 million Czech koruna. During 2014, it was scheduled for a 2016 release. Work on the film started after Jákl finished Ghoul in 2015. American agency William Morris Endeavor has assisted with recruitment of actors for the film. Jákl stated that Žižka would most likely be played by a foreign actor.

In August 2016, the process of recruiting extras for battles was started. The first round of recruitment concluded in January 2017, with thousands of volunteers.

In July 2017, Jákl announced that shooting would start in Spring 2018, and that it would take place in South Bohemia and Central Bohemia. He also stated that Žižka would definitely not be played by a Czech actor, saying that his USA contacts were talking with the agents of some American actors. Cassian Elwes became the film's producer on 6 March 2018.

Ben Foster was announced to be cast as Jan Žižka on 24 August 2018. Shooting was scheduled to start on 17 September 2018. Michael Caine was announced on 7 September 2018 to be cast as the fictional character of Lord Boreš. Matthew Goode was cast in November as King Sigismund.

The film was officially announced on 13 September 2018. The main cast included Til Schweiger, Marek Vašut, and Sophie Lowe, among others. The final budget was announced as 500,000,000 CZK (23,000,000 USD). Shooting started on 17 September 2018, continuing near Prague until October 2018. Shooting then moved to various Czech castles such as Křivoklát Castle before concluding in December 2018. Shooting took place primarily in Central Bohemia and South Bohemia.

=== Themes and inspirations ===
The film is based on the youth of the famous Hussite commander Jan Žižka, one of the most successful military leaders of his time, who had never lost a battle. Director Petr Jákl (who had been known to film audience especially thanks to the popular thriller Kajínek about a well-known Czech prison escapee) said he wanted to promote Czech Republic in the world and so this time he chose one of the biggest Czech national heroes as the main character for his film. Unlike other auteurs, he chose the early period of Žižka's life because he wanted the audience to see how his character was formed. At the same time it allowed him to make the film different from his predecessors (for example a well-known 1955 film Jan Žižka by Otakar Vávra) which focused on his glorious Hussite period. Jákl admitted that although he tried to be faithful to the facts, cooperating with the Czech historian Jaroslav Čechura, he did not consider them as important as the overall impression, especially as many facts of Žižka's early life are not known at all or are a matter of dispute among historians. Thus also a love story was added.

== Release ==
The film had its premiere on 5 September 2022 in Slovanský dům. It was attended by members of film cast and production such as Til Schweiger, Sophie Lowe and Petr Jákl. Michael Caine sent a video greeting. The film was released into cinemas on 8 September 2022.

=== Home media and streaming ===
The film was released for digital and streaming release on 31 October 2022. On 9 November 2022 the film was released on Netflix.

Paramount Home Entertainment acquired the home video distribution rights to the film, set for release on Blu-ray around December 6, 2022.

== Reception ==
On the review aggregator website Rotten Tomatoes, the film holds an approval rating of 38% based on 34 reviews, with average rating 5/10. The website's consensus reads, "Some solid set pieces aren't enough to compensate for Medieval's thin and often incomprehensible plot." Metacritic assigned the film a weighted average score of 46 out of 100, based on 13 critics, indicating "mixed or average reviews". The film has a score of 58% based on 12 reviews on Czech website Kinobox.cz.

=== Box office ===
The film opened in the Czech Republic with 114,244 spectators during previews and 104,921 spectators during first weekend. It grossed 18,825,068 Kč as a result. It is the fourth best opening of the year.

In the United States the film grossed $821,991 from 1,311 cinemas, finishing 14th.

== MEDIEVAL video game ==
In addition to the 2022 film, an indie video game titled MEDIEVAL is in development by Slovak studio Cypronia. The third-person action-adventure game is inspired by the film's portrayal of the early life of the Bohemian military leader Jan Žižka and is set in the Kingdom of Bohemia in the early 15th century.

The project entered a crowdfunding campaign in early 2026 to finance features such as a Czech language dubbing, achieving its initial funding goals within hours of launch. During the campaign, the developers also released the first official in-game screenshots showcasing environments and character designs. The developers have stated that the game will expand on the film's narrative with additional scenes and gameplay content.

MEDIEVAL is planned for release in late 2026 on PC via Steam, with subsequent launches on PlayStation 5 and Xbox Series. Most of the film's cast and contributors are reported to be publicly supportive of the project, and some voice talent associated with the movie may appear in the game's localization. The game will also feature in-game performances by Michael Caine.

== Other related projects ==
A board game titled Medieval: Jan Žižka was released following the film, based on the movie's setting and characters and allowing players to experience medieval strategy in tabletop form.

A companion book and an augmented reality app called Jan Zizka kniha were also released, letting users explore the film's story and see scanned key items for interactive content.

A mobile game by More.is.More, announced as Medieval AR, was released as Medieval: Uprising. It is a location-based game in which the player takes the role of a Hussite commander travelling a war-ravaged landscape. Players make decisions in encounters with NPCs, visit real-world locations such as churches and smithies to boost their units, and collect and train units as cards in a deck-building system. Battles are played on a chessboard-style grid. An open alpha was released in August 2024 and is available on iOS and Android.

== See also ==
- Jan Žižka (1955 film)
- List of most expensive Czech films
