= Judo at the 1984 Summer Olympics – Men's +95 kg =

Judo at the Olympics

Men's +95 kg at the Games of the XXIII Olympiad
- Venue: California State University, Los Angeles
- Date: 10 August 1984
- Competitors: 16 from 16 nations

Medalists
1st place, gold medalist(s)		Hitoshi Saito	Japan
2nd place, silver medalist(s)		Angelo Parisi	France
3rd place, bronze medalist(s)		Mark Berger	Canada
3rd place, bronze medalist(s)		Cho Yong-chul	South Korea

The men's +95 kg competition in judo at the 1984 Summer Olympics in Los Angeles was held on 10 August at the California State University. The gold medal was won by Hitoshi Saito of Japan.

== Results ==
=== Pool A ===
Round of 16		Quarterfinal		Semifinal
Ricardo Andersen (ARG)	E
Doug Nelson (USA)	WIP	Doug Nelson (USA)	YUK
Frederico Flexa (BRA)	E	Alexander von der Groeben (FRG)	E
Alexander von der Groeben (FRG)	IPO			Doug Nelson (USA)	R
Elvis Gordon (GBR)	E			Angelo Parisi (FRA)	YUK
Cho Yong-chul (KOR)	WAZ	Cho Yong-chul (KOR)	R
Angelo Parisi (FRA)	IPO	Angelo Parisi (FRA)	WIP
Sherif El-Digwy (EGY)	R

=== Pool B ===
Round of 16		Quarterfinal		Semifinal
Desiderio Lebron (DOM)	E
Khalif Diouf (SEN)	YUK	Khalif Diouf (SEN)	E
Radomir Kovacevic (YUG)	YUS	Radomir Kovacevic (YUG)	IPO
Willy Wilhelm (NED)	E			Radomir Kovacevic (YUG)	R
Fernando Ferreyros (PER)	E			Hitoshi Saito (JPN)	IPO
Isidore Silas (CMR)	IPO	Isidore Silas (CMR)	R
Hitoshi Saito (JPN)	IPO	Hitoshi Saito (JPN)	IPO
Mark Berger (CAN)	R

=== Repechages ===
Repechage	Repechage semifinal		Repechage final
	Sherif El-Digwy (EGY)	E
	Cho Yong-chul (KOR)	IPO
			Cho Yong-chul (KOR)	YUK (bronze)
			Doug Nelson (USA)	E

Repechage	Repechage semifinal		Repechage final
	Mark Berger (CAN)	IPO
	Isidore Silas (CMR)	E
			Mark Berger (CAN)	IPO (bronze)
			Radomir Kovacevic (YUG)	E

=== Final ===
Final
Angelo Parisi (FRA)	2nd place, silver medalist(s)
Hitoshi Saito (JPN)	KOK (gold)

== Final classification ==
Rank	Judoka	Nation
1st place, gold medalist(s)	Hitoshi Saito	Japan
2nd place, silver medalist(s)	Angelo Parisi	France
3rd place, bronze medalist(s)	Mark Berger	Canada
3rd place, bronze medalist(s)	Cho Yong-chul	South Korea
5T	Radomir Kovacevic	Yugoslavia
5T	Doug Nelson	United States
7T	Sherif El-Digwy	Egypt
7T	Isidore Silas	Cameroon
9T	Alexander von der Groeben	West Germany
9T	Khalif Diouf	Senegal
11T	Desiderio Lebron	Dominican Republic
11T	Willy Wilhelm	Netherlands
11T	Fernando Ferreyros	Peru
11T	Ricardo Andersen	Argentina
11T	Frederico Flexa	Brazil
11T	Elvis Gordon	Great Britain
