= Jennifer Armour =

American actress (born 1985)

- Born: August 27, 1985 (age 40); Minneapolis, Minnesota, U.S.
- Education: Boston University (BFA)
- Occupation: Actress
- Years active: 2002–present
- Spouse: James Dutton (m. 2016)

Jennifer Armour (born August 27, 1985) is an American actress and voice artist. She is known for appearing in Ghoul and Medieval directed by Petr Jákl. In 2022, she played Wendy Blissett in the long-running British soap opera Hollyoaks.

== Filmography ==
Film
Year	Title	Role	Notes
2015	Ghoul	Jenny Matthews	Grossman Fantastic Film and Wine Festival Winner, Best Movie
2018	Roma	Leslie Matos	
2019	Yesterday	Investigative Journalist	
2022	Medieval	Barbara	
2023	Havoc	Patrol Cop	

Television
Year	Title	Role	Notes
2002	The West Wing	Friend	Episode: "20 Hours in America: Part I"
2009	Rescue Me	Girl	Episode: "Mickey"
2014	24: Live Another Day	Hostage	Episodes: "2:00pm-3:00pm" and "3:00pm - 4:00pm"
2015	Obsession Dark Desires	Kim Springer	Episode: "Going Postal"
2017	Home Alone	Erin	Episode: "Bullets in the Basement"
2018	Mars	American Reporter	Episode: "The Shake Up"
2018	Genius: Picasso	Socialite 2	Episode: "Picasso: Chapter 10"
2019	Chimerica	Laura	Episode: "Kodak Ergo Sum"
2019	Good Omens	Airbase Soldier	Episode: "The Doomsday Option"
2020	Avenue 5	Newscaster 2	Episode: "Wait a Minute, Then Who Was That on the Ladder?"
2020	Homeland	Pentagon Spokesperson	Episode: "In Full Flight"
2022	Toast of Tinsletown	Woman in Coffee Queue	Episode: "Monster Mash"
2022	Hollyoaks	Wendy Blissett	Regular role
2022	The Sandman	Traffic Report Terri	Series 1: Episode 5
2023	The Windsors	Lauren (Netflix)	The Coronation Special
2024	Black Doves	Vanessa	
2024	Lockerbie	Joy Engleman	

=== Video games ===
Year	Title	Role	Notes
2024	Wuthering Waves	Sanhua	Voice
2024	Helldivers II	Female Civilian 4	Voice
2023	Aliens: Dark Descent	Cassandra/ Player Marine F2	Voice
2023	Dead Island 2	Evie/Janet	Voice
2022	Arknights	Scavenger	Voice
2022	Horizon Forbidden West	Colonel Nojah	Voice
2021	Battlefield 2042	US Soldier	Voice
2020	Gears Tactics	Soldier	Voice
2020	Corruption 2029	EOS	Voice
2019	Control	Additional Cast	Voice
2018	Battlefield V	Voice Acting Talent	
2018	Lego The Incredibles	Sally Sundae	Voice
2018	Pillars of Eternity II: Deadfire	Gwenfin, Biha	Voice
2017	Spellforce 3	Ianna The Singer	Voice
2017	Star Wars: Battlefront II	Voice Talent	
2017	Hidden Agenda	Other Voices	
2017	Horizon Zero Dawn	Walla Voices	
2016	Mirror's Edge Catalyst	Aurore Lupain-Tanner	Voice role
2016	Homefront: The Revolution	Jennifer Blue	Voice
2015	Guitar Hero Live	Bass Jephson Hangout	Voice
2015	Soma	Emma Alvaro	Voice
2014	Elite Dangerous	Jade Sanderlyn	Voice
2014	The Crew	Zoe Winters	Voice
2014	Alien: Isolation	Julia Jones	Voice
