= Judo at the 1972 Summer Olympics – Men's 80 kg =

Judo competition

Men's 80kg at the Games of the XX Olympiad
- Venue: Judo and Wrestling Hall
- Date: 2 September 1972
- Competitors: 35 from 35 nations

Medalists
1st place, gold medalist(s)		Shinobu Sekine	Japan
2nd place, silver medalist(s)		Oh Seung-Lip	South Korea
3rd place, bronze medalist(s)		Jean-Paul Coche	France
3rd place, bronze medalist(s)		Brian Jacks	Great Britain

Men's 80 kg competition in judo at the 1972 Summer Olympics in Munich, West Germany was held at Judo and Wrestling Hall.

== Results ==
=== Finals ===
Semi-finals
Shinobu Sekine (JPN)	8:00
Brian Jacks (GBR)	3rd place, bronze medalist(s)
Oh Seung-Lip (KOR)	3:59
Jean-Paul Coche (FRA)	3rd place, bronze medalist(s)

Final
Shinobu Sekine (JPN)	10:00 (gold)
Oh Seung-Lip (KOR)	2nd place, silver medalist(s)

=== Repechages ===
Repechage		Repechage semifinal		Repechage final
Simo Akrenius (FIN)	E
Gerd Egger (FRG)	6:00	Jean-Paul Coche (FRA)	6:00
		Gerd Egger (FRG)	E
				Guram Gogolauri (URS)	E
				Jean-Paul Coche (FRA)	6:00

Repechage		Repechage semifinal		Repechage final
Petr Jákl (TCH)	0:20
Cherdpong Punsoni (THA)	E	Lutz Lischka (AUT)	0:26
		Petr Jákl (TCH)	E
				Lutz Lischka (AUT)	E
				Shinobu Sekine (JPN)	2:32

=== Pool A ===
First round
Guram Gogolauri (URS)	5:55
Jonas Cissé (SEN)	E
Chang Ping-ho (ROC)	1:22
Raymond Coulibaly (MLI)	E

Round of 32
Guram Gogolauri (URS)	3:25
Irwin Cohen (USA)	E
Martin Poglajen (NED)	1:13
Jean de Dieu Razafimahatratra (MAD)	E
Slavko Obadov (YUG)	6:00
Choidoryn Övgönkhüü (MGL)	E
Carlos Socias (DOM)	E
Philip Illingworth (CAN)	0:25
Chang Ping-Ho (ROC)	E
Jean-Paul Coche (FRA)	6:00
Tommy Tegelgård (SWE)	E
Lhofei Shiozawa (BRA)	3:03
Brian Jacks (GBR)	0:46
Simo Akrenius (FIN)	R
Luis Arredondo (MEX)	E
Gerd Egger (FRG)	6:00

Round of 16
Guram Gogolauri (URS)	6:00
Martin Poglajen (NED)	E
Slavko Obadov (YUG)	6:00
Philip Illingworth (CAN)
Jean-Paul Coche (FRA)	6:00
Lhofei Shiozawa (BRA)	E
Brian Jacks (GBR)	6:00
Gerd Egger (FRG)	R

Quarterfinal
Guram Gogolauri (URS)	6:00
Slavko Obadov (YUG)	E
Jean-Paul Coche (FRA)	R
Brian Jacks (GBR)	6:00

Semifinal
Guram Gogolauri (URS)	R
Brian Jacks (GBR)	6:00

=== Pool B ===
First round
Philippe Aubert (SUI)	0:56
Wadih Gosn (LIB)	E

Round of 32
Philippe Aubert (SUI)	6:00
Isaac Azcuy (CUB)	E
Boubker Slimani (MAR)	E
Lutz Lischka (AUT)	2:00
Petr Jákl (TCH)	6:00
Rudolf Hendel (GDR)	E
Cherdpong Punsoni (THA)	R
Oh Seung-Lip (KOR)	2:40
Terry Watt (IRL)	E
Alex Bijkerk (AUS)	6:00
Rick Littlewood (NZL)	2:12
Adam Adamczyk (POL)	E
Antonio Gallina (ARG)	E
László Ipacs (HUN)	6:00
Orlando Ferreira (POR)	E
Shinobu Sekine (JPN)	0:48

Round of 16
Philippe Aubert (SUI)	E
Lutz Lischka (AUT)	6:00
Petr Jákl (TCH)	R
Oh Seung-Lip (KOR)	1:41
Alex Bijkerk (AUS)	E
Rick Littlewood (NZL)	0:49
László Ipacs (HUN)	E
Shinobu Sekine (JPN)	4:46

Quarterfinal
Lutz Lischka (AUT)	R
Oh Seung-Lip (KOR)	4:46
Rick Littlewood (NZL)	E
Shinobu Sekine (JPN)	6:00

Semifinal
Oh Seung-Lip (KOR)	6:00
Shinobu Sekine (JPN)	R
