= Adijat =

Adijat is a given name. Notable people with the name include:

- Adijat Ayuba (born 1983), Nigerian judoka
- Adijat Gbadamosi (born 2001), Nigerian boxer
- Adijat Olarinoye (born 1999), Nigerian weightlifter
