= Shinobu Sekine =

Japanese judoka (1943–2018)

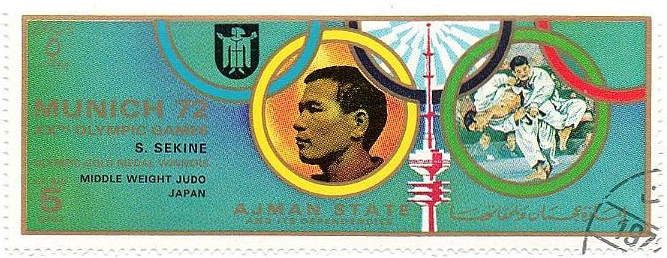
- Sekine on a stamp of Ajman

Personal information
- Born: 20 September 1943 Oarai, Ibaraki, Japan
- Died: 18 December 2018 (aged 75)
- Occupation: Judoka
- Height: 173 cm (5 ft 8 in)

Sport
- Country: Japan
- Sport: Judo
- Weight class: ‍–‍80 kg, Open

Achievements and titles
- Olympic Games: (gold) (1972)
- World Champ.: (bronze) (1971)
- Asian Champ.: (gold) (1966)
Medal record
Men's judo
Representing Japan
Olympic Games
Gold medal – first place	1972 Munich	‍–‍80 kg
World Championships
Bronze medal – third place	1971 Ludwigshafen	Open
Asian Championships
Gold medal – first place	1966 Manila	‍–‍80 kg
Bronze medal – third place	1966 Manila	Open

Profile at external databases
- IJF: 54522
- JudoInside.com: 5476
- Updated on 22 June 2023

Shinobu Sekine (関根 忍, Sekine Shinobu; 20 September 1943 – 18 December 2018) was a Japanese middleweight judoka. He won a gold medal at his only Olympics in 1972.

== Biography ==
Sekine was born in Ōarai, Ibaraki, and entered the Tokyo Metropolitan Police Department after graduating from Chuo University. He sought a spot on the Olympic judo team after seeing Isao Okano, a rival judoka also from Ibaraki Prefecture, win gold at the 1964 Summer Olympics. However, judo was not included in the program for the 1968 Summer Olympics, and Sekine entered the Olympics for the first time in 1972 as a 28-year-old veteran after winning the All-Japan Judo Championships that year. Sekine lost to Oh Seung-Lip of South Korea in the 5th round of the tournament, but won the repechage to face Oh for the second time in the Olympic final. Sekine was forced to fight defensively for most of the match, but in the few remaining seconds, he tried a Tai Otoshi which put his opponent down onto the mat. The two assistant referees were split on the outcome, but the main referee from the Netherlands ruled in favor of Sekine to award him an extremely close decision win. Oh had been leading in points for most of the match. Sekine retired shortly after winning the Olympic gold medal, and served as a coach and advisor for the All-Japan Judo Federation, and as a referee during the 1996 Summer Olympics. He also worked as an instructor for the Tokyo Police Department, and Heisei International University.

Sekine died on 18 December 2018 at the age of 75.

== See also ==
- List of judoka
- List of Olympic medalists in judo
