= Philippe Aubert =

Philippe Aubert may refer to:

- Philippe Aubert (judoka) (born 1943), Swiss judoka
- Philippe Aubert (hurdler) (born 1957), French hurdler
