= Amine Boushaki =

Algerian medalist judoka

Personal information
- Native name: أمين ابن البوسحاقي
- National team: Algeria national judo team
- Born: 4 December 1982 (age 43) Thénia, Algeria
- Occupation: Judoka
- Years active: 1988-2000
- Weight: 60 kg (132 lb)

Sport
- Country: Algeria
- Sport: Judo
- Disability: Physical disability
- Club: CMB Thénia; MC Alger
- Team: Algeria national judo team

Amine Iben El Boushaki (Arabic: أمين ابن البوسحاقي; born 4 December 1982) is an Algerian judoka.

== Early life ==
Boushaki was born in 1982 in the town of Thénia within the Col des Beni Aïcha region, in the east of the Khachna Massif and in the south-east of the town of Boumerdès.

== Training ==
Amine Boushaki started his sports career in 1988 at the age of 6.

His initial training in judo took place in the Saïd Bahria indoor training hall located in the center of Thénia.

== Teams ==
Boushaki started his judo training in a continuous manner within the CMB Thénia (CMBT) in 1988, which was the primary school in which he enrolled in his early childhood.

He moved gradually in the sporting classes in the CMBT, starting from the Under-18 athletics, then Under-20 athletics to join Under-23 athletics of judo.

He was influenced by his first coach, Salah Abbad, who had an important role in developing the judo branch for the CMBT since 1977.

After his distinction as a wrestler, Boushaki moved afterwards during the year 1994 to the ranks of the MC Algiers team in the capital, to spend a period of seven years until the day of his forced retirement.

Boushaki was considered one of the most prominent judo athletes in the first grades of MCA, and the oil company Sonatrach summoned him during that time when he was no more than twenty years old.

== National team ==
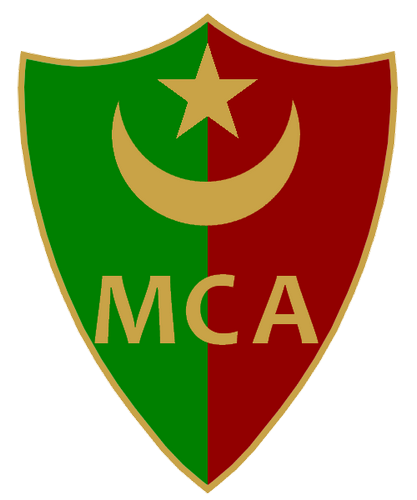
MC Alger

Boushaki won several competitions in national and international championships with the Algeria national judo team and received several trophies and medals.

On 19 May 2000, Boushaki at the age of barely 18 years old and weighing around 60 kg took part in the Algerian Judo Cup in the Hacène Harcha Arena in a competition that had opposed him to an athlete exceeding the weight of 90 kg.

This competition was part of an open sports tournament which opposed judoka athletes from different categories without distinction. An accident happened when the athlete in front weighed down on Boushaki's lumbar part, causing him to be totally paralyzed. He was rushed to the Mustapha Pacha hospital where he underwent surgery, followed by an eight-month rehabilitation period at Bouchaoui hospital.

== Awards ==
He was honored during the 1990s because he was one of the most outstanding athletes of his generation who marked the gratification of the national emblem.

== Honoring ==
Amine Boushaki was honored on 9 May 2008 at the Saïd Bahria Sports Hall in Thénia, by organizing a national judo tournament in solidarity with this athlete who was disabled while doing a wrestling with his team MC Algiers in 2001.

Twenty-four senior teams in the sport of judo from various regions of the country participated in this session, representing five provinces: Blida, Béjaïa, Tizi Ouzou, Algiers and Boumerdès, and the judo branch of the CMB Thénia team supervised the organization of this session in cooperation with the various wrestler fans who have been struggling with disability alone since his injury.

The course revenues and other subsidies have been allocated to this athlete because this solidarity session is an opportunity to remind officials of their responsibilities towards this mobility handicap and the need to take care of treating it inside and outside the country, according to the promises they made to him since his injury.
