= Philip Illingworth =

Canadian judoka

Personal information
- Born: 10 December 1948 (age 76); Pincher Creek, Alberta, Canada
- Occupation: Judoka

Sport
- Sport: Judo

Philip Illingworth (born 10 December 1948) is a Canadian judoka. He competed in the men's middleweight event at the 1972 Summer Olympics.

== See also ==
- Judo in Canada
- List of Canadian judoka
