= Wadih Gosn =

Lebanese judoka

Personal information
- Nationality: Lebanese
- Born: 26 October 1953 (age 71)

Sport
- Sport: Judo

Wadih Gosn (born 26 October 1953) is a Lebanese judoka. He competed in the men's middleweight event at the 1972 Summer Olympics.
