= Choidoryn Övgönkhüü =

Mongolian judoka (1942–2019)

Personal information
- Nationality: Mongolian
- Born: 10 October 1942; Uulbayan, Sükhbaatar, Mongolia
- Died: 2 April 2019 (aged 76); Uulbayan, Sükhbaatar, Mongolia

Sport
- Sport: Judo

Choidoryn Övgönkhüü (10 October 1942 – 2 April 2019) was a Mongolian judoka. He competed in the men's middleweight event at the 1972 Summer Olympics.
