= Alex Bijkerk =

Australian judoka

Personal information
- Full name: Alexander Henry "Alex" Bijkerk
- Nationality: Australian
- Born: 13 September 1947 (age 77)
- Height: 180 cm (5 ft 11 in)
- Weight: 80 kg (176 lb)

Sport
- Sport: Judo

Alexander Henry "Alex" Bijkerk (born 13 September 1947) is an Australian judoka. He competed in the men's middleweight event at the 1972 Summer Olympics.
