= Chang Ping-ho =

Taiwanese judoka

Personal information
- Full name: 張 平和, Pinyin: Zhāng Píng-hé
- Nationality: Taiwanese
- Born: 7 April 1943 (age 81)

Sport
- Sport: Judo

Chang Ping-ho (born 7 April 1943) is a Taiwanese judoka. He competed in the men's middleweight event at the 1972 Summer Olympics.
