= Carlos Socias =

Dominican judoka (born 1951)

Personal information
- Nationality: Dominican
- Born: 23 November 1951 (age 74)

Sport
- Sport: Judo

Carlos Socias (born 23 November 1951) is a Dominican judoka. He competed in the men's middleweight event at the 1972 Summer Olympics.
