= Orlando Ferreira =

Portuguese judoka

Personal information
- Nationality: Portuguese
- Born: 5 February 1953 (age 72)
- Occupation: Judoka

Sport
- Sport: Judo

Orlando Ferreira (born 5 February 1953) is a Portuguese judoka. He competed in the men's middleweight event at the 1972 Summer Olympics.
