= Judo at the 1993 Mediterranean Games =

Judo competition

- Location: Perpignan, France
- Dates: 20 June 1993

The Judo competition at the 1993 Mediterranean Games was held in Perpignan, France on 20 June 1993.

== Medal overview ==
=== Men ===
Event	Gold	Silver	Bronze
60 kg	(Italy) Girolamo Giovinazzo	(France) Franck Chambilly	(Algeria) Fayçal Bousbiat (Morocco) Abdelouahed Chorfi
65 kg	(Algeria) Abdelhakim Harkat	(France) Nasser Nechar	(Italy) Marino Cattedra (Spain) Francisco Lorenzo
71 kg	(France) Patrick Rosso	(Italy) Diego Brambilla	(Spain) José Cabas (Algeria) Meziane Dahmani
78 kg	(France) Laurent François	(Italy) Alessandro Pilati	(Morocco) Adil Belgaïd (Spain) Manuel Méndez
86 kg	(France) Pascal Tayot	(Spain) Fernando González	(Italy) Domenico Paduano (Croatia) Hrvoje Filipan
95 kg	(France) Stéphane Traineau	(Spain) Carlos Jodrá	(Croatia) Dragomir Tavra (Egypt) Aiman El Shewy
+95 kg	(France) Jérôme Dreyfus	(Spain) Ernesto Pérez	(Greece) Charalampos Papaioannou (Turkey) Salih Tufan Durmuş

=== Medal table ===
Rank	Nation	Gold	Silver	Bronze	Total
1	France	5	2	0	7
2	Italy	1	2	2	5
3	Algeria	1	0	2	3
4	Spain	0	3	3	6
5	Croatia	0	0	2	2
5	Morocco	0	0	2	2
7	Egypt	0	0	1	1
7	Greece	0	0	1	1
7	Turkey	0	0	1	1
Totals (9 entries)		7	7	14	28
