= Ricardo Andersen =

Argentine judoka (born 1960)

Personal information
- Nationality: Argentine
- Born: 3 March 1960 (age 65)

Sport
- Sport: Judo

Ricardo Andersen (born 3 March 1960) is an Argentine judoka. He competed in the men's heavyweight event at the 1984 Summer Olympics.
