= Algerian Judo Federation =

Governing body of judo in Algeria

- Sport: Judo
- Category: Martial art; Combat sport
- Jurisdiction: Algeria
- Abbreviation: FAJ
- Founded: 1964
- Affiliation: IJF
- Regional affiliation: AJU
- Headquarters: Algiers
- President: Yacine Silini

Official website
- fajudo.dz
- (Algeria)

Algerian Judo Federation (FAJ) is the governing body of Judo in Algeria, and a member of the world governing body, the IJF, and the AJU. JSA is also a member of the Algerian Olympic and Sport Committee.

The FAJ organizes the Algerian Open Championships and the Algerian Cup in all categories (seniors and juniors, men and women).

The FAJ assembles the Algeria national judo team.

== History ==
The Japanese martial art Judo was first introduced in Algeria in the 19th century, during the colonization period by France.

The organization was founded in 1963 and joined the IJF in 1964. Ahmed Hifri, Hachidan, is the founder of the first Algeria national judo team as well as the national coach from 1971 to 1975.

Soraya Haddad won a bronze medal at the 2008 Summer Olympics.

In 2021, Algerian Judo player Fethi Nourine was banned for 10 years from competition by the International Judo Federation with his coach, Amar Benikhlef receiving 10 years ban, as well when they withdrew from facing an Israeli opponent in the second round of men's competition at the Boudakan. The duo revealed that they pulled out from the competition in support for the Palestinians.

Algeria was the most successful nation at the African Judo Championships in 2022.

=== Algerian judo and COVID-19 ===
Judo was also affected by COVID-19 in its championship. New protocols and guidelines were mapped out for the safety of everyone in every event. During the Tunis African Open in 2022, the athletes were made to sign a COVID-19 form for Declaration of Honour of being tested negative. The form had items like whether the delegates had close contacts with positive person, symptoms of COVID-19, attending international training camps with athletes from different countries, having been tested positive for COVID-19 and being vaccinated with the full doses. The form also contained information that if the undersigned is found guilty during the travel or stay that he would be removed from the event with disciplinary actions taken against him.

== See also ==
- List of judo organizations
- Judo by country
