= Rodrigue Ossandza =

Congolese judoka

Personal information
- Nationality: DR Congo
- Occupation: Judoka

Sport
- Sport: Judo
Medal record
Representing Zaire
Men's judo
African Championships
Bronze medal – third place	1996 South Africa	-60 kg

Profile at external databases
- JudoInside.com: 3051

Rodrigue Ossandza is a Congolese judoka.

== Achievements ==
Year	Tournament	Place	Weight class
1996	African Judo Championships	3rd	Extra-lightweight (-60 kg)
