= Gerd Egger =

German judoka

Personal information
- Nationality: German
- Born: 8 October 1943 (age 81); Lindau, Germany
- Occupation: Judoka

Sport
- Sport: Judo
- Rank: 9th dan black belt

Profile at external databases
- JudoInside.com: 4794

Gerd Egger (born 8 October 1943) is a German judoka. He competed in the men's middleweight event at the 1972 Summer Olympics.
