= Pierre Paris =

Swiss judoka

Personal information
- Nationality: Swiss
- Born: 10 June 1947
- Died: 13 November 2010 (aged 63)
- Occupation: Judoka

Sport
- Sport: Judo

Pierre Paris (10 June 1947 – 13 November 2010) was a Swiss judoka. He competed in the men's heavyweight event at the 1972 Summer Olympics.
