= Tommy Tegelgård =

Swedish judoka

Personal information
- Nationality: Swedish
- Born: 24 October 1948 (age 76); Stockholm, Sweden

Sport
- Sport: Judo

Tommy Tegelgård (born 24 October 1948) is a Swedish judoka. He competed in the men's middleweight event at the 1972 Summer Olympics.
