= Cherdpong Punsoni =

Thai judoka (born 1947)

Personal information
- Nationality: Thai
- Born: 17 November 1947 (age 78) Thailand
- Died: 2023 USA
- Occupation: Judoka

Sport
- Sport: Judo

Cherdpong Punsoni (1947–2023) is a Thai judoka. He competed in the men's middleweight event at the 1972 Summer Olympics.
