= Sherif El-Digwy =

Egyptian judoka

Personal information
- Nationality: Egyptian
- Born: 16 April 1965 (age 60)

Sport
- Sport: Judo

Sherif El-Digwy (born 16 April 1965) is an Egyptian judoka. He competed in the men's heavyweight event at the 1984 Summer Olympics.
