= Erich Butka =

Austrian judoka

Personal information
- Nationality: Austrian
- Born: 1 February 1944
- Died: 20 August 2017 (aged 73)
- Occupation: Judoka

Sport
- Sport: Judo

Profile at external databases
- JudoInside.com: 5646

Erich Butka (1 February 1944 – 20 August 2017) was an Austrian judoka. He competed in the men's heavyweight event at the 1972 Summer Olympics.
