= 1966 Asian Judo Championships =

Judo competition

The 1966 Asian Judo Championships were held in Manila, Philippines.

== Medal overview ==
=== Men's events ===
Event	Gold	Silver	Bronze
Lightweight (68 kg)	Yujiro Yamazaki (JPN)	An Jong-Hwan (KOR)	Chang (ROC)
Lightweight (68 kg)	Yujiro Yamazaki (JPN)	An Jong-Hwan (KOR)	Chang (ROC)
Middleweight (80 kg)	Shinobu Sekine (JPN)	Yoon Bok-Kyun (KOR)	Henry Ruth (MAS)
Middleweight (80 kg)	Shinobu Sekine (JPN)	Yoon Bok-Kyun (KOR)	Chang (ROC)
Heavyweight (+80 kg)	Nobuyuki Maejima (JPN)	Osamu Sato (JPN)	Shin Suk Ki (KOR)
Heavyweight (+80 kg)	Nobuyuki Maejima (JPN)	Osamu Sato (JPN)	Paulus Prananto (INA)
Openweight	Nobuyuki Maejima (JPN)	Osamu Sato (JPN)	Shinobu Sekine (JPN)
Openweight	Nobuyuki Maejima (JPN)	Osamu Sato (JPN)	Yoon Bok-Kyun (KOR)

=== Medals table ===
Rank	Nation	Gold	Silver	Bronze	Total
1	Japan (JPN)	4	2	1	7
2	South Korea (KOR)	0	2	2	4
3	Republic of China (ROC)	0	0	3	3
4	Indonesia (INA)	0	0	1	1
4	Malaysia (MAS)	0	0	1	1
Totals (5 entries)		4	4	8	16
