= Desiderio Lebron =

Dominican Republic judoka (born 1949)

Personal information
- Nationality: Dominican / Jamaican
- Born: 19 December 1949 (age 76)
- Height: 1.84 m (6 ft 0 in)
- Weight: 98 kg (216 lb)

Sport
- Sport: Judo, athletics

Desiderio Lebron (born 19 December 1949) is a Dominican Republic judoka. He competed in the men's heavyweight event at the 1984 Summer Olympics.

Earlier he competed in athletics specialising in the discus throw.

== Athletics competitions ==
Year	Competition	Venue	Position	Event	Notes
Representing the Dominican Republic
1974	Central American and Caribbean Games	Santo Domingo, Dominican Republic	7th	Discus throw	45.46 m
1978	Central American and Caribbean Games	Medellín, Colombia	6th	Discus throw	46.72 m
