= Glorieuse Guillaume =

Mauritian judoka and weightlifter

Personal information
- Born: December 6, 1973 (age 51); Rodrigues

Sport
- Country: Mauritius
- Sport: Judo
- Weight class: –56 kg

Glorieuse Guillaume (born 6 December 1973) is a Mauritian athlete who competed in judo and weightlifting.

== Biography ==
Guillaume was born in Bigarade, on the Mauritian island of Rodrigues, but moved to the island of Mauritius to pursue an athletic career in judo.

She won her first medal, a silver, in the 1990 Indian Ocean Island Games in Madagascar in the under 63 kg category, and then won gold at the 1993 edition of the games. Following that competition, she switched to the under 56 kg category. She earned third place at the 1996 Commonwealth Championships in Vacoas, Mauritius, and won a silver medal at the African Championships in South Africa later that year. Guillaume held the title of women's judo champion in Mauritius at several points through her career.

In 1997, Guillaume injured a ligament in her knee which ended her career in judo. However, she continued to compete in weightlifting, and won three silver medals in the 2003 Indian Ocean Island Games. She later purchased a house in Dagotière and worked in a factory nearby. Following continued health problems, including osteoporosis that necessitated the use of a cane, she was forced to quit her job and apply for a disability pension. Guillaume was an advocate for the state to provide financial assistance to retired athletes. She was one recipient of a small allowance for athletes from the Mauritian government in 2017.
