= Fernando Ferreyros =

Peruvian judoka

Personal information
- Nationality: Peruvian
- Born: 16 August 1960 (age 64)

Sport
- Sport: Judo

Fernando Ferreyros (born 16 August 1960) is a Peruvian judoka. He competed in the men's heavyweight event at the 1984 Summer Olympics.
