= Manavi =

Manavi მანავი
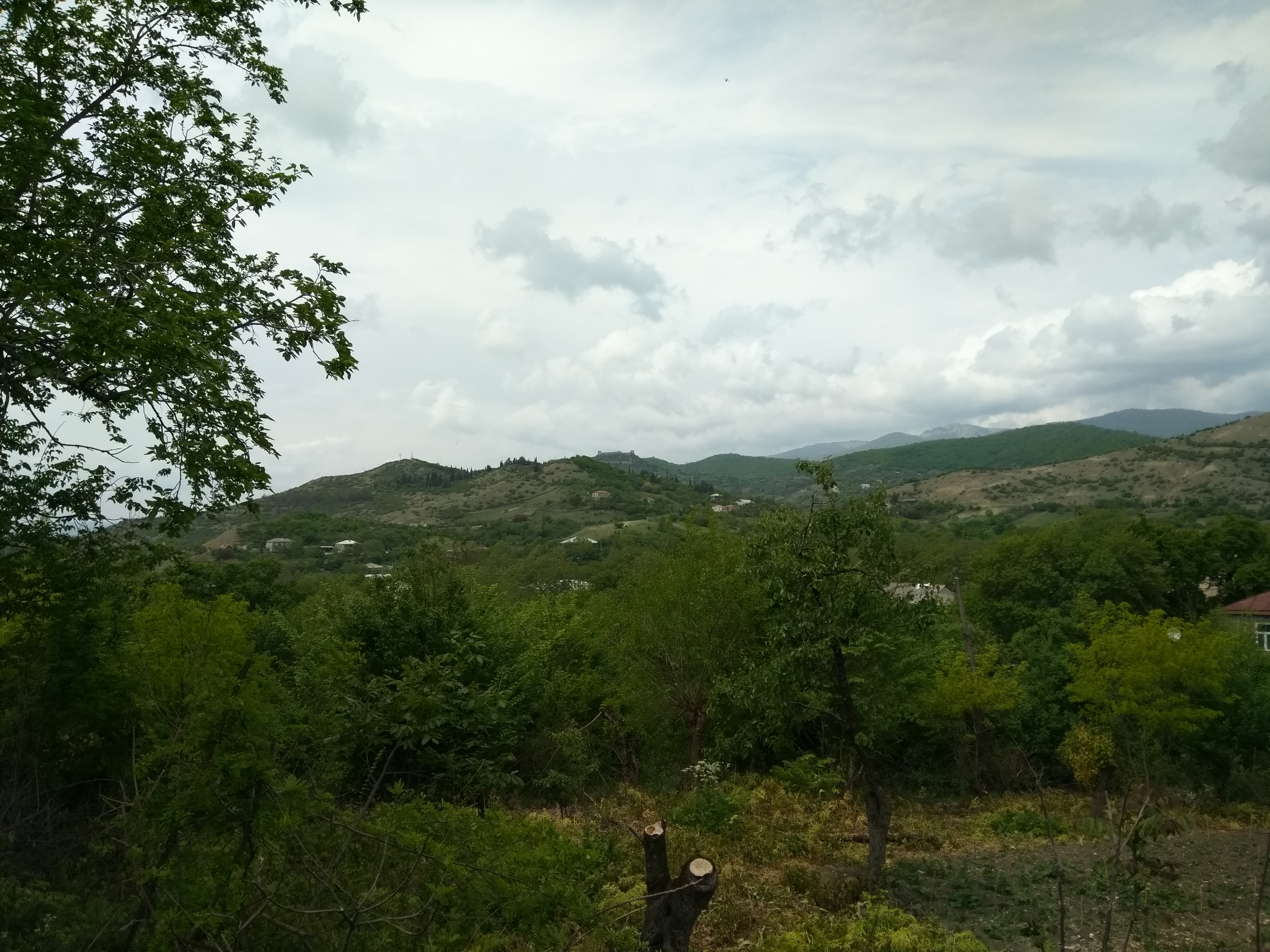
- Panorama of Manavi

- Location in Georgia
- Coordinates: 41°43′06″N 45°27′46″E
- Country: Georgia
- Region: Kakheti
- Municipality: Sagarejo
- Elevation: 750 m (2,460 ft)

Population (2014)
  - Total: 2,769
- Time zone: UTC+4

Manavi (Georgian: მანავი) is a village in the Sagarejo Municipality, Kakheti region, Georgia. It is famous for its yellowish green wine, Manavis Mtsvane. In Georgia, wine drinking is central to the culture and is especially recommended for long celebrations. Olympic judoka Guram Gogolauri was born here.

== See also ==
- Kakheti
