= Hrvoje Filipan =

Croatian judoka

Hrvoje Filipan (born 22 August 1972) is a Croatian judoka.

== Achievements ==
| Year | Tournament | Place | Weight class |
|---|---|---|---|
| 1995 | European Judo Championships | 7th | Middleweight (86 kg) |
| 1993 | Mediterranean Games | 3rd | Middleweight (86 kg) |
