= Luis Arredondo =

Mexican judoka (born 1952)

Personal information
- Nationality: Mexican
- Born: 24 June 1952 (age 73)

Sport
- Sport: Judo

Luis Arredondo (born 24 June 1952) is a Mexican judoka. He competed in the men's middleweight event at the 1972 Summer Olympics.
