= Sanama Agoume =

Cameroonian judoka

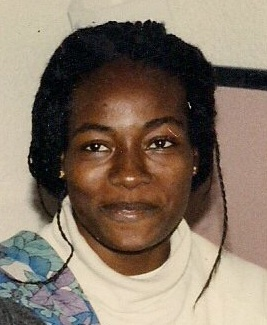

Personal information
- Full name: Sanama Anne Agoume
- Occupation: Judoka

Sport
- Country: Cameroon
- Sport: Judo
- Weight class: ‍–‍61 kg, ‍–‍63 kg, ‍–‍66 kg

Achievements and titles
- World Champ.: R32 (1997)
- African Champ.: (silver) (1999)
Medal record
Women's judo
Representing Cameroon
African Games
Silver medal – second place	1999 Johannesburg	‍–‍63 kg
African Championships
Bronze medal – third place	2000 Algiers	‍–‍63 kg
Jeux de la Francophonie
Bronze medal – third place	1994 Paris	‍–‍61 kg

Profile at external databases
- IJF: 58956
- JudoInside.com: 10361
- Updated on 11 February 2026

Sanama Anne Agoume is a Cameroonian judoka.

== Career ==
Agoume won a bronze medal at the 1994 Jeux de la Francophonie in Paris, France, in the under 61 kg category. She won a silver medal at the 1999 All-Africa Games in Johannesburg, South Africa, in the welterweight category. She won a bronze medal at the 2000 African Championships in Algiers, Algeria.
