= Tommy Andrianatvoo =

Malagasy judoka (born 1945)

Personal information
- Nationality: Malagasy
- Born: 1 April 1945 (age 79)

Sport
- Sport: Judo

Tommy Andrianatvoo (born 1 April 1945) is a Malagasy judoka. He competed in the men's heavyweight event at the 1972 Summer Olympics.
