= Leslie MacPhail =

Belgian judoka

Personal information
- Nationality: Belgian
- Born: 4 June 1952; Antwerp, Belgium
- Died: 3 April 2008 (aged 55)

Sport
- Sport: Judo

Leslie MacPhail (4 June 1952 – 3 April 2008) was a Belgian judoka. He competed in the men's heavyweight event at the 1972 Summer Olympics.
