= Simo Akrenius =

Finnish judoka (born 1949)

Personal information
- Nationality: Finnish
- Born: 22 July 1949 (age 75); Helsinki, Finland
- Occupation: Judoka

Sport
- Sport: Judo

Profile at external databases
- JudoInside.com: 8652

Simo Akrenius (born 22 July 1949) is a Finnish judoka. He competed in the men's middleweight event at the 1972 Summer Olympics.
