= Guram Gogolauri =

Georgian judoka

Personal information
- Nationality: Georgian
- Born: 28 April 1944 (age 80); Manavi, Georgia

Sport
- Sport: Judo

Guram Gogolauri (born 28 April 1944) is a Georgian judoka. He competed in the men's middleweight event at the 1972 Summer Olympics, representing the Soviet Union.
