= Rick Littlewood =

New Zealand judoka (1940–2018)

Personal information
- Full name: Garrick Lenin Littlewood
- Born: 7 December 1940; Gisborne, New Zealand
- Died: 24 July 2018 (aged 77); Auckland, New Zealand

Sport
- Country: New Zealand
- Sport: Judo

Garrick Lenin Littlewood (7 December 1940 – 24 July 2018) was a New Zealand judoka. He competed in the men's middleweight event at the 1972 Summer Olympics. Littlewood died in Auckland on 24 July 2018.
