= Motoki Nishimura =

Japanese judoka

Personal information
- Born: 8 June 1947 (age 79)
- Occupation: Judoka

Sport
- Country: Japan
- Sport: Judo
- Weight class: +93 kg

Achievements and titles
- Olympic Games: (bronze) (1972)
- Asian Champ.: (gold) (1972)
Medal record
Men's judo
Representing Japan
Olympic Games
Bronze medal – third place	1972 Munich	+93 kg
Asian Championships
Gold medal – first place	1972 Kaohsiung	Open
Summer Universiade
Gold medal – first place	1967 Tokyo	+93 kg

Profile at external databases
- IJF: 54557
- JudoInside.com: 5447
- Updated on 24 June 2023

Motoki Nishimura (西村 昌樹, Nishimura Motoki; born 8 June 1947) is a Japanese former judoka who competed in the 1972 Summer Olympics.
