= CMB Thénia =

Algerian football club located in Thénia, Algeria

- Full name: Chabab Moustaqbal Baladiat de Thénia
- Nickname: El Hamra
- Founded: 1910
- Ground: Stade de Thénia, Thénia, Algeria
- Capacity: 5,000
- League: Ligue Nationale du Football Amateur; Ligue Régional I; Ligue Régional II; Ligue de Football de la Wilaya
| Home colours | Away colours |

Chabab Moustaqbal Baladiat de Thénia (Arabic: شباب مستقبل بلدية الثنية), known as CMB Thénia or CMBT for short, is an Algerian football club located in Thénia, Algeria. The club was founded in 1910 and its colours are red and white. Their home stadium, Stade de Thénia, has a capacity of 8,000 spectators. The club is currently playing the Ligue Nationale du Football Amateur.

== History ==
The club was founded in 1910 before the independence of Algeria within the town of Thénia (former Ménerville) to practice several sports, including rugby, basketball, and football.

This club was named Sporting Club Ménervillois (SCM) and was known to play football competitions during French colonial times, and both were affiliated with the French Football Federation (FFF) and the League Algiers Football Association (LAFA).

During the 1933–1934 season, the SCM was involved in the Second Division of the Algiers Football League, and during the 1947–48 League Algiers season, the SCM was also part of the teams playing in the Second Division of this league.

After the consecration of this club in the discipline of football on 27 October 1940, it played several competitions during sports seasons until the recovery of national sovereignty.

At Algerian independence in 1962, this club was renamed with the name of Thénia to replace the French Algeria colonial name Ménerville, in order to promote juvenile and school sport.

After the independence of Algeria in 1962, just after Ménerville was renamed Thénia in 1965, the SCM became the Espérance Sportive de Thénia (EST). Some time later in 1972, the EST took the Arabic name of Chabab Moustaqbal Madinate Thénia (CMMT), which means in English "Youth of the future of the city of Thénia". In 1979, the CMMT was renamed Chabab Moustaqbal Baladiyate Thénia (CMBT), which means in English "Youth of the future of the town of Thénia".

== Club identity ==
=== Colours ===
Since the establishment of the club, its colours are the white and the red.

=== Crest ===
Historical evolution of the club's crest.

== 1962–63 Algerian Cup ==
16 December 1962

| RC Arbaâ | 3 – 1 | CR Ménerville (CMB Thénia) |

Stadium of Dellys, Dellys

== 1962–63 Algerian Championnat National: Group II ==
| Pos | Team | Pld | W | D | L | GF | GA | GD | Pts | Promotion or relegation |
|---|---|---|---|---|---|---|---|---|---|---|
| 1 | NA Hussein Dey | 18 | 16 | 0 | 2 | 60 | 15 | +45 | 50 | Qualification to a final group, promoted for 1963–64 Honor Division |
| 2 | JS El Biar | 18 | 13 | 2 | 3 | 61 | 18 | +43 | 46 | Promoted for 1963–64 Honor Division |
| 3 | ASPTT Alger | 18 | 12 | 3 | 3 | 42 | 14 | +28 | 45 | Promoted for 1963–64 Honor Division |
| 4 | WA Rivet | 18 | 9 | 3 | 6 | 41 | 32 | +9 | 39 | Promoted for 1963–64 Pre Honor Division (D2) |
| 5 | US Aumale | 18 | 8 | 3 | 7 | 46 | 30 | +16 | 37 | Promoted for 1963–64 Pre Honor Division (D2) |
| 6 | MC Bouira | 18 | 7 | 4 | 7 | 44 | 40 | +4 | 36 | Promoted for 1963–64 Pre Honor Division (D2) |
| 7 | RU Alger | 18 | 4 | 4 | 10 | 23 | 35 | −12 | 30 | Relegated to 1963–64 First Division (D3) |
| 8 | US Palestro | 18 | 5 | 2 | 11 | 28 | 51 | −23 | 30 | Relegated to 1963–64 First Division (D3) |
| 9 | Sporting Club Ménervillois | 18 | 4 | 1 | 13 | 27 | 67 | −40 | 27 | Relegated to 1963–64 First Division (D3) |
| 10 | HC Aïn Bessem | 18 | 1 | 0 | 17 | 14 | 83 | −69 | 20 | Relegated to 1963–64 First Division (D3) |

Source: rsssf.com

| Home \ Away | ASPT | HCAB | JSB | MCB | NAH | RUA | SCM | USA | USP | WAR |
|---|---|---|---|---|---|---|---|---|---|---|
| ASPT | | | | | | | | | | |
| HCAB | | | | | | | | | | |
| JSB | | | | | | | | | | |
| MCB | | | | | | | | | | |
| NAH | | | | | | | | | | |
| RUA | | | | | | | | | | |
| Sporting Club Ménervillois | 1–6 | 3–3 | 1–5 | 0–4 | 4–8 | 2–1 | | 1–1 | 3–6 | 0–2 |
| USA | | | | | | | | | | |
| USP | | | | | | | | | | |
| WAR | | | | | | | | | | |

Updated to match(es) played on March 2021. Source: rsssf.com
Legend: Blue = home team win; Yellow = draw; Red = away team win.

== 1969–70 Algerian Cup ==
21 December 1969

| USM Blida | 3 – 2 | ES Thénia (CMB Thénia) |

Stadium of Brakni, Blida

== Regional league I ==
=== 1970–71 season ===
The ES Thénia team was crowned Regional League I Champion during the 1970–1971 season under the direction of coach Brahim Ramdani.

=== 2001–02 season ===
The CMBT finished third in the standings after WA Boufarik and ESM Koléa, in the Algerian Third Division Football Championship (D3) for the 2001–2002 season, and was then promoted to the second division (D2 ) for the next season.

18 February 2002

| USMM Hadjout | ? – ? | CMB Thénia |

Zioui Brothers Stadium, Hussein Dey
15 March 2002

| CMB Thénia | 0 – 1 | IRB El Oued |

=== 2002–03 season ===
The CMBT ended the 2002–2003 season by being maintained at the level of the League of Regional 1 in Division 3, and this after having played 26 matches of which it won a total of 21 matches.

=== 2003–04 season ===
At the end of the 2003–2004 season, CMB Thénia was relegated to Regional 1 in Division 4 for the next 2004–2005 season after having won only 5 games during the past season, and losing 21 other games, and could only have recorded 21 points, which earned him the fall with the two teams of ES Ben Aknoun and CRB Tamanrasset.

| Pos | Team | Pld | W | D | L | GF | GA | GD | Pts |
|---|---|---|---|---|---|---|---|---|---|
| 1 | CMB Thénia | 34 | 5 | 8 | 21 | 20 | 63 | −43 | 23 |

Source: rsssf.com

=== 2004–05 season ===
The CMBT evolved during the season 2004–2005 at the level of the League of Regional 1 in Division 4.

28 April 2005

| CMB Thénia | 1 – 0 | JS Azazga |

== Regional league II ==
CMB Thenia secured the title of Ligue Régional II champion for the 2007–2008 season.

=== 2005–06 season ===
The CMBT evolved during the 2005–2006 season in the Regional II championship where it produced significant sporting performances.

=== 2006–07 season ===
The CMBT evolved during the 2006–2007 season in the Regional II championship where it produced significant sporting performances.

=== 2007–08 season ===
The CMBT got off to a good start in the 2007–08 season with a near-perfect run that earned it the Ligue Régional II championship chair he held alone with 14 points, four wins and two draws.

=== 2008–09 season ===
17 November 2008

| CMB Thénia | 0 – 1 | Hydra AC |

20 February 2009

| CMB Thénia | 0 – 1 | CRB Bordj El-Kiffan |

Stadium of Bordj El-Kiffan, Bordj El Kiffan
3 April 2009

| CMB Thénia | 2 – 1 | ESM Boudouaou |

Stadium of Thénia, Thénia

=== 2009–10 season ===
14 March 2010

| CMB Thénia | 0 – 1 | CA Kouba |

== Regional league I ==
In 2010, the CMBT acceded to the Ligue Régional I as representative of the Boumerdès Province teams.

The CMB Thénia club was demoted to the Ligue de Football de la Wilaya in October 2012 after the match where it faced the ES Kouba team.

=== 2010–11 season ===
14 November 2010

| DRB Staouéli | 3 – 3 | CMB Thénia |

Stadium of Reghaïa, Reghaïa
26 November 2010

| CMB Thénia | 2 – 0 | MB Bouira |

26 December 2010

| USO Amizour | 2 – 0 | CMB Thénia |

Stadium of Thénia, Thénia
31 December 2010

| ARB Ghriss | 0 – 0 | CMB Thénia |

Stade de l'Unité Africaine, Mascara
23 March 2011

| JS El Biar | 3 – 0 | CMB Thénia |

Stadium of El Biar, El Biar

=== 2011–12 season ===
30 October 2011

| O Boumerdès | 1 – 1 | CMB Thénia |

25 November 2011

| IR Bir Mourad Rais | 2 – 2 | CMB Thénia |

23 January 2012

| JS Azazga | 1 – 2 | CMB Thénia |

28 April 2012

| USO Amizour | 4 – 2 | CMB Thénia |

== League Boumerdès Football Association ==
=== 2012–13 season ===
19 October 2012

| ES Kouba | 0 – 0 | CMB Thénia |

== 2010 squad ==
As of 27 December 2020. Note: Flags indicate national team as defined under FIFA eligibility rules; some limited exceptions apply. Players may hold more than one non-FIFA nationality.

| No. | Pos. | Nation | Player |
|---|---|---|---|
| 1 | GK | ALG | Khaled Boushaki |
| 2 | DF | ALG | Hadjila |
| 3 | DF | ALG | Rabah Khalkhal (captain) |
| 4 | DF | ALG | Yahi |
| 5 | MF | ALG | Khenifi |
| 6 | MF | ALG | Boussaïda |
| 7 | MF | ALG | Khettab |
| 8 | MF | ALG | Kebous |
| 9 | FW | ALG | Boudjela |
| 10 | MF | ALG | Slimane |
| 11 | FW | ALG | Lachab |

== Club presidents ==
| No | Name | From | To |
|---|---|---|---|
| 1 | (Algeria) Mouloud Hadjeres | 1965 | 1968 |
| 2 | (Algeria) Ammi Tahar | 1968 | 1971 |
| 3 | (Algeria) Allal Mezali | 2007 | 2009 |
| 4 | (Algeria) Mohamed Allalou | 2009 | 2011 |
| 5 | (Algeria) Ali Boushaki | 2015 | 2018 |

== Managers list ==
- (Algeria) Brahim Ramdani (1969 – 1970)
- (Algeria) Ali Tabet (1970 – 1971)
- (Algeria) Aziz Ferhat (1999 – 2001)
- (Algeria) Ahmed Aït El Hocine (2001 – 2003)
- (Algeria) Amar Medjerab (2003 – 2005)
- (Algeria) Malik Ferhat (2005 – 2007)
- (Algeria) Aziz Ferhat (2007 – 2009)
- (Algeria) Karim Kaced (2009 – 2010)
- (Algeria) Malik Ferhat (2010 – 2011)
- (Algeria) Rabah Talamali (2011 – 2012)
- (Algeria) Malik Ferhat (2012 – 2016)
- (Algeria) Abdelghani Deraï (2016 – 2018)
- (Algeria) Mohamed Amine Boushaki (2018 – 2021)

== Notable former players ==
- (Algeria) Amine Boushaki, judoka

== See also ==
- League Boumerdès Football Association
