= Matthew Folan =

Irish judoka

Personal information
- Nationality: Irish
- Born: 25 May 1942 (age 84)
- Occupation: Judoka

Sport
- Sport: Judo

Matthew “Matt” Folan (born 25 May 1942) is an Irish judoka, sports administrator, and businessman.

From 1959 to 1969, Folan worked as a radio officer with the Greek Merchant Navy. After returning to Ireland, he represented Ireland in the men's heavyweight and open weight events at the 1972 Summer Olympics in Munich. The International Judo Federation lists him as placing fifth at the 1973 World Judo Championships in Lausanne.

After the Olympics, Folan was involved in coaching, served as the President of the Irish Judo Association, and became the first Irish international judo referee. Olympedia also describes him as a businessman, owner of Gemini International Ltd, and president of Irish Mensa.
