= Salah Rekik =

Tunisian judoka (born 1965)

Personal information
- Nationality: Tunisian
- Born: 5 July 1965 (age 59)

Sport
- Sport: Judo

Salah Rekik (born 5 July 1965) is a Tunisian judoka. He competed in the men's half-middleweight event at the 1992 Summer Olympics.
