= Ghoul (2015 film) =

- Theatrical release poster
- Directed by: Petr Jákl
- Written by: Petr Jákl; Petr Bok
- Produced by: Petr Jákl
- Starring: Jennifer Armour; Jeremy Isabella; Paul S. Tracey
- Cinematography: Jan Suster
- Edited by: Matous Outrata
- Music by: Karel Havlicek
- Production companies: J.B.J Film; Vega, Baby
- Distributed by: Bioscop; Phase 4 Films
- Release date: February 26, 2015 (Czech Republic)
- Running time: 89 minutes
- Country: Czech Republic
- Language: English
- Box office: $687,644 (CZ)

Ghoul is a 2015 English-language Czech 3D horror film, directed by Petr Jákl, written by Jákl and Petr Bok, and starring Jennifer Armour, Jeremy Isabella, and Paul S. Tracey. An American film crew goes to Ukraine to investigate stories of widespread cannibalism, only to summon the spirit of Andrei Chikatilo, a notorious serial killer and cannibal. It is shot in found footage format.

== Plot ==
Drawn by stories of widespread cannibalism during the Holodomor man-made famines (an act of genocide against Ukrainian people by Stalin) of the 1930s in Soviet Ukraine, an amateur filming crew from America interviews subjects in Kyiv. They find that the urban legends confirm what had happened, and are they led to a local psychic-cum-clairvoyant, who tells them that paranormal entities were behind the bloodshed. The crew does not take her warning seriously, in drunkenness they perform a séance involving a pentagram, in which they mockingly summon the disembodied ghost of Andrei Chikatilo, a notorious serial killer and cannibal who was active in the late 1970s and 1980s. The next morning, strange and eerie occurrences startle the crew, while they are unable to leave the place or get help. The Ukrainian psychic tries but fails to evict Chikatilo's presence, following which all hell breaks lose, she herself gets possessed and Chikatilo begins his killing spree again, they meet their gruesome ends, all alone and one by one.

== Cast ==
- Jennifer Armour as Jenny
- Jeremy Isabella as Ethan
- Paul S. Tracey as Ryan
- Alina Golovlyova as Katarina
- Inna Belikova as Inna

== Production ==
Shooting began in November 2011 in Ukraine and lasted for three weeks. After he finished editing in summer 2012, director Jákl shot more footage in Prague and the surrounding area over another ten days. Jákl finished post-production in 2015, two weeks before the premiere. The film was shot in 3D and was not converted. Jákl was inspired to make a film about Chikatilo after he heard stories from Ukrainians at a film festival where he was showing his first film.

== Release ==
Ghoul premiered on 26 February 2015 in the Czech Republic in both 2D and 3D. It was a box office success there. It was released in the United States on 20 March 2015.

== Reception ==
The review aggregator Rotten Tomatoes reported that 25% of critics have given the film a positive review based on 8 reviews, with an average rating of 3.58/10. Metacritic, another review aggregator, gave it a weighted average score of 32 out of 100 based on 4 reviews, indicating "generally unfavorable reviews". André Crous of The Prague Post wrote, "The decision to add a real cannibal to the mix won't push it into the realm of terror that Cannibal Holocaust or even The Blair Witch Project occupy, but it does help drive the story when there is little else happening." Justin Lowe of The Hollywood Reporter called it "derivative, uninspired material" that requires "an inordinate amount of patience" for any payoff. Maitland McDonagh of Film Journal International wrote, "And while Ghoul doesn't exactly crackle, it is remarkably creepy, even if it's hard to work up a lot of initial sympathy for the callow, smug young filmmakers". Martin Tsai of the Los Angeles Times wrote, "Ghoul can't decide whether it should be about cannibals, serial killers, ghosts or demons". Michael Gingold of Fangoria rated it 1.5/5 stars and wrote that it "ultimately offers nothing new to the supernatural/mock-doc horror subgenres". Rob Staeger of The Village Voice wrote that characters are difficult to distinguish, but it "rewards attention for much of its running time with subtle scares and growing unease, before squandering it in a shaky chase through twisted corridors that goes nowhere unexpected." Pat Torfe of Bloody Disgusting rated it 2/5 stars and wrote, "Despite it being a hit in its native Czech Republic, Ghoul fails at being nothing more than a rip-off of the films that have come before it (and have done it MUCH better)." Martin Kudlac of Twitch Film wrote, "An incremental step for the genre, but a big jump for Petr Jákl, Ghoul proves that a domestic production can be carried out and achieve international standards, and can even be vital enough to beat the competition."

It won the Vicious Cat Award at the Grossmann film and wine festival.
