= Lovelyn Orji-Ben =

Nigerian judoka

Personal information
- Full name: Lovelyn Orji-Ben
- Nationality: Nigeria
- Born: 3 December 1979 (age 46) Nigeria

Sport
- Sport: Judo
- Event: 48 kg
Medal record
Women's judo
Representing Nigeria
African Judo Championships
Bronze medal – third place	1997 Casablanca	48 kg
Bronze medal – third place	2000 Algiers	48 kg
African Games
Bronze medal – third place	1999 Johannesburg	-48 kg

Lovelyn Orji-Ben (born 3 December 1979) is a Nigerian judoka who competed in the women's 48 kg events. She won a bronze medal at the 1999 Pan African Games and two bronze medals at the African Judo Championships in 1997 and 2000.

== Sports career ==
At African Judo Championships Lovelyn has won two medals in total. The first being the 1997 African Judo Championships held in Casablanca, Morocco. Lovelyn took part in the 48 kg event where she won the bronze medal. The second at the 2000 African Judo Championships held in Algiers, Algeria where she won a silver medal also in the 48 kg event.

At 1999 All-Africa Games was held in Johannesburg, South Africa, she won a bronze medal after participating in the 48 kg event.
