= Jean-Claude Raphael =

Mauritian judoka (born 1973)

Medal record

Men's judo

Representing Mauritius

All-Africa Games
Silver medal – second place	1999 Johannesburg	90 kg
Silver medal – second place	1999 Johannesburg	Open

African Championships
Gold medal – first place	1998 Dakar	90 kg
Bronze medal – third place	1997 Casablanca	86 kg
Bronze medal – third place	1996 South Africa	86 kg

Jean-Claude Raphael (born 5 March 1973) is a Mauritian judoka.

Raphael represented Mauritius at the Atlanta Olympics in 1996 and achieved 9th at the Sydney Olympics in 2000. He is a Commonwealth Games Gold medalist, Indian Ocean Games Gold medalist, African Judo Championship Gold medalist and has competed internationally for many years before retiring from professional competition after the Sydney Olympic Games.

== Achievements ==
Year	Tournament	Place	Weight class
2000	Olympic Games	9th	Middleweight (90 kg)
2000	World Masters Munich	5th	Middleweight (90 kg)
2000	African Championships	3rd	Middleweight (90 kg)
1999	All-Africa Games	2nd	Middleweight (90 kg)
1999	All-Africa Games	2nd	Open class
1998	Commonwealth Championships	1st	Middleweight (90 kg)
1998	African Championships	1st	Middleweight (90 kg)
1997	African Championships	3rd	Middleweight (86 kg)
1996	African Championships	3rd	Middleweight (86 kg)
1996	Commonwealth Championships	3rd	Middleweight (86 kg)
1996	Olympic Games		Middleweight (86 kg)
