= Jean de Dieu Razafimahatratra =

Malagasy judoka (1948–2026)

Personal information
- Nationality: Malagasy
- Born: 4 July 1947
- Died: January 2026 (aged 78)

Sport
- Sport: Judo

Jean de Dieu Razafimahatratra (4 July 1947 – January 2026) was a Malagasy judoka. He competed in the men's middleweight event at the 1972 Summer Olympics. Razafimahatratra died in January 2026, at the age of 78.
