= László Ipacs =

Hungarian judoka

Personal information
- Nationality: Hungarian
- Born: 13 January 1946 (age 79); Battonya, Hungary
- Occupation: Judoka

Sport
- Sport: Judo

Profile at external databases
- JudoInside.com: 5273

László Ipacs (born 13 January 1946) is a Hungarian judoka. He competed at the 1972 Summer Olympics and the 1976 Summer Olympics.
