= M'Bagnick M'Bodj =

Senegalese judoka

Personal information
- Nationality: Senegalese
- Born: 7 August 1940 (age 84)

Sport
- Sport: Judo

M'Bagnick M'Bodj (born 7 August 1940) is a Senegalese judoka. He competed in the men's heavyweight event at the 1972 Summer Olympics.
