= Steeve Nguema Ndong =

Gabonese judoka

Personal information
- Nickname: Fhat
- Born: 11 December 1971
- Died: 25 September 2009 (aged 37)
- Occupation: Judoka

Sport
- Sport: Judo
Medal record
Men's judo
All-Africa Games
Silver medal – second place	1999 Johannesburg	+100 kg

Profile at external databases
- JudoInside.com: 8960

Steve Wilfried Nguema Ndong (11 December 1971 – 25 September 2009) was a Gabonese judoka.

== Achievements ==
Year	Tournament	Place	Weight class
2002	African Judo Championships	3rd	Heavyweight (+100 kg)
2001	African Judo Championships	2nd	Heavyweight (+100 kg)
2000	African Judo Championships	2nd	Heavyweight (+100 kg)
1999	All-Africa Games	2nd	Heavyweight (+100 kg)
1998	African Judo Championships	1st	Heavyweight (+100 kg)
