= Josoa Razafimahatratra =

Malagasy footballer

Personal information
- Date of birth: 7 February 1980 (age 46)
- Position: Midfielder

Senior career*
Years	Team	Apps	(Gls)
2003–2007	Léopards de Transfoot		

International career
2003–2004	Madagascar	2	(0)
- * Club domestic league appearances and goals

Josoa Razafimahatratra (born 7 February 1980) is a Malagasy retired football midfielder.
