= West Iqiebor =

Nigerian judoka

Personal information
- Nationality: Nigerian
- Born: 1 October 1964 (age 60)

Sport
- Sport: Judo

West Iqiebor (born 1 October 1964) is a Nigerian judoka. He competed in the men's middleweight event at the 1988 Summer Olympics.
