= Philippe Aubert (judoka) =

Swiss judoka

Personal information
- Nationality: Swiss
- Born: 4 September 1943 (age 81)
- Occupation: Judoka

Sport
- Sport: Judo

Philippe Aubert (born 4 September 1943) is a Swiss judoka. He competed in the men's middleweight event at the 1972 Summer Olympics.
