= Lutz Lischka =

Austrian judoka (1944–2024)

Personal information
- Born: 30 January 1944 Vienna, Reichsgau Wien, Germany
- Died: 14 January 2024 (aged 79)
- Occupation: Judoka
- Website: lutzlischka.com

Sport
- Country: Austria
- Sport: Judo
- Weight class: ‍–‍80 kg

Achievements and titles
- Olympic Games: 5th (1972)
- World Champ.: R16 (1971)
- European Champ.: R32 (1969)

Profile at external databases
- IJF: 54514
- JudoInside.com: 5674

Lutz Lischka (30 January 1944 – 14 January 2024) was an Austrian judoka. He competed in the men's middleweight event at the 1972 Summer Olympics. Lischka died on 14 January 2024, at the age of 79.
