= Selma Gräfin von der Gröben =

German feminist and philanthropist

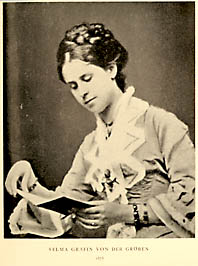
Selma von der Gröben, 1878

Selma Gräfin von der Gröben (1856–1938), was a German feminist and philanthropist. She is known for her work for women's rights within the religious circles, is regarded as pioneer in social work and was involved in a number of social organisations. She was the chairperson of the Deutscher Evangelischer Frauenbund.
