= Chicmah Obodo =

Nigerian judoka

Personal information
- Full name: Chicmah Obodo
- Nationality: Nigeria
- Born: Nigeria

Sport
- Sport: Judo
- Event: 70 kg
Medal record
Women's judo
Representing Nigeria
All-Africa Games
Bronze medal – third place	1999 Johannesburg	70 kg

Chicmah Obodo is a Nigerian judoka who competed in the women's category. She won a bronze medal at the 1999 All-Africa Games in the –70 kg category.

== Sports career ==
In 1999, she participated in the All-Africa Games held in Johannesburg, South Africa. She won a bronze medal in the women's 70kg event.
