= Petr Jákl (judoka, born 1941) =

Czech judoka

Personal information
- Nationality: Czech
- Born: 16 December 1941 (age 83)

Sport
- Sport: Judo

Petr Jákl Sr. (born 16 December 1941) is a Czech judoka. He competed in the men's middleweight event at the 1972 Summer Olympics. His son, Petr, also competed at the 2000 Summer Olympics.
