= Suleman Musa =

Nigerian judoka (born 1973)

Personal information
- Nationality: Nigerian
- Born: 15 June 1973 (age 52)

Sport
- Sport: Judo

Suleman Musa (born 15 June 1973) is a Nigerian judoka. He competed at the 1992 Summer Olympics and the 1996 Summer Olympics.
