= Petr Jákl =

Czech actor, director, producer, stuntman, and judo fighter (born 1973)

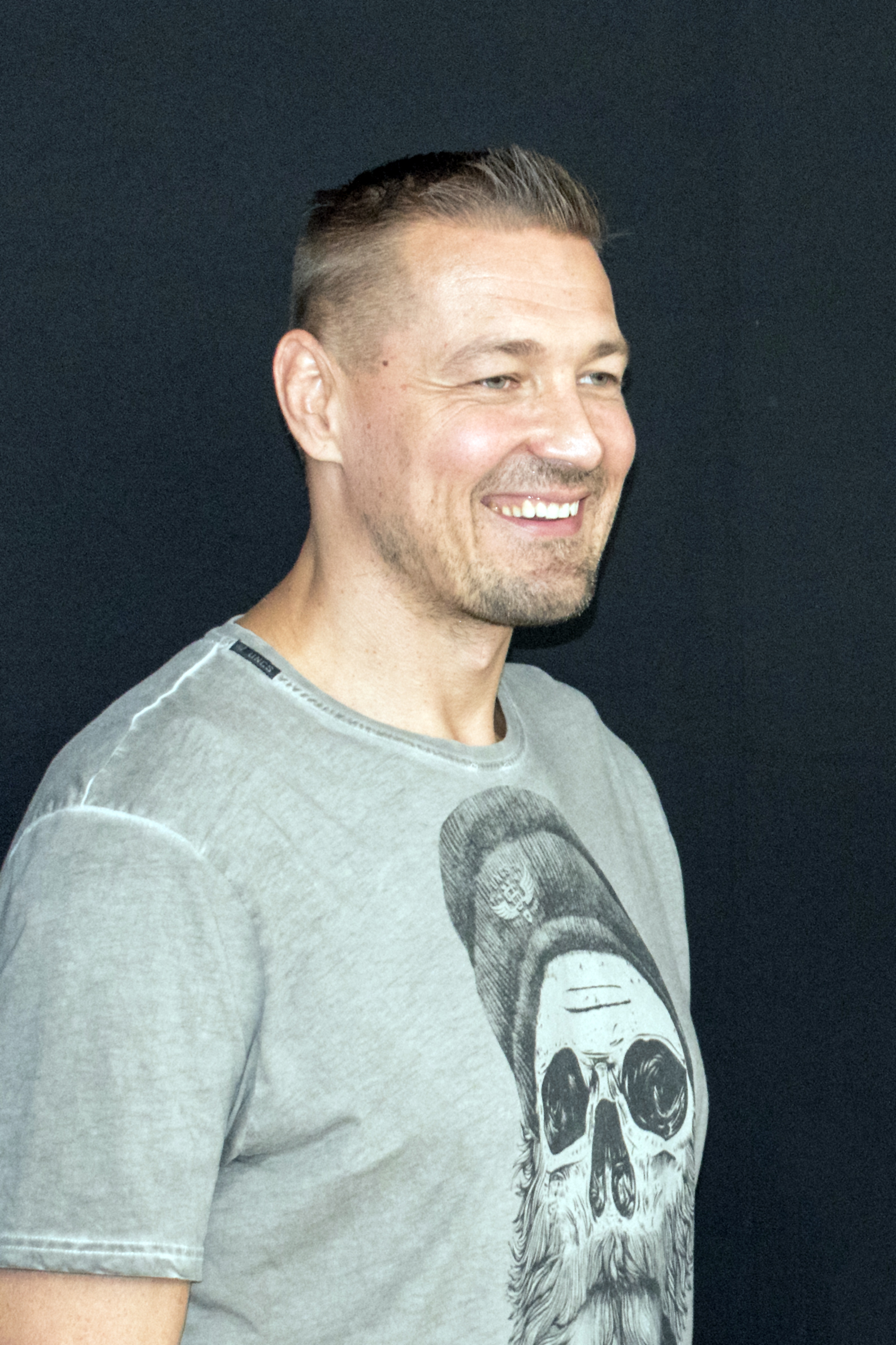
- Jákl in 2018
- Born: 14 September 1973 (age 53); Prague, Czechia
- Years active: 1999–present
- Spouse(s): Romana Jákl Vítová (2007–present)

Petr Jákl Jr. (born 14 September 1973) is a Czech actor, director, producer, former stuntman and a judo fighter. His father Petr Jákl Sr is an Olympic judo fighter, stuntman, and producer.

== Judo achievements ==
| Year | Tournament | Place | Weight class |
|---|---|---|---|
| 1993 | European Judo Championships Junior | 5th | Half heavyweight (95 kg) |
| 1994 | World University Championships | 3rd | Half heavyweight (95 kg) |
| 1995 | European Judo Championships | 7th | Half heavyweight (95 kg) |
| 1995 | Fukuoka World University Games | 5th | Half heavyweight (95 kg) |
| 1997 | World Judo Championships | participant | Half heavyweight (100 kg) |
| 1998 | World Cup | 1st | Half heavyweight (100 kg) |
| 1998 | European Judo Championships | 5th | Half heavyweight (100 kg) |
| 1998 | World University Championships | 3rd | Half heavyweight (95 kg) |
| 1999 | World Judo Championships | 13th | regardless of weight |
| 2000 | World Cup | 3rd | Half heavyweight (100 kg) |
| 2000 | European Judo Championships | 7th | Heavyweight (+100 kg) |
| 2000 | Olympic Games (Sydney) | 13th | Heavyweight (+100 kg) |

== Filmography ==
=== As actor ===
Film

- 1999 Nebát se a nakrást
- 2001 Jak ukrást Dagmaru
- 2002 Bad Company as Darius
- 2002 XXX as Kolya
- 2003 Men of Action (Short) as Action Star
- 2003 Krysar as Pied Piper
- 2004 Eurotrip as Gunter
- 2004 Alien vs. Predator as Stone
- 2005 Pterodactyl as Tezo
- 2005 Born Into Shit as Mr. Hrana
- 2008 Bathory as Bald Hunchback
- 2010 Kajínek
- 2013 Revival

=== Video games ===
2018 Kingdom Come: Deliverance as Runt (visual representation only)

=== As director ===
- 2010 Kajínek - Action drama film
- 2015 Ghoul – Horror film
- 2022 Medieval – Action historical drama
