= Jonas Cissé =

Senegalese judoka

Personal information
- Nationality: Senegalese
- Born: 14 April 1940 (age 85)

Sport
- Sport: Judo

Jonas Cissé (born 14 April 1940) is a Senegalese judoka. He competed in the men's middleweight event at the 1972 Summer Olympics.
