= Isidore Silas =

Cameroonian judoka (born 1951)

Personal information
- Nationality: Cameroonian
- Born: 17 March 1951 (age 74)

Sport
- Sport: Judo

Isidore Silas (born 17 March 1951) is a Cameroonian judoka. He competed in the men's heavyweight event at the 1984 Summer Olympics.
