= Alexander von der Groeben =

German judoka (born 1955)

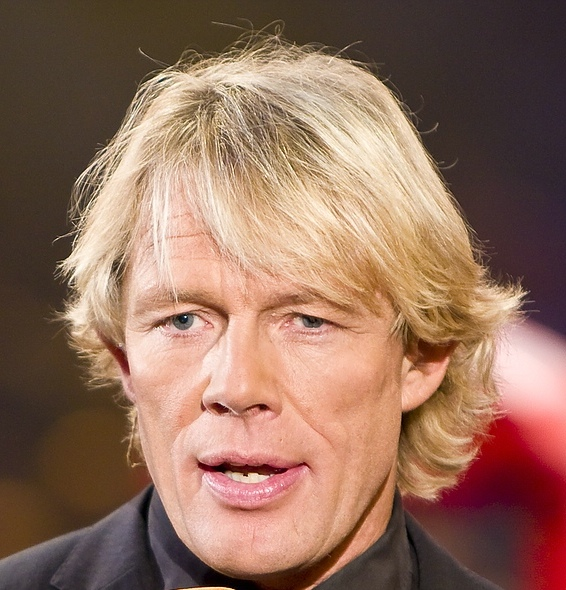
- Alexander von der Groeben in 2008

Personal information
- Full name: Sigurd Alexander Adalbert Graf von der Groeben
- Born: 5 October 1955 (age 70) Ratingen, Germany
- Occupation: Judoka

Sport
- Country: West Germany
- Sport: Judo
- Weight class: +95 kg, Open

Achievements and titles
- Olympic Games: QF (1984)
- World Champ.: (bronze) (1989)
- European Champ.: (gold) (1984, 1985)
Medal record
Men's judo
Representing West Germany
World Championships
Bronze medal – third place	1989 Belgrade	Open
European Championships
Gold medal – first place	1984 Liege	+95 kg
Gold medal – first place	1985 Hamar	Open
Silver medal – second place	1985 Hamar	+95 kg
Silver medal – second place	1988 Pamplona	+95 kg
Bronze medal – third place	1981 Debrecen	+95 kg
Bronze medal – third place	1983 Paris	+95 kg
Bronze medal – third place	1987 Paris	+95 kg
Bronze medal – third place	1990 Frankfurt	Open

Profile at external databases
- IJF: 57413
- JudoInside.com: 4811
- Updated on 9 July 2024

Sigurd Alexander Adalbert Graf von der Groeben (born 5 October 1955) is a German former judoka. He competed at the 1984 Summer Olympics and the 1988 Summer Olympics.

== Early life and ancestry ==
Born into an old von der Groeben family, once part of German nobility, he is the son of Johann-Albrecht Graf von der Groeben (b. 1922) and his second wife, Ingeborg Baumeister (b. 1931).

== Personal life ==
In 1991, he married Ulrike Elfes. They have a son and a daughter, both actors:

- Maximilian Alexander Graf von der Groeben (b. 1992)
- Carolin Gräfin von der Groeben (b. 1995)
