= Khalif Diouf =

Senegalese judoka (born 1958)

Personal information
- Nationality: Senegalese
- Born: 24 March 1958 (age 68)

Sport
- Sport: Judo

Khalif Diouf (born 24 March 1958) is a Senegalese judoka. He competed at the 1984 Summer Olympics and the 1992 Summer Olympics.
