= Fodil Goumrassa =

Algerian judoka (1952–2023)

- Born: 30 May 1952; Algiers, French Algeria
- Died: 2 July 2023 (aged 71); Algiers, Algeria
- Occupation: Judoka

Fodil Goumrassa (30 May 1952 – 2 July 2023) was an Algerian judoka.

== Biography ==
Born in Algiers, Goumrassa earned a bronze medal in the under-86 kg category at the 1973 All-Africa Games in Lagos. At the 1973 World Judo Championships in Lausanne, he was eliminated in the round of 16 in the under-80 kg category by the Yugoslav Slavko Obadov. He won the gold medal in the under-95 kg category at the 1978 All-Africa Games in Algiers.

Goumrassa died at the Mustapha Pacha hospital on 2 July 2023, at the age of 71.
