= Oh Seung-lip =

South Korean judoka

Personal information
- Born: 6 October 1946 (age 79)
- Occupation: Judoka

Korean name
- Hangul: 오승립
- RR: O Seungrip
- MR: O Sŭngnip

Sport
- Country: South Korea
- Sport: Judo
- Weight class: ‍–‍80 kg

Achievements and titles
- Olympic Games: (silver) (1972)
- World Champ.: (bronze) (1969)
Medal record
Men's judo
Representing South Korea
Olympic Games
Silver medal – second place	1972 Munich	‍–‍80 kg
World Championships
Bronze medal – third place	1969 Mexico City	‍–‍80 kg
Summer Universiade
Silver medal – second place	1967 Tokyo	‍–‍80 kg

Profile at external databases
- IJF: 54518
- JudoInside.com: 6104
- Updated on 22 June 2023

Oh Seung-Lip (Korean: 오승립; born 6 October 1946) is a Korean former judoka who competed in the 1972 Summer Olympics. He won a bronze medal at the 1969 World Judo Championships.
