= Püreviin Dagvasüren =

Mongolian wrestler and judoka (1943–2014)

Püreviin Dagvasüren (Mongolian: Пүрэвийн Дагвасүрэн; June 13, 1943 – September 19, 2014) was a Mongolian traditional wrestler with the top rank of "lion". He also participated in the 1972 Summer Olympics as a heavyweight Judoka, but did not win any medal. He was born in Batsümber.

The IOC database incorrectly lists Dagvasüren as bronze medalist in the freestyle wrestling welterweight category at the 1968 Summer Olympics in Mexico. In reality, that medal was taken home by fellow Mongolian wrestler Tömöriin Artag.
