= Slim Agrebi =

Tunisian judoka (born 1974)

Personal information
- Nationality: Tunisian
- Born: 12 January 1974 (age 51)

Sport
- Sport: Judo

Slim Agrebi (born 12 January 1974) is a Tunisian judoka. He competed in the men's heavyweight event at the 1996 Summer Olympics.
