= Marguerita Goua Lou =

Ivorian judoka

Personal information
- Nationality: Ivorian
- Born: 31 May 1970 (age 55)

Sport
- Sport: Judo

Marguerita Goua Lou (born 31 May 1970) is an Ivorian judoka. She competed in the women's heavyweight event at the 1996 Summer Olympics.
