= Ulrike von der Groeben =

German television sport journalist

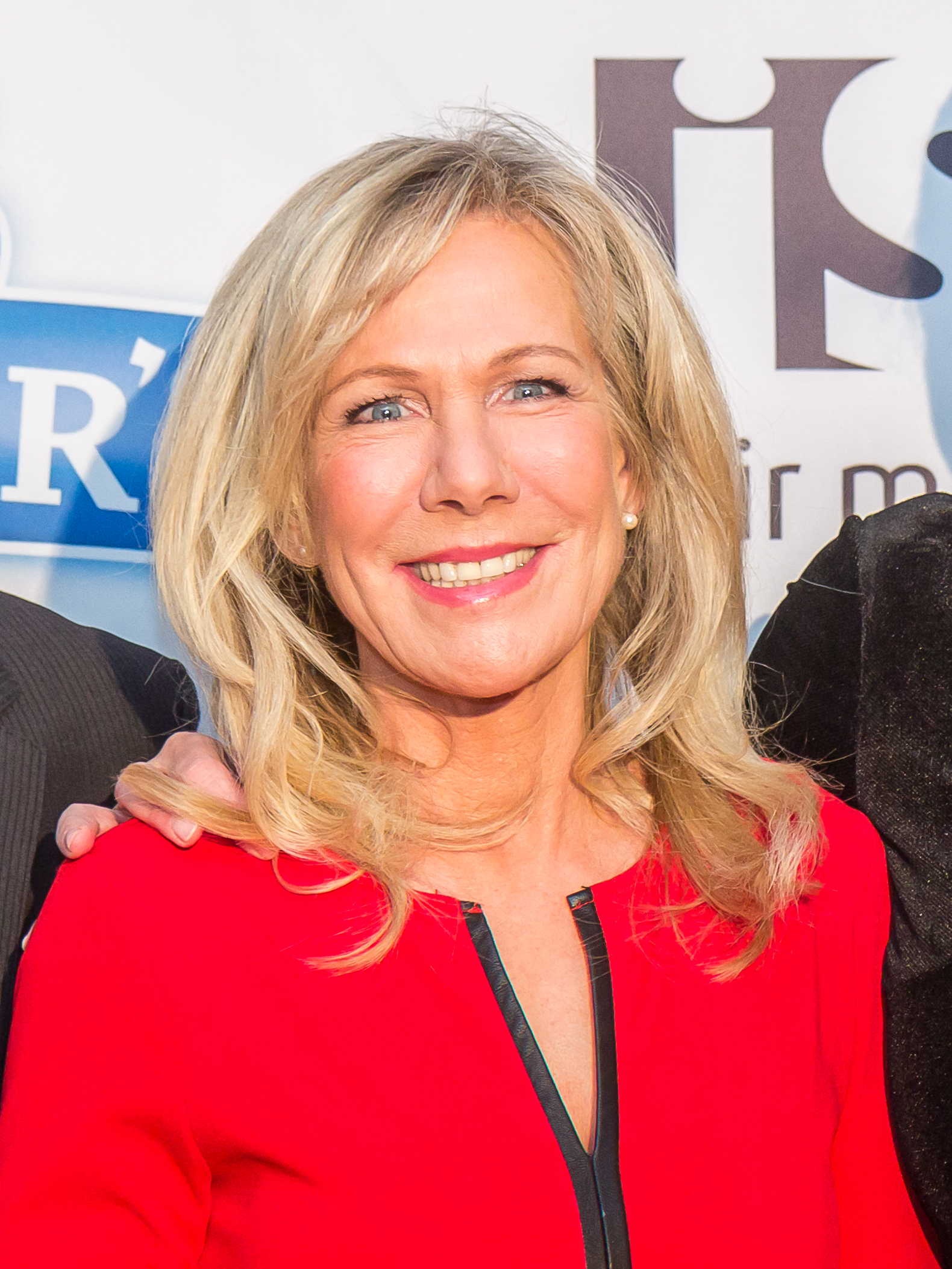
Ulrike von der Groeben in Cologne (2017)

Ulrike von der Groeben, Ulrike Elfes (born 25 March 1957 in Mönchengladbach) is a German television sport journalist.

== Life ==
Von der Groeben works at German television broadcaster RTL as sport journalist. Von der Groeben is married to Alexander von der Groeben and has two children, Max and Caroline.
