= Boubker Slimani =

Moroccan judoka (born 1952)

Personal information
- Nationality: Moroccan
- Born: 3 June 1952 (age 73)

Sport
- Sport: Judo

Boubker Slimani (born 3 June 1952) is a Moroccan judoka. He competed in the men's middleweight event at the 1972 Summer Olympics.
