= Faycal Bousbiat =

Algerian judoka

Personal information
- Nationality: Canadian
- Born: 13 July 1970 (age 55)
- Occupation: Judoka

Sport
- Country: Algeria/Canada
- Sport: Judo
Medal record
Men's judo
Representing Algeria
Mediterranean Games
Bronze medal – third place	1993 Languedoc-Roussillon	–60 kg
Representing Canada
Pan American Championships
Silver medal – second place	2000 Orlando	–66 kg
Representing Quebec
Francophone Games
Bronze medal – third place	2001 Ottawa	–66 kg

Profile at external databases
- IJF: 9179
- JudoInside.com: 2427

Faycal Bousbiat (born 13 July 1970) is a Canadian judoka. He formerly represented Algeria.

He is now a coach.

== Achievements ==
Year	Tournament	Place	Result	Event
Representing Algeria
1993	Mediterranean Games	Languedoc-Roussillon, France	3rd	Extra lightweight (60 kg)
Representing Canada
2000	Pan American Championships	Orlando, United States	2nd	Half-lightweight (66 kg)
Representing Quebec
2001	Francophone Games	Ottawa, Canada	3rd	Half-lightweight (66 kg)

== See also ==
- Judo in Canada
