= Douglas Nelson =

American judoka (born 1959)

Douglas 'Doug' Nelson (born May 28, 1959) judoka. Nelson was on the 1984 US Olympic team for judo.
