= Khalifa Diouf =

Senegalese judoka (born 1968)

Personal information
- Nationality: Senegalese
- Born: 24 March 1968 (age 58)

Sport
- Sport: Judo

Khalifa Ababacar Diouf (born 24 March 1968) is a Senegalese former judoka. He competed in the men's heavyweight event at the 1996 Summer Olympics.
