= Tijini Ben Kassou =

Moroccan judoka (1950–2016)

Personal information
- Nationality: Moroccan
- Born: 2 December 1950
- Died: 2016 (aged 65–66)

Sport
- Sport: Judo

Tijini Ben Kassou (2 December 1950 – 2016) was a Moroccan judoka. He competed in the men's heavyweight event at the 1972 Summer Olympics.
