= Adijat Ayuba =

Nigerian judoka

Personal information
- Nationality: Nigeria
- Born: 11 October 1983 (age 42) Nigeria

Sport
- Sport: Judo
- Event: 78 kg
Medal record
Women's judo
Representing Nigeria
All-Africa Games
Silver medal – second place	2007 Alger	78kg

Adijat Ayuba (born 11 October 1983) is a Nigerian judoka who compete in the women's category. She won a silver medal at the 2007 All-Africa Games and a bronze medal at the 2010 African Judo Championships.

== Judo ==
Adijat Ayuba won a silver medal in the women's 78 kg event, at the 2007 All-Africa Games held in Algiers, Algeria.

While at the 2010 African Judo Championships at Yaoundé, Cameroon, she came second in the Open event and earned a bronze medal.
