= Abdel Hakim Harkat =

Algerian judoka (born 1968)

Personal information
- Nationality: Algerian
- Born: 4 July 1968 (age 57)
- Occupation: Judoka

Sport
- Sport: Judo

Profile at external databases
- IJF: 53360
- JudoInside.com: 1839

Abdel Hakim Harkat (born 4 July 1968) is an Algerian judoka. He competed at the 1992 Summer Olympics and the 1996 Summer Olympics.
