= Venezuela at the 2000 Summer Olympics =

- IOC code: VEN
- NOC: Venezuelan Olympic Committee
- Website: cov.com.ve (in Spanish)

in Sydney
- Competitors: 50 (36 men, 14 women) in 17 sports
- Flag bearer: Adriana Carmona
- Medals: Gold 0 Silver 0 Bronze 0 Total 0

Summer Olympics appearances (overview)
- 1948; 1952; 1956; 1960; 1964; 1968; 1972; 1976; 1980; 1984; 1988; 1992; 1996; 2000; 2004; 2008; 2012; 2016; 2020; 2024; 2028

Venezuela was represented at the 2000 Summer Olympics in Sydney, New South Wales, Australia by the Venezuelan Olympic Committee.

In total, 50 athletes including 36 men and 14 women represented Venezuela in 17 different sports including athletics, boxing, cycling, diving, fencing, gymnastics, judo, sailing, shooting, swimming, sychronized swimming, table tennis, taekwondo, tennis, triathlon, weightlifting and wrestling.

== Competitors ==
In total, 50 athletes represented Venezuela at the 2000 Summer Olympics in Sydney, New South Wales, Australia across 17 different sports.

Sport	Men	Women	Total
Athletics	6	0	6
Boxing	4	–	4
Cycling	4	1	5
Diving	2	1	3
Fencing	1	0	1
Gymnastics	0	1	1
Judo	6	2	8
Sailing	1	0	1
Shooting	1	1	2
Swimming	5	0	5
Synchronized swimming	–	2	2
Table tennis	0	2	2
Taekwondo	0	1	1
Tennis	2	2	4
Triathlon	1	0	1
Weightlifting	1	1	2
Wrestling	2	–	2
Total	36	14	50

== Athletics ==
In total, six Venezuelan athletes participated in the athletics events – José Carabalí, Juan Morillo, Hely Ollarves and José Peña in the men's 4 × 100 m relay and José Alejandro Semprún and Carlos Tarazona in the men's marathon.

Athlete	Event	Heat		Semifinal		Final	
Athlete	Event	Result	Rank	Result	Rank	Result	Rank
José Carabalí; Juan Morillo; Hely Ollarves; José Peña	4 × 100 m relay	39.45 s	20	Did not advance			
Carlos Tarazona	Marathon	—N/a				2:20:39	40
José Alejandro Semprún	Marathon	—N/a				3:00:02	79

== Boxing ==
In total, four Venezuelan athletes participated in the boxing events – Nehomar Cermeño in the bantamweight category, Patrick López in the lightweight category, José Luis Varela in the light flyweight category and Hely Yánes in the light middleweight category.

Athlete	Event	Round of 32	Round of 16	Quarterfinals	Semifinals	Final	
Athlete	Event	Opposition Result	Opposition Result	Opposition Result	Opposition Result	Opposition Result	Rank
José Luis Varela	Light flyweight	M. Romero (CUB); L 11–15	Did not advance				
Nehomar Cermeño	Bantamweight	R. Durgahed (MRI); W 16–4	A. Agaguloglu (TUR); L 3-11	Did not advance			
Patrick López	Lightweight	N. Schuster (GER); W 24–10	A. Maletin (RUS); L RSC	Did not advance			
Hely Yánes	Light middleweight	N. Kasenov (KGZ); W 20–12	Y. Ibraimov (KAZ); L RSC	Did not advance			

== Cycling ==
In total, five Venezuelan athletes participated in the cycling events – Manuel Guevara, Carlos Maya, Alexis Méndez and Omar Pumar in the men's road race and Daniela Larreal in the women's sprint and the women's time trial.

=== Road Cycling ===
Athlete	Event	Time	Rank
Omar Pumar	Men's road race	5:30:46	50
Manuel Guevara	Men's road race	5:42:43	83
Carlos Maya	Men's road race	5:42:43	84
Alexis Méndez	Men's road race	5:52:47	88

=== Track Cycling ===
Sprint

Athlete	Event	Qualification		Round 1	Repechage 1	Quarterfinals	Semifinals	Final	
Athlete	Event	Time Speed (km/h)	Rank	Opposition Time Speed (km/h)	Opposition Time Speed (km/h)	Opposition Time Speed (km/h)	Opposition Time Speed (km/h)	Opposition Time Speed (km/h)	Rank
Daniela Larreal	Women's sprint	11.526 (62.467)	5	T Lindenmuth (USA); W	N/A	M Ferris (AUS)L	Did not advance	Classification 5-8; S Szabolcsi (HUN); T Lindenmuth (USA); T Dubnicoff (CAN); L	8

Time trial

Athlete	Event	Time	Rank
Daniela Larreal	Women's time trial	35.728	10

== Diving ==
In total, three Venezuelan athletes participated in the diving events – Alejandra Fuentes in the women's 3 m springboard, Ramón Fumadó in the men's 3 m springboard and Luis Villarroel in the men's 3 m springboard and the men's 10 m platform.

Athlete	Event	Preliminaries		Semifinals		Final	
Athlete	Event	Points	Rank	Points	Rank	Points	Rank
Ramón Fumadó	Men's 3 m springboard	343.89	28	Did not advance			
Luis Villarroel	Men's 3 m springboard	365.97	21	Did not advance			
Luis Villarroel	Men's 10 m platform	309.66	35	Did not advance			
Alejandra Fuentes	Women's 3 m springboard	219.81	37	Did not advance			

== Fencing ==
In total, one Venezuelan athlete participated in the fencing events – Carlos Rodríguez in the men's foil.

Athlete	Event	Round of 64	Round of 32	Round of 16	Quarterfinal	Semifinal	Final / BM	
Athlete	Event	Opposition Score	Opposition Score	Opposition Score	Opposition Score	Opposition Score	Opposition Score	Rank
Carlos Rodríguez	Men's foil	Bye	I. Mamedov (RUS); W 15–14	S. Sanzo (ITA); L 7-15	Did not advance			

== Gymnastics ==
In total, one Venezuelan athletes participated in the gymnastic events – Arlen Lovera in the women's individual all-around, the women's floor, the women's vault, the women's uneven bars and the women's balance beam .

Athlete	Event	Qualification						Final					
Athlete	Event	Apparatus				Total	Rank	Apparatus				Total	Rank
Athlete	Event	F	V	UB	BB	Total	Rank	F	V	UB	BB	Total	Rank
Arlen Lovera	All-around	9.087	9.362	9.300	8.575	36.324	50	Did not advance					

== Judo ==
In total, eight Venezuelan athletes participated in the judo events – Reiver Alvarenga in the men's –60 kg category, Jackelin Díaz in the Women's –52 kg category, Xiomara Griffith in the Women's –70 kg category, Luís Gregorio López in the men's –100 kg category, Luis René López in the men's –90 kg category, Eduardo Manglés in the men's –73 kg category, Hermágoras Manglés in the men's –81 kg category and Ludwig Ortíz in the men's –66 kg category.

Athlete	Event	Round of 64	Round of 32	Round of 16	Quarterfinals	Semifinals	Repechage	Final / BM	
Athlete	Event	Opposition Result	Opposition Result	Opposition Result	Opposition Result	Opposition Result	Opposition Result	Opposition Result	Rank
Reiver Alvarenga	Men's –60 kg	Bye	D. Narmandakh (MGL); L	Did not advance					
Ludwig Ortíz	Men's –66 kg	Bye	P. Caravana (POR); L	Did not advance					
Eduardo Manglés	Men's –73 kg	Bye	M. Almeida (POR); L	Did not advance					
Hermágoras Manglés	Men's –81 kg	Bye	Kwak O. (PRK); L	Did not advance					
Luis René López	Men's –90 kg	—N/a	C. Santiago (PUR); L	Did not advance					
Luís Gregorio López	Men's –100 kg	Bye	D. Gowing (NZL); L	Did not advance					
Jackelin Díaz	Women's –52 kg	—N/a	I. Aluaş (ROU); L	Did not advance					
Xiomara Griffith	Women's –70 kg	—N/a	Y. Scapin (ITA); L	Did not advance					

== Sailing ==
In total, one Venezuelan athlete participated in the sailing events – Yamil Saba Fuentes in the Men's mistral.

Athlete	Event	Race											Net points	Final rank
Athlete	Event	1	2	3	4	5	6	7	8	9	10	11	Net points	Final rank
Yamil Saba Fuentes	Mistral	18	30	~~37~~	15	20	29	~~34~~	32	24	10	22	200	27

== Shooting ==
In total, two Venezuelan athletes participated in the shooting events – Felipe Beuvrín in the men's 10 m air pistol and the men's 50 m pistol and María Gabriela Franco in the women's 10 m air pistol and the women's 25 m pistol.

Athlete	Event	Qualification		Final	
Athlete	Event	Points	Rank	Points	Rank
Felipe Beuvrín	Men's 10 m air pistol	569	30	Did not advance	
Felipe Beuvrín	Men's 50 m pistol	542	34	Did not advance	
María Gabriela Franco	Women's 10 m air pistol	366	39	Did not advance	
María Gabriela Franco	Women's 25 m pistol	563	37	Did not advance	

== Swimming ==
In total, five Venezuelan athletes participated in the swimming events – Ricardo Monasterio, Francisco Páez, Oswaldo Quevedo, Francisco Sánchez and Carlos Santander.

Athlete	Event	Heat		Semifinal		Final	
Athlete	Event	Time	Rank	Time	Rank	Time	Rank
Francisco Sánchez	50 m freestyle	DNS		Did not advance			
Francisco Sánchez	100 m freestyle	52.43	50	Did not advance			
Francisco Páez	200 m freestyle	1:54.32	35	Did not advance			
Ricardo Monasterio	400 m freestyle	3:55.35	23	—N/a		Did not advance	
Ricardo Monasterio	1,500 m freestyle	15:17.00	15	—N/a		Did not advance	
Francisco Sánchez	100 m butterfly	54.56	29	Did not advance			
Oswaldo Quevedo	100 m butterfly	55.55	39	Did not advance			
Carlos Santander; Oswaldo Quevedo; Francisco Páez; Francisco Sánchez	4 × 100 m freestyle relay	3:24.64	17	—N/a		Did not advance	

== Synchronized swimming ==
In total, two Venezuelan athletes participated in the synchronized swimming events – Jenny Castro Bravo and Virginia Ruiz in the duet.

Athlete	Event	Qualification				Final			
Athlete	Event	Technical	Free	Total	Rank	Technical	Free	Total	Rank
Jenny Castro Bravo; Virginia Ruiz	Duet	29.750	54.036	83.786	21	Did not advance			

== Table tennis ==
In total, one Venezuelan athlete participated in the table tennis events – Fabiola Ramos in the women's singles.

Athlete	Event	Group round		Round of 32	Round of 16	Quarterfinals	Semifinals	Final / BM	
Athlete	Event	Opposition Result	Rank	Opposition Result	Opposition Result	Opposition Result	Opposition Result	Opposition Result	Rank
Fabiola Ramos	Women's singles	Group K Chen-Tong F. (TPE); L 0 – 3 O. Kovtun (UKR); L 0-3	3	Did not advance					

== Taekwondo ==
In total, one Venezuelan athlete participated in the taekwondo events – Adriana Carmona in the women's +67 kg.

Athlete	Event	Preliminary round	Quarterfinals	Semifinals	Repechage	Final / BM	
Athlete	Event	Opposition Result	Opposition Result	Opposition Result	Opposition Result	Opposition Result	Rank
Adriana Carmona	Women's +67 kg	Bye	M Baverel (FRA); W 8–3	Chen Z (CHN); L 6–8	D Bosshart (CAN); L 8–9	Did not advance	

== Tennis ==
In total, four Venezuelan athletes participated in the tennis events – José de Armas, Milagros Sequera, Jimy Szymanski and María Alejandra Vento.

Athlete	Event	Round of 64	Round of 32	Round of 16	Quarterfinal	Semifinal	Final / BM
Athlete	Event	Opposition Score	Opposition Score	Opposition Score	Opposition Score	Opposition Score	Rank
José de Armas; Jimy Szymanski	Men's doubles	—N/a	M. Ančić / G. Ivanišević (CRO); W 6–2, 7–6^{(7–3)}	S. Lareau / D. Nestor (CAN); L 3–6, 4–6	Did not advance		
María Alejandra Vento	Men's doubles	Women's singles	A. Hopmans (NED); W 6–3, 6–3	S. Appelmans (BEL); L 2–6, 2–6	Did not advance		
María Alejandra Vento; Milagros Sequera	Men's doubles	Women's doubles	—N/a	E. Gagliardi / M. Vavrinec (SUI); W 6–2, 7–5	L. Montalvo / P. Suárez (ARG); W 6–4, 6–1	E. Callens / D. van Roost (BEL); L 6–4, 5–7, 4–6	Did not advance

== Triathlon ==
In total, one Venezuelan athletes participated in the triathlon events – Gilberto González in the men's competition.

Athlete	Event	Swimming	Cycling	Running	Total Time	Rank
Gilberto González	Men's	18:54.49	58:40.40	34:38.14	1:52:13.03	37

== Weightlifting ==
In total, two Venezuelan athletes participated in the weightlifting events – Karla Fernández in the women's –53 kg category and Julio Luna in the men's –94 kg.

Athlete	Event	Snatch		Clean & Jerk		Total	Rank
Athlete	Event	Result	Rank	Result	Rank	Total	Rank
Julio Luna	Men's –94 kg	177,5	9	215	8	392,5	8
Karla Fernández	Women's –53 kg	80	8	95	9	175	9

== Wrestling ==
In total, two Venezuelan athletes participated in the wrestling events – Rafael Barreno in the Greco-Roman –130 kg category and Eddy Bartolozzi in the Greco-Roman –85 kg category.

Key:
- VT – Victory by Fall.
- PP – Decision by Points – the loser with technical points.
- PO – Decision by Points – the loser without technical points.

Athlete	Event	Group round		Quarterfinals	Semifinals	Final / BM	
Athlete	Event	Opposition Result	Rank	Opposition Result	Opposition Result	Opposition Result	Rank
Eddy Bartolozzi	–85 kg	Group 5 A Olczak (AUS); W 3-0 PO; M Lidberg (SWE); L 1-3 PP; S Bárdosi (HUN); L 0–3 PO	3	Did not advance			11
Rafael Barreno	–130 kg	Group 3 G Saldadze (UKR); L 0-3 PO; L Kovacs (AUS)W 3-0 PO	2	Did not advance			12

== See also ==
- Venezuela at the 1999 Pan American Games
