= Latvia at the 2000 Summer Olympics =

- IOC code: LAT
- NOC: Latvian Olympic Committee
- Website: www.olimpiade.lv (in Latvian and English)

in Sydney
- Competitors: 45 (30 men, 15 women) in 13 sports
- Flag bearer: Voldemārs Lūsis
- Medals Ranked 44th: Gold 1 Silver 1 Bronze 1 Total 3

Summer Olympics appearances (overview)
- 1924; 1928; 1932; 1936; 1948–1988; 1992; 1996; 2000; 2004; 2008; 2012; 2016; 2020; 2024

Other related appearances
- Russian Empire (1908–1912); Soviet Union (1952–1988)

Latvia competed at the 2000 Summer Olympics in Sydney, Australia. Latvia won their first summer Olympic gold medal at these games. 45 competitors, 30 men and 15 women, took part in 47 events in 13 sports.

== Medalists ==
Medal	Name	Sport	Event
Gold	Igors Vihrovs	Gymnastics	Men's floor exercises
Silver	Aigars Fadejevs	Athletics	Men's 50 km walk
Bronze	Vsevolods Zeļonijs	Judo	Men's lightweight

== Athletics ==
Men
Track & road events

Athlete	Event	Heat		Quarterfinal		Semifinal		Final	
Athlete	Event	Result	Rank	Result	Rank	Result	Rank	Result	Rank
Uģis Brūvelis	50 km walk	—N/a						4:11:41	35
Aigars Fadejevs	20 km walk	—N/a						1:22:43	14
Aigars Fadejevs	50 km walk	—N/a						3:43:40	
Viktors Lācis	800 m	1:46.94	3 q	—N/a		1:47.24	6	Did not advance	
Modris Liepiņš	50 km walk	—N/a						3:48:36	9
Staņislavs Olijars	110 m hurdles	13.56	2 Q	13.34	3 Q	13.50	4	Did not advance	
Māris Putenis	20 km walk	—N/a						DQ	AC

Field events

Athlete	Event	Qualification		Final	
Athlete	Event	Distance	Position	Distance	Position
Voldemārs Lūsis	Javelin throw	80.08	18	Did not advance	
Ēriks Rags	Javelin throw	75.75	26	Did not advance	

Women
Track & road events

Athlete	Event	Heat		Quarterfinal		Semifinal		Final	
Athlete	Event	Result	Rank	Result	Rank	Result	Rank	Result	Rank
Jeļena Čelnova-Prokopčuka	5000 m	15:09.45	4 Q	—N/a				14:55.46	9
Jeļena Čelnova-Prokopčuka	10000 m	32:32.87	8 Q	—N/a				32:17.72	19
Jolanta Dukure	20 km walk	—N/a						1:36.54	30
Irina Latve	800 m	2:06:05	29	Did not advance					
Anita Liepiņa	20 km walk	—N/a						1:39.17	37
Anita Trumpe	100 m hurdles	13.77	33	Did not advance					
Irēna Žauna	400 m hurdles	57.79	23	Did not advance					

Field events

Athlete	Event	Qualification		Final	
Athlete	Event	Distance	Position	Distance	Position
Valentīna Gotovska	Long jump	6.47	19	Did not advance	
Līga Kļaviņa	High Jump	NM	AC	Did not advance	
Inga Kožarenoka	Javelin Throw	53.83	30	Did not advance	

== Canoeing ==
=== Sprint ===
Men

Athlete	Event	Heats		Repechages		Semifinals		Final	
Athlete	Event	Time	Rank	Time	Rank	Time	Rank	Time	Rank
Jefimijs Klementjevs	C-1 1000 m	3:58.840	4 QS	—N/a		4:01.300	2 Q	4:00.931	7

== Cycling ==
=== Road ===
Athlete	Event	Time	Rank
Raivis Belohvoščiks	Men's road race	DNF	
Raivis Belohvoščiks	Men's time trial	59:57	15
Andris Naudužs	Men's road race	DNF	
Dainis Ozols	Men's road race	DNF	
Dainis Ozols	Men's time trial	1:00:46	21
Arvis Piziks	Men's road race	5:30:46	22
Andris Reiss	Men's road race	5:42:01	81

=== Track ===
1000m time trial

Athlete	Event	Time	Rank
Gvido Miezis	Men's 1000m time trial	1:08.113	16

Men's Sprint

Athlete	Event	Qualifying round		1/16	1/16 repechage	1/8 final	1/8 repechage	Classification 9–12	Quarter-finals	Classification 5–8	Semi-finals	Finals	
Athlete	Event	Time	Rank	Rank	Rank	Rank	Rank	Rank	Rank	Rank	Rank	Time	Rank
Viesturs Bērziņš	Men's sprint	10.343	5 Q	Ota (JPN); W 11.008	BYE	van Eijden (GER); L 10.682	MacLean (GBR); Arrue (USA); L	Buráň (CZE); Arrue (USA); Hill (AUS); L	Did not advance				10

Team sprint

Athlete	Event	Qualification		First round		Final	
Athlete	Event	Time Speed (km/h)	Rank	Opposition Time Speed (km/h)	Rank	Opposition Time Speed (km/h)	Rank
Viesturs Bērziņš; Ainārs Ķiksis; Ivo Lakučs	Men's team sprint	45.589; 59.225	6 Q	Australia; L 46.625; 58.033	8	Did not advance	

Men's Keirin

Athlete	Event	First round		First repechage		Second round		Finals	
Athlete	Event	Time	Rank	Time	Rank	Time	Rank	Time	Rank
Ainārs Ķiksis	Men's keirin	DNF		AC	1 Q	DNF		Did not advance	

== Fencing ==
One female fencer represented Latvia in 2000.

Women

Athlete	Event	Round of 64	Round of 32	Round of 16	Quarterfinal	Semifinal	Final / BM	
Athlete	Event	Opposition Score	Opposition Score	Opposition Score	Opposition Score	Opposition Score	Opposition Score	Rank
Jūlija Vansoviča	Women's épée	Bravo (CHI); W 15–5	Szalay-Horváth (HUN); W 15–13	Nagy (HUN); L 10–15	Did not advance			16

== Gymnastics ==
Men

Athlete	Event	Qualification								Final							
Athlete	Event	Apparatus						Total	Rank	Apparatus						Total	Rank
Athlete	Event	F	PH	R	V	PB	HB	Total	Rank	F	PH	R	V	PB	HB	Total	Rank
Igors Vihrovs	Floor Exercise	9.662 Q	8.462	9.375	9.587	9.500	9.600	56.186	26 Q	9.812	—N/a					9.812	

== Judo ==
Men

Athlete	Event	Preliminary	Round of 32	Round of 16	Quarterfinals	Semifinals	Repechage 1	Repechage 2	Repechage 3	Final / BM	
Athlete	Event	Opposition Result	Opposition Result	Opposition Result	Opposition Result	Opposition Result	Opposition Result	Opposition Result	Opposition Result	Opposition Result	Rank
Vsevolods Zeļonijs	−73 kg	BYE	Laraque (HAI); W 1001–0000	Shturbabin (UZB); W 1010–0000	Maddaloni (ITA); L 0001–0011	—N/a	BYE	Moussa (TUN); W 1000–0010	Kheder (FRA); W 1110–0100	Yong-sin (KOR); W 1000–0000	

== Modern pentathlon ==
Athlete	Event	Shooting (10 m air pistol)			Fencing (épée one touch)			Swimming (200 m freestyle)			Riding (show jumping)			Running (3000 m)			Total points	Final rank
Athlete	Event	Points	Rank	MP Points	Time	Rank	MP points	Wins	Rank	MP points	Penalties	Rank	MP points	Time	Rank	MP Points	Total points	Final rank
Deniss Čerkovskis	Men's	174	19	1024	6	24	600	2:12.04	19	1180	133	12	967	9:27.35	7	1132	4903	18
Jeļena Rubļevska	Women's	169	18	964	15	2	960	2:29.07	20	1110	145	14	955	11:04.81	8	1062	5051	8

== Rowing ==
Men

Athlete	Event	Heats		Repechage		Semifinals C-D		Semifinals		Final	
Athlete	Event	Time	Rank	Time	Rank	Time	Rank	Time	Rank	Time	Rank
Andris Reinholds	Single sculls	7:06.28	3 R	7:06.40	1 SA/B	—N/a		7:15.04	4 FB	DQ	AC

== Sailing ==
Women

Athlete	Event	Race											Net points	Final rank
Athlete	Event	1	2	3	4	5	6	7	8	9	10	M*	Net points	Final rank
Vita Matīse	Mistral	18	19	17	22	20	13	23	18	20	~~24~~	~~23~~	170.0	22
Žaklīna Litauniece	Europe	24	~~26~~	~~27~~	26	24	20	24	25	24	26	25	218	27

== Shooting ==
Men

Athlete	Event	Qualification		Final	
Athlete	Event	Score	Rank	Score	Rank
Afanasijs Kuzmins	25 m rapid fire pistol	585	6 Q	681.3	8
Boriss Timofejevs	Skeet	122	12	Did not advance	

== Swimming ==
Men

Athlete	Event	Heat		Semifinal		Final	
Athlete	Event	Time	Rank	Time	Rank	Time	Rank
Artūrs Jakovļevs	100 m butterfly	56.63	56	Did not advance			
Valērijs Kalmikovs	100 m breaststroke	1:04.02	34	Did not advance			
Valērijs Kalmikovs	200 m breaststroke	2:16.21	19	Did not advance			
Valērijs Kalmikovs	200 m individual medley	2:04.18	24	Did not advance			

Women

Athlete	Event	Heat		Semifinal		Final	
Athlete	Event	Time	Rank	Time	Rank	Time	Rank
Margarita Kalmikova	200 m breaststroke	2:35.69	28	Did not advance			
Agnese Ozoliņa	50 m freestyle	27.28	44	Did not advance			
Agnese Ozoliņa	100 m freestyle	59.28	45	Did not advance			

== Weightlifting ==
Men

Athlete	Event	Snatch		Clean & Jerk		Total	Rank
Athlete	Event	Result	Rank	Result	Rank	Total	Rank
Sergejs Lazovskis	−94 kg	155.0	18	200.0	16	355.0	18
Raimonds Bergmanis	+105 kg	~~180~~	DNF	—	—	—	DNF
Viktors Ščerbatihs	+105 kg	202.5	5	250.0	6	452.5	6

== Wrestling ==
Men's freestyle

Athlete	Event	Elimination Pool				Quarterfinal	Semifinal	Final / BM	
Athlete	Event	Opposition Result	Opposition Result	Opposition Result	Rank	Opposition Result	Opposition Result	Final round Result	Rank
Igors Samušonoks	−85 kg	Justin Abdou (CAN); L 2–3	Yoel Romero (CUB); L 0–3	Magomed Kurugliyev (KAZ); W 7–6	3	Did not advance			11

== Notes ==
- Wallechinsky, David (2004). The Complete Book of the Summer Olympics (Athens 2004 Edition). Toronto, Canada. ISBN 1-894963-32-6.
- International Olympic Committee (2001). The Results. Retrieved 12 November 2005.
- Sydney Organising Committee for the Olympic Games (2001). Official Report of the XXVII Olympiad Volume 1: Preparing for the Games. Retrieved 20 November 2005.
- Sydney Organising Committee for the Olympic Games (2001). Official Report of the XXVII Olympiad Volume 2: Celebrating the Games. Retrieved 20 November 2005.
- Sydney Organising Committee for the Olympic Games (2001). The Results. Retrieved 20 November 2005.
- International Olympic Committee Web Site
