= Judo at the 2000 Summer Olympics – Men's 73 kg =

Judo competition

Men's 73 kg at the Games of the XXVII Olympiad
- Venue: Sydney Convention and Exhibition Centre
- Date: 18 September 2000
- Competitors: 34 from 34 nations

Medalists
1st place, gold medalist(s)		Giuseppe Maddaloni	Italy
2nd place, silver medalist(s)		Tiago Camilo	Brazil
3rd place, bronze medalist(s)		Anatoly Laryukhov	Belarus
3rd place, bronze medalist(s)		Vsevolods Zeļonijs	Latvia

Men's 73 kg competition in judo at the 2000 Summer Olympics was held on 18 September at the Sydney Convention and Exhibition Centre.

This event was the third-lightest of the men's judo weight classes, limiting competitors to a maximum of 73 kilograms of body mass. Like all other judo events, bouts lasted five minutes. If the bout was still tied at the end, it was extended for another five-minute, sudden-death period; if neither judoka scored during that period, the match is decided by the judges. The tournament bracket consisted of a single-elimination contest culminating in a gold medal match. There was also a repechage to determine the winners of the two bronze medals. Each judoka who had lost to a semifinalist competed in the repechage. The two judokas who lost in the semifinals faced the winner of the opposite half of the bracket's repechage in bronze medal bouts.

== Schedule ==
All times are Australian Eastern Daylight Time (UTC+11:00)

Date	Time	Round
Monday, 18 September 2000	15:00; 20:30	Preliminaries & Repechage; Final

== Tournament results ==
=== Final ===
Final
1	Tiago Camilo (BRA)	0000
2	Giuseppe Maddaloni (ITA)	1002

=== Mat 1 ===
First round matches

	Score	
Choi Yong-sin (KOR)	1001–0000	Sagdat Sadykov (KGZ)

Elimination rounds

Round of 32
Claudiu Baștea (ROM)	0010
Kenzo Nakamura (JPN)	0110
Christoph Stangl (AUT)	0000
Jarosław Lewak (POL)	1000
Jimmy Pedro (USA)	0001
Choi Yong-sin (KOR)	0010
Andrew Payne (BAR)	0010
Sebastian Alquati (ARG)	1010
Carlos Méndez (PUR)	0000
Miklós Illyés (HUN)	0200
Michel Almeida (POR)	0200
Eduardo Manglés (VEN)	0011
Kouami Sacha Denanyoh (TOG)	0000
Noureddine Yagoubi (ALG)	0210
Tiago Camilo (BRA)	1010
Gil Offer (ISR)	0100

Round of 16
Kenzo Nakamura (JPN)	1001
Jarosław Lewak (POL)	0000
Choi Yong-sin (KOR)	0110
Sebastian Alquati (ARG)	0001
Miklós Illyés (HUN)	0000
Michel Almeida (POR)	1002
Noureddine Yagoubi (ALG)	0010
Tiago Camilo (BRA)	1110

Quarterfinals
Kenzo Nakamura (JPN)	0001
Choi Yong-sin (KOR)	1010
Michel Almeida (POR)	0101
Tiago Camilo (BRA)	0101

Semifinals
Choi Yong-sin (KOR)	0001
Tiago Camilo (BRA)	1000

=== Mat 2 ===
First round matches

	Score	
Hector Lombard (CUB)	1010–0000	Haitham Awad (EGY)

Elimination rounds

Round of 32
Giorgi Revazishvili (GEO)	0011
Andrey Shturbabin (UZB)	1001
Vsevolods Zeļonijs (LAT)	1001
Ernst Laraque (HAI)	0000
Giuseppe Maddaloni (ITA)	0201
Travolta Waterhouse (SAM)	0000
Martin Schmidt (GER)	0001
Hassen Moussa (TUN)	0010
Gennadiy Bilodid (UKR)	1010
Hector Lombard (CUB)	0020
Vitaliy Makarov (RUS)	0011
Askhat Shakharov (KAZ)	1010
Germán Velasco (PER)	1020
Thomas Hill (AUS)	0010
Ferrid Kheder (FRA)	0010
Anatoly Laryukhov (BLR)	1000

Round of 16
Andrey Shturbabin (UZB)	0000
Vsevolods Zeļonijs (LAT)	1010
Giuseppe Maddaloni (ITA)	1000
Hassen Moussa (TUN)	0000
Gennadiy Bilodid (UKR)	0222
Askhat Shakharov (KAZ)	0010
Germán Velasco (PER)	0010
Anatoly Laryukhov (BLR)	1000

Quarterfinals
Vsevolods Zeļonijs (LAT)	0001
Giuseppe Maddaloni (ITA)	0011
Gennadiy Bilodid (UKR)	0100
Anatoly Laryukhov (BLR)	1000

Semifinals
Giuseppe Maddaloni (ITA)	1000
Anatoly Laryukhov (BLR)	0010

=== Repechage ===
The losing semifinalists as well as those judoka eliminated in earlier rounds by the four semifinalists of the main bracket advanced to the repechage. These matches determined the two bronze medalists for the event.

First round matches

Since 23 judoka qualified for the repechage, one match was held to reduce the field to 22.

	Score	
Sagdat Sadykov (KGZ)	0001–1101	Jimmy Pedro (USA)

Elimination rounds

First round
Jimmy Pedro (USA)	0202
Sebastian Alquati (ARG)	0001
Gil Offer (ISR)	0010
Noureddine Yagoubi (ALG)	0110
Travolta Waterhouse (SAM)	0000
Hassen Moussa (TUN)	1020
Ferrid Kheder (FRA)	0001
Germán Velasco (PER)	0001

Second round
Jimmy Pedro (USA)	0200
Kenzo Nakamura (JPN)	0010
Noureddine Yagoubi (ALG)	0002
Michel Almeida (POR)	0100
Hassen Moussa (TUN)	0010
Vsevolods Zeļonijs (LAT)	1000
Ferrid Kheder (FRA)	1011
Gennadiy Bilodid (UKR)	0110

Third round
Jimmy Pedro (USA)	1000
Michel Almeida (POR)	0000
Vsevolods Zeļonijs (LAT)	1110
Ferrid Kheder (FRA)	0100

Bronze medal finals
Jimmy Pedro (USA)	0000
Anatoly Laryukhov (BLR)	1000
Choi Yong-sin (KOR)	0000
Vsevolods Zeļonijs (LAT)	1000
