= Peru at the 2000 Summer Olympics =

- IOC code: PER
- NOC: Peruvian Olympic Committee
- Website: www.coperu.org (in Spanish)

in Sydney
- Competitors: 21 (8 men and 13 women) in 7 sports
- Flag bearer: Rosa García
- Medals: Gold 0 Silver 0 Bronze 0 Total 0

Summer Olympics appearances (overview)
- 1900; 1904–1932; 1936; 1948; 1952; 1956; 1960; 1964; 1968; 1972; 1976; 1980; 1984; 1988; 1992; 1996; 2000; 2004; 2008; 2012; 2016; 2020; 2024

Peru was represented at the 2000 Summer Olympics in Sydney, New South Wales, Australia by the Peruvian Olympic Committee.

In total, 21 athletes including eight men and 13 women represented Peru in seven different sports including athletics, diving, judo, sailing, shooting, swimming and volleyball.

Volleyball player Rosa García was the flagbearer.

== Competitors ==
In total, 21 athletes represented Peru at the 2000 Summer Olympics in Sydney, New South Wales, Australia across seven different sports.

Sport	Men	Women	Total
Athletics	1	1	2
Diving	1	0	1
Judo	1	0	1
Sailing	1	0	1
Shooting	2	0	2
Swimming	2	1	3
Volleyball	0	11	11
Total	8	13	21

== Athletics ==
In total, two Peruvian athletes participated in the athletics events – Hugo Muñoz in the men's high jump and Maria Portillo in the women's marathon.

Men

Athlete	Event	Qualification		Final	
Athlete	Event	Result	Rank	Result	Rank
Hugo Muñoz	High jump	NM		Did not advance	

Women

Athlete	Event	Heat		Quarterfinal		Semifinal		Final	
Athlete	Event	Result	Rank	Result	Rank	Result	Rank	Result	Rank
Maria Portillo	Marathon	—						2:36:50	32

== Diving ==
In total, one Peruvian athlete participated in the diving events – Abel Sánchez in the men's 3 m springboard and the men's 10 m platform.

Athlete	Event	Preliminary		Semifinal				Final		Total	
Athlete	Event	Points	Rank	Points	Rank	Total	Rank	Points	Rank	Points	Rank
Abel Sánchez	3 m springboard	356.40	24	Did not advance							
Abel Sánchez	10 m platform	295.14	37	Did not advance							

== Judo ==
In total, one Peruvian athlete participated in the judo events – Germán Velasco in the men's –73 kg category.

Athlete	Event	First round	Round of 32	Round of 16	Quarterfinal	Semifinal	Repechage 1	Repechage 2	Repechage 3	Repechage 4	Final / BM	
Athlete	Event	Opposition Result	Opposition Result	Opposition Result	Opposition Result	Opposition Result	Opposition Result	Opposition Result	Opposition Result	Opposition Result	Opposition Result	Rank
Germán Velasco	–73 kg	Bye	Hill (AUS); W 1020–0010	Laryukhov (BLR); L 0010–1000	Did not advance		Kheder (FRA); L 0001–0001	Did not advance				

== Sailing ==
In total, one Peruvian athlete participated in the sailing events – Luis Alberto Olcese in the laser.

Athlete	Event	Race											Net points	Rank
Athlete	Event	1	2	3	4	5	6	7	8	9	10	11	Net points	Rank
Luis Alberto Olcese	Laser	36	37	21	DSQ; ~~44~~	15	30	37	~~38~~	11	31	35	253	33

== Shooting ==
In total, two Peruvian athletes participated in the shooting events – Francisco Boza in the men's trap and Juan Giha in the men's skeet.

Athlete	Event	Qualification		Final	
Athlete	Event	Points	Rank	Total	Rank
Francisco Boza	Trap	108	=26	Did not advance	
Juan Giha	Skeet	110	49	Did not advance	

== Swimming ==
In total, three Peruvian athletes participated in the swimming events – Talía Barrios in the women's 50 m freestyle, Luis López Hartinger in the men's 50 m freestyle and Juan Pablo Valdivieso in the men's 200 m butterfly.

Men

Athlete	Events	Heat		Semifinal		Final	
Athlete	Events	Time	Rank	Time	Rank	Time	Rank
Luis López Hartinger	50 m freestyle	24.00	49	Did not advance			
Juan Pablo Valdivieso	200 m butterfly	2:03.67	36	Did not advance			

Women

Athlete	Events	Heat		Semifinal		Final	
Athlete	Events	Time	Rank	Time	Rank	Time	Rank
Talía Barrios	50 m freestyle	28.11	56	Did not advance			

== Volleyball ==
In total, 11 Peruvian athletes participated in the volleyball events – Fiorella Aita, Milagros Cámere, Leyla Chihuán, Iris Falcón, Rosa García, Elena Keldibekova, Natalia Málaga, Milagros Moy, Diana Soto, Milagros Uceda, Janet Vasconzuelo and Yulissa Zamudio in the women's indoor tournament.

== See also ==
- Peru at the 1999 Pan American Games
