= Portugal at the 2000 Summer Olympics =

- IOC code: POR
- NOC: Olympic Committee of Portugal
- Website: www.comiteolimpicoportugal.pt (in Portuguese)

in Sydney
- Competitors: 61 (48 men and 13 women) in 13 sports
- Flag bearer: Miguel Maia (Beach Volleyball)
- Medals Ranked 69th: Gold 0 Silver 0 Bronze 2 Total 2

Summer Olympics appearances (overview)
- 1912; 1920; 1924; 1928; 1932; 1936; 1948; 1952; 1956; 1960; 1964; 1968; 1972; 1976; 1980; 1984; 1988; 1992; 1996; 2000; 2004; 2008; 2012; 2016; 2020; 2024; 2028

Portugal competed at the 2000 Summer Olympics in Sydney, Australia.

A delegation of 61 competitors participated in 13 sports, winning two Olympic bronze medals in the judo and athletics. Fernanda Ribeiro, the 10000m champion from Atlanta'96 and in her fourth consecutive Olympics, couldn't keep her title away from the previous holder Derartu Tulu but still managed to reach the podium. The first Portuguese medal in the judo was achieved by Nuno Delgado in the 81 kg category.

A much smaller delegation competed at these antipodean Games explaining the reduction in the athletics and swimming teams. Nevertheless, Portuguese archery and tennis had their third consecutive Olympic presence. But, as with badminton, these competitors were all eliminated in the first round (the tennis male team was beaten again by a bahamese team). Sailing provided good results with some finalists (5–8th) in distinct classes. Beach volleyball was again represented by the same Atlanta'96 fourth-placed male team. It was an almost a remake, as they faced some of the same adversaries, were beaten by an American team in the semi-finals and lost the chance to grab the bronze medal.

== Medalists ==
Medal	Name	Sport	Event	Date
Bronze	Nuno Delgado	Judo	Men's 81 kg	19 September
Bronze	Fernanda Ribeiro	Athletics	Women's 10000 m	30 September

== Results by event ==
=== Archery ===
Athlete	Event	Ranking round		Round of 64	Round of 32	Round of 16	Quarterfinals	Semifinals	Finals / BM	
Athlete	Event	Score	Seed	Opposition Score	Opposition Score	Opposition Score	Opposition Score	Opposition Score	Opposition Score	Rank
Nuno Pombo	Men's individual	572	59	Petersson (SWE) (6); L 146–165	did not Advance					60

=== Athletics ===
Key

- Note – Ranks given for track events are within the athlete's heat only
- Q = Qualified for the next round
- q = Qualified for the next round as a fastest loser or, in field events, by position without achieving the qualifying target
- NR = National record
- N/A = Round not applicable for the event
- Bye = Athlete not required to compete in round

Men
Track & road events

Athlete	Event	Heat		Quarterfinal		Semifinal		Final	
Athlete	Event	Result	Rank	Result	Rank	Result	Rank	Result	Rank
João Pires	800 m	1:47.61	5	—N/a		did not Advance			
Rui Silva	1500 m	3:41.93	14	—N/a		did not Advance			
Hélder Ornelas	5000 m	14:29.01	17	—N/a				did not Advance	
José Ramos	10.000 m	27:56.30	10 q	—N/a				28:07.43	14
Pedro Rodrigues	400 m hurdles	49.90	4 q	—N/a		49.48	7	did not Advance	
Manuel Silva	3000 m steeplechase	8:25.70	5 q	—N/a				8:38.63	13
António Pinto	Marathon	—N/a						2:15:17	11
Domingos Castro	Marathon	—N/a						2:16:52	18
Luís Novo	Marathon	—N/a						2:23:04	50
João Vieira	20 km walk	—N/a						did not Start	
Pedro Martins	50 km walk	—N/a						4:08:13	33

Field events

Athlete	Event	Qualification		Final	
Athlete	Event	Distance	Position	Distance	Position
Vitor Costa	Hammer Throw	68.89	18	did not Advance	
Carlos Calado	Long Jump	8.04	4 q	7.94	10
João André	Pole Vault	5.40	16	did not Advance	
Nuno Fernandes	Pole Vault	5.25	15	did not Advance	

Combined events – Decathlon

Athlete	Event	100 m	LJ	SP	HJ	400 m	110H	DT	PV	JT	1500 m	Final	Rank
Mário Anibal	Result	10.97	6,90	15,39	2,03	48.71	14.71	45,01	4,90	57,51	4:32.68	8136	12
Mário Anibal	Points	867	790	814	831	875	885	767	880	700	727	8136	12

Women
Track & road events

Athlete	Event	Heat		Quarterfinal		Semifinal		Final	
Athlete	Event	Result	Rank	Result	Rank	Result	Rank	Result	Rank
Carla Sacramento	1500 m	4:08.41	5 Q	—N/a		4:07.65	5 Q	4:11.15	10
Ana Dias	10.000 m	33:21.69	12	—N/a				did not Advance	
Fernanda Ribeiro	10.000 m	32:06.43	—N/a				3 Q	30:22.88	3rd place, bronze medalist(s)
Ana Dias	Marathon	—N/a						2:32:29	21
Susana Feitor	20 km walk	—N/a						1:33:53	14

Field events

Athlete	Event	Qualification		Final	
Athlete	Event	Distance	Position	Distance	Position
Teresa Machado	Discus Throw	55.65	13 q	59.50	11

=== Badminton ===
Athlete	Event	Round of 64	Round of 32	Round of 16	Quarterfinals	Semifinals	Finals / BM	
Athlete	Event	Opposition Score	Opposition Score	Opposition Score	Opposition Score	Opposition Score	Opposition Score	Rank
Marco Vasconcelos	Men's singles	—N/a	Gallet (FRA); L 15–7 15–8	Did Not Advance				

=== Canoeing ===
==== Slalom ====
Athlete	Event	Qualifying						Final					
Athlete	Event	Run 1	Rank	Run 2	Rank	Total	Rank	Run 1	Rank	Run 2	Rank	Total	Rank
Florence Ferreira Fernandes	Women's K-1	227.65	20	162.10	17	389.75	20	did not Advance					

=== Cycling ===
==== Road ====
Men

Athlete	Event	Time	Rank
Vítor Gamito	Time Trial	1:03:16	35
Vítor Gamito	Road Race	did not finish	
Bruno Castanheira	Road Race	did not finish	
José Azevedo	Road Race	did not finish	
Orlando Rodrigues	Road Race	did not finish	

=== Equestrian ===
==== Dressage ====
Athlete	Horse	Event	Grand Prix		Grand Prix Special		Grand Prix Freestyle		Overall	
Athlete	Horse	Event	Score	Rank	Score	Rank	Score	Rank	Score	Rank
Daniel Pinto	Weldon Surpris	Individual	65.28	27	did not Advance					

=== Fencing ===
One male fencer represented Portugal in 2000.

Athlete	Event	Round of 64	Round of 32	Round of 16	Quarterfinals	Semifinals	Finals / BM	
Athlete	Event	Opposition Score	Opposition Score	Opposition Score	Opposition Score	Opposition Score	Opposition Score	Rank
João Gomes	Men's foil	Bye	Ludwig (AUT); W 15–12	Bissdorf (GER); L 15–11	Did Not Advance			

=== Judo ===
Men

Athlete	Event	Preliminary round	Round of 32	Round of 16	Quarterfinals	Semifinals	Repechage 1	Repechage 2	Repechage 3	Final / BM	
Athlete	Event	Opposition score	Opposition score	Opposition score	Opposition score	Opposition score	Opposition score	Opposition score	Opposition score	Opposition score	Rank
Pedro Caravana	-66 kg	Bye	Ortiz (VEN); W	Vazagashvili (GEO); L	did not advance						
Michel Almeida	-73 kg	Bye	Magles (VEN); W	Illyés (HUN); W	Camilo (BRA); L	Bye		Yagoubi (ALG); W	Pedro (USA); L	did not Advance	
Nuno Delgado	-81 kg	Vatrican (MON); W	Lepre (ITA); W	Kelly (AUS); W	Sarikhani (IRI); W	Cho (KOR); L	Bye			Paseyro (URU); W	3rd place, bronze medalist(s)
Pedro Soares	-100 kg	Bye	Elgharbawy (EGY); W	Gill (CAN); L	did not advance		Sonnemans (NED); L	did not advance			

Women

Athlete	Event	Preliminary round	Round of 32	Round of 16	Quarterfinals	Semifinals	Repechage 1	Repechage 2	Repechage 3	Final / BM	
Athlete	Event	Opposition score	Opposition score	Opposition score	Opposition score	Opposition score	Opposition score	Opposition score	Opposition score	Opposition score	Rank
Filipa Cavalleri	-57 kg	—N/a	Bye	Cavazzuti (ITA); L	did not Advance						
Sandra Godinho	-78 kg	—N/a	Silva (BRA); L	did not Advance							

=== Sailing ===
Men's events

Athlete	Event	Race											Net points	Rank
Athlete	Event	1	2	3	4	5	6	7	8	9	10	11	Net points	Rank
João Rodrigues	Mistral	9	25	~~DNF~~	7	3	20	~~28~~	19	15	7	23	129	18
Álvaro Marinho; Miguel Nunes	470	1	4	6	7	5	9	5	15	~~25~~	15	~~16~~	67	5

Women's events

Athlete	Event	Race											Net points	Rank
Athlete	Event	1	2	3	4	5	6	7	8	9	10	11	Net points	Rank
Joana Pratas	Europe	9	20	~~21~~	~~24~~	11	14	16	20	19	15	17	141	21

Open events

Athlete	Event	Race											Net points	Rank
Athlete	Event	1	2	3	4	5	6	7	8	9	10	11	Net points	Rank
Gustavo Lima	Laser	6	22	4	2	3	18	11	7	~~44~~	10	~~34~~	83	6
Hugo Rocha; Nuno Barreto	Tornado	13	14	15	13	15	16	~~17~~	~~17~~	14	9	13	122	16

Athlete	Event	Race																Net points	Rank
Athlete	Event	1	2	3	4	5	6	7	8	9	10	11	12	13	14	15	16	Net points	Rank
Afonso Domingos; Diogo Cayolla	49er	7	~~13~~	3	6	8	~~13~~	3	4	13	11	8	3	4	11	4	8	93	7

=== Shooting ===
Men

Athlete	Event	Qualification		Final	
Athlete	Event	Points	Rank	Points	Rank
João Costa	Men's 10 m air pistol	581	5 Q	679.4	7
João Costa	Men's 50 m pistol	548	27	did not advance	
Custódio Ezequiel	Men's Trap	111	18	did not advance	
João Rebelo	Men's Trap	108	26	did not advance	

=== Swimming ===
Men's 50m Freestyle:

- Pedro Silva

- Heats (heat 7) – 23.27 (→ 8th, did not advance – 36th overall)

Men's 200m Freestyle:

- Ricardo Pedroso

- Heats (heat 4) – 1:52.60 (→ 3rd, did not advance – 25th overall)

Men's 100m Butterfly:

- Simão Morgado

- Heats (heat 4) – 54.75 (→ 1st, did not advance – 30th overall)

Men's 100m Breaststroke:

- José Couto

- Heats (heat 8) – 1:02.79 (→ 7th, did not advance – 18th overall)

Men's 200m Breaststroke:

- José Couto

- Heats (heat 7) – 2:18.08 (→ 7th, did not advance – 26th overall)

Men's 100m Backstroke:

- Nuno Laurentino

- Heats (heat 4) – 56.95 (→ 5th, did not advance – 28th overall)

Men's 200m Backstroke:

- Mário Carvalho

- Heats (heat 2) – 2:03.82 (→ 2nd, did not advance – 30th overall)

Women's 200m Butterfly:

- Raquel Felgueiras

- Heats (heat 2) – 2:15.19 (→ 5th, did not advance – 27th overall)

=== Tennis ===
Athlete	Event	Round of 64	Round of 32	Round of 16	Quarterfinals	Semifinals	Final / BM	
Athlete	Event	Opposition Score	Opposition Score	Opposition Score	Opposition Score	Opposition Score	Opposition Score	Rank
Bernardo Mota; Nuno Marques	Men's doubles	Knowles / Merklein (BAH); L 6–7, 6–4, 7–5	did not advance					

=== Volleyball ===
==== Beach ====
Athlete	Event	Preliminary round	Preliminary elimination		Round of 16	Quarterfinals	Semifinals	Final / BM	
Athlete	Event	Opposition Score	Opposition Score	Opposition Score	Opposition Score	Opposition Score	Opposition Score	Opposition Score	Rank
João Brenha; Miguel Maia	Men's	Maaseide – Kvalheim (NOR); W 15–3	Bye		Esteban – Conde (ARG); W 15–3	P. Laciga – M. Laciga (SUI); W 15–11	Blanton – Fonoimoana (USA); L 15–12	Hager – Ahmann (GER); L 12–9, 12–6	4
Ana Cristina Pereira; Maria José Schuller	Women's	Rong – Xiong (CHN); L 15–5	Samuel – Pires (BRA); L 15–6	did not Advance					=19

== Officials ==
- Manuel Marques da Silva (chief of mission)

== Notes ==
- Sydney Organising Committee for the Olympic Games (2001). Official Report of the XXVII Olympiad – Volume 2: Celebrating the Games. (Retrieved 14 November 2006).
- Sydney Organising Committee for the Olympic Games (2001). Official Report of the XXVII Olympiad – Volume 3: The Results. (Retrieved 14 November 2006).
- International Olympic Committee – Olympic medal winners database
