= Travolta Waterhouse =

Samoan judoka

Personal information
- Full name: Travolta Paparino Waterhouse
- Nationality: Samoan
- Born: 19 September 1978 (age 46)
- Weight: 73 kg (161 lb)

Sport
- Sport: Judo

Travolta Paparino Waterhouse (born 19 September 1978) is a Samoan former judoka. He competed in the men's lightweight event at the 2000 Summer Olympics. Waterhouse first faced the eventual gold medalist Giuseppe Maddaloni of Italy in the first round of competition but lost the bout. In the repechage round, Waterhouse was paired with Hassen Moussa of Tunisia but once again lost the bout and didn't proceed through to the final stages. Waterhouse's overall final placing was joint-thirteenth.
