= Noureddine Yagoubi =

Algerian judoka (born 1974)

Nourrdine Yagoubi
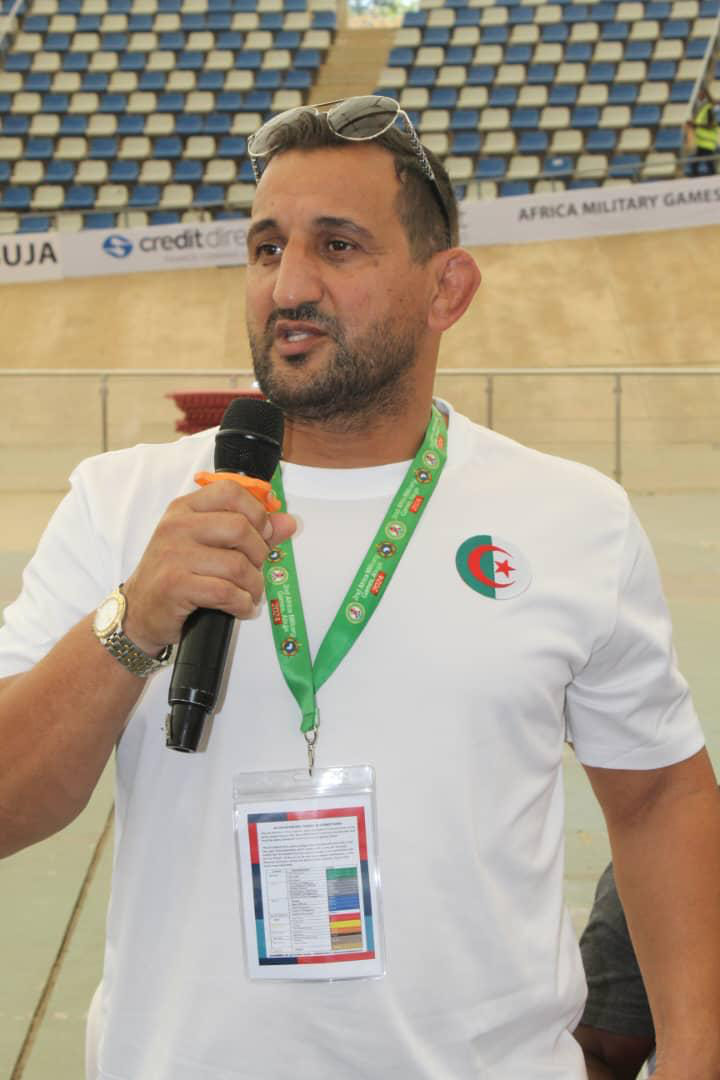
- Noureddine Yagoubi in 2024

Personal information
- Nationality: Algerian
- Born: 8 January 1974 (age 52)
- Occupation: Judoka
- Height: 1.70 m (5 ft 7 in)
- Weight: 73 kg (161 lb)

Sport
- Country: Algeria
- Sport: Judo
- Event: Men's 73 kg
Medal record
Men's judo
All-Africa Games
Bronze medal – third place	1999 Johannesburg	73 kg
Bronze medal – third place	2001 Tunis	73 kg
Bronze medal – third place	2005 Almería	73 kg

Profile at external databases
- IJF: 11176
- JudoInside.com: 1849

Noureddine Yagoubi (born 8 January 1974) is an Algerian judoka who ended his athletic career in 2009 to become a full-time coach.

Yagoubi represented Algeria at the 2000 Summer Olympics in Sydney and the 2004 Summer Olympics in Athens. In Sydney he competed in the Men's 73 kg weight category. Yagoubi's first bout was against Kouami Sacha Denanyoh of Togo, this bout Yagoubi was the victor. In the second round of competition, Yagoubi faced eventual silver medalists Tiago Camilo of Brazil, this bout Yagoubi lost but he was later put through to the repechages. Yagoubi's first repechage bout was against Israel's Gil Offer and Yougabi won, proceeding to the next round. In his second repechage bout, Yagoubi lost to Michel Almeida of Portugal, and this was his final bout of the Games.

At the 2004 Summer Olympics Yagoubi participated once more in the Men's 73 kg weight category. Yagoubi won his first bout against Akapei Latu of Samoa 1111–0000. But in the second round he was paired up to Ukraine's Gennadiy Bilodid, this bout Yagoubi lost 0000–1000. This time round Yagoubi didn't proceed through to the repechage rounds.

== Achievements ==
Year	Tournament	Place	Weight class
2005	Mediterranean Games	3rd	Lightweight (73 kg)
2004	African Judo Championships	2nd	Lightweight (73 kg)
2002	African Judo Championships	2nd	Lightweight (73 kg)
2001	African Judo Championships	1st	Lightweight (73 kg)
2001	Mediterranean Games	3rd	Lightweight (73 kg)
2000	African Judo Championships	1st	Lightweight (73 kg)
1999	All-Africa Games	3rd	Lightweight (73 kg)
1998	African Judo Championships	3rd	Lightweight (73 kg)
1997	African Judo Championships	1st	Lightweight (71 kg)
