= Sagdat Sadykov =

Olympic judoka

Personal information
- Full name: Sagdat Kabirovich Sadykov
- Nationality: Kyrgyzstan; Kazakhstan
- Born: 29 July 1973 (age 52) Oskemen, Shyrgys Qazaqstan, Kazakh SSR, Soviet Union
- Height: 1.75 m (5 ft 9 in)
- Weight: 73 kg (161 lb)

Sport
- Sport: Judo
- Event: 73 kg
Medal record
Men's judo
Representing Kazakhstan
Asian Championships
Silver medal – second place	2004 Almaty	73 kg

Sagdat Kabirovich Sadykov (Kazakh: Сагдат Кабирович Садыков; born July 29, 1973, in Oskemen, Shyrgys Qazaqstan) is a Kazakh judoka, who competed in the men's lightweight category. He picked up five medals in his career, including a silver from the 2004 Asian Judo Championships in Almaty, and competed in two editions of the Olympic Games (2000 and 2004) under two different banners Kyrgyzstan and Kazakhstan, respectively.

Sadykov made his official debut at the 2000 Summer Olympics in Sydney, where he competed for the Kyrgyz team in the men's lightweight class (73 kg). He lost his opening match to South Korea's Choi Yong-sin, who scored an ippon victory and clutched him on the tatami with a kosoto gake (small outer hook) at one minute and thirty-nine seconds. In the repechage, Sadykov gave himself a chance for an Olympic bronze medal, but succumbed to another ippon, yet a seoi nage (shoulder throw) topple from U.S. judoka and 1996 Olympic bronze medalist Jimmy Pedro during their first playoff of the draft.

At the 2004 Summer Olympics in Athens, Sadykov qualified for his newly joined Kazakh squad in the men's lightweight class (60 kg), by placing second and receiving a berth from the Asian Championships in Almaty. Seeking for his revenge against Pedro in the opening round, Sadykov failed to clutch him with a scarf hold (kesa gatame on the tatami, and suffered an ippon defeat with nearly a minute remaining in the match.
