= Mahmoud Abbas (cyclist) =

Egyptian cyclist (born 1978)

Personal information
- Nationality: Egyptian
- Born: 20 January 1978
- Height: 1.65 m (5 ft 5 in)
- Weight: 65 kg (143 lb)

Sport
- Sport: Cycling

Mahmoud Ahmad Abbas (born 20 January 1978) is an Egyptian cyclist. He competed in the men's individual road race at the 2000 Summer Olympics.
