= Reiver Alvarenga =

Venezuelan judoka (born 1978)

Personal information
- Born: March 11, 1978 (age 48)
- Occupation: Judoka

Sport
- Sport: Judo
Medal record
Men's Judo
Representing Venezuela
Pan American Games
Bronze medal – third place	2003	Extra Lightweight

Profile at external databases
- JudoInside.com: 9430

Reiver David Alvarenga Domínguez (born March 11, 1978) is a male judoka from Venezuela, who won the bronze medal in the men's extra lightweight division (– 60 kg) at the 2003 Pan American Games in Santo Domingo, Dominican Republic. He represented his native country in two consecutive Summer Olympics, starting in 2000.
