= Mohamed Kholafy =

Egyptian cyclist

Personal information
- Born: 11 March 1977 (age 49)

Cycling career
- Sport: Cycling

Mohamed Kholafy (born 11 March 1977) is an Egyptian former cyclist. He competed in the men's individual road race at the 2000 Summer Olympics.

== Major results ==
1999
3rd Overall Tour du Faso

1st Stage 6a

2001
9th Road race, African Road Championships
