= Christoph Stangl =

Austrian judoka

Personal information
- Nationality: Austrian
- Born: 19 June 1978 (age 47) Salzburg, Austria
- Occupation: Judoka

Sport
- Sport: Judo

Profile at external databases
- JudoInside.com: 536

Christoph Stangl (born 19 June 1978) is an Austrian judoka. He competed in the men's lightweight event at the 2000 Summer Olympics.
