= Samoa at the 2000 Summer Olympics =

- IOC code: SAM
- NOC: Samoa Association of Sports and National Olympic Committee Inc.
- Website: www.oceaniasport.com/samoa

in Sydney
- Flag bearer: Pauga Lalau
- Medals: Gold 0 Silver 0 Bronze 0 Total 0

Summer Olympics appearances (overview)
- 1984; 1988; 1992; 1996; 2000; 2004; 2008; 2012; 2016; 2020; 2024; 2028

Samoa competed at the 2000 Summer Olympics in Sydney, Australia. In the previous games, the country participated under the name Western Samoa.

== Results by event ==
=== Boxing ===
Men's 91 kg

- Pauga Lalau
  - Round 1 – Lost to S Ibraguimov (Rus)

=== Cycling ===
==== Road Cycling ====
Women's Road Race

- Bianca Jane Netzler
  1. Final – DNF

=== Judo ===
Men's 73 kg

- Travolta P Waterhouse
  - Round 1 – Lost to G Maddaloni (Ita)
  - Round 1 – Lost to H Moussa (Tun)

=== Weightlifting ===
Men

Athlete	Event	Snatch			Clean & Jerk			Total	Rank
Athlete	Event	1	2	3	1	2	3	Total	Rank
Ofisa Ofisa	– 85 kg	135.0	~~140.0~~	~~140.0~~	175.0	~~180.0~~	~~180.0~~	310.0	18

=== Wrestling ===
Men's Greco-Roman 76 kg

- Faafetai Iutana
  - Round 1 – Lost to A Michalkiewicz (Pol)
  - Round 1 – Lost to D Manukyan (Ukr)
  - Round 1 – Lost to V Makarenko (Blr)

== See also ==
- Samoa at the 2000 Summer Paralympics
