= Cycling at the 2000 Summer Olympics – Men's road time trial =

Cycling at the Olympics

Men's road time trial at the Games of the XXVII Olympiad
- Venues: Centennial Parklands
- Date: 30 September 2000
- Competitors: 38 from 26 nations
- Winning time: 57:40.420

Medalists
1st place, gold medalist(s)		Viatcheslav Ekimov	Russia
2nd place, silver medalist(s)		Jan Ullrich	Germany

These are the official results of the men's individual time trial at the 2000 Summer Olympics in Sydney, Australia. The race was held on Saturday, September 30, 2000, with a race distance of 46.8 km.

On 17 January 2013, Lance Armstrong was stripped of the bronze medal and disqualified by the International Olympic Committee for an anti-doping rule violation. They also decided not to award Spanish cyclist Abraham Olano the medal, as he had also tested positive for doping, back in 1998.

== Medalists ==
Gold medal	Silver medal	Bronze medal
Viatcheslav Ekimov (RUS)	Jan Ullrich (GER)	not awarded

== Final classification ==
Rank	Cyclist	Nation	Time
1	Viacheslav Ekimov	Russia	57:40
2	Jan Ullrich	Germany	+ 0.08
DSQ	~~Lance Armstrong~~	United States	~~+ 0.34~~
4	Abraham Olano	Spain	+ 0.51
5	Laurent Jalabert	France	+ 1.04
6	Andrei Teteriouk	Kazakhstan	+ 1.12
7	Thor Hushovd	Norway	+ 1.20
8	Santos González Capilla	Spain	+ 1.23
9	Serhiy Honchar	Ukraine	+ 1.40
10	Tyler Hamilton	United States	+ 1.46
11	Chris Boardman	Great Britain	+ 1.52
12	Andreas Klöden	Germany	+ 1.53
13	Christophe Moreau	France	+ 1.57
14	Evgueni Petrov	Russia	+ 2.00
15	Raivis Belohvoščiks	Latvia	+ 2.17
16	David Millar	Great Britain	+ 2.37
17	Evgeny Vakker	Kyrgyzstan	+ 2.41
18	Sergiy Matveyev	Ukraine	+ 2.45
19	Nathan O'Neill	Australia	+ 2.52
20	Eric Wohlberg	Canada	+ 2.54
21	Dainis Ozols	Latvia	+ 3.06
22	Martin Hvastija	Slovenia	+ 3.28
23	Raimondas Rumšas	Lithuania	+ 3.28
24	Víctor Hugo Peña	Colombia	+ 3.30
25	Artūras Kasputis	Lithuania	+ 3.42
26	Koos Moerenhout	Netherlands	+ 3.47
27	Alexander Vinokourov	Kazakhstan	+ 3.54
28	Tomáš Konečný	Czech Republic	+ 3.56
29	Erik Dekker	Netherlands	+ 4.00
30	Martin Rittsel	Sweden	+ 4.19
31	Piotr Wadecki	Poland	+ 4.24
32	Lauri Aus	Estonia	+ 4.36
33	Alex Zülle	Switzerland	+ 4.54
34	René Haselbacher	Austria	+ 4.58
35	Vítor Gamito	Portugal	+ 5.36
36	Amr El Nady	Egypt	+ 5.38
37	Michael Andersson	Sweden	+ 7.39
38	Michael Sandstød	Denmark	DNF
