= Innar Mändoja =

Estonian cyclist

Personal information
- Born: 27 February 1978 (age 48) Jõgeva, then part of Estonian SSR, Soviet Union
- Height: 1.75 m (5 ft 9 in)
- Weight: 69 kg (152 lb)

Cycling career
- Sport: Cycling
- Current team: Retired
- Discipline: Road
- Role: Rider

Professional teams
- 1999: Casino–Ag2r Prévoyance (stagiaire)
- 2000–2002: AG2R Prévoyance

Innar Mändoja (born 27 February 1978) is an Estonian former professional racing cyclist, who rode for the AG2R Prévoyance squad from 2000 to 2002. He competed in the road race at the 2000 Summer Olympics, although he did not finish.
