= Cycling at the 2000 Summer Olympics – Men's individual road race =

Men's cycling road race at the Games of the XXVII Olympiad
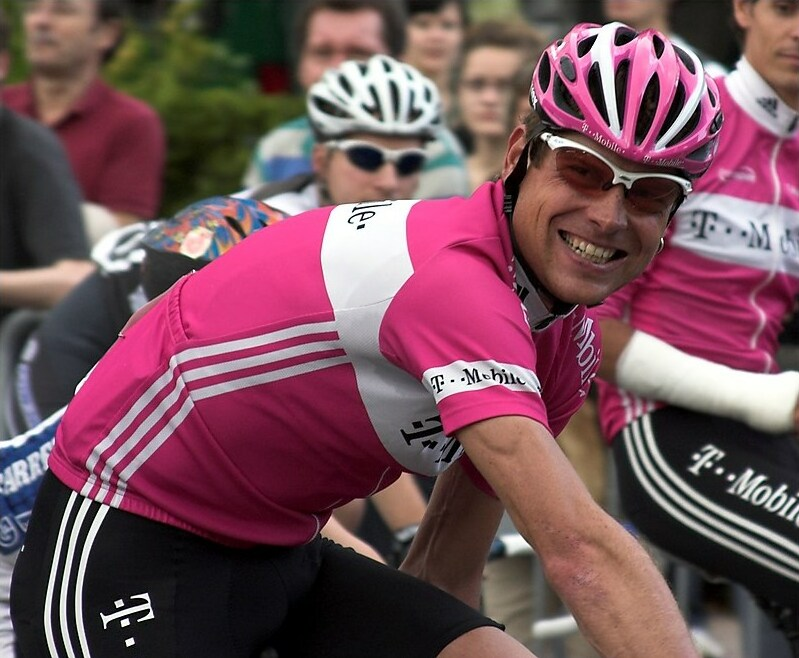
- Jan Ullrich (pictured in 2006) won the race.
- Venue: Centennial Parklands, Sydney
- Date: 27 September
- Competitors: 154 from 41 nations
- Winning time: 5:29:08

Medalists
1st place, gold medalist(s)		Jan Ullrich; Germany
2nd place, silver medalist(s)		Alexander Vinokourov; Kazakhstan
3rd place, bronze medalist(s)		Andreas Klöden; Germany

The men's individual road race at the 2000 Summer Olympics in Sydney, Australia, was held on Wednesday, 27 September 2000 (the second day of competition of the games) with a race distance of 239.4 km. The estimated global TV audience was 600 million. They were specifically held in Sydney's Eastern Suburbs. There were 154 cyclists from 41 nations competing. The maximum number of cyclists per nation had been five since professionals were allowed in 1996. The event was won by Jan Ullrich of Germany, the nation's first victory in the men's individual road race (though Olaf Ludwig of East Germany had won in 1988). His teammate Andreas Klöden's bronze made this race the first time one nation had taken two medals in the event since 1988—when West Germany had done so by taking silver and bronze (making an all-German podium then, with Ludwig's gold). Alexander Vinokourov took silver for Kazakhstan's first medal in the event.

== Background ==
This was the 16th appearance of the event, previously held in 1896 and then at every Summer Olympics since 1936. It replaced the individual time trial event that had been held from 1912 to 1932; the time trial had been re-introduced in 1996 alongside the road race. The change to including professionals in 1996 meant that 2000 was the first Games that saw significant repeat competitors in the event (which had typically seen top cyclists turn professional after one appearance); Atlanta silver medalist Rolf Sørensen of Denmark and bronze medalist Max Sciandri of Great Britain returned. Favorites were "difficult" to select for the one-day race. Lance Armstrong (1999 and 2000 Tour de France winner) and Jan Ullrich (1997 Tour de France winner) were among the prominent cyclists, but the road race was a very different event from a Tour and "neither was considered a great sprinter".

Egypt and Kyrgyzstan each made their debut in the men's individual road race. Great Britain made its 16th appearance in the event, the only nation to have competed in each appearance to date.

== Competition format and course ==
The mass-start race was on a 239.4 kilometre course over the Cycling Road Course in Sydney's Centennial Parklands. The distance had been increased from previous Olympic road races (particularly pre-1996, though the distance was nearly 20 kilometres more than 1996 as well) to be more consistent with professional races.

== Schedule ==
All times are Australian Eastern Standard Time (UTC+10)

Date	Time	Round
Wednesday, 27 September 2000	10:00	Final

== Results ==
A three-cyclist breakout occurred with 25 kilometres to go: Ullrich and two of his Deutsche Telekom teammates, Vinokourov and Klöden.

Rank	Cyclist	Nation	Time
1st place, gold medalist(s)	Jan Ullrich	Germany	5:29:08
2nd place, silver medalist(s)	Alexander Vinokourov	Kazakhstan	+ 9"
3rd place, bronze medalist(s)	Andreas Klöden	Germany	+ 12"
4	Michele Bartoli	Italy	+ 1' 26"
5	Laurent Jalabert	France	s.t.
6	Frank Høj	Denmark	s.t.
7	Piotr Wadecki	Poland	s.t.
8	George Hincapie	United States	s.t.
9	Paolo Bettini	Italy	s.t.
10	Dmitri Konychev	Russia	s.t.
11	Danilo Di Luca	Italy	+ 1' 29"
12	Axel Merckx	Belgium	s.t.
DPG	Lance Armstrong	United States	~~s.t.~~
14	Erik Zabel	Germany	+ 1' 38"
15	Max van Heeswijk	Netherlands	s.t.
16	Gordon Fraser	Canada	s.t.
17	Óscar Freire	Spain	s.t.
18	Jaan Kirsipuu	Estonia	s.t.
19	Robbie McEwen	Australia	s.t.
20	Zbigniew Spruch	Poland	s.t.
21	Markus Zberg	Switzerland	s.t.
22	Arvis Piziks	Latvia	s.t.
23	Peter Wrolich	Austria	s.t.
24	Rolf Aldag	Germany	s.t.
25	Léon van Bon	Netherlands	s.t.
26	Andrej Hauptman	Slovenia	s.t.
27	Vladimir Duma	Ukraine	s.t.
28	Glenn Magnusson	Sweden	s.t.
29	Pavel Tonkov	Russia	s.t.
30	Henk Vogels	Australia	s.t.
31	Ruber Marín	Colombia	s.t.
32	Uroš Murn	Slovenia	s.t.
33	Nico Mattan	Belgium	s.t.
34	Fred Rodriguez	United States	s.t.
35	Maximiliano Sciandri	Great Britain	s.t.
36	Serguei Ivanov	Russia	s.t.
37	Oscar Camenzind	Switzerland	s.t.
38	John Tanner	Great Britain	s.t.
39	Serguei Outchakov	Ukraine	s.t.
40	Nicki Sørensen	Denmark	s.t.
41	Gerrit Glomser	Austria	s.t.
42	Olexandr Fedenko	Ukraine	s.t.
43	David McCann	Ireland	s.t.
44	Raimondas Rumšas	Lithuania	s.t.
45	Laurent Brochard	France	s.t.
46	Andrei Teteriouk	Kazakhstan	s.t.
47	Christopher Jenner	New Zealand	s.t.
48	Zbigniew Piątek	Poland	s.t.
49	Tyler Hamilton	United States	s.t.
50	Omar Pumar	Venezuela	s.t.
51	Matthias Buxhofer	Austria	s.t.
52	Antonio Cruz	United States	s.t.
53	Alexandr Shefer	Kazakhstan	s.t.
54	Mauro Gianetti	Switzerland	s.t.
55	Erki Pütsep	Estonia	s.t.
56	Jens Voigt	Germany	s.t.
57	Sergei Yakovlev	Kazakhstan	s.t.
58	Piotr Przydział	Poland	s.t.
59	Rolf Sørensen	Denmark	s.t.
60	Abraham Olano	Spain	s.t.
61	Julian Dean	New Zealand	s.t.
62	Christophe Moreau	France	s.t.
63	Richard Virenque	France	s.t.
64	Laurent Dufaux	Switzerland	s.t.
65	Volodimir Gustov	Ukraine	s.t.
66	Francesco Casagrande	Italy	s.t.
67	Marc Wauters	Belgium	s.t.
68	Alex Zülle	Switzerland	s.t.
69	Marco Pantani	Italy	s.t.
70	Pavel Padrnos	Czech Republic	s.t.
71	Rik Verbrugghe	Belgium	s.t.
72	Eric Wohlberg	Canada	s.t.
73	Andrei Kivilev	Kazakhstan	s.t.
74	Ciarán Power	Ireland	+ 5' 50"
75	Viacheslav Ekimov	Russia	s.t.
76	Tomáš Konečný	Czech Republic	s.t.
77	Stuart O'Grady	Australia	+ 7' 06"
78	Bjørnar Vestøl	Norway	s.t.
79	Peter Van Petegem	Belgium	s.t.
80	Tristan Hoffman	Netherlands	s.t.
81	Andris Reiss	Latvia	+ 12' 53"
82	José Medina	Chile	+ 12' 54"
83	Manuel Guevara	Venezuela	+ 13' 35"
84	Carlos Maya	Venezuela	s.t.
85	Scott Guyton	New Zealand	+ 14' 13"
86	David George	South Africa	+ 16' 43"
87	Milan Dvorščík	Slovakia	+ 22' 45"
88	Alexis Méndez	Venezuela	+ 23' 39"
89	Murilo Fischer	Brazil	s.t.
90	Martin Riška	Slovakia	s.t.
91	Óscar Pineda	Guatemala	s.t.
92	Pedro Pablo Pérez	Cuba	+ 23' 40"
—	Scott McGrory	Australia	DNF
—	Matt White	Australia	DNF
—	René Haselbacher	Austria	DNF
—	Thomas Mühlbacher	Austria	DNF
—	Czeslaw Lukaszewicz	Canada	DNF
—	Brian Walton	Canada	DNF
—	Luis Fernando Sepúlveda	Chile	DNF
—	Santiago Botero	Colombia	DNF
—	Jhon García	Colombia	DNF
—	Fredy González	Colombia	DNF
—	Víctor Hugo Peña	Colombia	DNF
—	Radim Kořínek	Czech Republic	DNF
—	Ján Svorada	Czech Republic	DNF
—	Lars Michaelsen	Denmark	DNF
—	Michael Sandstød	Denmark	DNF
—	Mahmoud Abbas	Egypt	DNF
—	Amer El-Nady	Egypt	DNF
—	Mohamed Abdel Fattah	Egypt	DNF
—	Mohamed Kholafy	Egypt	DNF
—	Juan Carlos Domínguez	Spain	DNF
—	Santos González	Spain	DNF
—	Miguel Ángel Martín Perdiguero	Spain	DNF
—	Lauri Aus	Estonia	DNF
—	Innar Mändoja	Estonia	DNF
—	Janek Tombak	Estonia	DNF
—	Christophe Capelle	France	DNF
—	Nick Craig	Great Britain	DNF
—	Rob Hayles	Great Britain	DNF
—	Jeremy Hunt	Great Britain	DNF
—	Jazy Garcia	Guam	DNF
—	Hossein Askari	Iran	DNF
—	Ahad Kazemi	Iran	DNF
—	Yoshiyuki Abe	Japan	DNF
—	Evgeny Vakker	Kyrgyzstan	DNF
—	Raivis Belohvoščiks	Latvia	DNF
—	Andris Naudužs	Latvia	DNF
—	Dainis Ozols	Latvia	DNF
—	Artūras Kasputis	Lithuania	DNF
—	Remigijus Lupeikis	Lithuania	DNF
—	Saulius Šarkauskas	Lithuania	DNF
—	Erik Dekker	Netherlands	DNF
—	Koos Moerenhout	Netherlands	DNF
—	Kurt Asle Arvesen	Norway	DNF
—	Svein Gaute Hølestøl	Norway	DNF
—	Thor Hushovd	Norway	DNF
—	Glen Mitchell	New Zealand	DNF
—	Piotr Chmielewski	Poland	DNF
—	José Azevedo	Portugal	DNF
—	Bruno Castanheira	Portugal	DNF
—	Vítor Gamito	Portugal	DNF
—	Orlando Rodrigues	Portugal	DNF
—	Robert Hunter	South Africa	DNF
—	Evgeni Petrov	Russia	DNF
—	Martin Hvastija	Slovenia	DNF
—	Tadej Valjavec	Slovenia	DNF
—	Roman Broniš	Slovakia	DNF
—	Róbert Nagy	Slovakia	DNF
—	Magnus Bäckstedt	Sweden	DNF
—	Michel Lafis	Sweden	DNF
—	Martin Rittsel	Sweden	DNF
—	Serhiy Honchar	Ukraine	DNF
—	Gregorio Bare	Uruguay	DNF

== Sources ==
- Official Report of the 2000 Sydney Summer Olympics available at https://web.archive.org/web/20060622162855/http://www.la84foundation.org/5va/reports_frmst.htm
