= Ediane Gomes =

Brazilian mixed martial arts fighter

- Born: November 26, 1980 (age 45); São Paulo, Brazil
- Other names: India
- Height: 5 ft 6 in (1.68 m)
- Weight: 135 lb (61 kg; 9.6 st)
- Division: Featherweight; Bantamweight
- Fighting out of: São Paulo, Brazil
- Team: American Top Team

Mixed martial arts record
- Total: 15
- Wins: 11
- By knockout: 1
- By submission: 7
- By decision: 3
- Losses: 4
- By knockout: 1
- By submission: 2
- By decision: 1

Other information
- Mixed martial arts record from Sherdog

Ediane Gomes (born November 26, 1980) is a Brazilian former mixed martial artist who competed in the Bantamweight division. She notably fought in the Invicta FC.

== Mixed martial arts career ==
Gomes made her MMA debut on August 16, 2007. After winning her first five fights, Gomes then faced future UFC Women's Bantamweight and Featherweight Champion, Amanda Nunes. She lost via TKO in the second round.

After her first-round victory over Marissa Caldwell at Bitetti Combat 6, Gomes fought future UFC Women's Bantamweight Champion Ronda Rousey, in Rousey's MMA debut. Gomes lost via armbar 25 seconds into the fight.

=== Invicta Fighting Championships ===
Gomes made her successful Invicta FC debut at Invicta FC 3 defeating Katalina Malungahu via rear naked choke in the first round.

Gomes was then set to take on Hiroko Yamanaka at Invicta FC 4. She won via unanimous decision.

Gomes was expected to take on Cristiane Justino at Invicta FC 5 but pulled out due to injury. She was then expected to return at Invicta FC 6 against Julia Budd but Budd pulled out due to injury and was replaced by Tamikka Brents. Brents also pulled due to injury as was replaced by Charmaine Tweet. The fight was then cancelled all together due to Tweet having visa issues.

Gomes finally returned at Invicta FC 8 taking on Tonya Evinger. She lost via first round armbar.

Gomes then faced Raquel Pa'aluhi at Invicta FC 12: Kankaanpää vs. Souza. She lost via unanimous decision.

Gomes faced Pam Sorenson at Invicta FC 23: Porto vs. Niedźwiedź. She won the fight via split decision.

In May 2018, Gomes announced her retirement from mixed martial arts on her social media.

== Mixed martial arts record ==
Professional record breakdown
15 matches	11 wins	4 losses
By knockout	1	1
By submission	7	2
By decision	3	1

Res.	Record	Opponent	Method	Event	Date	Round	Time	Location	Notes
Win	11–4	Pam Sorenson	Decision (split)	Invicta FC 23: Porto vs. Niedźwiedź	May 20, 2017	3	5:00	Kansas City, Missouri, United States	
Loss	10–4	Raquel Pa'aluhi	Decision (unanimous)	Invicta FC 12: Kankaanpää vs. Souza	April 24, 2015	3	5:00	Kansas City, Missouri, United States	
Loss	10–3	Tonya Evinger	Submission (armbar)	Invicta FC 8: Waterson vs. Tamada	September 6, 2014	1	3:31	Kansas City, Missouri, United States	Bantamweight debut.
Win	10–2	Hiroko Yamanaka	Decision (unanimous)	Invicta FC 4: Esparza vs. Hyatt	January 5, 2013	3	5:00	Kansas City, Kansas, United States	
Win	9–2	Katalina Malungahu	Submission (rear-naked choke)	Invicta FC 3: Penne vs. Sugiyama	October 6, 2012	1	4:19	Kansas City, Kansas, United States	
Win	8–2	Leslie Smith	Decision (unanimous)	BEP 5 - Breast Cancer Beatdown	October 1, 2011	3	5:00	Fletcher, North Carolina, United States	
Win	7–2	Katrine Alendal	Submission (Ankle lock)	BlackEye Promotions 4	June 17, 2011	1	0:42	Fletcher, North Carolina, United States	
Loss	6–2	Ronda Rousey	Submission (armbar)	KOTC: Turning Point	March 27, 2011	1	0:25	Tarzana, California, United States	
Win	6–1	Marissa Caldwell	Submission (armbar)	World Extreme Fighting 45	January 22, 2011	1	1:46	Jacksonville, Florida, United States	
Loss	5–1	Amanda Nunes	TKO (punches)	Bitetti Combat 6	February 25, 2010	2	3:00	Brazil	
Win	5–0	Ana Maria	Submission (armbar)	Jungle Fight 11	September 13, 2008	2	3:01	Rio de Janeiro, Brazil	
Win	4–0	Michelle Farias	Submission (armbar)	Jungle Fight 10	July 12, 2008	1	0:48	Rio de Janeiro, Brazil	
Win	3–0	Pamela Rivelles	TKO (punches)	Beach Fight Festival	May 10, 2008	1	1:36	São Paulo, Brazil	
Win	2–0	Elaine Santiago de Lima	Submission (armbar)	Cla Fighting Championships 2	September 15, 2007	1	2:36	São Paulo, Brazil	
Win	1–0	Elaine Santiago de Lima	Submission (armbar)	Extreme Fight Championships 1	August 16, 2007	1	n/a	São Paulo, Brazil	
