= Anatoly Laryukov =

Judoka

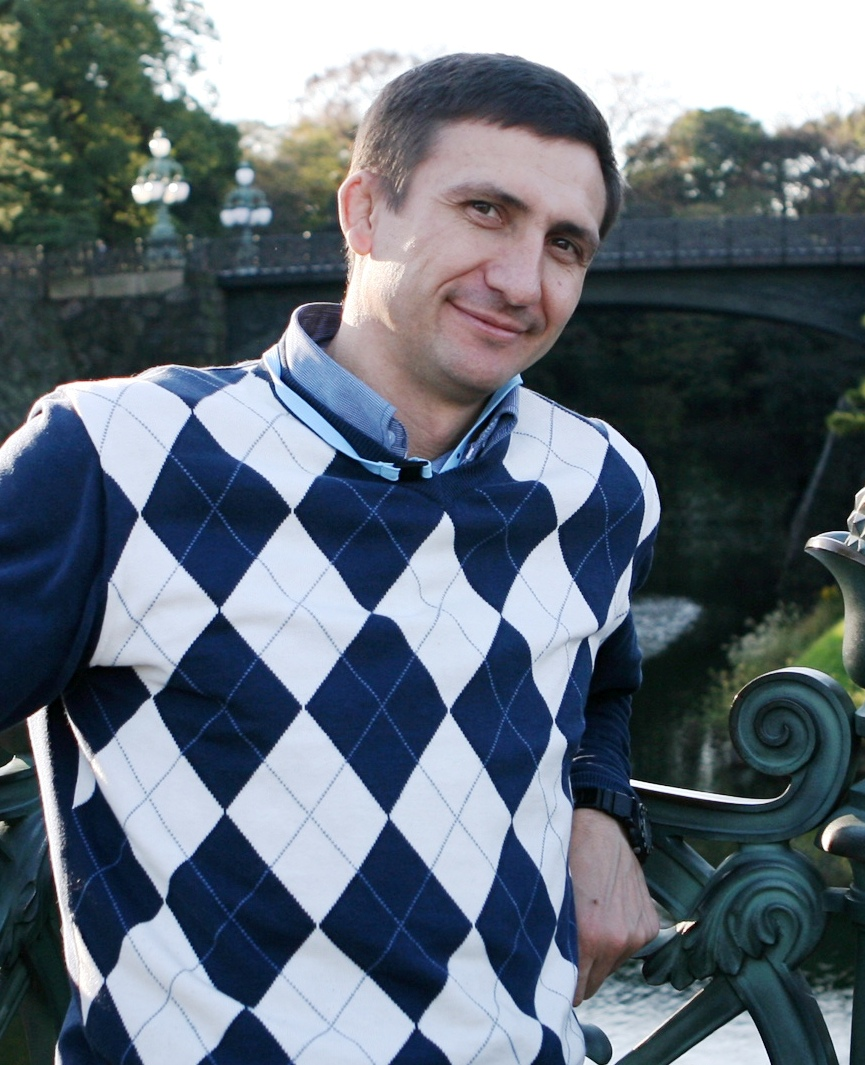

Personal information
- Born: 28 October 1970 (age 55) Vladikavkaz, Russian SFSR, Soviet Union
- Occupation: Judoka

Sport
- Country: Belarus, Russia
- Sport: Judo
- Weight class: –71 kg, –73 kg

Achievements and titles
- Olympic Games: (bronze) (2000)
- World Champ.: 7th (1999)
- European Champ.: (gold) (2002)
Medal record
Men's judo
Representing Belarus
Olympic Games
Bronze medal – third place	2000 Sydney	‍–‍73 kg
European Championships
Gold medal – first place	2002 Maribor	‍–‍73 kg
Silver medal – second place	1997 Oostende	‍–‍71 kg
Bronze medal – third place	2003 Düsseldorf	‍–‍73 kg
European Junior Championships
Gold medal – first place	1990 Ankara	‍–‍71 kg

Profile at external databases
- IJF: 428
- JudoInside.com: 7478
- Updated on 31 May 2023

Anatoly Laryukov (Russian: Анатолий Владимирович Ларюков; born 28 October 1970) is a Russian and Belarusian judoka. At the 2000 Summer Olympics he won the bronze medal in the men's lightweight (‍–‍73 kg) category, together with Vsevolods Zeļonijs of Latvia. This was Belarus' first-ever Olympic medal in the sport.

== Career ==
He finished his career in 2004. Since 2013 Laryukov has been the Chief of Department of Russian Judo Federation.

== Achievements ==
- The bronze medal winner of the Olympic Games in Sydney (2000)
- The first Belarus judoka who won a medal in the Olympic Games.
- The participant of the Olympic Games in Athens 2004.

Year	Tournament	Place	Weight class
2004	European Club Cup final, Abensberg	1	73 kg
2004	A-Tournament, Minsk	3	73 kg
2004	German World Open, Hamburg	5	73 kg
2004	Super A-Tournament Tournoi de Paris, Paris	3	73 kg
2003	European Club Cup final, Haarlem	3	73 kg
2003	European Championships, Düsseldorf	3	73 kg
2003	A-Tournament, Tallinn	3	73 kg
2002	World Masters, Bucharest	2	73 kg
2002	Grand Prix, Moscow	3	73 kg
2002	European Team Championships, Maribor	2	73 kg
2002	European Championships, Maribor	1	73 kg
2002	A-Tournament, Warsaw	3	73 kg
2001	Presidents Cup, Novokuznetsk	3	73 kg
2001	European Club Cup final, Haarlem	1	73 kg
2001	Grand Prix, Moscow	2	73 kg
2001	A-Tournament, Minsk	1	73 kg
2001	World Masters, Munich	1	73 kg
2001	International Tournament, Tallinn	1	73 kg
2000	Sydney Olympic Games, Sydney	3	73 kg
2000	A-Tournament, Minsk	3	73 kg
2000	Polish Open, Warsaw	3	73 kg
2000	A-Tournament Budapest Bank Cup, Budapest	7	73 kg
1999	World Championships, Birmingham	7	73 kg
1999	A-Tournament, Minsk	1	73 kg
1999	Grand Prix Cittа di Roma, Roma	5	73 kg
1999	A-Tournament Budapest Bank Cup, Budapest	1	73 kg
1998	Russian Championships, Kstovo	2	73 kg
1998	World Championships Teams, Minsk	3	73 kg
1998	Trofeo Internazionale «Guido Sieni», Sassari	1	73 kg
1997	Russian Championships, Moscow	2	71 kg
1997	European Championships, Ostend	2	71 kg
1997	Czech Cup, Prague	2	71 kg
1997	International Tournament, Moscow	1	71 kg
1997	B-Tournament, Minsk	1	71 kg
1996	Russian Championships, Perm	1	71 kg
1996	European Team Championships, Saint Petersburg	3	71 kg
1996	International Tournament, Moscow	1	71 kg
1995	Russian Championships, Ryazan	3	71 kg
1995	International Tournament, Moscow	1	71 kg
1994	Russian Championships, Krasnoyarsk	3	71 kg
1994	International Tournament, Moscow	3	71 kg
1993	International Tournament, Moscow	3	71 kg
1992	CIS Championships, Ryazan	1	71 kg
1990	European Junior Championships, Ankara	1	71 kg
1988	International Junior Tournament «Friendship», Pyongyang	2	65 kg
