= 2008 in Jungle Fight =

Information
- First date: April 6, 2008
- Last date: September 13, 2008

Events
- Total events: 4

Fights
- Total fights: 34

Chronology
2006 in Jungle Fight	2008 in Jungle Fight	2009 in Jungle Fight

The year 2008 is the sixth year in the history of Jungle Fight, a mixed martial arts promotion based in Brazil. In 2008 Jungle Fight held 4 events beginning with, Jungle Fight 8.

== Events list ==
#	Event title	Date	Arena	Location
11	Jungle Fight 11	September 13, 2008	Windsor Barra Hotel	Rio de Janeiro, Brazil
10	Jungle Fight 10	July 12, 2008	Windsor Barra Hotel	Rio de Janeiro, Brazil
9	Jungle Fight 9: Warriors	May 31, 2008	Maracanãzinho Gymnasium	Rio de Janeiro, Brazil
8	Jungle Fight 8	April 6, 2008	Team Nogueira Training Center	Rio de Janeiro, Brazil

== Jungle Fight 8 ==
Jungle Fight 8 was an event held on April 6, 2008 at The Team Nogueira Training Center in Rio de Janeiro, Brazil.

=== Results ===
Main Card
Weight class				Method	Round	Time	Notes
	Paulo Thiago	def.	Leonardo Pecanha	Decision (Unanimous)	3	5:00
	Rodrigo Smurf	def.	Maicon Ribeiro	Decision (Unanimous)	3	5:00
	Rodrigo Ribeiro	def.	Pedro Santos	TKO (Doctor Stoppage)	1	5:00
	Alexandre Pimentel	def.	Paulo Goncalves Silva	Submission (Triangle Choke)	2	0:00
	Andre Luis de Oliveira	def.	Marcos Maciel de Oliveira	TKO (Punches)	2	0:00
	Erinaldo dos Santos Rodrigues	def.	Vinicius Lemes Bett	Decision (Unanimous)	3	5:00

== Jungle Fight 9: Warriors ==
Jungle Fight 9: Warriors was an event held on May 31, 2008 at The Maracanãzinho Gymnasium in Rio de Janeiro, Brazil.

=== Results ===
Main Card
Weight class				Method	Round	Time	Notes
	Ronys Torres	def.	Francinei Farinazzo	Submission (Armbar)	2	0:00
	Paulo Thiago	def.	Paulo Cavera	Submission (Arm-Triangle Choke)	1	0:00
	Thiago Goncalves	def.	Everton Santana Pinto	Decision (Unanimous)	3	5:00
	Andre Tadeu	def.	Daniel Moraes	KO	2	0:00
	Johnny Eduardo	def.	Erinaldo dos Santos Rodrigues	KO	0	0:00
	Erick Silva	def.	Carlos Eduardo Santos	Submission (Rear-Naked Choke)	3	0:00
	Allan Froes	def.	Ricardo Pecanha	KO	0	0:00
	Leonardo Carvalho Muller	def.	Bruno Menezes	Decision	3	0:00

== Jungle Fight 10 ==
Jungle Fight 10 was an event held on July 12, 2008 at Windsor Barra Hotel in Rio de Janeiro, Brazil.

=== Results ===
Main Card
Weight class				Method	Round	Time	Notes
	Ronys Torres	def.	Luiz Azeredo	Submission (Kimura)	1	4:34
	Assuério Silva	def.	Terroll Dees	Submission (Kneebar)	1	1:42
	Ediane Gomes	def.	Michelle Farias	Submission (Armbar)	1	0:48
	Paulo Thiago	def.	Ferrid Kheder	Decision (Unanimous)	3	5:00
	Pedro Santos	def.	Leonardo Pecanha	Decision (Unanimous)	3	5:00
	Xavier Foupa-Pokam	def.	Felipe Arinelli	TKO (Punches)	3	1:46
	Leonardo Carvalho Muller	def.	Paulo Dezenet	TKO (Elbow Injury)	1	0:48
	Alexandre Pimentel	def.	Renato Souza	Decision (Unanimous)	3	5:00
	Allan Froes	def.	Sebastian Bruno Pinto	Decision (Unanimous)	3	5:00

== Jungle Fight 11 ==
Jungle Fight 11 was an event held on September 13, 2008 at The Windsor Barra Hotel in Rio de Janeiro, Brazil.

=== Results ===
Main Card
Weight class				Method	Round	Time	Notes
	Todd Duffee	def.	Assuério Silva	TKO (Punches)	2	1:17
	Ronys Torres	def.	Elieni Silva	Submission (Armbar)	1	1:50
	Antony Rea	def.	Allan Froes	Decision (Split)	3	5:00
	Paulo Thiago	def.	Luiz Jorge Dutra Jr.	TKO (Knee Injury)	1	0:40
	Alexandre Pimentel	def.	Rafael Addario Bastos	Submission (Triangle Choke)	3	1:18
	Rafael Freitas	def.	Alexandre Visconte	Decision (Unanimous)	3	5:00
	Ediane Gomes	def.	Ana Maria	Submission (Armbar)	2	3:01
	Johil de Oliveira	def.	Danilo Noronha	Decision (Unanimous)	3	5:00
	Pedro Santos	def.	Ferrid Kheder	Decision (Unanimous)	3	5:00
	Erick Silva	def.	Igor Fernandes	Decision (Unanimous)	3	5:00
	Hacran Dias	def.	Rodrigo Ruiz	Decision (Unanimous)	3	5:00

== See also ==
- Jungle Fight
