= Paulo Thiago =

Brazilian mixed martial arts fighter

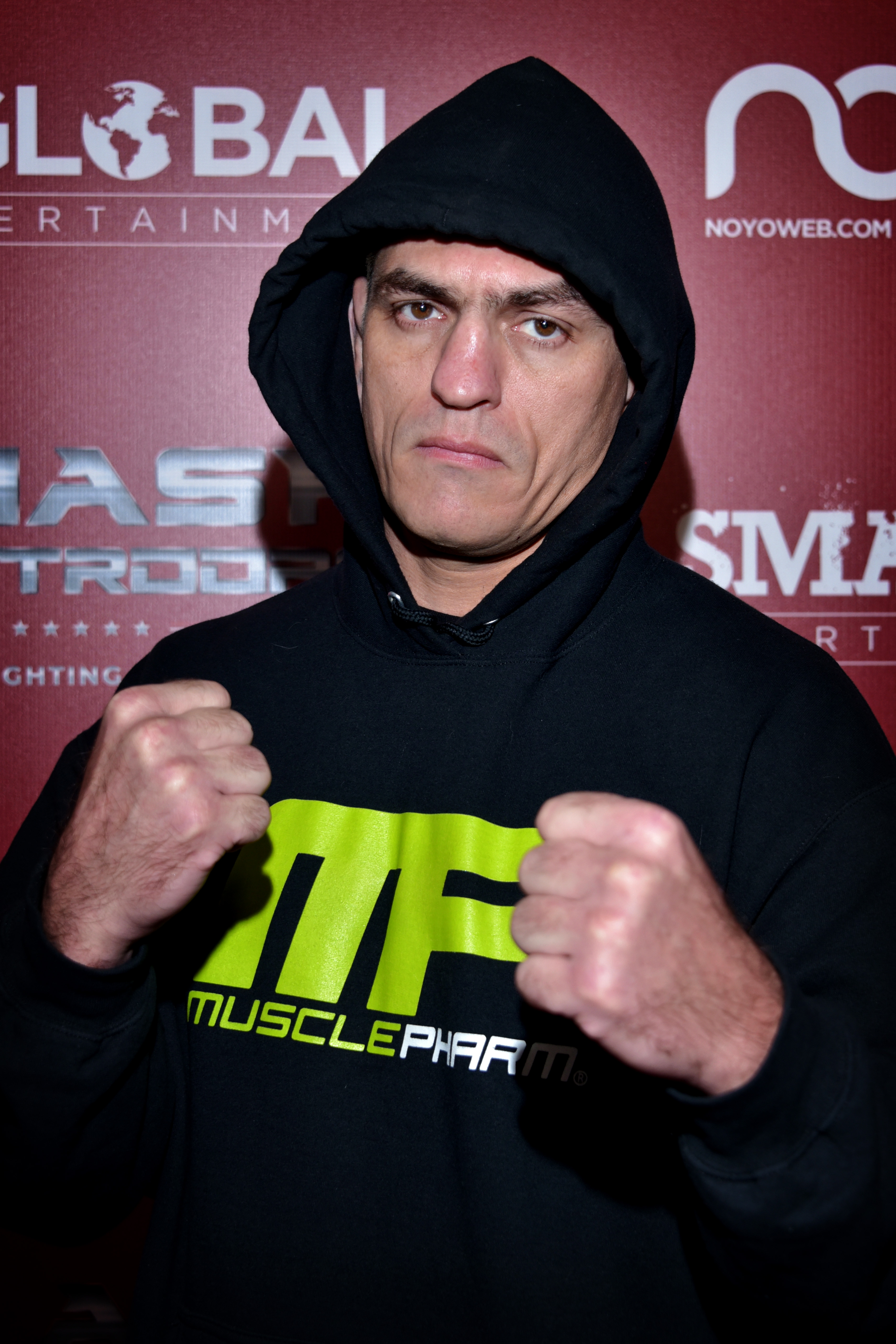
- Thiago at the SMASH Global IX Fight Night 2019
- Born: Paulo Thiago Alencar Antunes; January 25, 1981 (age 45); Brasília, DF, Brazil
- Nickname: Caveira ("Skull")
- Height: 5 ft 11 in (1.80 m)
- Weight: 184 lb (83 kg; 13.1 st)
- Division: Middleweight; Welterweight
- Reach: 74 1/2 in (189 cm)
- Stance: Orthodox
- Fighting out of: Brasília, Distrito Federal, Brazil
- Team: Team Constrictor; X-Gym (formerly)
- Rank: Black belt in Brazilian jiu-jitsu Black belt in Judo
- Years active: 2005–present

Mixed martial arts record
- Total: 30
- Wins: 19
- By knockout: 2
- By submission: 10
- By decision: 7
- Losses: 11
- By knockout: 3
- By submission: 1
- By decision: 7

Other information
- Mixed martial arts record from Sherdog

Paulo Thiago Alencar Antunes (Brazilian Portuguese pronunciation: [ˈpawlu tʃiˈaɡu]; born January 25, 1981) is a Brazilian mixed martial artist who most recently competed in the Middleweight division of KSW. A professional competitor since 2005, he has also competed for the UFC and Jungle Fight. Thiago is also a member of Polícia Militar do Distrito Federal and works for BOPE, a special forces unit in his hometown of Brasília, Brazil.

== Background ==
Thiago is from Brasília, Distrito Federal, and began training in judo when he was five years old.

== Mixed martial arts ==
=== Early career ===
Thiago made his professional debut at Storm Samurai 8 in 2005. He fought Ricardo Petrucio and won the fight via submission in round three. His next three fights came on the same night almost a year after his debut. Thiago competed in the Grand Prix Planaltina, winning all three of his fights and became the tournament winner. Thiago finished all three of the fights by submission. After two more victories, Thiago was signed by Jungle Fights MMA. Thiago won four fights for the promotion before being signed by the Ultimate Fighting Championships.

He currently trains with the Constrictor Team, an affiliate of Team Black House; the famed gym of Anderson Silva and the Nogueira brothers.

=== Ultimate Fighting Championship ===
Thiago never signed a contract before his fight against Koscheck, he was only able to acquire a tryout. Thiago made his UFC debut on February 21, 2009, scoring an upset victory over top contender Josh Koscheck at UFC 95. During the fight, commentator Joe Rogan commented that Thiago's striking looked inferior to Koscheck's. However, Thiago won the fight by KO, with a flush right uppercut and a left hook. The referee stopped the fight before Thiago could pounce on him. Koscheck immediately rose and argued that he was still alert and able to defend himself. Further review of the replay shows Koscheck's eyes roll back as he falls down, giving merit to the stoppage. At the post-fight conference, Dana White confirmed that Thiago had earned Knockout of the Night honors.

Thiago had his second fight in the UFC, fighting against former title challenger and Koscheck teammate Jon Fitch at UFC 100. This was Thiago's first fight in the United States and he lost via unanimous decision.

Thiago rebounded with a unanimous decision victory over UFC newcomer Jacob Volkmann at UFC 106.

In Thiago's fourth outing in the UFC octagon, he was set to have a rematch against Josh Koscheck at UFC 109. However, Koscheck pulled out of the bout after an undisclosed injury and was replaced by AKA teammate Mike Swick. Thiago won via submission (D'arce Choke) in the second round and earned his second UFC fight bonus with the win.

Thiago faced Martin Kampmann on June 12, 2010, at UFC 115 where he lost via unanimous decision (30-27, 30-27, 30-27).

Thiago lost his second straight fight via unanimous decision to Diego Sanchez on October 23, 2010, at UFC 121. Though Thiago started the fight off strong by winning the first round, he began to tire and eventually succumbed to the cardio and wrestling skills of Sanchez in the second and third rounds. The bout earned Fight of the Night, awarding both fighters an extra paycheck.

In November 2010, Thiago signed a new four-fight deal with the UFC. Thiago was expected to face Johny Hendricks on March 3, 2011, at UFC Live: Sanchez vs. Kampmann. However, Thiago was forced out of the bout with an elbow injury.

Thiago defeated David Mitchell via unanimous decision on August 27, 2011, at UFC 134, completely dominating Mitchell throughout all three rounds.

Thiago was expected to face Mike Pyle on January 14, 2012, at UFC 142. However, Thiago was forced out of the bout with an elbow injury and replaced by Ricardo Funch.

Thiago faced Siyar Bahadurzada on April 14, 2012, at UFC on Fuel TV: Gustafsson vs. Silva. He was knocked out less than a minute into the first round after Siyar landed a right hook to the jaw that followed a left jab as Thiago was moving forward. This marked the first time Thiago had been finished in his career.

Thiago next faced Dong Hyun Kim on November 10, 2012, at UFC on Fuel TV 6. He lost the bout via unanimous decision

Thiago was expected to face Lance Benoist on May 18, 2013, at UFC on FX 8. However, on April 20, it was announced that Benoist had to pull out of the bout due to an injury. He was replaced by UFC newcomer Michel Prazeres. Thiago won the fight via unanimous decision.

Thiago was expected to face Kelvin Gastelum on August 28, 2013, at UFC Fight Night 27. However, Thiago pulled out of the bout citing a knee injury.

Thiago faced Brandon Thatch at UFC Fight Night 32 on November 9, 2013. He tapped to strikes in the first round after absorbing a knee to the liver.

Thiago faced Gasan Umalatov on May 31, 2014, at The Ultimate Fighter Brazil 3 Finale. He lost the fight via unanimous decision.

Despite being 2–6 in his last eight fights inside the octagon, Thiago signed a new four-fight contract with the UFC in June 2014. He was expected to face Mike Rhodes at UFC Fight Night 51 on September 13, 2014. However, Rhodes was forced out of the bout due to injury and was briefly replaced by returning veteran Joe Riggs. Subsequently, Riggs was forced to pull out of the fight after accidentally shooting himself in the leg while cleaning a pistol at his home. Thiago instead faced Sean Spencer. Thiago lost the fight via unanimous decision and was subsequently released by the UFC.

=== Post-UFC career ===
After the release, Thiago was scheduled to face Joe Ray at Rebel FC 3 on June 26, 2015. However, Thiago withdrew from the bout due to an injury.

Then he was scheduled to face Abubakar Vagaev at Akhmat Fight Show 18 on April 9, 2016. Thiago was again forced to withdraw from the bout.

Thiago faced Markus Perez for the vacant Thunder Fight Middleweight Championship at Thunder Fight 7 on June 25, 2016. He lost the fight via split decision.

Thiago then faced Paulistenio Rocha for the interim TWC Welterweight Championship at The Warriors Combat 3 on August 13, 2016. He won the fight via unanimous decision and claimed the championship.

Thiago then faced Cheick Kone at Fight2Night 1 on November 4, 2016. He won the fight via third-round submission.

In the sophomore event of the promotion, Thiago faced Faycal Hucin at Fight2Night 2 on April 28, 2017. He won the fight via first-round submission.

Thiago faced Michał Materla at KSW 40: Dublin on October 22, 2017. He lost the fight via second-round knockout.

Thiago faced Ailton Barbosa at Global Legion FC 13 on December 13, 2019. He won the fight via unanimous decision.

Six days removed from his previous bout, Thiago faced Sam Liera at SMASH Global 9 on December 19, 2019. He lost the fight via first-round knockout.

== Personal life ==
Thiago is married and has twins.

== Championships and accomplishments ==
- Ultimate Fighting Championship
  - Knockout of the Night (One time) vs. Josh Koscheck
  - Submission of the Night (One time) vs. Mike Swick
  - Fight of the Night (One time) vs. Diego Sanchez
  - UFC.com Awards
    - 2009: Upset of the Year vs. Josh Koscheck, Ranked #6 Knockout of the Year vs. Josh Koscheck & Ranked #8 Newcomer of the Year
    - 2010: Ranked #9 Fight of the Year vs. Diego Sanchez

== Mixed martial arts record ==
Professional record breakdown
30 matches	19 wins	11 losses
By knockout	2	4
By submission	10	0
By decision	7	7

Res.	Record	Opponent	Method	Event	Date	Round	Time	Location	Notes
Loss	19–11	Sam Liera	TKO (punches)	SMASH Global 9	December 19, 2019	1	4:58	Hollywood, California, United States	
Win	19–10	Alton Barbosa	Decision (unanimous)	Global Legion FC 13	December 13, 2019	3	5:00	Miramar, Florida, United States	Catchweight (175 lbs) bout.
Loss	18–10	Michał Materla	TKO (punches)	KSW 40: Dublin	October 22, 2017	2	0:50	Dublin, Ireland	
Win	18–9	Faycal Hucin	Submission (armbar)	Fight2Night 2	April 28, 2017	1	3:11	Foz do Iguaçu, Paraná, Brazil	
Win	17–9	Cheick Kone	Submission (rear-naked choke)	Fight2Night 1	November 4, 2016	3	4:16	Rio de Janeiro, Rio de Janeiro, Brazil	Return to Middleweight.
Win	16–9	Paulistenio Rocha	Decision (unanimous)	The Warriors Combat 3	August 13, 2016	3	5:00	Brasília, Distrito Federal, Brazil	Won Interim Warriors Combat Welterweight Championship.
Loss	15–9	Markus Perez Echeimberg	Decision (split)	Thunder Fight 7	June 25, 2016	5	5:00	São Paulo, São Paulo, Brazil	Middleweight debut. For Thunder Fight Middleweight Championship.
Loss	15–8	Sean Spencer	Decision (unanimous)	UFC Fight Night: Bigfoot vs. Arlovski	September 13, 2014	3	5:00	Brasília, Distrito Federal, Brazil	
Loss	15–7	Gasan Umalatov	Decision (unanimous)	The Ultimate Fighter Brazil 3 Finale: Miocic vs. Maldonado	May 31, 2014	3	5:00	São Paulo, São Paulo, Brazil	
Loss	15–6	Brandon Thatch	TKO (submission to knee to the body)	UFC Fight Night: Belfort vs. Henderson 2	November 9, 2013	1	2:10	Goiânia, Goiás, Brazil	
Win	15–5	Michel Prazeres	Decision (unanimous)	UFC on FX: Belfort vs. Rockhold	May 18, 2013	3	5:00	Jaraguá do Sul, Santa Catarina, Brazil	
Loss	14–5	Dong Hyun Kim	Decision (unanimous)	UFC on Fuel TV: Franklin vs. Le	November 10, 2012	3	5:00	Macau, SAR, China	
Loss	14–4	Siyar Bahadurzada	KO (punch)	UFC on Fuel TV: Gustafsson vs. Silva	April 14, 2012	1	0:42	Stockholm, Sweden	
Win	14–3	David Mitchell	Decision (unanimous)	UFC 134	August 27, 2011	3	5:00	Rio de Janeiro, Rio de Janeiro, Brazil	
Loss	13–3	Diego Sanchez	Decision (unanimous)	UFC 121	October 23, 2010	3	5:00	Anaheim, California, United States	Fight of the Night.
Loss	13–2	Martin Kampmann	Decision (unanimous)	UFC 115	June 12, 2010	3	5:00	Vancouver, British Columbia, Canada	
Win	13–1	Mike Swick	Technical Submission (D'arce choke)	UFC 109	February 6, 2010	2	1:54	Las Vegas, Nevada, United States	Submission of the Night.
Win	12–1	Jacob Volkmann	Decision (unanimous)	UFC 106	November 21, 2009	3	5:00	Las Vegas, Nevada, United States	
Loss	11–1	Jon Fitch	Decision (unanimous)	UFC 100	July 11, 2009	3	5:00	Las Vegas, Nevada, United States	
Win	11–0	Josh Koscheck	KO (punches)	UFC 95	February 21, 2009	1	3:29	London, England	Knockout of the Night.
Win	10–0	Luiz Dutra Jr.	TKO (knee injury)	Jungle Fight 11	September 13, 2008	1	0:40	Rio de Janeiro, Rio de Janeiro, Brazil	
Win	9–0	Ferrid Kheder	Decision (unanimous)	Jungle Fight 10	July 12, 2008	3	5:00	Rio de Janeiro, Rio de Janeiro, Brazil	
Win	8–0	Paulo Cavera	Submission (arm-triangle choke)	Jungle Fight 9: Warriors	May 31, 2008	1	N/A	Rio de Janeiro, Rio de Janeiro, Brazil	
Win	7–0	Leonardo Pecanha	Decision (unanimous)	Jungle Fight 8	April 6, 2008	3	5:00	Rio de Janeiro, Rio de Janeiro, Brazil	
Win	6–0	Fernando Bettega	Submission (arm-triangle choke)	Capital Fight 1	December 14, 2007	1	2:02	Brasília, Distrito Federal, Brazil	
Win	5–0	Franklin Careli	Submission (rear-naked choke)	Conquista Fight 3	May 12, 2007	2	0:37	Rio de Janeiro, Rio de Janeiro, Brazil	
Win	4–0	Igor Maux	Submission (anaconda choke)	Grand Prix Planaltina	October 13, 2006	1	1:06	Planaltina, Distrito Federal, Brazil	
Win	3–0	Diogo Almeida	Submission (guillotine choke)	Grand Prix Planaltina	October 13, 2006	3	1:21	Planaltina, Distrito Federal, Brazil	
Win	2–0	Marcone Bezerra	Submission (arm-triangle choke)	Grand Prix Planaltina	October 13, 2006	3	1:31	Planaltina, Distrito Federal, Brazil	
Win	1–0	Ricardo Petrucio	Submission (triangle choke)	Storm Samurai 8	July 2, 2005	3	1:36	Rio de Janeiro, Rio de Janeiro, Brazil	
