= Luís Gregorio López =

Venezuelan judoka

Personal information
- Nationality: Venezuelan
- Born: 14 March 1979 (age 46)

Sport
- Sport: Judo

Luís Gregorio López (born 14 March 1979) is a Venezuelan judoka. He competed in the men's half-heavyweight event at the 2000 Summer Olympics.
