= Eduardo Manglés =

Venezuelan judoka

Personal information
- Nationality: Venezuelan
- Born: 7 November 1975 (age 49)

Sport
- Sport: Judo

Eduardo Manglés (born 7 November 1975) is a Venezuelan judoka. He competed in the men's lightweight event at the 2000 Summer Olympics.
