= Arlen Lovera =

Venezuelan artistic gymnast

- Born: 24 September 1984 (age 41)

Gymnastics career
- Discipline: Women's artistic gymnastics
- Country represented: Venezuela (2000)

Arlen Lovera (born 24 September 1984) is a retired Venezuelan female artistic gymnast, representing her nation at international competitions.

She participated at the 2000 Summer Olympics.
