= Gil Ofer =

Israeli judo coach and former judoka

Personal information
- Native name: גיל עופר
- Born: 15 July 1976 (age 50)
- Occupation: Judo coach

Sport
- Country: Israel
- Sport: Judo
- Weight class: ‍–‍71 kg, ‍–‍73 kg
- Rank: 5th dan black belt

Achievements and titles
- Olympic Games: 13th (2000)
- World Champ.: 13th (1999)
- European Champ.: 9th (1996)
Medal record
Men's judo
Representing Israel
Maccabiah Games
Gold medal – first place	1997 Tel Aviv	‍–‍78 kg

Profile at external databases
- IJF: 9262
- JudoInside.com: 7610
- Updated on 4 May 2025

Gil Ofer (also spelled Gil Offer, Hebrew: גיל עופר; born 15 July 1976) is an Israeli former Olympic judoka and coach.

== Personal life ==
He is a cousin of American Olympian fencer Tamir Bloom.

== Judo career ==
Ofer won the gold medal in judo in the under-73 kilograms weight class at the 1997 Maccabiah Games in Tel Aviv, and won the 1998 British Open in Birmingham, England.

In 2000, Ofer was ranked third on the European Circuit in his judo class (73 kilograms). Ofer won the Judo World Cups in Sofia in May 2000 and in Minsk in June 2000.

Ofer competed for Israel at the 2000 Summer Olympics in Sydney, Australia in men's under 73 kg. He came in tied for 13th place.

In 2002 Ofer won the Israeli Championship at U90, and in 2005 he won the Israeli Championship at U81.
