= Luis René López =

Venezuelan judoka

Personal information
- Nationality: Venezuelan
- Born: 27 February 1978 (age 47)

Sport
- Sport: Judo

Luis René López (born 27 February 1978) is a Venezuelan judoka. He competed in the men's middleweight event at the 2000 Summer Olympics.
