= Carlos Santander =

Venezuelan swimmer

Personal information
- Full name: Carlos Santander
- National team: Venezuela
- Born: 25 May 1975 (age 51) Caracas, Distrito Federal, Venezuela

Sport
- Sport: Swimming
- Strokes: Freestyle
- Club: Fort Lauderdale Swim Team (U.S.)
- College team: North Carolina State University (U.S.)
- Coach: Beth Harrell (U.S.)

Carlos Santander (born May 25, 1975) is a Venezuelan former swimmer, who specialized in sprint and middle-distance freestyle events.

== Career ==
He represented Venezuela in two editions of the Olympic Games (1996 and 2000), and also swam for the Fort Lauderdale Swim Team in Florida, while residing in the United States. During his college career, Santander trained for the NC State Wolfpack swimming and diving team, under head coach Beth Harrell, at North Carolina State University in Raleigh, North Carolina.

Santander made his Olympic debut at the 1996 Summer Olympics in Atlanta. There, he failed to reach the top 16 final in the 200 m freestyle, finishing in twenty-seventh place at 1:53.13. A member of the Venezuelan team, he also placed thirteenth in the 4 × 100 m freestyle relay (3:23.04), and eleventh in the 4 × 200 m freestyle relay (7:32.63).

At the 2000 Summer Olympics in Sydney, Santander competed for the Venezuelan squad in the men's 4 × 100 m freestyle relay. Teaming with Oswaldo Quevedo, Francisco Páez, and Francisco Sánchez in heat two, Santander swam the lead-off leg and recorded a split of 51.28, but the Venezuelans finished the race in seventh place and seventeenth overall in a final time of 3:24.64.
