= Ferrid Kheder =

French judoka and mixed martial arts fighter

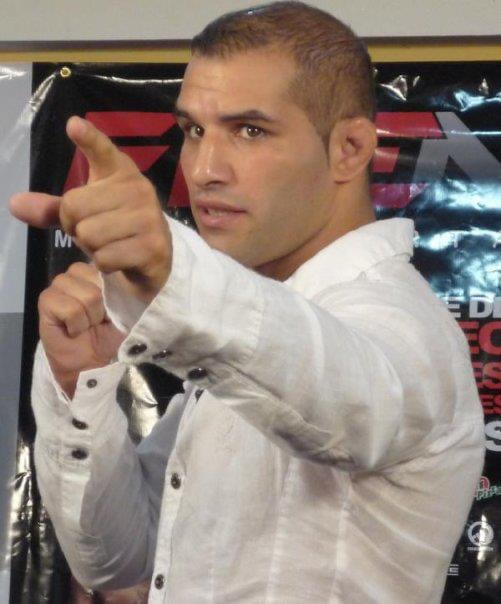
- Born: March 3, 1975 (age 51); France
- Native name: Ferrid Kheder
- Other names: Hurricane
- Nationality: French, American
- Height: 5 ft 7.5 in (1.71 m)
- Weight: 183 lb (83 kg; 13.1 st)
- Division: Welterweight; Lightweight
- Style: Judo
- Fighting out of: San Diego, California, US
- Team: Team FK; Las Vegas, Nevada, US
- Rank: 6th Dan in Judo; Black Belt in BJJ
- Years active: 1995-2013

Mixed martial arts record
- Total: 34
- Wins: 22
- By knockout: 8
- By submission: 11
- By decision: 3
- Losses: 11
- By knockout: 5
- By decision: 6
- No contests: 1

Other information
- Mixed martial arts record from Sherdog
- Judo career
- Weight class: ‍–‍73 kg

Judo achievements and titles
- Olympic Games: 7th (2000)
- World Champ.: R64 (2001, 2003)
- Regional finals: (bronze) (2000); (bronze) (2001, 2002)
Medal record
Men's judo
Representing Tunisia
African Championships
Bronze medal – third place	2001 Tripoli	‍–‍73 kg
Bronze medal – third place	2002 Cairo	‍–‍73 kg
Representing France
European Championships
Bronze medal – third place	2000 Wrocław	‍–‍73 kg
European Junior Championships
Gold medal – first place	1995 Valladolid	‍–‍71 kg
Summer Universiade
Bronze medal – third place	1998 Prague	‍–‍73 kg
Super World Cup
Gold medal – first place	1999 Paris	‍–‍73 kg
Gold medal – first place	2000 Paris	‍–‍73 kg
Gold medal – first place	2000 Munchen	‍–‍73 kg
Gold medal – first place	2002 Munchen	‍–‍73 kg
Bronze medal – third place	2002 Paris	‍–‍73 kg
Bronze medal – third place	2002 Moscow	‍–‍73 kg
Bronze medal – third place	2003 Paris	‍–‍73 kg

Profile at external judo databases
- IJF: 53112
- JudoInside.com: 368
- Last updated on: 30 October 2024

Ferrid Kheder (born 3 March 1975) is a French retired Olympic judoka who placed seventh at the Sydney Olympic Games and a former professional mixed martial artist who fought from 2004 to 2013. He holds the sixth Dan in IJF Judo and a BJJ black belt.

== Judo career ==
Kheder began training judo in 1979 at the age of four. He went on to train with the French Team from 1993 to 2001, and in the Tunisia Team from 2001 to 2004. He won twice the Paris Grand Slam (1999 and 2000) and the Dusseldorf Grand Slam (2000 and 2002). He won the european championship U21 in Spain (1995) and the European championship by Team (1996). He has medaled seven times in the Super World Cup and won many Opens and World Cups, he placed 3rd at the European Championship in 2000 and 7th at the 2000 Olympic Games.

== Mixed martial arts career ==
In 2004 Kheder started to add Muay Thai and grappling training to his judo background to compete in MMA with Fighting Klub Team (FK TEAM).

In 2005 he moved to Australia to continue his new journey.

In 2007 while fighting in Australia, a manager from the US contacted him and recruited him to join Team Quest in California. He later became contracted under the Bellator organization.

Between September 2008 and June 2011 Kheder won 13 of his 14 fights winning 11 fight by KO or Submission and losing only a decision (28-29) to Daisuke Nakamura at M-1 Global Presents Breakthrough on August 28, 2009.

His interest in BJJ grew through his MMA career during which he had the opportunity to train with some of the worlds best BJJ players.

In 2015 he earned his black belt while living in San Diego.

Today, he teaches Martial Arts.

=== Xtreme Vale Todo 5 controversy ===
There is some question as to if Kheder's alleged victory over Hermes Franca was rigged by a promoter, Lu Dwyer, during the Xtreme Vale Todo event that took place on December 19, 2010. In addition to the fight's announcer, all three judges, and the referee had scored the bout in favor of Franca. Regardless of the judges' scores, Dwyer declared Kheder the victor, and another promoter raised Kheder's hand in victory after the referee refused to do so.

There is a potential conflict of interest due to the fact that Kheder is primarily sponsored by Dwyer and her business J & L Irrigation. Dwyer sponsors "Team FK" by paying his living expenses and taking a percentage of his winnings.

Days after his controversial decision win Kheder posted on his Facebook page that Dwyer overturned the fight result to a "No Contest" and suggested a 5 round rematch, presumably in the same promotion.

The rematch never happened since Hermes Franca found guilty in the sexual abuse of a child under 14 years of age in 2012 and has been sentenced to 42 months in prison.

=== Bellator ===
In 2010 Kheder was supposed to fight in Bellator's Lightweight Tournament but due to a case of appendicitis, he has been forced out of the eight-man field and has been replaced by WEC veteran James Krause.

In 2011 Kheder was 1 kg too heavy and refused to step onto the scale to be weighed and was instead removed from the tournament which allowed Josh Shockley to take Kheder's place.

== Judo achievements ==
Year	Tournament	Place	Weight class
2003	Paris Super World Cup	3rd	Lightweight (73 kg)
2002	Paris Super World Cup	3rd	Lightweight (73 kg)
2002	Moscow Super World Cup	3rd	Lightweight (73 kg)
2002	Dusseldorf Super World Cup	1st	Lightweight (73 kg)
2000	Olympic Games	7th	Lightweight (73 kg)
2000	Paris Super World Cup	1st	Lightweight (73 kg)
2000	Munich Super World Cup	1st	Lightweight (73 kg)
2000	European Judo Championships	3rd	Lightweight (73 kg)
1999	Paris Super World Cup	1st	Lightweight (73 kg)
1998	World Judo Championships FISU	3rd	Lightweight (73 kg)
1997	European Judo Cup by Team	1st	Lightweight (73 kg)
1996	European Judo Championships by Team	1st	Lightweight (71 kg)
1995	European Judo Championships U23	1st	Lightweight (71 kg)

== Mixed martial arts record ==
Professional record breakdown
34 matches	22 wins	11 losses
By knockout	8	5
By submission	11	0
By decision	3	6
No contests	1	

Res.	Record	Opponent	Method	Event	Date	Round	Time	Location	Notes
Loss	22–11 (1)	Vincent del Guerra	TKO (punch)	PFC 5 – Clash of the Titans	April 27, 2013	2	2:12	Marseille, France	
Win	22–10 (1)	Adrian Rodrigues	Submission (neck crank)	Shidokan Costa Rica – Live Super Fights	March 23, 2013	1	4:50	San Jose, Costa Rica	
Loss	21–10 (1)	Ronys Torres	TKO (punches)	Amazon Forest Combat 2	April 1, 2012	1	0:22	Amazonas, Brazil	Originally a 160 lb catchweight fight, Kheder weighed in 12 lbs over-weight.
Loss	21–9 (1)	Lim Hyun-Gyu	TKO (punches)	PXC – Pacific Xtreme Combat 27	October 29, 2011	1	N/A	Mangilao, Guam	
Loss	21–8 (1)	Aloisio Barros	TKO (doctor stoppage)	FF – Fight Fever 4	October 1, 2011	3	1:27	Luxembourg City, Luxembourg	
Loss	21–7 (1)	Yoshiyuki Yoshida	TKO (punches)	Fighting Marcou Arena 2	July 17, 2011	1	N/A	Palavas-les-Flots, Herault, France	
Loss	21–6 (1)	Zorobabel Moreira	Decision (unanimous)	Dare Championship 1/11	June 25, 2011	3	5:00	Bangkok, Thailand	Return to Welterweight
NC	21–5 (1)	Hermes França	NC (decision overturned by promoter)	Xtreme Vale Todo 5	December 19, 2010	3	5:00	Cartago, Costa Rica	Originally a win, the fight was turned to a "No Contest" after controversy following the bout, as all three judges scored the bout for França. Dropped to Lightweight.
Win	21–5	Steve Berger	TKO (punches)	MFL 3 – Mixed Fight League	September 25, 2010	2	1:16	Laval, Quebec, Canada	
Win	20–5	Randall Jimenez	Submission (rear-naked choke)	Saint-Tropez Promotions – Xtreme Vale Todo 4	June 26, 2010	2	2:50	Tamarindo, Costa Rica	
Win	19–5	Rudier Fuentes	Submission (armbar)	Vale Tudo Montecarlo	December 26, 2009	2	4:20	Guanacaste, Costa Rica	
Win	18–5	Rogelio Zuniga	Submission (armbar)	Vale Tudo Montecarlo	December 26, 2009	1	2:12	Guanacaste, Costa Rica	
Win	17–5	Randall Jimenez	TKO (retirement)	Saint-Tropez Promotions – Extreme Valetodo Tamarindo	November 28, 2009	1	5:00	Tamarindo, Costa Rica	
Loss	16–5	Daisuke Nakamura	Decision (unanimous)	M-1 Global: Breakthrough	August 28, 2009	3	5:00	Kansas City, Missouri, United States	159 lb Catchweight bout
Win	16–4	Jeffry Lopez	Decision (unanimous)	Fite Nite – Guerreros en la Torre	April 4, 2009	3	5:00	Costa Rica	
Win	15–4	Graydon Tannas	KO (punches)	UCW 15 – Massacre	March 13, 2009	3	0:18	Winnipeg, Manitoba, Canada	
Win	14–4	Calvett Huzinger	Submission	C3 Fights – C3 Fights	February 28, 2009	1	0:55	Newkirk, Oklahoma, United States	
Win	13–4	Drew Fickett	KO (punches)	C3 Fights – Knock-Out Rock-Out Weekend	January 30, 2009	3	2:02	Clinton, Oklahoma, United States	
Win	12–4	Elton Brown	Submission (rear-naked choke)	MMA Costa Rica – Bushido 2008	December 19, 2008	1	3:15	San Pedro, Costa Rica	
Win	11–4	Alejandro Solano Rodriguez	Decision (unanimous)	FN – Fite Nite	December 5, 2008	3	5:00	Desamparados Canton, Costa Rica	
Win	10–4	Vince Guzman	Submission (rear naked choke)	AF 2 – Apocalypse Fights 2	October 9, 2008	2	2:05	Palm Springs, California, United States	
Win	9–4	Douglas Noear	Submission (strikes)	C3 Fights – Clash in Concho	September 19, 2008	N/A	N/A	Concho, Oklahoma, United States	
Loss	8–4	Pedro Santos	Decision (unanimous)	Jungle Fight 11	September 13, 2008	3	5:00	Rio de Janeiro, Brazil	
Loss	8–3	Paulo Thiago	Decision (unanimous)	Jungle Fight 10	July 12, 2008	3	5:00	Rio de Janeiro, Brazil	
Win	8–2	Rory McDonell	Decision (unanimous)	UCW 11 – Hell in the Cage	April 11, 2008	3	5:00	Winnipeg, Manitoba, Canada	
Win	7–2	Christos Petroutsos	TKO (punches)	Shooto Belgium – New Batch	March 23, 2008	1	1:02	Charleroi, Belgium	
Loss	6–2	Tommy Truex	Decision (unanimous)	SF 21 – Seasons Beatings	December 22, 2007	3	5:00	Portland, Oregon, United States	
Win	6–1	Mike Neufeld	TKO (punches)	UCW 10 – X-Factor	November 30, 2007	2	N/A	Winnipeg, Manitoba, Canada	
Loss	5–1	Pono Pananganan	Decision (split)	GPG – Gracie Proving Ground	October 6, 2007	3	5:00	Honolulu, Hawaii, United States	
Win	5–0	Will Cunningham	KO (punch)	Cage Fighting Championship 1	July 28, 2007	2	2:49	Sydney, Australia	
Win	4–0	Laurent Poirier	Submission (armbar)	DF – Dumbea Fights	November 19, 2006	1	N/A	Noumea, New Caledonia	
Win	3–0	Dan Harper	KO (knee)	DF – Dumbea Fights	November 19, 2006	2	N/A	Noumea, New Caledonia	
Win	2–0	Gavin Murie	Submission (armbar)	XFC 12 – Oktoberfist	October 13, 2006	1	N/A	Australia	
Win	1–0	Fred Sanchez	Submission (armbar)	DY – Dojo Yaburi	May 14, 2005	1	3:00	Carmaux, Franca	
