= María Gabriela Franco =

Venezuelan sport shooter (born 1981)

Personal information
- Nationality: Venezuelan
- Born: 15 March 1981 (age 45)

Sport
- Sport: Shooting
Medal record
Representing Venezuela
Pan American Games
Silver medal – second place	1999 Winnipeg	10m air pistol
Central American and Caribbean Games
Silver medal – second place	1998 Maracaibo	10m air pistol
South American Games
Gold medal – first place	2002 Belem	10m air pistol
Gold medal – first place	2002 Belem	10m air pistol team
Gold medal – first place	2002 Belem	25m pistol team

María Gabriela Franco Álvarez aka Gabby Franco (born 15 March 1981) is a Venezuelan sport shooter. She started shooting air pistol and sport pistol since she was 11 years old. Her first international competition was the 1997 Bolivarian Games in Arequipa, Peru, where she won a silver medal, earning her a spot at the 1997 South American Olympic shooting tournament in Buenos Aires, Argentina.

In 1998 Maria Gabriela Franco won a silver medal at the 1998 Central American Games in Maracaibo, Venezuela, solidifying her international presence and her position as a member of the Venezuelan National Olympic Shooting Team.

She won a silver medal at the 1999 Pan-American Games in Winnipeg, Canada, making her the first Venezuelan female shooter to earn an Olympic spot.

She tied for 37th place in the women's 25 metre pistol event and tied for 39th place in the women's 10 metre air pistol event at the 2000 Summer Olympics.

Franco retired in 2002 after winning three gold medals (one individual gold medal in air pistol, and two team gold medals in air and sport pistol) at the 2002 South American Games in Rio de Janeiro, Brazil.
