= Abel Sánchez =

Peruvian diver

Personal information
- Full name: Abel Sánchez Vargas
- Nationality: Peruvian
- Born: 31 October 1971 (age 53); Lansing, Michigan, United States

Sport
- Sport: Diving

Abel Sánchez Vargas (born 31 October 1971) is a Peruvian diver. He competed in two events at the 2000 Summer Olympics.
