= Sebastián Alquati =

Argentinian Olympic judoka (born 1976)

Sebastián Alquati (born 20 May 1976) is an Argentine former judoka who competed in the 1996 Summer Olympics and in the 2000 Summer Olympics.
