= Germán Velasco =

Peruvian judoka

Personal information
- Born: 31 May 1979 (age 47)
- Occupation: Judoka

Sport
- Country: Peru
- Sport: Judo
- Weight class: –73 kg

Achievements and titles
- Olympic Games: 13th (2000)
- World Champ.: 7th (2001)
- Pan American Champ.: (1999, 2001)
Medal record
Men's judo
Representing Peru
Pan American Championships
Bronze medal – third place	1999 Montevideo	–73 kg
Bronze medal – third place	2001 Cordoba	–73 kg
World Juniors Championships
Silver medal – second place	1998 Cali	–73 kg
Pan American Junior Championships
Gold medal – first place	1998 Maracaibo	–73 kg

Profile at external databases
- IJF: 4117
- JudoInside.com: 3227
- Updated on 10 January 2023

Germán Velasco (born 31 May 1979) is a Peruvian judoka. He competed in the men's lightweight event at the 2000 Summer Olympics.
