= Giuseppe Maddaloni =

Italian judoka (born 1976)

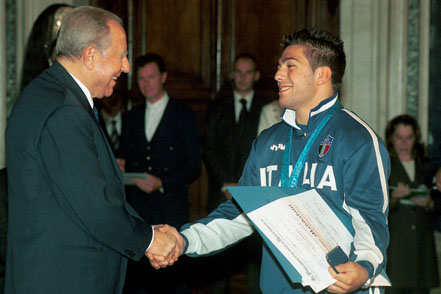
- Maddaloni (right)

Personal information
- Born: 10 July 1976 (age 49) Naples, Italy
- Occupation: Judoka

Sport
- Country: Italy
- Sport: Judo
- Weight class: –73 kg, –81 kg
- Club: Fiamme Oro

Achievements and titles
- Olympic Games: (gold) (2000)
- World Champ.: 5th (2007)
- European Champ.: (gold) (1998, 1999)
Medal record
Men's judo
Representing Italy
Olympic Games
Gold medal – first place	2000 Sydney	‍–‍73 kg
European Championships
Gold medal – first place	1998 Oviedo	‍–‍73 kg
Gold medal – first place	1999 Bratislava	‍–‍73 kg
Silver medal – second place	2001 Paris	‍–‍73 kg
Silver medal – second place	2006 Tampere	‍–‍81 kg
Bronze medal – third place	2002 Maribor	‍–‍73 kg
Bronze medal – third place	2008 Lisbon	‍–‍81 kg
World Juniors Championships
Silver medal – second place	1996 Porto	‍–‍71 kg

Profile at external databases
- IJF: 10002
- JudoInside.com: 6513
- Updated on 31 May 2023

Giuseppe Maddaloni (born 10 July 1976) is an Italian judoka. He was born in Naples.

He won a gold medal in the lightweight (‍–‍73 kg) division at the 2000 Summer Olympics.

He was trained by his father Gianni Maddaloni, in the district of Scampia, the Neapolitan region of Italy.

== In popular culture ==
In 2014 a movie was made about his life and that of his father, called it:L'oro di Scampia (the gold of Scampia), in 2022 it was streaming on Netflix.

In 2018 the International Judo Federation made a movie about his father and the work he continues to do called Judo for the World - Italy.

== Achievements ==
Year	Tournament	Place	Weight class
2008	European Championships	3rd	Half middleweight (81 kg)
2007	World Judo Championships	5th	Half middleweight (81 kg)
2006	European Judo Championships	2nd	Half middleweight (81 kg)
2005	Mediterranean Games	1st	Half middleweight (81 kg)
2002	European Judo Championships	3rd	Lightweight (73 kg)
2001	European Judo Championships	2nd	Lightweight (73 kg)
2000	Olympic Games	1st	Lightweight (73 kg)
1999	European Judo Championships	1st	Lightweight (73 kg)
1998	European Judo Championships	1st	Lightweight (73 kg)
1997	Mediterranean Games	3rd	Lightweight (71 kg)
