= Vsevolods Zeļonijs =

Latvian judoka (born 1973)

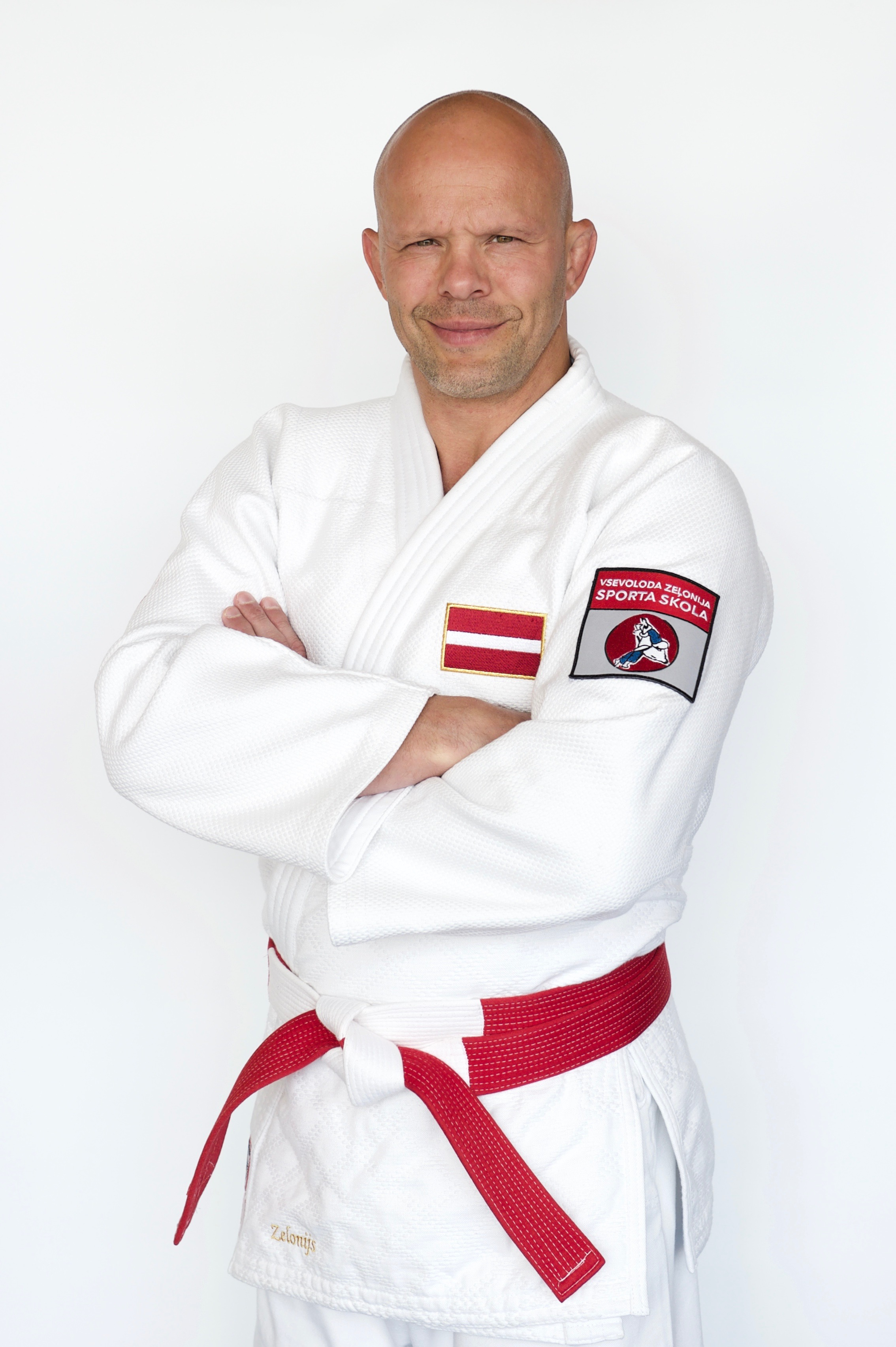

Personal information
- Born: 24 February 1973 (age 53)
- Occupation: Judoka

Sport
- Country: Latvia
- Sport: Judo
- Weight class: –65 kg, –71 kg, –73 kg

Achievements and titles
- Olympic Games: (bronze) (2000)
- World Champ.: (bronze) (1997)
- European Champ.: (silver) (1992, 1993, 1995)
Medal record
Men's judo
Representing Latvia
Olympic Games
Bronze medal – third place	2000 Sydney	‍–‍73 kg
World Championships
Bronze medal – third place	1997 Paris	‍–‍71 kg
European Championships
Silver medal – second place	1992 Paris	‍–‍65 kg
Silver medal – second place	1993 Athens	‍–‍65 kg
Silver medal – second place	1995 Birmingham	‍–‍65 kg
Bronze medal – third place	2002 Maribor	‍–‍73 kg
Bronze medal – third place	2004 Bucharest	‍–‍73 kg
European Junior Championships
Bronze medal – third place	1992 Jerusalem	‍–‍65 kg
Bronze medal – third place	1993 Arnhem	‍–‍71 kg

Profile at external databases
- IJF: 4487
- JudoInside.com: 3059
- Updated on 31 May 2023

Vsevolods Zeļonijs (born 24 February 1973 in Riga) is a Latvian judoka, who competed in the 1992 and 2000 Summer Olympics, winning bronze medal in 2000 in the lightweight (‍–‍73 kg) category.

Zeļonijs also won a bronze medal in the 1997 World Championships, and several silver and bronze medals in European Championships. He is a four-time Olympian. Between 1992 and 2004, he won eight medals (three silver and five bronze) at the World Championships, European Championships and European Junior Championships.
