= Judo at the 2000 Summer Olympics =

Judo Judo at the Games of the XXVII Olympiad
- Venue: Sydney Convention and Exhibition Centre
- Location: Sydney, Australia
- Dates: 16 to 22 September 2000

Competition at external databases
- Links: IJF • JudoInside

This is list of final results for the Judo events at the 2000 Summer Olympics:

== Medal table ==
* Host nation (Australia)

Rank	Nation	Gold	Silver	Bronze	Total
1	Japan	4	2	2	8
2	France	2	2	2	6
3	Cuba	2	2	1	5
4	China	2	1	1	4
5	Italy	1	0	3	4
6	Netherlands	1	0	0	1
6	Spain	1	0	0	1
6	Turkey	1	0	0	1
9	South Korea	0	2	3	5
10	Brazil	0	2	0	2
11	Russia	0	1	2	3
12	Canada	0	1	0	1
12	Great Britain	0	1	0	1
14	Belgium	0	0	2	2
14	Estonia	0	0	2	2
16	Australia*	0	0	1	1
16	Belarus	0	0	1	1
16	Georgia	0	0	1	1
16	Germany	0	0	1	1
16	Kyrgyzstan	0	0	1	1
16	Latvia	0	0	1	1
16	North Korea	0	0	1	1
16	Portugal	0	0	1	1
16	Romania	0	0	1	1
16	Ukraine	0	0	1	1
Totals (25 entries)		14	14	28	56

== Medal summary ==
=== Men's events ===
Games	Gold	Silver	Bronze
Extra lightweight 60 kg	Tadahiro Nomura; Japan	Jung Bu-kyung; South Korea	Manolo Poulot; Cuba
Extra lightweight 60 kg	Tadahiro Nomura; Japan	Jung Bu-kyung; South Korea	Aidyn Smagulov; Kyrgyzstan
Half lightweight 66 kg	Hüseyin Özkan; Turkey	Larbi Benboudaoud; France	Girolamo Giovinazzo; Italy
Half lightweight 66 kg	Hüseyin Özkan; Turkey	Larbi Benboudaoud; France	Giorgi Vazagashvili; Georgia
Lightweight; 73 kg	Giuseppe Maddaloni; Italy	Tiago Camilo; Brazil	Anatoly Laryukov; Belarus
Lightweight; 73 kg	Giuseppe Maddaloni; Italy	Tiago Camilo; Brazil	Vsevolods Zeļonijs; Latvia
Half middleweight 81 kg	Makoto Takimoto; Japan	Cho In-chul; South Korea	Nuno Delgado; Portugal
Half middleweight 81 kg	Makoto Takimoto; Japan	Cho In-chul; South Korea	Aleksei Budõlin; Estonia
Middleweight; 90 kg	Mark Huizinga; Netherlands	Carlos Honorato; Brazil	Frédéric Demontfaucon; France
Middleweight; 90 kg	Mark Huizinga; Netherlands	Carlos Honorato; Brazil	Ruslan Mashurenko; Ukraine
Half heavyweight 100 kg	Kosei Inoue; Japan	Nicolas Gill; Canada	Yuri Stepkine; Russia
Half heavyweight 100 kg	Kosei Inoue; Japan	Nicolas Gill; Canada	Stéphane Traineau; France
Heavyweight +100 kg	David Douillet; France	Shinichi Shinohara; Japan	Indrek Pertelson; Estonia
Heavyweight +100 kg	David Douillet; France	Shinichi Shinohara; Japan	Tamerlan Tmenov; Russia

=== Women's events ===
Games	Gold	Silver	Bronze
Extra lightweight 48 kg	Ryoko Tamura; Japan	Lioubov Brouletova; Russia	Anna-Maria Gradante; Germany
Extra lightweight 48 kg	Ryoko Tamura; Japan	Lioubov Brouletova; Russia	Ann Simons; Belgium
Half lightweight 52 kg	Legna Verdecia; Cuba	Noriko Narazaki; Japan	Kye Sun-Hi; North Korea
Half lightweight 52 kg	Legna Verdecia; Cuba	Noriko Narazaki; Japan	Liu Yuxiang; China
Lightweight; 57 kg	Isabel Fernández; Spain	Driulis González; Cuba	Kie Kusakabe; Japan
Lightweight; 57 kg	Isabel Fernández; Spain	Driulis González; Cuba	Maria Pekli; Australia
Half middleweight 63 kg	Séverine Vandenhende; France	Li Shufang; China	Gella Vandecaveye; Belgium
Half middleweight 63 kg	Séverine Vandenhende; France	Li Shufang; China	Jung Sung-sook; South Korea
Middleweight; 70 kg	Sibelis Veranes; Cuba	Kate Howey; Great Britain	Cho Min-sun; South Korea
Middleweight; 70 kg	Sibelis Veranes; Cuba	Kate Howey; Great Britain	Ylenia Scapin; Italy
Half heavyweight 78 kg	Tang Lin; China	Céline Lebrun; France	Simona Richter; Romania
Half heavyweight 78 kg	Tang Lin; China	Céline Lebrun; France	Emanuela Pierantozzi; Italy
Heavyweight +78 kg	Yuan Hua; China	Daima Beltrán; Cuba	Kim Seon-young; South Korea
Heavyweight +78 kg	Yuan Hua; China	Daima Beltrán; Cuba	Mayumi Yamashita; Japan

== Participating nations ==
A total of 386 Judokas from 89 countries competed in the 2000 Summer Olympics.

- Algeria (7)
- Argentina (9)
- Armenia (1)
- Aruba (1)
- Australia (14)
- Austria (3)
- Azerbaijan (3)
- Barbados (1)
- Belarus (5)
- Belgium (9)
- Bosnia and Herzegovina (1)
- Brazil (12)
- Bulgaria (2)
- Cameroon (3)
- Canada (6)
- Chile (1)
- China (11)
- Chinese Taipei (6)
- Republic of the Congo (1)
- Cuba (14)
- Czech Republic (3)
- Ivory Coast (3)
- Dominican Republic (5)
- North Korea (5)
- Ecuador (2)
- Egypt (3)
- El Salvador (1)
- Estonia (2)
- Fiji (2)
- Finland (1)
- France (14)
- Gabon (2)
- Georgia (6)
- Germany (11)
- Great Britain (9)
- Guatemala (1)
- Guinea (1)
- Haiti (1)
- Hungary (6)
- India (1)
- Indonesia (2)
- Iran (3)
- Israel (3)
- Italy (9)
- Japan (14)
- Kazakhstan (8)
- Kyrgyzstan (1)
- Latvia (1)
- Liechtenstein (1)
- Lithuania (1)
- Madagascar (1)
- Mali (1)
- Malta (1)
- Mauritius (1)
- Mexico (1)
- Mongolia (8)
- Morocco (2)
- Moldova (4)
- Netherlands (10)
- New Zealand (3)
- Nigeria (1)
- Panama (1)
- Peru (1)
- Poland (4)
- Portugal (6)
- Puerto Rico (4)
- Romania (7)
- Russia (10)
- Samoa (1)
- Senegal (1)
- Seychelles (1)
- Slovakia (1)
- South Africa (1)
- South Korea (12)
- Spain (12)
- Sweden (2)
- Switzerland (4)
- Togo (1)
- Tunisia (9)
- Turkey (3)
- Turkmenistan (2)
- Ukraine (6)
- United States (13)
- Uruguay (1)
- Uzbekistan (6)
- Venezuela (9)
- FR Yugoslavia (1)

== Qualification ==
An NOC may enter up to one athlete per weight category. The qualifying places were allocated as follows:

Event/Union		Location	Men	Women	Totals
World Championships		(United Kingdom) Birmingham	8	8	112
Unions	African Judo Union	—	3	2	35
Unions	Judo Union of Asia	—	5	3	56
Unions	European Judo Union	—	9	5	98
Unions	Oceania Judo Union	—	1	1	14
Unions	Pan American Judo Union	—	6	3	63
Host Nation (AUS)		—	4	3	7
Tripartite Commission Invitation places		—			15
TOTAL					400
