= Hassen Moussa =

Tunisian judoka (born 1973)

Medal record

Men's judo

All-Africa Games
Gold medal – first place	1999 Johannesburg	73 kg

Hassen Moussa (born 14 January 1973) is a Tunisian judoka. He competed at the 1996 Summer Olympics and the 2000 Summer Olympics.
