= Michel Almeida =

Portuguese judoka (born 1974)

Personal information
- Born: 28 September 1974 (age 52) Lisbon, Portugal
- Occupation: Judoka

Sport
- Sport: Judo
Medal record
Men's Judo
Representing Portugal
European Championships
Gold medal – first place	2000 Wroclaw	73 kg
Summer Universiade
Bronze medal – third place	1999 Palma de Mallorca	73 kg

Profile at external databases
- JudoInside.com: 5708

Michel de Sousa Fernandes Alcobia de Almeida (born 28 September 1974) is a Portuguese judoka. He competed at the 1996 Summer Olympics and the 2000 Summer Olympics.

== Achievements ==
Year	Tournament	Place	Weight class
2000	Olympic Games	7th	Lightweight (73 kg)
2000	European Judo Championships	1st	Lightweight (73 kg)
1999	Universiade	3rd	Lightweight (73 kg)
1997	European Judo Championships	7th	Half lightweight (65 kg)

== See also ==
- Judo in Canada
- List of Canadian judoka
