= Choi Yong-sin =

Olympic judoka

Personal information
- Nationality: Korean
- Born: 21 May 1978 (age 48)

Sport
- Country: South Korea
- Sport: Judo
Medal record
Men's judo
Representing South Korea
Summer Universiade
Silver medal – second place	2001 Beijing	73 kg
Asian Games
Gold medal – first place	2002 Busan	73 kg

- Choi Yong-sin
- Hangul: 최용신
- RR: Choe Yongsin
- MR: Ch'oe Yongsin

Choi Yong-sin (born 21 May 1978) is a Korean former judoka who competed in the 2000 Summer Olympics.
