= Judo at the 2000 Summer Olympics – Women's 57 kg =

Women's 57 kg at the Games of the XXVII Olympiad
- Venue: Sydney Convention and Exhibition Centre
- Date: 18 September 2000
- Competitors: 23 from 23 nations

Medalists
1st place, gold medalist(s)		Isabel Fernández	Spain
2nd place, silver medalist(s)		Driulis González	Cuba
3rd place, bronze medalist(s)		Kie Kusakabe	Japan
3rd place, bronze medalist(s)		Maria Pekli	Australia

These are the results of the women's 57 kg (also known as lightweight) competition in judo at the 2000 Summer Olympics in Sydney. A total number of 23 women qualified for this event, limited to jūdōka whose body weight was less than, or equal to, 57 kilograms. The competition took place in the Sydney Convention and Exhibition Centre on 18 September.

== Competitors ==
Athlete	Nation
Kie Kusakabe	Japan
Cheryle Peel	Great Britain
Isabel Fernández	Spain
Khishigbatyn Erdenet-Od	Mongolia
Ellen Wilson	United States
Françoise Nguele	Cameroon
Zülfiyyə Hüseynova	Azerbaijan
Maria Pekli	Australia
Pernilla Andersson	Sweden
Jessica Gal	Netherlands
Ludmila Cristea	Moldova
Michaela Vernerová	Czech Republic
Cinzia Cavazzuti	Italy
Shen Jun	China
Filipa Cavalleri	Portugal
Michelle Buckingham	Canada
Tânia Ferreira	Brazil
Marisabel Lomba	Belgium
Rose Marie Kouaho	Ivory Coast
Orit Bar-On	Israel
Driulis González	Cuba
Laurie Pace	Malta
Barbara Harel	France

== Main bracket ==
The gold and silver medalists were determined by the final match of the main single-elimination bracket.

Round of 32
Isabel Fernández (ESP)	W
Khishigbatyn Erdenet-Od (MGL)	L
Zülfiyyə Hüseynova (AZE)	L
Maria Pekli (AUS)	W
Jessica Gal (NED)	W
Ludmila Cristea (MDA)	L
Micheala Vernerová (CZE)	L
Cinzia Cavazzuti (ITA)	W
Michelle Buckingham (CAN)	L
Tânia Ferreira (BRA)	W
Marisabel Lomba (BEL)	W
Rose Marie Kouaho (CIV)	L
Laurie Pace (MLT)	L
Barbara Harel (FRA)	W

Round of 16
Kie Kusakabe (JPN)	W
Cheryle Peel (GBR)	L
Isabel Fernández (ESP)	W
Ellen Wilson (USA)	L
Françoise Nguele (CMR)	L
Maria Pekli (AUS)	W
Pernilla Andersson (SWE)	W
Jessica Gal (NED)	L
Cinzia Cavazzuti (ITA)	W
Filipa Cavalleri (POR)	L
Tânia Ferreira (BRA)	L
Shen Jun (CHN)	W
Marisabel Lomba (BEL)	W
Orit Bar On (ISR)	L
Driulis González (CUB)	W
Barbara Harel (FRA)	L

Quarterfinals
Kie Kusakabe (JPN)	L
Isabel Fernández (ESP)	W
Maria Pekli (AUS)	W
Pernilla Andersson (SWE)	L
Cinzia Cavazzuti (ITA)	L
Shen Jun (CHN)	W
Marisabel Lomba (BEL)	L
Driulis González (CUB)	W

Semifinals
Isabel Fernández (ESP)	W
Maria Pekli (AUS)	L
Shen Jun (CHN)	L
Driulis González (CUB)	W

Gold medal final
Isabel Fernández (ESP)	W
Driulis González (CUB)	L

=== Repechage ===
The losing semifinalists as well as those judoka eliminated in earlier rounds by the four semifinalists of the main bracket advanced to the repechage. These matches determined the two bronze medalists for the event.

First round
Erdenet-Od (MGL)	W
Wilson (USA)	L
Hüseynova (AZE)	W
Nguele (CMR)	L
Ferreira (BRA)	W
Bye	L
Harel (FRA)	W
Bye	L

Second round
Erdenet-Od (MGL)	L
Kusakabe (JPN)	W
Hüseynova (AZE)	W
Andersson (SWE)	L
Ferreira (BRA)	L
Cavazzuti (ITA)	W
Harel (FRA)	W
Lomba (BEL)	L

Third round
Kusakabe (JPN)	W
Hüseynova (AZE)	L
Cavazzuti (ITA)	W
Harel (FRA)	L

Bronze medal finals
Kusakabe (JPN)	W
Shen (CHN)	L
Cavazzuti (ITA)	L
Pekli (AUS)	W
