= Deborah Gravenstijn =

Dutch judoka (born 1974)

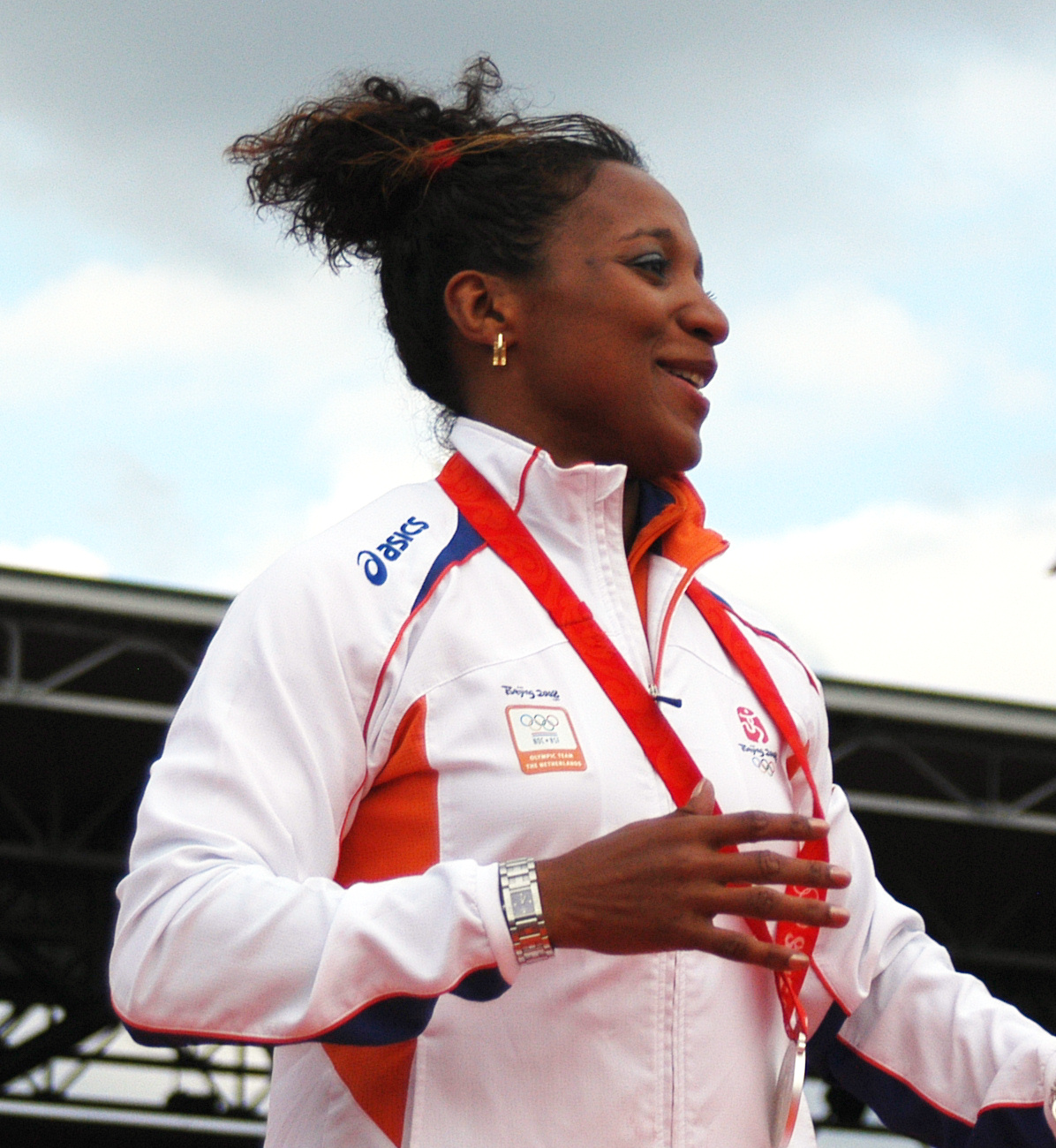

Personal information
- Born: 20 August 1974 (age 51)
- Occupation: Judoka

Sport
- Country: Netherlands
- Sport: Judo
- Weight class: ‍–‍52 kg, ‍–‍57 kg

Achievements and titles
- Olympic Games: (silver) (2008)
- World Champ.: (silver) (2001)
- European Champ.: (silver) (2001)
Medal record
Women's judo
Representing the Netherlands
Olympic Games
Silver medal – second place	2008 Beijing	‍–‍57 kg
Bronze medal – third place	2004 Athens	‍–‍57 kg
World Championships
Silver medal – second place	2001 Munich	‍–‍57 kg
Bronze medal – third place	2003 Osaka	‍–‍57 kg
European Championships
Silver medal – second place	2001 Paris	‍–‍57 kg
Bronze medal – third place	1998 Oviedo	‍–‍57 kg
Bronze medal – third place	1999 Bratislava	‍–‍52 kg
Bronze medal – third place	2000 Wrocław	‍–‍52 kg
Bronze medal – third place	2002 Maribor	‍–‍57 kg
World Juniors Championships
Silver medal – second place	1992 Buenos Aires	‍–‍61 kg
European Junior Championships
Gold medal – first place	1992 Jerusalem	‍–‍61 kg

Profile at external databases
- IJF: 26593
- JudoInside.com: 40
- Updated on 30 May 2023

Dibora Monick Olga "Deborah" Gravenstijn (born 20 August 1974 in Tholen, Zeeland) is a Dutch judoka and Captain in the Royal Netherlands Air Force. She won a bronze medal in the class Women's 57 kg at the 2004 Summer Olympics and a silver medal four years later at the same event at the 2008 Summer Olympics in Beijing.

== Biography ==
=== Early years ===
Gravenstijn started her judo career when she was five years old. Although she and her family lived in Rotterdam they always joined her to tournaments held anywhere within the Netherlands. As soon as Gravenstijn participated in international tournaments, her family was unable to keep up with attending every tournament, however they did whatever they could to support Deborah.

She earned her first medal at a Dutch Junior Championship (under 18/21) in 1987 when she came in third in Assen. One month later, she won her first title at the Dutch Cadet Championship (under 16/18) in Elburg. In the following years she was unable to retain the title, but still managed to win a bronze (in Haarlem, 1988) and a silver medal (in Heerlen, 1989). At international level she won her first tournament in Arlon in 1990, the Belgian Open. She won a bronze medal at the Dutch All Categories Championships in Nieuwegein in 1991 and she won the gold medal at the Under-19 championships in Geleen; She also retained her Belgian Open title in Arlon and won the silver medal at the Dutch Championships in Den Bosch. In 1992, her last year as a junior she became Dutch national champion again and she won a silver medal at the All Categories Championships. At international level she became third at the World Masters in Munich, won the silver medal at the World Junior Championships in Buenos Aires and won the European title at the European Championships in Jerusalem.

=== Success in the nineties ===
1993 was Gravenstijn's first year as a senior and in no-time she had adjusted to the national level by becoming third at the Dutch All Categories Championships and by winning the Rotterdam Open both in January. At the Dutch National Championships in Den Bosch she won the silver medal in November and in December she won her first international tournament as a senior, the Swiss International in Basel. She won another bronze at the All Categories championships and she retained her Rotterdam Open title. Besides that she did not book any other notable results in 1994. In 1995 she prepared and qualified for the European Championships in Trnava where she won the bronze medal. She completed the year with a silver medal at the Dutch National Championships. She won her first All Categories Championship in 1996 and managed to win two bronze medals, at the Dutch Open and the Dutch National Championships.

She became Dutch national champion for the first time in her career in 1997. Then in 1998 she became second at the Grand Prix Citta di Roma and at the Dutch Open. At the European Championships in Oviedo she won the bronze medal and she ended the year with a silver medal at the Dutch National Championships. She won the GP Citta di Roma in 1999 and won another bronze medal at the European Championships in Bratislava. With her team Kenamju she won the bronze medal in the European Club Cup final in Haarlem. In November 1999 she won her second Dutch national title.

=== Olympic success ===
Thanks to two second places at the A Tournament in Sofia and the Grand Prix in Leonding as well as two bronze medals at the Warsaw Judo Tournament and the European Championships in Wrocław Gravenstijn qualified for the 2000 Summer Olympics in Sydney. In her Olympic debut she reached the bronze medal contest, but did not manage to win the bout and ended up on the fifth position. Later that year she won her third national title and she became second at the World University Championships in Málaga.

The Olympic result encouraged her to perform well in 2001. She became second at the Grand Prix in Leonding and won the Grand Prix in Prague. At the European Championships in Paris she reached the final, but had to be satisfied with silver. She then went on to win another silver at the World Championships in Munich and in between she won an international event in Venray. At the World Military Championships in Ostia she had to be satisfied with a bronze medal, while she finished the year with a second position in the Fukuoka Tournament in Japan. Gravenstijn suffered from an injury in 2002, but still managed to win the bronze medal at the European Championships in Maribor. She became third at the Dutch Open in Rotterdam in 2003 and won the British Open in Burgess Hill and the international tournament in Venray. At the World Championships in Osaka she became third.

2004 was all about the 2004 Summer Olympics in Athens. Gravenstijn qualified for the Olympics by becoming third at the A Tournament in Rome and first in Tallinn. In the first three rounds she was too strong for Cinzia Cavazzuti, Ellen Wilson and Danielle Zangrando, which earned her a spot in the semi-final. Yvonne Bönisch won the semi-final and eventually went on to win the gold medal against Kye Sun-Hui in the final. Gravenstijn on her turn beat Barbara Harel in the final of the repechages to take the bronze medal.

=== Tragedies ===
Two months after Gravenstijn won the bronze medal at the Olympics her younger sister Merghery died. Still she finished the year 2004 with a Dutch Championship title in Rotterdam. She was also awarded the Faas Wilkes Trophy. In 2005, she started with a third place at the Super World Cup in Hamburg and she became second in the World Cup in Rotterdam. At the European Championships, also held in Rotterdam she became seventh.

In May 2005 she fell during a match and suffered a double neck hernia. A return to the tatami was very unlikely, but she was determined to return and fought hard to make her comeback. One month before she eventually made her comeback in March 2007 her mother Carmen died, her second loss in her direct family since she won her Olympic medal.

=== Comeback ===
Her comeback to the international judo circuit was no success from the start. The death of her family members and her recent injuries still had a huge impact on her performances. Also due to these happenings her coach Jan de Rooij was no longer able to give her the aggression she needed to compete. National coach Marjolein van Unen took over from De Rooij in February 2008. Since then Gravestijn achieved a total of three top 5 rankings in World Cup meetings, inclusive the second place in Budapest and the first place in Warsaw. During the 2008 European Judo Championships in Lisbon she qualified for the 2008 Summer Olympics. She lost in the second round of the tournament after a mistake made by the referee, who changed the score of her match the exact other way, just 40 seconds before the end of the match. Thanks to one of her main rivals in former years Isabel Fernández who eliminated Inga Kolodziej just four seconds before the end of the game Gravenstijn qualified for the Olympics. Due to Fernandez's win Gravenstijn remained on top op Kolodziej for the Olympic rankings. One month before the start of the Olympics she was hit by a medicine ball during a training session. The ball which weights 5 kilograms landed with a high speed at her head, giving her recently recovered neck another big smack. The injury almost forced her to miss the Olympics, but Gravenstijn recovered faster than expected.

At the 2008 Summer Olympics in Beijing Gravenstijn had a bye in the first round and defeated Ketleyn Quadros in the second round. In the quarter-finals she faced Fernandez and in a tactical game with just one koka Gravenstijn advanced to the semi-finals in which she won against local hero Xu Yan. In the final and gold medal match Giulia Quintavalle won with a yuko and left Gravenstijn with the silver medal. Afterwards Gravenstijn dedicated the medal to her deceased sister and mother as well as to her still living family members.

She has a daughter with Mark Earle.

Awards
Preceded by Elisabeth Willeboordse	Rotterdam Sportswoman of the Year; 2008	Succeeded by Marhinde Verkerk
