= Jeny Rodriguez =

Honduran judoka

Jeny Rodríguez
Personal information
- Full name: Jeny Rodríguez
- Nationality: Honduran
- Born: 7 August 1975 (age 50)

Sport
- Sport: Judo

Jeny Rodríguez (born 7 August 1975) is a Honduran judoka. As an athlete, she represented Honduras in international competition. She competed for Honduras at the 1996 Summer Olympics in the women's lightweight event. There, she placed equal 20th out of the 22 judokas that competed in the event.

== Biography ==
Jeny Rodríguez was born on 7 August 1975 in Honduras. As an athlete, she competed in judo for Honduras in international competition.

Rodríguez was selected to compete for Honduras at the 1996 Summer Olympics in Atlanta, United States. At the 1996 Summer Games, she was entered to compete in one event, the women's lightweight event in judo. She was one of the first women to represent Honduras in judo at the Olympic Games alongside Dora Maldonado. The event was limited to competitors who weighed 56 kilograms (123 lb) or less. The judo events were held in Hall H of the Georgia World Congress Center. Rodríguez competed in the first round of Pool A of her event on 24 July 1996 against Mária Pekli of Hungary in the second match. There, Rodríguez was defeated by ippon and did not qualify further to the quarterfinals held a few hours later. Pekli competed until the semi-finals before being relegated to the repechage round and was then eliminated. The podium was gold for Driulis González of Cuba, silver for Jung Sun-yong of South Korea, and bronze for Isabel Fernández of Spain and Marisabel Lomba of Belgium. Overall, Rodríguez placed equal 20th alongside Ursula Myrén of Sweden and Raoudha Chaari of Tunisia out of the 22 competitors that participated in the event.
