= Judo at the 2004 Summer Olympics – Women's 57 kg =

Women's 57 kg at the Games of the XXVIII Olympiad
- Venue: Ano Liossia Olympic Hall
- Dates: 16 August 2004
- Competitors: 23 from 23 nations
- Winning score: 0011

Medalists
1st place, gold medalist(s)		Yvonne Bönisch	Germany
2nd place, silver medalist(s)		Kye Sun-hui	North Korea
3rd place, bronze medalist(s)		Yurisleydis Lupetey	Cuba
3rd place, bronze medalist(s)		Deborah Gravenstijn	Netherlands

Women's 57 kg competition in judo at the 2004 Summer Olympics was held on August 16 at the Ano Liossia Olympic Hall.

This event was the third-lightest of the women's judo weight classes, limiting competitors to a maximum of 57 kilograms of body mass. Like all other judo events, bouts lasted five minutes. If the bout was still tied at the end, it was extended for another five-minute, sudden-death period; if neither judoka scored during that period, the match is decided by the judges. The tournament bracket consisted of a single-elimination contest culminating in a gold medal match. There was also a repechage to determine the winners of the two bronze medals. Each judoka who had lost to a semifinalist competed in the repechage. The two judokas who lost in the semifinals faced the winner of the opposite half of the bracket's repechage in bronze medal bouts.

== Schedule ==
All times are Greece Standard Time (UTC+2)

Date	Time	Round
Monday, 16 August 2004	10:30; 13:00; 17:00	Preliminaries; Repechage; Final

== Qualifying athletes ==
Mat	Athlete	Country
1	Catherine Ekuta	Nigeria
1	Maria Pekli	Australia
1	Lena Göldi	Switzerland
1	Barbara Harel	France
1	Yurisleydis Lupetey	Cuba
1	Ioulieta Boukouvala	Greece
1	Sophie Cox	Great Britain
1	Elina Nasaudrodro	Fiji
1	Natalia Yukhareva	Russia
1	Kye Sun-hui	North Korea
1	Marcon Bezzina	Malta
2	Ellen Wilson	United States
2	Deborah Gravenstijn	Netherlands
2	Cinzia Cavazzuti	Italy
2	Lila Latrous	Algeria
2	Liu Yuxiang	China
2	Danielle Zangrando	Brazil
2	Kie Kusakabe	Japan
2	Rudymar Fleming	Venezuela
2	Khishigbatyn Erdenet-Od	Mongolia
2	Jessica García	Puerto Rico
2	Yvonne Bönisch	Germany
2	Isabel Fernández	Spain

== Tournament results ==
=== Final ===
Final
1	Kye Sun-hui (PRK)	0010
2	Yvonne Bönisch (GER)	0011

=== Mat 1 ===
Round of 32
Maria Pekli (AUS)	0000
Lena Göldi (SUI)	1131
Sophie Cox (GBR)	1010
Elina Nasaudrodro (FIJ)	0000
Kye Sun-hui (PRK)	1010
Marcon Bezzina (MLT)	0000

Round of 16
Catherine Ekuta (NGR)	0010
Lena Göldi (SUI)	1100
Barbara Harel (FRA)	0000
Yurisleydis Lupetey (CUB)	1000
Ioulieta Boukouvala (GRE)	0000
Sophie Cox (GBR)	0001
Natalia Yukhareva (RUS)	0010
Kye Sun-hui (PRK)	0031

Quarterfinals
Lena Göldi (SUI)
Yurisleydis Lupetey (CUB)	WO
Sophie Cox (GBR)	0010
Kye Sun-hui (PRK)	1010

Semifinals
Yurisleydis Lupetey (CUB)	0000
Kye Sun-hui (PRK)	1000

=== Mat 2 ===
Round of 32
Deborah Gravenstijn (NED)	1000
Cinzia Cavazzuti (ITA)	0001
Lila Latrous (ALG)	0011
Liu Yuxiang (CHN)	1100
Kie Kusakabe (JPN)	1000
Rudymar Fleming (VEN)	0000
Yvonne Bönisch (GER)	0121
Isabel Fernández (ESP)	0011

Round of 16
Ellen Wilson (USA)	0001
Deborah Gravenstijn (NED)	1011
Liu Yuxiang (CHN)	0011
Danielle Zangrando (BRA)	1000
Kie Kusakabe (JPN)	0020
Khishigbatyn Erdenet-Od (MGL)	0002
Jessica García (PUR)	0000
Yvonne Bönisch (GER)	1000

Quarterfinals
Deborah Gravenstijn (NED)	1010
Danielle Zangrando (BRA)	0010
Kie Kusakabe (JPN)	0000
Yvonne Bönisch (GER)	0200

Semifinals
Deborah Gravenstijn (NED)	0000
Yvonne Bönisch (GER)	1000

=== Repechage ===
Those judoka eliminated in earlier rounds by the four semifinalists of the main bracket advanced to the repechage. These matches determined the two bronze medalists for the event.

First round
Marcon Bezzina (MLT)	0000
Natalia Yukhareva (RUS)	1100
Cinzia Cavazzuti (ITA)	0011
Ellen Wilson (USA)	0001
Isabel Fernández (ESP)	1011
Jessica García (PUR)	0000

Second round
Barbara Harel (FRA)	WO
Lena Göldi (SUI)
Natalia Yukhareva (RUS)	1000
Sophie Cox (GBR)	0000
Cinzia Cavazzuti (ITA)	0010
Danielle Zangrando (BRA)	0000
Isabel Fernández (ESP)	0010
Kie Kusakabe (JPN)	0001

Third round
Barbara Harel (FRA)	0020
Natalia Yukhareva (RUS)	0001
Cinzia Cavazzuti (ITA)	0001
Isabel Fernández (ESP)	0010

Bronze medal finals
Barbara Harel (FRA)	0010
Deborah Gravenstijn (NED)	1000
Isabel Fernández (ESP)	0000
Yurisleydis Lupetey (CUB)	0010
