= Judo at the 1992 Summer Olympics – Women's 56 kg =

Judo at the Olympics

Women's 56 kg at the Games of the XXV Olympiad
- Venue: Palau Blaugrana
- Date: 31 July 1992
- Competitors: 23 from 23 nations

Medalists
1st place, gold medalist(s)		Miriam Blasco	Spain
2nd place, silver medalist(s)		Nicola Fairbrother	Great Britain
3rd place, bronze medalist(s)		Driulis González	Cuba
3rd place, bronze medalist(s)		Chiyori Tateno	Japan

The women's 56 kg competition in judo at the 1992 Summer Olympics in Barcelona was held on 31 July at the Palau Blaugrana. The gold medal was won by Miriam Blasco of Spain.

== Results ==
=== Main brackets ===
==== Pool A ====
Round of 32
Maria Pekli (HUN)	E
Jin Xianglan (CHN)	WAZ
Jemina Alves (BRA)	RA
Driulis González (CUB)	WIP
Gooitske Marsman (NED)	YUK
Inna Toropeyeva (EUN)	E
Altagracia Contreras (DOM)	E
Jung Sun-yong (KOR)	IPO

Round of 16
Jin Xianglan (CHN)	E
Ursula Myrén (SWE)	YUS
Driulis González (CUB)	YUS
Maria Gontowicz-Szałas (POL)	RA
Gooitske Marsman (NED)	E
Chiyori Tateno (JPN)	YUS
Jung Sun-yong (KOR)	RA
Miriam Blasco (ESP)	IPO

Quarterfinal
Ursula Myrén (SWE)	RA
Driulis González (CUB)	YUK
Chiyori Tateno (JPN)	RA
Miriam Blasco (ESP)	YUS

Semifinal
Driulis González (CUB)	RB
Miriam Blasco (ESP)	IPO

==== Pool B ====
Round of 32
Catherine Arnaud (FRA)	IPO
Pascale Mainville (CAN)	E
Gudrun Hausch (GER)	E
Barbara Eck (AUT)	WIP
Kate Donahoo (USA)	KOK
Maniliz Segarra (PUR)	E
Filipa Cavalleri (POR)	WO
Z. Blagojevic (IOA)	DNS

Round of 16
Catherine Arnaud (FRA)	IPO
Law Lai Wah (HKG)	E
Barbara Eck (AUT)	RB
Nicola Fairbrother (GBR)	KOK
Kate Donahoo (USA)	RB
Nicole Flagothier (BEL)	WAZ
Filipa Cavalleri (POR)	YUS
Prateep Pinitwong (THA)	E

Quarterfinal
Catherine Arnaud (FRA)	RB
Nicola Fairbrother (GBR)	WIP
Nicole Flagothier (BEL)	YUK
Filipa Cavalleri (POR)	RB

Semifinal
Nicola Fairbrother (GBR)	YUK
Nicole Flagothier (BEL)	RA

=== Repechages ===
==== Repechage A ====
Repechage round 1
Jemina Alves (BRA)	E
Maria Gontowicz-Szałas (POL)	IPO

Repechage quarterfinal
Maria Gontowicz-Szałas (POL)	YUK
Ursula Myrén (SWE)	E
Jung Sun-yong (KOR)	E
Chiyori Tateno (JPN)	IPO

Repechage semifinal
Maria Gontowicz-Szałas (POL)	E
Chiyori Tateno (JPN)	KOK

Repechage final
Chiyori Tateno (JPN)	IPO (bronze)
Nicole Flagothier (BEL)	E

==== Repechage B ====
Repechage round 1

Repechage quarterfinal
Barbara Eck (AUT)	E
Catherine Arnaud (FRA)	YUS
Kate Donahoo (USA)	WAZ
Filipa Cavalleri (POR)	E

Repechage semifinal
Catherine Arnaud (FRA)	E
Kate Donahoo (USA)	KOK

Repechage final
Kate Donahoo (USA)	E
Driulis González (CUB)	YUK (bronze)

=== Final ===
Final
Miriam Blasco (ESP)	YUK (gold)
Nicola Fairbrother (GBR)	2nd place, silver medalist(s)

== Final classification ==
Rank	Judoka	Nation
1st place, gold medalist(s)	Miriam Blasco	Spain
2nd place, silver medalist(s)	Nicola Fairbrother	Great Britain
3rd place, bronze medalist(s)	Driulis González	Cuba
3rd place, bronze medalist(s)	Chiyori Tateno	Japan
5T	Kate Donahoo	United States
5T	Nicole Flagothier	Belgium
7T	Catherine Arnaud	France
7T	Maria Gontowicz-Szałas	Poland
9T	Ursula Myrén	Sweden
9T	Jung Sun-yong	South Korea
9T	Barbara Eck	Austria
9T	Filipa Cavalleri	Portugal
13T	Jemina Alves	Brazil
14T	Jin Xianglan	China
14T	Gooitske Marsman	Netherlands
14T	Law Lai Wah	Hong Kong
14T	Prateep Pinitwong	Thailand
18T	Mária Pekli	Hungary
18T	Inna Toropeyeva	Unified Team
18T	Altagracia Contreras	Dominican Republic
18T	Pascale Mainville	Canada
18T	Gudrun Hausch	Germany
18T	Maniliz Segarra	Puerto Rico
