= 2003 European Judo Championships =

2003 Judo European Judo Championships
- Venue: Mitsubishi Electric Halle
- Location: Düsseldorf, Germany
- Dates: 16–18 May 2003

Competition at external databases
- Links: JudoInside

The 2003 European Judo Championships were the 14th edition of the European Judo Championships, and were held in Düsseldorf, Germany from 16 May to 18 May 2003.

== Medal overview ==
=== Men ===
| Event | Gold | Silver | Bronze |
|---|---|---|---|
| 60 kg | (Georgia (country)) Nestor Khergiani | (United Kingdom) Craig Fallon | (Armenia) Armen Nazaryan (Austria) Ludwig Paischer |
| 66 kg | (France) Benjamin Darbelet | (Georgia (country)) David Margoshvili | (Turkey) Hüseyin Özkan (Bulgaria) Georgi Georgiev |
| 73 kg | (Ukraine) Gennadiy Bilodid | (Spain) Kioshi Uematsu | (Belarus) Anatoly Laryukov (Poland) Krzysztof Wiłkomirski |
| 81 kg | (Switzerland) Sergei Aschwanden | (Portugal) Nuno Delgado | (Estonia) Aleksei Budõlin (Germany) Florian Wanner |
| 90 kg | (Ukraine) Valentyn Grekov | (Russia) Khasanbi Taov | (Netherlands) Mark Huizinga (Turkey) Özgür Yılmaz |
| 100 kg | (Israel) Ariel Ze'evi | (Netherlands) Elco van der Geest | (Hungary) Antal Kovács (Belarus) Ihar Makarau |
| +100 kg | (Russia) Tamerlan Tmenov | (Spain) Aythami Ruano | (Italy) Paolo Bianchessi (Belarus) Juri Rybak |
| Open class | (Russia) Aleksandr Mikhailine | (Netherlands) Dennis van der Geest | (Germany) Andreas Tölzer (Georgia (country)) Ramaz Chochosvili |

=== Women ===
| Event | Gold | Silver | Bronze |
|---|---|---|---|
| 48 kg | (Russia) Lioubov Brouletova | (Italy) Giuseppina Macri | (Belarus) Tatiana Moskvina (Belgium) Ann Simons |
| 52 kg | (France) Annabelle Euranie | (Slovenia) Petra Nareks | (Poland) Barbara Bukowska (United Kingdom) Georgina Singleton |
| 57 kg | (Spain) Isabel Fernández | (Switzerland) Lena Göldi | (United Kingdom) Sophie Cox (Austria) Sabrina Filzmoser |
| 63 kg | (Spain) Sara Álvarez | (Belgium) Gella Vandecaveye | (Austria) Claudia Heill (Italy) Ylenia Scapin |
| 70 kg | (Slovenia) Raša Sraka | (Germany) Heide Wollert | (Belgium) Catherine Jacques (Austria) Silvia Schlagnitweit |
| 78 kg | (Italy) Lucia Morico | (Spain) Raquel Prieto | (Germany) Jenny Karl (France) Céline Lebrun |
| +78 kg | (United Kingdom) Karina Bryant | (Russia) Tea Donguzashvili | (Belgium) Marie Elisabeth Veys (Germany) Sandra Köppen |
| Open class | (Germany) Katrin Beinroth | (Russia) Irina Rodina | (Slovenia) Lucija Polavder (Bulgaria) Tsvetana Bozhilova |

=== Medals table ===
| Rank | Nation | Gold | Silver | Bronze | Total |
|---|---|---|---|---|---|
| 1 | Russia | 3 | 3 | 0 | 6 |
| 2 | Spain | 2 | 3 | 0 | 5 |
| 3 | France | 2 | 0 | 1 | 3 |
| 4 | Ukraine | 2 | 0 | 0 | 2 |
| 5 | Germany | 1 | 1 | 4 | 6 |
| 6 | Italy | 1 | 1 | 2 | 4 |
| 6 | Great Britain | 1 | 1 | 2 | 4 |
| 8 | Georgia | 1 | 1 | 1 | 3 |
| 8 | Slovenia | 1 | 1 | 1 | 3 |
| 10 | Switzerland | 1 | 1 | 0 | 2 |
| 11 | Israel | 1 | 0 | 0 | 1 |
| 12 | Netherlands | 0 | 2 | 1 | 3 |
| 13 | Belgium | 0 | 1 | 3 | 4 |
| 14 | Portugal | 0 | 1 | 0 | 1 |
| 15 | Austria | 0 | 0 | 4 | 4 |
| 15 | Belarus | 0 | 0 | 4 | 4 |
| 17 | Bulgaria | 0 | 0 | 2 | 2 |
| 17 | Poland | 0 | 0 | 2 | 2 |
| 17 | Turkey | 0 | 0 | 2 | 2 |
| 20 | Armenia | 0 | 0 | 1 | 1 |
| 20 | Estonia | 0 | 0 | 1 | 1 |
| 20 | Hungary | 0 | 0 | 1 | 1 |

== Results overview ==
=== Men ===
==== 60 kg ====
| Position | Judoka | Country |
|---|---|---|
| 1. | Nestor Khergiani | Georgia |
| 2. | Craig Fallon | Great Britain |
| 3. | Armen Nazaryan | Armenia |
| 3. | Ludwig Paischer | Austria |
| 5. | Vitalii Mihailov | Moldova |
| 5. | Evgeni Stanev | Russia |
| 7. | Ruben Houkes | Netherlands |
| 7. | Cédric Taymans | Belgium |

==== 66 kg ====
| Position | Judoka | Country |
|---|---|---|
| 1. | Benjamin Darbelet | France |
| 2. | David Margoshvili | Georgia |
| 3. | Hüseyin Özkan | Turkey |
| 3. | Georgi Georgiev | Bulgaria |
| 5. | Magomed Dzhafarov | Russia |
| 5. | Ehud Vaks | Israel |
| 7. | Aliaksandr Shlyk | Belarus |
| 7. | Miklós Ungvári | Hungary |

==== 73 kg ====
| Position | Judoka | Country |
|---|---|---|
| 1. | Gennadiy Bilodid | Ukraine |
| 2. | Kioshi Uematsu | Spain |
| 3. | Anatoly Laryukov | Belarus |
| 3. | Krzysztof Wiłkomirski | Poland |
| 5. | Christophe Massina | France |
| 5. | João Neto | Portugal |
| 7. | Christodoulos Christodoulides | Cyprus |
| 7. | Zaur Pashayev | Azerbaijan |

==== 81 kg ====
| Position | Judoka | Country |
|---|---|---|
| 1. | Sergei Aschwanden | Switzerland |
| 2. | Nuno Delgado | Portugal |
| 3. | Aleksei Budõlin | Estonia |
| 3. | Florian Wanner | Germany |
| 5. | Cédric Claverie | France |
| 5. | Siarhei Shundzikau | Belarus |
| 7. | Constantin Cojoc | Romania |
| 7. | Iraklı Uznadze | Turkey |

==== 90 kg ====
| Position | Judoka | Country |
|---|---|---|
| 1. | Valentyn Grekov | Ukraine |
| 2. | Khasanbi Taov | Russia |
| 3. | Mark Huizinga | Netherlands |
| 3. | Özgür Yılmaz | Turkey |
| 5. | Dmitri Budõlin | Estonia |
| 5. | Siarhei Kukharenka | Belarus |
| 7. | Frédéric Demontfaucon | France |
| 7. | Zurab Zviadauri | Georgia |

==== 100 kg ====
| Position | Judoka | Country |
|---|---|---|
| 1. | Ariel Ze'evi | Israel |
| 2. | Elco van der Geest | Netherlands |
| 3. | Antal Kovács | Hungary |
| 3. | Ihar Makarau | Belarus |
| 5. | Daniel Gürschner | Germany |
| 5. | Iveri Jikurauli | Georgia |
| 7. | Franz Birkfellner | Austria |
| 7. | Dmitry Maksimov | Russia |

==== +100 kg ====
| Position | Judoka | Country |
|---|---|---|
| 1. | Tamerlan Tmenov | Russia |
| 2. | Aythami Ruano | Spain |
| 3. | Paolo Bianchessi | Italy |
| 3. | Juri Rybak | Belarus |
| 5. | Martin Padar | Estonia |
| 5. | Gabriel Munteanu | Romania |
| 7. | Zoltán Csizmadia | Hungary |
| 7. | Janusz Wojnarowicz | Poland |

==== Open class ====
| Position | Judoka | Country |
|---|---|---|
| 1. | Aleksandr Mikhailine | Russia |
| 2. | Dennis van der Geest | Netherlands |
| 3. | Andreas Tölzer | Germany |
| 3. | Ramaz Chochosvili | Georgia |
| 5. | Charalampos Papaioannou | Greece |
| 5. | Ivan Iliev | Bulgaria |
| 7. | Janusz Wojnarowicz | Poland |
| 7. | Denis Braidotti | Italy |

=== Women ===
==== 48 kg ====
| Position | Judoka | Country |
|---|---|---|
| 1. | Lioubov Brouletova | Russia |
| 2. | Giuseppina Macri | Italy |
| 3. | Tatiana Moskvina | Belarus |
| 3. | Ann Simons | Belgium |
| 5. | Lyudmyla Lusnikova | Ukraine |
| 5. | Julia Matijass | Germany |
| 7. | Alina Alexandra Dumitru | Romania |
| 7. | Nynke Klopstra | Netherlands |

==== 52 kg ====
| Position | Judoka | Country |
|---|---|---|
| 1. | Annabelle Euranie | France |
| 2. | Petra Nareks | Slovenia |
| 3. | Barbara Bukowska | Poland |
| 3. | Georgina Singleton | Great Britain |
| 5. | Ioana Maria Aluaș | Romania |
| 5. | Kristel Taelman | Belgium |
| 7. | Kristine Najaryan | Armenia |
| 7. | Natascha van Gurp | Netherlands |

==== 57 kg ====
| Position | Judoka | Country |
|---|---|---|
| 1. | Isabel Fernández | Spain |
| 2. | Lena Göldi | Switzerland |
| 3. | Sophie Cox | Great Britain |
| 3. | Sabrina Filzmoser | Austria |
| 5. | Barbara Harel | France |
| 5. | Olga Sonina | Russia |
| 7. | Cinzia Cavazzuti | Italy |
| 7. | Deborah Gravenstijn | Netherlands |

==== 63 kg ====
| Position | Judoka | Country |
|---|---|---|
| 1. | Sara Álvarez | Spain |
| 2. | Gella Vandecaveye | Belgium |
| 3. | Claudia Heill | Austria |
| 3. | Ylenia Scapin | Italy |
| 5. | Lucie Décosse | France |
| 5. | Karen Roberts | Great Britain |
| 7. | Andreia Cavalleri | Portugal |
| 7. | Danuše Zdeňková | Czech Republic |

==== 70 kg ====
| Position | Judoka | Country |
|---|---|---|
| 1. | Raša Sraka | Slovenia |
| 2. | Heide Wollert | Germany |
| 3. | Catherine Jacques | Belgium |
| 3. | Silvia Schlagnitweit | Austria |
| 5. | Sviatlana Tsimashenka | Belarus |
| 5. | ? | ? |
| 7. | Adriana Dadci | Poland |
| 7. | Noa Laor | Israel |

==== 78 kg ====
| Position | Judoka | Country |
|---|---|---|
| 1. | Lucia Morico | Italy |
| 2. | Raquel Prieto | Spain |
| 3. | Jenny Karl | Germany |
| 3. | Céline Lebrun | France |
| 5. | Barbara Wójcicka | Poland |
| 5. | Claudia Zwiers | Netherlands |
| 7. | Anastasiya Matrosova | Ukraine |
| 7. | Heidi Rakels | Belgium |

==== +78 kg ====
| Position | Judoka | Country |
|---|---|---|
| 1. | Karina Bryant | Great Britain |
| 2. | Tea Donguzashvili | Russia |
| 3. | Marie Elisabeth Veys | Belgium |
| 3. | Sandra Köppen | Germany |
| 5. | Anne-Sophie Mondière | France |
| 5. | Susana Somolinos | Spain |
| 7. | Françoise Harteveld | Netherlands |
| 7. | Maryna Prokofyeva | Ukraine |

==== Open class ====
| Position | Judoka | Country |
|---|---|---|
| 1. | Katrin Beinroth | Germany |
| 2. | Irina Rodina | Russia |
| 3. | Lucija Polavder | Slovenia |
| 3. | Tsvetana Bozhilova | Bulgaria |
| 5. | Eva Bisseni | France |
| 5. | Simone Callender | Great Britain |
| 7. | Jessica van der Spil | Netherlands |
| 7. | Brigitte Olivier | Belgium |
