= Judo at the 1996 Summer Olympics – Women's 56 kg =

Women's 56 kg at the Games of the XXVI Olympiad
- Venue: Georgia World Congress Center
- Date: 24 July 1996
- Competitors: 22 from 22 nations

Medalists
1st place, gold medalist(s)		Driulys González	Cuba
2nd place, silver medalist(s)		Jung Sun-yong	South Korea
3rd place, bronze medalist(s)		Isabel Fernández	Spain
3rd place, bronze medalist(s)		Marisabel Lomba	Belgium

These are the results of the women's 56 kg (also known as lightweight) competition in judo at the 1996 Summer Olympics in Atlanta, Georgia. A total of 22 women competed in this event, limited to jūdōka whose body weight was less than, or equal to, 56 kilograms. Competition took place on 1996-07-24 in the Georgia World Congress Center.

== Results ==
The gold and silver medalists were determined by the final match of the main single-elimination bracket.

Round of 32
Noriko Mizoguchi (JPN)	W
Ursula Myren (SWE)	L
Jeny Rodriguez (HON)	L
Maria Pekli (HUN)	W
Narelle Hill (AUS)	L
Isabel Fernández (ESP)	W
Driulys González (CUB)	W
Magali Baton (FRA)	L
Nicola Fairbrother (GBR)	W
Raoudha Chaari (TUN)	L
Zulfiya Garipova (RUS)	L
Liu Chuang (CHN)	W

Round of 16
Noriko Mizoguchi (JPN)	W
Marie-Josée Morneau (CAN)	L
Sun-Yong Jung (KOR)	W
Marisabel Lomba (BEL)	L
Maria Pekli (HUN)	W
Danielle Zangrando (BRA)	L
Zulfiya Guseynova (AZE)	L
Isabel Fernández (ESP)	W
Jessica Gal (NED)	L
Driulys González (CUB)	W
Nicola Fairbrother (GBR)	W
Beata Kucharzewska (POL)	L
Liu Chuang (CHN)	W
Corinna West (USA)	L
Huang Ai-chun (TPE)	W
Filipa Cavalleri (POR)	L

Quarterfinals
Noriko Mizoguchi (JPN)	L
Sun-Yong Jung (KOR)	W
Maria Pekli (HUN)	L
Isabel Fernández (ESP)	W
Driulys González (CUB)	W
Nicola Fairbrother (GBR)	L
Liu Chuang (CHN)	W
Ai-Chun Huang (TPE)	L

Semifinals
Sun-Yong Jung (KOR)	W
Isabel Fernández (ESP)	L
Driulys González (CUB)	W
Liu Chuang (CHN)	L

Gold medal final
Sun-Yong Jung (KOR)	L
Driulys González (CUB)	W

=== Repechage ===
The losing semifinalists as well as those judoka eliminated in earlier rounds by the four semifinalists of the main bracket advanced to the repechage. These matches determined the two bronze medalists for the event.

First round
Bye
Lomba (BEL)	W
Hill (AUS)	L
Guseynova (AZE)	W
Baton (FRA)	W
Gal (NED)	L
Garipova (RUS)	W
West (USA)	L

Second round
Lomba (BEL)	W
Mizoguchi (JPN)	L
Guseynova (AZE)	W
Pekli (HUN)	L
Baton (FRA)	L
Fairbrother (GBR)	W
Garipova (RUS)	W
Huang (TPE)	L

Third round
Lomba (BEL)	W
Guseynova (AZE)	L
Fairbrother (GBR)	W
Garipova (RUS)	L

Bronze medal finals
Lomba (BEL)	W
Liu (CHN)	L
Fairbrother (GBR)	L
Fernández (ESP)	W
