= Masuchi =

Masuchi (written 増地), is a Japanese surname. Notable people with the surname include:

- Chiyori Masuchi (増地 千代里; born 1970), Japanese judoka
- Katsuyuki Masuchi (増地 克之; born 1970), Japanese judoka
- Ryotaro Masuchi (増地遼汰朗; born 2002), Japanese judoka

== See also ==
- Mabuchi Motor
