= Judo at the 2008 Summer Olympics – Women's 57 kg =

Women's 57 kg at the Games of the XXIX Olympiad
- Venue: Beijing Science and Technology; University Gymnasium
- Date: August 11, 2008
- Competitors: 22 from 22 nations
- Winning score: 0011

Medalists
1st place, gold medalist(s)		Giulia Quintavalle	Italy
2nd place, silver medalist(s)		Deborah Gravenstijn	Netherlands
3rd place, bronze medalist(s)		Xu Yan	China
3rd place, bronze medalist(s)		Ketleyn Quadros	Brazil

The women's 57 kg (also known as lightweight) tournament in the judo at the 2008 Summer Olympics was held on August 11 at the Beijing Science and Technology University Gymnasium. A total of 22 women competed in this event, limited to jūdōka with a body weight of less than 57 kilograms. Preliminary rounds started at 12:00 Noon CST. Repechage finals, semifinals, bouts for bronze medals and the final were held at 18:00 p.m. CST.

This event was the third-lightest of the women's judo weight classes, limiting competitors to a maximum of 57 kilograms of body mass. Like all other judo events, bouts lasted five minutes. If the bout was still tied at the end, it was extended for another five-minute, sudden-death period; if neither judoka scored during that period, the match is decided by the judges. The tournament bracket consisted of a single-elimination contest culminating in a gold medal match. There was also a repechage to determine the winners of the two bronze medals. Each judoka who had lost to a semifinalist competed in the repechage. The two judokas who lost in the semifinals faced the winner of the opposite half of the bracket's repechage in bronze medal bouts.

== Qualifying athletes ==
Mat	Athlete	Country
1	Valerie Gotay	United States
1	Gulzat Uralbayeva	Kazakhstan
1	Isabel Fernández	Spain
1	Kang Sin-Young	South Korea
1	Ketleyn Quadros	Brazil
1	Deborah Gravenstijn	Netherlands
1	Kifayat Gasimova	Azerbaijan
1	Aiko Sato	Japan
1	Nina Koivumaki	Finland
1	Xu Yan	China
1	Lila Latrous	Algeria
2	Giulia Quintavalle	Italy
2	Yvonne Bönisch	Germany
2	Khishigbatyn Erdenet-Od	Mongolia
2	Barbara Harel	France
2	Kye Sun Hui	North Korea
2	Sabrina Filzmoser	Austria
2	Nesria Jelassi	Tunisia
2	Ange Jean Baptiste	Haiti
2	Yurisleidy Lupetey	Cuba
2	Maria Pekli	Australia
2	Bernadett Baczko	Hungary

== Tournament results ==
=== Final ===
Final
1	Deborah Gravenstijn (NED)	0001
2	Giulia Quintavalle (ITA)	0011

=== Mat 1 ===
The gold and silver medalists were determined by the final match of the main single-elimination bracket.

1st round
Valerie Gotay (USA)	1001
Gulzat Uralbayeva (KAZ)	0010
Kang Sin-Young (KOR)	0002
Ketleyn Quadros (BRA)	0011
Xu Yan (CHN)	1001
Lila Latrous (ALG)	0001

Round of 16
Valerie Gotay (USA)	0000
Isabel Fernández (ESP)	0010
Ketleyn Quadros (BRA)	0000
Deborah Gravenstijn (NED)	0001
Kifayat Gasimova (AZE)	0100
Aiko Sato (JPN)	1001
Nina Koivumaki (FIN)	0000
Xu Yan (CHN)	0020

Quarter Finals
Isabel Fernández (ESP)	0000
Deborah Gravenstijn (NED)	0001
Aiko Sato (JPN)	0002
Xu Yan (CHN)	0010

Semi Finals
Deborah Gravenstijn (NED)	0100
Xu Yan (CHN)	0010

=== Mat 2 ===
The gold and silver medalists were determined by the final match of the main single-elimination bracket.

1st round
Giulia Quintavalle (ITA)	0101
Yvonne Bönisch (GER)	0001
Kye Sun Hui (PRK)	1001
Sabrina Filzmoser (AUT)	0001
Ange Jean Baptiste (HAI)	0000
Yurisleidy Lupetey (CUB)	0111

Round of 16
Giulia Quintavalle (ITA)	1010
Khishigbatyn Erdenet-Od (MGL)	0001
Barbara Harel (FRA)	0101
Kye Sun Hui (PRK)	0010
Nesria Jelassi (TUN)	1000
Yurisleidy Lupetey (CUB)	0000
Maria Pekli (AUS)	0101
Bernadett Baczko (HUN)	0100

Quarter Finals
Giulia Quintavalle (ITA)	0010
Barbara Harel (FRA)	0001
Nesria Jelassi (TUN)	0000
Maria Pekli (AUS)	1011

Semi Finals
Giulia Quintavalle (ITA)	0010
Maria Pekli (AUS)	0002

=== Repechage ===
Those judoka eliminated in earlier rounds by the four semifinalists of the main bracket advanced to the repechage. These matches determined the two bronze medalists for the event.

First round
Ketleyn Quadros (BRA)
BYE
Nina Koivumaki (FIN)	0001
Lila Latrous (ALG)	0000
Yvonne Bönisch (GER)	0110
Khishigbatyn Erdenet-Od (MGL)	0001
Bernadett Baczko (HUN)
BYE

Second round
Ketleyn Quadros (BRA)	0001
Isabel Fernández (ESP)	0000
Aiko Sato (JPN)	1011
Nina Koivumaki (FIN)	0000
Barbara Harel (FRA)	0001
Yvonne Bönisch (GER)	0000
Nesria Jelassi (TUN)	0000
Bernadett Baczko (HUN)	1011

Third round
Ketleyn Quadros (BRA)	1000
Aiko Sato (JPN)	0000
Barbara Harel (FRA)	0110
Bernadett Baczko (HUN)	0010

Bronze medal finals
Maria Pekli (AUS)	0000
Ketleyn Quadros (BRA)	1000
Xu Yan (CHN)	1000
Barbara Harel (FRA)	0101
