= Natalia Yukhareva =

Russian judoka

Personal information
- Full name: Nataliya Aleksandrovna Yukhareva
- Born: 17 September 1975 (age 50) Saint Petersburg, Russian SFSR, Soviet Union
- Occupation: Judoka
- Height: 1.66 m (5 ft 5 in)

Sport
- Country: Russia
- Sport: Judo
- Weight class: –57 kg
- Club: SKA St. Petersburg
- Coached by: Sergey Yukharev

Achievements and titles
- Olympic Games: 7th (2004)
- World Champ.: 9th (2007)
- European Champ.: (bronze) (2004)
Medal record
Women's judo
Representing Russia
European Championships
Bronze medal – third place	2004 Bucharest	–57 kg

Profile at external databases
- IJF: 52956
- JudoInside.com: 31037
- Updated on 19 November 2022

Nataliya Aleksandrovna Yukhareva (Russian: Наталья Александровна Юхарева; born 17 September 1975 in Saint Petersburg) is a Russian judoka who competed in the women's lightweight category. She held a 2007 Russian senior title for her own division, picked up a total of seventeen medals in her career, including a bronze from the European Championships, and finished seventh in the 57-kg class at the 2004 Summer Olympics. Throughout most of her sporting career, Yukhareva trained as a full-fledged member of the judo squad for SKA St. Petersburg, under her personal coach, father, and sensei Sergey Yukharev.

== Career ==
Yukhareva qualified for the Russian squad in the women's lightweight class (57 kg) at the 2004 Summer Olympics in Athens, by placing third from the European Championships in Bucharest, Romania. She got off to a rough start with a sudden-death defeat from North Korean judoka and 1996 Olympic champion Kye Sun-hui in the prelims. With her opponent moving further into the final, Yukhareva permitted herself a chance for an Olympic bronze medal by immediately clutching Malta's Marcon Bezzina and Great Britain's Sophie Cox in the repechage round, but fell short to France's Barbara Harel by a double yuko and a seoi nage (shoulder throw) in their subsequent match, relegating Yukhareva into the seventh position.
