= Danielle Zangrando =

Brazilian Olympic judoka (born 1979)

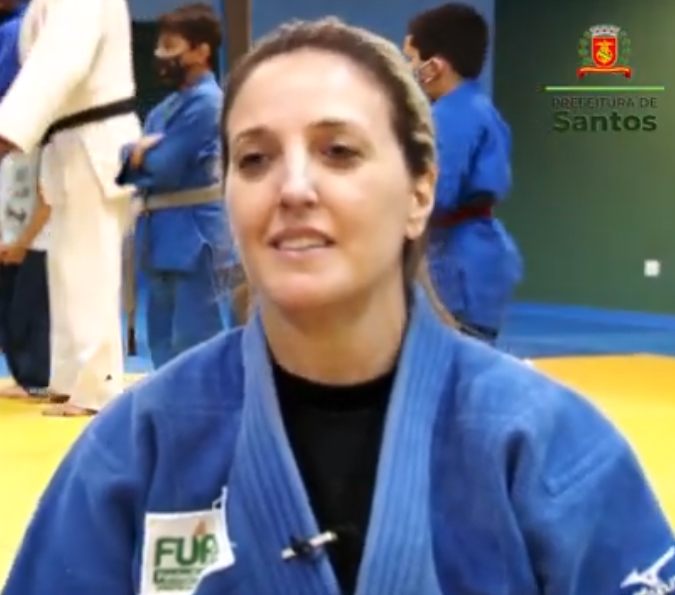
- In a 2021 video

Personal information
- Born: 25 July 1979 (age 47) São Paulo, Brazil
- Occupation: Judoka
- Height: 1.62 m (5 ft 4 in)

Sport
- Country: Brazil
- Sport: Judo
- Weight class: –57 kg
- Club: Santos FC Judô
- Coached by: Paulo Duarte

Achievements and titles
- Olympic Games: 9th (2004)
- World Champ.: (bronze) (1995)
- Pan American Champ.: (gold) (2004)
Medal record
Women's judo
Representing Brazil
World Championships
| Bronze medal – third place | 1995 Chiba | –56 kg |
Pan American Games
| Gold medal – first place | 2007 Rio de Janeiro | –57 kg |
| Bronze medal – third place | 1995 Mara del Plata | –56 kg |
| Bronze medal – third place | 1999 Winnipeg | –57 kg |
Pan American Championships
| Gold medal – first place | 2004 Isla Margarita | –57 kg |
| Silver medal – second place | 1996 San Juan | –56 kg |
| Silver medal – second place | 2006 Buenos Aires | –57 kg |
| Silver medal – second place | 2007 Montreal | –57 kg |
| Silver medal – second place | 2009 Buenos Aires | –57 kg |
| Bronze medal – third place | 1997 Guadalajara | –56 kg |
World Juniors Championships
| Silver medal – second place | 1996 Porto | –56 kg |
| Silver medal – second place | 1998 Cali | –57 kg |
Pan American Junior Championships
| Silver medal – second place | 1998 Maracaibo | –57 kg |

Profile at external databases
- IJF: 13963
- JudoInside.com: 729
- Updated on 10 January 2023

Danielle Zangrando (born 25 July 1979 in São Paulo) is a retired Brazilian judoka who competed in the women's lightweight category. She picked up a total of thirty medals in her career, including three from the Pan American Games (1995, 1999, and 2007), and a bronze from the 1995 World Judo Championships in Chiba, Japan, and also appeared in the 57-kg class in two editions of the Olympic Games (1996 and 2004). Growing up in Santos, Zangrando took up judo at the age of 5 following her brother to the dojo of sensei Paulo Duarte. Throughout most of her sporting career, Zangrando trained under Duarte as a full-fledged member of the judo squad for Santos FC Judô.

As a 16-year-old neophyte to the sport, Zangrando reached the pinnacle of her judo career at the 1995 World Judo Championships in Chiba, Japan, where she became the first ever Brazilian female to pick up a bronze medal in the lightweight category. Zangrando's remarkable result marked her official debut on the Brazilian team to compete in the same division at the 1996 Summer Olympics in Atlanta. Being inexperienced to the senior stint, Zangrando succumbed her opening match to an ippon and a tsurikomi goshi (lifting and pulling hip throw) assault from Hungary's Maria Pekli. She managed to collect another bronze in the 57-kg division at the 1999 Pan American Games in Winnipeg, Manitoba, Canada, but missed a chance to campaign for her 2000 Olympic bid due to spinal disc herniation, nearly reaching her early retirement from judo.

Coming out of temporary halt, Zangrando paved her stretch to qualify for her second Brazilian judo squad, as a 25-year-old, in the women's lightweight class (57 kg) at the 2004 Summer Olympics in Athens. She placed first in her own division from the Pan American Judo Championships in Margarita Island, Venezuela to guarantee her spot on the Brazilian team for the first time in eight years. Zangrando got off to a firm start with an effortless victory over China's Liu Yuxiang, before falling short in the quarterfinals by an ippon and an uchi mata (inner thigh throw) from Dutch judoka Deborah Gravenstijn. In the repechage round, Zangrando lost to Italy's Cinzia Cavazzuti on a thirteen-second waza-ari tiebreaker after she received a yuko and conceded with only three shido penalties over her opponent by four, resulting to her elimination from the tournament.

When her country Brazil hosted the 2007 Pan American Games in Rio de Janeiro, Zangrando overpowered U.S. judoka Valerie Gotay to claim her first and only career gold in the 57-kg division by the enchantment of her home crowd. Although she decided not to pursue her third Olympic bid, Zangrando added a silver to her career hardware in the same category at the 2009 Pan American Judo Championships in Buenos Aires, Argentina, losing the final to Cuba's Yurisleydis Lupetey. The following year, Zangrando officially announced her retirement from the sport.

Zangrando was already in law school when ESPN Brasil invited her to comment on the judo tournament for the 2000 Summer Olympics. The experience made Zangrando interested in studying journalism following her law degree. Following her graduation, Zangrando has been a sports reporter for Terra Networks, Rede Globo and ESPN.
