= Jessica García =

Jessica García may also refer to:

- Jessica García (judoka) (born 1980), Puerto Rican judoka
- Jessica Marie Garcia (born 1987), American actress
- Jessica García (taekwondo) (born 1995), Mexican para-taekwondo athlete
