= Lena Göldi =

Swiss Olympic judoka

Personal information
- Born: 1 October 1979 (age 46) Safnern, Bern, Switzerland
- Occupation: Judoka
- Height: 1.64 m (5 ft 5 in)
- Website: www.lena-judo.ch

Sport
- Country: Switzerland
- Sport: Judo
- Weight class: –57 kg
- Club: JC Biel
- Coached by: Leo Held

Achievements and titles
- Olympic Games: 9th (2004)
- World Champ.: 9th (1997, 1999, 2007)
- European Champ.: (silver) (2003)
Medal record
Women's judo
Representing Switzerland
European Championships
Silver medal – second place	2003 Düsseldorf	–57 kg
World Juniors Championships
Bronze medal – third place	1998 Cali	–57 kg
European Junior Championships
Gold medal – first place	1998 Bucharest	–57 kg
Silver medal – second place	1997 Ljubljana	–56 kg

Profile at external databases
- IJF: 24662
- JudoInside.com: 6147
- Updated on 10 January 2023

Lena Göldi (born 1 October 1979 in Safnern, Bern) is a Swiss retired judoka who competed in the women's lightweight category. She held six Swiss senior titles in her own division, picked up a total of thirty medals in her career, including a silver from the 2003 European Judo Championships in Düsseldorf, and represented Switzerland as a lone female judoka at the 2004 Summer Olympics. Throughout most of her sporting career, Goeldi trained for the Biel Judo Club in Biel, and also became a full-fledged member of the Swiss national judo squad, under head coach and sensei Leo Held.

Goeldi qualified for the two-member Swiss judo squad in the women's lightweight class (57 kg) at the 2004 Summer Olympics in Athens, based on the nation's entry to the top 22 for her own division in the world rankings by the International Judo Federation. Despite having a torn anterior cruciate ligament on her right knee, Goeldi managed to secure two straight victories over 2000 Olympic bronze medalist Maria Pekli of Australia and Catherine Ekuta of Nigeria in the prelims. Facing off against Cuba's Yurisleydis Lupetey in the quarterfinals, Goeldi could not throw her opponent into the tatami because of a knee injury, and had to pull herself out of the tournament through a kiken gachi decision. After the match, she was immediately carried by head coach Leo Held and physiotherapist Pascal Bourban to the wheelchair from the tatami, and was sent directly to the medical clinic within the Olympic Village. Because the ligament had been completely torn in her right knee, medics required her to undergo a six-month rehabilitation and a surgery. Because Lupetey advanced further into the semifinals, Goeldi was also unable to fight against France's Barbara Harel in their scheduled repechage match, granting her opponent a quick victory by a default (a fusen gachi decision).

Goldi also sought her second Olympic bid in Beijing, but she had been lingered by foot and shoulder injuries during her pre-Olympic campaign, and thereby decided to retire from judo.
