= Judo at the 2006 Asian Games – Women's 57 kg =

Judo competition

Women's 57 kg at the 2006 Asian Games
- Venue: Qatar SC Indoor Hall
- Date: 4 December 2006
- Competitors: 14 from 14 nations

Medalists
gold medal	Xu Yan	China
silver medal	Aiko Sato	Japan
bronze medal	Kang Sin-young	South Korea
bronze medal	Hong Ok-song	North Korea

The women's 57 kilograms (lightweight) competition at the 2006 Asian Games in Doha was held on 4 December at the Qatar SC Indoor Hall.

== Schedule ==
All times are Arabia Standard Time (UTC+03:00)

Date	Time	Event
Monday, 4 December 2006	14:00	Round of 16
Monday, 4 December 2006	14:00	Quarterfinals
Monday, 4 December 2006	14:00	Repechage −1R
Monday, 4 December 2006	14:00	Repechage final
Monday, 4 December 2006	14:00	Semifinals
Monday, 4 December 2006	14:00	Finals

== Results ==
=== Main bracket ===
Round of 16
Xu Yan (CHN)	1000
Tou Si Man (MAC)	0000
Nguyễn Thị Kiệu (VIE)	0020
L. Nirupama Devi (IND)	0000
Esmira Alyşewa (TKM)	0000
Hong Ok-song (PRK)	1000
Kang Sin-young (KOR)	1001
Gulzat Uralbayeva (KAZ)	0000
Harshani Kumari Herath (SRI)	0000
Estie Liwanen (PHI)	1111
Aiko Sato (JPN)	1000
Chan Tsz Kwan (HKG)	0000

Quarterfinals
Xu Yan (CHN)	0012
Elena Isakova (KGZ)	0000
Nguyễn Thị Kiệu (VIE)	0000
Hong Ok-song (PRK)	1000
Kang Sin-young (KOR)	1000
Estie Liwanen (PHI)	0000
Aiko Sato (JPN)	1021
Khishigbatyn Erdenet-Od (MGL)	0000

Semifinals
Xu Yan (CHN)	1010
Hong Ok-song (PRK)	0001
Kang Sin-young (KOR)	0000
Aiko Sato (JPN)	0001

Gold medal contest
Xu Yan (CHN)	1000
Aiko Sato (JPN)	0000

=== Repechage ===
Repechage −1R
Tou Si Man (MAC)	0000
Elena Isakova (KGZ)	1000
Esmira Alyşewa (TKM)	0000
Nguyễn Thị Kiệu (VIE)	1002
Gulzat Uralbayeva (KAZ)	1012
Estie Liwanen (PHI)	0011
Chan Tsz Kwan (HKG)	0000
Khishigbatyn Erdenet-Od (MGL)	1000

Repechage final
Elena Isakova (KGZ)	1000
Nguyễn Thị Kiệu (VIE)	0000
Gulzat Uralbayeva (KAZ)	0000
Khishigbatyn Erdenet-Od (MGL)	0201

Bronze medal contest
Elena Isakova (KGZ)	0000
Kang Sin-young (KOR)	1000
Khishigbatyn Erdenet-Od (MGL)	0000
Hong Ok-song (PRK)	0001
