= Elina Nasaudrodro =

Fijian judoka (born 1985)

Personal information
- Full name: Elina Vavailagi Nasaudrodro
- Nationality: Fiji
- Born: 22 December 1985 (age 40) Suva, Fiji
- Occupation: Judoka
- Height: 1.57 m (5 ft 2 in)
- Weight: 57 kg (126 lb)

Sport
- Sport: Judo
- Event: 57 kg

Profile at external databases
- JudoInside.com: 33130

Elina Vavailagi Nasaudrodro (born 22 December 1985) is a Fijian judoka who competed in the women's lightweight category. She won a bronze medal in the 57-kg division at the 2004 Oceania Judo Championships in Nouméa, New Caledonia, and represented her nation Fiji at the 2004 Summer Olympics in Athens at the age of eighteen.

== Early life and education ==
Originally from Dakuni village on Beqa island, Nasaudrodro attended Lomary School, and later moved to Pacific Harbour. She trained with Sensei Yukiko Honda, as well as the national women's head coach, Takahiko Hasegawa of the Fiji Judo Association. According to Hasegawa, Nasaudrodro was "randomly picked" out of a group of candidates to train as a judoka.

== Career ==
She qualified for the two-member Fijian judo squad at the 2004 Summer Olympics in Athens, after placing third in the women's lightweight class (57 kg) at the 2004 Oceania Judo Championships in New Caledonia, and accumulating the highest number of points. At the Olympics, Nasaudrodro immediately lost her opening match to highly credentialed British judoka Sophie Cox, who pinned and duly wrapped her on the tatami in a broken scarf hold (kuzure kesa gatame) within a minute. According to Radio Australia, Nasaudrodro was suffering from a knee injury.

In 2005, Nasaudrodro led the Oceania girls judo team, including three Fijians and one New Caledonian, to the Australian Youth Olympic Festival in Sydney. Competing in the 63 kg weight class, she won a bronze medal after beating Chinese Taipei in the first round, and losing to Australia in the second.
