= Jessica García (judoka) =

Puerto Rican judoka (born 1980)

Personal information
- Full name: Jessica García
- Nationality: Puerto Rico
- Born: 12 July 1980 (age 46) San Juan, Puerto Rico
- Occupation: Judoka
- Height: 1.67 m (5 ft 5 1/2 in)
- Weight: 57 kg (126 lb)

Sport
- Sport: Judo
- Event: 57 kg
Medal record
Women's judo
Representing Puerto Rico
Central American and Caribbean Games
Gold medal – first place	2010 Mayagüez	63 kg

Jessica García (born July 12, 1980, in San Juan) is a Puerto Rican judoka who competed in the women's lightweight category. She picked up a total of twenty-one medals in her career, including a prestigious gold from the 2010 Central American and Caribbean Games in Mayagüez, and represented her nation Puerto Rico at the 2004 Summer Olympics.

== Life and career ==
Garcia qualified as a lone female judoka for the Puerto Rican squad in the women's lightweight class (57 kg) at the 2004 Summer Olympics in Athens, by granting a tripartite invitation from the International Judo Federation. Garcia received a bye in the first round, before she succumbed to an ippon victory and an inner-thigh throw (uchi mata) from German judoka and eventual Olympic champion Yvonne Bönisch just seventeen seconds into her opening match. In the repechage, Garcia gave herself a chance for an Olympic bronze medal, but she was duly wrapped in a scarf hold (kesa gatame) and pinned down the tatami by defending Olympic champion Isabel Fernández of Spain for two minutes and thirty-two seconds during their first playoff of the draft.

When her nation Puerto Rico hosted the 2010 Central American and Caribbean Games in Mayagüez, Garcia reached the pinnacle of her sporting career, as she toppled Venezuela's Ysis Barreto down the tatami on an ippon to claim the women's lightweight judo title.
