= Marsman =

Marsman is a Dutch surname. It is either an occupational surname, with the meaning "peddler, hawker" (similar to the surname Kramer), or a toponymic surname, with more or less the meaning "marsh man". People with the surname include:

- Gooitske Marsman (born 1965), Dutch judoka
- Hendrik Marsman (1899–1940), Dutch poet and writer
- Hendrik Jan Marsman (1937–2012), Dutch writer, poet, novelist and translator known by his pen name J. Bernlef
- Lieke Marsman (1990–2026), Dutch poet
- Margot Marsman (1932–2018), Dutch swimmer
- Nick Marsman (born 1990), Dutch football goalkeeper
