= Catherine Ekuta =

Nigerian judoka (born 1979)

Personal information
- Full name: Catherine Ewa Ekuta
- Nationality: Nigeria
- Born: 25 November 1979 (age 46) Lagos, Nigeria
- Occupation: Judoka
- Height: 1.43 m (4 ft 8 in)
- Weight: 57 kg (126 lb)

Sport
- Sport: Judo
- Event: 57 kg
Medal record
Women's judo
Representing Nigeria
All-Africa Games
Bronze medal – third place	1999 Johannesburg	52 kg
Gold medal – first place	2003 Nigeria	57 kg
Bronze medal – third place	2007 Algiers	63 kg

Profile at external databases
- JudoInside.com: 33039

Catherine Ewa Ekuta (born 25 November 1979) is a Nigerian judoka who competed in the women's lightweight category. She picked up a gold and two bronze medals each in the 57-kg division at the All-Africa Games (1999 (bronze), 2003 (gold) and 2007 (bronze)). The gold medal was in 2003 All-Africa Games (Coja) Nigeria, in 57 kg she qualified and represented her nation Nigeria at the 2004 Summer Olympics.

Ekuta qualified for the two-member Nigerian judo squad in the women's lightweight class (57 kg) at the 2004 Summer Olympics in Athens, by winning a gold medal in 2003 All-Africa Games (Coja) Nigeria, in 57 kg), she also placed third and receiving a berth from the African Championships in Tunis, Tunisia. Ekuta received a bye in the opening round, before crashing down the tatami to an ippon and a sleeve lifting and pulling hip throw (sode tsurikomi goshi) from Switzerland's Lena Göldi with just 44 seconds remaining in her first match.
