= Ioulietta Boukouvala =

Greek judoka

Personal information
- Born: 28 August 1983 (age 42) Ioannina, Greece
- Occupation: Judoka

Sport
- Country: Greece
- Sport: Judo
- Weight class: ‍–‍57 kg, ‍–‍63 kg

Achievements and titles
- Olympic Games: R16 (2004)
- World Champ.: (bronze) (2010)
- European Champ.: (silver) (2012)
Medal record
Women's judo
Representing Greece
World Championships
| Bronze medal – third place | 2010 Tokyo | ‍–‍57 kg |
European Championships
| Silver medal – second place | 2012 Chelyabinsk | ‍–‍57 kg |
IJF Grand Slam
| Gold medal – first place | 2009 Paris | ‍–‍57 kg |
| Bronze medal – third place | 2009 Moscow | ‍–‍57 kg |
IJF Grand Prix
| Gold medal – first place | 2011 Amsterdam | ‍–‍57 kg |
| Silver medal – second place | 2011 Qingdao | ‍–‍57 kg |
| Bronze medal – third place | 2010 Abu Dhabi | ‍–‍57 kg |
European U23 Championships
| Gold medal – first place | 2003 Yerevan | ‍–‍57 kg |
| Gold medal – first place | 2005 Kyiv | ‍–‍63 kg |
Mediterranean Games
| Gold medal – first place | 2009 Pescara | ‍–‍57 kg |
| Silver medal – second place | 2005 Almeria | ‍–‍57 kg |

Profile at external databases
- IJF: 840
- JudoInside.com: 27326
- Updated on 25 July 2023

Ioulietta Boukouvala (born 28 August 1983) is a Greek judoka. She competed at the 2004 and 2012 Summer Olympics. During the Women's 57 kg event at the 2012 Games, Boukouvala claimed she was bitten by her Cuban opponent, Yurileidys Lupetey Cobas, in their first round bout.
