= Pasi Lind =

Finnish judoka (born 1961)

Pasi Lind (born 16 June 1961) is a Finnish judoka.

== Achievements ==
Year	Tournament	Place	Weight class
1989	European Judo Championships	7th	Half heavyweight (95 kg)

== See also ==
- European Judo Championships
- History of martial arts
- List of judo techniques
- List of judoka
- Martial arts timeline
