= Kang Sin-young =

South Korean judoka (born 1977)

Personal information
- Nationality: South Korea
- Born: 20 March 1977 (age 49)
- Height: 1.70 m (5 ft 7 in)
- Weight: 57 kg (126 lb)

Sport
- Sport: Judo
- Event: 57 kg
Medal record
Women's judo
Representing South Korea
Asian Games
Bronze medal – third place	2006 Doha	57 kg
Asian Championships
Silver medal – second place	2008 Jeju City	57 kg

Korean name
- Hangul: 강신영
- RR: Gang Sinyeong
- MR: Kang Sinyŏng

Kang Sin-young (also Kang Sin-yeong, Korean: 강신영; born March 20, 1977) is a South Korean judoka, who played in the lightweight category. She won a silver medal for her division at the 2008 Asian Judo Championships in Jeju City, and bronze at the 2006 Asian Games in Doha, Qatar.

Kang represented South Korea at the 2008 Summer Olympics in Beijing, where she competed for the women's lightweight class (57 kg). She lost the first preliminary round match to Brazil's Ketleyn Quadros, who successfully scored a yuko and a te gatame (hand armlock), at the end of the five-minute period.
