= Özgür Yılmaz (judoka) =

Turkish judoka (born 1977)

Medal record

Men's judo

European Championships
Bronze medal – third place	2003 Düsseldorf	90 kg

Özgür Yılmaz (born 8 December 1977) is a Turkish judoka.

== Achievements ==
Year	Tournament	Place	Weight class
2003	European Judo Championships	3rd	Middleweight (90 kg)
