= Judo at the 2026 Asian Games – Men's 100 kg =

Judo competition

Judo Men's 100 kg at the 2026 Asian Games
- Venue: Aichi International Arena
- Location: Nagoya, Japan

Medalists
gold medal	Ryotaro Masuchi	Japan
silver medal	Dzhakhongir Madzhidov	Tajikistan
bronze medal	Han Ju-yeop	South Korea
bronze medal	Ernazar Sarsenbaev	Uzbekistan

The men's 100 kilograms (Half heavyweight) competition in Judo at the 2026 Asian Games in Nagoya was held on 2 October 2026 at the Aichi International Arena.

== Schedule ==
All times are Japan Standard Time (UTC+09:00)

Date	Time	Event
Friday, 2 October 2026	11:00	Elimination round of 16
Friday, 2 October 2026	11:00	Quarterfinals
Friday, 2 October 2026	11:00	Repechage
Friday, 2 October 2026	11:00	Semifinals
Friday, 2 October 2026	17:00	Finals

== Results ==
=== Main bracket ===
==== Final ====
Final
Ryotaro Masuchi (JPN)	100
Dzhakhongir Madzhidov (TJK)	000 (yellow card)

==== Top half ====
Round of 16
Ryotaro Masuchi (JPN)	101
Chino Sy Tancontian (PHI)	000
Ernazar Sarsenbaev (UZB)	110
Kittipong Hantratin (THA)	000

Quarter-finals
Said Sadrudinov (BRN)	DNS
Ryotaro Masuchi (JPN)	w/o
Marat Baikamurov (KAZ)	000
Ernazar Sarsenbaev (UZB)	011 (yellow card)

Semi-finals
Ryotaro Masuchi (JPN)	002 (yellow card)
Ernazar Sarsenbaev (UZB)	001

==== Bottom half ====
Round of 16
Caramnob Sagaipov (LBN)	000
Daut Poltushev (KGZ)	100
Han Ju-yeop (KOR)	101 (yellow card)
Tserenbatyn Gan-Erdene (MGL)	000 (yellow card)

Quarter-finals
Dzhakhongir Madzhidov (TJK)	100 (yellow card)
Daut Poltushev (KGZ)	000
Huang Fuchun (CHN)	000
Han Ju-yeop (KOR)	001

Semi-finals
Dzhakhongir Madzhidov (TJK)	001
Han Ju-yeop (KOR)	000

=== Repechage ===
Repechage
Said Sadrudinov (BRN)	DNS
Marat Baikamurov (KAZ)	w/o
Daut Poltushev (KGZ)	010 (yellow card)
Huang Fuchun (CHN)	100

Bronze medal
Marat Baikamurov (KAZ)	000
Han Ju-yeop (KOR)	001
Huang Fuchun (CHN)	001 (yellow card)
Ernazar Sarsenbaev (UZB)	100
