= Magali Baton =

French judoka

Personal information
- Nationality: French
- Born: 13 March 1971 (age 54); Saint-Chamond, France

Sport
- Sport: Judo

Magali Baton (born 13 March 1971) is a French judoka. She competed in the women's lightweight event at the 1996 Summer Olympics.
