= Pernilla Ribeiro Novais =

Swedish judoka

Personal information
- Full name: Anna Pernilla Ribeiro Novais
- Born: 3 December 1971 (age 54) Umeå, Sweden
- Occupation: Judoka

Sport
- Country: Sweden
- Sport: Judo
- Weight class: ‍–‍57 kg

Achievements and titles
- Olympic Games: 9th (2000)
- World Champ.: 5th (1999)
- European Champ.: (silver) (2000)
Medal record
Women's judo
Representing Sweden
European Championships
Silver medal – second place	2000 Wrocław	‍–‍57 kg
Summer Universiade
Bronze medal – third place	1994 Münster	‍–‍56 kg

Profile at external databases
- IJF: 53128
- JudoInside.com: 3755
- Updated on 24 January 2024

Anna Pernilla Ribeiro Novais (née Andersson; born 3 December 1971) is a Swedish stunt performer and former judoka. She won silver at the 2000 European Judo Championships, and competed in the women's lightweight event in the 2000 Summer Olympics in Sydney later the same year, and has also won several Swedish Champion titles.
