= Gudrun Hausch =

German judoka

Personal information
- Nationality: German
- Born: 23 August 1969 (age 55); Tübingen, Germany

Sport
- Sport: Judo

Gudrun Hausch (born 23 August 1969) is a German former judoka. She competed in the women's lightweight event at the 1992 Summer Olympics.
