= Vitalii Mihailov =

Moldovan judoka (born 1976)

Vitalii Mihailov (born 15 July 1976) is a Moldovan judoka.

== Achievements ==
Year	Tournament	Place	Weight class
2003	European Judo Championships	5th	Extra lightweight (60 kg)

== See also ==
- European Judo Championships
- History of martial arts
- List of judo techniques
- List of judoka
- Martial arts timeline
