= Inna Toropeyeva =

Soviet judoka

Personal information
- Nationality: Soviet
- Born: 1 May 1969 (age 55)

Sport
- Sport: Judo

Inna Toropeyeva (born 1 May 1969) is a Belarusan judoka. She competed in the women's lightweight event at the 1992 Summer Olympics.
