= Nicola Fairbrother =

British judoka (born 1970)

Nicola Fairbrother MBE
Personal information
- Nationality: British (English)
- Born: 14 May 1970 (age 56) Henley-on-Thames, Oxfordshire, England
- Occupation: Judoka
- Website: nicolafairbrother.com

Sport
- Country: Great Britain
- Sport: Judo
- Weight class: ‍–‍56 kg
- Rank: 8th dan black belt

Achievements and titles
- Olympic Games: (silver) (1992)
- World Champ.: (1993)
- European Champ.: (gold) (1992, 1993, 1995)
Medal record
Women's judo
Representing Great Britain
Olympic Games
Silver medal – second place	1992 Barcelona	‍–‍56 kg
World Championships
Gold medal – first place	1993 Hamilton	‍–‍56 kg
Bronze medal – third place	1991 Barcelona	‍–‍56 kg
European Championships
Gold medal – first place	1992 Paris	‍–‍56 kg
Gold medal – first place	1993 Athens	‍–‍56 kg
Gold medal – first place	1995 Birmingham	‍–‍56 kg
Silver medal – second place	1994 Gdansk	‍–‍56 kg
Bronze medal – third place	1990 Frankfurt	‍–‍56 kg
European Junior Championships
Gold medal – first place	1987 Wrocław	‍–‍52 kg
Silver medal – second place	1986 Leonding	‍–‍52 kg

Profile at external databases
- IJF: 53299
- JudoInside.com: 314
- Updated on 5 June 2023

Nicola Kim Fairbrother MBE (born 14 May 1970) is a retired judoka from the United Kingdom, who competed at two Olympic Games. She holds the 8th Dan and is one of Britain's most prominent judoka.

== Judo career ==
Fairbrother's first significant success was becoming champion of Great Britain, winning the lightweight division at the British Judo Championships in 1989. The following year she gained her first senior international success when she won a bronze medal at the 1990 European Judo Championships in Frankfurt.

In 1991, she won a bronze medal at the 1991 World Judo Championships in Barcelona and won back to back British titles in 1991 and 1992. During 1992, she was selected to represent Great Britain at the 1992 Summer Olympics. She won the silver medal in the women's lightweight division (– 56 kg). In the final she was defeated by Spain's Miriam Blasco, who later she married. Additionally, she won her first European title at the 1992 European Judo Championships in Paris.

The following year in 1993, she successfully defended her European crown and won her second World title, winning gold at the 1993 World Judo Championships in Hamilton. European silver in 1994 and European gold in 1995 added to the medal collection before she went to her second Olympic Games, the 1996 Summer Olympics, in Atlanta. In the women's 56 kg she was unlucky in that she drew the eventual gold medallist Driulis González in the quarter-finals.

In 1998 and 1999, she won her fourth and fifth British Championship titles. She retired from competitive judo at the end of 1999.

== Awards ==
In 1994, she was awarded the MBE for services to judo by HM The Queen.

== Personal life ==
Fairbrother is married to Miriam Blasco. She has authored a number of children's judo books and from 2001 to 2018 she was the editor of the Koka Kids Judo magazine.
