= Gulzat Uralbayeva =

Kazakhstani judoka (born 1989)

Personal information
- Nationality: Kazakhstan
- Born: 4 December 1989 (age 36) Astana, Kazakh SSR, Soviet Union
- Height: 1.59 m (5 ft 3 in)
- Weight: 57 kg (126 lb)

Sport
- Sport: Judo
- Event: 57 kg

Gulzat Uralbayeva (Kazakh: Гульзат Конысовна Уралбаева; born December 4, 1989, in Astana) is a Kazakhstani judoka, who played for the lightweight category. At age eighteen, Uralbayeva became the youngest judoka to represent Kazakhstan for the 2008 Summer Olympics, where she competed in the women's lightweight class (57 kg). She lost the first preliminary match to United States' Valerie Gotay, who successfully scored an ippon and a te gatame (hand arm lock), at one minute and forty-six seconds.
