= Orit Bar-On =

Israeli judoka (born 1975)

Personal information
- Native name: אורית בראון
- Born: 17 November 1975 (age 50) Netanya, Israel
- Occupation: Judoka

Sport
- Country: Israel
- Sport: Judo
- Weight class: ‍–‍56 kg, ‍–‍57 kg, ‍–‍63 kg
- Coached by: Yael Arad

Achievements and titles
- Olympic Games: R16 (2000)
- World Champ.: 7th (1999)
- European Champ.: 7th (1998)

Profile at external databases
- IJF: 53123
- JudoInside.com: 2757
- Updated on 6 February 2022

Orit Bar-On (Hebrew: אורית בראון; born 17 November 1975 to Trish Bar-On) is an Israeli judoka.

Bar-On was born in Netanya, Israel.

== Judo career ==
Bar-On was trained in judo by Israeli Olympic silver medalist Yael Arad. Bar-On won the national Israeli judo championships in 1990–2002, in weight classes ranging from U56 to U63.

In 1997 Bar-On won the gold medal at the Swedish Open Gothenburg (U56). In 1998, she won the Moscow International Tournament (U57). She finished in seventh place at both the 1998 European Championships and the 1999 World Championships.

In 2001, Bar-On won the gold medal at the German Open.

Bar-On competed for Israel at the 2000 Summer Olympics in Sydney, Australia, in Women's Lightweight Judo (57 kg division).
