= Prateep Pinitwong =

Thai judoka

Personal information
- Nationality: Thai
- Born: 25 June 1966 (age 58)

Sport
- Sport: Judo

Prateep Pinitwong (born 25 June 1966) is a Thai judoka. She competed in the women's lightweight event at the 1992 Summer Olympics.
