= Maniliz Segarra =

Puerto Rican judoka (born 1966)

Personal information
- Nationality: Puerto Rican
- Born: 27 February 1966 (age 60)

Sport
- Sport: Judo
Medal record
Representing Puerto Rico
Pan American Games
Bronze medal – third place	1991 Havana	Lightweight
Central American and Caribbean Games
Silver medal – second place	1986 Santiago	Lightweight

Maniliz Segarra Vásquez (born 27 February 1966) is a Puerto Rican judoka. She competed in the women's lightweight event at the 1992 Summer Olympics.
