= Miriam Blasco =

Spanish judoka and politician (born 1963)

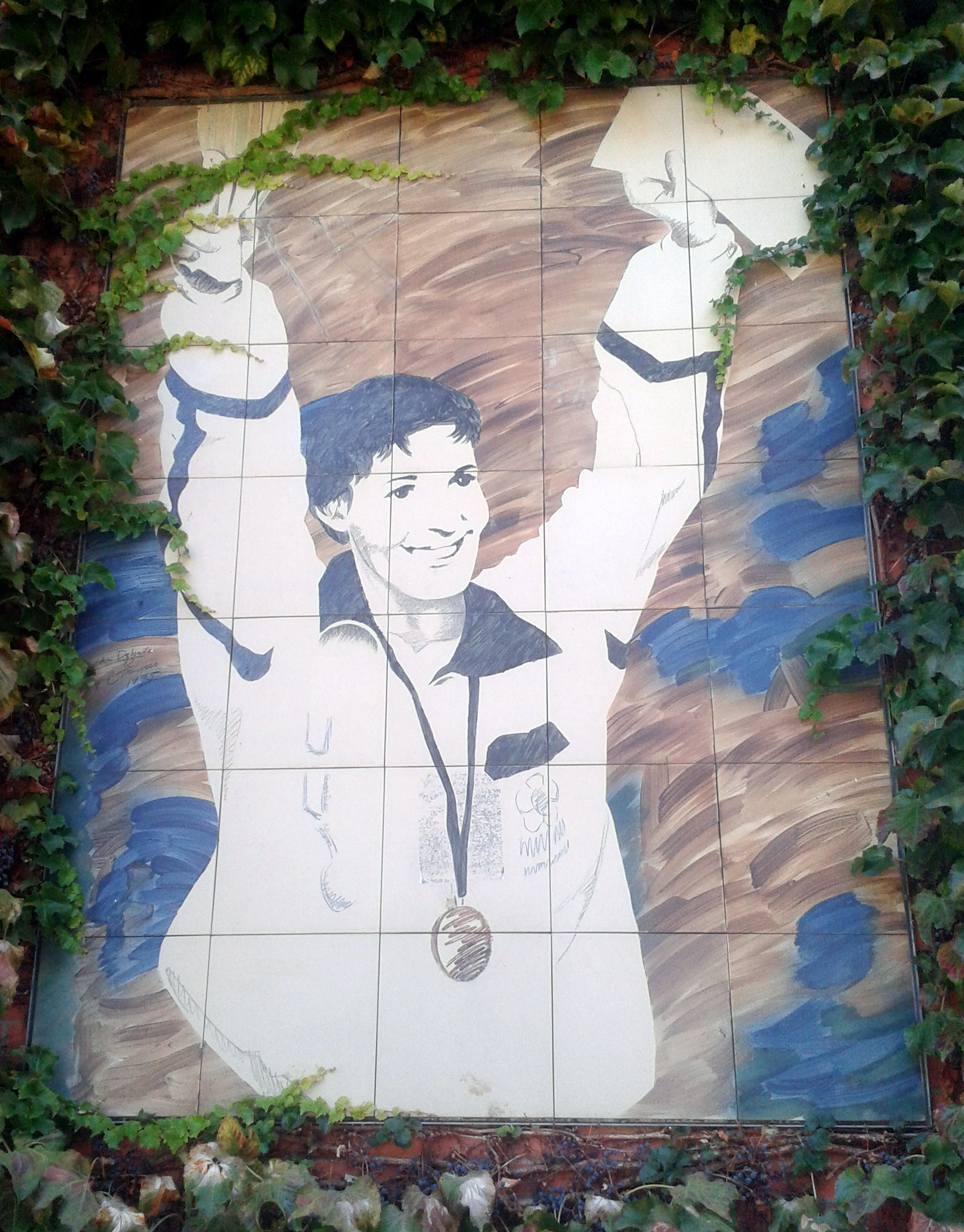

Personal information
- Full name: Miriam Blasco Soto
- Born: 12 December 1963 (age 62) Valladolid, Castile and León, Spain
- Occupations: Judoka, politician
- Spouse: Nicola Fairbrother (m. 2015)

Sport
- Country: Spain
- Sport: Judo
- Weight class: –56 kg, –61 kg

Achievements and titles
- Olympic Games: (gold) (1992)
- World Champ.: (1991)
- European Champ.: (gold) (1991)
Medal record
Women's judo
Representing Spain
Olympic Games
Gold medal – first place	1992 Barcelona	‍–‍56 kg
World Championships
Gold medal – first place	1991 Barcelona	‍–‍56 kg
Bronze medal – third place	1989 Belgrade	‍–‍56 kg
European Championships
Gold medal – first place	1991 Prague	‍–‍56 kg
Silver medal – second place	1988 Pamplona	‍–‍56 kg
Bronze medal – third place	1989 Helsinki	‍–‍56 kg
Bronze medal – third place	1992 Paris	‍–‍56 kg
Bronze medal – third place	1994 Gdansk	‍–‍61 kg

Profile at external databases
- IJF: 53806
- JudoInside.com: 3440
- Updated on 5 June 2023

Miriam Blasco Soto (born 12 December 1963) is a Spanish former professional judo competitor. She competed at the 1992 Summer Olympics in Barcelona, where she won the gold medal in Women's Judo in the 56 kg division. By doing so, she became Spain's first female Olympic champion and first female medalist. One of the major streets in her city of residence, Alicante, was named after her.

When her professional sport career finished, she became actively involved in politics. In 2000, 2004, and 2008, she was elected to the Spanish Senate for the conservative People's Party.

She is married to Nicola Fairbrother, her opponent in the 1992 Olympic judo women's final match.
