= Liu Chuang (judoka) =

Chinese judoka (born 1974)

Personal information
- Nationality: Chinese
- Born: 27 December 1974 (age 51)

Sport
- Sport: Judo

Liu Chuang (born 27 December 1974) is a Chinese judoka. She competed in the women's lightweight event at the 1996 Summer Olympics.
