= Law Lai Wah =

Hong Kong judoka

Personal information
- Nationality: Hong Konger
- Born: 22 August 1967 (age 57)

Sport
- Sport: Judo

Law Lai Wah (born 22 August 1967) is a Hong Kong judoka. She competed in the women's lightweight event at the 1992 Summer Olympics.
