= Catherine Arnaud =

French judoka (born 1963)

Personal information
- Born: 5 February 1963 (age 63) Bordeaux, France
- Occupation: Judoka

Sport
- Country: France
- Sport: Judo
- Weight class: –‍56 kg

Achievements and titles
- Olympic Games: (bronze) (1988)
- World Champ.: (1987, 1989)
- European Champ.: (gold) (1987, 1988, 1989, 1990)
Medal record
Women's judo
Representing France
Olympic Games
Bronze medal – third place	1988 Seoul	‍–‍56 kg
World Championships
Gold medal – first place	1987 Essen	‍–‍56 kg
Gold medal – first place	1989 Belgrade	‍–‍56 kg
Bronze medal – third place	1984 Vienna	‍–‍56 kg
European Championships
Gold medal – first place	1987 Paris	‍–‍56 kg
Gold medal – first place	1988 Pamplona	‍–‍56 kg
Gold medal – first place	1989 Helsinki	‍–‍56 kg
Gold medal – first place	1990 Frankfurt	‍–‍56 kg
Bronze medal – third place	1991 Prague	‍–‍56 kg
Bronze medal – third place	1992 Paris	‍–‍56 kg

Profile at external databases
- IJF: 38764
- JudoInside.com: 2398
- Updated on 18 June 2023

Catherine Arnaud (born 5 February 1963) is a French judoka.

She has been the World judo champion in 1987 and 1989 and European Champion in 1987, 1988, 1989 and 1990. Arnaud competed in the women's lightweight event at the 1992 Summer Olympics.
