= Zulfiya Garipova =

Russian judoka

Personal information
- Nationality: Russian
- Born: 20 November 1969 (age 55); Kazan, Russia

Sport
- Sport: Judo

Zulfiya Garipova (born 20 November 1969) is a Russian judoka. She competed in the women's lightweight event at the 1996 Summer Olympics.
