= Constantin Cojoc =

Romanian judoka (born 1981)

Personal information
- Born: 30 May 1981 (age 45)
- Occupation: Judoka

Sport
- Sport: Judo

Profile at external databases
- IJF: 58541
- JudoInside.com: 11207

Constantin Cojoc (born 30 May 1981) is a Romanian judoka.

== Achievements ==
Year	Tournament	Place	Weight class
2003	European Judo Championships	7th	Half middleweight (81 kg)
