= Judo at the 2013 Games of the Small States of Europe =

Judo Judo at the 2013 Games of the Small States of Europe
- Location: Limpertsberg, Luxembourg
- Dates: 28–30 May 2013

Competition at external databases
- Links: JudoInside

Judo competitions at the 2013 Games of the Small States of Europe were held from 28 to 30 May 2013 in Limpertsberg, Luxembourg.

== Medal summary ==
=== Medal table ===
* Host nation (Luxembourg)

Rank	Nation	Gold	Silver	Bronze	Total
1	Luxembourg*	6	0	2	8
2	Montenegro	3	0	0	3
3	Andorra	1	1	0	2
3	San Marino	1	1	0	2
5	Cyprus	1	0	0	1
6	Liechtenstein	0	6	1	7
7	Malta	0	2	5	7
8	Monaco	0	1	4	5
9	Iceland	0	1	2	3
Totals (9 entries)		12	12	14	38

=== Men's events ===
Event	Gold	Silver	Bronze
Extra-lightweight (60 kg)	Irodotos Kelpis (CYP)	Cédric Siccardi (MON)	not awarded
Half-lightweight (66 kg)	Nikola Gusić (MNE)	Jeremy Saywell (MLT)	Guillaume Ereseo (MON)
Lightweight (73 kg)	Daniel García González (AND)	Paolo Persoglia (SMR)	Murman Korchilava (MLT)
Lightweight (73 kg)	Daniel García González (AND)	Paolo Persoglia (SMR)	Matthias Rietzler (LIE)
Half-middleweight (81 kg)	Srđan Mrvaljević (MNE)	Sveinbjorn Jun Iura (ISL)	Jerome Mas (MON)
Half-middleweight (81 kg)	Srđan Mrvaljević (MNE)	Sveinbjorn Jun Iura (ISL)	Jean-Luc Muller (LUX)
Middleweight (90 kg)	Denis Leider (LUX)	Mirko Kaiser (LIE)	Isaac Bezzina (MLT)
Middleweight (90 kg)	Denis Leider (LUX)	Mirko Kaiser (LIE)	Þorvaldur Blondal (ISL)
Half-heavyweight (100 kg)	Karim Gharbi (SMR)	David Buchel (LIE)	Georges Simon (LUX)
Team	Luxembourg	Malta	Iceland
Team	Luxembourg	Malta	Monaco

=== Women's events ===
Event	Gold	Silver	Bronze
Half-lightweight (52 kg)	Marie Muller (LUX)	Nadine Thoeny (LIE)	Yamina Allag (MON)
Lightweight (57 kg)	Tanja Božović (MNE)	Judith Biedermann (LIE)	Joanna Camilleri (MLT)
Half-middleweight (63 kg)	Taylor King (LUX)	Laura Salles Lopez (AND)	Marcon Bezzina (MLT)
Middleweight (70 kg)	Lynn Mossong (LUX)	Tatjana Buchel (LIE)	not awarded
Team	Luxembourg	Liechtenstein	Malta
