= Rose Marie Kouaho =

Ivorian judoka (born 1977)

Personal information
- Nationality: Ivorian
- Born: 27 October 1977 (age 47)

Sport
- Sport: Judo

Rose Marie Kouaho (born 27 October 1977) is an Ivorian judoka. She competed in the women's lightweight event at the 2000 Summer Olympics.
