= Corinna West =

American judoka

Personal information
- Born: March 13, 1974 (age 52) Colorado Springs, Colorado, United States

Sport
- Sport: Judo
Medal record
Representing United States
Pan American Games
Silver medal – second place	1995 Mar del Plata	Lightweight

Corinna West (née Corinna Broz and also known as Corinna Broz-West; born March 13, 1974) is an American retired judo and Olympian. The first competition she participated in was at the 1996 Summer Olympics in Atlanta in the women's 56 kg event where she finished 13th.

In 1995, West was named "Outstanding Female Competitor" in United States Judo Association's Hall of Fame.
