= Barbara Eck =

Austrian judoka

Personal information
- Nationality: Austrian
- Born: 6 May 1968 (age 56); Wagna, Austria
- Occupation: Judoka

Sport
- Sport: Judo

Profile at external databases
- JudoInside.com: 3191

Barbara Eck (born 6 May 1968) is an Austrian judoka. She competed in the women's lightweight event at the 1992 Summer Olympics.
