= Maria Gontowicz-Szałas =

Polish judoka (born 1965)

Personal information
- Born: 23 February 1965 (age 61) Gorzów Wielkopolski, Poland
- Occupation: Judoka

Sport
- Country: Poland
- Sport: Judo
- Weight class: ‍–‍56 kg

Achievements and titles
- Olympic Games: 7th (1992)
- World Champ.: (silver) (1986)
- European Champ.: (silver) (1989)
Medal record
Women's judo
Representing Poland
World Championships
Silver medal – second place	1986 Maastricht	‍–‍56 kg
European Championships
Silver medal – second place	1989 Helsinki	‍–‍56 kg
Bronze medal – third place	1985 Landskrona	‍–‍56 kg
Bronze medal – third place	1986 London	‍–‍56 kg
Bronze medal – third place	1987 Paris	‍–‍56 kg

Profile at external databases
- IJF: 53794
- JudoInside.com: 1108
- Updated on 10 July 2024

Maria Gontowicz-Szałas (born 23 February 1965) is a Polish judoka. She competed in the women's lightweight event at the 1992 Summer Olympics.
