= Chiyori Masuchi =

Japanese judoka (born 1970)

Personal information
- Born: Chiyori Tateno; 25 June 1970 (age 56) Moriguchi, Osaka
- Occupation: Judoka
- Spouse: Katsuyuki Masuchi

Sport
- Country: Japan
- Sport: Judo
- Weight class: –‍56 kg

Achievements and titles
- Olympic Games: (bronze) (1992)
- World Champ.: (silver) (1993)
- Asian Champ.: (silver) (1991, 1995)
Medal record
Women's judo
Representing Japan
Olympic Games
Bronze medal – third place	1992 Barcelona	‍–‍56 kg
World Championships
Silver medal – second place	1993 Hamilton	‍–‍56 kg
Bronze medal – third place	1997 Paris	‍–‍56 kg
Asian Championships
Silver medal – second place	1991 Osaka	‍–‍56 kg
Silver medal – second place	1995 New Delhi	‍–‍56 kg
Bronze medal – third place	1996 Ho Chi Minh	‍–‍56 kg
Summer Universiade
Silver medal – second place	1995 Fukuoka	‍–‍56 kg

Profile at external databases
- IJF: 13894
- JudoInside.com: 2973
- Updated on 5 June 2023

Chiyori Masuchi (増地 千代里, Masuchi Chiyori; née Tateno (立野); born 25 June 1970 in Moriguchi, Osaka) is a retired Japanese judoka.

== Career ==
She won a bronze medal in the 56 kg division at the 1992 Summer Olympics in Barcelona, Spain. In the bronze medal match, she defeated Belgium's Nicole Flagothier.

== Personal life ==
Masuchi's husband, Katsuyuki, won a gold medal at the 1994 Asian Games in judo. Their son, Ryotaro won a gold medal in judo at the 2026 Asian Games.
