= Marie-Josée Morneau =

Canadian judoka

Personal information
- Born: 4 December 1969 (age 55); Longueuil, Quebec, Canada
- Occupation: Judoka

Sport
- Sport: Judo

Profile at external databases
- JudoInside.com: 6338

Marie-Josée Morneau (born 4 December 1969) is a Canadian judoka. She competed in the women's lightweight event at the 1996 Summer Olympics.

== See also ==
- Judo in Quebec
- Judo in Canada
- List of Canadian judoka
