= Jin Xianglan =

Chinese judoka (born 1972)

Personal information
- Nationality: Chinese
- Born: 26 December 1972 (age 53)

Sport
- Sport: Judo

Jin Xianglan (born 26 December 1972) is a Chinese judoka. She competed in the women's lightweight event at the 1992 Summer Olympics.
