= Huang Ai-chun =

Taiwanese judoka (born 1974)

Personal information
- Nationality: Taiwanese
- Born: 16 May 1974 (age 50)

Sport
- Sport: Judo

Huang Ai-chun (born 16 May 1974) is a Taiwanese judoka. She competed in the women's lightweight event at the 1996 Summer Olympics.
