= Pascale Mainville =

Canadian judoka

Personal information
- Born: 29 March 1973 (age 51); Montreal, Quebec, Canada
- Occupation: Judoka

Sport
- Sport: Judo

Profile at external databases
- JudoInside.com: 833

Pascale Mainville (born 29 March 1973) is a Canadian judoka. She competed in the women's lightweight event at the 1992 Summer Olympics.

== See also ==
- Judo in Canada
- List of Canadian judoka
