= Jemina Alves =

Brazilian judoka (born 1964)

Personal information
- Born: 1 October 1964 (age 60); Recife, Brazil

Sport
- Sport: Judo

Jemina Augusto Alves (born 1 October 1964) is a Brazilian former judoka. Alves competed in the women's lightweight event at the 1992 Summer Olympics.
