= Françoise Nguele =

Cameroonian judoka

Françoise Nguele (born 30 September 1980) is a Cameroonian former judoka who competed in the 2000 Summer Olympics.
