= Jessica García (taekwondo) =

Mexican para-taekwondo athlete

Personal information
- Full name: Jessica Berenice García Quijano
- Born: 23 September 1995 (age 30) Mérida, Yucatán, Mexico

Sport
- Country: Mexico
- Sport: Para taekwondo
- Disability class: K44
- Event: −52 kg
Medal record
Women's para taekwondo
Representing Mexico
World Championships
Gold medal – first place	2023 Veracruz	−52 kg
European Championships
Gold medal – first place	2022 Manchester	K44 −52 kg
Asian Championships
Silver medal – second place	2024 Da Nang	−52 kg
Parapan American Games
Silver medal – second place	2023 Santiago	−52 kg

Jessica Berenice García Quijano (born 23 September 1995) is a Mexican para-taekwondo athlete.

== Early life ==
Garcia was born in Mérida, Yucatán, on 23 September 1995. When she was eight, her father put her in a taekwondo school in Mérida, Yucatán. From 2003 to 2015, she trained with able-bodied opponents to gain experience.

== Career ==
In 2022, she finished second in the world rankings in her category.

She won the 52 kg category, defeating Egyptian Salma Ali Abd 3–1, in the 2023 World Para-Taekwondo Championships held in Boca del Río, Veracruz. Thus she became the first Mexican woman world champion in this discipline. She also won a silver, in the K44-52, at the Parapan American games at Santiago, Chile in November 2023.

In 2024, she won a silver medal at the 9th Asian Taekwondo Championships at city of Da Nang, Vietnam, in the K44 -52 kg category after losing in the final to Surenjav Ulambayar of Mongolia.

Before the Tokyo Paralympics, she moved to Mexico City to train at the National High Performance Center (CNAR). In her debut at the Paralympics in Paris 2024, she finished fifth.

== See also ==
- Daniela Martínez Mariscal
