= Tânia Ferreira =

Brazilian judoka (born 1974)

Personal information
- Born: July 17, 1974 (age 51)
- Occupation: Judoka

Sport
- Sport: Judo
Medal record
Women's Judo wrestling
Representing Brazil
Pan American Games
Bronze medal – third place	2003 Santo Domingo	Lightweight
South American Games
Gold medal – first place	2002 Rio de Janeiro	Lightweight

Profile at external databases
- JudoInside.com: 11387

Tânia Ferreira (born July 17, 1974, in Santos, São Paulo) is a female judoka and wrestler from Brazil. She won the bronze medal in the women's lightweight division (– 57 kg) at the 2003 Pan American Games in Santo Domingo, Dominican Republic and also two gold medals in South American games in Venezuela and Brazil. She represented her native country at the Judo at the 2000 Summer Olympics in Sydney, Australia. She achieved 21 results in judo and also continental results in wrestling.
