= Ryotaro Masuchi =

Japanese judoka (born 2002)

Personal information
- Born: 19 March 2002 (age 24)
- Occupation: Judoka

Sport
- Country: Japan
- Sport: Judo
- Weight class: ‍–‍100 kg
Medal record
Men's judo
Representing Japan
Asian Games
Gold medal – first place	2026 Aichi‑Nagoya	‍–‍100 kg
IJF Grand Slam
Bronze medal – third place	2025 Tokyo	‍–‍100 kg

Profile at external databases
- IJF: 96427
- JudoInside.com: 172802
- Updated on 4 October 2026

Ryotaro Masuchi (増地遼汰朗, Masuchi Ryotaro; born 19 March 2002) is a Japanese judoka.

== Career ==
In October 2026, Masuchi competed at the 2026 Asian Games and won a gold medal in the –100 kg category.

== Personal life ==
Masuchi comes from a judoka family. His father, Katsuyuki Masuchi, won a gold medal at the 1994 Asian Games, while his mother, Chiyori Masuchi, won a bronze medal at the 1992 Summer Olympics.
