= Raoudha Chaari =

Tunisian judoka (born 1973)

Personal information
- Nationality: Tunisian
- Born: 4 February 1973 (age 52)

Sport
- Sport: Judo

Raoudha Chaari (born 4 February 1973) is a Tunisian judoka. She competed in the women's lightweight event at the 1996 Summer Olympics.
