= Kate Donahoo =

American judoka

Personal information
- Born: March 27, 1966 (age 60) Las Vegas, Nevada, United States

Sport
- Sport: Judo
Medal record
Representing United States
Pan American Games
Gold medal – first place	1991 Havana	Lightweight

Kate Marie Donahoo (born March 27, 1966) is a former Olympic-level judoka for the United States.
