= Rudymar Fleming =

Venezuelan judoka (born 1980)

Personal information
- Born: October 26, 1980 (age 45)
- Occupation: Judoka

Sport
- Sport: Judo
Medal record
Women's Judo
Representing Venezuela
Pan American Games
| Silver medal – second place | 2003 | Lightweight |

Profile at external databases
- JudoInside.com: 10001

Rudymar Fleming Pernil (born October 26, 1980) is a female judoka from Venezuela, who won the silver medal in the women's lightweight division (– 57 kg) at the 2003 Pan American Games in Santo Domingo, Dominican Republic. She represented her native country at the 2004 Summer Olympics in Athens, Greece.
