= Marcon Bezzina =

Maltese judoka

Personal information
- Born: 11 September 1985 (age 40)
- Occupation: Judoka

Sport
- Sport: Judo
Medal record
Women's Judo
Representing Malta
Games of the Small States of Europe
Bronze medal – third place	2013 Luxembourg	63 kg
Bronze medal – third place	2013 Luxembourg	Team
Bronze medal – third place	2015 Iceland	63 kg

Marcon Bezzina (born 11 September 1985) is a Maltese judoka.

She originally competed in the lightweight (−57 kg) class. She competed at the 2004 Olympic Games, lost her first match, reached the repechage round, but lost again. She later switched to the half middleweight (−63 kg) class. She won a bronze medal at the 2006 Commonwealth Championships, and was the Maltese flagbearer at the 2008 Olympic Games. In the Olympic tournament she lost her first match, and did not reach the repechage.
