= Nicole Flagothier =

Belgian judoka

Personal information
- Born: 9 January 1966 (age 60) Rocourt, Belgium
- Occupation: Judoka

Sport
- Country: Belgium
- Sport: Judo
- Weight class: –52 kg, –56 kg
- Rank: 6th dan black belt

Achievements and titles
- Olympic Games: 5th (1992)
- World Champ.: (silver) (1991)
- European Champ.: (silver) (1992)
Medal record
Women's judo
Representing Belgium
World Championships
Silver medal – second place	1991 Barcelona	–56 kg
Bronze medal – third place	1997 Paris	–52 kg
European Championships
Silver medal – second place	1992 Paris	–56 kg
Bronze medal – third place	1990 Frankfurt	–56 kg
Bronze medal – third place	1993 Athens	–56 kg
Bronze medal – third place	1996 The Hague	–52 kg

Profile at external databases
- IJF: 31357
- JudoInside.com: 161
- Updated on 13 March 2023

Nicole Flagothier (born 9 January 1966) is a Belgian judoka. She competed in the women's lightweight event at the 1992 Summer Olympics.
