= Valerie Gotay =

American judoka (born 1973)

Personal information
- Born: November 5, 1973 (age 52) San Diego, California, United States

Sport
- Sport: Judo
Medal record
Representing United States
Women's judo
Pan American Games
Silver medal – second place	1991 Havana	48 kg
Silver medal – second place	2007 Rio de Janeiro	57 kg
Pan American Judo Championships
Gold medal – first place	2005 Caguas	57 kg
Gold medal – first place	2007 Montreal	57 kg
Gold medal – first place	2008 Miami	57 kg
Bronze medal – third place	2006 Buenos Aires	57 kg

Valerie Lafon-Gotay (born November 5, 1973) is a former judoka from the United States.

== Biography ==
Gotay was born in San Diego. Her grandfather Piere Lafon and father Gerald Lafon are former judoplayers so she had good background for judo from youth. She began competing at age of 14.

At 18 years old, Gotay was supposed to compete in the 1992 Summer Olympics in extra-lightweight category. Unfortunately, after working hard to lose some kilos to make her weight category, she became extremely sick with uncontrollable and violent muscle contractions which forced her to withdraw from the competition.

She decided to stop competing after Barcelona.

Gotay later married and has two children Breanna (1996) and Isabella (2001).

In 2004, she came out of retirement. "I missed the training," Gotay said. "I'm a pretty intense person. I love training. I missed training for something, having a goal and working toward it. I came back not even knowing I was coming back."

She was invited to compete in the British Open and in 2007 was part of the United States team at the Pan American Games.

== Judo ==
At the 2008 Olympic Games in Beijing, she was eliminated in the second round by Isabel Fernández from Spain. Gotay went to Beijing with big (medal) ambitions, but it was not a very good tournament for her. She had already had problems in first round with Gulzat Uralbayeva from Kazakhstan. With three minutes left, she got a second chance, because the Kazakh judoka scored only wazaari, rather than ippon. After this score, the young Kazakh judoka became very passive. Gotay took advantage of this passivity and won by ippon with one minute remaining.

== Achievements ==
Year	Tournament	Place	Weight class
1992	Olympic Games	DNS	Extra-Lightweight (- 48 kg)
1996	Olympic Games	DNS	-
2000	Olympic Games	DNS	-
2004	Olympic Games	DNS	-
2008	Olympic Games	15th	Lightweight (- 57 kg)

Year	Tournament	Place	Weight class
2007	Pan American Games	2nd	Lightweight (- 57 kg)

Year	Tournament	Place	Weight class
2005	Pan American Judo Championships	1st	Lightweight (- 57 kg)
2006	Pan American Judo Championships	3rd	Lightweight (- 57 kg)
2007	Pan American Judo Championships	1st	Lightweight (- 57 kg)
2008	Pan American Judo Championships	1st	Lightweight (- 57 kg)
