= Xu Yan (judoka) =

Chinese judoka (born 1981)

Personal information
- Born: 4 November 1981 (age 44)
- Occupation: Judoka

Sport
- Country: China
- Sport: Judo
- Weight class: –57 kg

Achievements and titles
- Olympic Games: (bronze) (2008)
- World Champ.: 7th (2003)
- Asian Champ.: (gold) (2006)
Medal record
Women's judo
Representing China
Olympic Games
Bronze medal – third place	2008 Beijing	‍–‍57 kg
Asian Games
Gold medal – first place	2006 Doha	‍–‍57 kg
Asian Championships
Silver medal – second place	2007 Kuwait City	‍–‍57 kg

Profile at external databases
- IJF: 52710
- JudoInside.com: 15206
- Updated on 30 May 2023

Xu Yan (simplified Chinese: 许岩; traditional Chinese: 許岩; pinyin: Xǔ Yán; born 4 November 1981 in Beijing) is a female Chinese judoka who competed at the 2008 Summer Olympics in the Lightweight (‍–‍57 kg) event.

== Major performances ==
- 2003 World Championships - 7th -57 kg class;
- 2003 Asian Championships - 5th -57 kg class;
- 2005 European Tour Korea - 3rd -57 kg class;
- 2006 World Cup Team Tournament - 3rd;
- 2007 World Team Championships - 1st;
- 2008 Paris Super World Cup - 2nd -57 kg class

== See also ==
- China at the 2008 Summer Olympics
