= Gooitske Marsman =

Dutch judoka

Personal information
- Nationality: Dutch
- Born: 7 April 1965 (age 59); Vlaardingen, Netherlands

Sport
- Sport: Judo

Gooitske Marsman (born 7 April 1965) is a Dutch judoka. She competed in the women's lightweight event at the 1992 Summer Olympics.
