= Danuše Zdeňková =

Czech judoka

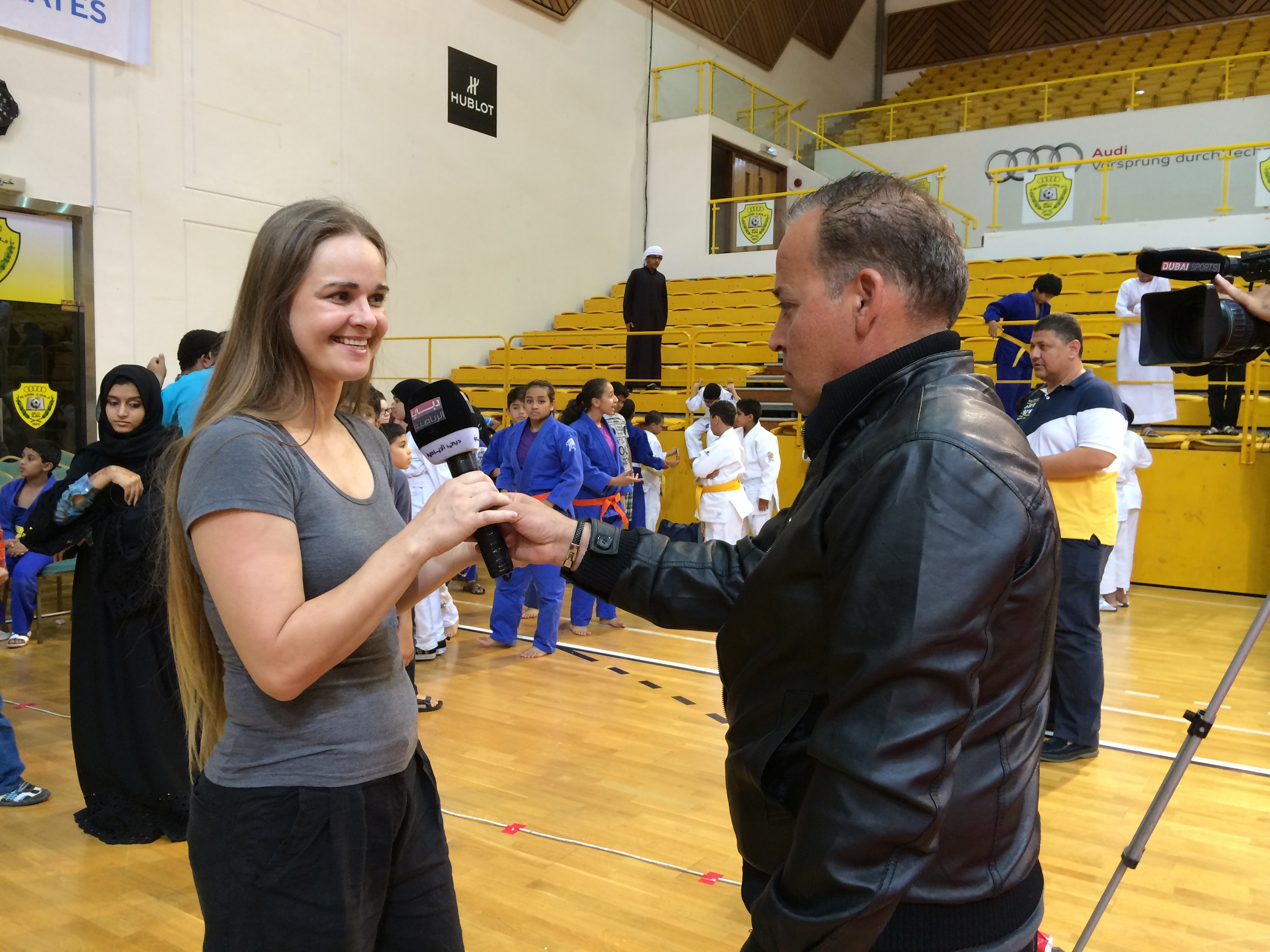

Personal information
- Born: 5 July 1976 (age 48)
- Occupation: Judoka

Sport
- Sport: Judo

Profile at external databases
- JudoInside.com: 3517

Danuše Zdeňková (born 5 July 1976) is a Czech martial artist. She is a multiple Czech champion in judo and sambo, and 2005 European champion in sambo.

== Early life ==
Zdeňková was born on 5 July 1976 in Šumperk, Czechoslovakia. She started her judo career at the Czech Interior Ministry's Olympic Training Centre in Hradec Králové, under national team coach Pavel Petřikov.

== Sporting career ==
Zdeňková represented the Czech Republic in judo at the international level as a junior at -63 kg. She was a regular World Championship and European Championships participant. In 2003, she was named Judoka of the Year. In the spring of 2004, she switched to the similar sport sambo.

From 2004 to 2005 she was the coach of the Czech National Sambo Team. In 2005, she became Vice President of the Czech Sambo Federation. Her best results in this period included a 3rd-place finish in the 2004 Sambo World Championships in Chișinău, Moldova, a 1st place in the 2005 European Sambo Championships in Moscow, Russia, and a 2nd place in the 2005 European Kurash Championships in Thessaloniki, Greece. She has also been Czech National Champion multiple times in both judo and sambo.

== Coaching successes ==
- 1 x 3rd place, 2 x 7th place World Championships in Sambo 2004 Chișinău, Moldova
- 1 x 1st place, 1 x 3rd place, 1 x 5th place World Junior Championships in Sambo, 2004 Tashkent, Uzbekistan
- 1 x 2nd place, 2 x 3rd place European Championships in Kurash, 2005, Thessaloniki, Greece
- 3 x 1st place, 3 x 2nd place, Holand Open in Sambo2005 Ommen, Netherlands
- 1 x 2nd place, 1 x 3rd place, Madrid Open 2005 Spain
