= Marisabel Lomba =

Belgian judoka (born 1974)

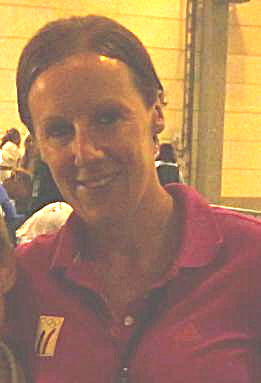
- Marie-Isabelle Lomba at the International Hainaut Cup Judo, 8 October 2011

Personal information
- Born: 17 August 1974 (age 52)
- Occupation: Judoka

Sport
- Country: Belgium
- Sport: Judo
- Weight class: ‍–‍56 kg

Achievements and titles
- Olympic Games: (bronze) (1996)
- World Champ.: 5th (1995, 1997)
- European Champ.: (gold) (1997)
Medal record
Women's judo
Representing Belgium
Olympic Games
Bronze medal – third place	1996 Atlanta	‍–‍56 kg
European Championships
Gold medal – first place	1997 Oostende	‍–‍56 kg

Profile at external databases
- IJF: 53116
- JudoInside.com: 178
- Updated on 4 June 2023

Marie-Isabelle "Marisabel" Lomba (born 17 August 1974) is a Belgian judoka and Olympic medalist. She competed at the 1996 Summer Olympics in Atlanta, winning a bronze medal in the lightweight class. She also competed at the 2000 Summer Olympics.

== Career ==
Born in Charleroi, Lomba was a 7 time Belgian judo champion (1993, 1994, 1995, 1997, 2001, 2002). She competed mainly in the categories -56 kg, -57 kg and -60 kg. In 1997 she won the gold medal in the European Championship in the category -56 kg. In 1999 and 2001 she won the gold medal at the European Championship for teams, in 1997 silver and in 1994 and 2000 she won the bronze medal in the European Championship for teams. The high point of her career was winning the bronze medal in the -56 kg category at the 1996 Summer Olympics in Atlanta.
