= Katsuyuki Masuchi =

Japanese judoka (born 1970)

Personal information
- Born: 29 September 1970 (age 56)
- Occupation: Judoka

Sport
- Sport: Judo
Medal record
Representing Japan
Men's Judo
Asian Games
Gold medal – first place	1994 Hiroshima	Open
Asian Championships
Gold medal – first place	1997 Manila	Open
Universiade
Gold medal – first place	1995 Fukuoka	Open

Profile at external databases
- JudoInside.com: 1022

Katsuyuki Masuchi (増地 克之, Masuchi Katsuyuki; born 29 September 1970) is a retired Japanese judoka.

== Career ==
Masuchi is from Tsu, Mie. He began judo at the age of a 10 and after graduation from Tsukuba University, He belonged to Marunaka and Nippon Steel.

He became Asian champion of openweight category in 1994, 1997. He also participated All-Japan Judo Championships 13 times, and the record is the most in history.

Masuchi is on the faculty of his alma mater Tsukuba University, and has served as the judo coach of the women's national team.

== Personal life ==
Masuchi's wife, Chiyori is a bronze medalist at the 1992 Summer Olympics in judo. Their son, Ryotaro, won a gold medal in judo at the 2026 Asian Games.
