= Zulfiyya Huseynova =

Azerbaijani Olympic judoka

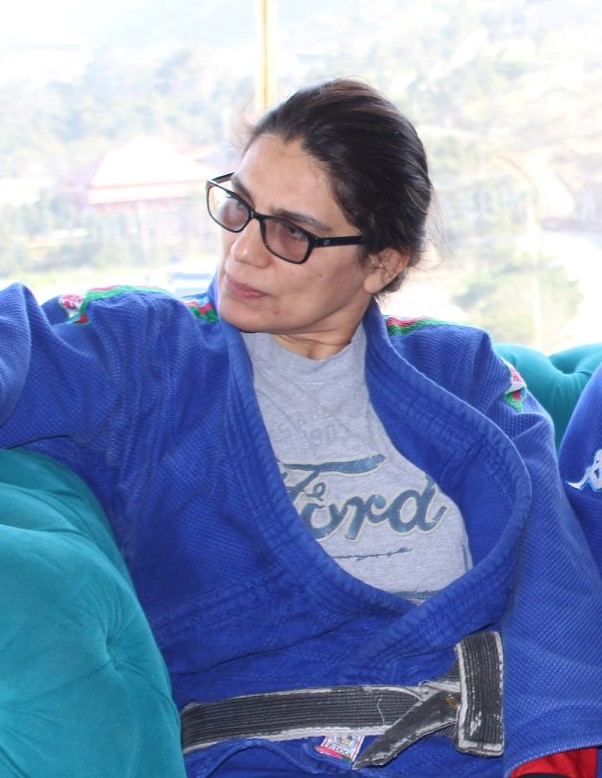
Zulfiyya Huseynova in 2020

Zulfiyya Huseynova (Azerbaijani: Zülfiyyə Yusif qızı Hüseynova ; born 15 October 1970) is an Azerbaijani former judoka who competed in the 1996 Summer Olympics and in the 2000 Summer Olympics.
