= Sophie Cox =

British judoka (born 1981)

Personal information
- Born: 23 December 1981 (age 44)
- Occupation: Judoka

Sport
- Sport: Judo
- Weight class: –52 kg, –57 kg

Achievements and titles
- Olympic Games: 9th (2004)
- World Champ.: R32 (2005, 2010, 2011)
- European Champ.: (silver) (2004, 2005)
Medal record
Representing Great Britain
European Championships
Silver medal – second place	2004 Bucharest	–57 kg
Silver medal – second place	2005 Rotterdam	–57 kg
Bronze medal – third place	2003 Düsseldorf	–57 kg
Bronze medal – third place	2011 Istanbul	–52 kg
IJF Grand Prix
Bronze medal – third place	2011 Amsterdam	–52 kg
European Junior Championships
Bronze medal – third place	2000 Nicosia	–57 kg

Profile at external databases
- IJF: 45736
- JudoInside.com: 9061
- Updated on 17 February 2022

Sophie Cox (born 1981) is a British judo player from Rochdale, Greater Manchester, England. She represented Great Britain at the 2004 Summer Olympics in Greece.

== Judo career ==
Cox became champion of Great Britain, winning the lightweight division at the British Judo Championships in 2001. The following year she successfully defended her title and won further titles in 2004 and 2005. She also won two silver medals at consecutive European Judo Championships; in the 2004 European Judo Championships in Romania and the 2005 European Judo Championships in the Netherlands. These came after a bronze medal in 2003. Cox temporarily suspended her judo career in 2005.

During this successful period she was selected to represent Great Britain at the 2004 Olympic Games in Greece, competing in the women's 57 kg category she reached the quarter-finals before losing to eventual bronze medallist Kye Sun-hui. She returned to form in 2011, after dropping to half-lightweight. In 2011, she won one of the bronze medals in the 2011 European Judo Championships in Turkey and won her fifth British Championship title.

In 2012, she represented Team GB at the London 2012 Olympic Games, held at ExCeL London, being knocked out in the first round by Kum Ae An who went on to win the gold medal, in the under 52 kg category. She later won her sixth and final British Championship.

== Coaching ==
Cox now coaches judo, judo for BJJ and no-gi grappling as well as training in and competing in Brazilian Jiu-Jitsu. She travels all over the UK and Europe to teach and coach but is mostly based in the North West, Rochdale, Stockport, Manchester and Kendal.
