= Ude hishigi te gatame =

Judo technique

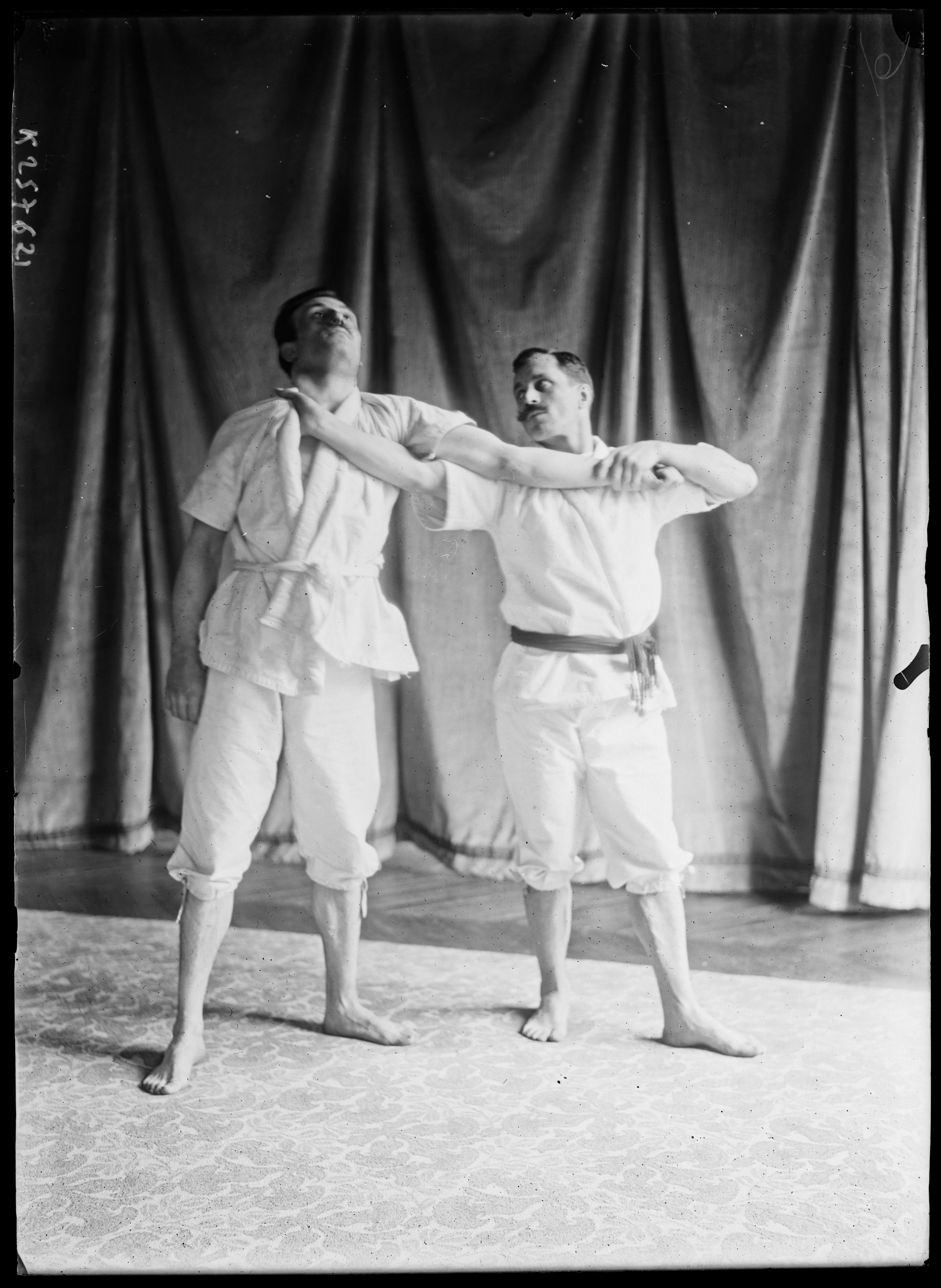
- Classification: Katame-waza
- Sub classification: Kansetsu-waza
- Kodokan: Yes

Technique name
- Rōmaji: Ude-hishigi-te-gatame
- Japanese: 腕挫手固
- English: Hand armlock

Ude-Hishigi-Te-Gatame (腕挫手固) is one of the official 29 grappling techniques of Kodokan Judo. It is one of the nine joint techniques of the Kansetsu-waza list, one of the three grappling lists in Judo's Katame-waza enumerating 29 grappling techniques.

== Technique Description ==
Photo from http://www.chez.com/judopassion/pages/technique/techn%20sol/kansetsu.htm

== Similar Techniques, Variants, and Aliases ==
IJF Official Names:

- Ude-hishigi-te-gatame(腕挫手固)
- U.H. te-gatame
- Te-gatame(手固)
- TGT

Variants:

- Ude-garami-henka-waza(腕緘変化技)

Examples of contest this finished

- Tel Aviv Grand Prix 2020 U60kg Semi-Final

Loss Dai Aoki(Japan) (01:35 Te-gatame) Kim Won-jin(South Korea) Win IJF movie

- Kami-hiza-gatame(上膝固)
- Yoko-hiza-gatame(横膝固)
- Pillow armlock(V2 armlock)
- Telephone armlock
- Shoulder arm breaker

Alias:

- Hand armlock

== Included Systems ==
Systems:

- Kodokan Judo, Judo Lists

Lists:

- Judo technique
- The video, The Essence of Judo featuring Kyuzo Mifune
  - Ude-Garami(4th pattern)(腕緘 その四)
