= Ellen Wilson (judoka) =

American judoka (born 1976)

Personal information
- Born: January 8, 1976 (age 50)
- Occupation: Judoka

Sport
- Sport: Judo
Medal record
Women's Judo
Representing the United States
Pan American Games
Bronze medal – third place	Santo Domingo 2003	Lightweight

Profile at external databases
- JudoInside.com: 3600

Ellen Bernice Wilson (born January 8, 1976, in Salinas, California) is a female judoka from the United States, who won the silver medal in the women's lightweight division (– 57 kg) at the 2003 Pan American Games in Santo Domingo, Dominican Republic. She represented her native country at two consecutive Summer Olympics, starting in 2000 in Sydney, Australia.
