= Yvonne Bönisch =

German judo coach and former judoka

Yvonne Snir-Bönisch
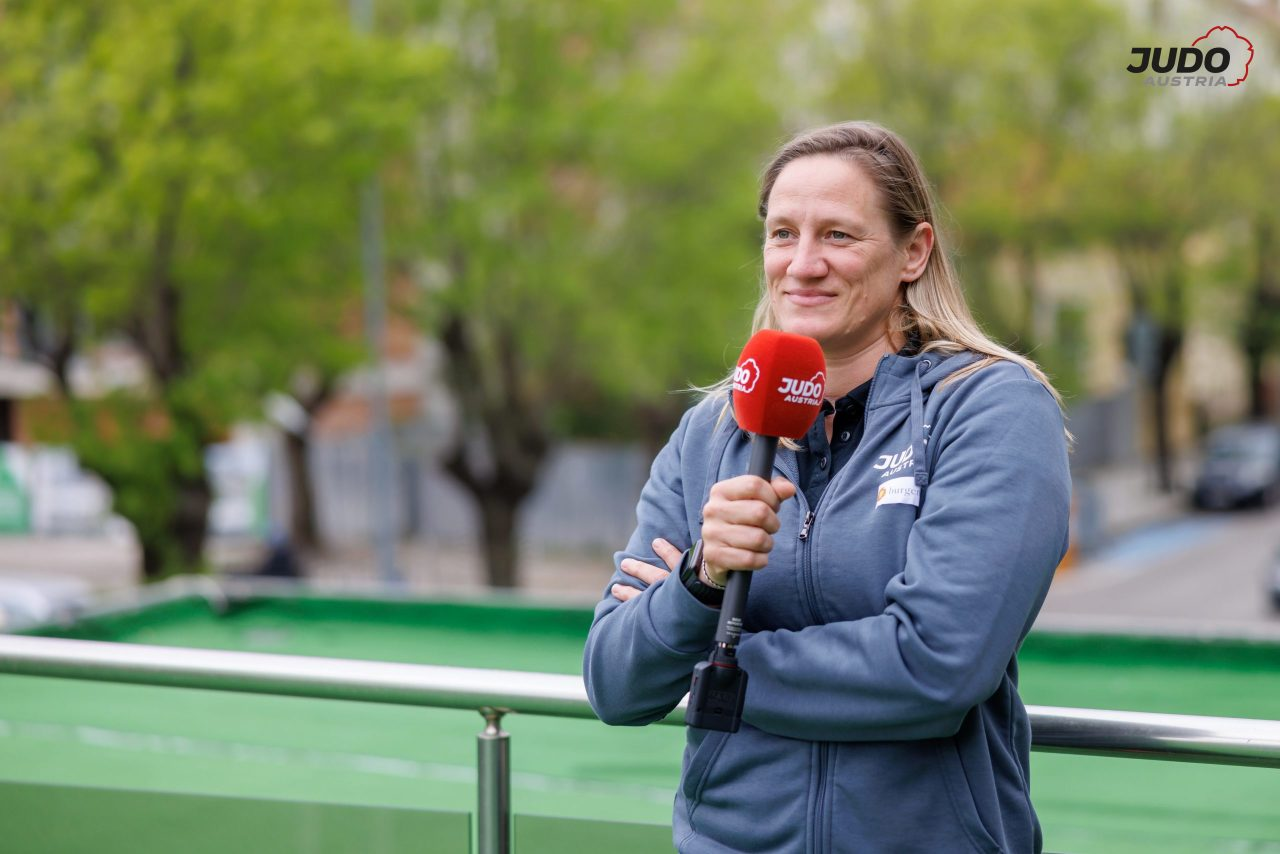

Personal information
- Born: 29 December 1980 (age 45) Ludwigsfelde, East Germany
- Education: FH für Sport und Management Potsdam
- Occupation: Judo coach
- Employer: Judo Austria

Sport
- Country: Germany
- Sport: Judo
- Weight class: –57 kg
- Rank: 7th dan black belt
- Retired: 2009
- Now coaching: Michaela Polleres; Shamil Borchashvili

Achievements and titles
- Olympic Games: (gold) (2004)
- World Champ.: (silver) (2003, 2005)
- European Champ.: (silver) (2002, 2007)
Medal record
Women's judo
Representing Germany
Olympic Games
Gold medal – first place	2004 Athens	‍–‍57 kg
World Championships
Silver medal – second place	2003 Osaka	‍–‍57 kg
Silver medal – second place	2005 Cairo	‍–‍57 kg
European Championships
Silver medal – second place	2002 Maribor	‍–‍57 kg
Silver medal – second place	2007 Belgrade	‍–‍57 kg

Profile at external databases
- IJF: 695
- JudoInside.com: 214
- Updated on 31 May 2023

Yvonne Snir-Bönisch (née Bönisch; born 29 December 1980 in Ludwigsfelde, East Germany) is a German judo coach and former judoka.

== Judo career ==
Her beginnings with judo happened at JV Ludwigsfelde. She won a gold medal in the lightweight division (57 kg) at the 2004 Summer Olympics and was a two-times world championship finalist (2003 and 2005). She retired in 2008.

Bönisch coached at UJKC Potsdam. She moved to Israel in January 2017 and was a coach with the women's national team until end of 2020. Since 1.1.2021 she is the head coach of the Austrian Judo national team and responsible for men and women. At the Tokyo Olympics her athletes won 2 medals. Silver for Michaela Polleres (‍–‍70 kg) and Bronze for Shamil Borchashvili (‍–‍81 kg). At the Paris Olympics her athlete, Michaela Polleres (‍–‍70 kg) won Bronze.

For her success at the 2024 Olympic Games, she was awarded the seventh Dan by Judo Austria.

== Private life ==
Yvonne Snir-Bönisch is married to an Israeli woman.
