= Cinzia Cavazzuti =

Italian Olympic judoka

Personal information
- Born: 12 September 1973 (age 53)
- Occupation: Judoka

Sport
- Country: Italy
- Sport: Judo
- Weight class: ‍–‍57 kg

Achievements and titles
- Olympic Games: 5th (2000)
- World Champ.: 5th (2001)
- European Champ.: (gold) (2002)
Medal record
Women's judo
Representing Italy
European Championships
Gold medal – first place	2002 Maribor	‍–‍57 kg
Bronze medal – third place	1999 Bratislava	‍–‍57 kg
Bronze medal – third place	2001 Paris	‍–‍57 kg
Bronze medal – third place	2004 Bucharest	‍–‍57 kg

Profile at external databases
- IJF: 36426
- JudoInside.com: 429
- Updated on 19 November 2022

Cinzia Cavazzuti (born 12 September 1973) is an Italian former judoka who competed in the 2000 Summer Olympics and in the 2004 Summer Olympics.
