= Ursula Myrén =

Swedish judoka

Personal information
- Nationality: Swedish
- Born: 30 January 1966 (age 60) Stockholm, Sweden

Sport
- Sport: Judo

Ursula Myrén (born 30 January 1966) is a Swedish judoka. She competed at the 1992 Summer Olympics and the 1996 Summer Olympics.
