= Filipa Cavalleri =

Portuguese judoka

Personal information
- Nationality: Portuguese
- Born: 6 December 1973 (age 52) Lisbon, Portugal
- Occupation: Judoka

Sport
- Sport: Judo
Medal record
Women's judo
Representing Portugal
World Championships
Bronze medal – third place	1995 Chiba	–56 kg

Profile at external databases
- JudoInside.com: 3239

Filipa Cavalleri (born 6 December 1973) is a Portuguese judoka. She competed at the 1992, 1996 and the 2000 Summer Olympics. She is a pioneer in Portuguese judo.

== Ancestry ==
Third of seven sons and daughters of Jorge Penaguião Celestino Soares Cavalleri ( Lisbon, Socorro, 7 July 1944), great-great-nephew of the 1st Viscount of Leceia, great-great-nephew and great-great-grandson of the 5th Marquês de los Soidos Grande of Spain 1st Class, 7th grandson of the 5th Count of Arcos, 8th grandson of the 2nd Count of Santiago de Beduído, nephew-5th grandson of the 1st Count of Belmonte, nephew-5 .th grandson of the 3rd Viscount of Mesquitela by interest and estate and 1st Count of Mesquitela, of the Viscount of Cunha and Marquês da Cunha in Brazil and of the 1stCount of Madeira Island, son and at least 5th grandson of Italians, and his wife Nelly Castelo-Branco Lopes.
