= Barbara Harel =

French Olympic judoka

Personal information
- Born: 5 May 1977 (age 49)
- Occupation: Judoka

Sport
- Country: France
- Sport: Judo
- Weight class: –57 kg

Achievements and titles
- Olympic Games: 5th (2004, 2008)
- World Champ.: 5th (2003)
- European Champ.: (gold) (2000, 2006)
Medal record
Women's judo
Representing France
European Championships
Gold medal – first place	2000 Wrocław	–57 kg
Gold medal – first place	2006 Tampere	–57 kg
Bronze medal – third place	2001 Paris	–57 kg
Bronze medal – third place	2008 Lisbon	–57 kg
IJF Grand Slam
Bronze medal – third place	2009 Paris	–57 kg
IJF Grand Prix
Gold medal – first place	2009 Abu Dhabi	–57 kg
European Junior Championships
Gold medal – first place	1995 Valladolid	–56 kg
Mediterranean Games
Silver medal – second place	2009 Pescara	–57 kg

Profile at external databases
- IJF: 1739
- JudoInside.com: 361
- Updated on 16 November 2022

Barbara Harel (born 5 May 1977 in Nantes) is a French judoka who competed in the 2000 Summer Olympics, in the 2004 Summer Olympics, and in the 2008 Summer Olympics.
