= Isabel Fernández (judoka) =

Spanish judoka (born 1972)

Personal information
- Born: 1 February 1972 (age 54) Torrellano, Spain
- Occupation: Judoka

Sport
- Country: Spain
- Sport: Judo
- Weight class: –56 kg, –57 kg

Achievements and titles
- Olympic Games: (gold) (2000)
- World Champ.: (1997)
- European Champ.: (gold) (1998, 1999, 2001, 2003, 2004, 2007)
Medal record
Women's judo
Representing Spain
Olympic Games
Gold medal – first place	2000 Sydney	‍–‍57 kg
Bronze medal – third place	1996 Atlanta	‍–‍56 kg
World Championships
Gold medal – first place	1997 Paris	‍–‍56 kg
Silver medal – second place	1999 Birmingham	‍–‍57 kg
Silver medal – second place	2007 Rio de Janeiro	‍–‍57 kg
Bronze medal – third place	2001 Munich	‍–‍57 kg
European Championships
Gold medal – first place	1998 Oviedo	‍–‍57 kg
Gold medal – first place	1999 Bratislava	‍–‍57 kg
Gold medal – first place	2001 Paris	‍–‍57 kg
Gold medal – first place	2003 Düsseldorf	‍–‍57 kg
Gold medal – first place	2004 Bucharest	‍–‍57 kg
Gold medal – first place	2007 Belgrade	‍–‍57 kg
Silver medal – second place	1995 Birmingham	‍–‍56 kg
Silver medal – second place	1997 Oostende	‍–‍56 kg
Silver medal – second place	2008 Lisbon	‍–‍57 kg
Bronze medal – third place	1996 The Hague	‍–‍56 kg
Bronze medal – third place	2002 Maribor	‍–‍57 kg
Bronze medal – third place	2005 Rotterdam	‍–‍57 kg
Bronze medal – third place	2006 Tampere	‍–‍57 kg
European Junior Championships
Bronze medal – third place	1988 Vienna	‍–‍56 kg

Profile at external databases
- IJF: 3328
- JudoInside.com: 622
- Updated on 1 June 2023

María Isabel Fernández Gutiérrez (born 1 February 1972) is a Spanish judoka. She is an Olympic champion, a world champion and six-time European champion. She won the gold medal in the lightweight (57 kg) division at the 2000 Summer Olympics in Sydney, and received an Olympic bronze medal in 1996.

Awards
Preceded by Niurka Montalvo	Spanish Sportswoman of the Year; 2000	Succeeded by Sheila Herrero

Olympic Games
Preceded by Manuel Estiarte	Flagbearer for Spain; Athens 2004	Succeeded by David Cal
