= Maria Pekli =

Australian judoka

Personal information
- Born: 12 June 1972 (age 54) Baja, Hungary
- Occupation: Judoka

Sport
- Country: Hungary, Australia
- Sport: Judo
- Weight class: –57 kg
- Rank: 5th dan black belt

Achievements and titles
- Olympic Games: (bronze) (2000)
- World Champ.: 5th (1993, 2003)
- Regional finals: (silver) (1996); (gold) (2000, 2002, 2003, 2004, 2008)
- Commonwealth Games: (gold) (2002)
Medal record
Women's judo
Representing Australia
Olympic Games
Bronze medal – third place	2000 Sydney	‍–‍57 kg
Oceania Championships
Gold medal – first place	2000 Sydney	‍–‍57 kg
Gold medal – first place	2002 Wellington	‍–‍57 kg
Gold medal – first place	2003 Suva	‍–‍57 kg
Gold medal – first place	2004 Nouméa	‍–‍57 kg
Gold medal – first place	2008 Christchurch	‍–‍57 kg
Commonwealth Games
Gold medal – first place	2002 Manchester	‍–‍57 kg
Representing Hungary
European Championships
Silver medal – second place	1996 The Hague	‍–‍56 kg
European Junior Championships
Silver medal – second place	1989 Athens	‍–‍52 kg

Profile at external databases
- IJF: 15909
- JudoInside.com: 2710
- Updated on 1 June 2023

Maria Pekli (born 12 June 1972 in Baja, Hungary) is an Australian judoka of Hungarian descent. She was Australian Champion in the ‍–‍57 kg division for seven consecutive years, between 1997 and 2003.

She won a bronze medal in the lightweight (57 kg) division at the 2000 Summer Olympics, the first Australian woman to win an official Olympic Judo medal (although Suzanne Williams won a medal at the 1988 Summer Olympics when Women's Judo was a demonstration sport).

Along with Cuba's Driulys González and Japan's Ryoko Tamura-Tani, Pekli became in 2008 the first female judoka to compete at five Olympics. The only other judokas to compete at five Olympics are Belgian Robert Van de Walle and Puerto Rican judoka-bobsledder Jorge Bonnet.

In 2011, Pekli was awarded Life Membership of Judo Australia for her contribution to the sport at the Australian National Judo Championships.

In 2015, Pekli was inducted into the International Judo Hall of Fame at a ceremony in Astana, Kazakhstan.

== Achievements ==
Year	Competition	Venue	Position	Notes
2008	Olympic Games	Beijing, China	5th	Lightweight (57 kg)
2003	World Judo Championships	Osaka, Japan	5th	Lightweight (57 kg)
2002	Commonwealth Games	Manchester, England	1st	Lightweight (57 kg)
2000	Olympic Games	Sydney	3rd	Lightweight (57 kg)
1996	European Judo Championships	The Hague, Netherlands	2nd	Lightweight (56 kg)
1995	European Judo Championships	Birmingham, England	7th	Lightweight (56 kg)
1993	World Judo Championships	Hamilton, Ontario, Canada	5th	Lightweight (56 kg)
