= Belgium at the 2000 Summer Olympics =

- IOC code: BEL
- NOC: Belgian Olympic and Interfederal Committee
- Website: www.teambelgium.be (in Dutch and French)

in Sydney
- Competitors: 68 (36 men, 32 women) in 16 sports
- Flag bearer: Ulla Werbrouck
- Medals Ranked 55th: Gold 0 Silver 2 Bronze 3 Total 5

Summer Olympics appearances (overview)
- 1900; 1904; 1908; 1912; 1920; 1924; 1928; 1932; 1936; 1948; 1952; 1956; 1960; 1964; 1968; 1972; 1976; 1980; 1984; 1988; 1992; 1996; 2000; 2004; 2008; 2012; 2016; 2020; 2024; 2028

Other related appearances
- 1906 Intercalated Games

Belgium competed at the 2000 Summer Olympics in Sydney, Australia.

== Medalists ==
Medal	Name	Sport	Event	Date
Silver	Filip Meirhaeghe	Cycling	Men's Cross-country	24 September
Silver	Etienne De Wilde; Matthew Gilmore	Cycling	Men's Madison	22 September
Bronze	Ann Simons	Judo	Women's −48kg	16 September
Bronze	Gella Vandecaveye	Judo	Women's −63kg	19 September
Bronze	Els Callens; Dominique Van Roost	Tennis	Women's Doubles	28 September

== Archery ==
Athlete	Event	Ranking round		Round of 64	Round of 32	Round of 16	Quarterfinal	Semifinal	Final / BM	
Athlete	Event	Score	Seed	Opposition Result	Opposition Result	Opposition Result	Opposition Result	Opposition Result	Opposition Result	Rank
Nico Hendrickx	Men's Individual	640	10	Jubzang (BHU); W 162–156	Shikarev (KAZ); L 141–154	Did not advance				

== Athletics ==
Key

- Note–Ranks given for track events are within the athlete's heat only
- Q = Qualified for the next round by position in race or, in field events, by achieving the automatic qualification target
- q = Qualified for the next round as a fastest loser or, in field events, by position without achieving the qualifying target

Men
Track and road events

Athlete	Event	Heat		Quarterfinal		Semifinal		Final	
Athlete	Event	Time	Rank	Time	Rank	Time	Rank	Time	Rank
Nathan Kahan	800 m	1:47.69	6	—N/a		Did not advance			
Mohammed Mourhit	5000 m	Did not start		—N/a				Did not advance	
Mohammed Mourhit	10.000 m	27:45.73	4 Q	—N/a				Did not finish	
Jonathan Nsenga	110 m hurdles	13.57	3 Q	13.73	6	Did not advance			

Track and road events

Athlete	Event	Qualification		Final	
Athlete	Event	Result	Rank	Result	Rank
Erik Nijs	Long jump	7.52	37	Did not advance	
Thibaut Duval	Pole vault	5.55	=22	Did not advance	
Erik Nijs	Discus throw	60.93	22	Did not advance	

Women
Track and road events

Athlete	Event	Heat		Quarterfinal		Semifinal		Final	
Athlete	Event	Time	Rank	Time	Rank	Time	Rank	Time	Rank
Sandra Stals	800 m	2:02.33	4	—N/a		Did not advance			
Veerle Dejaeghere	1500 m	4:10.68	4	—N/a		4:07.87	6	Did not advance	
Veerle Dejaeghere	10.000 m	Did not start		—N/a				Did not advance	
Veerle Dejaeghere	Marathon	—N/a						Did not finish	

== Badminton ==
Athlete	Event	Round of 64	Round of 32	Round of 16	Round of 16	Quarter-finals	Semi-finals	Final
Athlete	Event	Opposition Score	Opposition Score	Opposition Score	Opposition Score	Opposition Score	Opposition Score	Opposition Score
Ruud Kuijten	Men's Singles	Bye	Jonassen (DEN); L 2–0 (15–8, 15–5)	Did not advance				

== Canoeing ==
Athlete	Event	Heat		Semifinal		Final	
Athlete	Event	Time	Rank	Time	Rank	Time	Rank
Bob Maesen	Men's K-1 1000 m	3:37.587	3 Q	3:43.147	5	Did not advance	

== Cycling ==
=== Mountain Biking ===
Athlete	Event	Time	Rank
Filip Meirhaeghe	Men's cross-country	2:10:05.51	2nd place, silver medalist(s)
Roel Paulissen	Men's cross-country	2:16:54.82	19
Peter van den Abeele	Men's cross-country	Did not finish	

=== Road ===
Athlete	Event	Time	Rank
Axel Merckx	Men's road race	5:30:37	12
Nico Mattan	Men's road race	5:30:46	33
Marc Wauters	Men's road race	5:30:46	67
Rik Verbrugghe	Men's road race	5:30:46	71
Peter Van Petegem	Men's road race	5:36:14	79
Heidi van de Vijver	Women's road race	3:06:31	8
Cindy Pieters	Women's road race	3:06:31	20
Vanja Vonckx	Women's road race	3:12:40	40

=== Track ===
Athlete	Event	Points	Rank
Matthew Gilmore	Men's points race	6	15
Etienne de Wilde; Matthew Gilmore	Men's madison	22	2nd place, silver medalist(s)

== Equestrian ==
Eventing

Athlete	Horse	Event	Dressage		Cross-country		Show jumping		Total	
Athlete	Horse	Event	Penalties	Rank	Penalties	Rank	Penalties	Rank	Penalties	Rank
Bruno Goyens de Heusch	Graceland Cava	Individual	53.2	26	Did not finish					
Carl Bouckaert; Karin Donckers; Kurt Heyndrickx; Constantin Van Rijckevorsel	Urbane Des Pins; Gormley; Archimedes; Withcote Nellie	Team	160.4	7	1297.0	10	121.2	9	2121.2	9

Jumping

Athlete	Horse	Event	Qualification								Final				Total	
Athlete	Horse	Event	Round 1		Round 2			Round 3			Round A		Round B		Total	
Athlete	Horse	Event	Penalties	Rank	Penalties	Total	Rank	Penalties	Total	Rank	Penalties	Rank	Penalties	Rank	Penalties	Rank
Ludo Philippaerts	Otterongo	Individual	16.00	=49	8.00	24.00	45	8.00	32.00	42 Q	4.00	=3	4.00	=3	8.00	=4

== Gymnastics ==
Artistic

- Sigrid Persoon
  1. Women's Individual All-Around – 43rd place
  2. Horse Vault – 18th place
  3. Floor Exercise – 54th place
  4. Uneven Bars – 64th place
  5. Balance Beam – 68th place

== Judo ==
Men

Athlete	Event	Preliminary Round	Round of 32	Round of 16	Quarterfinals	Semifinals	Repechage 1	Repechage 2	Repechage 3	Final / BM	
Athlete	Event	Opposition score	Opposition score	Opposition score	Opposition score	Opposition score	Opposition score	Opposition score	Opposition score	Opposition score	Rank
Cédric Taymans	-60 kg	Mirzaliyev (UKR); W 0112-0010	Greczkowski (USA); L 0000-1000	Did not advance							
Harry Van Barneveld	+100 kg	Bye	Ko (KOR); W 1100-0001	Tangriev (UZB); W 10210-0021	Douillet (FRA); L 1021-0021	Did not advance	Bye	Tataroğlu (TUR); L 0010-1010	Did not advance		

Women

Athlete	Event	Round of 32	Round of 16	Quarterfinals	Semifinals	Repechage 1	Repechage 2	Repechage 3	Final / BM	
Athlete	Event	Opposition score	Opposition score	Opposition score	Opposition score	Opposition score	Opposition score	Opposition score	Opposition score	Rank
Ann Simons	-48 kg	Rouini (TUN); W	Hill (AUS); W	Gradante (GER); L	Did not advance	Bye	Martins (BRA); W	Savon (CUB); W	Cha (PRK); W	3rd place, bronze medalist(s)
Inge Clement	-52 kg	Souakri (ALG); L	Did not advance							
Marisabel Lomba	-57 kg	Kouahoe (CIV); W	Bar-On (ISR); W	González (CUB); L	Did not advance	Bye	Harel (FRA); L	Did not advance		
Gella Vandecaveye	-63 kg	Bye	Ji (PRK); W	Li (CHN); L	Did not advance	Bye	Artamonova (KGZ); W	Ishii (BRA); W	von Rekowski (GER); W	3rd place, bronze medalist(s)
Ulla Werbrouck	-70 kg	Bye	Martín (ESP); L	Did not advance		Pazoutova (CZE); W	Ueno (JPN); W	Bosch (NED); W	Cho (KOR); L	5
Heidi Rakels	-78 kg	Keinhuis (NED); W	Monney (CIV); W	Pierantozzi (ITA); W	Tang (CIV); L	Bye			Richter (ROU); L	5
Brigitte Olivier	+78 kg	Martin (ESP); W	Kovacevic (YUG); W	Beltrán (CUB); L	Did not advance	Bye	Kim (KOR); L	Did not advance		

== Rowing ==
Athlete	Event	Heat		Repechage		Semifinal		Final	
Athlete	Event	Time	Rank	Time	Rank	Time	Rank	Time	Rank
Arnaud Duchesne; Luc Goiris; Björn Hendrickx; Stijn Smulders	Quadruple sculls	5:56.79	4 R	6:10.11	3	5:56.36	5 FB	5:54.17	9

== Sailing ==
Two men and two women competed in the Sailing competition in four different events.

Men

Athlete	Event	Race											Net points	Rank
Athlete	Event	1	2	3	4	5	6	7	8	9	10	11	Net points	Rank
Sebastien Godefroid	Finn	13	3	10	1	14	~~17~~	5	10	7	~~19~~	2	65	7
Philippe Bergmans	Laser	13	4	24	23	9	19	~~25~~	17	~~30~~	6	1	116	16

Women

Athlete	Event	Race											Net points	Rank
Athlete	Event	1	2	3	4	5	6	7	8	9	10	11	Net points	Rank
Sigrid Rondelez	Mistral	~~21~~	13	11	19	11	16	17	~~26~~	12	9	19	127	16
Min Dezillie	Europe	8	8	~~26~~	10	4	4	10	~~12~~	10	7	7	68	6

== Shooting ==
Women

Athlete	Event	Qualification		Final		Total	
Athlete	Event	Points	Rank	Points	Rank	Points	Rank
Anne Focan	Women's Trap	67	3 Q	21	4	88	4
Anne Focan	Women's Double trap	99	7	Did not advance			

== Swimming ==
Men

Athlete	Event	Heat		Semifinal		Final	
Athlete	Event	Time	Rank	Time	Rank	Time	Rank
Thierry Wouters	50 m freestyle	23.44	39	Did not advance			
Thierry Wouters	100 m freestyle	51.07	32	Did not advance			

Women

Athlete	Event	Heat		Semifinal		Final	
Athlete	Event	Time	Rank	Time	Rank	Time	Rank
Liesbet Dreesen	50 m freestyle	26.21	28	Did not advance			
Tine Bossuyt	100 m freestyle	58.02	35	Did not advance			
Nina van Koeckhoven	200 m freestyle	2:02.15	22	Did not advance			
Sofie Goffin	400 m freestyle	4:15.93	20	—N/a		Did not advance	
Fabienne Dufour	100 m butterfly	1:01.15	23	Did not advance			
Brigitte Becue	100 m breaststroke	1:09.38	9 Q	1:09.47	5	Did not advance	
Brigitte Becue	200 m breaststroke	2:31.27	21	Did not advance			
Sofie Wolfs	100 m backstroke	1:04.66	27	Did not advance			
Yseult Gervy	200 m backstroke	2:16.67	22	Did not advance			
Yseult Gervy	200 m individual medley	2:16.51	12 Q	2:17.19	7	Did not advance	
Yseult Gervy	400 m individual medley	4:48.31	18	—N/a		Did not advance	
Tine Bossuyt; Liesbet Dreesen; Sofie Goffin; Nina Van Koeckhoven	4 x 100 m freestyle relay	3:46.91	11	—N/a		Did not advance	
Fabienne Dufour; Yseult Gervy; Sofie Goffin; Nina Van Koeckhoven	4 x 200 m freestyle relay	8:12.37	12	—N/a		Did not advance	
Brigitte Becue; Fabienne Dufour; Nina van Koeckhoven; Sofie Wolfs	4 x 100 m medley relay	4:10.98	11	—N/a		Did not advance	

== Table Tennis ==
Men

Athlete	Event	Groupstage			First Round	Second Round	Quarter-finals	Semi-finals	Final
Athlete	Event	Opposition Score	Opposition Score	Rank	Opposition Score	Opposition Score	Opposition Score	Opposition Score	Opposition Score
Jean-Michel Saive	Singles	Bye			Korbel (CZE); W 3–0	Waldner (SWE); L 3–1	Did not advance		
Philippe Saive	Singles	Marengo (CHI); W 3–0	Shchetinin (BLR); W 3–1	1 Q	L Guozheng (CHN); L 3–2	Did not advance			
Jean-Michel Saive; Philippe Saive	Doubles	Iseki / Tasaki (JPN); L 0–2	Gambra / Tasaki (CHI); W 2–0	2	Did not advance				

== Tennis ==
Women

Athlete	Event	Round 1	Round 2	Round 3	Quarter-finals	Semi-finals	Bronze Medal Match	Rank
Athlete	Event	Opposition Score	Opposition Score	Opposition Score	Opposition Score	Opposition Score	Opposition Score	Rank
Sabine Appelmans	Singles	Jeyaseelan (CAN); W 7–5, 6–2	Vento (VEN); W 6–2, 6–2	Coetzer (RSA); L 6–3, 6–1	Did not advance			
Els Callens	Singles	Asagoe (JPN); W 6–0, 6–4	Zuluaga (COL); L 6–3, 6–2	Did not advance				
Dominique Van Roost	Singles	Gerši (CZE); W 6–1, 6–1	Myskina (RUS); W 6–2, 6–3	Farina Elia (ITA); W 6–1, 7–5	Seles (USA); L 6–0, 6–2	Did not advance		
Els Callens; Dominique Van Roost	Doubles	Majoli & Talaja (CRO); W 6–2, 5–7, 6–2	Habšudová & Husárová (SVK); W 6–3, 6–2	—N/a	Sequera & Vento (VEN); W 4–6, 7–5, 6–4	Williams & Williams (USA); L 6–4, 6–1	Barabanschikova & Zvereva (BLR); W 4–6, 6–4, 6–1	3rd place, bronze medalist(s)

== Triathlon ==
At the inaugural Olympic triathlon competition, Belgium was represented by two women. One finished, placing sixteenth, while the other withdrew during the second phase.

Athlete	Event	Swim	Trans. 1	Cycle	Trans. 2	Run	Total	Rank
Kathleen Smet	Women's	20:16.68	0:38.00	1:06:14.70	0:24.20	36:32.40	2:04:05	16
Mieke Suys	Women's	20:17.98	0:28.10	Did not finish				

== Weightlifting ==
Athlete	Event	Snatch			Clean & Jerk			Total	Rank
Athlete	Event	1	2	3	1	2	3	Total	Rank
François Demeure	Men's 69 kg	~~140.0~~	145.0	~~145.0~~	170.0	~~175.0~~	~~175.0~~	310.0	12
Ingeborg Marx	Women's 58 kg	72.5	77.5	~~82.5~~	~~100.0~~	100.0	105.0	~~177.5~~	11
