= Judo at the 2000 Summer Olympics – Women's 52 kg =

Women's 52 kg at the Games of the XXVII Olympiad
- Venue: Sydney Convention and Exhibition Centre
- Date: 17 September 2000
- Competitors: 24 from 24 nations

Medalists
1st place, gold medalist(s)		Legna Verdecia	Cuba
2nd place, silver medalist(s)		Noriko Narazaki	Japan
3rd place, bronze medalist(s)		Kye Sun-hui	North Korea
3rd place, bronze medalist(s)		Liu Yuxiang	China

These are the results of the women's 52 kg (also known as half-lightweight) competition in judo at the 2000 Summer Olympics in Sydney. A total of 24 women qualified for this event, limited to jūdōka whose body weight was less than, or equal to, 52 kilograms. Competition took place in the Sydney Convention and Exhibition Centre on 17 September.

== Competitors ==
Athlete	Nation
Ulrike Kaiser	Liechtenstein
Lourembam Brojeshori Devi	India
Arijana Jaha	Bosnia and Herzegovina
Jackelin Díaz	Venezuela
Ioana Maria Aluaş	Romania
Liu Yuxiang	China
Salima Souakri	Algeria
Inge Clement	Belgium
Isabelle Schmutz	Switzerland
Jang Jae-Sim	South Korea
Noriko Narazaki	Japan
Luce Baillargeon	Canada
Kye Sun-Hui	North Korea
Hillary Wolf	United States
Deborah Gravenstijn	Netherlands
Judith Aline Esseng Abollo	Cameroon
Laetitia Tignola	France
Rebecca Sullivan	Australia
Legna Verdecia	Cuba
Miren León	Spain
Deborah Allen	Great Britain
Naina Ravaoarisoa	Madagascar
Shih Pei-Chun	Chinese Taipei
Carolina Mariani	Argentina

== Main Bracket ==
The gold and silver medalists were determined by the final match of the main single-elimination bracket.

Round of 32
Lourembam Brojeshori Devi (IND)	W
Arijana Jaha (BIH)	L
Jackelin Díaz (VEN)	L
Ioana Maria Aluaş (ROU)	W
Salima Souakri (ALG)	W
Inge Clement (BEL)	L
Noriko Narazaki (JPN)	W
Luce Baillargeon (CAN)	L
Kye Sun-Hui (PRK)	W
Hillary Wolf (USA)	L
Judith Esseng Abolo (CMR)	L
Laetitia Tignola (FRA)	W
Miren León (ESP)	W
Deborah Allan (GBR)	L
Naina Ravaoarisoa (MAD)	L
Shih Pei-Chun (TPE)	W

Round of 16
Ulrike Kaiser (LIE)	L
Lourembam Brojeshori Devi (IND)	W
Ioana Maria Aluaş (ROU)	L
Liu Yuxiang (CHN)	W
Salima Souakri (ALG)	W
Isabelle Schmutz (SUI)	L
Jang Jae-Sim (KOR)	L
Noriko Narazaki (JPN)	W
Kye Sun-Hui (PRK)	W
Deborah Gravenstijn (NED)	L
Laetitia Tignola (FRA)	L
Rebecca Sullivan (AUS)	W
Legna Verdecia (CUB)	W
Miren León (ESP)	L
Shih Pei-Chun (TPE)	L
Carolina Mariani (ARG)	W

Quarterfinals
Lourembam Brojeshori Devi (IND)	L
Liu Yuxiang (CHN)	W
Salima Souakri (ALG)	L
Noriko Narazaki (JPN)	W
Kye Sun-Hui (PRK)	W
Rebecca Sullivan (AUS)	L
Legna Verdecia (CUB)	W
Carolina Mariani (ARG)	L

Semifinals
Liu Yuxiang (CHN)	L
Noriko Narazaki (JPN)	W
Kye Sun-Hui (PRK)	L
Legna Verdecia (CUB)	W

Gold medal final
Noriko Narazaki (JPN)	L
Legna Verdecia (CUB)	W

=== Repechage ===
The losing semifinalists as well as those judoka eliminated in earlier rounds by the four semifinalists of the main bracket advanced to the repechage. These matches determined the two bronze medalists for the event.

First round
Dinea (ROU)	W
Bye	L
Baillargeon (CAN)	W
Jang (KOR)	L
Wolf (USA)	L
Gravenstijn (NED)	W
León (ESP)	W
Bye	L

Second round
Dinea (ROU)	W
Devi (IND)	L
Baillargeon (CAN)	L
Souakri (ALG)	W
Gravenstijn (NED)	W
Sullivan (AUS)	L
León (ESP)	W
Mariani (ARG)	L

Third round
Dinea (ROU)	W
Souakri (ALG)	L
Gravenstijn (NED)	W
León (ESP)	L

Bronze medal finals
Dinea (ROU)	L
Kye (PRK)	W
Gravenstijn (NED)	L
Liu (CHN)	W
