= India at the 2000 Summer Olympics =

- IOC code: IND
- NOC: Indian Olympic Association
- Website: olympic.ind.in

in Sydney
- Competitors: 65 in 13 sports
- Flag bearer: Leander Paes
- Medals Ranked 71st: Gold 0 Silver 0 Bronze 1 Total 1

Summer Olympics appearances (overview)
- 1900; 1904–1912; 1920; 1924; 1928; 1932; 1936; 1948; 1952; 1956; 1960; 1964; 1968; 1972; 1976; 1980; 1984; 1988; 1992; 1996; 2000; 2004; 2008; 2012; 2016; 2020; 2024

India competed at the 2000 Summer Olympics in Sydney, Australia.

== Medalists ==
Medal	Name	Sport	Events	Date
Bronze	Karnam Malleswari	Weightlifting	Women's 69 kg	19 Sep

== Competitors ==
Sports	Men	Women	Total	Events
Athletics	12	12	24	12
Badminton	1	1	2	2
Boxing	4	0	4	4
Equestrian	1	0	1	1
Field hockey	16	0	16	1
Judo	0	1	1	1
Rowing	2	0	2	1
Shooting	2	1	3	3
Swimming	1	1	2	2
Table tennis	1	1	2	2
Tennis	2	2	4	3
Weightlifting	1	2	3	3
Wrestling	1	0	1	1
Total	44	21	65	36

== Athletics ==
Key

- Note–Ranks given for track events are within the athlete's heat only
- Q = Qualified for the next round
- q = Qualified for the next round as a fastest loser or, in field events, by position without achieving the qualifying target
- NR = National record
- SB = Seasonal best
- N/A = Round not applicable for the event
- Bye = Athlete not required to compete in round

=== Track & road events ===
==== Men ====
Athlete	Event	Heats		Quarter Finals		Semi Finals		Final	
Athlete	Event	Result	Rank	Result	Rank	Result	Rank	Result	Rank
Paramjit Singh	Men's 400m	46.64	6	Did Not Advance					
Rajeev Bala Krishnan C. Thirugnana Durai Anil Kumar Prakash Anand Menezes	Men's 4 × 100 m	40.23	7	N/A		Did Not Advance			
Lijo David Thottan Purukottam Ramachandran Jata Shankar Paramjit Singh	Men's 4 × 400 m	3:08.38	4	N/A		Did Not Advance			

==== Women ====
Athlete	Event	Heats		QuarterFinals		SemiFinals		Final	
Athlete	Event	Result	Rank	Result	Rank	Result	Rank	Result	Rank
Beena Mol K. M.	Women's 400 m	51.51	1 Q	51.81	4 Q	52.04	8	Did Not Advance	
Saraswati Dey Rachita Mistry Vinita Tripathi Valdivel Jayalakshmi	Women's 4 × 100 m	45.20	6	N/A		Did Not Advance			
Paramjeet Kaur Jincy Phillip K.M.Beena Mol Rosa Kutty	Women's 4 × 400 m	3:31.46	6	N/A		Did Not Advance			

=== Field Events ===
==== Men ====
Athlete	Events	Qualification		Final	
Athlete	Events	Distance	Result	Distance	Result
Bahadur Singh Sagoo	Men's Shot Put	18.70	27	Did Not Advance	
Shakti Singh	Men's Shot Put	18.40	32	Did Not Advance	
Jagdish Bishnoi	Men's Javelin Throw	70.86	30	Did Not Advance	
Rai Sanjay Khumar	Men's Long Jump	NM	-	Did Not Advance	

==== Women ====
Athlete	Event	Qualification		Final	
Athlete	Event	Distance	Result	Distance	Result
Neelam Jaswant Singh	Women's Discus Throw	55.26	26	did not advance	
Gurmeet Kaur	Women's Javelin Throw	52.78	32	Did Not Advance	

=== Combined – Women's heptathlon ===
Athlete	Event	100 metres Hurdles	High Jump	Shot Put	200 metres	Long Jump	Javelin Throw	800 metres	Total Points	Rank
Pramila Ganapathy	Results	14.22	1.69	11.14	24.69	5.96	36.02	02:20.86	5548	24
Pramila Ganapathy	Points	947	842	604	915	837	591	812	5548	24
Soma Biswas	Results	14.11	1.63	11.69	24.73	5.64	39.59	02:22.17	5481	25
Soma Biswas	Points	963	771	641	912	741	659	794	5481	25

== Badminton ==
Athlete	Event	Round of 64	Round of 32	Round of 16	Quarter Finals	Semi Finals	Final	
Athlete	Event	Opposition Result	Opposition Result	Opposition Result	Opposition Result	Opposition Result	Opposition Result	Rank
Pullela Gopichand	Men's singles	Bye	Vladislav Druzchenko (UKR) W 15–3, 10–15, 15–7	Hendrawan (INA) L 9–15, 4–15	Did not advance			
Aparna Popat	Women's singles	Kelly Morgan (GBR) L 11–5, 7–11, 2–11	Did not advance					

== Boxing ==
Athlete	Event	Round of 32	Round of 16	Quarter Finals	Semi Finals	Final	
Athlete	Event	Opposition Result	Opposition Result	Opposition Result	Opposition Result	Opposition Result	Rank
Soubam Suresh Singh	Men's Light Flyweight (48kg)	Kim Ki-Suk (KOR) L 5-9		Did Not Advance			
Dingko Singh	Men's Bantamweight (54kg)	N/A	Sergey Danilchenko (UKR) L 5-14	Did Not Advance			
Jitender Kumar	Men's Middleweight (75kg)	Donald Orr (CAN) W RSC	Adrian Diaconu (ROU) L 3-12	Did Not Advance			
Gurcharan Singh	Men's Light Heavyweight (81kg)	Choi Ki-Soo (KOR) W 11-9	Danie Venter (RSA) W RSC	Andriy Fedchuk (UKR) L 12-12^{+}	Did Not Advance		

== Equestrian ==
Athlete	Event	Horse	Dressage	Cross Country	Jumping	Total Penalty Points	Ranking
Imtiaz Anees	Individual Eventing	Spring Invader	61.0	165.2	10.0	236.2	23

== Field hockey ==
The Indian field hockey team didn't make it to the semis, and finished in seventh position after a 2–3 loss against England in the classification match.

Roster:

- Jude Menezes (gk)
- Devesh Chauhan (gk)
- Dilip Tirkey
- Dinesh Nayak
- Lazarus Barla
- Baljit Singh Saini
- Sukhbir Singh Gill
- Mohammed Riaz
- Thirumal Valavan
- Ramandeep Singh (captain)
- Mukesh Kumar
- Dhanraj Pillay
- Baljit Singh Dhillon
- Sameer Dad
- Deepak Thakur
- Gagan Ajit Singh

== Judo ==
Athlete	Event	Round 1	Round 2	QuarterFinals	SemiFinals	Final
Lourembam Brojeshori Devi	Women's 52 kg	Arijana Jaha (BIH) Won	Ulrike Kaiser (LIE) Loss	Did Not Advance		

== Rowing ==
Athlete	Event	Heats		Repachage		SemiFinals		Final	
Athlete	Event	Time	Rank	Time	Rank	Time	Rank	Time	Rank
Kasam Khan	Men's coxless pair	7:09.94	5 R	7:16.10	6	Did Not Advance			
Inderpal Singh	Men's coxless pair	7:09.94	5 R	7:16.10	6	Did Not Advance			

== Shooting ==
Athlete	Event	Qualification		Final	
Athlete	Event	Score	Rank	Score	Rank
Anwer Sultan	Men's Trap	108	26	Did Not Advance	
Abhinav Bindra	Men's 10m Air Rifle	590	11	Did Not Advance	
Anjali Vedpathak	Women's 10m Air Rifle	394	7 Q	493.1	8

== Swimming ==
Athlete	Event	Heat		Semi Finals		Final	
Athlete	Event	Time	Rank	Time	Rank	Time	Rank
Hakimuddin Shabbir Habibulla	Men's 200 m Freestyle	1:58.35	50	Did Not Advance			
Nisha Millet	Women's 200 m Freestyle	2:08:89	37	Did Not Advance			

== Table Tennis ==
Athlete	Event	Group Stage			Round of 32	Round of 16	Quarter Finals	Semi Finals	Final	
Athlete	Event	Opposition Result	Opposition Result	Rank	Opposition Result	Opposition Result	Opposition Result	Opposition Result	Opposition Result	Rank
Chetan Baboor	Men's singles	Petr Korbel (CZE) L 1-3	Peter Jackson (NZL) W 3-0	2	Did Not Advance					
Poulomi Ghatak	Women's singles	Anne Boileau (FRA) L 0-3	Veronika Pavlovich (BLR) L 0-3	3	Did Not Advance					

== Tennis ==
Athlete	Event	Round 1	Round 2	Round 3	Quarter Finals	Semi Finals	Final/BM	
Athlete	Event	Opposition Result	Opposition Result	Opposition Result	Opposition Result	Opposition Result	Opposition Result	Rank
Leander Paes	Men's singles	Mikael Tillström (SWE) L 2–6, 4–6	Did not advance					
Leander Paes Mahesh Bhupathi	Men's doubles	Pavel/ Trifu (ROU) W 6–3, 6–3	Woodforde / Woodbridge (AUS) L 3–6, 6–7	Did not advance				
Manisha Malhotra Nirupama Vaidyanathan	Women's doubles	Dokic/ Stubbs (AUS) L 0–6, 0–6	Did not advance					

== Weightlifting ==
Men

Athlete	Event	Snatch			Clean & Jerk			Total	Rank
Athlete	Event	1	2	3	1	2	3	Total	Rank
Thandava Murthy Muthu	– 56 kg	105.0	110.0	~~112.5~~	130.50	~~135.0~~	135.0	245.0	16

Women

Athlete	Event	Snatch			Clean & Jerk			Total	Rank
Athlete	Event	1	2	3	1	2	3	Total	Rank
Sanamacha Chanu	– 53 kg	80.0	85.0	~~87.5~~	105.0	110.0	~~117.5~~	195.0	6
Karnam Malleswari	– 69 kg	105.0	107.5	110.0	125.0	130.0	~~137.5~~	240.0	3rd place, bronze medalist(s)

== Wrestling ==
Athlete	Event		Group Stage			QuarterFinals	SemiFinals	Final
Athlete	Event	Opposition Result	Opposition Result	Opposition Result	Rank	Opposition Result	Opposition Result	Opposition Result
Gurbinder Singh	Men's Greco Roman -63 kg	Juan Marén (CUB) L 0-3 ^{PO}	Yassine Djakrir (ALG) W 3-0 ^{PO}	Mkhitar Manukyan (KAZ) L 1-3 ^{PP}	3	Did Not Advance		
