= Slovenia at the 2000 Summer Olympics =

- IOC code: SLO
- NOC: Olympic Committee of Slovenia
- Website: www.olympic.si (in Slovene and English)

in Sydney
- Competitors: 74 (55 men and 19 women) in 13 sports
- Flag bearer: Iztok Čop
- Medals Ranked 36th: Gold 2 Silver 0 Bronze 0 Total 2

Summer Olympics appearances (overview)
- 1992; 1996; 2000; 2004; 2008; 2012; 2016; 2020; 2024

Other related appearances
- Austria (1912); Yugoslavia (1920–1988)

Slovenia competed at the 2000 Summer Olympics in Sydney, Australia. Slovenia won their first two summer Olympic gold medals at these games.

== Medalists ==
Medal	Name	Sport	Event
Gold	Iztok Čop; Luka Špik	Rowing	Men's Double Sculls
Gold	Rajmond Debevec	Shooting	Men's 50 metre rifle three positions

== Archery ==
In Slovenia's third archery competition, the nation entered only one man, who improved his rank from four years before by one place despite losing his first match again.

Men

Athlete	Event	Ranking round		Round of 64	Round of 32	Round of 16	Quarterfinals	Semifinals	Final	
Athlete	Event	Score	Seed	Score	Score	Score	Score	Score	Score	Rank
Peter Koprivnikar	Individual	624	34	Butch Johnson (USA); L 151–164	did not advance					

== Athletics ==
Men
Track & road events

Athlete	Event	Heat		Quarterfinal		Semifinal		Final	
Athlete	Event	Result	Rank	Result	Rank	Result	Rank	Result	Rank
Roman Kejžar	Marathon	—						2:26:38	62
Matija Šestak	400 m	45.95	4	did not advance					
Urban Acman; Boštjan Fridrih; Matic Osovnikar; Matic Šušteršič	4 × 100 m relay	39.25	5 q	—		DSQ		did not advance	
Boštjan Horvat; Sergej Šalamon; Matija Šestak; Jože Vrtačič	4 × 400 m relay	3:10.07	7	did not advance					

Field events

Athlete	Event	Qualification		Final	
Athlete	Event	Distance	Position	Distance	Position
Gregor Cankar	Long jump	7.98	15	did not advance	
Primož Kozmus	Hammer throw	68.83	38	did not advance	

Women
Track & road events

Athlete	Event	Heat		Quarterfinal		Semifinal		Final	
Athlete	Event	Result	Rank	Result	Rank	Result	Rank	Result	Rank
Alenka Bikar	200 m	23.26	6 q	23.01	5	did not advance			
Helena Javornik	1500 m	4:18.18	34	did not advance					
Helena Javornik	5000 m	16:09.60	40	did not advance					
Brigita Langerholc	400 m	DNS		did not advance					
Brigita Langerholc	800 m	2:01.89	2 Q	—		1:59.09	4 q NR	1:58.51	4 NR
Meta Macus; Brigita Langerholc; Jolanda Steblovnik-Ceplak; Saša Prokofijev	4 × 400 m relay	3:35.00	7 NR	did not advance					

Field events

Athlete	Event	Qualification		Final	
Athlete	Event	Distance	Position	Distance	Position
Evfemija Štorga	Javelin throw	54.94	27	did not advance	
Anja Valant	Triple jump	14.36	4 Q	13.59	9

== Badminton ==
Athlete	Event	Round of 64	Round of 32	Round of 16	Quarterfinal	Semifinal	Final / BM
Athlete	Event	Opposition Score	Opposition Score	Opposition Score	Opposition Score	Opposition Score	Rank
Maja Pohar	Women's singles	BYE	Mann (GBR); L 4–11, 7–11	did not advance			

== Canoeing ==
=== Slalom ===
Athlete	Event	Qualifying				Final			
Athlete	Event	Run 1	Run 2	Result	Rank	Run 1	Run 2	Result	Rank
Simon Hočevar	Men's C-1	136.64	137.61	274.25	9	119.78	120.86	240.64	7
Dejan Kralj	Men's K-1	130.24	128.05	258.29	10	116.60	111.48	228.08	10
Fedja Marušič	Men's K-1	128.81	129.29	258.10	9	114.62	167.37	281.99	15
Nada Mali	Women's K-1	163.26	162.19	325.45	17	did not advance			

== Cycling ==
=== Road ===
Athlete	Event	Time	Rank
Andrej Hauptman	Road race	5:30:46	26
Martin Hvastija	Road race	DNF	
Martin Hvastija	Time trial	1:01:08.83	22
Uroš Murn	Road race	5:30:46	32
Tadej Valjavec	Road race	DNF	

=== Mountain biking ===
Athlete	Event	Time	Rank
Rok Drašler	Men's cross-country	DNF	
Primož Strančar	Men's cross-country	1 lap	37

== Gymnastics ==
=== Artistic ===
Men

Athlete	Event	Qualification								Final							
Athlete	Event	Apparatus						Total	Rank	Apparatus						Total	Rank
Athlete	Event	F	PH	R	V	PB	HB	Total	Rank	F	PH	R	V	PB	HB	Total	Rank
Mitja Petkovšek	Parallel bars	—				8.687	—	8.687	75	did not advance							

Women

Athlete	Event	Qualification						Final					
Athlete	Event	Apparatus				Total	Rank	Apparatus				Total	Rank
Athlete	Event	UB	V	HB	F	Total	Rank	UB	V	HB	F	Total	Rank
Mojca Mavric	Individual all-around	8.512	8.212	8.525	8.825	34.074	62	did not advance					

== Handball ==
=== Men's tournament ===
- Aleš Pajovič
- Andrej Kastelic
- Beno Lapajne
- Branko Bedekovič
- Gregor Cvijič
- Iztok Puc
- Jani Likavec
- Renato Vugrinec
- Roman Pungartnik
- Rolando Pušnik
- Tettey-Sowah Banfro
- Tomaž Tomšič
- Uroš Šerbec
- Zoran Jovičič
- Zoran Lubej

=== Group B ===
Team	Pld	W	D	L	GF	GA	GD	Points
Sweden	5	5	0	0	155	121	+34	10
France	5	3	1	1	120	104	+16	7
Spain	5	3	0	2	144	126	+18	6
Slovenia	5	2	1	2	137	127	+10	5
Tunisia	5	1	0	4	111	117	−6	2
Australia	5	0	0	5	106	178	−72	0

16 September 2000
France	24–24	Slovenia
18 September 2000
Slovenia	30 – 32	Sweden
20 September 2000
Australia	20 – 33	Slovenia
22 September 2000
Spain	31 – 28	Slovenia
24 September 2000
Slovenia	22 – 20	Tunisia

=== Quarterfinal ===
Russia	33–22	Slovenia

=== 5th / 8th place ===
France	29–27	Slovenia

=== 7th / 8th place ===
Egypt	34–28	Slovenia

== Rowing ==
Men

Athlete	Event	Heats		Repechage		Semifinals C-D		Semifinals		Final	
Athlete	Event	Time	Rank	Time	Rank	Time	Rank	Time	Rank	Time	Rank
Iztok Čop; Luka Špik	Double sculls	6:24.92	1 Q	BYE		—		6:16.41	1 Q	6:16.63	Gold medal
Miha Pirih; Gregor Sračnjek	Coxless pair	6:55.82	4 R		3 Q	—		6:49.79	5 FB	6:40.23	11
Milan Janša; Janez Klemenčič; Rok Kolander; Matej Prelog	Coxless four	6:07.90	3 Q	BYE		—		6:04.07	2 Q	5:58.34	4

== Sailing ==
Men

Athlete	Event	Race											Net points	Final rank
Athlete	Event	1	2	3	4	5	6	7	8	9	10	11	Net points	Final rank
Tomaž Čopi; Mitja Margon	470	~~23~~	13	3	4	12	13	~~25~~	5	15	9	4	78	9

Women

Athlete	Event	Race											Net points	Final rank
Athlete	Event	1	2	3	4	5	6	7	8	9	10	11	Net points	Final rank
Janja Orel; Klara Maučec	470	15	~~19~~	12	~~19~~	16	2	15	11	14	15	17	117	17

Open

Athlete	Event	Race											Net points	Final rank
Athlete	Event	1	2	3	4	5	6	7	8	9	10	11	Net points	Final rank
Vasilij Žbogar	Laser	7	6	30	19	~~DNF~~	~~33~~	12	16	31	16	5	142	19

== Shooting ==
Men

Athlete	Event	Qualification		Final	
Athlete	Event	Score	Rank	Score	Rank
Rajmond Debevec	50 metre rifle three positions	1177 OR	1 Q	1275.1 OR	Gold medal
Rajmond Debevec	50 metre rifle prone	593	19	did not advance	
Rajmond Debevec	10 m air rifle	591	9	did not advance	
Andraz Lipolt	Trap	106	32	did not advance	

Women

Athlete	Event	Qualification		Final	
Athlete	Event	Score	Rank	Score	Rank
Natalija Prednik	10 m air rifle	391	20	did not advance	

== Swimming ==
Men

Athlete	Event	Heat		Semifinal		Final	
Athlete	Event	Time	Rank	Time	Rank	Time	Rank
Jure Bučar	400 m freestyle	4:00.19	35	did not advance			
Peter Mankoč	50 m freestyle	23.02	25	did not advance			
Peter Mankoč	100 m freestyle	50.28	21	did not advance			
Peter Mankoč	100 m butterfly	54.15	23	did not advance			
Peter Mankoč	200 m individual medley	2:03.45	18	did not advance			
Blaž Medvešek	100 m backstroke	57.26	32	did not advance			
Blaž Medvešek	200 m backstroke	2:01.67	23	did not advance			
Marko Milenkovič	400 m individual medley	4:26.62	30	did not advance			

Women

Athlete	Event	Heat		Semifinal		Final	
Athlete	Event	Time	Rank	Time	Rank	Time	Rank
Alenka Kejžar	200 m individual medley	2:18.33 NR	19	did not advance			
Nataša Kejžar	100 m breaststroke	1:10.44 NR	15	1:10.66	16	did not advance	

== Taekwondo ==
Men

Athlete	Event	Round of 16	Quarterfinals	Semifinals	Repechage 1	Repechage 2	Final / BM	
Athlete	Event	Opposition Result	Opposition Result	Opposition Result	Opposition Result	Opposition Result	Opposition Result	Rank
Marcel More	Men's −80 kg	BYE	Livaja (SWE); L 2–4	did not advance				

== Tennis ==
Women

Athlete	Event	Round of 32	Round of 16	Quarterfinals	Semifinals	Final / BM	
Athlete	Event	Opposition Score	Opposition Score	Opposition Score	Opposition Score	Opposition Score	Rank
Tina Pisnik	Women's singles	Tanasugarn (THA); L 4–6, 3–6	did not advance				
Katarina Srebotnik	Women's singles	Habšudová (SVK); L 3–6, 6–7 (7–9)	did not advance				
Katarina Srebotnik; Tina Križan	Women's doubles	Likhovtseva / Myskina (RUS); L 6–7 (4–6), 3–6	did not advance				
