= Narazaki =

Narazaki (written: 楢崎, 楢﨑 or 奈良崎) is a Japanese surname. Notable people with the surname include:

- Noriko Narazaki (楢崎 教子; born 1972), Japanese judoka
- Seigo Narazaki (楢﨑 正剛; born 1976), Japanese footballer
