= Cycling at the 2000 Summer Olympics – Men's cross-country =

Cycling at the Olympics

Men's cross-country at the Games of the XXVII Olympiad
- Date: 24 September
- Competitors: 49 from 26 nations
- Winning time: 2:09:02

Medalists
1st place, gold medalist(s)		Miguel Martinez; France
2nd place, silver medalist(s)		Filip Meirhaeghe; Belgium
3rd place, bronze medalist(s)		Christoph Sauser; Switzerland

These are the official results of the Men's Mountainbike Race at the 2000 Summer Olympics in Sydney, Australia. There were a total number of 49 participants, with twelve non-finishers, in this event over 49.5 kilometres, held on 24 September 2000 at the Fairfield City Farm.

== Medalists ==
Gold	Silver	Bronze
Miguel Martinez (FRA)	Filip Meirhaeghe (BEL)	Christoph Sauser (SUI)

== Final classification ==
Rank	Cyclist	NOC	Time
	Miguel Martinez	France	02:09:02
	Filip Meirhaeghe	Belgium	+ 1.03
	Christoph Sauser	Switzerland	+ 2.18
4	José Antonio Hermida	Spain	+ 2.40
5	Lado Fumic	Germany	+ 2.55
6	Thomas Frischknecht	Switzerland	+ 3.39
7	Cadel Evans	Australia	+ 4.29
8	Carsten Bresser	Germany	+ 4.34
9	Geoff Kabush	Canada	+ 4.58
10	Paul Rowney	Australia	+ 5.19
11	Bas van Dooren	Netherlands	+ 5.34
12	Bart Brentjens	Netherlands	+ 5.39
13	Rob Woods	Australia	+ 5.39
14	Roland Green	Canada	+ 6.16
15	Roberto Lezaun	Spain	+ 6.54
16	Marco Bui	Italy	+ 7.06
17	Kashi Leuchs	New Zealand	+ 7.35
18	Ludovic Dubau	France	+ 7.46
19	Roel Paulissen	Belgium	+ 7.52
20	Pavel Cherkasov	Russia	+ 8.19
21	Marek Galiński	Poland	+ 8.33
22	Michael Rasmussen	Denmark	+ 9.13
23	Oli Beckingsale	Great Britain	+ 9.14
24	Ziranda Madrigal	Mexico	+ 10.31
25	Nick Craig	Great Britain	+ 10.57
26	Mannie Heymans	Namibia	+ 11.29
27	Sergiy Rysenko	Ukraine	+ 11.37
28	Robin Seymour	Ireland	+ 11.37
29	Radim Korinek	Czech Republic	+ 12.06
30	Tinker Juarez	United States	+ 10.57
31	Hubert Pallhuber	Italy	+ 13.53
32	Travis Brown	United States	+ 13.59
33	José Adrián Bonilla	Costa Rica	+ 21.00
34	Raita Suzuki	Japan	+ 1 lap
35	Tom Larsen	Norway	+ 1 lap
36	Jesper Agergård	Denmark	+ 1 lap
37	Primoz Strancar	Slovenia	+ 1 lap
—	Gang Dong-u	South Korea	DNF
—	Ken Muhindi	Kenya	DNF
—	Renato Seabra	Brazil	DNF
—	Christophe Dupouey	France	DNF
—	Diego Garavito	Colombia	DNF
—	Ignacio Gili	Argentina	DNF
—	Peter Van Den Abeele	Belgium	DNF
—	Patrick Tolhoek	Netherlands	DNF
—	Rok Drasler	Slovenia	DNF
—	Derek Horton	Guam	DNF
—	Thomas Hochstrasser	Switzerland	DNF
—	Rune Høydahl	Norway	DNF

== See also ==
- Women's Cross Country Race
