= Tom Larsen =

Norwegian cyclist

Personal information
- Born: 22 April 1972 (age 54) Oslo, Norway

Cycling career
- Sport: Cycling

Tom Larsen (born 22 April 1972) is a Norwegian cyclist. He competed in the men's cross-country mountain biking event at the 2000 Summer Olympics.
