= Fabienne Dufour =

Belgian swimmer (born 1981)

Personal information
- Full name: Fabienne Dufour
- Nationality: Belgium
- Born: 11 July 1981 (age 44) Bastogne, Belgium
- Height: 1.76 m (5 ft 9 in)
- Weight: 67 kg (148 lb)

Sport
- Sport: Swimming
- Strokes: Butterfly and freestyle
Medal record
European LC Championships
Silver medal – second place	2000 Helsinki	4×100 m medley relay

Fabienne Dufour (born 11 July 1981 in Bastogne) is a retired female butterfly and freestyle swimmer from Belgium, who competed for her native country at the 2000 Olympic Games in Sydney, Australia.

Dufour is best known for winning the silver medal in the women's 4×100 m medley relay event at the 2000 European LC Championships in Helsinki, Finland, alongside Sofie Wolfs (backstroke), Brigitte Becue (breaststroke), and Nina van Koeckhoven (freestyle).
