= Sofie Wolfs =

Belgian swimmer (born 1981)

Personal information
- Full name: Sofie Wolfs
- Nationality: Belgium
- Born: 15 April 1981 (age 45) Kapellen, Antwerp
- Height: 1.69 m (5 ft 7 in)
- Weight: 61 kg (134 lb)

Sport
- Sport: Swimming
- Strokes: Backstroke
Medal record
European LC Championships
Silver medal – second place	2000 Helsinki	4×100 m medley relay

Sofie Wolfs (born 15 April 1981 in Kapellen, Antwerp) is a retired female backstroke swimmer from Belgium, who competed for her native country at the 2000 Olympic Games in Sydney, Australia.

Wolfs is best known for winning the silver medal in the women's 4×100 m medley relay event at the 2000 European LC Championships in Helsinki, Finland, alongside Brigitte Becue (breaststroke), Fabienne Dufour (butterfly), and Nina van Koeckhoven (freestyle).
