= Tennis at the 2000 Summer Olympics – Women's singles =

Women's singles
- Tennis at the 2000 Summer Olympics

Final
- Champion: Venus Williams (USA)
- Runner-up: Elena Dementieva (RUS)
- Score: 6–2, 6–4

Events
Singles	men	women
Doubles	men	women
- Summer Olympics

Women's singles tennis at the Games of the XXVII Olympiad
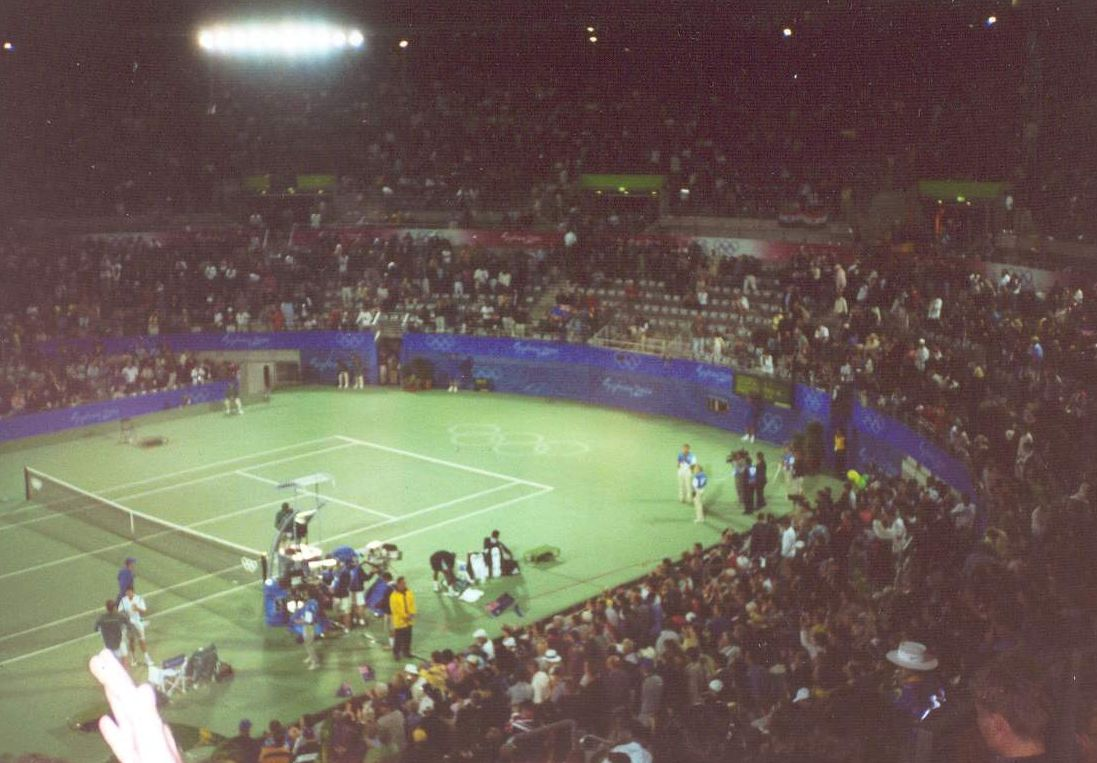
- Tennis at the 2000 Olympics
- Venue: Sydney Olympic Park Tennis Centre
- Dates: 19–27 September 2000
- Competitors: 64 from 33 nations

Medalists
1st place, gold medalist(s)		Venus Williams	United States
2nd place, silver medalist(s)		Elena Dementieva	Russia
3rd place, bronze medalist(s)		Monica Seles	United States

The United States' Venus Williams defeated Russia's Elena Dementieva in the final, 6–2, 6–4 to win the gold medal in Women's Singles tennis at the 2000 Summer Olympics. In the bronze medal match, the United States' Monica Seles defeated Australia's Jelena Dokic, 6–1, 6–4. Williams' victory was the third consecutive gold medal in the women's singles for the United States, all by different players (preceded by Jennifer Capriati and Lindsay Davenport).

The tournament was held at the Sydney Olympic Park Tennis Centre in Sydney, Australia from 19 September until 28 September. There were 64 competitors from 33 nations, with each nation having up to 3 players.

The United States' Davenport was the defending gold medalist from 1996, but she withdrew from her second round match due to injury.

== Background ==
This was the ninth appearance of the women's singles tennis. A women's event was held only once during the first three Games (only men's tennis was played in 1896 and 1904), but has been held at every Olympics for which there was a tennis tournament since 1908. Tennis was not a medal sport from 1928 to 1984, though there were demonstration events in 1968 and 1984.

Returning from the 1996 Games were gold medalist Lindsay Davenport of the United States, silver medalist (and 1992 bronze medalist) Arantxa Sánchez Vicario of Spain, and three of the four quarterfinal losers (Conchita Martínez of Spain, Iva Majoli of Croatia, and Monica Seles of the United States). Davenport and Seles were joined by Venus Williams, in the middle of a 35-match and 6-tournament winning streak, as the top 3 seeds in the tournament. Sánchez Vicario and Martínez were 4th and 5th; Spain and the United States were favourites.

Colombia, Haiti, Paraguay, Slovenia, Thailand, Uzbekistan, and Venezuela each made their debut in the event. France made its eighth appearance, most among nations to that point, having missed only the 1908 Games in London (when only British players competed).

== Competition format ==
The competition was a single-elimination tournament with a bronze medal match. Matches were all best-of-three sets. The 12-point tie-breaker was used in any set, except the third, that reached 6–6.

== Schedule ==
All times are Australian Eastern Standard Time (UTC+10)

Date	Time	Round
Tuesday, 19 September 2000; Wednesday, 20 September 2000	11:00	Round of 64
Thursday, 21 September 2000	11:00	Round of 32
Friday, 22 September 2000; Saturday, 23 September 2000	11:00	Round of 16
Sunday, 24 September 2000	11:45	Quarterfinals
Tuesday, 25 September 2000	11:00	Semifinals
Thursday, 26 September 2000	11:00	Bronze medal match
Friday, 27 September 2000	11:00	Final

== Seeds ==
1. Lindsay Davenport (USA) (second round, withdrew)
2. Venus Williams (USA) (Winner, gold medalist)
3. Monica Seles (USA) (semifinals, bronze medalist)
4. Conchita Martínez (ESP) (second round)
5. Arantxa Sánchez Vicario (ESP) (quarterfinals)
6. Anke Huber (GER) (withdrew)
7. Amanda Coetzer (RSA) (quarterfinals)
8. Dominique van Roost (BEL) (quarterfinals)
9. Amélie Mauresmo (FRA) (first round)
10. Elena Dementieva (RUS) (final, silver medalist)
11. Nathalie Dechy (FRA) (third round)
12. Barbara Schett (AUT) (quarterfinals)
13. Silvija Talaja (CRO) (second round)
14. Ai Sugiyama (JPN) (first round)
15. Elena Likhovtseva (RUS) (first round)
16. Sabine Appelmans (BEL) (third round)

== Competitors ==
Athlete	Nation
Lindsay Davenport	United States
Paola Suárez	Argentina
Rossana de los Ríos	Paraguay
Květa Peschke	Czech Republic
Rita Grande	Italy
Sylvia Pilschke	Austria
Jelena Dokic	Australia
Ai Sugiyama	Japan
Sabine Appelmans	Belgium
Sonya Jeyaseelan	Canada
Amanda Hopmans	Netherlands
María Vento-Kabchi	Venezuela
Anne Kremer	Luxembourg
Iva Majoli	Croatia
Rita Kuti-Kis	Hungary
Amanda Coetzer	South Africa
Conchita Martínez	Spain
Petra Mandula	Hungary
Katarina Srebotnik	Slovenia
Karina Habšudová	Slovakia
Iroda Tulyaganova	Uzbekistan
Kristie Boogert	Netherlands
Mirka Vavrinec	Switzerland
Elena Dementieva	Russia
Barbara Schett	Austria
Alicia Molik	Australia
Natasha Zvereva	Belarus
María Emilia Salerni	Argentina
Yi Jing-Qian	China
Dája Bedáňová	Czech Republic
Tathiana Garbin	Italy
Julie Halard-Decugis	France
Dominique Monami	Belgium
Adriana Gerši	Czech Republic
Eleni Daniilidou	Greece
Anastasia Myskina	Russia
Cara Black	Zimbabwe
Silvia Farina Elia	Italy
Neyssa Etienne	Haiti
Silvija Tajaja	Croatia
Nathalie Dechy	France
Magüi Serna	Spain
Ruxandra Dragomir	Romania
Nicole Pratt	Australia
Miriam Oremans	Netherlands
Florencia Labat	Argentina
Katalin Marosi	Hungary
Monica Seles	United States
Arantxa Sánchez Vicario	Spain
Li Na	China
Patricia Wartusch	Austria
Olga Barabanschikova	Belarus
Shinobu Asagoe	Japan
Els Callens	Belgium
Fabiola Zuluaga	Colombia
Amélie Mauresmo	France
Elena Likhovtseva	Russia
Jana Kandarr	Germany
Wynne Prakusya	Indonesia
Emmanuelle Gagliardi	Switzerland
Tina Pisnik	Slovenia
Tamarine Tanasugarn	Thailand
Henrieta Nagyová	Slovakia
Venus Williams	United States

== Draw ==
=== Key ===
- INV = Tripartite invitation
- IP = ITF place
- Alt = Alternate
- r = Retired
- w/o = Walkover

=== Finals ===
Quarter-finals
Jelena Dokić (AUS)	6	1	6
7	Amanda Coetzer (RSA)	1	6	1
10	Elena Dementieva (RUS)	2	6	6
12	Barbara Schett (AUT)	6	2	2
8	Dominique van Roost (BEL)	0	2
3	Monica Seles (USA)	6	6
5	Arantxa Sánchez Vicario (ESP)	6	2	4
2	Venus Williams (USA)	3	6	6

Semi-finals
Jelena Dokić (AUS)	6	4	4
10	Elena Dementieva (RUS)	2	6	6
3	Monica Seles (USA)	1	6	3
2	Venus Williams (USA)	6	4	6

Final
10	Elena Dementieva (RUS)	2	4
2	Venus Williams (USA)	6	6
Bronze medal match
Jelena Dokić (AUS)	1	4
3	Monica Seles (USA)	6	6

=== Top half ===
==== Section 1 ====
First round
1	L Davenport (USA)	6	6
P Suárez (ARG)	2	2
IP	R de los Ríos (PAR)	6	6
K Hrdličková (CZE)	3	0
R Grande (ITA)	6	6
S Plischke (AUT)	2	2
J Dokić (AUS)	6	7
14	A Sugiyama (JPN)	0	6^{1}
16	S Appelmans (BEL)	7	6
S Jeyaseelan (CAN)	5	2
A Hopmans (NED)	4	3
IP	MA Vento (VEN)	6	6
A Kremer (LUX)	6	6
IP	I Majoli (CRO)	2	4
R Kuti-Kis (HUN)	1	1
7	A Coetzer (RSA)	6	6

Second round
1	L Davenport (USA)
IP	R de los Ríos (PAR)	w/o
R Grande (ITA)	7	3	3
J Dokić (AUS)	5	6	6
16	S Appelmans (BEL)	6	6
IP	MA Vento (VEN)	2	2
A Kremer (LUX)	6	3	4
7	A Coetzer (RSA)	4	6	6

Third round
IP	R de los Ríos (PAR)	6^{5}	5
J Dokić (AUS)	7	7
16	S Appelmans (BEL)	3	1
7	A Coetzer (RSA)	6	6

Quarterfinals
J Dokić (AUS)	6	1	6
7	A Coetzer (RSA)	1	6	1

==== Section 2 ====
First round
4	C Martínez (ESP)	6	6
IP	P Mandula (HUN)	1	0
IP	K Srebotnik (SLO)	3	6^{7}
K Habšudová (SVK)	6	7
IP	I Tulyaganova (UZB)	2	2
K Boogert (NED)	6	6
IP	M Vavrinec (SUI)	1	1
10	E Dementieva (RUS)	6	6
12	B Schett (AUT)	7	6
IP	A Molik (AUS)	6^{7}	2
N Zvereva (BLR)	3	6	2
IP	ME Salerni (ARG)	6	4	6
J-Q Yi (CHN)	2	7	3
Alt	D Bedáňová (CZE)	6	6^{3}	6
T Garbin (ITA)	4	2
Alt	J Halard-Decugis (FRA)	6	6

Second round
4	C Martínez (ESP)	6	0	4
K Habšudová (SVK)	1	6	6
K Boogert (NED)	2	6	5
10	E Dementieva (RUS)	6	4	7
12	B Schett (AUT)	7	6
IP	ME Salerni (ARG)	6^{5}	4
Alt	D Bedáňová (CZE)	3	4
Alt	J Halard-Decugis (FRA)	6	6

Third round
K Habšudová (SVK)	2	1
10	E Dementieva (RUS)	6	6
12	B Schett (AUT)	2	6	6
Alt	J Halard-Decugis (FRA)	6	2	1

Quarterfinals
10	E Dementieva (RUS)	2	6	6
12	B Schett (AUT)	6	2	2

=== Bottom half ===
==== Section 3 ====
First round
8	D van Roost (BEL)	6	6
A Gerši (CZE)	1	1
IP	E Daniilidou (GRE)	1	5
A Myskina (RUS)	6	7
C Black (ZIM)	2	6	3
S Farina Elia (ITA)	6	3	6
INV	N Etienne (HAI)	1	0
13	S Talaja (CRO)	6	6
11	N Dechy (FRA)	6	6
M Serna (ESP)	1	2
R Dragomir (ROM)	3	3
N Pratt (AUS)	6	6
Alt	M Oremans (NED)	6	6
F Labat (ARG)	2	4
IP	K Marosi-Aracama (HUN)	0	1
3	M Seles (USA)	6	6

Second round
8	D van Roost (BEL)	6	6
A Myskina (RUS)	2	3
S Farina Elia (ITA)	3	6	6
13	S Talaja (CRO)	6	4	4
11	N Dechy (FRA)	6	6
N Pratt (AUS)	3	1
Alt	M Oremans (NED)	1	1
3	M Seles (USA)	6	6

Third round
8	D van Roost (BEL)	6	7
S Farina Elia (ITA)	1	5
11	N Dechy (FRA)	2	3
3	M Seles (USA)	6	6

Quarterfinals
8	D van Roost (BEL)	0	2
3	M Seles (USA)	6	6

==== Section 4 ====
First round
5	A Sánchez Vicario (ESP)	6	7
IP	N Li (CHN)	1	5
P Wartusch (AUT)	6	6
O Barabanschikova (BLR)	4	2
IP	S Asagoe (JPN)	0	4
Alt	E Callens (BEL)	6	6
F Zuluaga (COL)	6	3	6
9	A Mauresmo (FRA)	3	6	2
15	E Likhovtseva (RUS)	4	4
J Kandarr (GER)	6	6
INV	W Prakusya (INA)	4	6^{2}
E Gagliardi (SUI)	6	7
T Pisnik (SLO)	4	3
T Tanasugarn (THA)	6	6
H Nagyová (SVK)	2	2
2	V Williams (USA)	6	6

Second round
5	A Sánchez Vicario (ESP)	6	6
P Wartusch (AUT)	2	4
Alt	E Callens (BEL)	3	2
F Zuluaga (COL)	6	6
J Kandarr (GER)	7	6
E Gagliardi (SUI)	5	4
T Tanasugarn (THA)	2	3
2	V Williams (USA)	6	6

Third round
5	A Sánchez Vicario (ESP)	6	6
F Zuluaga (COL)	2	0
J Kandarr (GER)	2	2
2	V Williams (USA)	6	6

Quarterfinals
5	A Sánchez Vicario (ESP)	6	2	4
2	V Williams (USA)	3	6	6
