= Frans Swart =

South African sports shooter

Personal information
- Nationality: South African
- Born: 23 June 1962 (age 62)

Sport
- Sport: Sports shooting

Frans Swart (born 23 June 1962) is a South African sports shooter. He competed in the men's trap event at the 2000 Summer Olympics.
