= Tennis at the 2000 Summer Olympics – Women's doubles =

Women's doubles
- Tennis at the 2000 Summer Olympics

Final
- Champions: Serena Williams (United States) Venus Williams (USA)
- Runners-up: Kristie Boogert (Netherlands) Miriam Oremans (NED)
- Score: 6–1, 6–1

Events
Singles	men	women
Doubles	men	women
- Summer Olympics

The United States' Serena Williams and Venus Williams defeated the Netherlands' Kristie Boogert and Miriam Oremans in the final, 6–1, 6–1 to win the gold medal in Women's Doubles tennis at the 2000 Summer Olympics. It was the first of an eventual three gold medals at the event for the Williams sisters. In the bronze medal match, Belgium's Els Callens and Dominique Van Roost defeated Belarus' Olga Barabanschikova and Natalia Zvereva, 4–6, 6–4, 6–1.

The tournament was held in the Tennis Centre, Sydney Olympic Park in Sydney, Australia from 21 September till 28 September.

The United States' Gigi Fernández and Mary Joe Fernandez were the two-time reigning gold medalists, but Gigi Fernández retired from the sport in 1997 and Mary Joe Fernandez did not participate.

== Medals ==
Gold	Serena Williams (USA); Venus Williams (USA)
Silver	Kristie Boogert (NED); Miriam Oremans (NED)
Bronze	Els Callens (BEL); Dominique Van Roost (BEL)

== Seeds ==
1. Julie Halard-Decugis / Amélie Mauresmo (FRA) (Quarterfinalists)
2. Conchita Martínez / Arantxa Sánchez Vicario (ESP) (second round)
3. Laura Montalvo / Paola Suárez (ARG) (second round)
4. Nana Miyagi / Ai Sugiyama (JPN) (second round)
5. Els Callens / Dominique van Roost (BEL) (semifinalists, bronze medalists)
6. Jelena Dokić / Rennae Stubbs (AUS) (second round)
7. Tina Križan / Katarina Srebotnik (SLO) (first round)
8. Amanda Coetzer / Liezel Horn (RSA) (first round)

== Draw ==
=== Finals ===
Semifinals
Serena Williams (USA); Venus Williams (USA)	6	6
5	Els Callens (BEL); Dominique van Roost (BEL)	4	1
Kristie Boogert (NED); Miriam Oremans (NED)	6	6
Olga Barabanschikova (BLR); Natalia Zvereva (BLR)	3	2

Final
Serena Williams (USA); Venus Williams (USA)	6	6
Kristie Boogert (NED); Miriam Oremans (NED)	1	1
Bronze medal match
5	Els Callens (BEL); Dominique van Roost (BEL)	4	6	6
Olga Barabanschikova (BLR); Natalia Zvereva (BLR)	6	4	1

=== Top half ===
1st round
J Lee (TPE); T Weng (TPE)	3	6^{4}
E Tatarkova (UKR); A Zaporozhanova (UKR)	6	7
S Jeyaseelan (CAN); V Webb (CAN)	3	1
S Williams (USA); V Williams (USA)	6	6
E Likhovtseva (RUS); A Myskina (RUS)	7	6
7	T Križan (SLO); K Srebotnik (SLO)	6^{4}	3
3	L Montalvo (ARG); P Suárez (ARG)	6	6
S Farina Elia (ITA); R Grande (ITA)	0	0
E Gagliardi (SUI); M Vavrinec (SUI)	2	5
M Sequera (VEN); M Vento (VEN)	6	7
K Habšudová (SVK); J Husárová (SVK)	7	6^{2}	6
Cho Y-J (KOR); S-H Park (KOR)	5	7	4
I Majoli (CRO); S Talaja (CRO)	2	7	2
5	E Callens (BEL); D van Roost (BEL)	6	5	6

2nd round
1	J Halard-Decugis (FRA); A Mauresmo (FRA)	6	6
E Tatarkova (UKR); A Zaporozhanova (UKR)	2	4
S Williams (USA); V Williams (USA)	4	6	6
E Likhovtseva (RUS); A Myskina (RUS)	6	2	3
3	L Montalvo (ARG); P Suárez (ARG)	4	1
M Sequera (VEN); M Vento (VEN)	6	6
K Habšudová (SVK); J Husárová (SVK)	3	2
5	E Callens (BEL); D van Roost (BEL)	6	6

Quarterfinals
1	J Halard-Decugis (FRA); A Mauresmo (FRA)	3	2
S Williams (USA); V Williams (USA)	6	6
M Sequera (VEN); M Vento (VEN)	6	5	4
5	E Callens (BEL); D van Roost (BEL)	4	7	6

Semifinals
S Williams (USA); V Williams (USA)	6	6
5	E Callens (BEL); D van Roost (BEL)	4	1

=== Bottom half ===
1st round
6	J Dokić (AUS); R Stubbs (AUS)	6	6
M Malhotra (IND); N Vaidyanathan (IND)	0	0
J Pullin (GBR); L Woodroffe (GBR)	2	1
K Boogert (NED); M Oremans (NED)	6	6
M Mesa (COL); F Zuluaga (COL)	6^{4}	7	4
B Sangaram (THA); T Tanasugarn (THA)	7	5	6
N Basuki (INA); W Prakusya (INA)	2	7	4
4	N Miyagi (JPN); A Sugiyama (JPN)	6	5	6
8	A Coetzer (RSA); L Horn (RSA)	4	3
P Mandula (HUN); K Marosi-Aracama (HUN)	6	6
N Li (CHN); T Li (CHN)	4	2
J Cortez (BRA); V Menga (BRA)	6	6
B Schett (AUT); P Wartusch (AUT)	2	2
O Barabanschikova (BLR); N Zvereva (BLR)	6	6
D Bedáňová (CZE); K Hrdličková (CZE)	4	3
2	C Martínez (ESP); A Sánchez Vicario (ESP)	6	6

2nd round
6	J Dokić (AUS); R Stubbs (AUS)	6	6^{4}	4
K Boogert (NED); M Oremans (NED)	2	7	6
B Sangaram (THA); T Tanasugarn (THA)	2	7	6
4	N Miyagi (JPN); A Sugiyama (JPN)	6	5	2
P Mandula (HUN); K Marosi-Aracama (HUN)	6	6
J Cortez (BRA); V Menga (BRA)	2	3
O Barabanschikova (BLR); N Zvereva (BLR)	6	7
2	C Martínez (ESP); A Sánchez Vicario (ESP)	4	5

Quarterfinals
K Boogert (NED); M Oremans (NED)	6	3	7
B Sangaram (THA); T Tanasugarn (THA)	4	6	5
P Mandula (HUN); K Marosi-Aracama (HUN)	3	5
O Barabanschikova (BLR); N Zvereva (BLR)	6	7

Semifinals
K Boogert (NED); M Oremans (NED)	6	6
O Barabanschikova (BLR); N Zvereva (BLR)	3	2
