= Liu Yuxiang =

Chinese judoka (born 1975)

Personal information
- Born: 11 October 1975 (age 51)
- Occupation: Judoka

Sport
- Country: China
- Sport: Judo
- Weight class: –52 kg, –57 kg

Achievements and titles
- Olympic Games: (bronze) (2000)
- World Champ.: (bronze) (2001)
- Asian Champ.: (gold) (2004)
Medal record
Women's judo
Representing China
Olympic Games
Bronze medal – third place	2000 Sydney	‍–‍52 kg
World Championships
Bronze medal – third place	2001 Munich	‍–‍52 kg
Asian Championships
Gold medal – first place	2004 Almaty	‍–‍57 kg
Silver medal – second place	1999 Wenzhou	‍–‍52 kg

Profile at external databases
- IJF: 3937
- JudoInside.com: 6509
- Updated on 1 June 2023

Liu Yuxiang (simplified Chinese: 刘玉香; traditional Chinese: 劉玉香; pinyin: Liú Yùxiāng; born 11 October 1975 in Hengyang, Hunan) is a Chinese judoka who competed in the 2000 Summer Olympics and in the 2004 Summer Olympics.

Liu won abronze medal in the half lightweight class in 2000. Four years later she was eliminated in the round of 16 of the lightweight class.
