= Paul Rowney =

Australian cyclist

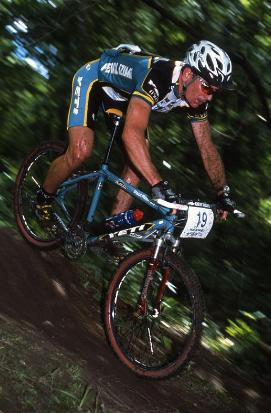

Personal information
- Full name: Paul Rowney
- Born: 2 December 1970 (age 55) Botany

Cycling career
- Sport: Cycling
- Current team: Retired
- Discipline: Mountain Bike
- Role: Rider
- Rider type: Cross Country

Professional team
- Yeti Factory Team

Paul Rowney (born 2 December 1970 in Botany, Australia) is an Australian Olympic cyclist.

He placed 10th in the Men's Mountainbike Race at the 2000 Summer Olympics in Sydney, Australia. He has won three Australian championships in mountain biking. He was an Australian Institute of Sport scholarship holder.

Rowney rode for the Yeti Cycles Factory Team and since retiring continues to act as their representative in Australia.

He is the grandson of James Patterson, a former Australian champion in the 10 mile and Australian representative at the 1938 British Empire Games in the marathon.
