= Gang Dong-u =

South Korean cyclist

Personal information
- Born: 10 February 1978 (age 48)

Cycling career
- Sport: Cycling

Gang Dong-u (born 10 February 1978) is a South Korean cyclist. He competed in the men's cross-country mountain biking event at the 2000 Summer Olympics.
