= Pavel Cherkasov =

Russian cyclist

Personal information
- Born: 13 May 1972 (age 54) Bryansk, Russia

Cycling career
- Sport: Cycling

Pavel Cherkasov (born 13 May 1972) is a Russian cyclist. He competed in the men's cross-country mountain biking event at the 2000 Summer Olympics.
