= Raita Suzuki =

Japanese cyclist

Personal information
- Born: 11 August 1972 (age 54) Okazaki, Japan

Cycling career
- Sport: Cycling

Raita Suzuki (鈴木 雷太, Suzuki Raita; born 11 August 1972) is a Japanese cyclist. He competed in the men's cross-country mountain biking event at the 2000 Summer Olympics.
