= Zoran Novaković =

Bosnian sports shooter

Personal information
- Nationality: Bosnian
- Born: 22 April 1960 (age 65)

Sport
- Sport: Sports shooting

Zoran Novaković (born 22 April 1960) is a Bosnian sports shooter. He competed in the men's trap event at the 2000 Summer Olympics.
