= Jorge Guarnieri =

Argentine sports shooter

Personal information
- Nationality: Argentine
- Born: 23 May 1955 (age 69)

Sport
- Sport: Sports shooting

Jorge Guarnieri (born 23 May 1955) is an Argentine sports shooter. He competed in the men's trap event at the 2000 Summer Olympics in Sydney, Australia.
