= Judith Esseng Abolo =

Cameroonian judoka (born 1979)

Personal information
- Nationality: Cameroonian
- Born: 21 January 1979 (age 47)

Sport
- Sport: Judo

Judith Esseng Abolo (born 21 January 1979) is a Cameroonian former judoka. She competed in the women's half-lightweight event at the 2000 Summer Olympics.
