= Ioana Maria Aluaș =

Romanian judoka

Personal information
- Born: 18 June 1975 (age 51)
- Occupation: Judoka

Sport
- Country: Romania
- Sport: Judo
- Weight class: –52 kg

Achievements and titles
- Olympic Games: 5th (2000)
- World Champ.: 5th (2005)
- European Champ.: (gold) (2004)
Medal record
Women's judo
Representing Romania
European Championships
Gold medal – first place	2004 Bucharest	–52 kg
Silver medal – second place	2005 Rotterdam	–52 kg
Silver medal – second place	2006 Tampere	–52 kg
Bronze medal – third place	2000 Wrocław	–52 kg
Bronze medal – third place	2001 Paris	–52 kg
Bronze medal – third place	2008 Lisbon	–52 kg
Summer Universiade
Gold medal – first place	1995 Fukuoka	–52 kg

Profile at external databases
- IJF: 52947
- JudoInside.com: 548
- Updated on 17 November 2022

Ioana Maria Aluaş (née Dinea, born 18 June 1975) is a Romanian former judoka who competed in the 2000 Summer Olympics and in the 2004 Summer Olympics.
