= Sergey Lyubomirov =

Russian sports shooter

Personal information
- Nationality: Russian
- Born: 23 September 1968 (age 57) Moscow, Russia

Sport
- Sport: Sports shooting

Sergey Lyubomirov ((Russian: Сергей Борисович Любомиров; born 23 September 1968) is a Russian sports shooter. He competed in the men's trap event at the 2000 Summer Olympics.
