= Marek Galiński (cyclist) =

Polish cyclist (1974–2014)

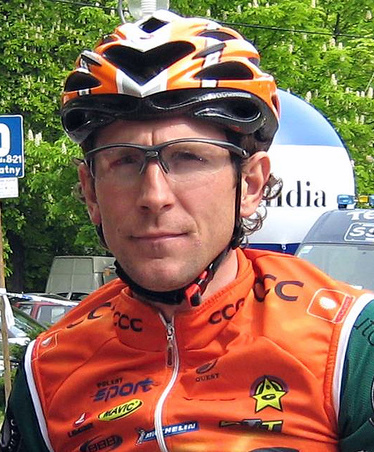

Personal information
- Full name: Marek Galiński
- Born: 1 August 1974 Opoczno, Poland
- Died: 17 March 2014 (aged 39) Jędrzejów, Poland
- Height: 1.75 m (5 ft 9 in)
- Weight: 63 kg (139 lb)

Cycling career
- Sport: Cycling
- Discipline: Mountain biking
- Role: Rider
- Rider type: Cross-country

Professional teams
- 2001: Lotto-PZU
- 2002–2003: CCC–Polsat
- 2003–2004: Club Deportivo Orbea
- 2004: Hoop–CCC–Polsat
- 2005: Orbea (MTB)
- 2006: Grupa PSB
- 2007: CCC–Polsat–Polkowice
- 2008: JBG2-APC Presmet
- 2008–2011: JBG2 Professional MTB Team

Marek Galiński (1 August 1974 – 17 March 2014) was a Polish professional mountain biker and road racing cyclist. During his sporting career, he won nine Polish national championship titles and a silver medal in men's cross-country racing at the 2003 UCI World Cup series in Sankt Wendel, Germany. Galinski also represented his nation Poland in four editions of the Olympic Games (1996, 2000, 2004, and 2008), where he competed in men's mountain biking from the time that it officially became an Olympic sport in 1996. Galinski raced professionally for more than five seasons on the JBG2 Professional MTB Team. After his retirement from the sport in 2011, Galinski worked as an assistant coach of both Polish and Russian mountain bike national teams. Upon his return from a training camp in Cyprus on 17 March 2014, Galinski was suddenly killed in a car accident near Jędrzejów.

== Racing career ==
Galinski made his official international debut for Poland at the 1996 Summer Olympics in Atlanta, where he finished twenty-ninth in the inaugural men's cross-country race with a time of 2:45:54.

At the 2000 Summer Olympics in Sydney, Galinski further excelled his cross-country ride from Atlanta with a twenty-first-place effort in the same program, posting an official time of 2:17:35.

In 2001, Galinski turned himself into an elite professional rider by signing an exclusive sponsorship contract with the Lotto-PZU cycling team, followed by short stints on the CCC–Polsat and Club Deportivo Orbea MTB teams. Later the mountain biker's career flourished with his early career highlight the earning of a silver medal at the UCI World Cup series in Sankt Wendel, Germany, trailing behind leader and Swiss rider Christoph Sauser by eleven seconds.

While competing for his third Polish squad at the 2004 Summer Olympics in Athens, Galinski scored a career-high, fourteenth place in the men's cross-country race with a time of 2:22:14, edging out Austria's Christoph Soukup on the final lap by a 36-second limit. In that same year, Galinski grabbed his first ever Polish national championship title in men's mountain biking, and mounted a top-five finish at the UCI World Championships in Les Gets, France.

Twelve years after his official Olympic debut, Galinski qualified for his fourth Polish squad, as a 34-year-old and the nation's cycling team captain, in the men's cross-country race at the 2008 Summer Olympics in Beijing by receiving an automatic berth for his team from the Polish Cycling Federation (Polish: Polski Związek Kolarski) and Union Cycliste Internationale (UCI), based on his best performance at the World Cup series, World Championships, and Mountain Biking World Series. Galinski lost a spirited challenge against Great Britain's Oliver Beckingsale, but managed to pick up a thirteenth spot to complete a 4.8-km sturdy, treacherous cross-country course in 2:01:29, recording the highest position in his entire Olympic career.

Shortly after the Olympics, Galinski continued to ride for the JBG2 Professional MTB Team, and eventually accepted an offer from the Polish and Russian mountain bike teams to be their assistant coach. Indeed, he coached the women's national team at the 2012 Summer Olympics in London.

== Death ==
On 17 March 2014, just shortly after midnight, Galinski had reportedly landed in Kraków upon his return from a training camp in Cyprus and was driving a car to his hometown Opoczno, when he skidded off the road going around the bend and hit a tree through the outskirts of Jędrzejów. Rescuers had to free him with hydraulic tools upon releasing him from a traffic collision, but his injuries proved fatal after being taken to the hospital. Galinski died in a car accident at the age of 39.

== Career achievements ==
1996
1st Polish MTB Championships (Cyclo-cross, U23), Nowogard (POL)
29th Olympic Games (Cross-country), Atlanta, Georgia, (USA)
1998
3rd Polish MTB Championships (Cyclo-cross), Ełk (POL)
2000
2nd Stage 6, Bałtyk–Karkonosze Tour, Jelenia Góra (POL)
3rd Stage 5, Tour of Macedonia, Strumica (MKD)
21st Olympic Games (Cross-country), Sydney, (AUS)
25th UCI World Championships (Cross-country), Sierra Nevada, (ESP)
2002
14th UCI World Championships (Cross-country), Kaprun, (AUT)
2003
9th Overall, UCI World Cup (Cross-country)

(silver) Stage 2, Sankt Wendel (GER)

2004
1st Polish MTB Championships (Cross-country), Kielce (POL)
5th UCI World Championships (Cross-country), Les Gets, (FRA)
14th Olympic Games (Cross-country), Athens, (GRE)
2005
1st Polish MTB Championships (Cross-country), Olsztyn (POL)
11th Stage 1, UCI World Cup (Cross-country), Spa Francorchamps (BEL)
2006
1st Polish MTB Championships (Cross-country), Wałbrzych (POL)
8th UCI World Championships (Cross-country), Livigno, (ITA)
2007
1st Polish MTB Championships (Cross-country), Szczawno-Zdrój (POL)
2008
1st Polish MTB Championships (Cross-country), Kielce (POL)
13th Olympic Games (Cross-country), Beijing (CHN)
17th UCI World Championships (Cross-country), Val di Sole (ITA)
2009
1st Polish MTB Championships (Cross-country), Kielce (POL)
2010
1st Polish MTB Championships (Cross-country), Wałbrzych (POL)
2011
1st Polish MTB Championships (Cross-country), Poland
2012
2nd Polish MTB Championships (Cross-country), Poland
