= Tennis at the 2000 Summer Olympics – Men's doubles =

Men's doubles
- Tennis at the 2000 Summer Olympics

Final
- Champions: Sébastien Lareau (Canada) Daniel Nestor (CAN)
- Runners-up: Todd Woodbridge (Australia) Mark Woodforde (AUS)
- Score: 5–7, 6–3, 6–4, 7–6^{(7–2)}

Events
Singles	men	women
Doubles	men	women
- Summer Olympics

Men's doubles at the Games of the XXVII Olympiad
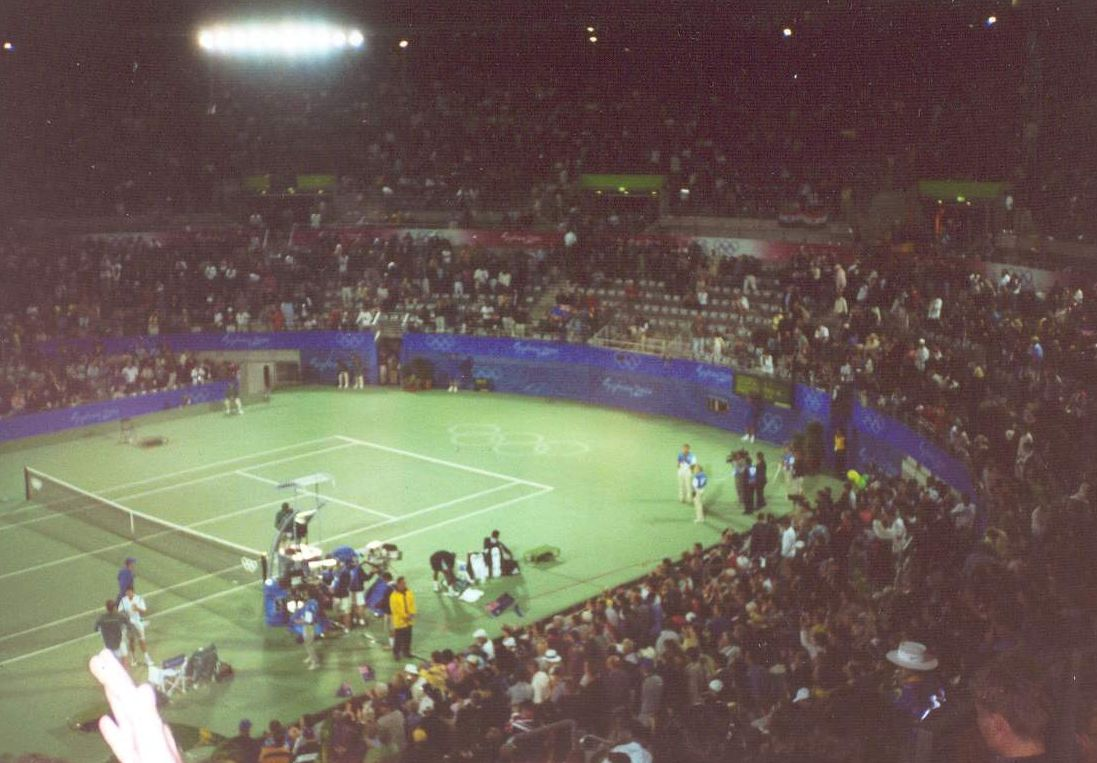
- Tennis at the 2000 Olympics
- Venue: Sydney Olympic Park Tennis Centre
- Dates: 20–27 September 2000
- Competitors: 29 teams (58 players) from 29 nations

Medalists
1st place, gold medalist(s)		Sébastien Lareau; Daniel Nestor; Canada
2nd place, silver medalist(s)		Todd Woodbridge; Mark Woodforde; Australia
3rd place, bronze medalist(s)		Àlex Corretja; Albert Costa; Spain

Canada's Sébastien Lareau and Daniel Nestor defeated the defending gold medalists, Australia's Todd Woodbridge and Mark Woodforde, in the final, 5–7, 6–3, 6–4, 7–6^{(7–2)} to win the gold medal in Men's Doubles tennis at the 2000 Summer Olympics. It was Canada's first men's doubles medal. The Woodies became the first pair to win multiple medals in the event, and the second and third individuals to do so (Reginald Doherty won two golds with different partners in 1900 and 1908). In the bronze medal match, Spain's Àlex Corretja and Albert Costa defeated South Africa's David Adams and John-Laffnie de Jager, 2–6, 6–4, 6–3. It was Spain's second (after 1988) medal at the event.

The tournament was held in the Sydney Olympic Park Tennis Centre in Sydney, Australia from 20 to 27 September 2000. There were 29 pairs from 29 nations, with each nation limited to one pair (two players).

== Background ==
This was the 11th appearance of men's doubles tennis. The event has been held at every Summer Olympics where tennis has been on the program: from 1896 to 1924 and then from 1988 to the current program. A demonstration event was held in 1968.

Todd Woodbridge and Mark Woodforde were the defending champions, host nation heroes, number one seeds, and favorites. 1996 bronze medalist David Prinosil of Germany returned, now partnered with Tommy Haas.

Belarus made its debut in the event. Russia made its first separate appearance since 1912. Great Britain made its ninth appearance in the event, most of any nation.

== Competition format ==
The competition was a single-elimination tournament with a bronze medal match. All matches except the final were best-of-three sets; the final was best-of-five. Tiebreaks were used for any set before the third (fifth in the final) that reached 6–6.

== Schedule ==
All times are Australian Eastern Standard Time (UTC+10)

Date	Time	Round
Wednesday, September 20, 2000; Thursday, September 21, 2000; Friday, September 22, 2000	11:00	Round of 32
Friday, September 22, 2000; Saturday, September 23, 2000	11:00	Round of 16 (Octofinals)
Sunday, September 24, 2000; Monday, September 25, 2000; Tuesday, September 26, 2000	11:45	Quarterfinals
Monday, September 25, 2000	11:00	Semifinals
Wednesday, September 27, 2000	11:00	Bronze medal match Final

== Seeds ==
The top three seeds received byes into the second round.

1. Todd Woodbridge / Mark Woodforde (AUS) (final, silver medalists)
2. Alex O'Brien / Jared Palmer (USA) (second round)
3. Jiří Novák / David Rikl (CZE) (second round)
4. Sébastien Lareau / Daniel Nestor (CAN) (champions, gold medalists)
5. David Adams / John-Laffnie de Jager (RSA) (semifinalists, fourth place)
6. Nicklas Kulti / Mikael Tillström (SWE) (first round)
7. Wayne Black / Kevin Ullyett (ZIM) (first round)
8. Massimo Bertolini / Cristian Brandi (ITA) (second round)

== Competitors ==
Players	Nation
Todd Woodbridge; Mark Woodforde	Australia
Mahesh Bhupathi; Leander Paes	India
Andrei Pavel; Gabriel Trifu	Romania
Satoshi Iwabuchi; Thomas Shimada	Japan
Dominik Hrbatý; Karol Kučera	Slovakia
Gábor Köves; Attila Sávolt	Hungary
Massimo Bertolini; Cristian Brandi	Italy
Jiří Novák; David Rikl	Czech Republic
Juan Ignacio Chela; Mariano Zabaleta	Argentina
Álex Corretja; Albert Costa	Spain
Arnaud Clément; Nicolas Escudé	France
Dušan Vemić; Nenad Zimonjić	FR Yugoslavia
Max Mirnyi; Vladimir Voltchkov	Belarus
Nicklas Kulti; Mikael Tillström	Sweden
Wayne Black; Kevin Ullyett	Zimbabwe
Tommy Haas; David Prinosil	Germany
Lee Hyung-taik; Yoon Yong-Il	South Korea
Nicolás Massú; Marcelo Ríos	Chile
José de Armas; Jimy Szymanski	Venezuela
Mario Ančić; Goran Ivanišević	Croatia
Gustavo Kuerten; Jaime Oncins	Brazil
Sébastien Lareau; Daniel Nestor	Canada
David Adams; John-Laffnie de Jager	South Africa
Enrique Abaroa; Alejandro Hernández	Mexico
Yevgeny Kafelnikov; Marat Safin	Russia
Barry Cowan; Kyle Spencer	Great Britain
Nuno Marques; Bernardo Mota	Portugal
Mark Knowles; Mark Merklein	Bahamas
Alex O’Brien; Jared Palmer	United States

== Draw ==
=== Finals ===
Semifinals
1	Todd Woodbridge (AUS); Mark Woodforde (AUS)	6	7^{7}
Àlex Corretja (ESP); Albert Costa (ESP)	3	6^{5}
4	Sébastien Lareau (CAN); Daniel Nestor (CAN)	6	6
5	David Adams (RSA); John-Laffnie de Jager (RSA)	1	2

Finals
1	Todd Woodbridge (AUS); Mark Woodforde (AUS)	7	3	4	6^{2}
4	Sébastien Lareau (CAN); Daniel Nestor (CAN)	5	6	6	7^{7}
Third place
Àlex Corretja (ESP); Albert Costa (ESP)	2	6	6
5	David Adams (RSA); John-Laffnie de Jager (RSA)	6	4	3

=== Top half ===
1st round
M Bhupathi (IND); L Paes (IND)	6	6
A Pavel (ROU); G Trifu (ROU)	3	4
S Iwabuchi (JPN); T Shimada (JPN)	4	3
D Hrbatý (SVK); K Kučera (SVK)	6	6
G Köves (HUN); A Sávolt (HUN)	6	2	2
8	M Bertolini (ITA); C Brandi (ITA)	3	6	6
JI Chela (ARG); M Zabaleta (ARG)	3	4
À Corretja (ESP); À Costa (ESP)	6	6
A Clément (FRA); N Escudé (FRA)	6	6
D Vemić (YUG); N Zimonjić (YUG)	2	2
M Mirnyi (BLR); V Voltchkov (BLR)	6	4
6	N Kulti (SWE); M Tillström (SWE)	3	4	r

2nd round
1	T Woodbridge (AUS); M Woodforde (AUS)	6	7^{7}
M Bhupathi (IND); L Paes (IND)	3	6^{1}
D Hrbatý (SVK); K Kučera (SVK)	6	6^{5}	6
8	M Bertolini (ITA); C Brandi (ITA)	4	7^{7}	3
3	J Novák (CZE); D Rikl (CZE)	7^{8}	5	4
À Corretja (ESP); À Costa (ESP)	6^{6}	7	6
A Clément (FRA); N Escudé (FRA)	4	6^{4}
M Mirnyi (BLR); V Voltchkov (BLR)	6	7^{7}

Quarterfinals
1	T Woodbridge (AUS); M Woodforde (AUS)	7^{7}	6
D Hrbatý (SVK); K Kučera (SVK)	6^{5}	4
À Corretja (ESP); À Costa (ESP)	6^{4}	6	7
M Mirnyi (BLR); V Voltchkov (BLR)	7^{7}	3	5

Semifinals
1	T Woodbridge (AUS); M Woodforde (AUS)	6	7^{7}
À Corretja (ESP); À Costa (ESP)	3	6^{5}

=== Bottom half ===
1st round
7	W Black (ZIM); K Ullyett (ZIM)	1	4
T Haas (GER); D Prinosil (GER)	6	6
H-T Lee (KOR); Y-I Yoon (KOR)	6	6
N Massú (CHI); M Ríos (CHI)	3	4
J Armas (VEN); J Szymanski (VEN)	6	7^{7}
M Ančić (CRO); G Ivanišević (CRO)	2	6^{3}
G Kuerten (BRA); J Oncins (BRA)	1	4
4	S Lareau (CAN); D Nestor (CAN)	6	6
5	D Adams (RSA); J-F de Jager (RSA)	6	7^{7}
E Abaroa (MEX); A Hernández (MEX)	4	6^{4}
Y Kafelnikov (RUS); M Safin (RUS)	7^{7}	6
B Cowan (GBR); K Spencer (GBR)	6^{2}	4
N Marques (POR); B Mota (POR)	7^{9}	4	5
M Knowles (BAH); M Merklein (BAH)	6^{7}	6	7

2nd round
T Haas (GER); D Prinosil (GER)	6	7
H-T Lee (KOR); Y-I Yoon (KOR)	4	5
J Armas (VEN); J Szymanski (VEN)	3	4
4	S Lareau (CAN); D Nestor (CAN)	6	6
5	D Adams (RSA); J-F de Jager (RSA)	6	3	9
Y Kafelnikov (RUS); M Safin (RUS)	3	6	7
M Knowles (BAH); M Merklein (BAH)	6	6
2	A O'Brien (USA); J Palmer (USA)	2	4

Quarterfinals
T Haas (GER); D Prinosil (GER)	0	4
4	S Lareau (CAN); D Nestor (CAN)	6	6
5	D Adams (RSA); J-F de Jager (RSA)	4	6	14
M Knowles (BAH); M Merklein (BAH)	6	2	12

Semifinals
4	S Lareau (CAN); D Nestor (CAN)	6	6
5	D Adams (RSA); J-F de Jager (RSA)	1	2
