= Shooting at the 2000 Summer Olympics – Men's trap =

Sports shooting at the Olympics

Men's trap at the Games of the XXVII Olympiad
- Shooting pictogram
- Venue: Sydney International Shooting Centre
- Dates: 16 September 2000; 17 September 2000
- Competitors: 41 from 29 nations
- Winning score: 147

Medalists
1st place, gold medalist(s)		Michael Diamond	Australia
2nd place, silver medalist(s)		Ian Peel	Great Britain
3rd place, bronze medalist(s)		Giovanni Pellielo	Italy

The men's trap shooting competition at the 2000 Summer Olympics was held on 16 and 17 September at the Sydney International Shooting Centre. There were 41 competitors from 29 nations, with each nation having up to three shooters. By defending his title from Atlanta, Michael Diamond won the host country's only gold medal in the shooting competitions. Diamond was the second man to successfully defend an Olympic title in the trap (after Luciano Giovannetti of Italy in 1980 and 1984). Ian Peel earned Great Britain's first men's trap medal since 1968. Italy's Giovanni Pellielo earned bronze.

== Background ==
This was the 18th appearance of the men's ISSF Olympic trap event. The event was held at every Summer Olympics from 1896 to 1924 (except 1904, when no shooting events were held) and from 1952 to 2016; it was open to women from 1968 to 1992.

Three of the 6 finalists from the 1996 Games (the three medalists) returned: gold medalist Michael Diamond of Australia and Americans silver medalist Josh Lakatos and bronze medalist Lance Bade. Diamond was also the reigning World Champion, winning in 1999 after silver medals in 1991 and 1995. Three-time World Champion (1995–1997) Giovanni Pellielo, the first man to score a perfect 125-target qualifying round, was a contender to unseat Diamond. Bade had also hit a perfect qualifying round. (Diamond would eventually do so, but not until 2012.)

Bosnia and Herzegovina, Russia, Slovenia, and the United Arab Emirates each made their debut in the event. Great Britain made its 17th appearance, most among nations, having missed only the 1980 Moscow Games.

== Competition format ==
The competition used the two-round 125+25 format introduced in 1996. The qualifying round consisted of 125 targets (in 5 series of 25, held over two days with 3 series the first day and 2 series the second). The top six shooters advanced to the final. The final was a single series of 25 targets; the total score over all 6 series (150 targets) determined the winner. Shoot-offs were used as necessary to break ties for qualifying for the final and in the final.

== Records ==
The existing world and Olympic records were as follows.

Qualifying round
World record	Giovanni Pellielo (ITA)	125	Nicosia, Cyprus	1 April 1994
Olympic record	Michael Diamond (AUS)	124	Atlanta, United States	21 July 1996

Final
World record	Marcello Tittarelli (ITA)	150	Suhl, Germany	11 June 1996
Olympic record	Michael Diamond (AUS)	149	Atlanta, United States	21 July 1996

No new world or Olympic records were set during the competition.

== Schedule ==
Date	Time	Round
Saturday, 16 September 2000	10:00	Qualifying: Course 1
Sunday, 17 September 2000	10:00	Qualifying: Course 2 Final

== Results ==
=== Qualifying round ===
The qualifying round comprised 75 targets on day 1, and 50 targets on day 2.

Rank	Shooter	Nation	Day 1	Day 2	Total	Shoot-off	Notes
1	Michael Diamond	Australia	72	50	122	—	Q
2	Ian Peel	Great Britain	70	48	118	—	Q
3	David Kostelecký	Czech Republic	70	46	116	—	Q
4	Giovanni Pellielo	Italy	70	46	116	—	Q
5	Khaled Al-Mudhaf	Kuwait	67	48	115	1	Q
6	Marco Venturini	Italy	68	47	115	1	Q
7	Danilo Caro	Colombia	67	48	115	0	
8	Christophe Vicard	France	68	47	115	0	
9	Alexey Alipov	Russia	68	46	114	—	
9	Thomas Fichtner	Germany	67	47	114	—	
9	George Leary	Canada	69	45	114	—	
9	Zhang Yongjie	China	67	47	114	—	
13	Russell Mark	Australia	65	48	113	—	
13	Conny Persson	Sweden	67	46	113	—	
13	Waldemar Schanz	Germany	66	47	113	—	
16	Lance Bade	United States	66	46	112	—	
16	Joshua Lakatos	United States	67	45	112	—	
18	Ahmed Al Maktoum	United Arab Emirates	66	45	111	—	
18	Derek Burnett	Ireland	66	45	111	—	
18	Custódio Ezequiel	Portugal	65	46	111	—	
18	Rodolfo Viganò	Italy	68	43	111	—	
22	David Malone	Ireland	66	44	110	—	
23	Jorge Guarnieri	Argentina	60	49	109	—	
23	Zoran Novaković	Bosnia and Herzegovina	63	46	109	—	
23	Frans Swart	South Africa	65	44	109	—	
26	Peter Boden	Great Britain	63	45	108	—	
26	Francisco Boza	Peru	64	44	108	—	
26	João Rebelo	Portugal	65	43	108	—	
26	Anwer Sultan	India	63	45	108	—	
30	Stéphane Clamens	France	62	45	107	—	
30	Oğuzhan Tüzün	Turkey	66	41	107	—	
32	Francesco Amici	San Marino	63	43	106	—	
32	Jiří Gach	Czech Republic	61	45	106	—	
32	Sergey Lyubomirov	Russia	61	45	106	—	
32	Andraž Lipolt	Slovenia	63	43	106	—	
32	Francis Pace	Malta	60	46	106	—	
37	Brant Woodward	New Zealand	59	46	105	—	
38	Victor Shaw	New Zealand	62	40	102	—	
39	Joe Salem	Lebanon	58	43	101	—	
39	Joan Tomas	Andorra	58	43	101	—	
41	João Paulo de Silva	Angola	60	39	99	—	

=== Final ===
Rank	Shooter	Nation	Qual	Final	Total	Shoot-off
1st place, gold medalist(s)	Michael Diamond	Australia	122	25	147	—
2nd place, silver medalist(s)	Ian Peel	Great Britain	118	24	142	—
3rd place, bronze medalist(s)	Giovanni Pellielo	Italy	116	24	140	—
4	Khaled Al-Mudhaf	Kuwait	115	24	139	—
5	Marco Venturini	Italy	115	23	138	5
6	David Kostelecký	Czech Republic	116	22	138	4

== Sources ==
- Official Report of the XXVII Olympiad — Shooting (PDF).
