= Ignacio Gili =

Argentine cyclist

Personal information
- Born: 30 June 1971 (age 55)

Cycling career
- Sport: Cycling

Ignacio Gili (born 30 June 1971) is an Argentine cyclist. He competed in the men's cross-country mountain biking event at the 2000 Summer Olympics.
