= Rebecca Sullivan =

Australian Olympic judoka

Personal information
- Born: 11 September 1972 (age 53) Mount Isa, Queensland, Australia

Sport
- Country: Australia
- Sport: Judo

Rebecca Sullivan (born 11 September 1972) is an Australian former judoka who competed in the 2000 Summer Olympics. She was Australian Judo Champion on four occasions.

Sullivan's sister, Lara, is also a national champion.

== Career ==
Between 1997 and 1999, Sullivan was the Australian national champion in her weight division. She ranked seventh in the 1999 US Open.

In October 1999, she competed at the world championships in England, placing ninth and just missed out on automatic selection for the Sydney Olympic Games team. She came second to Angela Raguz in the 2000 Oceania Judo Union titles.

=== Olympic Games ===
In August 2000, prior to the release of the team selected for the Games, it was reported that Sullivan had lodged an appeal against the Judo Federation of Australia through the Court of Arbitration for Sport, against her non-selection. There was only one position available in the division, (women's half lightweight under-52 kilograms) and Angela Raguz had been selected despite Sullivan's ranking as first in Australia and ninth in the world. The court ruled in Sullivan's favour, finding that she should have been awarded different points using the correct points table at the world championships, which then secured her the spot in the Games team. Later that month, Raguz challenged the appeal through the NSW Supreme Court to challenge the previous decision, but the application was dismissed, with Sullivan's inclusion in the squad being announced the following day. The implications of the case were later discussed in the Melbourne Journal of International Law.

At the Games, Sullivan defeated Laetitia Tignola but later lost to both Kye Sun-hui and Deborah Gravenstijn.
