= Robert Woods (cyclist) =

Australian cyclist

Personal information
- Born: 5 March 1968 (age 58) Sydney, Australia

Cycling career
- Sport: Cycling

Robert Woods (born 5 March 1968) is an Australian cyclist. He competed in Mountain Bike Men's Cross-country at the 1996 Summer Olympics and the 2000 Summer Olympics.

He placed 16th in the 1996 cross-county mountain bike Olympics and 13th in the 2000 cross-county mountain bike Olympics.

His brother was 4 time Olympic medalist, Dean Woods.
