= Yeti Cycles =

American bicycle manufacturer

- Industry: Sports equipment
- Founded: 1985; 41 years ago
- Founder: John Parker
- Fate: Acquired by Schwinn in 1995; then by Volant (1999), Chris Conroy and Steve Hoogendoorn (2001)
- Headquarters: Golden, CO, United States
- Products: Bicycles
- Brands: ZeroLoss Technology (patented); Switch Technology (patented)
- Website: yeticycles.com

Yeti Cycles is an American bicycle manufacturer located in Golden, Colorado.

== Early history ==
Yeti Cycles was founded in 1985 by John Parker and several partners in California, when mountain biking was gaining in popularity. Parker was a welder who built movie sets in Hollywood and later became a mountain bike designer and racer. Becoming one of the sport's guardians, he was inducted into the Mountain Bike Hall of Fame in 1997, and a trustee of NORBA Board of Directors for five years.

The first mountain bike World Championships took place in Durango, Colorado in 1990 and the next year Parker moved the Yeti Cycles factory from California to Durango to be closer to the action. The company made a range of mountain bikes but was best known at the time for its iconic turquoise-colored FRO (For Racing Only) models.

Early sponsored riders included John Tomac, and Juli Furtado.

In 1995, Schwinn bought Yeti Cycles company and later sold it to ski company Volant in 1999 (now part of Amer Sports).

== Revival ==
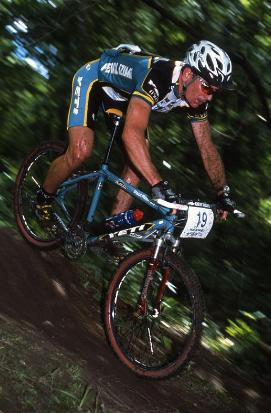
Paul Rowney riding for Yeti in 2010

In 2001, two Yeti employees, Steve Hoogendoorn and Chris Conroy, bought the company. Conroy is the president, and Hoogendoorn is the vice president. Yeti Cycles' headquarters is now located in Golden, Colorado.

=== Designs and models ===
Yeti Cycles competed in downhill mountain bike racing with the successful Lawwill DH-9 full-suspension downhill bike, developed by former motorcycle champion, Mert Lawwill. Yeti also used a patented suspension system called ZeroLoss Technology, also referred to as linear guide technology. The system used two gliding pivots and was intended to direct impact forces into the rear shock rather than through frame flex.

Yeti later developed Switch Technology, a dual-link suspension design using an eccentric mechanism that changes direction as the bike moves through its travel. This design was used on early SB-series models, including the SB66, SB75 and SB95.

In 2014, Yeti introduced Switch Infinity, a refinement of Switch Technology developed with Fox Racing Shox. The design uses a translating pivot intended to influence axle path and suspension characteristics. Switch Infinity has been used on a range of Yeti full-suspension models, including the SB5, SB4.5, SB5.5, SB6, SB100, SB115, SB120, SB130, SB135, SB140, SB150, SB160 and SB165.

Yeti has also used other suspension designs for specific model families. The ASR cross-country bike uses a flex-stay suspension design rather than Switch Infinity. Yeti's electric mountain bikes use Sixfinity, a six-bar suspension platform developed for the different weight, power delivery and suspension requirements of eMTBs.

As of 2026, Yeti's current model range includes the ARC hardtail, ASR, ASR 40th, SB120, SB135, SB140, SB160, SB165, MTe and LTe. The MTe is a lightweight eMTB with 145 mm of rear travel, while the LTe is a full-power eMTB with 160 mm of rear travel. Both models use Yeti's Sixfinity suspension platform. The 160E, introduced in 2021, was Yeti's first production eMTB and used Sixfinity suspension with 160 mm of rear travel, 29-inch wheels and a Shimano EP8 drive system. It has since moved into Yeti's past-season model archive.

Earlier and discontinued Yeti models include the FRO, Lawwill DH-9, 303, 575, SB66, SB75, SB95, SB5, SB4.5, SB5.5, SB6, SB100, SB115, SB130, SB140 27.5, SB150, SB165 27.5 and 160E. Some model names, including ARC and ASR, have been used across different generations of Yeti bikes.

Women-specific bikes were introduced in 2015. Yeti "Beti" catered to women with smaller sized frames and lower standover height. These models were discontinued after the 2019 season.

=== Race programmes ===
Yeti's factory race programme is conducted through the Yeti / FOX Factory Team. The programme has a strong downhill focus while continuing to compete in enduro. The team was also listed as a 2026 World Series team in the Gravity category. Although Yeti's main factory programme is gravity-focused, the ASR has also appeared in high-level cross-country and marathon competition.
