= Ken Muhindi =

Kenyan cyclist

Personal information
- Full name: Samuel Kenneth Muhindi
- Born: 12 June 1978 (age 46)

Samuel Kenneth Muhindi (born 12 June 1978) is a Kenyan cyclist. He competed in the men's cross-country mountain biking event at the 2000 Summer Olympics.
