= Tennis at the 2000 Summer Olympics – Men's singles =

Men's singles
- Tennis at the 2000 Summer Olympics

Final
- Champion: (Russia) Yevgeny Kafelnikov
- Runner-up: (Germany) Tommy Haas
- Score: 7–6^{(7–4)}, 3–6, 6–2, 4–6, 6–3

Events
Singles	men	women
Doubles	men	women
- Summer Olympics

Men's singles tennis at the Games of the XXVII Olympiad
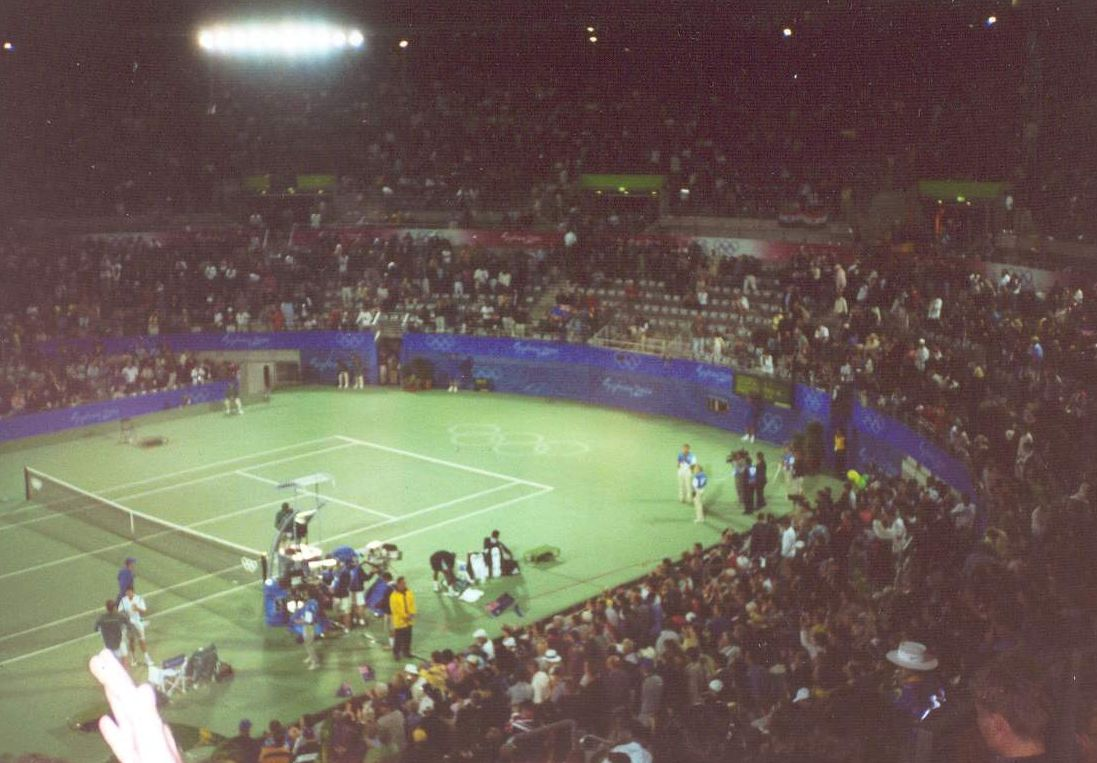
- Tennis at the 2000 Olympics
- Venue: NSW Tennis Centre, Sydney
- Dates: 19–28 September 2000
- Competitors: 64 from 32 nations

Medalists
1st place, gold medalist(s)		Yevgeny Kafelnikov; Russia
2nd place, silver medalist(s)		Tommy Haas; Germany
3rd place, bronze medalist(s)		Arnaud Di Pasquale; France

Russia's Yevgeny Kafelnikov defeated Germany's Tommy Haas in the final, 7–6^{(7–4)}, 3–6, 6–2, 4–6, 6–3 to win the gold medal in men's singles tennis at the 2000 Summer Olympics. In the bronze-medal match, France's Arnaud Di Pasquale defeated Switzerland's Roger Federer, 7–6^{(7–5)}, 6–7^{(7–9)}, 6–3. It was Russia's first medal in the event as an independent country (though Russian player Andrei Cherkasov had taken bronze as part of the Unified Team in 1992). France and Germany won their first medals in the event since 1924 and 1912, respectively.

The tournament was played at the Tennis Centre, Sydney Olympic Park, in Sydney, Australia. There were 64 players from 32 nations. Nations were able to enter up to four players each, up from three in prior Games.

The United States' Andre Agassi was the reigning gold medalist from 1996, but he did not participate.

== Background ==
This was the 11th (medal) appearance of the men's singles tennis event. The event has been held at every Summer Olympics where tennis has been on the program: from 1896 to 1924 and then from 1988 to the current program. Demonstration events were held in 1968 and 1984.

The number one seed was Marat Safin of Russia, with Americans Pete Sampras and Andre Agassi (the defending champion) not playing in the Games. Two of the eight quarterfinalists from the 1996 tournament returned: bronze medalist Leander Paes of India and quarterfinal loser Wayne Ferreira of South Africa.

Benin, Belarus, Bolivia, Costa Rica, and Thailand each made their debut in the event. France made its 10th appearance, most among all nations, having missed only the 1904 event.

== Competition format ==
The competition was a single-elimination tournament with a bronze-medal match. Matches before the final were best-of-three sets, with the final being best-of-five sets. The 12-point tie-breaker was used in any set, except the third (or the fifth in the final), that reached 6–6.

== Schedule ==
All times are Australian Eastern Standard Time (UTC+10)

Date	Time	Round
Tuesday, 19 September 2000; Wednesday, 20 September 2000	11:00	Round of 64
Thursday, 21 September 2000; Friday, 22 September 2000	11:00	Round of 32
Saturday, 23 September 2000; Sunday, 24 September 2000	11:45	Round of 16
Tuesday, 25 September 2000	11:00	Quarterfinals
Thursday, 26 September 2000	11:00	Semifinals
Friday, 27 September 2000	11:00	Bronze medal match
Saturday, 28 September 2000	13:00	Final

== Seeds ==
1. Marat Safin (RUS) (first round)
2. Gustavo Kuerten (BRA) (quarterfinals)
3. Magnus Norman (SWE) (third round)
4. Lleyton Hewitt (AUS) (first round)
5. Yevgeny Kafelnikov (RUS) (champion, gold medalist)
6. Àlex Corretja (ESP) (third round)
7. Tim Henman (GBR) (first round)
8. Juan Carlos Ferrero (ESP) (quarterfinals)
9. Nicolas Kiefer (GER) (first round)
10. Franco Squillari (ARG) (first round)
11. Mark Philippoussis (AUS) (third round)
12. Marcelo Ríos (CHI) (first round)
13. Patrick Rafter (AUS) (second round)
14. Wayne Ferreira (RSA) (first round)
15. Albert Costa (ESP) (first round)
16. Michael Chang (USA) (first round)

== Draw ==
=== Key ===
- INV = Tripartite invitation
- IP = ITF place
- Alt = Alternate
- r = Retired
- w/o = Walkover

=== Finals ===
Quarterfinals
Karim Alami (MAR)	6^{2}	1
Roger Federer (SUI)	7^{7}	6
Max Mirnyi (BLR)	6	5	3
Tommy Haas (GER)	4	7	6
8	Juan Carlos Ferrero (ESP)	2	1
Arnaud Di Pasquale (FRA)	6	6
5	Yevgeny Kafelnikov (RUS)	6	7
2	Gustavo Kuerten (BRA)	4	5

Semifinals
Roger Federer (SUI)	3	2
Tommy Haas (GER)	6	6
Arnaud Di Pasquale (FRA)	4	4
5	Yevgeny Kafelnikov (RUS)	6	6

Final (gold Medal match)
Tommy Haas (GER)	6^{4}	6	2	6	3
5	Yevgeny Kafelnikov (RUS)	7^{7}	3	6	4	6
Bronze Medal match
Roger Federer (SUI)	6^{5}	7^{9}	3
Arnaud Di Pasquale (FRA)	7^{7}	6^{7}	6

=== Top half ===
==== Section 1 ====
First round
1	M Safin (RUS)	6	1	4
F Santoro (FRA)	1	6	6
A Ilie (AUS)	3	3
F Vicente (ESP)	6	6
G Pozzi (ITA)	6	6
J Novák (CZE)	1	2
K Alami (MAR)	6	7^{7}
10	F Squillari (ARG)	4	6^{5}
16	M Chang (USA)	6^{6}	3
IP	S Lareau (CAN)	7^{8}	6
Alt	M Tillström (SWE)	6	6
IP	L Paes (IND)	2	4
D Prinosil (GER)	2	2
R Federer (SUI)	6	6
K Kučera (SVK)	6	6
7	T Henman (GBR)	3	2

Second round
F Santoro (FRA)	6	6^{2}	7
F Vicente (ESP)	1	7^{7}	5
G Pozzi (ITA)	2	6	6
K Alami (MAR)	6	4	8
IP	S Lareau (CAN)	1	6	3
Alt	M Tillström (SWE)	6	3	6
R Federer (SUI)	6	7^{7}
K Kučera (SVK)	4	6^{5}

Third round
F Santoro (FRA)	2	7	4
K Alami (MAR)	6	5	6
Alt	M Tillström (SWE)	1	2
R Federer (SUI)	6	6

Quarterfinals
K Alami (MAR)	6^{2}	1
R Federer (SUI)	7^{7}	6

==== Section 2 ====
First round
4	L Hewitt (AUS)	3	3
M Mirnyi (BLR)	6	6
Alt	W Black (ZIM)	7	1	1
J Vaněk (CZE)	5	6	6
J Tarango (USA)	6	6
INV	D Camacho (BOL)	0	1
M Zabaleta (ARG)	6^{8}	6	7
12	M Ríos (CHI)	7^{10}	4	5
14	W Ferreira (RSA)	5	2
T Haas (GER)	7	6
C Ruud (NOR)	2	4
A Vinciguerra (SWE)	6	6
G Rusedski (GBR)	2	3
A Clément (FRA)	6	6
G Ivanišević (CRO)	6^{3}	6^{5}
6	À Corretja (ESP)	7^{7}	7^{7}

Second round
M Mirnyi (BLR)	6^{4}	6	11
J Vaněk (CZE)	7^{7}	4	9
J Tarango (USA)	2	3
M Zabaleta (ARG)	6	6
T Haas (GER)	4	6	6
A Vinciguerra (SWE)	6	4	2
A Clément (FRA)	7^{7}	4	4
6	À Corretja (ESP)	6^{5}	6	6

Third round
M Mirnyi (BLR)	7^{7}	6
M Zabaleta (ARG)	6^{4}	2
T Haas (GER)	7^{9}	6
6	À Corretja (ESP)	6^{7}	3

Quarterfinals
M Mirnyi (BLR)	6	5	3
T Haas (GER)	4	7	6

=== Bottom half ===
==== Section 3 ====
First round
8	JC Ferrero (ESP)	6^{5}	7^{8}	7
Alt	H-T Lee (KOR)	7^{7}	6^{6}	5
S Doseděl (CZE)	2	6^{5}
N Massú (CHI)	6	7^{7}
Alt	B Cowan (GBR)	7	1	4
Alt	D Nestor (CAN)	5	6	6
V Spadea (USA)	4	3
13	P Rafter (AUS)	6	6
9	N Kiefer (GER)	4	3
A Di Pasquale (FRA)	6	6
V Voltchkov (BLR)	7^{7}	4	6
G Gaudio (ARG)	6^{4}	6	1
IP	P Srichaphan (THA)	6	4	7
IP	A Sávolt (HUN)	2	6	5
A Pavel (ROM)	7^{7}	3	8
3	M Norman (SWE)	6^{1}	6	10

Second round
8	JC Ferrero (ESP)	6	7^{8}
N Massú (CHI)	4	6^{6}
Alt	D Nestor (CAN)	7	7^{7}
13	P Rafter (AUS)	5	6^{4}
A Di Pasquale (FRA)	6	6
V Voltchkov (BLR)	2	2
IP	P Srichaphan (THA)	5	2
3	M Norman (SWE)	7	6

Third round
8	JC Ferrero (ESP)	7^{7}	6
Alt	D Nestor (CAN)	6^{4}	3
A Di Pasquale (FRA)	7^{7}	7^{7}
3	M Norman (SWE)	6^{4}	6^{2}

Quarterfinals
8	JC Ferrero (ESP)	2	1
A Di Pasquale (FRA)	6	6

==== Section 4 ====
First round
5	Y Kafelnikov (RUS)	6	6
IP	JA Marín (CRC)	0	1
N Escudé (FRA)	7^{7}	5	1
JI Chela (ARG)	6^{5}	7	6
S Sargsian (ARM)	3	4
IP	K Pless (DEN)	6	6
T Johansson (SWE)	6^{6}	4
11	M Philippoussis (AUS)	7^{8}	6
15	A Costa (ESP)	3	6	9
Alt	K Ullyett (ZIM)	6	3	11
D Hrbatý (SVK)	1	6	3
I Ljubičić (CRO)	6	1	6
R Schüttler (GER)	6	6
T Martin (USA)	2	0
INV	C Pognon (BEN)	1	1
2	G Kuerten (BRA)	6	6

Second round
5	Y Kafelnikov (RUS)	7^{7}	6
JI Chela (ARG)	6^{4}	4
IP	K Pless (DEN)	4	4
11	M Philippoussis (AUS)	6	6
Alt	K Ullyett (ZIM)	2	6	4
I Ljubičić (CRO)	6	4	6
R Schüttler (GER)	4	4
2	G Kuerten (BRA)	6	6

Third round
5	Y Kafelnikov (RUS)	7^{7}	6
11	M Philippoussis (AUS)	6^{4}	3
I Ljubičić (CRO)	6^{2}	3
2	G Kuerten (BRA)	7^{7}	6

Quarterfinals
5	Y Kafelnikov (RUS)	6	7
2	G Kuerten (BRA)	4	5
