= Judo at the 2003 Games of the Small States of Europe =

Judo competition

Judo Judo at the 2003 Games of the Small States of Europe
- Location: Valletta, Malta
- Dates: 4–6 June 2003

Competition at external databases
- Links: JudoInside

== Men's events ==
Event	Gold	Silver	Bronze
Extra-lightweight (60 kg)	Theodoros Mandrites (CYP)	Hoskuldur Einarsson (ISL)	Reuben Micallef (MLT)
Half-lightweight (66 kg)	Constantinos Kouyialis (CYP)	Murman Korchilava (MLT)	Matthieu Bertrand (MON)
Half-lightweight (66 kg)	Constantinos Kouyialis (CYP)	Murman Korchilava (MLT)	Georges Morbe (LUX)
Lightweight (73 kg)	Christodoulos Christodoulides (CYP)	Jerome Torzuoli (MON)	Snaevar Jonsson (ISL)
Half-middleweight (81 kg)	Thierry Vatrican (MON)	Charles STELMES (LUX)	Marios Anderov (CYP)
Half-middleweight (81 kg)	Thierry Vatrican (MON)	Charles STELMES (LUX)	Vignir Stefansson (ISL)
Middleweight (90 kg)			
Half-heavyweight (100 kg)	Bjarni Skulason (ISL)	Jerome Veison (MON)	
Heavyweight (+100 kg)	Heimir Heraldsson (ISL)	Schadler Maik (LIE)	

== Women's events ==
Event	Gold	Silver	Bronze
Under 48kg	Ulrike Kaiser (LIE)	Michelle Grech (MLT)	Pénélope Popi Stavrinou (CYP)
Under 52kg	Maria Carmen Fernández (AND)	Stephanie Wax (MON)	Hjordis Erna Olafsdottir (ISL)
Under 52kg	Maria Carmen Fernández (AND)	Stephanie Wax (MON)	Marcon Bezzina (MLT)
Under 63kg	Despina Panayiotou (CYP)	Margret Bjarnadottir (ISL)	Solveig Jacquemont (MON)
Over 63kg	Nicole Dostert (LUX)	Jessica Zannoni (SMR)	Helen Portelli (MLT)

== Team events ==
Event	Gold	Silver	Bronze
Men's Team (Under 100 kg)	Cyprus	Andorra	Iceland
Men's Team (Under 81 kg)	Cyprus	Andorra	Iceland
Men's Team (Under 66 kg)	Cyprus	Andorra	Iceland
Women's Team (Under 78 kg)	Iceland	Malta	Cyprus
Women's Team (Under 63 kg)	Iceland	Malta	Cyprus
Women's Team (Under 52 kg)	Iceland	Malta	Cyprus
