= Miren León =

Spanish Olympic judoka

Miren León Ruiz (born 7 June 1975) is a Spanish former judoka who competed in the 2000 Summer Olympics.

== Results ==
Result table
Date	Result	Judo Event	Comp.	Cat.
27-Jan-2008	3	Spanish Championships Madrid	NC	U52
17-Feb-2007	5	World Cup Vienna	WCup	U52
21-Jan-2007	2	Spanish Championships Malaga	NC	U52
24-Jan-2004	2	Spanish Championships Madrid	NC	U52
22-Mar-2003	5	A-Tournament Dutch Open Rotterdam	WCup	U52
21-Apr-2002	3	British Open Burgess Hill	IT	U57
24-Mar-2002	3	Grand Prix Città di Roma	WCup	U52
10-Mar-2002	2	A-Tournament Prague	WCup	U52
23-Feb-2002	7	German World Open Wuppertal	SWC	U52
26-Jan-2002	2	Spanish Championships Madrid	NC	U52
24-Nov-2001	2	Grand Prix Sevilla	SWC	U52
31-Mar-2001	3	Dutch Open Grand Prix Rotterdam	WCup	U52
24-Mar-2001	5	Grand Prix Città di Roma	WCup	U52
10-Feb-2001	5	Tournoi de Paris	WCup	U52
27-Jan-2001	1	Spanish Championships Vigo	NC	U52
17-Sep-2000	7	Olympic Games Sydney	OG	U52
01-Apr-2000	2	Dutch Open Grand Prix Rotterdam	WCup	U52
25-Mar-2000	5	Grand Prix Città di Roma	WCup	U52
19-Mar-2000	2	Polish Open Warsaw	WCup	U52
22-Jan-2000	2	Moscow International Tournament	WCup	U52
02-Dec-1999	3	Sydney Challenge Olympic Test Event	IT	U52
23-Oct-1999	2	European Team Championships Istanbul	ETC	U52
23-May-1999	7	European Championships Bratislava	ECh	U52
21-Mar-1999	1	Polish Open Warsaw	WCup	U52
30-Jan-1999	1	Spanish Championships Alcala de Henares	NC	U52
18-Dec-1998	1	World University Championships Prague	WUC	U52
17-Oct-1998	3	European Team Championships Villach	ETC	U52
11-Apr-1998	3	British Open Birmingham	IT	U52
08-Mar-1998	7	Czech Cup Prague	WCup	U52
08-Feb-1998	5	Tournoi de Paris	WCup	U52
24-Jan-1998	1	Spanish Championships Alcala de Henares	NC	U52
19-Mar-1994	3	Belgian Open juniors Arlon	ITJun	U52
22-Nov-1993	1	European Junior Championships Arnhem	EChJun	U48
04-Apr-1993	3	Spanish Championships Frdo. Hres.	NC	U48
15-Mar-1992	3	Belgian Open juniors Arlon	ITJun	U52
15-Mar-1992	3	Belgian Open Arlon	IT	U52

Miren Leon (Spain)
