= Rok Drašler =

Slovenian cyclist

Personal information
- Born: 26 May 1979 (age 47) Ljubljana, Yugoslavia

Cycling career
- Sport: Cycling

Rok Drašler (born 26 May 1979) is a Slovenian cyclist. He competed in the men's cross-country mountain biking event at the 2000 Summer Olympics.
