= Jesper Agergård =

Danish cyclist

Personal information
- Full name: Jesper Agergård Jensen
- Nationality: Denmark
- Born: 18 February 1975 (age 51)
- Height: 1.80 m (5 ft 11 in)
- Weight: 69 kg (152 lb)

Sport
- Sport: Cycling

Jesper Agergård (born 18 February 1975) is a Danish cyclist. He competed in the 2000 Summer Olympics.
