= Jang Jae-sim =

South Korean judoka (born 1980)

Jang Jae-Sim (born 3 January 1980) is a retired Korean judoka who competed in the 2000 Summer Olympics.
