= Primož Štrancar =

Slovenian cyclist

Personal information
- Born: 16 September 1972 (age 54) Ajdovščina, Yugoslavia

Cycling career
- Sport: Cycling

Primož Štrancar (born 16 September 1972) is a Slovenian cyclist. He competed in the men's cross-country mountain biking event at the 2000 Summer Olympics.
