= Liesbet Dreesen =

Belgian swimmer (born 1976)

Personal information
- Born: 7 November 1976 (age 49) Uccle, Belgium
- Height: 1.75 m (5 ft 9 in)
- Weight: 57 kg (126 lb)

Sport
- Club: Wemmel ZV
Medal record
Women's swimming
Representing Belgium
European Championships
Bronze medal – third place	2000 Helsinki	4×100 m freestyle relay

Liesbet Dreesen (born 7 November 1976) is a retired Belgian freestyle swimmer. She won a bronze medal in the 4 × 100 m freestyle relay at the 2000 European Aquatics Championships and participated in the 2000 Summer Olympics in two events, but did not reach the finals.

Between 1996 and 2000, Dreesen won four national titles in the 50 m freestyle, and also competed in open water swimming. In 2000, she set a national records in the 50 m freestyle that stood until 2007. She retired from competitions in February 2001 to work as sportsteacher.
