= Inge Clement =

Belgian judoka

Personal information
- Nationality: Belgian
- Born: 26 June 1977 (age 49) Ostend, Belgium
- Occupation: Judoka

Sport
- Sport: Judo

Profile at external databases
- JudoInside.com: 151

Inge Clement (born 26 June 1977) is a Belgian judoka. She competed in the women's half-lightweight event at the 2000 Summer Olympics.
