= Arijana Jaha =

Bosnia and Herzegovina judoka

Personal information
- Nationality: Bosnian
- Born: 5 January 1979 (age 47)

Sport
- Sport: Judo

Arijana Jaha (born 5 January 1979) is a Bosnian judoka. She competed in the women's half-lightweight event at the 2000 Summer Olympics.

== Personal life ==
Born in Sarajevo, she is of Albanian descent.
