= Ulrike Kaiser =

Liechtenstein judoka (born 1978)

Personal information
- Born: 10 January 1978 (age 48) Grabs, Switzerland
- Occupation: Judoka

Sport
- Country: Liechtenstein
- Sport: Judo
- Weight class: ‍–‍52 kg

Achievements and titles
- Olympic Games: R16 (2000)
- European Champ.: R16 (2002, 2004)
Medal record
Women's judo
Representing Liechtenstein
Games of the Small States of Europe
Gold medal – first place	1999 Liechtenstein	‍–‍52 kg
Gold medal – first place	2001 San Marino	‍–‍52 kg
Gold medal – first place	2003 Valletta	‍–‍52 kg
Gold medal – first place	2005 Andorra	‍–‍52 kg

Profile at external databases
- IJF: 53106
- JudoInside.com: 7792
- Updated on 2 April 2025

Ulrike Kaiser (born 10 January 1978) is a Liechtenstein judoka. She competed in the women's half-lightweight event at the 2000 Summer Olympics.
