= Andraž Lipolt =

Slovenian sports shooter

Personal information
- Nationality: Slovenian
- Born: 24 April 1974 (age 50); Ljubljana, Yugoslavia

Sport
- Sport: Sports shooting

Andraž Lipolt (born 24 April 1974) is a Slovenian sports shooter. He competed in the men's trap event at the 2000 Summer Olympics.
