= Jackelin Díaz =

Venezuelan judoka (born 1978)

Jackelin Díaz (born 14 May 1978) is a retired Venezuelan judoka who competed in the 2000 Summer Olympics.
