= Tennis at the 2000 Summer Olympics =

- Date: 19-28 September 2000
- Edition: 13
- Surface: Hard (Rebound Ace)
- Location: NSW Tennis Centre, Sydney

Champions

Men's singles
- Yevgeny Kafelnikov; Russia

Women's singles
- Venus Williams; United States

Men's doubles
- Sébastien Lareau / Daniel Nestor; Canada

Women's doubles
- Serena Williams / Venus Williams; United States
- Summer Olympics

Tennis was one of the 28 sports that was held at the 2000 Summer Olympics in Sydney, Australia. The competition which was held from 19-28 September at the NSW Tennis Centre, saw four gold medals being contested with them being in the singles and doubles of both sexes.

The format at the 2000 Olympics was a single-elimination tournament with the men's and women's singles being 64 players. They competed in six rounds of competition in the singles and five rounds in the doubles (sizes of 32). The format consisted of three set matches with five set matches being only played in the men's singles and doubles final.

The United States finished on top of the medal table with two gold medals as Venus Williams won both the women's singles and doubles with Serena Williams. In the men's events, Yevgeny Kafelnikov from Russia secured the men's singles title while Canadian pair, Sébastien Lareau and Daniel Nestor took the men's doubles.

== Medal summary ==
=== Events ===
Event	Gold	Silver	Bronze
Men's singles	Yevgeny Kafelnikov; Russia	Tommy Haas; Germany	Arnaud Di Pasquale; France
Men's doubles	Canada; Sébastien Lareau; Daniel Nestor	Australia; Todd Woodbridge; Mark Woodforde	Spain; Àlex Corretja; Albert Costa
Women's singles	Venus Williams; United States	Elena Dementieva; Russia	Monica Seles; United States
Women's doubles	United States; Venus Williams; Serena Williams	Netherlands; Kristie Boogert; Miriam Oremans	Belgium; Els Callens; Dominique Van Roost

=== Medal table ===
* Host nation (Australia)

Rank	Nation	Gold	Silver	Bronze	Total
1	United States	2	0	1	3
2	Russia	1	1	0	2
3	Canada	1	0	0	1
4	Australia*	0	1	0	1
4	Germany	0	1	0	1
4	Netherlands	0	1	0	1
7	Belgium	0	0	1	1
7	France	0	0	1	1
7	Spain	0	0	1	1
Totals (9 entries)		4	4	4	12
