= Laetitia Tignola =

French judoka (born 1972)

Personal information
- Born: 25 August 1972 (age 54)
- Occupation: Judoka

Sport
- Country: France
- Sport: Judo
- Weight class: ‍–‍52 kg

Achievements and titles
- Olympic Games: R16 (2000)
- European Champ.: (gold) (2000)
Medal record
Women's judo
Representing France
European Championships
| Gold medal – first place | 2000 Wrocław | ‍–‍52 kg |
| Bronze medal – third place | 2001 Paris | ‍–‍52 kg |

Profile at external databases
- IJF: 53099
- JudoInside.com: 395
- Updated on 15 March 2025

Laetitia Tignola (born 25 August 1972) is a French former judoka who competed in the 2000 Summer Olympics.
