= Noriko Narazaki =

Japanese judoka (born 1972)

Personal information
- Born: 27 September 1972 (age 53)
- Occupation: Judoka

Sport
- Country: Japan
- Sport: Judo
- Weight class: –52 kg

Achievements and titles
- Olympic Games: (silver) (2000)
- World Champ.: (1999)
- Asian Champ.: (silver) (1994)
Medal record
Women's judo
Representing Japan
Olympic Games
Silver medal – second place	2000 Sydney	‍–‍52 kg
Bronze medal – third place	1996 Atlanta	‍–‍52 kg
World Championships
Gold medal – first place	1999 Birmingham	‍–‍52 kg
Asian Games
Silver medal – second place	1994 Hiroshima	‍–‍56 kg
World Juniors Championships
Silver medal – second place	1990 Dijon	‍–‍52 kg

Profile at external databases
- IJF: 53103
- JudoInside.com: 7806
- Updated on 1 June 2023

Noriko Narazaki (楢崎 教子, Narazaki Noriko; née Sugawara Sugawara (菅原); born on 27 September 1972 in Yamato, Kanagawa, Japan) is a retired Japanese judoka.

== Biography ==
Narazaki competed at the 1996 Summer Olympics, winning a bronze medal in the half-lightweight division.

Narazaki returned to competitive judo in 1999, winning a gold medal at the 1999 World Championships. At the 2000 Summer Olympics, she became the first married Japanese judoka to compete in the Olympics, finishing with a silver medal. She retired after the 2000 Summer Olympics and began teaching at Bunkyo University in April, 2001.

== See also ==
- List of judoka
- List of Olympic medalists in judo
