= Lourembam Brojeshori Devi =

Indian judoka (1981–2013)

Lourembam Brojeshori Devi (1 January 1981 – 21 July 2013) was an Indian judoka who competed in the 2000 Summer Olympics in Sydney.

Brojeshori Devi was born on 1 January 1981. She was from Khagempalli Huidrom Leikai in Imphal West of Manipur. She was the daughter of Lourembam Manglem Singh and Lorembam Ongbi Taruni Devi.

Brojeshori had participated in 20 international and 16 national judo championships. She won three gold medals at the international level apart from one silver and three bronzes. She had participated in the Women's Half-Lightweight category in the 2000 Olympic Games and reached the Quarter-Finals against Liu Yuxiang of China.

== Death ==
Brojeshori died on 21 July 2013 in Coimbatore, Tamil Nadu, India due to pregnancy complications.
