= Nina van Koeckhoven =

Belgian swimmer (born 1983)

Personal information
- Born: 6 October 1983 (age 42) Ghent, Belgium
- Height: 1.76 m (5 ft 9 in)
- Weight: 65 kg (143 lb)
Medal record
Women's swimming
Representing Belgium
European Championships
Silver medal – second place	2000 Helsinki	4×100 m medley relay
Bronze medal – third place	2000 Helsinki	4×100 m freestyle relay

Nina van Koeckhoven (born 6 October 1983) is a Belgian freestyle swimmer and triathlete. She won two medals at the 2000 European Aquatics Championships and participated in the 2000 Summer Olympics in four events, but did not reach the finals.

Van Koeckhoven was born in Ghent but later moved to Zelzate. In 1991, she started swimming in a club. Her first international success was a bronze medal in the 200 m freestyle at the 1997 European Youth Olympic Festival in Lisbon. Next year she won two more bronze medals, in the 100 m and 200 m freestyle at the European Junior Swimming Championships. From 1999 she competed in regular competitions and reached the finals at the 1999 European Aquatics Championships, again in the 200 m freestyle. Her best results came in 2000 when she won two European medals and passed the Olympic selection.

In 2001, she won one more bronze medal, at the FINA Swimming World Cup in Paris, and set a national record in the 200 m freestyle (2'00"90) that stood for at least 10 years. However, the same year she had serious food poisoning from which she could not fully recover. In January 2012, having won 10 national titles she retired from competitive swimming. She works as criminologist with the Belgian police and competes in triathlon (since 2010).
