= Algeria national boxing team =

The Algeria national boxing team represents Algeria at the international boxing competitions such as Olympic Games or World Boxing Championships.

== Medal count ==
| Competition | Medal table | | | | |
| Competition | 1st place, gold medalist(s) | 2nd place, silver medalist(s) | 3rd place, bronze medalist(s) | Tot. | Rank |
|---|---|---|---|---|---|
| Summer Olympics | 2 | 0 | 5 | 7 | 30 |
| World Championships (Men's) | 0 | 2 | 2 | 4 | 40 |
| World Championships (Women's) | 0 | 1 | 1 | 2 | 42 |
| World Combat Games | 0 | 0 | 3 | 3 | ? |
| Mediterranean Games | 22 | 19 | 26 | 67 | 4 |
| African Games | 21 | 18 | 13 | 52 | 1 |
| African Championships (2014-2024) | 47 | 33 | 26 | 106 | 1 |
| Total | 92 | 73 | 76 | 241 | − |

== List of medalists at Olympic Games ==
| Medal | Name | Games | Event | Date |
|---|---|---|---|---|
| Bronze | Mustapha Moussa | 1984 Los Angeles | Men's light-heavyweight | 9 August 1984 |
| Bronze | Mohamed Zaoui | 1984 Los Angeles | Men's middleweight | 9 August 1984 |
| Bronze | Hocine Soltani | 1992 Barcelona | Men's featherweight | 7 August 1992 |
| Bronze | Mohamed Bahari | 1996 Atlanta | Men's middleweight | 1 August 1996 |
| Gold | Hocine Soltani | 1996 Atlanta | Men's lightweight | 4 August 1996 |
| Bronze | Mohamed Allalou | 2000 Sydney | Men's light-welterweight | 29 September 2000 |
| Gold | Imane Khelif | 2024 Paris | Women's 66 kg | 9 August 2024 |

== List of medalists at World Championships ==
=== Men's ===
| Medal | Name | Games | Event | Date |
|---|---|---|---|---|
| Bronze | Hocine Soltani | (Australia) 1991 Sydney | Men's Featherweight | 21 November 1991 |
| Silver | Noureddine Medjehoud | (Germany) 1995 Berlin | Men's Featherweight | 15 May 1995 |
| Silver | Mohamed Flissi | (Kazakhstan) 2013 Almaty | Men's Light flyweight | 26 October 2013 |
| Bronze | Mohamed Flissi | (Qatar) 2015 Doha | Men's Flyweight | 13 October 2015 |

=== Women's ===
| Medal | Name | Games | Event | Date |
|---|---|---|---|---|
| Silver | Imane Khelif | (Turkey) 2022 Istanbul | Women's Light welterweight | 19 May 2022 |
| Bronze | Ichrak Chaib | (Turkey) 2022 Istanbul | Women's Welterweight | 20 May 2022 |

== List of medalists at World Combat Games ==
| Medal | Name | Games | Event |
|---|---|---|---|
| Bronze | Mohamed Flissi | (China) 2010 Beijing | Men's Light flyweight (-49 kg) |
| Bronze | Abdelmalek Rahou | (China) 2010 Beijing | Men's Middleweight (-75 kg) |
| Bronze | Chouaib Bouloudinat | (China) 2010 Beijing | Men's Super heavyweight (+91 kg) |

== List of medalists at Mediterranean Games ==
| Medal | Name | Games | Event |
|---|---|---|---|
| Gold | Brahim Brahimi | (Morocco) 1983 Casablanca | Men's Light Flyweight (– 48 kg) |
| Gold | Mustapha Moussa | (Morocco) 1983 Casablanca | Men's Light Heavyweight (– 81 kg) |
| Gold | Mohamed Bouchiche | (Morocco) 1983 Casablanca | Men's Heavyweight (– 91 kg) |
| Gold | Hocine Nini | (Algeria) 1975 Algiers | Men's Featherweight (-57 kg) |
| Gold | Mohamed Missouri | (Algeria) 1975 Algiers | Men's Middleweight (-75 kg) |
| Gold | Noureddine Meziane | (Syria) 1987 Latakia | Men's Light Middleweight (– 71 kg) |
| Gold | Mohamed Bouchiche | (Syria) 1987 Latakia | Men's Heavyweight (– 91 kg) |
| Gold | Mohamed Haioun | (Greece) 1991 Athens | Men's Light Flyweight (– 48 kg) |
| Gold | Ahmed Dine | (Greece) 1991 Athens | Men's Middleweight (-75 kg) |
| Gold | Mohamed Allalou | (Italy) 1997 Bari | Men's Featherweight (– 60 kg) |
| Gold | Mebarek Soltani | (Tunisia) 2001 Tunis | Men's Flyweight (– 51 kg) |
| Gold | Rachid Hamani | (Italy) 2009 Pescara | Men's Middleweight (-75 kg) |
| Gold | Mohamed Flissi | (Turkey) 2013 Mersin | Men's Light flyweight (-49 kg) |
| Gold | Reda Benbaziz | (Turkey) 2013 Mersin | Men's Bantamweight (-56 kg) |
| Gold | Abdelkader Chadi | (Turkey) 2013 Mersin | Men's Light welterweight (-64 kg) |
| Gold | Ilyas Abbadi | (Turkey) 2013 Mersin | Men's Welterweight (-69 kg) |
| Gold | Abdelhafid Benchabla | (Turkey) 2013 Mersin | Men's Light heavyweight (-81 kg) |
| Gold | Jugurtha Ait Bekka | (Algeria) 2022 Oran | Men's welterweight (69 kg) |
| Gold | Roumaysa Boualam | (Algeria) 2022 Oran | Women's minimumweight (48 kg) |
| Gold | Hadjila Khelif | (Algeria) 2022 Oran | Women's lightweight (60 kg) |
| Gold | Imane Khelif | (Algeria) 2022 Oran | Women's light welterweight (63 kg) |
| Gold | Yahia Abdelli | (Algeria) 2022 Oran | Men's light welterweight (63 kg) |

== List of medalists at African Games ==
| Medal | Name | Games | Event |
|---|---|---|---|
| Gold | Loucif Hamani | (Nigeria) 1973 Lagos | Men's Light Middleweight (– 71 kg) |
| Gold | Mohamed Missouri | (Algeria) 1978 Algiers | Men's Middleweight (– 75 kg) |
| Gold | Mourad Fergane | (Algeria) 1978 Algiers | Men's Light Middleweight (– 71 kg) |
| Gold | Hocine Soltani | (Egypt) 1991 Cairo | Men's Featherweight (– 57 kg) |
| Gold | Mohamed Bahari | (Mozambique) 1995 Harare | Men's Middleweight (– 75 kg) |
| Gold | Noureddine Medjehoud | (South Africa) 1999 Johannesburg | Men's Featherweight (– 57 kg) |
| Gold | Mohamed Bahari | (South Africa) 1999 Johannesburg | Men's Light Heavyweight (– 81 kg) |
| Gold | Mohamed Azzaoui | (South Africa) 1999 Johannesburg | Men's Heavyweight (– 91 kg) |
| Gold | Malik Bouziane | (Nigeria) 2003 Abuja | Men's Bantamweight (– 54 kg) |
| Gold | Hadj Belkheir | (Nigeria) 2003 Abuja | Men's Featherweight (– 57 kg) |
| Gold | Abderahim Mechenouai | (Algeria) 2007 Algiers | Men's Flyweight (– 51 kg) |
| Gold | Abdelhalim Ouradi | (Algeria) 2007 Algiers | Men's Bantamweight (– 54 kg) |
| Gold | Abdelkader Chadi | (Algeria) 2007 Algiers | Men's Featherweight (– 57 kg) |
| Gold | Nabil Kassel | (Algeria) 2007 Algiers | Men's Middleweight (– 75 kg) |
| Gold | Abdelhafid Benchabla | (Mozambique) 2011 Maputo | Men's Light Heavyweight (– 81 kg) |
| Gold | Chouaib Bouloudinat | (Mozambique) 2011 Maputo | Men's Heavyweight (– 91 kg ) |
| Gold | Kamel Rahmani | (Mozambique) 2011 Maputo | Men's Super Heavyweight (+ 91 kg) |
| Gold | Mohamed Flissi | (Republic of the Congo) 2015 Brazzaville | Men's Flyweight (-52 kg) |
| Gold | Reda Benbaziz | (Republic of the Congo) 2015 Brazzaville | Men's Lightweight (-60 kg) |
| Gold | Abdelkader Chadi | (Republic of the Congo) 2015 Brazzaville | Men's Light Welterweight (-64 kg) |
| Gold | Abdelhafid Benchabla | (Republic of the Congo) 2015 Brazzaville | Men's Light Heavyweight (-81 kg) |
| Gold | Souhila Bouchene | (Republic of the Congo) 2015 Brazzaville | Women's Flyweight -51 kg |
| Gold | Abdelhafid Benchebla | (Morocco) 2019 Rabat | Men's Heavyweight |
| Gold | Roumaysa Boualam | (Morocco) 2019 Rabat | Women's Flyweight |
| Gold | Ousama Kanouni | (Ghana) 2023 Accra | Men's −86 kg |
| Gold | Fatiha Mansouri | (Ghana) 2023 Accra | Women's −48 kg |
| Gold | Roumaysa Boualam | (Ghana) 2023 Accra | Women's −50 kg |
| Gold | Ichrak Okchaib | (Ghana) 2023 Accra | Women's −63 kg |

== List of medalists at African Championships ==
| Medal | Name | Games | Event |
|---|---|---|---|
| Gold | Kamel Abboud | 1979 Benghazi, Libya | Men's Lightweight (-60 kg) |
| Gold | Hocine Soltani | 1994 Johannesburg, South Africa | Men's Lightweight (-60 kg) |
| Gold | Mohamed Benguesmia | 1994 Johannesburg, South Africa | Men's Light Heavyweight (-81 kg) |
| Gold | Redha Boualem | 1998 Algiers, Algeria | Men's Light Flyweight (– 48 kg) |
| Gold | Hichem Blida | 1998 Algiers, Algeria | Men's Flyweight (– 51 kg) |
| Gold | Mohamed Allalou | 1998 Algiers, Algeria | Men's Light Welterweight (– 63,5 kg) |
| Gold | Abdelaziz Toulbini | 1998 Algiers, Algeria | Men's Middleweight (– 75 kg) |
| Gold | Mohamed Benguesmia | 1998 Algiers, Algeria | Men's Light Heavyweight (-81 kg) |
| Gold | Nedjadi Belahouel | 1998 Algiers, Algeria | Men's Heavyweight (– 91 kg ) |
| Gold | Mohamed Azzaoui | 1998 Algiers, Algeria | Men's Super Heavyweight (+ 91 kg) |
| Gold | Mebarek Soltani | 2001 Port Louis, Mauritius | Men's Flyweight (– 51 kg) |
| Gold | Mohamed Allalou | 2001 Port Louis, Mauritius | Men's Light Welterweight (– 63,5 kg) |
| Gold | Mohamed Djaafri | 2001 Port Louis, Mauritius | Men's Welterweight (– 67 kg) |
| Gold | Benamar Meskine | 2001 Port Louis, Mauritius | Men's Light Middleweight (– 71 kg) |
| Gold | Abdelghani Kenzi | 2001 Port Louis, Mauritius | Men's Middleweight (– 75 kg) |
| Gold | Malik Bouziane | 2003 Yaoundé, Cameroon | Men's Bantamweight (– 54 kg) |
| Gold | Mohamed Allalou | 2003 Yaoundé, Cameroon | Men's Light Welterweight (– 64 kg) |
| Gold | Benamar Meskine | 2003 Yaoundé, Cameroon | Men's Welterweight (– 69 kg) |
| Gold | Malik Bouziane | 2005 Casablanca, Morocco | Men's Bantamweight (– 54 kg) |
| Gold | Nabil Kassel | 2005 Casablanca, Morocco | Men's Middleweight (– 75 kg) |
| Gold | Abdelkader Chadi | 2007 Antananarivo, Madagascar | Men's Featherweight (– 57 kg) |
| Gold | Hamza Kramou | 2007 Antananarivo, Madagascar | Men's Lightweight (-60 kg) |
| Gold | Abdelaziz Toulbini | 2007 Antananarivo, Madagascar | Men's Heavyweight (– 91 kg ) |
| Gold | Newfel Ouatah | 2007 Antananarivo, Madagascar | Men's Super Heavyweight (+ 91 kg) |
| Gold | Abdelhalim Ouradi | 2009 Vacoas, Mauritius | Men's Bantamweight (– 54 kg) |
| Gold | Abdelhafid Benchabla | 2009 Vacoas, Mauritius | Men's Light Heavyweight (-81 kg) |
| Gold | Nasserredine Fillali | 2009 Vacoas, Mauritius | Men's Light Welterweight (-64 kg) |
| Gold | Nezha Boumaraf | 2010 Yaoundé, Cameroon | Women's Featherweight (57 kg) |
| Gold | Mohamed Amine Ouadahi | 2011 Yaoundé, Cameroon | Men's Bantamweight (-56 kg) |
| Gold | Abdelkader Chadi | 2011 Yaoundé, Cameroon | Men's Lightweight (-60 kg) |
| Gold | Abdelmalek Rahou | 2011Yaoundé, Cameroon | Men's Middleweight (– 75 kg) |
| Gold | Souhila Bouchene | 2014 Yaoundé, Cameroon | Women's Light flyweight (-48 kg) |
| Gold | Mohamed Flissi | 2015 Casablanca, Morocco | Men's Flyweight (-52 kg) |
| Gold | Reda Benbaziz | 2015 Casablanca, Morocco | Men's Lightweight (-60 kg) |
| Gold | Abdelkader Chadi | 2015 Casablanca, Morocco | Men's Light Welterweight (-64 kg) |
| Gold | Abdelhafid Benchabla | 2015 Casablanca, Morocco | Men's Light Heavyweight (-81 kg) |
| Gold | Mohamed Flissi | (Republic of the Congo) 2017 Brazzaville, Congo | Men's Flyweight (52 kg) |
| Gold | Souhila Bouchene | (Republic of the Congo) 2017 Brazzaville, Congo | Women's Light flyweight (48 kg) |
| Gold | Ouidad Sefouh | (Republic of the Congo) 2017 Brazzaville, Congo | Women's Bantamweight (54 kg) |
| Gold | Jugurtha Ait baka | 2022 Maputo, Mozambique | Men's (67 kg) |
| Gold | Roumaysa Boualam | 2022 Maputo, Mozambique | Women's (50 kg) |
| Gold | Imane Khelif | 2022 Maputo, Mozambique | Women's (63 kg) |
| Gold | Ichrak Chaib | 2022 Maputo, Mozambique | Women's (66 kg) |
| Gold | Jugurtha Ait baka | 2023 Yaoundé, Cameroon | Men's (-63.5 kg) |
| Gold | Roumaysa Boualam | 2023 Yaoundé, Cameroon | Women's (-50 kg) |
| Gold | Hadjila Khelif | 2023 Yaoundé, Cameroon | Women's (-60 kg) |
| Gold | Ichrak Chaib | 2023 Yaoundé, Cameroon | Women's (-63 kg) |

== List of medalists at Afro-Asian Games ==
| Medal | Name | Games | Event |
|---|---|---|---|
| Bronze | Malik Bouziane | 2003 Hyderabad, India | Men's Bantamweight (– 54 kg) |
| Bronze | Benamar Meskine | 2003 Hyderabad, India | Men's Welterweight (– 69 kg) |
| Bronze | Nabil Kassel | 2003 Hyderabad, India | Men's Middleweight (– 75 kg) |

== List of medalists at Pan Arab Games ==
| Medal | Name | Games | Event |
|---|---|---|---|
| Gold | Mohamed Missouri | (Morocco) 1974 Damascus, Syria | Men's Middleweight (– 75 kg) |
| Gold | Mustapha Moussa | 1985 Rabat, Morocco | Men's Light Heavyweight (-81 kg) |
| Silver | Kamel Abboud | 1985 Rabat, Morocco | Men's Welterweight (– 67 kg) |
| Silver | Mohamed Bouchiche | 1985 Rabat, Morocco | Men's Heavyweight (– 91 kg ) |
| Bronze | Abdel Majid Bengadi | 1985 Rabat, Morocco | Men's Light Flyweight (– 48 kg) |
| Bronze | Brahim Brahimi | 1985 Rabat, Morocco | Men's Flyweight (– 51 kg) |
| Bronze | Tahar Namar | 1985 Rabat, Morocco | Men's Bantamweight (– 54 kg) |
| Bronze | Azeddine Said | 1985 Rabat, Morocco | Men's Lightweight (-60 kg) |
| Bronze | Noureddine Meziane | 1985 Rabat, Morocco | Men's Light Middleweight (– 71 kg) |
| Bronze | Mohamed Zaoui | 1985 Rabat, Morocco | Men's Middleweight (– 75 kg) |
| Gold | Abdelaziz Boulahia | 1997 Beirut, Lebanon | Men's Bantamweight (– 54 kg) |
| Gold | Noureddine Medjehoud | 1997 Beirut, Lebanon | Men's Featherweight (– 57 kg) |
| Gold | Mohamed Allalou | 1997 Beirut, Lebanon | Men's Lightweight (-60 kg) |
| Gold | Hamza Madani | 1997 Beirut, Lebanon | Men's Light Heavyweight (-81 kg) |
| Gold | Mohamed Belgasmia | 1997 Beirut, Lebanon | Men's Heavyweight (– 91 kg ) |
| Silver | Benamar Meskine | 1997 Beirut, Lebanon | Men's Welterweight (– 67 kg) |
| Silver | Mohamed Bahari | 1997 Beirut, Lebanon | Men's Middleweight (– 75 kg) |
| Bronze | Nabil Talbi | 1997 Beirut, Lebanon | Men's Light Flyweight (– 48 kg) |
| Bronze | Mehdi Assous | 1997 Beirut, Lebanon | Men's Flyweight (– 51 kg) |
| Gold | Nacer Keddam | 1999 Amman, Jordan | Men's Flyweight (– 51 kg) |
| Gold | Mohamed Allalou | 1999 Amman, Jordan | Men's Light Welterweight (– 63,5 kg) |
| Gold | Fouad Amadia | 1999 Amman, Jordan | Men's Welterweight (– 67 kg) |
| Gold | Mohamed Azzaoui | 1999 Amman, Jordan | Men's Heavyweight (– 91 kg ) |
| Silver | Abdelghani Kinzi | 1999 Amman, Jordan | Men's Middleweight (– 75 kg) |
| Silver | Mohamed Bahari | 1999 Amman, Jordan | Men's Light Heavyweight (-81 kg) |
| Bronze | Hichem Blida | 1999 Amman, Jordan | Men's Bantamweight (– 54 kg) |
| Gold | Hamoud Boubraouet | 2004 Algiers, Algeria | Men's Light Flyweight (– 48 kg) |
| Gold | Malik Bouziane | 2004 Algiers, Algeria | Men's Bantamweight (– 54 kg) |
| Gold | Hadj Belkheir | 2004 Algiers, Algeria | Men's Featherweight (– 57 kg) |
| Gold | Nabil Kassel | 2004 Algiers, Algeria | Men's Middleweight (– 75 kg) |
| Silver | Nasreddine Filali | 2004 Algiers, Algeria | Men's Lightweight (-60 kg) |
| Silver | Benyamine Basmi | 2004 Algiers, Algeria | Men's Light Welterweight (-64 kg) |
| Bronze | Mbarek Soltani | 2004 Algiers, Algeria | Men's Flyweight (– 51 kg) |
| Bronze | Abdelghani Kinzi | 2004 Algiers, Algeria | Men's Light Heavyweight (-81 kg) |
| Gold | Mohamed Amine Oudahi | 2007 Cairo, Egypt | Men's Bantamweight (– 54 kg) |
| Silver | Samir Brahimi | 2007 Cairo, Egypt | Men's Light Flyweight (– 48 kg) |
| Bronze | Brahim Ouakil | 2007 Cairo, Egypt | Men's Lightweight (-60 kg) |
| Silver | Barag Sid Ali | 2011 Doha, Qatar | Men's Light Welterweight (-64 kg) |
| Silver | Abdelatif Sahnoune | 2011 Doha, Qatar | Men's Heavyweight (– 91 kg ) |
| Bronze | Ahmed Meziane | 2011 Doha, Qatar | Men's Light flyweight (-49 kg) |
| Bronze | Reda Benbaziz | 2011 Doha, Qatar | Men's Bantamweight (-56 kg) |
| Bronze | Zohir Kadache | 2011 Doha, Qatar | Men's Welterweight (– 69 kg) |
| Bronze | Saad Kadous | 2011 Doha, Qatar | Men's Middleweight (– 75 kg) |
| Bronze | Kamel Rahmani | 2011 Doha, Qatar | Men's Super Heavyweight (+ 91 kg) |
| Gold | Fatiha Mansouri | 2023 Algiers, Algeria | Women's (-48 kg) |
| Gold | Roumaysa Boualam | 2023 Algiers, Algeria | Women's (-50 kg) |
| Gold | Hadjila Khelif | 2023 Algiers, Algeria | Women's (-60 kg) |
| Gold | Zobeida Hayam Fatima Zohra | 2023 Algiers, Algeria | Women's (-63 kg) |
| Gold | Imane Khelif | 2023 Algiers, Algeria | Women's (-66 kg) |
| Gold | Kamel Khennoussi | 2023 Algiers, Algeria | Men's (-48 kg) |
| Gold | Jugurtha Ait Bekka | 2023 Algiers, Algeria | Men's (-63,5 kg) |
| Gold | Chemseddine Kramou | 2023 Algiers, Algeria | Men's (-67 kg) |
| Gold | Mourad Kadi | 2023 Algiers, Algeria | Men's (+92 kg) |
| Silver | Fatima Zohra Abdelkader Hadjala | 2023 Algiers, Algeria | Women's (-54 kg) |
| Silver | Djouher Benane | 2023 Algiers, Algeria | Women's (-75 kg) |
| Silver | Mohamed Flissi | 2023 Algiers, Algeria | Men's (-54 kg) |
| Silver | Ahmed Abderraouf Ghazli | 2023 Algiers, Algeria | Men's (-75 kg) |
| Bronze | Souha Miloudi | 2023 Algiers, Algeria | Women's (-52 kg) |
| Bronze | Salem Tamma | 2023 Algiers, Algeria | Men's (-60 kg) |
| Bronze | Azzouz Boudia | 2023 Algiers, Algeria | Men's (-86 kg) |
| Bronze | Youcef Islam Yaiche | 2023 Algiers, Algeria | Men's (-71 kg) |
| Bronze | Tarek Taruket | 2023 Algiers, Algeria | Men's (-92 kg) |

== See also ==
- Algeria at the Olympics
