= Boxing at the 2004 Summer Olympics – Light heavyweight =

Light heavyweight boxing at the Games of the XXVIII Olympiad
- Venue: Peristeri Olympic Boxing Hall
- Date: 14–29 August 2004
- Competitors: 28 from 28 nations

Medalists
1st place, gold medalist(s)		Andre Ward	United States
2nd place, silver medalist(s)		Magomed Aripgadjiev	Belarus
3rd place, bronze medalist(s)		Ahmed Ismail El Shamy	Egypt
3rd place, bronze medalist(s)		Utkirbek Haydarov	Uzbekistan

The light heavyweight boxing competition at the 2004 Summer Olympics in Athens was held from 14 to 29 August at Peristeri Olympic Boxing Hall. This is limited to those boxers weighing between 75 and 81 kilograms.

== Competition format ==
Like all Olympic boxing events, the competition was a straight single-elimination tournament. This event consisted of 28 boxers who have qualified for the competition through various tournaments held in 2003 and 2004. The competition began with a preliminary round on 14 August, where the number of competitors was reduced to 16, and concluded with the final on 29 August. As there were fewer than 32 boxers in the competition, a number of boxers received a bye through the preliminary round. Both semi-final losers were awarded bronze medals.

All bouts consisted of four rounds of two minutes each, with one-minute breaks between rounds. Punches scored only if the white area on the front of the glove made full contact with the front of the head or torso of the opponent. Five judges scored each bout; three of the judges had to signal a scoring punch within one second for the punch to score. The winner of the bout was the boxer who scored the most valid punches by the end of the bout.

== Schedule ==
All times are Greece Standard Time (UTC+2)

Date	Time	Round
Saturday, 14 August 2004	13:30 & 19:30	Round of 32
Thursday, 19 August 2004	13:30	Round of 16
Tuesday, 23 August 2004	19:30	Quarterfinals
Friday, 27 August 2004	19:30	Semifinals
Sunday, 29 August 2004	13:30	Final

== Qualifying Athletes ==
Athlete	Country
Yoan Pablo Hernández	Cuba
Evgeny Makarenko	Russia
Andre Ward	United States
Clemente Russo	Italy
Song Hak-Seong	South Korea
Abdelhani Kenzi	Algeria
Isaac Ekpo	Nigeria
Utkirbek Haydarov	Uzbekistan
İhsan Yıldırım Tarhan	Turkey
Soulan Pownceby	New Zealand
Beibut Shumenov	Kazakhstan
Aleksy Kuziemski	Poland
Trevor Stewardson	Canada
Flavio Furtado	Cape Verde
Shohrat Kurbanov	Turkmenistan
Ahmed Ismail El Shamy	Egypt
Taylor Mabika	Gabon
Elias Pavlidis	Greece
Washington Silva	Brazil
Ali Ismailov	Azerbaijan
Lei Yuping	China
Pierre Celestin Yana	Cameroon
Andriy Fedchuk	Ukraine
Jitender Kumar	India
Magomed Aripgadjiev	Belarus
Ramiro Reducindo	Mexico
Edgar Muñoz	Venezuela
Marijo Šivolija	Croatia

== Results ==
Round of 32
Song Hak-seong (KOR)	19
Abdelhani Kenzi (ALG)	25
Isaac Ekpo (NGR)	11
Utkirbek Haydarov (UZB)	21
İhsan Yıldırım Tarhan (TUR)	RSC
Soulan Pownceby (NZL)
Beibut Shumenov (KAZ)	34
Aleksy Kuziemski (POL)	22
Trevor Stewardson (CAN)	36
Flavio Furtado (CPV)	20
Shohrat Kurbanov (TKM)	22
Ahmed Ismail El Shamy (EGY)	44
Taylor Mabika (GAB)	17
Elias Pavlidis (GRE)	32
Washington Silva (BRA)	22
Ali Ismailov (AZE)	27
Lei Yuping (CHN)	24
Pierre Celestin Yana (CMR)	16
Andriy Fedchuk (UKR)	RSC
Jitender Kumar (IND)
Magomed Aripgadjiev (BLR)	29
Ramiro Reducindo (MEX)	10
Edgar Muñoz (VEN)	31
Marijo Šivolija (CRO)	23

Round of 16
Yoan Pablo Hernández (CUB)	18
Evgeny Makarenko (RUS)	30
Andre Ward (USA)	17
Clemente Russo (ITA)	9
Abdelhani Kenzi (ALG)	19
Utkirbek Haydarov (UZB)	31
İhsan Yıldırım Tarhan (TUR)	27
Beibut Shumenov (KAZ)	19
Trevor Stewardson (CAN)	22
Ahmed Ismail El Shamy (EGY)	38
Elias Pavlidis (GRE)	31
Ali Ismailov (AZE)	16
Lei Yuping (CHN)	17
Andriy Fedchuk (UKR)	9
Magomed Aripgadjiev (BLR)	18
Edgar Muñoz (VEN)	10

Quarterfinals
Evgeny Makarenko (RUS)	16
Andre Ward (USA)	23
Utkirbek Haydarov (UZB)	16
İhsan Yıldırım Tarhan (TUR)	11
Ahmed Ismail El Shamy (EGY)	RSC
Elias Pavlidis (GRE)
Lei Yuping (CHN)	18
Magomed Aripgadjiev (BLR)	27

Semifinals
Andre Ward (USA)	17
Utkirbek Haydarov (UZB)	15
Ahmed Ismail El Shamy (EGY)	20
Magomed Aripgadjiev (BLR)	23

Finals
Andre Ward (USA)	20
Magomed Aripgadjiev (BLR)	13
