= FR Yugoslavia at the 2001 Mediterranean Games =

- IOC code: SCG
- NOC: Olympic Committee of Serbia and Montenegro

in Tunis
- Medals Ranked 12th: Gold 3 Silver 5 Bronze 14 Total 22

Mediterranean Games appearances (overview)
- 1997; 2001; 2005

Other related appearances
- Yugoslavia (1951–1991); Montenegro (2009–); Serbia (2009–); Kosovo (2018–)

FR Yugoslavia competed at the 2001 Mediterranean Games held in Tunis, Tunisia.

== Medals by sport ==
Sport	Gold	Silver	Bronze	Total
Table tennis	2	0	1	3
Boxing	1	0	2	3
Athletics	0	2	3	5
Karate	0	1	4	5
Judo	0	1	2	3
Wrestling	0	1	1	2
Swimming	0	0	1	1
Totals (7 entries)	3	5	14	22

== List of Medalists ==
Medal	Name	Sport	Event
Gold	Slobodan Grujić, Aleksandar Karakašević	Table tennis	Men's doubles
Gold	Biljana Golić, Gordana Plavšić	Table tennis	Women's doubles
Gold	Milorad Gajović	Boxing	91kg
Silver	Miloš Mijalković	Judo	66kg
Silver	Predrag Stojanov	Karate	+ 80 kg
Silver	Olivera Jevtić	Athletics	10.000m
Silver	Marija Martinović	Athletics	Triple jump
Silver	Norbert Futo	Wrestling	Greco-Roman 58 kg
Bronze	Olivera Jevtić	Athletics	5.000m
Bronze	Nenad Lončar	Athletics	110m Hurdles
Bronze	Danial Jahić	Athletics	Long jump
Bronze	Geard Ajetović	Boxing	67 kg
Bronze	Aleksandar Pejanović	Boxing	+ 91 kg
Bronze	Snežana Perić	Karate	60kg
Bronze	Sara Peković-Grbić	Karate	65kg
Bronze	Vanja Vrhovac	Karate	+65kg
Bronze	Slađana Mitić	Karate	+ 80kg
Bronze	Vladan Marković	Swimming	100m Butterfly
Bronze	Dalibor Bušić	Wrestling	Greco-Roman 76 kg
Bronze	Slobodan Grujić	Table tennis	Men's singles
Bronze	Mara Kovačević	Judo	78 kg
Bronze	Andrija Đurišić	Judo	81 kg
