= Boxing at the 2004 Summer Olympics – Bantamweight =

Bantamweight boxing at the Games of the XXVIII Olympiad
- Venue: Peristeri Olympic Boxing Hall
- Date: 17–29 August 2004
- Competitors: 27 from 27 nations

Medalists
1st place, gold medalist(s)		Guillermo Rigondeaux	Cuba
2nd place, silver medalist(s)		Worapoj Petchkoom	Thailand
3rd place, bronze medalist(s)		Aghasi Mammadov	Azerbaijan
3rd place, bronze medalist(s)		Bahodirjon Sultonov	Uzbekistan

The bantamweight boxing competition at the 2004 Summer Olympics in Athens was held from 17 to 29 August at Peristeri Olympic Boxing Hall. This is limited to those boxers weighing between 51 and 54 kilograms.

== Competition format ==
Like all Olympic boxing events, the competition was a straight single-elimination tournament. This event consisted of 27 boxers who have qualified for the competition through various tournaments held in 2003 and 2004. The competition began with a preliminary round on 17 August, where the number of competitors was reduced to 16, and concluded with the final on 29 August. As there were fewer than 32 boxers in the competition, a number of boxers received a bye through the preliminary round. Both semi-final losers were awarded bronze medals.

== Schedule ==
All times are Greece Standard Time (UTC+2)

Date	Time	Round
Tuesday, 17 August 2004	13:30 & 19:30	Round of 32
Friday, 20 August 2004	19:30	Round of 16
Monday, 23 August 2004	19:30	Quarterfinals
Friday, 27 August 2004	19:30	Semifinals
Sunday, 29 August 2004	13:30	Final

== Qualifying Athletes ==
Athlete	Country
Andrew Kooner	Canada
Alexander Espinoza	Venezuela
Andrzej Liczik	Poland
Bahodirjon Sultonov	Uzbekistan
Gennady Kovalev	Russia
Malik Bouziane	Algeria
Ali Hallab	France
Mehrullah Lassi	Pakistan
Aybek Abdymomunov	Kyrgyzstan
Guillermo Rigondeaux	Cuba
Liu Yuan	China
Khavazhi Khatsigov	Belarus
Juan Manuel López	Puerto Rico
Worapoj Petchkoom	Thailand
Kim Won-Il	South Korea
Nestor Bolum	Nigeria
Petit Jesus Ngnitedem	Gabon
Hamid Ait Bighrade	Morocco
Diwakar Prasad	India
Abner Mares	Mexico
Zsolt Bedák	Hungary
Argenis Mendez	Dominican Republic
Maksym Tretyak	Ukraine
Joel Brunker	Australia
Aghasi Mammadov	Azerbaijan
Abel Aferalign	Ethiopia
Detelin Dalakliev	Bulgaria

== Results ==
Round of 32
Malik Bouziane (ALG)	19
Ali Hallab (FRA)	16
Mehrullah Lassi (PAK)	36
Aybek Abdymomunov (KGZ)	22
Guillermo Rigondeaux (CUB)	21
Liu Yuan (CHN)	7
Khavazhi Khatsigov (BLR)	27
Juan Manuel López (PUR)	19
Worapoj Petchkoom (THA)	RSC
Kim Won-Il (KOR)
Nestor Bolum (NGR)	23
Petit Jesus Ngnitedem (GAB)	17
Hamid Ait Bighrade (MAR)	17
Diwakar Prasad (IND)	25
Abner Mares (MEX)	27
Zsolt Bedák (HUN)	36
Argenis Mendez (DOM)	24
Maksym Tretyak (UKR)	30
Joel Brunker (AUS)
Aghasi Mammadov (AZE)	RSC
Abel Aferalign (ETH)
Detelin Dalakliev (BUL)	RSC

Round of 16
Andrew Kooner (CAN)	37
Alexander Espinoza (VEN)	20
Andrzej Liczik (POL)
Bahodirjon Sultonov (UZB)	RSC
Gennady Kovalev (RUS)	23
Malik Bouziane (ALG)	20
Mehrullah Lassi (PAK)
Guillermo Rigondeaux (CUB)	RSC
Khavazhi Khatsigov (BLR)	18
Worapoj Petchkoom (THA)	33
Nestor Bolum (NGR)	RSC
Diwakar Prasad (IND)
Zsolt Bedák (HUN)	24
Maksym Tretyak (UKR)	27
Aghasi Mammadov (AZE)	35
Detelin Dalakliev (BUL)	16

Quarterfinals
Andrew Kooner (CAN)	32
Bahodirjon Sultonov (UZB)	44
Gennady Kovalev (RUS)	5
Guillermo Rigondeaux (CUB)	20
Worapoj Petchkoom (THA)	29
Nestor Bolum (NGR)	14
Maksym Tretyak (UKR)	12
Aghasi Mammadov (AZE)	32

Semifinals
Bahodirjon Sultonov (UZB)	13
Guillermo Rigondeaux (CUB)	27
Worapoj Petchkoom (THA)	27
Aghasi Mammadov (AZE)	19

Final
Guillermo Rigondeaux (CUB)	22
Worapoj Petchkoom (THA)	13

Notes

- David Munyasia (Kenya) was ejected from the 2004 Athens Games four days before the draw after he tested positive for cathine.
- Petit Jesus Ngnitedem (Gabon) replaced Mohamed Abdelsayed (Egypt) at the last moment winner for the second African qualification.
