= Boxing at the 2002 African Military Games =

- Location: Nairobi, Kenya
- Dates: 15–17 April

Boxing at the 2002 African Military Games was held from 15 to 17 April 2002 in Nairobi, Kenya.

== Results ==
Event	Gold	Silver	Bronze
48 kg	Redouane Bouchtouk; Morocco	Moses Bonakele; South Africa	Sula Katumba; Uganda
51 kg	Sammy Magima; Kenya	Elliot Mmila; Botswana	Benedict Tsokolo Seboka; Lesotho
51 kg	Sammy Magima; Kenya	Elliot Mmila; Botswana	Rajab Omary Mbwana; Tanzania
54 kg	David Munyasia; Kenya	Amine Hosni; Tunisia	Zohou Ilenne; Benin
54 kg	David Munyasia; Kenya	Amine Hosni; Tunisia	Emilian Patrick Polino; Tanzania
57 kg	Joshua Veikko; Namibia	Petro Mtangwa; Tanzania	Stephen Miyaso; Kenya
60 kg	Karim Matumla; Tanzania	Sammy Imbaya; Kenya	Redouane Hedrouk; Algeria
60 kg	Karim Matumla; Tanzania	Sammy Imbaya; Kenya	Wendy Mwanje; Uganda
63.5 kg	Mohamed Ali Sassi; Tunisia	Collins Bulinda; Kenya	Hicham Nafil; Morocco
63.5 kg	Mohamed Ali Sassi; Tunisia	Collins Bulinda; Kenya	Moses Tsoene; Lesotho
67 kg	Paulus Ali Nuumbembe; Namibia	Abdellah Benbiar; Morocco	John Thiongo; Kenya
67 kg	Paulus Ali Nuumbembe; Namibia	Abdellah Benbiar; Morocco	Oscar Binka; Uganda
71 kg	Marouene Si Ahmed; Algeria	Moez Ferna; Tunisia	Joshua Ndere; Kenya
75 kg	Seif Ennasr Jilani; Tunisia	Sofiane Sebilti; Algeria	Gerald Ojuka; Kenya
75 kg	Seif Ennasr Jilani; Tunisia	Sofiane Sebilti; Algeria	Lawrence Mbangiwa; Botswana
81 kg	Dirang Thipe; Botswana	M.Tebao; South Africa	Babou Thiaw; Senegal
81 kg	Dirang Thipe; Botswana	M.Tebao; South Africa	Sibiri Kabore; Burkina Faso
91 kg	Frederick Orieyo; Kenya	Bizango Mboto; Democratic Republic of the Congo	Tony Sekabira; Uganda
+91 kg	Philip Ouma; Kenya	Mike Sekabembe; Uganda	
