= Jordan at the Mediterranean Games =

- IOC code: JOR
- NOC: Jordan Olympic Committee
- Competitors: 20
- Medals Ranked 29th: Gold 0 Silver 0 Bronze 0 Total 0

Mediterranean Games appearances (overview)
- 1951; 1955; 1959; 1963; 1967; 1971; 1975; 1979; 1983; 1987; 1991; 1993; 1997; 2001; 2005; 2009; 2013; 2018; 2022; 2026

Jordan has competed at one edition, Tunis 2001, of the Mediterranean Games. The country was invited to be an honorary participant for the fiftieth anniversary of the competition, sending twenty athletes. Jordan did not win any medals.
