= Abdelkader Ould Makhloufi =

Algerian boxer (1944–2025)

Personal information
- Nationality: Algerian
- Born: 26 May 1944 Boufarik, French Algeria
- Died: 7 January 2025 (aged 80) Toulouse, France

Boxing career
- Weight class: Lightweight; Super featherweight

Boxing record
- Total fights: 58
- Wins: 47
- Win by KO: 21
- Losses: 9
- Draws: 2

Abdelkader Ould Makhloufi (Arabic: عبد القادر ولد مخلوفي, romanized: ʻAbd al-Qādir Wuld Makhlūfī; 26 May 1944 – 7 January 2025) was an Algerian boxer.

== Life and career ==
Born in Boufarik on 26 May 1944, Makhloufi began boxing at the age of 16. He was notably the African Boxing Union lightweight champion on 15 December 1973 after defeating Ghanaian Joe Tetteh. He held the title until 1977. In 1975, he faced Kuniaki Shibata for the World Boxing Council super featherweight championship, though he lost by decision after 15 rounds. From 1979 to 1983, he was coach of the Algeria national boxing team. During this time, his team won several championships in Arab and African competitions.

Makhloufi died in Toulouse on 7 January 2025, at the age of 80.
