= Boxing at the 1999 All-Africa Games =

Boxing competitions

The Boxing Tournament at the 1999 All-Africa Games was held in Johannesburg, South Africa from 10 to 18 September. It served as a qualification tournament for the 2000 Summer Olympics in Sydney, Australia. The number one and two earned a ticket for the Olympic tournament.

== Medal winners ==
Event	Gold	Silver	Bronze
Light Flyweight (– 48 kilograms)	Muhamed Kizito (UGA)	Phumzile Matyhila (RSA)	Abdulharim Elzaid (EGY); Sebusiso Keketsi (LES)
Flyweight (– 51 kilograms)	Celestin Augustin (MAD)	Nacer Keddam (ALG)	Zolani Marali (RSA); Jackson Asiku (UGA)
Bantamweight (– 54 kilograms)	Abdul Tebazalwa (UGA)	Riaz Durgahed (MRI)	Moez Zemzemi (TUN); Herman Ngoudjo (CMR)
Featherweight (– 57 kilograms)	Noureddine Madjhoud (ALG)	Kassim Napa Adam (UGA)	Achille Mandayen (CAF); Yohannes Sheferaw (ETH)
Lightweight (– 60 kilograms)	Jesus Kibunde (DRC)	Naoufel Ben Rabah (TUN)	Gilbert Khunwane (BOT)
Light Welterweight (– 63,5 kilograms)	Ajose Olusegun (NGA)	Mohamed Allalou (ALG)	Frederick Munga (KEN); Ben Neequaye (GHA)
Welterweight (– 67 kilograms)	Kamel Chater (TUN)	Aegawj Tsegasellase (ETH)	Mosolesa Tsie (LES); Fadel Showban (EGY)
Light Middleweight (– 71 kilograms)	Mohamed Hikal (EGY)	Osumanu Adama (GHA)	Mohamed Marmouri (TUN); Stéphane N'Zue Mba (GAB)
Middleweight (– 75 kilograms)	Ramadan Abdelghaffar (EGY)	Eromosele Albert (NGA)	Abdelhani Kenzi (ALG); Peter Kariuki (KEN)
Light Heavyweight (– 81 kilograms)	Mohamed Bahari (ALG)	Jegbefumere Albert (NGA)	Ahmed Ismail El Shamy (EGY); Danie Venter (RSA)
Heavyweight (– 91 kilograms)	Mohamed Azzaoui (ALG)	Amrou Moustafa (EGY)	Braimah Kamoko (GHA); Bizango Mboto (DRC)
Super Heavyweight (+ 91 kilograms)	Ahmed Abdel Samad (EGY)	Michael Macaque (MRI)	Hillaire Simo (CMR); Teke Oruh (NGA)
