= Utkirbek Haydarov =

Uzbekistani boxer (born 1974)

Utkirbek Khaydarov
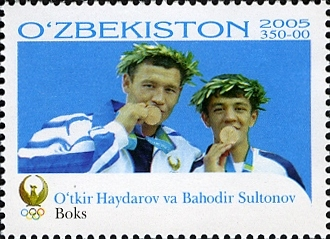

Personal information
- Full name: Уткирбек Хайдаров
- Nationality: Uzbekistan
- Born: January 25, 1974 (age 52) Andijon, Uzbek SSR, Soviet Union
- Height: 1.86 m (6 ft 1 in)
- Weight: 72 kg (159 lb)

Sport
- Sport: Boxing
- Weight class: Middleweight, Light heavyweight
- Club: Dynamo
Medal record
Olympic Games
Bronze medal – third place	2004 Athens	Light Heavyweight
World Amateur Championships
Gold medal – first place	1999 Houston	Middleweight
Silver medal – second place	2001 Belfast	Middleweight
Bronze medal – third place	2005 Mianyang	Light heavyweight
Asian Games
Gold medal – first place	2002 Busan	Middleweight
Asian Championships
Gold medal – first place	2002 Seremban	Middleweight
Silver medal – second place	2005 Ho Chi Minh City	Light heavyweight

Utkirbek Haydarov (Уткирбек Хайдаров; born January 25, 1974, in Andijon) is an Uzbekistani boxer who competed in the light heavyweight (81 kg) at the 2004 Summer Olympics and won the bronze medal.

== Career ==
The aggressive southpaw won the middleweight world title six years earlier in Houston but lost his first match at the Olympics 2000 and moved up in weight.

He qualified for the 2004 Athens Games by ending up in first place in the 2nd AIBA Asian 2004 Olympic Qualifying Tournament in Karachi, Pakistan. In the final he defeated Turkmenistan's Shokhrat Kurbanov. At light heavyweight he also won the bronze medal at the 2005 World Amateur Boxing Championships in Mianyang, People's Republic of China after having

=== Olympic results ===
2000 (as a middleweight)

- Lost to Gaydarbek Gaydarbekov (Russia) 10–11

2004 (as a Light heavyweight)

- Defeated Isaac Ekpo (Nigeria) 21–11
- Defeated Abdelhani Kensi (Algeria) 31–19
- Defeated Ihsan Yildirim Tarhan (Turkey) 16–11
- Lost to Andre Ward (United States) 15–17
