= Aleksandar Pejanović =

Serbian boxer

Personal information
- Born: 1974 Titograd, SR Montenegro, SFR Yugoslavia
- Died: 30 May 2011 (aged 36–37) Podgorica, Montenegro
Medal record
Men's Boxing
Representing Yugoslavia
Mediterranean Games
Bronze medal – third place	2001 Tunis	Super Heavyweight

Aleksandar "Saša" Pejanović (1974 – 30 May 2011) was a Montenegrin Serb boxer who represented the Federal Republic of Yugoslavia internationally. He had been a policeman until 2006 when he was fired for allegedly physically attacking an employee at the Hotel Crna Gora casino. Pejanović was also a known supporter of Serbian–Montenegrin unionism, and was arrested during the riot after Montenegro's recognition of Kosovo independence in 2008. He was brutally beaten while incarcerated, leading to a trial against the alleged perpetrators within the police force, this gained wide media attention. In 2011, while Pejanović was sitting on the terrace of a cafe in Podgorica, he was fatally shot in the chest by his neighbor Zoran Bulatović. He was the son of Đuro Pejanović, a writer.

== Competition ==
- Boxing at the 2001 Mediterranean Games, Bronze, together with Geard Ajetović.

== Sources ==
- D. R. - B. J. "Ko cepacrnogorsku zastavu | Aktuelno". Novosti.rs.
- "Политика Online - Полиција брутално претукла учесника демонстрација". Politika.rs.
- "2008 Human Rights Reports: Montenegro". State.gov. Archived from the original on 2009-02-26.
- "Amateur Boxing - Aleksandar Pejanovic (Yugoslavia)". The-sports.org.
