= Flávio Furtado =

Cape Verdean boxer (born 1978)

- Born: Flávio Furtado; 15 March 1978 (age 48)
- Nationality: Cape Verdean
- Height: 1.88 m (6 ft 2 in)
- Weight: 81 kg (179 lb; 12 st 11 lb)
- Division: Light heavyweight

Amateur record
- Total: 2
- Wins: 0
- By knockout: 0
- Losses: 2
- By knockout: 1
- Draws: 0
- No contests: 0
- Last updated on: 2 January 2014

Flávio Furtado (born 15 March 1978) is a Cape Verdean former amateur boxer who competed at the 2004 Summer Olympics and the 2005 World Championships.

== Career ==
As a teenager, Furtado won a bronze medal at the 1997 Jeux de la Francophonie.

Furtado participated in the 2004 Summer Olympics for his native island African country. There, he lost 36-20 to Canadian Trevor Stewardson in the Light heavyweight division in the round of 32.

Furtado qualified for the Athens Games by winning the silver medal at the 1st AIBA African 2004 Olympic Qualifying Tournament in Casablanca, Morocco. In the final of the event, he was defeated the Algerian fighter, Abdelhani Kenzi.

The following year he competed at the 2005 World Amateur Boxing Championships in Mianyang, China where he was defeated by Lithuania's Daugirdas Šemiotas.
