= Mayanja =

Mayanja is a Ugandan name and may refer to:

- Mayanja River, a river of Uganda
- Brian Mayanja (born 1983), Ugandan boxer
- Kibirige Mayanja, Ugandan politician, founder and first president of the Justice Forum party in Uganda; his first attempt at politics was in 1994
