= İhsan Yıldırım Tarhan =

Turkish boxer

Personal information
- Nationality: Turkish
- Born: November 24, 1980 (age 45)
- Height: 1.83 m (6 ft 0 in)
- Weight: Light heavyweight

Boxing career
Medal record
Men's Boxing
Representing Turkey
World University Boxing Championships
Gold medal – first place	2004 Antalya	Light heavyweight
EU Championships
Gold medal – first place	2003 Strasbourg	Light heavyweight
Gold medal – first place	2004 Madrid	Light heavyweight
Mediterranean Games
Silver medal – second place	2001 Tunis	Light heavyweight
Silver medal – second place	2005 Almeria	Light heavyweight

İhsan Yıldırım Tarhan (born 24 November 1980) is a Turkish boxer competing in the light heavyweight (81 kg) division.

== Boxing career ==
At the 2001 Mediterranean Games, he won the silver medal after he had fought his way into the finals against John Dovi from France and Ahmed Ismail from Egypt and only then was defeated by the Tunisian Mourad Sahraoui.

In 2002 he won gold medals at Bocskai tournament in Debrecen, Hungary and at Ahmet Cömert tournament in Istanbul, Turkey. He also won bronze at Chowdhry Cup in Baku, Azerbaijan and even launched at the 2002 European Amateur Boxing Championships in Russia. There he defeated the Moldovan Mihail Muntean before retiring in the second round just against Ivan Ribac from Yugoslavia (11:12).

In 2003 he won silver at the Bocskai tournament, and each bronze at Chowdhry Cup and Ahmet Cömert tournament. He also won with Final victory against the Irish Kenny Egan, the European Union Amateur Boxing Championships in Strasbourg, France. At the 2003 World Amateur Boxing Championships, he was eliminated in the preliminary round against Aleksy Kuziemski from Poland (7:10).

In 2004 he won respectively the World University Championships in Antalya and the European Union Amateur Boxing Championships in Madrid, Spain. He beat in EU-finals Aleksy Kuziemski, previously beatConstantin Bejenaru from Romania and Tomáš Adámek from Czech Republic. In the finals of the World Cup to him a victory against military champion Danil Shved from Russia had succeeded. At 2004 European Amateur Boxing Championships in Pula, Croatia also defeating Kenny Egan again, but failed in the second round at the Russians Evgeny Makarenko. In addition, he won overwhelming the Strandja tournament in Plovdiv, Bulgaria. He defeated Stefan Bálint from Romania (TKO), Tony Davis of England (33:13), the Olympic silver medalist Rudolf Kraj from Czech Republic (25:12), the Olympic bronze medalist Tervel Pulev from Bulgaria (19:11) and the two-time world champion Clemente Russo of Italy (29:18).

He then took part in the 2004 Summer Olympics in Athens, Greece and beat Soulan Pownceby from New Zealand and Beibut Shumenov from Kazakhstan then lost in the quarter finals against Utkirbek Haydarov from Uzbekistan as a result he was 5th.

He again won the silver medal at the 2005 Mediterranean Games in Spain, but failed in the first round of the 2005 World Cup in China against Adura Olelehin from Nigeria (15:16). At the 2006 European Amateur Boxing Championships in Bulgaria, he was defeated in the second round against Alexander Povernov from Germany.
