= Ali Hallab =

French boxer (born 1981)

Personal information
- Born: 4 April 1981 (age 45) Mantes-la-Jolie, Yvelines, France
Medal record
Men's boxing
Representing France
World Amateur Championships
Bronze medal – third place	2005 Mianyang	Bantamweight
European Amateur Championships
Silver medal – second place	2004 Pula	Bantamweight
Bronze medal – third place	2002 Perm	Bantamweight
EU Amateur Championships
Gold medal – first place	2003 Strasbourg	Bantamweight
Bronze medal – third place	2004 Madrid	Bantamweight
Mediterranean Games
Gold medal – first place	2005 Almeíra	Bantamweight

Ali Hallab (born 4 April 1981 in Mantes-la-Jolie, Yvelines) is a French former professional boxer who competed from 2009 to 2013, holding the WBO European super bantamweight title from 2012 to 2013. As an amateur, he won the bronze medal at the 2005 World Championships.

== Career ==
Hallab participated in the 2004 Summer Olympics for his native European country. There he was stopped in the first round of the Bantamweight (54 kg) division by Algeria's Malik Bouziane.

Hallab won the bronze medal at the 2002 European Amateur Boxing Championships, and the silver medal in the same division at the 2004 European Amateur Boxing Championships in Pula, Croatia. He later won the bronze medal at the 2005 World Amateur Boxing Championships.

At the 2007 World Amateur Boxing Championships he lost to local hero Gary Russell.

At the 2008 Beijing Olympics he lost to Indian Akhil Kumar 12-5.

== Professional boxing record ==
17 fights	16 wins	0 losses
By knockout	9	0
By decision	7	0
Draws	1	

No.	Result	Record	Opponent	Type	Round, time	Date	Location	Notes
17	Win	16–0–1	(Spain) Angel Lorente	UD	12	15 Nov 2013	Salle COSEC Pablo Neruda, Les Mureaux, France	Won vacant WBC Mediterranean super bantamweight title
16	Win	15–0–1	(Hungary) Andras Varga	TKO	4 (6)	4 Oct 2013	Salle Pierre Beregovoy, Vignes aux Bois, France	
15	Win	14–0–1	(United Kingdom) Sean Hughes	KO	5 (12)	12 Apr 2013	Le Colisée, Chalon-sur-Saône, France	
14	Win	13–0–1	(Georgia (country)) Nikoloz Berkatsashvili	KO	2 (12)	12 Jan 2013	La Palestre, Le Cannet, France	Retained WBO European super bantamweight title
13	Win	12–0–1	(Spain) Jorge Pérez	KO	4 (12)	4 May 2012	Palais des sports Marcel-Cerdan, Levallois-Perret, France	Won vacant WBO European super bantamweight title
12	Win	11–0–1	(France) Bastien Rozeaux	UD	10	29 Oct 2011	Salle Cosec, Les Mureaux, France	Retained French super bantamweight title
11	Win	10–0–1	(France) Amor Belahdj Ali	UD	10	2 Apr 2011	La Palestre, Le Cannet, France	Won vacant French super bantamweight title
10	Win	9–0–1	(Georgia (country)) Giorgi Gachechiladze	PTS	6	4 Feb 2011	Maison des sports, Dieppe, France	
9	Draw	8–0–1	(France) Amor Belahdj Ali	PTS	10	30 Oct 2010	Palais des Sports, Paris, France	
8	Win	8–0	(Bulgaria) Aleksandar Vladimirov	UD	12	12 Jun 2010	Place Jamaâ El Fna, Marrakesh, Morocco	
7	Win	7–0	(France) Alix Djavoiev	KO	3 (6)	16 Apr 2010	Espace Francois Mitterrand, Hénin-Beaumont, France	
6	Win	6–0	(Spain) Manuel Sequera	TKO	3 (8)	20 Mar 2010	La Palestre, Le Cannet, France	
5	Win	5–0	(Russia) Damir Bulatov	TKO	4 (8)	10 Dec 2009	Cirque d'hiver, Paris, France	
4	Win	4–0	(Nicaragua) Bismarck Alfaro	PTS	6	15 Oct 2009	Cirque d'hiver, Paris, France	
3	Win	3–0	(Romania) Cristian Niculae	KO	2 (6)	27 Jun 2009	La Palestre, Le Cannet, France	
2	Win	2–0	(France) David Cagna Ginouves	TKO	5 (6)	23 Apr 2009	Cirque d'hiver, Paris, France	
1	Win	1–0	(France) Youcef Abgour	UD	4	5 Mar 2009	Cirque d'hiver, Paris, France	
