= 1st AIBA African 2004 Olympic Qualifying Tournament =

Qualification for African boxers for the 1996 Olympic Games

The 1st AIBA African 2004 Olympic Boxing Qualifying Tournament was held in Casablanca, Morocco from January 15 to January 22, 2004. It was the first chance for amateur boxers from Africa to qualify for the 2004 Summer Olympics since the 2003 All-Africa Games. First and second place qualified for the Olympic Tournament in Athens, Greece, except for the heavyweight and super heavyweight events, which only qualified for first place. A total of 89 fighters from 18 countries competed.

== Medal winners ==
Event	Gold	Silver	Bronze
Light Flyweight (– 48 kilograms)	Jolly Katongole (UGA)	Redouane Bouchtouk (MAR)	Hatim Amara (TUN) Lalatra Robenarivo (MAD)
Flyweight (– 51 kilograms)	Hicham Mesbahi (MAR)	Mebarek Soltani (ALG)	Dessu Ahoneh Dereje (ETH) Martin Mubiru (UGA)
Bantamweight (– 54 kilograms)	Mohamed Abdelsayed (EGY)	David Munyasia (KEN)	Petit Jesus Ngnitedem (GAB) Atanus Mugerwa (UGA)
Featherweight (– 57 kilograms)	Saifeddine Nejmaoui (TUN)	Brian Mayanja (UGA)	Mervin Aza (MRI) Galada Ludumo (RSA)
Lightweight (– 60 kilograms)	Tahar Tamsamani (MAR)	Taoufik Chouba (TUN)	Belay Geteneh (ETH) Sam Lukando (UGA)
Light Welterweight (– 64 kilograms)	Mohamed Ali Sassi (TUN)	Hicham Nafil (MAR)	Samuel Sisay Ketsa (ETH) Michael Medor (MRI)
Welterweight (– 69 kilograms)	Benamar Meskine (ALG)	Ait Hammi Miloud (MAR)	Kwanele Zulu (RSA) Willy Bertrand Tankeu (CMR)
Middleweight (– 75 kilograms)	Khostso Motau (RSA)	Joseph Lubega (UGA)	Nabil Kassel (ALG) Daniel Shisia (KEN)
Light Heavyweight (– 81 kilograms)	Abdelhani Kensi (ALG)	Flavio Furtado (CPV)	Gao Petero (ANG) Adil Atmari (MAR)
Heavyweight (– 91 kilograms)	Rachid El Haddak (MAR)	Amougou Amboudui (CMR)	Odino Lieorue (KEN) Apostolos Elefteriou (RSA)
Super Heavyweight (+ 91 kilograms)	Carlos Takam (CMR)	Georgio Cabta (ANG)	Mohamed Amanissi (MAR) Stephanius Leindrandt (RSA)

== Qualified ==
=== Light Flyweight (– 48 kg) ===
- Jolly Katongole (UGA)
- Redouane Bouchtouk (MAR)

=== Flyweight (– 51 kg) ===
- Hicham Mesbahi (MAR)
- Mebarek Soltani (ALG)

=== Bantamweight (– 54 kg) ===
- Mohamed Abdelsayed (EGY)
- David Munyasia (KEN)

=== Featherweight (– 57 kg) ===
- Saifeddine Nejmaoui (TUN)
- Brian Mayanja (UGA)

=== Lightweight (– 60 kg) ===
- Tahar Tamsamani (MAR)
- Taoufik Chouba (TUN)

=== Light Welterweight (– 64 kg) ===
- Mohamed Ali Sassi (TUN)
- Hicham Nafil (MAR)

=== Welterweight (– 69 kg) ===
- Benamar Meskine (ALG)
- Ait Hammi Miloud (MAR)

=== Middleweight (– 75 kg) ===
- Khostso Motau (RSA)
- Joseph Lubega (UGA)

=== Light Heavyweight (– 81 kg) ===
- Abdelhani Kensi (ALG)
- Flavio Furtado (CPV)

=== Heavyweight (– 91 kg) ===
- Rachid El Haddak (MAR)

=== Super Heavyweight (+ 91 kg) ===
- Carlos Takam (CMR)

== See also ==
- Boxing at the 2003 All-Africa Games
- 2nd AIBA African 2004 Olympic Qualifying Tournament
