= Andrzej Liczik =

Polish boxer (born 1977)

Personal information
- Full name: Andrzej Liczik
- Nationality: Poland
- Born: March 4, 1977 (age 49) Feodosiya, Crimea, Ukrainian SSR, Soviet Union
- Height: 1.69 m (5 ft 7 in)
- Weight: 54 kg (119 lb)

Sport
- Sport: Boxing
- Weight class: Bantamweight
- Club: Box Club Hetman Białystok
Medal record
European Amateur Championships
Bronze medal – third place	2004 Pula	Bantamweight
EU Amateur Championships
Bronze medal – third place	2005 Cagliari	Light-Flyweight

Andrzej Liczik (born 4 March 1977 in Feodosiya, Crimea, Soviet Union) is a boxer of Polish nationality.

He participated at the 2004 Summer Olympics for Poland. There he was stopped in the second round of the Bantamweight (54 kg) division by Uzbekistan's eventual bronze medalist Bahodirjon Sooltonov.

Liczik had won the bronze medal in the same division six months earlier, at the 2004 European Amateur Boxing Championships in Pula, Croatia.
