= Perel Rivan =

Cameroonian boxer (born 1981)

Medal record

Men's Boxing

Representing Cameroon

All-Africa Games
| Bronze medal – third place | 2003 Abuja | Lightweight |

Cessaire Perel Rivan (born 15 July 1981) is a Cameroonian boxer. Rivan competes in the light welterweight division (64 kg).

Rivan won a bronze medal at the 2003 All-Africa Games and competed in the 2006 Commonwealth Games.
