= Boxing at the 2003 Afro-Asian Games =

Boxing at the 2003 Afro-Asian Games was held from October 24 to October 31, 2003 at two stadia - GMC Balayogi Athletic Stadium and Gachibowli Indoor Stadium. Medals were awarded in eleven events, with each medal corresponding to a certain weight division ranging from Light Fly weight to Super Heavy weight.

The boxing program was almost exactly the same as that of the 2008 Summer Olympics. The events were all-male, and there were two bronze medalists for each weight category. Thus, a total of 44 medals were awarded.

Uzbekistan turned out to be the boxing powerhouse, as it swept five of the eleven gold medals. However, the host nation - India - got the maximum number of medals in total - 10 out of 44.

== Medal summary ==
Source :

Event	Gold	Silver	Bronze
Light flyweight Up to 48 kg	Harry Tañamor; Philippines (PHN)	Mohammad Ali Qamar; India (IND)	Ethiopia
Light flyweight Up to 48 kg	Harry Tañamor; Philippines (PHN)	Mohammad Ali Qamar; India (IND)	South Korea
Flyweight; 48 to 51 kg	Akhil Kumar; India (IND)	Violito Payla; Philippines (PHN)	South Korea
Flyweight; 48 to 51 kg	Akhil Kumar; India (IND)	Violito Payla; Philippines (PHN)	Namibia
Bantamweight; 51 to 54 kg	Bahodirjon Sooltonov; Uzbekistan (UZB)	Diwakar Prasad; India (IND)	Algeria
Bantamweight; 51 to 54 kg	Bahodirjon Sooltonov; Uzbekistan (UZB)	Diwakar Prasad; India (IND)	South Korea
Featherweight; 54 to 57 kg	Muideen Ganiyu; Nigeria (NGR)	Anthresh Lalit Lakra; India (IND)	South Korea
Featherweight; 54 to 57 kg	Muideen Ganiyu; Nigeria (NGR)	Anthresh Lalit Lakra; India (IND)	Ethiopia
Lightweight; 57 to 60 kg	Uzbekistan	South Korea	Philippines
Lightweight; 57 to 60 kg	Uzbekistan	South Korea	India
Light welterweight 60 to 64 kg	Bakhyt Sarsekbayev; Uzbekistan (UZB)	Vijender Kumar; India (IND)	Pakistan
Light welterweight 60 to 64 kg	Bakhyt Sarsekbayev; Uzbekistan (UZB)	Vijender Kumar; India (IND)	Kazakhstan
Welterweight; 64 to 69 kg	Egypt	Kazakhstan	Algeria
Welterweight; 64 to 69 kg	Egypt	Kazakhstan	South Korea
Middleweight; 69 to 75 kg	Uzbekistan	Pakistan	India
Middleweight; 69 to 75 kg	Uzbekistan	Pakistan	Algeria
Light heavyweight 75 to 81 kg	Jitender Kumar; India (IND)	Beibut Shumenov; Kazakhstan (KZS)	Uzbekistan
Light heavyweight 75 to 81 kg	Jitender Kumar; India (IND)	Beibut Shumenov; Kazakhstan (KZS)	Uganda
Heavyweight; 81 to 91 kg	Emmanuel Izonritei; Nigeria (NGR)	V. Johnson; India (IND)	Egypt
Heavyweight; 81 to 91 kg	Emmanuel Izonritei; Nigeria (NGR)	V. Johnson; India (IND)	Uzbekistan
Super heavyweight Above 91 kg	Uzbekistan	Kazakhstan	Nigeria
Super heavyweight Above 91 kg	Uzbekistan	Kazakhstan	India

== Medal table ==
* Host nation (India)

Rank	Nation	Gold	Silver	Bronze	Total
1	Uzbekistan (UZB)	5	0	2	7
2	India (IND)*	2	5	3	10
3	Nigeria (NGR)	2	0	1	3
4	Philippines (PHI)	1	1	1	3
5	Egypt (EGY)	1	0	1	2
6	Kazakhstan (KAZ)	0	3	1	4
7	South Korea (KOR)	0	1	5	6
8	Pakistan (PAK)	0	1	1	2
9	Algeria (ALG)	0	0	3	3
10	Ethiopia (ETH)	0	0	2	2
11	Namibia (NAM)	0	0	1	1
11	Uganda (UGA)	0	0	1	1
Totals (12 entries)		11	11	22	44
