= Lei Yuping =

Chinese boxer (born 1979)

Personal information
- Nationality: Chinese
- Born: 24 January 1979 (age 46); Jiangsu, China

Sport
- Sport: Boxing

Chinese name
- Chinese: 雷玉平
Transcriptions

Lei Yuping (born 24 January 1979) is a Chinese boxer. He competed in the men's light heavyweight event at the 2004 Summer Olympics.
