= Jolly Katongole =

Ugandan boxer (1985–2015)

Personal information
- Born: 15 December 1985 Mulago, Uganda
- Died: 14 May 2015 (aged 29) Mulago, Uganda
Medal record
Men's Boxing
Representing Uganda
All-Africa Games
Bronze medal – third place	2003 Abuja	Light Flyweight

Jolly Katongole (15 December 1985 – 14 May 2015) was a boxer from Uganda, who participated in the 2004 Summer Olympics for his native African country.

Katongole debuted with the national team at the age of 16. He won the bronze medal at the 2003 All-Africa Games in Abuja, Nigeria. Katongole qualified for the Athens Olympics by winning the gold medal at the 1st AIBA African 2004 Olympic Qualifying Tournament in Casablanca, Morocco. In the final of the event he defeated Morocco's Redouane Bouchtouk. At the Olympics, he was stopped in the first round of the light flyweight (– 48 kg) division by Turkey's eventual runner-up Atagün Yalçınkaya. Following his defeat, Katongole deserted the Ugandan delegation and remained illegally in Greece until he was deported. He struggled with substance abuse issues until his death in 2015, reportedly of tetanus.
