= 2001 African Amateur Boxing Championships =

Boxing competitions

- Host city: Port Louis
- Country: Mauritius
- Dates: May 14–20, 2001

The 11th edition of the African Amateur Boxing Championships were held in Port Louis, Mauritius from 14 May to 20 May 2001. The event was organised by the African governing body for amateur boxing, the African Boxing Confederation (ABC).

== Medal winners ==
Event	Gold	Silver	Bronze
Light Flyweight (– 48 kilograms)	Anicet Rasonanaivo (MAD)	Phumzile Matyhila (RSA)	
Flyweight (– 51 kilograms)	Mebarek Soltani (ALG)	Bruno Julie (MRI)	
Bantamweight (– 54 kilograms)	Leslie Seketswe (BOT)	Abdul Tebazalwa (UGA)	
Featherweight (– 57 kilograms)	Michael Medor (MRI)	Hichem Mandili (MAR)	
Lightweight (– 60 kilograms)	Giovani Frontin (MRI)	Isaac Sentamu (UGA)	
Light Welterweight (– 63,5 kilograms)	Mohamed Allalou (ALG)	Dintwa Sloca (BOT)	
Welterweight (– 67 kilograms)	Mohamed Djaafri (ALG)	Paulus Ali Nuumbembe (NAM)	
Light Middleweight (– 71 kilograms)	Benamar Meskine (ALG)	Kotsao Motau (RSA)	
Middleweight (– 75 kilograms)	Abdelghani Kenzi (ALG)	El Hadj Djibril Fall (SEN)	
Light Heavyweight (– 81 kilograms)	Daniel Venter (RSA)	Ndyaye Mohamadou (SEN)	
Heavyweight (– 91 kilograms)	Marco Bangard (MRI)	Kende Amadou (SEN)	
Super Heavyweight (+ 91 kilograms)	Michael Macaque (MRI)	Cherif Seni (GUI)	

== See also ==
- Boxing at the 1999 All-Africa Games
