= Ait Hammi Miloud =

Moroccan boxer

Ait Hammi Miloud (born July 8, 1978 in Rabat, Morocco) is a Moroccan Olympic boxer. He participated in the 2004 Summer Olympics in Athens, Greece.

== Boxing career ==
Hammi Miloud qualified for the Athens Games by winning the silver medal at the 1st AIBA African 2004 Olympic Qualifying Tournament in Casablanca, Morocco. In the final of the event he lost to the Algerian fighter Benamar Meskine.

In 2004, he shared the bronze medal at the 48th World Military Boxing Championship in the 69 kg. weight class, behind gold medal winner Boyd Melson of the US, and silver medal winner Elshod Rasulov of Uzbekistan, at Fort Huachuca, Arizona.

He was a member of the team that competed for Africa at the 2005 Boxing World Cup in Moscow, Russia.
