= Pierre Celestin Yana =

Cameroonian boxer (born 1978)

Personal information
- Nationality: Cameroonian
- Born: 12 January 1978 (age 47)

Sport
- Sport: Boxing

Pierre Celestin Yana (born 12 January 1978) is a Cameroonian boxer. He competed in the men's light heavyweight event at the 2004 Summer Olympics.
