= Mebarek Soltani =

Algerian boxer (born 1982)

Personal information
- Full name: Mebarek Soltani
- Nationality: Algeria
- Born: April 10, 1982 (age 44)
- Height: 1.72 m (5 ft 8 in)
- Weight: 51 kg (112 lb)

Sport
- Sport: Boxing
- Weight class: Featherweight
Medal record
All-Africa Games
| Bronze medal – third place | 2003 Abuja | Flyweight |
African Amateur Championships
| Gold medal – first place | 2001 Port Louis | Flyweight |
Mediterranean Games
| Gold medal – first place | 2001 Tunis | Flyweight |

Mebarek Soltani (born April 10, 1982) is a boxer from Algeria. He is the nephew of Hocine Soltani.

He participated in the 2000 and 2004 Summer Olympics for his native North African country. In 2000 he was stopped in the first round of the light flyweight (– 48 kg) competition. In 2004 he was stopped in the first round of the flyweight (– 51 kg) division by Russia's Georgy Balakshin.

Soltani won the bronze medal in the same division at the All-Africa Games in Abuja, Nigeria. He qualified for the Athens Games by winning the silver medal at the 1st AIBA African 2004 Olympic Qualifying Tournament in Casablanca, Morocco. In the final of the event he lost to home fighter Hicham Mesbahi.
