= Jordan at the 2001 Mediterranean Games =

- IOC code: JOR
- NOC: Jordan Olympic Committee

in Tunis
- Competitors: 20 in 10 sports
- Medals Ranked 19th: Gold 0 Silver 0 Bronze 0 Total 0

Mediterranean Games appearances (overview)
- 1951; 1955; 1959; 1963; 1967; 1971; 1975; 1979; 1983; 1987; 1991; 1993; 1997; 2001; 2005; 2009; 2013; 2018; 2022

Jordan (JOR) competed at the 2001 Mediterranean Games in Tunis, Tunisia.

== Athletics ==
Three Jordanian athletes have achieved the minima of participation in the next Mediterranean Games (2 men. 1woman)

Key

- Note – Ranks given for track events are within the athlete's heat only
- Q = Qualified for the next round
- q = Qualified for the next round as a fastest loser or, in field events, by position without achieving the qualifying target
- NR = National record
- N/A = Round not applicable for the event
- Bye = Athlete not required to compete in round

Men
Track & road events

Athlete	Event	Semifinal		Final	
Athlete	Event	Result	Rank	Result	Rank
Mohammad Kafraini	5 000 m	—		14:39.78	13
Raeia Wesam Khraisat	110 m hurdles	14.67	7	Did not advance	

Women
Track & road events

Athlete	Event	Semifinal		Final	
Athlete	Event	Result	Rank	Result	Rank
Alaa Abdelhadi	100 m hurdles	9:53.24	10	Did not advance	

== Weightlifting ==
Men

Athlete	Event	Snatch		Clean & Jerk	
Athlete	Event	Result	Rank	Result	Rank
Awad Aboudi	+105 kg	167.5 kg	4	—	—

== Karate ==
Men

Athlete	Event	Round of 16	Quarterfinals	Semifinals	Repechage	Final / BM	
Athlete	Event	Opposition Result	Opposition Result	Opposition Result	Opposition Result	Opposition Result	Rank
Shadi Alnajjar	−65 kg						7
