= Boyd Melson =

American boxer (born 1981)

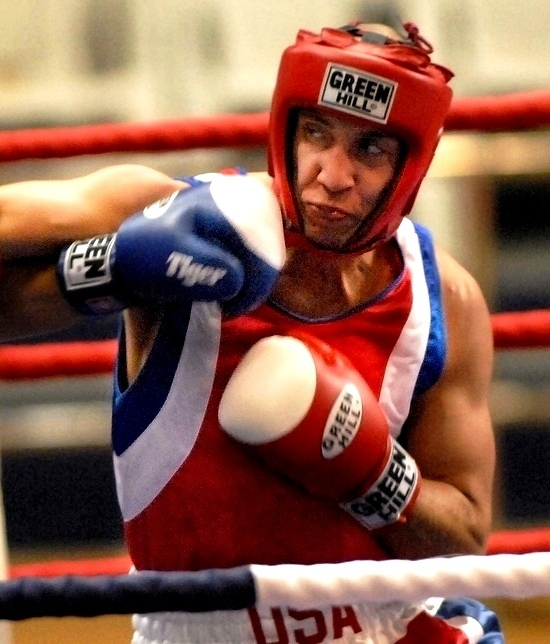

Personal information
- Nickname: Rainmaker
- Nationality: United States
- Born: October 16, 1981 (age 45) White Plains, New York
- Height: 5 ft 8 in (1.73 m)
- Weight: Light middleweight

Boxing career

Boxing record
- Wins: 15
- Win by KO: 4
- Losses: 2
- Draws: 1
Medal record
World Military Boxing Championship
Gold medal – first place	2004 Fort Huachuca, Arizona	69 kg
All Army Boxing Championships
Gold medal – first place	2004
Gold medal – first place	2005
Armed Forces Boxing Championships
Gold medal – first place	2004
Gold medal – first place	2005
US Amateur Boxing Championships
Bronze medal – third place	2005

Boyd "Rainmaker" Melson (born October 16, 1981) is a retired American light middleweight boxer.

As an amateur, Melson won the 48th World Military Boxing Championship gold medal in the 69 kg (152 lb) weight class, and was a three-time United States Army champion, a three-time NCBA All-American boxer, a four-time West Point Brigade Open Boxing Champion, and received the Colonel Marcus Award. He also won gold medals at the All Army Boxing Championships four times and at the Armed Forces Boxing Championships three times. He made it to the quarterfinals in the welterweight 2005 World Amateur Boxing Championships placing 5th in the world, won a bronze medal at the 2005 US Amateur Boxing Championships, won a silver medal at the 2006 US Amateur Boxing Championships, and was an Alternate for the 2008 US Olympic Boxing Team.

As a professional, Melson retired with a record of 15–2–1, with 4 of his wins coming by knockout. He is 5 feet 8 inches (1.73 m) tall, and competed professionally at 154 lb (70 kg). Melson donates all of the money that he earns in his boxing matches to spinal cord injury research and his efforts have been profiled on Real Sports with Bryant Gumbel, ESPN.com, Sports Illustrated, and Yahoo!, the Huffington Post and the Wall Street Journal.

In 2005, he received the Jewish Sports Hall of Fame "Scholar-Athlete of the Year Award." In 2013, he received the Jewish Sports Hall of Fame "Good Guy" Award. Melson was recently selected to be inducted into the Jewish Sports Hall of Fame in the 2018 class of inductees.

== Early and academic life ==
Melson is Jewish, and was born in Orange County, California as his father was stationed in Orange County while serving on Active Duty in the United States Army. At 10 months old, Melson's father was stationed at Fort Hamilton Army Base in Brooklyn, New York, where Melson spent the majority of his childhood. Melson was born to an Israeli Jewish mother (Annette Melson; also an Army veteran) and a Louisiana Creole father. His maternal grandparents were Holocaust survivors from Poland. He said:

"My grandfather, while being put onto a train en route to a death camp, escaped by sliding down the receptor tank full of defecation. It deposited him down the track allowing the train to pass over him until he could run off escaping. That is what he did to fight for his life and allow his bloodline of Judaism to pass down to his children, and now his grandchildren in me.”

He boxes with a Star of David on his trunks. Melson grew up primarily in Brooklyn, New York.

Melson graduated from West Point in 2003 with a psychology degree, and a minor in nuclear engineering. He also graduated as a lieutenant, and was promoted to captain three years later. He earned an MBA in business administration at Touro College.

== Army champion and world military champion ==
Melson started boxing in National Collegiate Boxing Association (NCBA) competition while he was a cadet at West Point. He was picked for the US Army World Class Athlete Program, and sent to Fort Carson, Colorado.

Melson was a four-time United States Army champion. He was also a three-time NCBA All-American boxer, a four-time West Point Brigade Open Boxing Champion, and received the Colonel Marcus Award, which is given to the best West Point boxer at graduation. He was trained by former lightweight world champion Joey Gamache in the first half of his professional boxing career, and trained by Simon Bakinde in the second half of his professional boxing career.

In 2004, he won the 48th World Military Boxing Championship gold medal in the 69 kg. weight class by defeating Elshod Rasulov of Uzbekistan at Fort Huachuca, Arizona (as Ait Hammi Miloud of Morocco shared the bronze medal with Vyacheslav Kusov of Ukraine). That year he also won gold medals at the All Army Boxing Championships and the Armed Forces Boxing Championships.

Melson made it to the quarterfinals in the welterweight 2005 World Amateur Boxing Championships, losing to future pro star Erislandy Lara of Cuba, the eventual gold medal winner. That year he also won gold medals at the All Army Boxing Championships and the Armed Forces Boxing Championships, and a bronze medal at the 2005 US Amateur Boxing Championships.

He was an alternate on the 2008 U.S. Olympic Boxing Team, but withdrew with an injury.

== Professional career ==
Melson became a professional in 2010 to raise research funds to honor a woman who had been his girlfriend. She had been in a wheelchair for 17 years, since the age of 10, following a diving accident. They had met while Melson was home on leave at the end of his junior year at West Point, when she was already using a wheelchair due to a diving accident.

Melson worked tirelessly to educate himself on spinal cord injuries and stem cell research. He traveled abroad with girlfriend Christan Zaccagnino so she could undergo experimental procedures that are not currently offered in the United States. While there, they were exposed to the vast expansion of work being done in this field that does not involve the use of embryonic stem cells.

Melson donates all of the money he earns in his boxing matches to spinal cord injury research. He gives it to Justadollarplease.org, a non-profit organization that raises money for the first U.S. chronic spinal cord injury trial in using umbilical cord stem cells. Along with Justadollarplease.org, Melson created Team Fight to Walk, to increase awareness in boxing of the importance of stem cell research for spinal cord injuries. Team Fight to Walk is composed of Melson, former Rutgers University football player Eric LeGrand, former two-time IBF cruiserweight champion Steve Cunningham, US Olympians Shawn Estrada and Demetrius Andrade and contender Deandre Latimore amongst other boxers.

Through April 2014, Melson was 14–1–1, with 4 of his wins by way of knockout and the sole defeat coming via controversial decision in what was considered one of the best local fights on the New York scene in recent memory. Welterweight Dmitry Salita said of him following a May 2011 bout: "I have seen tremendous improvement in Boyd in the last two fights. He is a very talented fighter and sets an example inside and outside the ring."

Since 2012, Melson has been training with head coach Simon Bakinde.

== Professional boxing record ==
15 Wins (4 Knockouts 11 decisions), 2 Losses, 1 Draw
Res.	Record	Opponent	Type	Rd., Time	Date	Location	Notes
—N/a	—N/a	(United States) Russ Niggemyer	-	? (6)	2011-10-01	(United States) Boardwalk Hall, Atlantic City, New Jersey	

== Honors ==
He was honored as the 2005 Marty Glickman Outstanding Jewish Scholastic (college) Athlete of the Year by the National Jewish Sports Hall of Fame. In 2013, he received the Jewish Sports Hall of Fame "Good Guy Award." He said, as to his award: "I am pleased to show that [Jews] can excel in all areas of human endeavor, and that is what is of great importance to me in being honored."

== Personal life ==
Outside of boxing, Melson works as a Motivational Speaker, a Group Fitness Instructor, and a Medical Device Sales Representative. He also serves as an Army Reserves Captain assigned to the 361st Press Camp Headquarters stationed out of Fort Totten in Queens, NY.

Melson spends much of his time volunteering for a variety of non-profits, mostly on Staten Island. These include: Team Fight to Walk, BOXER INC., Stop Soldiers Suicide, STORE-A-TOOTH, BIGVISION, Steve Harvey Youth Mentorship Camp, Summit Academy Charter School, In Bed and Chair Recovery Foundation, Demarco's Gym Free Weekly Boxing Clinics, Teddy Atlas Cops and Kids, Great Black Speakers Bureau, and Camelot Drug Rehabilitation Center.

== See also ==
- List of select Jewish boxers
