= Mohamed Ali Sassi =

Tunisian boxer (born 1980)

Personal information
- Born: March 20, 1980 (age 46)
Medal record
Men's Boxing
Mediterranean Games
Bronze medal – third place	2001 Tunis	Light Welterweight

Mohamed Ali Sassi (born March 20, 1980) is a Tunisian Olympic boxer . He represented his native North African country at the 2004 Summer Olympics in Athens, Greece. There he was stopped in the first round of the Men's Light-Welterweight (– 64 kg) competition by France's Willy Blain.

Ali Sassi qualified for the Athens Games by winning the gold medal at the 1st AIBA African 2004 Olympic Qualifying Tournament in Casablanca, Morocco. In the final of the event he defeated home fighter Hicham Nafil. He won a bronze medal at the 2001 Mediterranean Games in Tunis, Tunisia.
