= Petit Jesus Ngnitedem =

Gabonese boxer (born 1984)

Petit Jesus Ngnitedem (born 22 August 1984) is a Gabonese bantamweight boxer. He competed at the 2004 Summer Olympics in Athens. He lost in the round of 32 to the Nigerian Nestor Bolum.
