= Şöhrat Kurbanow =

Turkmenistani boxer

Shohrat Kurbanov
Personal information
- Full name: Shokhrat Kurbanov
- Nationality: Turkmenistan
- Born: 27 March 1971 (age 55) Ashgabat, Turkmen SSR, Soviet Union
- Height: 1.76 m (5 ft 9 1/2 in)
- Weight: 81 kg (179 lb)

Sport
- Sport: Boxing
- Weight class: Light heavyweight

Shokhrat Kurbanov (born 27 March 1971 in Ashgabat) is a retired amateur Turkmen boxer. He represented Turkmenistan in two editions of the Olympic Games (1996 and 2004), and later became a coach and chairman of the national sports centre for boxing, following his official retirement from his second Olympics.

Kurbanov made his official debut at the 1996 Summer Olympics in Atlanta, where he ousted his opening match to Sweden's Roger Petterson in the men's light middleweight division with a scoring decision of 2–7.

Eight years after competing in his last Olympics, Kurbanov qualified for his second Turkmen team, as a 33-year-old, in the men's light heavyweight division (80 kg) at the 2004 Summer Olympics in Athens by finishing second and receiving a berth from the second AIBA Asian Olympic Qualifying Tournament in Karachi, Pakistan. Unable to improve his fair performance from Atlanta, Kurbanov lost again the opening match to Egypt's Ahmed Ismail El Shamy through a unanimous decision in a default total score of 22–24. Kurbanov was also appointed as the Turkmen flag bearer by the National Olympic Committee in the opening ceremony while wearing a traditional national costume.
