= Benamar Meskine =

Algerian boxer (born 1973)

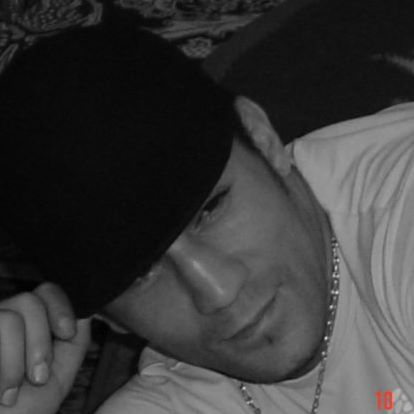

Personal information
- Full name: Benamar Meskine
- Nationality: Algeria
- Born: June 6, 1973 (age 53)
- Height: 1.73 m (5 ft 8 in)
- Weight: 64 kg (141 lb)

Sport
- Sport: Boxing
- Weight class: Welterweight
Medal record
All-Africa Games
Bronze medal – third place	2003 Abuja	Welterweight
Mediterranean Games
Silver medal – second place	2001 Tunis	Light Middleweight
African Amateur Championships
Gold medal – first place	2001 Port Louis	Light Middleweight
Gold medal – first place	2003 Yaoundé	Welterweight

Benamar Meskine (born June 6, 1973) is a boxer from Algeria.

He participated in the 2004 Summer Olympics for his native North African country. He was defeated in the first round of the welterweight division by Bakhtiyar Artayev.

Meskine qualified for the Athens Games by winning the gold medal at the 1st AIBA African 2004 Olympic Qualifying Tournament in Casablanca, Morocco. In the final of the event he defeated home fighter Ait Hammi Miloud. Meskine won the bronze medal in the same division one year earlier, at the All-Africa Games in Abuja, Nigeria.
