= Ahmed Ali Khan (boxer) =

Pakistani boxer (born 1981)

Personal information
- Nationality: Pakistani
- Born: 7 January 1981 (age 44)

Sport
- Sport: Boxing

Ahmed Ali Khan (born 7 January 1981) is a Pakistani boxer. He competed in the men's middleweight event at the 2004 Summer Olympics.

Khan won a silver medal in the men's 75 kg event at the 2002 Asian Games.
