= Michael Macaque =

Mauritian boxer (born 1974)

Personal information
- Nationality: Mauritius
- Born: 15 August 1974 (age 51) Port Louis, Mauritius
- Height: 1.78 m (5 ft 10 in)
- Weight: 103 kg (227 lb)

Sport
- Sport: Boxing
- Event: Super heavyweight
- Club: Vaconas NBC
Medal record
Boxing
Representing Mauritius
Commonwealth Games
| Silver medal – second place | 1998 Kuala Lumpur | Super heavyweight |
All-Africa Games
| Silver medal – second place | 1999 Johannesburg | Super heavyweight |
African Championships
| Gold medal – first place | 2001 Port Louis | Super heavyweight |
| Silver medal – second place | 2003 Yaoundé | Super heavyweight |

(Louis) Michael Macaque (born 15 August 1974) is a former Mauritian super heavyweight boxer, who competed at the 2000 Summer Olympics in Sydney, and served as the nation's flag bearer at the opening ceremony. He was also the runner-up in super heavyweight boxing at the 1998 Commonwealth Games in Kuala Lumpur, Malaysia, after being defeated by England's Audley Harrison.

At the 2000 Summer Olympics, Macaque qualified for the super heavyweight division in boxing after winning silver at the 1999 All-Africa Games in Johannesburg, South Africa. Unfortunately, he was eliminated in the first round after being defeated by Canada's Art Binkowski with a score of 14–21. A year later, Macaque repeated his success of winning the gold medal at the 2001 African Amateur Boxing Championships in his home nation Mauritius. His boxing career ended after winning silver at the 2003 African Amateur Boxing Championships in Yaoundé, Cameroon, losing out to Carlos Takam.

== See also ==
- List of flag bearers for Mauritius at the Olympics

Olympic Games
| Preceded by Khemraj Naiko | Flagbearer for Mauritius; Sydney 2000 | Succeeded by Michael Medor |
