= Gennady Kovalev =

Russian boxer

Personal information
- Full name: Геннадий Геннадиевич Ковалёв
- Nationality: Russia
- Born: May 17, 1983 (age 43) Kropotkin, Krasnodar Krai, Russian SFSR, Soviet Union
- Height: 1.73 m (5 ft 8 in)
- Weight: 64 kg (141 lb)

Sport
- Sport: Boxing
- Weight class: Light Welterweight
- Club: Rossiyskiy Sportivnyy Studencheskiy
Medal record
World Amateur Championships
Silver medal – second place	2003 Bangkok	Bantamweight
Silver medal – second place	2007 Chicago	Light Welterweight
European Amateur Championships
Gold medal – first place	2004 Pula	Bantamweight
Silver medal – second place	2002 Perm	Bantamweight

Gennady Gennadiyevich Kovalev (Russian: Геннадий Геннадиевич Ковалёв; born 17 May 1983 in Kropotkin, Krasnodar Krai) is a boxer from Russia.

== Career ==
He started boxing in 1995 in Miass, and his first coach was Anatoly Panguev.

Southpaw Kovalev won the silver medal at the 2003 World Amateur Boxing Championships, defeating Uzbekistan's Bahodirjon Sooltonov but losing to Azerbaijan's Aghasi Mammadov at bantam, and a gold medal at the 2004 European Amateur Boxing Championships .

He participated in the 2004 Summer Olympics for his native country. There he was beaten in the quarterfinals of the Bantamweight (54 kg) division by Cuba's eventual winner Guillermo Rigondeaux.

Now at junior welterweight he won the Russian Championships 2007 against legend Alexander Maletin 37:21. At the World championships he beat Bradley Saunders to reach the finals but lost to defending Kazakh champion Serik Sapiyev 5:20.

After his boxing career, Kovalev has found success as a professional MMA fighter, going 5–1 as a professional.

=== World amateur championships results ===
2003 (as a bantamweight)

- Defeated Berik Serikbayev (Kazakhstan) 21–6
- Defeated Zsolt Bedák (Hungary) 43–20
- Defeated Khavazi Khatsygov (Bulgaria) 25–14
- Defeated Bahodirjon Sooltonov (Uzbekistan) 21–15
- Lost to Aghasi Mammadov (Azerbaijan) 8–17

2007 (as a Light welterweight)

- Defeated Andrey Tsiruk (Belarus) 33–11
- Defeated Marufjon Fayzuloyev (Tajikistan) 24–10
- Defeated Gyula Kate (Hungary) 22–9
- Defeated Boris Georgiev (Bulgaria) walkover
- Defeated Bradley Saunders (England) 16–8
- Lost to Serik Sapiyev (Kazakhstan) 5–20

=== Olympic results ===
2004 (as a bantamweight)

- 1st round bye
- Defeated Malik Bouziane (Algeria) 23–20
- Lost to Guillermo Rigondeaux (Cuba) 5–20

2008 (as a Light welterweight)

- Defeated Maimaitituersun Qiong (China) 15–8
- Defeated Richarno Colin (Mauritius) 11:2
- lost to Roniel Iglesias (Cuba) 2:5
