= Boxing at the 2002 Asian Games – Men's 75 kg =

Boxing competitions

Men's 75 kg at the 2002 Asian Games
- Venue: Masan Gymnasium
- Date: 5–13 October 2002
- Competitors: 12 from 12 nations

Medalists
gold medal	Utkirbek Haydarov	Uzbekistan
silver medal	Ahmed Ali Khan	Pakistan
bronze medal	Moon Young-seung	South Korea
bronze medal	Baurzhan Kairmenov	Kazakhstan

The men's middleweight (75 kilograms) event at the 2002 Asian Games took place from 5 to 13 October 2002 at Masan Gymnasium, Masan, South Korea.

== Schedule ==
All times are Korea Standard Time (UTC+09:00)

Date	Time	Event
Saturday, 5 October 2002	14:00	Preliminary
Wednesday, 9 October 2002	14:00	Quarterfinals
Saturday, 12 October 2002	14:00	Semifinals
Sunday, 13 October 2002	14:00	Final

== Results ==
Legend

- KO — Won by knockout
- RSC — Won by referee stop contest
- RSCO — Won by referee stop contest outclassed

Preliminary
Jitender Kumar (IND)	21
Ismael Faiala (PLE)	7
Choi Il-ryong (PRK)
Baurzhan Kairmenov (KAZ)	RSCO
Utkirbek Haydarov (UZB)	RSC
Abudoureheman (CHN)
Somchai Chimlun (THA)	RSCO
Md Nabab Ali (BAN)

Quarterfinals
Ahmed Ali Khan (PAK)	KO
Maraon Golez (PHI)
Khishigbaataryn Mandakhbayar (MGL)
Moon Young-seung (KOR)	RSCO
Jitender Kumar (IND)	7
Baurzhan Kairmenov (KAZ)	28
Utkirbek Haydarov (UZB)	RSCO
Somchai Chimlun (THA)

Semifinals
Ahmed Ali Khan (PAK)	RSCO
Moon Young-seung (KOR)
Baurzhan Kairmenov (KAZ)	18
Utkirbek Haydarov (UZB)	36

Final
Ahmed Ali Khan (PAK)
Utkirbek Haydarov (UZB)	RSCO
