= Taylor Mabika =

Gabonese boxer (born 1975)

Personal information
- Nationality: Gabonese
- Born: 29 January 1975 (age 50); Libreville, Gabon
- Height: 1.73 m (5 ft 8 in)

Sport
- Sport: Boxing

Taylor Mabika (born 29 January 1975) is a Gabonese professional boxer who held the African cruiserweight title from 2013 to 2014. As an amateur, he competed in the men's light heavyweight event at the 2004 Summer Olympics.

== Professional boxing record ==
28 fights	19 wins	7 losses
By knockout	10	2
By decision	9	5
Draws	2	

No.	Result	Record	Opponent	Type	Round, Time	Date	Age	Location	Notes
28	Loss	19–7–2	(Poland) Michal Cieslak	KO	6 (10) 2:45	5 Dec 2020	45 years, 311 days	(Poland) DoubleTree by Hilton Hotel Conference Centre, Warsaw	
27	Loss	19–6–2	(Poland) Mateusz Masternak	UD	10	19 Sep 2020	45 years, 234 days	(Poland) Arena Jaskolka, Tarnow	
26	Draw	19–5–2	(France) Engin Karakaplan	SD	8	29 Feb 2020	45 years, 31 days	(France) Salle Emy les près, Cormeilles-de-Parisis	
25	Loss	19–5–1	(Poland) Krzysztof Włodarczyk	UD	10	30 Nov 2019	44 years, 305 days	(Poland) Nosalowy Dwór, Zakopane	
24	Loss	19–4–1	(France) Herve Lofidi	SD	12	15 Jun 2019	44 years, 137 days	(France) Patinoire d'Amiens, Amiens	Lost WBC Francophone cruiserweight title
23	Loss	19–3–1	(Democratic Republic of the Congo) Ilunga Junior Makabu	RTD	4 (12) 3:00	25 Aug 2018	43 years, 208 days	(Democratic Republic of the Congo) Grand Hotêl de Kinshasa, Kinshasa	For WBC International cruiserweight title
22	Win	19–2–1	(Albania) Nuri Seferi	UD	12	8 Jun 2018	43 years, 130 days	(Gabon) Libreville	Won vacant WBC Francophone cruiserweight title
21	Win	18–2–1	(Latvia) Jevgenijs Stamburskis	KO	2 (8) ?	17 Feb 2018	43 years, 19 days	(France) Sally Emy les près, Cormeilles-en-Parisis	
20	Win	17–2–1	(Romania) Alexandru Jur	SD	12	17 Jun 2017	42 years, 139 days	(Gabon) Michel Essongue Sports Complex, Port-Gentil	Won WBC Mediterranean cruiserweight title
19	Win	16–2–1	(Algeria) Zine Eddine Benmakhlouf	SD	12	17 Dec 2016	41 years, 323 days	(Gabon) Stade de l'Amitié, Libreville	Won WBF cruiserweight title
18	Win	15–2–1	(Germany) Lars Buchholz	TKO	4 (10) 2:57	17 Jun 2016	41 years, 140 days	(Luxembourg) Centre Sportif Obercorn, Differdange	Won vacant WBF International cruiserweight title
17	Draw	14–2–1	(France) Sylvain Luce	SD	8	13 Feb 2016	41 years, 15 days	(France) Sally Emy les près, Cormeiles-en-Parisis	
16	Win	14–2	(Ukraine) Yuri Barashian	TKO	4 (8) ?	30 May 2015	40 years, 121 days	(Gabon) Libreville	
15	Win	13–2	(United States) Tyler Seever	TKO	3 (12) ?	31 Jan 2015	40 years, 2 days	Stadium Gabon, Libreville	Won vacant IBU cruiserweight title
14	Win	12–2	(Nigeria) Ekeng Henshaw	RTD	7 (12) 3:00	24 May 2014	39 years, 115 days	(Gabon) Gymnase du Prytanée militaire, Libreville	Retained ABU cruiserweight title
13	Win	11–2	(Ghana) Prince George Akrong	TKO	7 (12) 1:45	27 Dec 2013	38 years, 332 days	(Gabon) Gymnase du Prytanée militaire, Libreville	Won vacant ABU cruiserweight title
12	Win	10–2	(Albania) Nysret Sopaj	UD	8	8 Jun 2013	38 years, 130 days	(Luxembourg) Centre Sportif Obercorn, Differdange	Retained Luxembourg Cruiserweight title
11	Loss	9–2	(Poland) Krzysztof Glowacki	UD	8	20 Apr 2013	38 years, 81 days	(Poland) Hala na Podpromiu, Rzeszow	
10	Loss	9–1	(France) Arsen Goulamirian	UD	8	30 Mar 2013	38 years, 60 days	(France) Salle Jean Mace, Issoudun	
9	Win	9–0	(France) Marouan Larouiche	UD	6	16 Mar 2013	38 years, 46 days	(France) Salle des fetes, Cormeilles-en-Parisis	
8	Win	8–0	(Austria) Patrick Berger	UD	6	20 Jan 2012	36 years, 356 days	(Luxembourg) Rene Hartmann Center, Dudelange	
7	Win	7–0	(Germany) Marco Heinichen	TKO	9 (10) ?	3 Dec 2010	35 years, 308 days	(Luxembourg) Rene Hartmann Center, Dudelange	Won vacant Luxembourg cruiserweight title
6	Win	6–0	(Germany) Koeskal Orduhan	TKO	3 (6) ?	4 Nov 2010	35 years, 279 days	(Germany) Autohause Koenig, Tempelhof	
5	Win	5–0	(France) James Gregoire	TKO	4 (6) ?	5 Feb 2010	35 years, 7 days	(France) Salle des fetes, Cormeiles-en-Parisis	Bout stopped because of an Injury
4	Win	4–0	(Germany) Stan Johnson	UD	4	4 Dec 2009	34 years, 309 days	(Luxembourg) Rene Hartmann Center, Dudelange	
3	Win	3–0	(Germany) Ralf Sawetzki	UD	4	17 Apr 2009	34 years, 78 days	(Luxembourg) Rene Hartmann Center, Dudelange	
2	Win	2–0	(France) Jeremy Ouanna	PTS	4	7 Feb 2009	34 years, 9 days	(France) Cormeilles-en-Parisis, Val-d'Oise	
1	Win	1–0	(Poland) Piotr Pucikowski	TKO	(4) ?	20 Jul 2008	33 years, 143 days	(Luxembourg) Rene Hartmann Center, Dudelange	
