= Apti Davtaev =

Russian boxer

Apti Davtaev Апти Алхазурович Давтаев
Personal information
- Nationality: Russian
- Born: May 16, 1989 (age 37) Kurchaloy, Chechen-Ingush ASSR, Russian SFSR
- Height: 6 ft 5 in (196 cm)
- Weight: Heavyweight

Boxing career
- Reach: 78 1/2 in (199 cm)

Boxing record
- Total fights: 22
- Wins: 20
- Win by KO: 19
- Losses: 1
- Draws: 1

Apti Alkhazurovich Davtaev (Russian: Апти Алхазурович Давтаев) is a Russian professional boxer.

== Professional career ==
Davtaev made his professional debut on 30 March 2013, scoring a second-round stoppage victory via corner retirement (RTD) against Ivan Bogdanov at the Galich Hall in Krasnodar, Russia.

After winning his first eight fights, all by stoppage, he fought Ante Verunica to a split draw (SD) over six rounds on 18 October 2014. In his next fight he faced Jakov Gospic for the vacant WBC-CISBB heavyweight title on 11 July 2015 at the GETEC Arena in Magdeburg, Germany. Davtaev captured his first professional via second-round knockout (KO). The bout was part of the undercard of the WBA (Regular) heavyweight title fight between Ruslan Chagaev and Francesco Pianeta.

After scoring another five wins, four by stoppage, he faced German Skobenko for the vacant WBA Asia heavyweight title on 5 September 2018 at the Amphitheatre in Grozny, Russia. Davtaev defeated Skobenko via sixth-round technical knockout (TKO) to capture his second regional title by a major sanctioning body.

Following a first-round KO victory against Richard Carmack in February 2019, Davtaev defeated Pedro Otas via fifth-round KO to capture the WBC-ABC Continental heavyweight title. The bout took place on 18 April at the Colosseum Sport Hall in Grozny.

== Professional boxing record ==
22 fights	20 wins	1 loss
By knockout	19	1
By decision	1	0
Draws	1	

No.	Result	Record	Opponent	Type	Round, time	Date	Location	Notes
22	Loss	20–1–1	Jack Mulowayi	TKO	8 (10), 0:19	8 Apr 2021	Grozny, Russia	Lost WBC-ABC Continental heavyweight title
21	Win	20–0–1	John Napari	KO	2 (10), 1:05	21 Feb 2020	Dynamo Palace of Sports, Moscow, Russia	Retained WBC-ABC Continental heavyweight title
20	Win	19–0–1	Keith Barr	TKO	3 (8), 0:38	10 Jan 2020	Ocean Casino Resort, Atlantic City, New Jersey, US	
19	Win	18–0–1	Daniel Martz	TKO	1 (10), 1:09	19 Sep 2019	Uvays Akhtayev Stadium, Grozny, Russia	Retained WBC-ABC Continental heavyweight title
18	Win	17–0–1	Pedro Otas	KO	5 (10), 1:18	18 Apr 2019	Colosseum Sport Hall, Grozny, Russia	Won WBC-ABC Continental heavyweight title
17	Win	16–0–1	Richard Carmack	KO	1 (10), 2:26	15 Feb 2019	Kansas Star Arena, Mulvane, Kansas, US	
16	Win	15–0–1	German Skobenko	TKO	6 (10), 2:48	5 Sep 2018	Amphitheatre, Grozny, Russia	Won vacant WBA Asia heavyweight title
15	Win	14–0–1	Cory Phelps	TKO	2 (8), 1:17	22 Jun 2018	Masonic Temple, Detroit, Michigan, US	
14	Win	13–0–1	Garrett Wilson	UD	6	12 Jan 2018	Turning Stone Resort Casino, Verona, New York, US	
13	Win	12–0–1	Talgat Dosanov	TKO	1 (10)	28 May 2016	Sport Palace "Uzbekiston", Tashkent, Uzbekistan	
12	Win	11–0–1	Davit Gorgiladze	TKO	1 (6), 0:44	5 Mar 2016	Colosseum Sport Hall, Grozny, Russia	
11	Win	10–0–1	Sherzod Mamajonov	TKO	3 (8), 1:11	26 Dec 2015	Colosseum Sport Hall, Grozny, Russia	
10	Win	9–0–1	Jakov Gospic	KO	2 (10), 1:55	11 Jul 2015	GETEC Arena, Magdeburg, Germany	Won vacant WBC-CISBB heavyweight title
9	Draw	8–0–1	Ante Verunica	SD	6	18 Oct 2014	Express, Rostov-on-Don, Russia	
8	Win	8–0	Andrey Zapisov	RTD	2 (4), 3:00	5 Sep 2014	Boxing Gym, Krasnodar, Russia	
7	Win	7–0	Oleksandr Nesterenko	KO	1 (6), 0:34	6 Jul 2014	Akhmat-Arena, Grozny, Russia	
6	Win	6–0	Roman Mirzoev	KO	1 (4), 2:27	23 May 2014	Basket-Hall, Krasnodar, Russia	
5	Win	5–0	Oleksandr Pritula	KO	2 (4), 2:45	8 Feb 2014	Club "Fight Glove", Rostov-on-Don, Russia	
4	Win	4–0	Frantisek Kynkal	TKO	1 (6), 0:29	30 Nov 2013	Olympic Sports Complex, Grozny, Russia	
3	Win	3–0	Vyacheslav Shcherbakov	TKO	1 (4), 2:39	26 Oct 2013	Express, Rostov-on-Don, Russia	
2	Win	2–0	Semen Pakhomov	KO	1 (4), 2:16	27 Jul 2013	Trade And Entertainment Centre "Moskva", Kaspiysk, Russia	
1	Win	1–0	Ivan Bogdanov	RTD	2 (4), 3:00	30 Mar 2013	Galich Hall, Krasnodar, Russia	
