= Trevor Stewardson =

Canadian boxer (born 1977)

- Born: March 28, 1977 (age 49); Thunder Bay, Ontario
- Nationality: Canadian

Mixed martial arts record
- Total: 7
- Wins: 5
- By knockout: 5
- Losses: 2
- By submission: 1
- By decision: 1

Other information
- Mixed martial arts record from Sherdog

Trevor Stewardson (born March 28, 1977, in) is a Canadian boxer, competing in the light heavyweight (– 81 kg) division. He represented Canada at the 2004 Summer Olympics in Athens, Greece. He was eliminated in the second round by Ahmed Ismail of Egypt who went on to win the bronze medal. He qualified for the Olympic Games by placing second at the 2nd AIBA American 2004 Olympic Qualifying Tournament in Rio de Janeiro, Brazil.

Stewardson moved to Medicine Hat, Alta. in the leadup to the Olympics but was almost denied entry to the 2004 Games because of miscommunication between him and Boxing Canada. Stewardson's camp appealed the Canadian Olympic Committee's initial decision not to have Stewardson on the team and won the appeal just weeks before the Games were to begin.

In 1998, he won a bronze medal in the 1998 Commonwealth Games at Kuala Lumpur, Malaysia.

Since Athens Stewardson has remained in Medicine Hat and in 2008 began a pro career in mixed martial arts. He won his first bout April 26 at an event called Urban Conflict at the Calgary Corral, defeating London, Ont. native Jacob McDonald with a knockout 39 seconds into the first round. His second fight, July 19 at King of the Cage Canada's Excalibur event at Rexall Place in Edmonton, Alta., was against Vancouver, B.C. native Marcus Hicks. Stewardson won that fight by way of knockout at the 3:25 mark of the first round.

On August 27, 2009, Stewardson is slated to make his pro boxing debut against AJ Bone at a card in Taber, Alta.

== Mixed martial arts record ==
Professional record breakdown
7 matches	5 wins	2 losses
By knockout	5	0
By submission	0	1
By decision	0	1

Res.	Record	Opponent	Method	Event	Date	Round	Time	Location	Notes
Loss	5-2	Jason Day	Submission (twister)	Rumble in the Cage 35	June 6, 2009	2	4:12	Lethbridge, Alberta, Canada	
Win	5-1	Jason Volpe	TKO (punches)	King Of The Cage Canada: Turbulence	March 13, 2009	1	0:26	Edmonton, Alberta, Canada	
Win	4-1	Geoffrey Chambers	KO (punch)	King Of The Cage Canada: Grinder	November 28, 2008	1	1:27	Calgary, Alberta	
Win	3-1	Brendan Seguin	TKO (punches)	Raw Combat: Redemption	October 25, 2008	3	2:03	Calgary, Alberta, Canada	
Loss	2-1	Nick Hinchliffe	Decision (unanimous)	King Of The Cage Canada: Unrefined	September 18, 2008	3	5:00	Edmonton, Alberta, Canada	
Win	2-0	Marcus Hicks	TKO (punches)	King Of The Cage Canada: Excalibur	July 19, 2008	1	3:25	Edmonton, Alberta, Canada	
Win	1-0	Jacob MacDonald	TKO (punches)	Fighters Nation: Urban Conflict	April 26, 2008	1	0:39	Edmonton, Alberta, Canada	
