= 2003 African Amateur Boxing Championships =

Boxing competitions

- Host city: Yaounde
- Country: Cameroon
- Dates: May 9–18, 2003

The 12th edition of the African Amateur Boxing Championships were held in Yaoundé, Cameroon from May 9 to May 18, 2003. The event was organised by the African governing body for amateur boxing, the African Boxing Confederation (ABC).

== Medal winners ==
EVENT	GOLD	SILVER
Light Flyweight (– 48 kilograms)	Anicet Rasoanaivo (MAD)	Jonah Ramasia (BOT)
Flyweight (– 51 kilograms)	Hicham Mesbahi (MAR)	Lechedzani Luza (BOT)
Bantamweight (– 54 kilograms)	Malik Bouziane (ALG)	Bruno Julie (MRI)
Featherweight (– 57 kilograms)	Yakubu Amidu (GHA)	Hadj Belkhir (ALG)
Lightweight (– 60 kilograms)	Tahar Tamsamani (MAR)	Hocine Ziani (ALG)
Light Welterweight (– 64 kilograms)	Mohamed Allalou (ALG)	Sipho Mwelase (RSA)
Welterweight (– 69 kilograms)	Benamar Meskine (ALG)	Seroba Binda (BOT)
Middleweight (– 75 kilograms)	Hassan N'Dam N'Jikam (CMR)	Muleba Mbilo (COD)
Light Heavyweight (– 81 kilograms)	Pasteur Mbuyi (COD)	Mohamed Akli Amari (ALG)
Heavyweight (– 91 kilograms)	Parfait Amougou (CMR)	Tony Eleftheriou (RSA)
Super Heavyweight (+ 91 kilograms)	Carlos Takam (CMR)	Michael Macaque (MRI)

== See also ==
- Boxing at the 2003 All-Africa Games
