= Geard Ajetović =

Serbian boxer (born 1981)

Personal information
- Born: 28 February 1981 (age 45) Beočin, Yugoslavia
Medal record
Men's Boxing
Representing Serbia
Mediterranean Games
Bronze medal – third place	2001 Tunis	Welterweight

Geard Ajetović (born 28 February 1981) is a Serbian boxer. He represented Serbia and Montenegro at the 2000 Summer Olympics in Sydney, Australia, where he lost in the first round of the Men's Welterweight (– 67 kg) competition to Thailand's veteran Parkpoom Jangphonak due to a controversial 9-9 point decision. Ajetović won a bronze medal at the 2001 Mediterranean Games in Tunis, Tunisia.

== Biography ==
Geard Ajetović grew up in the former Republic of Yugoslavia and started boxing at the age of 8. After a successful amateur career including numerous national championships, a gold medal at the Junior European Championships and silver at the Junior World Championships he turned professional in 2000 soon after the Olympic Games. He moved to Liverpool where he spent the first 10 years of his professional career. Due to a knee injury Ajetović was forced to a take a 2-year break from fighting, but had a successful comeback at the end of 2010. In January 2011 Ajetović won the vacant WBC Mediterranean title by a first-round knockout victory over Jackson Chanet, having moving up to light heavyweight for that fight.

== Professional record ==
59 fights	31 wins	26 losses
By knockout	16	1
By decision	15	25
Draws	2	
No contests	0	

No.	Result	Record	Opponent	Type	Round, time	Date	Location	Notes
59	Loss	31-26-2	(Croatia) Luka Plantic	RTD	3 (8) 3:00	2022-02-19	Hamburg, Germany	
58	Loss	31-25-2	(Germany) Emre Cukur	Decision (Unanimous)	10	2021-06-19	Munich, Germany	
57	Loss	31-24-2	(Poland) Paweł Stępień	Decision (Unanimous)	8	2020-03-07	Łomża, Poland	
56	Draw	31-23-2	(Switzerland) Marzio Franscella	Decision (Majority)	6	2019-12-14	Fribourg, Switzerland	
55	Loss	31-23-1	(France) Gustave Tamba	Decision (Unanimous)	8	2019-06-29	Fréjus, France	
54	Loss	31-22-1	(Hungary) Mate Kis	Decision (Unanimous)	8	2019-06-01	Várpalota, Hungary	
53	Loss	31-21-1	(Belgium) Timur Nikarkhoev	Decision (Unanimous)	8	2019-05-04	Charleroi, Belgium	
52	Loss	31-20-1	(Italy) Dragan Lepei	PTS	6	2019-02-06	Florence, Italy	
51	Loss	31-19-1	(Switzerland) Yoann Kongolo	Decision (Unanimous)	6	2018-12-26	(Switzerland) Bern, Swiderland	
50	Loss	31-18-1	(United Kingdom) Zach Parker	Decision (Unanimous)	8	2018-07-14	Offenburg, Germany	
49	Loss	31-17-1	(Australia) Sakio Bika	Decision (Unanimous)	12	2017-10-22	Sydney, Australia	For vacant WBC International Silver super middleweight title
48	Win	31-16-1	(Serbia) Aleksander Zikov Aksin	KO	1 (6) 1:05	2017-09-17	Kulpin, Serbia	
47	Loss	30-16-1	(Russia) Andrey Sirotkin	Decision (Unanimous)	10	2017-08-18	Plastunovskaya, Russia	For vacant WBO European super middleweight title
46	Win	30-15-1	(Russia) Khaybula Madzhidov	Decision (Unanimous)	10	2017-06-03	Rostov-on-Don, Russia	Won vacant WBC CISBB super middleweight title
45	Win	29-15-1	(Georgia (country)) Tornike Gikashvili	KO	3 (8) 0:43	2017-02-11	Düsseldorf, Germany	
44	Win	28-15-1	(Bosnia and Herzegovina) Adil Rusidi	TKO	1 (8) 1:51	2016-04-02	Düsseldorf, Germany	
43	Loss	27-15-1	(Tanzania) Francis Cheka	Decision (Unanimous)	12	2016-02-27	Dar-Es-Salaam, Tanzania	For vacant WBF Inter-continental super middleweight title
42	Win	27-14-1	(Poland) Michal Gerlecki	TKO	(10) 1:19	2015-10-23	Białystok, Poland	Won vacant Republic of Poland International light heavyweight title
41	Loss	26-14-1	(Germany) Moritz Stahl	Decision (Unanimous)	8	2015-09-19	Leipzig, Germany	
40	Loss	26-13-1	(Russia) Dmitrii Chudinov	Decision (Unanimous)	8	2015-08-23	Russia	
39	Loss	26-12-1	(Finland) Niklas Rasanen	Decision (Unanimous)	8	2015-08-08	Savonlinna, Finland	
38	Loss	26-11-1	(Kyrgyzstan) Dilmurod Satybaldiev	Decision (Unanimous)	12	2015-04-05	Noginsk, Russia	For vacant WBC CISBB super middleweight title
37	Win	26-10-1	(Serbia) Aleksander Petrovic	PTS	4	2014-12-07	Bečej, Serbia	
36	Loss	25-10-1	(Italy) Giovanni De Carolis	Decision (Unanimous)	12	2014-11-01	Roma, Italy	For vacant IBF Inter-continental super middleweight title
35	Win	25-9-1	(Ukraine) Vycheslav Uzelkov	Decision (Split)	8	2014-04-12	Brovary, Ukraine	
34	Win	24-9-1	(Bosnia and Herzegovina) Jaser Malagic	KO	1 (8)	2013-12-28	Novi Pazar, Serbia	
33	Loss	23-9-1	(Namibia) Harry Simon	Decision (Unanimous)	12	2013-09-28	Windhoek, Namibia	For vacant IBF International light heavyweight title
32	Win	23-8-1	(Poland) Przemyslaw Opalach	Decision (Unanimous)	12	2013-05-10	Olsztyn, Poland	Won vacant IBF International super middleweight title
31	Win	22-8-1	(France) Abdelkhaim Derghal	KO	3 (12) 1:52	2013-04-06	Novi Sad, Serbia	Won vacant WBO European super middleweight title
30	Loss	21-8-1	(Russia) Maxim Vlasov	Decision (Unanimous)	10	2012-12-30	Moscow, Russia	
29	Win	21-7-1	(Germany) Chris Matufa	TKO	4 (12) 2:25	2012-09-28	Göttingen, Germany	Won vacant WBO European super middleweight title
28	Win	20-7-1	(Romania) Ionut Trandafir	PTS	6	2012-07-07	Winterhude, Germany	
27	Loss	19-7-1	(Poland) Piotr Wilczewski	Decision (Split)	8	2012-02-17	Olsztyn, Poland	
26	Loss	19-6-1	(Croatia) Ante Bilic	Decision (Majority)	8	2011-11-18	Cuxhaven, Germany	
25	Win	19-5-1	(Germany) Christian Pawlak	Decision (Split)	8	2011-10-15	Velten, Germany	
24	Loss	18-5-1	(Poland) Grzegorz Soszynski	Decision (Majority)	12	2011-04-09	Alsterdorf, Germany	Lost WBC Mediterranean Light Heavyweight belt
23	Win	18-4-1	(France) Jackson Chanet	KO	1 (12)	2011-01-07	Marne, France	Won vacant WBC Mediterranean Light Heavyweight title
22	Win	17-4-1	(Romania) Eugen Stan	Decision (Unanimous)	4	2010-11-27	Liège, Belgium	
21	Loss	16-4-1	(Republic of Ireland) Matthew Macklin	PTS	10	2008-10-31	Aston Villa, United Kingdom	
20	Loss	16-3-1	(Russia) Dmitry Pirog	Decision (Unanimous)	10	2008-07-19	Moscow, Russia	
19	Loss	16-2-1	(Australia) Daniel Geale	Decision (Unanimous)	12	2008-06-27	Sydney, Australia	For IBO middleweight title
18	Win	16-1-1	(Tanzania) Francis Cheka	PTS	8	2008-02-08	Durham, United Kingdom	
17	Win	15-1-1	(Uganda) Joey Vegas	TKO	4 (6) 0:39	2007-11-14	London, United Kingdom	
16	Win	14-1-1	(United Kingdom) Patrick J. Maxwell	TKO	3 (6) 2:24	2007-07-13	Barnsley, United Kingdom	
15	Win	13-1-1	(France) Robert Roselia	Decision (Split)	10	2007-05-29	Eure, France	
14	Draw	12-1-1	(United Kingdom) Patrick J. Maxwell	PTS	6	2007-04-27	London, United Kingdom	
13	Win	12-1	(Iran) Manoocha Salari	TKO	4 (6)	2006-05-13	Sheffield, United Kingdom	
12	Loss	11-1	(France) Christophe Cancluax	Decision (Unanimous)	8	2006-03-18	Monte Carlo, Monaco	
11	Win	11-0	(France) Magid Ben Driss	PTS	8	2005-11-26	Sheffield, United Kingdom	
10	Win	10-0	(United Kingdom) Jason Collins	TKO	(6) 2:17	2005-10-14	Huddersfield, United Kingdom	
9	Win	9-0	(United Kingdom) Conroy McIntosh	PTS	6	2005-07-24	Sheffield, United Kingdom	
8	Win	8-0	(Belarus) Dzmitri Yanushevich	TKO	(4) 1:19	2005-01-21	London, United Kingdom	
7	Win	7-0	(United Kingdom) Conroy McIntosh	Decision (Unanimous)	6	2004-12-10	Sheffield, United Kingdom	
6	Win	6-0	(Russia) Dmitry Donetsky	Decision (Unanimous)	6	2005-05-12	Reading, United Kingdom	
5	Win	5-0	(Brazil) Tomas Da Silva	TKO	(4) 1:44	2004-02-06	Sheffield, United Kingdom	
4	Win	4-0	(United Kingdom) Joel Ani	RTD	1 (6) 3:00	2003-11-07	Sheffield, United Kingdom	
3	Win	3-0	(United Kingdom) Gary Beardsley	TKO	3 (6) 2:08	2003-09-26	Reading, United Kingdom	
2	Win	2-0	(England) Jason Samuels	PTS	4	May 17, 2003	(England) Everton Park Sports Centre, Liverpool, Merseyside	
1	Win	1-0	(England) Ojay Abrahams	PTS	4	Apr 19, 2003	(England) Everton Park Sports Centre, Liverpool, Merseyside	Professional debut
