= Isaac Ekpo =

Nigerian boxer (born 1982)

Personal information
- Nickname: Grenade
- Nationality: Nigerian
- Born: 22 October 1982 (age 43) Abuja, Nigeria
- Height: 1.82 m (6 ft 0 in)
- Weight: Super-middleweight

Boxing career
- Stance: Orthodox

Boxing record
- Total fights: 40
- Wins: 33
- Win by KO: 26
- Losses: 7

Isaac Ekpo
Medal record

Representing Nigeria

Men's Boxing

All-Africa Games
Silver medal – second place	2003 Abuja	Light Heavyweight

Isaac Ekpo (born 22 October 1982) is a Nigerian professional boxer who has challenged three times for a super-middleweight world title between 2013 and 2018. He held the Commonwealth super-middleweight title in 2014. As an amateur, Ekpo competed at the 2004 Summer Olympics.

== Amateur career ==
In 2004, Ekpo was a member of the Nigerian Olympic team, and was defeated in the first round by Utkirbek Haydarov from Uzbekistan.

== Professional career ==
Ekpo challenged WBO super-middleweight champion Robert Stieglitz at Messehalle in Leipzig, Germany, on 19 October 2013, but lost via unanimous decision.

He defeated Peter Ato Ricketts by unanimous decision to win the vacant Commonwealth super-middleweight title at Aborigines Beach Resort in Keta, Ghana, on 28 June 2014.

Ekpo challenged WBA (Regular) super-middleweight champion Tyron Zeuge at MBS Arena in Potsdam, Germany, on 25 March 2017, losing by technical decision having been behind on all three judges' scorecards when the fight was stopped in the fifth round because of a cut sustained by Zeuge in an accidental clash of heads. A rematch took place at Edel-optics.de Arena in Hamburg, Germany, on 24 March 2018, with Ekpo being defeated via technical knockout in the second round.
