= Boxing at the 2003 All-Africa Games =

Boxing competitions

Boxing at the 8th All Africa Games was held in Abuja, Nigeria from October 4-13, 2003. It served as a qualification tournament for the 2004 Summer Olympics in Athens, Greece. The number one and two earned a ticket for the Olympic tournament.

A total number of 182 fighters from 27 countries did participate in Abuja, Nigeria, with the host country (four gold, three silver, no bronze) as the overall-winner before Egypt (three gold, two silver, two bronze) and Algeria (two gold, one silver, four bronze). All the finalists got quotes for the 2004 Summer Olympics. Two more qualification tournaments followed afterwards on the African continent: in Casablanca, Morocco (January 15 to January 22, 2004) and in Gaborone, Botswana (March 15 to March 22, 2004).

== Medal winners ==
| EVENT | GOLD | SILVER | BRONZE |
|---|---|---|---|
| Light Flyweight (– 48 kilograms) | Suleiman Bilali; Kenya | Endalkachew Kebede; Ethiopia | Joseph Jermia; Namibia Jolly Katongole; Uganda |
| Flyweight (– 51 kilograms) | Walid Cherif; Tunisia | Paulus Ambunda; Namibia | Mebarek Soltani; Algeria Adebellahim Mohamed; Egypt |
| Bantamweight (– 54 kilograms) | Malik Bouziane; Algeria | Nestor Bolum; Nigeria | Lankwe Wilson; Ghana David Munyasia; Kenya |
| Featherweight (– 57 kilograms) | Hadj Belkheir; Algeria | Muideen Ganiyu; Nigeria | Ayman Mohamed; Egypt Daniel Tadele; Ethiopia |
| Lightweight (– 60 kilograms) | Ahmed Sadiq; Nigeria | Bongani Mahlangu; South Africa | Perel Rivan; Cameroon Esayas Getaneh; Ethiopia |
| Light Welterweight (– 64 kilograms) | Davidson Emenogu; Nigeria | Nasserredine Fillali; Algeria | Davis Mwale; Zambia Sadat Tebazaalwa; Uganda |
| Welterweight (– 69 kilograms) | Mohamed Hikal; Egypt | Zakaria Nefzi; Tunisia | Benamar Meskine; Algeria Ellis Chibuye; Zambia |
| Middleweight (– 75 kilograms) | Ramadan Yasser; Egypt | Hassan N'Dam N'Jikam; Cameroon | Daniel Shisia; Kenya Nabil Kassel; Algeria |
| Light Heavyweight (– 81 kilograms) | Ahmed Ismail; Egypt | Isaac Ekpo; Nigeria | Abdelhani Kenzi; Algeria Sibiri Kabore; Burundi |
| Heavyweight (– 91 kilograms) | Emmanuel Izonritei; Nigeria | Mohamed El-Sayed; Egypt | Apostolos Eleftheriou; South Africa Parfait Amougou; Cameroon |
| Super Heavyweight (+ 91 kilograms) | Gbenga Oloukun; Nigeria | Mohamed Aly; Egypt | Carlos Takam; Cameroon Gregorio Manuel; Angola |

== See also ==
- 2003 African Amateur Boxing Championships
- Boxing at the 2004 Summer Olympics
