= Boxing at the 2001 Mediterranean Games =

- Location: Tunis, Tunisia
- Dates: 3–8 September 2001

The Boxing Tournament at the 2001 Mediterranean Games was held in Tunis, Tunisia from September 6 to September 8.

== Medal winners ==
| Event | Gold | Silver | Bronze |
|---|---|---|---|
| Light Flyweight (– 48 kilograms) | Abdülkadir Koçak; Turkey | Amjad Aouda; Algeria | Walid Cherif; Tunisia; Rudik Kazandjian; Cyprus |
| Flyweight (– 51 kilograms) | Mebarek Soltani; Algeria | Mohamed Rezkalla; Egypt | Jérôme Thomas; France; Moez Zemzeni; Tunisia |
| Bantamweight (– 54 kilograms) | Ağasi Agagüloğlu; Turkey | Hassan Djlassi; Tunisia | Artur Mikaelyan; Greece; Abdullah Waheb; Syria |
| Featherweight (– 57 kilograms) | Ramaz Paliani; Turkey | Driss Melki; Tunisia | Jetis Bajrami; Croatia; Boubacar Dangnoko; France |
| Lightweight (– 60 kilograms) | Zied Sassi; Tunisia | Yussuf Hamidi; Syria | Michele di Rocco; Italy; Guillaume Salingue; France |
| Light Welterweight (– 63.5 kilograms) | Saleh Khalaf Abdelbary; Egypt | Willy Blain; France | Mohamed Ali Sassi; Tunisia; Mohamed Allalou; Algeria |
| Welterweight (– 67 kilograms) | Xavier Noël; France | Sami Khelifi; Tunisia | Spyridon Ioannidis; Greece (Federal Republic of Yugoslavia) Geard Ajetović; Yugoslavia |
| Light Middleweight (– 71 kilograms) | Bülent Ulusoy; Turkey | Benamar Meskine; Algeria | Georgios Gazis; Greece; Mohamed Marmouri; Tunisia |
| Middleweight (– 75 kilograms) | Ramadan Yasser; Egypt | Fırat Karagöllü; Turkey | Mourad Ouhichi; Tunisia; Mamadou Diambang; France |
| Light Heavyweight (– 81 kilograms) | Mourad Sahraoui; Tunisia | İhsan Yıldırım Tarhan; Turkey | Antonio Brillantino; Italy; Ahmed Ismail; Egypt |
| Heavyweight (– 91 kilograms) | (Federal Republic of Yugoslavia) Milorad Gajović; Yugoslavia | Omar Bellaouati; France | Mohamed Homrani; Tunisia; Ahmet Aksu; Turkey |
| Super Heavyweight (+ 91 kilograms) | Sami Jendoubi; Tunisia | Ahmed Wattar; Syria | Mehdi Aouiche; France (Federal Republic of Yugoslavia) Aleksandar Pejanović; Yugoslavia |

== Medal table ==
| Place | Nation | 1st place, gold medalist(s) | 2nd place, silver medalist(s) | 3rd place, bronze medalist(s) | Total |
|---|---|---|---|---|---|
| 1 | Turkey | 4 | 2 | 1 | 7 |
| 2 | Tunisia | 3 | 3 | 6 | 12 |
| 3 | Egypt | 2 | 1 | 1 | 4 |
| 4 | France | 1 | 2 | 5 | 8 |
| 5 | Algeria | 1 | 2 | 1 | 4 |
| 6 | Yugoslavia | 1 | 0 | 2 | 3 |
| 7 | Syria | 0 | 2 | 1 | 3 |
| 8 | Greece | 0 | 0 | 3 | 3 |
| 9 | Italy | 0 | 0 | 2 | 2 |
| 10 | Croatia | 0 | 0 | 1 | 1 |
| 10 | Cyprus | 0 | 0 | 1 | 1 |
| Total | | 12 | 12 | 24 | 48 |
