= Brian Mayanja =

Ugandan boxer

Brian Mayanja (born January 25, 1983) is a Ugandan boxer who competed at the 2004 Summer Olympics. He was outscored in the first round of the Featherweight (57 kg) division by Kazakhstan's Galib Jafarov.

Mayanja qualified for the Athens Games by winning the silver medal at the 1st AIBA African 2004 Olympic Qualifying Tournament in Casablanca. In the finale of the event, he lost to Tunisian fighter Saifeddine Nejmaoui.
