= Braimah Kamoko =

Ghanaian boxer (born 1980)

Personal information
- Nickname: Bukom Banku
- Nationality: Ghana
- Born: Isaac Braimah Kamoko; 17 August 1980 (age 46) Accra, Ghana
- Height: 5 ft 10 in (178 cm)
- Weight: Super heavyweight

Boxing career
- Stance: Orthodox

Boxing record
- Total fights: 30
- Wins: 29
- Win by KO: 21
- Losses: 1
- Draws: 0
- No contests: 0

Braimah Isaac Kamoko also known as Bukom Banku (born 17 August 1980) is a Ghanaian professional boxer who until 20 October 2017 had an undefeated record of 28-0-0 (21 K0). However, on 21 October 2017, he suffered a TKO defeat to Bastie Samir at the Bukom Boxing Arena in Accra, Ghana, in a seventh round. On 7 September 2019, he defeated Rojhat Bilgetekin of Germany in the 3rd round at St George Hall in Bradford in the United Kingdom.

== Professional career ==
=== Heavyweight ===
Braimah first rose to prominence by winning a bronze medal in the Heavyweight 1999 All-Africa Games organized in Johannesburg, South Africa in September 1999.

==== Inactivity ====
Kamoko won the WBO Africa Light Heavyweight title in 2011, and the WBO Africa Cruiserweight title in 2012. However, Kamoko suffered from periods of inactivity, leading up to his lost to Samir in 2017.

==== Revocation of license ====
In November 2019, the Ghana Boxing Association revoked his boxing license for breaching the contract he had with Box Office Promotions to engage in a rematch with Bastie Samir. The bout was scheduled to happen on 20 June 2018. He was asked to pay GH¢17,000 to the CEO of Box Office Promotions to defray the cost of part of his training allowance and the purse.

==== Television ====
In May 2020, the 'Bukom Banku Live' show was launched on GhOne TV, with him as the host.

== Personal life ==
Braimah has 12 children. He has a son called Abubakar Kamoko who is also a boxer.
