= Bahodirjon Sultonov =

Uzbek boxer (born 1985)

Bahodirjon Sooltonov
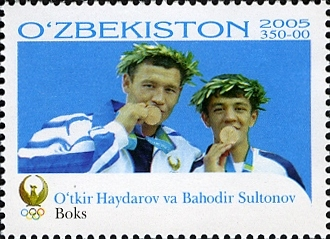

Personal information
- Full name: Bakhodirdzhon Sultanov
- Nationality: Uzbekistan
- Born: January 15, 1985 (age 41)
- Height: 1.66 m (5 ft 5 in)
- Weight: 57 kg (126 lb)

Sport
- Sport: Boxing
- Weight class: Featherweight
Medal record
Olympic Games
Bronze medal – third place	2004 Athens	Bantamweight
World Amateur Championships
Bronze medal – third place	2003 Bangkok	Bantamweight
Bronze medal – third place	2009 Milan	Featherweight
Asian Games
Gold medal – first place	2006 Doha	Featherweight
Asian Championships
Gold medal – first place	2004 Puerto Princesa	Bantamweight

Bahodirjon Sooltonov (Баходирджон Султанов; born January 15, 1985, in Andijan) is an Uzbekistani boxer who competed in the bantamweight (54 kg) division at the 2004 Summer Olympics and won the bronze medal.

== Career ==
At bantamweight he won bronze 2003 losing to Russia's Gennadi Kovalev. He qualified for the Athens Games by winning the gold medal at the 2004 Asian Amateur Boxing Championships in Puerto Princesa, Philippines. In the final he defeated Kyrgyzstan's Aybek Abdymomunov.

Sooltonov won the gold medal at featherweight at the 2006 Asian Games in Doha beating Olympic silver medalist Kim Song Guk in the semifinal and Zorigtbaataryn Enkhzorig.

At the world championships 2007 he lost to eventual Russian winner Albert Selimov and didn't medal.

=== Olympic Results 2004 ===
2004 (as a bantamweight)

- 1st round bye
- Defeated Andrzej Liczik (Poland) RSC 2 (1:28)
- Defeated Andrew Kooner (Canada) 44–32
- Lost to Guillermo Rigondeaux Ortiz (Cuba) 13–27, southpaw Rigondeaux scored a knockdown

=== Olympic Results 2008 ===
- Defeated Anthresh Lalit Lakra (India) 9–5
- Lost to Vasyl Lomachenko (Ukraine) 1–13

=== World amateur championships results ===
2003 (as a bantamweight)

- Defeated Ibrahim Aydogan (Turkey) RSCO 2
- Defeated Waldemar Cucereanu (Romania) 21–10
- Defeated Han Sung-Moon (South Korea) 37–19
- Lost to Gennady Kovalev (Russia) 15–21 (placed third)

2005 (as a bantamweight)

- Defeated Mirzhan Rakhimzhanov (Kazakhstan) 26–18
- Defeated Zsolt Bedak (Hungary) 41–23
- Defeated Kim Won-Guk (North Korea) 36–19
- Lost to Guillermo Rigondeaux (Cuba) RSCO

2007 (as a featherweight)

- Defeated Jesús Cuéllar (Argentina) 31–13
- Defeated Han Song-Ryong (North Korea) 31–8
- Lost to Albert Selimov (Russia) 9–24
