= Redouane Bouchtouk =

Moroccan boxer

Personal information
- Full name: Redouane Bouchtouk
- Nationality: Morocco
- Born: December 19, 1976 (age 49)
- Height: 1.65 m (5 ft 5 in)
- Weight: 48 kg (106 lb)

Sport
- Sport: Boxing
- Weight class: Light Flyweight

Redouane Bouchtouk (born December 19, 1976) is a boxer from Morocco who participated in the 2004 Summer Olympics for his native North African country. At these games he was stopped in the first round of the Light Flyweight (48 kg) division by Colombia's Carlos José Tamara. He then qualified for the Athens Games by winning the silver medal at the 1st AIBA African 2004 Olympic Qualifying Tournament in Casablanca, Morocco. In the final of the event he lost to Ugandan fighter Jolly Katongole.

At the first qualifier for the 2008 Summer Olympics he lost to Japhet Uutoni. At his second try he qualified for the Beijing Games, too, even though he lost in the final round to Thomas Essomba. In Beijing he lost his only bout to Paulo Carvalho.
