= Aybek Abdymomunov =

Kyrgyzstani boxer (born 1985)

Personal information
- Full name: Айбек Абдымомунов
- Nationality: Kyrgyzstan
- Born: December 20, 1985 (age 40)
- Height: 1.62 m (5 ft 4 in)
- Weight: 54 kg (119 lb)

Sport
- Sport: Boxing
- Weight class: Bantamweight
Medal record
Asian Championships
Silver medal – second place	2004 Puerto Princesa	Bantamweight

Aybek Abdymomunov (born December 20, 1985) is a male amateur boxer from Kyrgyzstan. He qualified to compete at the 2004 Summer Olympics in the bantamweight division (– 54 kg)where he lost in the first round to Pakistan's Mehrullah Lassi.

Abdymomunov qualified for the 2004 Athens Games as a bantamweight by ending up in second place at the 2004 Asian Championships in Puerto Princesa. In the final he lost to Uzbekistan's Bahodirjon Sooltonov.
