= Abdelhani Kenzi =

Algerian boxer (born 1973)

Medal record

Representing Algeria

Men's Boxing

All-Africa Games
Bronze medal – third place	2003 Abuja	Light Heavyweight

Abdel Hani Kenzi (born 27 September 1973) is a boxer from Algeria.

== Career ==
Kenzi participated in the 2004 Summer Olympics for his native North African country. There, he was stopped in the second round of the Light heavyweight (81 kg) division by Uzbekistan's eventual bronze medalist, Utkirbek Haydarov. He had formerly competed in the 2000 Summer Olympics.

Kenzi qualified for the Athens Games by winning the gold medal at the 1st AIBA African 2004 Olympic Qualifying Tournament in Casablanca, Morocco. In the final of the event, he defeated the Cape Verdian fighter, Flavio Furtado.

Kenzi won the bronze medal in the same division one year earlier, at the All-Africa Games in Abuja, Nigeria.
