= Noureddine Madjhoud =

Algerian boxer (born 1975)

Personal information
- Nationality: Algerian
- Born: 24 December 1975 (age 49)

Sport
- Sport: Boxing

Noureddine Madjhoud (born 24 December 1975) is an Algerian boxer. He competed at the 1996 Summer Olympics and the 2000 Summer Olympics.
