= David Munyasia =

Kenyan boxer

Medal record

Representing Kenya

Men's Boxing

All-Africa Games
Bronze medal – third place	2003 Abuja	Bantamweight

David Munyasia, a Kenyan boxer, was the first athlete to be found in violation of International Olympic Committee anti-doping rules at the 2004 Summer Olympics in Athens.

On 10 August 2004, the IOC announced that Munyasia, a bantamweight, had tested positive for cathine on 6 August. Four times the allowed limit of 5 micrograms per milliliter was found to be present in Munyasia's urine. He was immediately barred from participating in the Games. Munyasia confessed he was regular user of miraa (qat), a popular stimulant in Kenya.

One year earlier, he won the silver medal in the bantamweight division at the All-Africa Games in Abuja, Nigeria. He qualified for the Athens Games by winning the silver medal at the 1st AIBA African 2004 Olympic Qualifying Tournament in Casablanca, Morocco. In the final of the event he lost to Egyptian fighter Mohamed Abdelsayed.

His ban was to be lifted in 2006.

== See also ==
- List of sportspeople sanctioned for doping offences
