= Nestor Bolum =

Nigerian boxer (born 1986)

Medal record

Representing Nigeria

Men's Boxing

All-Africa Games
Silver medal – second place	2003 Abuja	Bantamweight

Commonwealth Games
Bronze medal – third place	2006 Melbourne	Bantamweight

Nestor Bolum (born 19 September 1986) is a Nigerian professional boxer. As an amateur, he represented his country in the 2004 Summer Olympics.

== Career ==
In 2003, southpaw Bolum, who works for the Nigerian Air Force, won the silver medal at the All-Africa Games in Abuja, Nigeria.

At the Olympics he was defeated in the quarterfinals of the bantamweight (54 kg) division by Thailand's eventual runner-up Worapoj Petchkoom.

At the Commonwealth Games he was edged out by eventual winner Akhil Kumar in the semifinal.

In November 2023, Bolum announced to the Guardian that he is returning to the boxing ring to face Luke Martin.

== Professional boxing record ==
14 fights	11 wins	3 losses
By knockout	2	1
By decision	9	2

No.	Result	Record	Opponent	Type	Round, time	Date	Location	Notes
14	Loss	11–3	(Australia) Liam Pope	SD	10	30 Jun 2023	Revesby Workers Club, Sydney, Australia	For vacant Australian featherweight title
13	Win	11–2	(New Zealand) Luke Martin	MD	6	12 Nov 2022	Revesby Workers Club, Sydney, Australia	
12	Loss	10–2	(New Zealand) Shiva Mishra	TKO	3 (8), 2:59	16 Nov 2019	Club Punchbowl, Sydney, Australia	For WBF Australasian lightweight title
11	Win	10–1	(Thailand) Apichet Saikane	UD	4	11 Nov 2016	Club Punchbowl, Sydney, Australia	
10	Win	9–1	(Thailand) Sunun Sangpet	KO	2 (4), 0:25	22 Jul 2016	Mediterranean House, Sydney, Australia	
9	Loss	8–1	(Canada) Tison Cave	UD	10	29 Jan 2011	Palooka’s Boxing Club, Halifax, Nova Scotia, Canada	For vacant WBC Continental Americas super-bantamweight title
8	Win	8–0	(South Africa) Klaas Mboyane	PTS	6	21 Nov 2007	Emperors Palace, Kempton Park, South Africa	
7	Win	7–0	(South Africa) Balanganani Ndou	TKO	3 (6)	17 Sep 2007	Emperors Palace, Kempton Park, South Africa	
6	Win	6–0	(South Africa) Balanganani Ndou	PTS	?	1 Jun 2007	Indoor Sports Centre, Thohoyandou, South Africa	
5	Win	5–0	(South Africa) Sipho Nkadimeng	PTS	4	31 Mar 2007	Sammy Marks Square, Pretoria, South Africa	
4	Win	4–0	(South Africa) Mandla Toli	PTS	4	24 Nov 2006	Convention Centre, Mahikeng, South Africa	
3	Win	3–0	(South Africa) Jeremiah Peeu	PTS	4	1 Oct 2006	Percy Wholesalers, Seshego, South Africa	
2	Win	2–0	(South Africa) Brian Mthimane	UD	4	18 Aug 2006	Uncle Tom's Hall, Soweto, South Africa	
1	Win	1–0	(South Africa) Gideon Buthelezi	UD	4	21 Jul 2006	Goldfields Arena, Carletonville, South Africa	
