= Malik Bouziane =

Algerian boxer (born 1978)

Personal information
- Born: January 11, 1978 (age 48)
Medal record
Men's Boxing
Representing Algeria
All-Africa Games
Gold medal – first place	2003 Abuja	Bantamweight
African Amateur Championships
Gold medal – first place	2003 Yaoundé	Bantamweight

Malik Bouziane (Arabic: مالك بوزيان) (born January 11, 1978) is an Algerian former professional boxer. As an amateur, he competed at the 2004 Summer Olympics.

== Career ==
At the 2004 Summer Olympics, Bouziane was stopped in the second round of the bantamweight (54 kg) division by Russia's Gennady Kovalev.

Bouziane had won the gold medal in the same division one year earlier, at the All-Africa Games in Abuja, Nigeria. He was a member of the team that competed for Africa at the 2005 Boxing World Cup in Moscow, Russia.

== Personal life ==
Bouziane is originally from the village of Taourirt Adene in the Tizi Ouzou Province in the Kabylie region of Algeria.

== Professional boxing record ==
15 Wins (2 knockouts, 13 decisions), 1 Loss (0 knockouts, 1 decision), 1 Draw
Res.	Record	Opponent	Type	Rd., Time	Date	Location	Notes
Win	15-1-1	(Brazil) Genilson de Jesus Santos	TKO	7 (10)	2013-03-30	Centre Omnisports, Massy, France	
Win	14-1-1	(Georgia (country)) Levan Garibashvili	PTS	8	2012-12-08	Salle Pierre de Coubertin, Massy, France	
Draw	13-1-1	(South Africa) Simphiwe Nongqayi	MD	12	2010-04-09	Centre Omnisports, Massy, France	For IBF super flyweight title
Win	13-1	(Italy) Emiliano Salvini	UD	12	2009-11-26	Gymnase J.Roure, Les Pennes-Mirabeau, France	Retained European bantamweight title
Win	12-1	(Belgium) Carmelo Ballone	UD	12	2009-06-19	Centre Omnisports, Massy, France	Retained European bantamweight title
Win	11-1	(United Kingdom) Ian Napa	UD	12	2009-03-20	(United Kingdom) Leisure Center, Newham, London, England	Won European bantamweight title
Win	10-1	(Romania) Cristian Niculae	PTS	6	2008-12-13	Salle Marcel Coene, Montataire, France	
Loss	9-1	(France) Mohamed Bouleghcha	PTS	10	2008-11-22	Salle Pierre Scohy, Aulnay-sous-Bois, France	Lost France bantamweight title
Win	9-0	(Spain) Jorge Perez	UD	12	2008-07-04	Salle Pierre de Coubertin, Massy, France	Won WBC Mediterranean bantamweight title
Win	8-0	(France) Alix Djavoiev	UD	6	2008-05-06	Parc des Sports et Loisirs, Pont-Audemer, France	
Win	7-0	(France) Jean-Marie Codet	UD	10	2008-02-15	Le Halle de Martigues, Martigues, France	Defended France bantamweight title
Win	6-0	(France) John Bikai	UD	10	2007-10-30	Centre Omnisports, Massy, France	Won France bantamweight title
Win	5-0	(Algeria) Cherif Saki	PTS	6	2007-05-11	Salle Vallier, Marseille, France	
Win	4-0	(Morocco) Nordine Barmou	PTS	8	2007-02-03	Centre Omnisports, Massy, France	
Win	3-0	(Romania) Cristian Mihai	PTS	6	2006-12-02	Le Bouscat, France	
Win	2-0	(Tunisia) Walid Abderrahmen	PTS	6	2006-06-17	Bondy, France	
Win	1-0	(France) Omar Oubaali	TKO	6 (6)	2006-05-12	Massy, France	
