= Ahmed Ismail El Shamy =

Egyptian boxer (born 1975)

Ahmed Ismail
Personal information
- Full name: Ahmed Ismail El Shamy
- Nationality: Egypt
- Born: October 21, 1975 (age 50) Cairo, Egypt
- Height: 1.81 m (5 ft 11 in)
- Weight: 81 kg (179 lb)

Sport
- Sport: Boxing
- Weight class: Light Heavyweight
Medal record
Olympic Games
Bronze medal – third place	2004 Athens	Light Heavyweight
All-Africa Games
Gold medal – first place	2003 Abuja	Light Heavyweight
Mediterranean Games
Gold medal – first place	2001 Tunis	Light Heavyweight

Ahmed Ismail El Shamy (Egyptian Arabic: احمد اسماعيل; born October 21, 1975) is an Egyptian boxer who competed in the Men's Light Heavyweight (– 81 kg) at the 2004 Summer Olympics and won the bronze medal. One year earlier, he won the gold medal in his weight division at the All-Africa Games as well as a bronze medal at the 1999 All-Africa Games.
