= 2001 Mediterranean Games =

14th edition of the Mediterranean Games

XIV Mediterranean Games
- Host city: Tunis, Tunisia
- Nations: 23
- Athletes: 2,991
- Events: 230 in 23 sports
- Opening: 2 September 2001
- Closing: 15 September 2001
- Opened by: Zine El Abidine Ben Ali
- Main venue: Stade 7 November

The XIV Mediterranean Games (Arabic: ألعاب البحر الأبيض المتوسط 2001), commonly known as the 2001 Mediterranean Games, were the 14th Mediterranean Games held in Tunis, Tunisia, from 2–15 September 2001, where 2,991 athletes (1,972 men and 1,019 women) from 23 countries participated. There were a total of 230 medal events from 23 different sports.

France won the most gold medals in the competition (40) while Italy had the greatest medal haul overall with 136 in total. Turkey, Spain and Greece rounded out the top five, shortly followed by the host country in sixth place. Two disability events were incorporated into the athletics programme – there was a 1500 m wheelchair race for men and an 800 m for women.

The Tunisian organisers of the Games decided not to hold the closing ceremony because of the September 11 attacks.

== Participating nations ==
The following is a list of nations that participated in the 2001 Mediterranean Games:

- Albania (42)
- Algeria (155)
- Andorra (9)
- Bosnia and Herzegovina (26)
- Croatia (134)
- Cyprus (66)
- Egypt (69)
- France (303)
- Greece (338)
- Italy (329)
- Jordan (20)
- Lebanon (59)
- Libya (33)
- Malta (16)
- Monaco (7)
- Morocco (117)
- San Marino (51)
- Slovenia (133)
- Spain (301)
- Syria (76)
- Tunisia (303)
- Turkey (261)
- FR Yugoslavia (143)

== Sports ==
- Athletics
- Basketball
- Boxing
- Bowls
- Cycling
- Fencing
- Football
- Golf
- Gymnastics
- Handball
- Judo
- Karate
- Rowing
- Sailing
- Shooting
- Swimming
- Tennis
- Table tennis
- Volleyball
- Water polo
- Weightlifting
- Wrestling

== Medal table ==
The rankings sort by the number of gold medals earned by a country. The number of silvers is taken into consideration next and then the number of bronze. Equal ranking is given and they are listed alphabetically if after the above, countries are still tied. This follows the system used by the IOC, IAAF and BBC.

| Place | Nation | 1st place, gold medalist(s) | 2nd place, silver medalist(s) | 3rd place, bronze medalist(s) | Total |
|---|---|---|---|---|---|
| 1 | France | 40 | 32 | 50 | 122 |
| 2 | Italy | 38 | 59 | 39 | 136 |
| 3 | Turkey | 33 | 16 | 12 | 61 |
| 4 | Spain | 31 | 26 | 41 | 98 |
| 5 | Greece | 28 | 33 | 26 | 87 |
| 6 | Tunisia | 19 | 12 | 25 | 56 |
| 7 | Algeria | 10 | 10 | 12 | 32 |
| 8 | Egypt | 7 | 13 | 17 | 37 |
| 9 | Croatia | 6 | 6 | 6 | 18 |
| 10 | Morocco | 6 | 4 | 5 | 15 |
| 11 | Slovenia | 5 | 5 | 10 | 20 |
| 12 | Yugoslavia | 3 | 5 | 14 | 22 |
| 13 | Cyprus | 1 | 1 | 3 | 5 |
| 14 | Syria | 0 | 5 | 4 | 9 |
| 15 | Lebanon | 0 | 1 | 1 | 2 |
| 16 | Albania | 0 | 1 | 0 | 1 |
| 17 | Bosnia and Herzegovina | 0 | 0 | 3 | 3 |
| 18 | Libya | 0 | 0 | 1 | 1 |
| Total | | 227 | 229 | 269 | 725 |
