= Thailand at the 2000 Summer Olympics =

- IOC code: THA
- NOC: National Olympic Committee of Thailand
- Website: www.olympicthai.or.th (in Thai and English)

in Sydney
- Competitors: 52 (34 men and 18 women) in 11 sports
- Flag bearer: Somluck Kamsing
- Medals Ranked 47th: Gold 1 Silver 0 Bronze 2 Total 3

Summer Olympics appearances (overview)
- 1952; 1956; 1960; 1964; 1968; 1972; 1976; 1980; 1984; 1988; 1992; 1996; 2000; 2004; 2008; 2012; 2016; 2020; 2024; 2028

Thailand competed at the 2000 Summer Olympics in Sydney, Australia.

== Medalists ==
Medal	Name	Sport	Event	Date
Gold	Wijan Ponlid	Boxing	Flyweight	1 October
Bronze	Pornchai Thongburan	Boxing	Middleweight	29 September
Bronze	Khassaraporn Suta	Weightlifting	Women's -58 kg	18 September

== Athletics ==
Key

- Q = Qualified for the next round by position in race or, in field events, by achieving the automatic qualification target
- q = Qualified for the next round as a fastest loser or, in field events, by position without achieving the qualifying target

Track and road events

Athlete	Event	Heat		Quarterfinal		Semifinal		Final	
Athlete	Event	Time	Rank	Time	Rank	Time	Rank	Time	Rank
Kongdech Natenee; Vissanu Sophanich; Boonyarit Phuksachat; Sittichai Suwonprateep	Men's 4 × 100 m relay	39.13	13 Q	—N/a		39.05	13	Did not advance	
Jirachai Linglom; Senee Kongtong; Chalermpol Noohlong; Narong Nilploy	Men's 4 × 400 m relay	3:11.65	29	—N/a		Did not advance			
Trecia Roberts	Women's 100 m hurdles	13.16	24 Q	12.96	11 q	13.15	14	Did not advance	
Wirawan Ruamsuk; Supavadee Khawpeag; Neeranuch Klomdee; Trecia Roberts	Women's 4 × 100 m relay	44.51	19	—N/a		Did not advance			

== Badminton ==
Athlete	Event	Round of 64	Round of 32	Round of 16	Quarterfinals	Semifinals	Final / BM	
Athlete	Event	Opposition Result	Opposition Result	Opposition Result	Opposition Result	Opposition Result	Opposition Result	Rank
Boonsak Ponsana	Men's singles	Vaughan (GBR); L 8–15, 12–15	Did not advance					
Pramote Teerawiwatana; Tesana Panvisvas	Men's doubles	—N/a	Lens / van Dalm (NED); W 15–11, 15–7	Choong / Lee (MAS); L 15–11, 15–17, 9–15	Did not advance			
Sujitra Ekmongkolpaisarn	Women's singles	Sørensen (DEN); L 7–11, 10–13	Did not advance					
Saralee Thungthongkam; Sujitra Ekmongkolpaisarn	Women's doubles	—N/a	Head / Lucas (AUS); W 15–7, 15–4	Huang / Yang (CHN); L 1–15, 4–15	Did not advance			
Saralee Thungthongkam; Khunakorn Sudhisodhi	Mixed doubles	—N/a	Cator / Blackburn (AUS); W 11–15, 15–7, 17–16	Ra / Kim (KOR); L 7–15, 2–15	Did not advance			

== Boxing ==
Athlete	Event	Round of 32	Round of 16	Quarterfinal	Semifinal	Final	
Athlete	Event	Opposition Result	Opposition Result	Opposition Result	Opposition Result	Opposition Result	Rank
Suban Pannon	Light flyweight	Yuldashev (UZB); W 16–6	Va. Sydorenko (UKR); L RSC R1	Did not advance			
Wijan Ponlid	Flyweight	Zakaryan (GER); W RSC R4	Kooner (CAN); W 11–7	Mantilla (CUB); W 19–8	Vo. Sydorenko (UKR); W 14–11	Zhumadilov (KAZ); W 19–12	1st place, gold medalist(s)
Sontaya Wongprates	Bantamweight	Bye	Kane (AUS); L 13–15	Did not advance			
Somluck Kamsing	Featherweight	Ledesma (COL); W RSC R4	Turgunov (UZB); W 7–2	Juarez (USA); L RSC R4	Did not advance		
Pongsith Wiangwiset	Lightweight	Bye	Kindelán (CUB); L 8–14	Did not advance			
Pongsak Rientuanthong	Light welterweight	Paris (ITA); L 3–14	Did not advance				
Parkpoom Jangphonak	Welterweight	Ajetović (YUG); W 9–9	Dotsenko (UKR); L 5–13	Did not advance			
Pornchai Thongburan	Light middleweight	Bye	Balzsay (HUN); W 17–12	Hikal (EGY); W 15–9	Simion (ROU); L 16–26	Did not advance	3rd place, bronze medalist(s)
Somchai Chimlum	Middleweight	Gutiérrez (CUB); L 11–20	Did not advance				

== Diving ==
Athlete	Event	Preliminary		Semifinal				Final		Total	
Athlete	Event	Points	Rank	Points	Rank	Total	Rank	Points	Rank	Points	Rank
Meerit Insawang	Men's 3 m springboard	306.24	43	Did not advance							
Suchart Pichi	Men's 10 m platform	268.65	39	Did not advance							

== Rowing ==
Athlete	Event	Heat		Repechage		Semifinal		Final	
Athlete	Event	Time	Rank	Time	Rank	Time	Rank	Time	Rank
Phuttharaksa Neegree	Women's single sculls	8:22.54	4 R	8:27.25	3 SF C/D	8:29.60	4	Did not advance	

== Sailing ==
Athlete	Event	Race											Points	Rank
Athlete	Event	1	2	3	4	5	6	7	8	9	10	11	Points	Rank
Arun Homraruen	Men's Mistral	27	26	13	25	29	26	19	16	23	~~30~~	~~32~~	204	29
Napalai Tansai	Women's Mistral	16	23	~~25~~	21	16	15	14	17	~~25~~	17	9	148	19
Veerasit Puangnak	Laser	37	36	28	20	23	38	3	~~40~~	20	~~39~~	33	238	31

== Shooting ==
Athlete	Event	Qualification		Final		Total	
Athlete	Event	Points	Rank	Points	Rank	Points	Rank
Tevarit Majchacheep	Men's 50 m rifle three positions	1144	37	Did not advance			
Tevarit Majchacheep	Men's 50 m rifle prone	580	51	Did not advance			
Tevarit Majchacheep	Men's 10 m air rifle	588	18	Did not advance			
Varavut Majchacheep	Men's 50 m rifle three positions	1126	43	Did not advance			
Varavut Majchacheep	Men's 50 m rifle prone	583	47	Did not advance			
Varavut Majchacheep	Men's 10 m air rifle	575	45	Did not advance			

== Swimming ==
Men

Athlete	Event	Heat		Semifinal		Final	
Athlete	Event	Time	Rank	Time	Rank	Time	Rank
Dulyarit Phuangthong	100 m backstroke	58.48	43	Did not advance			
Dulyarit Phuangthong	200 m butterfly	2:04.15	38	Did not advance			
Vicha Ratanachote	200 m freestyle	1:54.91	43	Did not advance			
Torwai Sethsothorn	400 m freestyle	3:56.68	24	—N/a		Did not advance	
Torwai Sethsothorn	1500 m freestyle	15:39.60	28	—N/a		Did not advance	
Torwai Sethsothorn	200 m backstroke	2:05.52	35	Did not advance			
Torwai Sethsothorn	400 m individual medley	4:28.42	32	—N/a		Did not advance	
Ratapong Sirisanont	200 m breaststroke	2:23.95	41	Did not advance			
Pathunyu Yimsomruay	200 m individual medley	2:08.38	43	Did not advance			

Women

Athlete	Event	Heat		Semifinal		Final	
Athlete	Event	Time	Rank	Time	Rank	Time	Rank
Praphalsai Minpraphal	100 m butterfly	1:02.99	37	Did not advance			
Pilin Tachakittiranan	50 m freestyle	27.31	45	Did not advance			
Pilin Tachakittiranan	100 m freestyle	58.69	39	Did not advance			
Pilin Tachakittiranan	200 m freestyle	2:05.88	30	Did not advance			
Pilin Tachakittiranan	400 m freestyle	4:29.28	39	—N/a		Did not advance	
Chonlathorn Vorathamrong	100 m backstroke	1:05.98	35	Did not advance			
Chonlathorn Vorathamrong	200 m backstroke	2:21.59	30	Did not advance			

== Table tennis ==
Athlete	Event	Group stage			Round of 32	Round of 16	Quarterfinals	Semifinals	Final / BM	
Athlete	Event	Opposition Result	Opposition Result	Rank	Opposition Result	Opposition Result	Opposition Result	Opposition Result	Opposition Result	Rank
Nanthana Komwong	Women's singles	Zhou (AUS); L 1–3	Geng (CAN); L 0–3	3	Did not advance					

== Tennis ==
Athlete	Event	Round of 64	Round of 32	Round of 16	Quarterfinals	Semifinals	Final / BM	
Athlete	Event	Opposition Result	Opposition Result	Opposition Result	Opposition Result	Opposition Result	Opposition Result	Rank
Paradorn Srichaphan	Men's singles	Sávolt (HUN); W 6–2, 4–6, 7–5	Norman (SWE); L 5–7, 2–6	Did not advance				
Tamarine Tanasugarn	Women's singles	Pisnik (SLO); W 6–4, 6–3	Williams (USA); L 2–6, 3–6	Did not advance				
Benjamas Sangaram; Tamarine Tanasugarn	Women's doubles	—N/a	Mesa / Zuluaga (COL); W 7–6^{4}, 5–7, 6–4	Miyagi / Sugiyama (JPN); W 2–6, 7–5, 6–2	Boogert / Oremans (NED); L 4–6, 6–3, 5–7	Did not advance		

== Weightlifting ==
Athlete	Event	Snatch		Clean & Jerk		Total	
Athlete	Event	Weight	Rank	Weight	Rank	Weight	Rank
Chom Singnoi	Men's –62 kg	DNF					
Khassaraporn Suta	Women's –58 kg	92.5	3	117.5	3	210.0	3rd place, bronze medalist(s)
Saipin Detsaeng	Women's –63 kg	102.5	3	120.0	4	222.5	4
Aphinya Pharksupho	Women's –69 kg	102.5	4	120.0	11	222.5	10
Pawina Thongsuk	Women's –69 kg	100.0	5	125.0	8	225.0	7
