= Boxing at the 2000 Summer Olympics – Flyweight =

Boxing competitions

Men's flyweight boxing at the Games of the XXVII Olympiad
- Venue: Sydney Convention and Exhibition Centre
- Date: 19 September to 1 October 2000
- Competitors: 28 from 28 nations

Medalists
1st place, gold medalist(s)		Wijan Ponlid	Thailand
2nd place, silver medalist(s)		Bulat Zhumadilov	Kazakhstan
3rd place, bronze medalist(s)		Jérôme Thomas	France
3rd place, bronze medalist(s)		Vladimir Sidorenko	Ukraine

The men's flyweight boxing competition at the 2000 Olympic Games in Sydney was held from 19 September to 1 October at the Sydney Convention and Exhibition Centre.

== Competition format ==
Like all Olympic boxing events, the competition was a straight single-elimination tournament. This event consisted of 28 boxers who have qualified for the competition through various qualifying tournaments held in 1999 and 2000. The competition began with a preliminary round on 19 September, where the number of competitors was reduced to 16, and concluded with the final on 1 October. As there were fewer than 32 boxers in the competition, a number of boxers received a bye through the preliminary round. Both semi-final losers were awarded bronze medals.

All bouts consisted of four rounds of two minutes each, with one-minute breaks between rounds. Punches scored only if the white area on the front of the glove made full contact with the front of the head or torso of the opponent. Five judges scored each bout; three of the judges had to signal a scoring punch within one second for the punch to score. The winner of the bout was the boxer who scored the most valid punches by the end of the bout.

== Competitors ==
Name	Country
Vic Darchinyan	Armenia
Ilfat Raziapov	Russia
Bulat Zhumadilov	Kazakhstan
Kennedy Kanyanta	Zambia
Jérôme Thomas	France
Erle Wiltshire	Australia
Mohammad Rahim Rahimi	Iran
Drissa Tou	Burkina Faso
José Navarro	United States
Hermensen Ballo	Indonesia
Halil Ibrahim Turan	Turkey
Hicham Mesbahi	Morocco
Bogdan Dobrescu	Romania
Yang Xiangzhong	China
Manuel Mantilla	Cuba
Kim Tae-Kyu	South Korea
Andrew Kooner	Canada
Nacer Keddam	Algeria
Wijan Ponlid	Thailand
Vardan Zakaryan	Germany
Celestin Augustin	Madagascar
Andrzej Rzany	Poland
Jackson Asiku	Uganda
Arian Lerio	Philippines
Omar Andrés Narváez	Argentina
Carlos Valcárcel	Puerto Rico
Daniel Ponce de León	Mexico
Volodymyr Sydorenko	Ukraine

== Results ==
All times are Australian Time (UTC+10)

Round of 32; Tuesday, September 19, 2000; 13:00 & 19:30
Jérôme Thomas (FRA)	13
Erle Wiltshire (AUS)	1
Mohammad Rahim Rahimi (IRI)
Drissa Tou (BUR)	WO
José Navarro (USA)	16
Hermensen Ballo (INA)	10
Halil İbrahim Turan (TUR)	11
Hicham Mesbahi (MAR)	17
Bogdan Dobrescu (ROM)	12
Yang Xiangzhong (CHN)	3
Manuel Mantilla (CUB)	20
Kim Tae-gyu (KOR)	8
Andrew Kooner (CAN)	18
Nacer Keddam (ALG)	11
Wijan Ponlid (THA)	RSC
Vardan Zakaryan (GER)
Celestin Augustin (MAD)
Andrzej Rzany (POL)	RSC
Jackson Asiku (UGA)
Arlan Lerio (PHI)	RSC
Omar Andrés Narváez (ARG)	12
Carlos Valcárcel (PUR)	6
Daniel Ponce de León (MEX)	8
Vladimir Sidorenko (UKR)	16

Round of 16; Sunday, September 24, 2000; 13:00 & 19:30
Vic Darchinyan (ARM)	20
Ilfat Razyapov (RUS)	11
Bulat Zhumadilov (KAZ)	12
Kennedy Kanyanta (ZAM)	9
Jérôme Thomas (FRA)	RSC
Drissa Tou (BUR)
José Navarro (USA)	12
Hicham Mesbahi (MAR)	9
Bogdan Dobrescu (ROM)
Manuel Mantilla (CUB)	RSC
Andrew Kooner (CAN)	7
Wijan Ponlid (THA)	11
Andrzej Rzany (POL)	18^{+}
Arlan Lerio (PHI)	18
Omar Andrés Narváez (ARG)	10
Vladimir Sidorenko (UKR)	16

Quarter-finals; Wednesday, September 27, 2000; 13:00 & 19:30
Vic Darchinyan (ARM)	8
Bulat Zhumadilov (KAZ)	15
Jérôme Thomas (FRA)	23
José Navarro (USA)	12
Manuel Mantilla (CUB)	8
Wijan Ponlid (THA)	19
Andrzej Rzany (POL)
Vladimir Sidorenko (UKR)	RSC

Semi-finals; Friday, September 29, 2000; 19:30
Bulat Zhumadilov (KAZ)	22
Jérôme Thomas (FRA)	16
Wijan Ponlid (THA)	14
Vladimir Sidorenko (UKR)	11

Final; Sunday, October 1, 2000; 13:00
Bulat Zhumadilov (KAZ)	12
Wijan Ponlid (THA)	19
