= Boxing at the 2000 Summer Olympics – Light middleweight =

Boxing competitions

Men's light middleweight boxing at the Games of the XXVII Olympiad
- Venue: Sydney Convention and Exhibition Centre
- Date: 19 September to 1 October 2000
- Competitors: 28 from 28 nations

Medalists
1st place, gold medalist(s)		Yermakhan Ibraimov	Kazakhstan
2nd place, silver medalist(s)		Marian Simion	Romania
3rd place, bronze medalist(s)		Pornchai Thongburan	Thailand
3rd place, bronze medalist(s)		Jermain Taylor	United States

The men's light middleweight boxing competition at the 2000 Olympic Games in Sydney was held from 19 September to 1 October at the Sydney Convention and Exhibition Centre. This was also the last Olympic games for the light middleweight category in Olympic boxing.

== Competition format ==
Like all Olympic boxing events, the competition was a straight single-elimination tournament. This event consisted of 28 boxers who have qualified for the competition through various qualifying tournaments held in 1999 and 2000. The competition began with a preliminary round on 19 September, where the number of competitors was reduced to 16, and concluded with the final on 1 October. As there were fewer than 32 boxers in the competition, a number of boxers received a bye through the preliminary round. Both semi-final losers were awarded bronze medals.

All bouts consisted of four rounds of two minutes each, with one-minute breaks between rounds. Punches scored only if the white area on the front of the glove made full contact with the front of the head or torso of the opponent. Five judges scored each bout; three of the judges had to signal a scoring punch within one second for the punch to score. The winner of the bout was the boxer who scored the most valid punches by the end of the bout.

== Competitors ==
Name	Country
Mohamed Hikal	Egypt
Song In-Joon	South Korea
Pornchai Thongburan	Thailand
Károly Balzsay	Hungary
Andrey Mishin	Russia
Frédéric Esther	France
Michael Roche	Ireland
Firat Karagollu	Turkey
José Luis Zertuche	Mexico
Sidy Sandy	Guinea
Ciro Di Corcia	Italy
Marian Simion	Romania
Stephan Nzue Mba	Gabon
Juan Hernández Sierra	Cuba
Osumanu Adama	Ghana
Mohamed Marmouri	Tunisia
Yousif Massas	Syria
Yermakhan Ibraimov	Kazakhstan
Hely Yánes	Venezuela
Nurbek Kasenov	Kyrgyzstan
Dmitry Usagin	Bulgaria
Jermain Taylor	United States
Scott MacIntosh	Canada
Sakio Bika	Cameroon
Juan José Ubaldo	Dominican Republic
Richard Rowles	Australia
Adnan Ćatić	Germany
Dilshod Yarbekov	Uzbekistan

== Results ==
All times are Australian Time (UTC+10)

Round of 32; Tuesday, September 19, 2000; 13:00 & 19:30
Andrey Mishin (RUS)	11
Frédéric Esther (FRA)	16
Michael Roche (IRL)	4
Fırat Karagöllü (TUR)	17
José Luis Zertuche (MEX)	RSC
Sidy Sandy (GUI)
Ciro Di Corcia (ITA)	8
Marian Simion (ROM)	19
Stephan Nzue Mba (GAB)
Juan Hernández Sierra (CUB)	RSC
Osumanu Adama (GHA)
Mohamed Marmouri (TUN)	RSC
Yousif Massas (SYR)
Yermakhan Ibraimov (KAZ)	RSC
Hely Yánes (VEN)	20
Nurbek Kasenov (KGZ)	12
Dmitry Usagin (BUL)
Jermain Taylor (USA)	RSC
Scott MacIntosh (CAN)	8
Sakio Bika (CMR)	5
Juan José Ubaldo (DOM)	7
Richard Rowles (AUS)	16
Adnan Ćatić (GER)	10
Dilshod Yarbekov (UZB)	6

Round of 16; Sunday, September 24, 2000; 13:00 & 19:30
Mohamed Hikal (EGY)	16
Song In-jun (KOR)	5
Pornchai Thongburan (THA)	17
Károly Balzsay (HUN)	12
Frédéric Esther (FRA)	18
Firat Karagollu (TUR)	16
José Luis Zertuche (MEX)
Marian Simion (ROM)	RSC
Juan Hernández Sierra (CUB)	RSC
Mohamed Marmouri (TUN)
Yermakhan Ibraimov (KAZ)	RSC
Hely Yánes (VEN)
Jermain Taylor (USA)	23
Scott MacIntosh (CAN)	9
Richard Rowles (AUS)
Adnan Ćatić (GER)	RSC

Quarter-finals; Wednesday, September 27, 2000; 13:00 & 19:30
Mohamed Hikal (EGY)	9
Pornchai Thongburan (THA)	15
Frédéric Esther (FRA)
Marian Simion (ROM)	RSC
Juan Hernández Sierra (CUB)	9
Yermakhan Ibraimov (KAZ)	16
Jermain Taylor (USA)	19
Adnan Ćatić (GER)	14

Semi-finals; Friday, September 29, 2000; 19:30
Pornchai Thongburan (THA)	16
Marian Simion (ROM)	26
Yermakhan Ibraimov (KAZ)	RSC
Jermain Taylor (USA)

Final; Sunday, October 1, 2000; 13:00
Marian Simion (ROM)	23
Yermakhan Ibraimov (KAZ)	25
