= Morocco at the 2000 Summer Olympics =

- IOC code: MAR
- NOC: Moroccan Olympic Committee
- Website: www.cnom.org.ma (in French)

in Sydney
- Competitors: 55 in 9 sports
- Flag bearer: Adil Belgaïd
- Medals Ranked 58th: Gold 0 Silver 1 Bronze 4 Total 5

Summer Olympics appearances (overview)
- 1960; 1964; 1968; 1972; 1976; 1980; 1984; 1988; 1992; 1996; 2000; 2004; 2008; 2012; 2016; 2020; 2024

Morocco competed at the 2000 Summer Olympics in Sydney, Australia.

== Medalists ==
Medal	Name	Sport	Event	Date
Silver	Hicham El Guerrouj	Athletics	Men's 1500 metres	29 September
Bronze	Nezha Bidouane	Athletics	Women's 400 metres hurdles	27 September
Bronze	Ali Ezzine	Athletics	Men's 3000 metres steeplechase	29 September
Bronze	Tahar Tamsamani	Boxing	Featherweight	29 September
Bronze	Brahim Lahlafi	Athletics	Men's 5000 metres	30 September

== Competitors ==
The following is the list of number of competitors in the Games.

Sport	Men	Women	Total
Athletics	17	7	24
Boxing	5	–	5
Canoeing	1	0	1
Football	17	0	17
Judo	2	0	2
Sailing	1	0	1
Swimming	1	0	1
Taekwondo	1	2	3
Tennis	1	0	1
Total	46	9	55

== Athletics ==
Key

- Note–Ranks given for track events are within the athlete's heat only
- Q = Qualified for the next round
- q = Qualified for the next round as a fastest loser or, in field events, by position without achieving the qualifying target
- NR = National record
- N/A = Round not applicable for the event
- Bye = Athlete not required to compete in round

Men
Track and road events

Athletes	Events	Heat Round 1		Heat Round 2		Semifinal		Final	
Athletes	Events	Time	Rank	Time	Rank	Time	Rank	Time	Rank
Mouhssin Chehibi	800 metres	1:48.51	24 Q	—N/a		1:49.88	23	Did not advance	
El-Mahjoub Haïda	800 metres	1:47.14	15 q	—N/a		1:46.35	14	Did not advance	
Khalid Tighazouine	800 metres	1:46.33	10 Q	—N/a		1:45.38	10	Did not advance	
Youssef Baba	1500 metres	3:38.68	6 Q	—N/a		3:40.16	11 Q	3:56.08	12
Hicham El Guerrouj	1500 metres	3:38.57	4 Q	—N/a		3:37.60	1 Q	3:32.32	2nd place, silver medalist(s)
Adil Kaouch	1500 metres	3:41.06	28	—N/a		Did not advance			
Mohamed Saïd El Wardi	5000 metres	13:35.18	19	—N/a				Did not advance	
Brahim Lahlafi	5000 metres	13:22.70	1 Q	—N/a				13:36.47	3rd place, bronze medalist(s)
Saïd Bérioui	10,000 metres	27:45.83	5 Q	—N/a				27:37.83	6
Boubker El-Afoui	Marathon	—N/a						2:23:38	52
Abdelkader El Mouaziz	Marathon	—N/a						2:13:49	7
Mustapha Sdad	400 metres hurdles	51.39	48	—N/a		Did not advance			
Brahim Boulami	3000 metres steeplechase	8:24.43	11 Q	—N/a				8:24.32	7
Ali Ezzine	3000 metres steeplechase	8:23.79	7 Q	—N/a				8:22.15	3rd place, bronze medalist(s)
El-Arbi Khattabi	3000 metres steeplechase	8:43.46	31	—N/a				Did not advance	

Field events

Athlete	Event	Qualification		Final	
Athlete	Event	Distance	Position	Distance	Position
El-Mehdi El-Ghazouani	Long jump	7.60	31	Did not advance	
Younès Moudrik	Long jump	7.95	17	Did not advance	

Women
Track and road events

Athletes	Events	Heat Round 1		Heat Round 2		Semifinal		Final	
Athletes	Events	Time	Rank	Time	Rank	Time	Rank	Time	Rank
Mina Aït Hammou	800 metres	2:03.25	23	—N/a		Did not advance			
Hasna Benhassi	800 metres	2:00.50	11 q	—N/a		1:59.19	7 Q	1:59.27	8
Hasna Benhassi	1500 metres	Did not start		—N/a		Did not advance			
Seloua Ouaziz	1500 metres	4:10.82	19 Q	—N/a		4:09.11	14	Did not advance	
Zhor El Kamch	5000 metres	16:02.50	24	—N/a				Did not advance	
Bouchra Chaabi	10,000 metres	34:49.35	38	—N/a				Did not advance	
Asmae Leghzaoui	10,000 metres	32:56.63	19 q	—N/a				31:59.21	18
Nezha Bidouane	400 metres hurdles	55.38	1 Q	—N/a		54.19	3 Q	53.57	3rd place, bronze medalist(s)

== Boxing ==
Men

Athlete	Event	Round of 32	Round of 16	Quarterfinals	Semifinals	Final	
Athlete	Event	Opposition Result	Opposition Result	Opposition Result	Opposition Result	Opposition Result	Rank
Hicham Mesbahi	Flyweight	Turan (TUR); W 17–11	Navarro (USA); L 9–12	Did not advance			
Hassan Oucheikh	Bantamweight	Tsujimoto (JPN); L 12–12	Did not advance				
Tahar Tamsamani	Featherweight	Bye	Park (KOR); W 21–14	Perez (ARG); W 21–18	Sattarkhanov (KAZ); L 10–12	Did not advance	3rd place, bronze medalist(s)
Mohamed Mesbahi	Middleweight	Bye	Zubrihin (UKR); L 5–9	Did not advance			
Azize Raguig	Light heavyweight	Fedchuk (UKR); L RSC–R3	Did not advance				

== Canoeing ==
=== Slalom ===
Athlete	Event	Preliminary						Final					
Athlete	Event	Run 1	Rank	Run 2	Rank	Total	Rank	Run 1	Rank	Run 2	Rank	Total	Rank
Nizar Samlal	Men's K-1	154.02	22	145.20	20	299.22	20	Did not advance					

== Football ==
=== Men's tournament ===
Team roster

Head coach: Said El-Khider

No.	Pos.	Player	Date of birth (age)	Caps	Club
1	GK	Tarik El Jarmouni	30 December 1977 (aged 22)		(Morocco) SCCM de Mohammédia
2	MF	Hamid Nater	30 December 1980 (aged 19)		(Morocco) Raja Casablanca
3	DF	Akram Roumani	1 April 1978 (aged 22)		(Belgium) Genk
4	DF	El Houssaine Ouchla*	1 December 1970 (aged 29)		(Morocco) FAR Rabat
5	MF	Adel Chbouki*	3 May 1971 (aged 29)		(Morocco) Wydad Casablanca
6	DF	Fouzi El Brazi	22 May 1977 (aged 23)		(Netherlands) Twente
7	DF	Mohamed Kharbouch	22 January 1977 (aged 23)		(Morocco) Raja Casablanca
8	MF	Abdelmajid Oulmers	12 September 1978 (aged 22)		(France) ES Wasquehal
9	FW	Jaouad Zairi	17 April 1982 (aged 18)		(France) Gueugnon
10	MF	Otmane El Assas	30 January 1979 (aged 21)		(Morocco) OC Khouribga
11	FW	Bouchaib El Moubarki	12 January 1978 (aged 22)		(Morocco) Raja Casablanca
12	FW	Abdelfattah El Khattari	3 March 1977 (aged 23)		(Morocco) SCCM de Mohammédia
13	DF	Noureddine Kacemi	17 October 1977 (aged 22)		(Morocco) SCCM de Mohammédia
14	FW	Salaheddine Bassir*	5 September 1972 (aged 28)		(Spain) Deportivo La Coruña
15	MF	Youssef Safri	13 January 1977 (aged 23)		(Morocco) Raja Casablanca
16	FW	Karim Benkouar	25 November 1979 (aged 20)		(France) Nîmes
17	MF	Zakaria Aboub	3 June 1980 (aged 20)		(Morocco) Raja Casablanca
18	GK	Abdelilah Bagui	1 January 1978 (aged 22)		(Morocco) MAS Fes
20	MF	Aissam Barroudi	10 May 1978 (aged 22)		(Morocco) MAS Fes

- Stand-by players

No.	Pos.	Player	Date of birth (age)	Caps	Club
19	MF	Abdeslam Ouaddou	1 November 1978 (aged 21)		(France) Nancy
21	FW	Bouchaib El Battachi	14 September 1978 (aged 21)		(Morocco) Khouribga
22	GK	Hicham Laaraj	20 November 1978 (aged 21)		(Morocco) TAS Casablanca

Group play

Team	Pld	W	D	L	GF	GA	GD	Pts
Chile	3	2	0	1	7	3	+4	6
Spain	3	2	0	1	6	3	+3	6
South Korea	3	2	0	1	2	3	−1	6
Morocco	3	0	0	3	1	7	−6	0

14 September 2000
20:00

Morocco	1–4	Chile
Ouchla 79'	Report	Zamorano 36', 45+1' (pen.), 55'; Navia 72' (pen.)

Melbourne Cricket Ground, Melbourne
Attendance: 22,654
Referee: Saad Mane (Kuwait)

17 September 2000
18:30

South Korea	1–0	Morocco
Lee Chun-soo 53'	Report

Hindmarsh Stadium, Adelaide
Attendance: 12,753
Referee: Herbert Fandel (Germany)

20 September 2000
20:00

Spain	2–0	Morocco
José Mari 33'; Gabri 90'	Report

Melbourne Cricket Ground, Melbourne
Attendance: 24,623
Referee: Lu Jun (China)

== Judo ==
Men

Athlete	Event	Round of 32	Round of 16	Quarterfinals	Semifinals	Repechage 1	Repechage 2	Repechage 3	Final / BM	
Athlete	Event	Opposition Result	Opposition Result	Opposition Result	Opposition Result	Opposition Result	Opposition Result	Opposition Result	Opposition Result	Rank
Abdelouahed Idrissi Chorfi	−60 kg	Despezelle (FRA); L	Did not advance							
Adil Belgaïd	−81 kg	Ochirbat (MGL); L	Did not advance							

== Sailing ==
Men

Athlete	Event	Race											Points	Rank
Athlete	Event	1	2	3	4	5	6	7	8	9	10	11	Points	Rank
Rachid Roussafi	Mistral	32	34	33	~~35~~	~~36~~	35	35	34	32	33	35	303	36

== Swimming ==
Athlete	Event	Heat		Semifinal		Final	
Athlete	Event	Time	Rank	Time	Rank	Time	Rank
Saad Khalloqi	200 m individual medley	2:13.22	54	Did not advance			

== Taekwondo ==
Men

Athlete	Event	Round of 16	Quarterfinals	Semifinals	Repechage Quarterfinals	Repechage Semifinals	Final / BM	
Athlete	Event	Opposition Result	Opposition Result	Opposition Result	Opposition Result	Opposition Result	Opposition Result	Rank
Younès Sekkat	−80 kg	Lyons (AUS); W 4–4	Esparza (ESP); L 1–3	Did not advance	Bye	Taraburelli (ARG); L 4–5	Did not advance	

Women

Athlete	Event	Round of 16	Quarterfinals	Semifinals	Repechage Quarterfinals	Repechage Semifinals	Final / BM	
Athlete	Event	Opposition Result	Opposition Result	Opposition Result	Opposition Result	Opposition Result	Opposition Result	Rank
Meriem Bidani	−67 kg	Okamoto (JPN); L 1–4	Did not advance					
Mounia Bourguigue	+67 kg	Bye	Chen (CHN); L 3–5	Did not advance	White (AUS); W 3–1	Vezmar (CRO); L 1–4	Did not advance	

== Tennis ==
Men

Athlete	Event	Round of 64	Round of 32	Round of 16	Quarterfinals	Semifinals	Final / BM	
Athlete	Event	Opposition Score	Opposition Score	Opposition Score	Opposition Score	Opposition Score	Opposition Score	Rank
Karim Alami	Singles	Squillari (ARG); W 6–4, 7–6^{(7–5)}	Pozzi (ITA); W 6–2, 4–6, 8–6	Santoro (FRA); W 6–2, 5–7, 6–4	Federer (SUI); L 6–7^{(2–7)}, 1–6	Did not advance		=5
