= Boxing at the 2000 Summer Olympics – Featherweight =

Boxing competitions

Men's featherweight boxing at the Games of the XXVII Olympiad
- Venue: Sydney Convention and Exhibition Centre
- Date: 18 September to 1 October 2000
- Competitors: 28 from 28 nations

Medalists
1st place, gold medalist(s)		Bekzat Sattarkhanov	Kazakhstan
2nd place, silver medalist(s)		Ricardo Juarez	United States
3rd place, bronze medalist(s)		Tahar Tamsamani	Morocco
3rd place, bronze medalist(s)		Kamil Djamaloudinov	Russia

The men's featherweight boxing competition at the 2000 Olympic Games in Sydney was held from 18 September to 1 October at the Sydney Convention and Exhibition Centre. Bekzat Sattarkhanov of Kazakhstan claimed the featherweight title. Three months later, he was killed in a car accident.

== Competition format ==
Like all Olympic boxing events, the competition was a straight single-elimination tournament. This event consisted of 28 boxers who have qualified for the competition through various qualifying tournaments held in 1999 and 2000. The competition began with a preliminary round on 18 September, where the number of competitors was reduced to 16, and concluded with the final on 1 October. As there were fewer than 32 boxers in the competition, a number of boxers received a bye through the preliminary round. Both semi-final losers were awarded bronze medals.

All bouts consisted of four rounds of two minutes each, with one-minute breaks between rounds. Punches scored only if the white area on the front of the glove made full contact with the front of the head or torso of the opponent. Five judges scored each bout; three of the judges had to signal a scoring punch within one second for the punch to score. The winner of the bout was the boxer who scored the most valid punches by the end of the bout.

== Competitors ==
Name	Country
Musa Simelane	Swaziland
Israel Hector Pérez	Argentina
Tahar Tamsamani	Morocco
Park Heung-Min	South Korea
Ovidiu Bobîrnat	Romania
Bekzat Sattarkhanov	Kazakhstan
Noureddine Medjihoud	Algeria
Jeffrey Mathebula	South Africa
Valdemir Pereira	Brazil
James Swan	Australia
Haider Ali	Pakistan
Ramazan Palyani	Turkey
Falk Huste	Germany
Joni Turunen	Finland
Bijan Batmani	Iran
Ricardo Juarez	United States
Kassim Napa Adam	Uganda
Tulkunbay Turgunov	Uzbekistan
Somluck Kamsing	Thailand
Andrés Ledesma	Colombia
Servin Suleymanov	Ukraine
Yuri Mladenov	Bulgaria
Hidehiko Tsukamoto	Japan
Yosvani Aguilera	Cuba
Kamil Djamaloudinov	Russia
Vida Bičiulaitis	Lithuania
Yohannes Sheferaw	Ethiopia
Francisco Bojado	Mexico

== Results ==
All times are Australian Time (UTC+10)

Round of 32; Monday, September 18, 2000; 13:00 & 19:30
Ovidiu Bobîrnat (ROM)	5
Bekzat Sattarkhanov (KAZ)	14
Noureddine Medjihoud (ALG)	5
Jeffrey Mathebula (RSA)	10
Valdemir Pereira (BRA)	8
James Swan (AUS)	4
Haider Ali (PAK)	4
Ramazan Palyani (TUR)	5
Falk Huste (GER)	10
Joni Turunen (FIN)	6
Bijan Batmani (IRI)
Ricardo Juarez (USA)	RSC
Kassim Napa Adam (UGA)	3
Tulkunbay Turgunov (UZB)	12
Somluck Kamsing (THA)	RSC
Andrés Ledesma (COL)
Servin Suleimanov (UKR)	4
Yuri Mladenov (BUL)	7
Hidehiko Tsukamoto (JPN)	3
Yosvani Aguilera (CUB)	RSC
Kamil Djamaloudinov (RUS)	9
Vidas Bičiulaitis (LTU)	5
Yohanes Shiferaw Yohanes (ETH)
Francisco Bojado (MEX)	RSC

Round of 16; Saturday, September 23, 2000; 13:00 & 19:30
Musa Simelane (SWZ)
Israel Hector Pérez (ARG)	RSC
Tahar Tamsamani (MAR)	21
Park Heung-min (KOR)	14
Bekzat Sattarkhanov (KAZ)	16
Jeffrey Mathebula (RSA)	5
Valdemir Pereira (BRA)
Ramazan Palyani (TUR)	RSC
Falk Huste (GER)	15
Ricardo Juarez (USA)	17
Tulkunbay Turgunov (UZB)	2
Somluck Kamsing (THA)	7
Yuri Mladenov (BUL)	8
Yosvani Aguilera (CUB)	15
Kamil Djamaloudinov (RUS)	15
Francisco Bojado (MEX)	12

Quarter-finals; Wednesday, September 27, 2000; 13:00 & 19:30
Israel Hector Pérez (ARG)	18
Tahar Tamsamani (MAR)	21
Bekzat Sattarkhanov (KAZ)	12
Ramazan Palyani (TUR)	11
Ricardo Juarez (USA)	RSC
Somluck Kamsing (THA)
Yosvani Aguilera (CUB)	12
Kamil Djamaloudinov (RUS)	17

Semi-finals; Friday, September 29, 2000; 19:30
Tahar Tamsamani (MAR)	10
Bekzat Sattarkhanov (KAZ)	22
Ricardo Juarez (USA)	23
Kamil Djamaloudinov (RUS)	12

Final; Sunday, October 1, 2000; 13:00
Bekzat Sattarkhanov (KAZ)	22
Ricardo Juarez (USA)	14
