= Boxing at the 2000 Summer Olympics =

Boxing at the Games of the XXVII Olympiad
- Venue: Sydney Convention and Exhibition Centre
- Dates: 16 September – 1 October 2000
- Competitors: 312 from 74 nations

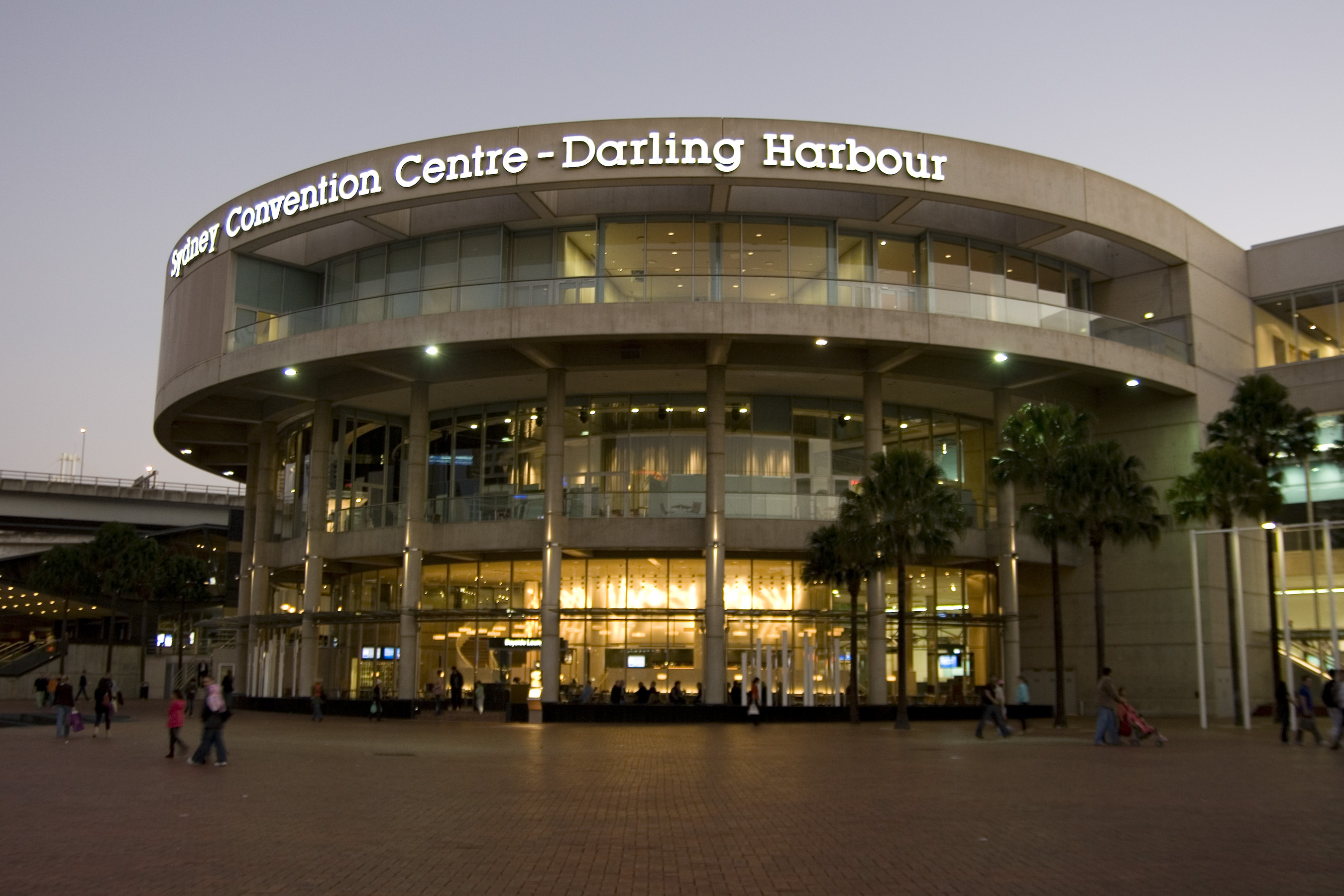
Sydney Convention and Exhibition Centre, hosted the Boxing events

The boxing competition at the 2000 Summer Olympics in Sydney, Australia was held at the Sydney Convention and Exhibition Centre in Darling Harbour. The event was only open to men and bouts were contested over four rounds of two minutes each. Five judges scored the fighters in real time and the boxer with the most points at the end was the winner.

Like other Olympic combat sports, two bronze medals are awarded; in the case of boxing, both losing semi-finalists receive a bronze medal, with no further play-off. As a result, the quarter-final essentially equates to a bronze medal match, a semi-final to a silver medal match, and the final to a gold medal match. 48 medals are therefore available, half of which are bronze medals.

== Competition format ==
Men competed in the following twelve events:

- Light flyweight (48kg)
- Flyweight (51kg)
- Bantamweight (54kg)
- Featherweight (57kg)
- Lightweight (60kg)
- Light welterweight (64kg)
- Welterweight (67kg)
- Light middleweight (71kg)
- Middleweight (75kg)
- Light heavyweight (81kg)
- Heavyweight (91kg)
- Super heavyweight (+91kg)

== Medalists ==
Event	Gold	Silver	Bronze
Light flyweight	Brahim Asloum; France	Rafael Lozano; Spain	Kim Un-chol; North Korea
Light flyweight	Brahim Asloum; France	Rafael Lozano; Spain	Maikro Romero; Cuba
Flyweight	Wijan Ponlid; Thailand	Bulat Zhumadilov; Kazakhstan	Jérôme Thomas; France
Flyweight	Wijan Ponlid; Thailand	Bulat Zhumadilov; Kazakhstan	Vladimir Sidorenko; Ukraine
Bantamweight	Guillermo Rigondeaux; Cuba	Raimkul Malakhbekov; Russia	Serhiy Danylchenko; Ukraine
Bantamweight	Guillermo Rigondeaux; Cuba	Raimkul Malakhbekov; Russia	Clarence Vinson; United States
Featherweight	Bekzat Sattarkhanov; Kazakhstan	Ricardo Juarez; United States	Tahar Tamsamani; Morocco
Featherweight	Bekzat Sattarkhanov; Kazakhstan	Ricardo Juarez; United States	Kamil Djamaloudinov; Russia
Lightweight	Mario Kindelán; Cuba	Andriy Kotelnyk; Ukraine	Cristián Bejarano; Mexico
Lightweight	Mario Kindelán; Cuba	Andriy Kotelnyk; Ukraine	Aleksandr Maletin; Russia
Light welterweight	Mahammatkodir Abdullaev; Uzbekistan	Ricardo Williams; United States	Mohamed Allalou; Algeria
Light welterweight	Mahammatkodir Abdullaev; Uzbekistan	Ricardo Williams; United States	Diógenes Luña; Cuba
Welterweight	Oleg Saitov; Russia	Sergey Dotsenko; Ukraine	Vitaly Gruşac; Moldova
Welterweight	Oleg Saitov; Russia	Sergey Dotsenko; Ukraine	Dorel Simion; Romania
Light middleweight	Yermakhan Ibraimov; Kazakhstan	Marian Simion; Romania	Pornchai Thongburan; Thailand
Light middleweight	Yermakhan Ibraimov; Kazakhstan	Marian Simion; Romania	Jermain Taylor; United States
Middleweight	Jorge Gutiérrez; Cuba	Gaydarbek Gaydarbekov; Russia	Vugar Alakbarov; Azerbaijan
Middleweight	Jorge Gutiérrez; Cuba	Gaydarbek Gaydarbekov; Russia	Zsolt Erdei; Hungary
Light heavyweight	Aleksandr Lebziak; Russia	Rudolf Kraj; Czech Republic	Andriy Fedchuk; Ukraine
Light heavyweight	Aleksandr Lebziak; Russia	Rudolf Kraj; Czech Republic	Sergey Mihaylov; Uzbekistan
Heavyweight	Félix Savón; Cuba	Sultan Ibragimov; Russia	Vladimer Tchanturia; Georgia
Heavyweight	Félix Savón; Cuba	Sultan Ibragimov; Russia	Sebastian Köber; Germany
Super heavyweight	Audley Harrison; Great Britain	Mukhtarkhan Dildabekov; Kazakhstan	Paolo Vidoz; Italy
Super heavyweight	Audley Harrison; Great Britain	Mukhtarkhan Dildabekov; Kazakhstan	Rustam Saidov; Uzbekistan

== Medal summary ==
=== Medal table ===
Rank	Nation	Gold	Silver	Bronze	Total
1	Cuba	4	0	2	6
2	Russia	2	3	2	7
3	Kazakhstan	2	2	0	4
4	Uzbekistan	1	0	2	3
5	France	1	0	1	2
5	Thailand	1	0	1	2
7	Great Britain	1	0	0	1
8	Ukraine	0	2	3	5
9	United States	0	2	2	4
10	Romania	0	1	1	2
11	Czech Republic	0	1	0	1
11	Spain	0	1	0	1
13	Algeria	0	0	1	1
13	Azerbaijan	0	0	1	1
13	Georgia	0	0	1	1
13	Germany	0	0	1	1
13	Hungary	0	0	1	1
13	Italy	0	0	1	1
13	Mexico	0	0	1	1
13	Moldova	0	0	1	1
13	Morocco	0	0	1	1
13	North Korea	0	0	1	1
Totals (22 entries)		12	12	24	48

== Participating nations ==
310 boxers from 77 nations participated in the 2000 Summer Olympics.

- Algeria (7)
- Argentina (7)
- Armenia (3)
- Australia (9)
- Azerbaijan (5)
- Barbados (1)
- Belarus (1)
- Botswana (1)
- Brazil (6)
- Bulgaria (3)
- Burkina Faso (1)
- Cameroon (2)
- Canada (7)
- China (3)
- Colombia (3)
- Cuba (12)
- Czech Republic (2)
- Dominican Republic (3)
- North Korea (1)
- Egypt (7)
- Ethiopia (3)
- Finland (1)
- France (8)
- Gabon (1)
- Georgia (2)
- Germany (8)
- Ghana (4)
- Great Britain (2)
- Greece (3)
- Guinea (81)
- Hungary (3)
- India (4)
- Indonesia (2)
- Individual Olympic Athletes (1)
- Iran (5)
- Ireland (1)
- Italy (6)
- Japan (2)
- Kazakhstan (7)
- Kenya (4)
- Kyrgyzstan (5)
- Lesotho (2)
- Lithuania (2)
- Madagascar (1)
- Mauritius (3)
- Mexico (6)
- Mongolia (1)
- Morocco (5)
- Namibia (1)
- New Zealand (1)
- Nigeria (5)
- Pakistan (4)
- Philippines (4)
- Poland (5)
- Puerto Rico (5)
- South Korea (9)
- Moldova (1)
- Romania (10)
- Russia (12)
- Samoa (1)
- Senegal (1)
- South Africa (3)
- Spain (1)
- Swaziland (1)
- Syria (2)
- Thailand (9)
- Tunisia (5)
- Turkey (9)
- Uganda (4)
- Ukraine (11)
- United States (12)
- Uzbekistan (10)
- Venezuela (4)
- FR Yugoslavia (1)
- Zambia (2)
