= Frédéric Esther =

French boxer (born 1972)

Medal record

Representing France

Men's Boxing

World Amateur Championships
Bronze medal – third place	Houston 1999	Light Middleweight

European Amateur Championships
Gold medal – first place	1998 Minsk	Light Middleweight

Frédéric Esther (born 8 June 1972 in Meulan, France) is a French former boxer, who competed in the middleweight (– 75 kg) division. He represented his native country at the 2000 Summer Olympics in Sydney, Australia, where he was stopped in the quarterfinales of the light middleweight division (– 71 kg) by eventual silver medalist Marian Simion of Romania.

Before turning professional in December 2000, Esther won the European title in 1998, and won the bronze medal at the 1999 World Amateur Boxing Championships in Houston, United States.

== Olympic results ==
- Defeated Andrey Mishin (Russia) 16-11
- Defeated Firat Karagollu (Turkey) 18-16
- Lost to Marian Simion (Romania) RSC 3
