= 1999 World Amateur Boxing Championships =

Boxing competitions

1999 AIBA World Boxing Championships
- Venue: George R. Brown Convention Center
- Location: Houston, United States
- Start date: August 15, 1999
- End date: August 29, 1999

The Men's 1999 World Amateur Boxing Championships were held in Houston, United States from August 15 to August 29. The tenth edition of this competition, a year before the Summer Olympics in Sydney, Australia, was organised by the world governing body for amateur boxing AIBA.

== Medal winners ==
Event	Gold	Silver	Bronze
Light Flyweight (– 48 kilograms)	Brian Viloria; United States	Maikro Romero; Cuba	Aleksan Nalbandyan; Russia Suban Punnon; Thailand
Flyweight (– 51 kilograms)	Bulat Jumadilov; Kazakhstan	Omar Andrés Narváez; Argentina	Waldemar Cucereanu; Romania Andrzej Rzany; Poland
Bantamweight (– 54 kilograms)	George Olteanu; Romania	Kamil Djamaloudinov; Russia	Benoit Gaudet; Canada Sachis Mechchiyev; Belarus
Featherweight (– 57 kilograms)	Ricardo Juarez; United States	Tulkunbay Turgunov; Uzbekistan	Ramaz Paliani; Turkey Ovidiu Bobîrnat; Romania
Lightweight (– 60 kilograms)	Mario Kindelán; Cuba	Aleksey Steponov; Russia	Gheorghe Lungu; Romania Dimitar Shtilianov; Bulgaria
Light Welterweight (– 63,5 kilograms)	Muhammadqodir Abdullayev; Uzbekistan	Willy Blain; France	Ali Ahraoui; Germany Lukáš Konecný; Czech Republic
Welterweight (– 67 kilograms)	Juan Hernández Sierra; Cuba	Timur Gaydalov; Russia	Leonard Bundu; Italy Lucian Bute; Romania
Light Middleweight (– 71 kilograms)	Marian Simion; Romania	Jorge Gutiérrez; Cuba	Frédéric Esther; France Yermakhan Ibraimov; Kazakhstan
Middleweight (– 75 kilograms)	Utkirbek Haydarov; Uzbekistan	Adrian Diaconu; Romania	Yevgeniy Kasantsev; Russia Akın Kuloğlu; Turkey
Light Heavyweight (– 81 kilograms)	Michael Simms; United States	John Dovi; France	Oleksiy Trofimov; Ukraine Ali Ismayilov; Azerbaijan
Heavyweight (– 91 kilograms)	Michael Bennett; United States	Félix Savón; Cuba	Kevin Evans; Wales Steffen Kretschmann; Germany
Super Heavyweight (+ 91 kilograms)	Sinan Şamil Sam; Turkey	Mukhtarkhan Dildabekov; Kazakhstan	Felix Dyachuk; Russia Paolo Vidoz; Italy

== Medal table ==
Rank	Nation	Gold	Silver	Bronze	Total
1	United States (USA)	4	0	0	4
2	Cuba (CUB)	2	3	0	5
3	Romania (ROU)	2	1	4	7
4	Uzbekistan (UZB)	2	1	0	3
5	Kazakhstan (KAZ)	1	1	1	3
6	Turkey (TUR)	1	0	2	3
7	Russia (RUS)	0	3	3	6
8	France (FRA)	0	2	1	3
9	Argentina (ARG)	0	1	0	1
10	Germany (GER)	0	0	2	2
10	Italy (ITA)	0	0	2	2
12	Azerbaijan (AZE)	0	0	1	1
12	Belarus (BLR)	0	0	1	1
12	Bulgaria (BUL)	0	0	1	1
12	Canada (CAN)	0	0	1	1
12	Czech Republic (CZE)	0	0	1	1
12	Poland (POL)	0	0	1	1
12	Thailand (THA)	0	0	1	1
12	Ukraine (UKR)	0	0	1	1
12	Wales (WAL)	0	0	1	1
Totals (20 entries)		12	12	24	48
