= Mihai Bogdan Dobrescu =

Romanian boxer (born 1976)

Personal information
- Born: November 30, 1976 (age 49) Ploiesti, Romania
Medal record
Men's Boxing
Representing Romania
European Amateur Championships
Silver medal – second place	2000 Tampere	Flyweight
European Union Amateur Championships
Bronze medal – third place	2004 Madrid	Bantamweight

Mihai Bogdan Dobrescu (born November 30, 1976, in Ploieşti, Prahova) is a boxer from Romania, who won the silver medal in the Men's Flyweight (– 51 kg) division at the 2000 European Amateur Boxing Championships in Tampere, Finland. In the final he was defeated by Ukraine's Vladimir Sidorenko.

M.B. Dobrescu represented Romania at the 2000 Summer Olympics in Sydney, Australia. There he was stopped in the second round by Cuba's Manuel Mantilla. He failed to qualify for the 2004 Summer Olympics, finishing in third place at the 3rd AIBA European 2004 Olympic Qualifying Tournament in Gothenburg, Sweden.
