= Hidehiko =

- Gender: Male

Origin
- Origin: Japanese
- Meaning: Different meanings depending on the kanji used

Hidehiko (written: 秀彦 or 英彦) is a masculine Japanese given name. Notable people with the name include:

- Hidehiko Hoshino (星野 英彦; born 1966), Japanese musician and songwriter
- Hidehiko Matsumoto (松本 英彦; 1926–2000), Japanese jazz saxophonist and bandleader
- Hidehiko Shimizu (清水 秀彦; born 1954), Japanese footballer and manager
- Hidehiko Tomizawa (冨沢 英彦; born 1946), Japanese high jumper
- Hidehiko Tsukamoto (塚本 秀彦; born 1978), Japanese boxer
- Hidehiko Yamabe (山辺 英彦; 1923–1960), Japanese mathematician
- Hidehiko Yoshida (吉田 秀彦; born 1969), Japanese judoka and mixed martial artist
- Hidehiko Yamane (山根 英彦), Japanese clothing designer
- Hidehiko Yuzaki (湯崎 英彦; born 1965), Japanese politician
