= Marian Simion =

Romanian boxer (born 1975)

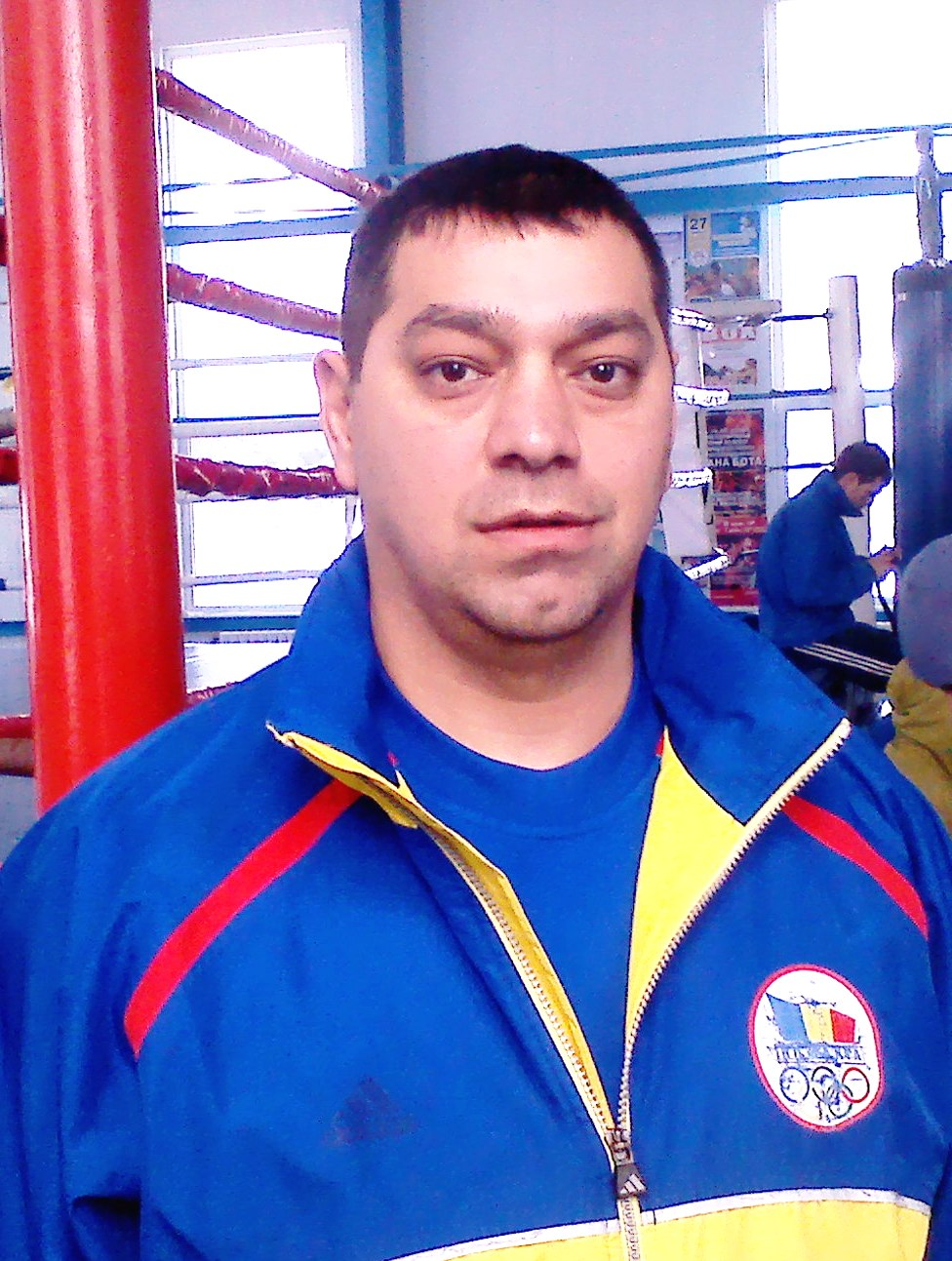
- Marian Simion in 2013

Personal information
- Born: 14 September 1975 (age 50)
Medal record
Men's Boxing
Representing Romania
Olympic Games
Silver medal – second place	2000 Sydney	Light Middleweight
Bronze medal – third place	1996 Atlanta	Welterweight
World Amateur Championships
Gold medal – first place	1999 Houston	Light Middleweight
Silver medal – second place	2001 Belfast	Light Middleweight
Bronze medal – third place	1997 Budapest	Welterweight
European Amateur Championships
Silver medal – second place	1996 Vejle	Welterweight
Bronze medal – third place	1998 Minsk	Welterweight
Bronze medal – third place	2002 Perm	Light Middleweight
EU Amateur Championships
Gold medal – first place	2004 Madrid	Middleweight
Goodwill Games
Silver medal – second place	2001 Brisbane	Light Middleweight

Marian Simion (born 14 September 1975 in București) is a Romanian boxer, who competed in the Light Middleweight (71 kg) at the 2000 Summer Olympics and won the silver medal. He repeated that feat one year later, at the 2001 World Amateur Boxing Championships in Belfast after having won the world title at the previous tournament in Houston, Texas, United States.

He is the older brother of Olympic boxer Dorel Simion. Simion qualified for the 2004 Summer Olympics by topping the 2nd AIBA European 2004 Olympic Qualifying Tournament in Warsaw, Poland. His EU Amateur Championships medals include a gold in 2004, a silver in 1996 and bronze in 1998 and 2002.

== Olympic results ==
1996

- Defeated Hussein Bayram (France) 13-6
- Defeated Fernando Vargas (United States) 8-7
- Defeated Hassan Al (Denmark) 16-8
- Lost to Juan Hernández Sierra (Cuba) 7-20

2000

- Defeated Ciro di Corcia (Italy) 19-8
- Defeated José Luis Zertuche (Mexico) RSC 3
- Defeated Frédéric Esther (France) RSC 3
- Defeated Pornchai Thongburan (Thailand) 26-16
- Lost to Yermakhan Ibraimov (Kazakhstan) 23-25

2004

- Lost to Ramadan Yasser (Egypt) 29-36
