= Jackson Asiku =

Ugandan/Australian boxer

Personal information
- Nickname: Action
- Nationality: Ugandan/Australian
- Born: 21 October 1978 (age 47) Kampala, Uganda
- Height: 5 ft 7 in (1.70 m)
- Weight: flyweight, and feather/super featherweight

Boxing career
- Reach: 67 in (170 cm)
- Stance: Orthodox

Boxing record
- Total fights: 31
- Wins: 26 (KO 14)
- Losses: 5 (KO 1)

Jackson "Action" Asiku (*21 October 1978) is a Ugandan-Australian amateur flyweight and professional feather/super featherweight boxer.

== Career ==
As an amateur, Asiku represented Uganda at the 1998 Commonwealth Games in Kuala Lumpur, Malaysia and won a bronze medal, losing to eventual gold medal winner Richard Sunee of Mauritius. In 1999, he won a bronze medal at flyweight in Boxing at the All-Africa Games in Johannesburg, South Africa, losing to eventual silver medal winner Nacer Keddam of Algeria. In 2000, he took part, in the Summer Olympics in Sydney, Australia, losing to Arlan Lerio of the Philippines. During his amateur time, Asiku boxed in flyweight.

As a professional, Asiku won the Australian featherweight title, World Boxing Organization (WBO) Asia Pacific featherweight title, African Boxing Union (ABU) featherweight title, International Boxing Federation (IBF) Australasian featherweight title, International Boxing Organization (IBO) featherweight title, and Commonwealth featherweight title, and was a challenger for the International Boxing Federation (IBF) Pan Pacific featherweight title against Fahprakorb Rakkiatgym. His professional fighting weight varied from 123 1/2 lb (56.0 kg; 8 st 11.5 lb), i.e. featherweight to 129 3/4 lb (58.9 kg; 9 st 3.8 lb), i.e. super featherweight.
