= Boxing at the 1998 Central American and Caribbean Games =

Boxing competitions

The Boxing Tournament at the 1998 Central American and Caribbean Games was held in Maracaibo, Venezuela from August 13 to August 22, 1998.

== Medal winners ==
Event	Gold	Silver	Bronze
Light Flyweight (– 48 kilograms)	Maikro Romero; Cuba	José Luis Valera; Venezuela	Liborio Romero; Mexico (Puerto Rico) Iván Calderón; Puerto Rico
Flyweight (– 51 kilograms)	Manuel Mantilla; Cuba	Yonnhy Pérez; Colombia	Leon Moore; Guyana (Dominican Republic) Eudis Mendez; Dominican Republic
Bantamweight (– 54 kilograms)	Waldemar Font; Cuba	César Morales; Mexico	Nehomar Cermeño; Venezuela (Dominican Republic) Edwin Rodríguez; Dominican Republic
Featherweight (– 57 kilograms)	Enrique Carrion; Cuba	Jairo Gonell; Dominican Republic	José Cruz Lasso; Colombia; Mark Alexander; Barbados
Lightweight (– 60 kilograms)	Mario Kindelán; Cuba	Miguel Angel Cotto; Puerto Rico	Marco Tulio Aceituno; Guatemala; Carlos Castro; Dominican Republic
Light Welterweight (– 63.5 kilograms)	Roberto Guerra; Cuba	Francisco Joya Rizo; Nicaragua	Isidro Mosquea; Dominican Republic; Naudy Rafael Mendoza; Venezuela
Welterweight (– 67 kilograms)	Diógenes Luña; Cuba	José Luis Zertuche; Mexico	Julio Jean; Haiti; Charly Navarro; Venezuela
Light Middleweight (– 71 kilograms)	Hely Yanes; Venezuela	Marcus Thomas; Barbados	David Sánchez; Mexico; Isaac Caballero; Nicaragua
Middleweight (– 75 kilograms)	Ariel Hernandez; Cuba	José Luis Herrera; Colombia	Michael Brooks; Jamaica (Trinidad and Tobago) Kurt Sinette; Trinidad
Light Heavyweight (– 81 kilograms)	Humberto Savigne; Cuba	Francisco Alvarez; Puerto Rico	Francisco García; Dominican Republic; Shawn Cox; Barbados
Heavyweight (– 91 kilograms)	Félix Savón; Cuba	Jhony Alexander Molina; Venezuela	Alejandro Virgen Haro; Mexico; Tomas Orozco; Colombia
Super Heavyweight (+ 91 kilograms)	Freddy Soto; Cuba	Owen Black; Jamaica	Felipe Bojorquez; Mexico
