= Boxing at the 2004 Summer Olympics – Flyweight =

Flyweight boxing at the Games of the XXVIII Olympiad
- Venue: Peristeri Olympic Boxing Hall
- Date: 17–28 August 2004
- Competitors: 28 from 28 nations

Medalists
1st place, gold medalist(s)		Yuriorkis Gamboa	Cuba
2nd place, silver medalist(s)		Jérôme Thomas	France
3rd place, bronze medalist(s)		Fuad Aslanov	Azerbaijan
3rd place, bronze medalist(s)		Rustamhodza Rahimov	Germany

The flyweight boxing competition at the 2004 Summer Olympics in Athens, Greece, was held from 17 to 28 August at the Peristeri Olympic Boxing Hall. The event was open to boxers weighing between 49 and 51 kilograms.

== Competition format ==
Like all Olympic boxing events, the competition followed a straight single-elimination format. The event featured 28 boxers who qualified through various tournaments held in 2003 and 2004.

The competition began with a preliminary round on 17 August, reducing the field to 16 boxers, and concluded with the final on 28 August. Since there were fewer than 32 competitors, some boxers received a bye through the preliminary round. Both semi-final losers were awarded bronze medals, in accordance with Olympic boxing rules.

Each bout consisted of four rounds lasting two minutes each, with one-minute breaks between rounds. Punches scored only if the white area on the front of the glove made full contact with the front of the opponent’s head or torso. Five judges scored each bout, and for a punch to count, at least three of the five judges had to register it as a scoring punch within one second. The winner of the bout was the boxer who landed the most valid punches by the end of the match.

== Schedule ==
All times are Greece Standard Time (UTC+2)

Date	Time	Round
Tuesday, 17 August 2004	13:30 & 19:30	Round of 32
Saturday, 21 August 2004	19:30	Round of 16
Wednesday, 25 August 2004	19:30	Quarterfinals
Friday, 27 August 2004	13:30	Semifinals
Saturday, 28 August 2004	19:30	Final

== Qualifying Athletes ==
Athlete	Country
Rustamhodza Rahimov	Germany
Óscar Escandón	Colombia
Paulus Ambunda	Namibia
Jonny Mendoza	Venezuela
Somjit Jongjohor	Thailand
Kim Ki-Suk	South Korea
Yuriorkis Gamboa	Cuba
Igor Samoilenco	Moldova
Mirzhan Rakhimzhanov	Kazakhstan
Joseph Serrano	Puerto Rico
Mebarek Soltani	Algeria
Georgy Balakshin	Russia
Bonyx Yusak SAweho	Indonesia
Andrzej Rżany	Poland
Hicham Mesbahi	Morocco
Lechedzani Luza	Botswana
Nikoloz Izoria	Georgia
Walid Cherif	Tunisia
George Rakotoarimbelo	Madagascar
Fuad Aslanov	Azerbaijan
Akhil Kumar	India
Jérôme Thomas	France
Juan Carlos Payano	Dominican Republic
Bato-Munko Vankeev	Belarus
Ronald Siler	United States
Bradley Hore	Australia
Violito Payla	Philippines
Tulashboy Doniyorov	Uzbekistan

== Results ==
Round of 32
Somjit Jongjohor (THA)	22
Kim Ki-Suk (KOR)	12
Yuriorkis Gamboa (CUB)	46
Igor Samoilenco (MDA)	33
Mirzhan Rakhimzhanov (KAZ)	42
Joseph Serrano (PUR)	23
Mebarek Soltani (ALG)	15
Georgy Balakshin (RUS)	26
Bonyx Yusak Saweho (INA)	19
Andrzej Rżany (POL)	25
Hicham Mesbahi (MAR)	25
Lechedzani Luza (BOT)	20
Nikoloz Izoria (GEO)	24
Walid Cherif (TUN)	14
George Rakotoarimbelo (MAD)
Fuad Aslanov (AZE)	WO
Akhil Kumar (IND)	16
Jérôme Thomas (FRA)	37
Juan Carlos Payano (DOM)	26
Bato-Munko Vankeev (BLR)	18
Ronald Siler (USA)	32
Bradley Hore (AUS)	18
Violito Payla (PHI)	26
Tulashboy Doniyorov (UZB)	36

Round of 16
Rustamhodza Rahimov (GER)	25
Óscar Escandón (COL)	15
Paulus Ambunda (NAM)	39
Jonny Mendoza (VEN)	19
Somjit Jongjohor (THA)	21
Yuriorkis Gamboa (CUB)	26
Mirzhan Rakhimzhanov (KAZ)	20
Georgy Balakshin (RUS)	29
Andrzej Rżany (POL)	33
Hicham Mesbahi (MAR)	20
Nikoloz Izoria (GEO)	21
Fuad Aslanov (AZE)	27
Jérôme Thomas (FRA)	36
Juan Carlos Payano (DOM)	17
Ronald Siler (USA)	22
Tulashboy Doniyorov (UZB)	45

Quarterfinals
Rustamhodza Rahimov (GER)	28
Paulus Ambunda (NAM)	15
Yuriorkis Gamboa (CUB)	26
Georgy Balakshin (RUS)	18
Andrzej Rżany (POL)	23
Fuad Aslanov (AZE)	24
Jérôme Thomas (FRA)	25
Tulashboy Doniyorov (UZB)	16

Semifinals
Rustamhodza Rahimov (GER)	11
Yuriorkis Gamboa (CUB)	20
Fuad Aslanov (AZE)	18
Jérôme Thomas (FRA)	23

Final
Yuriorkis Gamboa (CUB)	38
Jérôme Thomas (FRA)	23
