= Ireland at the 2000 Summer Olympics =

- IOC code: IRL
- NOC: Olympic Federation of Ireland
- Website: olympics.ie

in Sydney
- Competitors: 64 (40 men and 24 women) in 10 sports
- Flag bearer: Sonia O'Sullivan
- Medals Ranked 64th: Gold 0 Silver 1 Bronze 0 Total 1

Summer Olympics appearances (overview)
- 1924; 1928; 1932; 1936; 1948; 1952; 1956; 1960; 1964; 1968; 1972; 1976; 1980; 1984; 1988; 1992; 1996; 2000; 2004; 2008; 2012; 2016; 2020; 2024

Other related appearances
- Great Britain (1896–1920)

Ireland competed at the 2000 Summer Olympics in Sydney, Australia.

== Medalists ==
Medal	Name	Sport	Event
Silver	Sonia O'Sullivan	Athletics	Women's 5000m

== Results by event ==
=== Athletics ===
==== Men's Competition ====
Men's 100m

- Paul Brizzell

- Round 1 – 10.62 (→ did not advance)

Men's 200m

- Paul Brizzell

- Round 1 – 20.98 (→ did not advance)

Men's 400m

- Tomas Coman

- Round 1 – 46.17 (→ did not advance)

Men's 800m

- David Matthews

- Round 1 – 01:48.77 (→ did not advance)

Men's 1,500m

- James Nolan

- Round 1 – 03:40.50 (→ did not advance)

Men's 5,000m

- Mark Carroll

- Round 1 – 13:30.60 (→ did not advance)

Men's 110m Hurdles

- Peter Coghlan

- Round 1 – 14.03
- Round 2 – 13.86 (→ did not advance)

Men's 400m Hurdles

- Tom McGuirk

- Round 1 – 51.73 (→ did not advance)

Men's 4 × 100 m

- Paul Brizzell, Tom Comyns, John McAdorey, Gary Ryan

- Round 1 – 39.26 (→ did not advance)

Men's 4 × 400 m

- Tomas Coman, Robert Daly, Paul "Junior" McKee, Paul Oppermann

- Round 1 – 03:07.42 (→ did not advance)

Men's High Jump

- Brendan Reilly

- Qualifying – 2.20 (→ did not advance)

Men's Discus

- Nick Sweeney

- Qualifying – 57.37 (→ did not advance)

- John Menton

- Qualifying – 54.21 (→ did not advance)

Men's Javelin Throw

- Terry McHugh

- Qualifying – 79.90 (→ did not advance)

Men's Hammer Throw

- Paddy McGrath

- Qualifying – 67.00 (→ did not advance)

Men's 20 km Walk

- Robert Heffernan

- Final – 1:26:04 (→ 28th place)

Men's 50 km Walk

- Jamie Costin

- Final – 4:24:22 (→ 38th place)

==== Women's Competition ====
Women's 100m

- Sarah Reilly

- Round 1 – 11.56
- Round 2 – 11.53 (→ did not advance)

Women's 200m

- Sarah Reilly

- Round 1 – 23.43 (→ did not advance)

Women's 400m

- Karen Shinkins

- Round 1 – 53.27 (→ did not advance)

Women's 1,500m

- Sinead Delahunty

- Round 1 – 04:11.75 (→ did not advance)

Women's 5,000m

- Sonia O'Sullivan

- Round 1 – 15:07.91
- Final – 14:41.02 (→ Silver Medal)

- Rosemary Ryan

- Round 1 – 15:33.05 (→ did not advance)

- Breda Dennehy-Willis

- Round 1 – 15:49.58 (→ did not advance)

Women's 10,000m

- Sonia O'Sullivan

- Round 1 – 32:29.93
- Final – 30:53.37 (→ 6th place)

- Breda Dennehy-Willis

- Round 1 – 33:17.45 (→ did not advance)

Women's 400m Hurdles

- Susan Smith-Walsh

- Round 1 – 57.08 (→ did not advance)

Women's 4 × 400 m

- Emily Maher, Martina McCarthy, Ciara Sheehy, Karen Shinkins

- Round 1 – 03:32.24 (→ did not advance)

Women's 20 km Walk

- Gillian O'Sullivan

- Final – 1:33:10 (→ 10th place)

- Olive Loughnane

- Final – 1:38:23 (→ 35th place)

=== Badminton ===
Women's Singles

- Sonya McGinn

- Round of 64: Bye
- Round of 32: Lost to Mia Audina Tjiptawan of Netherlands (→ did not advance)

=== Boxing ===
Men's 71 kg

- Michael Roche

- Round 1 – Lost to Firat Karagollu of Turkey (→ did not advance)

=== Canoe / Kayak ===
==== Flatwater ====
===== Men's Competition =====
Men's Kayak Singles 500m

- Gary Mawer

- Qualifying Heat – 01:49.705 (→ did not advance)

Men's Kayak Singles 1000m

- Gary Mawer

- Qualifying Heat – 03:45.787
- Semifinal – 03:50.363 (→ did not advance)

==== Slalom ====
===== Men's Competition =====
Men's Kayak Singles

- Ian Wiley

- Qualifying – 266.42 (→ did not advance)

===== Women's Competition =====
Women's Kayak Singles

- Eadaoin Ní Challarain

- Qualifying – 331.49 (→ did not advance)

=== Cycling ===
==== Cross Country Mountain Bike ====
Men's Cross Country Mountain Bike

- Robin Seymour

- Final – 2:20:40.19 (→ 28th place)

Women's Cross Country Mountain Bike

- Tarja Owens

- Final – Lapped (→ 29th place)

==== Road Cycling ====
===== Men's Competition =====
Men's Road Race

- David McCann

- Final – 5:30:46 (→ 43rd place)

- Ciarán Power

- Final – 5:34:58 (→ 74th place)

===== Women's Competition =====
Women's Road Race

- Deirdre Murphy

- Final – DNF (→ no ranking)

=== Rowing ===
Men's Lightweight Fours

- Neville Maxwell 5th in the B final (→ 11th)
- Neal Byrne 5th in the B final (→ 11th)
- Gearoid Towey 5th in the B final (→ 11th)
- Tony O'Connor 5th in the B final (→ 11th)

=== Sailing ===
Men's Single Handed Dinghy (Finn)

- David Burrows

- Race 1 – 9
- Race 2 – (16)
- Race 3 – 7
- Race 4 – 15
- Race 5 – (19)
- Race 6 – 1
- Race 7 – 10
- Race 8 – 1
- Race 9 – 6
- Race 10 – 12
- Race 11 – 8
- Final – 69 (→ 9th place)

Men's Two Handed Keelboat (Star)

- Mark Mansfield and David O'Brien

- Race 1 – (15)
- Race 2 – 12
- Race 3 – 12
- Race 4 – 10
- Race 5 – 7
- Race 6 – 9
- Race 7 – 13
- Race 8 – 3
- Race 9 – 11
- Race 10 – 13
- Race 11 – (17) OCS
- Final – 90 (→ 14th place)

Women's Single Handed Dinghy (Europe)

- Maria Coleman

- Race 1 – 11
- Race 2 – 5
- Race 3 – 3
- Race 4 – 15
- Race 5 – (17)
- Race 6 – 7
- Race 7 – 11
- Race 8 – (17)
- Race 9 – 9
- Race 10 – 14
- Race 11 – 11
- Final – 86 (→ 12th place)

=== Swimming ===
Men

Athlete	Event	Heat		Semifinal		Final	
Athlete	Event	Time	Rank	Time	Rank	Time	Rank
Andrew Bree	100 m breaststroke	1:04.58	41	Did not advance			
Andrew Bree	200 m breaststroke	2:18.14	27	Did not advance			
Colin Lowth	200 m butterfly	2:03.91	37	Did not advance			

Women

Athlete	Event	Heat		Semifinal		Final	
Athlete	Event	Time	Rank	Time	Rank	Time	Rank
Chantal Gibney	50 m freestyle	27.46	48	Did not advance			
Chantal Gibney	100 m freestyle	58.79	42	Did not advance			
Chantal Gibney	200 m freestyle	2:05.24	28	Did not advance			
Chantal Gibney	400 m freestyle	4:23.73	34	—		Did not advance	
Emma Robinson	100 m breaststroke	1:13.41	29	Did not advance			
