= Sidy Sandy =

Guinean boxer (born 1974)

Personal information
- Nationality: Guinean
- Born: 31 March 1974 (age 50)

Sport
- Sport: Boxing

Sidy Sandy (born 31 March 1974) is a Guinean boxer. He competed in the men's light middleweight event at the 2000 Summer Olympics.
