= Servin Suleimanov =

Ukrainian boxer

Personal information
- Nationality: Ukrainian
- Born: 25 January 1980 (age 46) Chkalovsk, Tajik Soviet Socialist Republic, Soviet Union

Sport
- Sport: Boxing
Medal record
Men's amateur boxing
Representing Ukraine
Junior World Championships
Gold medal – first place	1998 Buenos Aires	Featherweight

Servin Suleimanov (born 25 January 1980) is a Ukrainian boxer. He competed in the men's featherweight event at the 2000 Summer Olympics.
