= Celestin Augustin =

Malagasy boxer (born 1971)

Personal information
- Nationality: Malagasy
- Born: 14 January 1971 (age 54); Madagascar
- Height: 160 cm (5 ft 3 in)
- Weight: 51 kg (112 lb)

Sport
- Country: Madagascar
- Sport: Boxing

Celestin Augustin (born 14 January 1971) is a Malagasy Olympic boxer. He represented his country in the flyweight division at the 2000 Summer Olympics. He lost in his first bout to Polish boxer Andrzej Rżany.
