= Erle Wiltshire =

Australian boxer

Erle David Wiltshire
- Occupation(s): Boxing Coach and Texture Coater

Erle Wiltshire (born 18 January 1973 in Pyin U Lwin, Mandalay) is an Australian former flyweight boxer, who was born in Burma. He represented his second country at the 2000 Summer Olympics in Sydney, Australia. There he was eliminated in the first round by France's Jérôme Thomas.

Wiltshire won the Australian championship in his division in 1997, 1998 and 2003, when he also claimed a gold medal at the International Invitational tournament in Sydney in December 1999.

He was an Australian Institute of Sport scholarship holder.
