= Yohanes Shiferaw Yohanes =

Ethiopian boxer (born 1973)

Personal information
- Nationality: Ethiopian
- Born: 12 December 1973 (age 51)

Sport
- Sport: Boxing

Yohanes Shiferaw Yohanes (born 12 December 1973) is an Ethiopian boxer. He competed in the men's featherweight event at the 2000 Summer Olympics.
