= Kassim Napa Adam =

Ugandan boxer

Personal information
- Nationality: Ugandan
- Born: 25 May 1976 (age 49)

Sport
- Sport: Boxing

Kassim Napa Adam (born 25 May 1976) is a Ugandan boxer. He competed in the men's featherweight event at the 2000 Summer Olympics.
