= Joni Turunen =

Finnish boxer

Personal information
- Nationality: Finnish
- Born: 9 April 1976 (age 49) Vantaa, Finland

Sport
- Sport: Boxing

Joni Turunen (born 9 September 1976) is a Finnish boxer. He competed in the men's featherweight event at the 2000 Summer Olympics. Two time medalist in world boxing championships, Berlin 1995 bronze medal in flyweight, and Belfast 2001 bronze medal in featherweight. Last Finnish male boxer in olympic games.
