= Drissa Tou =

Burkinabé boxer (born 1973)

Personal information
- Born: 1 January 1973 (age 52)

Sport
- Sport: Boxing

Drissa Tou (born 1 January 1973) is a Burkinabé boxer who competed at the 2000 Summer Olympics.

Tou competed in the flyweight division, and after a walkover in the first round he lost to Frenchman Jérôme Thomas in the next round, who went on to win the bronze medal.
