= Yuri Mladenov =

Bulgarian boxer

Personal information
- Nationality: Bulgarian
- Born: 22 August 1977 (age 47)

Sport
- Sport: Boxing

Yuri Mladenov (born 22 August 1977) is a Bulgarian boxer. He competed in the men's featherweight event at the 2000 Summer Olympics.
