= Andrzej Rżany =

Polish boxer

Personal information
- Nationality: Poland
- Born: 26 September 1973 (age 52) Mielec, Podkarpackie, Poland
- Height: 1.64 m (5 ft 5 in)
- Weight: 51 kg (112 lb)

Sport
- Sport: Boxing
- Weight class: Flyweight
- Club: Gwardia Wrocław
Medal record
World Amateur Championships
Bronze medal – third place	1999 Houston	Flyweight
European Amateur Championships
Bronze medal – third place	2004 Pula	Flyweight
EU Amateur Championships
Silver medal – second place	2005 Cagliari	Flyweight

Andrzej Rżany (born 26 September 1973) is a boxer from Poland.

He participated in the 2004 Summer Olympics where he was stopped in the quarterfinals of the Flyweight (51 kg) division by Azerbaijan's eventual bronze medalist Fuad Aslanov.

Rżany won the bronze medal in the same division six months earlier, at the 2004 European Amateur Boxing Championships in Pula. In addition he won the bronze medal at the 1999 World Amateur Boxing Championships, and reached the quarterfinals at the 2000 Olympics.

== Olympic results ==
1992 (as a light Flyweight)

- Lost to Rajendra Prasad (India) 6–12

2000 (as a flyweight)

- Defeated Celestin Augustin (Madagascar) 15–13
- Defeated Arlan Lerio (Philippines)
- Lost to Wladimir Sidorenko (Ukraine) RSC 3

2004 (as a flyweight)

- Defeated Bonyx Yusak Saweho (Indonesia) 25–19
- Defeated Hicham Mesbahi (Morocco) 33–20
- Lost to Fuad Aslanov (Azerbaijan) 21–22
