= Issah Samir =

Ghanaian boxer (born 1989)

Personal information
- Born: July 26, 1989 (age 37)
Medal record
Representing Ghana
Men's Boxing
All-Africa Games
Silver medal – second place	2007 Algiers	Bantamweight

Issa/Issah Samir (born July 26, 1989) is a Ghanaian boxer who won silver in the bantamweight division at the 2007 All-Africa Games and qualified for the 2008 Summer Olympics. He is the brother of light-heavyweight Bastir Samir.

== Career ==
At the All-Africa Games, he lost the final to local Algerian Abdelhalim Ouradi. At the first qualifier, he lost to Morocco's Hicham Mesbahi, but won the second African qualifier beating Mauritian southpaw Bruno Julie in the final. He lost his Olympic debut to Héctor Manzanilla 10:13. As a professional, he won the Ghanaian National Super Welterweight Champion against Ishmael Tetteh on September 29, 2012, and also won an IBF Super Welterweight Youth World Title against Robizon Omsarashvili of Georgia on May 3, 2013, via TKO round 3 at the Accra Sports Stadium. Issah won the title coming into the fight as an undefeated with 12 fights with 11 ko's.
