= Waldemar Font =

Cuban boxer

Waldemar Fonst
Personal information
- Full name: Waldemar Font Quintero
- Nationality: Cuba
- Born: Havana, Cuba

Sport
- Sport: Boxing
- Weight class: Flyweight/Bantamweight
Medal record
Men's amateur boxing
Representing CUB
World Amateur Championships
Gold medal – first place	1993 Tampere	Flyweight (-51 kg)
Silver medal – second place	1997 Budapest	Bantamweight (-54 kg)
Central American and Caribbean Games
Gold medal – first place	1998 Maracaibo	Bantamweight (-54 kg)
Goodwill Games
Silver medal – second place	1998 New York	Bantamweight (-54 kg)
Pan American Games
Bronze medal – third place	1999 Winnipeg	Bantamweight (-54 kg)

Waldemar Font Quintero is a Cuban former amateur boxer who won the World Amateur Championships as a flyweight at Tampere in 1993.

While competing at the 1994 Goodwill Games, Font tested positive for the banned diuretic furosemide and had to forfeit the flyweight gold medal that he won there, in addition to receiving a two-year ban.

Font had a successful return to boxing, winning a silver medal at the 1997 World Amateur Boxing Championships, as a bantamweight. He was a gold medalist at the 1998 Central American and Caribbean Games, silver medalist at the 1998 Goodwill Games and bronze medalist at the 1999 Pan American Games.
