= Nick Farrell =

Canadian boxer

Nick Farrell (born December 17, 1975) is a retired boxer from Canada.

Farrell was born in East York, Ontario. He competed in the light middleweight (< 71 kg) division at the 1996 Summer Olympics in Atlanta. There he was stopped in the first round by Kazakhstan's eventual bronze medalist Yermakhan Ibraimov.
