= Song In-joon =

Korean male boxer

Personal information
- Nationality: South Korean
- Born: 8 October 1977 (age 47)

Sport
- Sport: Boxing

Song In-joon (born 8 October 1977) is a South Korean boxer. He competed in the men's light middleweight event at the 2000 Summer Olympics.
