= Halil İbrahim Turan =

Turkish boxer

Personal information
- Nationality: Turkish
- Born: 10 June 1980 (age 46) Istanbul, Turkey

Sport
- Sport: Boxing

Halil İbrahim Turan (born 10 June 1980) is a Turkish boxer. He competed in the men's flyweight event at the 2000 Summer Olympics.

== Boxing career ==
=== 2000 Summer Olympics ===
He was on 17th place.
