= Park Heung-min =

Korean male boxer

Personal information
- Nationality: South Korean
- Born: 14 July 1978 (age 46)

Sport
- Sport: Boxing

Park Heung-min (born 14 July 1978) is a South Korean boxer. He competed in the men's featherweight event at the 2000 Summer Olympics.
