= Tulkunbay Turgunov =

Uzbekistani boxer (born 1977)

Personal information
- Born: February 6, 1977 (age 49) Qorasuv, Uzbek SSR, Soviet Union
Medal record
Men's Boxing
Representing Uzbekistan
World Amateur Championships
Silver medal – second place	Houston 1999	Featherweight

Tulkunbay Turgunov (born February 6, 1977) is a boxer from Uzbekistan.

He participated in the 2000 Summer Olympics for his native Central Asian country. There he was stopped in the second round of the Featherweight (57 kg) division by Thailand's Somluck Kamsing, the reigning Olympic champion.

Turgunov won the silver medal in the same division one year earlier, at the 1999 World Amateur Boxing Championships in Houston, Texas.
