= Hidehiko Tsukamoto =

Japanese boxer

Personal information
- Nationality: Japanese
- Born: 24 January 1978 (age 47); Hiroshima, Japan

Sport
- Sport: Boxing

Hidehiko Tsukamoto (塚本 秀彦, Tsukamoto Hidehiko, born 24 January 1978) is a Japanese boxer. He competed in the men's featherweight event at the 2000 Summer Olympics.
