= Andrés Ledesma =

Colombian boxer

Personal information
- Nationality: Colombian
- Born: 7 January 1980 (age 45); Arjona, Colombia

Sport
- Sport: Boxing

Andrés Ledesma (born 7 January 1980) is a Colombian boxer. He competed in the men's featherweight event at the 2000 Summer Olympics.
