= Bekzat Sattarkhanov =

Kazakhstani boxer (1980–2000)

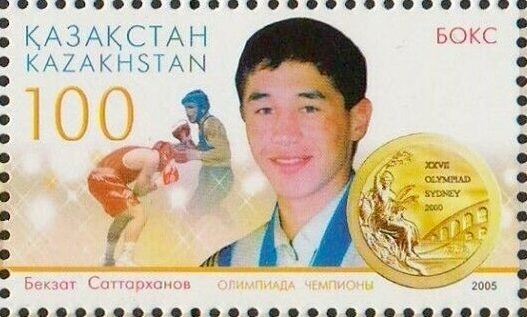

Personal information
- Born: 4 April 1980 Turkistan, Kazakh SSR, Soviet Union
- Died: 31 December 2000 (aged 20) Shymkent, Kazakhstan
- Height: 169 cm (5 ft 7 in)
- Weight: 57 kg (126 lb)

Sport
- Sport: boxing
Medal record
Representing Kazakhstan
Gold medal – first place	2000 Sydney	Featherweight
Asian Championships
Silver medal – second place	1999 Tashkent	Featherweight

Bekzat Seilkhanovich Sattarkhanov (Kazakh: Бекзат Сеилханович Саттарханов; 4 April 1980 – 31 December 2000) was a Kazakh boxer who competed in the men's featherweight division (57 kg) at the 2000 Summer Olympics and won the gold medal.

Sattarkhanov died in a car accident in his native Kazakhstan on New Year's Eve 2000. Two others in the car survived.

== Olympic results ==
- 2000 won the gold medal at the Sydney Olympics as a Featherweight. Results were:
  - Round of 32: Defeated Ovidiu Bobirnat of Romania – PTS (11–5)
  - Round of 16: Defeated Jeffrey Mathebula of South Africa – PTS (16–5)
  - Quarterfinal: Defeated Ramazan Palyani of Turkey – PTS (12–11)
  - Semifinal: Defeated Tahar Tamsamani of Morocco – PTS (22–10)
  - Final: Defeated Ricardo Juarez of the United States – PTS (22–14)

== Bibliography ==
- Bekzat [English, Kazakh & Russian Edition], Yeszhan S. Aynabekov & Nesyp Zhunysbayuly, Kazygurt: Almaty 2006, ISBN 9965221804, ISBN 9789965221804.
