= Yermakhan Ibraimov =

Kazakh boxer (born 1972)

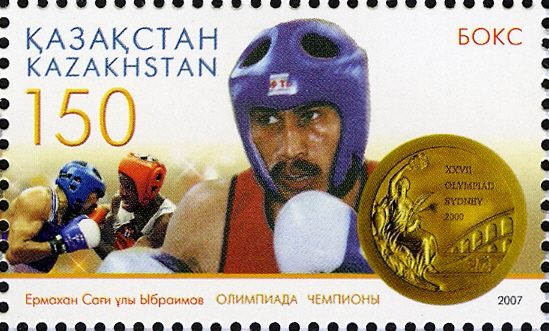
- Ibraimov depicted on a 2007 stamp from Kazakhstan

Personal information
- Full name: Ермахан Ибраимов
- Nationality: Kazakhstan
- Born: 1 January 1972 (age 54) Jambyl Region, Kazakh SSR, Soviet Union
- Height: 1.80 m (5 ft 11 in)
- Weight: 71 kg (157 lb)

Sport
- Sport: Boxing
- Weight class: Light-Middleweight
Medal record
Olympic Games
Bronze medal – third place	1996 Atlanta	Light Middleweight
Gold medal – first place	2000 Sydney	Light Middleweight
World Amateur Championships
Silver medal – second place	1997 Budapest	Light Middleweight
Bronze medal – third place	1999 Houston	Light Middleweight
Asian Games
Gold medal – first place	1998 Bangkok	Light Middleweight
Asian Amateur Boxing Championships
Gold medal – first place	1999 Tashkent	Light Middleweight

Yermakhan Ibraimov (born 1 January 1972 in Jambyl Region) is a Kazakh boxer who competed in the Light Middleweight (71 kg) at the 2000 Summer Olympics and won the gold medal. Four years earlier, at the 1996 Summer Olympics in Atlanta, he got a bronze medal. He also won a bronze at the 1999 World Amateur Boxing Championships in Houston, Texas, and a silver at the previous edition in Budapest. His first coach is Bakshar Karsybaev. After his competitive career, Ibraimov worked to support youth sport in Kazakhstan.

== Olympic results ==
1996

- Defeated Nick Farrell (Canada) 15–4
- Defeated Hendrik Simangunsong (Indonesia) RSC 1 (2:14)
- Defeated Markus Beyer (Germany) 19–9
- Lost to Alfredo Duvergel (Cuba) 19–28

2000

- Defeated Yousif Massas (Syria) RSC 3
- Defeated Hely Yánes (Venezuela) RSC 3
- Defeated Juan Hernández Sierra (Cuba) 16–9
- Defeated Jermain Taylor (United States) RSC 4
- Defeated Marian Simion (Romania) 25–23

Olympic Games
Preceded by Kayrat Biekenov	Flagbearer for Kazakhstan; Atlanta 1996	Succeeded by Vladimir Smirnov
Preceded by Vladimir Smirnov	Flagbearer for Kazakhstan; Sydney 2000	Succeeded by Radik Bikchentayev
