= Andrew Kooner =

Canadian-British boxer

Personal information
- Full name: Andrew Singh Kooner
- Nationality: Canadian
- Born: 11 May 1979 (age 47) Kettering, Northamptonshire
- Height: 1.65 m (5 ft 5 in)
- Weight: 54 kg (119 lb)

Sport
- Sport: Boxing
- Weight class: Flyweight and Bantamweight
- Club: Windsor Amateur Boxing Club
Medal record
Commonwealth Games
Silver medal – second place	2002 Manchester	Bantamweight
Pan American Games
Bronze medal – third place	2003 Santo Domingo	Bantamweight

Andrew Singh Kooner (born 11 May 1979 in Kettering, Northamptonshire, England) is a Canadian boxer and trainer, currently living in Toronto.

== Amateur career ==
Andrew Kooner moved to Tecumseh, Ontario at a young age and began boxing at age 13 out of a Windsor boxing club. At the 2000 Summer Olympics he lost in the 2nd round in the flyweight division. He won a bronze medal at the 1998 Commonwealth Games; and the silver medal at the 2002 Commonwealth Games. At the 2004 Summer Olympics he finished tied for fifth in the bantamweight (54 kg) division after having qualified at the 1st AIBA American 2004 Olympic Qualifying Tournament in Tijuana, Mexico. He also defeated Juan Manuel López in the amateurs.

=== Olympic results ===
2000 Olympics

- Defeated Nacer Keddam (Algeria) 18–11
- Lost to Wijan Ponlid (Thailand) 7–11

2004 Olympics

- Defeated Alexander Espinoza (Venezuela) 37–20
- Lost to Bahirdirdjon Sultanov (Uzbekistan) 32–44

== Pro career ==
Kooner turned pro in 2006 and has a 10-2 Record and is the current bantamweight champion of Canada.

== Post Boxing ==
Andrew Kooner currently resides in Toronto and runs his own fitness program, Kooner's Boxing, providing specialized training ranging from fitness to well-being to training up-and-coming boxers. He is also a coach for Rock Steady Boxing, a program that gives people with Parkinson's disease hope by improving their quality of life through a non-contact boxing-based fitness curriculum.
