= Michael Roche (boxer) =

Irish boxer

Personal information
- Nationality: Irish
- Born: 11 September 1971 (age 53); Kilcuddy, Ireland

Sport
- Sport: Boxing

Michael Roche (born 11 September 1971) is an Irish boxer. He competed in the men's light middleweight event at the 2000 Summer Olympics.
