= Stéphane N'Zue Mba =

Gabonese boxer (born 1979)

Stéphane N'Zue Mba (born 22 June 1979) is a Gabonese light middleweight boxer. Mba represented Gabon at the 2000 Summer Olympics, where he lost his only match to Cuban Juan Hernández Sierra.
