= Israel Héctor Perez =

Argentine boxer

Israel Perez
Personal information
- Nickname: Cachito
- Born: Israel Hector Enrique Perez; 21 April 1979 (age 47) Buenos Aires, Argentina
- Weight: Super featherweight

Boxing career
- Stance: Orthodox

Boxing record
- Total fights: 31
- Wins: 27
- Win by KO: 16
- Losses: 3
- Draws: 1

Israel Héctor Enrique Perez (born April 21, 1979) is a featherweight boxer from Argentina, who represented his native country at the 2000 Summer Olympics in Sydney, Australia.

== Boxing career ==
Nicknamed "Cachito", he made his professional debut in 2003. He won eight professional bouts in a row, before losing by split decision to John Nolasco of the Dominican Republic. As of November 2006, Perez had compiled a record of 17-2 (10 KO).

== Professional boxing record ==
27 wins (16 knockouts), 2 losses, 1 draw
Res.	Record	Opponent	Type	Rd., time	Date	Location	Notes
Win	27–3–1	(Japan) Takashi Uchiyama	RTD	9 (12)	2014-12-31	Ota-City General Gymnasium, Tokyo, Japan	For WBA World Super Featherweight title.
Win	27–2–1	(Argentina) Carlos Ricardo Rodriguez	RTD	8 (10)	2014-08-01	Club Unión Eléctrica, Cordoba, Cordoba, Argentina	
Win	26–2–1	(Dominican Republic) Francisco Lorenzo	RTD	7 (10)	2013-07-20	Salon de Fiestas Egeo, Paysandu, Uruguay	
Win	25–2–1	(Argentina) Diego Herminio Sananco	UD	6 (6)	2012-12-14	Sociedad General Belgrano, Cordoba, Cordoba, Argentina	
Win	24–2–1	(Colombia) Orlen Padilla	TKO	3 (10)	2012-11-03	Club La Unión, Colon, Entre Rios, Argentina	Won vacant WBC Latino super featherweight title
Draw	23–2–1	(Argentina) Miguel Leonardo Caceres	SD	6 (6)	2010-11-19	Estadio Aldo Cantoni, San Juan, San Juan, Argentina	
Win	23–2	(Argentina) Alberto Leopoldo Santillan	UD	10 (10)	2009-08-08	Polideportivo Carlos Cerutti, Cordoba, Cordoba, Argentina	
Win	22–2	(Brazil) Daniel Souza Santos	TKO	5 (6)	2009-05-16	Palacio Peñarol, Montevideo, Uruguay	
Win	21–2	(Argentina) Hugo Orlando Fernandez	UD	6 (6)	2007-12-08	Club Tomas de Rocamora, Concepción del Uruguay, Entre Rios, Argentina	
Win	20–2	(Nicaragua) Rene Gonzalez	MD	12 (12)	2007-05-12	Casino Pharaohs, Managua, Nicaragua	
Win	19–2	(Argentina) Hugo Orlando Fernandez	TKO	5 (6)	2007-04-07	Ce.De.M. N° 2, Caseros, Buenos Aires, Argentina	
Win	18–2	(Argentina) Fabian Valentin Martinez	RTD	8 (10)	2007-01-15	Ce.De.M. N° 1, Caseros, Buenos Aires, Argentina	
Win	17–2	(Argentina) Sergio Daniel Ledesma	KO	2 (12)	2006-08-05	Super Domo Orfeo, Cordoba, Cordoba, Argentina	
Win	16–2	(Argentina) Miguel Angel Albarado	KO	2 (8)	2005-12-09	Club General Paz Juniors, Cordoba, Cordoba, Argentina	
Win	15–2	(Argentina) Vicente Luis Burgo	TKO	2 (10)	2005-10-21	Club General Paz Juniors, Cordoba, Cordoba, Argentina	
