= Hely Yánes =

Venezuelan boxer (born 1967)

Personal information
- Born: May 25, 1967 (age 59)

Sport
- Sport: Boxing
Medal record
Representing Venezuela
Central American and Caribbean Games
Gold medal – first place	1998 Maracaibo	Light middleweight

Hely Yánes (born May 25, 1967) is a male light-middleweight boxer from Venezuela, who represented his native country at the 2000 Summer Olympics in Sydney, Australia. There he was defeated in the second round of the men's light-middleweight division (– 71 kg) by Kazakhstan's eventual gold medalist Yermakhan Ibraimov. Yánes also competed at the 1999 Pan American Games in Winnipeg, Manitoba, Canada, where he lost in the quarterfinals to Cuba's eventual gold medalist Jorge Gutiérrez.
