= Kamil Djamaloudinov =

Russian boxer (born 1979)

Personal information
- Born: 15 August 1979 (age 46)
Medal record
Men's Boxing
Representing Russia
Olympic Games
Bronze medal – third place	2000 Sydney	Featherweight
World Amateur Championships
Silver medal – second place	1999 Houston	Bantamweight

Kamil Djamaloudinov (born August 15, 1979 in Dagestan) is a boxer from Russia, who won the bronze medal in the featherweight division (– 57 kg) at the 2000 Summer Olympics in Sydney, Australia. In the semifinals he was defeated by eventual runner-up Ricardo Juarez from the United States. He captured the silver medal at the 1999 World Amateur Boxing Championships in Houston, United States.

== Olympic results ==
- Defeated Vidas Bičiulaitis (Lithuania) 9-5
- Defeated Francisco Bojado (Mexico) 15-12
- Defeated Yosvani Aguilera (Cuba) 17-12
- Lost to Rocky Juarez (Mexico) 12-23
