= Jérôme Thomas =

French boxer

Personal information
- Nationality: French
- Born: Jérôme Cedric Thomas; 20 January 1979 (age 47) Saint-Quentin, Aisne, France
- Height: 5 ft 6 in (168 cm)
- Weight: Flyweight; Bantamweight

Boxing career
- Stance: Orthodox

Boxing record
- Total fights: 14
- Wins: 12
- Win by KO: 1
- Losses: 1
- Draws: 1
Medal record
Men's Boxing
Representing France
Olympic Games
Silver medal – second place	2004 Athens	Flyweight
Bronze medal – third place	2000 Sydney	Flyweight
World Amateur Championships
Gold medal – first place	2001 Belfast	Flyweight
Silver medal – second place	2003 Bangkok	Flyweight
European Amateur Championships
Bronze medal – third place	2002 Perm	Flyweight
Bronze medal – third place	2006 Plovdiv	Flyweight
EU Amateur Championships
Gold medal – first place	2003 Strasbourg	Flyweight
Silver medal – second place	2004 Madrid	Flyweight
Mediterranean Games
Bronze medal – third place	2001 Tunis	Flyweight

Jérôme Cedric Thomas (born 20 January 1979) is a French former boxer, he competed in the flyweight (– 51 kg) division as an amateur and as a bantamweight as a professional.

== Amateur boxing career ==
Thomas won the world championship at the 2001 World Amateur Boxing Championships in Belfast, Northern Ireland. He was runner-up in 2003, losing to Thailand's Somjit Jongjohor. Thomas qualified for the 2004 Summer Olympics by ending up in second place at the 2nd AIBA European 2004 Olympic Qualifying Tournament in Warsaw, Poland. In 2007, he lost early against European Champion Georgy Balakshin.

=== Olympic career ===
He represented his native country at three consecutive Summer Olympics (2000-2008), winning a bronze (2000), and a silver medal (2004). At the 2008 Summer Olympics he lost in the first round.

== Personal life ==
He was born with a condition, Poland syndrome: his left hand is smaller than the right one, his left arm is shorter than the right one, and he has almost no left pectoral muscle.

== Olympic results ==
No.	Result	Record	Opponent	Type	Round, time	Date	Location	Notes
10	Loss	7–3–0	(Dominican Republic) Juan Carlos Payano	PUN	4 (4)	12-08-2008	Workers Indoor Arena, Beijing, China	Round of 32
9	Loss	7–2–0	(Cuba) Yuriorkis Gamboa	PUN	4 (4)	28-08-2004	Peristeri Olympic Boxing Hall, Peristeri, Athens, Greece	Finals
8	Win	7–1–0	(Azerbaijan) Fuad Aslanov	PUN	4 (4)	27-08-2004	Peristeri Olympic Boxing Hall, Peristeri, Athens, Greece	Semifinals
7	Win	6–1–0	(Uzbekistan) Tulashboy Doniyorov	PUN	4 (4)	25-08-2004	Peristeri Olympic Boxing Hall, Peristeri, Athens, Greece	Quarterfinals
6	Win	5–1–0	(Dominican Republic) Juan Carlos Payano	PUN	4 (4)	21-08-2004	Peristeri Olympic Boxing Hall, Peristeri, Athens, Greece	Round of 16
5	Win	4–1–0	(India) Akhil Kumar	PUN	4 (4)	17-08-2004	Peristeri Olympic Boxing Hall, Peristeri, Athens, Greece	Round of 32
4	Loss	3–1–0	(Kazakhstan) Bulat Jumadilov	PUN	4 (4)	29-09-2000	Sydney Convention and Exhibition Centre, Sydney, New South Wales, Australia	Semifinals
3	Win	3–0–0	(United States) José Navarro	PUN	4 (4)	27-09-2000	Sydney Convention and Exhibition Centre, Sydney, New South Wales, Australia	Quarterfinals
2	Win	2–0–0	(Burkina Faso) Drissa Tou	RSC	(4)	24-09-2000	Sydney Convention and Exhibition Centre, Sydney, New South Wales, Australia	Round of 16
1	Win	1–0–0	(Australia) Erle Wiltshire	PUN	4 (4)	19-09-2000	Sydney Convention and Exhibition Centre, Sydney, New South Wales, Australia	Round of 32

== Professional boxing record ==
14 fights	12 wins	1 loss
By knockout	0	1
By decision	12	0
By disqualification	0	0
Draws	1	
No contests	0	

No.	Result	Record	Opponent	Type	Round, time	Date	Location	Notes
14	Loss	12–1–1	(France) Hassan Azaouagh	KO	3 (12), 2:00	28-01-2012	Hotel Atlantic Palace, Agadir	
13	Win	12–0–1	(Slovakia) Elemir Rafael	PTS	6 (6)	05-11-2011	Palais des Sports, Saint-Quentin, Aisne, France	
12	Win	11–0–1	(France) Yoann Boyeaux	SD	10 (10)	03-12-2011	Palais des Sports, Saint-Quentin, Aisne, France	
11	Win	10–0–1	(Brazil) Reginaldo Martins Carvalho	PTS	6 (6)	02-11-2011	Palais des Sports, Saint-Quentin, Aisne, France	
10	Draw	9–0–1	(Spain) Joaquin Cespedes	Draw	12 (12)	03-12-2010	Palais des Sports, Saint-Quentin, Aisne, France	For vacant European Union super bantamweight title
9	Win	9–0–0	(Switzerland) Bertrand Bossel	UD	12 (12)	16-04-2010	Palais des Sports, Saint-Quentin, Aisne, France	Won vacant WBC Mediterranean super bantamweight title
8	Win	8–0–0	(France) Hassan Azaouagh	PTS	8 (8)	30-01-2010	Palais des Sports, Saint-Quentin, Aisne, France	
7	Win	7–0–0	(Nicaragua) Henry Lipton	PTS	6 (6)	15-10-2009	Cirque d'Hiver, Paris, France	
6	Win	6–0–0	(France) Alix Djavoiev	PTS	6 (6)	25-09-2009	Palais des Sports, Saint-Quentin, Aisne, France	
5	Win	5–0–0	(France) David Cagna Ginouves	UD	6 (6)	19-06-2009	Centre Omnisports, Massy, Essonne, France	
4	Win	4–0–0	(Spain) Lahcene Zemmouri	UD	6 (6)	15-05-2009	Palais des Sports, Saint-Quentin, Aisne, France	
3	Win	3–0–0	(France) Alix Djavoiev	UD	6 (6)	04-04-2009	Salle Renaux, Rosny-sur-Seine, France	
2	Win	2–0–0	(France) Youcef Abgour	UD	6 (6)	14-02-2009	Palais des Sports, Saint-Quentin, Aisne, France	
1	Win	1–0–0	(Slovakia) Elemir Rafael	UD	6 (6)	20-11-2008	Palais des Sports, Saint-Quentin, Aisne, France	
