= Ciro Di Corcia =

Italian boxer (born 1976)

Personal information
- Nationality: Italian
- Born: 4 July 1976 (age 49); Foggia, Italy

Sport
- Sport: Boxing

Ciro Di Corcia (born 4 July 1976) is an Italian boxer. He competed in the men's light middleweight event at the 2000 Summer Olympics.
