= Vidas Bičiulaitis =

Lithuanian boxer (born 1971)

Vidas Bičiulaitis (born August 11, 1971) is a retired boxer from Lithuania. He represented his native country at the 2000 Summer Olympics in Sydney, where he lost in the second round of the men's featherweight division (– 57 kg) to Russia's eventual bronze medalist Kamil Djamaloudinov.
