= Tahar Tamsamani =

Moroccan boxer (born 1980)

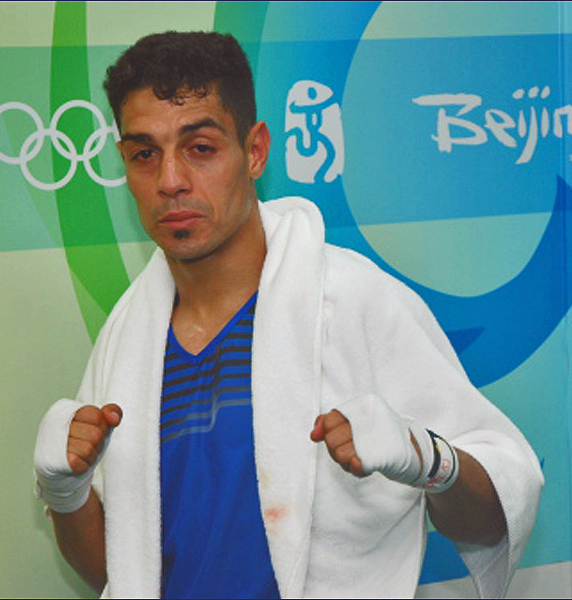
- Tamsamani at the 2008 Olympics

Personal information
- Born: 10 September 1980 (age 45) Marrakesh, Morocco
- Height: 175 cm (5 ft 9 in)

Sport
- Sport: Boxing
- Club: FRMB
Medal record
Representing Morocco
Olympic Games
Bronze medal – third place	2000 Sydney	-57 kg
African Amateur Championships
Gold medal – first place	2003 Yaoundé	-60 kg

Tahar Tamsamani (born 10 September 1980) is a retired Moroccan boxer. He competed at the 2000, 2004 and 2008 Olympics and won a bronze medal in 2000.

In 2000 he won a bronze medal in the featherweight (57 kg) division, after falling in the semifinals to Kazakhstan's Bekzat Sattarkhanov.

At the 2004 Summer Olympics he was defeated in the first bout of the lightweight (60 kg) division by Uganda's Sam Rukundo. He qualified for the Athens Games by winning the gold medal at the 1st AIBA African 2004 Olympic Qualifying Tournament in Casablanca, Morocco. In the final of the event he defeated Tunisia's Taoufik Chouba.

At the 2008 Olympic qualifier he lost to Hamza Kramou but won the third-place bout and therefore qualified for his third Olympics. In Beijing he lost to Domenico Valentino in the first bout.
