= Andrey Mishin =

Russian boxer

Personal information
- Full name: Andrey Mikhaylovich Mishin
- Born: May 28, 1979 (age 47) Irkutsk, Russia

Sport
- Weight class: Light middleweight
Medal record
Men's Boxing
Representing Russia
European Amateur Championships
Gold medal – first place	2002 Perm	Light Middleweight
Silver medal – second place	2000 Tampere	Light Middleweight
Gold medal – first place	1988 New York	Light Middleweight

Andrey Mishin (Russian: Андрей Мишин; born 28 May 1979, Novochunka, Chunsky District, Irkutsk Oblast) is a Russian former amateur boxer and boxing coach. He is a European Champion (2002), European silver medalist (2000), and winner of the 1998 Goodwill Games. He holds the title Honored Master of Sports of Russia.

== Early life and training ==
Mishin was born on 28 May 1979 in the settlement of Novochunka, Irkutsk Oblast. He began boxing in a local sports club under the guidance of Honored Coach Minizait Gusmanovich Zainulin. Later he trained under Anatoly Georgievich Katasov and represented the Dynamo sports society in competitions.

== Amateur career ==
Mishin achieved his first major success in 1997, winning the Youth European Championships in the middleweight division, which earned him a place on the national team.

In 1998, at the Goodwill Games in New York, he was the only one among 24 Russian participants to win a gold medal. For this achievement, he was awarded the honorary title Honored Master of Sports of Russia.

At the 2000 European Championships in Tampere, he won a silver medal, losing in the final to the renowned German boxer Felix Sturm. His successful performances secured him a place at the 2000 Summer Olympics in Sydney, where he hoped to contend for gold. However, in his opening bout he unexpectedly lost 11:16 to French boxer Frédéric Esther.

At the 2001 World Championships in Belfast he failed to reach the podium, but at the 2002 European Championships in Perm he convincingly defeated all of his opponents and won the gold medal.

For a time he trained in Chekhov under prominent Russian coach Valery Belov and represented the boxing club Vityaz.

After the 2003 reorganization of weight classes (67 and 71 kg combined into 69 kg), Mishin struggled to secure a place on the national team due to competition from Olympic champion Oleg Saitov. One of his last tournaments was the World Championships in Bangkok, where he did not win a medal. Following this, Mishin decided to retire from competitive boxing.

== Coaching career ==
After his retirement, Mishin began working as a boxing coach. He currently coaches at the Center of Physical Culture at Irkutsk State Technical University.

== Political activity ==
Mishin is a member of the Russian Ecological Party “The Greens.”
