= Arlan Lerio =

Filipino boxer

Personal information
- Nationality: Filipino
- Born: November 22, 1976 (age 49) Philippines
- Height: 5 ft 4 in (162 cm)
- Weight: 112 lb (51 kg)

Boxing career
- Weight class: Flyweight
Medal record
Men's boxing
Representing the Philippines
SEA Games
Silver medal – second place	1999 Bandar Seri Begawan	Flyweight
Silver medal – second place	2001 Negeri Sembilan	Bantamweight

Arlan Lerio (born November 22, 1976) is a Filipino boxer. He competed in the men's flyweight event at the 2000 Summer Olympics.

He was part of the national training pool of the Amateur Boxing Association of the Philippines as early as 1997 and won gold medals in international tournaments in England, Estonia, and Finland. Following his achievement of winning a gold medal in the Liverpool International Festival of Amateur Boxing in 1991, he was taken in as part of a boxing team by then-North Cotabato Governor Manny Piñol where his father Danilo Lerio Sr. served as coach of the team.

In 2001, he reportedly had plans on turning pro with then North Cotabato Governor Piñol as his manager.

Lerio has an younger brother named Danilo who also competed in the 2000 Summer Olympics.
