= Rocky Juarez =

American boxer (born 1980)

Personal information
- Nickname: Rocky
- Nationality: American
- Born: Ricardo Juárez; April 15, 1980 (age 46) Houston, Texas, U.S.
- Height: 5 ft 5 in (165 cm)
- Weight: Featherweight; Super featherweight

Boxing career
- Reach: 69 in (175 cm)
- Stance: Orthodox

Boxing record
- Total fights: 42
- Wins: 30
- Win by KO: 21
- Losses: 11
- Draws: 1
Medal record
Representing United States
Men's amateur boxing
Olympic Games
| Silver medal – second place | 2000 Sydney | Featherweight |
World Amateur Championships
| Gold medal – first place | 1999 Houston | Featherweight |

Ricardo Juárez (born April 15, 1980) is an American former professional boxer. He is a former WBC Silver featherweight champion and a multiple-time world title challenger. Juarez was known over his career for his aggressive fighting style and incredible durability.

== Amateur career ==
Juarez had a lustrous amateur career with a 145–17 record, which included a 68 fight winning streak, a Featherweight Olympic silver medal and a Junior Olympic World and National gold medal. In 1999 he won the world title at the 1999 World Amateur Boxing Championships in his home town. During the 2000 Olympics Gold medal round, Juarez loss controversially against Bekzat Sattarkhanov who was warned several times for holding and not penalized. It should be also noted that by the end of the second round Juarez was losing 11 points and had only 4 points to lose the match by RSC. Juarez accepted the silver medal.

- 1998 United States Amateur Featherweight champion. Results were:
  - Undepited Daniel Chavez points
  - Defeated Darling Jimenez points
  - Defeated Aaron Torres points
  - Defeated Hong Gu points
- 1999 United States Amateur Featherweight champion. Results were:
  - Defeated Jose Santa Cruz points
  - Defeated Francisco Valentin TKO 3
  - Defeated Ray Martinez points
  - Defeated Aaron Torres points
  - Defeated Steve Luevano points
- 2000 United States Amateur Featherweight champion
- Member of the 2000 U.S. Olympic team as a Featherweight, winning a silver medal. Results were:
  - Defeated Bijan Batmani (Iran) RSC-3
  - Defeated Falk Huste (Germany) points
  - Defeated Somluck Kamsing (Thailand) RSC-4
  - Defeated Kamil Dzamalutdinov (Russia) points
  - Lost to Bekzat Sattarkhanov (Kazakhstan) points

== Professional career ==
Juarez turned pro on January 25, 2001, with a unanimous decision against Pascali Adorno. A highly touted prospect, Juarez rose up the ranks with wins against Hector Velazquez, and Joe Morales. Juarez's 10th-round knockout of Antonio Diaz was named Ring Magazine Knockout of the Year for 2003. His first challenge came from 1996 Olympian Zahir Raheem on July 17, 2004, in which he won by controversial decision, possibly due to the fight taking place at Juarez's hometown in Houston, Texas. Juarez's first career loss came to Humberto Soto, who was a late sub replacement to In Jin Chi. Soto won the Interim version of the WBC featherweight title. Juarez bounced back with back-to-back wins against Reynaldo Hurtado and Backlin Medrano and earned a shot against Mexican legend, Marco Antonio Barrera for his WBC Super featherweight title.

Juarez fought Barrera on May 20, 2006, in the Staples Center in Los Angeles, California. Barrera used his jab to win the early rounds, but it was obvious from the start that Juarez wasn't backing down hurting Barrera's nose in the process. During the second half of the fight Juarez took control by rocking Barrera and making him spit out his mouthpiece several times. In a very close fight, the bout was announced originally as a draw, but later it was revealed that two of the judges scorecards had an error, as Barrera was granted the win by split decision. Despite losing, Juarez gained notoriety by standing toe to toe with one of the best pound-for-pound boxers in the world. Although not required by contract, Barrera and Juarez met in a rematch on September 16, this time Barrera winning comfortably on points through a unanimous decision (117-111, 115–113, 115–113).

As a replacement for Jorge Rodrigo Barrios, Rocky Juarez stepped in and fought Juan Manuel Márquez for the WBC Super Featherweight title on November 3, 2007. He lost to Marquez on a unanimous decision. Juarez fought most of the fight with a bad cut above his left eye due to an accidental headbutt in the first round.

On September 6, 2008, Rocky Juarez, (27-4, 19 KO's) won by TKO at 2:55 in the 11th round of the 12-rounder over former WBO Junior Lightweight Champion Jorge Rodrigo Barrios, (47-3-1, 34 KO's).

In his fourth attempt at a title, Juarez fought Chris John to a controversial draw on February 28, 2009, in his hometown of Houston. Most ringside observers thought John won. The two were supposed to fight a rematch on June 27 of that year but John withdrew from the fight due to problems with his blood tests. The rematch finally took place on September 19 and the fight was won by John.

Rocky Juarez fought Jason Litzau on April 3, 2010, losing by a controversial technical decision when the fight was halted in the seventh round due to a cut on Litzau's cheek which referee Jay Nady ruled was caused by an accidental head butt. The judges scored it 68-65 and 67-66 twice, in favour of the winner, Jason Litzau.

== Professional boxing record ==
| 42 fights | 30 wins | 11 losses |
|---|---|---|
| By knockout | 21 | 0 |
| By decision | 9 | 11 |
| Draws | 1 | |

| No. | Result | Record | Opponent | Type | Round, time | Date | Location | Notes |
|---|---|---|---|---|---|---|---|---|
| 42 | Loss | 30–11–1 | Robinson Castellanos | UD | 12 | 26 Jan 2015 | Cowboys Dance Hall, San Antonio, Texas, U.S. | Lost WBC Silver featherweight title |
| 41 | Win | 30–10–1 | René Alvarado | UD | 12 | 26 May 2014 | Fort Bliss Arena, El Paso, Texas, U.S. | Won WBC Silver featherweight title |
| 40 | Win | 29–10–1 | Antonio Escalante | TKO | 8 (10), 1:29 | 27 Oct 2012 | Freeman Coliseum, San Antonio, Texas, U.S. | |
| 39 | Loss | 28–10–1 | Andrew Cancio | UD | 10 | 2 Jun 2012 | Fantasy Springs Resort Casino, Indio, California, U.S. | |
| 38 | Loss | 28–9–1 | Vicente Escobedo | UD | 10 | 23 Sep 2011 | Fantasy Springs Resort Casino, Indio, California, U.S. | |
| 37 | Loss | 28–8–1 | Alejandro Sanabria | UD | 12 | 19 Feb 2011 | Auditorio Ernesto Rufo, Rosarito, Mexico | For vacant WBC Continental Americas super featherweight title |
| 36 | Loss | 28–7–1 | Jorge Linares | UD | 12 | 31 Jul 2010 | Mandalay Bay Events Center, Paradise, Nevada, U.S. | For WBA Fedelatin interim lightweight title |
| 35 | Loss | 28–6–1 | Jason Litzau | TD | 7 (10), 3:00 | 3 Apr 2010 | Mandalay Bay Events Center, Paradise, Nevada, U.S. | For NABF super featherweight title; Unanimous TD: Litzau cut from accidental head clash |
| 34 | Loss | 28–5–1 | Chris John | UD | 12 | 19 Sep 2009 | MGM Grand Garden Arena, Paradise, Nevada, U.S. | For WBA (Super) featherweight title |
| 33 | Draw | 28–4–1 | Chris John | UD | 12 | 28 Feb 2009 | Toyota Center, Houston, Texas, U.S. | For WBA featherweight title |
| 32 | Win | 28–4 | Jorge Barrios | TKO | 11 (12), 2:55 | 6 Sep 2008 | Toyota Center, Houston, Texas, U.S. | Won vacant WBO Latino super featherweight title |
| 31 | Loss | 27–4 | Juan Manuel Marquez | UD | 12 | 3 Nov 2007 | Desert Diamond Casino, Tucson, Arizona, U.S. | For WBC super featherweight title |
| 30 | Win | 27–3 | José Hernández | UD | 12 | 5 May 2007 | MGM Grand Garden Arena, Paradise, Nevada, U.S. | Won vacant WBA Fedelatin super featherweight title |
| 29 | Win | 26–3 | Emmanuel Lucero | TKO | 5 (10), 1:05 | 9 Feb 2007 | Desert Diamond Casino, Tucson, Arizona, U.S. | |
| 28 | Loss | 25–3 | Marco Antonio Barrera | UD | 12 | 16 Sep 2006 | MGM Grand Garden Arena, Paradise, Nevada, U.S. | For WBC super featherweight title |
| 27 | Loss | 25–2 | Marco Antonio Barrera | SD | 12 | 20 May 2006 | Staples Center, Los Angeles, California, U.S. | For WBC super featherweight title |
| 26 | Win | 25–1 | Backlin Medrano | TKO | 4 (10), 3:00 | 21 Jan 2006 | Coushatta Casino Resort, Kinder, Louisiana, U.S. | |
| 25 | Win | 24–1 | Reynaldo Hurtado | TKO | 3 (10), 1:13 | 9 Dec 2005 | American Bank Center, Corpus Christi, Texas, U.S. | |
| 24 | Loss | 23–1 | Humberto Soto | UD | 12 | 20 Aug 2005 | Allstate Arena, Rosemont, Illinois, U.S. | For WBC interim featherweight title |
| 23 | Win | 23–0 | Juan Carlos Ramírez | TKO | 1 (10), 2:59 | 4 Mar 2005 | Pechanga Resort & Casino, Temecula, California, U.S. | |
| 22 | Win | 22–0 | Guty Espadas Jr. | KO | 2 (12), 2:24 | 3 Dec 2004 | Bally's, Atlantic City, New Jersey, U.S. | Retained WBC Continental Americas featherweight title |
| 21 | Win | 21–0 | Zahir Raheem | UD | 12 | 17 Jul 2004 | Reliant Arena, Houston, Texas, U.S. | Retained WBC Continental Americas featherweight title |
| 20 | Win | 20–0 | Joe Morales | UD | 10 | 24 Apr 2004 | Reliant Park, Houston, Texas, U.S. | |
| 19 | Win | 19–0 | Héctor Velázquez | UD | 12 | 22 Nov 2003 | Reliant Park, Houston, Texas, U.S. | Won vacant WBC Continental Americas featherweight title |
| 18 | Win | 18–0 | David Murillo | KO | 1 (10), 0:26 | 13 Sep 2003 | Pechanga Resort & Casino, Temecula, California, U.S. | |
| 17 | Win | 17–0 | Antonio Díaz | KO | 10 (10), 1:33 | 19 Jul 2003 | Reliant Park, Houston, Texas, U.S. | |
| 16 | Win | 16–0 | Frankie Archuleta | TKO | 6 (10), 2:39 | 3 May 2003 | Flamingo Las Vegas, Paradise, Nevada, U.S. | |
| 15 | Win | 15–0 | Jason Pires | TKO | 9 (10), 0:16 | 1 Feb 2003 | Mohegan Sun, Montville, Connecticut, U.S. | |
| 14 | Win | 14–0 | Natalio Ponce | TKO | 9 (10), 1:15 | 6 Dec 2002 | Riverside Convention Center, Victoria, Texas, U.S. | |
| 13 | Win | 13–0 | Hector Acero Sánchez | UD | 10 | 19 Oct 2002 | Reliant Park, Houston, Texas, U.S. | |
| 12 | Win | 12–0 | Ivan Alvarez | TKO | 6 (8), 2:48 | 30 Aug 2002 | Park Performing Arts Center, Union City, New Jersey, U.S. | |
| 11 | Win | 11–0 | Isidro Tejedor | TKO | 2 (8), 2:01 | 13 Jul 2002 | Sam's Town Hotel and Gambling Hall, Tunica, Mississippi, U.S. | |
| 10 | Win | 10–0 | Len Martinez | TKO | 1 (6), 2:38 | 25 May 2002 | Lowes Speedway, Charlotte, North Carolina, U.S. | |
| 9 | Win | 9–0 | Javier Ortiz | KO | 5 (8), 2:01 | 27 Apr 2002 | Mohegan Sun, Montville, Connecticut, U.S. | |
| 8 | Win | 8–0 | Jorge Garcia | UD | 6 | 15 Feb 2002 | Radisson Hotel, Houston, Texas, U.S. | |
| 7 | Win | 7–0 | Frankie Martinez | TKO | 4 (6), 1:11 | 5 Jan 2002 | Freeman Coliseum, San Antonio, Texas, U.S. | |
| 6 | Win | 6–0 | Corey Alarcon | TKO | 2 (6), 1:57 | 10 Nov 2011 | Reliant Arena, Houston, Texas, U.S. | |
| 5 | Win | 5–0 | Juan Rafael Gutierrez | UD | 6 | 1 Sep 2001 | Don Haskins Center, El Paso, Texas, U.S. | |
| 4 | Win | 4–0 | Fabian Espinosa | TKO | 3 (4), 2:33 | 20 Jul 2001 | Memorial Civic Center, Canton, Ohio, U.S. | |
| 3 | Win | 3–0 | Edward Utorov | TKO | 4 (4), 0:38 | 19 May 2001 | Mohegan Sun, Montville, Connecticut, U.S. | |
| 2 | Win | 2–0 | Mike Jones | KO | 1 (4), 0:44 | 2 Mar 2001 | Texas Station, North Las Vegas, Nevada, U.S. | |
| 1 | Win | 1–0 | Pascali Adorno | UD | 4 | 13 Jan 2001 | Mohegan Sun, Montville, Connecticut, U.S. | |

Awards
| Previous: Lennox Lewis KO8 Mike Tyson | The Ring Magazine Knockout of the Year; KO10 Antonio Diaz; 2003 | Next: Antonio Tarver KO 2 Roy Jones Jr. |
