= Ovidiu Bobîrnat =

Cypriot boxer (born 1978)

Personal information
- Nationality: Romanian, Cypriot
- Born: 4 May 1978 (age 47); Iași, Romania

Sport
- Sport: Boxing

Ovidio Bobîrnat (born 4 May 1978) is a Romanian and Cypriot boxer. He competed in the men's featherweight event at the 2000 Summer Olympics. Representing Cyprus, he won a silver medal in the 2005 Mediterranean Games in the featherweight category.
