= Wijan Ponlid =

Thai boxer

Wijan Ponlid TCh, TM, ChBh, RChM
Personal information
- Full name: วิจารณ์ พลฤทธิ์
- Nicknames: "Thai Pea" "Ikkyū-san"
- Nationality: Thailand
- Born: April 26, 1976 (age 50) Si Satchanalai, Sukhothai
- Height: 1.62 m (5 ft 4 in)
- Weight: 51 kg (112 lb)

Sport
- Sport: Boxing
- Weight class: Flyweight
- Club: Thai Police
Medal record
Olympic Games
| Gold medal – first place | 2000 Sydney | Flyweight |
SEA Games
| Gold medal – first place | 1999 Sea Games | Flyweight |

Police Lieutenant colonel Wijan Ponlid (Thai: วิจารณ์ พลฤทธิ์; RTGS: Wichan Phonrit; born April 26, 1976) is a Thai boxer who competed in the Men's Flyweight (– 51 kg) division at the 2000 Summer Olympics and won the gold medal. He returned to Thailand to a hero's welcome: honored with a new house, over 20 million baht, a job promotion (as a police officer in Sukhothai), and paraded at the head of a procession of 49 elephants through the city of Bangkok. He has the nickname "Thai Pea", in reference to another great southpaw defensive boxing master, Pernell "Sweet Pea" Whitaker.

== Biography ==
In Muay thai, Wijan fought under the names Srisatchanalai TaxiMeter (Thai: ศรีสัชนาลัย แท็กซี่มิเตอร์) and Srisatchanalai Sasiprapagym (Thai: ศรีสัชนาลัย ศศิประภายิม). He captured the Rajadamnern Stadium Super Flyweight title in 1997. He trained alongside his brother Sukhothai TaxiMeter who also was a Rajadamnern Stadium champion.

During the 2000 Olympics Ponlid defeated Vardan Zakaryan of Germany in round 1, Andrew Kooner of Canada in round 2, upset Cuban Manuel Mantilla in the quarterfinal, beat Vladimir Sidorenko of Ukraine in the semifinal, and finally met Atlanta silver medalist Bulat Jumadilov of Kazakhstan in the final. The Thai led after every round of the bout, despite Jumadilov taking the second 6–5 to pull back to 9–7 behind, and caused endless problems for the Kazakh with his probing right lead and quick left.

In a messy fight, both men fell to the canvas twice in the third round as they pushed and clinched, but Ponlid led 15–11 at the bell and then made sure of gold by dominating the fourth.

He is the second Thai athlete to win an Olympic gold medal, following fellow boxer Somluck Kamsing’s euphoric victory at Atlanta in 1996.

In victory Ponlid held aloft a framed photo of King Bhumibol in the ring with the red, white and blue flag of Thailand draped around his shoulders.

== After boxing ==
Life after boxing, he served as a police officer in his hometown of Sukhothai. Ponlid was also the head coach of the women's national boxing team competing at the 2024 Summer Olympics. After that tournament, where Janjaem Suwannapheng claimed a bronze medal in the welterweight (– 66 kg) division, he was appointed head coach of Thailand's national amateur boxing team for both men and women, with the ultimate goal of winning gold at the 2028 Summer Olympics in Los Angeles, until he was replaced in late August 2025 by Cuban coach Luis Mariano González Cosme.

== Olympic results ==
- Defeated Vardan Zakaryan (Germany) RSC 4
- Defeated Andrew Kooner (Canada) 11–7
- Defeated Manuel Mantilla (Cuba) 19–8
- Defeated Wladimir Sidorenko (Ukraine) 14–11
- Defeated Bulat Zhumadilov (Kazakhstan) 19–12

== Titles and accomplishments ==
=== Muay Thai ===
- Rajadamnern Stadium
  - 1997 Rajadamnern Stadium Super Flyweight (115 lbs) Champion

== Muay Thai record ==
Muay Thai record
| Date | Result | Opponent | Event | Location | Method | Round | Time |
|---|---|---|---|---|---|---|---|
| 1999-03- | Win | (Thailand) Sansananchai Kiatprasarnchai | Rangsit Stadium | Pathum Thani, Thailand | Decision | 5 | 3:00 |
Wins the vacant Rangsit Stadium 118 lbs title.
| 1999-01-21 | Draw | (Thailand) Sansananchai Kiatprasarnchai | Rangsit Stadium | Pathum Thani, Thailand | Decision | 5 | 3:00 |
| 1998-12- | Loss | (Thailand) Kasemlek Kiatsiri | Rangsit Stadium | Pathum Thani, Thailand | Decision | 5 | 3:00 |
| 1998-11-18 | Loss | (Thailand) Yodthanu Daopaetriew | Rangsit Stadium | Pathum Thani, Thailand | Decision | 5 | 3:00 |
For the Rangsit Stadium 115 lbs title.
| 1998-10-15 | Win | (Thailand) Sornram Sitsiayam | Rangsit Stadium | Pathum Thani, Thailand | Decision | 5 | 3:00 |
| 1998-07-13 | Loss | (Thailand) Saenchai Sor.Kingstar | Lumpinee Stadium | Bangkok, Thailand | Decision | 5 | 3:00 |
| 1997-12-08 | Win | (Thailand) Yodthanu Daopaetriew | Rajadamnern Stadium | Bangkok, Thailand | Decision | 5 | 3:00 |
Wins Rajadamnern Stadium 115 lbs title.
| 1997-10-09 | Loss | (Thailand) Palangphet Por.Srithong | Lumpinee Stadium | Bangkok, Thailand | Decision | 5 | 3:00 |
| 1997-03-12 | Loss | (Thailand) Sansananchai Kiatprasarnchai | Rajadamnern Stadium | Bangkok, Thailand | Decision | 5 | 3:00 |
| 1996-10-21 | Loss | (Thailand) Palangphet Por.Srithong | Rajadamnern Stadium | Bangkok, Thailand | Decision | 5 | 3:00 |
| 1996-07-22 | Loss | (Thailand) Yodthanu Daopaetriew | Aswindam, Rajadamnern Stadium | Bangkok, Thailand | Decision | 5 | 3:00 |
For the Rajadamnern Stadium 115 lbs title.
| 1996-04-04 | Win | (Thailand) Chartchainoi Chaorai-Oi | Rajadamnern Stadium | Bangkok, Thailand | Decision | 5 | 3:00 |
| 1995-09-13 | Loss | (Thailand) Jaipetch Chor.Chutirat | Rajadamnern Stadium | Bangkok, Thailand | Decision | 5 | 3:00 |
| 1995-08-17 | Win | (Thailand) Saenthanong Lukbanyai | Rajadamnern Stadium | Bangkok, Thailand | Decision | 5 | 3:00 |
| 1995-03-09 | Win | (Thailand) Khaopong Pinsinchai | Rajadamnern Stadium | Bangkok, Thailand | Decision | 5 | 3:00 |
| 1994-10-13 | Win | (Thailand) Petchwangchan Lukchaophophrakan | Rajadamnern Stadium | Bangkok, Thailand | Decision | 5 | 3:00 |
| 1994-02-16 | Win | (Thailand) Inseenoi Sereefarm | Rajadamnern Stadium | Bangkok, Thailand | Decision | 5 | 3:00 |
| 1993-04-22 | Win | (Thailand) Surat Kiatkamthorn | Rajadamnern Stadium | Bangkok, Thailand | Decision | 5 | 3:00 |
Legend: Win Loss Draw/No contest Notes
