= José Luis Zertuche =

Mexican boxer (born 1973)

Personal information
- Nickname: El Elotero
- Born: José Luis Zertuche Chávez; 7 May 1973 (age 53) León, Guanajuato, Mexico
- Height: 1.80 m (5 ft 11 in)
- Weight: Middleweight; Light middleweight

Boxing career
- Reach: 183 cm (72 in)
- Stance: Orthodox

Boxing record
- Total fights: 32
- Wins: 21
- Win by KO: 16
- Losses: 8
- Draws: 3
- No contests: 0

José Luis Zertuche Chávez (born 7 May 1973) is a Mexican former professional boxer who competed from 2001 to 2011. He was a former IBA Middleweight Champion. As an amateur, he competed at the 2000 Summer Olympics.

== Amateur career ==
Zertuche had an amateur record of 48-9 and was a two time Light Middleweight Mexican National boxing champion. He was also a member of the 2000 Mexican Olympic team, José would go on to beat Sidy Sandy of Guinea in the first round.

== Professional career ==
In the pros he has a victory over the 2006 winner of the ESPN reality show, The Contender Grady Brewer and some tough losses to both Marcos Reyes and Kelly Pavlik.
