= Fırat Karagöllü =

Turkish boxer

Personal information
- Nationality: Turkish
- Born: 7 February 1978 (age 47)

Sport
- Sport: Boxing

Fırat Karagöllü (born 7 February 1978) is a Turkish boxer. He competed in the men's light middleweight event at the 2000 Summer Olympics.
