= Pornchai Thongburan =

Thai boxer

Pornchai Thongburan ChCh, ChM, ChBh, RChM
Personal information
- Full name: พรชัย ทองบุราณ
- Nationality: Thailand
- Born: July 1, 1974 (age 52) Kut Khaopun; Ubon Ratchathani
- Height: 1.73 m (5 ft 8 in)
- Weight: 71 kg (157 lb)

Sport
- Sport: Boxing
- Weight class: Light Middleweight
Medal record
Olympic Games
Bronze medal – third place	2000 Sydney	Light Middleweight
Asian Games
Bronze medal – third place	1994 Hiroshima	Light Welterweight

Pornchai Thongburan (Thai: พรชัย ทองบุราณ; RTGS: Phonchai Thongburan; born July 1, 1974) is a boxer from Thailand who competed in the Light Middleweight (– 71 kg) at the 2000 Summer Olympics and won the bronze medal.

== Olympic results ==
- 1st round bye
- Defeated Karoly Balzsay (Hungary) 17–12
- Defeated Mohamed Hekal (Egypt) 15–9
- Lost to Marian Simion (Romania) 16-26
