= Hicham Mesbahi =

Moroccan boxer (born 1980)

Personal information
- Born: December 4, 1980 (age 45) Casablanca, Morocco
Medal record
Men's boxing
Representing Morocco
African Amateur Championships
Gold medal – first place	2003 Yaoundé	Flyweight

Hicham Mesbahi (born December 4, 1980) is a boxer from Morocco who participated in three Olympics. He was born in Casablanca.

In 2000, when Sydney hosted the Summer Olympics, he was defeated in the second round. At the 2004 Summer Olympics, he was defeated in the second round of the flyweight (51 kg) division by Poland's Andrzej Rzany. He qualified for the Athens Games by winning the gold medal at the 1st AIBA African 2004 Olympic Qualifying Tournament in Casablanca, Morocco. In the final of the event he defeated Algeria's Mebarek Soltani.

For the 2008 Summer Olympics Mesbahi qualified at bantamweight, beating among others Issa Samir even though he lost the final of the qualifier to Abdelhalim Ouradi.
