= Vardan Zakaryan =

German boxer

Vardan Zakaryan is a German amateur boxer of Armenian descent who competed at the 2000 Summer Olympics at Flyweight. Zakaryan was defeated in the first round by eventual Gold Medalist Wijan Ponlid of Thailand.
