= Nacer Keddam =

Algerian boxer (born 1976)

Personal information
- Nationality: Algerian
- Born: 31 October 1976 (age 48)

Sport
- Sport: Boxing

Nacer Keddam (born 31 October 1976) is an Algerian boxer. He competed in the men's flyweight event at the 2000 Summer Olympics.
