= Manuel Mantilla (boxer) =

Cuban boxer (born 1973)

Personal information
- Full name: Manuel Mantilla Rodríguez
- Nationality: Cuba
- Born: September 25, 1973 (age 52)
- Height: 1.65 m (5 ft 5 in)
- Weight: 51 kg (112 lb)

Sport
- Sport: Boxing
- Weight class: Flyweight
Medal record
World Amateur Boxing Championships
Gold medal – first place	1997 Budapest	Flyweight
Pan American Games
Bronze medal – third place	1999 Winnipeg	Flyweight
Central American and Caribbean Games
Gold medal – first place	1993 Ponce	Flyweight
Gold medal – first place	1998 Maracaibo	Flyweight
Goodwill Games
Gold medal – first place	1994 Saint Petersburg	Light Flyweight

Manuel Mantilla (born September 25, 1973) is an amateur boxer from Cuba, who represented his native country in the Men's Flyweight (– 51 kg) category at the 2000 Summer Olympics in Sydney, Australia.

There he was stopped in the quarterfinals by Thailand's eventual gold medalist Wijan Ponlid. Mantilla won several medals in the same weight division on the continental level in the 1990s.
