= Volodymyr Sydorenko =

Ukrainian boxer

Personal information
- Nationality: Ukrainian
- Born: September 23, 1976 (age 49) Enerhodar, Ukrainian SSR, Soviet Union
- Height: 1.62 m (5 ft 4 in)
- Weight: Bantamweight

Boxing career
- Stance: Orthodox

Boxing record
- Total fights: 27
- Wins: 22
- Win by KO: 7
- Losses: 3
- Draws: 2
Medal record
Representing Ukraine
Men's amateur boxing
Olympic Games
Bronze medal – third place	2000 Sydney	Flyweight
World Championships
Silver medal – second place	2001 Belfast	Flyweight
European Championships
Gold medal – first place	1998 Minsk	Flyweight
Gold medal – first place	2000 Tampere	Flyweight
Military World Games
Gold medal – first place	1995 Rome	Flyweight

Volodymyr Petrovych Sydorenko (Ukrainian: Володимир Петрович Сидоренко; born 23 September 1976), also known as Wladimir Sidorenko, is a Ukrainian former professional boxer who competed from 2001 to 2010, and held the WBA bantamweight title from 2005 to 2008. As an amateur, he won a silver medal at the 2001 World Championships, and consecutive golds at the 1998 and 2000 European Championships; all in the flyweight division. His twin brother is former amateur boxer Valeriy Sydorenko.

== Amateur career ==
Sydorenko won a bronze medal at the 2000 Summer Olympics as a flyweight:

- Defeated Daniel Ponce de León (Mexico) 16–8
- Defeated Omar Andrés Narváez (Argentina) 16–10
- Defeated Andrzej Rżany (Poland) RSC 3
- Lost to Wijan Ponlid (Thailand) 11–14
- 1998 European Championships gold medalist
- 2000 European Championships gold medalist
- 2001 World Championships silver medalist

Sydorenko claimed an amateur record of 290–20.

== Professional career ==
Sydorenko won the vacant WBA bantamweight title at expense of Julio Zarate on 26 February 2005. From there, he went on to defend that title six times.

He lost his title by unanimous decision to Anselmo Moreno in May 2008, and again in the rematch on 2 May 2009 by split decision. On 4 December 2010, he was knocked down 3 times en route to 4th-round KO loss to Nonito Donaire.

== Professional boxing record ==
27 fights	22 wins	3 losses
By knockout	7	1
By decision	15	2
Draws	2	

No.	Result	Record	Opponent	Type	Round, time	Date	Location	Notes
27	Loss	22–3–2	Nonito Donaire	KO	4 (12), 1:48	4 Dec 2010	Honda Center, Anaheim, California, US	For vacant WBC Continental Americas bantamweight title
26	Win	22–2–2	Mbwana Matumla	UD	12	28 Aug 2010	Maidan Nezalezhnosti, Kyiv, Ukraine	Won vacant WBC International super flyweight title
25	Loss	21–2–2	Anselmo Moreno	SD	12	2 May 2009	Halle 7, Bremen, Germany	For WBA bantamweight title
24	Loss	21–1–2	Anselmo Moreno	UD	12	31 May 2008	Burg-Wächter Castello, Düsseldorf, Germany	Lost WBA bantamweight title
23	Win	21–0–2	Nobuto Ikehara	UD	12	10 Jan 2008	Prefectural Gymnasium, Osaka, Japan	Retained WBA bantamweight title
22	Win	20–0–2	Jerome Arnould	KO	7 (12)	29 Jun 2007	Palais des Sports, Marseille, France	Retained WBA bantamweight title
21	Draw	19–0–2	Ricardo Cordoba	MD	12	17 Mar 2007	Hanns-Martin-Schleyer-Halle, Stuttgart, Germany	Retained WBA bantamweight title
20	Win	19–0–1	Poonsawat Kratingdaenggym	UD	12	15 Jul 2006	Color Line Arena, Hamburg, Germany	Retained WBA bantamweight title
19	Draw	18–0–1	Ricardo Cordoba	MD	12	11 Mar 2006	Color Line Arena, Hamburg, Germany	Retained WBA bantamweight title
18	Win	18–0	Jose de Jesus Lopez	UD	12	26 Nov 2005	Wilhelm Dopatka Halle, Leverkusen, Germany	Retained WBA bantamweight title
17	Win	17–0	Julio Zarate	UD	12	26 Feb 2005	Color Line Arena, Hamburg, Germany	Won vacant WBA bantamweight title
16	Win	16–0	Leo Gamez	UD	12	26 Oct 2004	Scandlines Arena, Rostock, Germany	
15	Win	15–0	Joseph Agbeko	MD	12	18 May 2004	Hansehalle, Lübeck, Germany	Retained EBA bantamweight title
14	Win	14–0	Moises Castro	UD	12	17 Feb 2004	Hansehalle, Lübeck, Germany	Won vacant EBA bantamweight title
13	Win	13–0	Sergei Tassimov	PTS	8	13 Dec 2003	Hala Okrąglak, Opole, Poland	
12	Win	12–0	Giovanni Andrade	TKO	3 (8)	18 Nov 2003	Universum Gym, Hamburg, Germany	
11	Win	11–0	Alberto Ontiveros	UD	8	23 Sep 2003	Universum Gym, Hamburg, Germany	
10	Win	10–0	Simphiwe Xabendlini	TKO	2 (6)	31 May 2003	Circus, Lviv, Ukraine	
9	Win	9–0	Emil Stoica	UD	6	26 Apr 2003	Sport- und Kongresshalle, Schwerin, Germany	
8	Win	8–0	Pál Lakatos	TKO	5 (6)	23 Mar 2003	Avendi Hotel, Bad Honnef, Germany	
7	Win	7–0	Vuyisile Nunu	TKO	2 (6)	21 Dec 2002	Lausitz-Arena, Cottbus, Germany	
6	Win	6–0	Tamas Szakallas	UD	6	12 Oct 2002	Sport- und Kongresshalle, Schwerin, Germany	
5	Win	5–0	Imrich Parlagi	KO	2 (8), 0:33	7 Sep 2002	Berlin, Germany	
4	Win	4–0	Frederic Patrac	PTS	4	6 Apr 2002	Universum Gym, Hamburg, Germany	
3	Win	3–0	Christophe Rodrigues	PTS	4	8 Feb 2002	Volkswagen Halle, Braunschweig, Germany	
2	Win	2–0	Stefan Berza	KO	2 (4)	15 Dec 2001	Estrel Hotel, Berlin, Germany	
1	Win	1–0	Vladimir Varhegyi	PTS	4	3 Nov 2001	Hansehalle, Lübeck, Germany	

== See also ==
- List of WBA world champions
- Olympic medalists in boxing
- Ukraine at the 2000 Summer Olympics

Sporting positions
Regional boxing titles
Inaugural champion	EBA bantamweight champion 17 February 2004 – October 2004; Vacated	Title discontinued
World boxing titles
Vacant Title last held by Johnny Bredahl	WBA bantamweight champion 26 February 2005 – 31 May 2008	Succeeded by Anselmo Moreno
