= Boxing at the 1998 Commonwealth Games =

Boxing competitions

- Venue: Malawati Stadium
- Location: Kuala Lumpur, Malaysia
- Dates: 11 to 21 September 1998

Boxing at the 1998 Commonwealth Games was the 16th appearance of the Boxing at the Commonwealth Games. The events were held in Kuala Lumpur, Malaysia, from 11 to 21 September 1998 and featured contests in twelve weight classes.

The boxing events were held the Malawati Stadium.

England topped the boxing medal table by virtue of winning four gold medals.

== Medal table ==
* Host nation (Malaysia)

| Rank | Nation | Gold | Silver | Bronze | Total |
|---|---|---|---|---|---|
| 1 | England | 4 | 0 | 2 | 6 |
| 2 | Canada | 3 | 3 | 2 | 8 |
| 3 | Mauritius | 1 | 1 | 1 | 3 |
| 4 | Ghana | 1 | 0 | 3 | 4 |
| 5 | Scotland | 1 | 0 | 2 | 3 |
| 6 | Malaysia* | 1 | 0 | 1 | 2 |
| 7 | Tanzania | 1 | 0 | 0 | 1 |
| 8 | Kenya | 0 | 2 | 1 | 3 |
| 9 | Seychelles | 0 | 2 | 0 | 2 |
| 10 | Northern Ireland | 0 | 1 | 1 | 2 |
| 11 | Cameroon | 0 | 1 | 0 | 1 |
| 11 | India | 0 | 1 | 0 | 1 |
| 11 | Pakistan | 0 | 1 | 0 | 1 |
| 14 | Australia | 0 | 0 | 4 | 4 |
| 15 | Cyprus | 0 | 0 | 1 | 1 |
| 15 | New Zealand | 0 | 0 | 1 | 1 |
| 15 | Papua New Guinea | 0 | 0 | 1 | 1 |
| 15 | South Africa | 0 | 0 | 1 | 1 |
| 15 | Uganda | 0 | 0 | 1 | 1 |
| 15 | Wales | 0 | 0 | 1 | 1 |
| 15 | Zambia | 0 | 0 | 1 | 1 |
| Totals (21 entries) | | 12 | 12 | 24 | 48 |

== Medallists ==
| Weight | Gold | Silver | Bronze |
|---|---|---|---|
| Light flyweight (48 kg) | Sapok Biki; Malaysia | Moses Kinyua; Kenya | Roudik Kazanijian; Cyprus; Gary Jones; England |
| Flyweight (51 kg) | Richard Sunee; Mauritius | Liam Cunningham; Northern Ireland | Phumzile Matyhila; South Africa; Jackson Asiku; Uganda |
| Bantamweight (54 kg) | Michael Yomba; Tanzania | Herman Ngoudjo; Cameroon | Adnan Yusoh; Malaysia; Andrew Kooner; Canada |
| Featherweight (57 kg) | Alex Arthur; Scotland | Marty O'Donnell; Canada | Lynch Ipera; Papua New Guinea; James Swan; Australia |
| Lightweight (60 kg) | Ray Narh; Ghana | Ali Asghar; Pakistan | Andrew McLean; England; Giovanni Frontin; Mauritius |
| Light welterweight (63.5 kg) | Michael Strange; Canada | Gerry Legras; Seychelles | Casey Johns; Australia; Davis Mwale; Zambia |
| Welterweight (67 kg) | Jeremy Molitor; Canada | Absolom Okoth; Kenya | Colin McNeil; Scotland; Lynden Hosking; Australia |
| Light middleweight (71 kg) | Chris Bessey; England | Scott MacIntosh; Canada | James Tony; Ghana; Jackie Townsley; Scotland |
| Middleweight (75 kg) | John Pearce; England | Jitender Kumar; India | Trevor Stewardson; Canada; Brian Magee; Northern Ireland |
| Light heavyweight (81 kg) | Courtney Fry; England | Troy Ross; Canada | Samuel Odindo; Kenya; Charles Adamu; Ghana |
| Heavyweight (91 kg) | Mark Simmons; Canada | Roland Raforme; Seychelles | Kevin Evans; Wales; Garth da Silva; New Zealand |
| Super heavyweight (over 91 kg) | Audley Harrison; England | Michael Macaque; Mauritius | Justin Whitehead; Australia; Moyoyo Aloryi; Ghana |

== Results ==
=== Light-flyweight 48kg ===
| Round | Winner | Loser | Score |
|---|---|---|---|
| Preliminary | (Kenya) Moses Kinyua | (Canada) Domenic Figliomeni | 10:2 |
| Quarter-Final | (Cyprus) Roudik Kazandzhyan | (Australia) David Lockett | 23:14 |
| Quarter-Final | (Kenya) Moses Kinyua | (Lesotho) Sole Mou | 40:16 |
| Quarter-Final | (England) Gary Jones | (Ghana) Joseph Agbeko | 12:7 |
| Quarter-Final | (Malaysia) Sapok Biki | (Zambia) Kennedy Kanyanta | 23:6 |
| Semi-Final | (Kenya) Moses Kinyua | (Cyprus) Roudik Kazandzhyan | 33:14 |
| Semi-Final | (Malaysia) Sapok Biki | (England) Gary Jones | 15:11 |
| Final | (Malaysia) Sapok Biki | (Kenya) Moses Kinyua | 19:13 |

=== Flyweight 51kg ===
| Round | Winner | Loser | Score |
|---|---|---|---|
| Preliminary | (Zimbabwe) Brighton Matsangura | (Tanzania) Ben Mwangata | 12:11 |
| Preliminary | (Uganda) Jackson Asiku | (Solomon Islands) Timothy Soe | RSC 3 |
| Preliminary | (Malaysia) Rahib Ahmad | (Australia) Erle Wiltshire | 15:5 |
| Preliminary | (Mauritius) Richard Sunee | (Zambia) Victor Kasote | 14:5 |
| Preliminary | (South Africa) Phumzile Matyhila | (Botswana) Elliot Mmila | 20:16 |
| Preliminary | (Ghana) Abdulaye Amidu | (Lesotho) Katiso Tsenoli | 29:13 |
| Preliminary | (England) James Hegney | (Mozambique) Antonio Helio | 18:13 |
| Preliminary | (Northern Ireland) Liam Cunningham | (Wales) Darren Hayde | 9:6 |
| Quarter-Final | (South Africa) Phumzile Matyhila | (Ghana) Abdulaye Amidu | 16:15 |
| Quarter-Final | (Northern Ireland) Liam Cunningham | (England) James Hegney | 20:12 |
| Quarter-Final | (Uganda) Jackson Asiku | (Zimbabwe) Brighton Matsangura | 19:14 |
| Quarter-Final | (Mauritius) Richard Sunee | (Malaysia) Rahib Ahmad | +14:14 |
| Semi-Final | (Mauritius) Richard Sunee | (Uganda) Jackson Asiku | 31:16 |
| Semi-Final | (Northern Ireland) Liam Cunningham | (South Africa) Phumzile Matyhila | 21:8 |
| Final | (Mauritius) Richard Sunee | (Northern Ireland) Liam Cunningham | AB 5 |

=== Bantamweight 54kg ===
| Round | Winner | Loser | Score |
|---|---|---|---|
| Quarter-Final | (Tanzania) Michael Yomba | (Zimbabwe) Clied Musonda | 27:6 |
| Quarter-Final | (Malaysia) Adnan Yusoh | (South Africa) Silence Mabuza | 16:14 |
| Quarter-Final | (Cameroon) Herman Ngoudjo | (Uganda) Abdul Tebazalwa | 14:13 |
| Quarter-Final | (Canada) Andrew Kooner | (Namibia) Joshua Veikko | 20:9 |
| Semi-Final | (Tanzania) Michael Yomba | (Malaysia) Adnan Yusoh | 16:15 |
| Semi-Final | (Cameroon) Herman Ngoudjo | (Canada) Andrew Kooner | 17:16 |
| Final | (Tanzania) Michael Yomba | (Cameroon) Herman Ngoudjo | 19:13 |

=== Featherweight 57kg ===
| Round | Winner | Loser | Score |
|---|---|---|---|
| Preliminary | (Barbados) Mark Alexander | (Ghana) Anyetei Laryea | 6:3 |
| Preliminary | (Canada) Marty O'Donnell | (Malaysia) Thomas Benny Vivian | 11:6 |
| Preliminary | (South Africa) Siphiwe Nongqayi | (Botswana) Gilbert Khunwane | 8:6 |
| Preliminary | (Papua New Guinea) Lynch Ipera | (Cyprus) Polydoros Polydorou | 16:4 |
| Preliminary | (Australia) James Swan | (India) Gurmeet Sing | 17:7 |
| Quarter-Final | (Canada) Marty O'Donnell | (Barbados) Mark Alexander | 6:4 |
| Quarter-Final | (Papua New Guinea) Lynch Ipera | (South Africa) Siphiwe Nongqayi | KO 1 |
| Quarter-Final | (Australia) James Swan | (Northern Ireland) James Lowry | 18:9 |
| Quarter-Final | (Scotland) Alex Arthur | (Uganda) Kassim Napa Adam | 14:11 |
| Semi-Final | (Canada) Marty O'Donnell | (Papua New Guinea) Lynch Ipera | 14:12 |
| Semi-Final | (Scotland) Alex Arthur | (Australia) James Swan | 16:10 |
| Final | (Scotland) Alex Arthur | (Canada) Marty O'Donnell | 16:11 |

=== Lightweight 60kg ===
| Round | Winner | Loser | Score |
|---|---|---|---|
| Preliminary | (Ghana) Ray Narh | (Tanzania) Twalib Kimweri | RSC 4 |
| Preliminary | (Northern Ireland) Conor McAllister | (Barbados) John Kelman | 10:5 |
| Preliminary | (Malaysia) Muruguthevan Balakrishnan | (Botswana) Bikkie Malaolo | 14:7 |
| Preliminary | (England) Andy McLean | (Mauritius) Danny Labonte | 14:11 |
| Preliminary | (Mauritius) Giovanni Frontin | (Kenya) Collins Akweywa | RSC 5 |
| Preliminary | (South Africa) Elvis Makam | (Namibia) Frans Mumbuu | 25:15 |
| Preliminary | (Pakistan) Ali Asghar Shah | (Wales) Ceri Hall | 9:6 |
| Preliminary | (Australia) Matthew Pauley | (Zambia) Denis Zimba | 16:5 |
| Quarter-Final | (Ghana) Ray Narh | (Northern Ireland) Conor McAllister | 27:8 |
| Quarter-Final | (England) Andy McLean | (Malaysia) Muruguthevan Balakrishnan | 15:14 |
| Quarter-Final | (Mauritius) Giovanni Frontin | (South Africa) Elvis Makama | 18:13 |
| Quarter-Final | (Pakistan) Ali Asghar Shah | (Australia) Matthew Pauley | 16:15 |
| Semi-Final | (Ghana) Ray Narh | (England) Andy McLean | RSC 5 |
| Semi-Final | (Pakistan) Ali Asghar Shah | (Mauritius) Giovanni Frontin | 22:10 |
| Final | (Ghana) Ray Narh | (Pakistan) Ali Asghar Shah | 30:27 |

=== Light-welterweight 63.5kg ===
| Round | Winner | Loser | Score |
|---|---|---|---|
| Preliminary | (Jamaica) Trevor Brown | (Mozambique) Paulo Mandlatte | RSC 3 |
| Preliminary | (Australia) Casey Johns | (Scotland) Lee Sharp | 9:8 |
| Preliminary | (Northern Ireland) Paul McCloskey | (Samoa) Niusila Seiuli | 16:7 |
| Preliminary | (Seychelles) Gerry Legras | (New Zealand) Robert Walker | 22:2 |
| Preliminary | (Lesotho) Kloba Sehloho | (The Bahamas) Richard Dean | 20:6 |
| Preliminary | (Canada) Michael Strange | (Tanzania) Hassan Matumla | 21:7 |
| Preliminary | (Cameroon) Hamza Issa | (England) Nigel Wright | AB 5 |
| Preliminary | (Zambia) Davis Mwale | (South Africa) Isaac Tshuma | 20:16 |
| Quarter-Final | (Australia) Casey Johns | (Jamaica) Trevor Brown | 24:19 |
| Quarter-Final | (Seychelles) Gerry Legras | (Northern Ireland) Paul McCloskey | 18:15 |
| Quarter-Final | (Canada) Michael Strange | (Lesotho) Kloba Sehloho | 21:1 |
| Quarter-Final | (Zambia) Davis Mwale | (Cameroon) Hamza Issa | 22:19 |
| Semi-Final | (Canada) Michael Strange | (Zambia) Davis Mwale | 19:1 |
| Semi-Final | (Seychelles) Gerry Legras | (Australia) Casey Johns | 31:11 |
| Final | (Canada) Michael Strange | (Seychelles) Gerry Legras | 16:8 |

=== Welterweight 67kg ===
| Round | Winner | Loser | Score |
|---|---|---|---|
| Preliminary | (Scotland) Colin McNeil | (Lesotho) Mosolesa Tsie | 31:8 |
| Preliminary | (Botswana) Thebe Setlalekgosi | (Malaysia) Samsudin Maidin | 10:6 |
| Preliminary | (Samoa) Rico Chong Nee | (Tanzania) Rashid Matumla | 14:12 |
| Preliminary | (Kenya) Absolom Okoth | (Wales) Karl Thomas | 9:8 |
| Preliminary | (Australia) Lyndon Hosking | (Saint Vincent and the Grenadines) Fitz Roberts | RSC 2 |
| Preliminary | (Northern Ireland) Billy Cowan | (Ghana) Joshua Okine | 16:7 |
| Preliminary | (England) David Walker | (Cook Islands) David Masters | 14:2 |
| Preliminary | (Canada) Jeremy Molitor | (Cameroon) Ernest Atangana Mboa | 5:2 |
| Quarter-Final | (Scotland) Colin McNeil | (Botswana) Thebe Setlalekgosi | 37:16 |
| Quarter-Final | (Kenya) Absolom Okoth | (Samoa) Rico Chong Nee | 23:11 |
| Quarter-Final | (Australia) Lyndon Hosking | (Northern Ireland) Billy Cowan | 25:17 |
| Quarter-Final | (Canada) Jeremy Molitor | (England) David Walker | 20:12 |
| Semi-Final | (Kenya) Absolom Okoth | (Scotland) Colin McNeil | 27:12 |
| Semi-Final | (Canada) Jeremy Molitor | (Australia) Lyndon Hosking | 15:5 |
| Final | (Canada) Jeremy Molitor | (Kenya) Absolom Okoth | 14:9 |

=== Light-middleweight 71kg ===
| Round | Winner | Loser | Score |
|---|---|---|---|
| Quarter-Final | (Canada) Scott MacIntosh | (Jamaica) Patrick Daley | 22:11 |
| Quarter-Final | (Ghana) James Tony | (Cameroon) Oeme Bella | 22:14 |
| Quarter-Final | (Scotland) Jackie Townsley | (Cyprus) Savas Kokkinos | 21:11 |
| Quarter-Final | (England) Chris Bessey | (Australia) Richard Rowless | 21:10 |
| Semi-Final | (Canada) Scott MacIntosh | (Ghana) James Tony | 22:14 |
| Semi-Final | (England) Chris Bessey | (Scotland) Jackie Townsley | RSC 5 |
| Final | (England) Chris Bessey | (Canada) Scott MacIntosh | 20:15 |

=== Middleweight 75kg ===
| Round | Winner | Loser | Score |
|---|---|---|---|
| Preliminary | (Canada) Trevor Stewardson | (Seychelles) Jacques Bonnie | 10:5 |
| Preliminary | (Scotland) Alan Foster | (New Zealand) Daryl Litchwark | 9:7 |
| Preliminary | (India) Jitender Kumar | (Samoa) Francis Partsch | 13:3 |
| Preliminary | (Kenya) George Adipo | (Wales) Sean Pepperall | 17:7 |
| Quarter-Final | (Canada) Trevor Stewardson | (Scotland) Alan Foster | 20:19 |
| Quarter-Final | (India) Jitender Kumar | (Kenya) George Adipo | 29:15 |
| Quarter-Final | (England) John Pearce | (Australia) Danny Green | w/o |
| Quarter-Final | (Northern Ireland) Brian Magee | (Jamaica) Ron Donaldson | 25:14 |
| Semi-Final | (India) Jitender Kumar | (Canada) Trevor Stewardson | 21:10 |
| Semi-Final | (England) John Pearce | (Northern Ireland) Brian Magee | 29:19 |
| Final | (England) John Pearce | (India) Jitender Kumar | 25:11 |

=== Light-heavyweight 81kg ===
| Round | Winner | Loser | Score |
|---|---|---|---|
| Quarter-Final | (England) Courtney Fry | (Samoa) Pauga Lalau | 15:6 |
| Quarter-Final | (Kenya) Samuel Odindo | (Wales) Stephen Donaldson | 15:9 |
| Quarter-Final | (Ghana) Charles Adamu | (Barbados) Terry Shawn Cox | 9:5 |
| Quarter-Final | (Canada) Troy Ross | (India) Gurcharan Singh | 11:7 |
| Semi-Final | (England) Courtney Fry | (Kenya) Samuel Odindo | 17:8 |
| Semi-Final | (Canada) Troy Ross | (Ghana) Charles Adamu | RSC 2 |
| Final | (England) Courtney Fry | (Canada) Troy Ross | 29:21 |

=== Heavyweight 91kg ===
| Round | Winner | Loser | Score |
|---|---|---|---|
| Quarter-Final | (New Zealand) Garth da Silva | (Pakistan) Skoukat Ali | 22:9 |
| Quarter-Final | (Canada) Mark Simmons | (Ghana) Charles Quartey | 18:5 |
| Quarter-Final | (Seychelles) Roland Raforme | (Australia) Simon Peterson | RSC 5 |
| Quarter-Final | (Wales) Kevin Evans | (Northern Ireland) Ben McGarrigle | RSC 1 |
| Semi-Final | (Canada) Mark Simmons | (Wales) Kevin Evans | 19:11 |
| Semi-Final | (Seychelles) Roland Raforme | (New Zealand) Garth da Silva | 15:13 |
| Final | (Canada) Mark Simmons | (Seychelles) Roland Raforme | 21:13 |

=== Super Heavyweight +91kg ===
| Round | Winner | Loser | Score |
|---|---|---|---|
| Quarter-Final | (Australia) Justin Whitehead | (Canada) Patrice L'Heureux | 13:12 |
| Quarter-Final | (England) Audley Harrison | (New Zealand) Payfaii Falamoe | 8:3 |
| Quarter-Final | (Mauritius) Michael Macaque | (Jamaica) Owen Beck | 27:22 |
| Quarter-Final | (Ghana) Aloryi Moyoyo Mensah | (Samoa) Peter Williams | 17:15 |
| Semi-Final | (England) Audley Harrison | (Australia) Justin Whitehead | KO 3 |
| Semi-Final | (Mauritius) Michael Macaque | (Ghana) Aloryi Moyoyo Mensah | 21:11 |
| Final | (England) Audley Harrison | (Mauritius) Michael Macaque | KO 1 |
