= Boxing at the 2000 Summer Olympics – Light flyweight =

Boxing competitions

Men's light flyweight boxing at the Games of the XXVII Olympiad
- Venue: Sydney Convention and Exhibition Centre
- Date: 17 September to 30 September 2000
- Competitors: 27 from 27 nations

Medalists
1st place, gold medalist(s)		Brahim Asloum	France
2nd place, silver medalist(s)		Rafael Lozano	Spain
3rd place, bronze medalist(s)		Maikro Romero	Cuba
3rd place, bronze medalist(s)		Kim Un-Chol	North Korea

The men's light flyweight boxing competition at the 2000 Olympic Games in Sydney was held from 17 September to 30 September at the Sydney Convention and Exhibition Centre.

== Competition format ==
Like all Olympic boxing events, the competition was a straight single-elimination tournament. This event consisted of 27 boxers who have qualified for the competition through various qualifying tournaments held in 1999 and 2000. The competition began with a preliminary round on 17 September, where the number of competitors was reduced to 16, and concluded with the final on 30 September. As there were fewer than 32 boxers in the competition, a number of boxers received a bye through the preliminary round. Both semi-final losers were awarded bronze medals.

All bouts consisted of four rounds of two minutes each, with one-minute breaks between rounds. Punches scored only if the white area on the front of the glove made full contact with the front of the head or torso of the opponent. Five judges scored each bout; three of the judges had to signal a scoring punch within one second for the punch to score. The winner of the bout was the boxer who scored the most valid punches by the end of the bout.

== Start list ==
Name	Country
Danilo Lerio	Philippines
Rafael Lozano	Spain
Phumzile Matyhila	South Africa
Suleiman Bilali	Kenya
Pal Lakatos	Hungary
Kim Un-chol	North Korea
Sebusiso Keketsi	Lesotho
Liborio Romero	Mexico
Mbarek Soltani	Algeria
Muhamed Kizito	Uganda
Ivanas Stepovičius	Lithuania
Soubam Suresh Singh	India
Kim Ki-suk	South Korea
La Paene Masara	Indonesia
Iván Calderón	Puerto Rico
Rezkalla Abdelaehim	Egypt
Brahim Asloum	France
Sergey Kazakov	Russia
Brian Violoria	United States
Dilshod Yuldashev	Uzbekistan
Suban Pannon	Thailand
Valeriy Sidorenko	Ukraine
José Albuquerque	Brazil
José Luis Varela	Venezuela
Maikro Romero	Cuba
Ramazan Ballioglu	Turkey
Marian Valicu	Romania

== Schedule ==
All times are Australian Time (UTC+10)

Date	Time	Round
Sunday, 17 September 2000	13:00 & 19:30	Round of 32
Friday, 22 September 2000	13:00 & 19:30	Round of 16
Tuesday, 26 September 2000	13:00 & 19:30	Quarterfinals
Thursday, 28 September 2000	19:30	Semifinals
Saturday, 30 September 2000	13:00	Final Bout

== Results ==
Round of 32
Kim Un-chol (PRK)	RSC
Sebusiso Keketsi (LES)
Liborio Romero (MEX)	16
Mbarek Soltani (ALG)	15
Muhamed Kizito (UGA)	3
Ivanas Stapovičius (LTU)	9
Soubam Suresh Singh (IND)	5
Kim Ki-suk (KOR)	9
La Paene Masara (INA)	10
Iván Calderón (PUR)	5
Rezkalla Abdelrehim (EGY)	3
Brahim Asloum (FRA)	12
Sergey Kazakov (RUS)	6
Brian Viloria (USA)	8
Dilshod Yuldashev (UZB)	16
Suban Pannon (THA)	18
Valeriy Sidorenko (UKR)	12
José Albuquerque (BRA)	7
José Luis Varela (VEN)	11
Maikro Romero (CUB)	15
Ramazan Ballioğlu (TUR)	8
Marian Velicu (ROM)	20

Round of 16
Danilo Lerio (PHI)	17
Rafael Lozano (ESP)	25
Phumzile Matyhila (RSA)
Suleiman Bilali (KEN)	RSC
Pal Lakatos (HUN)	8
Kim Un-chol (PRK)	20
Liborio Romero (MEX)	11
Ivanas Stapovičius (LTU)	24
Kim Ki-suk (KOR)	8
La Paene Masara (INA)	4
Brahim Asloum (FRA)	6
Brian Viloria (USA)	4
Suban Pannon (THA)
Valeriy Sidorenko (UKR)	RSC
Maikro Romero (CUB)	RSC
Marian Velicu (ROM)

Quarterfinals
Rafael Lozano (ESP)	11
Suleiman Bilali (KEN)	10
Kim Un-chol (PRK)	22
Ivanas Stapovičius (LTU)	10
Kim Ki-suk (KOR)	8
Brahim Asloum (FRA)	12
Valeriy Sidorenko (UKR)	5
Maikro Romero (CUB)	12

Semifinals
Rafael Lozano (ESP)	15
Kim Un-chol (PRK)	10
Brahim Asloum (FRA)	13
Maikro Romero (CUB)	12

Final
Rafael Lozano (ESP)	10
Brahim Asloum (FRA)	23
