= Boxing at the 2002 South American Games =

Boxing competitions

The Boxing Tournament at the 2002 South American Games was held in the Ginásio da Escola de Educação Física in Belém, Brazil from August 5 to August 11, 2002.

== Medal winners ==
Event	Gold	Silver	Bronze
Light Flyweight (– 48 kilograms)	Patricio Calero (ECU)	Carlos Luis Campos (VEN)	—
Flyweight (– 51 kilograms)	James Dean Pereira (BRA)	Santiago Acosta (ARG)	Jean Piero Pérez (VEN); Modesto Ramírez (ECU)
Bantamweight (– 54 kilograms)	Alexander Espinoza (VEN)	Ceferino Labarda (ARG)	—
Featherweight (– 57 kilograms)	Nehomar Cermeño (VEN)	Myke Carvalho (BRA)	—
Lightweight (– 60 kilograms)	Diego Chango (ECU)	Alessandro Matos (BRA)	—
Light Welterweight (– 63.5 kilograms)	Patrick López (VEN)	Pablo Ernesto Oliveto (ARG)	André Nascimento (BRA); Lennon Allen (GUY)
Welterweight (– 67 kilograms)	Erivan Conceição (BRA)	Jean Carlos Prada (VEN)	—
Light Middleweight (– 71 kilograms)	Glaucélio Abreu (BRA)	Jinner Guerrero Quintero (ECU)	Fabian Leonardo Velardes (ARG); Rayon O'Neil (GUY)
Middleweight (– 75 kilograms)	Joilson Gomes dos Santos (BRA)	Pedro Calla (PER)	—
Light Heavyweight (– 81 kilograms)	Washington Silva (BRA)	Edgar Muñoz (VEN)	—
Heavyweight (– 91 kilograms)	Edson Vieira (BRA)	Anthony Ignacio (ARU)	—
Super Heavyweight (+ 91 kilograms)	Beber Espinoza (ECU)	Ubiratan Costa (BRA)	—

== Medal table ==
Rank	Nation	Gold	Silver	Bronze	Total
1	Brazil (BRA)	6	2	3	11
2	Venezuela (VEN)	3	3	1	7
3	Ecuador (ECU)	3	1	1	5
4	Argentina (ARG)	0	3	5	8
5	Peru (PER)	0	1	1	2
6	Aruba (ARU)	0	1	0	1
7	Guyana (GUY)	0	0	5	5
8	Chile (CHI)	0	0	2	2
9	Paraguay (PAR)	0	0	0	0
Totals (9 entries)		12	11	18	41
