= Boxing at the 1996 Summer Olympics – Flyweight =

Boxing competitions

Flyweight boxing at the Games of the XXVI Olympiad
- Venue: Alexander Memorial Coliseum
- Dates: 23 July – 4 August 1996
- Competitors: 32 from 32 nations

Medalists
1st place, gold medalist(s)		Maikro Romero	Cuba
2nd place, silver medalist(s)		Bulat Jumadilov	Kazakhstan
3rd place, bronze medalist(s)		Albert Pakeyev	Russia
3rd place, bronze medalist(s)		Zoltan Lunka	Germany

The Flyweight class in the boxing at the 1996 Summer Olympics competition was the second-lightest class at the 1996 Summer Olympics in Atlanta, Georgia. The weight class is open for boxers from 51 kilograms. The competition started on 23 July 1996 and ended on 4 August 1996.

== Medalists ==
Gold	Maikro Romero; Cuba
Silver	Bulat Jumadilov; Kazakhstan
Bronze	Albert Pakeyev; Russia
Bronze	Zoltan Lunka; Germany

== Results ==
1st Round
1	Albert Pakeyev (RUS)	8
32	Richard Sunee (MRI)	1
17	Mohamad Zbir (MAR)	4
16	Boniface Mukuka (ZAM)	11
9	Tebebu Behonegn (ETH)	2
24	Daniel Reyes (COL)	16
25	Khaled Falah (SYR)	11
8	Parmuansak Phosuvan (THA)	9
5	Lernik Papyan (ARM)	10
28	Kazumasa Tsujimoto (JPN)	5
21	Maikro Romero (CUB)	24
12	Eric Morel (USA)	12
13	Igor Samoilenco (MDA)	20
20	Omar Adorno (PUR)	8
29	Arson Mapfumo (ZIM)	2
4	Elias Recaido (PHI)	13
3	Howard Gereo (PNG)	4
30	Mehdi Assous (ALG)	11
19	Omar Andrés Narváez (ARG)	9
14	Joan Guzmán (DOM)	4
11	Hermensen Ballo (INA)	6
22	Guy-Elie Boulingui (GAB)	2
27	Martín Castillo (MEX)	7
6	Zoltan Lunka (GER)	13
7	Vladislav Neiman (ISR)	7
26	Bulat Jumadilov (KAZ)	18
23	Serhiy Kovganko (UKR)	12
10	Darwin Angeles (HON)	6
15	Damaen Kelly (IRL)	12
18	Yuliyan Strogov (BUL)	11
31	Carmine Molaro (ITA)	8
2	Hussein Hussein (AUS)	11

2nd Round
Albert Pakeyev (RUS)	13
Borniface Muluka (ZAM)	4
Daniel Reyes (COL)	15
Khaled Falah (SYR)	13
Lernik Papyan (ARM)	6
Maikro Romero (CUB)	22
Samoilenco (MDA)	8
Elias Recaido (PHI)	12
Mehdi Assous (ALG)	20
Omar Andrés Narváez (ARG)	4
Hermensen Ballo (INA)	12
Zoltan Lunka (GER)	18
Bulat Jumadilov (KAZ)	21
Serhiy Kovganko (UKR)	4
Damaen Kelly (IRL)	27
Hussein Hussein (AUS)	20

Quarterfinals
Albert Pakeyev (RUS)	13
Daniel Reyes (COL)	13
Maikro Romero (CUB)	18
Elias Recaido (PHI)	3
Mehdi Assous (ALG)	6
Zoltan Lunka (GER)	19
Bulat Jumadilov (KAZ)	13
Damaen Kelly (IRL)	6

Semifinals
Albert Pakeyev (RUS)	6
Maikro Romero (CUB)	12
Zoltan Lunka (GER)	18
Bulat Jumadilov (KAZ)	23

Finals
Maikro Romero (CUB)	12
Bulat Jumadilov (KAZ)	11
