= Diego Chaves (boxer) =

Argentine boxer

Personal information
- Nickname: La Joya
- Born: Diego Gabriel Chaves; 7 April 1986 (age 40) San Miguel, Buenos Aires, Argentina
- Height: 5 ft 7 1/2 in (171 cm)
- Weight: Welterweight; Light middleweight

Boxing career
- Reach: 66 1/2 in (169 cm)
- Stance: Orthodox

Boxing record
- Total fights: 42
- Wins: 30
- Win by KO: 24
- Losses: 11
- Draws: 1
Medal record
Men's Boxing
Representing Argentina
South American Games
| Silver medal – second place | 2006 Buenos Aires | Welterweight |
Pan American Games
| Bronze medal – third place | 2007 Rio | Welterweight |

Diego Gabriel Chaves (born 7 April 1986) is an Argentine professional boxer who held the WBA interim welterweight title from 2012 to 2013.

== Early life ==
Diego Chaves was born on 7 April 1986, in San Miguel, Argentina. Chaves had a stint as a football player in the junior divisions of Argentine club Velez Sársfield before dedicating his life to boxing. His grandfather, Rudecindo, was also a boxer who fought at middleweight in Argentina in the 1970s.

Before turning pro, Chaves represented Argentina in the 2007 Pan American Games where he won the bronze medal in the welterweight category. He also participated in the Americas qualifying tournament for the 2008 Summer Olympics but was eliminated.

== Professional career ==
Chaves made his debut at the age of 22 on 5 July 2008, against fellow countryman Juan José Islas in the town of Castelli, Buenos Aires. Chaves won by knockout in the third round. After a string of victories on home soil, Chaves fought obtained the WBO Latino light middleweight after defeating Brazilian fighter Uilian Santana Barauna. Chaves made only one defense of this title before winning the vacant WBO Latino welterweight title against another boxer from Brazil, Daniel Saboia.

Around that time, Chaves had his first fight outside Argentina, winning a non-title fight by unanimous decision against Brazilian Edvan Dos Santos Barros at the Hard Rock Hotel and Casino in Paradise, Nevada, United States. Chaves then returned to Argentina, where he made five successful defenses of his WBO Latino welterweight belt before defeating French boxer Ismael El Massoudi to become WBA Interim Welterweight Champion on 21 July 2012. Since then, Chaves has successfully defended his Interim title once on 22 September 2012, defeating Panamanian boxer José Miranda by technical knockout in the second of twelve rounds. He would lose the interim title in his next fight to American Keith Thurman.

== Professional boxing record ==
| 42 fights | 30 wins | 11 losses |
|---|---|---|
| By knockout | 24 | 6 |
| By decision | 6 | 4 |
| By disqualification | 0 | 1 |
| Draws | 1 | |

| No. | Result | Record | Opponent | Type | Round, time | Date | Location | Notes |
|---|---|---|---|---|---|---|---|---|
| 42 | Loss | 30–11–1 | Kévin Lele Sadjo | TKO | 4 (10), 2:11 | 14 Dec 2024 | Grand Hyatt Baha Mar, Nassau, The Bahamas | |
| 41 | Loss | 30–10–1 | Vlad Tuinov | UD | 6 | 25 May 2024 | Vladikavkaz, Russia | |
| 40 | Win | 30–9–1 | Brian Agustin Arregui | UD | 10 | 1 Mar 2024 | Club Social y Deportivo El Porvenir, Quilmes, Argentina | |
| 39 | Win | 29–9–1 | Matias Raimundo Diaz | TKO | 3 (8) | 15 Dec 2023 | Estadio Luna Park, Buenos Aires, Argentina | |
| 38 | Loss | 28–9–1 | Jonathan Wilson Sanchez | TKO | 5 (8) | 12 Nov 2022 | Asociación Atlética Argentinos Juniors, Buenos Aires, Argentina | |
| 37 | Loss | 28–8–1 | Sergei Vorobev | UD | 10 | 25 Dec 2021 | Concert Hall Mir, Moscow, Russia | |
| 36 | Loss | 28–7–1 | Juan Hernan Leal | MD | 10 | 14 Aug 2021 | Club Ferro Carril Oeste, Merlo Partido, Argentina | For WBO Latino welterweight title |
| 35 | Win | 28–6–1 | Marcelo Fabian Bzowski | UD | 8 | 13 Feb 2021 | Complejo Multifunción, Pérez, Santa Fe, Argentina | |
| 34 | Loss | 27–6–1 | Gabriel Maestre | TKO | 4 (10), 2:14 | 19 Dec 2019 | Coliseo Sugar Baby Rojas, Barranquilla, Colombia | For WBA Fedebol super welterweight title |
| 33 | Loss | 27–5–1 | Magomed Kurbanov | UD | 12 | 2 Nov 2019 | RCC Boxing Academy, Ekaterinburg, Russia | For vacant WBO International super welterweight title |
| 32 | Win | 27–4–1 | Jean Carlos Prada | KO | 2 (10) | 23 Nov 2018 | Club Los Indios, Buenos Aires, Argentina | |
| 31 | Loss | 26–4–1 | Thulani Mbenge | TKO | 7 (12), 0:36 | 23 Jun 2018 | Emperors Palace, Kempton Park, South Africa | For vacant IBO welterweight title |
| 30 | Loss | 26–3–1 | Jamal James | KO | 3 (10), 2:12 | 15 Dec 2017 | Pioneer Event Center, Lancaster, California, U.S. | |
| 29 | Win | 26–2–1 | Jean Carlos Prada | KO | 2 (10), 0:57 | 17 Jun 2017 | Microestadio Municipal, Hurlingham, Buenos Aires, Argentina | |
| 28 | Win | 25–2–1 | Luis Pablo Zarate | TKO | 1 (10), 0:55 | 18 Nov 2016 | Club Social, Quilmes, Buenos Aires, Argentina | |
| 27 | Win | 24–2–1 | Jorge Daniel Miranda | TKO | 5 (8), 0:01 | 22 Jul 2016 | Club Los Indios, Buenos Aires, Argentina | |
| 26 | Draw | 23–2–1 | Timothy Bradley | SD | 12 | 13 Dec 2014 | Cosmopolitan of Las Vegas, Paradise, Nevada, U.S. | |
| 25 | Loss | 23–2 | Brandon Rios | DQ | 9 (10), 1:26 | 2 Aug 2014 | Cosmopolitan of Las Vegas, Paradise, Nevada, U.S. | Chaves disqualified for repeated fouls |
| 24 | Win | 23–1 | Juan Alberto Godoy | TKO | 3 (10), 2:49 | 15 Feb 2014 | Club Jacobo Urso, Saladillo, Argentina | |
| 23 | Loss | 22–1 | Keith Thurman | KO | 10 (12), 0:28 | 27 Jul 2013 | AT&T Center, San Antonio, Texas, U.S. | Lost WBA interim welterweight title |
| 22 | Win | 22–0 | José Miranda | TKO | 2 (12), 1:59 | 22 Sep 2012 | Estadio Luna Park, Buenos Aires, Argentina | Retained WBA interim welterweight title |
| 21 | Win | 21–0 | Ismael El Massoudi | KO | 2 (12), 1:15 | 21 Jul 2012 | Sociedad Alemana de Gimnasia, Buenos Aires, Argentina | Won WBA interim welterweight title |
| 20 | Win | 20–0 | Jorge Miranda | KO | 3 (12), 2:05 | 26 Nov 2011 | Club Atlético Vélez Sarsfield, Buenos Aires, Argentina | Retained WBO Latino welterweight title |
| 19 | Win | 19–0 | Eduardo Flores | TKO | 9 (12) | 30 Jul 2011 | Club Atlético Vélez Sarsfield, Buenos Aires, Argentina | Retained WBO Latino welterweight title |
| 18 | Win | 18–0 | Héctor Santana | TKO | 2 (12), 2:12 | 7 May 2011 | Ce.De.M. N° 2, Buenos Aires, Argentina | Retained WBO Latino welterweight title |
| 17 | Win | 17–0 | Omar Weis | UD | 12 | 21 Jan 2011 | Club Los Indios, Buenos Aires, Argentina | Retained WBO Latino welterweight title |
| 16 | Win | 16–0 | José Mosquera | TKO | 1 (10), 2:20 | 30 Oct 2010 | Club Atlético Vélez Sarsfield, Buenos Aires, Argentina | |
| 15 | Win | 15–0 | Jefferson Luís Gonçalo | UD | 12 | 7 Aug 2010 | Club Los Indios, Buenos Aires, Argentina | Retained WBO Latino welterweight title |
| 14 | Win | 14–0 | Edvan Dos Santos Barros | UD | 6 | 27 Mar 2010 | Hard Rock Hotel and Casino, Paradise, Nevada, U.S. | |
| 13 | Win | 13–0 | Daniel Saboia | TKO | 4 (12), 2:18 | 23 Jan 2010 | Club Once Unidos, Buenos Aires, Argentina | Won WBO Latino welterweight title |
| 12 | Win | 12–0 | Walter Díaz | RTD | 2 (12), 2:20 | 8 Oct 2009 | Club Los Indios, Buenos Aires, Argentina | Retained WBO Latino junior middleweight title |
| 11 | Win | 11–0 | Uilian Santana Barauna | KO | 1 (12), 2:00 | 18 Jul 2009 | Casino de Mina Clavero, Cordoba, Argentina | Won WBO Latino junior middleweight title |
| 10 | Win | 10–0 | Marcelo Miranda | UD | 10 | 12 Jun 2009 | Sociedad de Fomento Julio A. Roca, Buenos Aires, Argentina | |
| 9 | Win | 9–0 | Marcelo Miranda | KO | 1 (6), 0:58 | 25 Apr 2009 | Gimnasio Municipal, Neuquén, Argentina | |
| 8 | Win | 8–0 | Diego Zenteno | TKO | 1 (10), 1:30 | 21 Mar 2009 | Club Sportivo La Calera, Cordoba, Argentina | |
| 7 | Win | 7–0 | Norberto Acosta | RTD | 2 (10), 0:01 | 31 Jan 2009 | Club Social y Deportivo Mar de Ajó, Buenos Aires, Argentina | |
| 6 | Win | 6–0 | Javier Mendoza Suárez | TKO | 2 (6), 2:25 | 27 Dec 2008 | Club Argentino, Córdoba, Argentina | |
| 5 | Win | 5–0 | Diego Ledesma | KO | 2 (6), 1:02 | 28 Nov 2008 | Club Social y Deportivo 12 de Octubre, Buenos Aires, Argentina | |
| 4 | Win | 4–0 | Carlos Agnuz | KO | 2 (6) | 10 Oct 2008 | Sociedad de Fomento Julio A. Roca, Buenos Aires, Argentina | |
| 3 | Win | 3–0 | Raúl Rojas | KO | 1 (6) | 6 Sep 2008 | Polideportivo Municipal, Buenos Aires, Argentina | |
| 2 | Win | 2–0 | Luis Alberto Ponce | KO | 1 (6), 1:18 | 18 Jul 2008 | Club Sarmiento, Buenos Aires, Argentina | |
| 1 | Win | 1–0 | Juan José Islas | KO | 3 (4), 0:52 | 5 Jul 2008 | Club Deportivo Castelli, Buenos Aires, Argentina | |

Sporting positions
Regional boxing titles
| Vacant Title last held by Joel Julio | WBO Latino light-middleweight champion July 18, 2009 – 2010; Vacated | Vacant Title next held by Mike Miranda |
| Vacant Title last held by Euri González | WBO Latino welterweight champion January 23, 2010 – July 21, 2012; Won interim title | Vacant Title next held by William Silva |
World boxing titles
| Preceded by Ismael El Massoudi | WBA welterweight champion Interim title July 21, 2012 – July 27, 2013 | Succeeded by Keith Thurman |
