= Albert Pakeyev =

Russian boxer

Personal information
- Full name: Альберт Александрович Пакеев
- Nationality: Russia
- Born: July 4, 1968 (age 58) Usolye-Sibirskoye, Irkutsk Oblast
- Height: 1.65 m (5 ft 5 in)
- Weight: 51 kg (112 lb)

Sport
- Sport: Boxing
- Weight class: Flyweight
- Club: Dynamo Irkutsk
Medal record
Olympic Games
| Bronze medal – third place | 1996 Atlanta | Flyweight |
European Amateur Championships
| Gold medal – first place | 1996 Vejle | Flyweight |

Albert Aleksandrovich Pakeyev, or Albert Pakeev, (Russian: Альберт Александрович Пакеев; born July 4, 1968) is a boxer from Russia who won the bronze medal in the Men's Flyweight (– 51 kg) division at the 1996 Summer Olympics in Atlanta, United States. He won the title at the 1996 European Amateur Boxing Championships in Vejle, Denmark.

== Biography and career ==
Pakeyev's first couch was Mikhail Berko.

== Olympic results ==
- Defeated Richard Sunee (Mauritius) 8–1
- Defeated Borniface Muluka (Zambia) 13–4
- Defeated Daniel Reyes (Colombia) 13–13
- Lost to Maikro Romero (Cuba) 6–12
