= Boxing at the 1999 Pan American Games =

The Men's Boxing Tournament at the 1999 Pan American Games was held in Winnipeg, Manitoba, Canada from July 31 to August 8. It served as a qualification tournament for the 2000 Summer Olympics in Sydney, Australia. The number one and two earned a ticket for the Olympic Tournament.

== Medal summary ==
=== Medal table ===
* Host nation (Canada)

Rank	NOC's	Gold	Silver	Bronze	Total
1	Cuba	9	0	3	12
2	Argentina	2	0	3	5
3	United States	1	3	4	8
4	Canada*	0	5	1	6
5	Brazil	0	2	2	4
6	Mexico	0	1	3	4
6	Venezuela	0	1	3	4
8	Jamaica	0	0	2	2
9	Colombia	0	0	1	1
9	Ecuador	0	0	1	1
9	Puerto Rico	0	0	1	1
Totals (11 entries)		12	12	24	48

=== Medallists ===
Event	Gold	Silver	Bronze
Light Flyweight (– 48 kilograms)	Maikro Romero; Cuba	Liborio Romero; Mexico	Iván Calderón; Puerto Rico
Light Flyweight (– 48 kilograms)	Maikro Romero; Cuba	Liborio Romero; Mexico	Patricio Calero; Ecuador
Flyweight (– 51 kilograms)	Omar Andrés Narváez; Argentina	José Navarro; United States	Daniel Ponce de León; Mexico
Flyweight (– 51 kilograms)	Omar Andrés Narváez; Argentina	José Navarro; United States	Manuel Mantilla; Cuba
Bantamweight (– 54 kilograms)	Gerald Tucker; United States	Nehomar Cermeno; Venezuela	Waldemar Font; Cuba
Bantamweight (– 54 kilograms)	Gerald Tucker; United States	Nehomar Cermeno; Venezuela	Ceferino Labarda; Argentina
Featherweight (– 57 kilograms)	Yudel Johnson; Cuba	Zayas Younan; Canada	Jorge Martínez; Mexico
Featherweight (– 57 kilograms)	Yudel Johnson; Cuba	Zayas Younan; Canada	Aaron Torres; United States
Lightweight (– 60 kilograms)	Mario Kindelán; Cuba	Dana Laframboise; Canada	Patrick López; Venezuela
Lightweight (– 60 kilograms)	Mario Kindelán; Cuba	Dana Laframboise; Canada	Cristian Bejarano; Mexico
Light Welterweight (– 63.5 kilograms)	Victor Hugo Castro; Argentina	Kelson Santos; Brazil	Diógenes Luña; Cuba
Light Welterweight (– 63.5 kilograms)	Victor Hugo Castro; Argentina	Kelson Santos; Brazil	Corey Bernard; United States
Welterweight (– 67 kilograms)	Juan Hernández Sierra; Cuba	Jeremy Molitor; Canada	LeChaunce Shepherd; United States
Welterweight (– 67 kilograms)	Juan Hernández Sierra; Cuba	Jeremy Molitor; Canada	Charlie Navarro; Venezuela
Light Middleweight (– 71 kilograms)	Jorge Gutiérrez; Cuba	Scott MacIntosh; Canada	Darnell Wilson; United States
Light Middleweight (– 71 kilograms)	Jorge Gutiérrez; Cuba	Scott MacIntosh; Canada	David Sean Black; Jamaica
Middleweight (– 75 kilograms)	Yohanson Martínez; Cuba	Arthur Palac; United States	José Herrera; Colombia
Middleweight (– 75 kilograms)	Yohanson Martínez; Cuba	Arthur Palac; United States	Jim Rodriguez; Venezuela
Light Heavyweight (– 81 kilograms)	Humberto Savigne; Cuba	Laudelino Barros; Brazil	Troy Amos-Ross; Canada
Light Heavyweight (– 81 kilograms)	Humberto Savigne; Cuba	Laudelino Barros; Brazil	Hugo Garay; Argentina
Heavyweight (– 91 kilograms)	Odlanier Solis; Cuba	Mark Simmons; Canada	Marcelino Novaes; Brazil
Heavyweight (– 91 kilograms)	Odlanier Solis; Cuba	Mark Simmons; Canada	Kerron Speid; Jamaica
Super Heavyweight (+ 91 kilograms)	Alexis Rubalcaba; Cuba	Davin King; United States	Claudio Silva; Brazil
Super Heavyweight (+ 91 kilograms)	Alexis Rubalcaba; Cuba	Davin King; United States	Manuel Azar; Argentina
