= Papian =

Papian (Armenian: Պապյան), also transliterated as Papyan, is an Armenian surname. Notable people with the surname include:

- Ara Papian (born 1961), Armenian lawyer, historian and diplomat
- Hasmik Papian (born 1961), Armenian soprano
- Lernik Papyan (born 1966), Soviet and Armenian boxer
