= Hegney =

Hegney is a surname. Notable people with the surname include:

- Bill Hegney (1896–1982), Australian politician
- James Hegney (1891–1970), Australian politician
- James Hegney (boxer) (born 1978), English boxer
