= Jitender Kumar =

Jitender Kumar may refer to:

- Jitender Kumar (boxer, born 1977), Indian middleweight boxer
- Jitender Kumar (boxer, born 1988), Indian flyweight boxer

== See also ==
- Jitendra Kumar, Indian actor
