= Brahim Asloum =

French boxer (born 1979)

Brahim Asloum إبراهيم اسلوم
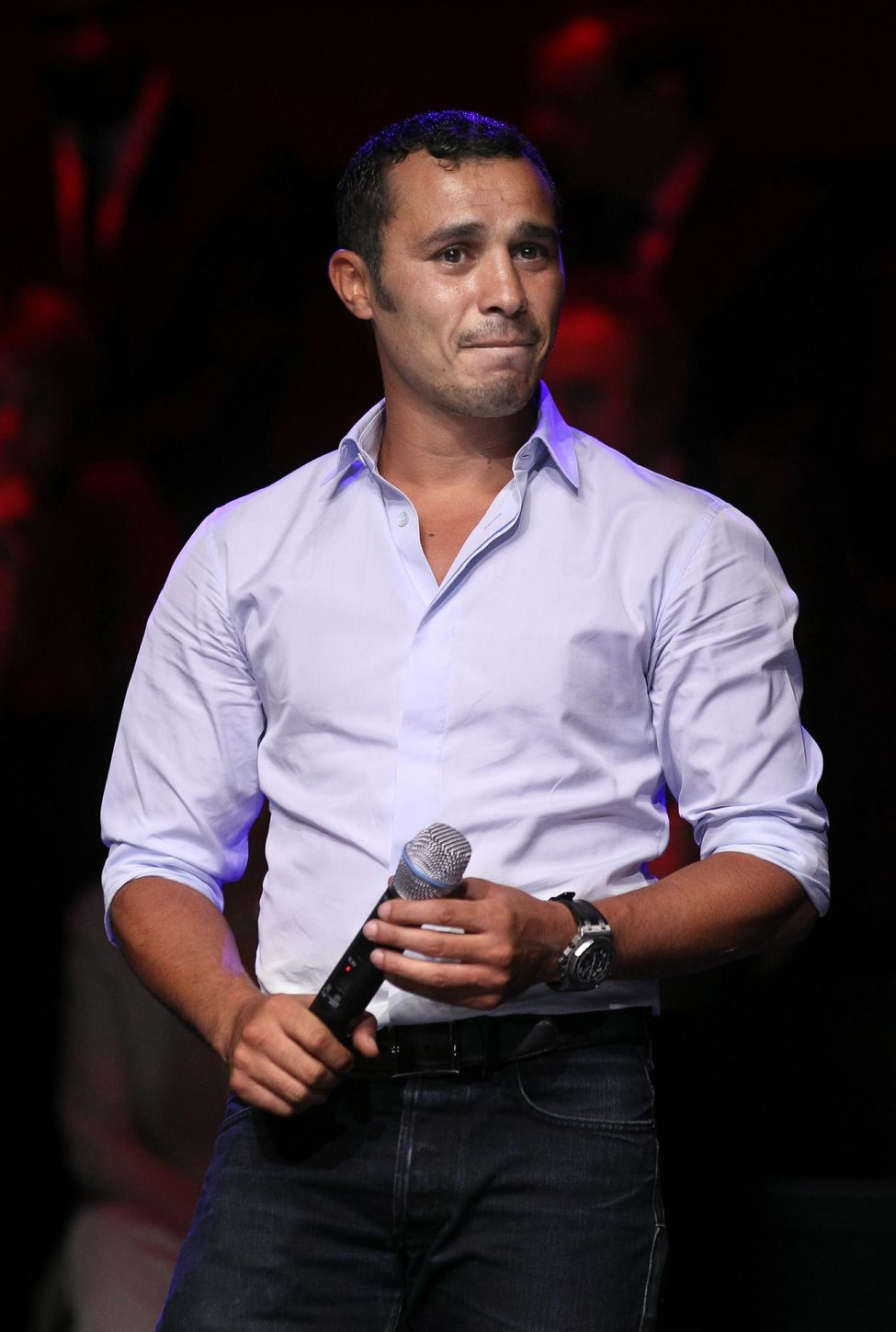

Personal information
- Born: 31 January 1979 (age 47) Bourgoin-Jallieu, France
- Height: 5 ft 5 in (165 cm)
- Weight: Light flyweight; Flyweight

Boxing career
- Stance: Southpaw (Note: Listed by BoxRec as Southpaw, but regularly switch-hits as an Orthodox)

Boxing record
- Total fights: 26
- Wins: 24
- Win by KO: 10
- Losses: 2
Medal record
Men's Amateur boxing
Representing France
Olympic Games
Gold medal – first place	2000 Sydney	Light flyweight

Brahim Asloum (French pronunciation: [bʁaim aslum]; Arabic: إبراهيم اسلوم, born 31 January 1979) is a French amateur boxer. He held the WBA light flyweight title from 2007 to 2009. Asloum won the Light Flyweight Gold medal at the 2000 Summer Olympics. His Olympic win was France's first Olympic gold medal in boxing in 64 years.

== Olympic results ==
- Defeated Mohamed Rezkalla (Egypt) 12-3
- Defeated Brian Viloria (United States) 6-4
- Defeated Kim Ki-Suk (South Korea) 12-8
- Defeated Maikro Romero (Cuba) 13-12
- Defeated Rafael Lozano (Spain) 23-10

== Professional career ==
Asloum began his professional career in 2001 and went on a streak of 19 consecutive victories to earn a shot at WBA Flyweight Title holder Lorenzo Parra. Parra dominated the fight, dropping Asloum in the 2nd and taking a unanimous decision.

On 10 March 2007 he got another opportunity at a world title when he faced Omar Narváez for the WBO flyweight title, he would also lose again via a unanimous decision.

On 8 December 2007 he defeated Juan Carlos Reveco to become the WBA Light Flyweight Champion.

Asloum was inactive after the Reveco fight until his return to the ring 27 April 2009. In July 2008 the WBA changed his status from "World Champion" to "Champion in Recess." When he did return to the ring, Asloum knocked out Humberto Pool in the third round of a non-title flyweight bout. On 6 September 2009 Asloum announced his retirement from boxing. Asloum cited his dispute with cable channel Canal Plus as the cause for him to stop boxing, Canal Plus was the promoter of Asloum's fights.

== Professional boxing record ==
26 fights	24 wins	2 losses
By knockout	10	0
By decision	14	2

No.	Result	Record	Opponent	Type	Round, time	Date	Location	Notes
26	Win	24–2	Humberto Pool	KO	3 (10)	2009-04-27	La Palestre, Le Cannet, France	
25	Win	23–2	Juan Carlos Reveco	UD	12 (12)	2007-12-08	La Palestre, Le Cannet, France	Won WBA light-flyweight title
24	Win	22–2	Wellington Vicente	KO	9 (10)	2007-09-15	Stadthalle, Rostock, France	
23	Loss	21–2	Omar Narváez	UD	12 (12)	2007-03-10	La Palestre, Le Cannet, France	For WBO flyweight title
22	Win	21–1	Rafael Lozano	TKO	4 (12)	2006-12-02	Palais Omnisport de Paris-Bercy, Paris, France	Retained WBA Inter-Continental flyweight title
21	Win	20–1	José Jiménez	UD	12 (12)	2006-07-15	La Palestre, Le Cannet, France	Retained WBA Inter-Continental flyweight title
20	Loss	19–1	Lorenzo Parra	UD	12 (12)	2005-12-05	Palais Omnisport de Paris-Bercy, Paris, France	For WBA flyweight title
19	Win	19–0	Édgar Velásquez	TD	8 (12)	2005-07-09	La Palestre, Le Cannet, France	Retained WBA Inter-Continental flyweight title
18	Win	18–0	José Antonio López Bueno	KO	3 (12)	2005-03-14	Palais des Sports, Paris, France	Retained European flyweight title
17	Win	17–0	Noel Arambulet	UD	12 (12)	2004-11-08	Palais Omnisport de Paris-Bercy, Paris, France	
16	Win	16–0	Aleksandr Makhmutov	UD	12 (12)	2004-07-10	La Palestre, Le Cannet, France	Retained European flyweight title
15	Win	15–0	Iván Pozo	UD	12 (12)	2004-04-29	Palais des Sports, Levallois-Perret, France	Retained European flyweight title
14	Win	14–0	José Antonio López Bueno	MD	12 (12)	2003-11-14	Palais des Sports, Levallois-Perret, France	Won vacant WBO Inter-Continental & European flyweight titles
13	Win	13–0	Steffen Norskov	UD	12 (12)	2003-07-04	Futuroscope, Chasseneuil-du-Poitou, France	Won vacant WBA Inter-Continental flyweight title
12	Win	12–0	Zolile Mbityi	UD	8 (8)	2003-04-04	Maison des Sports, Clermont-Ferrand, France	
11	Win	11–0	Christophe Rodrigues	SD	10 (10)	2002-12-05	Palais des Sports, Levallois-Perret, France	Won French flyweight title
10	Win	10–0	Pornchai Ratsopha	TKO	4 (8)	2002-10-09	Yoyogi First Gym, Tokyo, Japan	
9	Win	9–0	Wele Maqolo	KO	4 (6)	2002-08-10	Plages du Prado, France	
8	Win	8–0	Juan Herrera	TKO	3 (6)	2002-05-23	Palais des Sports, Levallois-Perret, France	
7	Win	7–0	Marcos Ramon Obregon	UD	8 (8)	2002-02-23	Palais des Sports, Marseille, France	
6	Win	6–0	Rodolfo Blanco	PTS	6 (6)	2001-12-22	Zénith d'Orléans, Orléans, France	
5	Win	5–0	Mercurio Ciaramitaro	UD	6 (6)	2001-10-08	Palais des Sports, Paris, France	
4	Win	4–0	Javier Ortiz	PTS	6 (6)	2001-08-04	Plages du Prado, France	
3	Win	3–0	Victor Martinez	KO	3 (6)	2001-05-14	Palais des Sports, Paris, France	
2	Win	2–0	Kenny Berrios	TKO	6 (6)	2001-03-12	Palais des Sports, Paris, France	
1	Win	1–0	Aneudis Cuevas Pena	TKO	3 (6)	2001-01-29	Palais des Sports, Paris, France	

== See also ==
- List of southpaw stance boxers
- List of world light-flyweight boxing champions

== Notes ==
Sporting positions
Regional boxing titles
Preceded by Christophe Rodrigues	French flyweight champion December 5, 2002 – 2003; Vacated	Vacant Title next held by Alain Bonnel
Preceded by Steffen Norskov	WBA Inter-Continental flyweight champion July 4, 2003 – December 8, 2007; Won world title	Vacant Title next held by Kōki Kameda
Vacant Title last held by Giuseppe Lagana	WBO Inter-Continental flyweight champion November 14, 2003 – 2007; Vacated	Vacant Title next held by Choi Yo-sam
Vacant Title last held by Aleksandr Makhmutov	European flyweight champion November 14, 2003 – 2005; Vacated	Vacant Title next held by Iván Pozo
World boxing titles
Preceded by Juan Carlos Reveco	WBA light-flyweight champion December 8, 2007 – July 18, 2008; Status changed	Succeeded by Giovani Segura promoted from interim status
Honorary boxing titles
New title	WBA light-flyweight champion Champion in recess July 18, 2008 – September 6, 2009; Retired	Vacant Title next held by René Santiago
