= Boxing at the 2006 South American Games =

Boxing competitions

The Boxing Tournament at the 2006 South American Games was held in Buenos Aires, Argentina from November 10 to November 15. 0

== Medal winners ==
EVENT	GOLD	SILVER	BRONZE
Light Flyweight (– 48 kilograms)	Patricio Calero (ECU)	Eduard Bermúdez (VEN)	Oscar Negrete (COL); Paulo Carvalho (BRA)
Flyweight (– 51 kilograms)	William Urina (COL)	Juan Vega (ECU)	Helder Gonzaga (BRA); Roberto Rojas (ARG)
Bantamweight (– 54 kilograms)	Héctor Manzanilla (VEN)	Óscar Escandón (COL)	Maximiliano Márquez (ARG); Hurtado Cruz (BOL)
Featherweight (– 57 kilograms)	Jesus Cuellar (ARG)	Alex Santos (BRA)	Ángel Rodríguez (VEN); Miguel Angel Marriaga (COL)
Lightweight (– 60 kilograms)	Darley Perez (COL)	Everton Lopes (BRA)	Luis Rueda (ARG); Victor Hugo Torres (BOL)
Light Welterweight (– 64 kilograms)	Myke Carvalho (BRA)	Gumersindo Carrasco (ARG)	Janer Gonzalez (COL); Luis Romero (VEN)
Welterweight (– 69 kilograms)	Jaime Cortez (ECU)	Diego Gabriel Cháves (ARG)	Pablo Ramírez Acuña (PAR); Jean Carlos Prada (VEN)
Middleweight (– 75 kilograms)	Alfonso Blanco (VEN)	Carlos Góngora (ECU)	Ezequiel Maderna (ARG); Pedro Calla (PER)
Light Heavyweight (– 81 kilograms)	Eleider Alvarez (COL)	Hamilton Ventura (BRA)	Wualfredo Rivero (VEN); Julio Castillo (ECU)
Heavyweight (– 91 kilograms)	José Payares (VEN)	Rafael Lima (BRA)	Evan Need (ARU); Francisco de Ezcurra (ARG)
Super Heavyweight (+ 91 kilograms)	Antônio Rogério Nogueira (BRA)	Marcelo Ponce (ARG)	—
