= Freeman Smith =

Freeman Smith may refer to:

- Freeman Smith (boxer) in 2nd AIBA American 2004 Olympic Qualifying Tournament
- Freeman Smith, character in All the Right Moves (film)

== See also ==
- Robert Freeman Smith, politician
