= Alexander Espinoza =

Venezuelan boxer (born 1980)

Personal information
- Full name: Alexander Espinoza Hernández
- Nationality: Venezuela
- Born: December 22, 1980 (age 45) Caracas, Distrito Capital
- Height: 1.64 m (5 ft 5 in)
- Weight: 54 kg (119 lb)

Sport
- Sport: Boxing
- Weight class: Bantamweight
Medal record
Central American and Caribbean Games
Bronze medal – third place	2002 San Salvador	Bantamweight
South American Games
Gold medal – first place	2002 Belém	Bantamweight

Alexander Espinoza Hernández (born December 27, 1980) is a bantamweight boxer from Venezuela, who represented his native country at the 2004 Summer Olympics in Athens, Greece. He qualified for the Olympic Games by ending up in second place at the 2nd AIBA American 2004 Olympic Qualifying Tournament in Rio de Janeiro, Brazil. He won the bronze medal in the men's bantamweight division (– 54 kg) at the 2002 Central American and Caribbean Games in El Salvador. In 2016 in a professional boxing bout, Espinoza was defeated by Filipino prospect Genesis Servania in Japan.

== Amateur results ==
=== 2002 South American Games ===
- Defeated Ceferino Labarda (Argentina) 20:10

=== 2002 Central American and Caribbean Games ===
- 1st round bye
- Defeated Carlos Guevara (Nicaragua) 24:15
- Lost to Johnny Perez (Colombia) 19:23

=== 2004 Summer Olympics ===
- 1st round bye
- Lost to Andrew Kooner (Canada) 20:37

== Pro career ==
Espinoza made his professional debut on 2005-03-05.
