= Zoltan Lunka =

German boxer

Personal information
- Full name: Zoltan Lunka
- Nationality: German, Romanian
- Born: 22 May 1970 (age 56) Miercurea Nirajului, Mureş, Romania
- Height: 1.60 m (5 ft 3 in)
- Weight: 54 kg (119 lb)

Sport
- Sport: Boxing
- Weight class: Flyweight
- Club: Sportverein Halle
Medal record
Representing Germany
Olympic Games
| Bronze medal – third place | 1996 Atlanta | Flyweight |
World Amateur Championships
| Gold medal – first place | 1995 Berlin | Flyweight |

Zoltan Lunka (born 22 May 1970 in Miercurea Nirajului, Romania) is a professional boxer, who won a Flyweight bronze medal at the 1996 Summer Olympics for Germany. A year earlier, at the 1995 World Amateur Boxing Championships in Berlin, he captured the world title.

== Olympic results ==
- Defeated Martín Castillo (Mexico) 13–7
- Defeated Hermensen Ballo (Indonesia) 18–12
- Defeated Mehdi Assous (Algeria) 19–6
- Lost to Bulat Jumadilov (Kazakhstan) 18–23

== Pro career ==
Lunka turned pro in 1996, losing his only notable fight, against WBO Flyweight Title holder Fernando Montiel. Montiel won by TKO in the 7th. Lunka retired after the bout with a record of 21–2–0.
