= 2nd AIBA American 2004 Olympic Qualifying Tournament =

The 2nd AIBA American 2004 Olympic Boxing Qualifying Tournament was held in Rio de Janeiro, Brazil from April 4 to April 11, 2004. The competition was the final opportunity for amateur boxers from North-, Central- and South America to qualify for the 2004 Summer Olympics (the only other places were already allocated at the 2003 Pan American Games). The top two boxers in each weight division gained a place in the Olympics, with the exception of the heavyweight and super heavyweight divisions in which just the winner was entered.

== Medal winners ==
Event	Gold	Silver	Bronze
Light Flyweight (– 48 kilograms)	Miguel Ángel Miranda (VEN)	Patricio Calero (ECU)	McWilliams Arroyo (PUR) Sébastien Gauthier (CAN)
Flyweight (– 51 kilograms)	Óscar Escandón (COL)	Jonny Mendoza (VEN)	Javier Chacón (ARG) Tyson Cave (CAN)
Bantamweight (– 54 kilograms)	Argenis Mendez (DOM)	Alexander Espinoza (VEN)	Roberto Benitez (USA) Jhonny Perez (COL)
Featherweight (– 57 kilograms)	Benoît Gaudet (CAN)	Edvaldo Oliveira (BRA)	Freddy Barbosa (VEN) Daniel Brizuela (ARG)
Lightweight (– 60 kilograms)	Myke Carvalho (BRA)	José David Mosquera (COL)	Francisco Vargas (MEX) Jonathan Maicelo (PER)
Light Welterweight (– 64 kilograms)	Yudel Jhonson (CUB)	Rock Allen (USA)	Kennis Joseph (GRN) Marcos Maidana (ARG)
Welterweight (– 69 kilograms)	Juan Camilo Novoa (COL)	Jean Carlos Prada (VEN)	Euris González (DOM) Taureano Johnson (BAH)
Middleweight (– 75 kilograms)	Jean Pascal (CAN)	Glaucelio Abreu (BRA)	Cruz Gil (VEN) Alexander Brand (COL)
Light Heavyweight (– 81 kilograms)	Washington Silva (BRA)	Trevor Stewardson (CAN)	Terry Shawn Cox (BAR) Julio Domínguez (ARG)
Heavyweight (– 91 kilograms)	Wilmer Vasquez (VEN)	Jason Douglas (CAN)	Kertson Manswell (TRI) Geraldo Bisbal (PUR)
Super Heavyweight (+ 91 kilograms)	Victor Bisbal (PUR)	George García (MEX)	Freeman Smith (BER) Fabiano Astorino (BRA)

== Qualified ==
=== Light Flyweight (– 48 kg) ===
- Miguel Ángel Miranda (VEN)
- Patricio Calero (ECU)

=== Flyweight (– 51 kg) ===
- Óscar Escandón (COL)
- Jonny Mendoza (VEN)

=== Bantamweight (– 54 kg) ===
- Argenis Mendez (DOM)
- Alexander Espinoza (VEN)

=== Featherweight (– 57 kg) ===
- Benoît Gaudet (CAN)
- Edvaldo Oliveira (BRA)

=== Lightweight (– 60 kg) ===
- Myke Carvalho (BRA)
- José David Mosquera (COL)

=== Light Welterweight (– 64 kg) ===
- Juan de Dios Navarro (MEX)
- Alessandro Matos (BRA)

=== Welterweight (– 69 kg) ===
- Juan Camilo Novoa (COL)
- Jean Carlos Prada (VEN)

=== Middleweight (– 75 kg) ===
- Jean Pascal (CAN)
- Glaucelio Abreu (BRA)

=== Light Heavyweight (– 81 kg) ===
- Washington Silva (BRA)
- Trevor Stewardson (CAN)

=== Heavyweight (– 91 kg) ===
- Wilmer Vasquez (VEN)

=== Super Heavyweight (+ 91 kg) ===
- Victor Bisbal (PUR)

== See also ==
- Boxing at the 2003 Pan American Games
- 1st AIBA American 2004 Olympic Qualifying Tournament
