= Bulat Zhumadilov =

Kazakhstani boxer (born 1973)

Personal information
- Full name: Болат Жумадилов
- Nationality: Kazakhstan
- Born: April 22, 1973 (age 53) Taraz, Kazakh SSR, Soviet Union
- Height: 1.64 m (5 ft 5 in)
- Weight: 51 kg (112 lb)

Sport
- Sport: Boxing
- Weight class: Flyweight
Medal record
Olympic Games
Silver medal – second place	1996 Atlanta	Flyweight
Silver medal – second place	2000 Sydney	Flyweight
World Amateur Championships
Gold medal – first place	1999 Houston	Flyweight
Silver medal – second place	1995 Berlin	Flyweight
Bronze medal – third place	1997 Budapest	Flyweight
Asian Amateur Boxing Championships
Gold medal – first place	1994 Tehran	Light Flyweight
Gold medal – first place	1995 Tashkent	Flyweight
Bronze medal – third place	1999 Tashkent	Flyweight

Bolat Zhumadilov (Болат Жумадилов; born April 22, 1973) is a Kazakh boxer who competed in the Men's Flyweight (– 51 kg) at the 1996 and 2000 Summer Olympics and won silver medals on both occasions. He won the world title at the 1999 World Amateur Boxing Championships in Houston, Texas, United States.

== Olympic results ==
1996

- Defeated Vladislav Neiman (Israel) 18–7
- Defeated Serhiy Kovganko (Ukraine) 21–4
- Defeated Damaen Kelly (Ireland) 13–6
- Defeated Zoltan Lunka (Germany) 23–18
- Lost to Maikro Romero (Cuba) 11–12

2000

- 1st round bye
- Defeated Kennedy Kenyanta (Zambia) 12–9
- Defeated Vic Darchinyan (Armenia) 15–8
- Defeated Jérôme Thomas (France) 22–16
- Lost to Wijan Ponlid (Thailand) 12-19
