= Mark Simmons (boxer) =

Canadian boxer (born 1974)

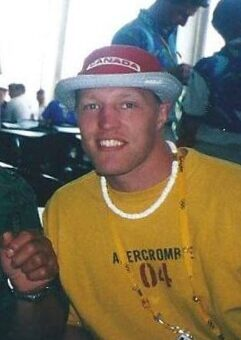
- Mark Simmons at the 2000 Summer Olympics

Personal information
- Born: 23 May 1974 (age 52) Toronto, Ontario, Canada
- Height: 1.91 m (6 ft 3 in)
- Weight: 91 kg (201 lb)

Sport
- Sport: Boxing
- Weight class: Heavyweight
Medal record
Men's amateur boxing
Representing Canada
Commonwealth Games
Gold medal – first place	1998 Kuala Lumpur	Heavyweight
Pan American Games
Silver medal – second place	1999 Winnipeg	Heavyweight

Mark Simmons (born May 23, 1974) is a professional boxing referee and a former 4 time Canadian senior National Champion, who boxed in the heavyweight division at the 2000 Summer Olympics in Sydney, Australia. As an amateur boxer, he had a record of 201 wins in 241 recorded bouts.

== Boxing career ==
Born in Toronto, Ontario, Simmons first began training at the Toronto Newsboys Boxing Club in Toronto, Ontario in 1979. He was a member of the Canadian National Boxing Team travelling to over 20 countries from 1993 to 2000. In 1996, Simmons was the Canadian Olympic alternate in the 91 kg weight division to David Defiagbon (1996 Atlanta, Olympics, Silver medalist). In 1995, Simmons won the Detroit Golden Gloves in the 91 kg Heavyweight division when Canadians were still allowed to compete at the US Golden Glove Championships. He would then represent Detroit competing at the 1995 National Golden Gloves in Lowell, Mass winning his first two bouts, losing in the quarter-finals. At the 1997 World Championships in Budapest, Hungary, he defeated Macedonia via a first round knock out, then won a decision on points 18-10 over USA's Davaryll Williamson and lost in the quarter-finals on points, 15-4 to Cuba's Félix Savón, who has been regarded as one of the world's greatest amateur boxers. In 1997, AIBA ranked Mark Simmons the 5th best boxer in the 91 kg division in the world. In 1997, Simmons won a silver medal at the Francophone games in Antananarivo, Madagascar with a first round knock out over Madagascar in the first fight, a second-round decision victory over France and a 14-15 loss to Cameroon in the final. At the 1998 Commonwealth Games in Kuala Lumpur, Malaysia, Simmons won the gold medal in the 91 kg heavyweight division with victories over Ghana, Wales, and the Seychelles. At the 1999 Pan American Games in Winnipeg, Manitoba, Simmons defeated Jamaica in the quarter-finals, USA in the semi-final, and lost to Odlanier Solís of Cuba in the final by a 4-2 score, taking home the silver medal, despite boxing with a broken hand. As a result of his broken hand suffered while competing at the Pan Am Games, Simmons was unable to participate in the 1999 World Championships that took place two weeks later.

With 16 countries competing, Simmons qualified 1 of only 2 spots by winning a Gold medal in the 91 kg heavyweight division at the 2000 Olympic Qualification tournament in Tijuana, Mexico with victories over Venezuela, Jamaica, and Puerto Rico.

At the 2000 Summer Olympics Simmons defeated Iran's Rouhollah Hosseini in the round of 16 by a score of 11–6, once again suffering a broken hand in this bout. Simmons then lost the guaranteed bronze medal match to Germany's Sebastian Köber in the quarterfinal.

On Saturday May 31st 2025, Mark Simmons was inducted into the Boxing Canada Hall of Fame along with Russ Anber, Jean Pascal, Jean Francois Bergeron, and Benoit Gaudet.

== Personal life ==
Simmons has also appeared in movies, including Rocky Marciano, Phantom Punch and Cinderella Man, and Flint Strong. In Cinderella Man, Simmons played 1930s heavyweight boxer Art Lasky, and was also the stunt double for Craig Bierko, who played Max Baer.

In 2011, Simmons joined the Ontario Athletic Commission as a professional boxing referee and judge.
