= England Boxing National Amateur Championships Light-Middleweight Champions =

English Boxing competition

England Boxing National Amateur Championships Light-Middleweight Champions (U70kg)
- Genre: [Boxing]
- Inaugurated: 1951
- Organiser: England Boxing

The England Boxing National Amateur Championships Light-Middleweight Championship formerly known as the ABA Championships is the primary English amateur boxing championship. It had previously been contested by all the nations of the United Kingdom.

== History ==
The light-middleweight division was inaugurated in 1951 but was not contested from 2005 to 2009 and from 2014 to 2021 following a re-organisation of weight categories in 2010 and 2014 respectively. Yet another weight re-organisation in 2022 resulted in the category returning as an under 70 kg division. The championships are highly regarded in the boxing world and seen as the most prestigious national amateur championships.

== Past winners ==
Year	Winner	Club
1951	Alf Lay	Battersea ABC
1952	Bernard Foster	Mitchell & Butlers ABC
1953	Cpl. Bruce Wells	Royal Air Force
1954	Cpl. Bruce Wells	Royal Air Force
1955	Bernard Foster	Mitchell & Butlers ABC
1956	John McCormack	NB Loco ABC
1957	Johnny Cunningham	Royal Air Force
1958	Stuart Pearson	Plant Works ABC
1959	Stuart Pearson	Plant Works ABC
1960	Willie Fisher	Craigneuk ABC
1961	Johnny Gamble	Dowlais ABC
1962	Jimmy Lloyd	Army
1963	Andrew Wyper	Witchknowe ABC
1964	Bill Robinson	Stock Exchange ABC
1965	Pat Dwyer	Maple Leaf ABC
1966	Tom Imrie	Bucchleuch ABC
1967	Alan Edwards	Worcester ABC
1968	Eric Blake	Battersea ABC
1969	Tom Imrie	Bucchleuch ABC
1970	Dave Simmonds	Gloucester ABC
1971	Alan Edwards	Worcester City ABC
1972	Larry Paul	Shrewsbury ABC
1973	Roger Maxwell	Army
1974	Roger Maxwell	Army
1975	Cy Harrison	Denbeath ABC
1976	William Lauder	McTaggart ABC
1977	Charlie Malarkey	Clydeview ABC
1978	Earl Henderson	Reading ABC
1979	Darwin Brewster	Roath Youth ABC
1980	Jimmy Price	Holy Name ABC
1981	Errol Christie	Standard Triumph ABC
1982	David Milligan	Denbeath BC
1983	Rod Douglas	St. Georges ABC
1984	Rod Douglas	St. Georges ABC
1985	Rod Douglas	St. Georges ABC
1986	Anthony Velinor	Army
1987	Neville Brown	Burton ABC
1988	Wayne Ellis	Cardiff YMCA BC
1989	Neville Brown	Burton ABC
1990	Timothy Taylor	Repton ABC
1991	Timothy Taylor	Repton ABC
1992	Joe Calzaghe	Newbridge ABC
1993	David Starie	Hurstlea & Kurridge ABC
1994	Wayne Alexander	Lynn ABC
1995	Chris Bessey	Army
1996	Scott Dann	Mayflower ABC
1997	Chris Bessey	Army
1998	Chris Bessey	Army
1999	Chris Bessey	Army
2000	Chris Bessey	Army
2001	Matthew Thirlwall	Fisher ABC
2002	Paul Smith	Rotunda ABC
2003	Vin Raj	Leicester Youth ABC
2004	Dan Guthrie	Yeovil & Reckleford ABC
2005–2009	not held	
2010	Antony Fowler	Golden Gloves ABC
2011	James Metcalf	Salisbury ABC
2012	Kelvin Fawaz	All Stars ABC
2013	Scott Fitzgerald	Larches and Savick ABC
2022	Ted Jackson	St Paul's
2023	Callum Makin	Rotunda
2024	Callum Makin	Rotunda
2025	Daniel Stoican	Sneinton
2026	Kai Battista	Kenton
