= Dilshod Yuldashev =

Uzbekistani boxer

Personal information
- Nationality: Uzbekistani
- Born: 29 January 1976 (age 49)

Sport
- Sport: Boxing

Dilshod Yuldashev (born 29 January 1976) is an Uzbekistani boxer. He competed in the men's light flyweight event at the 2000 Summer Olympics.
