= Gary Jones (boxer) =

Retired boxer who competed for England

Personal information
- Nationality: England
- Born: 1975 (age 50–51) Liverpool

Sport
- Club: Sefton ABC / Towerhill ABC
Medal record
Boxing
Representing England
Commonwealth Games
Bronze medal – third place	1998 Kuala Lumpur	light flyweight

Gary Jones (born 1975) is a male retired boxer who competed for England.

== Boxing career ==
Jones was a double English National Champion in 1994 and 1999 after winning the prestigious ABA light flyweight title, boxing out of the Sefton ABC and then Towerhill ABC.

He represented England in the light flyweight (-48 kg) division and won a bronze medal, at the 1998 Commonwealth Games in Kuala Lumpur, Malaysia.

He also won the Scottish ABA title and turned professional in 2003.
