= Kim Un-chol =

North Korean boxer (born 1979)

Personal information
- Born: September 23, 1979 (age 46)

Sport
- Sport: Boxing

Deputy of the Supreme People's Assembly from the 12th constituency
- Incumbent
- Assumed office 21 March 2026
- Preceded by: Kil Kum-sun

Korean name
- Hangul: 김은철
- RR: Gim Euncheol
- MR: Kim Ŭnch'ŏl
Medal record
Men's boxing
Representing North Korea
Olympic Games
Bronze medal – third place	2000 Sydney	Light flyweight

Kim Un-chol (Korean: 김은철; born September 23, 1979) is a North Korean boxer and politician who competed in the light flyweight (– 48 kg) division at the 2000 Summer Olympics and won the bronze medal. Later on, in the 2026 North Korean parliamentary election, he was elected to represent the 12th constituency in the Supreme People's Assembly.

== Olympic results ==
- Defeated Sebusiso Keketsi (Lesotho) RSC 4
- Defeated Pál Lakatos (Hungary) 20-8
- Defeated Ivanas Stapovičius (Lithuania) 22-10
- Lost to Rafael Lozano (Spain) 10-15
