= Khaled Falah =

Syrian boxer

Personal information
- Nationality: Syrian
- Born: 4 April 1972 (age 53)

Sport
- Sport: Boxing

Khaled Falah (Arabic: خالد فلاح; born 4 April 1972) is a Syrian boxer. He competed in the men's flyweight event at the 1996 Summer Olympics.
