= Scott MacIntosh =

Canadian boxer

Personal information
- Born: 24 August 1973 (age 52) Sydney, Nova Scotia, Canada

Sport
- Sport: Boxing
Medal record
Representing Canada
Commonwealth Games
| Silver medal – second place | 1998 Kuala Lumpur | Light middleweight |
Pan American Games
| Silver medal – second place | 1999 Winnipeg | Light middleweight |

Scott MacIntosh (born 24 August 1973) is a Canadian boxer. He competed in the men's light middleweight event at the 2000 Summer Olympics.
