= Howard Gereo =

Papua New Guinean boxer

Personal information
- Nationality: Papua New Guinean
- Born: 18 April 1978 (age 46)

Sport
- Sport: Boxing

Howard Gereo (born 18 April 1978) is a Papua New Guinean boxer. He competed in the men's flyweight event at the 1996 Summer Olympics. He also won a gold medal at the 1997 Arafura Games.
