= Andrew McLean (boxer) =

Retired boxer who competed for England

Personal information
- Nationality: England
- Born: 13 January 1976 (age 50) Durham

Sport
- Club: Birtley ABC
Medal record
Boxing
Representing England
Commonwealth Games
Bronze medal – third place	1998 Kuala Lumpur	lightweight

Andrew John McLean (born 1976) is a male retired boxer who competed for England.

== Boxing career ==
McLean was a double English National Champion in 1998 and 2000 after winning the prestigious ABA lightweight title, boxing out of the Birtley ABC.

He represented England in the lightweight (-60 kg) division and won a bronze medal, at the 1998 Commonwealth Games in Kuala Lumpur, Malaysia.

He turned professional on 17 March 2001.
