= Washington Silva (boxer) =

Brazilian boxer (born 1976)

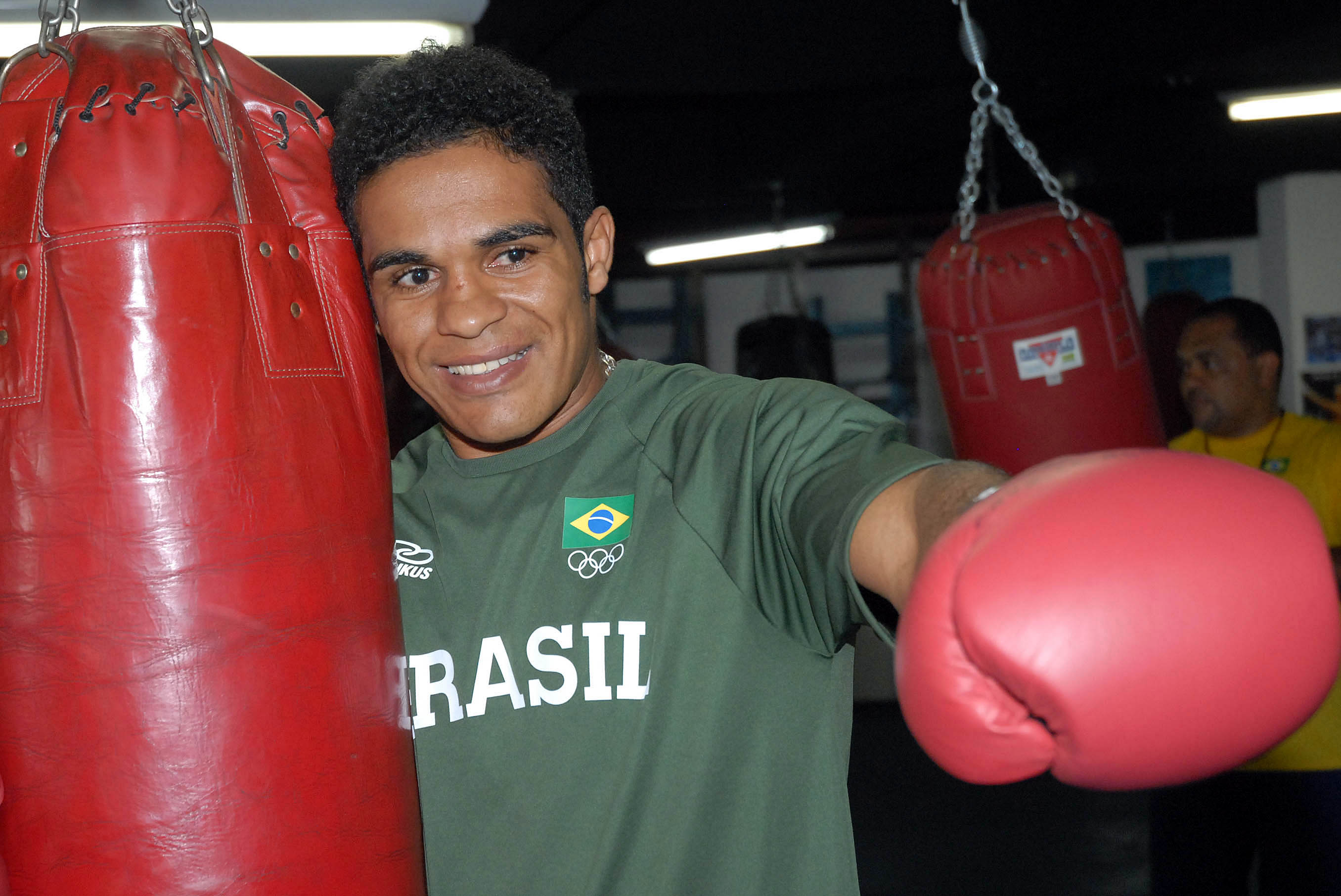

Medal record

Men's Boxing

Representing Brazil

South American Games
Gold medal – first place	2002 Belém	Light Heavyweight
Bronze medal – third place	2010 Medellín	81 kg

Washington Luís da Silva (born February 25, 1976, in Diadema, São Paulo) is a Brazilian amateur boxer best known to participate in the 2004 Olympics and qualifying for 2008 at light-heavyweight. He is the uncle of Hamilton Ventura but only five years older.

== Career ==
At the 2003 PanAm Games he lost to Argenis Casimiro Núñez. He qualified for the Olympic Games by ending up in first place at the 2nd AIBA American 2004 Olympic Qualifying Tournament in Rio de Janeiro, Brazil. In Athens, Greece he lost in the first round 22:27 to Ali Ismayilov. Washington Silva shared his light heavyweight titles with another light heavyweight Alexsandro cardoso, won his seat to play international matches, with the passing Alexsandro professional boxing

At the 2005 World Championships he almost medaled when he lost his quarterfinal to Artak Malumyan only on countback. Two years later, at the 2007 Pan American Games in his native Brazil he lost in the quarterfinal to Christopher Downs.

At the 2008 Olympic qualifier in Trinidad he lost to Puerto Rico's Carlos Negron but upset Christopher Downs for the third qualifying spot. In Beijing he defeated Azea Augustama and Bastir Samir then he was shut out by Irish Kenneth Egan.
