= Souleymane M'baye =

French boxer

Personal information
- Nickname: The Sensation
- Born: March 21, 1975 (age 51) Clichy, Hauts-de-Seine, France
- Height: 5 ft 9 1/2 in (177 cm)
- Weight: Light welterweight; Welterweight

Boxing career
- Reach: 70 in (178 cm)
- Stance: Orthodox

Boxing record
- Total fights: 49
- Wins: 42
- Win by KO: 23
- Losses: 6
- Draws: 1

Souleymane M'baye (born March 21, 1975) is a French professional boxer and is the former WBA super-lightweight champion.

== Professional career ==
He won the vacated title by a fourth technical knockout on September 2, 2006 against Raul Horacio Balbi. He lost the title to British contender Gavin Rees. On May 28, M'baye defeated Antonin Décarie by unanimous decision to capture the WBA Interim welterweight title.

== Professional boxing record ==
49 fights	42 wins	6 losses
By knockout	23	2
By decision	19	4
Draws	1	

No.	Result	Record	Opponent	Type	Round, time	Date	Location	Notes
49	Loss	42–6–1	Karim Aliliche	SD	10 (10)	2017-06-10	Centre international de Deauville, Deauville, France	For French welterweight title
48	Win	42–5–1	Krzysztof Szot	PTS	8 (8)	2016-10-22	Casino de Deauville, Deauville, France	
47	Win	41–5–1	Alexandre Lepelley	SD	6 (6)	2016-03-26	Casino de Deauville, Deauville, France	
46	Loss	40–5–1	Khabib Allakhverdiev	TKO	11 (12)	2013-07-13	Salle des Étoiles, Monte Carlo, Monaco	For WBA (Regular) & IBO light-welterweight titles
45	Win	40–4–1	Laszlo Haaz	TKO	2 (10)	2013-03-21	Gentlemen Fight Club Boxing House, Budapest, Hungary	
44	Loss	39–4–1	Ismael El Massoudi	TKO	12 (12)	2011-07-14	Place Jemaa el-Fnaa, Marrakesh, Morocco	Lost interim WBA welterweight title
43	Win	39–3–1	Antonin Décarie	UD	12 (12)	2010-05-28	Palais Marcel Cerdan, Levallois-Perret, France	Won interim WBA welterweight title
42	Win	38–3–1	Colin Lynes	SD	12 (12)	2009-07-03	Palais Marcel Cerdan, Levallois-Perret, France	Won vacant European light-welterweight title
41	Win	37–3–1	Barrie Jones	PTS	8 (8)	2008-12-06	ExCeL Arena, London, England, U.K.	
40	Loss	36–3–1	Herman Ngoudjo	UD	12 (12)	2008-06-06	Uniprix Stadium, Montreal, Quebec, Canada	
39	Win	36–2–1	Ammeth Diaz	TKO	4 (12)	10 Nov 2007	Palais Marcel Cerdan, Levallois-Perret, France	
38	Loss	35–2–1	Gavin Rees	UD	12 (12)	2007-07-21	Cardiff International Arena, Cardiff, Wales, U.K.	Lost WBA light-welterweight title
37	Draw	35–1–1	Andreas Kotelnik	SD	12 (12)	2007-03-10	Olympia, Liverpool, England, U.K.	Retained WBA light-welterweight title
36	Win	35–1	Raúl Horacio Balbi	TKO	4 (12)	2006-09-02	Bolton Arena, Bolton, England, U.K.	Won vacant WBA light-welterweight title
35	Win	34–1	Laszlo Komjathi	RTD	4 (8)	2006-07-08	Millennium Stadium, Cardiff, Wales, U.K.	
34	Win	33–1	Oscar Milkitas	TKO	6 (8)	2005-12-10	ExCeL Arena, London, England, U.K.	
33	Win	32–1	Joseph Walter Leichnig	TKO	3 (8)	2005-06-25	Futuroscope, Chasseneuil-du-Poitou, France	
32	Win	31–1	Ivan Orlando Bustos	TKO	5 (8)	2005-03-14	Palais des Sports, Paris, France	
31	Win	30–1	Andreas Kotelnik	SD	12 (12)	2004-10-21	Palais Marcel Cerdan, Levallois-Perret, France	
30	Win	29–1	Marian Leondraliu	TKO	3 (8)	2004-07-10	La Palestre, Le Cannet, France	
29	Win	28–1	Walter Fabian Saporiti	PTS	8 (8)	2004-04-29	Palais Marcel Cerdan, Levallois-Perret, France	
28	Loss	27–1	Vivian Harris	UD	12 (12)	2003-07-12	The Orleans, Paradise, Nevada, U.S.	For WBA (Regular) light-welterweight title
27	Win	27–0	Adam Zadworny	TKO	3 (8)	2002-12-21	Lausitz Arena, Cottbus, Germany	
26	Win	26–0	Khalid Rahilou	UD	12 (12)	2002-05-23	Palais Marcel Cerdan, Levallois-Perret, France	Won WBA Inter-Continental light-welterweight title
25	Win	25–0	Colin Mayisela	UD	8 (8)	2002-04-09	Vannes, France	
24	Win	24–0	Juergen Haeck	TKO	2 (10)	2002-01-22	Gdynia, Poland	Won vacant EBU EU light-welterweight title
23	Win	23–0	Ahmed Merichiche	PTS	8 (8)	2001-11-24	Salle Louis Simon, Gaillard, France	
22	Win	22–0	Frederic Tripp	MD	10 (10)	2001-10-16	Saint-Avé, France	
21	Win	21–0	Carlos Fernandes	TKO	10 (10)	2001-06-19	Chorzów, Poland	
20	Win	20–0	Nordine Mouchi	SD	10 (10)	2001-04-24	Levallois-Perret, France	Won vacant French light-welterweight title
19	Win	19–0	Ashley Whiteboy	TKO	4 (8)	2001-02-20	Ice Hall, Helsinki, Finland	
18	Win	18–0	Mikhail Boyarskikh	TKO	9 (10)	2001-01-09	Palais Marcel Cerdan, Levallois-Perret, France	
17	Win	17–0	Cyril Terrones	TKO	6 (10)	2000-12-05	Maritim Hotel, Magdeburg, Germany	
16	Win	16–0	Douglas Villarreal	KO	5 (10)	2000-10-13	Aarhus Stadionhal, Aarhus, Denmark	
15	Win	15–0	Óscar Palomino	PTS	8 (8)	2000-06-27	Telde, Spain	
14	Win	14–0	Kimoun Kouassi	PTS	8 (8)	2000-05-23	Levallois-Perret, France	
13	Win	13–0	Vasile Surcica	TKO	6 (10)	2000-03-21	Telde, Spain	
12	Win	12–0	Tommy Peacock	TD	5 (10)	2000-02-01	Paris, France	
11	Win	11–0	Monji Abdou	PTS	8 (8)	1999-12-17	La Cubierta, Leganés, Spain	
10	Win	10–0	Alan Temple	RTD	7 (8)	1999-11-02	Pabellón Cecilio Alonso, Malagón, Spain	
9	Win	9–0	Rene Prins	KO	2 (8)	1999-09-28	Vigo, Spain	
8	Win	8–0	Jozef Kubovsky	TKO	3 (6)	1999-07-09	Vigo, Spain	
7	Win	7–0	Christophe Carlier	PTS	6 (6)	1999-06-12	Saint-Avé, France	
6	Win	6–0	Claudiu Rata	KO	2 (6)	1999-06-01	Levallois-Perret, France	
5	Win	5–0	Craig Smith	KO	1 (6)	1999-04-30	Pabellón Príncipe Felipe, Ciudad Real, Spain	
4	Win	4–0	Jean Louis Cognata	KO	3 (6)	1999-03-30	Levallois-Perret, France	
3	Win	3–0	Juan Carlos Martinez	TD	5 (6)	1999-03-13	Saint-Nazaire, France	
2	Win	2–0	Samir Berbachi	PTS	6 (6)	1999-02-05	Levallois-Perret, France	
1	Win	1–0	Laszlo Porteleki	KO	3 (6)	1998-11-17	Aarhus Stadionhal, Aarhus, Denmark	

== See also ==
- List of world light-welterweight boxing champions

Sporting positions
Regional boxing titles
Vacant Title last held by Frederic Noto	French light-welterweight champion April 24, 2001 – January 22, 2002; Won EU title	Vacant Title next held by Fabrice Colombel
New title	EBU European Union light-welterweight champion January 22, 2002 – 2002; Vacated	Vacant Title next held by Juergen Haeck
Preceded by Khalid Rahilou	WBA Inter-Continental light-welterweight champion May 23, 2002 – 2002; Vacated	Vacant Title next held by Andreas Kotelnik
Vacant Title last held by Gianluca Branco	European light-welterweight champion July 3, 2009 – 2009; Vacated	Vacant Title next held by Paul McCloskey
World boxing titles
Vacant Title last held by Carlos Maussa	WBA light-welterweight champion September 2, 2006 – July 21, 2007	Succeeded by Gavin Rees
Vacant Title last held by Yuriy Nuzhnenko	WBA welterweight champion Interim title May 28, 2010 – July 14, 2011	Succeeded by Ismael El Massoudi
