= Carlos Luis Campos =

Venezuelan boxer (born 1980)

Personal information
- Born: 27 September 1980 (age 45)
Medal record
Men's Boxing
Representing Venezuela
Central American and Caribbean Games
Bronze medal – third place	2002 San Salvador	Light Flyweight
South American Games
Silver medal – second place	2002 Belém	Light Flyweight

Carlos Luis Campos (born 27 September 1980 in Guco) is a light flyweight boxer from Venezuela, who won the bronze medal in the men's light flyweight division (– 48 kg) at the 2002 Central American and Caribbean Games in El Salvador. He made his professional debut on 18 April 2004.
