= Jitender Kumar (boxer, born 1977) =

Indian boxer

Personal information
- Born: 4 September 1977 (age 48) Sisar Khas, Rohtak, Haryana, India
- Height: 171 cm (5 ft 7 in)

Sport
- Sport: Boxing
- Weight class: Middleweight
Medal record
Men's Boxing
Representing India
Commonwealth Games
Silver medal – second place	1998 Kuala Lumpur	Middleweight
Bronze medal – third place	2002 Manchester	Middleweight

Jitender Kumar (born 4 September 1977) is an Indian boxer who has medaled twice at Commonwealth Games and represented India in both the 2000 and 2004 Olympic Games.

== Biography ==
Jitender Kumar hails from Bhiwani, Haryana. He was trained at Sports Authority of India facility in Bhiwani under coach Jagdish Singh.

== Career ==
Kumar represented India at two consecutive Summer Olympics, starting with the middleweight category in the 2000 Olympic Games. At the 1998 Commonwealth Games he lost to John Pearce in the finals. In the 2002 commonwealth games, he lost to Oscar Williamson in the semi-finals. In the national circuit, he fought in the heavyweight category as well. He was awarded the Arjuna award in 1999. Kumar qualified for the 2004 Athens Games by ending up in second place at the 1st AIBA Asian 2004 Olympic Qualifying Tournament in Guangzhou, China. In the final he lost to South Korea's Song Hak-Seong.
