= Maikro Romero =

Cuban boxer (born 1972)

Personal information
- Full name: Maikro Eusebio Romero Esquivel
- Nationality: Cuban
- Born: December 9, 1972 (age 53) Guantánamo
- Height: 1.65 m (5 ft 5 in)
- Weight: 48 kg (106 lb)

Sport
- Sport: Boxing
- Weight class: Light Flyweight and Flyweight
Medal record
Olympic Games
Gold medal – first place	1996 Atlanta	Flyweight
Bronze medal – third place	2000 Sydney	Light Flyweight
World Amateur Championships
Gold medal – first place	1997 Budapest	Light Flyweight
Silver medal – second place	1999 Houston	Light Flyweight
Pan American Games
Gold medal – first place	1999 Winnipeg	Light Flyweight
Central American and Caribbean Games
Gold medal – first place	1998 Maracaibo	Light Flyweight
Bronze medal – third place	1993 Ponce	Light Flyweight
Goodwill Games
Gold medal – first place	1998 New York	Light Flyweight

Maikro Romero (born December 9, 1972) is a Cuban boxer, who won the gold medal in the Men's Flyweight (– 51 kg) category at the 1996 Summer Olympics in Atlanta.

Later he changed weight class to Light Flyweight (– 48 kg) and won the 1997 World Amateur Boxing Championships. Trying to defend his title in 1999, he lost to Brian Viloria in the final and won a silver medal. At the 2000 Summer Olympics in Sydney he won a bronze medal together with Kim Un-Chol of North Korea.

== Amateur highlights ==
- Two time gold medalist at the Pan American Games (1997, 1999)
- Gold medalist at the 1997 World Amateur Boxing Championships in Budapest
- Four time Cuban National Champion (1992–1995)

== Olympic results ==
1996

- Defeated Eric Morel (United States) 24–12
- Defeated Lernik Papyan (Armenia) 22–6
- Defeated Elias Recaido (Philippines) 18–3
- Defeated Albert Pakeyev (Russia) 12–6
- Defeated Bulat Jumadilov (Kazakhstan) 12–11

2000

- Defeated José Luis Varela (Venezuela) 15–1
- Defeated Marian Velicu (Romania) RSC 4
- Defeated Valeriy Sydorenko (Ukraine) 12–5
- Lost to Brahim Asloum (France) 12-13
