= Danilo Lerio =

Filipino boxer

Personal information
- Nationality: Filipino
- Born: November 15, 1980 (age 45) Matalam, Cotabato, Philippines (now part of Antipas, Cotabato)
- Height: 5 ft 4 in (162 cm)
- Weight: 106 lb (48 kg)

Boxing career
- Weight class: Flyweight
- Stance: Southpaw

Boxing record
- Total fights: 18
- Wins: 15
- Win by KO: 4
- Losses: 2
- Draws: 1

Danilo Salamanca Lerio Jr. (born November 15, 1980) is a retired Filipino professional boxer. He competed in the men's light flyweight event at the 2000 Summer Olympics. He had a southpaw stance.

Leading to the 2000 Summer Olympics in Sydney Lerio was mentored by Cuban coach Raul Liranza. Lerio lost his first and only bout in the Olympics against Rafael Lozano of Spain. His coach was dismissed from his position due to ordering Lerio to mix it up with his opponent despite leading four points with 17 seconds left in the bout.

He later turned pro and was the last Filipino who competed in the Olympics to do until Mark Anthony Barriga in the mid-2010s. As a professional boxer, he and his younger brother Roberto were handled by Todd Makelim. In May 2008, Lerio's record stood at 14-2-1 with four knock-outs following his one-round knockout of Matt Meredith in New South Wales, Australia. Danilo Lerio retired from boxing in 2012.

Lerio also has an elder brother named Arlan who also competed in the 2000 Summer Olympics.

== Professional boxing record ==
18 fights	15 wins	2 losses
By knockout	4	0
By decision	11	2
Draws	1	

No.	Result	Record	Opponent	Type	Round, time	Date	Location	Notes
18	Win	15–2–1	Nuapayak Sakkreerin	TKO	11 (12), 0:46	September 19, 2008	Sweeney's at Scenic Hills, Ingleburn, Australia	Won vacant IBF Australasian flyweight title
17	Win	14–2–1	Matt Meredith	TKO	1 (8), 2:21	May 23, 2008	West Tigers Leagues Club, Leumeah, Australia	
16	Loss	13–2–1	Rocky Fuentes	UD	12	September 30, 2007	Cebu City Waterfront Hotel & Casino, Barangay Lahug, Cebu City, Philippines	For Philippines GAB flyweight title
15	Draw	13–1–1	Lowie Bantigue	TD	4 (12), 0:25	June 1, 2007	Angono Sports Complex, Barangay Mahabang, Angono, Philippines	Vacant Philippines GAB flyweight title at stake; Fight stopped prematurely due to accidental head butts suffered by both boxers
14	win	13–1	Apol Suico	TKO	2 (10), 1:29	March 3, 2007	Rajah Sulayman Park, District of Malate, Manila, Philippines	
13	Win	12–1	Bryan Vicera	TD	5 (10), 2:52	December 9, 2006	Ynares Plaza Gymnasium (Covered Court), Binangonan, Philippines	Fight stopped from a cut on Vicera's eyelid produced from an accidental head-butt
12	Win	11–1	Ryan Maliteg	SD	10	October 8, 2006	West Rambo Sports Complex, Barangay 26, Makati City, Philippines	
11	Win	10–1	Rey Megrino	UD	10	July 22, 2006	Ynarez Plaza Gymnasium (Covered Court), Binangonan, Philippines	
10	Win	9–1	Lowie Bantigue	UD	10	May 20, 2006	Ynarez Plaza Gymnasium (Covered Court), Binangonan, Philippines	
9	Win	8–1	Bert Gawat	SD	10	January 7, 2006	Provincial Capitol Grounds, Cagayan de Oro, Philippines	
8	Win	7–1	Roger Mananquil	TKO	2 (8), 0:38	December 10, 2005	St. Lucia East Mall, Cainta, Philippines	
7	Win	6–1	Renato Nival	SD	6	October 28, 2005	Trece Martires City, Cavite, Philippines	
6	Win	5–1	Philip Parcon	UD	8	November 9, 2003	Cotabato Provincial Gymnasium, Barangay Amas, Kidapawan City, Philippines	
5	Win	4–1	Walter Suaybaguio	UD	8	March 23, 2003	Cotabato Provincial Gymnasium, Barangay Amas, Kidapawan City, Philippines	
4	Loss	3–1	Along Denoy	SD	8	December 21, 2002	Lagao Gym, General Santos City, Philippines	
3	Win	3–0	Larry Unson	UD	6	November 24, 2002	Superdome, Ormoc City, Philippines	
2	Win	2–0	Philip Parcon	UD	4	October 26, 2002	Rizal Memorial Colleges Gym, Davao City, Philippines	
1	Win	1–0	Dodong Zalde	UD	4	September 1, 2002	Kidapawan City Gymnasium, Barangay Amas, Kidapawan City, Philippines	
