= Arson Mapfumo =

Zimbabwean boxer (born 1963)

Personal information
- Nationality: Zimbabwean
- Born: 1 October 1963 (age 61)

Sport
- Sport: Boxing

Arson Mapfumo (born 1 October 1963) is a Zimbabwean boxer. He competed in the men's flyweight event at the 1996 Summer Olympics.
