= William Robinson (boxer) =

British boxer

Bill Robinson
Personal information
- Nationality: British (English)
- Born: 20 February 1936 (age 89)

Sport
- Sport: Boxing

William Robinson (born 20 February 1936) is a British boxer and fought as Bill Robinson. He competed in the men's light middleweight event at the 1964 Summer Olympics. He received a bye in the first round, before being defeated by Nojim Maiyegun of Nigeria in the next round, after the referee stopped the contest.

Robinson won the 1964 Amateur Boxing Association British light-middleweight title and 1965 British middleweight title, when boxing out of the Stock Exchange ABC.
