= Bernard Foster =

British boxer (1931–2014)

Personal information
- Nationality: British (English)
- Born: 28 September 1931 Birmingham, England
- Died: 10 May 2014 (aged 82) Birmingham, England

Sport
- Sport: Boxing

Bernard Foster (28 September 1931 – 10 May 2014) was a British boxer. He competed in the men's light middleweight event at the 1952 Summer Olympics.

Foster won the 1952 and 1955 Amateur Boxing Association British light-middleweight title, when boxing out of the Mitchell & Butlers ABC.

Foster died in Birmingham on 10 May 2014, aged 82.
