= Hamilton Ventura =

Brazilian boxer

Personal information
- Born: 1983 (age 42–43)
Medal record
Men's Boxing
Representing Brazil
South American Games
Silver medal – second place	2006 Buenos Aires	Light Heavyweight

Hamilton Ventura da Conceicao (born 1983 in Cruz das Almas) is a Brazilian amateur boxer best known to win a silver medal at the 2006 South American Games in the men's light heavyweight division.

== Career ==
He only started to box in 2006 but when his uncle, veteran Washington Silva was injured Ventura with a record of 24-0 was sent to the South American Games 2006 he beat Julio Castillo in the semi, in the final he was edged out 16:17 by Eleider Alvarez.

Silva was the Brazilian boxer at the 2007 PanAm Games but at the 2007 Brazilian Championships he became champion by winning every fight inside the distance.

He participated at the second Olympic qualifier at Heavyweight 201 lbs but lost the all-important final to Deivi Julio 0:5 and missed the qualification.

== Professional boxing record ==
24 fights	15 wins	8 losses
By knockout	13	3
By decision	2	5
Draws	1	

No.	Result	Record	Opponent	Type	Round, time	Date	Location	Notes
24	Loss	15–8–1	Mattia Faraoni	PTS	6	1 Jul 2023	Palafijlkam, Ostia, Italy	
23	Loss	15–7–1	Ali Baloyev	UD	6	6 Jul 2019	Barys Arena, Astana, Kazakhstan	
22	Loss	15–6–1	Alexey Egorov	KO	4 (10), 2:27	23 Dec 2018	USC Soviet Wings, Moscow, Russia	
21	Loss	15–5–1	Arsen Goulamirian	KO	3 (10), 2:58	2 Dec 2017	La Palestre, Le Cannet, France	
20	Loss	15–4–1	Imre Szellő	UD	10	17 Sep 2016	Castle of Várpalota, Várpalota, Hungary	For vacant WBO Inter-Continental cruiserweight title
19	Win	15–3–1	Marcos David	KO	1 (8), 1:57	23 Jul 2016	Centro Esportivo Elite, Osasco, Brazil	
18	Loss	14–3–1	Yury Bykhautsou	MD	8	16 Apr 2016	One World Hotel, Petaling Jaya, Malaysia	
17	Loss	14–2–1	Rakhim Chakhkiev	UD	8	24 Sep 2015	KRC Arbat, Moscow, Russia	
16	Win	14–1–1	Augusto Custódio de Melo	TKO	1 (6)	26 Sep 2014	Clube Internacional de Regatas, Santos, Brazil	
15	Loss	13–1–1	Yuniel Dorticos	TKO	1 (10), 2:19	28 Feb 2014	Crowne Plaza Hotel, San Diego, California, U.S.	Lost WBA Fedelatin interim cruiserweight title; For WBC Latino cruiserweight title
14	Win	13–0–1	Galen Brown	TKO	4 (8), 0:33	21 Dec 2013	Westin Bonaventure Hotel, Los Angeles, California, U.S.	
13	Win	12–0–1	Andres Taylor	UD	8	6 Dec 2013	Evangeline Downs Casino, Opelousas, Louisiana, U.S.	
12	Win	11–0–1	Roberto Santos	UD	6	19 Oct 2013	Salón José Cuervo, Polanco, Mexico	
11	Win	10–0–1	Néstor Fabián Insaurralde	KO	1 (8)	17 Aug 2013	Ginásio Celso Daniel, São Paulo, Brazil	Won vacant WBA Fedelatin interim cruiserweight title
10	Win	9–0–1	Grover Young	KO	2 (6), 2:59	6 Jun 2013	The Hangar, Costa Mesa, California, U.S.	
9	Draw	8–0–1	Mitch Williams	SD	6	22 May 2013	Santa Monica Pier, Santa Monica, California, U.S.	
8	Win	8–0	Francisco López	TKO	2 (10)	28 Jul 2012	Ginásio Municipal de Esportes, Sorocaba, Brazil	
7	Win	7–0	Francisco López	KO	1 (10)	13 May 2012	Grêmio Recreativo, São Paulo, Brazil	
6	Win	6–0	Luiz da Silva	TKO	1 (6), 2:42	13 Apr 2012	Discoteca Cabral, São Paulo, Brazil	
5	Win	5–0	Roberto Martins	TKO	2 (6)	4 Dec 2012	Escola de Samba Nenê, São Paulo, Brazil	
4	Win	4–0	Alessandro Bernardo	TKO	2 (6), 2:59	10 Dec 2011	Centro de Tradiçōes, São Paulo, Brazil	
3	Win	3–0	Thabiso Mogale	RTD	3 (6), 3:00	12 Nov 2011	Ginásio Municipal, Rancharia, Brazil	
2	Win	2–0	Eduardo Franca	TKO	1 (4), 2:01	20 Aug 2011	Pitangueiras, São Paulo, Brazil	
1	Win	1–0	Carlos Alberto de Oliveira Júnior	KO	2 (4), 1:38	16 Jul 2011	Guarulhos, São Paulo, Brazil	
