= Carmine Molaro =

Italian boxer (born 1975)

Personal information
- Nationality: Italian
- Born: 20 February 1975 (age 50); Naples, Italy

Sport
- Sport: Boxing

Carmine Molaro (born 20 February 1975) is an Italian former boxer. He competed in the men's flyweight event at the 1996 Summer Olympics.
