= Chris Bessey =

English boxer (born 1971)

Chris Bessey MBE
Personal information
- Nationality: British (English)
- Born: 1971 (age 54–55) Portsmouth
Medal record
Boxing
Representing England
Commonwealth Games
Gold medal – first place	1998 Kuala Lumpur	light middleweight

Christopher David Ernest Bessey (born 1971) is a male retired boxer who competed for England.

== Boxing career ==
Bessey was the National Champion in 1993 after winning the prestigious ABA welterweight title, boxing for the Army. He moved up in weight and won an impressive five more National titles at light middleweight (1995, 1997, 1998, 1999 and 2000).

He represented England in the light middleweight (-71 Kg) division, at the 1998 Commonwealth Games in Kuala Lumpur, Malaysia.

Bessey is a warrant officer in the British Army and a coach of the British army boxing team and was awarded an MBE in the 1997 New Year Honours, when serving with the Royal Logistic Corps.
