= Soubam Suresh Singh =

Indian boxer

Personal information
- Nationality: Indian
- Born: 1 March 1980 (age 45)

Sport
- Sport: Boxing

Soubam Suresh Singh (born 1 March 1980) is an Indian boxer. He competed in the men's light flyweight event at the 2000 Summer Olympics.
