= Iván Pozo =

Spanish boxer (born 1979)

- Born: Iván Pozo; August 26, 1979 (age 47); Vigo, Spain
- Other names: El Pequeño Guerrero (The Little Warrior)
- Nationality: (Spain) Spanish
- Height: 5 ft 4.5 in (1.64 m)
- Division: Flyweight
- Stance: Orthodox
- Fighting out of: Pontevedra, Spain
- Trainer: Paco Amoedo
- Years active: 2000-

Professional boxing record
- Total: 41
- Wins: 32
- By knockout: 20
- Losses: 8
- By knockout: 6
- Draws: 1

Other information
- Boxing record from BoxRec
- Last updated on: 20 October 2012

Iván Pozo (born 26 August 1979 in Vigo, Spain) is a retired Spanish professional boxer. Pozo is a former EBU European Flyweight champion and former WBO Inter-Continental Flyweight champion. He currently fights at bantamweight and defended his WBC Mundo Hispano title by defeating Adonis Rivas by unanimous decision on March 4, 2011.

Preceded by Brahim Asloum	EBU European Flyweight Champion; 2005 - 2006	Succeeded by Andrea Sarritzu

Preceded by Bernard Inom	EBU European Flyweight Champion; 2009	Succeeded by Andrea Sarritzu
