= Muhamed Kizito =

Ugandan boxer (born 1974)

Personal information
- Born: 17 October 1974 (age 51)
Medal record
Men's Boxing
Representing Uganda
All-Africa Games
Gold medal – first place	1999 Johannesburg	Light Flyweight

Sande Muhamed Kizito (born 17 October 1974) is a Ugandan light flyweight boxer. He represented his native African country at the 2000 Summer Olympics in Sydney, Australia, where he was defeated in the first round by Lithuania's Ivanas Stapovičius. Nicknamed "Sunday" he won the gold medal in the men's light flyweight (– 48 kg) division at the 1999 All-Africa Games.
