= Aaron Torres =

American boxer

Personal information
- Born: October 26, 1978 (age 47) Philadelphia, Pennsylvania, United States
- Height: 5 ft 7 in (170 cm)

Boxing career
- Weight class: Super Welter
- Stance: orthodox

Boxing record
- Total fights: 23
- Wins: 16
- Losses: 6
- Draws: 0
- No contests: 0
Medal record
Representing United States
Pan American Games
Bronze medal – third place	1999 Winnipeg	Welterweight

Aaron Torres (born October 26, 1978) is a former professional boxer.

Torres won the bronze medal at the 1999 Pan American Games. As a pro, he defeated fifteen fighters before facing the 17–4–1 Louis Santiago in a fight where he lost in the 9th of 12 rounds. He attempted a comeback on the reality show, Contender Season 2, where he lost to Gary Balletto

Torres next went on to fight another Contender contestant in Freddy Curiel. Torres took the fight with only five days notice and lost the fight.
