= Ismael El Massoudi =

French boxer

Personal information
- Nicknames: La tempête du désert (Desert Storm)
- Nationality: French
- Born: 5 May 1978 (age 48) Morocco
- Height: 5 ft 7 in (170 cm)
- Weight: Light welterweight; Welterweight

Boxing career
- Stance: Orthodox

Boxing record
- Total fights: 47
- Wins: 39
- Win by KO: 14
- Losses: 8

Ismael El Massoudi (born 5 May 1978) is a Moroccan born French former Professional boxer.

== Professional career ==
He won the interim WBA welterweight on July 14, 2011, in Marrakech, Morocco, at the famous marketplace of Jamaâ El Fna, against Souleymane M'baye. He lost the title in his next fight against Argentine contender Diego Chaves.

== Professional boxing record ==
47 fights	39 wins	8 losses
By knockout	14	5
By decision	24	3
By disqualification	1	0

No.	Result	Record	Opponent	Type	Round, time	Date	Location	Notes
47	Loss	39–8	Ceferino Rodríguez	KO	6 (12)	2014-05-09	Gran Canaria Arena, Las Palmas, Spain	For EBU EU welterweight title
46	Loss	39–7	Lenny Bottai	SD	12 (12)	2014-03-27	PalaCosmelli, Livorno, Italy	For vacant IBF Inter-Continental light-middleweight title
45	Win	39–6	Santos Medrano	UD	6 (6)	2013-11-29	Salle du Cosec, Clermont-Ferrand, France	
44	Loss	38–6	Timo Schwarzkopf	UD	8 (8)	2013-06-29	Gustav Heess Gmbh, Stuttgart, Germany	
43	Win	38–5	Benjamin Robles Murry	PTS	6 (6)	2013-05-03	Salle du Cosec, Clermont-Ferrand, France	
42	Loss	37–5	Leonard Bundu	KO	1 (12)	2012-12-01	Palazzetto dello Sport, Rezzato, Italy	For EBU welterweight title
41	Win	37–4	Arek Malek	PTS	6 (6)	2012-10-20	Hall P Gaspard, Épernay, France	
40	Loss	36–4	Diego Chaves	KO	2 (12)	2012-07-21	Sociedad Alemana de Gimnasia, José León Suárez, Argentina	Lost interim WBA welterweight title
39	Win	36–3	Souleymane M'baye	TKO	12 (12)	2011-07-14	Place Jemaa el-Fnaa, Marrakesh, Morocco	Won interim WBA welterweight title
38	Win	35–3	Konstantins Sakara	PTS	6 (6)	2011-05-13	Salle du Cosec, Clermont-Ferrand, France	
37	Win	34–3	Albert Starikov	PTS	6 (6)	2011-03-18	Maison des Sports, Clermont-Ferrand, France	
36	Win	33–3	Pythius Kambembe	UD	12 (12)	2010-12-04	Salle Ibn Yassine, Rabat, Morocco	Won ABU welterweight title
35	Win	32–3	Laszlo Komjathi	PTS	6 (6)	2010-05-21	Salle du Cosec, Clermont-Ferrand, France	
34	Win	31–3	Bismarck Alfaro	RTD	5 (6)	2010-03-19	Salle du Cosec, Clermont-Ferrand, France	
33	Win	30–3	Zoran Cvek	PTS	6 (6)	2009-11-06	Salle du Cosec, Clermont-Ferrand, France	
32	Loss	29–3	Hussein Bayram	TKO	8 (8)	2009-04-23	Cirque d'hiver, Paris, France	
31	Win	29–2	Yoann Camonin	TKO	5 (6)	2009-02-05	Cirque d'hiver, Paris, France	
30	Win	28–2	Rachid Drilzane	UD	10 (10)	2008-11-14	Salle du Cosec, Clermont-Ferrand, France	Retained French light-welterweight title
29	Win	27–2	Marius Racaru	PTS	6 (6)	2008-04-25	Salle du Cosec, Clermont-Ferrand, France	
28	Win	26–2	Abdoulaye Soukouna	UD	10 (10)	2008-02-19	Salle du Cosec, Clermont-Ferrand, France	Retained French light-welterweight title
27	Win	25–2	Marian Hodorog	PTS	6 (6)	2007-11-30	Salle du Cosec, Clermont-Ferrand, France	
26	Win	24–2	Rachid Drilzane	UD	10 (10)	2007-06-15	Salle du Cosec, Clermont-Ferrand, France	Retained French light-welterweight title
25	Win	23–2	Christophe Carlier	UD	10 (10)	2007-04-20	Salle du Cosec, Clermont-Ferrand, France	Retained French light-welterweight title
24	Win	22–2	Mathieu Dubroeucq	TKO	8 (10)	2006-12-12	Salle Millesium, Épernay, France	
23	Loss	21–2	Andrey Kudryavtsev	UD	12 (12)	2006-07-21	Druzhba Arena, Donetsk, Ukraine	For IBF Inter-Continental lightweight title
22	Win	21–1	Eugen Stan	PTS	6 (6)	2006-06-02	Clermont-Ferrand, France	
21	Win	20–1	Ahmed Merichiche	PTS	6 (6)	2006-04-07	Clermont-Ferrand, France	
20	Win	19–1	Tarik Amrouse	PTS	10 (10)	2006-02-24	Clermont-Ferrand, France	Won vacant French light-welterweight title
19	Win	18–1	Nicolae Burloi	TKO	3 (8)	2005-12-02	Salle du Cosec, Clermont-Ferrand, France	
18	Win	17–1	Olivier Bonine	TKO	8 (8)	2005-06-10	Clermont-Ferrand, France	
17	Win	16–1	Lukas Body	PTS	8 (8)	2005-04-01	Clermont-Ferrand, France	
16	Win	15–1	Sorin Marius Petre	TKO	5 (6)	2005-02-12	Clermont-Ferrand, France	
15	Win	14–1	Samir Tergaoui	PTS	6 (6)	2004-12-03	Clermont-Ferrand, France	
14	Win	13–1	Moiline Ramia	PTS	8 (8)	2004-06-11	Clermont-Ferrand, France	
13	Win	12–1	Belaid Yahiaoui	PTS	8 (8)	2004-04-23	Clermont-Ferrand, France	
12	Win	11–1	Lionel Saraille	TKO	4 (6)	2004-02-06	Clermont-Ferrand, France	
11	Win	10–1	Ahmed Merichiche	TKO	2 (6)	2003-11-14	Clermont-Ferrand, France	
10	Win	9–1	Said Boukefous	DQ	3 (6)	2003-06-13	Clermont-Ferrand, France	
9	Loss	8–1	Moiline Ramia	TKO	2 (6)	2003-03-21	Clermont-Ferrand, France	
8	Win	8–0	Serge Emidian	TKO	1 (6)	2003-02-21	Clermont-Ferrand, France	
7	Win	7–0	Abdelamid Maach	PTS	4 (4)	2002-11-15	Clermont-Ferrand, France	
6	Win	6–0	Mounir Mehrouch	PTS	6 (6)	2002-06-14	Clermont-Ferrand, France	
5	Win	5–0	Mohamed Maghraoui	TKO	4 (4)	2002-05-31	Toulon, France	
4	Win	4–0	Mohamed Tabib	TKO	4 (4)	2002-04-26	Clermont-Ferrand, France	
3	Win	3–0	Abdelmajid El Ouazzani	KO	5 (6)	2002-03-23	Échirolles, France	
2	Win	2–0	Abdoulaye Soukouna	PTS	4 (4)	2002-02-26	Clermont-Ferrand, France	
1	Win	1–0	Marian Banciu	TKO	3 (4)	2001-11-23	Clermont-Ferrand, France	

== See also ==
- List of male boxers

Sporting positions
Regional boxing titles
Vacant Title last held by Stephane Benito	French light-welterweight champion February 24, 2006 – 2009; Vacated	Vacant Title next held by Christopher Sebire
Preceded by Pythius Kambembe	African welterweight champion December 4, 2010 – July 14, 2011; Won interim title	Vacant Title next held by Patrice Sou Toke
World boxing titles
Preceded by Souleymane M'baye	WBA welterweight champion Interim title July 14, 2011 – July 21, 2012	Succeeded by Diego Chaves
