= Lernik Papyan =

Armenian boxer

Personal information
- Full name: Լէռնիկ Պապյան
- Nationality: Armenia
- Born: October 26, 1966 (age 59) Vanadzor, Lori, Armenian SSR, Soviet Union
- Height: 1.62 m (5 ft 4 in)
- Weight: 51 kg (112 lb)

Sport
- Sport: Boxing
- Weight class: Flyweight

Lernik Papyan (Armenian: Լէռնիկ Պապյան, born October 26, 1966, in Vanadzor, Lori Province, Armenian SSR) is a retired boxer from Armenia. He represented his native country at the 1996 Summer Olympics in Atlanta, Georgia, in the men's flyweight (51 kg) division. Papyan lost in the second round to eventual gold medalist Maikro Romero of Cuba. Earlier, Papyan represented the Soviet Union at the 1986 Goodwill Games.
