= Valeriy Sydorenko =

Ukrainian boxer

Personal information
- Native name: Валерій Сидоренко
- Full name: Valeriy Petrovych Sydorenko
- Nationality: Ukrainian
- Born: 23 September 1976 (age 49) Enerhodar, Zaporizhia, Ukrainian SSR, Soviet Union
- Height: 1.62 m (5 ft 4 in)
- Weight: 48 kg (106 lb)

Sport
- Sport: Boxing
- Weight class: Light flyweight
Medal record
European Amateur Championships
Gold medal – first place	2000 Tampere	Light flyweight

Valeriy Petrovych Sydorenko (born 23 September 1976) is a Ukrainian former amateur boxer. He competed for his native country at the 2000 Olympics and later won the 2000 European Amateur Boxing Championships.

He is the twin brother of Volodymyr Sydorenko, who fought as a professional.

== Olympic results ==
Sydorenko competed in the 2000 Summer Olympics in Sydney, Australia. He was defeated in the quarterfinals of the Men's Light Flyweight division by Cuba's eventual bronze medalist Maikro Romero. His results were:

- Defeated José Albuquerque (Brazil)
- Defeated Suban Pannon (Thailand)
- Lost to Maikro Romero (Cuba)
