= Boniface Mukuka =

Zambian boxer (born 1972)

Personal information
- Nationality: Zambian
- Born: 6 February 1972 (age 53)

Sport
- Sport: Boxing

Boniface Mukuka (born 6 February 1972) is a Zambian boxer. He competed in the men's flyweight event at the 1996 Summer Olympics.
