= Liborio Romero =

Mexican boxer (born 1979)

Personal information
- Full name: Liborio Romero Romero
- Nickname: Cañas
- Nationality: Mexico
- Born: July 23, 1979 (age 46) Tenancingo, Tlaxcala, Mexico
- Height: 1.59 m (5 ft 3 in)
- Weight: 48 kg (106 lb)

Sport
- Sport: Boxing
- Weight class: Light Flyweight
Medal record
Pan American Games
Silver medal – second place	1999 Winnipeg	Light Flyweight
Central American and Caribbean Games
Bronze medal – third place	1998 Maracaibo	Light Flyweight

Liborio Romero (born July 23, 1979, in Tenancingo, Tlaxcala) is a boxer from Mexico, who represented his native country in the Men's Light Flyweight (– 48 kg) category at the 2000 Summer Olympics in Sydney, Australia.

There he was stopped in the second round by Lithuania's Ivanas Stapovičius. Romero, nicknamed Cañas, won the silver medal a year earlier in the same weight division at the Pan American Games.
