= José Albuquerque =

Brazilian boxer

José Anastácio de Albuquerque (born December 7, 1975, in Senador José Porfírio, Pará) is a Brazilian boxer, who represented his native country in the flyweight division at the 2000 Summer Olympics in Sydney. There he was eliminated in the first round by Ukraine's Valeriy Sydorenko.
