= Sapok Biki =

Malaysian boxer (born 1974)

Lieutenant Colonel Sapok Biki AMN BAT PJK PPS PPA PKN
Personal information
- Nationality: Malaysian
- Born: Sapok Biki; 9 April 1974 (age 52) Simunjan, Sarawak, Malaysia
- Height: 174 cm (5 ft 9 in)
- Weight: Light Flyweight

Boxing career

Boxing record
- Total fights: 30
- Wins: 25
- Win by KO: 15
- Losses: 5
- Draws: 0
- No contests: 00

Sapok Biki (born 9 April 1974) is a Malaysian boxer. He won the gold medal in the light flyweight class at the 1998 Commonwealth Games in Kuala Lumpur. He also competed for his native country at the 1996 Summer Olympics in Atlanta, Georgia. He has since retired from competition and become a coach.

He is of Iban descent from Simunjan, Sarawak. He is serving in the Malaysian Army as a lieutenant colonel. Many local people in Sarawak idolised him and entered boxing after watching Sapok Biki won gold during the 1998 Commonwealth Games.

== Honours ==
- Malaysia
  - Member of the Order of the Defender of the Realm (AMN) (1999)
  - Recipient of the Loyal Service Medal (PPS)
  - Recipient of the General Service Medal (PPA)
  - Recipient of the National Sovereignty Medal (PKN)
- Malaysian Armed Forces
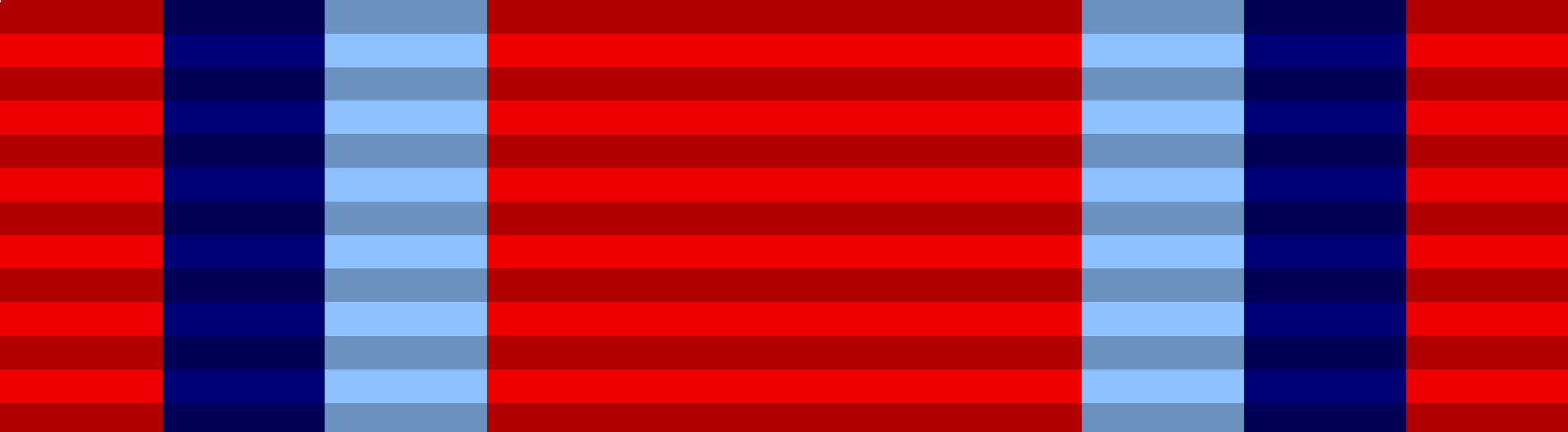
  - Herald of the Most Gallant Order of Military Service (BAT)
- Negeri Sembilan
  - Recipient of the Meritorious Service Medal (PJK) (2003)
- Sarawak
  - Recipient of the Sarawak Independence Golden Jubilee Medal (2013)
  - Gold Medal of the Sarawak Independence Diamond Jubilee Medal (2023)
