= Phumzile Matyhila =

South African boxer (born 1975)

Personal information
- Nationality: South African
- Born: 2 September 1975 (age 49); Mdantsane, South Africa

Sport
- Sport: Boxing

Phumzile Matyhila (born 2 September 1975) is a South African former boxer. He competed in the men's light flyweight event at the 2000 Summer Olympics.
