= Serhiy Kovhanko =

Ukrainian boxer (born 1974)

Personal information
- Full name: Сергій Ковганко
- Nationality: Ukraine
- Born: March 23, 1974 (age 52) Mykolaiv, Ukrainian SSR, Soviet Union
- Height: 1.63 m (5 ft 4 in)
- Weight: 51 kg (112 lb)

Sport
- Sport: Boxing
- Weight class: Flyweight
Medal record
European Amateur Championships
Bronze medal – third place	1996 Vejle	Flyweight

Serhiy Kovhanko (born March 23, 1974) is a boxer from Ukraine, who won the bronze medal in the Men's Flyweight (– 48 kg) division at the 1996 European Amateur Boxing Championships in Vejle, Denmark.

Kovganko represented his native country at the 1996 Summer Olympics in Atlanta, Georgia. There he was stopped in the second round of the Men's Flyweight division by Kazakhstan's eventual silver medalist Bulat Jumadilov.
