= Lynch Ipera =

Papua New Guinean boxer (born 1976)

Personal information
- Nationality: Papua New Guinean
- Born: 4 August 1976 (age 48)

Sport
- Sport: Boxing

Lynch Ipera (born 4 August 1976) is a Papua New Guinean boxer. He competed in the men's featherweight event at the 1996 Summer Olympics.
