= José David Mosquera =

Colombian boxer (born 1983)

Personal information
- Born: October 7, 1983 (age 42) Carepa, Antioquia, Colombia

Sport
- Sport: Boxing
Medal record
Representing Colombia
Central American and Caribbean Games
Bronze medal – third place	2006 Cartagena	Lightweight

José David Mosquera Mosquera (born October 7, 1983) is a Colombian boxer who participated in the 2004 Summer Olympics for his native South American country. There he was outscored in the first round of the Lightweight (60 kg) division by America's Vicente Escobedo. He qualified for the Olympic Games by ending up in second place at the 2nd AIBA American 2004 Olympic Qualifying Tournament in Rio de Janeiro, Brazil.

== Professional boxing record ==
16 Wins (14 knockouts), 5 Losses, 1 Draw
Res.	Record	Opponent	Type	Round, Time	Date	Location	Notes
Loss	16-5-1	(Mexico) Abner Lopez	KO	2 (8)	2015-01-10	Auditorio Municipal Fausto Gutiérrez Moreno, Tijuana, Baja California, Mexico	
Loss	16-4-1	(Mexico) Aaron Herrera	UD	10	2014-07-05	Complejo Deportivo Inalámbrica, Merida, Yucatán, Mexico	
Win	16-3-1	(Colombia) Cesar Rodriguez	KO	2 (6)	2013-09-14	Barrio La Ciudadela, Barranquilla, Colombia	
Win	15-3-1	(Colombia) Julio Cardozo	KO	1 (6)	2013-07-19	Parque de la Independencia, Malambo, Colombia	
Loss	14-3-1	(Panama) Azael Cosio	TKO	9 (10)	2013-03-16	Megapolis Convention Center, Panama City, Panama	
Loss	14-2-1	(Mexico) Armando Robles	TKO	9 (10)	2012-12-14	Palenque del FEX, Mexicali, Baja California, Mexico	
