= John Pearce (boxer) =

English boxer

Personal information
- Nationality: English
- Born: April 1971 (age 55) Teesside

Sport
- Sport: Boxing
- Club: Wellington ABC
Medal record
Men's Boxing
Representing England
Commonwealth Games
Gold medal – first place	1998 Kuala Lumpur	middleweight

John Darren Pearce (born 1971) is a male English former middleweight boxer from the Wellington ABC.

== Boxing career ==
Pearce was a double National champion after winning the prestigious ABA middleweight title in 1996 and 1998.

He represented England in the middleweight (-75 kg) division and won a gold medal at the 1998 Commonwealth Games in Kuala Lumpur, Malaysia. He defeated Jitender Kumar (India) in the final.

== Personal life ==
Pearce from Middlesbrough was at the time MD of his own double glazing company.
