= Ceferino Labarda =

Argentine boxer

Personal information
- Full name: Ceferino Dario Labarda
- Nickname: "El Pelando San Cuss Cus"
- Nationality: Argentina
- Born: April 6, 1981 (age 45) Luján de Cuyo, Mendoza
- Height: 1.64 m (5 ft 5 in)
- Weight: 54 kg (119 lb)

Sport
- Sport: Boxing
- Weight class: Bantamweight
Medal record
Pan American Games
Bronze medal – third place	1999 Winnipeg	Bantamweight
South American Games
Silver medal – second place	2002 Belém	Bantamweight

Ceferino Dario Labarda (born April 6, 1981, in Luján de Cuyo, Mendoza) is a bantamweight boxer from Argentina, who represented his native country at the 2000 Summer Olympics in Sydney, Australia, where he lost to Raimkul Malakhbekov of Russia. He won bronze medals at the 1998 World Junior Championships and 1999 Pan American Games.

Nicknamed "El Pelando San Cuss Cus", he made his professional debut in 2003.

== Professional boxing record ==
19 Wins (7 knockouts), 3 Loss
Res.	Record	Opponent	Type	Rd., Time	Date	Location	Notes
Loss	19-3	(Canada) Benoit Gaudet	KO	6 (10)	2010-10-15	Bell Centre, Montreal, Quebec, Canada	
Loss	19-2	(Australia) Billy Dib	TKO	6 (8)	2010-09-02	Le Montage, Lilyfield, New South Wales, Australia	
Win	19-1	(Argentina) Marcelo Antonio Gomez	UD	4 (4)	2009-12-03	Polideportivo Jorge Newbery, Rio Ceballos, Cordoba, Argentina	
Loss	18-1	(Canada) Steve Molitor	TKO	10 (12)	2008-08-29	Casino Rama, Rama, Ontario, Canada	For IBF World super bantamweight title
Win	18-0	(Argentina) Marcelo Antonio Gomez	RTD	6 (10)	2008-05-30	Sociedad General Belgrano, Cordoba, Cordoba, Argentina	
Win	17-0	(Argentina) Marcelo Antonio Gomez	KO	4 (6)	2007-10-19	Polideportivo Carlos Cerutti, Cordoba, Cordoba, Argentina	
Win	16-0	(Argentina) Diego Miguel Ramirez	KO	2 (10)	2007-07-06	Rio Ceballos, Cordoba, Argentina	
Win	15-0	(Argentina) Marcelo Antonio Gomez	UD	6 (6)	2007-02-16	Salon de Usos Multiples, Bialet Masse, Cordoba, Argentina	
Win	14-0	(Argentina) Juan Carlos Cejas	UD	6 (6)	2006-04-21	Super Domo Orfeo, Cordoba, Cordoba, Argentina	
