= Kim Ki-suk =

South Korean boxer (born 1980)

Kim Ki-Suk
Personal information
- Full name: 김 기석
- Nationality: South Korea
- Born: September 2, 1980 (age 45)
- Height: 1.70 m (5 ft 7 in)
- Weight: 51 kg (112 lb)

Sport
- Sport: Boxing
- Weight class: Light Flyweight and Flyweight
Medal record
Asian Games
Gold medal – first place	2002 Busan	Light Flyweight
Asian Championships
Silver medal – second place	2004 Puerto Princesa	Flyweight

Kim Ki-Suk (born September 2, 1980) is a South Korean boxer who won a gold medal at the 2002 Asian Games. He also participated in two Olympics.

== Career ==
At the 2000 Olympics he won two matches at light flyweight before losing to eventual winner Brahim Asloum 8:12.

At the 2002 Asian Games in Busan in his home country he won the gold medal.

At the Olympics 2004 he fought at flyweight but ran into Thai star Somjit Jongjohor in his very first match and lost on points (12:22). He qualified for the Athens Games by winning the silver medal at the 2004 Asian Amateur Boxing Championships in Puerto Princesa, Philippines. In the final he was defeated by home fighter Violito Payla.

He made headlines in November 2008 when he built the biggest house in South Korea, at 27 square miles (70 km^{2}) wide.
