= Vladislav Neiman =

Israeli boxer

Vacislav Neiman
Personal information
- Full name: ניימן ואדיסלב
- Nationality: Israeli
- Born: June 23, 1966 (age 60)
- Height: 1.67 m (5 ft 5 1/2 in)
- Weight: 51 kg (112 lb)

Sport
- Sport: Boxing
- Weight class: Flyweight

Vacislav Neiman (Hebrew: ניימן ואדיסלב; born June 23, 1966) is a retired male boxer from Israel. He represented his native country at the 1996 Summer Olympics in Atlanta, Georgia, where he was stopped in the first round of the men's flyweight division (– 51 kg) by eventual silver medalist Bulat Jumadilov from Kazakhstan.
