= Patricio Calero =

Ecuadorian boxer

Personal information
- Full name: Patricio Rubén Calero Zamora
- Born: July 20, 1977 (age 48) El Empalme, Guayas
- Height: 1.60 m (5 ft 3 in)
- Weight: 48 kg (106 lb)

Sport
- Sport: Boxing
- Weight class: Light Flyweight
- Club: Federación Deportiva de Napo
Medal record
Pan American Games
Bronze medal – third place	1999 Winnipeg	Light Flyweight
South American Games

MedalGold 2006 South American Games 2006 Buenos Aires Boxing at the 2006 South American Games Light Flyweight

Patricio Calero (born July 20, 1977, in El Empalme, Guayas) is a boxer from Ecuador, who represented his native country in the Men's Light Flyweight (– 48 kg) category at the 2004 Summer Olympics in Athens, Greece. Tri campeón de Juegos Sudamericanos

There he was stopped in the first round by Russia's eventual bronze medalist Sergey Kazakov. Calero won the bronze medal in the same weight division at the 1999 Pan American Games. He qualified for the Olympic Games by ending up in second place at the 2nd AIBA American 2004 Olympic Qualifying Tournament in Rio de Janeiro, Brazil.

== Results ==
=== 1999 Pan American Games ===
- Defeated Conrad Scott (JAM), 14:1
- Lost to Liborio Romero (MEX), 4:12

=== 2003 Pan American Games ===
- Lost to José Perez (VEN), 5:12

Tri campeón de Juegos sudamericanos 1998,2002 y 2006
