= Mehdi Assous =

Algerian boxer (born 1977)

Personal information
- Full name: مهدي عسوس
- Nationality: Algeria
- Born: September 25, 1977 (age 48)
- Height: 1.52 m (5 ft 0 in)
- Weight: 51 kg (112 lb)

Sport
- Sport: Boxing
- Weight class: Flyweight

Mehdi Assous (Arabic: مهدي عسوس; born September 25, 1977) is a retired boxer from Algeria. He represented his country at the 1996 Summer Olympics in Atlanta, Georgia, where he was stopped in the quarterfinals of the men's flyweight division (– 51 kg) by eventual bronze medalist Zoltan Lunka from Germany.
