= Sebusiso Keketsi =

Lesotho boxer (born 1981)

Personal information
- Nationality: Lesotho
- Born: 4 April 1981 (age 45)

Boxing career
Medal record
Representing Lesotho
Men's Light flyweight
All-Africa Games
Bronze medal – third place	1999 Johannesburg	48 kg

Sebusiso Keketsi OLY (born 4 April 1981) is a Lesotho male light flyweight boxer. He competed at the 2000 Summer Olympics in the men's light flyweight event.

Sebusiso is currently working as a boxing coach in Lesotho.
