= Anyetei Laryea =

Ghanaian boxer

Personal information
- Nickname: The Chameleon
- Nationality: Ghanaian
- Born: 26 August 1976 (age 50) Tamale, Ghana
- Weight: super bantam/feather/super feather/lightweight

Boxing career

Boxing record
- Total fights: 24
- Wins: 18 (KO 9)
- Losses: 6 (KO 1)

Anyetei "The Chameleon" Laryea (born 26 August 1978) is a Ghanaian professional super bantam/feather/super feather/lightweight boxer of the 1990s and 2000s who won the Ghanaian bantamweight title, West African Boxing Union bantamweight title, Ghanaian super bantamweight title, West African Boxing Union super bantamweight title, and Commonwealth super bantamweight title, and was a challenger for the African Boxing Union (ABU) bantamweight title against Friday Fatunji Felix, Commonwealth featherweight title against Nicky Cook, and World Boxing Association (WBA) Inter-Continental super bantamweight title against Gabula Vabaza, his professional fighting weight varied from 120 3/4 lb (54.8 kg; 8 st 8.8 lb), i.e. super bantamweight to 132 lb (60 kg; 9 st 6 lb), i.e. lightweight.
