= David Walker (boxer) =

Retired boxer who competed for England

Personal information
- Nationality: England
- Born: 17 June 1976 (age 50) Bromley, London

Sport
- Club: Fisher ABC

David Joseph Walker (born 1976) is a male retired boxer who competed for England.

== Boxing career ==
Walker was the National Champion in 1998 after winning the prestigious ABA welterweight title, boxing out of the Fisher ABC.

He represented England in the welterweight (-67 kg) division, at the 1998 Commonwealth Games in Kuala Lumpur, Malaysia.

He turned professional on 20 April 2000 and was known as Kid Dynamite.
