= Rezkalla Mohamed Abdelrehim =

Egyptian boxer (born 1978)

Personal information
- Nationality: Egyptian
- Born: 13 May 1978 (age 47)
- Height: 1.65 m (5 ft 5 in)
- Weight: 48 kg (106 lb)

Sport
- Sport: Boxing

Rezkalla Mohamed Abdelrehim (born 13 May 1978) is an Egyptian boxer. He competed in the 2000 Summer Olympics.
