= Glaucélio Abreu =

Brazilian boxer (born 1978)

Personal information
- Born: 5 February 1978 (age 48) Igarapé, Brazil
- Height: 1.85 m (6 ft 1 in)
- Weight: 75 kg (165 lb)

Sport
- Sport: Boxing
Medal record
Representing Brazil
Pan American Games
Bronze medal – third place	2007 Rio de Janeiro	Middleweight
South American Games
Gold medal – first place	2002 Belem	Middleweight

Glaucélio Serrão Abreu (born 5 February 1978) is a Brazilian boxer. He competed in the 2004 Summer Olympics.
