= Richard Sunee =

Mauritian boxer (born 1966)

Personal information
- Nationality: Mauritian
- Born: 12 December 1966 (age 58)

Sport
- Sport: Boxing

Richard Sunee (born 12 December 1966) is a Mauritian boxer. He competed in the men's flyweight event at the 1996 Summer Olympics.
