= Jean Carlos Prada =

Venezuelan boxer (born 1984)

Personal information
- Born: August 4, 1984 (age 42) Cumaná, Venezuela
Medal record
Men's Boxing
Representing Venezuela
Central American and Caribbean Games
Bronze medal – third place	2006 Cartagena	Welterweight
South American Games
Bronze medal – third place	2006 Buenos Aires	Welterweight

Jean Carlos Prada Pasedo (born August 4, 1984) is a male welterweight boxer from Venezuela, who represented his country at the 2004 Summer Olympics in Athens, Greece. He was defeated in the first round of the men's welterweight division (– 69 kg) by Uzbekistan's Sherzod Husanov on points: 20-33. He qualified for the Olympic Games by finishing in second place at the 2nd AIBA American 2004 Olympic Qualifying Tournament in Rio de Janeiro, Brazil.

== Pro career ==
Jean Carlos Prada made his professional debut on ESPN Wednesday Night Fights against Puerto Rican Carlos Garcia. A four round fight where both fighters scored knockdowns. The bout went the distance, and was scored a draw. Since then, Prada went on to win 4 straight.
