= Jeremy Molitor =

Canadian boxer

Personal information
- Born: December 30, 1977 (age 48) Lambton County
Medal record
Men's Boxing
Representing Canada
Commonwealth Games
| Gold medal – first place | 1998 Kuala Lumpur | Welterweight |
Pan American Games
| Silver medal – second place | 1999 Winnipeg | Welterweight |

Jeremy Molitor is a former boxer and Commonwealth Games gold medalist, he is currently on parole for second-degree murder.

== Boxing career ==
Molitor and his younger brother Steve were known as the "Bruise Brothers", as they rose from Sarnia's gyms to the top of Canada's amateur boxing ranks in the late 1990s. Both siblings were educated at Northern Collegiate Institute and Vocational School (NCIVS). A former nine-time national amateur champion, Molitor gained attention at the 1998 Commonwealth Games held at Kuala Lumpur. There, he won the Welterweight (67 kg) title, defeating Absolom Okoth of Kenya 14–9 to claim the gold medal. He dropped the puck for an OHL game between the Sarnia Sting and Kitchener Rangers held in Sarnia, and had some minor sponsorship deals.

Molitor failed to qualify for the 2000 Summer Olympics due to suffering a broken hand three days before the Sydney 2000 team trials. His career declined as he battled addictions to cocaine and alcohol and failed to maintain his former training regime. He tried moving to Toronto for several months to train with his up-and-coming brother, but his personal problems continued.

His younger brother Steve Molitor is a former professional boxer, who held the International Boxing Federation light featherweight championship.

== Conviction ==
On May 4, 2002, five months after moving back to Sarnia, he murdered his ex-girlfriend, 21-year-old Jessica Nethery, in a parking lot, stabbing her 58 times. At the time, Molitor was under a restraining order to stay away from his former girlfriend, whom he had previously abused. Molitor was also listed in police reports as being under the influence of drugs and alcohol at the time.

In December 2004, Molitor was convicted of second-degree murder, and the following May was sentenced to life in prison with no chance of parole for 14 years. Molitor was housed at Millhaven Institution near Kingston, Ontario. With credit for time already served he could apply for parole in 2016.

== Parole ==
On November 26, 2015, Molitor was granted day parole after appealing a previous decision to deny parole in November 2014. The appeal was granted on the grounds that members of the board reported they weren't convinced Molitor's "tendency to manipulate others has in fact ended," according to a copy of the board's decision. Molitor was eventually granted full parole in 2019.
