= James Hegney (boxer) =

English boxer (born 1978)

Personal information
- Nationality: England
- Born: 1978 (age 46–47) West Midlands

Sport
- Club: Castle Vale ABC

James Hegney (born 1978) is a retired boxer who competed for England.

== Boxing career ==
Hegney was an English National Champion in 1998 after winning the ABA flyweight title, boxing out of the Castle Vale ABC.

He represented England in the flyweight (-51Kg) division, at the 1998 Commonwealth Games in Kuala Lumpur, Malaysia.
