= Ivanas Stapovičius =

Lithuanian boxer (born 1980)

Personal information
- Born: July 14, 1980 (age 45) Vilnius, Lithuanian SSR, Soviet Union
Medal record
Men's Boxing
Representing Lithuania
European Amateur Championships
Silver medal – second place	1998 Minsk	Light Flyweight

Ivanas Stapovičius (born July 14, 1980 in Vilnius) is a retired boxer from Lithuania. He represented his native country at the 2000 Summer Olympics in Sydney, Australia, where he lost in the quarterfinals of the men's lightflyweight division (– 48 kg) to North Korea's eventual bronze medalist Kim Un-Chol.
