= Tunisia at the 1996 Summer Olympics =

- IOC code: TUN
- NOC: Tunisian Olympic Committee
- Website: www.cnot.org.tn (in French)

in Atlanta
- Competitors: 51 (45 men and 6 women) in 9 sports
- Flag bearer: Iskander Hachicha
- Medals Ranked 71st: Gold 0 Silver 0 Bronze 1 Total 1

Summer Olympics appearances (overview)
- 1960; 1964; 1968; 1972; 1976; 1980; 1984; 1988; 1992; 1996; 2000; 2004; 2008; 2012; 2016; 2020; 2024

Tunisia was represented at the 1996 Summer Olympics in Atlanta, Georgia, United States by the Tunisian Olympic Committee. It was the nation's ninth appearance at the Olympics, after missing the 1980 Summer Olympics because of its partial support for the United States boycott.

In total, 51 athletes including 45 men and six woman represented Tunisia in nine different sports including athletics, boxing, fencing, football, judo, table tennis, tennis, volleyball and wrestling.

Tunisia won one medal at the games after Fathi Missaoui claimed bronze in the boxing light welterweight category.

== Competitors ==
In total, 51 athletes represented Tunisia at the 1996 Summer Olympics in Atlanta, Georgia, United States across nine different sports.

Sport	Men	Women	Total
Athletics	5	1	6
Boxing	4	–	4
Fencing	0	1	1
Football	17	0	17
Judo	4	2	6
Table tennis	0	1	1
Tennis	0	1	1
Volleyball	12	0	12
Wrestling	3	–	3
Total	45	6	51

== Medalists ==
Tunisia won one medal at the games after Fathi Missaoui claimed bronze in the boxing light welterweight category.

Medal	Name	Sport	Event	Date
Bronze	Fathi Missaoui	Boxing	Light welterweight	2 August

== Athletics ==
In total, six Tunisian athletes participated in the athletics events – Mohieddine Beni Daoud and Hatem Ghoula in the men's 20 km race walk, Monia Kari in the women's discus throw, Ali Hakimi in the men's 1,500 metres, Tahar Mansouri in the men's marathon, Karim Sassi in the men's triple jump.

Men
Track and road events

Athletes	Events	Heat Round 1		Heat Round 2		Semifinal		Final	
Athletes	Events	Time	Rank	Time	Rank	Time	Rank	Time	Rank
Ali Hakimi	1500 metres	3:36.58	3 Q	—N/a		3:35.91	10 Q	3:38.19	8
Tahar Mansouri	Marathon	—N/a						2:18:06	26
Mohieddine Beni Daoud	20 km walk	—N/a						1:27:15	37
Hatem Ghoula	20 km walk	—N/a						1:25:52	33

Field events

Athlete	Event	Qualification		Final	
Athlete	Event	Result	Rank	Result	Rank
Karim Sassi	Triple jump	14.25	43	Did not advance	

Women

Athlete	Event	Qualification		Final	
Athlete	Event	Result	Rank	Result	Rank
Monia Kari	Discus throw	58.02	28	Did not advance	

== Boxing ==
In total, four Tunisian athletes participated in the boxing events – Kamel Chater in the welterweight category, Mohamed Salah Marmouri in the light middleweight category, Fathi Missaoui in the light welterweight category and Kalai Riadh in the bantamweight category.

Athlete	Event	Round of 32	Round of 16	Quarterfinals	Semifinals	Final	
Athlete	Event	Opposition Result	Opposition Result	Opposition Result	Opposition Result	Opposition Result	Rank
Kalai Riadh	Bantamweight	Swan (AUS); W 14-4	Raicu-Olteanu (ROM); L 3-16	Did not advance			
Fathi Missaoui	Light welterweight	Trautsch (AUS); W 25-9	Barrett (IRL); W 18-6	Allalou (ALG); W 16-15	Urkal (GER); L 6-20	Did not advance	Bronze medal
Kamel Chater	Welterweight	Kyvelos (CAN); W 4-4 TB	Karpaciauskas (LTU); W RSC-1	Saitov (RUS); L 3-9	Did not advance		5
Mohamed Salah Marmouri	Light middleweight	Masoe (ASA); W 11-8	Johnson (NOR); W 17-4	Reid (USA); L 8-13	Did not advance		5

== Fencing ==
In total, one Tunisian athlete participated in the fencing events – Henda Zaouali in the women's individual foil and the women's individual épée.

Athlete	Event	Round of 64	Round of 32	Round of 16	Quarterfinal	Semifinal	Final
Athlete	Event	Opposition Result	Opposition Result	Opposition Result	Opposition Result	Opposition Result	Opposition Result
Henda Zaouali	Women's individual foil	Felusiak (POL); L 15-9	Did not advance				
Henda Zaouali	Women's individual épée	Jakimiuk (POL); L 15-7	Did not advance				

== Football ==
In total, 17 Tunisian athletes participated in the football events – Khaled Badra, Lotfi Baccouche, Zoubeir Baya, Marouane Bokri, Riadh Bouazizi, Ferid Chouchane, Tarek Ben Chrouda, Chokri El Ouaer, Hassen Gabsi, Kaies Ghodhbane, Sabri Jaballah, Radhi Jaïdi, Maher Kanzari, Mohamed Mkacher, Adel Sellimi, Mehdi Ben Slimane and Imed Ben Younes in the men's tournament.

Group stage

Team	Pld	W	D	L	GF	GA	GD	Pts
Argentina	3	1	2	0	5	3	+2	5
Portugal	3	1	2	0	4	2	+2	5
United States	3	1	1	1	4	4	0	4
Tunisia	3	0	1	2	1	5	−4	1

July 20, 1996
15.00

Portugal	2–0	Tunisia
Martins 13', 68'	Report

RFK Stadium, Washington, D.C.
Attendance: 34,796
Referee: Pereira (BRA)

July 22, 1996
19.30

United States	2–0	Tunisia
Kirovski 38'; Maisonneuve 90'	Report

Legion Field, Birmingham
Attendance: 45,687
Referee: Hugh Dallas (GBR)

July 24, 1996
19.30

Argentina	1–1	Tunisia
Ortega 5'	Report	Mkacher 74'

Legion Field, Birmingham
Attendance: 16,826
Referee: Un-Prasert (THA)

== Judo ==
In total, six Tunisian athletes participated in the judo events – Slim Agrebi in the men's +95 kg category, Makrem Ayed in the men's –60 kg category, Raoudha Chaari in the women's –56 kg category, Skander Hachicha in the men's –86 kg category, Hassen Moussa in the men's –71 kg category and Hajer Tbessi in the men's –61 kg category.

Men

Athlete	Event	Preliminary	Round of 32	Round of 16	Quarterfinals	Semifinals	Repechage 1	Repechage 2	Repechage 3	Final / BM	
Athlete	Event	Opposition Result	Opposition Result	Opposition Result	Opposition Result	Opposition Result	Opposition Result	Opposition Result	Opposition Result	Opposition Result	Rank
Makrem Ayed	−60 kg	Bye	Nikolay Oyegin (RUS); L 0000-0010	Did not advance							21
Hassen Moussa	−71 kg	—N/a	Andrey Shturbabin (UZB); L 0000-0010	Did not advance							21
Skander Hachicha	−86 kg	Bye	Yosvane Despaigne (CUB); W 0000–0001	Did not advance							21
Slim Agrebi	+95 kg	Bye	Igor Peshkov (KAZ); L 0000-1000	Did not advance							21

Women

Athlete	Event	Preliminary	Round of 32	Round of 16	Quarterfinals	Semifinals	Repechage 1	Repechage 2	Repechage 3	Final / BM	
Athlete	Event	Opposition Result	Opposition Result	Opposition Result	Opposition Result	Opposition Result	Opposition Result	Opposition Result	Opposition Result	Opposition Result	Rank
Raoudha Chaari	−56 kg	—N/a	Nicola Fairbrother (GBR); L 0000-1000	Did not advance							20
Hajer Tbessi	−61 kg	—N/a	Ching Hui Wu (HKG); W 1000-0000	Gella Vandecaveye (BEL); L 0000-1000	Did not advance		Bye	Xiomara Griffith (VEN); L 0000-1000	Did not advance		9

== Table tennis ==
In total, one Tunisian athlete participated in the table tennis events – Sonia Touati in the women's singles.

Athlete	Event	Group round		Round of 16	Quarterfinals	Semifinals	Bronze medal	Final	
Athlete	Event	Opposition Result	Rank	Opposition Result	Opposition Result	Opposition Result	Opposition Result	Opposition Result	Rank
Sonia Touati	Women's singles	Group G Nicole Struse (GER); L 0 – 2 Taeko Todo (JPN); L 0 – 2 Tamara Boroš (ROM); L 0 – 2	4	Did not advance					

== Tennis ==
In total, one Tunisian athletes participated in the tennis events – Selima Sfar in the women's singles.

Athlete	Event	Round of 64	Round of 32	Round of 16	Quarterfinals	Semifinals	Final	
Athlete	Event	Opposition Score	Opposition Score	Opposition Score	Opposition Score	Opposition Score	Opposition Score	Rank
Selima Sfar	Singles	Schultz-McCarthy (NED); L 4–6, 0–6	Did not advance					

== Volleyball ==
In total, 12 Tunisian athletes participated in the volleyball events – Faycal Ben Amara, Tarek Aouni, Mohamed Baghdadi, Khaled Bel Aïd, Riadh Ghandri, Ghazi Guidara, Riadh Hedhili, Noureddine Hfaiedh, Ghazi Koubaa, Atif Loukil, Hichem Ben Romdhane and Majdi Toumi in the indoor men's tournament.

Group B

Pos	Team	Pld	W	L	Pts	SW	SL	SR	SPW	SPL	SPR	Qualification
1	Italy	5	5	0	10	15	0	MAX	225	138	1.630	Quarterfinals
2	Netherlands	5	4	1	9	12	3	4.000	209	131	1.595	Quarterfinals
3	FR Yugoslavia	5	3	2	8	9	8	1.125	215	191	1.126	Quarterfinals
4	Russia	5	2	3	7	7	9	0.778	196	201	0.975	Quarterfinals
5	South Korea	5	1	4	6	3	12	0.250	156	198	0.788	
6	Tunisia	5	0	5	5	1	15	0.067	98	240	0.408	

Date		Score		Set 1	Set 2	Set 3	Set 4	Set 5	Total
21 Jul	Netherlands	3–0	Tunisia	15–4	15–4	15–2			45–10
23 Jul	Italy	3–0	Tunisia	15–9	15–5	15–1			45–15
25 Jul	Yugoslavia	3–1	Tunisia	15–4	15–17	15–3	15–3		60–27
27 Jul	South Korea	3–0	Tunisia	15–4	15–6	15–6			45–16
29 Jul	Russia	3–0	Tunisia	15–9	15–10	15–11			45–30

== Wrestling ==
In total, three Tunisian athletes participated in the wrestling events – Omrane Ayari in the Greco-Roman –130 kg category, Mohamed Naouar in the –100 kg category and Nabil Salhi in the Greco-Roman –57 kg category.

Athlete	Event	Round 1	Round 2	Round 3	Round 4	Round 5	Round 6	Final / BM	
Athlete	Event	Opposition Result	Opposition Result	Opposition Result	Opposition Result	Opposition Result	Opposition Result	Opposition Result	Rank
Nabil Salhi	-57 kg	Manukyan (ARM); L 0-4	Šukevičius (LTU); L 0-11	did not advance					20
Mohamed Naouar	–100 kg	Wroński (POL); L 0-10	Bürgler (SUI); L 0-11	did not advance					17
Omrane Ayari	–130 kg	Karelin (RUS); L 0-10	Bel Aziz (MAR); W 4-2	Suzuki (JPN); L 3-4	did not advance				11
