= Boxing at the 1996 Summer Olympics – Light welterweight =

Boxing competitions

Light welterweight boxing at the Games of the XXVI Olympiad
- Venue: Alexander Memorial Coliseum
- Dates: 24 July – 4 August 1996
- Competitors: 32 from 32 nations

Medalists
1st place, gold medalist(s)		Héctor Vinent	Cuba
2nd place, silver medalist(s)		Oktay Urkal	Germany
3rd place, bronze medalist(s)		Fathi Missaoui	Tunisia
3rd place, bronze medalist(s)		Bolat Niyazymbetov	Kazakhstan

The Light Welterweight class in the boxing at the 1996 Summer Olympics competition was the sixth-lightest class at the 1996 Summer Olympics in Atlanta, Georgia. The weight class was open for boxers weighing more than 63.5 kilograms. The competition in the Alexander Memorial Coliseum started on 1996-07-20 and ended on 1996-08-04.

== Medalists ==
Gold	Héctor Vinent; Cuba
Silver	Oktay Urkal; Germany
Bronze	Fathi Missaoui; Tunisia
Bronze	Bolat Niyazymbetov; Kazakhstan

== Results ==
Round of 32
Han Hyeong-min (KOR)	1:00
Hector Vinent (CUB)	RSC-2
Nurhan Süleymanoğlu (TUR)	21
Aboubacar Diallo (GUI)	5
Phillip Boudreault (CAN)	16
Haji Matumla (TAN)	12
Eduard Zakharov (RUS)	21
Fumitaka Nitami (JPN)	6
Steven Kevi (PNG)	3
Davis Mwale (ZAM)	16
Carlos Martínez (MEX)	3
Bulat Niyazymbetov (KAZ)	25
Dairo Esalas (COL)	12
Gerry Legras (SEY)	26
Babak Moghimi (IRI)	11
Radoslav Suslekov (BUL)	3
Jacek Bielski (POL)	18
Luis Deines Pérez (PUR)	2
Peter Bulinga (KEN)	3
Mohamed Allalou (ALG)	17
Zely dos Santos (BRA)	7
Francis Barrett (IRL)	32
Lee Trautsch (AUS)	9
Fathi Missaoui (TUN)	25
Jacobo Garcia (ISV)	2:27
David Diaz (USA)	RSC-3
Oktay Urkal (GER)	19
Reynaldo Galido (PHI)	2
Sergey Bykovsky (BLR)	TB 11
Besarion Vardzelashvili (GEO)	11
Nordine Mouchi (FRA)	KO-1
Ullah Usman (PAK)	1:24 (16)

Round of 16
Hector Vinent (CUB)	23
Nurhan Süleymanoğlu (TUR)	1
Phillip Boudreault (CAN)	9
Eduard Zakharov (RUS)	11
Davis Mwale (ZAM)	3
Bulat Niyazymbetov (KAZ)	11
Gerry Legras (SEY)	7
Babak Moghimi (IRI)	16
Jacek Bielski (POL)	8
Mohamed Allalou (ALG)	19
Francis Barrett (IRL)	6
Fathi Missaoui (TUN)	16
David Diaz (USA)	6
Oktay Urkal (GER)	14
Sergey Bykovsky (BLR)	6
Nordine Mouchi (FRA)	17

Quarterfinals
Hector Vinent (CUB)	15
Eduard Zakharov (RUS)	7
Bulat Niyazymbetov (KAZ)	13
Babak Moghimi (IRI)	8
Mohamed Allalou (ALG)	15
Fathi Missaoui (TUN)	16
Oktay Urkal (GER)	19
Nordine Mouchi (FRA)	8

Semifinals
Hector Vinent (CUB)	23
Bulat Niyazymbetov (KAZ)	6
Fathi Missaoui (TUN)	6
Oktay Urkal (GER)	20

Final
Hector Vinent (CUB)	20
Oktay Urkal (GER)	13
