= Boxing at the 2000 Summer Olympics – Light welterweight =

Boxing competitions

Men's light welterweight boxing at the Games of the XXVII Olympiad
- Venue: Sydney Convention and Exhibition Centre
- Date: 20 September to 1 October 2000
- Competitors: 28 from 28 nations

Medalists
1st place, gold medalist(s)		Mahammatkodir Abdullaev; Uzbekistan
2nd place, silver medalist(s)		Ricardo Williams; United States
3rd place, bronze medalist(s)		Mohamed Allalou; Algeria
3rd place, bronze medalist(s)		Diógenes Luña; Cuba

The men's light welterweight boxing competition at the 2000 Olympic Games in Sydney was held from 20 September to 1 October at the Sydney Convention and Exhibition Centre.

== Competition format ==
Like all Olympic boxing events, the competition was a straight single-elimination tournament. This event consisted of 28 boxers who have qualified for the competition through various qualifying tournaments held in 1999 and 2000. The competition began with a preliminary round on 20 September, where the number of competitors was reduced to 16, and concluded with the final on 1 October. As there were fewer than 32 boxers in the competition, a number of boxers received a bye through the preliminary round. Both semi-final losers were awarded bronze medals.

All bouts consisted of four rounds of two minutes each, with one-minute breaks between rounds. Punches scored only if the white area on the front of the glove made full contact with the front of the head or torso of the opponent. Five judges scored each bout; three of the judges had to signal a scoring punch within one second for the punch to score. The winner of the bout was the boxer who scored the most valid punches by the end of the bout.

== Competitors ==
Name	Country
Willy Blain	France
Diógenes Luña	Cuba
Vyacheslav Senchenko	Ukraine
Saleh Khoulef	Egypt
Henry Collins	Australia
Ricardo Williams	United States
Ajose Olusegun	Nigeria
Anoushirvan Nourian	Iran
Mariusz Cendrowski	Poland
Hwang Sung-Bum	South Korea
Sami Khelifi	Tunisia
Aleksandr Leonov	Russia
Victor Hugo Castro	Argentina
Kay Huste	Germany
Pongsak Rientuanthong	Thailand
Sven Paris	Italy
Mohamed Allalou	Algeria
Lukáš Konecný	Czech Republic
Ben Neequaye	Ghana
Frederick Munga Kinuthia	Kenya
Romeo Brin	Philippines
Siarhei Bykovski	Belarus
Michael Strange	Canada
Nurhan Suleymanoglu	Turkey
Ghulam Shabbir	Pakistan
Kelson Santos	Brazil
Miguel Cotto	Puerto Rico
Mahammatkodir Abdullaev	Uzbekistan

== Results ==
All times are Australian Time (UTC+10)

Round of 32; Wednesday, September 20, 2000; 13:00 & 19:30
Henry Collins (AUS)
Ricardo Williams (USA)	RSC
Ajose Olusegun (NGR)	WO
Anoushirvan Nourian (IRI)
Mariusz Cendrowski (POL)	4
Hwang Seong-beom (KOR)	14
Sami Khelifi (TUN)	9
Aleksandr Leonov (RUS)	14
Víctor Hugo Castro (ARG)	3
Kay Huste (GER)	5
Pongsak Hrientounthong (THA)	3
Sven Paris (ITA)	14
Mohamed Allalou (ALG)	17
Lukáš Konecný (CZE)	9
Ben Neequaye (GHA)	14
Fred Kinuthia (KEN)	2
Romeo Brin (PHI)	5
Siarhei Bykovski (BLR)	8
Michael Strange (CAN)	3
Nurhan Suleymanoglu (TUR)	9
Ghulam Shabbir (PAK)
Kelson Santos (BRA)	RSC
Miguel Cotto (PUR)	7
Mahammatkodir Abdullaev (UZB)	17

Round of 16; Sunday, September 24, 2000; 13:00 & 19:30
Willy Blain (FRA)	14
Diógenes Luña (CUB)	25
Vyacheslav Senchenko (UKR)	16
Saleh Khoulef (EGY)	19
Ricardo Williams (USA)	RSC
Ajose Olusegun (NGR)
Hwang Sung-Bum (KOR)	10
Aleksandr Leonov (RUS)	14
Kay Huste (GER)	11
Sven Paris (ITA)	17
Mohamed Allalou (ALG)	15
Ben Neequaye (GHA)	6
Siarhei Bykovski (BLR)	8^{+}
Nurhan Suleymanoglu (TUR)	8
Kelson Santos (BRA)
Mahammatkodir Abdullaev (UZB)	RSC

Quarter-finals; Wednesday, September 27, 2000; 13:00 & 19:30
Diógenes Luña (CUB)	RSC
Saleh Khoulef (EGY)
Ricardo Williams (USA)	17
Aleksandr Leonov (RUS)	12
Sven Paris (ITA)	8
Mohamed Allalou (ALG)	22
Siarhei Bykovski (BLR)	6
Mahammatkodir Abdullaev (UZB)	9

Semi-finals; Friday, September 29, 2000; 19:30
Diógenes Luña (CUB)	41
Ricardo Williams (USA)	42
Mohamed Allalou (ALG)
Mahammatkodir Abdullaev (UZB)	RSC

Final; Sunday, October 1, 2000; 13:00
Ricardo Williams (USA)	20
Mahammatkodir Abdullaev (UZB)	27
