= Nurhan Süleymanoğlu =

Turkish boxer

Personal information
- Full name: Nurhan Süleymanoğlu
- Nationality: Turkey
- Born: February 28, 1971 (age 55) Chingkyut, Kazakhstan
- Height: 1.75 m (5 ft 9 in)
- Weight: 63 kg (139 lb)

Sport
- Sport: Boxing
- Weight class: Light Welterweight
Medal record
World Amateur Championships
Silver medal – second place	1995 Berlin	Light Welterweight
European Amateur Championships
Gold medal – first place	1993 Bursa	Light Welterweight
Silver medal – second place	1996 Vejle	Light Welterweight
Silver medal – second place	1998 Minsk	Light Welterweight
Bronze medal – third place	2000 Tampere	Light Welterweight
Goodwill Games
Silver medal – second place	1994 Saint Petersburg	Light Welterweight

Nurhan Süleymanoğlu (Kazakh: Нұрхан Сүлейменов, born February 28, 1971) is a Kazakhstan-born Turkish former professional boxer who competed from 2001 to 2007.

As an amateur, he participated at the 1996 Summer Olympics, where he was stopped in the second round of the light welterweight (63,5 kg) division by Cuba's Héctor Vinent. At the 2000 Summer Olympics he was stopped in the second round by Belarus' Sergey Bykovsky.

Süleymanoğlu won silver medals in the same division at the 1995 World Championships and the 1996 European Championships, as well as a gold medal at the 1993 European Championships.

== Amateur highlights ==
- 1993: World Championships in Tampere, Finland as a Light Welterweight:
  - Defeated Vukasin Dobrasinovic (Yugoslavia) 12–2
  - Lost to Hector Vinent (Cuba) RSC 2
- 1993: 1st place at Mediterranean Games in Narbonne, France as a Light Welterweight:
  - Defeated Fathi Missaoui (Tunisia) points
  - Defeated Nordine Mouchi (France) points
  - Defeated Laureano Leyva (Spain) 4–2
- 1993: Winner at the European Championships in Bursa, Turkey as a Light Welterweight:
  - Defeated Jason Williams (Gal) 14–3
  - Defeated Peter Richardson (England) 8–5
  - Defeated Nordine Mouchi (France) 10–6
  - Defeated Armen Gevorkian (Armenia) 12–3
  - Defeated Oktay Urkal (Germany) 5–2
- 1995: 2nd place at World Championships in Berlin, Germany as a Light Welterweight:
  - Defeated Zoran Didanovic (Yugoslavia) 8–4
  - Defeated Besik Vardzelashvili (Georgia) 5–8
  - Defeated Bulat Niazymbetov (Kazakhstan) 9–4
  - Defeated Oktay Urkal (Germany) 10–3
  - Lost to Hector Vinent (Cuba) 4–7
- 1996: 2nd place at European Championships in Vejle, Denmark as a Light Weltwerweight:
  - Defeated Gabriel Oida (Romania) 14–12
  - Defeated Joszef Matolcsi (Hungary) 5–0
  - Defeated Nordine Mouchi (France) 11–8
  - Defeated Radoslav Suslekov (Bulgaria) 6–4
  - Lost to Oktay Urkal (Germany) 4–6
- 1996: Represented Turkey at the Olympic Games in Atlanta as a Light Welterweight:
  - Defeated Aboubacar Diallo (Guinea) 21–5
  - Lost to Hector Vinent (Cuba) 1–23
- 1997: Competed in the World Championships in Budapest, Hungary as a Light Welterewight:
  - Lost to Benameur Meskine (Algeria) 3–5
- 1998: 2nd place at European Championships in Minsk, Belarus as a Light Welterweight:
  - Defeated Mehmet Erarslan (Denmark) 8–2
  - Defeated Jacek Bielski (Poland) 8–2
  - Defeated Sergey Bykovsky (Belarus) 6–3
  - Lost to Dorel Simion (Romania) 3–9
- 1999: Competed at the World Championships in Houston, United States as a Welterweight:
  - Lost to Lucian Bute (Romania) 5–9
- 2000: 3rd place at European Championships in Tampere, Finland as a Light Welterweight:
  - Defeated Spiridon Ioanidis (Greece) 6–3
  - Defeated Mariusz Cendrowski (Poland) 6–2
  - Lost to Alex Leonev (Russia) 6–11
- 2000: Represented Turkey at the Olympic Games in Sydney, Australia as a Light Welterweight:
  - Defeated Michael Strange (Canada) 9–3
  - Lost to Sergey Bykovsky (Belarus) 38–40

== Professional record ==
16 Wins (8 knockouts, 8 decisions), 9 Losses (4 knockouts, 5 decisions)
Res.	Record	Opponent	Type	Rd., Time	Date	Location	Notes
Loss	16-9	(Mexico) Juan de la Rosa	TKO	6 (10), 2:30	2007-07-20	Casa de Amistad, Harlingen, Texas, United States	Originally for IBA middleweight title. De La Rosa missed weight; thus ineligible to win title.
Loss	16-8	(Nicaragua) Jose Varela	KO	2 (8), 0:54	2007-03-03	Roberto Clemente Coliseum, San Juan, Puerto Rico	
Loss	16-7	(Mexico) Gabriel Martínez	TKO	7 (8), 2:00	2007-01-12	Far West Center, Odessa, Texas, United States	
Loss	16-6	(Nigeria) Eromosele Albert	UD	10	2006-11-11	Club Cinema, Pompano Beach, Florida, United States	
Loss	16-5	(United States) Nick Acevedo	UD	6	2006-09-26	Staples Center, Los Angeles, California, United States	
Loss	16-4	(United States) Terrance Cauthen	UD	12	2006-06-03	Sovereign Bank Arena, Trenton, New Jersey, United States	For the IBU super welterweight title.
Win	16-3	(Thailand) Lookton Jaytrong	KO	3 (6)	2005-10-14	Baluan Sholak Sports Palace, Almaty, Kazakhstan	
Loss	15-3	(Puerto Rico) Carlos Quintana	TKO	4 (10), 2:33	2005-02-25	Buffalo Run Casino, Miami, Florida, United States	
Loss	15-2	(Ukraine) Artur Atadzhanov	SD	8	2004-11-18	Michael's Eighth Avenue, Glen Burnie, Maryland, United States	
Win	15-1	(United States) Thomas Davis	TKO	9 (10), 2:57	2004-09-24	Sovereign Bank Arena, Trenton, New Jersey, United States	
Loss	14-1	(United States) David Estrada	UD	12	2004-07-15	Chumash Casino Resort, Santa Ynez, California, United States	For vacant USBA welterweight title.
Win	14-0	(Armenia) Archak TerMeliksetian	TKO	6 (8), 2:41	2004-04-17	Pechanga Resort & Casino, Temecula, California, United States	
Win	13-0	(Mexico) Jesús Soto Karass	UD	12	2004-01-15	Arena Theatre, Houston, Texas, United States	Won vacant WBA Fedecentro super welterweight title.
Win	12-0	(Puerto Rico) Jose Medina	TKO	8 (10), 2:59	2003-07-15	Playboy Mansion, Beverly Hills, California, United States	
Win	11-0	(United States) Charles Clark	UD	8	2003-06-19	Michael's Eighth Avenue, Glen Burnie, Maryland, United States	
Win	10-0	(Puerto Rico) Jose Aponte	UD	6	2003-05-03	World's Gym, Philadelphia, Pennsylvania, United States	
Win	9-0	(Kenya) Joshua Onyango	UD	6	2003-03-20	Michael's Eighth Avenue, Glen Burnie, Maryland, United States	
Win	8-0	(Puerto Rico) Sal Lopez	UD	6	2003-01-25	Bally's Park Place, Atlantic City, New Jersey, United States	
Win	7-0	(United States) Vernon Meeks	TKO	1 (4)	2003-01-09	Zembo Shrine Building, Harrisburg, Pennsylvania, United States	
Win	6-0	(United States) Abel Hernandez	TKO	3 (6), 1:05	2002-09-06	Convention Center, Pharr, Texas, United States	
Win	5-0	(United States) Anthony Wilson	UD	6	2002-06-04	Wyndham Hotel, Houston, Texas, United States	
Win	4-0	(United States) Larry Kenney	UD	4	2002-03-29	Prairie View A&M University, Prairie View, Texas, United States	
Win	3-0	(Belize) Michael Soberanis	TKO	2 (4), 2:59	2002-02-12	Radisson Gulfview Hotel, Houston, Texas, United States	
Win	2-0	(United States) Charles Sims	TKO	1 (4), 2:52	2001-09-22	Moody Gardens, Galveston, Texas, United States	
Win	1-0	(United States) Abel Hernandez	UD	4	2001-04-19	Radisson Astrodome Hotel, Houston, Texas, United States	
