= Algeria at the 2000 Summer Olympics =

- IOC code: ALG
- NOC: Algerian Olympic Committee
- Website: www.coa.dz

in Sydney
- Competitors: 47 (37 men and 10 women) in 10 sports
- Flag bearer: Djabir Saïd-Guerni
- Medals Ranked 42nd: Gold 1 Silver 1 Bronze 3 Total 5

Summer Olympics appearances (overview)
- 1964; 1968; 1972; 1976; 1980; 1984; 1988; 1992; 1996; 2000; 2004; 2008; 2012; 2016; 2020; 2024

Other related appearances
- France (1896–1960)

Algeria competed at the 2000 Summer Olympics in Sydney, Australia. 47 competitors, 37 men and 10 women, took part in 42 events across 10 sports.

== Medalists ==
Medal	Name	Sport	Event	Date
Gold	Nouria Merah-Benida	Athletics	Women's 1500 metres	30 September
Silver	Ali Saidi-Sief	Athletics	Men's 5000 metres	30 September
Bronze	Abderrahmane Hammad	Athletics	Men's high jump	24 September
Bronze	Djabir Saïd-Guerni	Athletics	Men's 800 metres	27 September
Bronze	Mohamed Allalou	Boxing	Men's light-welterweight	29 September

Medals by sport
Sport	1st place, gold medalist(s)	2nd place, silver medalist(s)	3rd place, bronze medalist(s)	Total
Athletics	1	1	2	4
Boxing	0	0	1	1
Total	1	1	3	5

== Competitors ==
The following is the list of number of competitors in the Games.

Sport	Men	Women	Total
Athletics	16	5	21
Boxing	7	–	7
Fencing	0	2	2
Gymnastics	1	0	1
Judo	6	1	7
Rowing	1	1	2
Swimming	2	0	2
Table tennis	2	0	2
Weightlifting	0	1	1
Wrestling	2	0	2
Total	37	10	47

== Athletics ==
Key

- Note–Ranks given for track events are within the athlete's heat only
- Q = Qualified for the next round
- q = Qualified for the next round as a fastest loser or, in field events, by position without achieving the qualifying target
- NR = National record
- N/A = Round not applicable for the event
- Bye = Athlete not required to compete in round

Men
Track and road events

Athletes	Events	Heat Round 1		Heat Round 2		Semifinal		Final	
Athletes	Events	Time	Rank	Time	Rank	Time	Rank	Time	Rank
Malik Louahla	400 metres	46.06	4	did not advance					
Djabir Saïd-Guerni	800 metres	1:47.95	2 Q	N/A		1:44.19	1 Q	1:45.16	3rd place, bronze medalist(s)
Adem Hecini	800 metres	1:47.62	2 Q	N/A		1:45.08	3	did not advance	
Noureddine Morceli	1500 metres	3:38.41	2 Q	N/A		4:00.78	12	did not advance	
Kamel Boulahfane	1500 metres	3:39.01	3 Q	N/A		3:43.98	11	did not advance	
Mohamed Khaldi	1500 metres	3:41.16	8	N/A		did not advance			
Ali Saïdi-Sief	5000 metres	13:29.24	1 Q	N/A				13:36.20	2nd place, silver medalist(s)
Reda Benzine	5000 metres	13:23.10 SB	4 Q	N/A				13:40.95	11
Samir Moussaoui	10,000 metres	28:08.22	6 Q	N/A				28:17.25	16
Malik-Khaled Louahla; Kamel Talhaoui; Samir-Adel Louahla; Adem Hecini	4 × 400 metres relay	DQ		did not advance					
Laid Bessou	3000 metres steeplechase	8:21.14	1 Q	N/A				8:33.07	11
Mourad Benslimani	3000 metres steeplechase	8:59.07	11	N/A				did not advance	
Moussa Aouanouk	20 kilometres walk	N/A						1:25:04	23
Kamal Kohil	Marathon	N/A						2:17:46	23

Field events

Athlete	Event	Qualification		Final	
Athlete	Event	Distance	Position	Distance	Position
Abderrahmane Hammad	High jump	2.27	4 q	2.32	3rd place, bronze medalist(s)

Women
Track & road events

Athletes	Events	Heat Round 1		Heat Round 2		Semifinal		Final	
Athletes	Events	Time	Rank	Time	Rank	Time	Rank	Time	Rank
Nouria Merah-Benida	1500 metres	4:10.24	2 Q	N/A		4:05.24	1 Q	4:05.10	1st place, gold medalist(s)
Nasria Baghdad	10,000 metres	35:31.53	20	N/A				did not advance	
Bahia Boussad	20 kilometres walk	N/A						1:52.50	45

Field events

Athlete	Event	Qualification		Final	
Athlete	Event	Distance	Position	Distance	Position
Baya Rahouli	Triple jump	13.98	12 q	14.17	5

Combined events – Heptathlon

Athlete	Event	100H	HJ	SP	200 m	LJ	JT	800 m	Final	Rank
Yasmina Azzizi	Result	13.64	1.60	14.17	24.59	5.88	46.28	2:21.82	5896 SB	17
Yasmina Azzizi	Points	1030	736	805	925	813	788	799	5896 SB	17

== Boxing ==
Men

Athlete	Event	Round of 32	Round of 16	Quarterfinals	Semifinals	Final	
Athlete	Event	Opposition Result	Opposition Result	Opposition Result	Opposition Result	Opposition Result	Rank
Mebarek Soltani	Light flyweight	Romero (MEX); L 15–16	did not advance				
Nacer Keddam	Flyweight	Kooner (CAN); L 11–18	did not advance				
Hichem Blida	Bantamweight	Cruz (PUR); W 11–10	Rahimov (UZB); L 8–17	did not advance			
Nouzeddine Medjehoud	Featherweight	Mathebula (RSA); L 5–10	did not advance				
Mohamed Allalou	Light welterweight	Konečný (CZE); W 17–9	Neequaye (GHA); W 15–6	Paris (ITA); W 22–8	Abdoollayev (UZB); L 7–20	Did not advance	3rd place, bronze medalist(s)
Abdelhani Kenzi	Middleweight	Diaconu (ROU); L 9–19	did not advance				
Mohamed Azzaoui	Heavyweight	Bye	Chanet (FRA); L 21–22	did not advance			

== Fencing ==
Athlete	Event	Round of 64	Round of 32	Round of 16	Quarterfinal	Semifinal	Final / BM	
Athlete	Event	Opposition Score	Opposition Score	Opposition Score	Opposition Score	Opposition Score	Opposition Score	Rank
Wassila Rédouane-Saïd-Guerni	Women's foil	Arai (JPN); L 3–15	did not advance					
Zahra Gamir	Women's épée	Stevens (USA); L 2–5	did not advance					

== Judo ==
Men

Athlete	Event	Round of 32	Round of 16	Quarterfinals	Semifinals	Repechage 1	Repechage 2	Repechage 3	Final / BM	
Athlete	Event	Opposition Result	Opposition Result	Opposition Result	Opposition Result	Opposition Result	Opposition Result	Opposition Result	Opposition Result	Rank
Omar Rebahi	−60 kg	Jacinto (DOM); W	Mukhtarov (UZB); L	did not advance		Labrosse (SEY); W	Ismayilov (AZE); L	did not advance		
Amar Meridja	−66 kg	Ottiano (USA); L	did not advance							
Noureddine Yagoubi	−73 kg	Denanyoh (TOG); W	Camilo (BRA); L	did not advance		Offer (ISR); W	Almeida (POR); L	did not advance		
Khaled Meddah	−90 kg	Hachicha (TUN); L	did not advance							
Sami Belgroun	−100 kg	Jang (KOR); W	Traineau (FRA); L	did not advance		Stepkine (RUS); L	did not advance			
Mohamed Bouaichaoui	+100 kg	Hernandes (BRA); L	did not advance							

Women

Athlete	Event	Round of 32	Round of 16	Quarterfinals	Semifinals	Repechage 1	Repechage 2	Repechage 3	Final / BM	
Athlete	Event	Opposition Result	Opposition Result	Opposition Result	Opposition Result	Opposition Result	Opposition Result	Opposition Result	Opposition Result	Rank
Salima Souakri	−52 kg	Clement (BEL); W	Schmutz (SUI); W	Narazaki (JPN); L	did not advance		Baillargeon (CAN); W	Aluaș (ROU); L	did not advance	

== Rowing ==
Athlete	Event	Heats		Repechage		Semifinals		Final	
Athlete	Event	Time	Rank	Time	Rank	Time	Rank	Time	Rank
Rafik Amrane	Men's single sculls	7:44.48	5 R	7:42.17	4 SC/D	7:38.51	4 FD	7:35.66	21
Samia Hireche	Women's single sculls	8:28.65	5 R	8:21.67	4 SC/D	8:18.16	4 FC	8:12.89	17

Qualification Legend: FA=Final A (medal); FB=Final B (non-medal); FC=Final C (non-medal); FD=Final D (non-medal); FE=Final E (non-medal); FF=Final F (non-medal); SA/B=Semifinals A/B; SC/D=Semifinals C/D; SE/F=Semifinals E/F; R=Repechage

== Swimming ==
Athlete	Event	Heat		Semifinal		Final	
Athlete	Event	Time	Rank	Time	Rank	Time	Rank
Salim Iles	Men's 50 m freestyle	22.95	22	did not advance			
Salim Iles	Men's 100 m freestyle	49.70 NR	8 Q	49.70 =NR	7	did not advance	
Mehdi Addadi	Men's 100 metre butterfly	56.04	44	did not advance			
Mehdi Addadi	Men's 100 metre backstroke	58.74	46	did not advance			
Kenza Bennaceur	Women's 100 metre butterfly	DNS		did not advance			

== Table tennis ==
Athlete	Event	Preliminary round	Group stage	Round of 16	Quarterfinals	Semifinals	Final / BM	
Athlete	Event	Opposition Result	Opposition Result	Opposition Result	Opposition Result	Opposition Result	Opposition Result	Rank
David Kaci; Farid Oulami	Men's doubles	Hoyama / Kawai (BRA); L 0–2	did not advance					

== Trampolining ==
Athlete	Event	Qualification		Final	
Athlete	Event	Score	Rank	Score	Rank
Ali Bourai	Men's	62.60		did not advance	

== Weightlifting ==
Athlete	Event	Snatch		Clean & Jerk		Total	Rank
Athlete	Event	Result	Rank	Result	Rank	Total	Rank
Leila Lassouani	Women's 58 kg	60.0	16	82.5	14	142.5	14

== Wrestling ==
Key:

- VT – Victory by Fall.
- PP – Decision by Points – the loser with technical points.
- PO – Decision by Points – the loser without technical points.

Men's Greco-Roman

Athlete	Event	Elimination Pool				Quarterfinal	Semifinal	Final / BM	
Athlete	Event	Opposition Result	Opposition Result	Opposition Result	Rank	Opposition Result	Opposition Result	Opposition Result	Rank
Yassine Djakrir	−63 kg	Manukyan (KAZ); L 0–4 ^{ST}	Singh (IND); L 0–3 ^{PO}	Maren (CUB); L 1–3 ^{PP}	4	did not advance			18
Kader Slila	−76 kg	Erofaylov (UZB); L 0–3 ^{PO}	Lindland (USA); L 0–4 ^{PA}	Melelashvili (GEO); L 0–4 ^{PA}	4	did not advance			20

== See also ==
- Algeria at the 2000 Summer Paralympics

== Notes ==
- Wallechinsky, David (2004). The Complete Book of the Summer Olympics (Athens 2004 Edition). Toronto, Canada. ISBN 1-894963-32-6.
- International Olympic Committee (2001). The Results. Retrieved 12 November 2005.
- Sydney Organising Committee for the Olympic Games (2001). Official Report of the XXVII Olympiad Volume 1: Preparing for the Games. Retrieved 20 November 2005.
- Sydney Organising Committee for the Olympic Games (2001). Official Report of the XXVII Olympiad Volume 2: Celebrating the Games. Retrieved 20 November 2005.
- Sydney Organising Committee for the Olympic Games (2001). The Results. Retrieved 20 November 2005.
- International Olympic Committee Website
