= Ricardo Williams (boxer) =

American boxer

Ricardo Williams Jr.

Personal information
- Nickname: Slicky Ricky
- Nationality: American
- Born: Ricardo Williams Jr. June 25, 1981 (age 45) Cincinnati, Ohio
- Height: 5 ft 10 in (178 cm)
- Weight: Welterweight

Boxing career
- Stance: Orthodox

Boxing record
- Total fights: 26
- Wins: 22
- Win by KO: 12
- Losses: 3
- Draws: 0
- No contests: 1
Medal record
Amateur boxing
Representing United States
Olympic Games
Silver medal – second place	2000 Sydney	-63.5 kg
Goodwill Games
Gold medal – first place	1998 New York	-63.5 kg

Ricardo Williams Jr. (born June 25, 1981) is an American professional boxer. Williams won a Light Welterweight Silver Medal at the 2000 Olympic Games, and turned pro in the following year and was immediately dubbed as a future star in the sport and the best fighter to come out of the 2000 games.

== Amateur career ==
Williams began boxing at the age of eight, taking after his father, a Vietnam War veteran who had over 80 amateur bouts of his own. He had a stellar amateur career. His highlights include:

- 1998 United States Amateur Light welterweight champion
- 1998 National Golden Gloves Light welterweight champion
- 1999 United States Amateur Light welterweight champion
- Represented the United States as a Light welterweight at the 2000 Sydney Olympic games, winning a silver medal. His results were:
  - Defeated Henry Collins (Australia) RSC 4
  - Defeated Ajose Olusegun (Nigeria) RSC 4
  - Defeated Aleksandr Leonov (Russia) 17-12
  - Defeated Diógenes Luña (Cuba) 42-41
  - Lost to Mohamad Abdulaev (Uzbekistan) 20-27

== Professional career ==
Known as "Slicky Ricky", Williams was an extremely talented fighter with power in both fists, but quickly became known for his uninspired performances as a pro. Two years after turning pro, Williams tendency to undertrain hurt him severely, as he dropped a unanimous decision to unheralded Juan Valenzuela. The following year, fighting 11 pounds higher than when he had turned pro, Williams turned in yet another disappointing performance against journeyman Manning Galloway, and lost a split decision.

== Criminal conviction ==
Rather than going on to win the expected title belt, in 2005 Williams was sentenced to three years in prison for his part in a conspiracy to distribute cocaine shipped to Cincinnati via FedEx.

== Return to boxing ==
After serving 31 months of his sentence, Williams was released from prison and resumed his boxing training. He won 9 in a row, beginning with a June 2008 stoppage of Sebastian Hamel in just 91 seconds of a welterweight bout, before Williams faced Carson Jones for the USBA welterweight title. Jones knocked Williams down once in the third round and twice in the fourth before the fight was waved off by referee Steve Smoger. Williams added two more wins to his record in 2012 and another in 2014 before retiring at 22–3.

Beat Jay Paquette in the semifinals, 21- 18 ==References==
