= Boxing at the 1998 Asian Games – Men's 63.5 kg =

Boxing competitions

Men's 63.5 kg at the 1998 Asian Games
- Venue: Land Sports Complex
- Date: 9–18 December 1998
- Competitors: 16 from 16 nations

Medalists
gold medal	Muhammad Abdullaev	Uzbekistan
silver medal	Willem Papilaya	Indonesia
bronze medal	Pongsak Rientuanthong	Thailand
bronze medal	Densmaagiin Enkhsaikhan	Mongolia

The men's light welterweight boxing competition at the 1998 Asian Games in Bangkok, Thailand was held from 9 to 18 December at the Land Sports Complex.

Like all Asian Games boxing events, the competition was a straight single-elimination tournament. This event consisted of 16 boxers. The competition began with the round of 16 on 9 December, where the number of competitors was reduced to 8, and concluded with the final on 18 December. Both semi-final losers were awarded bronze medals.

All bouts consisted of five three-minute rounds. The boxers receive points for every successful punch they land on their opponent's head or upper body. The boxer with the most points at the end of the bouts wins. If a boxer is knocked to the ground and cannot get up before the referee counts to 10 then the bout is over and the opponent wins.

== Schedule ==
All times are Indochina Time (UTC+07:00)

Date	Time	Event
Wednesday, 9 December 1998	14:00	Round of 16
Friday, 11 December 1998	14:00	Quarterfinals
Tuesday, 15 December 1998	14:00	Semifinals
Friday, 18 December 1998	14:00	Final

== Results ==
Legend

- RSCH — Won by referee stop contest head blow
- RSCO — Won by referee stop contest outclassed

Round of 16
Reynaldo Galido (PHI)	RSCH
Kim Seung-tae (KOR)
Muhammad Abdullaev (UZB)	19
Ri Chol (PRK)	6
Pongsak Rientuanthong (THA)	17
Bakyt Bagaliev (KGZ)	10
Ayman Al-Nadi (JOR)	RSCO
Ali Abdalshafi (PLE)
Lu Zongwei (CHN)	17
Daniyar Munaytbasov (KAZ)	6
Willem Papilaya (INA)	18
Babak Moghimi (IRI)	10
Densmaagiin Enkhsaikhan (MGL)	RSCO
Khamsavath Vilayphone (LAO)
Yasuyuki Takahashi (JPN)	21
Yousif Massas (SYR)	8

Quarterfinals
Reynaldo Galido (PHI)
Muhammad Abdullaev (UZB)	RSCO
Pongsak Rientuanthong (THA)	16
Ayman Al-Nadi (JOR)	5
Lu Zongwei (CHN)
Willem Papilaya (INA)	RSCH
Densmaagiin Enkhsaikhan (MGL)	RSCH
Yasuyuki Takahashi (JPN)

Semifinals
Muhammad Abdullaev (UZB)	15
Pongsak Rientuanthong (THA)	2
Willem Papilaya (INA)	+11
Densmaagiin Enkhsaikhan (MGL)	11

Final
Muhammad Abdullaev (UZB)	17
Willem Papilaya (INA)	2
