= Bulat Niyazymbetov =

Kazakhstani boxer (born 1972)

Medal record

Representing Kazakhstan

Men's Boxing

Olympic Games
Bronze medal – third place	1996 Atlanta	Light Welterweight

Asian Games
Bronze medal – third place	1994 Hiroshima	Light Welterweight

Bolat Niyazymbetov (born September 19, 1972) is a Kazakhstani Light Welterweight boxer. He won a bronze medal in the 1996 Summer Olympics.

== Olympic results ==
- Defeated Carlos Martínez (Mexico) 25-3
- Defeated Davis Mwale (Zambia) 11-3
- Defeated Babak Moghimi (Iran) 13-8
- Lost to Héctor Vinent (Cuba) 6-23
