= Kelson Pinto =

Brazilian boxer (born 1976)

Personal information
- Born: Kelson Carlos Santos Pinto; 26 November 1976 (age 49) Aracaju, Sergipe, Brazil
- Height: 5 ft 10 1/2 in (179 cm)
- Weight: Light welterweight

Boxing career
- Stance: Orthodox

Boxing record
- Total fights: 26
- Wins: 24
- Win by KO: 22
- Losses: 2
Medal record
Men's boxing
Representing Brazil
Pan American Games
Silver medal – second place	1999 Winnipeg	Light welterweight

Kelson Carlos Santos Pinto (born November 26, 1976) is a Brazilian former professional boxer and world title challenger. As an amateur, he won a silver medal at the 1999 Pan American Games and represented Brazil at the 2000 Summer Olympics.

== Amateur career ==
Pinto represented his native country in the light welterweight division at the 2000 Summer Olympics. He was eliminated in the second round by Uzbekistan's eventual gold medalist Mahammatkodir Abdoollayev.

=== Olympic results ===
  - Defeated Ghulam Shabbir (Pakistan) RSC 4
  - Lost to Mohamad Abdulaev (Uzbekistan) RSC 4

== Professional career ==
Pinto turned professional in 2000 and won various regional titles in the Americas. He remained undefeated until fighting Miguel Cotto (whom he had defeated twice as an amateur) for the WBO junior welterweight title in 2004, in which Cotto defeated him by KO in 2004. In 2005, Pinto lost a technical decision to former IBF junior welterweight champion Vince Phillips after an accidental headbutt which cut Phillips.

== Coaching career ==
Pinto has continued coaching boxing in Brazil and has coached multiple UFC fighters, most notably, former UFC Middleweight title challenger Paulo Costa.

== Professional boxing record ==
26 fights	24 wins	2 losses
By knockout	22	1
By decision	2	1

No.	Result	Record	Opponent	Type	Round, time	Date	Location	Notes
26	Win	24–2	Adriano De Souza	TKO	1 (12)	Aug 4, 2006	Ginásio de Esportes Antônio Balbino, Salvador, Bahia, Brazil	
25	Loss	23–2	Vince Phillips	TD	5 (12)	Oct 13, 2005	Ontario Convention Center, Ontario, California, U.S.	For the WBC Continental Americas welterweight title; Majority TD after Phillips was cut from an accidental head clash.
24	Win	23–1	Cleber Leite	KO	1 (12)	Aug 5, 2005	Ginásio de Esportes Antônio Balbino, Salvador, Bahia, Brazil	
23	Win	22–1	Jose Marcos do Espirito Santo	KO	1 (12)	May 31, 2005	Salvador, Bahia, Brazil	
22	Loss	21–1	Miguel Cotto	TKO	6 (12), 3:00	Sept 11, 2004	José Miguel Agrelot Coliseum, Hato Rey, Puerto Rico	For the WBO light welterweight title
21	Win	21–0	Jose Otavio da Silva	TKO	1 (12)	Feb 27, 2004	Lauro de Freitas, Brazil	
20	Win	20–0	Nelson Felipe dos Santos	KO	1 (12)	Oct 3, 2003	Lauro de Freitas, Brazil	
19	Win	19–0	Emanuel Augustus	UD	10	June 17, 2003	Sundance Square, Fort Worth, Texas, U.S.	Augustus took the fight on short notice.
18	Win	18–0	Richard Savage	TKO	2 (12), 2:27	Feb 13, 2003	Don Haskins Center, El Paso, Texas, U.S.	For the vacant NABO light welterweight title.
17	Win	17–0	Victor Luis Ferreira	TKO	1 (12)	Dec 19, 2002	Ginásio de Esportes Antônio Balbino, Salvador, Bahia, Brazil	For the WBO Latino light welterweight title.
16	Win	16–0	Arturo Reyes	TKO	2 (12)	Nov 2, 2002	MGM Grand Garden Arena, Paradise, Nevada, U.S.	
15	Win	15–0	Nelson Felipe dos Santos	KO	2 (12)	Aug 29, 2002	AABB Arena, Recife, Brazil	
14	Win	14–0	Roger Benito Flores	TKO	2 (10)	July 25, 2002	Ginásio de Esportes Antônio Balbino, Salvador, Bahia, Brazil	
13	Win	13–0	Dagoberto Najera	UD	2 (10)	June 29, 2002	Arrowhead Pond, Anaheim, California, U.S.	
12	Win	12–0	Jose Otavio da Silva	TKO	2 (10)	June 9, 2002	Nilson Nelson Gymnasium, Brasília, Distrito Federal, Brazil	
11	Win	11–0	Luiz Ferreira	TKO	1 (6)	May 1, 2002	Ginasio Constantino Constancio Viera, Aracaju, Brazil	For the WBO Latino light welterweight title and the Brazilian light welterweight title (CNB version).
10	Win	10–0	Mauro Lucero	KO	2 (6)	Mar 30, 2002	Pomona, California, U.S.	
9	Win	9–0	Gustavo Tapia	KO	2 (6)	Mar 16, 2002	Bally's Las Vegas, Las Vegas, Nevada, U.S.	
8	Win	8–0	Ulisses Pereira	KO	1 (6)	Nov 16, 2001	Recife, Brazil	
7	Win	7–0	Dwayne Pope	KO	1 (4), 2:14	Sept 8, 2001	Lawlor Events Center, Reno, Nevada, U.S.	
6	Win	6–0	Jose Carlos Costa	KO	1 (10)	July 31, 2001	Lauro de Freitas, Brazil	For the CBB welterweight title.
5	Win	5–0	Anivaldo Bispo	KO	1 (6)	Apr 29, 2001	Salvador, Bahia, Brazil	
4	Win	4–0	Cirilo Coronel Campos	KO	1 (6)	Mar 31, 2001	Lauro de Freitas, Brazil	
3	Win	3–0	Balbino dos Santos	KO	1 (6)	Feb 20, 2001	--	
2	Win	2–0	Jose Inacio de Sa	KO	1 (6)	Jan 27, 2001	Nilson Nelson Gymnasium, Brasília, Distrito Federal, Brazil	
1	Win	1–0	Francisco Antonio Martinez	TKO	1 (4)	Dec 15, 2000	Centro de Espectaculos Modelo, Ciudad Obregon, Sonora, Mexico	Professional boxing debut.

Sporting positions
Regional boxing titles
Preceded by Luiz Ferreira	WBO Latino light welterweight champion May 1st, 2002 – February 13th, 2003; Vacated	Vacant Title next held by n/a
Preceded by Vacant	NABO light welterweight champion February 13th, 2003 – September 11th, 2004; Vacated	Succeeded by n/a
