= Gerry Legras =

Seychellois boxer (born 1966)

Personal information
- Nationality: Seychellois
- Born: 5 April 1966 (age 60)
- Height: 1.68 m (5 ft 6 in)
- Weight: 64 kg (141 lb)

Sport
- Sport: Boxing
- Weight class: Light welterweight
Medal record
Commonwealth Games
Silver medal – second place	1998 Kuala Lumpur	Light welterweight

Gerry Legras (born 5 April 1966) is a Seychellois former boxer.

Representing Seychelles at the men's light welterweight event in the 1996 Summer Olympics, Legras beat Colombian boxer Dairo Esalas by a score of 26–12 in the first round; he was defeated in round two by the Iranian pugilist Babak Moghimi, who made it as far as the semi-finals. Legras was more successful in the 1998 Commonwealth Games where he won a silver medal in the same event after losing in the final to Michael Strange from Canada. Previously, he represented Seychelles at the 1994 Commonwealth Games and 1990 Commonwealth Games. Since retiring from the ring, Gerry has taken up employment as a boxing coach.
