= Gymnastics at the 2000 Summer Olympics – Men's trampoline =

Men's trampoline at the Games of the XXVII Olympiad
- Venue: Sydney SuperDome
- Date: 23 September 2000
- Competitors: 12 from 12 nations

Medalists
1st place, gold medalist(s)		Alexander Moskalenko	Russia
2nd place, silver medalist(s)		Ji Wallace	Australia
3rd place, bronze medalist(s)		Mathieu Turgeon	Canada

The men's individual trampoline competition at the 2000 Summer Olympics in Sydney was held on 23 September at the Sydney SuperDome. This was the first Olympics where the trampoline competition was held. Alexander Moskalenko won the gold medal after coming out of retirement once trampoline was announced as an Olympic sport.

== Results ==
=== Qualification ===
Twelve entrants competed in the qualifying round, and the top eight advanced to the final round.

Rank	Athlete	Compulsory	Optional	Total	Notes
1	Alexander Moskalenko (RUS)	28.40	40.60	69.00	Q
2	David Martin (FRA)	28.60	39.80	68.40	Q
3	Dimitri Polyarush (BLR)	28.50	39.80	68.30	Q
4	Ji Wallace (AUS)	28.40	39.00	67.40	Q
5	Lee Brearley (GBR)	27.90	38.30	66.20	Q
6	Mathieu Turgeon (CAN)	27.90	38.20	66.10	Q
7	Alan Villafuerte (NED)	27.60	38.30	65.90	Q
8	Olexander Chernonos (UKR)	28.00	37.80	65.80	Q
9	Michael Serth (GER)	28.00	37.60	65.60	R1
10	Ali Bourai (ALG)	26.40	36.20	62.60	R2
11	Markus Wiesner (SUI)	26.60	35.70	62.30	
12	Daisuke Nakata (JPN)	26.70	26.50	53.20	

=== Final ===
Rank	Athlete	Poland	Brazil	Denmark	Australia	Portugal	Diff	Total
Gold medal	Alexander Moskalenko (RUS)	9.0	9.0	9.3	9.4	9.4	14.00	41.70
Silver medal	Ji Wallace (AUS)	8.5	8.7	8.3	8.4	8.4	14.00	39.30
Bronze medal	Mathieu Turgeon (CAN)	8.3	8.2	8.4	8.5	8.4	14.00	39.10
4	David Martin (FRA)	8.8	8.8	8.9	9.1	9.1	12.00	38.80
5	Dimitri Polyarush (BLR)	8.4	8.4	8.6	8.4	8.5	12.80	38.10
6	Lee Brearley (GBR)	8.4	8.5	8.3	8.3	8.4	12.80	37.90
7	Alan Villafuerte (NED)	5.6	5.5	5.5	5.6	5.7	10.90	27.60
8	Olexander Chernonos (UKR)	1.5	1.6	1.5	1.5	1.5	3.00	7.50
