= Michael Gillen =

Michael Gillen may refer to:

- Chick Gillen (1933–2020), Irish boxer
- Michael J. Gillen (1885–1942), American politician from New York
