= Cendrowski =

Surname list

Cendrowski is a surname. Notable people with the surname include:

- Mariusz Cendrowski (born 1977), Polish boxer
- Mark Cendrowski (born 1959), American television director
