= Niyazymbetov =

Niyazymbetov (Kazakh or Russian: Ниязымбетов) is a Turkic masculine surname, its feminine counterpart is Niyazymbetova. Notable people with the surname include:

- Adilbek Niyazymbetov (born 1989), Kazakh boxer
- Bulat Niyazymbetov (born 1972), Kazakh boxer
