= Sven Paris =

Italian boxer

Personal information
- Nickname: The White Warrior
- Nationality: Italy
- Born: December 17, 1980 (age 45) Frosinone, Italy
- Height: 1.70 m (5 ft 7 in)
- Weight: 63 kg (139 lb)

Sport
- Sport: Boxing
- Weight class: Light welterweight
- Club: Accademia Pugilistica Fiorentina

Sven Paris (born December 17, 1980) is an Italian amateur boxer who competed in the light welterweight division at the 2000 Summer Olympics.

== Olympic Games ==
2000 (as a light welterweight)

- Defeated Pongsak Rientuanthong (Thailand) 14–3
- Defeated Kay Huste (Germany) 17–11
- Lost to Mohamed Allalou (Algeria) 8-22
