= Zely dos Santos =

Brazilian boxer

Personal information
- Born: 9 April 1977 (age 47); Novo Cruzeiro, Brazil

Sport
- Sport: Boxing

Zely dos Santos (born 9 April 1977) is a Brazilian boxer. He competed in the men's light welterweight event at the 1996 Summer Olympics.
