= Hwang Sung-bum =

Korean male boxer

Personal information
- Nationality: South Korean
- Born: 5 August 1975 (age 49)

Sport
- Sport: Boxing

Hwang Sung-bum (born 5 August 1975) is a South Korean boxer. He competed in the men's light welterweight event at the 2000 Summer Olympics.
