= Boxing at the 1994 Goodwill Games =

- Location: (Russia) Saint Petersburg
- Start date: 23 July
- End date: 7 August

The boxing competition at the 1994 Goodwill Games was held in Saint Petersburg, Russia from 23 July to 7 August in Petrovsky Stadium.

== Medal winners ==
Event	Gold	Silver	Bronze
Light Flyweight (– 48 kilograms)	Manuel Mantilla; Cuba	Choi Yoon Wook; South Korea	Albert Guardado; United States Eric Morel; United States
Flyweight (– 51 kilograms)	Waldemar Font; Cuba	Carlos Navarro; United States	Roman Podoprigora; Russia Kikmatulla Ahmedov; Uzbekistan
Bantamweight (– 54 kilograms)	Vladislav Antonov; Russia	Enrique Carrion; Cuba	Timofey Skryabin; Moldova Raimkul Malakhbekov; Russia
Featherweight (– 57 kilograms)	Ramazi Paliani; Russia	Joel Casamayor; Cuba	Giovanni Giungato; Italy Claude Chinon; France
Lightweight (– 60 kilograms)	Paata Gvasalia; Russia	Heiko Hinz; Germany	Bruno Wartelle; France Larry Nicholson; United States
Light Welterweight (– 63,5 kilograms)	Hector Vinent; Cuba	(Turkey) Nurhan Suleymanoglu; Türkiye	Nordine Mouchi; France Oleg Saitov; Russia
Welterweight (– 67 kilograms)	Juan Hernandez Sierra; Cuba	Alexandr Shkalikov; Russia	Daniel Santos; Puerto Rico Hans Janssen; Netherlands
Light Middleweight (– 71 kilograms)	Sergey Karavayev; Russia	Juan Carlos Lemus; Cuba	Orhan Delibas; Netherlands Dirk Dzemski; Germany
Middleweight (– 75 kilograms)	Ariel Hernandez; Cuba	Shane Swartz; United States	Stephen Beets Jr. United States Aleksandr Lebziak; Russia
Light Heavyweight (– 81 kilograms)	Benjamin McDowell; United States	Dihosvany Vega; Cuba	Dmitriy Linkov; Belarus (Turkey) Yusuf Ozturk; Türkiye
Heavyweight (– 91 kilograms)	Felix Savon; Cuba	Sergey Mochalov; Russia	(Turkey) Sinan Samil Sam; Türkiye Peer Mueller; Germany
Super Heavyweight (+ 91 kilograms)	Aleksey Lezin; Russia	Lance Whitaker; United States	Erik Fuhrmann; Germany Ed Mahone; United States
