= Diógenes Luna =

Cuban boxer (born 1977)

Personal information
- Born: May 1, 1977 (age 49) Guantanamo, Cuba

Sport
- Sport: Boxing
Medal record
Men's Boxing
Representing Cuba
Olympic Games
Bronze medal – third place	2000 Sydney	Light Welterweight
World Amateur Championships
Gold medal – first place	2001 Belfast	Light Welterweight
Pan American Games
Bronze medal – third place	1999 Winnipeg	Light Welterweight
Central American and Caribbean Games
Gold medal – first place	1998 Maracaibo	Welterweight

Diógenes Luna Martínez (born May 1, 1977) is a boxer from Cuba, who won the bronze medal in the light welterweight division (– 63.5 kg) at the 2000 Summer Olympics in Sydney, Australia. In the semifinals he was defeated by eventual runner-up Ricardo Williams from the United States. A year later he won the world title at the 2001 World Amateur Boxing Championships in Belfast, Northern Ireland.

== Results ==
1998 Central American and Caribbean Games

- 1st round bye
- Defeated Kevin Placide (Trinidad) RSC-3
- Defeated Julio Jean (Haiti) RSC-1
- Defeated José Luis Zertuche (Mexico) +26:26

1999 Pan American Games

- 1st round bye
- Defeated Gibeon Gonzalez (Virgin Islands) RSC-1
- Lost to Victor Hugo Castro (Argentina) 3:6

2000 Olympic Games

- 1st round bye
- Defeated Willy Blain (France) 25:14
- Defeated Saleh Abdelbary Maksoud (Egypt) RSC-2
- Lost to Ricardo Williams, Jr. (United States) 41:42
