= Saleh Khoulef =

Egyptian boxer

Saleh Khoulef (born March 30, 1975) is an Egyptian boxer., He competed in the light welterweight division at the 2000 Summer Olympics. During the competition, he defeated Ukraine's Vyacheslav Senchenko in the second round, but was eliminated in the subsequent round.
