= Mohamed Allalou =

Algerian boxer (born 1973)

Personal information
- Nationality: Algeria
- Born: September 28, 1973 (age 52) Thénia, Algeria
- Height: 1.74 m (5 ft 9 in)
- Weight: 63 kg (139 lb)

Sport
- Sport: Boxing
- Weight class: Light Welterweight
Medal record
Olympic Games
Bronze medal – third place	2000 Sydney	Light Welter
All-Africa Games
Silver medal – second place	1999 Johannesburg	Light Welter
Mediterranean Games
Gold medal – first place	1997 Bari	Featherweight
Bronze medal – third place	2001 Tunis	Light Welter
African Amateur Championships
Gold medal – first place	2001 Port Louis	Light Welter
Gold medal – first place	2003 Yaoundé	Light Welter

Mohamed Allalou (born September 28, 1973) is an Algerian boxer (From Thénia in kabylia). He competed in the Men's Light Welterweight division at the 2000 Summer Olympics and won the bronze medal. He also twice participated in the Summer Olympics, starting in 1996.

== 1996 Olympic results ==
- Defeated Peter Bulinga (Kenya) 17–3
- Defeated Jacek Bielski (Poland) 19–8
- Lost to Fethi Missaoui (Tunisia) 15–16

== 2000 Olympic results ==
- Defeated Lukáš Konečný (Czech Republic) 17–9
- Defeated Ben Neequaye (Ghana) 15–6
- Defeated Sven Paris (Italy) 22–8
- Lost to Muhammad Abdullaev (Uzbekistan) RSC

== Career ==
=== Olympic Games ===
- (bronze) Olympic Games 2000 ( Sydney, Australia ) (- 64 kg)
- Quarter-finals OlympicGames1996 (Atlanta, USA) (- 63,5 kg )

=== African Amateur Boxing Championships ===
- (gold) African Amateur Boxing Championships 1998 ( Algiers, Algeria ) (- 63,5 kg )
- (gold) African Amateur Boxing Championships 2001 ( Port Louis, Mauritius) (- 63,5 kg )
- (gold) African Olympic Qualifications 1996 (- 60 kg)

=== Mediterranean Games ===
- (gold) Mediterranean Games 1997 ( Bari, Italy) (- 60 kg)
- (bronze) Mediterranean Games 2001 ( Tunis, Tunisia) (- 63,5 kg )

=== All-Africa Games ===
- (silver) All-Africa Games 1999 (Johannesburg, South Africa) (- 63,5 kg )

=== Pan Arab Games ===
- (gold) Pan Arab Games 1997 ( Beirut, Lebanon) (- 60 kg)
- (gold) Pan Arab Games 1999 (Amman, Jordan) (- 63,5 kg )

=== World Amateur Boxing Championships ===
- Preliminaries 1/32 World Amateur Boxing Championships 1997 ( Budapest, Hungary ) (- 60 kg)
- Preliminaries 1/16 World Amateur Boxing Championships 2001( Belfast, Northern Ireland) (- 63,5 kg )
- Preliminaries 1/32 World Amateur Boxing Championships 2003 (Bangkok, Thailand) (- 64 kg)

=== International tournaments ===
- (bronze) Giraldo Cordova Cardin Tournament (Camaguey, Cuba) 1996 (60 kg)
- (bronze) Muhammad Ali Cup ( Louisville, USA ) 1997 (60 kg)
- (gold) President's Cup ( Sanur (Bali), Indonesia ) 2000 (63,5 kg )
- (silver) Egyptian International Championships ( Cairo, Egypt ) 2002 (67 kg)
