= 1993 European Amateur Boxing Championships =

Boxing competitions

- Location: Bursa, Turkey
- Dates: 6–12 September
- Competitors: 197 from 32 nations

The Men's 1993 European Amateur Boxing Championships were held in Bursa, Turkey from September 6 to September 12. The 30th edition of the normally bi-annual competition, in which 197 fighters from 32 countries participated this time, was organised by the European governing body for amateur boxing, EABA.

== Medal table ==
* Host nation (Turkey)

| Rank | Nation | Gold | Silver | Bronze | Total |
|---|---|---|---|---|---|
| 1 | Bulgaria | 3 | 0 | 0 | 3 |
| 2 | Russia | 2 | 1 | 3 | 6 |
| 3 | Germany | 1 | 2 | 3 | 6 |
| 4 | Turkey* | 1 | 2 | 2 | 5 |
| 5 | Georgia | 1 | 2 | 1 | 4 |
| 6 | Poland | 1 | 1 | 0 | 2 |
| 7 | Romania | 1 | 0 | 2 | 3 |
| 8 | Azerbaijan | 1 | 0 | 0 | 1 |
| 8 | Lithuania | 1 | 0 | 0 | 1 |
| 10 | Netherlands | 0 | 2 | 0 | 2 |
| 11 | Hungary | 0 | 1 | 1 | 2 |
| 12 | Czech Republic | 0 | 1 | 0 | 1 |
| 13 | Armenia | 0 | 0 | 2 | 2 |
| 13 | Finland | 0 | 0 | 2 | 2 |
| 13 | Ukraine | 0 | 0 | 2 | 2 |
| 16 | Belarus | 0 | 0 | 1 | 1 |
| 16 | England | 0 | 0 | 1 | 1 |
| 16 | Greece | 0 | 0 | 1 | 1 |
| 16 | Ireland | 0 | 0 | 1 | 1 |
| 16 | Israel | 0 | 0 | 1 | 1 |
| 16 | Wales | 0 | 0 | 1 | 1 |
| Totals (21 entries) | | 12 | 12 | 24 | 48 |

== Medalists ==
| Event | Gold | Silver | Bronze |
|---|---|---|---|
| Light Flyweight (– 48 kg) | Daniel Petrov; Bulgaria | Pál Lakatos; Hungary | Mikko Mantere; Finland |
| Light Flyweight (– 48 kg) | Daniel Petrov; Bulgaria | Pál Lakatos; Hungary | Eduard Gaifulin; Russia |
| Flyweight (– 51 kg) | Rovshan Huseynov; Azerbaijan | Rico Kubat; Germany | Vladislav Neiman; Israel |
| Flyweight (– 51 kg) | Rovshan Huseynov; Azerbaijan | Rico Kubat; Germany | Kadir Yıldırım; Turkey |
| Bantamweight (– 54 kg) | Raimkul Malakhbekov; Russia | Robert Ciba; Poland | István Kovács; Hungary |
| Bantamweight (– 54 kg) | Raimkul Malakhbekov; Russia | Robert Ciba; Poland | Claudiu Cristache; Romania |
| Featherweight (– 57 kg) | Serafim Todorov; Bulgaria | Ramaz Paliani; Georgia | Vyacheslav Vlassov; Russia |
| Featherweight (– 57 kg) | Serafim Todorov; Bulgaria | Ramaz Paliani; Georgia | Paul Griffin; Ireland |
| Lightweight (– 60 kg) | Jacek Bielski; Poland | Tibor Rafael; Czech Republic | Paata Gvasalia; Georgia |
| Lightweight (– 60 kg) | Jacek Bielski; Poland | Tibor Rafael; Czech Republic | Mekhak Ghazaryan; Armenia |
| Light Welterweight (– 63.5 kg) | Nurhan Süleymanoğlu; Turkey | Oktay Urkal; Germany | Leonard Doroftei; Romania |
| Light Welterweight (– 63.5 kg) | Nurhan Süleymanoğlu; Turkey | Oktay Urkal; Germany | Armen Gevorkyan; Armenia |
| Welterweight (– 67 kg) | Vitalijus Karpačiauskas; Lithuania | Kenan Öner; Turkey | Andreas Otto; Germany |
| Welterweight (– 67 kg) | Vitalijus Karpačiauskas; Lithuania | Kenan Öner; Turkey | Michail Savičev; Belarus |
| Light Middleweight (– 71 kg) | Francisc Vaştag; Romania | Orhan Delibaş; Netherlands | Bert Schenk; Germany |
| Light Middleweight (– 71 kg) | Francisc Vaştag; Romania | Orhan Delibaş; Netherlands | Gussein Kurbanov; Russia |
| Middleweight (– 75 kg) | Dirk Eigenbrodt; Germany | Aleksandr Lebziak; Russia | Akın Kuloğlu; Turkey |
| Middleweight (– 75 kg) | Dirk Eigenbrodt; Germany | Aleksandr Lebziak; Russia | Oleksandr Davydenko; Ukraine |
| Light Heavyweight (– 81 kg) | Igor Kshinin; Russia | Sinan Şamil Sam; Turkey | Sven Ottke; Germany |
| Light Heavyweight (– 81 kg) | Igor Kshinin; Russia | Sinan Şamil Sam; Turkey | Rostyslav Zaulychnyi; Ukraine |
| Heavyweight (– 91 kg) | Georgi Kandelaki; Georgia | Don Diego Poeder; Netherlands | Danny Williams; England |
| Heavyweight (– 91 kg) | Georgi Kandelaki; Georgia | Don Diego Poeder; Netherlands | Georgios Stefanopoulos; Greece |
| Super Heavyweight (+ 91 kg) | Svilen Rusinov; Bulgaria | Zurab Sarsania; Georgia | Mika Kihlström; Finland |
| Super Heavyweight (+ 91 kg) | Svilen Rusinov; Bulgaria | Zurab Sarsania; Georgia | Kevin McCormack; Wales |
