= Armen Gevorkyan =

Armenian boxer

Medal record

Men's Boxing

Representing Armenia

European Championships
Bronze medal – third place	1993 Bursa	Light Welterweight

Armen Gevorkyan (Armenian: Արմեն Գևւորգյան) is an Armenian amateur boxer.

Gevorkyan won a bronze medal at the 1993 European Amateur Boxing Championships in the light welterweight division.
