= Oktay Urkal =

German boxer (born 1970)

Personal information
- Nickname: Cassius
- Nationality: German
- Born: 15 January 1970 (age 56) West Berlin, West Germany
- Height: 1.74 m (5 ft 8 1/2 in)
- Weight: Light welterweight Welterweight

Boxing career
- Reach: 170 cm (67 in)
- Stance: Orthodox

Boxing record
- Total fights: 42
- Wins: 38
- Win by KO: 12
- Losses: 4
Medal record
Men's boxing
Representing Germany
Olympic Games
Silver medal – second place	1996 Atlanta	Light welterweight
World Amateur Championships
Bronze medal – third place	1993 Tampere	Light welterweight
Bronze medal – third place	1995 Berlin	Light welterweight
European Amateur Championships
Gold medal – first place	1996 Vejle	Light welterweight
Silver medal – second place	1993 Bursa	Light welterweight

Oktay Urkal (born 15 January 1970) is a German former professional boxer. He is a former European super lightweight and welterweight champion, and a multiple time world title challenger.

== Amateur career ==
As an amateur, Urkal won the silver medal in the light welterweight division at the 1996 Summer Olympics in Atlanta, United States. His official results were:

- Defeated Reynaldo Galido (Philippines) 19-2
- Defeated David Diaz (United States) 14-6
- Defeated Nordine Mouichi (France) 19-10
- Defeated Fathi Missaoui (Tunisia) 20-6
- Lost to Hector Vinent (Cuba) 13-20

In the same year he captured the gold medal at the European Amateur Boxing Championships in Vejle, Denmark.

His Amateur Record was reportedly 184-27-5.

== Professional career ==
Urkal is of Turkish descent, and has a fight record of 38 wins and 4 defeats. He is the former WBC International Light-Welterweight, twice European Light-Welterweight and European Welterweight champion. Urkal has fought for the world title three times losing to Kostya Tszyu and twice to Vivian Harris. He won four straight after his defeat to Harris; this winning streak came to an end on 4 March 2007, when WBA Welterweight champion Miguel Cotto successfully defended his title when Urkal's corner threw in the towel, ending the fight. referee deducted a second point for a headbutt, leading Urkal's corner to believe he was being unfair.
