= Fred Kinuthia =

Kenyan boxer

Personal information
- Nationality: Kenyan
- Born: 10 May 1969 (age 55)

Sport
- Sport: Boxing

Fred Kinuthia (born 10 May 1969) is a Kenyan boxer. He competed in the men's light welterweight event at the 2000 Summer Olympics.
