= Tibor Rafael =

Slovak boxer

Personal information
- Born: 25 January 1970 Komárno, Czechoslovakia
- Died: 1 July 2014 (aged 44) Komárno, Slovakia
- Weight: Lightweight

Boxing career
Medal record
Men's amateur boxing
Representing Slovakia
World Championships
| Bronze medal – third place | 1993 Tampere | Lightweight |
Representing Czech Republic
European Championships
| Silver medal – second place | 1993 Bursa | Lightweight |

Tibor Rafael (25 January 1970 – 1 July 2014) was a Slovak boxer. He competed at the 1993 World Amateur Boxing Championships, winning the bronze medal in the lightweight event. He also competed at the 1993 European Amateur Boxing Championships, winning the silver medal in the lightweight (– 60 kg) event.

Tibor Rafael was born on 25 January 1970 in Komárno. He died on 1 July 2014 in Komárno, at the age of 44.
