= Eduard Zakharov =

Russian boxer

Personal information
- Born: 10 January 1975 Ukhta, Respublika Komi, Russia
- Died: 13 May 1997 (aged 22) Ukhta, Respublika Komi, Russia
- Height: 5 ft 10 in (178 cm)
- Weight: 150 lb (68 kg)

Boxing career

Eduard Zakharov (Russian: Эдуард Фёдорович Захаров; 10 January 1975 – 13 May 1997), with the full name Eduard Fyodorovich Zakharov, was a male boxer from Russia. He represented his native country at the 1996 Summer Olympics in Atlanta, Georgia, where he was stopped in the quarterfinals of the men's light-welterweight division (– 63,5 kg) by Cuba's eventual gold medalist Héctor Vinent.

During his career, he fought 295 fights, won 265, and achieved 22 wins in 28 fights internationally.

On 13 May 1997 Zakharov died from stab wounds in Ukhta, at the age of 22.

== Memory ==
In 2024 the Martial Arts Center named after Eduard Zakharov opened in Ukhta. The name was chosen by the residents of the city.

The annual All-Russian boxing tournament "Memorial of the Master of Sports of the international class E. Zakharov" is held in Ukhta.
