= Miguel Cotto vs. Kelson Pinto =

Boxing match

Night of Revenge
- Date: September 11, 2004
- Venue: José Miguel Agrelot Coliseum, Hato Rey, Puerto Rico
- Title(s) on the line: vacant WBO junior welterweight title

Tale of the tape
Boxer	Miguel Cotto	Kelson Pinto
Nickname	"Junito"	
Hometown	Caguas, Puerto Rico	Aracaju, Sergipe, Brazil
Pre-fight record	20–0 (16 KO)	20–0 (18 KO)
Age	23 years, 10 months	27 years, 9 months
Height	5 ft 8 in (173 cm)	5 ft 10 1/2 in (179 cm)
Weight	140 lb (64 kg)	139 lb (63 kg)
Style	Orthodox	Orthodox
Recognition	WBO; No. 2 Ranked Light Welterweight	WBO; No. 1 Ranked Light Welterweight

Result
- Cotto defeats Pinto by 6th round TKO

Miguel Cotto vs. Kelson Pinto, billed as Night of Revenge, was a professional boxing match contested on September 11, 2004, for the vacant WBO junior welterweight championship.

== Background ==
They had previously fought as amateurs, with Pinto beating the then 19-year-old Cotto. The September 11, 2004 fight was televised by HBO's Boxing After Dark from San Juan, Puerto Rico, as part of a doubleheader with Daniel Santos's rematch with Antonio Margarito.

== The fight ==
Pinto figured he could out box and out smart the younger and shorter Cotto, after all he had beaten him before. This proved to be a fatal mistake, as Cotto, hungry and eager to seek revenge and also not let his home crowd down started out beautifully and in the second round Pinto was floored with a right to the chin followed by a vicious left hook to the side of the head. The crowd was ecstatic, but the brave Pinto got up the canvas and survived the round. Pinto, after realizing that he was facing a vast improved Cotto with deadly power in both hands decided he would have to box, keeping Cotto away using his long jab, it worked well for most of the third and fourth rounds however Cotto would occasionally slip in a combination here and there.

The fifth round started out the same, and as Pinto's courage started to build up towards the end of the round he moved closer to Cotto and tried to trade with him. This proved to be fatal, and once again Cotto unloaded his artillery with at least five vicious punches including an upper cut that staggered the Brazilian, and on his way to the canvas Cotto's punching power and incredible speed would land one last punch as the Brazilian was dropped for the second time in the fight.

Saved by the bell Cotto did not waste any time when they came out for the sixth. He launched into full attack, landing a right hand to the jaw and unloading power punch after power punch against the helpless Brazilian who was trying hard to block punches to no success. One last left hook to the body dropped Pinto and referee Roberto Ramirez stopped the fight just as Pinto's corner was about to throw the towel.

== Undercard ==
Confirmed bouts:

== Broadcasting ==
Country	Broadcaster
United Kingdom	Sky Sports
United States	HBO

Preceded by vs. Lovemore N'dou	Miguel Cotto's bouts 11 September 2004	Succeeded by vs. Randall Bailey
Preceded by vs. Jose Otavio da Silva	Kelson Pinto's bouts 11 September 2004	Succeeded by vs. Jose Marcos do Espirito Santo
