= Sami Khelifi =

Tunisian boxer (born 1974)

Personal information
- Native name: سامي خليفي
- Born: January 1, 1974 (age 52)
- Height: 173 cm (5 ft 8 in)
- Weight: 63 kg (139 lb)

Sport
- Country: Tunisia
- Sport: Boxing
Medal record
Men's Boxing
Mediterranean Games
Silver medal – second place	2001 Tunis	Welterweight

Sami Khelifi (Arabic: سامي خليفي, January 1, 1974) is a boxer from Tunisia. He represented his native North African country at the 2000 Summer Olympics in Sydney, Australia. There he was stopped in the first round of the Men's Light-Welterweight (– 63.5 kg) competition by Russia's Aleksandr Leonov. Khelifi won a silver medal at the 2001 Mediterranean Games in Tunis, Tunisia.
