= Han Hyeong-min =

South Korean boxer

Personal information
- Nationality: South Korean
- Born: 7 January 1971 (age 54)

Sport
- Sport: Boxing

Han Hyeong-min (born 7 January 1971) is a South Korean boxer. He competed in the men's light welterweight event at the 1996 Summer Olympics.
