= Riadh Ghandri =

Tunisian volleyball player (born 1973)

Personal information
- Nationality: Tunisian
- Born: 18 February 1973 (age 52)

Sport
- Sport: Volleyball

Riadh Ghandri (born 18 February 1973) is a Tunisian volleyball player. He competed in the men's tournament at the 1996 Summer Olympics.
