= Carlos Martínez (boxer) =

Mexican boxer (born 1978)

Personal information
- Born: 29 September 1978 (age 46); Mexico City, Mexico

Sport
- Sport: Boxing

Carlos Martínez (born 29 September 1978) is a Mexican boxer. He competed in the men's light welterweight event at the 1996 Summer Olympics.
