= Pongsak Rientuanthong =

Thai boxer

- พงษ์ศักดิ์ เหรียญทวนทอง
- Boxing career
- Nationality: Thai
- Born: Pongsak Hrianthuanthong; March 28, 1974 Pak Nam Prasae, Rayong, Thailand
- Height: 171 cm (5 ft 7 in)
- Weight: Light welterweight
- Stance: Orthodox

Boxing record
- Total fights: 7
- Wins: 1
- Win by KO: 0
- Losses: 6
Medal record
Representing Thailand
Asian Games
Bronze medal – third place	1998 Bangkok	Light welterweight
Southeast Asian Games
Silver medal – second place	1999 Brunei Darussalam	Light welterweight
Silver medal – second place	2001 Kuala Lumpur	Light welterweight

Pongsak Hrianthuanthong (Thai: พงษ์ศักดิ์ เหรียญทวนทอง; born 28 March 1974) is a Thai boxer. He competed in the men's light welterweight event at the 2000 Summer Olympics.

Prior to this, he had an extensive background in Muay Thai, having begun training at the age of nine. He later moved to Bangkok to join Pinsinchai Gym, where he trained alongside renowned Muay Thai fighters such as Burklerk Pinsinchai, Saencherng Pinsinchai. Fighting under the name Prabpramlek Sitsantat or Prabpramlek Sitnarong, he went up against some of the leading Thai fighters of his era, including Sangtiennoi Sor.Rungroj, Saiyok Sorphayathai, Panmongkol Carryboy, Den Muangsurin, Rainbow Sor.Prantalay, Samkor Kiatmontep, Lamnamoon Sor.Sumalee, Rajasak Sor.Vorapin, Orono Por.MuangUbon, Mathee Jadeepitak, and Namkabuan Nongkeepahuyuth.

He went on to win the Rajadamnern Stadium Junior Lightweight Championship and successfully defended the title five times. He then switched to amateur boxing, representing the Royal Thai Navy, where he held the rank of Petty Officer First Class (PO1). He became a six-time Thai national champion, won a gold medal at the World Grand Prix in the Czech Republic and a gold medal at the King's Cup. He also won two SEA Games silver medals, controversially missing out on the gold medal in bouts held in Malaysia and Brunei. At the 13th Asian Games in Bangkok in 1998, he won a bronze medal before going on to compete at the 2000 Summer Olympics in Sydney, Australia, where he was eliminated in the first round after losing 5–3 to Kay Huste of Germany.

He subsequently turned professional, fighting a total of seven bouts. In his third professional fight, he lost a unanimous decision to Daudy Bahari, a local Indonesian fighter, in a challenge for the PABA Junior Welterweight Championship in 2005. He went on to fight four more times, losing all four bouts, and subsequently retired from professional boxing. In 2021, he opened a Muay Thai gym on the Kowloon side of Hong Kong, under the name "Ole Muay Thai and Fitness".
