= Besarion Vardzelashvili =

Georgian boxer

Personal information
- Nationality: Georgian
- Born: 27 October 1976 (age 48); Tbilisi, Georgian SSR, Soviet Union

Sport
- Sport: Boxing

Besarion Vardzelashvili, born 27 October 1976, is a Georgian boxer. He competed in the men's light welterweight event at the 1996 Summer Olympics.
