= Mohieddine Beni Daoud =

Tunisian racewalker

Personal information
- Nationality: Tunisian
- Born: 20 April 1976 (age 50)

Sport
- Sport: Athletics
- Event: Racewalking

Mohieddine Beni Daoud (born 20 April 1976) is a Tunisian racewalker. He competed in the men's 20 kilometres walk at the 1996 Summer Olympics.
