= Chick Gillen =

Irish boxer (1933–2020)

Michael "Chick" Gillen (1933 – 30 May 2020) was an Irish boxer and Connacht champion. He was also a finalist in the Irish Army senior boxing championships.

Gillen fought as a light welterweight and was a former army junior national boxing champion. Gillen formed the Holy Family Boxing Club in the 1960s and the Olympic Boxing Club in 1988. He was best known for training Francis Barrett, the first Traveller to reach the Olympics. Gillen trained over 28 national champions, including both junior and senior, and trained many international boxers. Gillen trained the Olympic Boxing members under street lamps because they had no training facilities. Gillen ran a barber shop when he was not working with amateur boxers in Galway. He closed his shop in 2008 after more than 45 years to better enjoy his farming and familial pursuits. He was the younger brother of the late Patrick Gillen, an Irish D-day veteran who received the Chevalier de la Legion d'Honneur award from France in 2014.

Gillen died at a nursing home in Galway on 30 May 2020, aged 87.
