= Ghulam Shabbir =

Pakistani boxer (born 1974)

Personal information
- Nationality: Pakistani
- Born: 25 April 1974 (age 50)

Sport
- Sport: Boxing

Ghulam Shabbir (born 25 April 1974) is a Pakistani boxer. He competed in the men's light welterweight event at the 2000 Summer Olympics.
