= Tarek Aouni =

Tunisian volleyball player (born 1971)

Personal information
- Nationality: Tunisian
- Born: 20 February 1971 (age 54)

Sport
- Sport: Volleyball

Tarek Aouni (born 20 February 1971) is a Tunisian volleyball player. He competed in the men's tournament at the 1996 Summer Olympics.
