= Atif Loukil =

Tunisian volleyball player (born 1974)

Personal information
- Nationality: Tunisian
- Born: 2 June 1974 (age 50)

Sport
- Sport: Volleyball

Atif Loukil (born 2 June 1974) is a Tunisian volleyball player. He competed in the men's tournament at the 1996 Summer Olympics.
