= Mohamed Baghdadi =

Tunisian volleyball player (born 1974)

Personal information
- Nationality: Tunisian
- Born: 13 June 1974 (age 51)

Sport
- Sport: Volleyball

Mohamed Baghdadi (born 13 June 1974) is a Tunisian volleyball player. He competed in the men's tournament at the 1996 Summer Olympics.
