= Peter Bulinga =

Kenyan boxer

Personal information
- Nationality: Kenyan
- Born: 29 December 1962 (age 62); Kenya

Sport
- Country: Kenya
- Sport: Boxing

Peter Bulinga is a Kenyan Olympic boxer. He represented his country in the light-welterweight division at the 1996 Summer Olympics. He lost his first bout against Mohamed Allalou.
