= Jacek Bielski =

Polish boxer

Personal information
- Nationality: Polish
- Born: 29 January 1972 (age 54) Elbląg, Poland

Sport
- Sport: Boxing
Medal record
Men's Boxing
Representing Poland
European Amateur Championships
Gold medal – first place	1993 Bursa	Lightweight

Jacek Bielski (born 29 January 1972) is a Polish boxer. He competed in the men's light welterweight event at the 1996 Summer Olympics.
