= Ali Bourai =

Algerian trampoline gymnast

Ali Bouraï
- Full name: Ali Bouraï
- Born: 5 May 1977 (age 49) Al-Jaza'ir, Algeria
- Height: 170 cm (5 ft 7 in)

Gymnastics career
- Discipline: Trampoline gymnastics
- Country represented: Algeria

Ali Bouraï (Arabic: علي بوراي; born on 5 May 1977) is an Algerian former trampoline gymnast. He had competed at the 2000 Summer Olympics in Sydney.
