= Mariusz Cendrowski =

Polish boxer

Personal information
- Nationality: Polish
- Born: 20 October 1977 (age 48) Lubin, Poland
- Height: 5 ft 10 in (1.78 m)
- Weight: Light middleweight; Middleweight

Boxing career
- Stance: Orthodox

Boxing record
- Total fights: 29
- Wins: 23
- Win by KO: 8
- Losses: 4
- Draws: 2

Mariusz Cendrowski (born 20 October 1977) is a Polish former professional boxer who competed from 2004 to 2012. As an amateur, he competed in the men's light welterweight event at the 2000 Summer Olympics.
