= Kay Huste =

German boxer (born 1974)

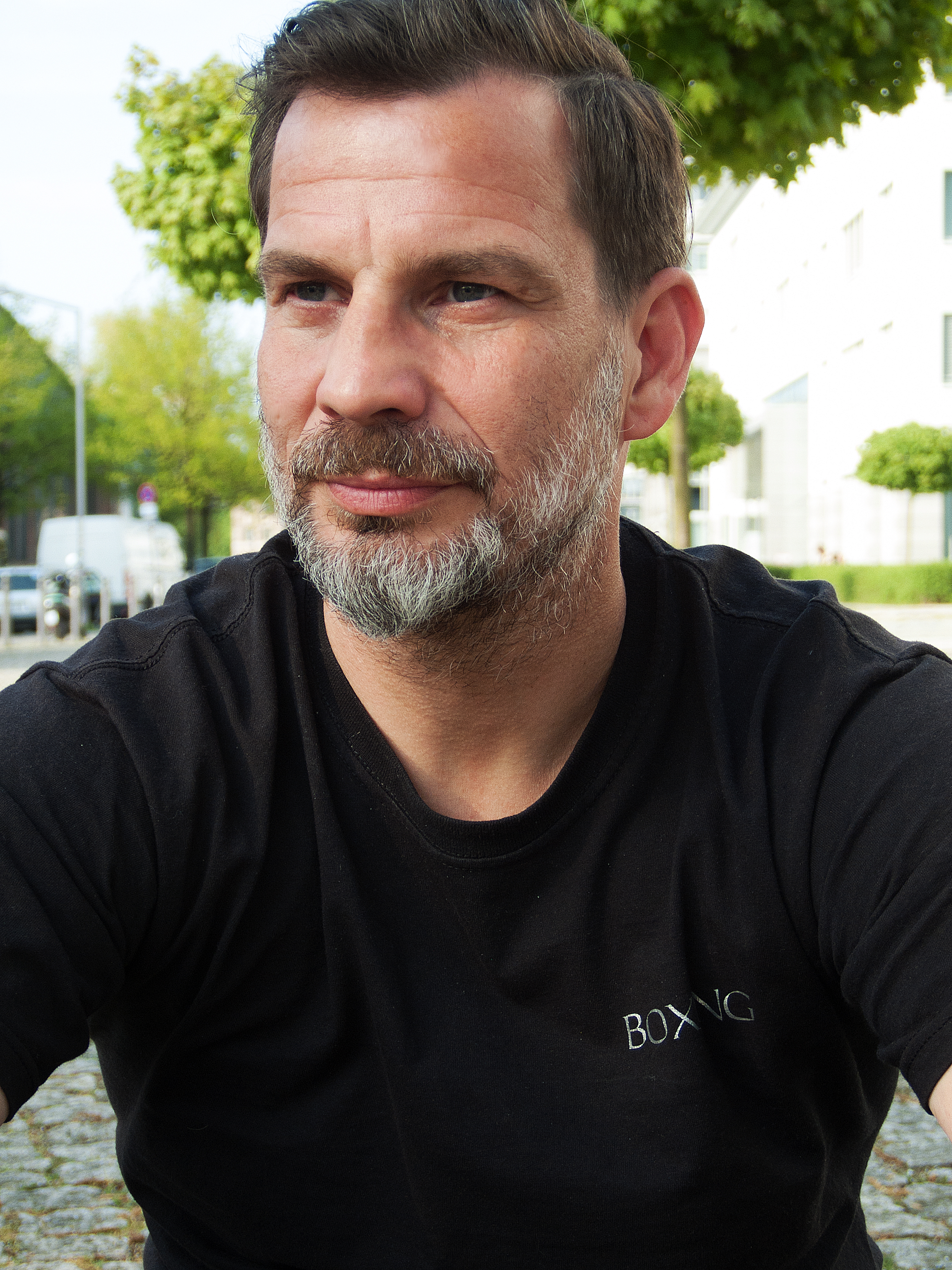
- Kay Huste

Personal information
- Nationality: German
- Born: 8 November 1974 (age 51) Frankfurt (Oder), East Germany
- Height: 176 cm (5 ft 9 in)
- Weight: lightweight light welterweight

Boxing career
Medal record
Representing Germany
Men's Boxing
European Amateur Championships
Gold medal – first place	1998 Minsk	Lightweight

Kay Huste (born 8 November 1974) is a German former boxer. He competed in the men's light welterweight event at the 2000 Summer Olympics.
