= Fethi Missaoui =

Tunisian boxer (born 1974)

Personal information
- Born: January 8, 1974 (age 52)
Medal record
Men's Boxing
Representing Tunisia
Olympic Games
Bronze medal – third place	1996 Atlanta	Light Welterweight

Fethi Missaoui (Arabic: فتحي الميساوي; born January 8, 1974) is a Tunisian boxer. Missaoui won the light welterweight bronze medal at the 1996 Summer Olympics.

== Olympic results ==
- Defeated Lee Trautsch (Australia) 25–9
- Defeated Francie Barrett (Ireland) 18–6
- Defeated Mohamed Alalou (Algeria) 16–15
- Lost to Oktay Urkal (Germany) 6–20

== Pro career ==
Missaoui turned pro in 1998 and his career ended abruptly due to an eye injury in 2001. He retired undefeated (12–0–0).
