= Ben Neequaye =

Ghanaian boxer

Personal information
- Nationality: Ghanaian
- Born: 20 August 1980
- Died: 2006 (aged 25–26)

Sport
- Sport: Boxing

Ben Neequaye (22 August 1980 – 2006) was a Ghanaian boxer. He competed in the men's light welterweight event at the 2000 Summer Olympics.

As a professional he won the West African Boxing Union (WABU) lightweight title.
