= Lee Trautsch =

Australian boxer

Personal information
- Full name: Lee Gary Trautsch
- Nationality: Australian
- Born: 28 January 1971 (age 55) Sydney
- Height: 1.77 m (5 ft 9 1/2 in)
- Weight: 65 kg (143 lb)

Sport
- Sport: Boxing
- Weight class: Light Welterweight
- Club: Newton PCYC

Lee Gary Trautsch (born 28 January 1971 in Sydney) is a retired male boxer from Australia. He represented his native country at the 1996 Summer Olympics in Atlanta, Georgia, where he was stopped in the first round of the men's light welterweight division (– 63.5 kg) by Tunisia's Fethi Missaoui.

He has since retired in south west Sydney with his partner. He now runs a private farm.
