= Francie Barrett =

Irish boxer

Personal information
- Nickname: Southpaw
- Nationality: Irish
- Born: Francis Barrett; 7 February 1977 (age 49) Galway, Ireland
- Weight: light middleweight

Boxing career
- Stance: Southpaw

Boxing record
- Total fights: 20
- Wins: 17
- Losses: 3
- Draws: 0
- No contests: 0

Francis Barrett (born 7 February 1977) is a retired Irish professional boxer, who represented Ireland at the 1996 Summer Olympics in Atlanta, Georgia.

== Background ==
He was introduced to boxing by trainer, mentor and former boxer Chick Gillen.

== Amateur career ==
Barrett had in excess of 250 bouts as an amateur fighter and represented Ireland internationally. He won Irish titles at both junior and senior level and also won the British welterweight title in 1997, beating Tony Sesay and Michael Jennings on his way to winning the title.

The highlight of Barrett's career came when he was the youngest member of the Irish team at the 1996 Olympic Games and carried the Irish flag during the opening ceremony. During the Olympics, Barrett competed in the light welterweight division.

For this, he gained global media attention and became a national hero.

His results were:

- Defeated Zely Fereria Dos Santos (Brazil) 32–7
- Lost to Fethi Missaoui (Tunisia) 6–18

== Professional career ==
Barrett turned professional in August 2000 and fought at light welterweight, out of Wembley, London. Barrett won the British Southern Area Title and in June 2004 won the European (EU) Title.

== Outside the ring ==
In August 1998, Barrett and his father were stabbed during an altercation with members of the McDonagh traveller family in a pub car park in Castlegar, County Galway. The McDonaghs had been trying to arrange Barrett to contest one of their own family in bare-knuckle prize fight, however when he refused a fight broke out which resulted in the Barrett's suffering superficial slash wounds.

In March 1999, Barrett was ejected from a Galway nightclub due to his Irish Traveller heritage. At an earlier date, Barrett and his wife, Kathleen, were denied entry to a Salthill nightclub called Liquid. Barrett filed a lawsuit for the ejection.

The documentary, Southpaw: The Francis Barrett Story, won the Audience Prize at the 1999 New York Irish Film Festival. It followed Barrett for three years and showed him overcoming discrimination as he progressed up the amateur boxing ranks to eventually carry the Irish flag and box for Ireland at the age of 19 during the 1996 Olympics in Atlanta.

| Preceded by [[.]] | EBU-EU (European Union) light welterweight title light welterweight title ~ Champion; 2 July 2004 – 12 December 2004 | Succeeded by vacated |

Current Galway United player Franceley Lomboto was named after him. United fans are known to sing "All hail the Prince of hillside" when Lomboto scores.
