= Henry Collins (boxer) =

Australian boxer

Henry Collins (born 1 September 1977 in Gayndah, Queensland) is a former indigenous light welterweight boxer from Australia, who represented his native country at the 2000 Summer Olympics. Winning the Arthur Tunstall Trophy at the 1999 Australian National Championships is considered to be his best performance during his amateur career, in which he also claimed two Oceania Championships (1999 and 2000) in the 65 kg division.

He was an Australian Institute of Sport scholarship holder.
