= Sergey Bykovsky =

Belarusian boxer (born 1972)

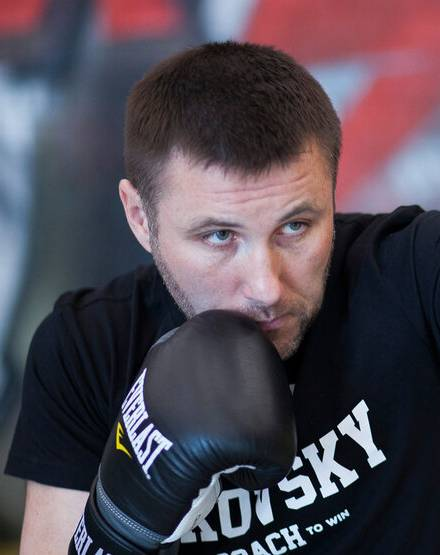

Personal information
- Native name: Серге́й Быковский
- Born: May 30, 1972 (age 54) Vitebsk, Byelorussian SSR, Soviet Union
Medal record
Men's Boxing
Representing Belarus
European Amateur Championships
Bronze medal – third place	1996 Vejle	Light Welterweight
Bronze medal – third place	1998 Minsk	Light Welterweight

Sergey Bykovsky (Russian: Серге́й Быковский; born May 30, 1972) is a boxer from Belarus, who won the bronze medal in the Men's Light Welterweight (– 63.5 kg) division at the 1996 European Amateur Boxing Championships in Vejle, Denmark, alongside Bulgaria's Radoslav Suslekov.

Bykovsky represented his native country at two consecutive Summer Olympics, starting in 1996 in Atlanta, United States. There he was stopped in the second round of the Men's Light-Welterweight division by France's Nordine Mouichi. He failed to qualify for the 2004 Summer Olympics, finishing in third place at the 3rd AIBA European 2004 Olympic Qualifying Tournament in Gothenburg, Sweden.
