= Aleksandr Leonov =

Russian boxer

Personal information
- Born: July 17, 1978 (age 47) Moscow, Russia
Medal record
Men's Boxing
Representing Russia
European Amateur Championships
Gold medal – first place	2000 Tampere	Light Welterweight

Aleksandr Petrovich Leonov (Russian: Александр Петрович Леонов; born July 17, 1978) is a boxer from Russia, who competed for his native country at the 2000 Summer Olympics in Sydney, Australia.

== Biography ==
He was born January 23, 1957 in Yakutsk.

In 1980 he graduated from Yakutsk State University, historical department.

In the same year, he won the Universiade of the RSFSR of Central Asia and Kazakhstan.

Leonov is best known for winning the gold medal at 2000 European Amateur Boxing Championships in the Men's Light-Welterweight (– 63.5 kg) division. In the final he defeated Bulgaria's Dimitar Stilianov.

== Coaching activities ==
Students:

- Sergey Samoylov (Master of Sports of the USSR of international class, the champion of the USSR; 1980-1992)
- Ivan Kurayev (Master of Sports of the USSR)
- Leonid Tiunov (Master of Sports of the USSR)
- Georgy Tatarinov (Master of Sports of the USSR
- Andrey Osipov (Master of Sports of the USSR)
- Alexander Okoneshnikov (Master of Sports of the USSR)

He participated in the training of the Honored Master of Sports of Russia Georgy Balakshin, international masters of sports Bato Vankeev, Afanasy Poskachin, Dmitry Fedorov, Innokenty Makarov, masters of sports Renat Khabibulin, Viktor Prushenov, Maxim Vasiliev, Vladimir Budaev, Peter Fokin, Dmitry Maksimov, Nikolai Dmitriev, Andrei Trofimov, Gavril Savinov, Daniil Solzhigasov, Andrey Sleptsov and more than 20 Russian sports masters who studied at the college Olympic Reserve.

== Awards and honours ==
- Honored Coach of the Yakut ASSR
- Honored Coach of the Sakha Republic
- Medal of Civil Valour
- Badge "For Loyalty"
- Commendation of the Minister of Internal Affairs of the Russian Federation

== Personal life ==
Aleksandr Leonov has two daughters.
