= Nordine Mouchi =

French boxer (born 1972)

Personal information
- Nationality: French
- Born: 3 June 1972 (age 54) Dombasle-sur-Meurthe, France

Sport
- Sport: Boxing
Medal record
Men's amateur boxing
Representing France
Goodwill Games
| Bronze medal – third place | 1994 Saint Petersburg | Light Welterweight |

Nordine Mouchi (born 3 June 1972) is a French boxer. He competed in the men's light welterweight event at the 1996 Summer Olympics.
