= Héctor Vinent =

Cuban boxer

Personal information
- Full name: Héctor Vinent Cháron
- Nationality: Cuba
- Born: July 25, 1972 (age 54) Santiago de Cuba
- Height: 1.70 m (5 ft 7 in)
- Weight: 64 kg (141 lb)

Sport
- Sport: Boxing
- Weight class: Light Welterweight
Medal record
Men's Boxing
Representing Cuba
Olympic Games
Gold medal – first place	1992 Barcelona	Light Welterweight
Gold medal – first place	1996 Atlanta	Light Welterweight
World Amateur Championships
Gold medal – first place	1993 Tampere	Light Welterweight
Gold medal – first place	1995 Berlin	Light Welterweight
Pan American Games
Bronze medal – third place	1995 Mar del Plata	Light Welterweight
Central American and Caribbean Games
Gold medal – first place	1993 Ponce	Light Welterweight
Goodwill Games
Gold medal – first place	1994 Saint Petersburg	Light Welterweight

Héctor Vinent Cháron (born July 25, 1972, in Santiago de Cuba) was a Cuban amateur boxer, who won the Light Welterweight Gold medal at the 1992 Summer Olympics and 1996 Summer Olympics. Hector appears in Brin-Jonathan Butler's forthcoming documentary Split Decision. He currently trains athletes at the Istanbul-based gym Mugenhous in Turkey.

== Accomplishments ==
- World Junior Champion (Lima 1990)
- Cuban National Champion (1992)
- Olympic Gold Medalist (Barcelona 1992)
- Cuban National Champion (1993)
- World Champion (Tampere 1993)
- Cuban National Champion (1994)
- World Champion (Berlin 1995)
- Cuban National Champion (1995)
- Olympic Gold Medalist (Atlanta 1996)
- Cuban National Champion (1996)
- Cuban National Champion (1997)
- Cuban National Champion (1998)

Retired in 2000 after an operation for a detached retina

== Success ==
Hector Vinent holds notable victories over future professional World Champions Shane Mosley, Stevie Johnston, Fernando Vargas, David Diaz, Daniel Santos and Diosbelys Hurtado. Defeated fellow Olympic Gold Medalists Andreas Zulow, Oleg Saitov, Yermakhan Ibrayimov, Hocine Soltani and Diegenes Luna.

At the age of 19, Hector Vinent was chosen to compete in the 1992 Barcelona Olympics where he had gone on to win the Gold. It was his first adult championship, prior he had fought in the youth championships. At the age of 23 he went on to win another Gold medal the 1996 Olympics as well as retaining his medal 4 years before.

In 2012, RingTV posted an article on the 10 Top Olympic Fighters of all time. In the article, writer Lee Groves placed Cuba's Hector Vinent as number five and his section on Vinent featured the following line:

“Vinent, who equaled Kulej's feat of two consecutive golds at junior welterweight, certainly had the youth and talent to shoot for a third gold in Sydney—and maybe an unprecedented fourth in Athens—but for reasons unknown to this writer he didn't.”

== Olympic Results ==
1992 Light Welterweight Gold Medalist

- Defeated Edwin Cassiani (Colombia) 27–4
- Defeated Andreas Zulow (Germany) 14–2
- Defeated Oleg Nikolaev (Unified Team/Russia) 26–3
- Defeated Jyri Kjall (Finland) 13–3
- Defeated Mark Leduc (Canada) 11–1

1996 Light Welterewight Gold Medalist

- Defeated Hyung-Min Han (South Korea) RSC 2 (1:00)
- Defeated Nurhan Suleymanoglu (Turkey) 23–1
- Defeated Edward Zakharov (Russia) 17–15
- Defeated Bolat Niyazymbetov (Kazakhstan) 23–6
- Defeated Oktay Urkal (Germany) 20-13

== World Championship Results ==
1993 (as a Light Welterweight)

- Defeated Zeljko Rastovic (Croatia) RSC 3
- Defeated Nurhan Suleymanoglu (Turkey) RSC 2
- Defeated Nordine Mouchi (France) 19–2
- Defeated Oktay Urkal (Germany) 12–7
- Defeated Jyri Kjall (Finland) 7–1

1995 (as a Light Welterweight)

- Defeated Abdellah Benbiar (Morocco) KO 3
- Defeated Jacek Bielski (Poland) 6–1
- Defeated Sergey Bykovskiy (Belarus) 7–1
- Defeated Radoslav Suslekov (Bulgaria) RSC 2
- Defeated Nurhan Suleymanoglu (Turkey) 7-4

== Retirement ==
Hector was forced to retire at a young age to an injury to his left eye. He had been examined by the doctors and was unable to continue as he had retinal detachment damage and continuing would eventually make him blind for life. His aim was to break fellow Cubans Teofilo Stevenson and Felix Savon's record as 3 time Olympic Gold Medalists as he had won 2 at the age of 23 and was still in age to win 2 more. However, this could not be done due to retirement.

In 2015 he began training aspiring international fighters in conjunction with Xtreme Gap Year. Hector currently, trains youths, pro athletes and women at Mugenhous gym in Istanbul Turkey.
