= Babak Moghimi =

Iranian boxer (born 1978)

Personal information
- Born: 1 January 1978 (age 48)
- Height: 183 cm (6 ft 0 in)

Sport
- Country: Iran
- Sport: Boxing
Medal record
Asian Championships
Gold medal – first place	1997 Kuala Lumpur	63.5 kg
West Asian Games
Gold medal – first place	1997 Tehran	63.5 kg

Babak Moghimi (Persian: بابک مقیمی; born 1 January 1978) is an Iranian boxer. He competed at the 1996 summer Olympics and 2000 Summer Olympics in Sydney, in the welterweight.
