= Muhammad Abdullaev =

Uzbekistani boxer (born 1973)

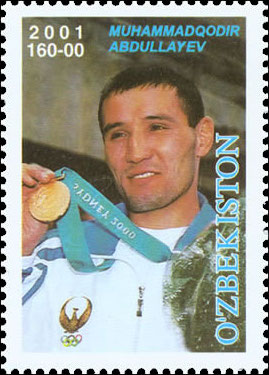
- Abdullaev on a 2001 stamp of Uzbekistan

Personal information
- Nationality: Uzbekistani
- Born: Muhammadqodir Mamatqulovich Abdullayev; 15 November 1973 (age 52) Andijan, Uzbek SSR, Soviet Union
- Height: 1.71 m (5 ft 7 in)
- Weight: Light-welterweight; Welterweight

Boxing career
- Reach: 169 cm (67 in)
- Stance: Orthodox

Boxing record
- Total fights: 25
- Wins: 21
- Win by KO: 14
- Losses: 4
Medal record
Amateur boxing
Representing Uzbekistan
Olympic Games
Gold medal – first place	2000 Sydney	-63.5 kg
World Championships
Gold medal – first place	1999 Houston	-63.5 kg
Asian Games
Gold medal – first place	1998 Bangkok	-63.5 kg
Asian Championships
Silver medal – second place	1995 Tashkent	-60 kg
Gold medal – first place	1997 Kuala Lumpur	-60 kg
Gold medal – first place	1999 Tashkent	-63.5 kg

Muhammadkadyr Mamatkulovich Abdullaev (Uzbek: Muhammadqodir Mamatqulovich Abdullayev; born 15 November 1973), best known as Muhammad Abdullaev, is an Uzbekistani former professional boxer who competed from 2001 to 2011, and challenged once for the WBO light-welterweight title in 2005. As an amateur he won gold medals in the light welterweight division at the 1999 World Championships and 2000 Olympics, where he served as the Olympic flag bearer for Uzbekistan.

== Olympic results ==
Represented Uzbekistan at the 1996 Atlanta Olympics (as a Lightweight)

Lost to Terrance Cauthen (United States) 6–18 Represented Uzbekistan at the 2000 Sydney Olympics (as a Light Welterweight) winning the gold medal.

Defeated Miguel Angel Cotto (Puerto Rico) 17–7 Defeated Kelson Pinto (Brazil) RSCO 4 Defeated Sergey Bykovskiy (Belarus) 9–6 Defeated Mohamed Allalou (Algeria) RSCO 2 Defeated Ricardo Williams Jr. (United States) 27–20 World Championships results 1993 World Championships participant in Tampere, Finland as a Featherweight. Lost to Enrique Carrion (Cuba) RSC 1 1997 World Championships participant in Budapest, Hungary as a Lightweight. Lost to Matt Zegan (Poland) 3–10 1999 World Championships Gold medallist in Houston, United States as a Light Welterweight. Defeated Aydin Gasanov (Russia) 10–6 Defeated Ricardo Williams Jr. (United States) 11–4 Defeated Sergey Bykovskiy (Belarus) 7–1 Defeated Lukas Konecny (Czech Republic) 12–2 Defeated Willy Blain (France) 11–6 Other Amateur Achievements Claimed amateur record: 288–12 1995 Asian Championships Silver medallist in Tashkent, Uzbekistan as a Lightweight. 1997 Asian Championships Gold medallist in Kuala Lumpur, Malaysia as a Lightweight. 1998 World Cup Gold medallist in Chongqing, China as a Light Welterweight. 1998 Asian Games Gold medallist in Bangkok, Thailand as a Light Welterweight. 1999 Asian Championships Gold medallist in Tashkent, Uzbekistan as a Light Welterweight.

== Professional career ==
Abdullaev turned professional in 2001 and had limited success. Although he won his first 11 bouts, including a victory over former IBF Lightweight Title holder Philip Holiday, he was KO'd in 2003 by Emmanuel Clottey, although he was winning the fight at the time, and it appeared that he was counted out only because he didn't understand the referee's count (which was in English). He has since lost to Miguel Cotto and Andreas Kotelnik.
