= 2011 World Judo Championships – Women's 52 kg =

Judo competition

Judo Women's 52 kg at the 2011 World Judo Championships
- Venue: Accor Arena
- Location: Paris, France
- Date: 24 August 2011
- Competitors: 55 from 41 nations

Medalists
gold medal	Misato Nakamura (2nd title)	Japan
silver medal	Yuka Nishida	Japan
bronze medal	Ana Carrascosa	Spain
bronze medal	Andreea Chițu	Romania

Competition at external databases
- Links: IJF • JudoInside

The women's 52 kg competition of the 2011 World Judo Championships was held on August 24.

== Medalists ==
Gold	Silver	Bronze
Misato Nakamura (JPN)	Yuka Nishida (JPN)	Ana Carrascosa (ESP); Andreea Chițu (ROU)

== Results ==
=== Pool A ===
First Round
(Japan) Yuka Nishida	100
(Turkmenistan) Jennet Geldibayeva	000
(Russia) Anna Kharitonova	001
(China) He Hongmei	000
(France) Pénélope Bonna	100
(Laos) Phonenaly Sayarath	000
(Portugal) Joana Ramos	001
(Germany) Romy Tarangul	000
(Czech Republic) Lucie Chytra	000
(Kosovo) Majlinda Kelmendi	100
(United States) Angelica Delgado	000
(Algeria) Meriem Moussa	100

Quarterfinals
(Japan) Yuka Nishida	100
(Luxembourg) Marie Müller	000
(Russia) Anna Kharitonova	000
(France) Pénélope Bonna	100
(Portugal) Joana Ramos	010
(Kosovo) Majlinda Kelmendi	000
(Algeria) Meriem Moussa	001
(India) Kalpana Devi Thoudam	000

Semifinals
(Japan) Yuka Nishida	110
(France) Pénélope Bonna	001
(Portugal) Joana Ramos	011
(Algeria) Meriem Moussa	000

Final
(Japan) Yuka Nishida	100
(Portugal) Joana Ramos	000

=== Pool B ===
First Round
(United Kingdom) Sophie Cox	101
(Macau) Vong Chi Ieng	000
(Poland) Marta Kuban	001
(Ukraine) Liudmyla Afendikova	000
(Ivory Coast) Zouleiha Abzetta Dabonne	000
(Mongolia) Solongo Baatarsaikhan	001
(North Korea) Jo Song Hui	010
(Morocco) Hanane Kerroumi	000
(Romania) Andreea Chițu	100
(Switzerland) Kathrin Frey	000

Quarterfinals
(Spain) Laura Gomez	100
(Colombia) Yulieth Sánchez	000
(United Kingdom) Sophie Cox	000
(Poland) Marta Kuban	100
(Brazil) Érika Miranda	001
(Mongolia) Solongo Baatarsaikhan	000
(North Korea) Jo Song Hui	011
(Romania) Andreea Chițu	100

Semifinals
(Spain) Laura Gomez	012
(Poland) Marta Kuban	010
(Brazil) Érika Miranda	000
(Romania) Andreea Chițu	100

Final
(Spain) Laura Gomez	000
(Romania) Andreea Chițu	100

=== Pool C ===
First Round
(Japan) Misato Nakamura	100
(Lebanon) Lea Farhat	000
(India) Rasheswori Chanu Oinam	000
(Kazakhstan) Kelbet Nurgazina	101
(North Korea) An Kum-ae	100
(Israel) Shahar Levy	000
(Russia) Natalia Kuzyutina	100
(Romania) Ramona Enache	000
(Italy) Rosalba Forciniti	000
(South Korea) Kim Kyung-Ok	001
(Haiti) Linouse Desravine	000
(Australia) Sonya Chervonsky	101

Quarterfinals
(Japan) Misato Nakamura	101
(Kazakhstan) Kelbet Nurgazina	000
(North Korea) An Kum-ae	110
(Turkey) Aynur Samat	001
(Russia) Natalia Kuzyutina	100
(Turkmenistan) Gulbadam Babamuratova	000
(South Korea) Kim Kyung-Ok	010
(Australia) Sonya Chervonsky	000

Semifinals
(Japan) Misato Nakamura	011
(North Korea) An Kum-ae	001
(Russia) Natalia Kuzyutina	100
(South Korea) Kim Kyung-Ok	000

Final
(Japan) Misato Nakamura	100
(Russia) Natalia Kuzyutina	000

=== Pool D ===
First Round
(Mongolia) Mönkhbaataryn Bundmaa	101
(Algeria) Soraya Haadad	001
(Cuba) Yanet Bermoy Acosta	002
(Finland) Jaana Sundberg	000
(France) Priscilla Gneto	101
(China) He Cancan	000
(Spain) Ana Carrascosa	100
(Uzbekistan) Rima Berdygulova	000
(Ukraine) Mariia Buiok	001
(Cameroon) Ngandeu Weyinjam	000
(Belgium) Ilse Heylen	111
(United States) Natalie Lafon	000

Quarterfinals
(Mongolia) Mönkhbaataryn Bundmaa	000
(Cuba) Yanet Bermoy Acosta	010
(France) Priscilla Gneto	100
(Dominican Republic) Maria Garcia	001
(Spain) Ana Carrascosa	001
(Ukraine) Mariia Buiok	000
(Belgium) Ilse Heylen	010
(Germany) Mareen Kräh	000

Semifinals
(Cuba) Yanet Bermoy Acosta	000
(France) Priscilla Gneto	000
(Spain) Ana Carrascosa	001
(Belgium) Ilse Heylen	000

Final
(France) Priscilla Gneto	000
(Spain) Ana Carrascosa	001

=== Repechage ===
Repechage		Third place
(Portugal) Joana Ramos	100
(Spain) Laura Gomez	000	(Portugal) Joana Ramos	001
		(Spain) Ana Carrascosa	100

Repechage		Third place
(Russia) Natalia Kuzyutina	000
(France) Priscilla Gneto	100	(France) Priscilla Gneto	000
		(Romania) Andreea Chițu	001

=== Finals ===
Semi-finals
(Japan) Yuka Nishida	100
(Romania) Andreea Chițu	000
(Japan) Misato Nakamura	100
(Spain) Ana Carrascosa	000

Final
(Japan) Yuka Nishida	000
(Japan) Misato Nakamura	001
