= Judo at the 2008 Summer Olympics – Women's 52 kg =

Women's 52 kg at the Games of the XXIX Olympiad
- Venue: Beijing Science and Technology University Gymnasium
- Dates: 10 August 2008
- Winning score: 0011

Medalists
1st place, gold medalist(s)		Xian Dongmei	China
2nd place, silver medalist(s)		An Kum-Ae	North Korea
3rd place, bronze medalist(s)		Soraya Haddad	Algeria
3rd place, bronze medalist(s)		Misato Nakamura	Japan

The Women's 52 kg (also known as half-lightweight) judo tournament at the 2008 Summer Olympics was held on August 10 at the Beijing Science and Technology University Gymnasium. A total of 22 women competed in this event, limited to jūdōka with a body weight of less than 52 kilograms. Preliminary rounds started at 12:00 CST, while repechage finals, semifinals, bouts for bronze medals and the final were held at 18:00 CST.

This event was the second-lightest of the women's judo weight classes, limiting competitors to a maximum of 52 kilograms of body mass. Like all other judo events, bouts lasted five minutes. If the bout was still tied at the end, it was extended for another five-minute, sudden-death period; if neither judoka scored during that period, the match is decided by the judges. The tournament bracket consisted of a single-elimination contest culminating in a gold medal match. There was also a repechage to determine the winners of the two bronze medals. Each judoka who had lost to a semifinalist competed in the repechage. The two judokas who lost in the semifinals faced the winner of the opposite half of the bracket's repechage in bronze medal bouts.

== Qualifying athletes ==
Mat	Athlete	Country
1	Flor Velázquez	Venezuela
1	An Kum-ae	North Korea
1	Yagnelis Mestre	Cuba
1	Shih Pei-chun	Chinese Taipei
1	Sholpan Kaliyeva	Kazakhstan
1	Ilse Heylen	Belgium
1	Audrey La Rizza	France
1	Kristie-Anne Ryder	Australia
1	Zinura Djuraeva	Uzbekistan
1	Romy Tarangul	Germany
1	Misato Nakamura	Japan
2	Anna Kharitonova	Russia
2	Telma Monteiro	Portugal
2	Ana Carrascosa	Spain
2	Mönkhbaataryn Bundmaa	Mongolia
2	Xian Dongmei	China
2	María García	Dominican Republic
2	Andressa Fernandes	Brazil
2	Kim Kyung-ok	South Korea
2	Hortense Diedhiou	Senegal
2	Marie Muller	Luxembourg
2	Soraya Haddad	Algeria

== Tournament results ==
=== Final ===
Final
1	An Kum-Ae (PRK)	0001
2	Xian Dongmei (CHN)	0011

=== Mat 1 ===
The gold and silver medalists were determined by the final match of the main single-elimination bracket.

1st round
An Kum-Ae (PRK)	0201
Yagnelis Mestre (CUB)	0000
Ilse Heylen (BEL)	0001
Audrey La Rizza (FRA)	0000
Zinura Djuraeva (UZB)	0000
Romy Tarangul (GER)	1101

Round of 16
Flor Velázquez (VEN)	0001
An Kum-Ae (PRK)	0010
Shih Pei-Chun (TPE)	0020
Sholpan Kaliyeva (KAZ)	0021
Ilse Heylen (BEL)	1000
Kristie-Anne Ryder (AUS)	0000
Romy Tarangul (GER)	0000
Misato Nakamura (JPN)	0001

Quarter Finals
An Kum-Ae (PRK)	0200
Sholpan Kaliyeva (KAZ)	0000
Ilse Heylen (BEL)	0000
Misato Nakamura (JPN)	0001

Semi Finals
An Kum-Ae (PRK)	0001
Misato Nakamura (JPN)	0000

=== Mat 2 ===
The gold and silver medalists were determined by the final match of the main single-elimination bracket.

1st round
Ana Carrascosa (ESP)	0100
Mönkhbaataryn Bundmaa (MGL)	0000
María García (DOM)	0010
Andressa Fernandes (BRA)	0001
Marie Muller (LUX)	0000
Soraya Haddad (ALG)	0211

Round of 16
Anna Kharitonova (RUS)	0000
Telma Monteiro (POR)	0211
Ana Carrascosa (ESP)	0000
Xian Dongmei (CHN)	1000
María García (DOM)	0000
Kim Kyung-Ok (KOR)	1003
Hortense Diedhiou (SEN)	0001
Soraya Haddad (ALG)	0010

Quarter Finals
Telma Monteiro (POR)	0010
Xian Dongmei (CHN)	1011
Kim Kyung-Ok (KOR)	0001
Soraya Haddad (ALG)	0210

Semi Finals
Xian Dongmei (CHN)	1001
Soraya Haddad (ALG)	0000

=== Repechage ===
Those judoka eliminated in earlier rounds by the four semifinalists of the main bracket advanced to the repechage. These matches determined the two bronze medalists for the event.

First round
Yagnelis Mestre (CUB)	0000
Flor Velázquez (VEN)	0001
Romy Tarangul (GER)
Bye
Ana Carrascosa (ESP)
bye
Marie Muller (LUX)	1001
Hortense Diedhiou (SEN)	0001

Second round
Sholpan Kaliyeva (KAZ)	0010
Flor Velázquez (VEN)	0000
Ilse Heylen (BEL)	0002
Romy Tarangul (GER)	0000
Telma Monteiro (POR)	0001
Ana Carrascosa (ESP)	0101
Kim Kyung-Ok (KOR)	0010
Marie Muller (LUX)	0001

Third round
Sholpan Kaliyeva (KAZ)	1000
Ilse Heylen (BEL)	0000
Ana Carrascosa (ESP)	0001
Kim Kyung-Ok (KOR)	1010

Bronze medal finals
Soraya Haddad (ALG)	0121
Sholpan Kaliyeva (KAZ)	0010
Misato Nakamura (JPN)	0200
Kim Kyung-Ok (KOR)	0000
