= Judo at the 2006 Asian Games – Women's 52 kg =

Judo competition

Women's 52 kg at the 2006 Asian Games
- Venue: Qatar SC Indoor Hall
- Date: 4 December 2006
- Competitors: 10 from 10 nations

Medalists
gold medal	An Kum-ae	North Korea
silver medal	Mönkhbaataryn Bundmaa	Mongolia
bronze medal	Li Ying	China
bronze medal	Yuki Yokosawa	Japan

The women's 52 kilograms (half lightweight) competition at the 2006 Asian Games in Doha was held on 4 December at the Qatar SC Indoor Hall.

== Schedule ==
All times are Arabia Standard Time (UTC+03:00)

Date	Time	Event
Monday, 4 December 2006	14:00	Round of 16
Monday, 4 December 2006	14:00	Quarterfinals
Monday, 4 December 2006	14:00	Repechage final
Monday, 4 December 2006	14:00	Semifinals
Monday, 4 December 2006	14:00	Finals

== Results ==
Legend

- WO — Won by walkover

=== Main bracket ===
Round of 16
Li Ying (CHN)	1011
Ranju Rai (NEP)	0000
Đỗ Khánh Vân (VIE)	0000
Angom Anita Chanu (IND)	0001

Quarterfinals
Yuki Yokosawa (JPN)	1001
Boossara Sreetanaratn (THA)	0000
An Kum-ae (PRK)	0200
Li Ying (CHN)	0010
Mönkhbaataryn Bundmaa (MGL)	0001
Sholpan Kaliyeva (KAZ)	0000
Angom Anita Chanu (IND)	0001
Kim Kyung-ok (KOR)	0011

Semifinals
Yuki Yokosawa (JPN)	0000
An Kum-ae (PRK)	0010
Mönkhbaataryn Bundmaa (MGL)	0001
Kim Kyung-ok (KOR)	0000

Gold medal contest
An Kum-ae (PRK)	1000
Mönkhbaataryn Bundmaa (MGL)	0000

=== Repechage ===
Repechage final
Boossara Sreetanaratn (THA)	0000
Li Ying (CHN)	1000
Sholpan Kaliyeva (KAZ)	0011
Angom Anita Chanu (IND)	0100

Bronze medal contest
Li Ying (CHN)	WO
Kim Kyung-ok (KOR)
Angom Anita Chanu (IND)	0000
Yuki Yokosawa (JPN)	1002
