= Judo at the 2010 Asian Games – Women's 52 kg =

Judo competition

Women's 52 kg at the 2010 Asian Games
- Venue: Huagong Gymnasium
- Date: 15 November 2010
- Competitors: 15 from 15 nations

Medalists
gold medal	Misato Nakamura	Japan
silver medal	Mönkhbaataryn Bundmaa	Mongolia
bronze medal	He Hongmei	China
bronze medal	An Kum-ae	North Korea

The women's 52 kilograms (half lightweight) competition at the 2010 Asian Games in Guangzhou was held on 15 November at the Huagong Gymnasium.

Misato Nakamura of Japan won the gold medal.

== Schedule ==
All times are China Standard Time (UTC+08:00)

Date	Time	Event
Monday, 15 November 2010	10:00	Preliminary
Monday, 15 November 2010	10:00	Quarterfinals
Monday, 15 November 2010	15:00	Final of repechage
Monday, 15 November 2010	15:00	Final of table
Monday, 15 November 2010	15:00	Finals

== Results ==
=== Main bracket ===
Preliminary
Kalpana Devi Thoudam (IND)	011
Sureerat Sadmaroeng (THA)	100
Kim Kyung-ok (KOR)	100
Un Si Man (MAC)	000
An Kum-ae (PRK)	020
Gülbadam Babamuratowa (TKM)	000
He Hongmei (CHN)	111
Sushila Adhikari (NEP)	000
Rima Berdygulova (UZB)	100
Dương Thị Thanh Minh (VIE)	001
Mönkhbaataryn Bundmaa (MGL)	101
Noushin Taghiloo (IRI)	000
Sholpan Kaliyeva (KAZ)	100
Phonenaly Sayarath (LAO)	000

Quarterfinals
Misato Nakamura (JPN)	020
Sureerat Sadmaroeng (THA)	000
Kim Kyung-ok (KOR)	000
An Kum-ae (PRK)	101
He Hongmei (CHN)	021
Rima Berdygulova (UZB)	000
Mönkhbaataryn Bundmaa (MGL)	003
Sholpan Kaliyeva (KAZ)	000

Final of table
Misato Nakamura (JPN)	010
An Kum-ae (PRK)	010
He Hongmei (CHN)	001
Mönkhbaataryn Bundmaa (MGL)	100

Gold medal
Misato Nakamura (JPN)	012
Mönkhbaataryn Bundmaa (MGL)	000

=== Repechage ===
Final of repechage
Sureerat Sadmaroeng (THA)	000
Kim Kyung-ok (KOR)	100
Rima Berdygulova (UZB)	002
Sholpan Kaliyeva (KAZ)	000

Bronze medals
Kim Kyung-ok (KOR)	000
He Hongmei (CHN)	011
Rima Berdygulova (UZB)	000
An Kum-ae (PRK)	101
