= Yagnelis Mestre =

Cuban judoka (born 1983)

Personal information
- Nationality: Cuba
- Born: 24 October 1983 (age 42) Havana, Cuba
- Height: 1.60 m (5 ft 3 in)
- Weight: 52 kg (115 lb)

Sport
- Sport: Judo
- Event: 52 kg
Medal record
Women's judo
Representing Cuba
Pan American Games
Bronze medal – third place	2007 Rio de Janeiro	57 kg
Pan American Championships
Bronze medal – third place	2007 Montreal	57 kg

Yagnelis Mestre (born October 24, 1983, in Havana) is a Cuban judoka, who played for the half-middleweight category. She won a bronze medal for the 57 kg class at the 2007 Pan American Games in Rio de Janeiro, Brazil.

Mestre represented Cuba at the 2008 Summer Olympics in Beijing, where she competed for the women's half-lightweight class (52 kg). She lost the first preliminary match to North Korea's An Kum-Ae, who scored a waza-ari-awasete-ippon before the start of the second minute. Because her opponent advanced further into the final match against China's Xian Dongmei, Mestre offered another shot for a bronze medal through the repechage, where she was defeated by Venezuela's Flor Velázquez, who only scored a single koka within a five-minute period.
