= Ana Carrascosa =

Spanish judoka

Personal information
- Full name: Ana Carrascosa Zaragoza
- Born: 6 May 1980 (age 46) Valencia, Spain
- Occupation: Judoka
- Height: 1.58 m (5 ft 2 in)

Sport
- Country: Spain
- Sport: Judo
- Weight class: ‍–‍52 kg
- Club: Club Judokan, Valencia, ESP

Achievements and titles
- Olympic Games: 7th (2008)
- World Champ.: (bronze) (2009, 2011)
- European Champ.: (gold) (2008)
Medal record
Women's judo
Representing Spain
World Championships
Bronze medal – third place	2009 Rotterdam	‍–‍52 kg
Bronze medal – third place	2011 Paris	‍–‍52 kg
European Championships
Gold medal – first place	2008 Lisbon	‍–‍52 kg
Silver medal – second place	2002 Maribor	‍–‍52 kg
Silver medal – second place	2009 Tbilisi	‍–‍52 kg
Bronze medal – third place	2011 Istanbul	‍–‍52 kg
IJF Grand Slam
Silver medal – second place	2010 Paris	‍–‍52 kg
Bronze medal – third place	2009 Tokyo	‍–‍52 kg
Bronze medal – third place	2011 Paris	‍–‍52 kg
Bronze medal – third place	2012 Paris	‍–‍52 kg
IJF Grand Prix
Silver medal – second place	2009 Qingdao	‍–‍52 kg
Silver medal – second place	2010 Tunis	‍–‍52 kg
Bronze medal – third place	2010 Rotterdam	‍–‍52 kg
Bronze medal – third place	2010 Abu Dhabi	‍–‍52 kg
Bronze medal – third place	2011 Düsseldorf	‍–‍52 kg
World Juniors Championships
Bronze medal – third place	1998 Cali	‍–‍52 kg
European Junior Championships
Bronze medal – third place	1998 Bucharest	‍–‍52 kg
Bronze medal – third place	1999 Rome	‍–‍52 kg
Mediterranean Games
Bronze medal – third place	2009 Pescara	‍–‍52 kg

Profile at external databases
- IJF: 29578
- JudoInside.com: 618
- Updated on 17 July 2023

Ana Carrascosa Zaragoza (Note: In this Spanish name, the first or paternal surname is Carrascosa and the second or maternal family name is Zaragoza.) (born 6 May 1980) is a Spanish judoka who competes in the women's 52 kg category. Carrascosa has twice been a bronze medalist at the World Judo Championships (2009, 2011). At European level, Carrascosa has won the European Championships once (2008), came second twice (2002 and 2009) and won one bronze medal (2011). At the 2008 Summer Olympics, Carrascosa reached the third round where she lost to the eventual champion Xian Dongmei. She then lost to Kim Kyung-ok in the bronze medal match in the repechage. At the 2012 Summer Olympics, she was defeated in the first round by Marie Muller of Luxembourg.

== Personal life ==
She was born in Valencia, Spain. She attended the Sagrado Corazón HH. Maristas de Valencia and Mas Camarena where she began her playing career. She speaks French and Spanish.
