= Marie Muller (judoka) =

Luxembourgish judoka

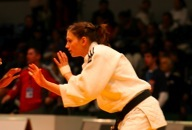

Personal information
- Born: 29 July 1985 (age 41) Filderstadt, Germany
- Occupation: Judoka
- Height: 1.63 m (5 ft 4 in)

Sport
- Country: Luxembourg
- Sport: Judo
- Weight class: ‍–‍52 kg

Achievements and titles
- Olympic Games: 5th (2012)
- World Champ.: 7th (2013)
- European Champ.: 7th (2011)
Medal record
Women's judo
Representing Luxembourg
IJF Grand Slam
Silver medal – second place	2010 Rio de Janeiro	‍–‍52 kg
European U23 Championships
Bronze medal – third place	2004 Ljubljana	‍–‍48 kg
Games of the Small States of Europe
Gold medal – first place	2011 Liechtenstein	‍–‍52 kg
Gold medal – first place	2011 Liechtenstein	Women's team
Gold medal – first place	2013 Luxembourg	‍–‍52 kg
Gold medal – first place	2013 Luxembourg	Women's team
Gold medal – first place	2015 Iceland	‍–‍52 kg

Profile at external databases
- IJF: 2
- JudoInside.com: 25722
- Updated on 28 November 2022

Marie Muller (born 29 July 1985 in Filderstadt) is a Luxembourgish judoka.

== Biography ==
Marie Muller's first official competition was the EM U23 tournament in Ljubljana 2004, where she finished in third place. Since that competition Marie has participated in about 20 tournaments including the Beijing Olympic Games and the London Olympic Games in 2012. Her best achievement besides participating in the Olympics was first place in the Swedish open in 2007 and first place in the 2008 A-World Cup (Birmingham). Muller has also earned the title of best Luxembourgish athlete of the year three times in 2008, 2010 and 2012.

== Main results ==
2012 - Summer Olympics London (-52 kg) - 5th place

2008 – A-World Cup in Birmingham
2008 – Summer Olympics Beijing (−52 kg) – 9th place
2008 – 2008 World cup in Moscow – 5th place
2007 – Monaco games – 1st place
2007 – Sweden Open – 1st place
2006 – DHM Braunschweig – 1st place

== 2008 Summer Olympics – Beijing ==
At the 2008 Summer Olympics, Muller's first bout was against one of the eventual bronze medal winners, Soraya Haddad of Algeria in which she lost 0001–0211. She did, however, advance to the repechage rounds. Her first repechage bout was against Hortance Diedhiou of Senegal and she won 1001–0001. In her second repechage bout, she lost to Kim Kyung-Ok of South Korea. She didn't advance to the later repechage rounds.

== 2012 Summer Olympics – London ==
At the 2012 Summer Olympics, Muller first beat Ana Carrascosa of Spain and then beat María García of the Dominican Republic. In the quarter-finals however, she lost to silver medalist Yanet Bermoy from Cuba but qualified for the repechage rounds. In the repechage rounds, she first beat Mauritius' Christianne Legentil and moved on to the bronze medal bout against Italy's Rosalba Forciniti. The bout finished with Forciniti crowned the joint bronze medalist along with Priscilla Gneto from France.
