= Judo at the 2012 Summer Olympics – Women's 52 kg =

Women's 52kg at the Games of the XXX Olympiad
- Venue: ExCeL Exhibition Centre
- Date: 29 July 2012
- Competitors: 23 from 23 nations

Medalists
1st place, gold medalist(s)		An Kum-ae	North Korea
2nd place, silver medalist(s)		Yanet Bermoy	Cuba
3rd place, bronze medalist(s)		Priscilla Gneto	France
3rd place, bronze medalist(s)		Rosalba Forciniti	Italy

Women's 52 kg competition in judo at the 2012 Summer Olympics in London, United Kingdom, took place at ExCeL London.

The gold and silver medals were determined by a single-elimination tournament, with the winner of the final taking gold and the loser receiving silver. Judo events awarded two bronze medals. Quarterfinal losers competed in a repechage match for the right to face a semifinal loser for a bronze medal (that is, the judokas defeated in quarterfinals A and B competed against each other, with the winner of that match facing the semifinal loser from the other half of the bracket).

== Schedule ==
All times are British Summer Time (UTC+1)

Date	Time	Round
Sunday, 29 July 2012	09:30; 14:00; 16:10	Qualifications; Semifinals; Final

== Results ==
=== Finals ===
Semi-finals
Yanet Bermoy (CUB)	0110
Ilse Heylen (BEL)	0002
An Kum-ae (PRK)	1010
Rosalba Forciniti (ITA)	0000

Final
Yanet Bermoy (CUB)	0000
An Kum-ae (PRK)	0010

=== Repechages ===
Repechage		Bronze medal
Marie Müller (LUX)	1010
Christianne Legentil (MRI)	0002	Marie Müller (LUX)	0001
		Rosalba Forciniti (ITA)	0000

Repechage		Bronze medal
Priscilla Gneto (FRA)	0021
Kim Kyung-Ok (KOR)	0002	Priscilla Gneto (FRA)	1012
		Ilse Heylen (BEL)	0012

=== Pool A ===
First Round
M Bundmaa (MGL)	0100
L Desravine (HAI)	0000
A Carrascosa (ESP)	0000
M Müller (LUX)	0201

Second Round
M Bundmaa (MGL)	0000
Y Bermoy (CUB)	0020
M Müller (LUX)	1011
M Garcia (DOM)	0002

Quarterfinals
Y Bermoy (CUB)	0011
M Müller (LUX)	0002

=== Pool B ===
First Round
S Haddad (ALG)	0000
A Chițu (ROU)	0100
M Kelmendi (ALB)	0110
J Sundberg (FIN)	0001

Second Round
A Chițu (ROU)	0000
I Heylen (BEL)	0010
M Kelmendi (ALB)	0101
C Legentil (MRI)	1001

Quarterfinals
I Heylen (BEL)	0020
C Legentil (MRI)	0002

=== Pool C ===
First Round		Second Round		Quarterfinals
		M Nakamura (JPN)	0002
K-A An (PRK)	0001	K-A An (PRK)	0102
S Cox (GBR)	0000			K-A An (PRK)	0102
P Gneto (FRA)	0111			P Gneto (FRA)	0013
H He (CHN)	0012	P Gneto (FRA)	1001
		J Ramos (POR)	0000

=== Pool D ===
First Round		Second Round		Quarterfinals
		E Miranda (BRA)	0001
		K-O Kim (KOR)	1012
				K-O Kim (KOR)	0001
N Kuziutina (RUS)	0000			R Forciniti (ITA)	0001
R Tarangul (GER)	0001	R Tarangul (GER)	0002
		R Forciniti (ITA)	0010
