= Andressa Fernandes =

Brazilian Olympic judoka (born 1986)

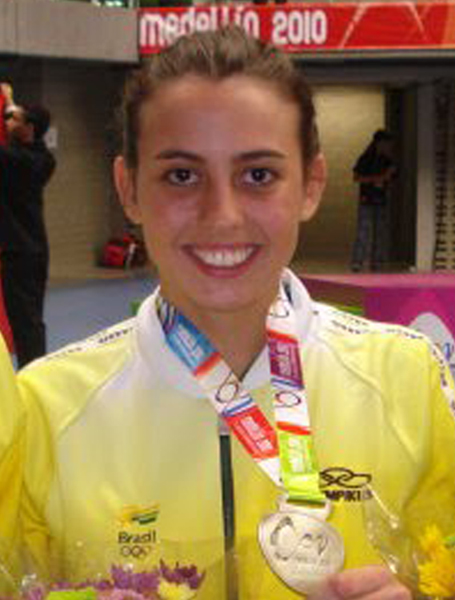

Personal information
- Full name: Andressa Fernandes Corrêa
- Nationality: Brazil
- Born: 27 October 1986 (age 39) Santos, São Paulo, Brazil
- Height: 1.57 m (5 ft 2 in)
- Weight: 52 kg (115 lb)

Sport
- Sport: Judo
- Event: 52 kg
Medal record
Women's judo
Representing Brazil
South American Games
Gold medal – first place	2010 Medellín	52 kg
Silver medal – second place	2002 Buenos Aires	48 kg
Silver medal – second place	2006 Rio de Janeiro	52 kg

Andressa Fernandes Corrêa (born 27 October 1986) is a Brazilian judoka, who played for the half-lightweight category. She won three medals (one gold and two silver) for the extra- and half-lightweight categories at the South American Games.

Fernandes represented Brazil at the 2008 Summer Olympics in Beijing, where she competed for the women's 52 kg class. She received a last-minute place for the national team as a replacement for Érika Miranda, who immediately withdrew from the games because of a knee injury. With a short time of training and full preparation, Fernandes, however, lost the first preliminary match against Dominican Republic's María García, who was able to score a yuko within the five-minute period.
