= Zinura Djuraeva =

Uzbekistan Olympic judoka

Personal information
- Nationality: Uzbekistan
- Born: 26 September 1985 (age 40)
- Height: 1.58 m (5 ft 2 in)
- Weight: 52 kg (115 lb)

Sport
- Sport: Judo
- Event: 52 kg
Medal record
Women's judo
Representing Uzbekistan
Asian Championships
Bronze medal – third place	2003 Jeju City	52 kg

Zinura Djuraeva (Uzbek: Зиннура Джураева; born September 26, 1985) is an Uzbekistani judoka, who played for the extra and half lightweight categories. She won the bronze medal for the 48 kg class at the 2003 Asian Judo Championships in Jeju City, South Korea.

Djuraeva represented Uzbekistan at the 2008 Summer Olympics in Beijing, where she competed for the women's half-lightweight class (52 kg). She lost the first preliminary match to Germany's Romy Tarangul, who successfully scored an ippon and a hadaka-jime (naked strangle), twelve seconds before the five-minute period had ended.
