= Sholpan Kaliyeva =

Kazakhstani Olympic judoka (born 1980)

Personal information
- Full name: Sholpan Seydullayevna Kaliyeva
- Nationality: Kazakhstan
- Born: 5 July 1980 (age 45) Alma-Ata, Kazakh SSR, Soviet Union
- Occupation: Judoka
- Height: 1.57 m (5 ft 2 in)
- Weight: 52 kg (115 lb)

Sport
- Sport: Judo
- Event: 52 kg
Medal record
Women's judo
Representing Kazakhstan
Asian Games
| Bronze medal – third place | 2002 Busan | 52 kg |
Asian Championships
| Bronze medal – third place | 2001 Ulaanbaatar | 52 kg |
| Bronze medal – third place | 2008 Jeju City | 52 kg |

Profile at external databases
- JudoInside.com: 8573

Sholpan Seydullayevna Kaliyeva (Kazakh: Шолпан Сейдуллаевна Калиева, Şolpan Seidullaevna Kalieva; born July 5, 1980, in Almaty) is a Kazakhstani judoka, who played for the half-lightweight category. She is also a two-time Olympian, and a bronze medalist for her division at the 2002 Asian Games in Busan, South Korea.

Kaliyeva made her official debut for the 2004 Summer Olympics in Athens, where she lost the first preliminary match of women's half-lightweight class (52 kg), with an ippon and a tai otoshi (body drop), to Belgium's Ilse Heylen, who eventually won the bronze medal in this event.

At the 2008 Summer Olympics in Beijing, Kaliyeva competed for the second time in women's 52 kg class. She defeated Chinese Taipei's Shih Pei-Chun in the preliminary rounds, before losing out the quarterfinal match, with a waza-ari awasete ippon and an uchi mata gaeshi (inner thigh counter), to North Korea's An Kum-Ae. Because her opponent advanced further into the final, Kaliyeva offered another shot for the bronze medal by defeating Venezuela's Flor Velázquez and Belgium's Ilse Heylen (who ousted her from the previous Olympics) in the repechage rounds. She finished in fifth place, after losing out the bronze medal match to Algeria's Soraya Haddad, who successfully scored a waza-ari (half-point) and a kibisu gaeshi (one-hand reversal), at the end of the five-minute period.
