= Costel Danculea =

Romanian judoka

Personal information
- Born: 3 March 1985 (age 41)
- Occupation: Judoka

Sport
- Country: Romania
- Sport: Judo
- Weight class: –66 kg, –73 kg

Achievements and titles
- World Champ.: R16 (2009)
- European Champ.: 5th (2006)
Medal record
Men's judo
Representing Romania
IJF Grand Slam
Bronze medal – third place	2011 Rio de Janeiro	–73 kg
World Juniors Championships
Bronze medal – third place	2004 Budapest	–66 kg
European Junior Championships
Silver medal – second place	2004 Sofia	–66 kg
Bronze medal – third place	2003 Sarajevo	–66 kg

Profile at external databases
- IJF: 375
- JudoInside.com: 16388
- Updated on 27 November 2022

Costel Danculea (born 3 March 1985) is a Romanian judoka.

== Achievements ==
Year	Tournament	Place	Weight class
2006	European Judo Championships	5th	Half lightweight (66 kg)
2005	European Judo Championships	7th	Half lightweight (66 kg)
