= Anna Kharitonova =

Russian Olympic judoka

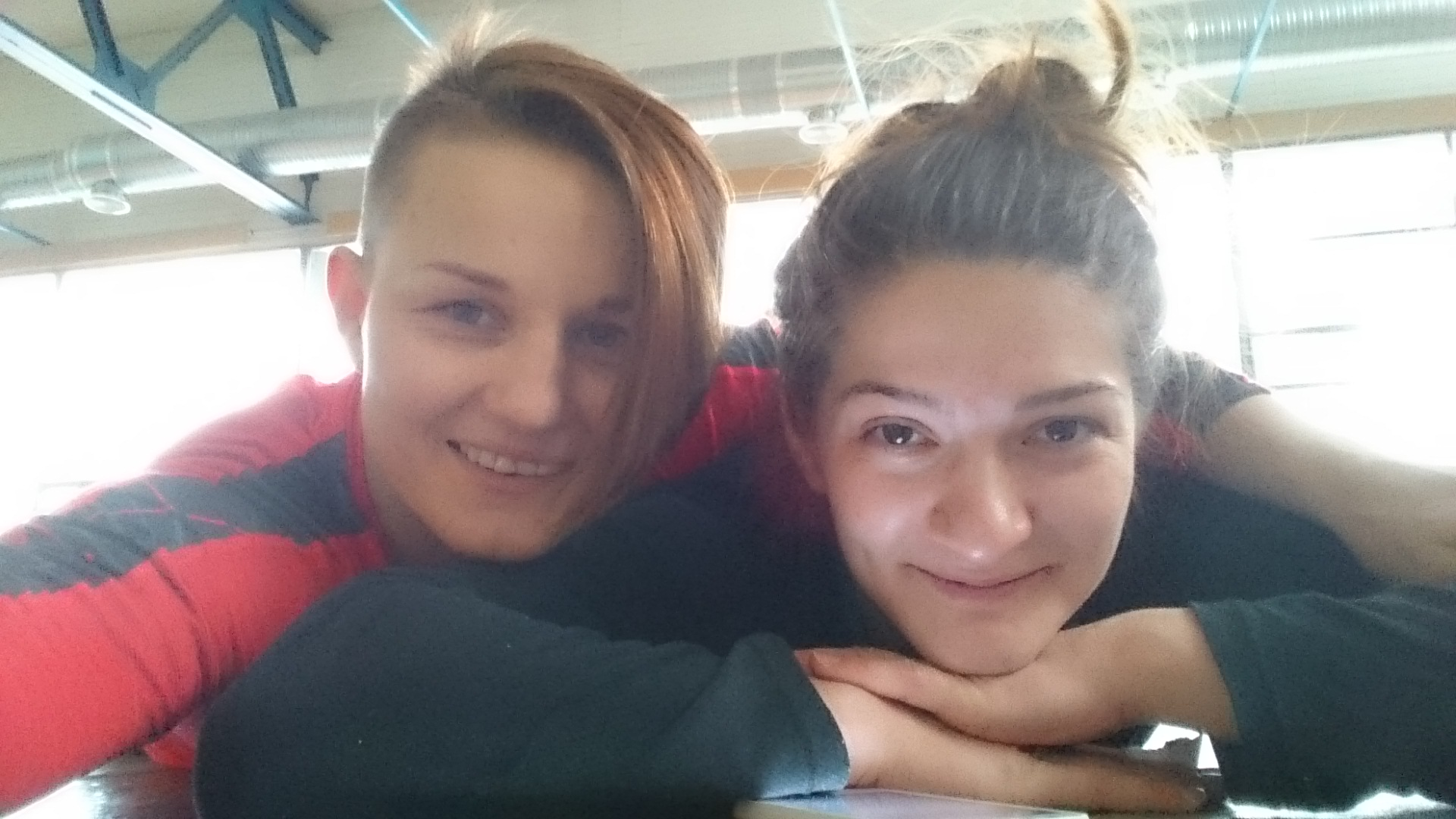
- Anna Kharitonova (left) & Anastasiya Valova

Personal information
- Full name: Anna Igoryevna Kharitonova
- Nationality: Russia
- Born: 2 March 1985 (age 41) Moscow, Russian SFSR
- Occupation: Judoka
- Height: 1.56 m (5 ft 1 1/2 in)
- Weight: 52 kg (115 lb)

Sport
- Sport: Judo
- Weight class: –52 kg

Achievements and titles
- Olympic Games: R16 (2008)
- World Champ.: R32 (2011)
- European Champ.: R32 (2011)
Medal record
Representing Russia
Women's judo
European U23 Championships
Gold medal – first place	2007 Salzburg	–52 kg
Silver medal – second place	2006 Moscow	–52 kg
World Juniors Championships
Bronze medal – third place	2002 Jeju	–48 kg
Bronze medal – third place	2004 Budapest	–52 kg
European Junior Championships
Silver medal – second place	2004 Sofia	–52 kg
Women's sambo
Summer Universiade
Gold medal – first place	2013 Kazan	–52 kg

Profile at external databases
- IJF: 2352
- JudoInside.com: 26452
- Updated on 25 January 2022

Anna Igoryevna Kharitonova (Russian: Анна Игоревна Харитонова; born March 12, 1985) is a Russian judoka, who played for the half-lightweight category. She is a multiple-time Russian judo champion and a two-time gold medalist for her division at the European Junior Judo Championships (2006 in Moscow and 2007 in Salzburg, Austria).

Kharitonova represented Russia at the 2008 Summer Olympics in Beijing, where she competed for the women's half-lightweight class (52 kg). She received a bye for the second preliminary round, before losing out by a waza-ari awasete ippon (two full points) and a kata guruma (shoulder wheel) to Portugal's Telma Monteiro.
