= 2011 in Deep =

Mixed martial arts events

Information
- First date: February 6, 2011
- Last date: December 18, 2011

Events
- Total events: 31

Fights
- Total fights: 325
- Title fights: 7

Chronology
2010 in Deep	2011 in Deep	2012 in Deep

The year 2011 was the 11th year in the history of Deep, a mixed martial arts promotion based in Japan. In 2011 Deep held 31 events beginning with, Deep: Shizuoka Impact 2011.

== Title fights ==
Title fights in 2011
Weight class				Method	Round	Time	Event	Notes
Megatonweight	Kazuhisa Tazawa	def.	Yuji Sakuragi	Submission (Rear-Naked Choke)	2	0:54	Deep: 52 Impact	(Note: For the Deep Megatonweight Championship.)
Light Heavyweight	Yoshiyuki Nakanishi (c)	def.	Bernard Ackah	KO (Head Kick)	1	1:07	Deep: 54 Impact	(Note: For the Deep Light Heavyweight Championship.)
Bantamweight	Takafumi Otsuka	def.	Hiroshi Nakamura	Decision (Unanimous)	3	5:00	Deep: 54 Impact	(Note: For the Deep Bantamweight Championship.)
Lightweight	Mizuto Hirota	def.	Katsunori Kikuno (c)	Decision (Unanimous)	3	5:00	Deep: 55 Impact	(Note: For the Deep Lightweight Championship.)
Featherweight	Koichiro Matsumoto (c)	def.	Tatsunao Nagakura	TKO (Corner Stoppage)	2	2:48	Deep: 55 Impact	(Note: For the Deep Featherweight Championship.)
Megatonweight	Levan Razmadze	def.	Kazuhisa Tazawa (c)	Submission (Keylock)	1	1:29	Deep: 55 Impact	(Note: For the Deep Megatonweight Championship.)
Welterweight	Yuya Shirai (c)	def.	Taisuke Okuno	Decision (Unanimous)	3	5:00	Deep: 56 Impact	(Note: For the Deep Welterweight Championship.)

== Events list ==
#	Event title	Date	Arena	Location
167	Deep: Oyaji Deep	December 18, 2011	Asunal Kanayama Hall	Nagoya
166	Deep / Smash: Japan MMA League 2011 Semifinals	December 17, 2011	Shinjuku Face	Tokyo
165	Deep: 56 Impact	December 16, 2011	Korakuen Hall	Tokyo
164	Deep: Future King Tournament 2011	December 10, 2011	Shinkiba 1st Ring	Tokyo
163	Deep: Cage Impact 2011 in Toyama	November 27, 2011	Toyama Event Plaza	Toyama
162	Deep: Cage Impact 2011 in Tokyo, 2nd Round	October 29, 2011	Differ Ariake	Tokyo
161	Deep: Cage Impact 2011 in Tokyo, 1st Round	October 29, 2011	Differ Ariake	Tokyo
160	Deep: clubDeep Nagoya: Kobudo Fight 3	October 9, 2011	Asunal Kanayama Hall	Nagoya
159	Deep / Smash: Japan MMA League 2011 vol. 6	October 8, 2011	Shinkiba 1st Ring	Tokyo
158	Deep: Cage Impact 2011 in Hamamatsu	September 18, 2011	Act City	Hamamatsu
157	Deep: Osaka Impact	September 4, 2011	Matsushita IMP Hall	Osaka
156	Deep / Smash: Japan MMA League 2011 vol. 5	September 3, 2011	Shinkiba 1st Ring	Tokyo
155	Deep: 55 Impact	August 26, 2011	Korakuen Hall	Tokyo
154	Deep: clubDeep in Diana 2	August 21, 2011	Club Diana	Tokyo
153	Deep / Smash: Japan MMA League 2011 vol. 4	August 20, 2011	Shinkiba 1st Ring	Tokyo
152	Deep: Beach Fight: Mach Festival	August 13, 2011	N/A	Ichinomiya
151	Deep: clubDeep Toyama: Rookies and Oyaji Deep	August 7, 2011	Toyama Event Plaza	Toyama
150	Deep: Cage Impact 2011 in Nagoya	July 10, 2011	Zepp Nagoya	Nagoya
149	Deep / Smash: Japan MMA League 2011 vol. 3	July 2, 2011	Shinkiba 1st Ring	Tokyo
148	Deep: 54 Impact	June 24, 2011	Korakuen Hall	Tokyo
147	Deep / Smash: Japan MMA League 2011 vol. 2	June 18, 2011	Shinkiba 1st Ring	Tokyo
146	Deep: Tokyo Impact 2	June 5, 2011	Shinjuku Face	Tokyo
145	Deep: Kobudo Fight Future Challenge 10	May 22, 2011	Kobudo Martial Arts Communication Space, Tiger Hall	Nagoya
144	Deep / Smash: Japan MMA League 2011: Raising an Army	May 7, 2011	Shinkiba 1st Ring	Tokyo
143	Deep: clubDeep in Diana	April 24, 2011	Club Diana	Tokyo
142	Deep: 53 Impact	April 22, 2011	Korakuen Hall	Tokyo
141	Deep: Annihilate!	March 13, 2011	Shibuya Ax	Tokyo
140	Deep: Tokyo Impact	February 27, 2011	Shinjuku Face	Tokyo
139	Deep: 52 Impact	February 25, 2011	Korakuen Hall	Tokyo
138	Deep: clubDeep Nagoya: Kobudo Fight 2	February 13, 2011	Asunal Kanayama Hall	Nagoya
137	Deep: Shizuoka Impact 2011	February 6, 2011	Twin Messe	Shizuoka

== Deep: Shizuoka Impact 2011 ==
Deep: Shizuoka Impact 2011 was an event held on February 6, 2011, at Twin Messe in Shizuoka.

=== Results ===
Main Card
Weight class				Method	Round	Time	Notes
	Ryota Matsui	def.	Takayuki Ishihara	Submission (Armbar)	1	1:51
	Yuta Sasaki	vs.	Yusuke Kagiyama	Draw	2	5:00
	Hiroki Aoki	def.	Kosuke Umeda	Submission (Triangle Choke)	2	4:35
	Kleber Koike Erbst	def.	Shinichiro Tanaka	Submission (Triangle Choke)	1	3:18
	Takeshi Kasugai	def.	Takamasa Kiuchi	TKO (Punches)	2	4:37
	Hiroyuki Nagai	def.	Yoichi Ozawa	Submission (Armbar)	1	1:28
	Daisuke Endo	def.	Hiroshi Sato	Decision (Unanimous)	2	5:00
	Anderson Shiroma Miura	def.	Yasuto Makino	Submission (Rear-Naked Choke)	2	1:15
	Shinsuke Takeda	def.	Takahiro Ito	Submission (Rear-Naked Choke)	1	4:17
	Tsuyoshi Ito	def.	Tatsuya Masuda	Submission (Arm-Triangle Choke)	2	3:02
	Kenya Yamanaka	def.	Takashi Sugai	Submission (Arm-Triangle Choke)	2	2:28
	Kenichi Serizawa	def.	Mitsuhiro Okada	Decision (Majority)	2	5:00

== Deep: clubDeep Nagoya: Kobudo Fight 2 ==
Deep: clubDeep Nagoya: Kobudo Fight 2 was an event held on February 13, 2011, at Asunal Kanayama Hall in Nagoya.

=== Results ===
Main Card
Weight class				Method	Round	Time	Notes
	Akira Kibe	def.	Isao Terada	Decision (Majority)	2	5:00
	Atsuhiro Tsuboi	def.	Jin Kazeta	TKO (Punches)	1	3:28
	Sadao Kondo	def.	Naoki Matsushita	KO (Punches)	2	1:21
	Isamu Sugiuchi	def.	Kenichi Hattori	Submission (Rear-Naked Choke)	2	4:07
	Nobuhiro Yoshitake	def.	Hiroyuki Tsuzuki	KO (Punch)	2	1:54
	Takao Nakajima	def.	Katsuya Ishida	Decision (Unanimous)	2	5:00
	Harushige Shinokawa	def.	Hisanori Toyokawa	TKO (Doctor Stoppage)	1	5:00
	Naoki Kawai	def.	Takamasa Murakami	Submission (Armbar)	1	0:53
	Riki Kanesada	def.	Takuya Asakawa	TKO (Punches)	1	1:07

== Deep: 52 Impact ==
Deep: 52 Impact was an event held on January 24, 2011, at Korakuen Hall in Tokyo.

=== Results ===
Main Card
Weight class				Method	Round	Time	Notes
Megatonweight	Kazuhisa Tazawa	def.	Yuji Sakuragi	Submission (Rear-Naked Choke)	2	0:54	(Note: For the Deep Megatonweight Championship.)
	Ryuta Sakurai	def.	Yoshiyuki Nakanishi	Submission (Armbar)	3	3:48
	Hiroshi Nakamura	def.	Masakazu Imanari	Decision (Unanimous)	3	5:00
	Shoji Maruyama	def.	Tomoya Kato	TKO (Doctor Stoppage)	1	1:27
	Seo Hee Ham	def.	Saori Ishioka	Decision (Unanimous)	2	5:00
	Takeshi Yamazaki	def.	Katsunori Tsuda	Technical Submission (Armbar)	1	1:33
	Shigetoshi Iwase	def.	Yoshitomo Watanabe	TKO (Punches)	1	2:42
	Ken Hasegawa	def.	Noriaki Oshida	Submission (Hammerlock)	1	1:15
	Tatsumitsu Wada	def.	Sakae Kasuya	Decision (Unanimous)	2	5:00
	Masato Kobayashi	def.	Ryo Masuda	Decision (Unanimous)	2	5:00
	Yoshihiro Tomioka	def.	Luiz Andrade I	TKO (Punches)	2	4:56

== Deep: Tokyo Impact ==
Deep: Tokyo Impact was an event held on February 27, 2011, at Shinjuku Face in Tokyo.

=== Results ===
Main Card
Weight class				Method	Round	Time	Notes
	Yasushi Kitazaki	def.	Hiroyuki Nozawa	KO (Punch)	1	0:21
	Yutaka Ueda	def.	Jung-Won Lee	Submission (Guillotine Choke)	1	1:45
	Yoshifumi Nakamura	def.	Naoki Tajima	Decision (Unanimous)	2	5:00
	Yutaka Kobayashi	def.	Juri Ohara	Decision (Unanimous)	2	5:00
	Yoshitaka Ebina	def.	Mitsumasa Matsumoto	TKO (Punches)	1	2:29
	Makoto Kamaya	def.	Chiaki Wakana	Submission (Guillotine Choke)	1	1:56
	Tatsuhito Satsuma	def.	Seong-Jae Kim	Decision (Unanimous)	2	5:00
	Kazuki Kinjo	def.	Tatsuya Suzuki	KO (Punch)	2	1:03
	Takahiro Ashida	def.	Shuya Arimura	KO (Punch)	1	0:37
	Suguru Hayasaka	def.	Shun Yoshioka	Decision (Unanimous)	2	5:00

== Deep: Annihilate! ==
Deep: Annihilate! was an event held on March 13, 2011, at Shibuya Ax in Tokyo.

== Deep: 53 Impact ==
Deep: 53 Impact was an event held on April 22, 2011, at Korakuen Hall in Tokyo.

=== Results ===
Main Card
Weight class				Method	Round	Time	Notes
	Kazuo Misaki	def.	Akira Shoji	TKO (Punches)	2	1:13
	Satoru Kitaoka	def.	Jutaro Nakao	Decision (Unanimous)	3	5:00
	Eiji Mitsuoka	def.	Jung Gyeong Lee	Submission (Punches)	1	3:50
	Tatsumitsu Wada	def.	Yoshiki Harada	Decision (Unanimous)	2	5:00
	Seigo Mizuguchi	def.	Mamoru Nakamura	TKO (Punches)	1	0:53
	Katsuaki Furuki	def.	Yoshitaka Ebina	Decision (Majority)	2	5:00
	Yasushi Kitazaki	def.	Hidehiko Hasegawa	Decision (Unanimous)	2	5:00
	Luiz Andrade I	def.	Yutaka Ueda	Technical Submission (Armbar)	2	0:52
	Makoto Kamaya	def.	Sakae Kasuya	Technical Submission (Rear-Naked Choke)	2	1:46

== Deep: clubDeep in Diana ==
Deep: clubDeep in Diana was an event held on April 24, 2011, at Club Diana in Tokyo.

=== Results ===
Main Card
Weight class				Method	Round	Time	Notes
	Takahiro Kawanaka	def.	Hiroki Sato	Decision (Majority)	2	5:00
	Levan Razmadze	def.	Ryota Kitamura	Submission (Armbar)	1	0:56
	Takashige Hirukawa	vs.	Suguru Hayasaka	Draw	2	5:00
	Yuta Watanabe	def.	Go Sato	TKO (Punches)	1	1:01
	Yusuke Kagiyama	def.	Shuhei Azuma	Submission (Guillotine Choke)	1	1:03
	Komei Sugawara	def.	Daisuke Yamamoto	Decision (Unanimous)	2	5:00
	Muneyuki Sato	def.	Yoshihiro Sasaki	Decision (Unanimous)	2	5:00
	Nobuhito Irei	def.	Yasuto Makino	Submission (Arm-Triangle Choke)	1	2:27
	Juri Ohara	def.	Motomichi Mori	TKO (Punches)	2	0:27
	Tatsuya Obitsu	def.	Junichi Ishino	Submission (Triangle Choke)	1	2:45
	Noriya Sasaki	def.	Satoru Endo	Decision (Unanimous)	2	3:00

== Deep / Smash: Japan MMA League 2011: Raising an Army ==
Deep / Smash: Japan MMA League 2011: Raising an Army was an event held on May 7, 2011, at Shinkiba 1st Ring in Tokyo.

=== Results ===
Main Card
Weight class				Method	Round	Time	Notes
	Seita Katsuki	def.	Yusaku Fujisawa	Decision (Unanimous)	2	5:00
	Akio Tasaka	vs.	Kotaro Otsuka	Draw	2	5:00
	Teruo Kawajiri	def.	Toshifumi Yamazaki	Submission (Armbar)	1	4:40
	Toshinori Tsunemura	def.	Gaku Suwazono	Submission (Armbar)	1	4:10
	Shuhei Azuma	def.	Kotaro Kazama	Submission (Keylock)	1	4:33
	Takeshi Ogane	def.	Joe LaChance	Decision (Split)	2	5:00
	Shotaro Kanada	def.	Takemori Ishibashi	Submission (Achilles Lock)	1	1:28
	Mitsuhiro Okada	def.	Toshiya Urabe	Decision (Unanimous)	2	5:00
	Yuki Motoya	def.	Yuta Horiuchi	Submission (Rear-Naked Choke)	1	4:38

== Deep: Kobudo Fight Future Challenge 10 ==
Deep: Kobudo Fight Future Challenge 10 was an event held on May 22, 2011, at Kobudo Martial Arts Communication Space, Tiger Hall in Nagoya.

=== Results ===
Main Card
Weight class				Method	Round	Time	Notes
	Naoyuki Kato	def.	Harushige Shinokawa	KO (Punch)	1	2:55
	Daisuke Kanehira	def.	Yasutomo Katsuki	Submission (Rear-Naked Choke)	1	3:27
	Jun Osawa	def.	Hironobu Yoshida	TKO (Punches)	2	3:53
	Yusuke Tsunoda	def.	Hidenori Urayama	Submission (Guillotine Choke)	1	4:35
	Kenya Yamanaka	def.	Nobuyuki Kanaizuka	Decision (Unanimous)	2	5:00

== Deep: Tokyo Impact 2 ==
Deep: Tokyo Impact 2 was an event held on June 5, 2011, at Shinjuku Face in Tokyo.

=== Results ===
Main Card
Weight class				Method	Round	Time	Notes
	Daijiro Matsui	vs.	Hiroki Ozaki	Draw	2	5:00
	Hidehiko Hasegawa	def.	Naoji Mikoshiba	Decision (Majority)	2	5:00
	Kenji Nagai	def.	Jun Ando	TKO (Punches)	2	2:23
	Ken Hasegawa	def.	Mamoru Nakamura	TKO (Punches)	1	1:09
	Takashi Tomoda	def.	Makoto Dochi	Decision (Split)	2	5:00
	Constantin Ionut	def.	Tsuyoshi Kurihara	TKO (Punches)	1	2:00
	Suguru Hayasaka	vs.	Kazuki Itaya	Draw	2	5:00
	Juri Ohara	def.	Isamu Nagase	Decision (Unanimous)	2	5:00

== Deep / Smash: Japan MMA League 2011 vol. 2 ==
Deep / Smash: Japan MMA League 2011 vol. 2 was an event held on June 18, 2011, at Shinkiba 1st Ring in Tokyo.

=== Results ===
Main Card
Weight class				Method	Round	Time	Notes
	Ryota Minawa	def.	Taro Bando	Decision (Majority)	2	5:00
	Nobuhito Irei	def.	Takeyoshi Ogawa	TKO (Punches)	1	4:13
	Ryutaro Takahashi	def.	Takuya Inoue	TKO (Punch)	1	0:05
	Kenichi Kinoshita	def.	Tomonari Koinuma	TKO (Punches)	1	2:30
	Takeshi Kasugai	def.	Takahiro Yoshida	Submission (Rear-Naked Choke)	1	2:33
	Wataru Sasaki	def.	Yusuke Akiyama	KO (Slam)	2	1:03
	Yuhi Takemoto	def.	Teppei Suwabe	Submission (Armbar)	1	1:02
	Michito Abe	def.	Koji Sato	TKO (Punches)	2	1:55
	Satoshi Inaba	def.	Kazuma Murakoshi	TKO (Punches)	1	1:41
	Kenichiro Marui	def.	Yasuyuki Moritake	Submission (Armbar)	1	4:02

== Deep: 54 Impact ==
Deep: 54 Impact was an event held on June 24, 2011, at Korakuen Hall in Tokyo.

=== Results ===
Main Card
Weight class				Method	Round	Time	Notes
Light Heavyweight	Yoshiyuki Nakanishi (c)	def.	Bernard Ackah	KO (Head Kick)	1	1:07	(Note: For the Deep Light Heavyweight Championship.)
Bantamweight	Takafumi Otsuka	def.	Hiroshi Nakamura	Decision (Unanimous)	3	5:00	(Note: For the Deep Bantamweight Championship.)
	Kazunori Yokota	def.	Shoji Maruyama	Decision (Unanimous)	3	5:00
	Ryo Chonan	def.	Shigetoshi Iwase	KO (Punch)	1	4:45
	Levan Razmadze	def.	Seigo Mizuguchi	TKO (Punches)	1	3:21
	A-Sol Kwon	def.	Yoshihiro Tomioka	Decision (Unanimous)	2	5:00
	Tomomi Iwama	def.	Myung-Sik Kwak	Submission (Heel Hook)	1	4:53
	Hideto Tatsumi	def.	Hiromitsu Kanehara	Decision (Unanimous)	2	5:00
	Hirohide Fujinuma	def.	Kentaro Onishi	TKO (Punches)	1	1:26
	Yoshiki Harada	def.	Toru Harai	KO (Punch)	1	2:53
	Alex Soto	vs.	Seiji Akao	Draw	2	5:00
	Yoshitomo Watanabe	def.	Go Sato	TKO (Punches)	1	3:20
	Yasuhiro Kawasaki	def.	Luiz Andrade I	Decision (Majority)	2	5:00

== Deep / Smash: Japan MMA League 2011 vol. 3 ==
Deep / Smash: Japan MMA League 2011 vol. 3 was an event held on July 2, 2011, at Shinkiba 1st Ring in Tokyo.

=== Results ===
Main Card
Weight class				Method	Round	Time	Notes
	Masahito Iguchi	def.	Hideo Matsui	Technical Decision (Unanimous)	2	0:31
	Gaku Suwazono	def.	Kotaro Otsuka	Decision (Unanimous)	2	5:00
	Shuhei Azuma	def.	Teruo Kawajiri	TKO (Doctor Stoppage)	2	4:05
	Atsushi Nagayama	def.	Sekai Baba	Submission (Armbar)	2	3:34
	Sho Kogane	def.	Joe LaChance	TKO (Punches)	1	1:23
	Shotaro Kanada	def.	So Matsumoto	Submission (Rear-Naked Choke)	1	0:38
	Mitsuhiro Okada	def.	Takeshi Ogane	Submission (Rear-Naked Choke)	2	1:13
	Mitsuhiko Ikezaki	vs.	Jun Osawa	Draw	2	5:00
	Yusuke Mitsuzuka	def.	Ken Saotome	Submission (Guillotine Choke)	1	0:30
	Tatsuya Tomozane	def.	Noriya Sasaki	Submission (Rear-Naked Choke)	1	1:46
	Makoto Sato	def.	Koji Katahira	Submission (Armbar)	1	4:17

== Deep: Cage Impact 2011 in Nagoya ==
Deep: Cage Impact 2011 in Nagoya was an event held on July 10, 2011, at Zepp Nagoya in Nagoya.

=== Results ===
Main Card
Weight class				Method	Round	Time	Notes
	Hiroyuki Abe	def.	Atsuhiro Tsuboi	Decision (Unanimous)	2	5:00
	Akira Kibe	def.	Hirotaka Miyakawa	TKO (Punches)	1	1:49
	Yutaka Ueda	vs.	Naoki Matsushita	Draw	2	5:00
	Hiroki Aoki	def.	Takahiro Kajita	Submission (Rear-Naked Choke)	2	2:15
	Teruhiko Kubo	def.	Katsunori Kobayashi	Submission (Armbar)	1	1:40
	Kenichi Hattori	def.	Muneyuki Sato	Submission (Rear-Naked Choke)	1	2:48
	Seiji Kawasaki	def.	Shinichiro Shinichiro	TKO (Punches)	1	0:47
	Naoyuki Kato	def.	Takao Nakajima	Decision (Unanimous)	2	5:00
	Akito Sakimura	def.	Nobuyuki Kanaizuka	Decision (Unanimous)	2	5:00
	Alan Yoshihiro Yamaniha	def.	Daisuke Kanehira	Submission (Rear-Naked Choke)	2	3:25
	Kenya Yamanaka	def.	Shinji Maeguchi	Submission (Rear-Naked Choke)	2	1:55
	Yuki Motoya	def.	Katsuya Ishida	TKO (Punches)	1	1:46
	Yoshinobu Kawamura	vs.	Yusuke Tsunoda	Draw	2	5:00
	Harufumi Saito	def.	Soichi Baba	TKO (Knee and Punches)	1	0:16

== Deep: clubDeep Toyama: Rookies and Oyaji Deep ==
Deep: clubDeep Toyama: Rookies and Oyaji Deep was an event held on August 7, 2011, at Toyama Event Plaza in Toyama.

=== Results ===
Main Card
Weight class				Method	Round	Time	Notes
	Shinobu Aoyama	def.	Hirotaka Himeno	Submission (Rear-Naked Choke)	2	2:23
	Atsushi Yamada	def.	Masuro Saeki	TKO (Punches)	1	0:13
	Teppei Masuda	def.	Gen Ikeda	Decision (Unanimous)	2	5:00
	Harushige Shinokawa	def.	Daijiro Sakama	TKO (Punches)	1	2:28
	Yoshiyuki Katahira	def.	Nobuo Kosaka	TKO (Punches)	1	3:21
	Jun Osawa	def.	Shuji Morishita	TKO (Punches)	2	4:18
	Mitsuhiro Okada	def.	Sho Ashina	Decision (Unanimous)	2	3:00
	Yuki Nishi	def.	Noriyuki Kurimoto	Decision (Majority)	2	3:00
	Tomohiro Takayanagi	def.	Tsutomu Morioka	Decision (Majority)	2	3:00
	Kiyohiro Kitagawa	vs.	Masashi Himeno	Draw	2	3:00
	Katsunori Kobayashi	def.	Hajime Yamasaki	Submission (Guillotine Choke)	1	1:44
	Satoshi Shimono	def.	Yasuji Numa	Decision (Unanimous)	2	3:00
	Shigeaki Tani	def.	Shungo Maeda	TKO (Punches)	1	0:18
	Hirochika Matsubara	vs.	Genji Yamamoto	Draw	2	3:00
	Takeshi Ogaito	def.	Ramen Man	Decision (Majority)	2	3:00
	Tomofumi Nakamura	def.	Yuji Tanaka	Decision (Unanimous)	2	3:00
	Harufumi Saito	def.	Oya Takato	Submission (Triangle Choke)	1	1:51

== Deep: Beach Fight: Mach Festival ==
Deep: Beach Fight: Mach Festival was an event held on August 13, 2011, in Ichinomiya.

== Deep / Smash: Japan MMA League 2011 vol. 4 ==
Deep / Smash: Japan MMA League 2011 vol. 4 was an event held on August 20, 2011, at Shinkiba 1st Ring in Tokyo.

=== Results ===
Main Card
Weight class				Method	Round	Time	Notes
	Shinichiro Tanaka	def.	Tatsuya Tomozane	Decision (Unanimous)	2	5:00
	Genzo Kubota	vs.	Takeyoshi Ogawa	Draw	2	5:00
	Kazushi Okutsu	def.	Tomonari Koinuma	TKO (Punches)	1	4:23
	Nobuhito Irei	def.	Tsubasa Akiyama	Submission (Kimura)	1	1:13
	Shunsuke Sakamoto	vs.	Takahiro Tsuenaga	Draw	2	5:00
	Yoshihisa Tsuenaga	def.	Yasuto Makino	Decision (Majority)	2	5:00
	Yuhi Takemoto	def.	Yasuyuki Moritake	Submission (Armbar)	1	0:38
	Satoshi Inaba	def.	Yusuke Akiyama	TKO (Punches)	1	3:11
	Ryota Abe	def.	Yojin Iwara	Decision (Unanimous)	2	5:00
	Yasutaka Hamaji	def.	Hiyoshi Sarawato	Submission (Armbar)	1	3:20
	Masayuki Amano	def.	Keisuke Nakayama	Decision (Unanimous)	2	5:00
	Tomoyuki Manabe	def.	Kei Takahashi	Decision (Unanimous)	2	5:00

== Deep: clubDeep in Diana 2 ==
Deep: clubDeep in Diana 2 was an event held on August 21, 2011, at Club Diana in Tokyo.

=== Results ===
Main Card
Weight class				Method	Round	Time	Notes
	Wataru Sasaki	def.	Takahiro Ashida	Submission (Kimura)	1	2:37
	Chow Tegi	def.	Kentaro Onishi	Decision (Unanimous)	2	5:00
	Takeo Iida	def.	Yoshihiro Sasaki	Submission (Armbar)	1	2:22
	Yuki Motoya	def.	Kazuki Itaya	TKO (Punches)	2	1:51
	Toshinori Tsunemura	def.	Shotaro Kanada	Submission (Armbar)	1	2:33
	Yusuke Mitsuzuka	def.	Tomoyuki Shimoyama	Submission (Armbar)	1	0:28
	Satoru Endo	def.	Ken Suzue	TKO (Corner Stoppage)	1	1:50
	Hiroyasu Suzuki	def.	Kenji Nagayasu	TKO (Punches)	1	2:25

== Deep: 55 Impact ==
Deep: 55 Impact was an event held on August 26, 2011, at Korakuen Hall in Tokyo.

=== Results ===
Main Card
Weight class				Method	Round	Time	Notes
Lightweight	Mizuto Hirota	def.	Katsunori Kikuno (c)	Decision (Unanimous)	3	5:00	(Note: For the Deep Lightweight Championship.)
Featherweight	Koichiro Matsumoto (c)	def.	Tatsunao Nagakura	TKO (Corner Stoppage)	2	2:48	(Note: For the Deep Featherweight Championship.)
Megatonweight	Levan Razmadze	def.	Kazuhisa Tazawa (c)	Submission (Keylock)	1	1:29	(Note: For the Deep Megatonweight Championship.)
	Ryuta Sakurai	def.	Katsuyori Shibata	TKO (Punches)	2	3:04
	Tatsumitsu Wada	def.	Daiki Hata	Decision (Majority)	2	5:00
	Ryuta Noji	def.	Shuji Morikawa	TKO (Corner Stoppage)	1	2:56
	Motoki Miyazawa	def.	Yasushi Kitazaki	Submission (Rear-Naked Choke)	2	3:36
	Yuki Niimura	def.	Shunsuke Inoue	KO (Punch)	1	0:27
	Makoto Kamaya	def.	Tomohiko Hori	Decision (Majority)	2	5:00
	Amanda Lucas	def.	Hikaru Shinohara	Technical Submission (Armbar)	1	4:37

== Deep / Smash: Japan MMA League 2011 vol. 5 ==
Deep / Smash: Japan MMA League 2011 vol. 5 was an event held on September 3, 2011, at Shinkiba 1st Ring in Tokyo.

=== Results ===
Main Card
Weight class				Method	Round	Time	Notes
	Sho Kogane	def.	Takeshi Ogane	Decision (Unanimous)	2	5:00
	Keita Miyamoto	def.	Yuta Horiuchi	Submission (Armbar)	1	1:11
	Gilson Sone	def.	Satoshi Yamazaki	Submission (Arm-Triangle Choke)	1	2:11
	Jun Osawa	def.	Yoshiaki Sasaki	Submission (Rear-Naked Choke)	2	1:17
	Mitsuhiro Okada	def.	Yamato Hamamatsu	Decision (Unanimous)	2	5:00
	Seita Katsuki	def.	Masahito Iguchi	Decision (Unanimous)	2	5:00
	Shuhei Azuma	def.	Akio Tasaka	Decision (Unanimous)	2	5:00
	Yusaku Fujisawa	def.	Fumihiro Kondo	TKO (Punches)	1	4:15
	Ryo Iseki	def.	Hideo Matsui	TKO (Punches)	2	4:02
	Yasufumi Suzaki	def.	Teruo Kawajiri	Submission (Armbar)	1	4:04

== Deep: Osaka Impact ==
Deep: Osaka Impact was an event held on September 4, 2011, at Matsushita IMP Hall in Osaka.

=== Results ===
Main Card
Weight class				Method	Round	Time	Notes
	Seichi Ikemoto	def.	Hiroki Aoki	Decision (Unanimous)	3	5:00
	Yasuaki Kishimoto	def.	Jutaro Nakao	Decision (Unanimous)	3	5:00
	Young Choi	def.	Kenji Nagai	TKO (Punches)	1	4:34
	Seiji Akao	def.	Yusaku Nakamura	Submission (Rear-Naked Choke)	2	1:17
	Toshihiro Shimizu	def.	Young Soo Kim	TKO (Punches)	1	4:19
	Yusuke Kagiyama	def.	Tomoyuki Fukami	Decision (Unanimous)	2	5:00
	Taro Kusano	vs.	Yutaka Kobayashi	Draw	2	5:00
	Sadae Numata	def.	Yuka Butterfly Knife	TKO (Knees and Punches)	1	5:00

== Deep: Cage Impact 2011 in Hamamatsu ==
Deep: Cage Impact 2011 in Hamamatsu was an event held on September 18, 2011, at Act City in Hamamatsu.

=== Results ===
Main Card
Weight class				Method	Round	Time	Notes
	Kleber Koike Erbst	def.	Hidenobu Koike	Submission (Triangle Choke)	1	2:16
	Henri Kakiuchi	def.	Daisuke Kanehira	Decision (Unanimous)	2	5:00
	Jacob Ito Ortiz	def.	Shun Yagi	TKO (Punches)	1	3:26
	Kensaku Sugiyama	def.	Yusuke Mitsuzuka	TKO (Punches)	1	3:31
	Yasuto Makino	def.	Akiyoshi Yamada	Decision (Unanimous)	2	5:00
	Hiroyuki Nagai	def.	William da Silva	TKO (Punches)	1	4:05
	Daisuke Yamamoto	def.	Taku Max	Submission (Rear-Naked Choke)	2	1:05
	Ricardo Vicente Yagi	def.	Yusuke Akiyama	Submission (Kimura)	1	1:27
	Tsuyoshi Ito	def.	Yasuyuki Moritake	Decision (Unanimous)	2	5:00
	Atsushi Nagayama	def.	Michito Abe	Decision (Majority)	2	5:00
	Shin Kitagawa	def.	Takaya Takaya	TKO (Punches)	1	4:29
	Hiroshi Takahashi	def.	Takeru Maekawa	Decision (Split)	2	5:00

== Deep / Smash: Japan MMA League 2011 vol. 6 ==
Deep / Smash: Japan MMA League 2011 vol. 6 was an event held on October 8, 2011, at Shinkiba 1st Ring in Tokyo.

=== Results ===
Main Card
Weight class				Method	Round	Time	Notes
	Yoshihisa Tsuenaga	def.	Masataka Hoashi	TKO (Punches)	2	1:08
	Kazuya Hirose	def.	Takahiro Tsuenaga	Submission (Inverted Triangle Choke)	1	4:05
	Koichiro Takekawa	def.	Yosuke Akachi	Decision (Unanimous)	2	5:00
	Tatsuya Tomozane	def.	Tsubasa Tsubasa	Submission (Rear-Naked Choke)	2	2:20
	Takeyoshi Ogawa	def.	Takahiro Yoshida	Submission (Armbar)	1	3:56
	Nobuhito Irei	def.	Masanori Oshio	TKO (Punches)	1	4:18
	Ryutaro Takahashi	def.	Genzo Kubota	KO (Punches)	2	3:59
	Satoshi Nakajima	def.	Masahito Moriyama	Submission (Armbar)	1	2:02
	Ryuichi Koga	def.	Tomohiro Kokuho	Decision (Majority)	2	5:00
	Koichi Ishizuka	def.	Taiyo Hayashi	Decision (Majority)	2	5:00

== Deep: clubDeep Nagoya: Kobudo Fight 3 ==
Deep: clubDeep Nagoya: Kobudo Fight 3 was an event held on October 9, 2011, at Asunal Kanayama Hall in Nagoya.

=== Results ===
Main Card
Weight class				Method	Round	Time	Notes
	Seiji Akao	def.	Tony Reyes	Decision (Majority)	2	5:00
	Akira Kibe	def.	Hirotaka Himeno	TKO (Punches)	1	4:50
	Hiroyuki Tsuzuki	def.	Harushige Shinokawa	KO (Punch)	1	1:51
	Fumitoshi Ishikawa	def.	Kentaro Abe	TKO (Punches)	1	2:11
	Takeshi Kasugai	def.	Yuki Motoya	Submission (Armbar)	2	2:04
	Katsuyoshi Beppu	vs.	Shinichiro Tanaka	Draw	2	5:00
	Hiroki Matsubara	def.	Naoki Kawai	Decision (Majority)	2	5:00
	Kenichi Kinoshita	def.	Yuki Nishi	Submission (Rear-Naked Choke)	1	2:55
	Yusuke Tsunoda	def.	Yoshinobu Kawamura	Submission (Heel Hook)	2	2:28
	Kinno Kinno	def.	Katsuo Hirose	KO (Head Kick)	1	2:55

== Deep: Cage Impact 2011 in Tokyo, 1st Round ==
Deep: Cage Impact 2011 in Tokyo, 1st Round was an event held on October 29, 2011, at Differ Ariake in Tokyo.

=== Results ===
Main Card
Weight class				Method	Round	Time	Notes
	Katsunori Kikuno	def.	Kwang Hee Lee	TKO (Retirement)	1	4:59
	Kazunori Yokota	def.	Katsuya Toida	TKO (Soccer Kicks and Punches)	2	0:25
	Daisuke Nakamura	def.	Chang Hyun Kim	Submission (Armbar)	3	3:19
	Shoji Maruyama	def.	Yusuke Kagiyama	Decision (Unanimous)	2	5:00
	Tomohiko Hori	vs.	Yoshiki Harada	Draw (Unanimous)	2	5:00
	Amanda Lucas	def.	Mika Harigai	Submission (Rear-Naked Choke)	1	4:32
	Hideto Tatsumi	def.	Kenji Nagai	TKO (Punches)	1	2:13
	Juri Ohara	def.	Luiz Andrade I	TKO (Punches)	1	4:27
	Hirotaka Miyakawa	def.	Sakae Kasuya	KO (Punch)	1	2:52
	Hideto Kondo	def.	Yutaka Kobayashi	Submission (Guillotine Choke)	2	0:55
	Shun Yoshioka	def.	Makoto Sato	TKO (Punches)	1	4:25

== Deep: Cage Impact 2011 in Tokyo, 2nd Round ==
Deep: Cage Impact 2011 in Tokyo, 2nd Round was an event held on October 29, 2011, at Differ Ariake in Tokyo.

=== Results ===
Main Card
Weight class				Method	Round	Time	Notes
	Choi Doo-ho	def.	Nobuhiro Obiya	KO (Flying Knee)	3	0:15
	Ryo Chonan	def.	Naoki Samukawa	Decision (Unanimous)	3	5:00
	Hiroshi Nakamura	def.	Yoshiro Maeda	Decision (Majority)	3	5:00
	Yuya Shirai	def.	Yoshitomo Watanabe	Decision (Unanimous)	2	5:00
	Yoshiyuki Nakanishi	def.	Yusuke Masuda	TKO (Soccer Kicks)	2	0:33
	Shunsuke Inoue	def.	Bernard Ackah	TKO (Punches)	1	2:30
	Ken Hasegawa	def.	Seigo Mizuguchi	Decision (Unanimous)	2	5:00
	Hirohide Fujinuma	def.	Atsushi Yamada	Decision (Unanimous)	2	5:00
	Yusuke Sakashita	def.	Hiroki Sato	Decision (Majority)	2	5:00
	Yuki Niimura	def.	Shuji Morikawa	TKO (Stomps)	1	1:45
	Masato Kobayashi	vs.	Takashige Hirukawa	Draw (Majority)	2	5:00
	Munehiro Kin	def.	Wataru Sasaki	Decision (Unanimous)	2	5:00

== Deep: Cage Impact 2011 in Toyama ==
Deep: Cage Impact 2011 in Toyama was an event held on November 27, 2011, at Toyama Event Plaza in Toyama.

=== Results ===
Main Card
Weight class				Method	Round	Time	Notes
	Yoshihiro Tomioka	def.	Yasuhiro Kawasaki	TKO (Punches)	2	4:45
	Kosuke Umeda	def.	Mitsuhiro Okada	Decision (Unanimous)	2	5:00
	Naoyuki Kato	def.	Yuki Motoya	TKO (Punches)	2	4:08
	Hideki Kiyota	def.	Hirotaka Himeno	Submission (Triangle Choke)	1	1:12
	Hiroshi Sato	def.	Yuki Nishi	TKO (Punches)	1	4:15
	Kenichi Kinoshita	def.	Shuji Morishita	TKO (Punches)	1	2:04
	Yasufumi Suzaki	def.	Kenya Yamanaka	Submission (Guillotine Choke)	1	1:41
	Shin Kitagawa	def.	Genzo Kubota	Decision (Unanimous)	2	5:00
	Yasuji Numa	def.	Shigeaki Tani	TKO (Punches)	1	1:40
	Tomofumi Nakamura	def.	Akira Kisaki	Decision (Unanimous)	2	3:00

== Deep: Future King Tournament 2011 ==
Deep: Future King Tournament 2011 was an event held on December 10, 2011, at Shinkiba 1st Ring in Tokyo.

=== Results ===
Main Card
Weight class				Method	Round	Time	Notes
	Yoshiyuki Katahira	def.	Kazuki Nomoto	Submission (Kimura)	1	1:26
	Yu Kijima	def.	Takumi Kobayashi	Submission (Armbar)	2	2:12
	Katsuyoshi Beppu	def.	Kohei Tokeshi	Decision (Unanimous)	2	5:00
	Yuki Baba	def.	Koichi Ishizuka	Decision (Unanimous)	2	5:00
	Katsuya Ishida	def.	Takaaki Ito	Decision (Unanimous)	2	5:00
	Sota Kojima	def.	Yu Suda	Decision (Unanimous)	2	5:00
	Yoshiyuki Katahira	def.	Shinichiro Arai	Submission (Kimura)	1	0:34
	Kazuki Nomoto	def.	Luke Mori	Decision (Unanimous)	1	5:00
	Takumi Kobayashi	def.	Yusuke Kanaeda	Decision (Unanimous)	1	5:00
	Yu Kijima	def.	Takuya Oyama	Decision (Unanimous)	1	5:00
	Kohei Tokeshi	def.	Fumiya Hashimoto	Decision (Split)	1	5:00
	Katsuyoshi Beppu	def.	Taichi Nakajima	Decision (Unanimous)	1	5:00
	Koichi Ishizuka	def.	Kenichi Kinoshita	Decision (Unanimous)	1	5:00
	Yuki Baba	def.	Kenya Yamanaka	Decision (Unanimous)	1	5:00
	Takaaki Ito	def.	Minoru Ueda	Decision (Unanimous)	1	5:00
	Katsuya Ishida	def.	Atsushi Anzai	Decision (Unanimous)	1	5:00
	Sota Kojima	def.	Satoshi Nakajima	Decision (Unanimous)	1	5:00
	Yu Suda	def.	Yosuke Moriga	Decision (Split)	1	5:00
	Yoshiyuki Katahira	def.	Ryo Sakai	Submission (Kimura)	1	4:33
	Takumi Kobayashi	def.	Kazuya Kumakura	Decision (Unanimous)	1	5:00
	Yu Kijima	def.	Tatsuya Obitsu	Decision (Unanimous)	1	5:00
	Fumiya Hashimoto	def.	Yusaku Fujisawa	Decision (Unanimous)	1	5:00
	Koichi Ishizuka	def.	Naohiro Takaoka	Submission (Triangle Choke)	1	2:21
	Takaaki Ito	def.	Yukio Kishi	Decision (Unanimous)	1	5:00
	Minoru Ueda	def.	Atsushi Kato	Decision (Unanimous)	1	5:00
	Katsuya Ishida	def.	Ken Saotome	Decision (Unanimous)	1	5:00
	Atsushi Anzai	def.	Ryo Iseki	Decision (Split)	1	5:00
	Sota Kojima	def.	Senzo Ikeda	Decision (Unanimous)	1	5:00
	Takaaki Ito	def.	Hiroyasu Suzuki	Submission (Rear-Naked Choke)	1	0:46

== Deep: 56 Impact ==
Deep: 56 Impact was an event held on December 16, 2011, at Korakuen Hall in Tokyo.

=== Results ===
Main Card
Weight class				Method	Round	Time	Notes
Welterweight	Yuya Shirai (c)	def.	Taisuke Okuno	Decision (Unanimous)	3	5:00	(Note: For the Deep Welterweight Championship.)
	Choi Doo-ho	def.	Mitsuhiro Ishida	TKO (Knee and Punches)	1	1:33
	Hiroshi Nakamura	def.	Seiji Akao	Decision (Unanimous)	2	5:00
	Yusaku Nakamura	def.	Yoshiki Harada	Technical Decision (Unanimous)	1	5:00
	Seigo Mizuguchi	def.	Chang Hee Kim	KO (Punch)	1	1:38
	Muneyuki Sato	def.	Tomoya Kato	Decision (Unanimous)	2	5:00
	Yoshitomo Watanabe	def.	Kosei Kubota	TKO (Head Kick and Punches)	1	0:17
	Daisuke Endo	def.	Isao Terada	Decision (Unanimous)	2	5:00
	Takahiro Kajita	def.	Juri Ohara	Decision (Unanimous)	2	5:00
	Yoichi Fukumoto	def.	Hideto Kondo	Submission (Rear-Naked Choke)	1	4:49

== Deep / Smash: Japan MMA League 2011 Semifinals ==
Deep / Smash: Japan MMA League 2011 Semifinals was an event held on December 17, 2011, at Shinjuku Face in Tokyo.

=== Results ===
Main Card
Weight class				Method	Round	Time	Notes
	Takashi Arai	def.	Yoshihisa Tsuenaga	Decision (Unanimous)	2	5:00
	Nobuhito Irei	def.	Takahiro Tsuenaga	Submission (Rear-Naked Choke)	2	1:00
	Yuhi Takemoto	def.	Ryutaro Takahashi	Submission (Armbar)	1	0:55
	Jun Osawa	def.	Yamato Hamamatsu	Decision (Unanimous)	2	5:00
	Satoshi Watanabe	def.	Gaku Suwazono	Decision (Unanimous)	2	5:00
	Shuhei Higashi	def.	Shin Kitagawa	Decision (Unanimous)	2	5:00
	Yuta Kaneko	def.	Takayuki Iijima	TKO (Punches)	1	2:37
	Daisuke Yamaguchi	def.	Akio Tasaka	Decision (Unanimous)	2	5:00
	Takeyoshi Ogawa	def.	Hitoshi Sugiyama	TKO (Punches)	3	2
	Yojin Iwara	def.	Tsubasa Tsubasa	Submission (Rear-Naked Choke)	2	2:57
	Motoki Konno	def.	Yasuto Makino	Decision (Unanimous)	2	5:00
	Liger Narita	vs.	Yosuke Akachi	Draw (Unanimous)	2	5:00
	Kohei Nishibayashi	def.	Kenta Okuyama	Decision (Unanimous)	2	5:00
	Hitoshi Tenjo	def.	Yoshifumi Yamazaki	Decision (Unanimous)	2	5:00

== Deep: Oyaji Deep ==
Deep: Oyaji Deep was an event held on December 18, 2011, at Asunal Kanayama Hall in Nagoya.

=== Results ===
Main Card
Weight class				Method	Round	Time	Notes
	Yoshinori Fukumoto	def.	Ryuichi Tanaka	KO (Punches)	1	1:11
	Shoki Omichi	def.	Hiroyuki Tsuzuki	Submission (Armbar)	2	3:03
	Yusuke Tsunoda	def.	Michiyuki Ishibashi	TKO (Doctor Stoppage)	2	0:12
	Tsutomu Kanesada	def.	Takuya Asakawa	TKO (Punches)	1	1:33
	Yusuke Mitsuzuka	def.	Hiroshi Sakamoto	Decision (Majority)	2	5:00
	Yudai Ishida	def.	Akihisa Iwai	TKO (Doctor Stoppage)	1	5:00
	Yuki Nishi	vs.	Kinno Kinno	Draw (Split)	2	5:00
	Hiroki Nakada	def.	Ryosuke Hattori	Decision (Unanimous)	2	3:00
	Masahiro Noda	def.	Soichi Baba	Decision (Unanimous)	2	3:00
	Masanori Oshio	def.	Park Park	Decision (Unanimous)	2	3:00

== See also ==
- List of Deep champions
- List of Deep events
