= Giorgi Baindurashvili =

Georgian judoka

Personal information
- Born: 19 February 1985 (age 41)
- Occupation: Judoka

Sport
- Sport: Judo
Medal record
Men's judo
Representing Georgia
European Junior Championships
Bronze medal – third place	2004 Sofia	–73 kg

Profile at external databases
- JudoInside.com: 36807
- Updated on 9 February 2022

Giorgi Baindurashvili is a Georgian judoka.

== Achievements ==
Year	Tournament	Place	Weight class
2008	European Championships	7th	Half middleweight (81 kg)
2007	European Judo Championships	7th	Half middleweight (81 kg)
