= 2004 European Junior Judo Championships =

Judo competition

Judo 2004 European Junior Judo Championships
- Location: Sofia, Bulgaria
- Dates: 10–12 September 2004

Competition at external databases
- Links: JudoInside

The 2004 European Junior Judo Championships is an edition of the European Junior Judo Championships, organised by the International Judo Federation. It was held in Sofia, Bulgaria from 10 to 12 September 2004.

== Medal summary ==
=== Medal table ===
* Host nation (Bulgaria)

Rank	Nation	Gold	Silver	Bronze	Total
1	Netherlands (NED)	3	1	7	11
2	Hungary (HUN)	3	0	0	3
3	Georgia (GEO)	2	1	2	5
4	Russia (RUS)	1	1	7	9
5	Germany (GER)	1	1	1	3
6	Portugal (POR)	1	0	1	2
7	Greece (GRE)	1	0	0	1
7	Israel (ISR)	1	0	0	1
7	Latvia (LAT)	1	0	0	1
10	Romania (ROU)	0	2	0	2
10	Slovenia (SLO)	0	2	0	2
12	Poland (POL)	0	1	2	3
13	Bulgaria (BUL)*	0	1	1	2
14	Belgium (BEL)	0	1	0	1
14	Italy (ITA)	0	1	0	1
14	Turkey (TUR)	0	1	0	1
14	Ukraine (UKR)	0	1	0	1
18	France (FRA)	0	0	2	2
18	Great Britain (GBR)	0	0	2	2
20	Austria (AUT)	0	0	1	1
20	Finland (FIN)	0	0	1	1
20	Moldova (MDA)	0	0	1	1
Totals (22 entries)		14	14	28	56

=== Men's events ===
Event	Gold	Silver	Bronze
Extra-lightweight (−60 kg)	Jeroen Mooren (NED)	Rok Drakšič (SLO)	David Asumbani (GEO)
Extra-lightweight (−60 kg)	Jeroen Mooren (NED)	Rok Drakšič (SLO)	Shamil Nash (RUS)
Half-lightweight (−66 kg)	Tariel Zintiridis (GRE)	Costel Danculea (ROU)	Tiago Lopes (POR)
Half-lightweight (−66 kg)	Tariel Zintiridis (GRE)	Costel Danculea (ROU)	Andrey Sitnikov (RUS)
Lightweight (−73 kg)	Batradz Kaytmazov (RUS)	Marko Petric (SLO)	Giorgi Baindurashvili (GEO)
Lightweight (−73 kg)	Batradz Kaytmazov (RUS)	Marko Petric (SLO)	Vincent Verhoeven (NED)
Half-middleweight (−81 kg)	Grigol Shinjikashvili (GEO)	Tijke van de Loo (NED)	Vincent Massimino (FRA)
Half-middleweight (−81 kg)	Grigol Shinjikashvili (GEO)	Tijke van de Loo (NED)	Sergiu Remarenco (MDA)
Middleweight (−90 kg)	Jevgeņijs Borodavko (LAT)	Artem Bloshenko (UKR)	Henk Grol (NED)
Middleweight (−90 kg)	Jevgeņijs Borodavko (LAT)	Artem Bloshenko (UKR)	Soslan Tmenov (RUS)
Half-heavyweight (−100 kg)	Levan Razmadze (GEO)	Tino Bierau (GER)	Stanislav Makiev (RUS)
Half-heavyweight (−100 kg)	Levan Razmadze (GEO)	Tino Bierau (GER)	Benjamin van Leeuwaarde (NED)
Heavyweight (+100 kg)	Barna Bor (HUN)	Lasha Gujejiani (GEO)	Ivan Iliev (BUL)
Heavyweight (+100 kg)	Barna Bor (HUN)	Lasha Gujejiani (GEO)	Michal Pokrywka (POL)

=== Women's events ===
Event	Gold	Silver	Bronze
Extra-lightweight (−48 kg)	Tatyana Simantov (ISR)	Valentina Moscatt (ITA)	Kitty Bravik (NED)
Extra-lightweight (−48 kg)	Tatyana Simantov (ISR)	Valentina Moscatt (ITA)	Nataliya Kondratyeva (RUS)
Half-lightweight (−52 kg)	Telma Monteiro (POR)	Anna Kharitonova (RUS)	Delphine Delsalle (FRA)
Half-lightweight (−52 kg)	Telma Monteiro (POR)	Anna Kharitonova (RUS)	Ellen Kerssemakers (NED)
Lightweight (−57 kg)	Bernadett Baczkó (HUN)	Corina Căprioriu (ROU)	Nina Koivumäki (FIN)
Lightweight (−57 kg)	Bernadett Baczkó (HUN)	Corina Căprioriu (ROU)	Anicka van Emden (NED)
Half-middleweight (−63 kg)	Margot Wetzer (NED)	Laure Aerts (BEL)	Faith Pitman (GBR)
Half-middleweight (−63 kg)	Margot Wetzer (NED)	Laure Aerts (BEL)	Katarzyna Wrobel (POL)
Middleweight (−70 kg)	Anett Mészáros (HUN)	Katarzyna Kłys (POL)	Hedwig Lechenauer (AUT)
Middleweight (−70 kg)	Anett Mészáros (HUN)	Katarzyna Kłys (POL)	Olesya Ovseichuk (RUS)
Half-heavyweight (−78 kg)	Franziska Konitz (GER)	Mariya Yancheva (BUL)	Flora Mkhitaryan (RUS)
Half-heavyweight (−78 kg)	Franziska Konitz (GER)	Mariya Yancheva (BUL)	Marhinde Verkerk (NED)
Heavyweight (+78 kg)	Denise Jongekrijg (NED)	Gülşah Kocatürk (TUR)	Abbie Cunningham (GBR)
Heavyweight (+78 kg)	Denise Jongekrijg (NED)	Gülşah Kocatürk (TUR)	Janina Waldhausen (GER)

Source Results
