= Bernard Ackah =

German taekwondo practitioner, kickboxer and mixed martial arts fighter

- Born: April 9, 1972 (age 54); Bonn, West Germany
- Other names: The Tragic Comedian
- Nationality: German
- Height: 6 ft 1 in (1.85 m)
- Weight: 205 lb (93 kg; 14.6 st)
- Division: Light Heavyweight (MMA); Heavyweight (kickboxing)
- Reach: 79 in (201 cm)
- Style: Kickboxing, Taekwondo
- Fighting out of: Tokyo, Japan
- Team: X-Force; Freelance
- Rank: Black belt in taekwondo Black belt in judo
- Years active: 2007–present

Kickboxing record
- Total: 6
- Wins: 2
- Losses: 4
- By knockout: 3

Mixed martial arts record
- Total: 11
- Wins: 5
- By knockout: 4
- By decision: 1
- Losses: 6
- By knockout: 3
- By submission: 2
- By decision: 1

Other information
- Mixed martial arts record from Sherdog

Bernard Ackah (born April 9, 1972) is a German taekwondo practitioner, kickboxer, mixed martial artist and comedian.

== Biography ==
=== Martial arts career and background ===
Ackah was born in Bonn, Germany to Ivorian parents and moved to Japan at the age of 2. He practiced judo during his middle school and high school days. In 1998, he went to South Korea and stayed there for 3 years to practice taekwondo at the prestigious Yonsei University.

He made his professional mixed martial arts debut in March 2007 with a first-round knockout victory over Hyun Pyo Shin at K-1 Hero's 8. He entered the spotlight later that year at Dynamite!! USA when he also knocked out former NFL player-turned-mixed martial artist Johnnie Morton. He then went on to lose his next three fights, however, including one to Dutch kickboxer Melvin Manhoef. He ended this losing streak seven seconds into his fight with Ryūshi Yanagisawa at Deep: 43rd Impact with a KO victory. He has since won two fights, both in the Deep promotion.

He entered kickboxing in December 2007 when he faced Japanese legend Musashi at K-1 PREMIUM 2007 Dynamite!!. He lost the fight via knockout in the third round. He also fought at K-1 World Grand Prix 2008 in Fukuoka and took on Tsuyoshi Nakasako, who defeated him via decision. His kickboxing record stands at two wins and three losses.

=== Television career ===
In 2001, he formed the comedy duo "Sio-Koshō" (Solt Pepper) with Rex Jones, which was active until 2008.

He is known to anime fans as the voice of the Master of Ceremonies in the original Japanese version of Yu-Gi-Oh! 5D's. He also made an appearance on the 19th Sasuke competition and failed the "Jumping Spider" in the First Stage. He recently made in appearance in Kamen Rider series, starting Kamen Rider Wizard as the Phantom Caitsith and Kamen Rider Drive as the Gunman Roidmude.

=== Professional wrestling career ===
On November 30, 2014, Ackah made his professional wrestling debut for the Dramatic Dream Team (DDT) promotion, where he was introduced as Ironman Heavymetalweight Champion LiLiCo's bodyguard. He wrestled his first match on December 13, defeating Kazuki Hirata.

== Personal life ==
He can speak English, French, German, Korean, and Japanese.

He is married to a Japanese woman, living in his wife's parents' house, and has 3 children.

== Mixed martial arts record ==
Professional record breakdown
11 matches	5 wins	6 losses
By knockout	4	3
By submission	0	2
By decision	1	1

Res.	Record	Opponent	Method	Event	Date	Round	Time	Location	Notes
Loss	5–6	Yuki Niimura	Submission (rear-naked choke)	Deep: 57 Impact	February 18, 2012	1	3:35	Tokyo, Japan	
Loss	5–5	Shunsuke Inoue	TKO (punches)	Deep: Cage Impact 2011 in Tokyo, 2nd Round	October 29, 2011	1	2:30	Tokyo, Japan	
Loss	5–4	Yoshiyuki Nakanishi	KO (head kick)	Deep: 54 Impact	June 24, 2011	1	1:07	Tokyo, Japan	
Win	5–3	Minoru Kato	Decision (unanimous)	Deep: 47 Impact	April 17, 2010	2	5:00	Tokyo, Japan	
Win	4–3	Shunji Kosaka	TKO (punches)	Deep: Cage Impact 2009	December 19, 2009	1	0:34	Tokyo, Japan	
Win	3–3	Ryushi Yanagisawa	TKO (head kick and punches)	Deep: 43 Impact	August 23, 2009	1	0:07	Tokyo, Japan	
Loss	2–3	Young Choi	Decision (unanimous)	Deep: 42 Impact	June 30, 2009	2	5:00	Tokyo, Japan	
Loss	2–2	Po'ai Suganuma	Submission (armbar)	Hero's 2007 in Korea	October 28, 2007	1	3:05	Seoul, South Korea	
Loss	2–1	Melvin Manhoef	KO (punches)	Hero's 9	July 16, 2007	1	2:13	Yokohama, Japan	
Win	2–0	Johnnie Morton	KO (punch)	Dynamite!! USA	June 2, 2007	1	0:38	Los Angeles, California, United States	Catchweight (213 lbs) bout. Morton tested positive for elevated testosterone levels.
Win	1–0	Hyun Pyo Shin	TKO (punches)	Hero's 8	March 12, 2007	1	1:11	Nagoya, Japan	

=== Kickboxing ===
2 Wins (0 (T) KO's, 2 decision), 4 Losses
Date	Result	Record	Opponent	Event	Method	Round	Time	Location
September 23, 2011	Loss	2-4	Raoumaru	RISEN 83	KO	3		Tokyo, Japan
April 3, 2009	Win	2-3	Keigo Takamori	Shoot Boxing End Road: Takeshi 2009-Bushido	Decision	3	3:00	Japan
August 16, 2008	Loss	1-3	Keigo Takamori	Korean Friendship International Martial Arts Tournament - K-1 Rules GLADIATOR	KO (Left Hook)	1	1:36	Japan
June 29, 2008	Loss	1-2	Tsuyoshi Nakasako	K-1 World Grand Prix 2008 in Fukuoka	Decision	3	3:00	Fukuoka, Japan
April 26, 2008	Win	1-1	Keiiti Nishiwaki	All Japan Kickboxing Federation: Spring Storm	Decision	3	3:00	Japan
December 31, 2007	Loss	0-1	Musashi	K-1 PREMIUM 2007 Dynamite!!	KO (Left Hook)	3	1:26	Osaka, Japan
