= 2003 European Junior Judo Championships =

Judo competition

Judo 2003 European Junior Judo Championships
- Location: Sarajevo, Bosnia and Herzegovina
- Dates: 21–23 November 2003

Competition at external databases
- Links: JudoInside

The 2003 European Junior Judo Championships is an edition of the European Junior Judo Championships, organised by the International Judo Federation. It was held in Sarajevo, Bosnia and Herzegovina from 21 to 23 November 2003.

== Medal summary ==
=== Medal table ===
* Host nation (Bosnia and Herzegovina)

Rank	Nation	Gold	Silver	Bronze	Total
1	Netherlands (NED)	2	0	1	3
1	Russia (RUS)	2	0	1	3
3	Hungary (HUN)	1	3	1	5
4	Germany (GER)	1	2	4	7
5	Italy (ITA)	1	2	0	3
6	France (FRA)	1	1	3	5
7	Romania (ROU)	1	1	1	3
8	Belarus (BLR)	1	0	4	5
9	Georgia (GEO)	1	0	2	3
10	Ukraine (UKR)	1	0	1	2
11	Serbia (SRB)	1	0	0	1
11	Slovenia (SLO)	1	0	0	1
13	Israel (ISR)	0	1	2	3
13	Poland (POL)	0	1	2	3
15	Czech Republic (CZE)	0	1	1	2
16	Finland (FIN)	0	1	0	1
16	Latvia (LAT)	0	1	0	1
18	Portugal (POR)	0	0	2	2
18	Spain (ESP)	0	0	2	2
20	Belgium (BEL)	0	0	1	1
Totals (20 entries)		14	14	28	56

=== Men's events ===
Event	Gold	Silver	Bronze
Extra-lightweight (−60 kg)	Fanil Galimov (RUS)	David Dubsky (CZE)	Maksim Jamilashvili (BLR)
Extra-lightweight (−60 kg)	Fanil Galimov (RUS)	David Dubsky (CZE)	Eyal Yehiel (ISR)
Half-lightweight (−66 kg)	Dex Elmont (NED)	Marco Maddaloni (ITA)	Costel Danculea (ROU)
Half-lightweight (−66 kg)	Dex Elmont (NED)	Marco Maddaloni (ITA)	Namig Sultanov (BLR)
Lightweight (−73 kg)	Srđan Mrvaljević (SRB)	Rinalds Buskovs (LAT)	Abderrahim Alaoui (FRA)
Lightweight (−73 kg)	Srđan Mrvaljević (SRB)	Rinalds Buskovs (LAT)	Przemyslaw Szymajda (POL)
Half-middleweight (−81 kg)	Henk Grol (NED)	Nick Hein (GER)	Vincent Massimino (FRA)
Half-middleweight (−81 kg)	Henk Grol (NED)	Nick Hein (GER)	Grigol Shinjikashvili (GEO)
Middleweight (−90 kg)	Gergö Rajcsányi (HUN)	Samuel Mäki (FIN)	Abakar Aigumov (RUS)
Middleweight (−90 kg)	Gergö Rajcsányi (HUN)	Samuel Mäki (FIN)	Rafal Przytula (NED)
Half-heavyweight (−100 kg)	Askhab Kostoev (RUS)	Rostislav Lis (ISR)	Levan Razmadze (GEO)
Half-heavyweight (−100 kg)	Askhab Kostoev (RUS)	Rostislav Lis (ISR)	Yuriy Snegovskoy (BLR)
Heavyweight (+100 kg)	Lasha Gujejiani (GEO)	Barna Bor (HUN)	Olexiy Danilov (UKR)
Heavyweight (+100 kg)	Lasha Gujejiani (GEO)	Barna Bor (HUN)	Nico Kanning (GER)

=== Women's events ===
Event	Gold	Silver	Bronze
Extra-lightweight (−48 kg)	Carmen Bogdan (ROU)	Amel Bensemain (FRA)	Michaela Baschin (GER)
Extra-lightweight (−48 kg)	Carmen Bogdan (ROU)	Amel Bensemain (FRA)	Sabela Delgado (ESP)
Half-lightweight (−52 kg)	Rosalba Forciniti (ITA)	Mareen Kräh (GER)	Michal Feinblat (ISR)
Half-lightweight (−52 kg)	Rosalba Forciniti (ITA)	Mareen Kräh (GER)	Telma Monteiro (POR)
Lightweight (−57 kg)	Anja Wagner (GER)	Bernadett Baczkó (HUN)	Romana Kasperkiewicz (POL)
Lightweight (−57 kg)	Anja Wagner (GER)	Bernadett Baczkó (HUN)	Katrien Ongena (BEL)
Half-middleweight (−63 kg)	Emmanuelle Payet (FRA)	Marianna Marinosci (ITA)	Ana Cachola (POR)
Half-middleweight (−63 kg)	Emmanuelle Payet (FRA)	Marianna Marinosci (ITA)	Brigitta Szabó (HUN)
Middleweight (−70 kg)	Sviatlana Tsimashenka (BLR)	Anett Mészáros (HUN)	Manja Keller (GER)
Middleweight (−70 kg)	Sviatlana Tsimashenka (BLR)	Anett Mészáros (HUN)	Audrey Law Wai (FRA)
Half-heavyweight (−78 kg)	Mariya Semenyuk (UKR)	Alina Croitoru (ROU)	Alena Eiglova (CZE)
Half-heavyweight (−78 kg)	Mariya Semenyuk (UKR)	Alina Croitoru (ROU)	Marta Tort (ESP)
Heavyweight (+78 kg)	Lucija Polavder (SLO)	Urszula Sadkowska (POL)	Yuliya Barysik (BLR)
Heavyweight (+78 kg)	Lucija Polavder (SLO)	Urszula Sadkowska (POL)	Katrin Dittrich (GER)

Source Results
