= Romy Tarangul =

German judoka (born 1987)

Personal information
- Born: 19 October 1987 (age 38) Frankfurt, East Germany
- Occupation: Judoka

Sport
- Country: Germany
- Sport: Judo
- Weight class: ‍–‍52 kg

Achievements and titles
- Olympic Games: 9th (2008)
- World Champ.: (bronze) (2009)
- European Champ.: (silver) (2008)
Medal record
Women's judo
Representing Germany
World Championships
| Bronze medal – third place | 2009 Rotterdam | ‍–‍52 kg |
| Bronze medal – third place | 2014 Chelyabinsk | Women's team |
European Championships
| Silver medal – second place | 2008 Lisbon | ‍–‍52 kg |
| Bronze medal – third place | 2012 Chelyabinsk | ‍–‍52 kg |
IJF Grand Slam
| Bronze medal – third place | 2009 Moscow | ‍–‍52 kg |
| Bronze medal – third place | 2010 Rio de Janeiro | ‍–‍52 kg |
IJF Grand Prix
| Silver medal – second place | 2013 Qingdao | ‍–‍52 kg |
| Bronze medal – third place | 2009 Tunis | ‍–‍52 kg |
| Bronze medal – third place | 2014 Samsun | ‍–‍52 kg |
Summer Universiade
| Bronze medal – third place | 2013 Kazan | ‍–‍52 kg |

Profile at external databases
- IJF: 534
- JudoInside.com: 22805
- Updated on 31 August 2023

Romy Tarangul (born 19 October 1987 in Frankfurt (Oder), East Germany) is a German judoka. She competed in the ‍–‍52 kg category for the JC 90 Frankfurt (Oder).

In 2008, Tarangul won the silver medal at the European Championships. With this result Tarangul qualified for the Beijing Olympics, where she reached a 9th place overall in the women's 52 kg event. After winning her first bout against Uzbek Sinura Djuraeva she lost narrowly to Misato Nakamura of Japan in the round of 16 and then to Ilse Heylen of Belgium in the repechage round.

Tarangul posed nude in the German edition of Playboy in August 2008, alongside compatriots Nicole Reinhardt, Katharina Scholz and Petra Niemann.

At the 2009 World Judo Championships Tarangul won a bronze medal in her category, marking her biggest international success so far.

At the 2012 Summer Olympics in London Tarangul won her first round fight against Natalia Kuziutina. She was eliminated in the quarterfinals after being defeated by Rosalba Forciniti of Italy who later won the bronze medal.

Tarangul married in 2016.
