= Kristie-Anne Ryder =

Australian Olympic judoka

Personal information
- Nationality: Australia
- Born: 9 March 1990 (age 36) Brisbane, Queensland, Australia
- Height: 1.62 m (5 ft 4 in)
- Weight: 52 kg (115 lb)

Sport
- Sport: Judo
- Event: 52 kg
- Club: Zillmere PCYC
- Coached by: Patrick Mahon

Kristie-Anne Ryder (born 9 March 1990 in Brisbane, Queensland) is an Australian judoka, who played for the half-lightweight category. She is a multiple-time Australian junior champion, and a member of the judo team for Zillmere Police Citizens Youth Club (PCYC), under her personal coach Patrick Mahon.

Ryder represented Australia at the 2008 Summer Olympics in Beijing, where she competed for the women's half-lightweight class (52 kg). She received a bye for the second preliminary round match, before losing out to Belgian judoka and Olympic bronze medalist Ilse Heylen, by an ippon (full point), and a deashi harai (advanced foot sweep), at one minute and thirteen seconds.
