= 2014 World Judo Championships – Women's team =

Judo Women's team at the 2014 World Judo Championships
- Venue: Traktor Ice Arena
- Location: Chelyabinsk, Russia
- Date: 31 August
- Competitors: 80 from 16 nations
- Total prize money: 50,000$

Medalists
gold medal	France (3rd title)
silver medal	Mongolia
bronze medal	Japan
bronze medal	Germany

Competition at external databases
- Links: IJF • EJU • JudoInside

The women's team competition of the 2014 World Judo Championships was held in five weight classes (52 kg — +70 kg), on 31 August.

== Medalists ==
Gold	Silver	Bronze
France; Clarisse Agbegnenou (–63 kg); Emilie Andeol (+70 kg); Anne-Laure Bellard (–63 kg); Laetitia Blot (–57 kg); Annabelle Euranie (–52 kg); Priscilla Gneto (–52 kg); Automne Pavia (–57 kg); Margaux Pinot (–70 kg); Fanny Posvite (–70 kg); Audrey Tcheuméo (+70 kg)	Mongolia; Adiyasambuugiin Tsolmon (–52 kg); Baldorjyn Möngönchimeg (–63 kg); Battulgyn Mönkhtuya (+70 kg); Dorjsürengiin Sumiyaa (–57 kg); Mönkhbaataryn Bundmaa (–52 kg); Mönkhbatyn Urantsetseg (–57 kg); Tsend-Ayuushiin Naranjargal (–70 kg); Tsend-Ayuushiin Tserennadmid (–63 kg)	Japan; Yuki Hashimoto (–52 kg); Kaori Matsumoto (–57 kg); Karen Nun Ira (–70 kg); Ai Shishime (–52 kg); Haruka Tachimoto (–70 kg); Megumi Tachimoto (+70 kg); Miku Tashiro (–63 kg); Nae Udaka (–57 kg); Kanae Yamabe (+70 kg)
France; Clarisse Agbegnenou (–63 kg); Emilie Andeol (+70 kg); Anne-Laure Bellard (–63 kg); Laetitia Blot (–57 kg); Annabelle Euranie (–52 kg); Priscilla Gneto (–52 kg); Automne Pavia (–57 kg); Margaux Pinot (–70 kg); Fanny Posvite (–70 kg); Audrey Tcheuméo (+70 kg)	Mongolia; Adiyasambuugiin Tsolmon (–52 kg); Baldorjyn Möngönchimeg (–63 kg); Battulgyn Mönkhtuya (+70 kg); Dorjsürengiin Sumiyaa (–57 kg); Mönkhbaataryn Bundmaa (–52 kg); Mönkhbatyn Urantsetseg (–57 kg); Tsend-Ayuushiin Naranjargal (–70 kg); Tsend-Ayuushiin Tserennadmid (–63 kg)	Germany; Mareen Kräh (–52 kg); Jasmin Külbs (+70 kg); Luise Malzahn (+70 kg); Iljana Marzok (–70 kg); Miryam Roper (–57 kg); Romy Tarangul (–52 kg); Martyna Trajdos (–63 kg); Laura Vargas Koch (–70 kg)

== Results ==
First Round
Japan	4
North Korea	1
Germany	5
Algeria	0
France	3
Tunisia	2
South Korea	2
Slovenia	3
Brazil	2
Poland	3
Russia	4
Mexico	1
Cuba	4
China	1
Kazakhstan	1
Mongolia	4

Quarterfinals
Japan	3
Germany	2
France	4
Slovenia	1
Poland	3
Russia	2
Cuba	2
Mongolia	3

Semifinals
Japan	2
France	3
Poland	2
Mongolia	3

Final
France	3
Mongolia	2

=== Repechage ===
Repechage		Third place
Germany	3
Slovenia	2	Germany	3
		Poland	2

Repechage		Third place
Russia	4
Cuba	1	Russia	2
		Japan	3

== Prize money ==
The sums listed bring the total prizes awarded to $50,000 for the specific team event.

Medal	Total	Judoka	Coach
Gold	$25,000	$20,000	$5,000
Silver	$15,000	$12,000	$3,000
Bronze	$5,000	$4,000	$1,000
