= Levan Razmadze =

Georgian martial artist

- Born: 14 November 1985 (age 40)
- Other names: Dosukoi (どすこい)
- Nationality: Georgian
- Height: 6 ft 2 in (1.88 m)
- Weight: 275 lb (125 kg; 19 st 9 lb)
- Division: Super Heavyweight
- Style: Judo; Chidaoba
- Team: Freelance; Yoshida Dojo (former)
- Years active: 2007-present

Mixed martial arts record
- Total: 6
- Wins: 5
- By knockout: 2
- By submission: 3
- Losses: 1
- By submission: 1

Other information
- Mixed martial arts record from Sherdog
- Judo career
- Weight class: ‍–‍100 kg

Judo achievements and titles
- European Champ.: R16 (2007)
Medal record
Men's judo
Representing Georgia
European Junior Championships
Gold medal – first place	2004 Sofia	‍–‍100 kg
Bronze medal – third place	2003 Sarajevo	‍–‍100 kg

Profile at external judo databases
- IJF: 6523
- JudoInside.com: 31592

Levan Razmadze (Georgian: ლევან რაზმაძე; born 14 November 1985) is a Georgian judoka and mixed martial artist who competes in the super heavyweight division. Razmadze is a member of the Georgian Olympic Judo team. He is the current DEEP Megaton Champion. He is also widely known in Japan as どすこい羅頭魔勢, the combination of his nickname Dosukoi and an ateji for his family name.

== Judo career ==
Razmadze was active in various levels in Judo competition from 2003 to 2008, winning the 2004 European U20 Championship in Sofia and 2007 Super World Cup in Moscow at Half-heavyweight (-100 kg). He was an alternate for the Republic of Georgia at the 2008 Summer Olympics.

He holds wins over Olympic bronze medalists Dimitri Peters and Movlud Miraliyev, World Championships silver metalists Peter Cousins and Vitaly Bubon, and Pan American gold medalist Mário Sabino.

=== Achievements ===
Year	Tournament	Place	Weight class
2007	Georgian Championships Tbilisi	2nd	Half-heavyweight (-100 kg)
2007	Super World Cup Moscow	1st	Half-heavyweight (-100 kg)
2007	World Cup Warsaw	3rd	Half-heavyweight (-100 kg)
2007	World Cup Tbilisi	2nd	Heavyweight (+100 kg)
2006	World Cup Dutch Open Rotterdam	2nd	Half-heavyweight (-100 kg)
2005	World Cup Tbilisi	3rd	Half-heavyweight (-100 kg)
2004	European U20 Championships Sofia	1st	Half-heavyweight (-100 kg)
2003	European U20 Championships Sarajevo	3rd	Half-heavyweight (-100 kg)

== Mixed martial arts career ==
=== Early career ===
Razmadze made his MMA debut against Hee Seok Song at Gladiator 13 on January 30, 2011, Winning the bout via TKO in the first round.

=== DEEP ===
Razmadze made his DEEP debut against Ryota Ryota at Deep - clubDeep in Diana, Razmadze defeated Ryota via Submission (armbar) in the first round. In his second fight with the DEEP promotion Razmadze faced Seigo Mizuguchi at Deep - 54 Impact and won the bout via TKO (punches) in the first round.

Razmadze faced Kazuhisa Tazawa for the DEEP Megaton Championship at Deep - 55 Impact and won the bout via Submission (keylock) in the first round.

Razmadze faced Ryuta Noji in his first title defense at Deep - 57 Impact and won the bout via Submission (armbar) in the first round. Razmadze later vacated the Deep Megaton Championship. After 3 years on the sidelines Razmadze returned to face Arsen Abdulkerimov at M-1 Challenge 55 - In Memory of Guram Gugenishvili and lost via Submission (armbar) in the first round.

== Championships and accomplishments ==
- DEEP
  - DEEP Megaton Championship (One time)

== Mixed martial arts record ==
Professional record breakdown
6 matches	5 wins	1 loss
By knockout	2	0
By submission	3	1

Res.	Record	Opponent	Method	Event	Date	Round	Time	Location	Notes
Loss	5–1	Arsen Abdulkerimov	Submission (armbar)	M-1 Challenge 55 - In Memory of Guram Gugenishvili	February 21, 2015	1	3:58	Tbilisi, Georgia	
Win	5–0	Ryuta Noji	Submission (armbar)	Deep - 57 Impact	February 18, 2012	1	3:16	Tokyo, Japan	Defended DEEP Megaton Championship
Win	4–0	Kazuhisa Tazawa	Submission (keylock)	Deep: 55 Impact	August 26, 2011	1	1:29	Tokyo, Japan	Won DEEP Megaton Championship
Win	3–0	Seigo Mizuguchi	TKO (punches)	Deep: 54 Impact	June 24, 2011	1	3:21	Tokyo, Japan	
Win	2–0	Ryota Ryota	Submission (armbar)	Deep: clubDeep in Diana	April 24, 2011	1	0:56	Tokyo, Japan	
Win	1–0	Hee Seok Song	TKO (corner stoppage)	Gladiator 13	January 30, 2011	1	4:23	Tokyo, Japan	
