= He Hongmei =

Chinese judoka

Personal information
- Born: 6 December 1983 (age 42)
- Occupation: Judoka

Sport
- Country: China
- Sport: Judo
- Weight class: –52 kg

Achievements and titles
- Olympic Games: R32 (2012)
- World Champ.: 5th (2009)
- Asian Champ.: (gold) (2009)
Medal record
Women's judo
Representing China
Asian Games
Bronze medal – third place	2010 Guangzhou	–52 kg
Asian Championships
Gold medal – first place	2009 Taipei	–52 kg
Bronze medal – third place	2012 Tashkent	–52 kg
IJF Grand Slam
Bronze medal – third place	2010 Rio de Janeiro	–52 kg
IJF Grand Prix
Gold medal – first place	2009 Qingdao	–52 kg
Silver medal – second place	2009 Hamburg	–52 kg
Silver medal – second place	2011 Abu Dhabi	–52 kg
Bronze medal – third place	2011 Düsseldorf	–52 kg

Profile at external databases
- IJF: 33
- JudoInside.com: 39943
- Updated on 28 November 2022

He Hongmei is a Chinese judoka who competes in the women's 52 kg category. She was defeated in the first round of the 2012 Summer Olympics.
