= Misato Nakamura =

Japanese judoka (born 1989)

Personal information
- Native name: 中村美里; Nakamura Misato
- Born: 28 April 1989 (age 37) Hachiōji, Tokyo, Japan
- Occupation: Judoka

Sport
- Country: Japan
- Sport: Judo
- Weight class: –52 kg

Achievements and titles
- Olympic Games: (bronze) (2008, 2016)
- World Champ.: (gold) (2009, 2011, 2015)
- Asian Champ.: (gold) (2010, 2014)
Medal record
Women's judo
Representing Japan
Olympic Games
Bronze medal – third place	2008 Beijing	‍–‍52 kg
Bronze medal – third place	2016 Rio de Janeiro	‍–‍52 kg
World Championships
Gold medal – first place	2009 Rotterdam	‍–‍52 kg
Gold medal – first place	2011 Paris	‍–‍52 kg
Gold medal – first place	2015 Astana	‍–‍52 kg
Silver medal – second place	2010 Tokyo	‍–‍52 kg
Asian Games
Gold medal – first place	2010 Guangzhou	‍–‍52 kg
Gold medal – first place	2014 Incheon	‍–‍52 kg
Gold medal – first place	2014 Incheon	Women's team
Bronze medal – third place	2006 Doha	‍–‍48 kg
World Masters
Gold medal – first place	2010 Suwon	‍–‍52 kg
Gold medal – first place	2011 Baku	‍–‍52 kg
Gold medal – first place	2016 Guadalajara	‍–‍52 kg
Silver medal – second place	2012 Almaty	‍–‍52 kg
IJF Grand Slam
Gold medal – first place	2009 Moscow	‍–‍52 kg
Gold medal – first place	2009 Tokyo	‍–‍52 kg
Gold medal – first place	2010 Paris	‍–‍52 kg
Gold medal – first place	2010 Rio de Janeiro	‍–‍52 kg
Gold medal – first place	2014 Tyumen	‍–‍52 kg
Gold medal – first place	2015 Tokyo	‍–‍52 kg
Silver medal – second place	2008 Tokyo	‍–‍52 kg
Bronze medal – third place	2009 Paris	‍–‍52 kg
Bronze medal – third place	2014 Tokyo	‍–‍52 kg
IJF Grand Prix
Gold medal – first place	2009 Hamburg	‍–‍52 kg
Silver medal – second place	2015 Düsseldorf	‍–‍52 kg
Asian Junior Championships
Gold medal – first place	2003 Macau	‍–‍45 kg
Gold medal – first place	2005 Beirut	‍–‍48 kg

Profile at external databases
- IJF: 80
- JudoInside.com: 40336
- Updated on 24 May 2023

Misato Nakamura (中村 美里, Nakamura Misato; born 28 April 1989) is a Japanese judoka. She won the bronze medal in the -52 kg weight class at the 2008 Summer Olympics and 2016 Summer Olympics and the gold medal in the same weight class at the 2009 World Judo Championships, the 2011 World Judo Championships and 2015 World Judo Championships.

Nakamura began working as a television commentator for judo in 2018.
