= Mönkhbaataryn Bundmaa =

Mongolian judoka (born 1985)

Personal information
- Born: 4 September 1985 (age 40) Uvurkhangai, Mongolia
- Occupation: Judoka
- Height: 1.58 m (5 ft 2 in)

Sport
- Country: Mongolia
- Sport: Judo, Sambo
- Weight class: ‍–‍52 kg

Achievements and titles
- Olympic Games: R16 (2012)
- World Champ.: (bronze) (2010)
- Asian Champ.: (silver) (2006, 2008, 2009, 2010, 2011, 2012, 2015)
Medal record
Women's judo
Representing Mongolia
World Championships
Silver medal – second place	2014 Chelyabinsk	Women's team
Bronze medal – third place	2007 Beijing	Women's team
Bronze medal – third place	2010 Tokyo	‍–‍52 kg
Asian Games
Silver medal – second place	2006 Doha	‍–‍52 kg
Silver medal – second place	2010 Guangzhou	‍–‍52 kg
Asian Championships
Silver medal – second place	2008 Jeju	‍–‍52 kg
Silver medal – second place	2009 Taipei	‍–‍52 kg
Silver medal – second place	2011 Abu Dhabi	‍–‍52 kg
Silver medal – second place	2012 Tashkent	‍–‍52 kg
Silver medal – second place	2015 Kuwait City	‍–‍52 kg
Bronze medal – third place	2005 Tashkent	‍–‍52 kg
Bronze medal – third place	2016 Tashkent	‍–‍52 kg
World Masters
Bronze medal – third place	2011 Baku	‍–‍52 kg
IJF Grand Slam
Gold medal – first place	2011 Paris	‍–‍52 kg
Gold medal – first place	2011 Moscow	‍–‍52 kg
Silver medal – second place	2012 Paris	‍–‍52 kg
Bronze medal – third place	2016 Baku	‍–‍52 kg
IJF Grand Prix
Gold medal – first place	2011 Qingdao	‍–‍52 kg
Gold medal – first place	2013 Jeju	‍–‍52 kg
Bronze medal – third place	2011 Abu Dhabi	‍–‍52 kg
Bronze medal – third place	2012 Düsseldorf	‍–‍52 kg
Bronze medal – third place	2014 Ulaanbaatar	‍–‍52 kg
Bronze medal – third place	2015 Ulaanbaatar	‍–‍52 kg
East Asian Championships
Bronze medal – third place	2006 Ulaanbaatar	‍–‍52 kg
Summer Universiade
Gold medal – first place	2007 Bangkok	‍–‍52 kg
Women's sambo
World Championships
Gold medal – first place	2007 Prague	‍–‍52 kg
Bronze medal – third place	2006 Sofia	‍–‍52 kg

Profile at external databases
- IJF: 197
- JudoInside.com: 37349
- Updated on 25 July 2023

Mönkhbaataryn Bundmaa (Mongolian: Мөнхбаатарын Бундмаа; born 4 September 1985) is a Mongolian retired judoka. She won the silver medal in the half-lightweight category (52 kg) of the 2006 Asian Games, having lost to An Kum-Ae of North Korea in the final match. Mönkhbaataryn won bronze in the 2010 World Championships held in Tokyo, Japan.

She also competed at the 2008 Summer Olympics and 2012 Summer Olympics.

Mönkhbaataryn was born in Uvurkhangai and resides in Ulaanbaatar.
