= Shih Pei-chun =

Taiwanese judoka (born 1980)

Personal information
- Born: 23 February 1980 (age 46)
- Occupation: Judoka

Sport
- Sport: Judo

Profile at external databases
- JudoInside.com: 10879

Shih Pei-chun (born 23 February 1980) is a Taiwanese judoka who competed in the 2000 Summer Olympics and in the 2008 Summer Olympics.
