= Flor Velázquez =

Venezuelan judoka (born 1984)

Personal information
- Born: May 2, 1984 (age 42)
- Occupation: Judoka

Sport
- Sport: Judo
Medal record
Women's judo
Representing Venezuela
Pan American Games
Bronze medal – third place	2003 Santo Domingo	–52 kg
Bronze medal – third place	2007 Rio de Janeiro	–52 kg
Pan American Championships
Bronze medal – third place	2007 Montreal	–52 kg

Profile at external databases
- JudoInside.com: 18169

Flor Angela Velázquez Artahona (born May 2, 1984) is a female judoka from Venezuela, who won the bronze medal in the women's half lightweight division (– 52 kg) at the 2003 Pan American Games in Santo Domingo, Dominican Republic. She represented her native country in two consecutive Summer Olympics, starting in 2004.
