= An Kum-ae =

North Korean judoka (born 1980)

Personal information
- Born: 3 June 1980 (age 46) Pyongyang, North Korea
- Occupation: Judoka
- Height: 160 cm (5 ft 3 in)

Korean name
- Hangul: 안금애
- Hanja: 安琴愛
- RR: An Geumae
- MR: An Kŭmae

Sport
- Country: North Korea
- Sport: Judo
- Weight class: –52 kg

Achievements and titles
- Olympic Games: (gold) (2012)
- World Champ.: (bronze) (2005, 2007)
- Asian Champ.: (gold) (2005, 2006)
Medal record
Women's judo
Representing North Korea
Olympic Games
Gold medal – first place	2012 London	‍–‍52 kg
Silver medal – second place	2008 Beijing	‍–‍52 kg
World Championships
Bronze medal – third place	2005 Cairo	‍–‍52 kg
Bronze medal – third place	2007 Rio de Janeiro	‍–‍52 kg
Asian Games
Gold medal – first place	2006 Doha	‍–‍52 kg
Bronze medal – third place	2010 Guangzhou	‍–‍52 kg
Asian Championships
Gold medal – first place	2005 Tashkent	‍–‍52 kg
Bronze medal – third place	2004 Almaty	‍–‍52 kg
IJF Grand Prix
Silver medal – second place	2011 Qingdao	‍–‍52 kg
Summer Universiade
Silver medal – second place	2003 Jeju	‍–‍52 kg
Bronze medal – third place	2001 Beijing	‍–‍52 kg

Profile at external databases
- IJF: 4967
- JudoInside.com: 1068
- Updated on 28 May 2023

An Kum-ae (Korean: 안금애; pronounced [an.ɡɯm.ɛ]; born 3 June 1980) is a North Korean judoka.

== Early life ==
According to Choson Sinbo, she was born as the last child of father An Jong Ryon and mother Moon Jung Sik. She learned judo after following her older sister in a judo training center in the Mangyongdae athletics school.

== Awards ==
In the 2012 Summer Olympics, An won the gold medal in the Women's 52 kg Judo competition after defeating Yanet Bermoy of Cuba, having won the silver medal at the 2008 Summer Olympics, losing to Xian Dongmei of China in the gold medal match.

An won a bronze medal in the half-lightweight category (52 kg) at the 2005 World Judo Championships, having defeated Lyudmila Bogdanova of Russia in the bronze medal match. She again won the bronze medal at the 2007 World Judo Championships.

An won the gold medal in the same weight category at the 2006 Asian Games, having defeated Mönkhbaataryn Bundmaa of Mongolia in the final match.
