= Rosalba Forciniti =

Italian judoka (born 1986)

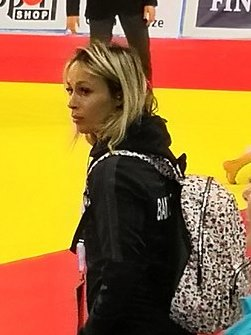

Personal information
- Nationality: Italian
- Born: 13 February 1986 (age 40) Cosenza, Italy
- Occupation: Judoka
- Height: 1.60 m (5 ft 3 in)

Sport
- Country: Italy
- Sport: Judo
- Weight class: –52 kg
- Club: C.S. Carabinieri

Achievements and titles
- Olympic Games: (bronze) (2012)
- World Champ.: R16 (2010)
- European Champ.: (silver) (2010)
Medal record
Women's judo
Representing Italy
Olympic Games
Bronze medal – third place	2012 London	‍–‍52 kg
European Championships
Silver medal – second place	2010 Vienna	‍–‍52 kg
IJF Grand Slam
Silver medal – second place	2011 Rio de Janeiro	‍–‍52 kg
IJF Grand Prix
Silver medal – second place	2014 Tbilisi	‍–‍52 kg
European U23 Championships
Bronze medal – third place	2008 Zagreb	‍–‍52 kg
European Junior Championships
Gold medal – first place	2003 Sarajevo	‍–‍52 kg
Mediterranean Games
Silver medal – second place	2009 Pescara	‍–‍52 kg

Profile at external databases
- IJF: 688
- JudoInside.com: 16568
- Updated on 28 May 2023

Rosalba Forciniti (born 13 February 1986 in Cosenza) is an Italian judoka.

== Biography ==
She won the bronze medal in 52 kg category at the 2012 Summer Olympics, she is the first Calabrian woman ever to reach the podium at the Olympic Games.

== Achievements ==
Year	Competition	Venue	Position	Event	Notes
2012	Olympic Games	(United Kingdom) London	3rd	52 kg	
