= María García (judoka) =

Dominican Republic judoka (born 1987)

Personal information
- Full name: María Altagarcia García Cáceres
- Born: 10 August 1987 (age 38) La Vega
- Occupation: Judoka

Sport
- Country: Dominican Republic
- Sport: Judo
- Weight class: ‍–‍52 kg

Achievements and titles
- Olympic Games: R16 (2008, 2012)
- World Champ.: 13th (2005)
- Pan American Champ.: (2005, 2007)
Medal record
Women's judo
Representing Dominican Republic
Pan American Games
Bronze medal – third place	2007 Rio de Janeiro	‍–‍52 kg
Pan American Championships
Silver medal – second place	2005 Caguas	‍–‍52 kg
Silver medal – second place	2007 Montreal	‍–‍52 kg
Bronze medal – third place	2004 Isla Margarita	‍–‍52 kg
Bronze medal – third place	2008 Miami	‍–‍52 kg
Bronze medal – third place	2012 Montreal	‍–‍52 kg
IJF Grand Slam
Bronze medal – third place	2012 Rio de Janeiro	‍–‍52 kg
World Juniors Championships
Bronze medal – third place	2006 Santo Domingo	‍–‍52 kg
South American Junior Championships
Gold medal – first place	2006 Cali	‍–‍52 kg

Profile at external databases
- IJF: 6014
- JudoInside.com: 43434
- Updated on 27 November 2022

María Altagarcia García Cáceres (born 10 August 1987 in La Vega) is a Dominican Republican judoka who competes in the women's 52 kg category. She became the first Dominican judoka to win a world championship medal, with a bronze at the 2006 Junior Championships.

García has twice competed at an Olympic Games. She was eliminated at the quarterfinal stage at the 2008 Summer Olympics in Beijing and at the 2012 Summer Olympics, she was defeated in the second round. She has won silver medals at the 2014 Central American and Caribbean Games and 2007 Pan American Judo Championships, and bronze at the 2007 Pan American Games, 2010 Central American and Caribbean Games, and three editions of the Pan American Judo Championships.
