= Kim Kyung-ok =

South Korean judoka (born 1983)

Personal information
- Born: 25 March 1983 (age 43)
- Occupation: Judoka

Sport
- Country: South Korea
- Sport: Judo
- Weight class: –52 kg

Achievements and titles
- Olympic Games: 5th (2008)
- World Champ.: 5th (2007)
- Asian Champ.: (gold) (2003)
Medal record
Women's judo
Representing South Korea
Asian Championships
Gold medal – first place	2003 Jeju	–52 kg
Silver medal – second place	2005 Tashkent	–52 kg
Bronze medal – third place	2000 Osaka	–52 kg
Bronze medal – third place	2007 Kuwait City	–52 kg
Bronze medal – third place	2011 Abu Dhabi	–52 kg
IJF Grand Slam
Bronze medal – third place	2009 Paris	–52 kg
World Juniors Championships
Bronze medal – third place	2002 Jeju	–52 kg
Asian Junior Championships
Bronze medal – third place	2001 Hi Chi Minh	–52 kg

Profile at external databases
- IJF: 65
- JudoInside.com: 18537
- Updated on 16 February 2022

Kim Kyung-ok (Korean: 김경옥; born 25 March 1983) is a South Korean judoka who competes in the women's 52 kg category. At the 2008 Summer Olympics, she finished in 5th place. At the 2012 Summer Olympics, she was defeated in the second round by Priscilla Gneto, who then also defeated her in the repechage round.
