= List of flag bearers for Luxembourg at the Olympics =

Luxembourg at the Olympics
- IOC code: LUX
- NOC: Luxembourgish Olympic and Sporting Committee
- Website: www.cosl.lu (in French)
- Medals: Gold 2 Silver 3 Bronze 0 Total 5

Summer appearances
- 1900; 1904–1908; 1912; 1920; 1924; 1928; 1932; 1936; 1948; 1952; 1956; 1960; 1964; 1968; 1972; 1976; 1980; 1984; 1988; 1992; 1996; 2000; 2004; 2008; 2012; 2016; 2020; 2024

Winter appearances
- 1928; 1932; 1936; 1948–1984; 1988; 1992; 1994; 1998; 2002; 2006; 2010; 2014; 2018; 2022; 2026

This is a list of flag bearers who have represented Luxembourg at the Olympics.

Flag bearers carry the national flag of their country at the opening ceremony of the Olympic Games.

#	Event year	Season	Flag bearer	Sport
1	1912	Summer	Jean-Pierre Thommes	Gymnastics
2	1920	Summer	Alex Servais	Athletics
3	1924	Summer	Paul Hammer	Athletics
4	1928	Winter	Willy Heldenstein	Bobsleigh
5	1928	Summer	Georges Schmit	Athletics
6	1936	Summer	Jean Wagner	Athletics
7	1948	Summer	Vic Feller	Football
8	1952	Summer	Camille Wagner	Football
9	1956	Summer	René Kohn	Swimming
10	1964	Summer	Josy Stoffel	Gymnastics
11	1968	Summer	Charles Sowa	Racewalking
12	1972	Summer	Charles Sowa	Racewalking
13	1976	Summer	Robert Schiel	Fencing
14	1984	Summer	Jeannette Goergen-Philip	Archery
15	1988	Winter	Armand Wagener	Official
16	1988	Summer	Roland Jacoby	Shooting
17	1992	Summer	Yves Clausse	Swimming
18	1994	Winter	Georges Diderich	Official
19	1996	Summer	Anne Kremer	Tennis
20	1998	Winter	Patrick Schmit	Figure skating
21	2000	Summer	Lara Heinz	Swimming
22	2004	Summer	Claudine Schaul	Tennis
23	2006	Winter	Fleur Maxwell	Figure skating
24	2008	Summer	Raphaël Stacchiotti	Swimming
25	2012	Summer	Marie Muller	Judo
26	2014	Winter	Kari Peters	Cross-country skiing
27	2016	Summer	Gilles Muller	Tennis
28	2018	Winter	Matthieu Osch	Alpine skiing
29	2020	Summer	Christine Majerus	Cycling
29	2020	Summer	Raphaël Stacchiotti	Swimming
30	2022	Winter	Matthieu Osch	Alpine skiing
30	2022	Winter	Gwyneth Ten Raa	Alpine skiing
31	2024	Summer	Bob Bertemes	Athletics
31	2024	Summer	Ni Xialian	Table tennis

== See also ==
- Luxembourg at the Olympics
