= Luxembourg at the 2016 Summer Paralympics =

- IPC code: LUX
- NPC: Luxembourg Paralympic Committee
- Website: www.paralympics.lu

in Rio de Janeiro
- Competitors: 3 in 2 sports
- Flag bearer: Joel Wagener
- Medals: Gold 0 Silver 0 Bronze 0 Total 0

Summer Paralympics appearances (overview)
- 1976; 1980; 1984; 1988; 1992; 1996; 2000–2004; 2008; 2012–2016; 2020; 2024

Luxembourg competed at the 2016 Summer Paralympics in Rio de Janeiro, Brazil, from 7 September to 18 September 2016. Tom Habscheid earned the best result for the country with a 7th place in men's shot put F42.

== Athletics ==
Men's Field

Athlete	Events	Result	Rank
Tom Habscheid	Shot Put F42	13.28	7

== Cycling ==
=== Road ===
Athlete	Event	Time	Rank
Luciano Fratini	Men's road time trial H3	34:05.77	12
Luciano Fratini	Men's road race H3	1:52:52	10
Joel Wagener	Men's road time trial H4	31:59.40	11
Joel Wagener	Men's road race H4	1:41:11	11

== See also ==
- Luxembourg at the 2016 Summer Olympics
