= Luxembourg at the 1912 Summer Olympics =

- IOC code: LUX
- NOC: Luxembourg Olympic and Sporting Committee

in Stockholm
- Competitors: 21 in 2 sports
- Flag bearer: Jean-Pierre Thommes
- Medals: Gold 0 Silver 0 Bronze 0 Total 0

Summer Olympics appearances (overview)
- 1900; 1904–1908; 1912; 1920; 1924; 1928; 1932; 1936; 1948; 1952; 1956; 1960; 1964; 1968; 1972; 1976; 1980; 1984; 1988; 1992; 1996; 2000; 2004; 2008; 2012; 2016; 2020; 2024

Luxembourg competed at the 1912 Summer Olympics in Stockholm, Sweden. It was the first official appearance at the modern Olympic Games for the nation, although it was later discovered that one Luxembourgish athlete competed in 1900.

== Athletics ==
Two athletes represented Luxembourg in the nation's Olympic debut. Pelletier's 17th-place finish in the shot put was Luxembourg's best placement.

Ranks given are within that athlete's heat for running events.

Athlete	Events	Heat		Semifinal		Final	
Athlete	Events	Result	Rank	Result	Rank	Result	Rank
Paul Fournelle	Long jump	N/A		No mark	30	did not advance	
Marcel Pelletier	Shot put	N/A		11.04	17	did not advance	
Marcel Pelletier	Discus throw	N/A		33.73	33	did not advance	

== Gymnastics ==
all-around

- Antoine Wehrer - 15th, 117.25 points
- Pierre Hentges - 18th, 115.50 points
- Jean-Pierre Thommes - 22nd, 110.75 points
- François Hentges - 23rd, 110.50 points
- Emile Lanners - 24th, 109.75 points

team, European system

fourth place, 35.95 points

- Nicolas Adam
- Charles Behm
- André Bordang
- Michel Hemmerling
- François Hentges
- Pierre Hentges
- Jean-Baptiste Horn
- Nicolas Kanivé
- Nicolas Kummer
- Marcel Langsam
- Emile Lanners
- Jean-Pierre Thommes
- François Wagner
- Antoine Wehrer
- Ferd Wirtz
- Joseph Zuang

team, free system

fifth place, 16.30 points

- Nicolas Adam
- Charles Behm
- André Bordang
- Jean-Pierre Frantzen
- Michel Hemmerling
- François Hentges
- Pierre Hentges
- Jean-Baptiste Horn
- Nicolas Kanivé
- Émile Knepper
- Nicolas Kummer
- Marcel Langsam
- Emile Lanners
- Maurice Palgen
- Jean-Pierre Thommes
- François Wagner
- Antoine Wehrer
- Ferd Wirtz
- Joseph Zuang
