= Luxembourg at the 1956 Summer Olympics =

- IOC code: LUX
- NOC: Luxembourg Olympic and Sporting Committee

in Melbourne/Stockholm
- Competitors: 11 in 5 sports
- Flag bearer: René Kohn
- Medals: Gold 0 Silver 0 Bronze 0 Total 0

Summer Olympics appearances (overview)
- 1900; 1904–1908; 1912; 1920; 1924; 1928; 1932; 1936; 1948; 1952; 1956; 1960; 1964; 1968; 1972; 1976; 1980; 1984; 1988; 1992; 1996; 2000; 2004; 2008; 2012; 2016; 2020; 2024

Luxembourg competed at the 1956 Summer Olympics in Melbourne, Australia. Eleven competitors, ten men and one woman, participated in 22 events across five sports.

== Athletics ==
Men's 800 metres:

- Gerard Rasquin – Round 1, 1:52.7 (4th, did not advance)

== Cycling ==
Individual road race

- Gaston Dumont – did not finish (→ no ranking)

== Fencing ==
Four fencers, all men, represented Luxembourg in 1956.

Men's épée

- Émile Gretsch
- Édouard Schmit
- Jean-Fernand Leischen

Men's team épée

- Émile Gretsch, Jean-Fernand Leischen, Édouard Schmit, Roger Theisen

Men's sabre

- Roger Theisen

== Swimming ==
Men

Athlete	Event	Heat		Final	
Athlete	Event	Time	Rank	Time	Rank
René Kohn	200 m breaststroke	2:50.9	13	Did not advance	
