= Luxembourg at the 1952 Summer Olympics =

- IOC code: LUX
- NOC: Luxembourg Olympic and Sporting Committee

in Helsinki
- Competitors: 44 in 9 sports
- Flag bearer: Camille Wagner
- Medals Ranked 27th: Gold 1 Silver 0 Bronze 0 Total 1

Summer Olympics appearances (overview)
- 1900; 1904–1908; 1912; 1920; 1924; 1928; 1932; 1936; 1948; 1952; 1956; 1960; 1964; 1968; 1972; 1976; 1980; 1984; 1988; 1992; 1996; 2000; 2004; 2008; 2012; 2016; 2020; 2024

Luxembourg competed at the 1952 Summer Olympics in Helsinki, Finland. 44 competitors, all men, took part in 32 events in 9 sports.

== Medalists ==
=== Gold ===
- Josy Barthel — Athletics, Men's 1.500 metres

== Athletics ==
Seven athletes, all male, represented Luxembourg in 1952.

Men's 200 metres

- Fred Hammer
- Roby Schaeffer

Men's 400 metres

- Fred Hammer
- Jean Hamilius
- Gérard Rasquin

Men's 1500 metres

- Josy Barthel

Men's 5000 metres

- Paul Frieden

Men's 110 metres hurdles

- Johny Fonck

Men's 400 metres hurdles

- Johny Fonck

Men's 4 x 400 metres relay

- Fred Hammer
- Jean Hamilius
- Gérard Rasquin
- Roby Schaeffer

== Boxing ==
Men's Light-Welterweight:

- Fernand Backes

- Second Round — Lost to Jean Louis Paternotte of Belgium (0 - 3)

Men's Welterweight:

- Jeannot Welter

- First Round — Lost to Franco Vescovi of Italy (0 - 2)

Men's Light-Middleweight:

- Bruno Matiussi

- First Round — Lost to Guido Mazzinghi of Italy (0 - 3)

Men's Middleweight:

- Alfred Stuermer

- First Round — Lost to Boris Georgiev Nikolov of Bulgaria (0 - 3)

== Cycling ==
Road Competition

Men's Individual Road Race (190.4 km)

- André Moes — 5:11:19.0 (→ 11th place)
- Roger Ludwig — 5:11:20.0 (→ 14th place)
- Josef Schraner — 5:15:06.1 (→ 20th place)
- Nicolas Morn — 5:26:25.0 (→ 51st place)
- Jean Schmit — did not finish (→ no ranking)

== Fencing ==
Four fencers, all male, represented Luxembourg in 1952.

Men's épée

- Léon Buck
- Émile Gretsch
- Jean-Fernand Leischen

Men's team épée

- Émile Gretsch
- Jean-Fernand Leischen
- Paul Anen
- Léon Buck

== Swimming ==
Men

Rank given is within the heat.

Athlete	Event	Heat		Semifinal		Final	
Athlete	Event	Time	Rank	Time	Rank	Time	Rank
René Kohn	200 m breaststroke	2:59.3	6	Did not advance			
