= Luxembourg at the 1960 Summer Olympics =

- IOC code: LUX
- NOC: Luxembourg Olympic and Sporting Committee

in Rome
- Competitors: 52 in 10 sports
- Medals: Gold 0 Silver 0 Bronze 0 Total 0

Summer Olympics appearances (overview)
- ~~1900~~; 1904–1908; 1912; 1920; 1924; 1928; 1932; 1936; 1948; 1952; 1956; 1960; 1964; 1968; 1972; 1976; 1980; 1984; 1988; 1992; 1996; 2000; 2004; 2008; 2012; 2016; 2020; 2024; 2028

Luxembourg competed at the 1960 Summer Olympics in Rome, Italy. 52 competitors, 47 men and 5 women, took part in 48 events in 10 sports.

== Cycling ==
Six cyclists represented Luxembourg in 1960.

Individual road race

- Roby Hentges
- René Andring
- Roger Thull
- Louis Grisius

Team time trial

- Nico Pleimling
- René Andring
- Louis Grisius
- Raymond Bley

== Fencing ==
Ten fencers, eight men and two women, represented Luxembourg in 1960.

Men's foil

- Jean Link
- Édouard Didier
- Robert Schiel

Men's team foil

- Jean Link, Robert Schiel, Édouard Didier, Roger Theisen, Jean-Paul Olinger

Men's épée

- Eddi Gutenkauf
- Robert Schiel
- Roger Theisen

Men's team épée

- Roger Theisen, Edy Schmit, Robert Schiel, Rudy Kugeler, Eddi Gutenkauf

Women's foil

- Colette Flesch
- Ginette Rossini

== Shooting ==
Four shooters represented Luxembourg in 1960.

50 m pistol

- François Fug

50 m rifle, three positions

- Victor Kremer

50 m rifle, prone

- Victor Kremer

Trap

- Marcel Chennaux
- Aly Knepper

== Swimming ==
Men

Athlete	Event	Heat		Semifinal		Final	
Athlete	Event	Time	Rank	Time	Rank	Time	Rank
René Wagner	100 m freestyle	1:04.3	49	Did not advance			
Rudy Muller	100 m backstroke	1:12.3	34	Did not advance			
Erny Schweitzer	200 m breaststroke	DSQ		Did not advance			

Women

Athlete	Event	Heat		Final	
Athlete	Event	Time	Rank	Time	Rank
Simone Theis	100 m backstroke	1:23.9	30	Did not advance	
