= Luxembourg at the 1948 Summer Olympics =

- IOC code: LUX
- NOC: Luxembourg Olympic and Sporting Committee

in London
- Competitors: 45 in 8 sports
- Flag bearer: Vic Feller
- Medals: Gold 0 Silver 0 Bronze 0 Total 0

Summer Olympics appearances (overview)
- 1900; 1904–1908; 1912; 1920; 1924; 1928; 1932; 1936; 1948; 1952; 1956; 1960; 1964; 1968; 1972; 1976; 1980; 1984; 1988; 1992; 1996; 2000; 2004; 2008; 2012; 2016; 2020; 2024

Luxembourg competed at the 1948 Summer Olympics in London, England. 45 competitors, 42 men and 3 women, took part in 32 events in 8 sports.

== Cycling ==
Four cyclists, all men, represented Luxembourg in 1948.

Individual road race

- Robert Bintz
- Marcel Ernzer
- Henri Kellen
- Pitty Scheer

Team road race

- Robert Bintz
- Marcel Ernzer
- Henri Kellen
- Pitty Scheer

== Fencing ==
Six fencers, all men, represented Luxembourg in 1948.

Men's foil

- Émile Gretsch
- Léon Buck
- Gust Lamesch

Men's épée

- Émile Gretsch
- Paul Anen
- Jean-Fernand Leischen

Men's team épée

- Jean-Fernand Leischen, Paul Anen, Émile Gretsch, Gust Lamesch, Erny Putz
