= Luxembourg at the 1972 Summer Olympics =

- IOC code: LUX
- NOC: Luxembourg Olympic and Sporting Committee

in Munich
- Competitors: 11 in 5 sports
- Flag bearer: Charles Sowa
- Medals: Gold 0 Silver 0 Bronze 0 Total 0

Summer Olympics appearances (overview)
- 1900; 1904–1908; 1912; 1920; 1924; 1928; 1932; 1936; 1948; 1952; 1956; 1960; 1964; 1968; 1972; 1976; 1980; 1984; 1988; 1992; 1996; 2000; 2004; 2008; 2012; 2016; 2020; 2024

Luxembourg competed at the 1972 Summer Olympics in Munich, West Germany. 11 competitors, 10 men and 1 woman, took part in 8 events in 5 sports.

== Archery ==
In the first modern archery competition at the Olympics, Luxembourg entered one man and one woman. Their highest placing competitor was Nelly Wies-Weyrich, at 24th place in the women's competition.

Men

Athlete	Event	Round 1		Round 2		Total score	
Athlete	Event	Score	Seed	Score	Seed	Score	Seed
Marcel Balthasar	Individual	1144	36	1141	43	2285	39

Women

Athlete	Event	Round 1		Round 2		Total score	
Athlete	Event	Score	Seed	Score	Seed	Score	Seed
Nelly Wies-Weyrich	Individual	1144	23	1108	33	2252	24

== Athletics ==
Men
Track and road events

Athletes	Events	Final	
Athletes	Events	Time	Rank
Charles Sowa	20 km walk	1:36:23.8	18
Charles Sowa	50 km walk	4:14:21.2	10

== Cycling ==
Two cyclists represented Luxembourg in 1972.

Men

Athletes	Events	Final	
Athletes	Events	Time	Rank
Lucien Didier	Individual road race	4:17:13.0	56
Erny Kirchen	Individual road race	4:15:21.0	27

== Fencing ==
Five fencers, all men, represented Luxembourg in 1972.

=== Men ===
Athlete	Event	Round 1		Round 2		Quarterfinal		Semifinal		Final	
Athlete	Event	Opposition Result	Rank	Opposition Result	Rank	Opposition Result	Rank	Opposition Result	Rank	Opposition Result	Rank
Alain Anen	Men's épée		6	did not advance							68
Remo Manelli	Men's épée		6	did not advance							64
Robert Schiel	Men's épée		2 Q		3 Q		4	did not advance			16
Alain Anen; Aly Doerfel; Romain Manelli; Remo Manelli; Robert Schiel	Team épée	Poland; L 6–9; Mexico; Switzerland; L 4–12	3	did not advance							11

== Shooting ==
One male shooter represented Luxembourg in 1972.

Open

Athlete	Event	Final	
Athlete	Event	Score	Rank
Michel Braun	25 m rapid fire pistol	577	38

== Water skiing (demonstration sports) ==
Women

Athlete	Event	Final	
Athlete	Event	Score	Rank
Sylvie Hülsemann	Women's figure skiing	1780	4
