= Luxembourg at the 1928 Summer Olympics =

- IOC code: LUX
- NOC: Luxembourg Olympic and Sporting Committee

in Amsterdam
- Competitors: 48 (46 men and 2 women) in 10 sports
- Flag bearer: George Schmit
- Medals: Gold 0 Silver 0 Bronze 0 Total 0

Summer Olympics appearances (overview)
- ~~1900~~; 1904–1908; 1912; 1920; 1924; 1928; 1932; 1936; 1948; 1952; 1956; 1960; 1964; 1968; 1972; 1976; 1980; 1984; 1988; 1992; 1996; 2000; 2004; 2008; 2012; 2016; 2020; 2024; 2028

Luxembourg competed at the 1928 Summer Olympics in Amsterdam, Netherlands. 48 competitors, 46 men and 2 women, took part in 31 events in 10 sports.

== Boxing ==
Men's Flyweight (– 50.8 kg)

- Jean Kieffer

- First Round – Lost to Alfredo Gaona (MEX), points

== Cycling ==
Four cyclists represented Luxembourg in 1928.

Individual road race

- Jean-Pierre Muller
- Norbert Sinner
- Jean Alfonsetti
- Marcel Pesch

Team pursuit

- Jean-Pierre Muller
- Norbert Sinner
- Jean Alfonsetti

== Swimming ==
Men

| Athlete | Event | Heat | | Semifinal | | Final | |
| Athlete | Event | Time | Rank | Time | Rank | Time | Rank |
|---|---|---|---|---|---|---|---|
| Eugène Kuborn | 100 m backstroke | Unknown | | Did not advance | | | |

Women

| Athlete | Event | Heat | | Semifinal | | Final | |
| Athlete | Event | Time | Rank | Time | Rank | Time | Rank |
|---|---|---|---|---|---|---|---|
| Marie-Jeanne Bernard | 100 m backstroke | Unknown | | —N/a | | Did not advance | |
| Virginie Rausch | 200 m breaststroke | Unknown | | Did not advance | | | |
