= Luxembourg at the 1988 Summer Olympics =

- IOC code: LUX
- NOC: Luxembourg Olympic and Sporting Committee

in Seoul
- Competitors: 8 in 4 sports
- Flag bearer: Roland Jacoby
- Medals: Gold 0 Silver 0 Bronze 0 Total 0

Summer Olympics appearances (overview)
- 1900; 1904–1908; 1912; 1920; 1924; 1928; 1932; 1936; 1948; 1952; 1956; 1960; 1964; 1968; 1972; 1976; 1980; 1984; 1988; 1992; 1996; 2000; 2004; 2008; 2012; 2016; 2020; 2024

Luxembourg competed at the 1988 Summer Olympics in Seoul, South Korea.

== Competitors ==
The following is the list of number of competitors in the Games.

Sport	Men	Women	Total
Archery	0	1	1
Athletics	2	1	3
Shooting	2	0	2
Swimming	1	1	2
Total	5	3	8

== Results by event ==
=== Archery ===
In its fourth appearance in Olympic archery, Luxembourg was represented by one woman.

Women's Individual Competition:

Athlete	Event	Ranking round		Round of 64	Round of 32	Round of 16	Quarterfinals	Semifinals	Final / BM	
Athlete	Event	Score	Seed	Opposition Score	Opposition Score	Opposition Score	Opposition Score	Opposition Score	Opposition Score	Rank
Ilse Martha Ries-Hotz	Women's Individual	1187	48	Did not advance						

=== Athletics ===
Men's Marathon

Athlete	Event	Final	
Athlete	Event	Result	Rank
Justin Gloden	Marathon	2:22.14	36

Men's 20 km Walk

Athlete	Event	Final	
Athlete	Event	Result	Rank
Marc Sowa	20km Walk	DQ	

Women's Marathon

Athlete	Event	Final	
Athlete	Event	Result	Rank
Danièle Kaber	Marathon	2:29.23	7

=== Swimming ===
Men's 50m Freestyle

Athlete	Event	Heat		Semifinal		Final	
Athlete	Event	Time	Rank	Time	Rank	Time	Rank
Yves Clausse	50m Freestyle	23.99	28	Did not advance			

Men's 100m Freestyle

Athlete	Event	Heat		Semifinal		Final	
Athlete	Event	Time	Rank	Time	Rank	Time	Rank
Yves Clausse	100m Freestyle	52.27	35	Did not advance			

Men's 200m Freestyle

Athlete	Event	Heat		Semifinal		Final	
Athlete	Event	Time	Rank	Time	Rank	Time	Rank
Yves Clausse	200m Freestyle	1:45.90	38	Did not advance			

Women's 100m Breaststroke

Athlete	Event	Heat		Semifinal		Final	
Athlete	Event	Time	Rank	Time	Rank	Time	Rank
Nancy Arendt	100m Freestyle	1:14.99	29	Did not advance			

Women's 200m Breaststroke

Athlete	Event	Heat		Semifinal		Final	
Athlete	Event	Time	Rank	Time	Rank	Time	Rank
Nancy Arendt	200m Freestyle	DQ		Did not advance			
