= Luxembourg at the 1992 Summer Olympics =

- IOC code: LUX
- NOC: Luxembourg Olympic and Sporting Committee

in Barcelona
- Competitors: 6 in 4 sports
- Flag bearer: Yves Clausse
- Medals: Gold 0 Silver 0 Bronze 0 Total 0

Summer Olympics appearances (overview)
- 1900; 1904–1908; 1912; 1920; 1924; 1928; 1932; 1936; 1948; 1952; 1956; 1960; 1964; 1968; 1972; 1976; 1980; 1984; 1988; 1992; 1996; 2000; 2004; 2008; 2012; 2016; 2020; 2024

Luxembourg competed at the 1992 Summer Olympics in Barcelona, Spain.

== Competitors ==
The following is the list of number of competitors in the Games.

Sport	Men	Women	Total
Archery	0	1	1
Judo	1	0	1
Shooting	3	0	3
Swimming	1	0	1
Total	5	1	6

== Results by event ==
=== Archery ===
In its fifth appearance in Olympic archery, Luxembourg was represented by one woman. She did not advance to the elimination rounds.

Women's Individual Competition:

Athlete	Event	Ranking round		Round of 64	Round of 32	Round of 16	Quarterfinals	Semifinals	Final / BM	
Athlete	Event	Score	Seed	Opposition Score	Opposition Score	Opposition Score	Opposition Score	Opposition Score	Opposition Score	Rank
Jeannette Goergen-Philip	Women's Individual	1,261	38	Did not advance						

=== Shooting ===
Athlete	Event	Qualification		Final	
Athlete	Event	Points	Rank	Points	Rank
Jean-Claude Kremer	10m Air Rifle	584	27	Did not advance	
Michel Think	Mixed Trap	140	29	Did not advance	
Constant Wagner	Men's 10m Air Pistol	570	35	Did not advance	

=== Swimming ===
Men's 50m Freestyle

Athlete	Event	Heat		Semifinal		Final	
Athlete	Event	Time	Rank	Time	Rank	Time	Rank
Yves Clausse	50m Freestyle	DQ		Did not advance			

Men's 100m Freestyle

Athlete	Event	Heat		Semifinal		Final	
Athlete	Event	Time	Rank	Time	Rank	Time	Rank
Yves Clausse	100m Freestyle	51.47	6	Did not advance			

Men's 200m Freestyle

Athlete	Event	Heat		Semifinal		Final	
Athlete	Event	Time	Rank	Time	Rank	Time	Rank
Yves Clausse	200m Freestyle	1:54.45	4	Did not advance			
