= Luxembourg at the 1980 Summer Olympics =

- Flag of the Olympic Movement
- IOC code: LUX
- NOC: Luxembourg Olympic and Sporting Committee

in Moscow
- Competitors: 3 in 3 sports
- Medals: Gold 0 Silver 0 Bronze 0 Total 0

Summer Olympics appearances (overview)
- 1900; 1904–1908; 1912; 1920; 1924; 1928; 1932; 1936; 1948; 1952; 1956; 1960; 1964; 1968; 1972; 1976; 1980; 1984; 1988; 1992; 1996; 2000; 2004; 2008; 2012; 2016; 2020; 2024

Luxembourg competed at the 1980 Summer Olympics in Moscow, USSR. In partial support of the American-led boycott of the 1980 Summer Olympics, Luxembourg competed under the Olympic Flag instead of its national flag.

== Results by event ==
=== Archery ===
After not competing in archery in 1976, Luxembourg returned to the sport in 1980 with one competitor.

Men's Individual Competition:

- Andre Braun - 2386 points (→ 16th place)

=== Athletics ===
Men's 20 km Walk

- Lucien Faber

- Final — did not finish (→ no ranking)

=== Shooting ===
50 metre rifle three positions

- Roland Jacoby - 34th place

50 metre rifle prone

- Roland Jacoby - 11th place
