= Luxembourg at the 2020 Summer Olympics =

- IOC code: LUX
- NOC: Luxembourg Olympic and Sporting Committee
- Website: www.teamletzebuerg.lu (in French)

in Tokyo, Japan 23 July 2021 – 8 August 2021
- Competitors: 12 in 7 sports
- Flag bearers (opening): Christine Majerus; Raphaël Stacchiotti
- Flag bearer (closing): Bob Bertemes
- Medals: Gold 0 Silver 0 Bronze 0 Total 0

Summer Olympics appearances (overview)
- 1900; 1904–1908; 1912; 1920; 1924; 1928; 1932; 1936; 1948; 1952; 1956; 1960; 1964; 1968; 1972; 1976; 1980; 1984; 1988; 1992; 1996; 2000; 2004; 2008; 2012; 2016; 2020; 2024

Luxembourg competed at the 2020 Summer Olympics in Tokyo. Originally scheduled to take place from 24 July to 9 August 2020, the Games were postponed to 23 July to 8 August 2021, because of the COVID-19 pandemic. Since the nation's official debut in 1900, Luxembourg athletes have appeared in every edition of the Summer Olympic Games, with the exception of the 1904 and 1908 Summer Olympics, and the 1932 Summer Olympics in Los Angeles at the period of the worldwide Great Depression.

== Competitors ==
The following is the list of number of competitors in the Games.

Sport	Men	Women	Total
Archery	1	0	1
Athletics	2	0	2
Cycling	2	1	3
Equestrian	1	0	1
Swimming	1	1	2
Table tennis	0	2	2
Triathlon	1	0	1
Total	8	4	12

== Archery ==
Luxembourg archers booked Olympic places in the men's individual recurve based on the world ranking.

Athlete	Event	Ranking round		Round of 64	Round of 32	Round of 16	Quarterfinals	Semifinals	Final / BM	
Athlete	Event	Score	Seed	Opposition Score	Opposition Score	Opposition Score	Opposition Score	Opposition Score	Opposition Score	Rank
Jeff Henckels	Men's individual	646	55	Gazoz (TUR); L 0–6	Did not advance					

== Athletics ==
Luxembourgian athletes achieved the entry standards, either by qualifying time or by world ranking, in the following track and field events (up to a maximum of 3 athletes in each event):

Key

- Note–Ranks given for track events are within the athlete's heat only
- Q = Qualified for the next round
- q = Qualified for the next round as a fastest loser or, in field events, by position without achieving the qualifying target
- NR = National record
- N/A = Round not applicable for the event
- Bye = Athlete not required to compete in round

Track & road events

Athlete	Event	Heat		Semifinal		Final	
Athlete	Event	Result	Rank	Result	Rank	Result	Rank
Charles Grethen	Men's 1500 m	3:41.90	6 Q	3:32.86 NR	6 q	3:36.80	12

Field events

Athlete	Event	Qualification		Final	
Athlete	Event	Distance	Position	Distance	Position
Bob Bertemes	Men's shot put	20.16	21	Did not advance	

== Cycling ==
=== Road ===
Luxembourg entered a squad of three riders (two men and one woman) to compete in their respective Olympic road races, by virtue of their top 50 national finish (for men) and top 22 (for women) in the UCI World Ranking.

Athlete	Event	Time	Rank
Kevin Geniets	Men's road race	6:15:38	37
Michel Ries	Men's road race	6:21:46	73
Christine Majerus	Women's road race	3:55:13	20
Christine Majerus	Women's time trial	34:34.13	21

== Equestrian ==
Luxembourg entered one dressage rider into the Olympic equestrian competition, by finishing in the top two, outside the group selection, of the individual FEI Olympic Rankings for Group B (South Western Europe), marking the country's debut in the sport.

=== Dressage ===
Athlete	Horse	Event	Grand Prix		Grand Prix Freestyle		Overall	
Athlete	Horse	Event	Score	Rank	Technical	Artistic	Score	Rank
Nicolas Wagner	Quarter Back Junior	Individual	70.512	25	Did not advance			

Qualification Legend: Q = Qualified for the final; q = Qualified for the final as a lucky loser

== Swimming ==
Luxembourgian swimmers further achieved qualifying standards in the following events (up to a maximum of 2 swimmers in each event at the Olympic Qualifying Time (OQT), and potentially 1 at the Olympic Selection Time (OST)):

Athlete	Event	Heat		Semifinal		Final	
Athlete	Event	Time	Rank	Time	Rank	Time	Rank
Raphaël Stacchiotti	Men's 200 m individual medley	2:03.17	42	Did not advance			
Julie Meynen	Women's 50 m freestyle	25.36	=25	Did not advance			
Julie Meynen	Women's 100 m freestyle	55.69	32	Did not advance			

== Table tennis ==
Luxembourg entered two athletes into the table tennis competition at the Games. Going to her sixth straight Olympics, Ni Xialian secured one of three available spots in the women's singles with a bronze medal victory at the 2019 European Games in Minsk, Belarus. Meanwhile, Sarah de Nutte was automatically selected among the top ten table tennis players vying for qualification to join Ni Xialian in the same event based on the ITTF Olympic Rankings of June 1, 2021.

Athlete	Event	Preliminary	Round 1	Round 2	Round 3	Round of 16	Quarterfinals	Semifinals	Final / BM	
Athlete	Event	Opposition Result	Opposition Result	Opposition Result	Opposition Result	Opposition Result	Opposition Result	Opposition Result	Opposition Result	Rank
Sarah de Nutte	Women's singles	Bye	Trifonova (BUL); L 3–4	Did not advance						
Ni Xialian	Women's singles	Bye		Shin Y-b (KOR); L 3–4	Did not advance					

== Triathlon ==
Luxembourg qualified a single triathlete via the Individual World Rankings, signifying the nation's Olympic return to the sport for the first time since Beijing 2008.

Athlete	Event	Time						Rank
Athlete	Event	Swim (1.5 km)	Trans 1	Bike (40 km)	Trans 2	Run (10 km)	Total	Rank
Stefan Zachäus	Men's	17:56	0:39	56:29	0:32	36:45	1:52:21	44
