= Luxembourg at the 1964 Summer Olympics =

- IOC code: LUX
- NOC: Luxembourg Olympic and Sporting Committee

in Tokyo
- Competitors: 12 in 7 sports
- Flag bearer: Josy Stoffel
- Medals: Gold 0 Silver 0 Bronze 0 Total 0

Summer Olympics appearances (overview)
- 1900; 1904–1908; 1912; 1920; 1924; 1928; 1932; 1936; 1948; 1952; 1956; 1960; 1964; 1968; 1972; 1976; 1980; 1984; 1988; 1992; 1996; 2000; 2004; 2008; 2012; 2016; 2020; 2024

Luxembourg competed at the 1964 Summer Olympics in Tokyo, Japan. 12 competitors, 10 men and 2 women, took part in 18 events in 7 sports.

== Cycling ==
Two cyclists represented Luxembourg in 1964.

Individual road race

- Johny Schleck – 4:39:51.74 (→ 19th place)
- Edy Schütz – 4:39:51.79 (→ 76th place)

== Fencing ==
Two fencers, both women, represented Luxembourg in 1964.

Women's foil

- Ginette Rossini
- Colette Flesch

== Shooting ==
One shooter represented Luxembourg in 1964.

50 m rifle, three positions

- Victor Kremer

50 m rifle, prone

- Victor Kremer

== Swimming ==
Men

Athlete	Event	Heat		Semifinal		Final	
Athlete	Event	Time	Rank	Time	Rank	Time	Rank
Georges Welbes	100 m freestyle	58.6	52	Did not advance			
