= Luxembourg at the 1936 Summer Olympics =

- IOC code: LUX
- NOC: Luxembourg Olympic and Sporting Committee

in Berlin
- Competitors: 49 (48 men, 1 woman) in 10 sports
- Flag bearer: Jean Wagner
- Medals: Gold 0 Silver 0 Bronze 0 Total 0

Summer Olympics appearances (overview)
- 1900; 1904–1908; 1912; 1920; 1924; 1928; 1932; 1936; 1948; 1952; 1956; 1960; 1964; 1968; 1972; 1976; 1980; 1984; 1988; 1992; 1996; 2000; 2004; 2008; 2012; 2016; 2020; 2024

Luxembourg competed at the 1936 Summer Olympics in Berlin, Germany. The nation returned to the Summer Games after having missed the 1932 Summer Olympics. 49 competitors, 48 men and 1 woman, took part in 35 events in 10 sports.

== Cycling ==
Four cyclists, all men, represented Luxembourg in 1936.

Individual road race

- Jacques Majerus
- Franz Neuens
- Paul Frantz
- Rudy Houtsch

Team road race

- Jacques Majerus
- Franz Neuens
- Paul Frantz
- Rudy Houtsch

== Swimming ==
Ranks given are within the heat.

Men

Athlete	Event	Heat		Semifinal		Final	
Athlete	Event	Time	Rank	Time	Rank	Time	Rank
Marcel Neumann	100 m backstroke	1:18.8	6	Did not advance			
Norbert Franck; Pierre Hastert; Marcel Neumann; Georges Tandel	4 × 200 m freestyle relay	—N/a		10:59.8	6	Did not advance	
