= Norbert Haupert =

Luxembourgish middle-distance runner and politician (1940–2026)

Personal information
- Born: 2 April 1940 Schifflange, Luxembourg
- Died: 27 October 2026 (aged 86)

Sport
- Sport: Track and field
Medal record
Representing Luxembourg
Summer Universiade
| Bronze medal – third place | 1963 Porto Alegre | 1500m |

Norbert Haupert (2 April 1940 – 27 October 2026) was a Luxembourgish athlete and politician of the Christian Social People's Party.

== Biography ==
As an athlete, he ran middle distance, dominating Luxembourgish middle distance running in the early 1960s and twice doubling up to win both the 800 metres and 1500 metres at the Luxembourgish national championships. He also won the bronze medal at the 800 metres at the 1963 Summer Universiade. He represented Luxembourg at the 1960 Summer Olympics.

He was a member of the Chamber of Deputies from 1999 to 2013, representing the South constituency. Like Josy Barthel before him, Haupert spanned the divide between sport and politics by heading the Luxembourg Athletics Federation and the Luxembourgish Olympic and Sporting Committee.

In addition to having sat in the Chamber (1999-2013), Haupert was a member of the Mondercange communal council beginning on 1 January 1999 until 2015.

Haupert died on 27 October 2026, at the age of 86.

== Footnotes ==
Sporting positions
| Preceded by Josy Barthel | President of the FLA; 1973–1979 | Succeeded by Mil Jung |
| Preceded by Gérard Rasquin | President of the COSL; 1989–1999 | Succeeded by Marc Theisen |
