= Luxembourg at the 1984 Summer Olympics =

- IOC code: LUX
- NOC: Luxembourg Olympic and Sporting Committee

in Los Angeles
- Flag bearer: Jeannette Goergen-Philip
- Medals: Gold 0 Silver 0 Bronze 0 Total 0

Summer Olympics appearances (overview)
- 1900; 1904–1908; 1912; 1920; 1924; 1928; 1932; 1936; 1948; 1952; 1956; 1960; 1964; 1968; 1972; 1976; 1980; 1984; 1988; 1992; 1996; 2000; 2004; 2008; 2012; 2016; 2020; 2024

Luxembourg competed at the 1984 Summer Olympics in Los Angeles, United States.

== Results by event ==
=== Archery ===
In its third appearance in Olympic archer, Luxembourg was represented by two men and one woman. Veteran Andre Braun improved his score from four years earlier by over 70 points, but dropped eight places in the rankings due to a more competitive field. Jeannette Goergen tied Braun's 1980 performance for best ranking, at 16th place.

Women's Individual Competition

Athlete	Event	Ranking round		Round of 64	Round of 32	Round of 16	Quarterfinals	Semifinals	Final / BM	
Athlete	Event	Score	Seed	Opposition Score	Opposition Score	Opposition Score	Opposition Score	Opposition Score	Opposition Score	Rank
Jeannette Goergen	Women's Individual	2452	16	Did not advance						

Men's Individual Competition

Athlete	Event	Ranking round		Round of 64	Round of 32	Round of 16	Quarterfinals	Semifinals	Final / BM	
Athlete	Event	Score	Seed	Opposition Score	Opposition Score	Opposition Score	Opposition Score	Opposition Score	Opposition Score	Rank
Andre Braun	Men's Individual	2459	24	Did not advance						
Jean Claude Rohla	Men's Individual	2421	32	Did not advance						

=== Athletics ===
Men's Marathon

Athlete	Event	Final	
Athlete	Event	Result	Rank
Marc Agosta	Marathon	2:27.41	54
