= Luxembourg at the 1920 Summer Olympics =

- IOC code: LUX
- NOC: Luxembourg Olympic and Sporting Committee

in Antwerp
- Flag bearer: Alex Servais
- Medals Ranked 19th: Gold 0 Silver 1 Bronze 0 Total 1

Summer Olympics appearances (overview)
- 1900; 1904–1908; 1912; 1920; 1924; 1928; 1932; 1936; 1948; 1952; 1956; 1960; 1964; 1968; 1972; 1976; 1980; 1984; 1988; 1992; 1996; 2000; 2004; 2008; 2012; 2016; 2020; 2024

Luxembourg competed at the 1920 Summer Olympics in Antwerp, Belgium.

== Medalists ==
Medal	Name	Sport	Event	Date
Silver	Joseph Alzin	Weightlifting	Men's Heavyweight	August 31

== Aquatics ==
=== Swimming ===
Two swimmers, both men, represented Luxembourg in 1920. It was the nation's debut in the sport. Neither of the swimmers advanced past the quarterfinals.

Ranks given are within the heat.

Men

Swimmer	Event	Quarterfinals		Semifinals		Final	
Swimmer	Event	Result	Rank	Result	Rank	Result	Rank
Théodore Michel	200 m breast	Unknown	4	did not advance			
Léon Pesch	100 m free	Unknown	4	did not advance			

== Athletics ==
Seven athletes represented Luxembourg in 1920. It was the nation's third appearance in athletics, having competed in the sport each time Luxembourg had appeared at the Olympics. The country's best result of the Games was a sixth-place finish in the 4x100 relay.

Ranks given are within the heat.

Athlete	Event	Heats		Quarterfinals		Semifinals		Final	
Athlete	Event	Result	Rank	Result	Rank	Result	Rank	Result	Rank
Jean Colbach	100 m		5	did not advance					
Paul Hammer	100 m		6	did not advance					
Paul Hammer	200 m	24.0	4	did not advance					
Paul Hammer	Long jump	5.45	28	N/A				did not advance	
Nicolas Kanivé	Long jump	5.415	29	N/A				did not advance	
Henri Pleger	Long jump	5.815	23	N/A				did not advance	
Henri Pleger	High jump	1.60	20	N/A				did not advance	
Jean Proess	400 m	53.2	3	did not advance					
Jean Proess	800 m	N/A		2:12	9	did not advance			
Alex Servais	100 m		5	did not advance					
Alex Servais	Javelin throw	40.08	21	N/A				did not advance	
Jean Colbach; Paul Hammer; Jean Proess; Alex Servais	4 × 100 m relay	N/A				44.4	2 Q	43.6	6

== Cycling ==
A single cyclist represented Luxembourg in 1920. It was the nation's debut in the sport. Majérus did not advance past the initial heats in the sprint event, and did not finish the 50 kilometres.

=== Track cycling ===
Ranks given are within the heat.

Cyclist	Event	Heats		Quarterfinals		Repechage semis		Repechage final		Semifinals		Final	
Cyclist	Event	Result	Rank	Result	Rank	Result	Rank	Result	Rank	Result	Rank	Result	Rank
Jean Majérus	Sprint	Unknown	3	did not advance									
Jean Majérus	50 km	N/A										did not finish	

== Football ==
Luxembourg competed in the Olympic football tournament for the first time. The team lost to the Netherlands in the first round.

Team roster

- Charles Krüger
- Joseph Koetz
- Thomas Schmit
- Émile Hamilius
- Martin Ungeheuer
- Camille Schumacher
- Arthur Leesch
- Joseph Massard
- Robert Elter
- François Langers
- Léon Metzler

First round

August 28, 1920

Netherlands	3–0	Luxembourg
J. Bulder 30'; Groosjohan 47' 85'	Report

La Butte, Brussels
Attendance: 3,000
Referee: Georges Hubrecht (BEL)

Final rank
10th

== Weightlifting ==
Three weightlifters represented Luxembourg in 1920. It was the nation's debut in the sport. Alzin won the country's first medal in the sport, a silver in the heavyweight.

Weightlifter	Event	Final	
Weightlifter	Event	Result	Rank
Joseph Alzin	+82.5 kg	260.0	2nd place, silver medalist(s)
Johny Grün	67.5 kg	210.0	8
Michel Mertens	60 kg	did not finish	

== Wrestling ==
Two wrestlers, both in the Greco-Roman style, competed for Luxembourg in 1920. Both men lost all of their matches.

=== Greco-Roman ===
Wrestler	Event	Round of 32	Round of 16	Quarterfinals	Semifinals	Finals	Rank
Wrestler	Event	Round of 32	Round of 16	Silver quarters	Silver semis	Silver match	Rank
Wrestler	Event	Round of 32	Round of 16	Bronze quarters	Bronze semis	Bronze match	Rank
Michel Dechmann	Middleweight	Bye	Westergren (SWE) (L)	did not advance			10
Michel Dechmann	Middleweight	Bye	Westergren (SWE) (L)	Vanderleenden (BEL) (L)	did not advance		10
Michel Dechmann	Middleweight	Bye	Westergren (SWE) (L)	did not advance			10
Oscar Theisen	Light heavyweight	Tázler (TCH) (L)	did not advance	did not advance			17
Oscar Theisen	Light heavyweight	Tázler (TCH) (L)	did not advance	N/A	did not advance		17
Oscar Theisen	Light heavyweight	Tázler (TCH) (L)	did not advance	N/A			17

Opponent nation	Wins	Losses	Percent
Belgium	0	1	.000
Czechoslovakia	0	1	.000
Sweden	0	1	.000
Total	0	3	.000

Round	Wins	Losses	Percent
Round of 32	0	1	.000
Round of 16	0	1	.000
Quarterfinals	0	0	–
Semifinals	0	0	–
Final	0	0	–
Silver quarterfinals	0	1	.000
Silver semifinals	0	0	–
Silver match	0	0	–
Bronze quarterfinals	0	0	–
Bronze semifinals	0	0	–
Bronze match	0	0	–
Total	0	3	.000

== Sources ==
- Belgium Olympic Committee (1957). Olympic Games Antwerp 1920: Official Report (in French).
- Wudarski, Pawel (1999). "Wyniki Igrzysk Olimpijskich" (in Polish).
- International Olympic Committee results database
