= Luxembourg at the Olympics =

- IOC code: LUX
- NOC: Luxembourg Olympic and Sporting Committee
- Website: www.teamletzebuerg.lu (in French)
- Medals Ranked 96th: Gold 1 Silver 3 Bronze 0 Total 4

Summer appearances
- 1900; 1904–1908; 1912; 1920; 1924; 1928; 1932; 1936; 1948; 1952; 1956; 1960; 1964; 1968; 1972; 1976; 1980; 1984; 1988; 1992; 1996; 2000; 2004; 2008; 2012; 2016; 2020; 2024; 2028

Winter appearances
- 1928; 1932; 1936; 1948–1984; 1988; 1992; 1994; 1998; 2002; 2006; 2010; 2014; 2018; 2022; 2026

Luxembourg's National Olympic Committee, the Luxembourg Olympic and Sporting Committee, was founded in 1912 and sent its first team to the 1912 Summer Olympics in Stockholm.

Only two athletes won medals competing for Luxembourg in the Summer Olympics: weightlifter Joseph Alzin, silver in 1920, and runner Josy Barthel, gold in 1952. In the late 20th-century, it was discovered that runner Michel Théato, whose gold medal in marathon at the 1900 Games was previously given to France, was actually Luxembourgish. Although Théato moved to Paris and lived there until his death in 1923, there is no record that he ever filed for French citizenship. Nevertheless, as he represented a French club, his participation and gold medal are credited to France by the International Olympic Committee (IOC).

Luxembourg first competed at the Winter Olympic Games in 1928, and has taken part in a total of 11 Winter Games. Thus, despite having been one of the earliest countries to take part, Luxembourg has competed in relatively few of the Games. To date, Luxembourg has won a total of two medals: both silver, and won by Marc Girardelli in 1992.

After Luxembourg's first appearance, in St. Moritz, and the country's second appearance, at the 1936 Games in Garmisch-Partenkirchen, Luxembourg did not compete at the Winter Olympics for another five decades. As a low-lying country, whose highest peak (the Kneiff) lies only 560 metres (1,837 ft) above sea level, Luxembourg had little pedigree in most Winter Olympic sports.

However, the naturalisation of Marc Girardelli, an Austrian-born alpine skier, saw Luxembourg return to the Games in 1988. In the following Winter Olympics, in 1992 in Albertville, Girardelli won Luxembourg's first two Winter Olympic medals, scooping silver in both the giant slalom and super-G.

Neither Girardelli, nor Luxembourg, has won another Winter medal since 1992, but the country's return to the Winter world stage has been maintained by the appearance of two ice skaters in subsequent Games: Patrick Schmit in 1998 and Fleur Maxwell in 2006.

Luxembourg qualified for the 2010 Winter Olympics with two athletes but did not participate because one did not reach the criteria set by the NOC and the other was injured before the Games.

== Medal tables ==
=== Medals by Summer Games ===
Games	Athletes	Gold	Silver	Bronze	Total	Rank
1900 Paris	did not participate					
1904 St. Louis	did not participate					
1908 London	did not participate					
1912 Stockholm	21	0	0	0	0	–
1920 Antwerp	26	0	1	0	1	19
1924 Paris	51	0	0	0	0	–
1928 Amsterdam	49	0	0	0	0	–
1932 Los Angeles	did not participate					
1936 Berlin	49	0	0	0	0	–
1948 London	47	0	0	0	0	–
1952 Helsinki	44	1	0	0	1	27
1956 Melbourne	11	0	0	0	0	–
1960 Rome	52	0	0	0	0	–
1964 Tokyo	12	0	0	0	0	–
1968 Mexico City	5	0	0	0	0	–
1972 Munich	11	0	0	0	0	–
1976 Montreal	8	0	0	0	0	–
1980 Moscow	3	0	0	0	0	–
1984 Los Angeles	5	0	0	0	0	–
1988 Seoul	8	0	0	0	0	–
1992 Barcelona	6	0	0	0	0	–
1996 Atlanta	6	0	0	0	0	–
2000 Sydney	4	0	0	0	0	–
2004 Athens	10	0	0	0	0	–
2008 Beijing	12	0	0	0	0	–
2012 London	9	0	0	0	0	–
2016 Rio de Janeiro	10	0	0	0	0	–
2020 Tokyo	12	0	0	0	0	–
2024 Paris	14	0	0	0	0	–
2028 Los Angeles	future event					
2032 Brisbane	future event					
Total		1	1	0	2	96

Notes

- ^{ART} Art competitions (1912–1948) are not included in the medal table above, as they were non-sports events formerly part of the Olympic Games. (Note: In 1952, art competition medals, as well as the gold medal awards for feats in alpinism and aeronautics, were removed from the official national medal counts. Only since 2021 have they been officially listed again by the IOC in the medal tables and respective National Olympic Committee (NOC) profiles on its website.) Luxembourg won a total of three art competition medals (2 gold, and 1 silver), across the 1924, and 1928 Summer Olympics.
- ^{NAT} Athletes at the early Olympic Games (1896, 1900, and 1904) are attributed by the International Olympic Committee (IOC) according to the national affiliation of their club ot team, rather than their nationality. (Note: In 2024, the IOC reinstated its original and current attribution policy for athletes at the early Olympic Games (1896, 1900, and 1904). From 2021 to 2024, the IOC briefly attributed medals in individual events according to the athlete's nationality, even when the athlete represented a foreign club or team Since 2024, participation and medals have instead been attributed according to the national affiliation of the club or team represented by the athlete.) Luxembourgish-born Michel Théato competed for the French club, Club Amical et Sportif de Saint-Mandékn, and won the men's marathon at the 1900 Summer Olympics. As he represented a French club, his participation and gold medal are credited to France by the IOC.

=== Medals by Winter Games ===
Games	Athletes	Gold	Silver	Bronze	Total	Rank
1928 St. Moritz	5	0	0	0	0	–
1932 Lake Placid	did not participate					
1936 Garmisch-Partenkirchen	4	0	0	0	0	–
1948–1984	did not participate					
1988 Calgary	1	0	0	0	0	–
1992 Albertville	1	0	2	0	2	16
1994 Lillehammer	1	0	0	0	0	–
1998 Nagano	1	0	0	0	0	–
2002 Salt Lake City	did not participate					
2006 Turin	1	0	0	0	0	–
2010 Vancouver	did not participate					
2014 Sochi	1	0	0	0	0	–
2018 Pyeongchang	1	0	0	0	0	–
2022 Beijing	2	0	0	0	0	–
2026 Milano Cortina	2	0	0	0	0	–
2030 French Alps	future event					
2034 Utah	future event					
Total		0	2	0	2	44

=== Medals by summer sport ===
Sport	Gold	Silver	Bronze	Total
Athletics	1	0	0	1
Weightlifting	0	1	0	1
Totals (2 entries)	1	1	0	2

=== Medals by winter sport ===
Sport	Gold	Silver	Bronze	Total
Alpine skiing	0	2	0	2
Totals (1 entries)	0	2	0	2

== List of medalists ==
Medal	Name	Games	Sport	Event
Gold	Josy Barthel	1952 Helsinki	Athletics	Men's 1500m
Silver	Joseph Alzin	1920 Antwerp	Weightlifting	Men's Heavyweight
Silver	Marc Girardelli	1992 Albertville	Alpine skiing	Men's super-G
Silver	Marc Girardelli	1992 Albertville	Alpine skiing	Men's giant slalom

== See also ==
- List of flag bearers for Luxembourg at the Olympics
- Category:Olympic competitors for Luxembourg
- Luxembourg at the Paralympics
