= Luxembourg at the 1968 Summer Olympics =

- IOC code: LUX
- NOC: Luxembourg Olympic and Sporting Committee

in Mexico City
- Competitors: 5 in 5 sports
- Flag bearer: Charles Sowa
- Medals: Gold 0 Silver 0 Bronze 0 Total 0

Summer Olympics appearances (overview)
- 1900; 1904–1908; 1912; 1920; 1924; 1928; 1932; 1936; 1948; 1952; 1956; 1960; 1964; 1968; 1972; 1976; 1980; 1984; 1988; 1992; 1996; 2000; 2004; 2008; 2012; 2016; 2020; 2024

Luxembourg competed at the 1968 Summer Olympics in Mexico City, Mexico. Five competitors, three men and two women, took part in seven events in five sports.

== Athletics ==
Men
Track and road events

Athletes	Events	Final	
Athletes	Events	Time	Rank
Charles Sowa	20 km walk	1:40:17.0	19
Charles Sowa	50 km walk	4:44:45.2	16

== Cycling ==
One cyclists represented Luxembourg in 1968.

Individual road race

- Roger Gilson – 5:05:12.29 hrs (→ 54th place)

== Fencing ==
One fencer, a woman, represented Luxembourg in 1968.

Women's foil

- Colette Flesch – defeated in first round

== Shooting ==
One shooter represented Luxembourg in 1968.

Men's 50 m pistol

- Nico Klein – 543 pts (→ 30th place)

== Swimming ==
Women's 100 metres breaststroke

- Arlette Wilmes

- Heats – 1:24.4 min (→ 6th in heat, did not advance)

Women's 200 metres breaststroke

- Arlette Wilmes

- Heats – 3:06.7 min (→ 6th in heat, did not advance)
