= Luxembourg at the 2024 Summer Paralympics =

- IPC code: LUX
- NPC: Luxembourg Paralympic Committee

in Paris, France August 28, 2024 – September 8, 2024
- Competitors: 2 (1 man and 1 woman) in 1 sport
- Flag bearers: Tom Habscheid; Katrin Kohl
- Medals Ranked 79th: Gold 0 Silver 0 Bronze 1 Total 1

Summer Paralympics appearances (overview)
- 1976; 1980; 1984; 1988; 1992; 1996; 2000–2004; 2008; 2012–2016; 2020; 2024

Luxembourg competed at the 2024 Summer Paralympics in Paris, France, from 28 August to 8 September 2024. This was the nation's eighth time competing at the Summer Paralympic Games after it made its debut at the 1976 Summer Paralympics. The delegation consisted of two competitors from one sport.

== Medalists ==
Medal	Name	Sport	Event	Date
Bronze	Tom Habscheid	Athletics	Men's shot put F63	7 September

== Competitors ==
The following is the list of number of competitors in the Games.

Sport	Men	Women	Total
Athletics	1	1	2
Total	1	1	2

== Athletics ==
Athlete	Event	Heat		Final	
Athlete	Event	Result	Rank	Result	Rank
Katrin Kohl	Women's 100 metres T54	20.39	7	Did not advance	
Tom Habscheid	Men's shot put F63	—		14.97	3rd place, bronze medalist(s)

== See also ==
- Luxembourg at the 2024 Summer Olympics
- Luxembourg at the Paralympics
