= Luxembourg at the 1976 Summer Paralympics =

- IPC code: LUX
- NPC: Luxembourg Paralympic Committee
- Website: www.paralympics.lu

in Toronto
- Competitors: 3 in 2 sports
- Medals Ranked 34th: Gold 0 Silver 0 Bronze 0 Total 0

Summer Paralympics appearances (overview)
- 1976; 1980; 1984; 1988; 1992; 1996; 2000–2004; 2008; 2012–2016; 2020; 2024

Luxembourg made its Paralympic Games début at the 1976 Summer Paralympics in Toronto, Ontario, Canada. The country was represented by two competitors in archery, and one in swimming.

== Archery ==
Name	Event	Score	Rank
Françoise Reuter	Women's FITA round open	1721 points	11th (out of 14)
L. Weyland	Men's novice round open	609 points	7th (out of 21)

== Swimming ==
Name	Event	Time	Rank
Albert Thewes	Men's 25 metre butterfly 4	36.64s	11th (out of 11) in the heats did not advance
Albert Thewes	Men's 50 metre backstroke 4	57.39s	16th (out of 17) in the heats did not advance
Albert Thewes	Men's 50 metre breaststroke 4	1:10.37	18th (out of 19) in the heats did not advance
Albert Thewes	Men's 50 metre freestyle 4	48.32s	18th (out of 23) in the heats did not advance

== See also ==
- Luxembourg at the Paralympics
- Luxembourg at the 1976 Summer Olympics
