= Luxembourg at the 2008 Summer Olympics =

- IOC code: LUX
- NOC: Luxembourg Olympic and Sporting Committee
- Website: www.teamletzebuerg.lu (in French)

in Beijing
- Competitors: 13 in 7 sports
- Flag bearers: Raphaël Stacchiotti (opening); Sascha Palgen (closing)
- Medals: Gold 0 Silver 0 Bronze 0 Total 0

Summer Olympics appearances (overview)
- 1900; 1904–1908; 1912; 1920; 1924; 1928; 1932; 1936; 1948; 1952; 1956; 1960; 1964; 1968; 1972; 1976; 1980; 1984; 1988; 1992; 1996; 2000; 2004; 2008; 2012; 2016; 2020; 2024

Luxembourg was represented at the 2008 Summer Olympics in Beijing, China by the Luxembourg Olympic and Sporting Committee.

In total, 13 athletes including nine men and four women represented Luxembourg in seven different sports including cycling, gymnastics, judo, sailing, swimming, table tennis and triathlon.

== Competitors ==
In total, 13 athletes represented Luxembourg at the 2008 Summer Olympics in Beijing, China across seven different sports.

Sport	Men	Women	Total
Cycling	3	0	3
Gymnastics	1	0	1
Judo	0	1	1
Sailing	1	0	1
Swimming	3	1	4
Table tennis	0	1	1
Triathlon	1	1	2
Total	9	4	13

== Cycling ==
In total, three Luxembourger athletes participated in the cycling events – Kim Kirchen, Andy Schleck and Fränk Schleck.

Athlete	Event	Time	Rank
Kim Kirchen	Men's road race	6:26:40	45
Kim Kirchen	Men's time trial	1:06:29	23
Andy Schleck	Men's road race	6:23:49	4
Fränk Schleck	Men's road race	6:26:27	42

== Gymnastics ==
In total, one Luxembourger athlete participated in the gymnastics events – Sascha Palgen in the men's artistic individual all-around.

Athlete	Event	Qualification								Final							
Athlete	Event	Apparatus						Total	Rank	Apparatus						Total	Rank
Athlete	Event	F	PH	R	V	PB	HB	Total	Rank	F	PH	R	V	PB	HB	Total	Rank
Sascha Palgen	All-around	15.200	13.000	14.325	15.725	14.225	13.600	86.075	37	Did not advance							

== Judo ==
In total, one Luxembourger athlete participated in the judo events – Marie Müller in the women's −52 kg category.

Athlete	Event	Round of 32	Round of 16	Quarterfinals	Semifinals	Repechage 1	Repechage 2	Repechage 3	Final / BM	
Athlete	Event	Opposition Result	Opposition Result	Opposition Result	Opposition Result	Opposition Result	Opposition Result	Opposition Result	Opposition Result	Rank
Marie Müller	Women's −52 kg	Haddad (ALG); L 0000–0211	Did not advance			Diédhiou (SEN); W 1001–0001	Kim K-O (KOR); L 0001–0010	Did not advance		

== Sailing ==
In total, one Luxembourger athlete participated in the sailing events – Marc Schmit in the men's laser.

Athlete	Event	Race											Net points	Final rank
Athlete	Event	1	2	3	4	5	6	7	8	9	10	M*	Net points	Final rank
Marc Schmit	Laser	30	39	25	35	30	35	~~41~~	40	33	CAN	EL	227	42

M = Medal race; EL = Eliminated – did not advance into the medal race; CAN = Race cancelled;

== Swimming ==
In total, four Luxembourger athletes participated in the swimming events – Laurent Carnol in the men's 200 m breaststroke, Christine Mailliet in the women's 200 m freestyle, Alwin de Prins in the men's 100 m breaststroke and Raphaël Stacchiotti in the men's 200 m freestyle.

Men

Athlete	Event	Heat		Semifinal		Final	
Athlete	Event	Time	Rank	Time	Rank	Time	Rank
Laurent Carnol	200 m breaststroke	2:15.87	40	Did not advance			
Alwin de Prins	100 m breaststroke	1:03.64	51	Did not advance			
Raphaël Stacchiotti	200 m freestyle	1:42.01	49	Did not advance			

Women

Athlete	Event	Heat		Semifinal		Final	
Athlete	Event	Time	Rank	Time	Rank	Time	Rank
Christine Mailliet	200 m freestyle	2:02.91	39	Did not advance			

== Table tennis ==
In total, one Luxembourger athlete participated in the table tennis events – Ni Xialian in the women's singles.

Athlete	Event	Preliminary round	Round 1	Round 2	Round 3	Round 4	Quarterfinals	Semifinals	Final / BM	
Athlete	Event	Opposition Result	Opposition Result	Opposition Result	Opposition Result	Opposition Result	Opposition Result	Opposition Result	Opposition Result	Rank
Ni Xialian	Women's singles	Bye		Huang I-h (TPE); W 4–1	Li J (NED); L 1–4	Did not advance				

== Triathlon ==
In total, two Luxembourger athletes participated in the triathlon events – Dirk Bockel in the men's race and Elizabeth May in the women's race.

Athlete	Event	Swim (1.5 km)	Trans 1	Bike (40 km)	Trans 2	Run (10 km)	Total Time	Rank
Dirk Bockel	Men's	18:26	0:27	57:52	0:27	34:19	1:51:31.01	25
Elizabeth May	Women's	20:26	0:30	1:05:56	0:33	40:30	2:07:55.58	41
