= Luxembourg at the 2024 Summer Olympics =

- IOC code: LUX
- NOC: Luxembourg Olympic and Sporting Committee
- Website: www.teamletzebuerg.lu (in French)

in Paris, France 26 July 2024 – 11 August 2024
- Competitors: 13 (7 men and 6 women) in 7 sports
- Flag bearers: Bob Bertemes & Ni Xialian
- Medals: Gold 0 Silver 0 Bronze 0 Total 0

Summer Olympics appearances (overview)
- 1900; 1904–1908; 1912; 1920; 1924; 1928; 1932; 1936; 1948; 1952; 1956; 1960; 1964; 1968; 1972; 1976; 1980; 1984; 1988; 1992; 1996; 2000; 2004; 2008; 2012; 2016; 2020; 2024

Luxembourg competed at the 2024 Summer Olympics in Paris from 26 July to 11 August 2024. It signified the nation's participation at the Summer Olympics in all editions, since the official debut in 1900, except for three occasions: St. Louis 1904, London 1908, and Los Angeles 1932 at the period of the worldwide Great Depression.

== Competitors ==
The following is the list of number of competitors in the Games.

Sport	Men	Women	Total
Archery	1	0	1
Athletics	2	2	4
Cycling	1	1	2
Equestrian	1	0	1
Swimming	1	0	1
Table tennis	1	2	3
Triathlon	0	1	1
Total	7	6	13

== Archery ==
Luxembourg qualified one male archer to compete in the individual recurve event, through the final release of the Olympic ranking for Paris 2024.

Athlete	Event	Ranking round		Round of 64	Round of 32	Round of 16	Quarterfinals	Semifinals	Final / BM	
Athlete	Event	Score	Seed	Opposition Score	Opposition Score	Opposition Score	Opposition Score	Opposition Score	Opposition Score	Rank
Pit Klein	Men's individual	650	50	Arcila (COL); L 4–6	Did not advance					

== Athletics ==
Luxembourgian track and field athletes achieved the entry standards for Paris 2024, either by passing the direct qualifying mark (or time for track and road races) or by world ranking, in the following events (a maximum of 3 athletes each):

Key

- Note–Ranks given for track events are within the athlete's heat only
- Q = Qualified for the next round
- q = Qualified for the next round as a fastest loser or, in field events, by position without achieving the qualifying target
- NR = National record
- N/A = Round not applicable for the event
- Bye = Athlete not required to compete in round

Track & road events

Athlete	Event	Heat		Repechage		Semifinal		Final	
Athlete	Event	Result	Rank	Result	Rank	Result	Rank	Result	Rank
Ruben Querinjean	Men's 3000 m steeplechase	8:27.97	9	—				Did not advance	
Patrizia van der Weken	Women's 100 m	11.14	2 Q	—		11.13	4	Did not advance	
Vera Hoffmann	Women's 1500 m	4:07.64	12 R	4:11.28	10	Did not advance			

Field events

Athlete	Event	Qualification		Final	
Athlete	Event	Distance	Position	Distance	Position
Bob Bertemes	Men's shot put	20.27	17	Did not advance	

== Cycling ==
=== Road ===
Luxembourg entered one male and one female rider to compete in the road race events at the Olympic. Luxembourg secured those quota through the UCI Nation Ranking.

Athlete	Event	Time	Rank
Alex Kirsch	Men's road race	6:26:57	40
Christine Majerus	Women's road race	4:04:23	17

== Equestrian ==
Luxembourg entered one rider, each in the dressage event, through the establishments of final olympics ranking for Group B (South Western Europe).

=== Dressage ===
Athlete	Horse	Event	Grand Prix		Grand Prix Freestyle		Overall	
Athlete	Horse	Event	Score	Rank	Technical	Artistic	Score	Rank
Nicolas Wagner	Quater Back Junior FRH	Individual	71.988	24	Did not advance		71.988	24

Qualification Legend: Q = Qualified for the final based on position in group; q = Qualified for the final based on overall position

== Swimming ==
Luxembourg sent one swimmer to compete at the 2024 Paris Olympics.

Athlete	Event	Heat		Semifinal		Final	
Athlete	Event	Time	Rank	Time	Rank	Time	Rank
Ralph Daleiden	Men's 100 m freestyle	49.12	30	Did not advance			

== Table tennis ==
Luxembourg entered three table tennis players into Paris 2024. Luka Mladenovic, Ni Xia Lian, and Sarah De Nutte, qualified for the games by virtue of the top twelve ranked players, in their respective events, through the release of the final world ranking for Paris 2024.

Athlete	Event	Preliminary	Round 1	Round 2	Round 3	Quarterfinals	Semifinals	Final / BM		
Athlete	Event	Opposition Result	Opposition Result	Opposition Result	Opposition Result	Opposition Result	Opposition Result	Opposition Result	Opposition Result	Rank
Luka Mladenovic	Men's singles	Bye	Groth (DEN); L 0–4	Did not advance						
Ni Xia Lian	Women's singles	Bye	Altınkaya (TUR); W 4–2	Sun (CHN); L 0–4	Did not advance					
Sarah De Nutte	Women's singles	Bye	Shao (POR); L 2–4	Did not advance						

== Triathlon ==
Luxembourg entered one female triathlete in the triathlon events for Paris, following the release of final individual olympics qualification ranking.

Individual

Athlete	Event	Time						Rank
Athlete	Event	Swim (1.5 km)	Trans 1	Bike (40 km)	Trans 2	Run (10 km)	Total	Rank
Jeanne Lehair	Women's	23.36	00:54	DNF				
