= Luxembourg at the 1992 Summer Paralympics =

- IPC code: LUX
- NPC: Luxembourg Paralympic Committee
- Website: www.paralympics.lu

in Barcelona
- Competitors: 2
- Medals: Gold 0 Silver 0 Bronze 0 Total 0

Summer Paralympics appearances (overview)
- 1976; 1980; 1984; 1988; 1992; 1996; 2000–2004; 2008; 2012–2016; 2020; 2024

Luxembourg competed at the 1992 Summer Paralympics in Barcelona, Spain. Two competitors from Luxembourg won no medals and so did not place in the medal table.

== See also ==
- Luxembourg at the Paralympics
- Luxembourg at the 1992 Summer Olympics
