= Luxembourg at the 1980 Summer Paralympics =

- IPC code: LUX
- NPC: Luxembourg Paralympic Committee
- Website: www.paralympics.lu

in Arnhem
- Competitors: 9
- Medals Ranked 38th: Gold 0 Silver 0 Bronze 1 Total 1

Summer Paralympics appearances (overview)
- 1976; 1980; 1984; 1988; 1992; 1996; 2000–2004; 2008; 2012–2016; 2020; 2024

Luxembourg competed at the 1980 Summer Paralympics in Arnhem, Netherlands. 9 competitors from Luxembourg won a single bronze medal and finished joint 38th in the medal table with Greece and Malta.

== See also ==
- Luxembourg at the Paralympics
- Luxembourg at the 1980 Summer Olympics
