= Luxembourg at the 2000 Summer Olympics =

- IOC code: LUX
- NOC: Luxembourg Olympic and Sporting Committee
- Website: www.teamletzebuerg.lu (in French)

in Sydney
- Competitors: 6 in 4 sports
- Flag bearer: Lara Heinz
- Medals: Gold 0 Silver 0 Bronze 0 Total 0

Summer Olympics appearances (overview)
- 1900; 1904–1908; 1912; 1920; 1924; 1928; 1932; 1936; 1948; 1952; 1956; 1960; 1964; 1968; 1972; 1976; 1980; 1984; 1988; 1992; 1996; 2000; 2004; 2008; 2012; 2016; 2020; 2024

Luxembourg was represented at the 2000 Summer Olympics in Sydney, Australia by the Luxembourg Olympic and Sporting Committee.

In total, six athletes represented Luxembourg in four different sports including swimming, table tennis, tennis and triathlon.

== Swimming ==
Three Luxembourger athletes participated in the swimming events – Alwin de Prins in the men's 100 m breaststroke, Luc Decker in the men's 100 m butterfly and Lara Heinz in both the women's 50 m and 100 m freestyle.

The heats for the men's 100 m breaststroke took place on 16 September 2000 at 4:45 pm. De Prins contested heat five and started in lane three. He finished third in his heat in a time of 1 minutes 4.37 seconds which was ultimately not fast enough to qualify for the semi-finals.

The heats for the women's 100 m freestyle took place on 20 September 2000 at 3:02 pm. Heinz contested heat three and started in lane two. She finished fourth in her heat in a time of 58.55 seconds which was ultimately not fast enough to qualify for the semi-finals.

The heats for the men's 100 m butterfly took place a day later on 21 September 2000 at 4:22 pm. Decker contested heat three and started in lane six. He finished fourth in his heat in a time of 56.1 seconds which was ultimately not fast enough to qualify for the semi-finals.

The heats for the women's 50 m freestyle took place a day later on 22 September 2000 at 3:02 pm. Heinz contested heat six and started in lane five. She finished fifth in her heat in a time of 26.55 seconds which was ultimately not fast enough to qualify for the semi-finals.

Men

Athlete	Event	Heat		Semifinal		Final	
Athlete	Event	Time	Rank	Time	Rank	Time	Rank
Alwin de Prins	100 m breaststroke	1:04.37	39	Did not advance			
Luc Decker	100 m butterfly	56.10	47	Did not advance			

Women

Athlete	Event	Heat		Semifinal		Final	
Athlete	Event	Time	Rank	Time	Rank	Time	Rank
Lara Heinz	50 m freestyle	26.55	34	Did not advance			
Lara Heinz	100 m freestyle	58.55	37	Did not advance			

== Table tennis ==
Two Luxembourger athletes participated in the table tennis events – Ni Xialian in both the women's singles and women's doubles and Peggy Regenwetter who partnered Ni in the women's doubles.

Ni and Regenswetter received a bye in the group stage for the women's doubles. The first round took place on 19 September 2000 and Ni and Regenwetter lost 16–21, 21–13, 19–21, 21–18, 21–13 to Miao Miao and Shirley Zhou of Australia.

Ni received a bye in the group stage for the women's singles. Round one took place on 20 September 2000 and Ni defeated Csilla Bátorfi of Hungary 24–22, 21–10, 19–21, 21–23, 21–14. Round two took place the following day but Ni lost 21–15, 21–11, 21–15 to Li Ju of China.

Athlete	Event	Group Stage			Round of 32	Round of 16	Quarterfinals	Semifinals	Final / BM	
Athlete	Event	Opposition Result	Opposition Result	Opposition Result	Opposition Result	Opposition Result	Opposition Result	Opposition Result	Opposition Result	Rank
Ni Xialian	Women's singles	BYE			Bátorfi (HUN); W 3–2	Li J (CHN); L 0–3	Did not advance			
Ni Xialian; Peggy Regenwetter	Women's doubles	BYE			Miao / Zhou (AUS); L 2–3	Did not advance				

== Tennis ==
One Luxembourger athlete participated in the tennis events – Anne Kremer in the women's singles.

The first round of the women's singles took place on 20 September 2000. Kremer defeated Iva Majoli in straight sets – 6–2, 6–4. The second round took place the following day and Kremer lost in three sets to seventh seed Amanda Coetzer of South Africa, 4–6 6–3, 6–4.

Athlete	Event	Round of 64	Round of 32	Round of 16	Quarterfinals	Semifinals	Final / BM	
Athlete	Event	Opposition Score	Opposition Score	Opposition Score	Opposition Score	Opposition Score	Opposition Score	Rank
Anne Kremer	Women's singles	Majoli (CRO); W 6–2, 6–4	Coetzer (RSA); L 6–4, 3–6, 4–6	Did not advance				

== Triathlon ==
One Luxembourger athlete participated in the triathlon events – Nancy Kemp-Arendt in the women's race.

The women's triathlon took place on 16 September 2000 at 10 am. Kemp-Arendt completed the race in a time of 2 hours, 3 minutes and 14.94 seconds to finish 10th overall.

Athlete	Event	Swim (1.5 km)	Trans 1	Bike (40 km)	Trans 2	Run (10 km)	Total Time	Rank
Nancy Kemp-Arendt	Women's	19:15.18	27.60	1:05:17	26.30	37:48.86	2:03:14.94	10
