= Luxembourg at the 1900 Summer Olympics =

- IOC code: LUX
- NOC: Fédération des sociétés luxembourgeoises de sports athlétiques

in Paris
- Competitors: 1 in 1 sport
- Medals: Gold 0 Silver 0 Bronze 0 Total 0

Summer Olympics appearances (overview)
- ~~1900~~; 1904–1908; 1912; 1920; 1924; 1928; 1932; 1936; 1948; 1952; 1956; 1960; 1964; 1968; 1972; 1976; 1980; 1984; 1988; 1992; 1996; 2000; 2004; 2008; 2012; 2016; 2020; 2024; 2028

Luxembourg did not send a team to the 1900 Summer Olympics in Paris. However, Luxembourgish-born Michel Théato competed for the French club, Club Amical et Sportif de Saint-Mandékn, and won the men's marathon at the 1900 Summer Olympics. Although Théato moved to Paris and lived there until his death in 1923, there is no record that he ever filed for French citizenship. Nevertheless, as he represented a French club, his participation and gold medal are credited to France by the International Olympic Committee (IOC).

== Disputed country attribution ==
For a long time, it was assumed that Théato was French, and only in the late 20th century was it discovered that he was really from Luxembourg, making him the first Olympic medalist for the nation although his nationality is disputed.

From 2021 to 2024, the IOC briefly attributed medals in individual events according to the athlete's nationality, even when the athlete represented a foreign club or team, crediting the gold medal of Théato to Luxembourg as well. Since 2024, participation and medals have instead been attributed according to the national affiliation of the club or team for which an athlete competed to be the decisive factor for the first three Olympic Games (1896–1904), attributing participation and medals accordingly. In the case of Théato, his medal is attributed to France, as he compteted for a French club. His case is one of several early Olympic examples in which medal attribution follows club representation instead of the athlete's citizenship.

== Athletics ==
Théato competed in the marathon event of the athletics program, which he won.

| Athlete | Events | Final | |
| Athlete | Events | Result | Rank |
|---|---|---|---|
| Michel Théato | marathon | 2-59:45.0 | (gold) |
