= Luxembourg at the 1976 Summer Olympics =

- IOC code: LUX
- NOC: Luxembourg Olympic and Sporting Committee

in Montreal
- Competitors: 8 in 4 sports
- Flag bearer: Robert Schiel
- Medals: Gold 0 Silver 0 Bronze 0 Total 0

Summer Olympics appearances (overview)
- 1900; 1904–1908; 1912; 1920; 1924; 1928; 1932; 1936; 1948; 1952; 1956; 1960; 1964; 1968; 1972; 1976; 1980; 1984; 1988; 1992; 1996; 2000; 2004; 2008; 2012; 2016; 2020; 2024

Luxembourg competed at the 1976 Summer Olympics in Montreal, Quebec, Canada. Eight competitors, all men, took part in seven events in four sports.

== Athletics ==
Men's High Jump

- Marc Romersa

- Qualification – 2.05m (→ did not advance)

Men's 20 km Race Walk

- Lucien Faber – 1:36:21 (→ 28th place)

== Cycling ==
Two cyclists represented Luxembourg in 1976.

Individual road race

- Lucien Didier – did not finish (→ no ranking)
- Marcel Thull – did not finish (→ no ranking)

== Fencing ==
Two fencers represented Luxembourg in 1976.

Men's épée

- Roger Menghi
- Robert Schiel
