= Luxembourg at the 2012 Summer Olympics =

- IOC code: LUX
- NOC: Luxembourg Olympic and Sporting Committee
- Website: www.teamletzebuerg.lu (in French)

in London
- Competitors: 9 in 7 sports
- Flag bearers: Marie Müller (opening); Laurent Carnol (closing)
- Medals: Gold 0 Silver 0 Bronze 0 Total 0

Summer Olympics appearances (overview)
- 1900; 1904–1908; 1912; 1920; 1924; 1928; 1932; 1936; 1948; 1952; 1956; 1960; 1964; 1968; 1972; 1976; 1980; 1984; 1988; 1992; 1996; 2000; 2004; 2008; 2012; 2016; 2020; 2024

Luxembourg competed at the 2012 Summer Olympics in London, from 27 July to 12 August 2012. The Luxembourg Olympic and Sporting Committee sent a delegation of nine athletes to the event—five men and four women—who competed in 7 sports.

Originally, Luxembourg's delegation consisted of the Schleck brothers, who were meant to participate in road cycling. However, they both had to withdraw from the event after injury and a failed drugs test. Five athletes had previously competed in the Olympic Games for Luxembourg, including swimmers Laurent Carnol and Raphaël Stacchiotti in 2008. Ni Xialian competed at her third Olympics.

Luxembourg's delegation failed to win an Olympic medal in London. Judoka Marie Müller, who became Luxembourg's flag bearer at the opening ceremony, came close but was unable to obtain the nation's first Summer Olympic medal in 60 years (in 20 years including the two Winter Olympic medals), after losing out to Italy's Rosalba Forciniti during the bronze medal match.

== Preparations ==
Five months before the 2012 Summer Olympics began, the Luxembourgish Olympic and Sporting Committee (COSL) was struck by the resignation of Deputy Head of Delegation and Chairman of the Technical Office Fernand Guth, after a disagreement with Head of Delegation Heinz Thews. A few days later, President of the COSL Marc Theisen announced his resignation from his position after his law firm was threatened with prosecution by Luxembourg tax authorities.

The Luxembourg delegation consisted of nine athletes competing in seven different sports, with Heinz Thews serving as Head of Delegation. For the first time, the nation did not compete in the triathlon, and unlike in 2008, Luxembourg did not send athletes to the sailing or gymnastics. Luxembourg was not represented in the athletics or fencing, unlike in 2004 and 1996, respectively.

André Hoffmann was elected as President of the COSL to replace Marc Theisen. Hoffmann did not speak of a medal target, but said that a medal would be a bonus Luxembourg would not refuse. Despite the nation not winning a medal since 1952 with Josy Barthel, who achieved gold in the men's 1500 metres.

Eight of the nine Luxembourg athletes stayed in the Olympic Village. They shared four apartments in Block E, which also hosted the German delegation. Only tennis player Gilles Müller chose to stay elsewhere — he chose a hotel near the All England Lawn Tennis and Croquet Club, the site of the tennis events.

== Archery ==
Jeff Henckels, aged 27, was the only representative of archery for Luxembourg in the 2012 Summer Olympics, after previously competing in the 2004 Games, where he finished in 56th overall position.

=== Qualification ===
The Olympic Games involve 64 athletes in each event. The top archers qualified by participating in the 2011 World Archery Championships, and achieving a high score. The places in the Olympic Games, except three of them which are invitations from the Tripartite Commission composed of the International Olympic Committee, the Association of National Olympic Committees, and the World Archery Federation, are distributed according to the results. By reaching the quarterfinals of the 2011 World Championships, Henckels qualified for the 2012 London Olympics.

=== Results ===
On 27 July, Henckels achieved a score of 654 in the preliminary round, placing him in forty-ninth position. In the following round, he was against Dutch archer Rick van der Ven. Van der Ven won the first set, tied with Henckels in the set, won the third, and tied in the last set, leaving a score of Henckels 2 — 6 Van der Ven.

Athlete	Event	Ranking round		Round of 64	Round of 32	Round of 16	Quarterfinals	Semifinals	Final / BM	
Athlete	Event	Score	Seed	Opposition Score	Opposition Score	Opposition Score	Opposition Score	Opposition Score	Opposition Score	Rank
Jeff Henckels	Men's individual	654	49	van der Ven (NED) (16); L 2–6	Did not advance					

== Cycling ==
Laurent Didier was 28 at the time of the Olympics, and the 2012 Games were his first time at the Olympics. After becoming professional in 2006, he became a member of the 2012 Trek Factory Racing team. He has participated in several editions of the UCI Road World Championships, and finished in 98th position in 2010. He also achieved gold in the 2012 Luxembourgish National Road Race Championships.

Christine Majerus, aged 25, also made her Olympics debut in 2012. Since the introduction of women's cycling at the 1984 Summer Olympics, she was the first female to participate in the sport from Luxembourg. She won the female Luxembourgish National Road Race Championships in 2010, 2011, and 2012.

=== Qualification ===
Road cycling places in the Olympics are allocating according to the performance of National Olympic Committees, not just athletes. For male racers, quotas are allocated based on the nation's ranking in the 2011 Road World Championships (UCI World Tour) — the top ten countries received five quotas, and the following five received four. The World Championship ranking was calculated by adding up the points if the top five riders per country. However, if a country achieved its ranking with a low number of athletes, the number of athletes participating in the Olympics cannot go above that.

Luxembourg achieved ninth place in the 2011 UCI World Tour, but only qualified two men for the road cycling, based on the points of brothers Andy and Fränk Schleck. The Schleck brothers were initially planned to represent the country, but Andy withdrew after an injury, and was replaced by Laurent. Fränk was unable to participate after testing positive for a substance during a diuretic urine test for drugs in the Tour de France, and was not replaced.

For the female road cycling, the fifteen highest-ranking nations in the 2012 UCI World Tour qualified an athlete. Christine Majerus was qualified in June 2012.

=== Results ===
The 2012 men's road race took place on 28 July 2012 and was over a distance of 250 km (160 mi). Didier took 5 hours, 46 minutes, and 37 seconds to complete the race, and finished in 64th position. The women's road race took place the following day, and it was planned for Majerus to finish in the top twenty. The race was over 140 km (87 mi), and Majerus finished after 3 hours, 35 minutes, and 56 seconds, in twenty-first position.

Athlete	Event	Time	Rank
Laurent Didier	Men's road race	5:46:37	64
Christine Majerus	Women's road race	3:35:56	21

== Judo ==
Luxembourg's delegation for the judo event consisted of Marie Muller, who also participated in the 2008 Summer Olympics. She was elected as the Luxembourg Sportswoman of the Year in 2008 and 2010.

=== Qualification ===
There are 14 categories in Olympic judo competitions — seven for each gender. 252 places were allocated for the athletes, and the athletes' rankings given by the International Judo Federation was the basis for their qualification in the event. 25 places were allocated to the European continent, and despite not being in the top 252, Muller qualified as she was in the top 25 in Europe.

=== Results ===
Muller participated in the 52 kg event, which took place on 29 July 2012, her birthday. In the first round, the Luxembourgish judoka confronted Spanish Ana Carrascosa. Muller won this fight with two waza-ari, with the last being on Tani otoshi. In the second round, Muller beat Dominican judoka María García. However, she lost the quarter-finals to Cuban athlete Yanet Bermoy. In the first repechage, she beat Christianne Legentil with a Uchi mata. However, she lost to Italian Rosalba Forciniti in the second repechage, so was unable to achieve a bronze medal.

Athlete	Event	Round of 32	Round of 16	Quarterfinals	Semifinals	Repechage	Final / BM	
Athlete	Event	Opposition Result	Opposition Result	Opposition Result	Opposition Result	Opposition Result	Opposition Result	Rank
Marie Müller	Women's −52 kg	Carrascosa (ESP); W 0201–0000	García (DOM); W 1011–0002	Bermoy (CUB); L 0002–0011	Did not advance	Legentil (MRI); W 0101–0002	Forciniti (ITA); L 0001–0000	5

== Shooting ==
Luxembourg's delegation to the shooting event consisted of athlete Carole Calmes. Aged 33, the 2012 Games were her first Olympics, although she intended to participate in 2008.

=== Qualification ===
The qualification system sought to allocate 390 athletes overall for all five shooting events, with a maximum of 28 per country. Athletes were required to achieve a minimum score in the 2010 or 2011 ISSF World Shooting Championships, before their National Olympic Committee could appoint them to a team. Calmes was chosen by the COSL.

=== Results ===
Calmes participated in the 10 metre air rifle event on 28 July. With a score of 390 points, placing her in forty-eighth position, Calmes was unable to advance to the final.

Athlete	Event	Qualification		Final	
Athlete	Event	Points	Rank	Points	Rank
Carole Calmes	10 m air rifle	390	48	Did not advance	

== Swimming ==
Luxembourg's delegation for swimming consisted of Laurent Carnol and Raphaël Stacchiotti. Carnol, aged 22, competed in London in his second Olympic games in the 100 and 200 metre breaststroke events, after finishing in 40th position in the 200 metres breaststroke in 2008. Stacchiotti, aged 20, was present in the 200 and 400 metre individual medleys, after finishing in 49th place in the 200 metres freestyle in the 2008 Summer Olympics.

=== Qualification ===
A country was allowed to enter two athletes in each swimming event, providing that they each passed the Olympic qualifying time (OQT) set by the International Swimming Federation (FINA). FINA also had another qualification method, the Olympic selection time (OST). A country was able to send two swimmers in each event meeting the OQT, and one in each event meeting the OST.

=== Results ===
Carnol participated in the 100 metre breaststroke on 28 July 2012. In the heat, he achieved a time of 1 minute and 1.46 seconds, placing him in twenty-sixth position, meaning that he was unable to advance in the event. In the 200 metre breaststroke, he achieved a time of 2 minutes 10.83 seconds, placing him in twelfth position, meaning that he could participate in the semi-finals. However, with a time of 2 minutes 11.17 seconds placing him in fifteenth position, he was unable to advance to the final.

Stacchiotti also began the competition on 28 July, with the 400 metre individual medley. He finished with a time of 4 minutes, 17.2 seconds, placing him in eighteenth position, meaning that he was unable to advance. In the 200 metre individual medley, four days later, he posted a time of 2 minutes 0.38 seconds, placing him in seventeenth position, making him unable to advance to the later rounds.

Athlete	Event	Heat		Semifinal		Final	
Athlete	Event	Time	Rank	Time	Rank	Time	Rank
Laurent Carnol	100 m breaststroke	1:01.46	26	Did not advance			
Laurent Carnol	200 m breaststroke	2:10.83	12 Q	2:11.17	15	Did not advance	
Raphaël Stacchiotti	200 m individual medley	2:00.38	17	Did not advance			
Raphaël Stacchiotti	400 m individual medley	4:17.20 NR	18	—N/a		Did not advance	

== Table tennis ==
Luxembourg's delegation to the table tennis consisted of Ni Xialian, who had previously participated in the 2000 and 2008 Olympic games.

=== Qualification ===
The qualifications process for table tennis began at the end of the 2011 World Table Tennis Championships. The top 28 players, and the highest-ranked players in the world after the Championships, were directly qualified into their events at the Olympics, with a limit of two athletes per country. Places were also awarded by achievements in six continental tournaments between June 2011 and April 2012, and a May 2012 international tournament awarded a place in the Olympics to the two highest-ranked players of each gender. A final quota is allocated by invitation of the International Table Tennis Federation. Ni Xialian was forty-fourth in the world after the 2011 World Championships, but was later awarded a place.

=== Results ===
Ni Xialian entered in the second round of the women's singles, and was against Ariel Hsing from the United States, ranked 115th in the world. Hsing won the first, lost the second, won the third, won the fourth, lost the fifth, but won the last set, and Ni Xialian was unable to advance to the next round.

Athlete	Event	Preliminary round	Round 1	Round 2	Round 3	Round 4	Quarterfinals	Semifinals	Final / BM	
Athlete	Event	Opposition Result	Opposition Result	Opposition Result	Opposition Result	Opposition Result	Opposition Result	Opposition Result	Opposition Result	Rank
Ni Xialian	Women's singles	Bye		Hsing (USA); L 2–4	Did not advance					

== Tennis ==
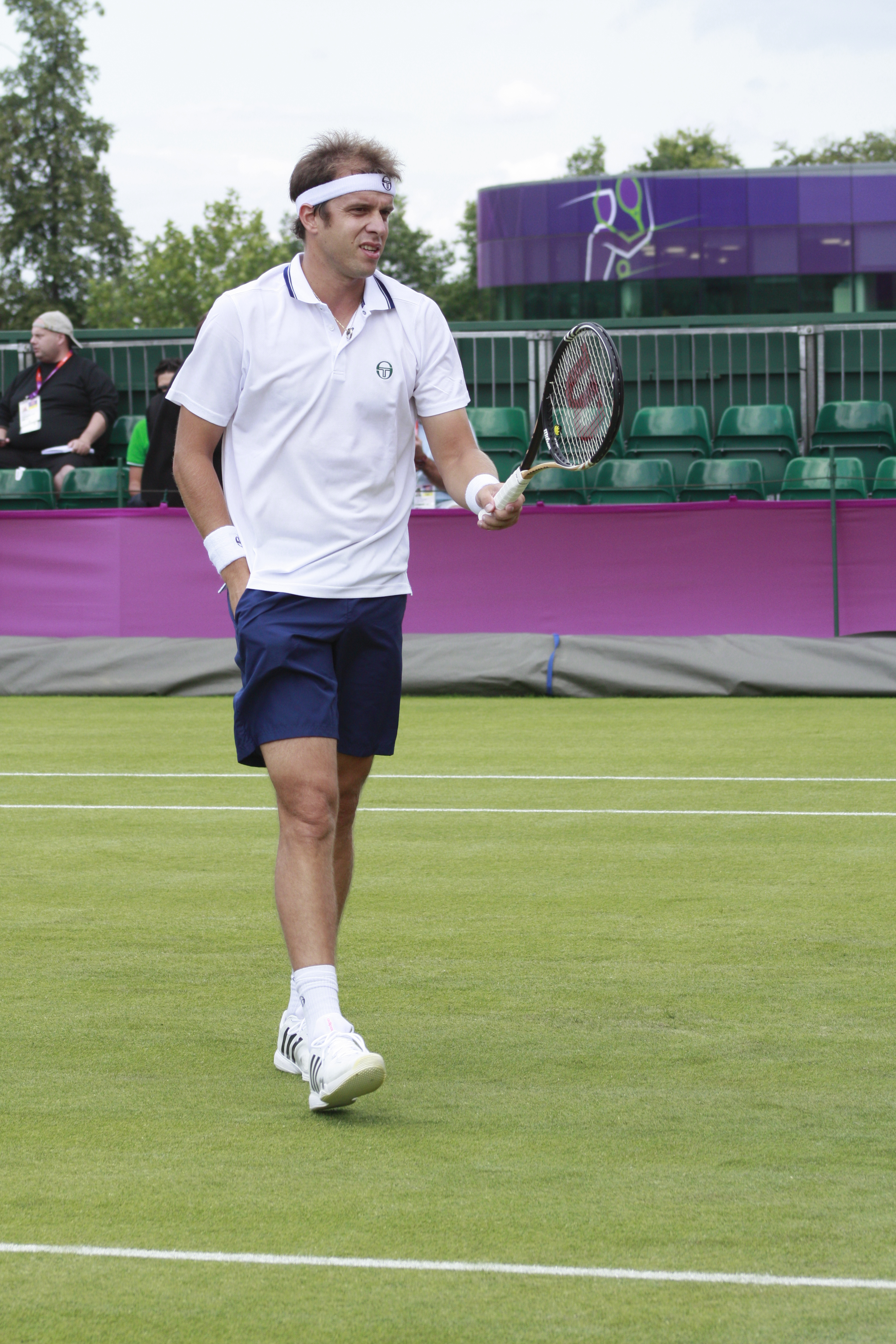
Gilles Müller in men's tennis singles.

Gilles Müller, aged 28, was the sole representative of Luxembourg in the tennis. The 2012 Summer Olympics were his first games.

=== Qualification ===
Sixty-four male and female players were allowed to participate in the tennis event at the 2012 Olympics. Fifty-six of these places for each gender were allocated in order of the players' ATP ranking on 11 June 2012, to a maximum of four players from each country, six places for each gender were allocated by the International Tennis Federation, and the final two for each gender were assigned by a tripartite commission consisting of the International Olympic Committee, the Association of National Olympic Committees, and the ITF. On 11 June 2012, Müller's ATP ranking was 53, and was automatically qualified.

=== Results ===
In the first round, Müller was against Romanian Adrian Ungur. Müller won the first set 6–3, and also won the second set 6–3, and advanced to the second round. In the second round, he confronted Denis Istomin of Uzbekistan. Müller won the first set with a tie break, but lost the following two sets, and was unable to advance in the competition.

Athlete	Event	Round of 64	Round of 32	Round of 16	Quarterfinals	Semifinals	Final / BM	
Athlete	Event	Opposition Score	Opposition Score	Opposition Score	Opposition Score	Opposition Score	Opposition Score	Rank
Gilles Müller	Men's singles	Ungur (ROU); W 6–3, 6–3	Istomin (UZB); L 7–6^{(7–4)}, 6–7^{(3–7)}, 5–7	Did not advance				

== See also ==
- Luxembourg at the 2012 Winter Youth Olympics
