= Luxembourg at the 1984 Summer Paralympics =

- IPC code: LUX
- NPC: Luxembourg Paralympic Committee
- Website: www.paralympics.lu

in Stoke Mandeville/New York
- Competitors: 5
- Medals Ranked 30th: Gold 1 Silver 4 Bronze 1 Total 6

Summer Paralympics appearances (overview)
- 1976; 1980; 1984; 1988; 1992; 1996; 2000–2004; 2008; 2012–2016; 2020; 2024

Luxembourg competed at the 1984 Summer Paralympics in Stoke Mandeville, Great Britain and New York City, United States. 5 competitors from Luxembourg won 6 medals including 1 gold, 4 silver and 1 bronze and finished 30th in the medal table.

== See also ==
- Luxembourg at the Paralympics
- Luxembourg at the 1984 Summer Olympics
