= Luxembourg at the 2004 Summer Olympics =

- IOC code: LUX
- NOC: Luxembourg Olympic and Sporting Committee
- Website: www.teamletzebuerg.lu (in French)

in Athens
- Competitors: 10 in 6 sports
- Flag bearer: Claudine Schaul
- Medals: Gold 0 Silver 0 Bronze 0 Total 0

Summer Olympics appearances (overview)
- 1900; 1904–1908; 1912; 1920; 1924; 1928; 1932; 1936; 1948; 1952; 1956; 1960; 1964; 1968; 1972; 1976; 1980; 1984; 1988; 1992; 1996; 2000; 2004; 2008; 2012; 2016; 2020; 2024

Luxembourg competed at the 2004 Summer Olympics in Athens, Greece, from 13 to 29 August 2004. The nation has competed at every Olympic games for a century, except the 1932 Summer Olympics in Los Angeles.

Luxembourgian Olympic and Sporting Committee sent the nation's largest delegation to the Games since the 1972 Summer Olympics in Munich. A total of 10 athletes, 6 men and 4 women, competed in 6 sports; most of them participated strongly in road cycling, swimming, and tennis. Notable Luxembourgish athletes featured road cyclist Fränk Schleck, triathlete Elizabeth May, and tennis star Claudine Schaul, who later became the nation's flag bearer in the opening ceremony.

Luxembourg failed to win an Olympic medal in Athens since the 1952 Summer Olympics in Helsinki, where middle-distance runner Josy Barthel took home the Olympic title in the men's 1500 metres.

== Archery ==
One Luxembourgish archer qualifiedfor the men's individual archery.

Athlete	Event	Ranking round		Round of 64	Round of 32	Round of 16	Quarterfinals	Semifinals	Final / BM	
Athlete	Event	Score	Seed	Opposition Score	Opposition Score	Opposition Score	Opposition Score	Opposition Score	Opposition Score	Rank
Jeff Henckels	Men's individual	623	55	Chen S-Y (TPE); L 132–136	Did not advance					

== Athletics ==
Luxembourgish athletes have so far achieved qualifying standards in the following athletics events (up to a maximum of 3 athletes in each event at the 'A' Standard, and 1 at the 'B' Standard).

Key

- Note–Ranks given for track events are within the athlete's heat only
- Q = Qualified for the next round
- q = Qualified for the next round as a fastest loser or, in field events, by position without achieving the qualifying target
- NR = National record
- N/A = Round not applicable for the event
- Bye = Athlete not required to compete in round

Men

Athlete	Event	Heat		Semifinal		Final	
Athlete	Event	Result	Rank	Result	Rank	Result	Rank
David Fiegen	800 m	1:46.97	5	Did not advance			

== Cycling ==
=== Road ===
In the men's road race, Kirchen and Schleck finished in the main peloton of 34 riders, with Kirchen finishing 3rd in that group and 6th overall. Benoît Joachim was the only entrant in the time trial, but finished well back.

Athlete	Event	Time	Rank
Benoît Joachim	Men's road race	5:44:13	45
Benoît Joachim	Men's time trial	1:01:50	26
Kim Kirchen	Men's road race	5:41:56	6
Fränk Schleck	Men's road race	5:41:56	16

== Swimming ==
Luxembourgish swimmers earned qualifying standards in the following events (up to a maximum of 2 swimmers in each event at the A-standard time, and 1 at the B-standard time):

Men

Athlete	Event	Heat		Semifinal		Final	
Athlete	Event	Time	Rank	Time	Rank	Time	Rank
Alwin de Prins	100 m breaststroke	1:03.32	27	Did not advance			

Women

Athlete	Event	Heat		Semifinal		Final	
Athlete	Event	Time	Rank	Time	Rank	Time	Rank
Lara Heinz	50 m freestyle	26.35	30	Did not advance			
Lara Heinz	100 m freestyle	57.40	36	Did not advance			

== Tennis ==
Anne Kremer and Claudine Schaul both lost their single matches in straight sets to higher ranking opponents, then paired up as a double team, and lost an upset to a wildcard entry from Colombia in three sets, including a tiebreak set and a 16-game final set.

Athlete	Event	Round of 64	Round of 32	Round of 16	Quarterfinals	Semifinals	Final / BM	
Athlete	Event	Opposition Score	Opposition Score	Opposition Score	Opposition Score	Opposition Score	Opposition Score	Rank
Anne Kremer	Women's singles	Vento-Kabchi (VEN); L 3–6, 4–6	Did not advance					
Claudine Schaul	Women's singles	Hantuchová (SVK); L 1–6, 1–6	Did not advance					
Anne Kremer; Claudine Schaul	Women's doubles	—	Castaño / Zuluaga (COL); L 6–7^{(7–9)}, 6–2, 7–9	Did not advance				

== Triathlon ==
Luxembourg again sent one triathlete to the Olympics.

Athlete	Event	Swim (1.5 km)	Trans 1	Bike (40 km)	Trans 2	Run (10 km)	Total Time	Rank
Elizabeth May	Women's	19:43	0:19	1:10:26	0:22	37:39	2:08:29.22	17
