= Luxembourg at the 2008 Summer Paralympics =

- IPC code: LUX
- NPC: Luxembourg Paralympic Committee
- Website: www.paralympics.lu

in Beijing
- Competitors: 1 in 1 sport
- Flag bearers: Peter Lorkowski (opening) none (closing)
- Medals Ranked -th: Gold 0 Silver 0 Bronze 0 Total 0

Summer Paralympics appearances (overview)
- 1976; 1980; 1984; 1988; 1992; 1996; 2000–2004; 2008; 2012–2016; 2020; 2024

Luxembourg sent a delegation to compete at the 2008 Summer Paralympics in Beijing, People's Republic of China. According to official records, the country's only athlete competed in cycling.

== Cycling ==
Men

Athlete	Class	Event	Time	Class Factor	Factorized Time	Rank
Peter Lorkowski	HC C	Road time trial	25:05.34 (+ 4:48.82)	-	-	10
Peter Lorkowski	HC C	Road race	1:34:04 (+ 12:24)	-	-	9

== See also ==
- Luxembourg at the Paralympics
- Luxembourg at the 2008 Summer Olympics
