= Marcel Langsam =

Luxembourgish artistic gymnast (1891–1979)

- Born: 26 October 1891 Luxembourg City, Luxembourg
- Died: 21 November 1979 (aged 88) Luxembourg City, Luxembourg

Gymnastics career
- Discipline: Men's artistic gymnastics
- Country represented: Luxembourg

Marcel Langsam (26 October 1891 – 21 November 1979) was a Luxembourgish gymnast who competed in the 1912 Summer Olympics. In 1912, he was a member of the Luxembourgish team, which finished fourth in the team, European system competition and fifth in the team, free system event.
