= Luxembourg at the Paralympics =

- IPC code: LUX
- NPC: Luxembourg Paralympic Committee
- Website: www.paralympics.lu
- Medals: Gold 1 Silver 4 Bronze 3 Total 8

Summer appearances
- 1976; 1980; 1984; 1988; 1992; 1996; 2000–2004; 2008; 2012–2016; 2020; 2024

Luxembourg made its Paralympic Games début at the 1976 Summer Paralympics in Toronto, with two competitors in archery and one in swimming. It competed again in 1980, where Marco Schmit won the country's first medal (a bronze in the men's 100m sprint, category E1); and in 1984, its most successful year, where Luxembourgers won a gold medal, four silver and a bronze. The country then missed the 1988 Summer Games, returning with a two-man delegation (in archery and swimming) in 1992. Luxembourg was represented by a single competitor in archery in 1996, and was absent at the 2000 and 2004 Games, returning in 2008 with a single competitor in road cycling.

Luxembourg has never taken part in the Winter Paralympics.

== List of medallists ==
| Medal | Name | Games | Sport | Event |
|---|---|---|---|---|
| Gold | Henri Kaudé | 1984 Stoke Mandeville / New York | Swimming | Men's 25m Backstroke C6 |
| Silver | Henri Kaudé | 1984 Stoke Mandeville / New York | Swimming | Men's 25m Freestyle C6 |
| Silver | Henri Kaudé | 1984 Stoke Mandeville / New York | Swimming | Men's 50m Freestyle C6 |
| Silver | Mathias Bingen | 1984 Stoke Mandeville / New York | Athletics | Men's 100m L5 |
| Silver | Mathias Bingen | 1984 Stoke Mandeville / New York | Athletics | Men's Javelin L5 |
| Bronze | Marco Schmit | 1980 Arnhem | Athletics | Men's 100 m E1 |
| Bronze | Marcel Kockelmann | 1984 Stoke Mandeville / New York | Weightlifting | Men's up to 75 kg integrated |
| Bronze | Tom Habscheid | 2024 Paris | Athletics | Men's shot put F63 |

== See also ==
- Luxembourg at the Olympics
