= Jos Zuang =

Luxembourgish gymnast (1891–1962)

- Full name: Joseph Zuang
- Born: 15 March 1891 Luxembourg City, Luxembourg
- Died: 10 December 1962 (aged 71) Luxembourg City, Luxembourg

Gymnastics career
- Discipline: Men's artistic gymnastics
- Country represented: Luxembourg

Joseph Zuang (15 March 1891 – 10 December 1962) was a Luxembourgish gymnast who competed in the 1912 Summer Olympics. He was born in Luxembourg City. In 1912, he was a member of the Luxembourgish team, which finished fourth in the team, European system competition and fifth in the team, free system event.
