= François Wagner =

Luxembourgish gymnast

- Born: 16 November 1890 Luxembourg City, Luxembourg

Gymnastics career
- Discipline: Men's artistic gymnastics
- Country represented: Luxembourg

François Wagner (born 16 November 1890; date of death unknown) was a Luxembourgish gymnast who competed in the 1912 Summer Olympics. In 1912, he was a member of the Luxembourgish team, which finished fourth in the team, European system competition and fifth in the team, free system event.
