= Norbert Sinner =

Luxembourgish cyclist

Personal information
- Born: 5 April 1907 Leudelange, Luxembourg
- Died: 9 November 1945 (aged 38) Luxembourg City, Luxembourg
- Criminal information
- Status: Executed by firing squad
- Conviction: Treason
- Penalty: Death

Sport
- Country: Luxembourg
- Sport: Cycling
- Event: 1928 Summer Olympics

Norbert Sinner (5 April 1907 – 9 November 1945) was a Luxembourgish cyclist.

== Life ==
He competed in the individual and team road race events at the 1928 Summer Olympics. During the German occupation of Luxembourg during World War II, Sinner worked as an oil wholesaler, and supported the Nazis during the invasion. He was one of the first members of the pro-Nazi Volksdeutsche Bewegung in Luxembourg, and in October 1940 he became Ortsgruppenleiter of Haute. After the war ended, he was executed for his collaboration with the Nazis.
