= Gust Lamesch =

Luxembourgish fencer (born 1911)

Personal information
- Born: Gustave Guillaume Lamesch; 23 June 1911

Sport
- Sport: Fencing

Gustave Guillaume Lamesch (born 23 June 1911, date of death unknown) was a Luxembourgish fencer. He competed in the individual foil and team épée events at the 1948 Summer Olympics.
