= Michel Hemmerling =

Luxembourgish artistic gymnast (1889–1962)

- Born: 9 January 1889 Luxembourg City, Luxembourg
- Died: 22 September 1962 (aged 73) Luxembourg City, Luxembourg

Gymnastics career
- Discipline: Men's artistic gymnastics
- Country represented: Luxembourg

Michel Hemmerling (9 January 1889 – 22 September 1962) was a Luxembourgish gymnast who competed in the 1912 Summer Olympics. He was born in Luxembourg City.

In 1912, he was a member of the Luxembourgish team, which finished fourth in the team, European system competition and fifth in the team, free system event.
