= René Andring =

Luxembourgish cyclist (born 1939)

Personal information
- Born: 11 September 1939 (age 87) Bertrange, Luxembourg

Cycling career
- Sport: Cycling

René Andring (born 11 September 1939) is a former Luxembourgish cyclist. He competed in the individual road race and team time trial events at the 1960 Summer Olympics.
