= Marc Schmit =

Luxembourgish sailor

Personal information
- Nationality: Luxembourg
- Born: 13 July 1985 (age 40) Luxembourg City, Luxembourg
- Height: 1.93 m (6 ft 4 in)
- Weight: 78 kg (172 lb)

Sailing career
- Sport: Sailing
- Class: Laser

Marc Schmit (born 13 July 1985) is a Laser sailor from Luxembourg. He competed at the 2008 Summer Olympics in Beijing, where he finished forty-second in the Laser class, with a score of 227 points.

Schmit achieved his best results in Laser sailing, when he finished twelfth at the 2006 Laser Europa Cup in Warnemünde, Germany. He is also a member of Yacht Club du G-D de Luxembourg.
