= Nicolas Kummer =

Luxembourgish artistic gymnast (1882–1954)

Nic Kummer
- Full name: Nicolas Kummer
- Born: 4 August 1882 Esch-sur-Alzette, Luxembourg
- Died: 6 September 1954 (aged 72) Luxembourg City, Luxembourg

Gymnastics career
- Discipline: Men's artistic gymnastics
- Country represented: Luxembourg

Nicolas Kummer (4 August 1882 – 6 September 1954) was a Luxembourgish gymnast who competed in the 1912 Summer Olympics. In 1912, he was a member of the Luxembourgish team, which finished fourth in the team, European system competition and fifth in the team, free system event.
