= Nelly Wies-Weyrich =

Luxembourgish archer (1933–2019)

Nelly Wies-Weyrich (10 May 1933 – 5 July 2019) was a Luxembourgish archer. She was born in Luxembourg, and represented the club Flèche d'Or. She competed in archery at the 1972 Summer Olympics in Munich, where she placed 24th in the women's individual contest.
