= Roby Schaeffer =

Luxembourgish sprinter

Personal information
- Nationality: Luxembourgish
- Born: 7 November 1930
- Died: 23 April 2014 (aged 83)

Sport
- Sport: Sprinting
- Event: 200 metres

Roby Schaeffer (7 November 1930 – 23 April 2014) was a Luxembourgish sprinter. He competed in the men's 200 metres at the 1952 Summer Olympics.
