= Jean Alfonsetti =

Luxembourgish cyclist (1908–1984)

Personal information
- Born: 10 January 1908 Dalheim, Luxembourg
- Died: 2 July 1984 (aged 76) Dalheim, Luxembourg

Cycling career
- Sport: Cycling

Jean Alfonsetti (10 January 1908 – 2 July 1984) was a Luxembourgish cyclist. He competed in the individual and team road race events at the 1928 Summer Olympics.
