= Luxembourg at the 2020 Summer Paralympics =

- IPC code: LUX
- NPC: Luxembourg Paralympic Committee
- Website: www.paralympics.lu

in Tokyo
- Competitors: 1 in 1 sports

Summer Paralympics appearances (overview)
- 1976; 1980; 1984; 1988; 1992; 1996; 2000–2004; 2008; 2012–2016; 2020; 2024

Luxembourg competed at the 2020 Summer Paralympics in Tokyo, Japan, from 24 August to 5 September 2021.

== Athletics ==
One Luxembourgish male athlete, Tom Habscheid (Shot put F63), successfully to break through the qualifications for the 2020 Paralympics after breaking the qualification limit.

He finished in 4th place in the men's shot put F63 event.
