= Ferd Wirtz =

Luxembourgish gymnast (1885–1947)

- Full name: Ferdinand Wirtz
- Born: 26 November 1885 Luxembourg City, Luxembourg
- Died: 18 April 1947 (aged 61) Luxembourg City, Luxembourg

Gymnastics career
- Discipline: Men's artistic gymnastics
- Country represented: Luxembourg

Ferdinand Wirtz (26 November 1885 – 18 April 1947) was a Luxembourgish gymnast who competed in the 1912 Summer Olympics. He was born in Luxembourg City. In 1912, he was a member of the Luxembourgish team, which finished fourth in the team, European system competition and fifth in the team, free system event.
