= Marcel Neumann =

Luxembourgish swimmer (1915–?)

Personal information
- Born: 5 May 1915

Sport
- Sport: Swimming

Marcel Neumann (born 5 May 1915 – ?) was a Luxembourgish swimmer. He competed in two events at the 1936 Summer Olympics.
