= Luxembourg at the 2016 Summer Olympics =

- IOC code: LUX
- NOC: Luxembourg Olympic and Sporting Committee
- Website: www.teamletzebuerg.lu (in French)

in Rio de Janeiro
- Competitors: 10 in 5 sports
- Flag bearer: Gilles Müller
- Medals: Gold 0 Silver 0 Bronze 0 Total 0

Summer Olympics appearances (overview)
- 1900; 1904–1908; 1912; 1920; 1924; 1928; 1932; 1936; 1948; 1952; 1956; 1960; 1964; 1968; 1972; 1976; 1980; 1984; 1988; 1992; 1996; 2000; 2004; 2008; 2012; 2016; 2020; 2024

Luxembourg competed at the 2016 Summer Olympics in Rio de Janeiro, Brazil, from 5 to 21 August 2016. Since the nation's official debut in 1900, Luxembourgish athletes have appeared in every edition of the Summer Olympic Games throughout the modern era, with the exception of the sparsely attended 1904 and 1908 Summer Olympics, and the 1932 Summer Olympics in Los Angeles at the period of the worldwide Great Depression.

Luxembourg Olympic and Sporting Committee selected a team of 10 athletes to compete in five sports at the Games. The nation's roster in Rio de Janeiro was also a replication to those sent to Athens 2004, but had an equal share between men and women with five each. Among the sports represented by the athletes, Luxembourg staged its Olympic comeback in track and field from a 12-year absence.

The Luxembourg team featured six returning Olympians. Five of them competed at London 2012, with the exception of professional road cyclist Fränk Schleck, who staged an eight-year comeback to his third and final Olympic circuit in Rio de Janeiro before retiring from the sport. Other notable Luxembourgian athletes were swimmers Raphaël Stacchiotti and Laurent Carnol, table tennis player and four-time Olympian Ni Xialian, and world no. 44 tennis player Gilles Müller, who led the team as the nation's flag bearer in the opening ceremony.

Luxembourg, however, failed to win its first Olympic medal, since the 1952 Summer Olympics in Helsinki, where middle-distance runner Josy Barthel took home the men's 1500 m title.

== Athletics ==
Luxembourgish athletes have so far achieved qualifying standards in the following athletics events (up to a maximum of 3 athletes in each event), signifying the nation's Olympic return to the sport for the first time since 2004:

Key

- Note–Ranks given for track events are within the athlete's heat only
- Q = Qualified for the next round
- q = Qualified for the next round as a fastest loser or, in field events, by position without achieving the qualifying target
- NR = National record
- N/A = Round not applicable for the event
- Bye = Athlete not required to compete in round

Track & road events

Athlete	Event	Heat		Semifinal		Final	
Athlete	Event	Result	Rank	Result	Rank	Result	Rank
Charles Grethen	Men's 800 m	1:48.93	5	Did not advance			
Charline Mathias	Women's 800 m	2:09.30	8	Did not advance			

== Cycling ==
=== Road ===
Luxembourgish riders qualified for the following quota places in the men's and women's Olympic road race by virtue of their best individual ranking in the 2015 UCI World Tour (for men) and top 22 national finish in the 2016 UCI World Ranking (for women).

Athlete	Event	Time	Rank
Fränk Schleck	Men's road race	6:13:36	20
Chantal Hoffmann	Women's road race	Did not finish	
Christine Majerus	Women's road race	3:56:34	18
Christine Majerus	Women's time trial	48:16.17	22

== Swimming ==
Luxembourgish swimmers have so far achieved qualifying standards in the following events (up to a maximum of 2 swimmers in each event at the Olympic Qualifying Time (OQT), and potentially 1 at the Olympic Selection Time (OST)):

Athlete	Event	Heat		Semifinal		Final	
Athlete	Event	Time	Rank	Time	Rank	Time	Rank
Laurent Carnol	Men's 100 m breaststroke	1:00.88	=27	Did not advance			
Laurent Carnol	Men's 200 m breaststroke	2:11.94	21	Did not advance			
Raphaël Stacchiotti	Men's 100 m freestyle	50.79	47	Did not advance			
Raphaël Stacchiotti	Men's 200 m individual medley	2:00.21	21	Did not advance			
Raphaël Stacchiotti	Men's 400 m individual medley	4:20.37	23	—		Did not advance	
Julie Meynen	Women's 50 m freestyle	25.12	26	Did not advance			
Julie Meynen	Women's 100 m freestyle	55.09	25	Did not advance			

== Table tennis ==
Luxembourg has entered one athlete into the table tennis competition at the Games. Remarkably going to her fifth Olympics, Ni Xialian granted an invitation from ITTF to compete in the women's singles as one of the next seven highest-ranked eligible players, not yet qualified, on the Olympic Ranking List.

Athlete	Event	Preliminary	Round 1	Round 2	Round 3	Round of 16	Quarterfinals	Semifinals	Final / BM	
Athlete	Event	Opposition Result	Opposition Result	Opposition Result	Opposition Result	Opposition Result	Opposition Result	Opposition Result	Opposition Result	Rank
Ni Xialian	Women's singles	Bye	Kumahara (BRA); W 4–3	Shen Yf (ESP); W 4–3	Feng Tw (SIN); L 2–4	Did not advance				

== Tennis ==
Luxembourg has entered one tennis player into the Olympic tournament. London 2012 Olympian Gilles Müller (world no. 44) qualified directly for the men's singles as one of the top 56 eligible players in the ATP World Rankings as of June 6, 2016.

Athlete	Event	Round of 64	Round of 32	Round of 16	Quarterfinals	Semifinals	Final / BM	
Athlete	Event	Opposition Score	Opposition Score	Opposition Score	Opposition Score	Opposition Score	Opposition Score	Rank
Gilles Müller	Men's singles	Janowicz (POL); W 7–5, 1–6, 7–6^{(12–10)}	Tsonga (FRA); W 6–4, 6–3	Bautista Agut (ESP); L 4–6, 6–7^{(4–7)}	Did not advance			
