= Luxembourg at the 1996 Summer Olympics =

- IOC code: LUX
- NOC: Luxembourg Olympic and Sporting Committee
- Website: www.teamletzebuerg.lu (in French)

in Atlanta
- Competitors: 6 (2 men and 4 women) in 5 sports
- Flag bearer: Anne Kremer (opening)
- Medals: Gold 0 Silver 0 Bronze 0 Total 0

Summer Olympics appearances (overview)
- 1900; 1904–1908; 1912; 1920; 1924; 1928; 1932; 1936; 1948; 1952; 1956; 1960; 1964; 1968; 1972; 1976; 1980; 1984; 1988; 1992; 1996; 2000; 2004; 2008; 2012; 2016; 2020; 2024

Luxembourg competed at the 1996 Summer Olympics in Atlanta, United States. Six competitors, two men and four women, took part in seven events in five sports.

== Fencing ==
One female fencer represented Luxembourg in 1996.

Women's épée

- Mariette Schmit

== Tennis ==
Women's Singles Competition

- Anne Kremer
  1. First round — Lost to Lindsay Davenport (USA) 2-6 1-6
