= Nicolas Wagner =

Luxembourgish dressage rider

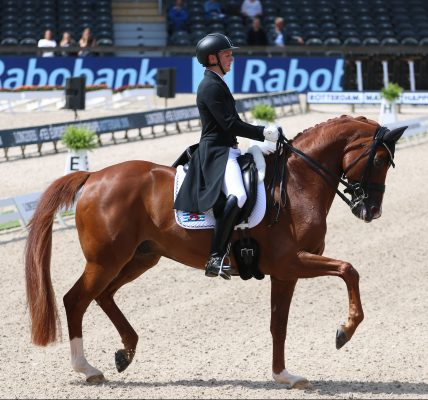
- Nicolas Wagner (2019)

Personal information
- Full name: Nicolas Wagner Ehlinger
- Born: 2 January 1992 (age 34) Luxembourg City

Sport
- Country: Luxembourg
- Sport: Equestrian
- Club: Riders Club Luxembourg

Achievements and titles
- Olympic finals: Tokyo 2020; Paris 2024

Nicolas Wagner Ehlinger (born 2 January 1992) is a dressage rider from Luxembourg. He competed at the 2019 European Championships in Rotterdam. He competed as an individual for the 2020 Tokyo Olympic Games, finished 25th in the individual competition and at the Paris 2024 Olympic Games where he finished 24th in the individual competition.
