= Joseph Alzin =

Luxembourgish weightlifter (1893–1930)

Medal record

Men's weightlifting

Representing Luxembourg

Olympic Games
| Silver medal – second place | 1920 Antwerp | Heavyweight |

Joseph Alzin (18 December 1893 – 2 September 1930) was a Luxembourgish weightlifter, competing at the Summer Olympics for Luxembourg in 1920 and the 1924 Summer Olympics. He was born in Paris, and died in Marseille. He won the silver medal at the 1920 Olympics in the heavyweight (+82.5 kg) weightlifting.
