= André Braun =

Luxembourgish archer (born 1944)

Personal information
- Nationality: Luxembourgish
- Born: 1 May 1944 (age 80); Esch-sur-Alzette, Luxembourg

Sport
- Sport: Archery

André Braun (born 1 May 1944) is a Luxembourgish archer. He competed at the 1980 Summer Olympics and the 1984 Summer Olympics.
