= Roger Theisen =

Luxembourgish fencer (1932–2024)

Personal information
- Born: 11 February 1932 Luxembourg, Luxembourg
- Died: 20 August 2024 (aged 92) Overijse, Belgium

Sport
- Sport: Fencing

Roger Theisen (11 February 1932 – 20 August 2024) was a Luxembourgish épée, foil and sabre fencer. He competed at the 1956 and 1960 Summer Olympics. died in Overijse, Belgium on 20 August 2024, at the age of 92.
