= Victor Kremer =

Luxembourgish sports shooter

Personal information
- Born: 31 July 1932 Hesperange, Luxembourg
- Died: 12 August 2010 (aged 78) Mondorf-les-Bains, Luxembourg

Sport
- Sport: Sports shooting

Victor Kremer (31 July 1932 – 12 August 2010) was a Luxembourgish sports shooter. He competed at the 1960 Summer Olympics and the 1964 Summer Olympics.
