= Yves Clausse =

Luxembourgish swimmer

Personal information
- Born: 4 February 1969 (age 57) Ettelbruck, Luxembourg

Sport
- Sport: Swimming

Yves Clausse (born 4 February 1969) is a Luxembourgish swimmer. He competed at the 1988 Summer Olympics and the 1992 Summer Olympics.
