= Roland Jacoby =

Luxembourgish sport shooter

Personal information
- Nationality: Luxembourgish
- Born: 16 April 1952 (age 74) Luxembourg

Sport
- Sport: Sport shooting

Roland Jacoby (born 16 April 1952) is a Luxembourgish sport shooter. He was born in Luxembourg.

He competed at the 1980 Summer Olympics in Moscow, at the 1984 Summer Olympics in Los Angeles, and at the 1988 Summer Olympics in Seoul.
