= René Kohn =

Luxembourgish swimmer

Personal information
- Born: 16 June 1933 Diekirch, Luxembourg
- Died: 18 July 1989 (aged 56) Aalst, Belgium

Sport
- Sport: Swimming

René Kohn (16 June 1933 – 18 July 1989) was a Luxembourgish swimmer. He competed at the 1952 Summer Olympics and the 1956 Summer Olympics.
