= Jeannette Goergen-Philipp =

Luxembourgish archer (born 1947)

Personal information
- Nationality: Luxembourgish
- Born: 30 November 1947 (age 78) Echternach, Luxembourg

Sport
- Sport: Archery

Jeannette Goergen-Philipp (born 30 November 1947) is a Luxembourgish archer. She was born in Echternach.

She competed at the 1984 Summer Olympics in Los Angeles, and at the 1992 Summer Olympics in Barcelona.
