= Fernand Leischen =

Luxembourgish fencer

Personal information
- Born: 21 August 1919 Differdange, Luxembourg
- Died: 20 April 2017 (aged 97)

Sport
- Sport: Fencing

Jean-Fernand Leischen (21 August 1919 – 20 April 2017) was a Luxembourgish fencer who competed in three Summer Olympic Games, competing in the men's individual and team épée events at each one. His best result was fourth at the team épée event at the 1952 Summer Olympics in Helsinki, Finland. In 2008 he was promoted to the rank of Chevalier in the Order of Merit of the Grand Duchy of Luxembourg. He also served as President of the Luxembourg Fencing Federation from 1961-1964.
