= Émile Gretsch =

Luxembourgish fencer

Personal information
- Born: 12 August 1908 Echternach, Luxembourg
- Died: 17 July 2004 (aged 95) Echternach, Luxembourg

Sport
- Sport: Fencing

Émile Gretsch (12 August 1908 – 17 July 2004) was a Luxembourgish épée and foil fencer. He competed at the 1948, 1952 and 1956 Summer Olympics.
