= Gérard Rasquin =

Luxembourgish sprinter

Personal information
- Nationality: Luxembourgish
- Born: 30 July 1927
- Died: 11 December 2012 (aged 85)

Sport
- Sport: Sprinting
- Event: 400 metres

Gérard Rasquin (30 July 1927 – 11 December 2012) was a Luxembourgish sprinter. He competed in the 400 metres at the 1952 Summer Olympics and the 1956 Summer Olympics.
