= Robert Schiel =

Luxembourgish fencer

Personal information
- Born: 26 October 1939 (age 86) Dudelange, Luxembourg

Sport
- Sport: Fencing

Robert Schiel (born 26 October 1939) is a Luxembourgish épée and foil fencer. He competed at the 1960, 1972 and 1976 Summer Olympics.
