= Luxembourg Olympic and Sporting Committee =

National Olympic Committee

- Country: Luxembourg
- [[|]]
- Code: LUX
- Created: 1912
- Recognized: 1912
- Continental Association: EOC
- Headquarters: Strassen, Luxembourg
- President: André Hoffmann
- Secretary General: Daniel Dax
- Website: www.teamletzebuerg.lu

Team Luxembourg logo

The Luxembourg Olympic and Sporting Committee (French: Comité Olympique et Sportif Luxembourgeois, COSL; German: Luxemburgisches Olympisches und Sportkomitee, Luxembourgish: Lëtzebuerger Olympesche a Sporting Comité; IOC Code: LUX), is the National Olympic Committee for Luxembourg.

== List of presidents ==
President	Term
Robert Brasseur	1912–1922
Maurice Pescatore	1922–1925
Gustave Jacquemart	1925–1950
Paul Wilwertz	1950–1970
Prosper Link	1970–1972
Josy Barthel	1973–1977
Gérard Rasquin	1977–1989
Norbert Haupert	1989–1999
Marc Theisen	1999–2012
André Hoffmann	2012–present

== See also ==
- Luxembourg at the Olympics
