= Luxembourg at the 1928 Winter Olympics =

- IOC code: LUX
- NOC: Luxembourg Olympic and Sporting Committee
- Website: www.teamletzebuerg.lu (in French)

in St. Moritz
- Competitors: 5 (men) in 1 sport
- Flag bearer: Willy Heldenstein
- Medals: Gold 0 Silver 0 Bronze 0 Total 0

Winter Olympics appearances (overview)
- 1928; 1932; 1936; 1948–1984; 1988; 1992; 1994; 1998; 2002; 2006; 2010; 2014; 2018; 2022; 2026; 2030

Luxembourg participated at the 1928 Winter Olympics in St. Moritz, Switzerland, held between 11 and 19 February 1928. The country's participation in the Games marked its debut at the Winter Olympics.

The Luxembourg team consisted of a five male athletes who competed in a single event. Willy Heldenstein served as the country's flag-bearer during the opening ceremony. Luxembourg did not win any medal in the Games.

== Background ==
Luxembourg Olympic and Sporting Committee is the National Olympic Committee of Luxembourg, which was established in 1912 ahead of the country's participation in the 1912 Summer Olympics. While the country officially started participating in the Olympic programme since 1912, Michel Théato, who won the men's marathon event at the 1900 Summer Olympics belonged to the country. The country did not participate in the inaugural 1924 Winter Olympics. This edition of the Games in 1928 marked the nation's debut appearance at the Winter Games.

The 1928 Winter Olympics was held in St. Moritz, Switzerland, between 11 and 19 February 1928. The Luxembourg delegation consisted of five men competing in bobsleigh. Willy Heldenstein served as the country's flag-bearer in the Parade of Nations during the opening ceremony. Luxembourg did not win any medal in the Games.

== Competitors ==
Luxembourg sent five athlete who competed in a single sport at the Games.

Sport	Men	Women	Athletes
Bobsleigh	5	0	5
Total	5	0	5

== Bobsleigh ==
The Luxembourg team consisted of Marc Shoetter, Raoul Weckbecker, Willy Heldenstein, Pierre Kaempff, and Auguste Hilbert, who became the first Winter Olympic competitors for the country. Shoetter led the bobsleigh team. Heldenstein, who was the flag bearer, was the brother of 1924 Summer Olympics medalist Frantz Heldenstein. Hilbert was originally a footballer, who later took up bobsleigh after the First World War. Raoul Weckbecker, who was active in both skiing and bobsleigh, would go on to compete in the 1936 Winter Olympics in bobsleigh and alpine skiing. Kaempff competed in bobsleigh and cycling events.

Bobsleigh competitions were held on 13 and 14 February at Olympia Bobrun in St. Moritz. The event was run on a 1,722 m (5,650 ft) course with a vertical drop of 130 m (430 ft). The Luxembourg team finished third to last in the event with a combined time of just over three minutes and 32 seconds across the two runs.

Sled	Athletes	Event	Run 1		Run 2		Total	
Sled	Athletes	Event	Time	Rank	Time	Rank	Time	Rank
LUX	Marc Shoetter; Raoul Weckbecker; Willy Heldenstein; Pierre Kaempff; Auguste Hilbert	Five-man	1:45.8	20	1:46.9	19	3:32.7	20
