= Luxembourg at the 1936 Winter Olympics =

- IOC code: LUX
- NOC: Luxembourg Olympic and Sporting Committee
- Website: www.teamletzebuerg.lu (in French)

in Garmisch-Partenkirchen
- Competitors: 4 (men) in 2 sports
- Medals: Gold 0 Silver 0 Bronze 0 Total 0

Winter Olympics appearances (overview)
- 1928; 1932; 1936; 1948–1984; 1988; 1992; 1994; 1998; 2002; 2006; 2010; 2014; 2018; 2022; 2026

Luxembourg competed at the 1936 Winter Olympics in Garmisch-Partenkirchen, Germany. The nation returned to the Winter Games after missing the 1932 Winter Olympics.

== Alpine skiing ==
Men

Athlete	Event	Downhill		Slalom			Total	
Athlete	Event	Time	Rank	Time 1	Time 2	Rank	Total points	Rank
Raoul Weckbecker	Combined	DNF	–	–	–	–	DNF	–

== Bobsleigh ==
Sled	Athletes	Event	Run 1		Run 2		Run 3		Run 4		Total	
Sled	Athletes	Event	Time	Rank	Time	Rank	Time	Rank	Time	Rank	Time	Rank
LUX-1	Raoul Weckbecker; Géza Wertheim	Two-man	1:45.41	23	1:33.95	23	1:35.96	22	1:37.47	22	6:32.79	22
LUX-2	Henri Koch; Gustav Wagner	Two-man	1:42.02	22	1:31.91	21	1:29.76	12	DNF	–	DNF	–
