= Luxembourg at the 2018 Winter Olympics =

- Flag of Luxembourg
- IOC code: LUX
- NOC: Luxembourg Olympic and Sporting Committee
- Website: www.teamletzebuerg.lu (in French)

in Pyeongchang, South Korea 9–25 February 2018
- Competitors: 1 (1 man) in 1 sport
- Flag bearer: Matthieu Osch
- Medals: Gold 0 Silver 0 Bronze 0 Total 0

Winter Olympics appearances (overview)
- 1928; 1932; 1936; 1948–1984; 1988; 1992; 1994; 1998; 2002; 2006; 2010; 2014; 2018; 2022; 2026; 2030

Luxembourg competed at the 2018 Winter Olympics in Pyeongchang, South Korea, from 9 to 25 February 2018. It was represented by one competitor, alpine skier Matthieu Osch.

== Competitors ==
The following is the list of number of competitors participating in the Luxembourgish delegation per sport.

Sport	Men	Women	Total
Alpine skiing	1	0	1
Total	1	0	1

== Alpine skiing ==
Luxembourg qualified one male athlete, signifying the nation's Olympic return to the sport for the first time since 1994. The Luxembourgish Olympic and Sporting Committee sets stricter standards than the International Ski Federation (FIS) to qualify for the Games. This required any alpine skier to at least score two races under 45 FIS points.

Athlete	Event	Run 1		Run 2		Total	
Athlete	Event	Time	Rank	Time	Rank	Time	Rank
Matthieu Osch	Men's giant slalom	1:21.45	74	1:18.94	60	2:40.39	62
Matthieu Osch	Men's slalom	DNF					

== Non-competing sport ==
=== Cross-country skiing ===
Kari Peters has reached the standards set by the FIS, however he did not meet the standards by the Luxembourgish Olympic and Sporting Committee for selection to the team. This included getting two races results under 100 FIS points.

== See also ==
- Luxembourg at the 2018 Summer Youth Olympics
