= Claire Maxwell =

Claire Maxwell may refer to:

- Claire Maxwell (sociologist) (born 1975), sociologist
- Claire Maxwell (netball) (born 1988), Scottish netball player
