= Luxembourg at the 2026 Winter Olympics =

- Flag of Luxembourg
- IOC code: LUX
- NOC: Luxembourg Olympic and Sporting Committee
- Website: www.teamletzebuerg.lu (in French)

in Milan and Cortina d'Ampezzo, Italy 6 February 2026 – 22 February 2026
- Competitors: 2 (1 man and 1 woman) in 1 sport
- Flag bearer (opening): Matthieu Osch
- Flag bearer (closing): Matthieu Osch
- Medals: Gold 0 Silver 0 Bronze 0 Total 0

Winter Olympics appearances (overview)
- 1928; 1932; 1936; 1948–1984; 1988; 1992; 1994; 1998; 2002; 2006; 2010; 2014; 2018; 2022; 2026

Luxembourg competed at the 2026 Winter Olympics in Milan and Cortina d'Ampezzo, Italy, from 6 to 22 February 2026.

Alpine skier Matthieu Osch, competing at his third Olympics, was the country's flagbearer for both the opening and closing ceremony.

== Competitors ==
The following is the list of number of competitors participating at the Games per sport/discipline.

Sport	Men	Women	Total
Alpine skiing	1	1	2
Total	1	1	2

== Alpine skiing ==
Luxembourg qualified one female and one male alpine skier through the basic quota.

Athlete	Event	Run 1		Run 2		Total	
Athlete	Event	Time	Rank	Time	Rank	Time	Rank
Matthieu Osch	Men's giant slalom	1:25.06	50	1:18.12	43	2:43.18	46
Matthieu Osch	Men's slalom	1:04.22	28	1:03.24	29	2:07.46	28
Gwyneth ten Raa	Women's giant slalom	1:06.60	34	1:12.85	30	2:19.45	30
Gwyneth ten Raa	Women's slalom	DNF					
