= Luxembourg at the 1992 Winter Olympics =

- IOC code: LUX
- NOC: Luxembourg Olympic and Sporting Committee
- Website: www.teamletzebuerg.lu (in French)

in Albertville
- Competitors: 1 (man) in 1 sport
- Medals Ranked 16th: Gold 0 Silver 2 Bronze 0 Total 2

Winter Olympics appearances (overview)
- 1928; 1932; 1936; 1948–1984; 1988; 1992; 1994; 1998; 2002; 2006; 2010; 2014; 2018; 2022; 2026

Luxembourg sent a delegation to compete at the 1992 Winter Olympics in Albertville, France, from 8 to 23 February 1992. This marked Luxembourg's fourth appearance at a Winter Olympic Games. The Luxembourgian delegation in Albertville consisted of a single athlete, alpine skier Marc Girardelli. He won two silver medals at these Olympics, which positioned Luxembourg 17th place on the medal table.

== Background ==
Luxembourg first joined Olympic competition at the 1900 Summer Olympics and made their debut at the Winter Olympic Games in 1928. However, their participation in Winter Olympics has been sporadic, as Luxembourg did not send a delegation to any Winter Olympics from 1948 to 1984. The 1992 Winter Olympics took place from 8 to 23 February 1992. Albertville marked their fourth appearance at a Winter Olympics. The delegation sent by Luxembourg to Albertville consisted of a single athlete, alpine skier Marc Girardelli.

== Medalists ==
Medal	Name	Sport	Event	Date
Silver	Marc Girardelli	Alpine skiing	Men's super-G	16 February
Silver	Marc Girardelli	Alpine skiing	Men's giant slalom	18 February

With two silver medals, Luxembourg placed 17th on the medal table.

== Competitors ==
The following is the list of number of competitors in the Games.

Sport	Men	Women	Total
Alpine skiing	1	0	1
Total	1	0	1

== Alpine skiing ==
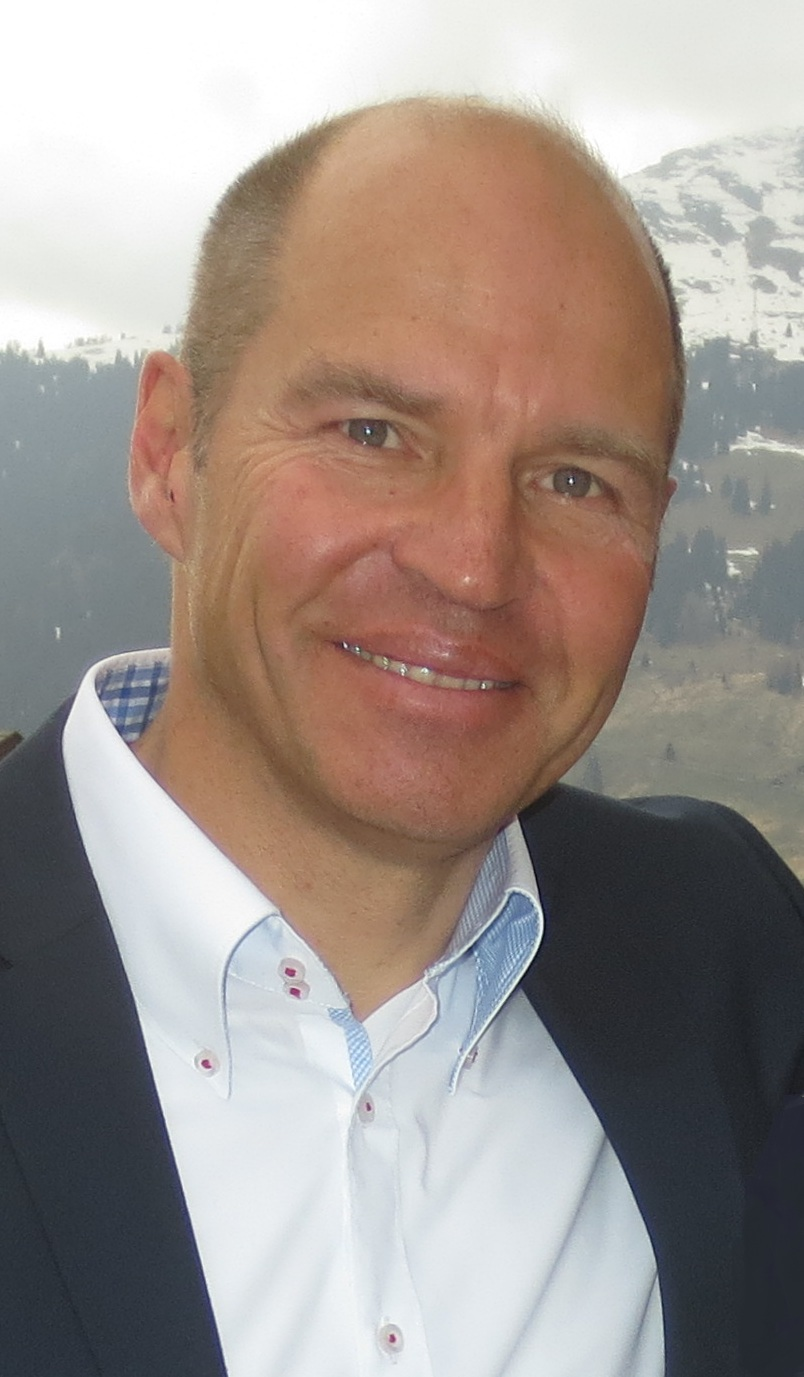
Girardelli won two medals in Albertville.

Marc Girardelli was 28 years old at the time of the Albertville Olympics. Considered a "dominant figure" in alpine skiing, the Austrian-born Girardelli had been forced to miss the 1980 and 1984 Winter Olympics over issues with his citizenship. He had previously represented Luxembourg at the 1988 Winter Olympics. The downhill was held on 9 February, but Girardelli failed to finish the race. Next for him was the combined, which consisted of one run of the downhill on 10 February and two slalom runs of 11 February. As he crashed in the downhill segment, he was not allowed to participate in the slalom portions of the competition. In the single leg Super-G held on 16 February, he won his first Olympic medal, finishing second in a time of 1 minute and 11.77 seconds, which was nearly three-quarters of a second behind the gold medallist Kjetil André Aamodt of Norway.

After winning silver in the Super-G, it would take only two days for him to win his second Olympic medal. In the two-leg giant slalom race, he posted times of 1 minute and 4.70 seconds and 1 minute and 2.60 seconds. His total time of 2 minutes and 7.30 seconds gave him the silver medal, 32/100ths of a second behind the gold medallist, Alberto Tomba of Italy. In his last event, the slalom of 22 February, he was disqualified for missing a gate during the first run. Girardelli would later represent Luxembourg at the 1994 Winter Olympics, though he would not win any medals in Lillehammer, his best performance there was fourth in the super-G.

Athlete	Event	Race 1	Race 2	Total	
Athlete	Event	Time	Time	Time	Rank
Marc Girardelli	Downhill			DNF	–
Marc Girardelli	Super-G			1:13.77	2nd place, silver medalist(s)
Marc Girardelli	Giant slalom	1:04.70	1:02.60	2:07.30	2nd place, silver medalist(s)
Marc Girardelli	Slalom	DSQ	–	DSQ	–

Athlete	Event	Downhill	Slalom		Total	
Athlete	Event	Time	Time 1	Time 2	Points	Rank
Marc Girardelli	Combined	DNF	–	–	DNF	–

== See also ==
- Luxembourg at the 1992 Summer Olympics
