= Elene Gedevanishvili =

Georgian figure skater

Elene Gedevanishvili ელენე გედევანიშვილი
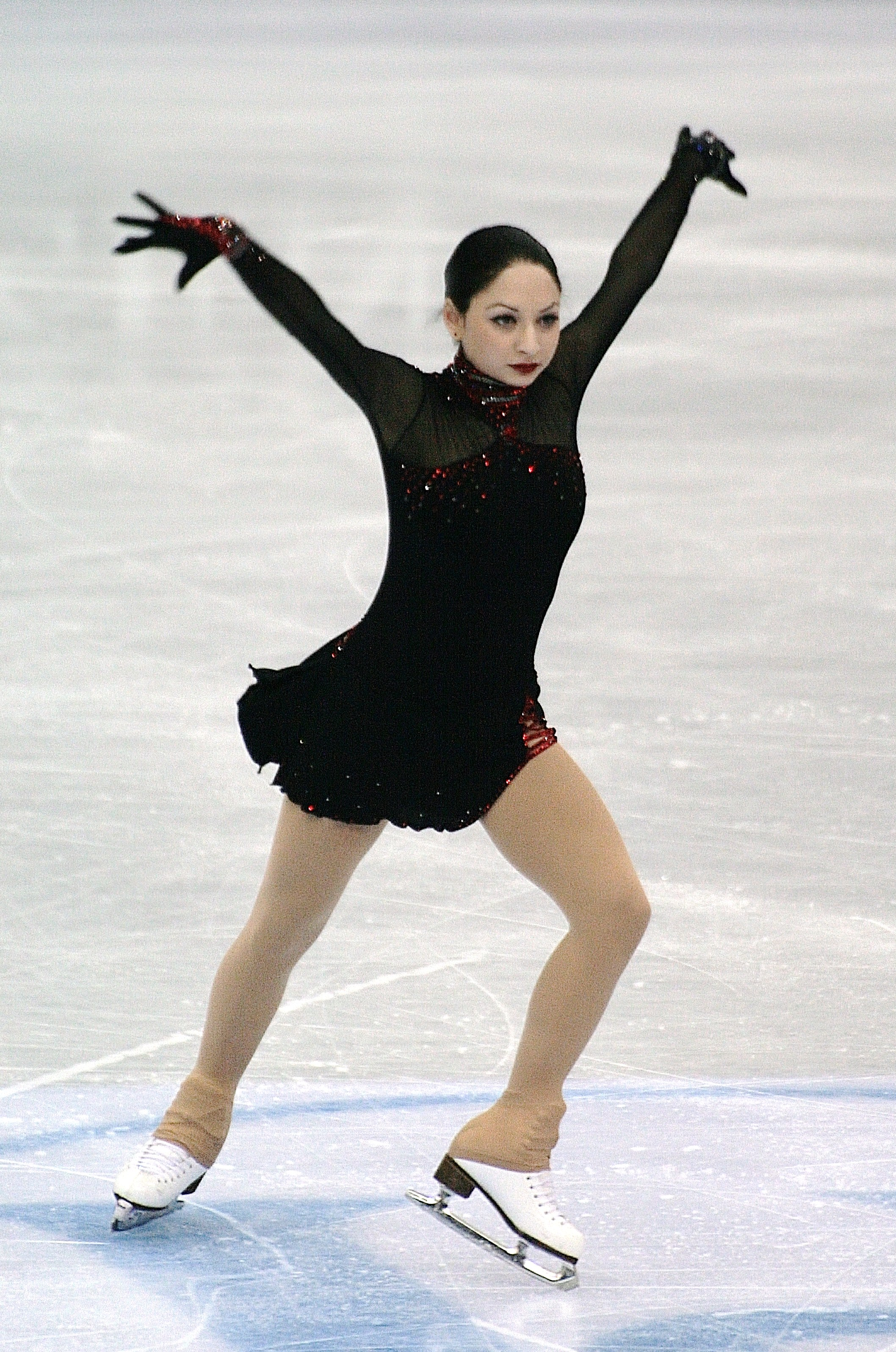
- Gedevanishvili in March 2012

Personal information
- Born: 7 January 1990 (age 36) Tbilisi, Georgian SSR, Soviet Union
- Height: 1.53 m (5 ft 0 in)

Figure skating career
- Country: Georgia
- Coach: Craig Maurizi, Igor Krokavec
- Skating club: Dinamo Tbilisi
- Began skating: 1993
- Retired: 2016?
Medal record
Figure skating: Ladies' singles
Representing Georgia
European Championships
Bronze medal – third place	2010 Tallinn	Ladies' singles
Bronze medal – third place	2012 Sheffield	Ladies' singles

Elene Gedevanishvili (Georgian: ელენე გედევანიშვილი, born 7 January 1990) is a Georgian former competitive figure skater. She is a two-time (2012, 2010) European bronze medalist. In winning the medal in 2010, Gedevanishvili became the first skater from Georgia to medal at an ISU Championships. She has competed at three Winter Olympics: Turin 2006, Vancouver 2010 and Sochi 2014.

== Personal life ==
Elene Gedevanishvili was born in Tbilisi, Georgian SSR. She is the elder sister of Dmitri Gedevanishvili, a competitive alpine skier. She graduated from Plymouth State University in Spring 2019 with Bachelor of Science in psychology of exercise.

Gedevanishvili now works as an ice skating instructor at Cutting Edge Ice Academy, an ice hockey training facility in Elmwood Park, NJ.

== Career ==
=== Early years ===
As a child, Gedevanishvili lived and trained in Georgia and went to training camps in Moscow, Russia. At the age of nine, she and her mother settled in Moscow and at age eleven, she began working with Elena Buianova (Vodorezova). She trained at CSKA Moscow with Buianova and Tatiana Tarasova. At the 2005–06 ISU Junior Grand Prix event in Estonia, she became the first Georgian skater to win a Junior Grand Prix event.

=== Senior debut ===
Gedevanishvili made her senior international debut at the 2006 European Championships where she finished 5th. Her second senior competition was the 2006 Winter Olympics. She was 6th in the short program and finished 10th overall. She ended the season at the 2006 World Championships, placing 14th.

In October 2006, Gedevanishvili was forced to leave Russia after the Russian authorities revoked her mother's visa on a technicality. Her mother was given ten days to leave the country so Buianova recommended that the skater train in Tallinn, Estonia with Anna Levandi (Kondrashova) for her first Grand Prix event of the season, the 2006 Cup of China, which was to take place in three weeks. Shortly thereafter, Gedevanishvili contracted a case of whooping cough that went undiagnosed for several months. She withdrew from both of her Grand Prix events. In December 2006, she moved to Wayne, New Jersey to train with coach Galina Zmievskaya, former coach of Olympic gold medalist Oksana Baiul. She left Zmievskaya in April 2007 due to a personality conflict.

Gedevanishvili was awarded the Order of Honor by Georgian President Mikheil Saakashvili for her achievements as an athlete and in recognition of her treatment in Russia. She moved to Hackensack, New Jersey to train with coaches Roman Serov and Viktor Kudriavtsev at the Ice House. In 2009, she changed coaches to Robin Wagner. She also occasionally worked with Roman Serov on her jumps and 1982 World Champion Elaine Zayak. Gedevanishvili can perform the Biellmann spin with a foot change.

=== 2009–present ===
In 2009, Gedevanishvili finished 25th at Europeans, the lowest result at the event in her career, but then achieved a career-best result at the World Championships where she finished 10th. Her Worlds placement qualified her for her second Olympics.

Gedevanishvili became the first skater representing Georgia to medal at an ISU Championships when she won the bronze medal at the 2010 European Championships. She then competed in the 2010 Winter Olympics, placing 9th in the short program, 17th in the free skate, and 14th overall. At the final event of the season, the 2010 World Championships, she finished 18th.

In the 2010–11 season, Gedevanishvili finished 8th at the 2011 European Championships. She was able to repeat her career-best 10th-place finish at the World Championships. In July 2011, Gedevanishvili switched coaches to Brian Orser in Toronto, Ontario, Canada. On 28 January 2012, she won her second European bronze medal at the 2012 European Championships. She was 10th at the 2012 World Championships.

In the 2012–13 season, Gedevanishvili was 14th at European Championships. At the 2013 World Championships, she missed an opportunity to qualify for the 2014 Winter Olympics by finishing 29th, the lowest Worlds placement of her career. In the summer of 2013, Gedevanishvili moved from Toronto to Boxborough, Massachusetts in order to be closer to her family. Konstantin Kostin and Edouard Pliner became her coaches.

In September 2013, Gedevanishvili placed 6th at the Nebelhorn Trophy, the last Olympic qualifying event. As a result of her placement, Georgia received one of the six ladies' spots available to countries not having qualified at 2013 Worlds. Gedevanishvili switched coaches back to Brian Orser and Ghislain Briand after the Grand Prix series. Gedevanishvili placed 10th at European Championships and 19th at the 2014 Winter Olympics.

For the 2014-15 season, Gedevanishvili was assigned to the 2014 Skate America.

Currently, Gedevanishvili is a skating technique instructor for ice hockey players at Cutting Edge Ice Academy in Elmwood Park, New Jersey.

== Programs ==
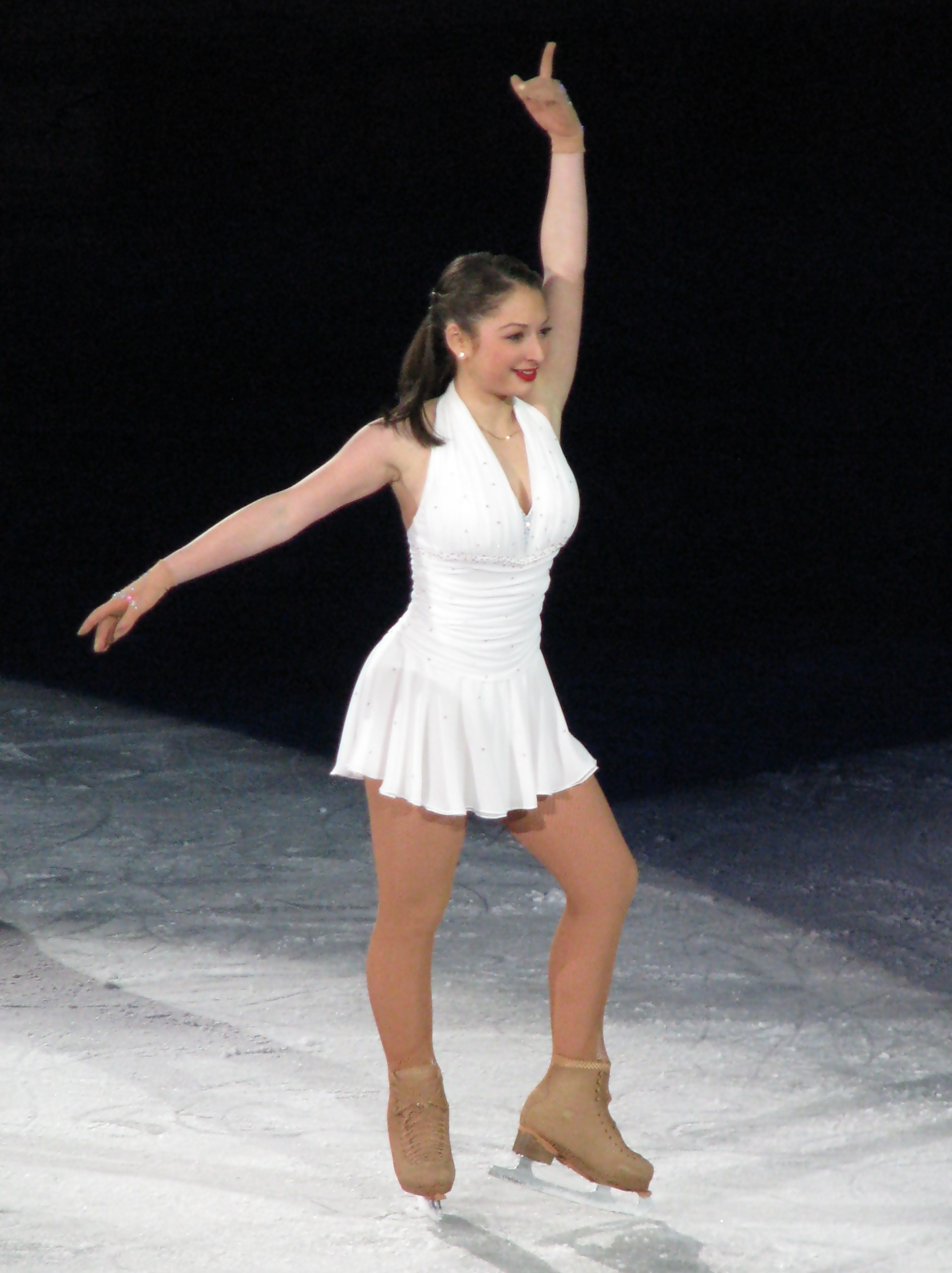
Gedevanishvili at the 2010 European Championships exhibition gala.

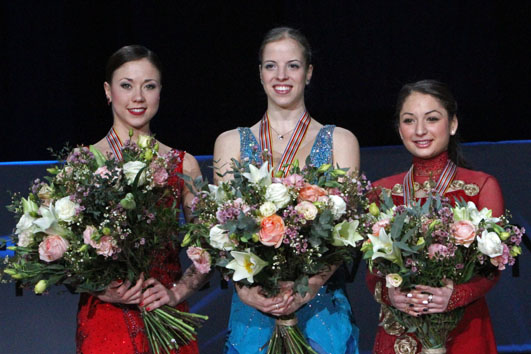
Gedevanishvili with the other medalists at the 2010 European Championships.

Season	Short program	Free skating	Exhibition
2015-2016	Papa, Can You Hear Me? (from Yentl) by Michel Legrand performed by Barbra Streisand	Carmen by Georges Bizet	
2014–2015	Papa, Can You Hear Me? (from Yentl) by Michel Legrand performed by Barbra Streisand; Méditation (from Thaïs) by Jules Massenet	Carmen by Georges Bizet; Burlesque: Tough Lover; Express; Show Me How You Burlesque	
2013–2014	Romance (from The Blizzard) by Georgy Sviridov	Giselle by Adolphe Adam	
2012–2013	Schindler's List by John Williams	Don Quixote by Ludwig Minkus	...Baby One More Time by Britney Spears
2011–2012	Tango Jalousie by Jacob Gade	Phantom of the Opera by Andrew Lloyd Webber	Unusual Way by Nicole Kidman
2010–2011	Cell Block Tango (from Chicago (2002 film))	Phantom of the Opera by Andrew Lloyd Webber	
2009–2010	Fever by Davenport	Carmen by Georges Bizet	I Wanna Be Loved by You by Marilyn Monroe
2008–2009	Cabaret by John Kander and Fred Ebb	"Don't Let Me Be Misunderstood" by Santa Esmeralda; Besame Mucho; Historia de un amor by Pérez Prado	
2007–2008	Cabaret by John Kander and Fred Ebb	Pretty Story by Francis Lai	Malaguena by Ernesto Lecuona
2006–2007	Two Guitars by Paul Mauriat	Flamenco Fantasia	
2005–2006	Granada	Armenian Rhapsody by Ara Gevorgyan	
2004–2005	The Mexican Hat Dance	Ballet égyptien by Alexandre Luigini	
2003–2004	The Mexican Hat Dance	Ballet égyptien by Alexandre Luigini	

== Competitive highlights ==
GP: Grand Prix; CS: Challenger Series (began in the 2014–15 season); JGP: Junior Grand Prix

International
Event	01–02	02–03	03–04	04–05	05–06	06–07	07–08	08–09	09–10	10–11	11–12	12–13	13–14	14–15	15–16
Olympics					10th				14th				19th		
Worlds					14th	17th	20th	10th	18th	10th	10th	29th		22nd	
Europeans					5th	8th	7th	25th	3rd	8th	3rd	14th	10th	23rd	
GP France								7th	7th						
GP NHK Trophy							8th			6th	5th	6th	9th	10th	
GP Skate America							6th		6th	7th	7th		9th	7th	
GP Skate Canada												5th			WD
Nebelhorn Trophy											2nd		6th		
Finlandia Trophy								4th							
Karl Schäfer					4th	1st									
NRW Trophy								1st							
Lombardia Trophy															8th
International: Junior
Junior Worlds			12th	5th				6th							
JGP Final					7th										
JGP Croatia			7th												
JGP Estonia					1st										
JGP France				17th											
JGP Slovakia					3rd										
JGP Ukraine				6th											
EYOF				7th											
Haabersti Cup				3rd											
National
Georgian Champ.	4th	1st	1st J.												
Team events
Japan Open												3rd T (5th P)			
J. = Junior level; WD = Withdrew; T = Team result; P = Personal result; Medals awarded for team result only.
