= Luxembourg at the 2022 Winter Olympics =

- Flag of Luxembourg
- IOC code: LUX
- NOC: Luxembourg Olympic and Sporting Committee
- Website: www.teamletzebuerg.lu (in French)

in Beijing, China 4–20 February 2022
- Competitors: 2 (1 man and 1 woman) in 1 sport
- Flag bearers (opening): Matthieu Osch; Gwyneth ten Raa
- Flag bearer (closing): Matthieu Osch
- Medals: Gold 0 Silver 0 Bronze 0 Total 0

Winter Olympics appearances (overview)
- 1928; 1932; 1936; 1948–1984; 1988; 1992; 1994; 1998; 2002; 2006; 2010; 2014; 2018; 2022; 2026; 2030

Luxembourg competed at the 2022 Winter Olympics in Beijing, China, from 4 to 20 February 2022.

The Luxembourg team consisted of two athletes (one per gender) competing in alpine skiing. Matthieu Osch and Gwyneth ten Raa were the country's flagbearer during the opening ceremony. Meanwhile Osch was also the flagbearer during the closing ceremony.

== Competitors ==
The following is the list of number of competitors participating at the Games per sport/discipline.

Sport	Men	Women	Total
Alpine skiing	1	1	2
Total	1	1	2

== Alpine skiing ==
By meeting the basic qualification standards Luxembourg qualified one male and one female alpine skier.

Athlete	Event	Run 1		Run 2		Total	
Athlete	Event	Time	Rank	Time	Rank	Time	Rank
Matthieu Osch	Men's giant slalom	1:10.60	34	1:15.94	28	2:26.54	28
Matthieu Osch	Men's slalom	DNF		Did not advance			
Gwyneth ten Raa	Women's giant slalom	DNF		Did not advance			
Gwyneth ten Raa	Women's slalom	DNF		Did not advance			

== Non-competing sport ==
=== Cross-country skiing ===
By meeting the basic qualification standards, Luxembourg qualified one male cross-country skier, but chose not to use the quota.
