= Betsy Stanko =

American criminologist academic

Professor Betsy Stanko OBE
- Born: 1950 (age 75–76); Indiana
- Education: CUNY
- Occupations: Criminologist, researcher, academic
- Known for: Research into policing of violence against women and girls.

Elizabeth Anne Stanko OBE (born December 30, 1950) is an American/British criminologist academic and researcher living and working in the UK. Stanko was awarded an Order of the British Empire (OBE) in the 2014 Queens Birthday Honours for her services to policing.

== Career ==
Stanko holds a PhD from Graduate Center of the City University of New York, has worked at Clark University (US), Brunel University, Cambridge University and is an emeritus Professor at Royal Holloway, a visiting professor at University College London, City University of London and Sheffield Hallam universities. Her former graduate students include the sociologist Claire Maxwell.

Stanko was part of a historic sexual harassment case against a university in 1981 which gained support from campaigners in the women's movement including Andrea Dworkin and Adrienne Rich.

She worked as head of evidence and insight in the Mayor of London's Office for Policing and Crime.

Stanko's research has been described as feminist criminology, exploring the impact of gender areas of law, crime and policing, combining criminology and women's studies. She served as Director of the ESRC Violence Research Programme 1997–2002.

In researching police responses to violence against women and girls Stanko has challenged stereotypes and highlighted particular vulnerabilities of some groups of women. Cultural factors influence the likelihood of the case being taken forward such as the ethnicity of the suspect, perceived inconsistencies in the victim's account and other aspects such as previous behaviour and mental health. Stanko has argued that the rape of some groups of women has become "effectively decriminalised" with a remote chance of conviction in the UK.

== Operation Soteria Bluestone ==
Jointly with Katrin Hohl, Stanko co-led the £6.6m, multiyear Operation Soteria Bluestone a collaborative programme of research for the National Police Chiefs' Council (NPCC), hosted by the Mayor's Office for Policing and Crime (MOPAC) funded by The Home Office into the policing of rape. The project investigated 19 of the 43 police forces in England and Wales. The research offered insight and evidence from police forces to inform reform of the national operating model for the investigation of rape and serious sexual assault.

The research alleged controversial comments by Sir Stephen House following the resignation of Dame Cressida Dick, which an IOPC investigation later found to be largely unproven after other attendees at the meeting said they did not recall him making them. The report highlighted cultural issues of misogyny, sexism and racism in policing which shape how victims are treated, disbelieved, blamed or stereotyped.
