= Kari Peters =

Luxembourgish cross-country skier (born 1985)

Personal information
- Born: November 17, 1985 (age 40) Dudelange, Luxembourg

Sport
- Country: Luxembourg
- Sport: Cross-country skiing

Kari Peters (born 17 November 1985 in Dudelange, Luxembourg) is a Luxembourgish cross-country skier. He competed for Luxembourg at the 2014 Winter Olympics in the Sprint event. He was also scheduled to compete in the 15 kilometre classical event, but withdrew due to suffering from a severe cold.

Kari Peters was named as the athlete to represent the country after he met the standard of less than 100 FIS Points set by the Luxembourgian Olympic and Sporting Committee. Peters is also the first ever athlete to qualify in cross-country skiing for the country. He will be the first cross-country skier to represent his country.

Peters was also selected to carry the Luxembourg flag during the opening ceremony.

== See also ==
- Luxembourg at the 2014 Winter Olympics

Olympic Games
| Preceded by Fleur Maxwell | Flagbearer for Luxembourg; Sochi 2014 | Succeeded by Incumbent --> --> |
