= Luxembourg at the 1998 Winter Olympics =

- IOC code: LUX
- NOC: Luxembourg Olympic and Sporting Committee
- Website: www.teamletzebuerg.lu (in French)

in Nagano
- Competitors: 1 (man) in 1 sport
- Flag bearer: Patrick Schmit
- Medals: Gold 0 Silver 0 Bronze 0 Total 0

Winter Olympics appearances (overview)
- 1928; 1932; 1936; 1948–1984; 1988; 1992; 1994; 1998; 2002; 2006; 2010; 2014; 2018; 2022; 2026

Luxembourg sent a delegation to compete at the 1998 Winter Olympics in Nagano, Japan from 7–22 February 1998. This was Luxembourg's sixth appearance at a Winter Olympic Games. The Luxembourgish delegation consisted of a single athlete, figure skater Patrick Schmit. In the men's singles he finished in 29th place.

== Background ==
Luxembourg first joined Olympic competition at the 1900 Summer Olympics and had their first participation at the Winter Olympic Games at the 1928 Winter Olympics. Their participation at the Winter Olympics since has been sporadic, Luxembourg did not send a delegation to any Winter Olympics from 1948 to 1984. Nagano marked their sixth appearance at a Winter Olympics. The Luxembourgish delegation to Nagano consisted of a single figure skater, Patrick Schmit. He was chosen as the flag bearer for the opening ceremony.

== Competitors ==
The following is the list of number of competitors in the Games.

Sport	Men	Women	Total
Figure skating	1	0	1
Total	1	0	1

== Figure skating ==
Patrick Schmit was 23 years old at the time of the Nagano Olympics, and was making his only Olympic appearance. The men's singles event was held over two nights, with the short program being contested on 12 February, and the free skate taking place on 14 February. In the short program, he received a total score of 71.5 points, which put him 29th and last for that round of the competition. Only the top 24 were allowed to proceed to the free skate, meaning Schmit was eliminated on the first night of the competition.

Athlete	SP	FS	TFP	Rank
Patrick Schmit	29	DNF	DNF	–
