= Cosmopolitan nationalism =

Concept from education policy studies

Cosmopolitan nationalism is a concept used to describe the dual tendency of combining local and global policy orientations in modern education studies. The concept describes the conflicting pressures within national education structures to promote internationalization and a global gaze, while also seeking to remain locally relevant and a primary contributor to national projects of economic development, social cohesion and nation building. The concept was developed for application in the context of education policy studies in 2020 by Claire Maxwell, Miri Yemini, Ewan Wright, Laura Engel, and Moosung Lee to analyze the complexities of modern educational policies and education reform agendas.

== The Origins ==
The concept arose from mounting evidence of the interweaving of national and global elements in education policy. It bridges two traditionally opposing educational approaches: nationalism and cosmopolitanism.

Nationalism in education emphasizes collective identity formation through shared territory, historical experiences, and future vision. Educational institutions historically served and continue to serve as key instruments for building and maintaining national identity. Conversely, cosmopolitanism promotes global perspectives, aiming to develop students' international mindsets, cross-cultural competencies, and universal values. The cosmopolitan approach emphasizes human rights, global equity, and peaceful international relations, presenting an alternative to both nationalist isolationism and neoliberal globalization.

== Cosmopolitan Nationalism as a framework ==
Cosmopolitan nationalism may serve as an analytical tool alongside established concepts like policy borrowing and policy convergence. The framework introduces a two-dimensional grid mapping educational policies along both national identity preservation and global standard adoption axes. This allows researchers to categorize and analyze different approaches and responses to educational internationalization.

The framework's practical application faces some methodological challenges, particularly in operationalizing and measuring the degrees of nationalism and cosmopolitanism in educational policies. These limitations currently restrict its analytical utility beyond descriptive case studies, though ongoing research continues to refine measurement approaches and expand its applications.

An announced 2024 special issue of Discourse: Studies in the Cultural Politics of Education will examine applications and critiques of cosmopolitan nationalism., and will be published in February 2025. By December 2024, published papers from the issue demonstrate that cosmopolitan nationalism extends beyond educational policy analysis by encompassing institutional practices and ideological frameworks within educational settings.

The research covered diverse contexts across China., Ecuador, Morocco, Japan and South Korea, demonstrating the concept's applicability across different cultural, economic, and political settings. While some research focused on international schools and International Baccalaureate (IB) programs, others extended analysis to higher education institutions

Scholars applied the concept of cosmopolitan nationalism to examine institutional practices and ideological foundations beyond education policy analysis. The studies incorporated theoretical perspectives from research on globalization by Fazal Rizvi and Bob Lingard, educational nationalism by Daniel Tröhler, and cosmopolitanism by Ulf Hannerz. Additional theoretical frameworks, including those developed by Michel Foucault, were integrated to enhance analytical depth.

== Examples of Cosmopolitan Nationalism ==
Researchers have utilized cosmopolitan nationalism as an analytical framework to examine the various ways that educational trends are characterized by complex interplays between national priorities and the pressures to internationalize and adhere to global standards. Cases across different educational systems demonstrate how cosmopolitan nationalism manifests in policy, programming, and practice, such as, for example, the focus on how national educational objectives are aligned with international education objectives in IB programs.

- China maintains 267 International Baccalaureate schools, including 31 public institutions, under strict government oversight to ensure alignment with national educational objectives while providing international education.
- Israel integrates International Baccalaureate programs to improve national education standards and enhance global reputation while using IB's neutral framework to promote dialogue between Jewish and Arab students.
- The United Kingdom's post-Brexit Turing Scheme (replacement for Erasmus+) demonstrates limitations of cosmopolitan nationalism, as it prioritizes national economic interests over developing cosmopolitan competencies.
