= Gwyneth ten Raa =

Luxembourgish alpine skier (born 2005)

Personal information
- Born: 11 May 2005 (age 21) Wiltz, Luxembourg
- Website: gwynethtenraa.lu

Skiing career
- Country: Luxembourg
- Sport: Alpine skiing
- Club: Hiversport
- Disciplines: Giant slalom, slalom

Olympics
- Teams: 2 – (2022, 2026)
- Medals: 0

World Championships
- Teams: 2 – (2023, 2025)
- Medals: 0

Gwyneth ten Raa (born 11 May 2005) is a Luxembourgish alpine ski racer.

== Career ==
Gwyneth ten Raa was born in Wiltz, Luxembourg and began learning to ski at the age of three. She trains and skis in Italy and Switzerland, as Luxembourg has no alpine skiing facilities.

She competed in her first FIS race in November 2021 in Italy.

In 2022, at the age of 16, ten Raa was named to her first Olympic team for the Beijing Games, one of only two athletes in the Luxembourg delegation along with fellow alpine skier Matthieu Osch. ten Raa served as co-flagbearer for Luxembourg during the opening ceremonies, along with Osch. She competed in both slalom and giant slalom in Beijing, with the result of did not finish (DNF) in both races.

Ten Raa made her Europa Cup debut in November 2022 and earned her first points on that tour in December 2025.

In 2024, ten Raa became national champion in giant slalom, finishing ahead of her sister Joyce in second place.

Ten Raa was named to her second Olympics for the 2026 Games in Milan-Cortina, and was Luxembourg's sole female competitor at the Games for the second straight Winter Olympics.

== Personal life ==
Since 2024, ten Raa has served in the Luxembourg Armed Forces.

Gwyneth's sister, Joyce, is also a ski racer.

== Results ==
=== Olympic Games ===
Year
Year	Age	Slalom	Giant slalom	Super-G	Downhill	Combined	Team combined	Team event
2022	16	DNF1	DNF1	—	—	—	—N/a	—
2026	20	DNF1	30	—	—	—N/a	—	—N/a

=== World Championships ===
Year
Year	Age	Slalom	Giant slalom	Super-G	Downhill	Combined	Team combined	Parallel	Team event
2023	17	39	37	—	—	—	—N/a	—	—
2025	19	DNF1	36	—	—	—N/a	—	—N/a	—

=== Junior World Championships ===
- Haute-Savoie 2024: 35th giant slalom, DNF slalom

=== European Youth Olympic Winter Festival ===
- Tarvisio 2023: 10th slalom, 16th Super-G, DNF slalom

=== Other results ===
- Luxembourg national champion in giant slalom (2024)
- 2 wins and 11 podiums in FIS ski races
