= Luxembourg at the 2014 Winter Olympics =

- The flag of Luxembourg
- IOC code: LUX
- NOC: Luxembourg Olympic and Sporting Committee
- Website: www.teamletzebuerg.lu (in French)

in Sochi
- Competitors: 1 (man) in 1 sport
- Flag bearer: Kari Peters
- Medals: Gold 0 Silver 0 Bronze 0 Total 0

Winter Olympics appearances (overview)
- 1928; 1932; 1936; 1948–1984; 1988; 1992; 1994; 1998; 2002; 2006; 2010; 2014; 2018; 2022; 2026; 2030

Luxembourg sent a delegation to compete at the 2014 Winter Olympics in Sochi, Russia from 7–23 February 2014. This was Luxembourg's eighth appearance at a Winter Olympic Games. The Luxembourgian team consisted of one athlete in cross-country skiing, Kari Peters. In the only event he contested, the men's sprint, he finished in 79th place. He withdrew from the 15 km classical due to illness.

== Background ==
Luxembourg first joined Olympic competition at the 1900 Summer Olympics and first participated at the Winter Olympic Games at the 1928 Winter Olympics. Their participation at Winter Olympics since has been sporadic; Luxembourg did not send a delegation to any Winter Olympics from 1948 to 1984. They also skipped the 2002 and the 2010 Winter Olympics. This was Luxembourg's eighth appearance at a Winter Olympics. In their history, Luxembourg has won medals at both the Summer and Winter Olympics; their Winter Olympics medals, both silver, were won in 1992. According to the quota allocation released on 20 January 2014, Luxembourg had one athlete in qualification position for alpine skiing and one for cross-country skiing, however, no alpine skiers were selected for the final Luxembourgian team. The final Luxembourgian team consisted of one cross-country skier, Kari Peters. He was selected as the flag bearer for the opening ceremony, while a volunteer carried the Luxembourg flag for the closing ceremony.

== Cross-country skiing ==
Kari Peters was named as the athlete to represent the country after he met the standards of the Luxembourgish Olympic and Sporting Committee. Peters was the first ever athlete to qualify in cross-country skiing for the country. He was 28 years old at the time of the Sochi Olympics. On 11 February he took part in the men's sprint, posting a time of 4 minutes and 13.08 seconds. This time put him in 79th place out of 85 competitors who finished the race. Only the top 30 finishers were allowed to advance to the next round, and Peters was therefore eliminated; the slowest qualifying time was 3 minutes and 37.88 seconds. The gold medal was won by Ola Vigen Hattestad of Norway, silver was won by Teodor Peterson, and bronze by Emil Jönsson, both of Sweden. Peters was also scheduled to compete in the 15 kilometre classical event held on 14 February, but withdrew due to suffering from a severe cold. Peters confirmed with the withdrawal that his Olympics were over.

Sprint

Athlete	Event	Qualification		Quarterfinal		Semifinal		Final	
Athlete	Event	Time	Rank	Time	Rank	Time	Rank	Time	Rank
Kari Peters	Men's sprint	4:13.08	79	did not advance					
Kari Peters	Men's 15 km classical	N/A						DNS	

== See also ==
- Luxembourg at the 2014 Summer Youth Olympics
