= 1992 Winter Olympics medal table =

1992 Winter Olympics medals
- Location: Albertville, France

Highlights
- Most gold medals: Germany (10)
- Most total medals: Germany (26)
- Medalling NOCs: 20

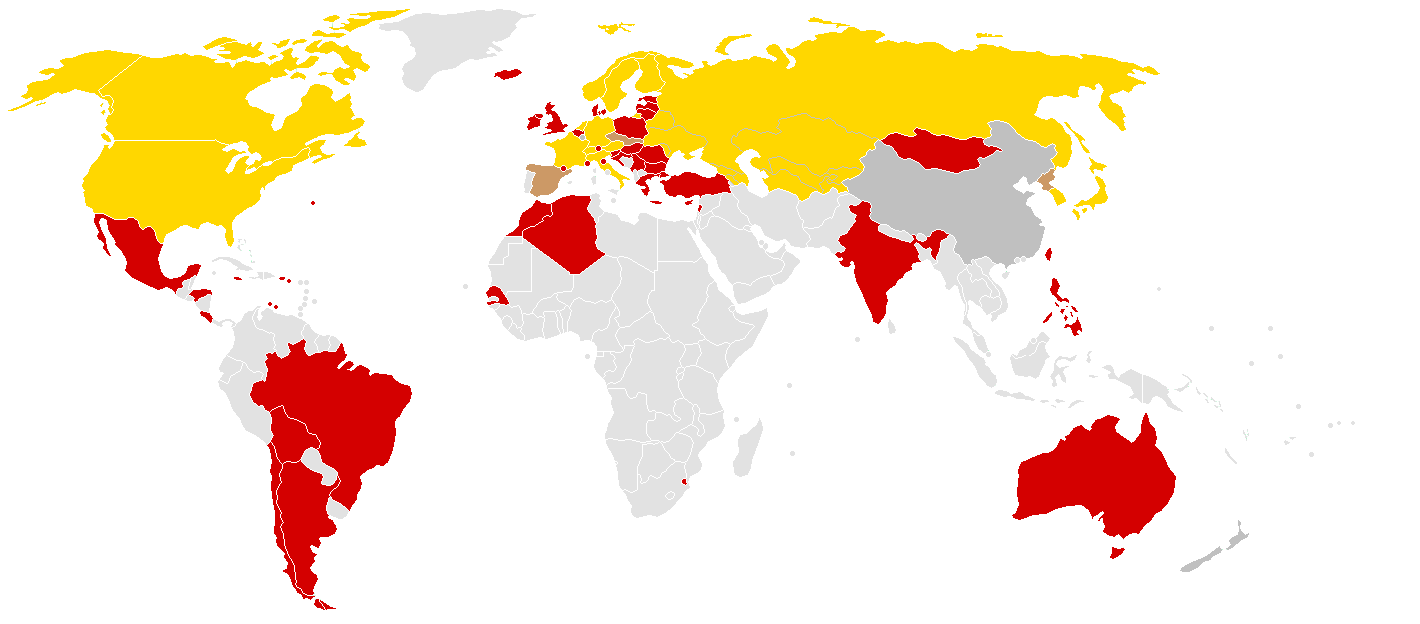
1992 Winter Olympic Games Medals map Legend: Gold represents countries that won at least one gold medal Silver represents countries that won at least one silver medal Bronze represents countries that won at least one bronze medal Red represents countries that did not win any medals Grey represents countries that did not participate

The 1992 Winter Olympics, officially known as the XVI Olympic Winter Games, were a winter multi-sport event held in Albertville, France, from February 8 to 23. A total of 1,801 athletes representing 64 National Olympic Committees (NOCs) (+7 from 1988 Olympics) participated in 57 events (+11 from 1988) from 12 different sports and disciplines (+2 from 1988). In a break from tradition, the medals were primarily made of crystal rather than metal: gold, silver, or bronze was used only on the border.

Athletes from 20 NOCs won at least one medal, and athletes from 14 secured at least one gold medal. Making their first Olympic appearance since German reunification in 1990, Germany led in both gold and overall medals, with 10 and 26 respectively. The Unified Team, consisting of athletes from six former Soviet republics, was second in both categories, with 9 gold and 23 overall medals. Four nations won their first Winter Olympic medal in Albertville. South Korea won the country's first Winter Olympic medal—a gold—when Kim Ki-hoon came first in the newly introduced Olympic sport of short track speed skating. Silver medal-winning slalom skier Annelise Coberger—in addition to winning New Zealand's first Winter Olympic medal—became the first athlete from the Southern Hemisphere to win a medal at the Winter Olympics. Speed skater Ye Qiaobo of the People's Republic of China and alpine skier Marc Girardelli of Luxembourg also won their countries first ever Winter Olympic medals in Albertville. Croatia and Slovenia participated at their first Olympic Games as independent nations after seceding from Yugoslavia, though neither won a medal.

Two athletes, both cross-country skiers for the Unified Team, tied for the most medals for an individual athlete with five each. Lyubov Yegorova won three gold and two silver medals, while Yelena Välbe won one gold and four bronze medals. Ski jumper Toni Nieminen of Finland became the youngest male to win a gold medal in the Winter Olympics at the age of 16.

== Medal table ==
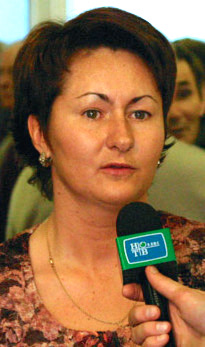
Yelena Välbe won five medals in Albertville

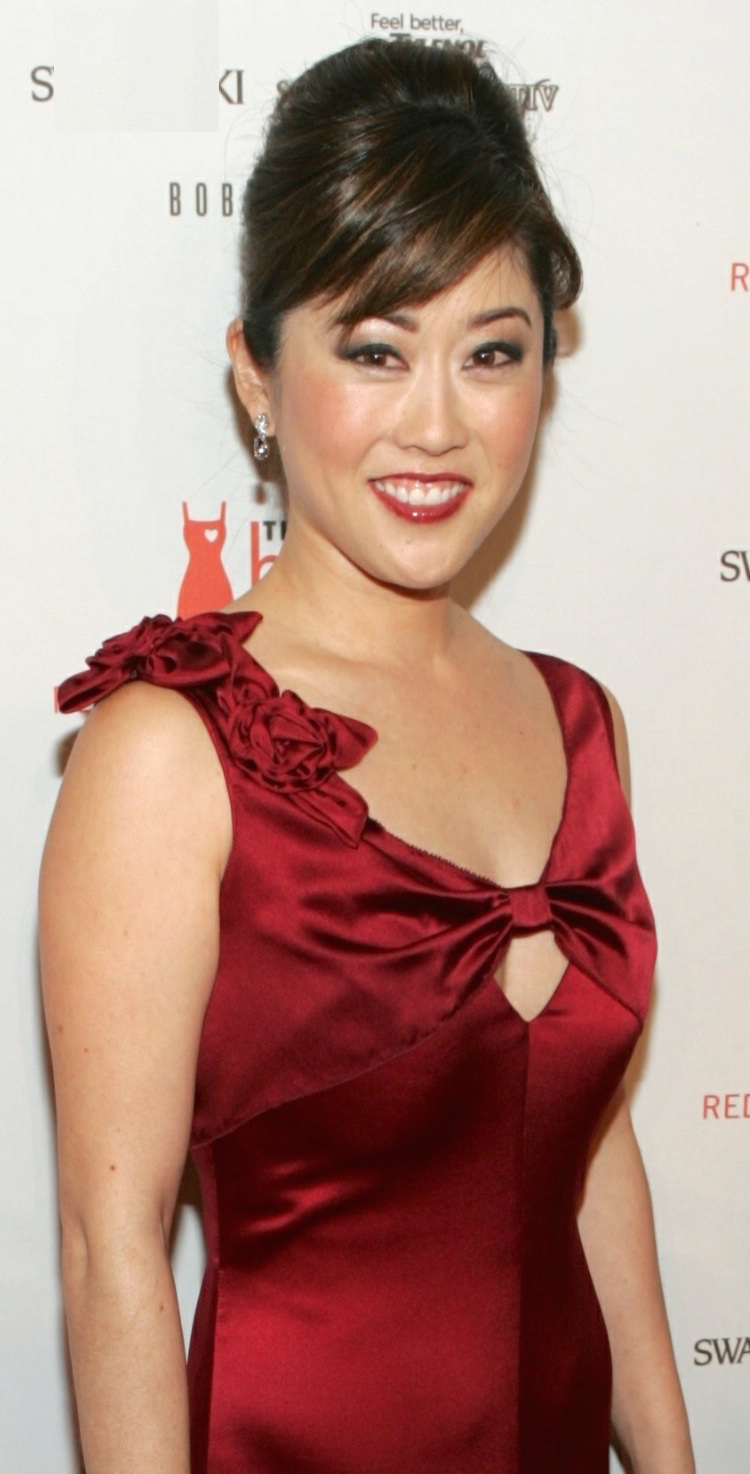
Kristi Yamaguchi won the gold medal in ladies' figure skating in Albertville

The medal table is based on information provided by the International Olympic Committee (IOC) and is consistent with IOC convention in its published medal tables. The table uses the Olympic medal table sorting method. By default, the table is ordered by the number of gold medals the athletes from a nation have won, where a nation is an entity represented by a National Olympic Committee (NOC). The number of silver medals is taken into consideration next, and then the number of bronze medals. If teams are still tied, equal ranking is given and they are listed alphabetically by their IOC country code. Medals won in team competitions—such as ice hockey—are counted only once, no matter how many athletes won medals as part of the team.

In the women's giant slalom alpine skiing event, two silver medals were awarded for a second place tie, so no bronze medal was awarded for that event.

* Host nation (France)

Rank	Nation	Gold	Silver	Bronze	Total
1	Germany	10	10	6	26
2	Unified Team	9	6	8	23
3	Norway	9	6	5	20
4	Austria	6	7	8	21
5	United States	5	4	2	11
6	Italy	4	6	4	14
7	France*	3	5	1	9
8	Finland	3	1	3	7
9	Canada	2	3	2	7
10	South Korea	2	1	1	4
11	Japan	1	2	4	7
12	Netherlands	1	1	2	4
13	Sweden	1	0	3	4
14	Switzerland	1	0	2	3
15	China	0	3	0	3
16	Luxembourg	0	2	0	2
17	New Zealand	0	1	0	1
18	Czechoslovakia	0	0	3	3
19	North Korea	0	0	1	1
19	Spain	0	0	1	1
Totals (20 entries)		57	58	56	171

== See also ==
- 1992 Winter Paralympics medal table
- 1992 Summer Olympics medal table
