= Luxembourg at the 1988 Winter Olympics =

- IOC code: LUX
- NOC: Luxembourg Olympic and Sporting Committee
- Website: www.teamletzebuerg.lu (in French)

in Calgary
- Competitors: 1 (man) in 1 sport
- Flag bearer: Armand Wagener
- Medals: Gold 0 Silver 0 Bronze 0 Total 0

Winter Olympics appearances (overview)
- 1928; 1932; 1936; 1948–1984; 1988; 1992; 1994; 1998; 2002; 2006; 2010; 2014; 2018; 2022; 2026

Luxembourg competed at the 1988 Winter Olympics in Calgary, Alberta, Canada from 13–28 February 1988. It had been 52 years since the last time the nation had participated in the Winter Olympic Games, and Calgary was only their third appearance at a Winter Olympics in history. The Luxembourgian delegation consisted of a single alpine skier, the Austrian-born Marc Girardelli. His best performance was 9th in the downhill race, and Luxembourg did not win any medals at these Olympics.

== Background ==
Luxembourg first joined Olympic competition at the 1900 Summer Olympics and first participated at the Winter Olympic Games at the 1928 Winter Olympics. Their participation at Winter Olympics since has been sporadic, Luxembourg did not send a delegation to any Winter Olympics from 1948 to 1984, and thus it had been 52 years since Luxembourg's last appearance. The 1988 Winter Olympics were held from 13–28 February 1988. Marc Girardelli was the only athlete sent to Calgary by Luxembourg. Armand Wagener was the flag bearer for the opening ceremony.

== Competitors ==
The following is the list of number of competitors in the Games.

| Sport | Men | Women | Total |
|---|---|---|---|
| Alpine skiing | 1 | 0 | 1 |
| Total | 1 | 0 | 1 |

== Alpine skiing ==
Marc Girardelli was 24 years old at the time of the Calgary Olympics, which were his Olympic debut. Considered a "dominant figure" in alpine skiing, the Austrian-born Girardelli had been forced to miss the 1980 and 1984 Winter Olympics over issues with his citizenship. Coming into the Calgary Olympics, he was recently released from the hospital following a "disastrous crash" three weeks before the Olympics. The downhill was held on 15 February, in this single-run race Girardelli posted a time of 2 minutes and 2.59 seconds, which put him in ninth place. On 21 February, he failed to finish the only run of the Super-G. The giant slalom, held on 25 February, was a two-run race. In the first run, Girardelli posted a time of 1 minute and 7.79 seconds. He went faster in the second run, completing the course in 1 minute and 4 seconds. His total time of 2 minutes and 11.79 seconds put him in 20th place for the competition. Four years later, at the 1992 Winter Olympics he would win two silver medals for Luxembourg.

| Athlete | Event | Race 1 | Race 2 | Total | |
| Athlete | Event | Time | Time | Time | Rank |
|---|---|---|---|---|---|
| Marc Girardelli | Downhill | | | 2:02.59 | 9 |
| Marc Girardelli | Super-G | | | DNF | – |
| Marc Girardelli | Giant slalom | 1:07.79 | 1:04.00 | 2:11.79 | 20 |

== See also ==
- Luxembourg at the 1988 Summer Olympics
