= Luxembourg at the 1994 Winter Olympics =

- The flag of Luxembourg
- IOC code: LUX
- NOC: Luxembourg Olympic and Sporting Committee
- Website: www.teamletzebuerg.lu (in French)

in Lillehammer
- Competitors: 1 (man) in 1 sport
- Flag bearer: Georges Diderich
- Medals: Gold 0 Silver 0 Bronze 0 Total 0

Winter Olympics appearances (overview)
- 1928; 1932; 1936; 1948–1984; 1988; 1992; 1994; 1998; 2002; 2006; 2010; 2014; 2018; 2022; 2026

Luxembourg sent a delegation to compete at the 1994 Winter Olympics in Lillehammer, Norway from 12–27 February 1994. The nation was making its fifth appearance at a Winter Olympic Games. The Luxembourgian delegation to Lillehammer consisted of a single athlete, alpine skier Marc Girardelli. His best performance in any event was fourth in the Super-G; he also finished fifth in the downhill and ninth in the combined. As well, he failed to finish the giant slalom, and was disqualified from the slalom.

== Background ==
Luxembourg first joined Olympic competition at the 1900 Summer Olympics and first participated at the Winter Olympic Games at the 1928 Winter Olympics. Their participation at Winter Olympics since has been sporadic, Luxembourg did not send a delegation to any Winter Olympics from 1948 to 1984. Lillehammer marked their fifth appearance at a Winter Olympics, and their only Winter Olympic medals as of 2018 are two silver medals from the immediately preceding 1992 Winter Olympics. The 1994 Winter Olympics were held from 12–27 February 1994, a total of 1,713 athletes competed, representing 67 National Olympic Committees. Georges Diderich served as the chef de mission of the Luxembourgian delegation to Lillehammer, and the competitive delegation consisted of a single athlete, alpine skier Marc Girardelli. Diderich served as the flag bearer for the opening ceremony.

== Competitors ==
The following is the list of number of competitors in the Games.

Sport	Men	Women	Total
Alpine skiing	1	0	1
Total	1	0	1

== Alpine skiing ==
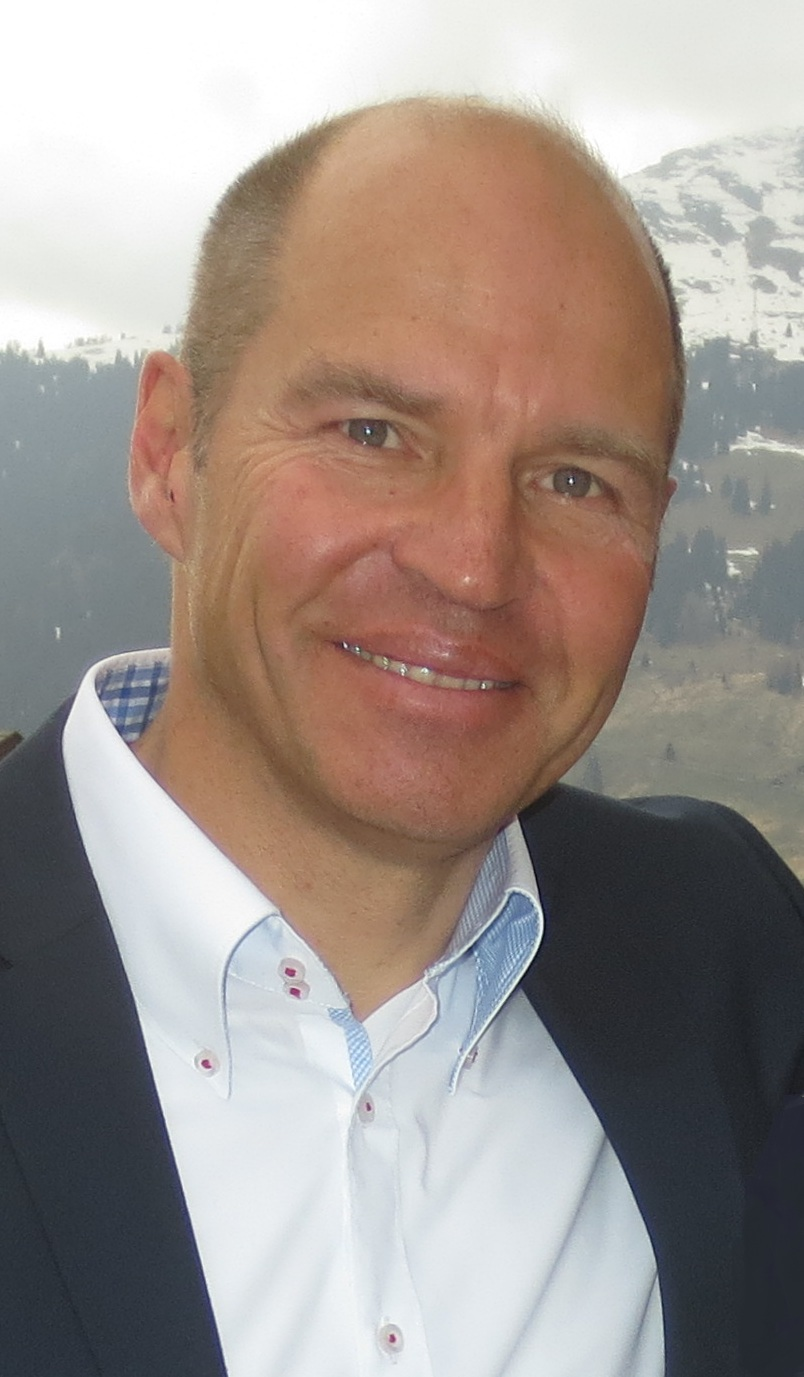
Girardelli skied his last Olympic races in Lillehammer.

Marc Girardelli was returning to Olympic competition after representing Luxembourg at the 1988 Winter Olympics in Calgary, Canada and in 1992 in Albertville, France. In Albertville, he had won two silver medals by finishing second in the Super-G and the giant slalom. He was 30 years old at the time of the Lillehammer Olympics. On 13 February he took part in the downhill, finishing the race in a time of 1 minute and 46.01 seconds, which put him in fifth position and a mere twenty two-tenths of a second out of bronze medal position. The gold medal was won by Tommy Moe of the United States in 1 minute and 45.75 seconds, the silver by Kjetil André Aamodt of Norway, and the bronze by Ed Podivinsky of Canada. The Combined was held on 14–15 February, with a downhill run on the 14th, and two slalom runs on the 15th. He finished the downhill run of the event in 1 minute and 37.61 seconds, and was ranked seventh. The next day, he finished the slalom runs in times of 53.35 seconds and 49.51 seconds, making his total time for the event 3 minutes and 20.47 seconds, which put him in 9th place out of 33 classified finishers. In this event, the gold medal was won by Lasse Kjus, the silver by Aamodt, and the bronze was taken by Harald Strand Nilsen in a Norwegian sweep of the podium.

The single run Super-G event was held on 17 February, and Girardelli finished the race in a time of 1 minute and 33.07 seconds, and only fourteen-tenths of a second out of bronze medal position; the gold medal was won by Markus Wasmeier of Germany in 1 minute and 32.53 seconds, the silver was taken by Moe, and the bronze was won by Aamodt. The giant slalom was held on 23 February, and Girardelli failed to finish the first run of the two run race, eliminating himself from the competition. The giant slalom medals were won by Wasmeier in gold medal position, Urs Kälin of Switzerland in silver, and bronze was taken by Christian Mayer of Austria. Girardelli's fifth and final race was the slalom on 27 February, but he was disqualified during the first run for missing gate 12 of 74. The medals for the slalom were won by Thomas Stangassinger of Austria in gold medal position, Alberto Tomba of Italy in silver, and Jure Košir of Slovenia in bronze. Lillehammer would turn out to be Girardelli's final Olympic appearance.

Athlete	Event	Race 1	Race 2	Total	
Athlete	Event	Time	Time	Time	Rank
Marc Girardelli	Downhill			1:46.09	5
Marc Girardelli	Super-G			1:33.07	4
Marc Girardelli	Giant Slalom	DNF	–	DNF	–
Marc Girardelli	Slalom	DSQ	–	DSQ	–

Athlete	Event	Downhill	Slalom		Total	
Athlete	Event	Time	Time 1	Time 2	Total time	Rank
Marc Girardelli	Combined	1:37.61	53.35	49.51	3:20.47	9
