= Figure skating at the 2006 Winter Olympics – Women's singles =

Women’s singles at the XX Olympic Winter Games
- Venue: Torino Palavela; Turin, Italy
- Dates: 21 and 23 February 2006
- Competitors: 29 from 19 nations
- Winning score: 191.34

Medalists
1st place, gold medalist(s)		Shizuka Arakawa	Japan
2nd place, silver medalist(s)		Sasha Cohen	United States
3rd place, bronze medalist(s)		Irina Slutskaya	Russia

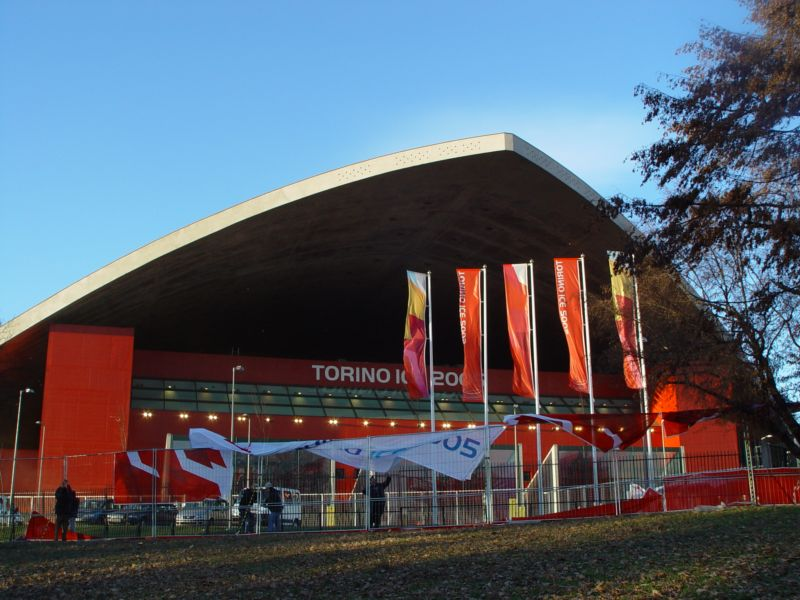
The figure skating events at the 2006 Winter Olympics were held at the Palavela in Turin, Italy.

The women's singles figure skating competition at the 2006 Winter Olympics was held on 21 and 23 February 2006 at the Torino Palavela in Turin, Italy, and featured 29 skaters from 19 different nations. The 2006 Winter Olympics were the first to feature the new ISU Judging System that was developed in the wake of the judging scandal at the 2002 Winter Olympics. Shizuka Arakawa of Japan won the gold medal, Sasha Cohen of the United States won the silver medal, and Irina Slutskaya of Russia won the bronze. Arakawa's gold medal was the first Olympic gold medal in figure skating for Japan and was Japan's only medal at the 2006 Olympics. The women's event was the only figure skating event at the 2006 Olympics that was not won by a skater or team from Russia.

== Background ==
The women's single skating event was one of four figure skating competitions contested at the 2006 Winter Olympics in Turin, Italy. It was held at the Torino Palavela over two nights: the short program took place on 21 February 2006 and the free skating on 23 February 2006. The competition featured 29 skaters representing 19 nations.

Irina Slutskaya of Russia, the reigning world champion who had won the silver medal at the 2002 Winter Olympics, was seen as the leading contender for the gold medal in the women's event. Slutskaya won her seventh European Championship title in January, setting a new record for winning the most European Championship titles in the women's event. Prior to the 2006 Olympics, Slutskaya had only been beaten once since the 2004 World Championships: at the 2003 Grand Prix of Figure Skating Final, where she lost to Mao Asada of Japan. Since Asada was too young to compete at the Olympics, Slutskaya was seen as the favorite. Slutskaya's biggest challenger was expected to be Sasha Cohen of the United States, the two-time World Championship silver medalist who finished in fourth place at the 2002 Olympics. Cohen had most recently won the 2006 U.S. Championships.

Michelle Kwan of the United States, who had won the silver medal at the 1998 Olympics and bronze at the 2002 Olympics, was forced to withdraw from the 2006 Olympics on 12 February after sustaining a groin injury during practice. Kwan had been granted a spot at the Olympics, despite having not competed at the 2006 U.S. Championships due to season-long injuries. Emily Hughes, the younger sister of 2002 Olympic champion Sarah Hughes, took Kwan's place on the American team. Emily Hughes had won the bronze medal at the 2006 U.S. Championships, but had been bumped from the Olympic team when Kwan was granted a medical exemption. Ron Hershberger, then-president of U.S. Figure Skating, described Kwan as "truly a great champion" and said that "she is so widely admired and... adored by... figure skating fans everywhere".

== Qualification ==
Twenty-four quota spots in the women's event were awarded based on the results at the 2005 World Figure Skating Championships. Six additional quota spots were made available at the 2005 Karl Schäfer Memorial. Germany originally qualified one quota spot after the World Championships. However, Germany relinquished that spot when Annette Dytrt failed to meet the proscribed standard set by the German Olympic Sports Confederation, which was at minimum an eighth-place finish at the 2006 European Figure Skating Championships, where Dytrt finished tenth. Sweden also originally qualified one quota spot after the World Championships, but relinquished their spot when Lina Johansson failed to meet the standards set by the Swedish Olympic Committee. Johansson had recently returned from a ten-month break due to injury and only finished twenty-fourth at the European Championships.

Russia sent three women to compete at the Olympics, but Viktoria Volchkova was forced to withdraw on 18 February after developing an infection in her right arm that required hospitalization. No substitute was sent in her place.

Qualifying nations in women's singles
Event	Skaters per NOC	Qualifying NOCs	Total skaters
2005 World Championships	3	~~Russia~~; United States; Japan	21
2005 World Championships	2	Russia; Italy; Finland; Ukraine; Canada; Hungary	21
2005 World Championships	1	Croatia; Switzerland; ~~Germany~~; Australia; ~~Sweden~~	21
2005 Karl Schäfer Memorial	1	China; North Korea; Luxembourg; Georgia; Estonia; Romania; Uzbekistan; Turkey	8
Total			29

== Judging ==
Following the judging scandal at the 2002 Winter Olympics, the International Skating Union (ISU) retired the previous 6.0 system and developed the ISU Judging System, whereby skaters and teams were scored based on a technical grade of execution of the required elements. This new system of judging was used at the 2006 Winter Olympics.

Skaters were judged according to the required technical elements of their program (such as jumps and spins), as well as the overall presentation of their program, based on five program components (skating skills, transitions/linking footwork and movement, performance/execution, choreography/composition, and musical interpretation). Each technical element in a figure skating performance was assigned a predetermined base point value and scored by a panel of nine judges on a scale from −3 to +3 based on the quality of its execution. Each Grade of Execution (GOE) from –3 to +3 was assigned a value as indicated on the Scale of Values. For example, a triple Axel was worth a base value of 7.50 points, and a GOE of +3 was worth 3.00 points, so a triple Axel with a GOE of +3 earned 10.50 points. The judging panel's GOE for each element was determined by calculating the trimmed mean (the average after discarding the highest and lowest scores). The panel's scores for all elements were added together to generate a Total Elements Score. Judges could also choose to award a one-time bonus of 2.00 points for movements deemed unique, special, innovative, or extraordinary. At the same time, the judges evaluated each performance based on the five aforementioned program components and assigned each a score from 0.25 to 10 in 0.25-point increments. The judging panel's final score for each program component was also determined by calculating the trimmed mean. Those scores were then multiplied by the factor shown on the chart below; the results were added together to generate a total Program Component Score.

Program component factoring
Discipline	Short program	Free skate
Women	0.80	1.60

Deductions were applied for certain violations, such as the performance of illegal maneuvers or falls. The Total Elements Score and Program Component Score were then added together, minus any deductions, to generate a final performance score for each skater.

== Results ==
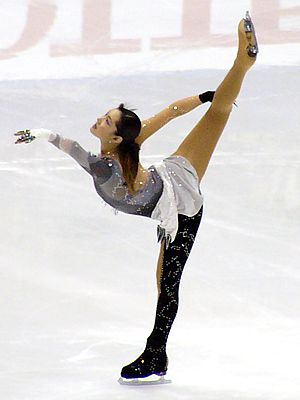
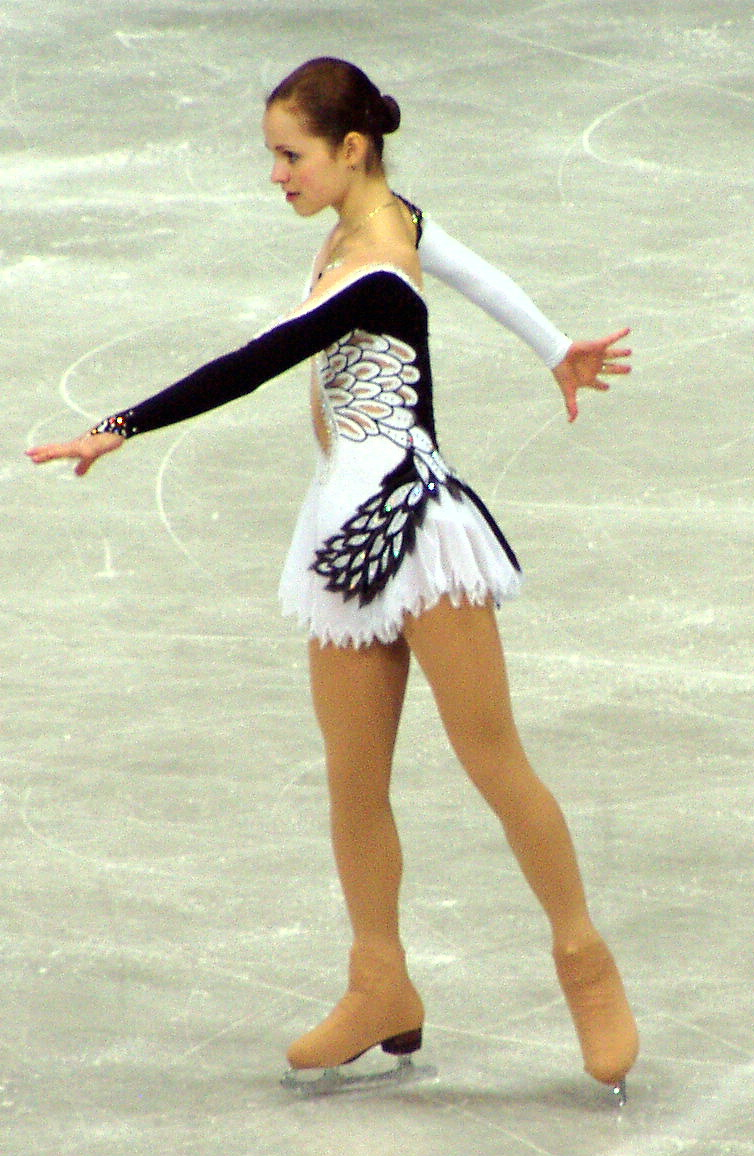
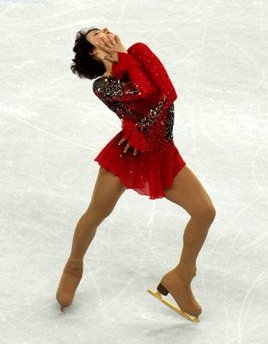
The gold, silver, and bronze medalists from the pairs event at the 2006 Winter Olympics (from left to right):
Shizuka Arakawa of Japan (gold), Sasha Cohen of the United States (silver), and Irina Slutskaya of Russia (bronze)

Code key

- TSS – Total Segment Score
- TES – Total Elements Score
- PCS – Program Component Score
- SS – Skating skills
- TR – Transitions
- PE – Performance
- CH – Choreography
- IN – Musical interpretation
- DED – Deductions

=== Short program ===
The women's short program was held on 21 February.

Women's short program results
Pl.	Skater	Nation	TSS	TES	PCS	SS	TR	PE	CH	IN	DED
1	Sasha Cohen	United States	66.73	35.33	31.40	7.75	7.54	8.00	7.89	8.07	0.00
2	Irina Slutskaya	Russia	66.70	36.21	30.49	7.79	7.21	7.79	7.57	7.75	0.00
3	Shizuka Arakawa	Japan	66.02	35.93	30.09	7.82	7.29	7.57	7.54	7.39	0.00
4	Fumie Suguri	Japan	61.75	32.61	29.14	7.39	7.00	7.32	7.32	7.39	0.00
5	Kimmie Meissner	United States	59.40	34.20	25.20	6.54	6.14	6.21	6.36	6.25	0.00
6	Elene Gedevanishvili	Georgia	57.90	33.25	24.65	6.32	5.89	6.25	6.18	6.18	0.00
7	Emily Hughes	United States	57.08	31.71	25.37	6.46	6.04	6.43	6.32	6.46	0.00
8	Miki Ando	Japan	56.00	29.12	26.88	6.96	6.50	6.64	6.71	6.79	0.00
9	Joannie Rochette	Canada	55.85	28.87	26.98	6.86	6.61	6.71	6.79	6.75	0.00
10	Sarah Meier	Switzerland	55.57	30.69	24.88	6.43	5.89	6.29	6.18	6.32	0.00
11	Carolina Kostner	Italy	53.77	26.25	28.52	7.36	6.93	7.07	7.11	7.18	1.00
12	Susanna Pöykiö	Finland	53.74	28.43	25.31	6.71	6.14	6.25	6.36	6.18	0.00
13	Elena Liashenko	Ukraine	52.35	27.47	24.88	6.39	5.96	6.21	6.18	6.36	0.00
14	Mira Leung	Canada	50.61	29.38	21.23	5.39	5.14	5.32	5.36	5.32	0.00
15	Liu Yan	China	49.84	27.24	22.60	5.86	5.43	5.61	5.71	5.64	0.00
16	Júlia Sebestyén	Hungary	49.58	26.75	23.83	6.25	5.61	5.96	6.04	5.93	1.00
17	Idora Hegel	Croatia	47.06	26.74	20.32	5.21	4.82	5.07	5.18	5.11	0.00
18	Elena Sokolova	Russia	46.69	21.13	25.56	6.64	6.14	6.14	6.46	6.57	0.00
19	Viktória Pavuk	Hungary	46.40	26.78	19.62	4.96	4.71	4.93	5.00	4.93	0.00
20	Kiira Korpi	Finland	44.84	23.84	21.00	5.50	5.00	5.25	5.32	5.18	0.00
21	Fleur Maxwell	Luxembourg	44.53	24.33	20.20	5.04	4.82	5.11	5.14	5.14	0.00
22	Tuğba Karademir	Turkey	44.20	25.70	18.50	4.86	4.36	4.68	4.61	4.61	0.00
23	Silvia Fontana	Italy	42.47	19.87	22.60	5.68	5.32	5.61	5.75	5.89	0.00
24	Galina Efremenko	Ukraine	41.25	20.43	21.82	5.64	5.29	5.50	5.46	5.39	1.00
25	Joanne Carter	Australia	40.86	21.21	20.65	5.46	4.89	5.14	5.21	5.11	1.00
26	Roxana Luca	Romania	39.37	21.49	17.88	4.68	4.29	4.50	4.50	4.39	0.00
27	Kim Yong-suk	North Korea	39.16	19.37	19.79	5.18	4.79	4.89	4.96	4.93	0.00
28	Jelena Glebova	Estonia	38.47	21.06	18.41	4.82	4.36	4.61	4.68	4.54	1.00
29	Anastasia Gimazetdinova	Uzbekistan	38.44	19.06	19.38	5.11	4.68	4.75	4.86	4.82	0.00

=== Free skating ===
Women's free skate results
Pl.	Skater	Nation	TSS	TES	PCS	SS	TR	PE	CH	IN	DED
1	Shizuka Arakawa	Japan	125.32	62.32	63.00	8.04	7.61	7.93	7.86	7.93	0.00
2	Sasha Cohen	United States	116.63	55.22	62.41	7.75	7.57	7.86	7.79	8.04	1.00
3	Irina Slutskaya	Russia	114.74	53.87	61.87	7.96	7.39	7.79	7.71	7.82	1.00
4	Fumie Suguri	Japan	113.48	54.23	59.25	7.54	7.14	7.39	7.43	7.54	0.00
5	Joannie Rochette	Canada	111.42	55.29	56.13	7.07	6.75	7.04	7.11	7.11	0.00
6	Kimmie Meissner	United States	106.31	52.77	53.54	6.86	6.46	6.79	6.64	6.71	0.00
7	Emily Hughes	United States	103.79	53.82	50.97	6.46	6.11	6.50	6.32	6.46	1.00
8	Sarah Meier	Switzerland	100.56	49.31	51.25	6.46	6.21	6.46	6.43	6.46	0.00
9	Carolina Kostner	Italy	99.73	43.84	55.89	7.18	6.71	6.96	7.04	7.04	0.00
10	Elena Sokolova	Russia	95.66	45.38	50.28	6.57	5.96	6.29	6.29	6.32	0.00
11	Liu Yan	China	95.46	50.40	45.06	5.89	5.39	5.61	5.64	5.64	0.00
12	Mira Leung	Canada	94.55	51.83	42.72	5.50	5.11	5.36	5.36	5.36	0.00
13	Elene Gedevanishvili	Georgia	93.56	43.60	49.96	6.43	5.96	6.29	6.36	6.18	0.00
14	Kiira Korpi	Finland	92.36	48.84	43.52	5.71	5.14	5.39	5.50	5.46	0.00
15	Susanna Pöykiö	Finland	89.48	40.54	49.94	6.54	6.00	6.25	6.14	6.29	1.00
16	Miki Ando	Japan	84.20	35.69	50.51	6.64	6.11	6.21	6.29	6.32	2.00
17	Galina Efremenko	Ukraine	84.12	41.70	42.42	5.54	4.96	5.36	5.36	5.29	0.00
18	Elena Liashenko	Ukraine	81.73	36.01	45.72	5.86	5.46	5.71	5.75	5.79	0.00
19	Idora Hegel	Croatia	80.01	39.15	40.86	5.29	4.93	5.07	5.18	5.07	0.00
20	Júlia Sebestyén	Hungary	79.68	34.86	45.82	6.18	5.50	5.57	5.75	5.64	1.00
21	Tugba Karademir	Turkey	79.44	42.64	36.80	4.82	4.21	4.82	4.61	4.54	0.00
22	Silvia Fontana	Italy	77.90	35.67	42.23	5.50	4.82	5.43	5.21	5.43	0.00
23	Viktória Pavuk	Hungary	73.45	36.58	37.87	4.89	4.39	4.82	4.79	4.79	1.00
24	Fleur Maxwell	Luxembourg	65.04	26.77	39.27	4.93	4.68	4.93	4.96	5.04	1.00

=== Overall ===
Women's results
Rank	Skater	Nation	Total	SP		FS	
1st place, gold medalist(s)	Shizuka Arakawa	Japan	191.34	3	66.02	1	125.32
2nd place, silver medalist(s)	Sasha Cohen	United States	183.36	1	66.73	2	116.63
3rd place, bronze medalist(s)	Irina Slutskaya	Russia	181.44	2	66.70	3	114.74
4	Fumie Suguri	Japan	175.23	4	61.75	4	113.48
5	Joannie Rochette	Canada	167.27	9	55.85	5	111.42
6	Kimmie Meissner	United States	165.71	5	59.40	6	106.31
7	Emily Hughes	United States	160.87	7	57.08	7	103.79
8	Sarah Meier	Switzerland	156.13	10	55.57	8	100.56
9	Carolina Kostner	Italy	153.50	11	53.77	9	99.73
10	Elene Gedevanishvili	Georgia	151.46	6	57.90	13	93.56
11	Liu Yan	China	145.30	15	49.84	11	95.46
12	Mira Leung	Canada	145.16	14	50.61	12	94.55
13	Susanna Pöykiö	Finland	143.22	12	53.74	15	89.48
14	Elena Sokolova	Russia	142.35	18	46.69	10	95.66
15	Miki Ando	Japan	140.20	8	56.00	16	84.20
16	Kiira Korpi	Finland	137.20	20	44.84	14	92.36
17	Elena Liashenko	Ukraine	134.08	13	52.35	18	81.73
18	Júlia Sebestyén	Hungary	129.26	16	49.58	20	79.68
19	Idora Hegel	Croatia	127.07	17	47.06	19	80.01
20	Galina Efremenko	Ukraine	125.37	24	41.25	17	84.12
21	Tuğba Karademir	Turkey	123.64	22	44.20	21	79.44
22	Silvia Fontana	Italy	120.37	23	42.47	22	77.90
23	Viktória Pavuk	Hungary	119.85	19	46.40	23	73.45
24	Fleur Maxwell	Luxembourg	109.57	21	44.53	24	65.04
25	Joanne Carter	Australia	40.86	25	40.86	Did not advance to free skate	
26	Roxana Luca	Romania	39.37	26	39.37	Did not advance to free skate	
27	Kim Yong-suk	North Korea	39.16	27	39.16	Did not advance to free skate	
28	Jelena Glebova	Estonia	37.47	28	37.47	Did not advance to free skate	
29	Anastasia Gimazetdinova	Uzbekistan	38.44	29	38.44	Did not advance to free skate	

== Works cited ==
- "Special Regulations – Single & Pair Skating 2004" (PDF). International Skating Union. Archived (PDF) from the original on 16 August 2022.
