= Claire Maxwell (sociologist) =

Professor of sociology (born 1975)

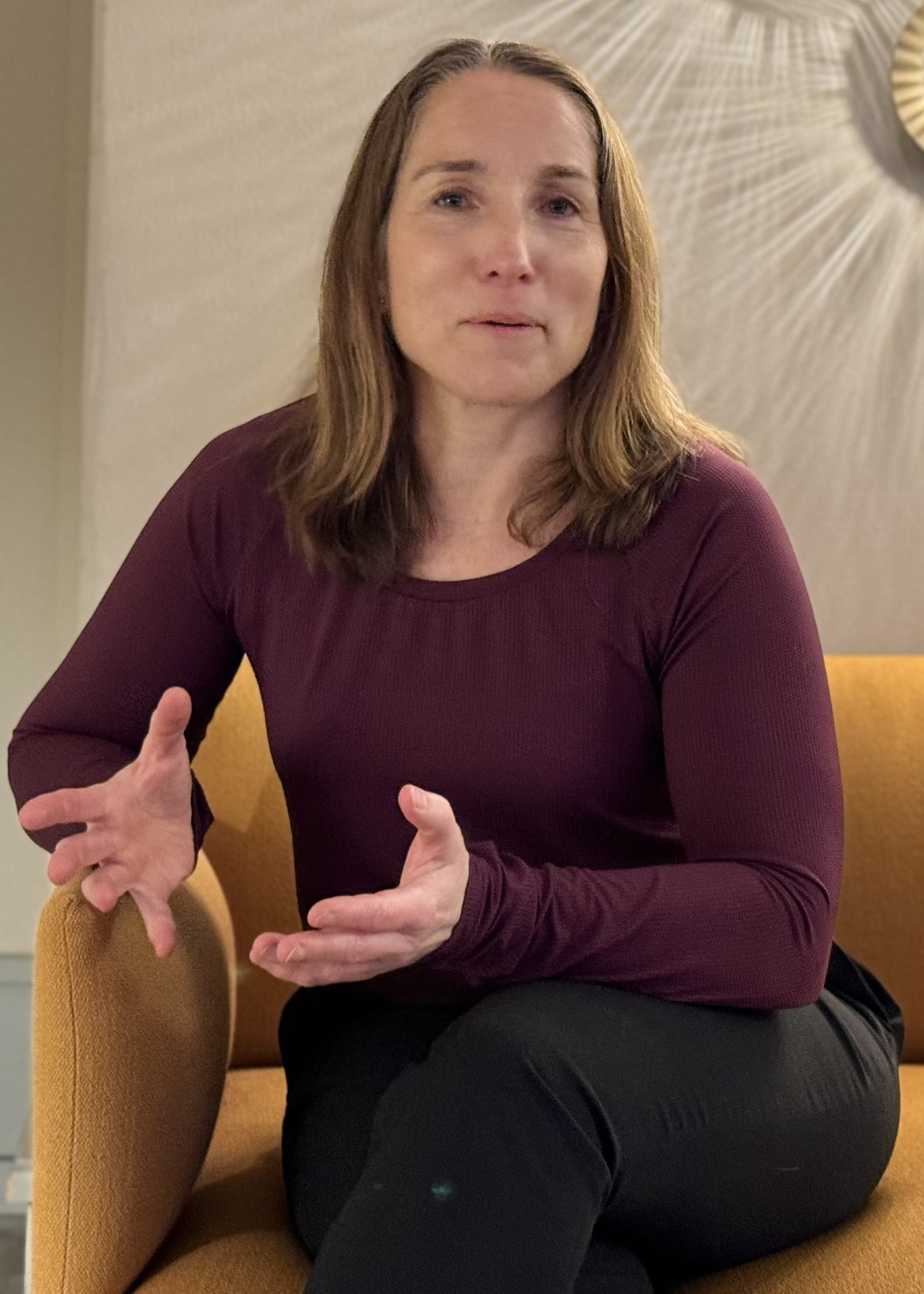
- Claire Maxwell in Copenhagen, 2024
- Born: 28 March 1975 (age 51)
- Education: University of Oxford (MA, MSc); Royal Holloway (PhD)
- Known for: Cosmopolitan nationalism
- Scientific career
- Fields: Sociology of education Sociology of immigration Gender and education
- Workplaces: Deakin University; University of Copenhagen; Institute of Education; University College London
- Thesis: Gender versus ‘vulnerability’: how they determine young people’s sexual and relationship experiences (2005)
- Doctoral advisor: Betsy Stanko
- Website: experts.deakin.edu.au/70924-claire-maxwell

Claire Maxwell is a sociologist specialising in elites, education, mobilities, and migration. As of July 2025, she serves as Head of the School of Humanities and Social Sciences at Deakin University, where she also holds a chair in sociology.

== Early life ==
Maxwell was born and spent her childhood in Luxembourg. She holds Australian and German citizenship, and is fluent in English, German, French, and Danish. She attended the European School in Luxembourg, graduating from its EB programme in 1993.

== Education ==
Maxwell gained a MA degree in PPE from The Queen's College, University of Oxford, in 1996. She returned to Oxford (Green Templeton College and Department of Social Policy and Intervention) for a MSc degree in Applied Social Studies and a postgraduate Diploma in Social Work (PGDipSW).

Maxwell went on to earn a PhD degree in 2005 at Royal Holloway College by defending a thesis titled "Gender versus ‘vulnerability’: how they determine young people's sexual and relationship experiences", supervised by Betsy Stanko.

== Career ==
Maxwell combined her part-time PhD research with public sector employment by Oxfordshire County Council, as a social worker, and a public health specialist and teenage pregnancy co-ordinator for the county.

After her doctorate, Maxwell was employed by the Institute of Education culminating in her appointment as professor in 2018. She subsequently accepted a chair in Sociology at the University of Copenhagen, latterly serving as deputy Head of department. In 2025, she moved to Deakin University in Melbourne.

== Research ==
Maxwell's published research interests include the sociology of education, where she focuses on the internationalisation of education, the role of elite schools around the world, and the effect on education systems of the increased mobility of people across national borders. Maxwell is also a specialist on transnational migration of high-skilled professionals, examining the convertibility of resources in new countries and workplaces.

She has developed and published on several theoretical innovations, highlighting the intersections between agency, affect, and privilege, as well as how the concept of mobile nationalism can describe the practices of transnationally mobile families. The concept of cosmopolitan nationalism has been developed by Maxwell and colleagues to underpin how education sciences can understand education policy and practices.

She has been awarded research funding in the UK by the ESRC and in Denmark by the Danish Innovation Fund and the Independent Research Fund Denmark. Her Google Scholar H index is 34.

== Books and research publications ==
In mid 2027 Maxwell (with co-author Karen Lillie) will publish Insecure Wealth, a book under contract with Princeton University Press. Drawing on an eight year study that followed young people from wealthy families through an elite Swiss boarding school and into early adulthood, the book examines families’ attempts to secure their fortunes across borders and generations. Initial studies from Maxwell and Lillie have argued that wealth and elite schooling do not necessarily secure entry into a global elite: citizenship, race and national origin also shape the young people’s opportunities. An August 2024 piece in The Conversation attracted over 150,000 views.

In March 2023, Bloomsbury published Sociological Foundations of Education, a new and comprehensive overview of how sociology has shaped the study of education, with Maxwell as lead editor and key chapter author.

Maxwell's most recent monograph was published by Routledge in October 2021. It examines why families travel today and focuses on how social class divergence is forged through movements across borders, and how travel has been influenced by the COVID-19 pandemic and climate change.

Maxwell has served as a co-editor of the journal International Studies in Sociology of Education, and as co-editor of Comparative & International Education Society's book series: Education in Global Perspectives, published by SUNY Press. Her work has appeared in numerous academic journals, including Sociology, the Journal of Ethnic and Migration Studies, the British Journal of Sociology of Education, and Globalisation, Societies and Education.

== Media, science communication, and public engagement ==
Maxwell was interviewed on BBC Radio 4's Thinking Allowed in 2016.

She regularly uses LinkedIn to discuss her research and highlight new publications. She has appeared on the FreshEd podcast.

== Public educational service ==
Maxwell has served on the boards of Rygaards International School and Copenhagen International School in Copenhagen, and was also Chair of Governors at West Oxford Community Primary School in the UK.

== Personal life ==
Maxwell lives in Camberwell. The retired figure skater, Olympian and fitness influencer Fleur Maxwell is her youngest sister. Her maternal aunt is the former Australian politician Marjorie Henzell.
