= Fleur Maxwell =

Luxembourgish figure skater

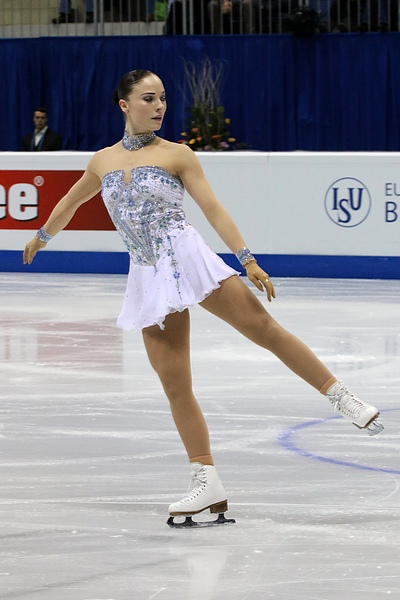
- Maxwell at the 2016 European Championships

Personal information
- Born: 5 August 1988 (age 38) Dudelange, Luxembourg
- Height: 1.58 m (5 ft 2 in)

Figure skating career
- Country: Luxembourg
- Coach: Irina Derbina-Karotom, Igor Lukanin, Vitaliy Danylchenko
- Skating club: Cercle de Patinage Remich
- Began skating: 1998
- Retired: 2017

Fleur Maxwell (born 5 August 1988) is a Luxembourgish former figure skater. She has won nine senior international medals. She reached the free skate at the 2006 Winter Olympics and at six ISU Championships, achieving her highest result, 14th, at the 2005 European Championships.

== Career ==
Maxwell started skating at the age of nine. She debuted on the junior international level in the 2002–03 season. Ranked 32nd at the 2003 World Junior Championships, she placed 18th the following year in The Hague, Netherlands.

Maxwell won the silver medal at the 2004 International Challenge Cup, her senior international debut. Her first senior ISU Championship was the 2005 European Championships in Turin, Italy. She finished 14th at the event and then 29th at the 2005 World Championships. At the Karl Schäfer Memorial in October 2005, Maxwell won the bronze medal and qualified to compete at the Olympics in Turin. As the only Luxembourg competitor at the 2006 Winter Olympics, she was the flag bearer for her country. Placing 21st in the short program, she qualified for the free skate and finished 24th overall in ladies' singles. She then retired from competitive skating.

Maxwell returned to competition in the 2009–10 season. She did not qualify for the 2010 Winter Olympics in Vancouver or the 2014 Winter Olympics in Sochi but won medals at the Istanbul Cup, Slovenia Open, Ukrainian Open, Denkova-Staviski Cup, and NRW Trophy.

Maxwell retired again in 2017 due to a hip injury that eventually required her to undergo a hip replacement at age 32.

Asteroid 255019 Fleurmaxwell, discovered by astronomer Matt Dawson in 2005, was named in her honor, and she is currently the only Luxembourgian Olympian to have an asteroid named after them. The official naming citation was published by the Minor Planet Center on 15 July 2011 (M.P.C. 75550).

== Career post-retirement ==
Since retiring from competitive skating, Maxwell has focused on building a career in personal training. Her brand, named BodyByFleur, claims to be a 'transformational full body fitness method', and has built a substantial social media following, with 14,000 followers on Instagram.

== Personal life ==
Maxwell is of Australian and Danish descent, and she was raised in Luxembourg. Her parents worked as European Civil Servants. The sociologist Claire Maxwell is her eldest sister, and they both attended the European School of Luxembourg. Due to her intense career as a professional figure skater, she often underwent a special program in high-school allowing her to attend classes from Monday to Wednesday and was let free for the remaining two days, but had to make up for what she missed on her own. Her training was from Wednesday to Sunday, and she often had to travel between Paris and Charleville-Mézières to train in different locations.

She currently lives in New York City, having moved after she met her future wife there.

== Programs ==
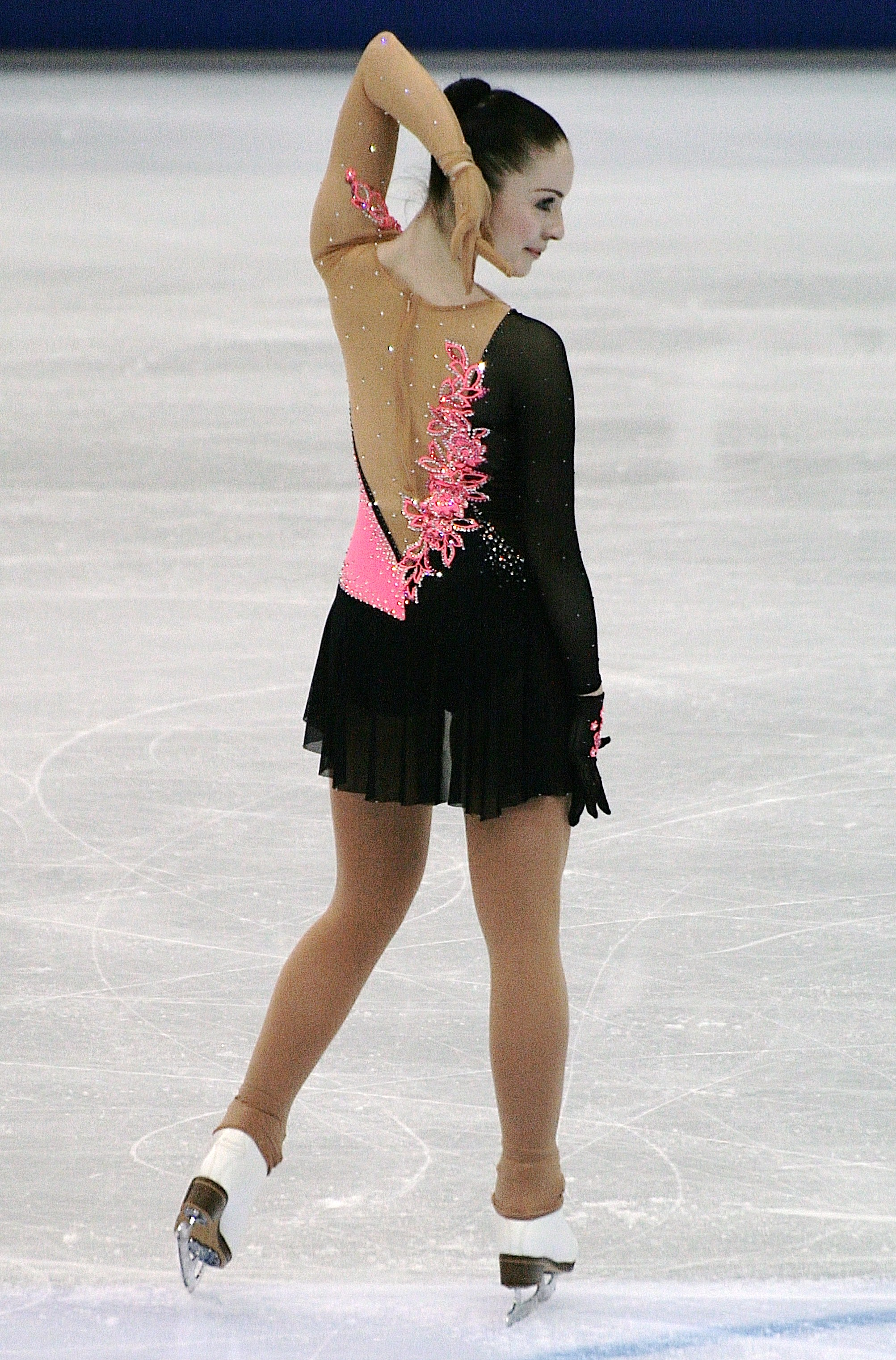
Maxwell in 2012

Season	Short program	Free skating
2017–2018	Charms (from W.E.) by Abel Korzeniowski	The Swan (from The Carnival of the Animals) by Camille Saint-Saëns; Swan Lake Theme by Pyotr Ilyich Tchaikovsky
2015–2016	Take Me to Church by Hozier	The Swan (from The Carnival of the Animals) by Camille Saint-Saëns; Swan Lake Theme by Pyotr Ilyich Tchaikovsky
2013–2015	I'll Stand By You performed by David Garrett	Leo; Ora; DNA; Nightbook by Ludovico Einaudi
2012–2013	With or Without You by U2 performed by 2Cellos	Santa Maria (Del Buen Aire) by Gotan Project; Assassin's Tango (from Mr. & Mrs. Smith) by John Powell; PA Bailar by Dajo Tondo
2011–2012	Nothing Else Matters by Metallica	Santa Maria (Del Buen Aire) by Gotan Project; Assassin's Tango (from Mr. & Mrs. Smith) by John Powell; PA Bailar by Dajo Tondo
2010–2011	Nothing Else Matters by Metallica	Peer Gynt Suite 1 Op. 46 by Edvard Grieg
2009–2010	Khorobushko by Bond	Peer Gynt Suite 1 Op. 46 by Edvard Grieg
2005–2006	Oblivion; Libertango by Astor Piazzolla	Finding Neverland by Jan A. P. Kaczmarek
2004–2005	In the Mood for Love by Shigeru Umebayashi	Cinema Paradiso by Ennio Morricone
2003–2004	In the Mood for Love by Shigeru Umebayashi	Strictly Ballroom by David Hirschfelder; Time After Time by Miles Davis
2002–2003	Tango by Lalo Schifrin	Schindler's List by John Williams; Southern Stream

== Results ==
GP: Grand Prix; CS: Challenger Series; JGP: Junior Grand Prix

International
Event	02–03	03–04	04–05	05–06	09–10	10–11	11–12	12–13	13–14	14–15	15–16
Olympics				24th							
Worlds			29th		33rd		37th				
Europeans			14th	25th	34th	22nd	25th	24th	33rd	20th	18th
GP Bompard				10th							
CS Finlandia										8th	
CS Nebelhorn										8th	
CS Tallinn Trophy											18th
CS U.S. Classic										8th	
Bavarian Open								24th		9th	
Challenge Cup		2nd					10th	15th			
Cup of Nice							23rd	9th	10th		
DS Cup										2nd	
Dubai Golden Cup										1st	
Finlandia								9th			
Gardena								4th			
Golden Spin					WD	10th	7th	12th			
Istanbul Cup							2nd				
Karl Schäfer				3rd							
Nebelhorn					24th			15th	15th		
NRW Trophy					12th	21st		19th		2nd	14th
Merano Cup						9th					
Ondrej Nepela				6th							
Printemps							15th	7th	6th		WD
Santa Claus Cup											3rd
Seibt Memorial								7th		16th	8th
Slovenia Open									3rd		
Sportland Trophy											7th
Tallinn Trophy										4th	
Ukrainian Open									3rd		
Warsaw Cup								4th	6th		
International: Junior
Junior Worlds	32nd	18th									
JGP China	12th										
JGP Croatia		10th									
JGP France	8th		8th								
JGP Germany			9th								
Copenhagen		3rd									
Golden Bear	2nd										
National
Luxembourg		2nd	1st						1st	1st	
Luxem. Junior	1st	1st									
WD = Withdrew
