= Pierre Kaempff =

Luxembourgish bobsledder

Personal information
- Nationality: Luxembourgish
- Born: 1 June 1897; Longuyon, France
- Died: 18 August 1978 (aged 81); Luxembourg, Luxembourg

Sport
- Sport: Bobsleigh

Pierre Kaempff (1 June 1897 – 18 August 1978) was a Luxembourgish bobsledder. He competed in the four-man event at the 1928 Winter Olympics.
