= Marc Schoetter =

Luxembourgish bobsledder

Personal information
- Nationality: Luxembourgish
- Born: 23 October 1889; Bettembourg, Luxembourg
- Died: 27 April 1955 (aged 65); Luxembourg, Luxembourg

Sport
- Sport: Bobsleigh

Marc Schoetter (23 October 1889 – 27 April 1955) was a Luxembourgish bobsledder. He competed in the four-man event at the 1928 Winter Olympics.
