= Matthieu Osch =

Luxembourgish alpine skier (born 1999)

Personal information
- Born: 1 April 1999 (age 27) Luxembourg

Skiing career
- Country: Luxembourg
- Sport: Alpine skiing
- Club: Ashd
- Disciplines: Giant slalom, slalom
- World Cup debut: 23 January 2018 (age 18)

Olympics
- Teams: 3 – (2018, 2022, 2026)
- Medals: 0

World Championships
- Teams: 4 – (2019–2025)
- Medals: 0

World Cup
- Seasons: 2 – (2018–2019)

Matthieu Osch (born 1 April 1999) is a Luxembourgish alpine skier. He is a three-time Olympian for Luxembourg, competing at the 2018, 2022, and 2026 Games. Osch was the flag-bearer for Luxembourg at the 2018 Winter Olympics Parade of Nations.

== Olympic results ==
Year
| Year | Age | Slalom | Giant slalom | Super-G | Downhill | Combined | Team combined | Team event |
| 2018 | 18 | DNF1 | 62 | — | — | — | —N/a | — |
| 2022 | 22 | DNF1 | 28 | — | — | — | —N/a | — |
| 2026 | 26 | 28 | 46 | — | — | —N/a | — | —N/a |

== World Championship results ==
Year
| Year | Age | Slalom | Giant slalom | Super-G | Downhill | Combined | Team combined | Parallel | Team event |
| 2019 | 19 | DNF1 | 47 | — | — | — | —N/a | —N/a | — |
| 2021 | 21 | 28 | 31 | — | — | — | —N/a | — | — |
| 2023 | 23 | 48 | 43 | — | — | — | —N/a | — | — |
| 2025 | 25 | 41 | 49 | — | — | —N/a | — | —N/a | — |
