= Luxembourg at the 2006 Winter Olympics =

- IOC code: LUX
- NOC: Luxembourg Olympic and Sporting Committee
- Website: www.teamletzebuerg.lu (in French)

in Turin
- Competitors: 1 (1 woman) in 1 sport
- Flag bearers: Fleur Maxwell (opening and closing)
- Medals: Gold 0 Silver 0 Bronze 0 Total 0

Winter Olympics appearances (overview)
- 1928; 1932; 1936; 1948–1984; 1988; 1992; 1994; 1998; 2002; 2006; 2010; 2014; 2018; 2022; 2026

Luxembourg sent a delegation to compete in the 2006 Winter Olympics, held in Turin, Italy from 10 to 26 February 2006. Luxembourg returned to the Winter Olympic Games after missing the 2002 Winter Olympics in Salt Lake City. The Luxembourgian delegation consisted of a single figure skater, Fleur Maxwell, making her Olympic debut. In the ladies' singles she finished in 24th place.

== Background ==
Luxembourg first joined Olympic competition at the 1900 Summer Olympics and first participated at the Winter Olympic Games at the 1928 Winter Olympics. Their participation at Winter Olympics since has been sporadic, Luxembourg did not send a delegation to any Winter Olympics from 1948 to 1984. They also skipped the immediately prior Winter Olympics. The Luxembourgian delegation to Turin consisted of a single figure skater, Fleur Maxwell. Georges Diderich served as the chef de mission of the Luxembourgian delegation to Turin. Maxwell was the flag bearer for both the opening ceremony and the closing ceremony.

== Figure skating ==
Fleur Maxwell was 17 years old at the time of the Turin Olympics. She was entered into the ladies' singles event, where the short program was held on 21 February and the free skate on 23 February. In the short program, she skated eighth, and received a score of 44.53 points. This placed her 21st, and as the top 24 were allowed to continue to the free skate, sufficient to advance her to the second night of competition. In the free skate, she was the fourth skater to compete. She scored 65.04 points, which was 24th and last for the session. Her score included a one-point deduction for falling during her program. Each competitor had their final score determined by adding their two scores together, and Maxwell's total score was 109.57 points. This put her in 24th place overall. Maxwell temporarily retired after the 2005–2006 season, and did not return to skating until 2010, though she did not make another Olympics.

Athlete	Event	SP		FS		Total	
Athlete	Event	Points	Rank	Points	Rank	Points	Rank
Fleur Maxwell	Ladies'	44.53	21 Q	65.04	24	109.57	24

Key: FS = Free Skate, SP = Short Program
