= Auguste Hilbert =

Luxembourgish bobsledder (1889–1957)

Personal information
- Nationality: Luxembourgish
- Born: 28 August 1889 Mamer, Luxembourg
- Died: 22 May 1957 (aged 67) Mamer, Luxembourg

Sport
- Sport: Bobsleigh

Auguste Hilbert (28 August 1889 – 22 May 1957) was a Luxembourgish bobsledder. He competed in the four-man event at the 1928 Winter Olympics.
