= Willy Heldenstein =

Luxembourgish bobsledder

Personal information
- Nationality: Luxembourgish
- Born: 4 September 1896; Luxembourg, Luxembourg
- Died: 4 September 1990 (aged 94); Luxembourg, Luxembourg

Sport
- Sport: Bobsleigh

Willy Heldenstein (4 September 1896 – 4 September 1990) was a Luxembourgish bobsledder. He competed in the four-man event at the 1928 Winter Olympics.
