= Raoul Weckbecker =

Luxembourgish bobsledder and alpine skier (1898–1978)

Raoul Weckbecker (16 July 1898 – 6 October 1978) was a Luxembourgish bobsledder and skier.

He competed at the four-man bobsleigh event at the 1928 Winter Olympics, finishing twentieth (out of twenty-three). In 1936, in Garmisch-Partenkirchen, Weckbecker finished 22nd (and last) in the two-man bob competition. He also competed in the alpine skiing combined event at the 1936 Games but did not finish the downhill race.
