= Yves-Matthieu Dafreville =

French judoka (born 1982)

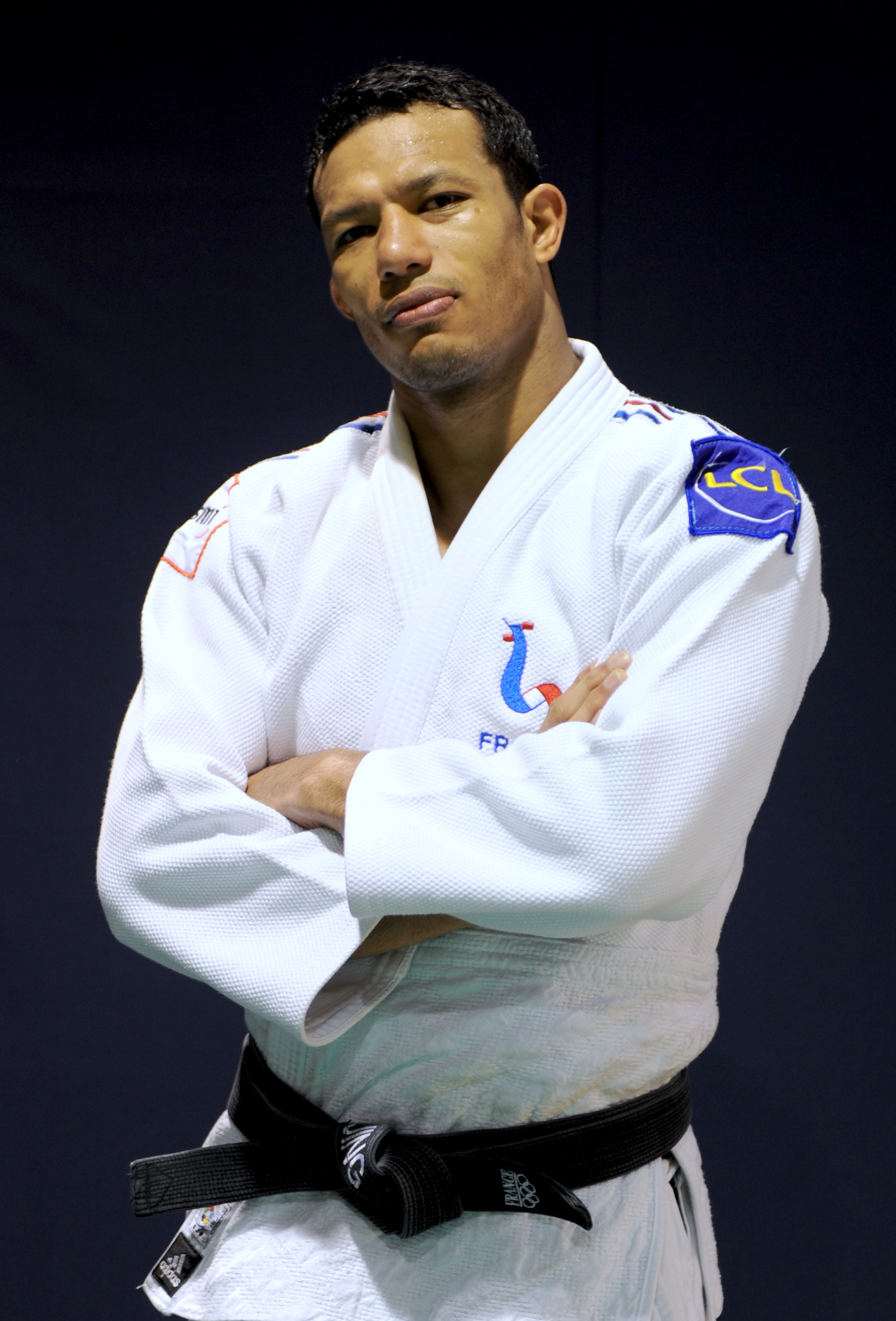
- Yves Matthieu Dafreville-2011

Personal information
- Born: 17 March 1982 (age 44) Saint-Pierre, Réunion
- Occupation: Judoka
- Height: 1.86 m (6 ft 1 in)

Sport
- Country: France
- Sport: Judo
- Weight class: ‍–‍90 kg
- Club: Levallois SC
- Coached by: Patrick Rosso; Stéphane Fremont

Achievements and titles
- Olympic Games: 5th (2008)
- World Champ.: 9th (2007)
- European Champ.: 7th (2008)
Medal record
Men's judo
Representing France
IJF Grand Slam
Gold medal – first place	2009 Paris	‍–‍90 kg
IJF Grand Prix
Gold medal – first place	2009 Hamburg	‍–‍90 kg
Bronze medal – third place	2012 Düsseldorf	‍–‍90 kg

Profile at external databases
- IJF: 4013
- JudoInside.com: 17770
- Updated on 28 November 2022

Yves-Matthieu Dafreville (born 17 March 1982 in Saint-Pierre, Réunion) is a French judoka, who played for the middleweight category. He is also a member of the Levallois Sporting Club in Levallois-Perret, France, and is coached and trained by Patrick Rosso and Stéphane Fremont.

Dafreville represented France at the 2008 Summer Olympics in Beijing, where he competed for the men's middleweight class (90 kg). He defeated Cuba's Asley González, Italy's Roberto Meloni, and Brazil's Eduardo Santos in the preliminaries, before losing out the semi-final match, with an ippon and a kata guruma (shoulder wheel), to Algeria's Amar Benikhlef. Because Benikhlef advanced further into the final match against Georgia's Irakli Tsirekidze, Dafreville automatically qualified for the bronze medal game, where he narrowly lost the medal to Egypt's Hesham Mesbah, who successfully scored an ippon and a Te Guruma (variation of Sukui Nage), at one minute and twenty-nine seconds.

== Achievements ==
Year	Tournament	Place	Weight class
2008	European Championships	7th	Middleweight (90 kg)
