= Mohamed El Assri =

Moroccan judoka (born 1975)

Personal information
- Nationality: Morocco
- Born: 28 August 1975 (age 51)
- Weight: 90 kg (198 lb)

Sport
- Sport: Judo
- Event: 90 kg
Medal record
Men's judo
Representing Morocco
Mediterranean Games
Silver medal – second place	2009 Pescara	90 kg
African Championships
Silver medal – second place	2006 Port Louis	90 kg
Bronze medal – third place	2004 Tunis	90 kg
Bronze medal – third place	2005 Port Elizabeth	90 kg
Bronze medal – third place	2008 Agadir	90 kg
Bronze medal – third place	2011 Dakar	90 kg

Mohamed El Assri (Arabic: محمد العسري; born August 28, 1975) is a Moroccan judoka, who played for the middleweight category. He won a total of five medals (one silver and four bronze) for his division at the African Judo Championships (2004, 2005, 2006, 2008, and 2011). He also captured a silver medal in the 66 kg class at the 2009 Mediterranean Games in Pescara, Italy, losing out to Greece's Ilias Iliadis.

El Assri represented Morocco at the 2008 Summer Olympics in Beijing, where he competed for the men's middleweight class (90 kg). He lost his first preliminary match by a yuko and a deashi harai (advanced foot sweep) to Algeria's Amar Benikhlef. Because his opponent advanced further into the final match, El Assri offered another shot for the bronze medal by defeating Spain's David Alarza in the repechage rounds. He finished only in ninth place, after losing out the second repechage bout to Switzerland's Sergei Aschwanden, who successfully scored a koka and a go-outside-contest-area technique (P16), at the end of the five-minute period.
