= 2008 World Team Judo Championships =

Judo competition

2008 Judo World Team Judo Championships
- Location: Tokyo, Japan
- Dates: 5–6 October

Champions
- Men's team: Georgia
- Women's team: Japan

Competition at external databases
- Links: JudoInside

The 2008 World Team Judo Championships were held in Tokyo, Japan from 5 to 6 October 2008.

== Medal summary ==
Event	Gold	Silver	Bronze
Men's team	Georgia; Nest'or Khergiani; Mindia Khomizuri; Zaza K'edelashvili; Davit Kevkhishvili; Varlam Lip'art'eliani; Irakli Tsirekidze; Lasha Gujejiani	Uzbekistan; Rishod Sobirov; Mirali Sharipov; Avazbek Korganov; Navruz Dzhurakobilov; Khurshid Nabiyev; Utkir Kurbanov; Abdullo Tangriyev	Brazil; Charles Chibana; Denílson Lourenço; Victor Penalber; Flávio Canto; Hugo Pessanha; Leonardo Leite; Daniel Hernandes; Eduardo Santos; Walter Santos
Men's team	Georgia; Nest'or Khergiani; Mindia Khomizuri; Zaza K'edelashvili; Davit Kevkhishvili; Varlam Lip'art'eliani; Irakli Tsirekidze; Lasha Gujejiani	Uzbekistan; Rishod Sobirov; Mirali Sharipov; Avazbek Korganov; Navruz Dzhurakobilov; Khurshid Nabiyev; Utkir Kurbanov; Abdullo Tangriyev	Russia; Yevgeny Kudyakov; Alim Gadanov; Konstantin Zaretsky; Sirazhudin Magomedov; Zafar Makhmadov; Aslan Unashkhotlov; Aleksandr Mikhaylin; Ruslan Kishmakhov; Vyacheslav Mikhaylin
Women's team	Japan; Shizuka Yamaguchi; Misato Nakamura; Kaori Matsumoto; Ayumi Tanimoto; Yoriko Kunihara; Sae Nakazawa; Mika Sugimoto; Emi Yamagishi; Tomoko Fukumi; Yuka Nishida; Yoshie Ueno; Sayaka Anai	France; Laëtitia Payet; Marine Richard; Sarah Loko; Emmanuelle Payet; Magali Leguay; Lucie Louette; Ketty Mathé	China; Xiao Jun; Shi Junjie; Sun Rong; Li Lan; Han Weiyan; Zhang Zhehui; Qin Qian; Liu Xia
Women's team	Japan; Shizuka Yamaguchi; Misato Nakamura; Kaori Matsumoto; Ayumi Tanimoto; Yoriko Kunihara; Sae Nakazawa; Mika Sugimoto; Emi Yamagishi; Tomoko Fukumi; Yuka Nishida; Yoshie Ueno; Sayaka Anai	France; Laëtitia Payet; Marine Richard; Sarah Loko; Emmanuelle Payet; Magali Leguay; Lucie Louette; Ketty Mathé	Germany; Séverine Pesch; Mareen Kräh; Marlen Hein; Claudia Malzahn; Kerstin Thiele; Heide Wollert; Franziska Konitz; Miryam Roper
