= Trezise =

Tresise, sometimes spelled Tresize or Trezise, is a surname of Cornish origin.

The name could originate from any of several Cornish farms or hamlets such as Trezise in the parish of St Martin in Meneage, in west Cornwall, or Tresayes in the parish of Roche, in mid Cornwall. The derivation is from the pre-12th-century Cornish Tre-saws, meaning the place of the Saxons, a reference to English settlers in the county.

One of the earliest documented occurrences of the name is that of Margery Tresise, who was baptized on 1 October 1632 in the village of St. Erth in Cornwall, and whose father was listed as Anthony Tresise. Margery apparently died nine years later and was buried in St Erth on 11 March 1641 but had at least eight siblings, of whom Edward (1640) and Anthony (1643) were the progenitors of many of the current bearers of the name.

Spellings of the surname were often quite fluid and members of the same family would frequently pass on alternative spellings when registering births, deaths, and marriages and responding to censuses.

The 1881 census of England and Wales listed 454 people with surnames that were variants of Tresise, Trezise, etc. Of these, 309 (68%) lived in Cornwall and Devon, 18 (4%) lived in what today would be considered Greater London and the remainder were distributed throughout the country, particularly in Wales and southern England.

Notable people with the name

- Artie Trezise, Scottish folk singer and entertainer
- Ian Trezise (born 1959), Australian rules footballer
- John Tresize (born 1954), Australian rules footballer
- Neil Trezise (1931–2006), Australian politician
- Patrick Trezise (born 1982), South African judoka
- Percy Trezise (1923–2005), Australian art historian
- Rachel Trezise (born 1978), Welsh author
