= 2013 World Judo Championships – Men's 66 kg =

Judo competition

Judo Men's 66 kg at the 2013 World Judo Championships
- Venue: Ginásio do Maracanãzinho
- Location: Rio de Janeiro, Brazil
- Date: 27 August 2013
- Competitors: 66 from 50 nations

Medalists
gold medal	Masashi Ebinuma (2nd title)	Japan
silver medal	Azamat Mukanov	Kazakhstan
bronze medal	Masaaki Fukuoka	Japan
bronze medal	Georgii Zantaraia	Ukraine

Competition at external databases
- Links: IJF • JudoInside

The men's 66 kg competition of the 2013 World Judo Championships was held on August 27.

== Medalists ==
Gold	Silver	Bronze
Masashi Ebinuma (JPN)	Azamat Mukanov (KAZ)	Masaaki Fukuoka (JPN); Georgii Zantaraia (UKR)

== Results ==
=== Pool A ===
First round fights

	Score	
Chong Wei Fu (Malaysia)	000–100	(France) Dimitri Dragin

Second Round
(Mongolia) Davaadorjiin Tömörkhüleg	000
(Ukraine) Georgii Zantaraia	010
(Algeria) Ahmed Mohammedi	100
(Colombia) Fabián González	000
(Kuwait) Mohammad Al-Ajmi	010
(Australia) Steven Brown	100
(Venezuela) Sergio Mattey	002
(Spain) Antonio Jiménez Rodríguez	000
(Israel) Golan Pollack	000
(France) Dimitri Dragin	000
(Portugal) André Soares	000
(Germany) Sebastian Seidl	100
(Azerbaijan) Nijat Shikhalizade	100
(Hungary) Bence Zámbori	000
(Canada) Sasha Mehmedovic	100
(Central African Republic) Arnaud Langate	000

Quarterfinals
(Ukraine) Georgii Zantaraia	000
(Algeria) Ahmed Mohammedi	000
(Australia) Steven Brown	000
(Venezuela) Sergio Mattey	100
(France) Dimitri Dragin	100
(Germany) Sebastian Seidl	000
(Azerbaijan) Nijat Shikhalizade	111
(Canada) Sasha Mehmedovic	000

Semifinals
(Ukraine) Georgii Zantaraia	100
(Venezuela) Sergio Mattey	001
(France) Dimitri Dragin	000
(Azerbaijan) Nijat Shikhalizade	100

Final
(Ukraine) Georgii Zantaraia	110
(Azerbaijan) Nijat Shikhalizade	001

=== Pool B ===
Second Round
(South Korea) Cho Jun-Ho	000
(Brazil) Luiz Revite	000
(China) Li Jiadi	000
(Japan) Masaaki Fukuoka	100
(Armenia) Armen Nazaryan	100
(Vanuatu) Joe Mahit	000
(United States) Bradford Bolen	101
(Uruguay) David Prestes	000
(Georgia (country)) Lasha Shavdatuashvili	102
(North Korea) Choe Yong-Sik	000
(United Kingdom) Colin Oates	001
(Uzbekistan) Rishod Sobirov	000
(Singapore) Joel Tseng	100
(New Zealand) Alister Leat	000
(Russia) Alim Gadanov	000
(Kazakhstan) Azamat Mukanov	101

Quarterfinals
(South Korea) Cho Jun-Ho	000
(Japan) Masaaki Fukuoka	010
(Armenia) Armen Nazaryan	100
(United States) Bradford Bolen	000
(Georgia (country)) Lasha Shavdatuashvili	001
(United Kingdom) Colin Oates	100
(Singapore) Joel Tseng	000
(Kazakhstan) Azamat Mukanov	111

Semifinals
(Japan) Masaaki Fukuoka	000
(Armenia) Armen Nazaryan	000
(United Kingdom) Colin Oates	000
(Kazakhstan) Azamat Mukanov	100

Final
(Japan) Masaaki Fukuoka	000
(Kazakhstan) Azamat Mukanov	100

=== Pool C ===
Second Round
(France) David Larose	001
(Poland) Paweł Zagrodnik	010
(Mozambique) Bruno Luzia	101
(Barbados) Asa Weithers	000
(Portugal) Sergiu Oleinic	000
(Japan) Masashi Ebinuma	101
(Eswatini) Ben Magagula	000
(Venezuela) Ricardo Valderrame	102
(Mongolia) Sanjaasürengiin Miyaaragchaa	010
(Costa Rica) Ian Sancho	000
(Denmark) Thor Nielsen	000
(Algeria) Houd Zourdani	001
(Madagascar) Elie Norbert	000
(Spain) Sugoi Uriarte	100
(Cameroon) Ousmanou Adamou	000
(Kyrgyzstan) Islam Baialinov	100

Quarterfinals
(Poland) Paweł Zagrodnik	100
(Mozambique) Bruno Luzia	001
(Japan) Masashi Ebinuma	100
(Venezuela) Ricardo Valderrame	000
(Mongolia) Sanjaasürengiin Miyaaragchaa	100
(Algeria) Houd Zourdani	000
(Spain) Sugoi Uriarte	000
(Kyrgyzstan) Islam Baialinov	000

Semifinals
(Poland) Paweł Zagrodnik	000
(Japan) Masashi Ebinuma	100
(Mongolia) Sanjaasürengiin Miyaaragchaa	000
(Spain) Sugoi Uriarte	100

Final
(Japan) Masashi Ebinuma	110
(Spain) Sugoi Uriarte	000

=== Pool D ===
First round fights

	Score	
Mikhail Pulyaev (Russia)	101–001	(Ukraine) Gevorg Khachatrian

Second Round
(Kazakhstan) Sergey Lim	000
(Uzbekistan) Mirzahid Farmonov	101
(Zambia) Mathews Punza	000
(Russia) Mikhail Pulyaev	100
(South Africa) Siyabulela Mabulu	010
(Dominican Republic) Wander Mateo	010
(Angola) Helio Zembula	000
(Tajikistan) Rasul Abdusharipov	100
(Brazil) Charles Chibana	100
(Ecuador) Israel Verdugo	000
(Guinea) Mamadou Samba Bah	000
(Canada) Patrick Gagné	100
(Israel) Tal Flicker	000
(China) Qu Guannan	000
(Argentina) Santiago Gualco	000
(Hungary) Zsolt Gorjánácz	100

Quarterfinals
(Uzbekistan) Mirzahid Farmonov	000
(Russia) Mikhail Pulyaev	100
(South Africa) Siyabulela Mabulu	100
(Tajikistan) Rasul Abdusharipov	000
(Brazil) Charles Chibana	110
(Canada) Patrick Gagné	000
(Israel) Tal Flicker	100
(Hungary) Zsolt Gorjánácz	000

Semifinals
(Russia) Mikhail Pulyaev	100
(South Africa) Siyabulela Mabulu	000
(Brazil) Charles Chibana	100
(Israel) Tal Flicker	000

Final
(Russia) Mikhail Pulyaev	000
(Brazil) Charles Chibana	100

=== Finals ===
Semi-finals
(Ukraine) Georgii Zantaraia	000
(Kazakhstan) Azamat Mukanov	010
(Japan) Masashi Ebinuma	110
(Brazil) Charles Chibana	000

Final
(Kazakhstan) Azamat Mukanov	000
(Japan) Masashi Ebinuma	100

=== Repechage ===
Repechage		Third place
(Azerbaijan) Nijat Shikhalizade	000
(Japan) Masaaki Fukuoka	000	(Japan) Masaaki Fukuoka	110
		(Brazil) Charles Chibana	010

Repechage		Third place
(Spain) Sugoi Uriarte	000
(Russia) Mikhail Pulyaev	000	(Russia) Mikhail Pulyaev	000
		(Ukraine) Georgii Zantaraia	100
