= Judo at the 2010 South American Games – Men's 90kg =

Judo competition

The Men's 90 kg event at the 2010 South American Games was held on March 19.

== Medalists ==
Gold	Silver	Bronze
Diego Rosati; Argentina	Jose Gregorio Camacho; Venezuela	Oscar Rey; Colombia; Eduardo Santos; Brazil

== Results ==
=== Main Bracket ===
First Round
Juan Romero (URU)	001H
Jose Gregorio Camacho (VEN)	100^{2}

Quarterfinals
Jose Gregorio Camacho (VEN)	002^{1}
Eduardo Santos (BRA)	000^{2}
Sebastian Sanchez (PAN)	110^{1}
Maurizio Sforza (PAR)	001
Reginald de Windt (AHO)	000
Diego Rosati (ARG)	100
Oscar Eduardo Rey (COL)	000H
Gonzalo Mazuelos (CHI)	100

Semifinals
Jose Gregorio Camacho (VEN)	100^{1}
Sebastian Sanchez (PAN)	000
Diego Rosati (ARG)	120^{2}
Gonzalo Mazuelos (CHI)	001^{3}

Final
Jose Gregorio Camacho (VEN)	001^{3}
Diego Rosati (ARG)	011^{2}

=== Repechage ===
First round
Juan Romero (URU)	000^{1}
Eduardo Santos (BRA)	002^{1}
bye
Maurizio Sforza (PAR)
Reginald de Windt (AHO)
Bye
Oscar Eduardo Rey (COL)
Bye

Second round
Eduardo Santos (BRA)	100
Maurizio Sforza (PAR)	000
Reginald de Windt (AHO)	000
Oscar Eduardo Rey (COL)	100

Bronze medal finals
Eduardo Santos (BRA)	100
Gonzalo Mazuelos (CHI)	000
Oscar Eduardo Rey (COL)	102^{1}
Sebastian Sanchez (PAN)	000^{1}
