= Judo at the 2015 Pan American Games – Men's 66 kg =

Men's 66 kg at the 2015 Pan American Games
- Venue: Mississauga Sports Centre
- Dates: July 12
- Competitors: 10 from 10 nations

Medalists
Gold medal	Charles Chibana	Brazil
Silver medal	Antoine Bouchard	Canada
Bronze medal	Carlos Tondique	Cuba
Bronze medal	Fernando Gonzalez	Argentina

The men's 66 kg competition of the judo events at the 2015 Pan American Games in Toronto, Canada, was held on July 12 at the Mississauga Sports Centre.

== Schedule ==
All times are Central Standard Time (UTC-6).

Date	Time	Round
July 12, 2015	15:30	Preliminary bout
July 12, 2015	15:51	Quarterfinals
July 12, 2015	16:05	Repechage
July 12, 2015	16:54	Semifinals
July 12, 2015	20:00	Bronze medal matches
July 12, 2015	20:14	Final

== Results ==
Legend

- 1st number = Ippon
- 2nd number = Waza-ari
- 3rd number = Yuko

=== Bracket ===
Preliminaries
Israel Verdugo (ECU)	000S1
Sergio Mattey (VEN)	110
Jesus Gavidia (PER)	000S3
Carlos Tondique (CUB)	000S2

Quarter Finals
Charles Chibana (BRA)	100
Gustavo Lopez Aguilera (ESA)	000
Wander Mateo (DOM)	000S1
Sergio Mattey (VEN)	010S3
Antoine Bouchard (CAN)	100
Fernando Gonzalez (ARG)	000S2
Brad Bolen (USA)	000S2
Carlos Tondique (CUB)	101

Semi Finals
Charles Chibana (BRA)	100
Sergio Mattey (VEN)	000
Antoine Bouchard (CAN)	100
Carlos Tondique (CUB)	000

Final
Charles Chibana (BRA)	101
Antoine Bouchard (CAN)	001

=== Repechage round ===
Two bronze medals were awarded.

Repechage		Bronze medal
Gustavo Lopez Aguilera (ESA)	000
Wander Mateo (DOM)	100	Wander Mateo (DOM)	000S1
		Carlos Tondique (CUB)	010S1

Repechage		Bronze medal
Fernando Gonzalez (ARG)	101
Brad Bolen (USA)	001	Fernando Gonzalez (ARG)	100
		Sergio Mattey (VEN)	001
