= Judo at the 2008 Summer Olympics – Men's 90 kg =

Men's 90 kg at the Games of the XXIX Olympiad
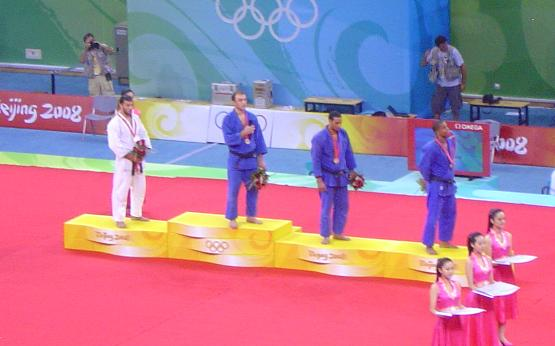
- From left: Benikhlef, Tsirekidze, Mesbah, Aschwanden
- Venue: Beijing Science and Technology University Gymnasium
- Dates: 13 August 2008
- Winning score: 0001

Medalists
1st place, gold medalist(s)		Irakli Tsirekidze	Georgia
2nd place, silver medalist(s)		Amar Benikhlef	Algeria
3rd place, bronze medalist(s)		Hesham Mesbah	Egypt
3rd place, bronze medalist(s)		Sergei Aschwanden	Switzerland

The Men's 90 kg Judo competition at the 2008 Summer Olympics was held on August 13 at the Beijing Science and Technology University Gymnasium. Preliminary rounds started at 12:00 Noon CST. Repechage finals, semifinals, bouts for bronze medals and the final were held at 18:00pm CST.

== Rules ==
This event was the third-heaviest of the men's judo weight classes, limiting competitors to a maximum of 90 kilograms of body mass. Like all other judo events, bouts lasted five minutes. If the bout was still tied at the end, it was extended for another five-minute, sudden-death period; if neither judoka scored during that period, the match is decided by the judges. The tournament bracket consisted of a single-elimination contest culminating in a gold medal match. There was also a repechage to determine the winners of the two bronze medals. Each judoka who had lost to a semifinalist competed in the repechage. The two judokas who lost in the semifinals faced the winner of the opposite half of the bracket's repechage in bronze medal bouts.

== Qualifying athletes ==
Mat	Athlete	Country
1	Choi Sun-ho	South Korea
1	Hesham Mesbah	Egypt
1	Irakli Tsirekidze	Georgia
1	Elkhan Mammadov	Azerbaijan
1	Nematullo Asranqulov	Tajikistan
1	Winston Gordon	Great Britain
1	Khurshid Nabiev	Uzbekistan
1	Daniel Kelly	Australia
1	Hiroshi Izumi	Japan
1	Andrei Kazusionak	Belarus
1	Hossein Ghomi	Iran
1	Ivan Pershin	Russia
1	Patrick Trezise	South Africa
1	Diego Rosati	Argentina
1	Brian Olson	United States
2	Eduardo Santos	Brazil
2	He Yanzhu	China
2	José Camacho	Venezuela
2	Valentyn Grekov	Ukraine
2	Roberto Meloni	Italy
2	Jevgenijs Borodavko	Latvia
2	Yves-Matthieu Dafreville	France
2	Asley González	Cuba
2	Mohamed El Assri	Morocco
2	Amar Benikhlef	Algeria
2	Alexis Chiclana	Puerto Rico
2	Mark Huizinga	Netherlands
2	Michael Pinske	Germany
2	Ilias Iliadis	Greece
2	David Alarza	Spain
2	Sergei Aschwanden	Switzerland

== Tournament results ==
=== Final ===
The gold and silver medalists were determined by the final match of the main single-elimination bracket.

Final
1	Irakli Tsirekidze (GEO)	0001
2	Amar Benikhlef (ALG)	0000

=== Mat 1 ===
1st round
Choi Sun-Ho (KOR)	0000
Hesham Mesbah (EGY)	0000
Elkhan Mammadov (AZE)	0011
Nematullo Asranqulov (TJK)	0000
Winston Gordon (GBR)	0020
Khurshid Nabiev (UZB)	0100
Daniel Kelly (AUS)	0000
Hiroshi Izumi (JPN)	0010
Andrei Kazusionak (BLR)	1110
Hossein Ghomi (IRI)	0000
Ivan Pershin (RUS)	1000
Patrick Trezise (RSA)	0000
Diego Rosati (ARG)	0001
Brian Olson (USA)	0000

Round of 16
Hesham Mesbah (EGY)	0001
Irakli Tsirekidze (GEO)	0010
Elkhan Mammadov (AZE)	0110
Khurshid Nabiev (UZB)	0010
Hiroshi Izumi (JPN)	0000
Andrei Kazusionak (BLR)	1000
Ivan Pershin (RUS)	1000
Diego Rosati (ARG)	0000

Quarter Finals
Irakli Tsirekidze (GEO)	1000
Elkhan Mammadov (AZE)	0000
Andrei Kazusionak (BLR)	0000
Ivan Pershin (RUS)	1010

Semi Finals
Irakli Tsirekidze (GEO)	1002
Ivan Pershin (RUS)	0000

=== Mat 2 ===
1st round
Eduardo Santos (BRA)	1000
He Yanzhu (CHN)	0000
José Camacho (VEN)	1000
Valentyn Grekov (UKR)	0000
Roberto Meloni (ITA)	0100
Jevgenijs Borodavko (LAT)	0010
Yves-Matthieu Dafreville (FRA)	1000
Asley González (CUB)	0000
Mohamed El Assri (MAR)	0001
Amar Benikhlef (ALG)	0011
Alexis Chiclana (PUR)	0100
David Alarza (ESP)	1101
Ilias Iliadis (GRE)	0001
Mark Huizinga (NED)	1010
Michael Pinske (GER)	0000
Sergei Aschwanden (SUI)	0010

Round of 16
Eduardo Santos (BRA)	1000
José Camacho (VEN)	0000
Roberto Meloni (ITA)	0000
Yves-Matthieu Dafreville (FRA)	0010
Amar Benikhlef (ALG)	1020
David Alarza (ESP)	0001
Mark Huizinga (NED)	0010
Sergei Aschwanden (SUI)	1101

Quarter Finals
Eduardo Santos (BRA)	0001
Yves-Matthieu Dafreville (FRA)	1011
Amar Benikhlef (ALG)	0001
Sergei Aschwanden (SUI)	0000

Semi Finals
Yves-Matthieu Dafreville (FRA)	0000
Amar Benikhlef (ALG)	1000

=== Repechage ===
Those judoka eliminated in earlier rounds by the four semifinalists of the main bracket advanced to the repechage. These matches determined the two bronze medalists for the event.

First round
Hesham Mesbah (EGY)
bye
Patrick Trezise (RSA)	0000
Diego Rosati (ARG)	1000
Asley Gonzalez (CUB)	0001
Roberto Meloni (ITA)	1001
Mohamed El Assri (MAR)	0000
David Alarza (ESP)	0000

Second round
Hesham Mesbah (EGY)	0011
Elkhan Mammadov (AZE)	0010
Andrei Kazusionak (BLR)	1000
Diego Rosati (ARG)	0000
Eduardo Santos (BRA)	1000
Roberto Meloni (ITA)	0000
Sergei Aschwanden (SUI)	0001
Mohamed El Assri (MAR)	0000

Third round
Hesham Mesbah (EGY)	1001
Andrei Kazusionak (BLR)	0001
Eduardo Santos (BRA)	0000
Sergei Aschwanden (SUI)	0000

Bronze medal finals
Yves-Matthieu Dafreville (FRA)	0000
Hesham Mesbah (EGY)	1000
Ivan Pershin (RUS)	0020
Sergei Aschwanden (SUI)	1000
