= Masaaki Fukuoka =

Japanese judoka (born 1984)

Personal information
- Born: 12 July 1984 (age 41)
- Occupation: Judoka

Sport
- Country: Japan
- Sport: Judo
- Weight class: –60 kg, –66 kg

Achievements and titles
- World Champ.: (bronze) (2013)
- Asian Champ.: (silver) (2013)
Medal record
Men's judo
Representing Japan
World Championships
Bronze medal – third place	2013 Rio de Janeiro	‍–‍66 kg
Asian Championships
Silver medal – second place	2013 Bangkok	‍–‍66 kg
IJF Grand Slam
Gold medal – first place	2009 Tokyo	‍–‍60 kg
Gold medal – first place	2010 Tokyo	‍–‍66 kg
Silver medal – second place	2009 Moscow	‍–‍60 kg
Bronze medal – third place	2008 Tokyo	‍–‍60 kg
Bronze medal – third place	2010 Paris	‍–‍60 kg
Bronze medal – third place	2011 Paris	‍–‍66 kg
Bronze medal – third place	2014 Paris	‍–‍66 kg
Bronze medal – third place	2014 Tyumen	‍–‍66 kg
IJF Grand Prix
Gold medal – first place	2011 Düsseldorf	‍–‍66 kg
Gold medal – first place	2011 Abu Dhabi	‍–‍66 kg
Silver medal – second place	2010 Tunis	‍–‍60 kg
Silver medal – second place	2013 Düsseldorf	‍–‍66 kg
Summer Universiade
Bronze medal – third place	2009 Belgrade	‍–‍60 kg

Profile at external databases
- IJF: 2006
- JudoInside.com: 35500
- Updated on 5 July 2023

Masaaki Fukuoka (福岡政章, Fukuoka Masaaki; born 12 July 1984) is a male Japanese judoka.
