= Alister Leat =

New Zealand judoka

Alister Seng Kym Leat (14 April 1985 – 3 February 2014) was a New Zealand judoka. Leat represented New Zealand at the 2013 World Judo Championships in Brazil, and was ranked in the top 30 judokas in the world.

His younger brother Adrian dedicated to his brother his silver in the Men's 73 kg event at the 2014 Commonwealth Games.

== Death ==
Leat committed suicide while at a judo tournament in Bulgaria in February 2014. He was 28.
