= 2011 Judo Grand Prix Abu Dhabi =

Judo competition

Judo 2011 Judo Grand Prix Abu Dhabi
- Location: Abu Dhabi, United Arab Emirates
- Dates: 16–18 October 2011
- Competitors: 370 from 61 nations

Competition at external databases
- Links: IJF • JudoInside

The 2011 Judo Grand Prix Abu Dhabi was held in Abu Dhabi, United Arab Emirates from 16 to 18 October 2011.

== Medal summary ==
=== Men's events ===
Event	Gold	Silver	Bronze
Extra-lightweight (−60 kg)	Yerkebulan Kossayev (KAZ)	Ganbatyn Boldbaatar (MGL)	Tobias Englmaier (GER)
Extra-lightweight (−60 kg)	Yerkebulan Kossayev (KAZ)	Ganbatyn Boldbaatar (MGL)	Amiran Papinashvili (GEO)
Half-lightweight (−66 kg)	Masaaki Fukuoka (JPN)	Cho Jun-ho (KOR)	Sergey Lim (KAZ)
Half-lightweight (−66 kg)	Masaaki Fukuoka (JPN)	Cho Jun-ho (KOR)	Sanjaasürengiin Miyaaragchaa (MGL)
Lightweight (−73 kg)	Wang Ki-chun (KOR)	Yasuhiro Awano (JPN)	Rinat Ibragimov (KAZ)
Lightweight (−73 kg)	Wang Ki-chun (KOR)	Yasuhiro Awano (JPN)	Kiyoshi Uematsu (ESP)
Half-middleweight (−81 kg)	Takahiro Nakai (JPN)	Guillaume Elmont (NED)	Travis Stevens (USA)
Half-middleweight (−81 kg)	Takahiro Nakai (JPN)	Guillaume Elmont (NED)	Ivan Vorobev (RUS)
Middleweight (−90 kg)	Varlam Liparteliani (GEO)	Marcus Nyman (SWE)	Elnur Mammadli (AZE)
Middleweight (−90 kg)	Varlam Liparteliani (GEO)	Marcus Nyman (SWE)	Song Dae-nam (KOR)
Half-heavyweight (−100 kg)	Henk Grol (NED)	Ramadan Darwish (EGY)	Benjamin Behrla (GER)
Half-heavyweight (−100 kg)	Henk Grol (NED)	Ramadan Darwish (EGY)	Naidangiin Tüvshinbayar (MGL)
Heavyweight (+100 kg)	Kim Sung-min (KOR)	Luuk Verbij (NED)	Islam El Shehaby (EGY)
Heavyweight (+100 kg)	Kim Sung-min (KOR)	Luuk Verbij (NED)	Zviadi Khanjaliashvili (GEO)

=== Women's events ===
Event	Gold	Silver	Bronze
Extra-lightweight (−48 kg)	Emi Yamagishi (JPN)	Wu Shugen (CHN)	Chung Jung-yeon (KOR)
Extra-lightweight (−48 kg)	Emi Yamagishi (JPN)	Wu Shugen (CHN)	Frédérique Jossinet (FRA)
Half-lightweight (−52 kg)	Majlinda Kelmendi (KOS)	He Hongmei (CHN)	Mönkhbaataryn Bundmaa (MGL)
Half-lightweight (−52 kg)	Majlinda Kelmendi (KOS)	He Hongmei (CHN)	Jaana Sundberg (FIN)
Lightweight (−57 kg)	Giulia Quintavalle (ITA)	Juul Franssen (NED)	Telma Monteiro (POR)
Lightweight (−57 kg)	Giulia Quintavalle (ITA)	Juul Franssen (NED)	Automne Pavia (FRA)
Half-middleweight (−63 kg)	Clarisse Agbegnenou (FRA)	Ramila Yusubova (AZE)	Claudia Malzahn (GER)
Half-middleweight (−63 kg)	Clarisse Agbegnenou (FRA)	Ramila Yusubova (AZE)	Marijana Mišković Hasanbegović (CRO)
Middleweight (−70 kg)	Haruka Tachimoto (JPN)	Marie Pasquet (FRA)	Linda Bolder (NED)
Middleweight (−70 kg)	Haruka Tachimoto (JPN)	Marie Pasquet (FRA)	Chen Fei (CHN)
Half-heavyweight (−78 kg)	Abigél Joó (HUN)	Marhinde Verkerk (NED)	Jeong Gyeong-mi (KOR)
Half-heavyweight (−78 kg)	Abigél Joó (HUN)	Marhinde Verkerk (NED)	Ruika Sato (JPN)
Heavyweight (+78 kg)	Elena Ivashchenko (RUS)	Kayra Sayit (FRA)	Iryna Kindzerska (UKR)
Heavyweight (+78 kg)	Elena Ivashchenko (RUS)	Kayra Sayit (FRA)	Anne-Sophie Mondière (FRA)

Source Results

=== Medal table ===
* Host nation (United Arab Emirates)

Rank	Nation	Gold	Silver	Bronze	Total
1	Japan (JPN)	4	1	1	6
2	South Korea (KOR)	2	1	3	6
3	Netherlands (NED)	1	4	1	6
4	France (FRA)	1	2	3	6
5	Georgia (GEO)	1	0	2	3
5	Kazakhstan (KAZ)	1	0	2	3
7	Russia (RUS)	1	0	1	2
8	Hungary (HUN)	1	0	0	1
8	Italy (ITA)	1	0	0	1
8	Kosovo (KOS)	1	0	0	1
11	China (CHN)	0	2	1	3
12	Mongolia (MGL)	0	1	3	4
13	Azerbaijan (AZE)	0	1	1	2
13	Egypt (EGY)	0	1	1	2
15	Sweden (SWE)	0	1	0	1
16	Germany (GER)	0	0	3	3
17	Croatia (CRO)	0	0	1	1
17	Finland (FIN)	0	0	1	1
17	Portugal (POR)	0	0	1	1
17	Spain (ESP)	0	0	1	1
17	Ukraine (UKR)	0	0	1	1
17	United States (USA)	0	0	1	1
Totals (22 entries)		14	14	28	56
