= Charles Chibana =

Brazilian judoka (born 1989)

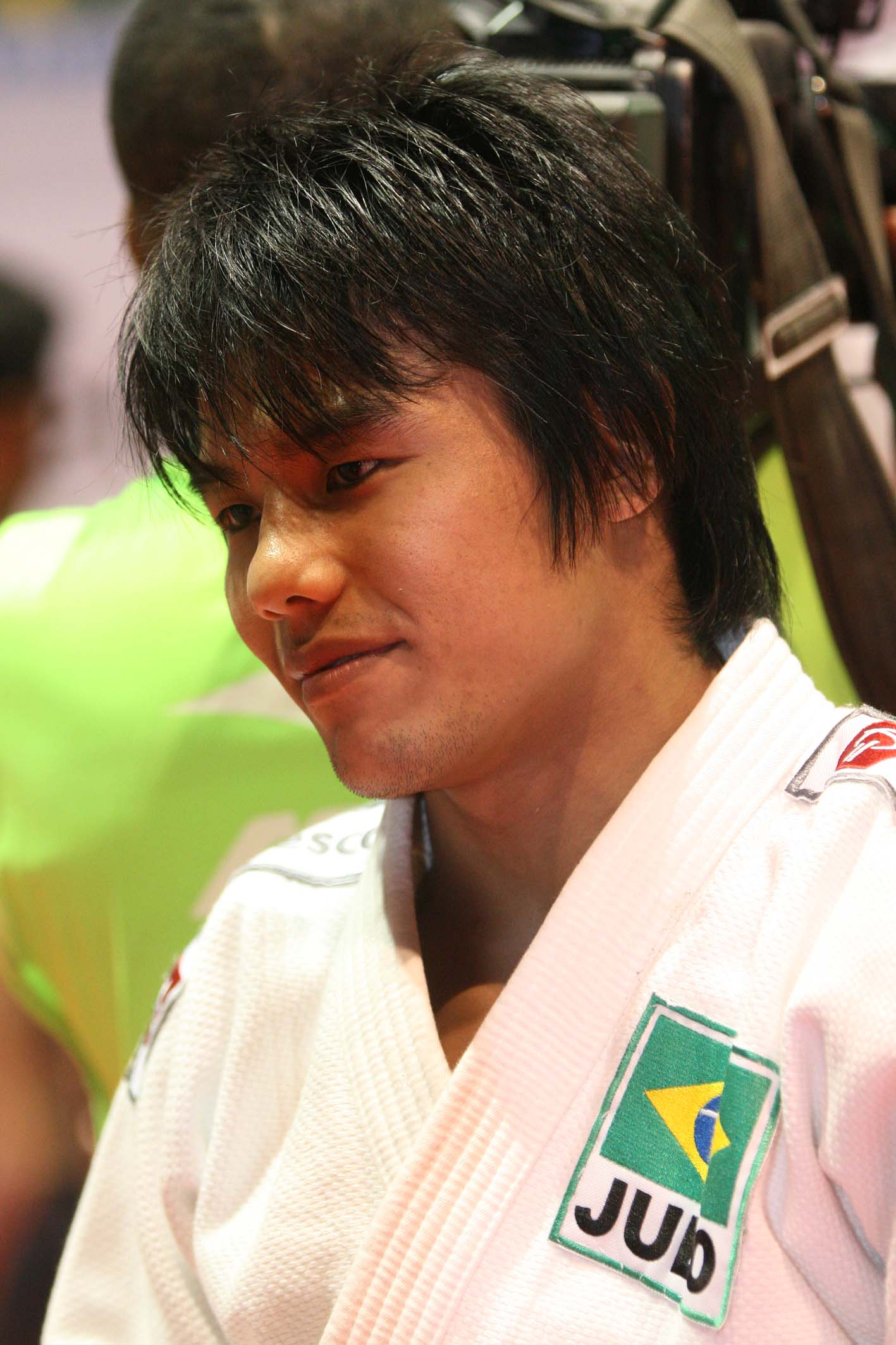
- Chibana in 2011

Personal information
- Nationality: Brazilian
- Born: September 11, 1989 (age 36) São Paulo, Brazil
- Occupation: Judoka
- Height: 5 ft 4 in (163 cm)
- Website: www.charleschibana.com.br

Sport
- Country: Brazil
- Sport: Judo
- Weight class: ‍–‍66 kg
- Club: Esporte Clube Pinheiros
- Coached by: Renato Dagnino
- Now coaching: Israeli national women's judo team

Achievements and titles
- Olympic Games: R32 (2016)
- World Champ.: 5th (2013)
- Pan American Champ.: (2014, 2016)
Medal record
Men's judo
Representing Brazil
World Championships
Silver medal – second place	2007 Beijing	Men's team
Bronze medal – third place	2008 Tokyo	Men's team
Pan American Games
Gold medal – first place	2015 Toronto	‍–‍66 kg
Pan American Championships
Gold medal – first place	2014 Guayaquil	‍–‍66 kg
Gold medal – first place	2016 Havana	‍–‍66 kg
Bronze medal – third place	2013 San José	‍–‍66 kg
IJF Grand Slam
Gold medal – first place	2013 Moscow	‍–‍66 kg
Gold medal – first place	2014 Tyumen	‍–‍66 kg
Silver medal – second place	2013 Tokyo	‍–‍66 kg
Silver medal – second place	2017 Ekaterinburg	‍–‍66 kg
Bronze medal – third place	2016 Abu Dhabi	‍–‍66 kg
IJF Grand Prix
Bronze medal – third place	2014 Samsun	‍–‍66 kg
Bronze medal – third place	2017 Tbilisi	‍–‍66 kg
Bronze medal – third place	2018 Cancún	‍–‍66 kg
Military World Games
Gold medal – first place	2015 Mungyeong	Team

Profile at external databases
- IJF: 4072
- JudoInside.com: 49865
- Updated on 14 May 2022

Charles Koshiro Chibana (born September 11, 1989) is a judoka from Brazil of Japanese origin. He won a gold medal at the 2015 Pan American Games. In addition, he won a gold medal at the 2014 and 2016 Pan American Championships and a bronze medal at the 2013 edition.

== Judo career ==
Chibana was born in São Paulo, Brazil, and is a member of Esporte Clube Pinheiros in São Paulo.

In 2007, Chibana was part of the Brazilian team who came in second at the World Judo Team Championships in Beijing. In 2008, he once again won a medal at the World Judo Team Championships, this time finishing third in Tokyo.

Chibana came in fifth place in the 2013 World Championships in Rio de Janeiro.

In 2015, Chibana won the gold medal in the 2015 Pan American Games in Toronto. He was eliminated in the first bout at the 2016 Summer Olympics.

== Coaching career ==
On 14 May 2022 it was announced that Chibana will join the coaching staff of the Israeli national women's judo team.
