= Sanjaasürengiin Miyaaragchaa =

Mongolian judoka (30 August 1983)

Personal information
- Born: 30 August 1983 (age 42)
- Occupation: Judoka

Sport
- Country: Mongolia
- Sport: Judo
- Weight class: ‍–‍66 kg

Achievements and titles
- World Champ.: R16 (2013)
- Asian Champ.: (bronze) (2009, 2012)
Medal record
Men's judo
Representing Mongolia
Asian Championships
Bronze medal – third place	2009 Taipei	‍–‍66 kg
Bronze medal – third place	2012 Tashkent	‍–‍66 kg
World Masters
Gold medal – first place	2010 Suwon	‍–‍66 kg
Gold medal – first place	2012 Almaty	‍–‍66 kg
IJF Grand Slam
Silver medal – second place	2010 Paris	‍–‍66 kg
Bronze medal – third place	2010 Rio de Janeiro	‍–‍66 kg
Bronze medal – third place	2012 Moscow	‍–‍66 kg
IJF Grand Prix
Gold medal – first place	2009 Qingdao	‍–‍66 kg
Gold medal – first place	2013 Ulaanbaatar	‍–‍66 kg
Silver medal – second place	2011 Amsterdam	‍–‍66 kg
Bronze medal – third place	2011 Abu Dhabi	‍–‍66 kg

Profile at external databases
- IJF: 2013
- JudoInside.com: 43487
- Updated on 29 July 2025

Sanjaasürengiin Miyaaragchaa or Sanjaasürengiin Myaaragchaa (Mongolian: Санжаасүрэнгийн Мяарагчаа; 30 August 1983) was a Mongolian wrestler who represented his country in sambo and judo in the half-lightweight division (66 kg). At the 2012 Judo World Masters in Almaty, Kazakhstan, he won a gold medal. In the semifinals, he came up against the 2010 World champion Junpei Morishita of Japan. In the match Miyaaragchaa originally scored yuko by a traditional throw with leg grabbed by the hand, the kata guruma, and then he won by earning a good ippon using ashi-waza. After that victory, he advances to the final. At the final, it comes to him against a compatriot and teammate, the 2004 Olympic medalist and the 2009 World champion Khashbaataryn Tsagaanbaatar who defeated the reigning World and Japan national champion Masashi Ebinuma. Miyaaragchaa scored an ippon to grab a victory.
