= Choi Sun-ho =

Olympic judoka

Personal information
- Nationality: South Korea
- Born: 24 June 1977 (age 49)
- Occupation: Judoka
- Height: 1.78 m (5 ft 10 in)
- Weight: 90 kg (198 lb)

Korean name
- Hangul: 최선호
- RR: Choe Seonho
- MR: Ch'oe Sŏnho

Sport
- Sport: Judo
- Event: 90 kg
- College team: Yong-In University
- Team: Suwon City Government
Medal record
Men's judo
Representing South Korea
Asian Championships
Gold medal – first place	2007 Kuwait City	90 kg
Silver medal – second place	2003 Jeju City	90 kg
Bronze medal – third place	2008 Jeju City	90 kg

Profile at external databases
- JudoInside.com: 3655

Choi Sun-ho (Korean: 최선호; born June 24, 1977) is a South Korean judoka, who played for the middleweight category. He won a total of three medals (gold, silver, and bronze) in his division at the Asian Judo Championships (2003 and 2008 in Jeju City, and 2007 in Kuwait City, Kuwait).

Choi represented South Korea at the 2008 Summer Olympics in Beijing, where he competed in the men's middleweight class (90 kg). He lost the first preliminary round match to Egypt's Hesham Mesbah by a koka and a superiority decision.
