= 2009 Judo Grand Prix Hamburg =

Judo competition

Judo 2009 Judo Grand Prix Hamburg
- Location: Hamburg, Germany
- Dates: 21–22 February 2009
- Competitors: 382 from 44 nations

Competition at external databases
- Links: IJF • JudoInside

The 2009 Judo Grand Prix Hamburg was held in Hamburg, Germany from 21 to 22 February 2009.

== Medal summary ==
=== Men's events ===
| Event | Gold | Silver | Bronze |
|---|---|---|---|
| Extra-lightweight (−60 kg) | Rishod Sobirov (UZB) | Yosmani Piker (CUB) | Hiroaki Hiraoka (JPN) |
| Extra-lightweight (−60 kg) | Rishod Sobirov (UZB) | Yosmani Piker (CUB) | Jeroen Mooren (NED) |
| Half-lightweight (−66 kg) | Kim Joo-jin (KOR) | Kim Hyung-ju (KOR) | Ramil Gasimov (AZE) |
| Half-lightweight (−66 kg) | Kim Joo-jin (KOR) | Kim Hyung-ju (KOR) | Miklós Ungvári (HUN) |
| Lightweight (−73 kg) | Mansur Isaev (RUS) | Azamat Sidakov (RUS) | Ali Maloumat (IRI) |
| Lightweight (−73 kg) | Mansur Isaev (RUS) | Azamat Sidakov (RUS) | Dirk Van Tichelt (BEL) |
| Half-middleweight (−81 kg) | Sirazhudin Magomedov (RUS) | João Neto (POR) | Jorge Benavente (ESP) |
| Half-middleweight (−81 kg) | Sirazhudin Magomedov (RUS) | João Neto (POR) | Ivan Nifontov (RUS) |
| Middleweight (−90 kg) | Yves-Matthieu Dafreville (FRA) | Yuya Yoshida (JPN) | Elkhan Mammadov (AZE) |
| Middleweight (−90 kg) | Yves-Matthieu Dafreville (FRA) | Yuya Yoshida (JPN) | Vadym Synyavsky (UKR) |
| Half-heavyweight (−100 kg) | Takamasa Anai (JPN) | Henk Grol (NED) | Irakli Tsirekidze (GEO) |
| Half-heavyweight (−100 kg) | Takamasa Anai (JPN) | Henk Grol (NED) | Daniel Brata (ROU) |
| Heavyweight (+100 kg) | Abdullo Tangriev (UZB) | Óscar Brayson (CUB) | Anis Chedly (TUN) |
| Heavyweight (+100 kg) | Abdullo Tangriev (UZB) | Óscar Brayson (CUB) | Yasuyuki Muneta (JPN) |

=== Women's events ===
| Event | Gold | Silver | Bronze |
|---|---|---|---|
| Extra-lightweight (−48 kg) | Tomoko Fukumi (JPN) | Alina Dumitru (ROU) | Frédérique Jossinet (FRA) |
| Extra-lightweight (−48 kg) | Tomoko Fukumi (JPN) | Alina Dumitru (ROU) | Emi Yamagishi (JPN) |
| Half-lightweight (−52 kg) | Misato Nakamura (JPN) | He Hongmei (CHN) | Andreea Catuna Ionas (ROU) |
| Half-lightweight (−52 kg) | Misato Nakamura (JPN) | He Hongmei (CHN) | Petra Nareks (SLO) |
| Lightweight (−57 kg) | Telma Monteiro (POR) | Zhu Guirong (CHN) | Corina Căprioriu (ROU) |
| Lightweight (−57 kg) | Telma Monteiro (POR) | Zhu Guirong (CHN) | Kaori Matsumoto (JPN) |
| Half-middleweight (−63 kg) | Yoshie Ueno (JPN) | Elisabeth Willeboordse (NED) | Yaritza Abel (CUB) |
| Half-middleweight (−63 kg) | Yoshie Ueno (JPN) | Elisabeth Willeboordse (NED) | Rina Kozawa (JPN) |
| Middleweight (−70 kg) | Mina Watanabe (JPN) | Asuka Oka (JPN) | Raša Sraka (SLO) |
| Middleweight (−70 kg) | Mina Watanabe (JPN) | Asuka Oka (JPN) | Catherine Jacques (BEL) |
| Half-heavyweight (−78 kg) | Céline Lebrun (FRA) | Sae Nakazawa (JPN) | Sayaka Anai (JPN) |
| Half-heavyweight (−78 kg) | Céline Lebrun (FRA) | Sae Nakazawa (JPN) | Stéphanie Possamaï (FRA) |
| Heavyweight (+78 kg) | Liu Huanyuan (CHN) | Mika Sugimoto (JPN) | Éva Bisséni (FRA) |
| Heavyweight (+78 kg) | Liu Huanyuan (CHN) | Mika Sugimoto (JPN) | Gulzhan Issanova (KAZ) |

Source Results

=== Medal table ===
* Host nation (Germany)

| Rank | Nation | Gold | Silver | Bronze | Total |
|---|---|---|---|---|---|
| 1 | Japan (JPN) | 5 | 4 | 6 | 15 |
| 2 | Russia (RUS) | 2 | 1 | 1 | 4 |
| 3 | France (FRA) | 2 | 0 | 3 | 5 |
| 4 | Uzbekistan (UZB) | 2 | 0 | 0 | 2 |
| 5 | China (CHN) | 1 | 2 | 0 | 3 |
| 6 | Portugal (POR) | 1 | 1 | 0 | 2 |
| 6 | South Korea (KOR) | 1 | 1 | 0 | 2 |
| 8 | Cuba (CUB) | 0 | 2 | 1 | 3 |
| 8 | Netherlands (NED) | 0 | 2 | 1 | 3 |
| 10 | Romania (ROU) | 0 | 1 | 3 | 4 |
| 11 | Azerbaijan (AZE) | 0 | 0 | 2 | 2 |
| 11 | Belgium (BEL) | 0 | 0 | 2 | 2 |
| 11 | Slovenia (SLO) | 0 | 0 | 2 | 2 |
| 14 | Georgia (GEO) | 0 | 0 | 1 | 1 |
| 14 | Hungary (HUN) | 0 | 0 | 1 | 1 |
| 14 | Iran (IRI) | 0 | 0 | 1 | 1 |
| 14 | Kazakhstan (KAZ) | 0 | 0 | 1 | 1 |
| 14 | Spain (ESP) | 0 | 0 | 1 | 1 |
| 14 | Tunisia (TUN) | 0 | 0 | 1 | 1 |
| 14 | Ukraine (UKR) | 0 | 0 | 1 | 1 |
| Totals (20 entries) | | 14 | 14 | 28 | 56 |
