= Michael Pinske =

German judoka (born 1985)

Personal information
- Born: 22 August 1985 (age 40)
- Occupation: Judoka

Sport
- Country: Germany
- Sport: Judo
- Weight class: ‍–‍90 kg

Achievements and titles
- Olympic Games: R32 (2008)
- World Champ.: R16 (2007)
- European Champ.: 5th (2005, 2007, 2009)
Medal record
Men's judo
Representing Germany
IJF Grand Slam
Bronze medal – third place	2009 Paris	‍–‍90 kg
IJF Grand Prix
Bronze medal – third place	2009 Tunis	‍–‍90 kg
European U23 Championships
Silver medal – second place	2005 Kyiv	‍–‍90 kg

Profile at external databases
- IJF: 609
- JudoInside.com: 15617
- Updated on 28 November 2022

Michael Pinske (born 22 August 1985) is a German judoka. His mother, Andrea Pollack, won three Olympic gold medals in swimming.

== Achievements ==
Year	Tournament	Place	Weight class
2009	European Judo Championships	5th	Middleweight (90 kg)
2007	European Judo Championships	5th	Middleweight (90 kg)
2005	European Judo Championships	5th	Middleweight (90 kg)
