= 2010 Judo Grand Slam Paris =

Judo competition

Judo 2010 Judo Grand Slam Paris
- Venue: Accor Arena
- Location: Paris, France
- Dates: 6–7 February 2010
- Competitors: 382 from 53 nations

Competition at external databases
- Links: IJF • EJU • JudoInside

The 2010 Judo Grand Slam Paris was held in Paris, France, from February 6th to February 7th 2010.

== Medal summary ==
=== Men's events ===
Event	Gold	Silver	Bronze
Extra-lightweight (−60 kg)	David Asumbani (GEO)	Rishod Sobirov (UZB)	Dimitri Dragin (FRA)
Extra-lightweight (−60 kg)	David Asumbani (GEO)	Rishod Sobirov (UZB)	Masaaki Fukuoka (JPN)
Half-lightweight (−66 kg)	Kim Joo-jin (KOR)	Sanjaasürengiin Miyaaragchaa (MGL)	Khashbaataryn Tsagaanbaatar (MGL)
Half-lightweight (−66 kg)	Kim Joo-jin (KOR)	Sanjaasürengiin Miyaaragchaa (MGL)	David Larose (FRA)
Lightweight (−73 kg)	Wang Ki-chun (KOR)	Hiroyuki Akimoto (JPN)	Yasuhiro Awano (JPN)
Lightweight (−73 kg)	Wang Ki-chun (KOR)	Hiroyuki Akimoto (JPN)	Rinat Ibragimov (KAZ)
Half-middleweight (−81 kg)	Leandro Guilheiro (BRA)	Levan Tsiklauri (GEO)	Travis Stevens (USA)
Half-middleweight (−81 kg)	Leandro Guilheiro (BRA)	Levan Tsiklauri (GEO)	Antoine Jeannin (FRA)
Middleweight (−90 kg)	Takashi Ono (JPN)	Dilshod Choriev (UZB)	Tiago Camilo (BRA)
Middleweight (−90 kg)	Takashi Ono (JPN)	Dilshod Choriev (UZB)	Amar Benikhlef (ALG)
Half-heavyweight (−100 kg)	Elco van der Geest (BEL)	Sergei Samoilovich (RUS)	Dimitri Peters (GER)
Half-heavyweight (−100 kg)	Elco van der Geest (BEL)	Sergei Samoilovich (RUS)	Irakli Tsirekidze (GEO)
Heavyweight (+100 kg)	Teddy Riner (FRA)	Grim Vuijsters (NED)	Kim Sung-min (KOR)
Heavyweight (+100 kg)	Teddy Riner (FRA)	Grim Vuijsters (NED)	Martin Padar (EST)

=== Women's events ===
Event	Gold	Silver	Bronze
Extra-lightweight (−48 kg)	Emi Yamagishi (JPN)	Frédérique Jossinet (FRA)	Tomoko Fukumi (JPN)
Extra-lightweight (−48 kg)	Emi Yamagishi (JPN)	Frédérique Jossinet (FRA)	Chung Jung-yeon (KOR)
Half-lightweight (−52 kg)	Misato Nakamura (JPN)	Ana Carrascosa (ESP)	Meriem Moussa (ALG)
Half-lightweight (−52 kg)	Misato Nakamura (JPN)	Ana Carrascosa (ESP)	Ilse Heylen (BEL)
Lightweight (−57 kg)	Kaori Matsumoto (JPN)	Morgane Ribout (FRA)	Hedvig Karakas (HUN)
Lightweight (−57 kg)	Kaori Matsumoto (JPN)	Morgane Ribout (FRA)	Nae Udaka (JPN)
Half-middleweight (−63 kg)	Gévrise Émane (FRA)	Anicka van Emden (NED)	Yoshie Ueno (JPN)
Half-middleweight (−63 kg)	Gévrise Émane (FRA)	Anicka van Emden (NED)	Elisabeth Willeboordse (NED)
Middleweight (−70 kg)	Lucie Décosse (FRA)	Anett Mészáros (HUN)	Hwang Ye-sul (KOR)
Middleweight (−70 kg)	Lucie Décosse (FRA)	Anett Mészáros (HUN)	Yoriko Kunihara (JPN)
Half-heavyweight (−78 kg)	Akari Ogata (JPN)	Sayaka Anai (JPN)	Céline Lebrun (FRA)
Half-heavyweight (−78 kg)	Akari Ogata (JPN)	Sayaka Anai (JPN)	Lucie Louette (FRA)
Heavyweight (+78 kg)	Elena Ivashchenko (RUS)	Nihel Cheikh Rouhou (TUN)	Idalys Ortiz (CUB)
Heavyweight (+78 kg)	Elena Ivashchenko (RUS)	Nihel Cheikh Rouhou (TUN)	Kim Na-young (KOR)

Source Results

=== Medal table ===
* Host nation (France)

Rank	Nation	Gold	Silver	Bronze	Total
1	Japan (JPN)	5	2	6	13
2	France (FRA)*	3	2	5	10
3	South Korea (KOR)	2	0	4	6
4	Georgia (GEO)	1	1	1	3
5	Russia (RUS)	1	1	0	2
6	Belgium (BEL)	1	0	1	2
6	Brazil (BRA)	1	0	1	2
8	Netherlands (NED)	0	2	1	3
9	Uzbekistan (UZB)	0	2	0	2
10	Hungary (HUN)	0	1	1	2
10	Mongolia (MGL)	0	1	1	2
12	Spain (ESP)	0	1	0	1
12	Tunisia (TUN)	0	1	0	1
14	Algeria (ALG)	0	0	2	2
15	Cuba (CUB)	0	0	1	1
15	Estonia (EST)	0	0	1	1
15	Germany (GER)	0	0	1	1
15	Kazakhstan (KAZ)	0	0	1	1
15	United States (USA)	0	0	1	1
Totals (19 entries)		14	14	28	56
