= Dimitri Dragin =

French judoka (born 1984)

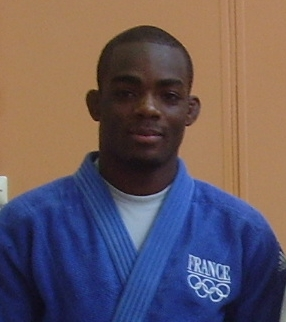

Personal information
- Born: 2 December 1984 (age 41) Le Havre, France
- Occupation: Judoka

Sport
- Country: France
- Sport: Judo
- Weight class: –60 kg, –66 kg

Achievements and titles
- Olympic Games: 5th (2008)
- World Champ.: R16 (2013)
- European Champ.: (bronze) (2013)
Medal record
Men's judo
Representing France
European Championships
Bronze medal – third place	2013 Budapest	–66 kg
IJF Grand Slam
Gold medal – first place	2009 Paris	–60 kg
Bronze medal – third place	2010 Paris	–60 kg
IJF Grand Prix
Bronze medal – third place	2011 Qingdao	–66 kg
Bronze medal – third place	2013 Samsun	–66 kg

Profile at external databases
- IJF: 356
- JudoInside.com: 18865
- Updated on 14 November 2022

Dimitri Dragin (born 2 December 1984 in Le Havre) is a French judoka who competed at the 2008 Summer Olympics in the men's extra lightweight division. He is regarded as having some of the best ashi waza in international judo
