= Judo at the 2014 Asian Games – Men's 66 kg =

Judo competition

Men's 66 kg at the 2014 Asian Games
- Venue: Dowon Gymnasium
- Date: 20 September 2014
- Competitors: 19 from 19 nations

Medalists
gold medal	Davaadorjiin Tömörkhüleg	Mongolia
silver medal	Tomofumi Takajo	Japan
bronze medal	Mirzohid Farmonov	Uzbekistan
bronze medal	Azamat Mukanov	Kazakhstan

The men's 66 kilograms (Half lightweight) competition at the 2014 Asian Games in Incheon was held on 20 September at the Dowon Gymnasium.

== Schedule ==
All times are Korea Standard Time (UTC+09:00)

Date	Time	Event
Saturday, 20 September 2014	14:00	Elimination round of 32
Saturday, 20 September 2014	14:00	Elimination round of 16
Saturday, 20 September 2014	14:00	Quarterfinals
Saturday, 20 September 2014	14:00	Semifinals
Saturday, 20 September 2014	14:00	Final of repechage
Saturday, 20 September 2014	19:00	Finals

== Results ==
Legend

- DQ — Won by disqualification

=== Main bracket ===
==== Final ====
Gold medal contest
Davaadorjiin Tömörkhüleg (MGL)	101
Tomofumi Takajo (JPN)	000

==== Top half ====
Elimination round of 32
Mustafa Khousrof (YEM)	002
Kemal Amanow (TKM)	000
Chui Yiu Leung (HKG)	000
Amornthep Namwiset (THA)	000

Elimination round of 16
Davaadorjiin Tömörkhüleg (MGL)	100
Ramesh Magar (NEP)	000
Rasul Abdusharipov (TJK)	100
Mustafa Khousrof (YEM)	000
Azamat Mukanov (KAZ)	DQ
Zaki Zubairullah (AFG)
Ma Duanbin (CHN)	100
Chui Yiu Leung (HKG)	000

Quarterfinals
Davaadorjiin Tömörkhüleg (MGL)	101
Rasul Abdusharipov (TJK)	000
Azamat Mukanov (KAZ)	013
Ma Duanbin (CHN)	010

Semifinals
Davaadorjiin Tömörkhüleg (MGL)	100
Azamat Mukanov (KAZ)	000

==== Bottom half ====
Elimination round of 32
Wong Kin Wai (MAC)	000
Sulaiman Hamad (KSA)	100

Elimination round of 16
Tomofumi Takajo (JPN)	100
Choi Gwang-hyeon (KOR)	000
Chien Chia-hung (TPE)	100
Soukthalong Sikhod (LAO)	000
Mirzohid Farmonov (UZB)	100
Sulaiman Hamad (KSA)	000
Hyon Song-chol (PRK)	101
Fadi Darwish (SYR)	000

Quarterfinals
Tomofumi Takajo (JPN)	000
Chien Chia-hung (TPE)	000
Mirzohid Farmonov (UZB)	001
Hyon Song-chol (PRK)	000

Semifinals
Tomofumi Takajo (JPN)	100
Mirzohid Farmonov (UZB)	000

=== Repechage ===
Final of repechage
Rasul Abdusharipov (TJK)	100
Ma Duanbin (CHN)	000
Chien Chia-hung (TPE)	101
Hyon Song-chol (PRK)	000

Bronze medal contests
Rasul Abdusharipov (TJK)	000
Mirzohid Farmonov (UZB)	100
Chien Chia-hung (TPE)	000
Azamat Mukanov (KAZ)	000
