= Steven Brown (judoka) =

Australian Olympic judoka

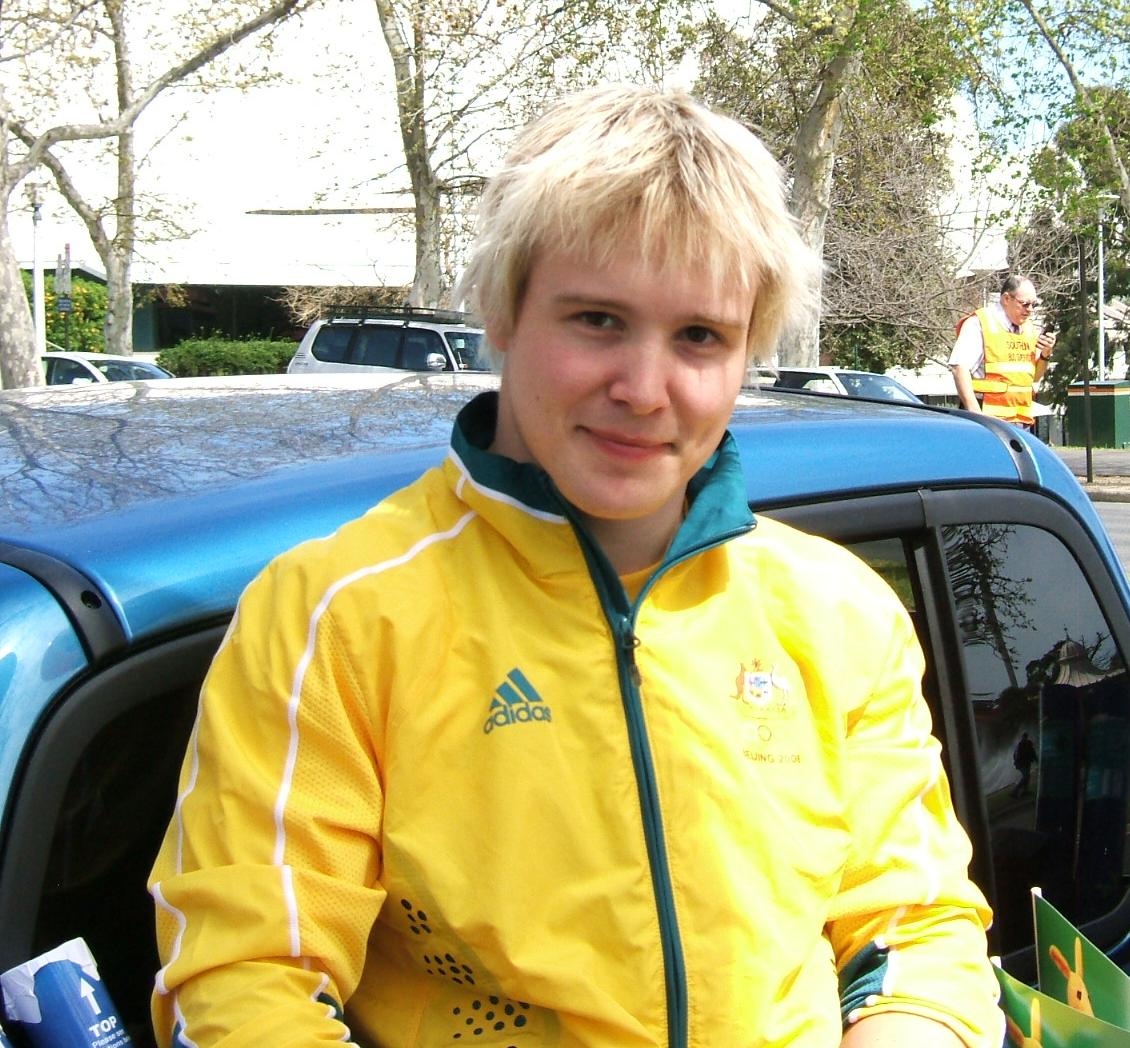

Personal information
- Born: 4 April 1986 (age 40)
- Home town: Adelaide, South Australia, Australia
- Occupation: Judoka

Sport
- Country: Australia
- Sport: Judo
- Weight class: ‍–‍66 kg
- Club: South Australian Judo Academy

Achievements and titles
- Olympic Games: R32 (2008)
- World Champ.: R32 (2011, 2013)
- Oceania Champ.: (silver) (2006, 2008, 2010, 2011, 2012, 2014)
- Commonwealth Games: R16 (2014)
Medal record
Men's judo
Representing Australia
Oceania Championships
Silver medal – second place	2006 Papeete	‍–‍66 kg
Silver medal – second place	2008 Christchurch	‍–‍66 kg
Silver medal – second place	2010 Canberra	‍–‍66 kg
Silver medal – second place	2011 Papeete	‍–‍66 kg
Silver medal – second place	2012 Cairns	‍–‍66 kg
Silver medal – second place	2014 Auckland	‍–‍66 kg
Bronze medal – third place	2013 Apia	‍–‍66 kg

Profile at external databases
- IJF: 2883
- JudoInside.com: 43286
- Updated on 30 October 2024

Steven Brown (born 4 April 1986) is an Australian judoka who represented Australia at the 2008 Summer Olympics in Beijing. South Australia's first ever Judo Olympian was defeated by Algeria's Mounir Benamadi in the men's 66 kg class. Brown is a former 66 kg Australian Champion and multiple international medalist.

Brown represented Australia at the World Judo Championships in Paris 2011 and Rio de Janeiro 2013, he was also selected for Tokyo (2010), and Chelyabinsk (2014) but did not compete.

Brown represented Australia at the 2014 Commonwealth Games in Glasgow, Scotland - the first South Australian to do so. At the end of this event, Brown announced his retirement from competitive Judo.

Brown is now the head coach of the South Australian Judo Academy.

Brown won his first professional MMA fight at Diamondback Fighting Championship in October 2016 winning via RNC.
