= 2009 Judo Grand Slam Paris =

Judo competition

Judo 2009 Judo Grand Slam Paris
- Venue: Accor Arena
- Location: Paris, France
- Dates: 7-8 February 2009
- Competitors: 375 from 48 nations
- Total prize money: $154,000

Competition at external databases
- Links: IJF • EJU • JudoInside

The 2009 Judo Grand Slam Paris was held in Paris, France, from 7 to 8 February 2009.

== Medal summary ==
Results:

=== Men's events ===
Event	Gold	Silver	Bronze
Extra-lightweight (−60 kg)	Dimitri Dragin (FRA)	Amiran Papinashvili (GEO)	Ludwig Paischer (AUT)
Extra-lightweight (−60 kg)	Dimitri Dragin (FRA)	Amiran Papinashvili (GEO)	Choi Gwang-hyeon (KOR)
Half-lightweight (−66 kg)	Masato Uchishiba (JPN)	Benjamin Darbelet (FRA)	An Jeong-hwan (KOR)
Half-lightweight (−66 kg)	Masato Uchishiba (JPN)	Benjamin Darbelet (FRA)	Miklós Ungvári (HUN)
Lightweight (−73 kg)	Wang Ki-chun (KOR)	Yordanis Arencibia (CUB)	Gilles Bonhomme (FRA)
Lightweight (−73 kg)	Wang Ki-chun (KOR)	Yordanis Arencibia (CUB)	Mario Schendel (GER)
Half-middleweight (−81 kg)	Song Dae-nam (KOR)	Kim Jae-bum (KOR)	Axel Clerget (FRA)
Half-middleweight (−81 kg)	Song Dae-nam (KOR)	Kim Jae-bum (KOR)	Ivan Nifontov (RUS)
Middleweight (−90 kg)	Yves-Matthieu Dafreville (FRA)	Takashi Ono (JPN)	Michael Pinske (GER)
Middleweight (−90 kg)	Yves-Matthieu Dafreville (FRA)	Takashi Ono (JPN)	Kirill Denisov (RUS)
Half-heavyweight (−100 kg)	Takamasa Anai (JPN)	Yauhen Biadulin (BLR)	Daniel Brata (ROU)
Half-heavyweight (−100 kg)	Takamasa Anai (JPN)	Yauhen Biadulin (BLR)	Dimitri Peters (GER)
Heavyweight (+100 kg)	Teddy Riner (FRA)	Alexander Mikhaylin (RUS)	Pierre Robin (FRA)
Heavyweight (+100 kg)	Teddy Riner (FRA)	Alexander Mikhaylin (RUS)	Abdullo Tangriev (UZB)

=== Women's events ===
Event	Gold	Silver	Bronze
Extra-lightweight (−48 kg)	Emi Yamagishi (JPN)	Frédérique Jossinet (FRA)	Aurore Urani Climence (FRA)
Extra-lightweight (−48 kg)	Emi Yamagishi (JPN)	Frédérique Jossinet (FRA)	Tomoko Fukumi (JPN)
Half-lightweight (−52 kg)	Natalia Kuziutina (RUS)	Audrey La Rizza (FRA)	Kim Kyung-ok (KOR)
Half-lightweight (−52 kg)	Natalia Kuziutina (RUS)	Audrey La Rizza (FRA)	Misato Nakamura (JPN)
Lightweight (−57 kg)	Ioulietta Boukouvala (GRE)	Morgane Ribout (FRA)	Barbara Harel (FRA)
Lightweight (−57 kg)	Ioulietta Boukouvala (GRE)	Morgane Ribout (FRA)	Kaori Matsumoto (JPN)
Half-middleweight (−63 kg)	Yoshie Ueno (JPN)	Nozomi Hirai (JPN)	Vera Koval (RUS)
Half-middleweight (−63 kg)	Yoshie Ueno (JPN)	Nozomi Hirai (JPN)	Marijana Mišković Hasanbegović (CRO)
Middleweight (−70 kg)	Lucie Décosse (FRA)	Marie Pasquet (FRA)	Dou Shumei (CHN)
Middleweight (−70 kg)	Lucie Décosse (FRA)	Marie Pasquet (FRA)	Kerstin Thiele (GER)
Half-heavyweight (−78 kg)	Céline Lebrun (FRA)	Marhinde Verkerk (NED)	Maryna Pryshchepa (UKR)
Half-heavyweight (−78 kg)	Céline Lebrun (FRA)	Marhinde Verkerk (NED)	Yang Xiuli (CHN)
Heavyweight (+78 kg)	Tong Wen (CHN)	Idalys Ortiz (CUB)	Elena Ivashchenko (RUS)
Heavyweight (+78 kg)	Tong Wen (CHN)	Idalys Ortiz (CUB)	Megumi Tachimoto (JPN)

=== Medal table ===
* Host nation (France)

Rank	Nation	Gold	Silver	Bronze	Total
1	France (FRA)*	5	5	5	15
2	Japan (JPN)	4	2	4	10
3	South Korea (KOR)	2	1	3	6
4	Russia (RUS)	1	1	4	6
5	China (CHN)	1	0	2	3
6	Greece (GRE)	1	0	0	1
7	Cuba (CUB)	0	2	0	2
8	Belarus (BLR)	0	1	0	1
8	Georgia (GEO)	0	1	0	1
8	Netherlands (NED)	0	1	0	1
11	Germany (GER)	0	0	4	4
12	Austria (AUT)	0	0	1	1
12	Croatia (CRO)	0	0	1	1
12	Hungary (HUN)	0	0	1	1
12	Romania (ROU)	0	0	1	1
12	Ukraine (UKR)	0	0	1	1
12	Uzbekistan (UZB)	0	0	1	1
Totals (17 entries)		14	14	28	56

== Prize money ==
The sums written are per medalist, bringing the total prizes awarded to $154,000.

Medal	Prize
Gold	$5,000
Silver	$3,000
Bronze	$1,500
