= Azamat Mukanov =

Kazakh judoka (born 1987)

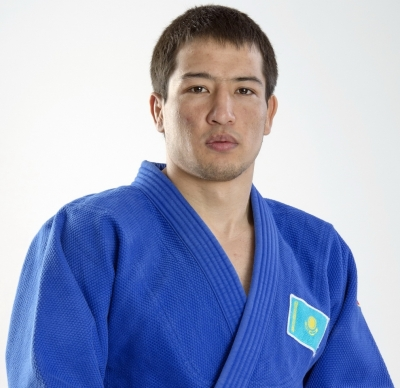

Personal information
- Nationality: Kazakhstani
- Born: 30 January 1987 (age 39)
- Occupation: Judoka

Sport
- Country: Kazakhstan
- Sport: Judo
- Weight class: –66 kg

Achievements and titles
- World Champ.: (silver) (2013)
- Asian Champ.: (bronze) (2013, 2014)
Medal record
Men's judo
Representing Kazakhstan
World Championships
| Silver medal – second place | 2013 Rio de Janeiro | ‍–‍66 kg |
Asian Games
| Silver medal – second place | 2014 Incheon | Men's team |
| Bronze medal – third place | 2014 Incheon | ‍–‍66 kg |
Asian Championships
| Bronze medal – third place | 2013 Bangkok | ‍–‍66 kg |
IJF Grand Slam
| Silver medal – second place | 2016 Baku | ‍–‍66 kg |
| Silver medal – second place | 2016 Abu Dhabi | ‍–‍66 kg |
IJF Grand Prix
| Silver medal – second place | 2016 Tashkent | ‍–‍66 kg |

Profile at external databases
- IJF: 2341
- JudoInside.com: 68579
- Updated on 5 July 2023

Azamat Mukanov (born 30 January 1987) is a Kazakh judoka. He won the silver medal at the 2013 World Judo Championships held in Rio de Janeiro in the ‍–‍66 kg event. Mukanov is the 2011 national champion of Kazakhstand and ranked third in 2013. He claimed the bronze medal in the World Cup event in Prague 2012 and another bronze medal at the 2013 Asian Championships in Bangkok.

== Palmarès ==
2011
(gold) Kazakhstan Championships -66 kg, Uralsk
2012
(bronze) World Cup -66 kg, Prague
(bronze) Kazakhstan Championships -66 kg, Taldykorgan
2013
(silver) World Championships -66 kg, Rio de Janeiro
(bronze) Asian Championships -66 kg, Bangkok
