= Patrick Trezise =

South African Olympic judoka

Personal information
- Nationality: South Africa
- Born: 25 March 1982 (age 44) Durban, South Africa
- Height: 1.82 m (5 ft 11 1/2 in)
- Weight: 90 kg (198 lb)

Sport
- Sport: Judo
- Event: 90 kg
- Club: TuksSport
Medal record
Men's judo
Representing South Africa
African Championships
Silver medal – second place	2011 Dakar	90 kg
Bronze medal – third place	2008 Agadir	90 kg
Bronze medal – third place	2009 Port Louis	90 kg
Bronze medal – third place	2010 Yaounde	90 kg

Patrick Trezise (born 25 March 1982, in Durban) is a South African judoka, who played for the middleweight category. He is also a four-time medalist for his division at the African Judo Championships.

Trezise represented South Africa at the 2008 Summer Olympics, where he competed for the men's middleweight class (90 kg). He lost his first preliminary match by an ippon and a kata guruma (shoulder wheel) to Russia's Ivan Pershin. Because his opponent advanced further into the semi-finals, Trezise offered another shot for the bronze medal by entering the repechage rounds. He was defeated in his first match by Argentina's Diego Rosati, who successfully scored an ippon and a seoi-nage (shoulder throw), at fifty-three seconds. Patrick is now the coach of Ippon Judo club in Pretoria which he started.
