= Eduardo Santos (judoka) =

Brazilian judoka (born 1983)

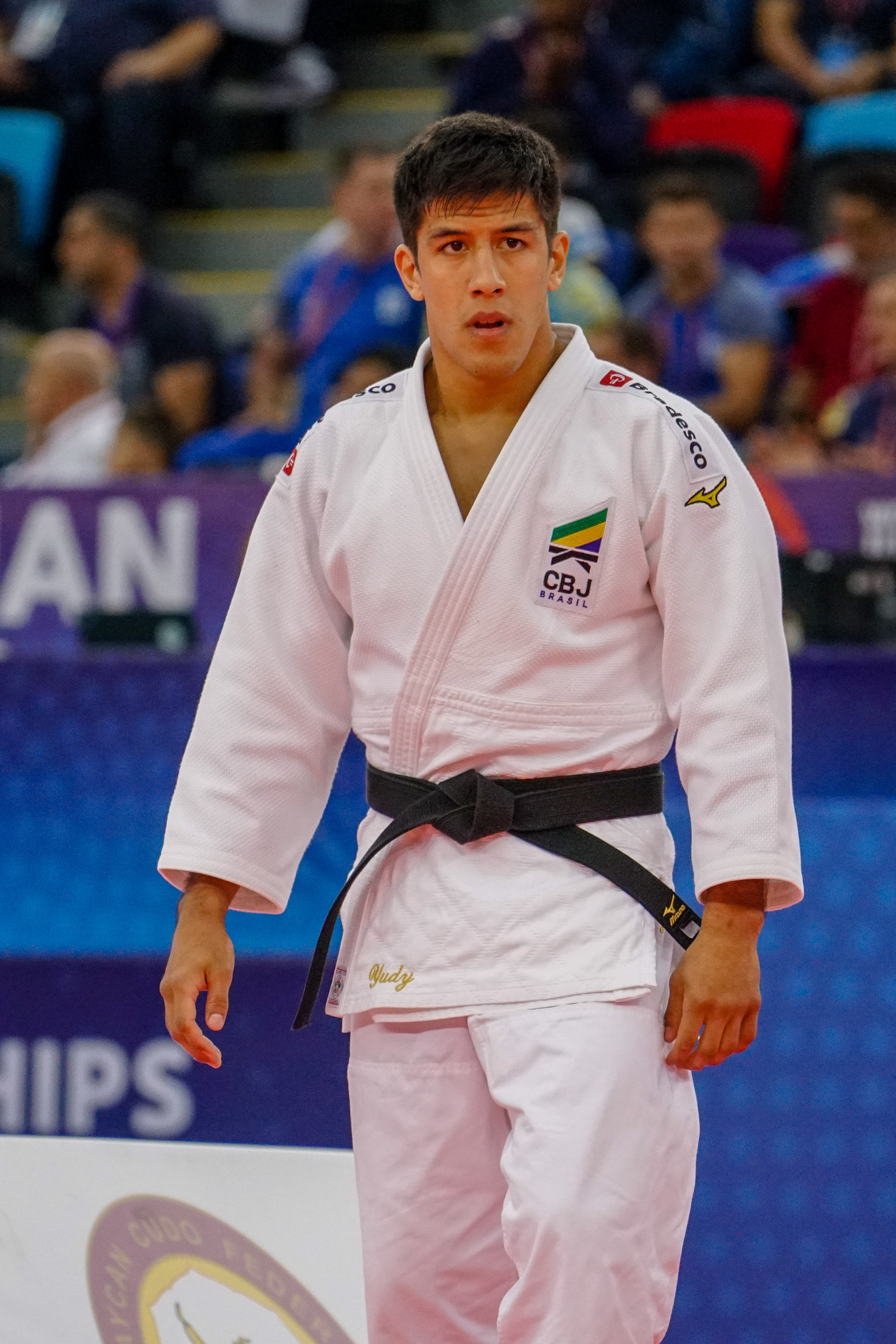

Personal information
- Born: 22 April 1983 (age 43) São Paulo, Brazil
- Occupation: Judoka
- Height: 1.82 m (6 ft 0 in)

Sport
- Country: Brazil
- Sport: Judo
- Weight class: ‍–‍90 kg

Achievements and titles
- Olympic Games: 7th (2008)
- World Champ.: R64 (2013)
- Pan American Champ.: (2008)
Medal record
Men's judo
Representing Brazil
Pan American Championships
Gold medal – first place	2008 Miami	‍–‍90 kg
Silver medal – second place	2009 Buenos Aires	‍–‍90 kg
South American Games
Bronze medal – third place	2010 Medellín	‍–‍90 kg
IJF Grand Slam
Bronze medal – third place	2009 Rio de Janeiro	‍–‍90 kg

Profile at external databases
- IJF: 2460
- JudoInside.com: 48735
- Updated on 28 November 2022

Eduardo Santos (born 22 April 1983 in São Paulo) is a Brazilian judoka, who played for the middleweight category. He won the bronze medal for his category at the 2010 South American Games in Medellín, Colombia.

Santos represented Brazil at the 2008 Summer Olympics in Beijing, where he competed for the men's middleweight class (90 kg). He reached only into the quarterfinal round, where he lost to France's Yves-Matthieu Dafreville, who was able to score an ippon before the match stopped in the fifth minute. Santos offered another shot for the bronze medal through the repechage bout; however, he finished only in seventh place, losing to Switzerland's Sergei Aschwanden by a superiority decision from the judges.
