= David Alarza =

Spanish judoka

Personal information
- Born: 7 January 1977 (age 49)
- Occupation: Judoka

Sport
- Country: Spain
- Sport: Judo
- Weight class: –90 kg

Achievements and titles
- Olympic Games: 13th (2008)
- World Champ.: 5th (2009)
- European Champ.: (gold) (2005)
Medal record
Men's judo
Representing Spain
European Championships
| Gold medal – first place | 2005 Rotterdam | –90 kg |
| Silver medal – second place | 2006 Tampere | –90 kg |
| Bronze medal – third place | 2007 Belgrade | –90 kg |
IJF Grand Prix
| Silver medal – second place | 2009 Qingdao | –90 kg |
| Bronze medal – third place | 2011 Amsterdam | –90 kg |
World Juniors Championships
| Gold medal – first place | 1996 Porto | –86 kg |
European Junior Championships
| Gold medal – first place | 1996 Monte Carlo | –86 kg |

Profile at external databases
- IJF: 466
- JudoInside.com: 3436
- Updated on 16 November 2022

David Alarza Palacios (born 7 January 1977 in Madrid) is a Spanish judoka.

Alarza began competing in judo at a very young age, taking part in the Club of Judo Brunete in Brunete, Spain. Currently, Alarza coaches in the "Centro de Alto Rendimiento de Madrid".

Alarza is a fan of the mountains of Spain and enjoys mountain biking.

== Achievements ==
| Year | Tournament | Place | Weight class |
|---|---|---|---|
| 2009 | European Championships | 5th | Middleweight (90 kg) |
| 2008 | European Championships | 5th | Middleweight (90 kg) |
| 2007 | European Judo Championships | 3rd | Middleweight (90 kg) |
| 2006 | European Judo Championships | 2nd | Middleweight (90 kg) |
| 2005 | European Judo Championships | 1st | Middleweight (90 kg) |
| 2004 | European Judo Championships | 7th | Middleweight (90 kg) |
| 2001 | Mediterranean Games | 3rd | Half middleweight (81 kg) |
