= Brad Bolen =

American judoka (born 1989)

Personal information
- Born: Bradford Bolen; January 22, 1989 (age 37) River Forest, Illinois
- Occupation: Judoka
- Weight: 145 lb (66 kg; 10.4 st)

Sport
- Sport: Judo
- Rank: 3rd dan black belt
Medal record
Representing United States
Men's Judo
Pan American Judo Championships
Gold medal – first place	2010 San Salvador	66 kg

Profile at external databases
- IJF: 2224
- JudoInside.com: 51615

Bradford Bolen (born January 22, 1989) is a judoka from United States.

He was in group of 2012 Olympic hopefuls. His current biggest success is winning Pan American Judo Championships in 2010 where he stunned the international field of 66 kg players by winning automatically, only after his opponents were disqualified and not even allowed to compete.

Brad is currently the Head Junior Coach at the Jason Morris Judo Center in Glenville, New York.

== Achievements ==
Year	Tournament	Place	Weight class
2010	Pan American Judo Championships	1st	Half lightweight (66 kg)
