= Mamadou Samba Bah =

Guinean judoka

Personal information
- Nationality: Guinea
- Born: 13 May 1995 (age 30)

Sport
- Sport: Judoka
- Event: under 73kg

Mamadou Samba Bah (born 13 May 1995) is a Guinean judoka who competes in the under 73 kg category.

Selected to compete at the delayed 2020 Summer Olympics in Tokyo, he was drawn in his first match against Tsend-Ochiryn Tsogtbaatar who would go on and win the bronze medal for Mongolia. As a Guinean competitor he had to be granted special dispensation to compete because he missed the official weigh-in after the Guinean federation initially pulled their athletes from the Games over fears around the COVID-19 pandemic, before rescinding that decision after the games had started.
