= Irakli Tsirekidze =

Georgian judoka (born 1982)

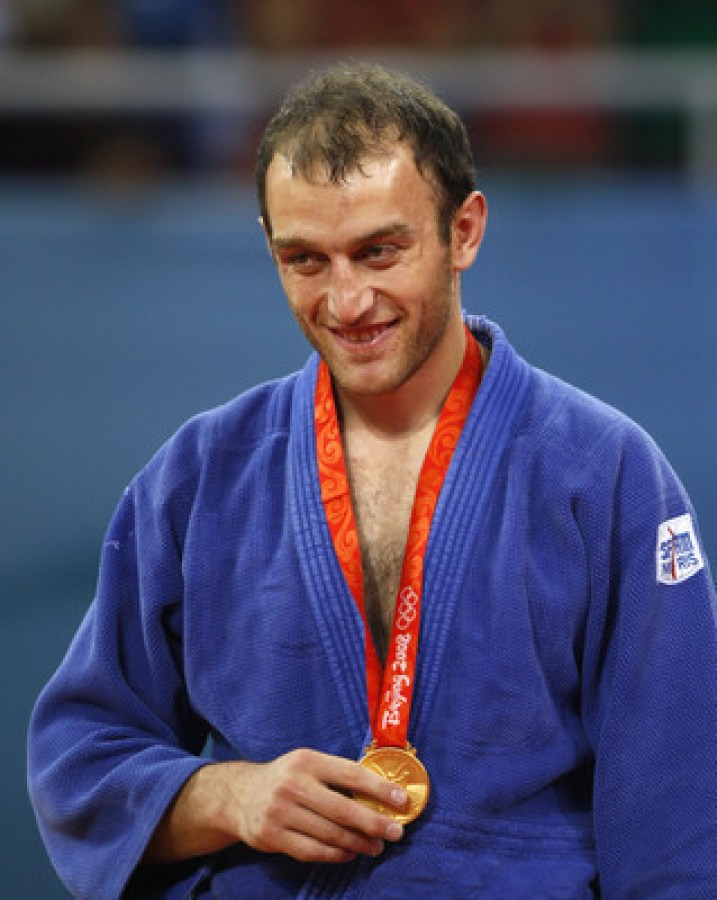

Personal information
- Born: 3 May 1982 (age 44)
- Occupation: Judoka

Sport
- Country: Georgia
- Sport: Judo
- Weight class: –90 kg, –100 kg

Achievements and titles
- Olympic Games: (gold) (2008)
- World Champ.: (2007)
- European Champ.: (silver) (2007)
Medal record
Men's judo
Representing Georgia
Olympic Games
Gold medal – first place	2008 Beijing	‍–‍90 kg
World Championships
Gold medal – first place	2006 Paris	Men's team
Gold medal – first place	2007 Rio de Janeiro	‍–‍90 kg
Gold medal – first place	2008 Tokyo	Men's team
Bronze medal – third place	2011 Paris	‍–‍100 kg
European Championships
Gold medal – first place	2007 Minsk	Men's team
Silver medal – second place	2007 Belgrade	‍–‍90 kg
Bronze medal – third place	2008 Lisbon	‍–‍90 kg
Bronze medal – third place	2011 Istanbul	‍–‍100 kg
IJF Grand Slam
Gold medal – first place	2012 Rio de Janeiro	‍–‍100 kg
Bronze medal – third place	2010 Paris	‍–‍100 kg
Bronze medal – third place	2011 Tokyo	‍–‍100 kg
IJF Grand Prix
Bronze medal – third place	2009 Hamburg	‍–‍100 kg

Profile at external databases
- IJF: 770
- JudoInside.com: 20836
- Updated on 30 May 2023

Irakli Tsirekidze (Georgian: ირაკლი ცირეკიძე) (born 3 May 1982) is a Georgian judoka.

On 15 September 2007, he won a gold medal at the world judo championships beating Greek Ilias Iliadis by yuko.

At the 2008 Summer Olympics, he won a gold medal with beating Algerian Amar Benikhlef in the final.

He became head coach of the Georgian National Judo Team after the Rio 2016 Summer Olympics.

== Achievements ==
Year	Tournament	Place	Weight class
2011	World Judo Championships	3rd	Heavyweight (–100 kg)
2011	European Championships	3rd	Heavyweight (–100 kg)
2008	Summer Olympics	1st	Middleweight (–90 kg)
2008	European Championships	3rd	Middleweight (–90 kg)
2007	World Judo Championships	1st	Middleweight (–90 kg)
2007	European Judo Championships	2nd	Middleweight (–90 kg)
2005	European Judo Championships	5th	Middleweight (–90 kg)
