= Khurshid Nabiev =

Uzbekistani judoka (born 1985)

Personal information
- Born: 11 August 1985 (age 40)
- Occupation: Judoka
- Height: 1.80 m (5 ft 11 in)

Sport
- Country: Uzbekistan
- Sport: Judo
- Weight class: ‍–‍90 kg

Achievements and titles
- Olympic Games: R16 (2008)
- World Champ.: R32 (2005, 2010)
- Asian Champ.: (silver) (2008)
Medal record
Men's judo
Representing Uzbekistan
Asian Championships
Silver medal – second place	2008 Jeju	‍–‍90 kg
Bronze medal – third place	2013 Bangkok	‍–‍90 kg
IJF Grand Slam
Bronze medal – third place	2010 Tokyo	‍–‍90 kg
Bronze medal – third place	2011 Paris	‍–‍90 kg
IJF Grand Prix
Gold medal – first place	2010 Abu Dhabi	‍–‍90 kg
Silver medal – second place	2010 Düsseldorf	‍–‍90 kg
Silver medal – second place	2013 Almaty	‍–‍90 kg
Asian Junior Championships
Bronze medal – third place	2004 Doha	‍–‍81 kg
Summer Universiade
Gold medal – first place	2007 Bangkok	‍–‍90 kg

Profile at external databases
- IJF: 2434
- JudoInside.com: 27283
- Updated on 28 November 2022

Khurshid Nabiev (Uzbek: Хуршид Набиев; born 11 August 1985) is an Uzbekistani judoka, who played for the middleweight category. He won a gold medal for his division at the 2007 Summer Universiade in Bangkok, Thailand, and silver at the 2008 Asian Judo Championships in Jeju City, South Korea.

Nabiev represented Uzbekistan at the 2008 Summer Olympics in Beijing, where he competed for the men's middleweight class (90 kg). He defeated Great Britain's Winston Gordon in the first preliminary round, before losing out his next match, with a waza-ari and a sumi gaeshi (corner throw), to Azerbaijan's Elkhan Mammadov.
