= Sergei Aschwanden =

Swiss judoka (born 1975)

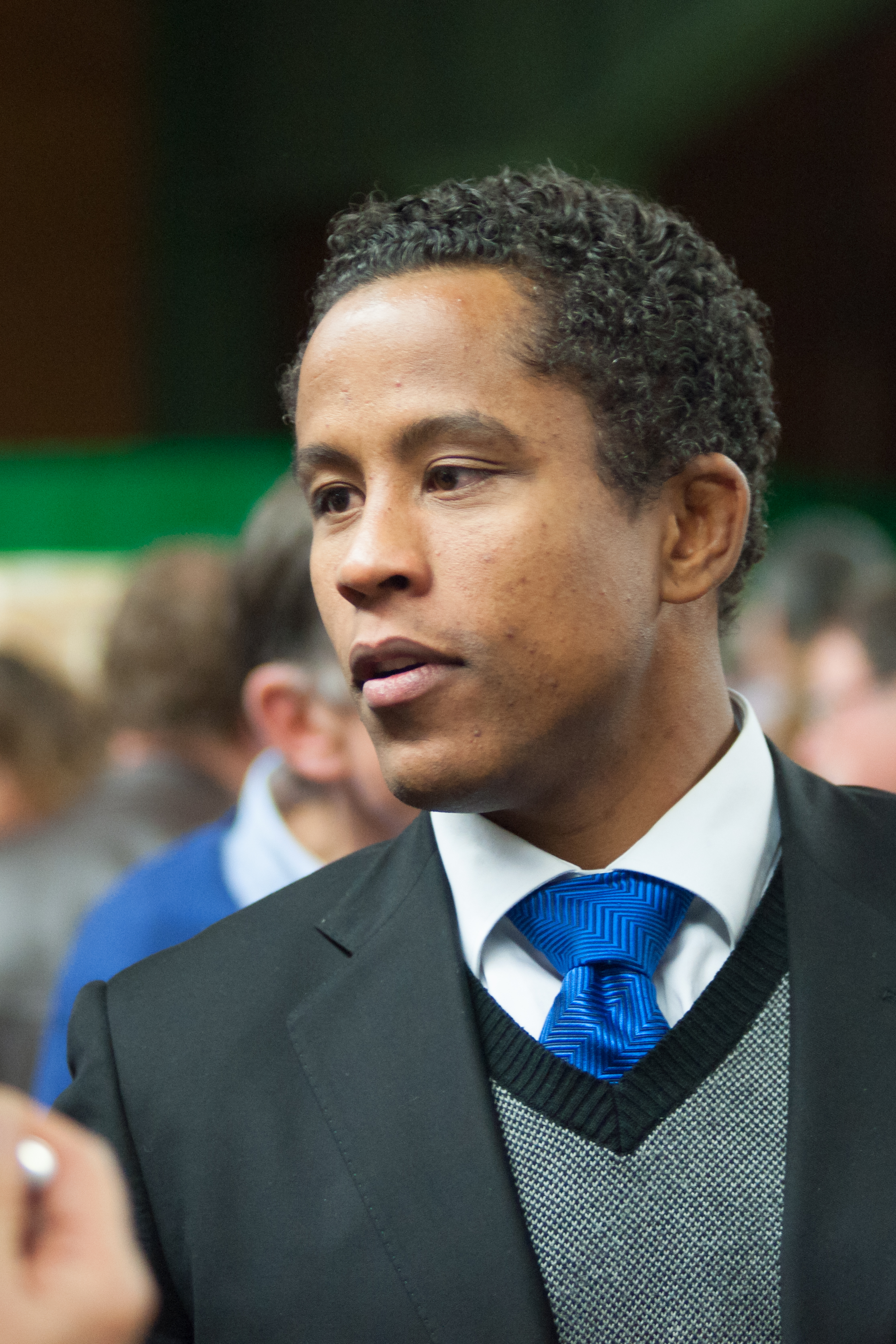
- Sergei Aschwanden at Mérite sportif vaudois, 2014.

Personal information
- Born: 22 December 1975 (age 50)
- Occupation: Judoka
- Website: sergei.ch

Sport
- Country: Switzerland
- Sport: Judo
- Weight class: –81 kg, –90 kg

Achievements and titles
- Olympic Games: (bronze) (2008)
- World Champ.: (silver) (2003)
- European Champ.: (gold) (2000, 2003)
Medal record
Men's judo
Representing Switzerland
Olympic Games
Bronze medal – third place	2008 Beijing	‍–‍90 kg
World Championships
Silver medal – second place	2003 Osaka	‍–‍81 kg
Bronze medal – third place	2001 Munich	‍–‍81 kg
European Championships
Gold medal – first place	2000 Wrocław	‍–‍81 kg
Gold medal – first place	2003 Düsseldorf	‍–‍81 kg
Bronze medal – third place	2005 Rotterdam	‍–‍90 kg
Bronze medal – third place	2006 Tampere	‍–‍81 kg

Profile at external databases
- IJF: 10184
- JudoInside.com: 662
- Updated on 30 May 2023

Sergei Aschwanden (born 22 December 1975, Bern, Switzerland) is a Swiss judoka and politician.

== Achievements ==
Year	Tournament	Place	Weight class
2008	Summer Olympics	3rd	Middleweight (90 kg)
2006	European Judo Championships	3rd	Half middleweight (81 kg)
2005	European Judo Championships	3rd	Middleweight (90 kg)
2003	World Judo Championships	2nd	Half middleweight (81 kg)
2003	European Judo Championships	1st	Half middleweight (81 kg)
2001	World Judo Championships	3rd	Half middleweight (81 kg)
2000	European Judo Championships	1st	Half middleweight (81 kg)
