= Diego Rosati =

Argentinian Olympic judoka

Personal information
- Born: 22 November 1978 (age 47)
- Occupation: Judoka

Sport
- Sport: Judo
Medal record
Representing Argentina
Men's judo
Pan American Judo Championships
Silver medal – second place	2010 San Salvador	90 kg

Profile at external databases
- JudoInside.com: 9989

Diego Rosati (born November 22, 1978) is a judoka from Argentina who competed in 2008 Summer Olympics.
